= List of people from Monterrey =

This is a list of notable people from Monterrey, Mexico.

== Notable people ==
- Jesus Arellano, footballer for local squad Rayados de Monterrey and formerly of the Mexican national side
- Bárbara López, Mexican actress
- Eva Gonda de Rivera, Mexican billionaire heiress and businesswoman
- David Martínez, Mexican investor, businessman, the founder and managing partner of Fintech Advisory
- Marcela Bovio, lead singer of Stream of Passion
- Erika Buenfil, actress
- Fernando Canales, businessman, and Mexican politician
- Federico Cantú, painter, engraver and sculptor, also known as El Ulises de Cadereyta
- Eloy Cavazos, bullfighter
- Jorge de la Rosa, MLB player for the Milwaukee Brewers, Kansas City Royals, and the Colorado Rockies
- Aldo de Nigris, association footballer
- Antonio de Nigris, association footballer
- Giovani dos Santos, association footballer
- Mario Vanzzini, Tv host and Showrunner
- Jonathan dos Santos, association footballer
- Cynthia Duque, Miss Mexico Universe 2013
- Fernando Elizondo, politician
- Ernesto Enkerlin Hoeflich, conservationist
- Anagabriela Espinoza, TV hostess, model and Miss International 2009
- Mauricio Fernandez Garza, businessman, politician and millionaire
- Katty Fuentes, Miss Mexico Universe 1998
- Elsa García, artistic gymnast
- Eugenio Garza Lagüera, businessman
- Eugenio Garza Sada, businessman and philanthropist
- María Luisa "Loreley" Garza, writer, intellectual, poet and essayist, also known as La novia de Nervo
- José Eleuterio González, medical doctor and professor
- Fabiola Guajardo, actress, model, author and musician
- Ely Guerra, singer-songwriter
- Esteban Gutiérrez, Formula 1 driver for Sauber
- Malukah, singer-songwriter
- Melissa Barrera, Actress
- Lucero Montemayor, Miss Mexico International 2013
- Bianca Marroquin, musical theatre actress known as the first Latina to play in a starring role on Broadway
- José Marroquín Leal, clown and children's TV show host
- Eduardo Martínez Celis, journalist, author and politician, also known as El Abate Sieyés
- Servando Teresa de Mier, Roman Catholic priest
- Consuelo Morales Elizondo, human rights activist
- José A. Muguerza, businessman and philanthropist
- Pato O'Ward, racing driver competing for Arrow McLaren SP in the IndyCar Series
- Ramiro Peña, Major League Baseball player
- Priscila Perales, actress, model and Miss International 2007
- Celso Piña, singer-songwriter
- Alejandra Quintero, Model and Miss Mexico World 1995
- Adal Ramones, comedian, television host
- Nayeli Rangel, captain of the Mexico women's national football team
- Alfonso Reyes, writer, intellectual, poet and essayist, also known as El Regiomontano Universal
- Sofía Reyes, actress and singer-songwriter
- Silvia Salgado, Miss Mexico Universe 1999
- Nora Salinas, actress and model
- Blanca Soto, actress, model and Miss Mexico World 1997
- Daniel Suárez, NASCAR driver
- Gloria Trevi, singer
- Javier Treviño, former Deputy Foreign Minister of Mexico
- Mariana Treviño, actress
- Manuel Uribe, world's fattest man
- Alicia Villarreal, singer
- The Warning (Mexican band), consisting of sisters Daniela, Paulina, and Alejandra Villarreal
- Kat Von D, tattoo artist
- José Woldenberg, first President of the Federal Electoral Institute
- Gabriel Zaid, writer, poet and intellectual
- Lorenzo Zambrano, businessman and billionaire
- Paulina Goto, actress and singer
- Fabiola Guajardo, actress
- Judith de los Santos (Malukah), singer, songwriter, composer
