= Nuestra Belleza México 2012 =

19th edition of Nuestra Belleza México beauty pageant

- Date: September 1, 2012
- Presenters: Ximena Navarrete, Alan Tacher
- Entertainment: Reik, Río Roma, Ricardo Montaner
- Venue: Poliforum del Centro de Convenciones, Tuxtla Gutiérrez, Chiapas, Mexico
- Broadcaster: Televisa
- Entrants: 35
- Placements: 15
- Withdrawals: Campeche, Quintana Roo
- Returns: Guerrero, Tlaxcala
- Winner: Cynthia Duque; Nuevo León

Nuestra Belleza México 2012, the 19th annual Nuestra Belleza México beauty pageant, was held at the Poliforum del Centro de Convenciones in Tuxtla Gutiérrez, Chiapas, Mexico on September 1, 2012. Thirty-five contestants from Mexico competed for the national title, which was won by Cynthia Duque from Nuevo León, who later competed in Miss Universe 2013 in Russia. Duque was crowned by outgoing Nuestra Belleza México titleholder Karina González. She is the fourth Neoleonesa to win this title.

The Nuestra Belleza Mundo México title was won by Marilyn Chagoya from Veracruz who later competed in Miss World 2013 in Indonesia. Chagoya was crowned by outgoing Nuestra Belleza Mundo México titleholder Mariana Berumen. She is the first and only Veracruzana to win this title.

Lucero Montemayor from Nuevo León was designated by the Nuestra Belleza México Organization as Nuestra Belleza Internacional México 2013. She later competed in Miss International 2013 in Japan. She is the third Neoleonesa to win this title.

This year for the first time a contestant was elected by a virtual casting and after eleven years, two events were held separately to select the two winners for the titles Nuestra Belleza México and Nuestra Belleza Mundo México, for the fifth time in the history of the pageant.

The recognition "Corona al Mérito 2012" was for Ximena Navarrete, Miss Universe 2010.

== Results ==
=== Placements ===
Placement	Contestant
Nuestra Belleza México 2012	Nuevo León – Cynthia Duque
Suplente/1st Runner-Up	Nuevo León – Lucero Montemayor
2nd Runner-Up	Distrito Federal – Karen Padilla
3rd Runner-Up	Jalisco – Jacqueline Sauza
4th Runner-Up	Aguascalientes – Jessica Amor
Top 10	Chihuahua – Gabriela Prieto; Distrito Federal – Natalia Serrano; Jalisco – Ana Karen Siorda; Morelos – Chiara Leuzinger; San Luis Potosí – Verónica Sánchez
Top 15	Baja California – Jeraldine González; Chiapas – Valeria Ruíz; Guanajuato – Elisa Espinosa; Nayarit – Jasibi Suma; Sinaloa – Karime Macías

=== Order of announcements ===
==== Top 15 ====
1. Nuevo León
2. Chihuahua
3. Nuevo León
4. San Luis Potosí
5. Guanajuato
6. Jalisco
7. Jalisco
8. Nayarit
9. Distrito Federal
10. Sinaloa
11. Baja California
12. Aguascalientes
13. Distrito Federal
14. Morelos
15. Chiapas

==== Top 10 ====
1. Distrito Federal
2. Jalisco
3. Nuevo León
4. Nuevo León
5. Aguascalientes
6. San Luis Potosí
7. Jalisco
8. Morelos
9. Chihuahua
10. Distrito Federal

==== Top 5 ====
1. Jalisco
2. Distrito Federal
3. Aguascalientes
4. Nuevo León
5. Nuevo León

=== Nuestra Belleza Mundo México ===
Two days before to the final competition was held, the semifinal competition featured a live show entitled "Nuestra Belleza Mundo Mexico" in which it was announced the winner of the Nuestra Belleza Mundo México title was Marilyn Chagoya from Veracruz, who would represent Mexico at Miss World 2013. All contestants competed in swimsuit and evening gown categories during the contest.

The Nuestra Belleza Mundo México pageant was held at the Poliforum del Centro de Convenciones of Tuxtla Gutiérrez, Chiapas, Mexico, on August 30, 2012 and was hosted by Mariana Berumen, Karina González and Jan. It was the 5th edition of the Nuestra Belleza Mundo Méxicmcontest and as an official separate pageant to choose Mexico's representative to Miss World. The winner of this event did not compete in the final night competition.

Final results	Contestant
Nuestra Belleza Mundo México 2012	Veracruz - Marilyn Chagoya
Suplente/1st Runner-up	Nuevo León – Lucero Montemayor
Top 5	Jalisco – Jacqueline Sauza; Nuevo León - Cynthia Duque; San Luis Potosí – Verónica Sánchez

=== Order of announcements ===
==== Top 5 ====
1. Jalisco
2. Veracruz
3. Nuevo León
4. San Luis Potosí
5. Nuevo León

=== National costume competition ===
In this competition, the costumes are evaluated instead of the contestants. It is a competition showing the country's wealth embodied in the colorful and fascinating costumes made by Mexican designers combining the past and present of Mexico.

The event is important because it discloses the creative work of Mexican designers and also selects the costume to represent Mexico in Miss Universe the next year. Also, some costumes are selected to represent Mexico in other beauty contests.

The winning costume designer received the "Aguja Diamante Award".

Final results	Contestant
Winner	Veracruz – "Amazona del Totonacapan"
Top 5	Baja California Sur – "Cielito Lindo"; Jalisco – "Jalisco en la Piel"; Veracruz – "Artesanías Mexicana"; Yucatán – "Yaxché, Ceiba Sagrada"

- Aguascalientes – "Guerrera Azteca"
- Baja California – "Águila Azteca" (Competed in Reina Hispanoamericana 2012)
- Baja California Sur – "Cielito Lindo" (Competed in Miss Continente Americano 2012)
- Chiapas – "Reina Roja: Herencia Maya de Palenque"
- Chiapas – "Coyochauxtli"
- Colima – "Orgullo Mexicano: El Rebozo"
- Colima – "Friso Maya"
- Colima – "Tesoros Mayas: Tumba de Pakal"
- Durango – "Folklore Mexicano"
- Durango – "Mesticismo Huichol"
- State of Mexico – "Diosa Azteca"
- Jalisco – "Jalisco en la Piel"
- Oaxaca – "Malacatera: Inigualable Tejedora de Algodón"
- Sinaloa – "Pasión Mexicana"
- Sinaloa – "Mujer Bravía" (Competed in Miss International 2012)
- Tabasco – "Maravillosamente Mexicano" (Will compete in Reina Hispanoamericana 2015)
- Veracruz – "Amazona del Totonacapan" (Competed in Miss Universe 2013)
- Veracruz – "Artesanías Mexicanas"
- Yucatán – "Yaxché, Ceiba Sagrada"

=== Special awards ===
Award	Contestant
Miss Top Model	San Luis Potosí – Verónica Sánchez
Contestants' Choice	Nuevo León - Cynthia Duque
Miss Talent	Chihuahua – Gabriela Prieto
Miss Sports	Nuevo León – Lucero Montemayor
Academic Award	Veracruz - Marilyn Chagoya
Personality Fraiche	Nuevo León – Cynthia Duque
Steps to Fame	San Luis Potosí – Verónica Sánchez

== Judges ==
They were the same judges at the Preliminary and Final Competition.

- Karin Ontiveros – Nuestra Belleza México 2010
- Alejandra Espinoza – Nuestra Belleza Baja California 2006, Nuestra Belleza Latina 2007 and TV Hostess
- Macario Jiménez – Fashion Designer
- Rubén Galindo – Television Producer
- Daniel Arenas- Actor
- Jordi Avendaño – Photographer
- Agustín Arana – Singer
- Lisardo – Actor

== Background music ==
- Opening Number: "Sexy and I Know It" by LMFAO
- Intermediate: "Peligro" & "Te Fuiste de Aquí" by Reik
- Intermediate: "Convénceme" & "La Cima del Cielo" by Ricardo Montaner
- Evening Gown Competition: "Tan Sólo un Minuto" & "Tu me Cambiaste la Vida" by Río Roma
- Crowning Moment: "Nuestra Belleza" (Official Theme)

== Expected contestants ==
State	Contestant	Age	Height (m)	Hometown
Aguascalientes	Jéssica Amor Mendoza	22	1.77	Aguascalientes
Baja California	Jeraldine González Meza	23	1.74	Tijuana
Baja California Sur	Diana Kristal Castro Castro †	21	1.82	La Paz
Chiapas	Valeria Ruíz López	21	1.76	Arriaga
(Chihuahua (state)) Chihuahua	Gabriela Prieto Díaz Infante	19	1.72	Chihuahua
Coahuila	Cecilia Nallely Vázquez Aguirre	21	1.77	Saltillo
Colima	Mirna Guadalupe Parra Orozco	20	1.82	Armería
(Mexico City) Distrito Federal	Karen Joselin Padilla Brizuela	21	1.73	Mexico City
(Mexico City) Distrito Federal	Natalia Serrano Lecuona	21	1.68	Mexico City
Durango	Ana Victoria Alexandra Sánchez Soto	22	1.70	Durango
(State of Mexico) Estado de México	Laura Villalobos Cano	18	1.80	Metepec
Guanajuato	Elisa Espinosa Gómez	22	1.73	Celaya
Guerrero	Fátima Paloma Hernández Carpio	18	1.80	Acapulco
(Hidalgo (state)) Hidalgo	María de los Ángeles Cuevas De Anda	21	1.70	Tulancingo
Jalisco	Ana Karen Siordia Velasco	22	1.74	Guadalajara
Jalisco	Jacqueline Ivonne Sauza Ávila	22	1.75	Guadalajara
Michoacán	Sofía Chávez Castillo	23	1.74	Jacona
Morelos	Chiara Leuzinger Zuccolotto	18	1.71	Cuernavaca
Nayarit	Lilia Jasibi Suma Cueva	22	1.74	Bahía de Banderas
Nuevo León	Cynthia Lizetthe Duque Garza	19	1.76	Monterrey
Nuevo León	Lucero Miroslava Montemayor Gracia	22	1.75	Monterrey
Oaxaca	Almudena Villasante Palau	19	1.74	Oaxaca
Oaxaca	Michelle Amayrani Mendoza García	21	1.73	Oaxaca
Puebla	Paola Dartigues Rodríguez	19	1.75	Puebla
Querétaro	Ana Elisa García Hugues	20	1.68	Querétaro
San Luis Potosí	Verónica Sánchez Alonso	21	1.79	San Luis Potosí
Sinaloa	Ana Karime Macías Olson	23	1.71	Mazatlán
Sinaloa	Briseyda Zazueta López	21	1.72	Culiacán
Sonora	Gabriela Saldívar Preciado	19	1.71	Cd. Obregón
Tabasco	María Alejandra García Izquierdo	20	1.75	Villahermosa
Tamaulipas	Lluvia Andrea Andrade Vargas	20	1.73	Reynosa
Tlaxcala	Carla Angelli Tapia Rosas	20	1.80	Tlaxcala
Veracruz	María Elena "Marilyn" Chagoya Triana	18	1.80	Poza Rica
Yucatán	Marsha Mariana Ramírez Martínez	21	1.71	Mérida
Zacatecas	Thalía Artemisa Rivera Montáñez	22	1.75	Zacatecas

== Virtual casting ==
For the only time in the history of the competition, a virtual casting was held for the girls who failed to become finalists in their respective states. Three finalists were chosen, with the winner being elected by the fan votes and announced on July 20, 2012.

Final results	Contestant
Winner	Oaxaca – Michelle Mendoza
Finalists	Chihuahua – Brenda Bejarano; Jalisco Jacqueline Sauza

== Replacements ==
- Chiapas – Karla Ruíz was the winner of Nuestra Belleza Chiapas 2012. The Nuestra Belleza Turismo Chiapas 2012, Valeria Ruíz was who represented Chiapas in Nuestra Belleza México 2012. Karla Ruíz left the competition after developing symptoms of chickenpox that precluded her participation in the contest. Instead Valeria Ruíz took her deputy who joined activities with other state representatives days later.

== Designates ==
- Jalisco – Jaqueline Sauza
- Nuevo León – Lucero Montemayor
- Sinaloa – Briseyda Zazueta

== Returning states ==
- Last competed in 2009:
  - Tlaxcala
- Last competed in 2010:
  - Guerrero

== Withdrawals ==
- Chiapas – Karla Ruíz
- Campeche
- 'Quintana Roo, '

== Significance ==
- Nuevo León won the Nuestra Belleza México title for the fourth time (before 1997, 1998 and 2005)
- Veracruz won the Nuestra Belleza Mundo México title for the first time ever.
- Nuevo León won the Nuestra Belleza Internacional México title for the third time (before 2007 and 2009) and was the Suplente/1st Runner-up for the third time (before 2003 and 2004).
- This year there was a new change, for the first time a contestant was elected by a virtual casting.
- Cynthia Duque's crown fell to the ground after she was crowned, suffering major damage.
- After eleven years, the Final Competition to select to "Nuestra Belleza Mundo México" returned to the program.
- For the first time, Oaxaca had two representatives in the competition.
- For the first time, a State (Distrito Federal) had two Beauty Queens.
- Tlaxcala returns to competition after three years (2009).
- Guerrero returns to competition after two years (2010).
- Jalisco was placed for the ninth consecutive year in the Top 5.
- Aguascalientes was placed for the third consecutive year in the Top 5.
- Jalisco and Nuevo León were placed for the tenth consecutive year.
- Aguascalientes and Sinaloa were placed for the fifth consecutive year.
- Distrito Federal was placed for the fourth consecutive year.
- Morelos was placed for the third consecutive year.
- Chiapas and Guanajuato were placed for the second consecutive year.
- Veracruz returned to making calls to the semi-finals after two years (2010), Baja California and Chihuahua after three years (2009), San Luis Potosí after four years (2008), Nayarit after six years (2006)
- States that were called to the semi-finals last year and this year failed to qualify were Baja California Sur, Durango, Estado de México and Sonora.
- Chihuahua won Miss Talent for the second time (before 2009).
- Nuevo León won Contestants' Choice and Miss Sports for the first time.
- San Luis Potosí won for the first time a Fast-track, Miss Top Model.
- Veracruz won for the first time a Fast-track, the Academic Award and Best National Costume.
- The host delegate, Valeria Ruíz from Chiapas placed to semi-finals.
- For the first time Ximena Navarrete and Alan Tacher hosted the pageant.
- Baja California Sur (Diana Castro) and Colima (Mirna Parra) are the tallest delegates in this edition (1.82 m).
- Distrito Federal (Natalia Serrano), Hidalgo (Ángeles Cuevas) and Querétaro (Ana Elisa García) are the shortest delegate in this edition (1.68 m).
- Delegates from Colima, Chihuahua, Distrito Federal, Hidalgo, Guerrero, Morelos, Tabasco and Tlaxcala were elected by designation.

== Contestants notes ==
- Aguascalientes – Jessica Amor is the Reina de la Feria Nacional de San Marcos 2014.
- Baja California – Jeraldine González was selected to represent Mexico in Reina Hispanoamericana 2012 in Santa Cruz, Bolivia on October 25, 2012 where she won Miss Elegance.
- Baja California Sur – Diana Castro was elected Reina Del Carnaval La Paz 2012 and Nuestra Belleza La Paz 2012, competition prior to the final state.
- Coahuila – Cecilia Vázquez was Reina de Turismo Coahuila 2010 and today she is a Professional Model.
- Colima – Mirna Parra was elected Reina Armería 2010 in Ciudad de Armería, Colima. In 2011 she competed in Reina de la Feria de todos los Santos Colima 2011. In 2013 she married her boyfriend of several years.
- Chiapas – Karla Ruíz left the competition for health reasons, and who had symptoms of chickenpox that precludes their participation in the contest. Instead Valeria Ruíz took his deputy who joined activities with other state representatives days later.
- Chiapas – Valeria Ruíz was the Suplente/1st Runner-up in Nuestra Belleza Chiapas 2010 and Nuestra Belleza Turismo Chiapas 2012 in Nuestra Belleza Chiapas 2012.
- Chihuahua – Gabriela Prieto was part of Mexico's Next Top Model 2011, but she resigned from the competition because she missed her family. In 2012 she was elected Señorita Ciencias Políticas, UACH in her University. Competed in Reina Hispanoamericana 2013 where she was 3rd Runner-up and obtained the Miss Photogenic and Look Oster awards. Actually she is the new State Coordinator of Nuestra Belleza Chihuahua.
- (Mexico City) Distrito Federal – Karen Padilla was born in San Juan de los Lagos, Jalisco but she has been living in Mexico City for several years. She is a Professional Model. She competed in Miss Continente Americano 2012 where she was a finalist in the Top 6 and won Miss Photogenic award.
- Durango – Ana Victoria Sánchez was elected Reina del Club Campestre de Durango 2008.
- State of Mexico – Laura Villalobos is a Professional Model, she works with Contempo Models in Mexico City.
- Guanajuato – Elisa Espinoza was elected Señorita Universidad de Guanajuato 2011. Competed in Miss Costa Maya International 2014, held in Belize on August 9, 2014 obtained the crown.
- Guerrero – Fátima Hernández was Reina de la Expo-Feria de la Palmera 2010 in Zihuatanejo.
- Jalisco – Ana Karen Siordia is a Professional Model, she works at Look Models Management in Mexico City.
- Jalisco – Jacqueline Sauza studied at CEA. She received an award at the 2011 TVyNovelas Award as New Release. Also she is a Professional Model.
- Morelos – Chiara Leuzinger is of Swiss father and Italian mother.
- Nayarit – Jasibi Suma was born in Guadalajara, Jalisco, but she has been living in Nayarit for several years.
- Nuevo León – Cynthia Duque competed in Miss Universe 2013, but she didn't place.
- Nuevo León – Lucero Montemayor was the Suplente/1st Runner-up in Nuestra Belleza Nuevo León 2012. Also she was Señorita UANL 2011. She competed in Miss International 2013, and failed place to semi-finalists. She currently works as a television presenter for ESPN Mexico.
- Oaxaca – Michelle Mendoza was the Suplente/1st Runner-up in Nuestra Belleza Oaxaca 2012. She was elected by Virtual Casting. Currently she lives in Monterrey where she is part of Las Noticias in Televisa Monterrey.
- San Luis Potosí – Veronica Sánchez was part of the contestants of Mexico's Next Top Model 2009 finished as 5th Runner-up. She is a Professional Model.
- Sinaloa – Briseyda Zazueta was the Suplente/1st Runner-up in Nuestra Belleza Sinaloa 2012.
- Sonora – Gabriela Saldívar was crowned Nuestra Belleza Cajeme 2012 title she gave the right to participate in the final state of Nuestra Belleza Sonora 2012 which was the winner.
- Tabasco – Alejandra García was a contestant in Nuestra Belleza Tabasco 2010.
- Tlaxcala – Carla Tapia was born in Tepatitlan, Jalisco and competed in Nuestra Belleza Jalisco 2010. The same year, she was elected Miss Earth Jalisco 2010 and competed in Miss Earth México 2010 where she was a finalist in the Top 8. After time she moved to live in Tlaxcala where she was designated as Nuestra Belleza Tlaxcala 2012, marking the return of this State to the national competition after three years. Marilé del Rosario Señorita México 1989 the only Tlaxcalteca who participated in Miss Universe is supporting the state pageant. She represented Mexico at Miss Yacht Model International 2013 in Sanya, China where she was the 4th Runner-up.
- Veracruz – Marilyn Chagoya was elected Nuestra Belleza Poza Rica 2012, competition prior to the final state. She competed in Miss World 2013, but she didn't place.
- Yucatán – Marsha Ramírez was born in Guadalajara, Jalisco but she has lived for the last eight years in Yucatán. She is a local TV Hostess in Mérida.
- Zacatecas – Artemisa Rivera was born in Aguascalientes and she competed in Reina Nacional de la Feria de San Marcos 2012. Competed in Miss Costa Maya International 2013.

=== Crossovers ===
Contestants who had competed or will compete at other beauty pageants:

Miss Universe

- 2013: Nuevo León: Cynthia Duque

Miss World

- 2013: Veracruz: Marilyn Chagoya

Miss International

- 2013: Nuevo León: Lucero Montemayor

Miss United Continents

- 2016: Nuevo León: Cynthia Duque (4th Runner-up)

Miss Continente Americano

- 2012: (Mexico City) Distrito Federal: Karen Padilla (Top 6)

Reina Hispanoamericana

- 2012: Baja California: Jeraldine González
- 2013: Chihuahua: Gabriela Prieto (3rd Runner-up)

Miss Costa Maya International

- 2013: Zacatecas: Artemisa Rivera
- 2014: Guanajuato: Elisa Espinoza (Winner)

Miss Yacht Model International

- 2013: Tlaxcala: Carla Tapia (4th Runner-up)

Miss Earth México

- 2010: Tlaxcala: Carla Tapia (Top 8)
  - Jalisco's representative

Mexico's Next Top Model

- 2009: San Luis Potosí: Verónica Sánchez (5th Runner-up)
- 2011: Chihuahua: Gabriela Prieto

Reina de la Feria de San Marcos

- 2012: Zacatecas: Artemisa Rivera
- 2014: Aguascalientes: Jessica Amor (Winner)

Nuestra Belleza Chiapas

- 2010: Chiapas: Valeria Ruíz (Suplente/1st Runner-up)
- 2012: Chiapas: Valeria Ruíz (Nuestra Belleza Turismo Chiapas)

Nuestra Belleza Jalisco

- 2010: Tlaxcala: Carla Tapia

Nuestra Belleza Nuevo León

- 2012: Nuevo León: Lucero Montemayor (Suplente/1st Runner-up)

Nuestra Belleza Oaxaca

- 2012: Oaxaca: Michelle Mendoza (Suplente/1st Runner-up)

Nuestra Belleza Sinaloa

- 2012: Sinaloa: Briseyda Zazueta (Suplente/1st Runner-up)

Nuestra Belleza Tabasco

- 2010: Tabasco: Alejandra García

Reina del Carnaval La Paz

- 2012: Baja California Sur: Diana Castro (Winner)

Reina Armería

- 2010: Colima: Mirna Parra (Winner)

Señorita UANL

- 2011: Nuevo León: Lucero Montemayor (Winner)

Señorita Universidad de Guanajuato

- 2011: Guanajuato: Elisa Espinoza (Winner)

Reina Turismo Coahuila

- 2010: Coahuila: Cecilia Vázquez (Winner)
