= Mexicana Universal Tlaxcala =

Beauty contest in Mexico

- Formation: 1994 (as Nuestra Belleza Tlaxcala); 2017 (as Mexicana Universal Tlaxcala)
- Type: Beauty Pageant
- Headquarters: Puebla
- Location: Mexico
- Local Coordinator: Alejandro Zenil

Mexicana Universal Tlaxcala (until 2016 called Nuestra Belleza Tlaxcala) is a state-level contest in the state of Tlaxcala, Mexico, which selects the state representative for the national contest Mexicana Universal (formerly called Nuestra Belleza México), thus aspiring to represent the country internationally on one of the platforms offered.

The state organization has achieved the following results since 1994:

- 3rd Runner-up: 1 (1995)
- Top 10/11/12: 2 (2014, 2023)
- Top 15/16: 2 (1994, 2015)
- Unplaced: 15 (1996, 1997, 1998, 1999, 2000, 2001, 2002, 2003, 2009, 2012, 2013, 2016, 2017, 2019, 2021)
- Absences: 10 (2004, 2005, 2006, 2007, 2008, 2010, 2011, 2018, 2022, 2025)

== National Queens ==
- Verónica Jaspeado - Miss Verano México 1997

== Titleholders ==
The following are the names of the annual winners of Mexicana Universal Tlaxcala, listed in ascending order, as well as their results during the national Mexicana Universal pageant. State queens who represented the country in a current or past franchise of the national organization are also highlighted in a specific color.

Current Franchises:

- Competed at Miss Grand International.
- Competed at Miss International.
- Competed at Miss Charm.
- Competed at Reina Hispanoamericana.
- Competed at Miss Orb International.
- Competed at Nuestra Latinoamericana Universal.

Former Franchises:

- Competed at Miss Universe.
- Competed at Miss World.
- Competed at Miss Continente Americano.
- Competed at Miss Costa Maya International.
- Competed at Miss Atlántico Internacional.
- Competed at Miss Verano Viña del Mar.
- Competed at Reina Internacional del Café.
- Competed at Reina Internacional de las Flores.
- Competed at Señorita Continente Americano.
- Competed at Nuestra Belleza Internacional.

Year	Titleholder	Hometown	Placement	Special Award	Notes
2025	No candidate was sent				
2024	In 2024, due to changes in the dates of the national pageant, the election of the state queens was postponed for one year.				
2023	María Fernanda Sánchez Cervantes	Calpulalpan	Top 10	-	-
2022	No candidate was sent				
2021	Andrea Denisse Rosas Arcega	Chiautempan	-	-	-
2020	In 2020, due to the contingency of COVID-19 there was a lag in the year of the state contest				
2019	Yessica Lizeth Olvera Pérez	Tlaxcala	-	-	-
2018	No candidate was sent				
2017	Jessica Juárez Márquez	Tlaxco	-	-	2nd Runne-up at Nuestra Belleza Puebla 2014
Until 2016 the Title was Nuestra Belleza Tlaxcala
2016	Karla Hernández Rodríguez	Tetla de la Solidaridad	-	-	Competed at H2O Miss Teen Bikini International 2015; H2O Miss Teen Bikini México 2015; Reina de la Feria Tetla 2015; Belleza Universitaria UATX 2013
2015	Valeria Góngora Dorantes	Tlaxcala	Top 15	-	-
2014	Samantha Gutiérrez González-Rubio	Tlaxcala	Top 10	Academic Award; Miss Internet	Competed at Miss Costa Maya International 2015; 3rd Runner-up at Miss F1 México 2015; Miss Costa Maya México 2015; 1st Runner-up at Reina Mundial del Banano 2015; Reina del Banano México 2015
2013	Nydia Galindo Salas	Apizaco	-	-	12th Runner-up at Mexico's Next Top Model 2014; Top 8 at Miss Earth México 2012; Miss Earth Puebla 2012; Competed at Nuestra Belleza Puebla 2011
2012	Carla Angelli Tapia Rosas	Tlaxcala	-	-	4th Runner-up at Miss Yacht Model International 2013; Miss Yacht Model México 2013; Top 8 at Miss Earth México 2010; Miss Earth Jalisco 2010; Competed at Nuestra Belleza Jalisco 2010
2011	No candidate was sent				
2010	No candidate was sent				
2009	Stephanie López Rosas	Apizaco	-	-	-
2008	No candidate was sent				
2007	No candidate was sent				
2006	No candidate was sent				
2005	No candidate was sent				
2004	No candidate was sent				
2003	Renata Medina Soto	Tlaxcala	-	-	-
2002	Mariana Acevedo Lobato	Tlaxcala	-	-	-
2001	Aline Mónica Luna Ramírez	Apizaco	-	-	-
2000	María Guadalupe Lozada Díaz	Tlaxcala	-	-	-
1999	Ricarda Ramírez Mejía	Tlaxcala	-	-	-
1998	Fabiola Sánchez Wade	Tlaxcala	-	-	-
1997	Ivonne Corona Morales	Tlaxcala	-	-	-
1996	María Luisa Orozco Aréchiga	Tlaxcala	-	-	-
1995	María de Lourdes Sánchez Bretón	Tlaxcala	3rd Runner-up	-	-
1994	Verónica Alejandra Jaspeado Martínez	Tlaxcala	Top 16	Miss Diet Coke	Competed at Miss Verano Viña del Mar 1997; Miss Verano México 1997; Was born in Puebla

== See also ==
- Miss Tlaxcala
