= Mexicana Universal Nuevo León =

- Formation: 1994 (as Nuestra Belleza Nuevo León); 2017 (as Mexicana Universal Nuevo León)
- Type: Beauty pageant
- Headquarters: Monterrey
- Location: Mexico
- Local Coordinator: Oscar Pérez

Mexicana Universal Nuevo León (until 2016 called Nuestra Belleza Nuevo León) is a state-level contest in the state of Nuevo León, Mexico, which selects the state representative for the national contest Mexicana Universal (formerly called Nuestra Belleza México), thus aspiring to represent the country internationally on one of the platforms offered.

The state organization has achieved the following results since 1994:

- Winner: 8 (1995, 1997, 1998, 2005, 2007, 2010, 2012, 2019)
- 1st Runner-up: 5 (2003, 2004, 2012, 2018, 2021)
- 3rd Runner-up: 1 (2015)
- 4th Runner-up: 1 (2001)
- Top 10/11/12: 8 (1999, 2000, 2003, 2006, 2008, 2013, 2014, 2016)
- Top 15/16: 7 (1994, 1996, 2006, 2007, 2009, 2011, 2017)
- Top 20/21: 1 (2000, 2001, 2003)
- Unplaced: 4 (2002, 2011, 2022, 2025)
- Absences: 1 (2023)

== National Queens ==
- Andrea Bazarte - Mexicana Hispanoamericana 2021
- Lucero Montemayor - Nuestra Belleza Internacional México 2013 (Designated)
- Cynthia Duque - Nuestra Belleza México 2012
- Cynthia de la Vega - Nuestra Belleza Mundo México 2010 (Dethroned)
- Anagabriela Espinoza - Nuestra Belleza Internacional México 2009 (Designated)
- Anagabriela Espinoza - Nuestra Belleza Mundo México 2007
- Priscila Perales - Nuestra Belleza Internacional México 2007 (Designated)
- Priscila Perales - Nuestra Belleza México 2005
- Brisseida Moya - Reina del Café México 2004 (Designated)
- Carolina Salinas - Miss Expo World México 2002 (Designated)
- Elsa Burgos - Miss Costa Maya México 2002 (Designated)
- Silvia Salgado - Reina del Café México 1999 (Designated)
- Silvia Salgado - Nuestra Belleza México 1998
- Katty Fuentes - Miss Atlántico México 1998 (Designated)
- Katty Fuentes - Nuestra Belleza México 1997
- Yadira Elizondo - Top Model of the World México 1996 (Designated)
- Elena Martínez - Nuestra Belleza Internacional México 1996 (Designated)
- Alejandra Quintero - Nuestra Belleza Mundo México 1995

== Reinas Internacionales ==
- Andrea Bazarte - Reina Hispanoamericana 2021
- Anagabriela Espinoza - Miss International 2009
- Priscila Perales - Miss International 2007
- Carolina Salinas - Miss Expo World 2002
- Elsa Burgos - Miss Costa Maya International 002

== Titleholders ==
The following are the names of the annual winners of Mexicana Universal Nuevo León, listed in ascending order, as well as their results during the national Mexicana Universal pageant. State queens who represented the country in a current or past franchise of the national organization are also highlighted in a specific color.

Current Franchises:

- Competed at Miss Grand International.
- Competed at Miss International.
- Competed at Miss Charm.
- Competed at Reina Hispanoamericana.
- Competed at Miss Orb International.
- Competed at Nuestra Latinoamericana Universal.

Former Franchises:

- Competed at Miss Universe.
- Competed at Miss World.
- Competed at Miss Continente Americano.
- Competed at Miss Costa Maya International.
- Competed at Miss Atlántico Internacional.
- Competed at Miss Verano Viña del Mar.
- Competed at Reina de la Atlantida.
- Competed at Reina Internacional del Café.
- Competed at Top Model of the World.
- Competed at Miss Expo World.
- Competed at Nuestra Belleza Internacional.

Year	Titleholder	Hometown	Placement	Special Award	Notes
2025	Valery Sarahí Salazar Garza	San Nicolás de los Garza	-	-	Mexicana Universal Nuevo León 2023; Top 15 at Teen Universe México 2022; Teen Universe Nuevo León RM 2021; Top 15 at Teen Universe México 2021; Teen Universe Nuevo León 2020
2024	In 2024, due to changes in the dates of the national pageant, the election of the state queens was postponed for this year.				
2023	Valery Sarahí Salazar Garza; Withdrew from the national competition due to the postponement of the national pageant.	San Nicolás de los Garza	Did not Compete	-	Competed at Mexicana Universal 2026; Mexicana Universal Nuevo León 2025; Top 15 at Teen Universe México 2022; Teen Universe Nuevo León RM 2021; Top 15 at Teen Universe México 2021; Teen Universe Nuevo León 2020
2022	Dania Steysie Sánchez Niño	Aramberri	-	-	Competed at Miss Earth México 2017; Miss Earth Nuevo León 2017; Competed at Nuestra Belleza Nuevo León 2016; Competed at Miss Earth Nuevo León 2015; First married woman and mother from Nuevo León
2021	Mayra Carolina Valencia Gamez	Monterrey	1st Runner-up	-	Will Compete at Miss México 2026; Miss Nuevo León 2026
2020	In 2020, due to the contingency of COVID-19 there was a lag in the year of the state contest				
2019	Andrea Paola Martínez Bazarte	Guadalupe	Mexicana Hispanoamérica	HC Wellness Ambassadress	Top 5 at Miss Universe Latina 2025; Reina Hispanoamericana 2021; 13th Runner-up at Nuestra Belleza Latina 2018; First Mexican-american born in McAllen, Texas
2018	Claudia Lozano Domínguez	San Pedro Garza García	1st Runner-up	Steps to Fame	Competed at Nuestra Belleza Nuevo León 2014; Competed at Nuestra Belleza Nuevo León 2013; Competeed at Elite Model Look International 2009; Elite Model Look México 2009
2017	Andrea Merodio Reyes	Escobedo	Top 16	-	Top 16 at Miss Earth México 2016; Miss Earth Nuevo León 2016
Until 2016 the Title was Nuestra Belleza Nuevo León
2016	Rebeca Alicia Pérez Amor	Monterrey	Top 10	-	Competed at Miss Earth México 2014; Miss Earth Tamaulipas 2014; Competed at Nuestra Belleza Tamaulipas 2013; Nuestra Belleza Sur de Tamaulipas 2013; Was born in Tamaulipas
2015	Naomi Berenice Garza Mondragón	San Nicolás de los Garza	3rd Runner-up	-	3rd Runner-up at Miss Multiverse 2017; Miss Multiverse México 2017; Miss Supertalent of the World 2017; Miss Supertalent México 2017; Most Beautiful Girl in the World 2017; MBGW México 2017
2014	Alejandra Monserrat Medina Casas	Monterrey	Top 10	-	Competed at Miss F1 México 2015
2013	Vanesa Montemayor Cortez	Guadalupe	Top 10	-	Top 5 at Nuestra Belleza Mundo México 2013
2012	Cynthia Lizeth Duque Garza	Monterrey	Nuestra Belleza México	Queen's Choice; Personality Fraiche	4th Runner-up at Miss Continentes Unidos 2016; Miss México Continentes Unidos 2016; Competed at Miss Universe 2013; Top 5 at Nuestra Belleza Mundo México 2012
2012	Lucero Miroslava Montemayor Gracia (Assumed when Cynthia Duque became Nuestra Belleza México 2012)	Guadalupe	1st Runner-up	Miss Sports	Competed at Miss International 2013; Nuestra Belleza Internacional México 2013; 1st Runner-up at Nuestra Belleza Mundo México 2012; 1st Runner-up at Nuestra Belleza Nuevo León 2012; Señorita UANL 2011; Señorita Ciencias Químicas 2011
2011	Ivette Alejandra García de Hoyos	Monterrey	-	-	-
2010	Cynthia Alejandra de la Vega Oates	San Pedro Garza García	Nuestra Belleza Mundo México (Dethroned)	-	1st Runner-up at Miss Costa Maya International 2018; Miss México Costa Maya 2018; Top 25 at Miss Supranational 2016; Miss México Supranational 2016; Competed at Elite Model Look International 2008; Elite Model Look México 2008
2009	Adriana Graciela Treviño Peralta	Monterrey	Top 15	Steps to Fame	3rd Runner-up at Nuestra Belleza Nuevo León 2008
2008	Mariana González Elizondo	Monterrey	Top 10	Steps to Fame; Miss Talent	-
2007	Anagabriela Espinoza Marroquín	San Pedro Garza García	Nuestra Belleza Mundo México	Academic Award	Miss International 2009; Nuestra Belleza Internacional México 2009; Top 15 at Miss World 2008
2006	Mariana Lombard González	San Pedro Garza García	Top 10	-	-
2005	Silvia Priscila Perales Elizondo	San Pedro Garza García	Nuestra Belleza México	Fuller Beauty Queen; Miss Photogenic	Miss International 2007; Nuestra Belleza Internacional México 2007; Top 10 at Miss Universe 2006; 1st Runner-up at Nuestra Belleza Nuevo León 2004
2004	Ana Paola De la Parra Goldbaum	San Pedro Garza García	1st Runner-up	Academic Award	Was born in Baja California
2003	Alejandra Villanueva Campos	San Nicolás	1st Runner-up	Fuller Beauyu Queen	-
2002	Carolina Salinas González	Santiago	-	-	Miss Expo World 2002; Miss Expo World México 2002; Señorita Turismo Santiago 2001
2001	Diana Cristina García Soto (Resinged after national competition)	Monterrey	4th Runner-up	-	-
2001	Elsa Lucia Burgos Pérez (Assumed)	Monterrey	Top 20	-	Miss Costa Maya International 2002; Miss Costa Maya México 2002; Top 21 at Nuestra Belleza Mundo México 2001; 1st Runner-up at Nuestra Belleza Nuevo León 2001
2000	Verónica Penélope Gutiérrez de la Fuente	Monterrey	Top 10	-	Top 20 at Nuestra Belleza Mundo México 2000
1999	Vannessa María Valle Yves	Monterrey	Top 10	-	-
1998	Silvia Salgado Cavazos	Monterrey	Nuestra Belleza México	Miss Photogenic; Best Face	Top 10 at Miss Universe 1999; Competed at Reina Internacional del Café 1999; Reina del Café México 1999; Competed at Nuestra Belleza Nuevo León 1997; Was born in Coahuila
1997	Katty Fuentes García	Monterrey	Nuestra Belleza México	Miss Photogenic; Best Skin	Competed at Miss Universe 1998; 2nd Runner-up at Miss Atlántico Internacional 1998; Miss Atlántico México 1998; 2nd Runner-up at Nuestra Belleza Mundo México 1997
1996	Blanca Elena Martínez de la Fuente	Guadalupe	Top 16	-	Competed at Nuestra Belleza Internacional 1996; Nuestra Belleza Internacional México 1996
1995	Alejandra Aidée Quintero Velasco	Monterrey	Nuestra Belleza Mundo México	-	Top 10 en Miss World 1995
1994	Yadira Janeth Elizondo Montemayor	Monterrey	Top 16	Best Legs	Competed at The Top Model of the World 1996; Top Model of the World México 1996

== Designated Contestants ==
Starting in 2000, states were allowed to have more than one candidate, as some states were not sending candidates for various reasons. The following contestants from Nuevo León were invited to compete in the national pageant alongside the reigning queen, and in some cases, they achieved even better results.

Year	Titleholder	Hometown	Placement	Special Award	Notes
2011	Ángela Anahí Cantú Sánchez	Guadalupe	Top 15	-	2nd Runner-up at Nuestra Belleza Nuevo León 2011; Señorita UANL 2009; Señorita Odontología 2009
2007	Fabiola Jazmín Guajardo Martínez	Guadalupe	Top 15	-	1st Runner-up at Nuestra Belleza Nuevo León 2007
2006	Alejandra Ballesteros González	Guadalupe	Top 15	-	1st Runner-up at Nuestra Belleza Nuevo León 2006
2003	Alejandra Arredondo Méndez	Monterrey	Top 10	Lala Ligh Figure	Runner-up at Nuestra Belleza Nuevo León 2003
2003	Brisseida Myrella Moya Leal	Santiago	Top 20	-	Top 10 at Reinado Internacional del Café 2004; Reina del Café México 2004; Runner-up at Nuestra Belleza Nuevo León 2003
2000	Gisela Patricia Oviedo Garza	Monterrey	Top 20	-	Top 20 at Nuestra Belleza Mundo México 2000; 1st Runner-up at Nuestra Belleza Nuevo León 2000; Competed at Miss Caraïbes Hibiscus 2000; Miss Caribe México 2000; Competed at Señorita México 2000; Señorita Nayarit 2000

== See also ==
- Miss Nuevo León
- Miss Earth Nuevo León
