= Nuestra Belleza México 1998 =

5th edition of Nuestra Belleza México beauty pageant

- Date: September 19, 1998
- Presenters: Marco Antonio Regil, Lupita Jones
- Entertainment: Platón, Patricia Manterola, Caballo Dorado, Garibaldi
- Venue: Salon Teotihuacan, Centro Internacional de Convenciones Acapulco, Acapulco, Guerrero, Mexico
- Broadcaster: Televisa
- Entrants: 32
- Placements: 11
- Winner: Silvia Salgado; Nuevo León

Nuestra Belleza México 1998 was the 5th Nuestra Belleza México pageant. The contest was held for the second consecutive time at the Salon Teotihuacan of the Centro Internacional de Convenciones Acapulco of Acapulco, Guerrero, Mexico on September 19, 1998. Thirty-two contestants of the Mexican Republic competed for the national title, featuring the first back to back victories in Nuestra Belleza Mexico history: Silvia Salgado from Nuevo León was crowned by outgoing Nuestra Belleza México titleholder Katty Fuentes, also from Nuevo León. Salgado competed at Miss Universe 1999 in Trinidad and Tobago where she was a Semi-finalist in the Top 10. She was the second Neoleonesa to win this title.

The Nuestra Belleza Mundo México title was won by Vilma Zamora from Guanajuato, who later competed at Miss World 1998 in Seychelles. Zamora was crowned by outgoing Nuestra Belleza Mundo México titleholder Blanca Soto. She was the first Guanajuatense to win this title.

== Results ==
=== Placements ===
Final results	Contestant
Nuestra Belleza México 1998	Nuevo León – Silvia Salgado
Nuestra Belleza Mundo México 1998	Guanajuato – Vilma Zamora
Suplente/1st Runner-up	Tabasco – Edith López
2nd Runner-up	Quintana Roo – Solange Rivera
3rd Runner-up	Puebla – Luisa Fernanda Díaz
Top 11	Coahuila – Teresa Roldán; (Chihuahua (state)) Chihuahua – larissa Carrera; (Mexico City) Distrito Federal – Karla Blancarte; Jalisco – Alejandra Morales; Nayarit – Claudia González; Yucatán – Teresa Campos

- For the first and only time in the history of the contest was a tie in the top 10 among Yucatán and Chihuahua

== Contestants ==
State	Contestant	Age	Height (m)
Aguascalientes	Cecilia Colombe Gutiérrez Reyes	19	1.70
Baja California	Aneli Lucero Barajas López	19	1.83
Baja California Sur	Borinquen Telles Vargas	19	1.70
Campeche	Kathia Patricia Villegas Heredia	19	1.78
Coahuila	Teresa Roldán Rodríguez	20	1.75
Colima	Denisse Zarai Guzmán	19	1.75
Chiapas	Nubia Venicia León Montoya	19	1.68
(Chihuahua (state)) Chihuahua	Clarissa Carrera Aguilera	19	1.76
(Mexico City) Distrito Federal	Karla Blancarte Figueroa	21	1.73
Durango	Alejandra Fernández de Castro Sosa	19	1.75
(State of Mexico) Estado de México	Karen Maya Helm	20	1.73
Guanajuato	Vilma Verónica Zamora Suñol	19	1.78
Guerrero	Paulina Crofton Nadal †	23	1.81
(Hidalgo (state)) Hidalgo	Laura Gabriela Pérez Cuevas	18	1.68
Jalisco	Alejandra Morales Macias	19	1.78
Michoacán	Giovanna Páramo Garduño	20	1.75
Morelos	Arlette Natera Martínez	22	1.68
Nayarit	Claudia Liliana González Ramos	18	1.80
Nuevo León	Silvia Salgado Cavazos	20	1.75
Oaxaca	Marbella López Nuñez	22	1.68
Puebla	Luisa Fernanda Díaz Maldonado	19	1.69
Querétaro	Myriam Adaliz Domínguez Yemez	22	1.69
Quintana Roo	Solange Rivera Astudillo	21	1.70
San Luis Potosí	María Cristina Ramírez Portales	21	1.72
Sinaloa	Kathya Verenice Morales Luna	23	1.78
Sonora	Lina Mercedes Samaniego Jiménez	18	1.68
Tabasco	Edith López Vidaurri	22	1.75
Tamaulipas	Nayma Karina Balquiarena Pérez	18	1.69
Tlaxcala	Fabiola Sánchez Wadw	21	1.68
Veracruz	Maribel Rodríguez Gasca	18	1.70
Yucatán	María Teresa Campos Ríos	20	1.77
Zacatecas	Claudia Susana Landeros Botello	21	1.72

== Judges ==
- Verónica Castro – Actress
- Andrés García – Actor
- Dayanara Torres – Miss Universe 1993
- Héctor Soberón – Actor
- Alejandra Quintero – Nuestra Belleza Mundo México 1995
- José Quintero – Photographer
- Carla Estrada – Producer
- Joss Claude – Stylist
- Martha Chapa – Painter
- Luis Manuel Rodríguez – Director & Producer
