= Nuestra Belleza México 2017 =

23rd edition of Nuestra Belleza México

- Date: March 11, 2017
- Presenters: Héctor Sandarti, Ana Sofía Escobosa
- Entertainment: Álex Ubago, María José
- Venue: Foro 5, Televisa San Angel, Mexico City
- Broadcaster: Televisa
- Entrants: 32
- Placements: 15
- Withdrawals: Campeche; Quintana Roo; Zacatecas
- Returns: Chiapas; San Luis Potosí
- Winner: Denisse Iridiane Franco Piña; Sinaloa

The 23rd annual Nuestra Belleza México pageant held on March 11, 2017. Contestants from around Mexico competed for the national title, which was won by Denisse Franco from Sinaloa who will compete at Miss Universe 2017. Denisse was crowned by outgoing Nuestra Belleza México titleholder Kristal Silva. Denisse is the third Sinaloa to win this title.

== Results ==
=== Placements ===
Color keys

- The contestant won in an International pageant.
- The contestant was a Finalist/Runner-up in an International pageant.
- The contestant was a Semi-Finalist in an International pageant.
- The contestant did not place.

Placement	Contestant	International Placement
Nuestra Belleza México 2017	Sinaloa – Denisse Franco	Unplaced – Miss Universe 2017
1st Runner-Up	Tamaulipas – Citlaly Higuera	Unplaced – Miss International 2017
2nd Runner-Up	Aguascalientes – Karla López	3rd Runner-Up – Reina Hispanoamericana 2017
3rd Runner-Up	Jalisco – Goretti Robles	1st Runner-Up – Miss Model of the World 2017
4th Runner-Up	Sinaloa – Yareli Carrillo	
Top 10	Sonora – María José Antillón; Jalisco – Adriana Mardueño; Nuevo León – Rebeca Amor; Querétaro – Laila Kuri; Yucatán – Rossana Kin	
Top 15	Chihuahua – Janeth Loya; Colima – Margarita Magaña; Nayarit – Jocelyn Preciado; Puebla – Carmen Cabildo; Querétaro – Ana Luisa Ganuza	

== Contestants ==
32 contestants competed for the title.

State	Contestant	Age	Height	Hometown
Aguascalientes	Karla María López Berumen	20	1.80	Aguascalientes
Baja California	Nancy Verónica Moeller Guerrero	24	1.76	Tijuana
Baja California	Kenia Melissa Ponce Beltrán	24	1.70	Mexicali
Baja California Sur	Alma Guadalupe Moreno Montaño	24	1.70	Los Cabos
Chiapas	Andrea Celeste Zenteno Vázquez	21	1.73	Tuxtla Gutiérrez
(Chihuahua (state)) Chihuahua	Janeth Loya Trillo	20	1.75	Cd. Juárez
Coahuila	Edna Kikey Sato De la Cruz	23	1.72	Piedras Negras
Colima	Margarita Magaña Vega	23	1.75	Colima
(Mexico City) Ciudad de México	Marielle Ruesga Castañeiras	22	1.79	Mexico City
Durango	Alexandra Maldonado Gallardo	18	1.68	Durango
(State of Mexico) Estado de México	Eliany Rubio Pérez	21	1.72	Atizapán de Zaragoza
Guanajuato	Valentina Krauss Moreno	23	1.75	Guanajuato
(Hidalgo (state)) Hidalgo	Claudia Michelle Rodríguez Berlanga	22	1.73	Pachuca
Jalisco	Adriana Mardueño Villaseñor	24	1.75	Autlán de Navarro
Jalisco	Ángela Goretti Robles Ibarra	24	1.81	Guadalajara
Michoacán	Renata Padilla Espinoza	19	1.73	Lázaro Cárdenas
Morelos	Constanza Oscós Gordillo	20	1.70	Cuernavaca
Nayarit	Joselyn Preciado Becerra	18	1.80	Rosamorada
Nuevo León	Rebeca Alicia Pérez Amor	24	1.81	Monterrey
Oaxaca	Dinora Masiel Osorio Espinosa	21	1.73	Oaxaca de Juárez
Puebla	María del Carmen Cabildo Bolaños	24	1.70	Puebla
Querétaro	Ana Luisa Ganuza Pérez	24	1.68	Querétaro
Querétaro	Laila Kuri Baños	21	1.73	Querétaro
San Luis Potosí	María Fernanda Zepeda Villarreal	23	1.71	San Luis Potosí
Sinaloa	Denisse Iridane Franco Piña	19	1.76	Culiacán
Sinaloa	Yareli Guadalupe Carrillo Salas	27	1.78	Culiacán
Sonora	María José Antillón Mayorga	18	1.82	Ciudad Obregón
Tabasco	Itzel Semina Torruco Flores	20	1.76	Villahermosa
Tamaulipas	Citlaly Higuera López	22	1.73	Ciudad Madero
Tlaxcala	Karla Hernández Rodríguez	21	1.74	Tetla de la Solidaridad
Veracruz	Estefanía Ruiz Iñiguez	22	1.78	Úrsulo Galván
Yucatán	Rossana Kin Castillo	20	1.82	Mérida

=== Replacements ===
- Nayarit – Estefania Carrillo was the winner of Nuesta Belleza Nayarit 2016 but resigned from the title because of personal reasons. The Suplente/1st Runner-up, Joselyn Preciado will represent Nayarit in Nuestra Belleza México 2017.
- Puebla – Diana Leal was the winner of Nuestra Belleza Puebla 2016. The Suplente/1st Runner-up, Carmen Cabildo obtained the title after Diana Leal was dethroned for undisclosed reasons.

=== Returning states ===
- Last competed in 2014:
  - Chiapas
  - San Luis Potosí

=== Crossovers ===
Contestants who have competed or will compete at other beauty pageants:

Miss Earth México

- 2014: Nuevo León: Rebeca Pérez Amor
  - Tamaulipas's representative
- 2014: Chiapas: Andrea Zenteno. (First runner-up)
- 2014: Sinaloa: Yareli Carrillo (Winner)

Nuestra Belleza Coahuila

- 2015: Coahuila: Kikey Sato

Nuestra Belleza Tamaulipas

- 2013: Nuevo León: Rebeca Pérez Amor

Miss Earth Tamaulipas

- 2014: Nuevo León: Rebeca Pérez Amor (Winner)

Srta Perla del Guadiana

- 2016: Durango: Alejandra Maldonado (Winner)
