= Miss Tlaxcala =

Beauty pageant in Tlaxcala, Mexico

- Formation: 2016
- Type: Beauty pageant
- Headquarters: Tlaxcala
- Location: Mexico
- Local Coordinator: Humberto Becerra

Miss Tlaxcala is a state-level contest in the state of Tlaxcala, Mexico, which selects the state representative for the national contest Miss México, thus aspiring to represent the country internationally on one of the platforms offered.

The state organization has achieved the following results since 2016:

- Top 10/11: 2 (2017, 2019)
- Top 16: 1 (2021)
- Unplaced: 3 (2016, 2018, 2023, 2025)

== National Queens ==
- Fedra Alpeas - Miss México Top Model of the World 2022 (Designated)

== Titleholders ==
The following are the names of the annual winners of Miss Tlaxcala, listed in ascending order, as well as their results during the national Miss México pageant. State queens who represented the country in a current or past franchise of the national organization are also highlighted in a specific color.

Current Franchises:

- Competed at Miss World.
- Competed at Miss Supranational.
- Competed at Miss Cosmo.
- Competed at Miss Elite.
- Competed at Top Model of the World.
- Competed at Reina Internacional del Café.
- Competed at Reina Mundial del Banano.
- Competed at Miss Continentes Unidos.
- Competed at Miss Global City.

Former Franchises:

- Competed at Miss Grand International.
- Competed at Miss Costa Maya International.

| Year | Titleholder | Hometown | Placement | Special Award | Notes |
|---|---|---|---|---|---|
| 2026 | TBA | | | | |
| 2025 | Alondra Orencio | - | - | - | - |
| 2024 | In 2024, due to changes in the dates of the national pageant, the election of the state queens was postponed for one year. | | | | |
| 2023 | Amayrany Castillo Cruz | Tetla de la Solidaridad | - | - | Top 10 at Miss México Supranational 2025; Competed at Miss Turismo Tlaxcala 2023 |
| 2022 | In 2022, due to changes in the dates of the national pageant, the election of the state queens was postponed for one year. | | | | |
| 2021 | Rosa Liliana Silva Flores | Apizaco | Top 16 | Miss Sports | Competed at Miss Michoacán 2016; Was born in Michoacán |
| 2020 | In 2020, due to the contingency of COVID-19 there was a lag in the year of the state contest | | | | |
| 2019 | Fedra Alondra Pérez Solís | Ciudad Hidalgo | Top 10 | - | Top 10 at Miss Universe Mexico 2025; Miss Universe Michoacán 2025; Competed at Top Model of the World 2022; Miss México Top Model of the World 2022; Competed at Miss Michoacán 2019; Was born and raised in Michoacán |
| 2018 | Daniela Fernanda Hernández Diaz (Resigned) | Chiautempan | - | - | Reina de las Fiestas Patrias 2017; 1st Princess at Reina de Carnaval Chiautempan 2016; Señorita Canaco Servytur 2016; 1st Runner-up at Reina de la Feria Tlaxcala 2015; Reina de la Feria Chiautempan 2014 |
| 2018 | Angélica Rodríguez de Gyves (Assumed) | Apizaco | - | - | - |
| 2017 | Elizabeth Ramírez Martin | Ixtenco | Top 16 | Head to Head | Top 12 at Miss México Grand 2020; Competed at Miss Morelos 2017 |
| 2016 | Areli García González | Tlaxcala | - | - | Reina de la Feria de Tlaxcala 2014 |

== See also ==
- Mexicana Universal Tlaxcala
