= Nuestra Belleza Chiapas 2010 =

- Date: July 27, 2010
- Venue: Polyforum Chiapas, Tuxtla Gutiérrez, Chiapas
- Broadcaster: TV10 (Local Public TV)
- Entrants: 12
- Placements: 5
- Winner: Grissel Hernández

Nuestra Belleza Chiapas 2010, was held at the Polyforum Chiapas, Tuxtla Gutiérrez, Chiapas on July 27, 2010. At the conclusion of the final night of competition, Grissel Hernández of Tecpatán was crowned the winner. Hernández was crowned by outgoing Nuestra Belleza Chiapas titleholder, Claudia Espinoza. Twelve contestants competed for the state title.

== Results ==
=== Placements ===
Final results	Contestant
Nuestra Belleza Chiapas 2010	Grissel Hernández
Nuestra Belleza Turismo Chiapas 2011	Fernanda Gutiérrez
Reina de la Feria de Chiapas 2011	Esperanza Hilerio
Suplente / 1st Runner-up	Valeria Ruiz
2nd Runner-up	Andrea Coello

== Background Music ==
- Erik Rubin
- Christian Chávez

== Contestants ==
Hometown	Contestant
Acapetahua	Esperanza Hilerio
Catazajá	Andrea Coello
Tuxtla Gutierrez	Stephanie Pimentel
Comitán	Zuleyma Nuricumbo
Tuxtla Gutierrez	Irene Quinteros
Palenque	Fernanda Gutiérrez
Cintalapa	Jessica Garcia
Tapachula	Carolina del Río
Tecpatán	Grissel Hernández
Comitán	Karen Lazcano Córdoba
Villa Corzo	Lupita Ruíz
Villaflores	Karla Montesinos
