= Mexicana Universal Sinaloa =

- Formation: 1994 (as Nuestra Belleza Sinaloa); 2017 (as Mexicana Universal Sinaloa)
- Type: Beauty Pageant
- Headquarters: Culiacán
- Location: Mexico
- Local Coordinator: Perla Beltrán

Mexicana Universal Sinaloa (until 2016 called Nuestra Belleza Sinaloa) is a state-level contest in the state of Sinaloa, Mexico, which selects the state representative for the national contest Mexicana Universal (formerly called Nuestra Belleza México), thus aspiring to represent the country internationally on one of the platforms offered.

The state organization has achieved the following results since 1994:

- Winner: 7 (2000, 2002, 2006, 2008, 2016, 2022, 2023)
- 1st Runner-up: 3 (1999, 2008, 2019)
- 2nd Runner-up: 3 (2009, 2011, 2017)
- Top 5/6: 2 (1994, 2016)
- Top 10/11/12: 3 (2000, 2001, 2011)
- Top 15/16: 5 (1995, 1997, 2010, 2012, 2014)
- Top 20/21: 4 (2000, 2001, 2004, 2018)
- Unplaced: 11 (1998, 2000, 2002, 2005, 2007, 2012, 2013, 2014, 2015, 2018, 2021)
- Absences: 1 (2023)

== National Queens ==
- Pety Juárez - Mexicana Grand Internacional 2026
- Carolina Pérez - Mexicana Hispanoamericana 2023
- Deborah Hallal - Mexicana Universal 2021 (Designated)
- Denisse Franco - Nuestra Belleza México 2017
- Laura Zúñiga - Nuestra Belleza Internacional México 2009 (Designated/Dethroned)
- Laura Zúñiga - Reina Hispanoamericana México 2009 (Designated/Dethroned)
- Perla Beltrán - Nuestra Belleza Mundo México 2008
- Rosa María Ojeda - Nuestra Belleza México 2006
- Rosalva Luna - Nuestra Belleza México 2003
- Claudia Collado - Miss Atlántico México 2002 (Designated)
- Paulina Flores - Nuestra Belleza Mundo México 2000
- Lynette Delgado - Nuestra Belleza Internacional México 1999 (Designated/Resigned)
- Amina Blancarte - Nuestra Belleza Internacional México 1995 (Designated)

== International Queens ==
- Laura Zúñiga - Reina Hispanoamericana 2008 (Winner/Dethroned)
- Perla Beltrán - Miss World Americas 2009
- Amina Blancarte - Nuestra Belleza Internacional 1995

== Titleholders ==
The following are the names of the annual winners of Mexicana Universal Sinaloa, listed in ascending order, as well as their results during the national Mexicana Universal pageant. State queens who represented the country in a current or past franchise of the national organization are also highlighted in a specific color.

Current Franchises:

- Competed at Miss Grand International.
- Competed at Miss International.
- Competed at Miss Charm.
- Competed at Reina Hispanoamericana.
- Competed at Miss Orb International.
- Competed at Nuestra Latinoamericana Universal.

Former Franchises:

- Competed at Miss Universe.
- Competed at Miss World.
- Competed at Miss Continente Americano.
- Competed at Miss Costa Maya International.
- Competed at Miss Atlántico Internacional.
- Competed at Miss Verano Viña del Mar.
- Competed at Reina Internacional del Café.
- Competed at Reina Internacional de las Flores.
- Competed at Señorita Continente Americano.
- Competed at Nuestra Belleza Internacional.

Year	Titleholder	Hometown	Placement	Special Award	Notes
2025	Pety Vianey Juárez Elizalde	Angostura	Mexicana Grand Internacional	Dabalash Ambassador	5th Runner-up at Miss Grand International 2026; 1st Runner-up at Mexicana Universal Sinaloa 2023; Competed at Miss Teen Americas 2015; Miss Teen Americas México 2015; Reina de Reinas Sinaloa 2015; Reina del Carnaval Angostura 2015
2024	In 2024, due to changes in the dates of the national pageant, the election of the state queens was postponed for one year.				
2023	Libia Zulema Gavica Farriols; Withdrew from the national competition due to the postponement of the national pageant.	Mazatlán	Did not Compete	-	Reina del Carnaval de Mazatlán 2020; Libia Zulema López's Granddaughter, Señorita México 1970 & Reina del Carnaval de Mazatlán 1970; Libia Zulema Farriols' Daughter, Señorita Sinaloa 1992 & Reina de los Juegos Florales 1990; Pamela Farriols' niece, Reina del Carnaval de Mazatlán 2000; Daniela Tostado Farriols' cousin, Reina del Carnaval de Mazatlán 2016
2022	Carolina Pérez Martínez	Mazatlán	Mexicana Hispanoamericana	-	Top 13 at Reina Hispanoamericana 2023; Reina del Carnaval de Mazatlán 2022
2021	Christel Leticia Ortiz Félix (Resigned)	Culiacán	Did not Compete	-	-
2021	Deisy Itzel Unzueta Cázares (Assumed)	Navolato	-	-	1st Runner-up at Mexicana Universal Sinaloa 2021
2020	In 2020, due to the contingency of COVID-19 there was a lag in the year of the state contest				
2019	Débora Hallal Ayala	Los Mochis	1st Runner-up	Hair Salerm Cosmetics	Competed at Miss Universe 2021; Mexicana Universal 2021; Top 5 at Mexicana Universal Sinaloa 2018; Top 10 at Miss Teen Mundial 2016; Miss Teen Mundial México 2016
2018	Carla Mariant Sánchez González	Mocorito	-	-	Reina del Baile de Embajadoras Elota 2017; Diosa Colhuacán 2015
2017	Maryely Leal Cervantes	Guasave	2nd Runner-up	Steps to Fame	Competed at Miss World 2025; Miss México 2024; Top 6 at Miss México Top Model of the World 2024; Miss Sinaloa 2023
Until 2016 the Title was Nuestra Belleza Sinaloa
2016	Denisse Iridane Franco Piña	Culiacán	Nuestra Belleza México	-	Competed at Miss Universe 2017
2016	Yareli Guadalupe Carrillo Salas (Assumed when Denisse Franco became Nuestra Belleza México 2017)	Culiacán	Top 5	-	1st Runner-up at Nuestra Belleza Sinaloa 2016; Competed at Miss Eco Queen 2015; Miss Eco México 2015; Top 16 at Miss Earth 2014; Miss Earth México 2014; Miss Earth Sinaloa 2014
2015	Norma Patricia de la Vega Zazueta	Culiacán	-	-	2nd Runner-up at Nuestra Belleza Sinaloa 2012
2014	Stefy Unzueta Cázares	Navolato	-	-	-
2013	Irma Cecilia Padilla Soto	Culiacán	-	-	-
2012	Ana Karime Macías Olson	Mazatlán	Top 15	-	-
2011	Grecia Yoselin Gutiérrez Godoy	Los Mochis	2nd Runner-up	Miss Congeniality	-
2010	Tiaré Kristal Oliva Elguezabal	Topolobampo	Top 15	Best National Costume	-
2009	Gabriela Quintero Martínez	Los Mochis	2nd Runner-up	Miss Top Model	-
2008	Laura Elena Zúñiga Huizar (Dethroned)	Culiacán	1st Runner-up (Dethroned)	Miss Congeniality	Reina Hispanoamericana 2008 (Dethroned); Nuestra Belleza Internacional 2009 (Dethroned)
2008	Perla Judith Beltrán Acosta (Assumed)	Guamúchil	Nuestra Belleza Mundo México	Miss Top Model; Best Hair Optims	Miss World Americas 2009; 1st Runner-up at Miss World 2009; Miss Earth México-Air 2007; Miss Earth Sinaloa 2007; Reina del Carnaval de Guamúchil 2004
2007	Yesica Morales Zazueta	Culiacán	-	-	-
2006	Rosa María Ojeda Cuen	Culiacán	Nuestra Belleza México	Fuller Beauty Queen	Top 10 at Miss Universe 2007; Miss Turismo México 2004; Señorita Sinaloa 2003; Competed at Miss Expo World 2002; 1st Runner-up at Miss Piel Dorada Internacional 2002; Miss Piel Dorada México 2002
2005	Alondra del Carmen Robles Dobler	Mazatlán	-	-	Competed at Miss International 2006; Competed at Miss Tourism Queen International 2006; Miss Turismo México 2006; Miss Turismo Sinaloa 2006
2004	Emma Lucía Aragón Sánchez	Culiacán	Top 20	-	Competed at Miss Global Beauty Queen 2005
2003	Rosalva Yazmín Luna Ruíz	Los Mochis	Nuestra Belleza México	Best National Costume; Miss Internet'	Top 15 at Miss Universe 2004
2002	Claudia Karina Cota Gastélum	Culiacán	-	-	-
2001	Rosa Alicia León Soto	Mazatlán	Top 20	-	Competed at Miss Mesoamérica International 2002; Top 21 at Nuestra Belleza Mundo México 2001
2000	Paulina Flores Arias	Culiacán	Nuestra Belleza Mundo México	Trident Smile	Top 5 at Miss Mesoamérica 2001; Miss Mesoamérica México 2001; Competed at Miss World 2000
1999	Lynette Delgado Gastélum	Los Mochis	1st Runner-up (Resigned)	Miss Photogenic; Miss Personality; Miss Dorian Grey	Nuestra Belleza Internacional México 1999 (Resigned)
1998	Kathya Berenice Morales Luna	Mazatlán	-	-	Reina del Carnaval de Mazatlán 1992
1997	Deyanira Liliana Penney López	Culiacán	Top 16	-	-
1996	Celia Gloria Chavez Carrasco	El Rosario	5th Runner-up	-	Reina del Carnaval de Mazatlán 1994
1995	Dalina de la Peña Montoya	Guamúchil	Top 16	-	2nd Runner-up at Señorita Sinaloa 1994; Señorita Salvador Alvarado 1994
1994	Helen Amina Blancarte Tirado	Mazatlán	Top 6	Best Hair; Best National Costume	Nuestra Belleza Internacional 1995; Nuestra Belleza Internacional México 1995; Reina del Carnaval de Mazatlán 1993

== Designated Contestants ==
Starting in 2000, states were allowed to have more than one candidate, as some states were not sending candidates for various reasons. The following contestants from Sinaloa were invited to compete in the national pageant alongside the reigning queen, and in some cases, they achieved even better results.

Year	Titleholder	Hometown	Placement	Special Award	Notes
2018	Alejandra Rubí Pérez López	Culiacán	Top 20	Model New York Fashion Week	1st Runner-up at Mexicana Universal Sinaloa 2018; Miss Earth México-Fire 2018; Miss Earth Sinaloa 2018; 2nd Runner-up at Miss Earth Sinaloa 2017; 1st Princess at Reina Folclore México 2016; Reina Folclore Sinaloa 2016; 4th Runner-up at Miss Teenager 2015; Miss Teenager México 2015; Top 15 at Miss Teen International H2O Ambassador 2015; Miss Teen H2O México 2015
2014	Kynué Mascareño Lugo	Guamúchil	Top 15	-	Competed at Miss F1 México 2015; Top 5 at Nuestra Belleza Mundo México 2014
2012	Briseyda Zazueta López	Culiacán	-	-	-
2011	Paloma del Rocío Llanes Germán	Los Mochis	Top 10	-	Miss Mesoamérica International 2015; Miss Mesoamérica México 2015; Nuestra Belleza Ahome 2011
2001	Claudia Collado Careaga	Los Mochis	Top 10	-	Top 12 at Miss Tourism Queen International 2005; Competed at Miss Atlántico Internacional 2002; Miss Atlántico México 2002; Top 21 at Nuestra Belleza Mundo México 2001
2001	Mónica Psihas González	Culiacán	Top 10	-	Top 21 at Nuestra Belleza Mundo México 2001
2000	María González Corrales	Culiacán	Top 20	-	Top 20 at Nuestra Belleza Mundo México 2000
2000	Minerva Janeth Valenzuela	Culiacán	-	-	-
2000	Minerva Abigail Rivera Mendiola	Los Mochis	Top 10	Lala Light Figure	Top 20 at Nuestra Belleza Mundo México 2000
