= Nuestra Belleza México 2016 =

22nd edition of Nuestra Belleza México

- Date: January 31, 2016
- Presenters: Karla Gómez; Jan
- Entertainment: Mario Bautista; Playa Limbo; Río Roma
- Venue: Foro 2, Televisa San Angel, Mexico City, Mexico
- Broadcaster: Televisa
- Entrants: 29
- Placements: 15
- Withdrawals: Chiapas; San Luis Potosi
- Returns: Campeche; Quintana Roo
- Winner: Kristal Silva; Tamaulipas

Nuestra Belleza México 2016, the 22nd annual Nuestra Belleza México pageant, was held at Foro 2 of Televisa San Angel in Mexico City on January 31, 2016. Twenty-nine contestants from Mexico competed for the national title, which was won by Kristal Silva from Tamaulipas who also competed in Miss Universe 2016. Silva was crowned by the outgoing Nuestra Belleza México titleholder Wendolly Esparza. She is the third person from Tamaulipas to win the title.

After three consecutive years, the final show of "Nuestra Belleza Mundo México" not was held. Rumors said that this was due to financing issues involving the renewal of the franchise. Other rumors also said that should it be renewed then the Mexican representative would be elected by the designation of a prior participant. On April 26, 2016 the Nuestra Belleza México Organization announced that they will not send a representative to Miss World after 21 years of having done so for the national organization.

The recognition "Corona al Mérito 2016" was for Carolina Morán, Nuestra Belleza Mundo México 2006 and TV hostess.

== Results ==
=== Placements ===
Placement	Contestant
Nuestra Belleza México 2016	Tamaulipas – Kristal Silva
1st Runner-Up	Sonora – Irma Miranda
2nd Runner-Up	Nayarit – Geraldine Ponce
3rd Runner-Up	Nuevo León – Naomi Mondragón
4th Runner-Up	Yucatán – Yaris Cháidez
Top 10	Michoacán – Magdalena Chiprés; Aguascalientes – Maria Gabriela Martín; Campeche – Ana Lilia Alpuche; Jalisco – Mariana Franco; Querétaro – Michelle León
Top 15	Colima – Giovanna Salazar; Puebla – Lorena Chayban; Tabasco – Tania Pérez; Tlaxcala – Valeria Gongóra; Veracruz – Arely Espinoza

== Contestants ==
State	Contestant	Age	Height	Hometown
Aguascalientes	María Gabriela Martín Del Campo Bonilla	21	1.73	Aguascalientes
Baja California	Cynthia Paola Valdez Ruiz	21	1.68	Tijuana
Baja California Sur	Dulce Vanessa Reyes Zaragoza	21	1.72	La Paz
Campeche	Ana Lilia Alpuche Tovar	23	1.70	San Francisco de Campeche
(Chihuahua (state)) Chihuahua	Celeste Espinoza Portillo	21	1.81	Parral
(Mexico City) Ciudad de México	Stephanie Dash Karam Tovar	23	1.70	Mexico City
Coahuila	Ana Lucila Linaje Esquivel	18	1.74	Monclova
Colima	Laura Giovanna Salazar García	21	1.70	Villa de Álvarez
Durango	Viveck Nevárez Marín	20	1.75	Durango
(State of Mexico) Estado de México	Lucía Moreno Noriega	19	1.72	Toluca
Guanajuato	Daniela Marcela Arellano Gómez	22	1.73	León
(Hidalgo (state)) Hidalgo	Nicktell Rodríguez Apodaca	19	1.80	Pachuca
Jalisco	Mariana Franco Anguiano	22	1.76	Tonalá
Michoacán	Magdalena Chipres Herrera	20	1.74	Zamora
Morelos	Rebeca Garavito Bergantiños	21	1.69	Cuernavaca
Nayarit	Geraldine Ponce	21	1.79	Xalisco
Nuevo León	Naomi Berenice Garza Mondragón	22	1.76	San Nicolás de los Garza
Oaxaca	Claudia Elena Bravo Barradas	23	1.73	Tuxtepec
Puebla	Lorena Chayban Abdul Massih	21	1.74	Puebla
Querétaro	Michelle León López	22	1.74	Querétaro City
Quintana Roo	Salma Betsabé Sosa Herrera	18	1.70	Cancún
Sinaloa	Norma Patricia De la Vega Zazueta	22	1.74	Culiacán
Sonora	Irma Cristina Miranda Valenzuela	19	1.78	Cd. Obregón
Tabasco	Tania Kirey Pérez Quevedo	23	1.72	Villahermosa
Tamaulipas	Yuselmi Cristal Silva Davila	24	1.80	Ciudad Victoria
Tlaxcala	Valeria Noemí Góngora Dorantes	22	1.72	Tlaxcala
Veracruz	Arely Betsabé Espinosa Jiménez	23	1.78	Poza Rica
Yucatán	Yaris Cháidez Zumaya	21	1.74	Mérida
Zacatecas	Eliana Villegas Arellano	23	1.75	Florencia de Benito Juárez

== Replacements ==
- Guanajuato – Samantha Peña was the winner of Nuestra Belleza Guanajuato 2015. The 2nd Runner-up, Daniela Arellano will represent Guanajuato in Nuestra Belleza México 2015. Peña renounced the title for reasons concerning her studies.

=== Returning states ===
- Last competed in 2011:
  - Quintana Roo
- Last competed in 2013:
  - Campeche

=== Withdrawals ===
- Chiapas
- Guanajuato – Samantha Peña
- Guerrero – Susana Rentería
- San Luis Potosí
