= Mexicana Universal Oaxaca =

Beauty contest

- Formation: 1994 (as Nuestra Belleza Oaxaca); 2017 (as Mexicana Universal Oaxaca)
- Type: Beauty Pageant
- Headquarters: Oaxaca
- Location: Mexico
- Local Coordinator: Cristina Espejo

Mexicana Universal Oaxaca (until 2016 called Nuestra Belleza Oaxaca) is a state-level contest in the state of Oaxaca, Mexico, which selects the state representative for the national contest Mexicana Universal (formerly called Nuestra Belleza México), thus aspiring to represent the country internationally on one of the platforms offered.

The state organization has achieved the following results since 1994:

- Winner: 1 (2019)
- 4th Runner-up: 1 (2018)
- Top 15/16: 2 (1996, 2017)
- Unplaced: 16 (1994, 1995, 1997, 1998, 1999, 2009, 2010, 2011, 2012, 2013, 2014, 2015, 2016, 2021, 2022, 2025)
- Absences: 9 (2000, 2001, 2002, 2003, 2004, 2005, 2006, 2007, 2023)

== National Queens ==
- Ángeles Castro - Nuestra Latinoamericana Universal 2021
- Ángeles Aguilar - Reina Hispanoamericana México 2010 (Designated)

== Titleholders ==
The following are the names of the annual winners of Mexicana Universal Oaxaca, listed in ascending order, as well as their results during the national Mexicana Universal pageant. State queens who represented the country in a current or past franchise of the national organization are also highlighted in a specific color.

Current Franchises:

- Competed at Miss Grand International.
- Competed at Miss International.
- Competed at Miss Charm.
- Competed at Reina Hispanoamericana.
- Competed at Miss Orb International.
- Competed at Nuestra Latinoamericana Universal.

Former Franchises:

- Competed at Miss Universe.
- Competed at Miss World.
- Competed at Miss Continente Americano.
- Competed at Miss Costa Maya International.
- Competed at Miss Atlántico Internacional.
- Competed at Miss Verano Viña del Mar.
- Competed at Reina Internacional del Café.
- Competed at Reina Internacional de las Flores.
- Competed at Señorita Continente Americano.
- Competed at Nuestra Belleza Internacional.

| Year | Titleholder | Hometown | Placement | Special Award | Notes |
|---|---|---|---|---|---|
| 2025 | Erika Fernanda Cazares Sibaja | Nejapa de Madero | - | - | - |
| 2024 | In 2024, due to changes in the dates of the national pageant, the election of the state queens was postponed for one year. | | | | |
| 2023 | Estefany Luna; Withdrew from the national competition due to the postponement of the national pageant. | Oaxaca | Did not Compete | - | Top 10 at Miss Universe México 2026; Miss Universe Oaxaca 2026 |
| 2022 | Ximena Montiel Wong | Oaxaca | - | - | Compited at Mexicana Universal Oaxaca 2021; Was born in Mexico City |
| 2021 | Scanda Joseline Castillo Alvarado | Loma Bonita | - | - | 2nd Runner-up at Nuestra Belleza Oaxaca 2016; Competed at Nuestra Belleza Oaxaca 2015 |
| 2020 | In 2020, due to the contingency of COVID-19 there was a lag in the year of the state contest | | | | |
| 2019 | Ángeles Alma Castro Chávez | Oaxaca | NLU México | - | Competed at Mexicana Universal Oaxaca 2017 |
| 2018 | Cintya Karen Avendaño Bamaca | Oaxaca | 4th Runner-up | - | Competed at Nuestra Belleza Oaxaca 2016 |
| 2017 | Sayra Yarith Cerón Enríquez | Oaxaca | Top 16 | - | Top 16 at Miss Earth México 2012; Miss Earth Oaxaca 2012 |
Until 2016 the Title was Nuestra Belleza Oaxaca
| 2016 | Dinora Masiel Osorio Espinosa | Oaxaca | - | - | - |
| 2015 | Claudia Elena Bravo Barradas | Tuxtepec | - | - | Competed at Nuestra Belleza Veracruz 2012; Nuestra Belleza Boca del Río 2012 |
| 2014 | Nayra Garibo González | Tuxtepec | - | - | Competed at Nuestra Belleza Veracruz 2013; Nuestra Belleza Puerto de Veracruz 2013 |
| 2013 | Yamilé Guerrero Hernández | Loma Bonita | - | - | - |
| 2012 | Almudena Villasante Palau | Oaxaca | - | - | - |
| 2011 | María Teresa Raviela Guerrero | Río Grande | - | - | - |
| 2010 | Alejandra Díaz Scherenberg | Río Grande | - | - | - |
| 2009 | Denise Mendiola Chávez | Oaxaca | - | - | - |
| 2008 | Ángeles Aguilar del Puerto | Oaxaca | Top 15 | - | Competed at Reina Hispanoamericana 2010; Reina Hispanoamericana México 2010; Elsa Aguilar's sister, Nuestra Belleza Oaxaca 1999 |
| 2007 | No candidate was sent | | | | |
| 2006 | No candidate was sent | | | | |
| 2005 | No candidate was sent | | | | |
| 2004 | No candidate was sent | | | | |
| 2003 | No candidate was sent | | | | |
| 2002 | No candidate was sent | | | | |
| 2001 | No candidate was sent | | | | |
| 2000 | No candidate was sent | | | | |
| 1999 | Elsa Aguilar del Puerto | Oaxaca | - | - | Ángeles Aguila's sister, Nuestra Belleza Oaxaca 2008 |
| 1998 | Marbella López Núñez | Oaxaca | - | - | Was born in Sinaloa |
| 1997 | Annemie Santibáñez Hoffman | Huajuapan de León | - | - | - |
| 1996 | Karin Román Peillet | Huajuapan de León | Top 16 | - | - |
| 1995 | Valeria Victorino Mungaray | Oaxaca | - | - | - |
| 1994 | Perla Xóchitl Chávez Ruíz | Salina Cruz | - | - | - |

== Designated Contestants ==
Starting in 2000, states were allowed to have more than one candidate, as some states were not sending candidates for various reasons. The following contestants from Oaxaca were invited to compete in the national pageant alongside the reigning queen, and in some cases, they achieved even better results.

| Year | Titleholder | Hometown | Placement | Special Award | Notes |
|---|---|---|---|---|---|
| 2012 | Michelle Mendoza García | Matías Romero | - | She was the Virtual Casting's Winner | |

== See also ==
- Miss Oaxaca
