= Mexicana Universal Tabasco =

- Formation: 1994 (as Nuestra Belleza Tabasco); 2017 (as Mexicana Universal Tabasco)
- Type: Beauty Pageant
- Headquarters: Villahermosa
- Location: Mexico

Mexicana Universal Tabasco (until 2016 called Nuestra Belleza Tabasco) is a state-level contest in the state of Tabasco, Mexico, which selects the state representative for the national contest Mexicana Universal (formerly called Nuestra Belleza México), thus aspiring to represent the country internationally on one of the platforms offered.

The state organization has achieved the following results since 1994:

- 1st Runner-up: 2 (1998, 2017)
- 4th Runner-up: 1 (1997)
- Top 10/11/12: 3 (2002, 2013, 2025)
- Top 15/16: 4 (1994, 2008, 2015, 2022)
- Top 20/21: 1 (2018)
- Unplaced: 12 (1995, 1996, 1999, 2000, 2001, 2010, 2011, 2012, 2014, 2016, 2019, 2021)
- Absences: 7 (2003, 2004, 2005, 2006, 2007, 2009, 2023)

== National Queens ==
- Aranza Molina - Mexicana Hispanoamericana 2018 (Designated)
- Karla Corral - Reina del Café México 1998 (Designated)

== Titleholders ==
The following are the names of the annual winners of Mexicana Universal Tabasco, listed in ascending order, as well as their results during the national Mexicana Universal pageant. State queens who represented the country in a current or past franchise of the national organization are also highlighted in a specific color.

Current Franchises:

- Competed at Miss Grand International.
- Competed at Miss International.
- Competed at Miss Charm.
- Competed at Reina Hispanoamericana.
- Competed at Miss Orb International.
- Competed at Nuestra Latinoamericana Universal.

Former Franchises:

- Competed at Miss Universe.
- Competed at Miss World.
- Competed at Miss Continente Americano.
- Competed at Miss Costa Maya International.
- Competed at Miss Atlántico Internacional.
- Competed at Miss Verano Viña del Mar.
- Competed at Reina Internacional del Café.
- Competed at Reina Internacional de las Flores.
- Competed at Señorita Continente Americano.
- Competed at Nuestra Belleza Internacional.

Year	Titleholder	Hometown	Placement	Special Award	Notes
2025	Ana Raquel Sánchez Peralta (Resigned)	Villahermosa	Did not Compete		
2025	Paola Guadalupe Ligonio Gamas	Villahermosa	Top 12	Multimedia Award	Competed at Mexicana Universal 2022; Mexicana Universal Tabasco 2021
2024	In 2024, due to changes in the dates of the national pageant, the election of the state queens was postponed for one year.				
2023	Diana Paola Martínez Córdova; Withdrew from the national competition due to the postponement of the national pageant.	Comalcalco	Did not Compete	-	-
2022	Bárbara Paola Aranguren Rosique	Cárdenas	Top 16	-	Flor Tabasco 2017; Embajadora Cárdenas 2017
2021	Paola Guadalupe Ligonio Gamas	Villahermosa	-	-	Top 12 at Mexicana Universal 2026; Mexicana Universal Tabasco 2025
2020	In 2020, due to the contingency of COVID-19 there was a lag in the year of the state contest				
2019	Thania de la Fuente Córdova	Comalcalco	-	-	2nd Runner-up at Mexicana Universal Tabasco 2017
2018	Raquel Guadalupe Romero Hernández	Comalcalco	Top 20	-	1st Runner-up at Mexicana Universal Tabasco 2017; Competed at Nuestra Belleza Tabasco 2016
2017	Aranza Anaid Molina Rueda	Macuspana	1st Runner-up	-	1st Runner-up at Miss Universe México 2024; Miss Universe Tabasco 2024; 1st Runner-up at Reina Hispanoamericana 2018; Mexicana Hispanoamericana 2018
Until 2016 the Title was Nuestra Belleza Tabasco
2016	Itzel Semina Torruco Flores	Villahermosa	-	-	-
2015	Tania Kirey Pérez Quevedo	Nacajuca	Top 15	-	Rosa Ethel Pérez's sister, Nuestra Belleza Tabasco 2013
2014	María José Taboada Rodríguez	Emiliano Zapata	-	-	Top 8 at Flor Tabasco 2013; Embajadora Emiliano Zapata 2013
2013	Rosa Ethel Pérez Quevedo	Nacajuca	Top 10	-	Competed at Miss F1 México 2015; Competed at Nuestra Belleza Tabasco 2012; Tania Pérez's sister, Nuestra Belleza Tabasco 2015
2012	María Alejandra García Izquierdo	Villahermosa	-	-	Competed at Miss F1 México 2015; Competed at Nuestra Belleza Tabasco 2010
2011	Martha del Rocío Espinosa Ríos	Villahermosa	-	-	-
2010	Ana Lilia Lucamendi González	Villahermosa	-	-	-
2009	No candidate was sent				
2008	Priscila Martínez Andrade	Villahermosa	Top 15	-	-
2007	No candidate was sent				
2006	No candidate was sent				
2005	No candidate was sent				
2004	No candidate was sent				
2003	No candidate was sent				
2002	Ana Karina Álvarez May	Macuspana	Top 12	-	-
2001	Alejandra Priego Canto	Villahermosa	-	-	-
2000	Elsa Villanueva González	Tenosique	-	-	-
1999	Ana Marina Valenzuela Riveroll	Comalcalco	-	-	Top 5 at Flor Tabasco 1999; Embajadora Comalcalco 1999
1998	Edith López Vidaurri	Villahermosa	1st Runner-up	-	-
1997	Karla Alejandra Corral Salomón	Tenosique	4th Runner-up	-	Competed at Reinado Internacional del Café 1998; Reina del Café México 1998; Flor Tabasco 1994; Embajadora Tenosique 1994
1996	Alejandra Rodríguez Bustamante	Villahermosa	-	-	-
1995	Martha Alejandra Bolio Sarricolea	Villahermosa	-	-	-
1994	Alma Cecilia Martínez Pérez	Villahermosa	Top 16	-	-

== See also ==
- Miss Tabasco
