= Nuestra Belleza Chiapas 2012 =

- Date: July 26, 2012
- Venue: Tuxtla Gutiérrez, Chiapas
- Broadcaster: Televisa
- Entrants: 6
- Placements: 3
- Winner: Karla Franyutti; Las Rosas

Nuestra Belleza Chiapas 2012 was held in Tuxtla Gutiérrez, Chiapas, on July 26, 2012. At the conclusion of the final night of competition, Karla Franyutti of Las Rosas was crowned the winner by outgoing Nuestra Belleza Chiapas titleholder Krystell Padilla. Six contestants competed for the crown.

== Results ==
=== Placements ===
Final results	Contestant
Nuestra Belleza Chiapas 2012	Karla Fernanda Ruíz Franyutti
Nuestra Belleza Turismo Chiapas 2012	Valeria Ruíz López
1st Runner-up	Helena Armendáriz Bustillo

== Background music ==
- Trovarocker
- Juan Solo

== Contestants ==
Hometown	Contestant	Age	Height (cm)
Arriaga	Valeria Ruíz López	20	178
Cintalapa	Ana Luisa Aguirre	18	169
Huixtla	Helena Arméndariz Bustillo	21	173
Las Rosas	Karla Fernanda Ruíz Franyutti	21	177
Tapilula	Cristel Ramírez Vázquez	22	172
Tuxtla Gutiérrez	Ana Karen Jímenez Constantino	18	174

=== Notes ===
These contestants withdrew from the contest for unknown reasons:

Hometown	Contestant	Age	Height
Tuxtla Gutierrez	María Cristina Domínguez Alatorre	18	182
Jiquipilas, Chiapas	Briseyda Selvas Bonífaz	22	171
Palenque, Chiapas	Cristian Rosette	22	168
