= Nuestra Belleza México 1996 =

3rd edition of Nuestra Belleza México beauty pageant

- Date: September 22, 1996
- Presenters: Raúl Velasco
- Entertainment: Raúl di Blasio, Alejandra Guzmán, Emmanuel, Chayanne
- Venue: Centro de Convenciones, Cancún, Quintana Roo, Mexico
- Broadcaster: Televisa
- Entrants: 32
- Placements: 16
- Winner: Rebeca Tamez; Tamaulipas

Nuestra Belleza México 1996, the 3rd Nuestra Belleza México pageant, was held at the Centro de Convenciones of Cancún, Quintana Roo, Mexico on September 22, 1996. Thirty-two contestants of the Mexican Republic competed for the national title, which was won by Rebeca Tamez from Tamaulipas, who later competed at Miss Universe 1997 in the US. Tamez was crowned by outgoing Nuestra Belleza México titleholder Vanessa Guzmán and Miss Universe 1996 Alicia Machado from Venezuela. She was the first Tamaulipeca and winner of foreign descent (her mother is an American) to win this title.

The Nuestra Belleza Mundo México title was won by Yessica Salazar from Jalisco, who later competed at Miss World 1996 in India where she was a Semi-finalist in the Top 10. Salazar was crowned by outgoing Nuestra Belleza Mundo México titleholder Alejandra Quintero. She is the first and only Jalisciense to win this title.

For the first time, two events were held separately to select the two winners for the titles Nuestra Belleza México and Nuestra Belleza Mundo México.

== Results ==
=== Nuestra Belleza México ===
Final results	Contestant
Nuestra Belleza México 1996	Tamaulipas – Rebeca Tamez
Suplente/1st Runner-up	Veracruz – Ileana Fomperosa
2nd Runner-up	(Chihuahua (state)) Chihuahua – Banelly Carrasco
3rd Runner-up	(Mexico City) Distrito Federal – Ivette Benavides
4th Runner-up	Querétaro – Iveth García
5th Runner-up	Sinaloa – Celia Chávez
Top 16	Chiapas – Melina Cautiño; Durango – Brenda Alcantar; Jalisco – Yessica Salazar; Nayarit – Tania Vázquez; Nuevo León – Blanca Martínez; Oaxaca – Karina Román; Quintana Roo – Ana Ivette Zelaya; Sonora – Mirna Miranda; Yucatán – Lyndia Quiroz; Zacatecas – Sonia García

=== Nuestra Belleza Mundo México ===
One week before the Final Competition was held, the Preliminary Competition featured a live show entitled "Nuestra Belleza México: Rumbo a Miss Mundo" in they announced that the winner of the Nuestra Belleza Mundo México title was Yessica Salazar from Jalisco, who would go on to represent Mexico at Miss World 1996 and finish as a semi-finalist in the Top 10. All contestants competed in swimsuit and evening gown categories during the contest.

The Nuestra Belleza Mundo México pageant was held at the Xcaret Park in Cancún, Quintana Roo, Mexico and was hosted by Marco Antonio Regil. It was the debut of the "Nuestra Belleza Mundo México" contest in its capacity as an official separate pageant to choose Mexico's representative to Miss World. Although the winner of this event also competed in the Final Competition, she finished only as a semi-finalist.

The musical part was enlivened by the following groups: Manuel Mijares, José Luis Rodríguez "El Puma and Paul Anka.

Final results	Contestant
Nuestra Belleza Mundo México 1996	Jalisco – Yessica Salazar
Suplente/1st Runner-up	Veracruz – Ileana Fomperosa
2nd Runner-up	(Mexico City) Distrito Federal – Ivette Benavides
3rd Runner-up	(Chihuahua (state)) Chihuahua – Banelly Carrasco
4th Runner-up	Querétaro – Iveth García

== Contestants ==
State	Contestant	Age
Aguascalientes	María del Pilar Magallanes Peréz	18
Baja California	Karla Baeza Noriega	18
' Baja California Sur	Guadalupe Castillo Celaya	18
Campeche	Liliana Rendis Buenfil	23
Coahuila	Martha Elena Padilla Galarza	21
Colima	Alma Alicia De la Torre Robledo	20
Chiapas	Melina María Doutiño Glaúner	18
(Chihuahua (state)) Chihuahua	Banelly Carrasco Loya	19
(Mexico City) Distrito Federal	Ivette Benavides Rojas	23
Durango	Brenda Elena Alcantar Díaz	22
(State of Mexico) Estado de México	Maricela del Carmén Fernández Tovar	18
Guanajuato	Liliana De Anda Gómez	21
Guerrero	Nancy Karina Bejar Bernal	21
(Hidalgo (state)) Hidalgo	Isela Erendira Ruíz Castañeda	19
Jalisco	Yessica Salazar González	21
Michoacán	Verónica Martínez Pérez	21
Morelos	Ana Paula Castañares De los Cobos	18
Nayarit	Tania Elizabeth Vázquez Pérez	19
Nuevo León	Blanca Elena Martínez De la Fuente	19
Oaxaca	Karin Román Peillet	18
Puebla	María del Pilar Ariadna Romo Durand	22
Querétaro	Hortensia Iveth García Frias	19
Quintana Roo	Ana Ivette Zelaya Espinoza	20
San Luis Potosí	Gloria De la Garza Hernández	19
Sinaloa	Celia Gloria Chávez Carrasco	23
Sonora	Mirna Irene Miranda Torres	21
Tabasco	Alejandra Rodríguez Bustamantes	19
Tamaulipas	Rebeca Lyn Tamez Jones	20
Tlaxcala	María Luisa Orozco Arechiga	18
Veracruz	Ileana Fomperosa Chavarín	21
Yucatán	Lyndia Quiroz Zavala	19
Zacatecas	Sonia García Ramírez	21

== Judges ==
=== Preliminary competition ===
- Miriam Sommers – Fashion and Designer Coordinator
- Víctor Bucardo – Ponds Brand Director
- Glenda Reyna – Glenda Models Director
- César Évora – Actor
- Sarah Bustani – Fashion Designer
- Óscar Madrazo – Contempo Models Director
- Leticia Calderón – Actress
