= Nuestra Belleza Nuevo León 2011 =

- Date: July 12, 2011
- Presenters: Anagabriela Espinoza, Rene Strickler
- Entertainment: Río Roma, Aarón Díaz, Gustavo Lara
- Venue: Las Lomas Eventos, Monterrey, Nuevo León
- Broadcaster: Televisa
- Entrants: 9
- Placements: 4
- Winner: Ivette García; Monterrey

Nuestra Belleza Nuevo León 2011, was held at Las Lomas Eventos in Monterrey, Nuevo León on July 12, 2011. At the conclusion of the final night of competition Ivette García of Monterrey was crowned the winner. García was crowned by outgoing Nuestra Belleza Nuevo León titleholder and Nuestra Belleza Mundo México 2010 Cynthia de la Vega. Nine contestants competed for the title.

== Results ==
=== Placements ===
Final results	Contestant
Nuestra Belleza Nuevo León 2011	Monterrey -Ivette García
Suplente / 1st Runner-up	San Pedro - Paulina Flores
2nd Runner-up	Guadalupe -Ángela Cantú
3rd Runner-up	Apodaca -Analí García

=== Special awards ===
Award	Contestant
Miss Photogenic	Paulina Flores
Miss Elegance	Cecilia Rodríguez

== Judges ==
- Elsa Burgos - Television Hostess & Miss Costa Maya International 2002
- Arturo Carmona - Actor
- Ana Laura Corral - National Coordinator of Nuestra Belleza México
- Ofelia Correa - Regional Coordinator of Nuestra Belleza México
- Juan José Origel - Journalist

== Background Music ==
- Río Roma - "Al Fín te Encontre", "Me Cambiaste la Vida", "No Lo Beses", "Por Eso Te Amo" & "Fan de La Luna"
- Aarón Díaz - "Tu Tienes la Culpa", "Teresa" & "Mi Religión"
- Gustavo Lara - "No Vuelvas a Pararte Frente a Mí", "Princesa" & "La Sombra de los Angeles"

== Contestants ==
Hometown	Contestant	Age	Height (m)
Apodaca	Analí García Rivera	21	1.73
Guadalupe	Ángela Anahí Cantú Sánchez	23	1.80
Monterrey	Adriana Carolina López López	18	1.73
Monterrey	Ana Silvia García Eligio	21	1.75
Monterrey	Cecilia Rodríguez Martínez	19	1.75
Monterrey	Ivette Alejandra García de Hoyos	22	1.74
San Nicolás	Leyla Berenice Silva Saavedra	20	1.74
San Pedro	Paulina Flores Cantú	20	1.70
Santiago	Celina Nallely Martínez González	19	1.75
