= Nuestra Belleza México 2013 =

20th edition of Nuestra Belleza México beauty pageant

- Date: October 19, 2013
- Presenters: Marisol González, René Strickler
- Entertainment: Álex Ubago, Pepe Aguilar
- Venue: Presidential Hangar, Aeropuerto Internacional "Lic. Adolfo López Mateos", Toluca, Estado de México, Mexico
- Broadcaster: Televisa
- Entrants: 33
- Placements: 15
- Withdrawals: Quintana Roo, Zacatecas
- Returns: Campeche
- Winner: Josselyn Garciglia; Baja California Sur

Nuestra Belleza México 2013, the 20th annual Nuestra Belleza México beauty pageant, was held at the Presidential Hangar of Aeropuerto Internacional "Lic. Adolfo López Mateos" in Toluca, Estado de México, Mexico on October 19, 2013. Thirty-three contestants from the Mexican Republic competed for the national title, which was won by Josselyn Garciglia from Baja California Sur, who later competed in Miss Universe 2014 in the United States. Garciglia was crowned by the outgoing Nuestra Belleza México titleholder, Cynthia Duque. She is the first Sudcaliforniana to win this title.

The Nuestra Belleza Mundo México title was won by Daniela Álvarez from Morelos, who later competed in Miss World 2014 in the United Kingdom where she was a semifinalist in the Top 10. Álvarez was crowned by outgoing Nuestra Belleza Mundo México titleholder Marilyn Chagoya. She is the second Morelense to win this title.

Vianey Vázquez from Aguascalientes was designated by the Nuestra Belleza México Organization as Nuestra Belleza Internacional México 2014. She later competed in Miss International 2014 in Japan, where she was a Semifinalist in the Top 10. She is the second Hidrocálida to win this Title.

For the second consecutive time and for the sixth time in the history of the pageant, two events were held separately to select the two winners for the titles Nuestra Belleza México and Nuestra Belleza Mundo México.

The recognition "Corona al Mérito 2013" was for Marisol González, Nuestra Belleza México 2002, actress and TV hostess.

== Results ==
=== Placements ===
Placement	Contestant
Nuestra Belleza México 2013	Baja California Sur – Josselyn Garciglia
1st Runner-Up	Sonora – Vanessa López
2nd Runner-Up	Aguascalientes – Vianey Vázquez
3rd Runner-Up	Jalisco – Nereyda Sánchez
4th Runner-Up	Chihuahua – Ana Lucía Baduy
Top 10	Distrito Federal – Paulina García; Estado de México – Jeannine Saad; Nuevo León – Vanesa Montemayor; Tabasco – Rosa Ethel Pérez; Veracruz – Estefanía Cobos
Top 15	Coahuila – Elisa Villarreal; Durango – Paulina Herrera; Querétaro – Korina Salinas; Tamaulipas – Bárbara Falcón; Yucatán – Maritza Heredia

=== Nuestra Belleza Mundo México ===
Two days before to the final competition was held, the semifinal competition featured a live show entitled "Nuestra Belleza Mundo Mexico" in which it was announced that the winner of the Nuestra Belleza Mundo México title was Daniela Álvarez from Morelos, who would go on to represent Mexico in Miss World 2014. All contestants competed in swimsuit and evening gown categories during the contest.

The Nuestra Belleza Mundo México pageant was held at the Presidential Hangar of Aeropuerto Internacional "Lic. Adolfo López Mateos" of Toluca, Estado de México, Mexico on October 17, 2013 and was hosted by Karla Gómez and Jan. It was the 6th edition of the "Nuestra Belleza Mundo México" contest and as an official separate pageant to choose Mexico's representative to Miss World. The winner of this event did not compete in the final night competition.

Placement	Contestant
Nuestra Belleza Mundo México 2013	Morelos – Daniela Álvarez
1st Runner-Up	Sonora – Vanessa López
Top 5	Baja California Sur – Josselyn Garciglia; Nuevo León – Vanesa Montemayor; Querétaro – Korina Salinas

== National costume competition ==
In this competition, costumes are evaluated instead of the contestants. It is a competition showing the country's wealth embodied in the colorful and fascinating costumes made by Mexican designers combining the past and present of Mexico.

For the Nuestra Belleza México Organization, this event is important because it discloses the creative work of the Mexican designers and also selects the costume to represent Mexico in Miss Universe the next year. In addition, some costumes are elected to represent Mexico in other beauty contests.

The winning costume designer received the "Aguja Diamante Award."

Final results	Contestant
Winner	Jalisco - "Quetzalcóatl"
Top 5	Baja California - "México Lindo"; Colima - "Serpiente de Luz, Equinocio de Primavera"; Oaxaca - "Sandunga, Sangre Tehuana"; Veracruz - "Diosa Quetzalcóatl"

- Aguascalientes - "Serenata Mexicana"
- Baja California - "México Lindo"
- Campeche - "Fiesta de Sarao Campechano" (Competed in Miss International 2013)
- Colima - "Serpiente de Luz, Equinocio de Primavera" (Competed in Reina Hispanoamericana 2013)
- Colima - "Galereña"
- Colima - "Comerciante Indígena, Mujer de Lucha"
- Durango - "Talavera Mexicana" (Competed in Best Model of the World 2013)
- Jalisco - "Bella Flor de Maíz"
- Jalisco - "Quetzalcóatl" (Competed in Miss Universe 2014)
- Oaxaca - "Sandunga, Sangre Tehuana" (Competed in Miss Earth 2013)
- Oaxaca - "Raíces Malacateras"
- Oaxaca - "Alebrije Oaxaqueño"
- Sinaloa - "Mucume"
- Sinaloa - "Zandunguera"
- Tabasco - "Paraíso Lindo"
- Veracruz - "Jarocha"
- Veracruz - "Achuykaak, Diosa de la Guerra"
- Veracruz - "Diosa Quetzalcóatl"
- Yucatán - "Victoria, Novia de Filigrana y Oro"

=== Special awards ===
Award	Contestant
Miss Top Model	Jalisco - Nereyda Sánchez
Contestants' Choice	Tamaulipas - Bárbara Falcón
Miss Talent	Morelos - Daniela Álvarez
Miss Sports	Yucatán - Maritza Heredia
Academic Award	Querétaro - Korina Salinas
Personality Fraiche	Baja California Sur - Josselyn Garciglia
Steps to Fame	Aguascalientes - Vianey Vázquez

== Judges ==
They were the same judges at the Preliminary and Final Competition.

- Nicandro Díaz González - TV Producer
- Juan Osorio - TV Producer
- Sergio Mayer - Actor
- Diego Di Marco - TV Host and Health Coach
- Dr. Ángel Carranza - Plastic Surgeon
- Silvia Galván - Image Designer
- Anagabriela Espinoza - Miss International 2009 and TV Hostess
- Carolina Morán - Nuestra Belleza Mundo México 2006 and TV Hostess
- Dafne Molina - Nuestra Belleza Mundo México 2004 and TV Hostess

== Contestants ==
State	Contestant	Age	Height (m)	Hometown
Aguascalientes	Vianey del Rosario Vázquez Ramírez	19	1.78	Aguascalientes
Baja California	Ana Paulina Assemat Romero	19	1.71	Tijuana
Baja California Sur	Josselyn Azeneth Garciglia Bañuelos	23	1.74	La Paz
Campeche	Silvia Minerva García Cruz	19	1.76	Ciudad del Carmen
Chiapas	Karla Jazmín Tovar Escobar	23	1.73	Palenque
(Chihuahua (state)) Chihuahua	Ana Lucia Baduy Valles	22	1.77	Chihuahua
Coahuila	Elisa María Villarreal Hernández	21	1.83	Castaños
Colima	Karen Estefanía Arceo Gallegos	22	1.70	Colima
(Mexico City) Distrito Federal	Paulina García Robles	20	1.73	Mexico City
Durango	Paulina Herrera Fallad	21	1.72	Durango
(State of Mexico) Estado de México	Jeannine Laurette Saad Meraz	19	1.71	Metepec
Guanajuato	Giovana Vázquez Fuentes	21	1.78	Moroleón
Guerrero	Bárbara Mariel Pozos Morales	20	1.76	Acapulco
(Hidalgo (state)) Hidalgo	Shantal Montaño Ricaño	23	1.68	Tulancingo
Jalisco	Paola Nereyda Sánchez Corona	21	1.78	Guadalajara
Jalisco	Rocío Hernández Zamudio	19	1.72	San Ignacio Cerro Gordo
Michoacán	Británia Lizbeth Méndez Castellanos	22	1.81	Apatzingán
Morelos	Daniela Álvarez Reyes	19	1.74	Cuernavaca
Nayarit	Yessica Orozco Huitrón	22	1.78	Tepic
Nuevo León	Vanesa Montemayor Cortéz	20	1.75	Monterrey
Oaxaca	Yamilé Guerrero Hernández	20	1.68	Loma Bonita
Puebla	Katyna Sánchez De Cima De Crescenzo	20	1.68	Puebla
Querétaro	Carla Korina Salinas Orban	21	1.75	Querétaro
San Luis Potosí	Alejandra Wallen Flores	21	1.72	San Luis Potosí
Sinaloa	Irma Cecilia Padilla Soto	23	1.75	Culiacán
Sonora	Vanessa López Quijada	18	1.73	Nogales
Sonora	Clarisa Lucía Sandoval Valenzuela	20	1.77	Navojoa
Tabasco	Rosa Ethel Pérez Quevedo	23	1.77	Villahermosa
Tamaulipas	Bárbara Giovanni Falcón Prieto	23	1.75	Nuevo Laredo
Tlaxcala	Nydia Galindo Salas	22	1.81	Apizaco
Veracruz	Blanca Lidia Lima Quiroz	22	1.72	Poza Rica
Veracruz	Luz Estefanía Cobos Rivera	22	1.82	Poza Rica
Yucatán	Maritza Heredia Torre	23	1.71	Mérida

== Notes ==
=== Designates ===
- Jalisco - Rocío Hernández
- Sonora - Clarisa Sandoval
- Veracruz - Estefanía Cobos

=== Returning states ===
- Campeche

=== Withdrawals ===
- Zacatecas - Alejandra Sandoval withdrew from the competition due to appendix surgery days before the national concentration. Her Suplente/1 st Runner-up Estefany Camargo declined to participate in the national final for reasons unknown. So, the State of Zacatecas had no representative in this edition.
