= Nuestra Belleza Sinaloa 2012 =

- Date: June 22, 2012
- Venue: Modular Inés Arredondo, Culiacán, Sinaloa
- Broadcaster: Televisa
- Entrants: 8
- Placements: 4
- Winner: Karime Macías; Mazatlán

Nuestra Belleza Sinaloa 2012, was held at the Modular Inés Arredondo of Culiacán, Sinaloa on June 22, 2012. At the conclusion of the final night of competition, Karime Macías from Mazatlán was crowned the winner. Macías was crowned by outgoing Nuestra Belleza Sinaloa titleholder, Grecia Gutiérrez. Eight contestants competed for the title.

One of the contestants, María Susana Flores Gámez, 20, was killed in a shoot-out confrontation between a gang of Mexican drug traffickers and Mexican soldiers. She emerged first with a gun, from the traffickers' vehicle, and was killed in a hail of gunfire. It was first suggested that she was likely used as a human shield but later tests revealed she had gunpowder residue on her hands suggesting she may have fired the weapon. Investigators are unsure as to whether Gámez was a willing participant in the shootout and fired on Mexican troops or whether she was being used as a human shield.

== Results ==
=== Placements ===
Final results	Contestant
Nuestra Belleza Sinaloa 2012	Karime Macías
Supente / 1st Runner-up	Briseyda Zazueta
2nd Runner-up	Patricia de la Vega
3rd Runner-up	Carolina Camacho

== Special awards ==
Final results	Contestant
Miss Photogenic	Briseyda Zazueta
Miss Congeniality	Lilibeth Angulo
Miss Elegance	Daniela Aguilar
Best Hair	Karime Macías
Best Skin	Lilibeth Angulo

== Contestants ==
Hometown	Contestant	Age	Height (m)
Culiacán	Daniela Aguilar Bringas	22	1.74
Culiacán	Briseyda Zazueta López	23	1.72
Culiacán	Iris Carolina Camacho Gastélum	22	1.75
Culiacán	María Susana Flores Gámez	20	1.70
Culiacán	Patricia de la Vega Zazueta	19	1.77
Mazatlán	Karime Macías Olson	23	1.72
Mazatlán	Lilibeth Angulo Gaytán	20	1.76
Mazatlán	Thelma Sánchez Navarro	23	1.71
