= Nuestra Belleza Nuevo León 2012 =

- Date: July 11, 2012
- Presenters: Mane de la Parra, Daniela Plancarte
- Entertainment: Roke, Ernesto D'Alessio, Circo Pop
- Venue: Las Lomas Eventos, Monterrey, Nuevo León
- Broadcaster: Televisa
- Entrants: 8
- Placements: 4
- Winner: Cynthia Duque; Monterrey

Nuestra Belleza Nuevo León 2012, was held at Las Lomas Eventos in Monterrey, Nuevo León on July 11, 2012. At the conclusion of the final night of competition Cynthia Duque from Monterrey was crowned the winner. Duque was crowned by outgoing Nuestra Belleza Nuevo León titleholder Ivette García. Eight contestants competed for the title.

== Results ==
=== Placements ===
Final results	Contestant
Nuestra Belleza Nuevo León 2012	Monterrey -Cynthia Duque
Suplente / 1st Runner-up	Guadalupe -Lucero Montemayor
2nd Runner-up	San Pedro -Alejandra Delgadillo
3rd Runner-up	Monterrey -Jahaira López

=== Special awards ===
Award	Contestant
Miss Photogenic	Lucero Montemayor
Miss Elegance	Cynthia Duque
Miss Sports	Lucero Montemayor

== Judges ==
- Vero Solís - Fashion Designer
- Anagabriela Espinoza - Miss International 2009 & TV Hostess
- Perla Beltrán - Nuestra Belleza Mundo México 2008
- Nora Salinas - Actress
- Ana Laura Corral - National Coordinator of Nuestra Belleza México
- Arturo Carmona - Actor
- Jaime Campos - Photographer

== Background Music ==
- Roke
- Ernesto D'Alessio
- Circo Pop

== Contestants ==
Hometown	Contestant	Age	Height (m)
Apodaca	Alejandra Guissete López Vaquera	18	1.72
Guadalupe	Evelyn Elvia Nelly Castro Martínez	21	1.71
Guadalupe	Lucero Miroslava Montemayor Gracia	22	1.75
Monterrey	Alejandra Villarreal González	22	1.75
Monterrey	Cynthia Lizetthe Duque Garza	19	1.76
Monterrey	Jahaira Ana Alejandra López Villegas	20	1.71
Monterrey	Susan Arisaí Rey Hernández	20	1.70
San Pedro	Alejandra Delgadillo Salazar	20	1.82
