= Mexicana Universal Chiapas =

- Formation: 1994 (as Nuestra Belleza Chiapas); 2017 (as Mexicana Universal Chiapas)
- Type: Beauty pageant
- Headquarters: Tuxtla Gutiérrez
- Location: Mexico
- Local Coordinator: Rosa Ethel Pérez

Mexicana Universal Chiapas (until 2016 called Nuestra Belleza Chiapas) is a state-level contest in the state of Chiapas, Mexico, which selects the state representative for the national contest Mexicana Universal (formerly called Nuestra Belleza México), thus aspiring to represent the country internationally on one of the platforms offered.

The state organization has achieved the following results since 1994:

- 5th Runner-up: 1 (2018
- Top 10: 3 (2007, 2008, 2009)
- Top 15/16: 4 (1996, 2011, 2012, 2014)
- Unplaced: 18 (1994, 1995, 1997, 1998, 1999, 2000, 2001, 2002, 2006, 2009, 2010, 2013, 2016, 2017, 2019, 2021, 2023, 2025)
- Absences: 5 (2003, 2004, 2005, 2015, 2022)

== National Queens ==
- Gmelina Coutiño - Miss Atlántico México 2000 (Designated)

== Titleholders ==
The following are the names of the annual winners of Mexicana Universal Chiapas, listed in ascending order, as well as their results during the national Mexicana Universal pageant. State queens who represented the country in a current or past franchise of the national organization are also highlighted in a specific color.

Current Franchises:

- Competed at Miss Grand International.
- Competed at Miss International.
- Competed at Miss Charm.
- Competed at Reina Hispanoamericana.
- Competed at Miss Orb International.
- Competed at Nuestra Latinoamericana Universal.

Former Franchises:

- Competed at Miss Universe.
- Competed at Miss World.
- Competed at Miss Continente Americano.
- Competed at Miss Costa Maya International.
- Competed at Miss Atlántico Internacional.
- Competed at Miss Verano Viña del Mar.
- Competed at Reina Internacional del Café.
- Competed at Reina Internacional de las Flores.
- Competed at Señorita Continente Americano.
- Competed at Nuestra Belleza Internacional.

Year	Titleholder	Hometown	Placement	Special Award	Notes
2025	Montserrat Alely Toalá Grajales	Suchiapa	-	-	Competed at Miss Teenager México 2022; Miss Teenager Chiapas 2022; Miss Teen H2O Chiapas 2022; Reina de Reinas de Cristal Chiapas 2021
2024	In 2024, due to changes in the dates of the national pageant, the election of the state queens was postponed for this year.				
2023	Alicia Archila Molina	Tuxtla Gutiérrez	-	-	-
2022	No candidate was sent				
2021	Brenda Berenice Zuarth Aragón	Tuxtla Gutiérrez	-	-	Miss Panamerican México 2019; Top 8 at Miss Earth México 2019; Miss Earth Chiapas 2019
2020	In 2020, due to the contingency of COVID-19 there was a lag in the year of the state contest				
2019	Paulina Ruiz Hernández	Tuxtla Gutiérrez	-	-	-
2018	Ximena Torres Ochoa	Tuxtla Gutiérrez	5th Runner-up	Miss Digital	4th Runner-up at Miss Universe México 2026; Miss Universe Ciudad de México 2026; Top 6 at Miss Mesoamérica México 2018; Miss Mesoamérica Chiapas 2018
2017	Deborah Ozuna Rivera	Tuxtla Gutiérrez	-	-	Miss Freedom México 2017; Reina de la Feria Chiapas 2017; Top 8 at Miss Earth México 2015; Miss Earth Chiapas 2015; Señorita UVM 2013
Until 2016 the Title was Nuestra Belleza Chiapas
2016	Andrea Celeste Zenteno Vázquez	Tonalá	-	-	Top 15 at Miss Globe 2015; Miss Globe México 2015; Miss Heritage North America 2014; Top 10 at Miss Heritage 2014; Miss Heritage México 2014; Miss Earth México-Air 2014; Miss Earth Chiapas 2014
2015	No candidate was sent				
2014	María Fernanda Córdova Carrillo	Tapachula	Top 15	-	Competed at Miss F1 México 2015; Reina de la Feria Tapachula 2008
2013	Karla Jazmín Tovar Escobar	Palenque	-	-	Competed at Nuestra Belleza Chiapas 2011
2012	Karla Fernanda Ruíz Franyutti	Las Rosas	Did not Compete	-	-
2011	Krystell Padilla Sáyago	Tonalá	Top 15	-	-
2010	Adriana Grissel Hernández Cáceres	Tecpatán	-	-	Competed at Miss All Nations 2012; Miss All Nations México 2012
2009	Claudia Espinosa Gómez	Catazajá	Top 10	-	Competed at Miss Tourism International 2011; Miss Tourism International México 2011; 4th Runner-up at World Miss University 2008; World Miss University México 2008
2008	Marliese Edelmann Ayala	Tapachula	Top 10	-	Top 10 at Miss Fox Sports 2010; 2nd Runner-up at Miss Costa Maya International 2009; Miss Costa Maya México 2009; First Mexican-german born in Chiapas
2007	Natalia Ruiz Álvarez	Tuxtla Gutiérrez	Top 10	-	Competed at Miss Costa Maya International 2008; Miss Costa Maya México 2008
2006	Dalia Lazcano Córdoba	Comitán	-	-	Reina de Comitán 2004
2005	No candidate was sent				
2004	No candidate was sent				
2003	No candidate was sent				
2002	Fanny Sesma Melgar	Tapachula	-	-	-
2001	Alejandra Paulina Zenteno Chacón	Tuxtla Gutiérrez	-	-	-
2000	Ileana Ruiz Amaya	Tuxtla Gutiérrez	-	-	-
1999	Mabell Ortiz Gómez	Tuxtla Gutiérrez	-	-	-
1998	Nubia Benicia León Montoya	Tuxtla Gutiérrez	-	-	-
1997	María Elena Pérez Peña	Tapachula	-	-	-
1996	Gmelina Coutiño Glauner	Tapachula	Top 16	-	Competed at Miss Atlántico Internacional 2000; Miss Atlántico México 2000; Miss Young Caribbean & American 1994; Miss Young México 1994
1995	Laura Rita Espinosa Moreno	Tuxtla Gutiérrez	-	-	-
1994	Michelle Ordoñez Flores	Tuxtla Gutiérrez	-	-	-

== Designated Contestants ==
Starting in 2000, states were allowed to have more than one candidate, as some states were not sending candidates for various reasons. The following contestants from Chiapas were invited to compete in the national pageant alongside the reigning queen, and in some cases, they achieved even better results.

Year	Titleholder	Hometown	Placement	Special Award	Notes
2012	Valeria Ruiz López	Arriaga	Top 15	-	Nuestra Belleza Turismo Chiapas 2012; 1st Runner-up at Nuestra Belleza Chiapas 2010
2009	Mildreth Jiménez León	Cintalapa	-	-	Rostro de Chiapas 2018; 1st Runner-up at Nuestra Belleza Chiapas 2009

== See also ==
- Miss Chiapas
