= Silvia Salgado =

Silvia Salgado may refer to:

- Silvia Salgado (model)
- Silvia Salgado (politician)
