= Polyforum Chiapas =

Indoor arena in Tuxtla Gutiérrez, Mexico

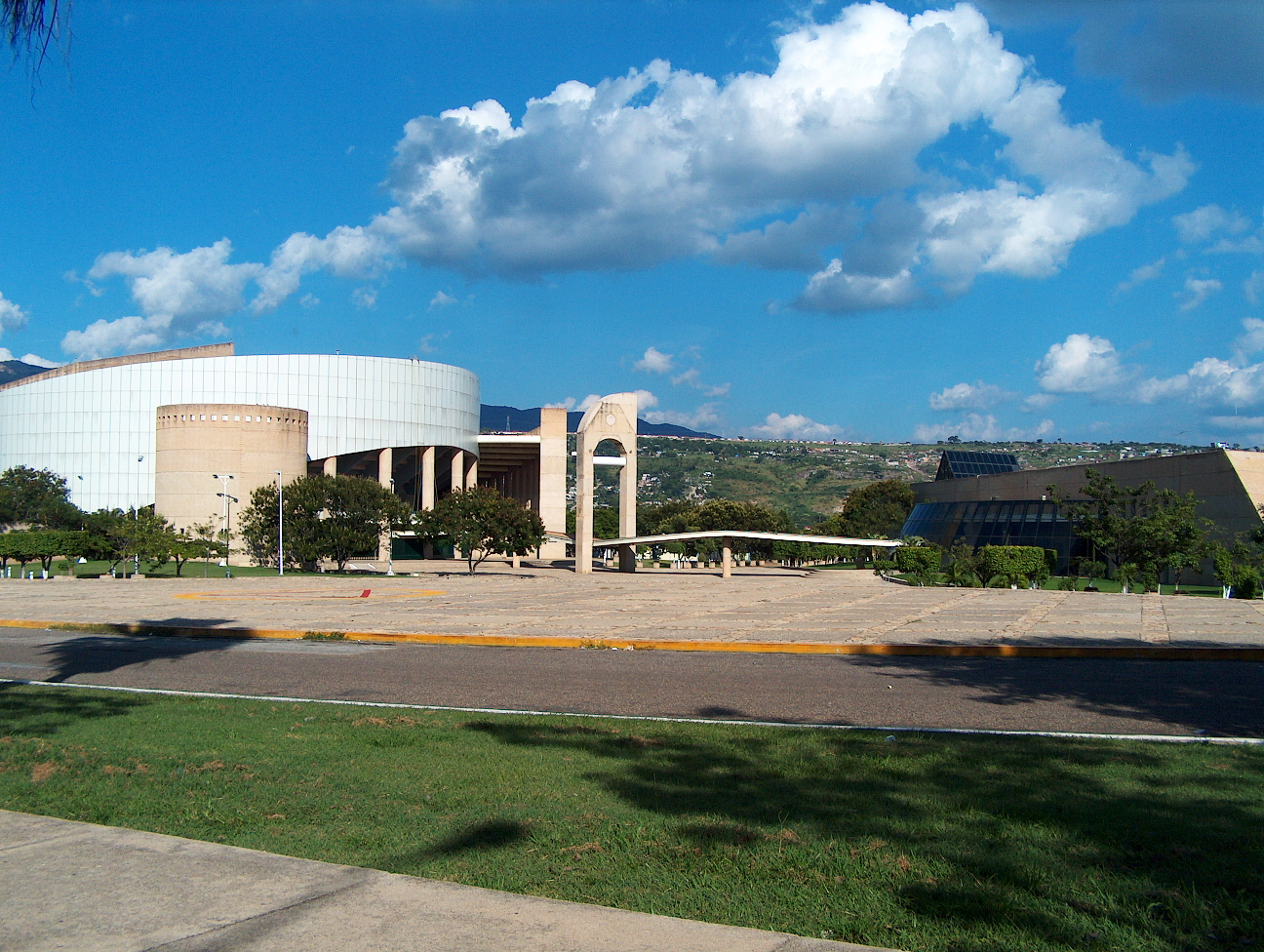
Main entrance

The Centro de Convenciones y Polyforum Chiapas, also known as Poliforum Mesoamericano, is a 3,875-seat indoor arena located in Tuxtla Gutiérrez, Mexico. It was built in 1994. It is used for concerts, basketball, lucha libre, conventions and other special events.

The Polyforum contains 41,170 square feet (3,825 m^{2}) of total space. Unlike most arenas built in the 1990s, the Polyforum contains a permanent stage allowing it to also be used for stage shows. Seating is divided between permanent seats on the risers and removable floor seating

The Polyforum is the flagship facility of the Centro de Convenciones Chiapas which also includes two exhibit halls, one measuring 15,123 square feet (1,405.0 m^{2}) of space and a grand hall measuring 11,840 square feet (1,100 m^{2}) of space, for a grand total of 26,964 square feet (2,505.0 m^{2}) of space. There are also three meeting rooms, a 100-seat auditorium, an on-site restaurant, and various high-rise buildings with governmental offices.
