= Miroslava Montemayor =

Mexican beauty pageant winner (born 1990)

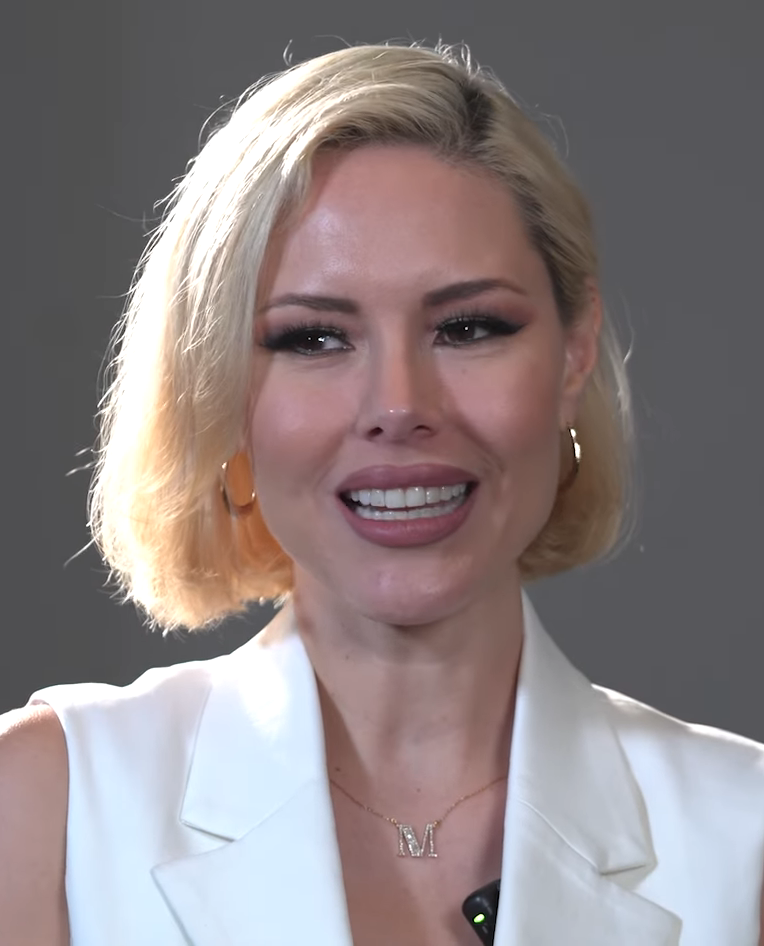
- Montemayor in 2025
- Born: Lucero Miroslava Montemayor Garcia; January 5, 1990 (age 36); Monterrey, Nuevo León, Mexico
- Education: Universidad Autónoma de Nuevo León
- Height: 1.76 m (5 ft 9 1/2 in)
- Title: Señorita UANL 2011; Nuestra Belleza Int'l México 2013
- Spouse: Jorge Adalberto Ortiz (m. 2021)

Lucero Miroslava Montemayor Garcia (born January 5, 1990) is a Mexican beauty pageant titleholder, sportscaster and businesswoman.

Montemayor won Nuestra Belleza Internacional México 2013 title and represented Mexico at Miss International 2013.

== Pageants ==
Lucero Montemayor was Señorita UANL 2011, beauty pageant in her University. She represented her home Químicas as Señorita Químicas 2011. Later at Nuestra Belleza Nuevo León 2012 she was the Suplente/1st Runner-up and was designated to compete with Cynthia Duque winner of Nuestra Belleza Nuevo León 2012 at Nuestra Belleza México 2012 pageant.

At the semifinal competition she was the Suplente/1st Runner-up of Nuestra Belleza Mundo México 2012, title which was won by Marilyn Chagoya from Veracruz. At the final night she was again the Suplente/1st Runner-up of Cynthia Duque who was Nuestra Belleza México 2012 winner.

Months later, she was designated by Nuestra Belleza México Organization as Nuestra Belleza Internacional México 2013. And she represented Mexico at Miss International 2013 in Japan.

== Broadcasting career ==
In 2014 Montemayor started her sportscasting career in Monterrey appearing in TV Azteca Noreste sports show ADN. At TV Azteca Noreste, Montemayor covered the 2015 Pro Bowl and Super Bowl XLIX in Glendale, Arizona, as well as other sporting events. In December 2015, Montemayor left Azteca and joined ESPN to become the presenter of Spanish-language version of NFL Live. Montemayor was also the presenter for ESPN Mexico's afternoon sports talk show Los Capitanes which is anchored by José Ramón Fernández.

Montemayor left NFL Live and Los Capitanes in August 2017 to become an anchor for the Spanish version of SportsCenter. She also hosts a show named Otra Ronda with Adalberto Franco every Thursday, the show airs on ESPN2 in Mexico.

At ESPN Montemayor has covered events such as the Mexican Tennis Open in Acapulco, the Los Cabos Open in Los Cabos, Super Bowl LI in Houston and the 2018 FIFA World Cup in Russia.

On October 4, 2019, Montemayor announced her departure from ESPN.

== Personal life ==
Montemayor is in a relationship with businessman and Club Tijuana President and owner Jorge Alberto Hank (son of Jorge Hank Rhon). On September 14, 2019, Montemayor announced their engagement on Instagram.

Awards and achievements
Preceded by Jessica García Formenti	Nuestra Belleza México; 2013	Succeeded by Vianey Vázquez
