= Nuestra Belleza Jalisco 2010 =

- Date: July 23, 2010
- Presenters: Carlos Anaya, Paola Velazco
- Venue: Auditorio Telmex, Guadalajara, Jalisco
- Broadcaster: Televisa
- Entrants: 12
- Placements: 5
- Winner: Karin Ontiveros

Nuestra Belleza Jalisco 2010, was held at the Auditorio Telmex in Guadalajara, Jalisco on July 23, 2010. At the conclusion of the final night of competition, Karin Ontiveros of Amatitan was crowned the winner. Ontiveros was crowned by outgoing Nuestra Belleza Jalisco 2009 Janeth Perez and Miss Universe 2010, Ximena Navarrete. Twelve contestants competed for the state title. The pageant was hosted by Carlos Anaya y Paola Velazco.

== Results ==
=== Placements ===
Final results	Contestant
Nuestra Belleza Jalisco 2010	Karin Ontiveros
1st Runner-up	María de Jesús Padilla Romo
Finalist	Eunice Guadalupe Sánchez Valencia; Ana Sofía Lanczyner Domínguez; Belinda Coral Flores Tinajero

== Judges ==
- Néstor Daniel - singer
- Sergio Bustamante - celebrity plastic surgeon
- Karla Carrillo - Nuestra Belleza México 2008 and Miss Continente Americano 2010 1st runner-up
- Óscar "El espectáculo" - comedian
- Martha Zavaleta' - television host
- Álvaro Álvarez - model

== Background music ==
- David Guetta
- Carina Ricco
- José Luis Altamirano

== Contestants ==
Hometown	Contestant	Age	Height (m)
Guadalajara	Ana Cristina Dorantes Fernández	23	1.84
Guadalajara	Ana Sofía Lanczyner Domínguez	23	1.76
Puerto Vallarta	Belinda Coral Flores Tinajero	22	1.75
Ciudad Guzman	Brenda Hernández Vázquez	22	1.77
Tepatitlan	Carla Angelli Tapia Rosas	22	1.81
Guadalajara	Eunice Guadalupe Sánchez Valencia	18	1.78
Puerto Vallarta	Eva Janette González Pelayo	20	1.70
Amatitan	Karin Cecilia Ontiveros Meza	22	1.80
Tepatitlan	Lorena Jacqueline de Anda Reynoso	19	1.76
Jalostotitlan	María de Jesús Padilla Romo	19	1.72
Guadalajara	Paula Isela Cárdenas Rodríguez	19	1.71
Guadalajara	Susana Madelin Almeida Medina	19	1.72
