= Miss Earth México 2010 =

- Date: September 17, 2010
- Entertainment: Enrique Maroto
- Venue: Yucatán Siglo XXI Convention Centre, Mérida, Yucatán, Mexico
- Broadcaster: DISH Network L.L.C.
- Entrants: 32
- Placements: 8
- Winner: Claudia Mollinedo; Tabasco

The Miss Earth México 2010, the ninth edition of the pageant, was held at the Yucatán Siglo XXI Convention Centre in Mérida, Yucatán, Mexico on September 17, 2010. Thirty-two delegates competed for the national title, which was won by Claudia Mollinedo from Tabasco. López was crowned by Miss Earth México 2009, Natalia Quiñones from Jalisco.

Miss Earth México 2010 represented the country in the international Miss Earth 2010 pageant which was held in Vinpearl Land, Nha Trang, Vietnam on November 28, 2010.

== Results ==
=== Placements ===
Final results	Delegate
Miss Earth México 2010	Tabasco – Claudia López Mollinedo
Miss Air	Sinaloa – Anahi Ochoa
Miss Water	Baja California Sur – Yaneth Formenti
Miss Fire	Chihuahua – Cristina Hernandez
Top 8	Guanajuato – Yasmin Navarro; Jalisco – Carla Tapia; Yucatán – Laura Álvarez; Zacatecas – Mariana Villanueva
Top 15	Aguascalientes – Sheirell Badillo; Distrito Federal – Irais Flores; Guerrero – Adriana Cuevas; Michoacán – Xóchitl García; Oaxaca – Nancy Brigida; Querétaro – Olga Montemayor; Tlaxcala – Erika Ruíz

=== Special awards ===
Award	Delegate
Miss Photogenic	Zacatecas – Mariana Villanueva
Miss Elegance	Baja California Sur – Yaneth Formenti
Miss Friendship	Oaxaca – Nancy Brigida
Miss Internet	Aguascalientes – Sheirell Badillo
Best in Swimsuit	Sinaloa – Anahi Ochoa
Best Hair	Yucatán – Laura Álvarez
Best Ecological Project	Baja California Sur – Yaneth Formenti

== Delegates ==
State	Contestant	Age	Height
Aguascalientes	Sheirell Mihaili Badillo Avilés	18	1.71
Baja California	Alexandra Íñiguez Guzmán	19	1.74
Baja California Sur	Edna Yaneth García Formentí Polanco	23	1.77
Campeche	Karely Guadalupe Cambranis Acosta	18	1.74
Chiapas	Fanny Georgina Grapain Ruiz	18	1.70
Chihuahua	Cristina Melissa Hernández Guerra	18	1.77
Coahuila	Graciela Esqueda Cardenas	22	1.70
Colima	Carla Paola Pastor Cobadilla	18	1.74
Distrito Federal	Irais Cristina Flores Segura	24	1.78
Durango	Blanca América Peláez Flores	19	1.75
Estado de México	María Rigel Neri González	24	1.70
Guanajuato	Jazmín Anabell Navarro Ezrre	21	1.78
Guerrero	Adriana Cuevas Gallardo	23	1.71
Hidalgo	Claudia Valádez Arriega	22	1.72
Jalisco	Carla Angelli Tapia Rosas	18	1.81
Michoacán	Xóchitl García	24	1.78
Morelos	Carolina Stephany González Linares	24	1.72
Nayarit	Grecia Iliana Arias Mora	23	1.70
Nuevo León	Issamar Cavazos Olivares	18	1.72
Oaxaca	Nancy Brigida Espinoza Angeles	22	1.70
Puebla	Adriana Teigeiro Ríos	22	1.75
Querétaro	Olga Lidia Montemayor Castellanos	24	1.70
Quintana Roo	Joanna Karina López Grajales	21	1.69
San Luis Potosí	Joycelyn Paulina Medina Lozano	24	1.71
Sinaloa	Anahí Ochoa López	20	1.73
Sonora	Netzay Suset Félix Encina	23	1.76
Tabasco	Claudia López Mollinedo	18	1.74
Tamaulipas	Ilianna Erika Quiroz Perales	23	1.76
Tlaxcala	Erika Vanessa Ruiz Moreno	24	1.70
Veracruz	Sbeydy Elisa Reyna Salomón	24	1.71
Yucatán	Laura Elisa Álvarez Damian	21	1.72
Zacatecas	Mariana Villanueva	23	1.71
