= Silvia Salgado (model) =

Mexican beauty pageant contestant (born 1978)

- Born: Silvia Salgado Cavazos; February 9, 1978 (age 48); Monterrey, Nuevo León, Mexico
- Height: 1.75 m (5 ft 9 in)
- Beauty pageant titleholder
- Hair color: Light Brown
- Eye color: Brown
- Major competitions: Nuestra Belleza Nuevo León 1998 (Winner); Nuestra Belleza México 1998 (Winner); Miss Universe 1999 (Top 10)

Silvia Salgado Cavazos (born February 9, 1978) is a Mexican model and beauty pageant titleholder who won the national pageant Nuestra Belleza México and represented her country and placed among the semi-finalists in the 1999 Miss Universe pageant, held in Chaguaramas, Trinidad and Tobago, on May 26, 1999.

Awards and achievements
Preceded by (Nuevo León) Katty Fuentes	Nuestra Belleza México; 1998	Succeeded by (Sonora) Leticia Murray
Preceded by Katty Fuentes	Nuestra Belleza Nuevo León; 1998	Succeeded by Vannessa Valle Yves
