= Katty Fuentes =

Mexican beauty pageant contestant

- Born: Katty Fuentes García; Monterrey, Nuevo León, Mexico
- Height: 1.75 m (5 ft 9 in)
- Beauty pageant titleholder
- Hair color: Black
- Eye color: Green
- Major competitions: Nuestra Belleza Nuevo León 1997 (Winner); Nuestra Belleza México 1997 (Winner); Miss Universe 1998 (Unplaced); Miss Atlantic International 1998 (1st Runner-up)

Katty Fuentes García (born c. 1977) is a Mexican model and beauty pageant titleholder who won the national beauty pageant of Mexico and represented her country in the Miss Universe 1998 pageant, held in Honolulu, Hawaii, U.S. on May 12, 1998. There, she received the Clairol Style Award and the third placement in the National Costume Competition.

Preceded by Rebeca Tamez	Nuestra Belleza México; 1997	Succeeded by Silvia Salgado
