= Nuestra Belleza México 1995 =

2nd edition of Nuestra Belleza México beauty pageant

- Date: October 22, 1995
- Presenters: Raúl Velasco
- Entertainment: Thalía
- Venue: Teatro Morelos, Toluca, Estado de México, Mexico
- Broadcaster: Televisa
- Entrants: 32
- Placements: 16
- Winner: Vanessa Guzmán; Chihuahua

Nuestra Belleza México 1995, the 2nd Nuestra Belleza México beauty pageant, was held at the Teatro Morelos of Toluca, Estado de México, Mexico on October 22, 1995. Thirty-two contestants of the Mexican Republic competed for the national title, which was won by Vanessa Guzmán from Chihuahua, who later competed at Miss Universe 1996 in US where she was finalist in the Top 6. Guzmán was crowned by outgoing Nuestra Belleza México titleholder Luz María Zetina. She is the first blonde and only Chihuahuense to win this title.

The Nuestra Belleza Mundo México title was won by Alejandra Quintero from Nuevo León, who later competed at Miss World 1995 in South Africa where she was a semi-finalist in the Top 10. Quintero was crowned by the outgoing Nuestra Belleza México titleholder, Luz María Zetina. She was the first Neoleonesa to win this title.

This year the Nuestra Belleza México Organization had negotiated the license of the international Miss World contest. The contest Nuestra Belleza México is strengthened by offering their candidates two options for participating in the events of greater global significance: Miss Universe and Miss World. This year, Lupita Jones won the Miss World franchise and the right to send representatives to this event.

== Results ==
=== Placements ===
Final results	Contestant
Nuestra Belleza México 1995	(Chihuahua (state)) Chihuahua – Vanessa Guzmán
Nuestra Belleza Mundo México 1995	Nuevo León – Alejandra Quintero
Suplente/1st Runner-up	Sonora – Lourdes Portela
2nd Runner-up	Nayarit – Consuelo Rodríguez
3rd Runner-up	Tlaxcala – Lourdes Sánchez
4th Runner-up	Guerrero – Karla González
Top 16	Aguascalientes – Leticia Soria; Baja California – Alma Ballesteros; Colima – Martha Pérez; (Mexico City) Distrito Federal – Adriana Fregoso; Guanajuato – María Eva Curiel; Jalisco – Tania Prado; Querétaro – Cytlalhi Galindo; San Luis Potosí – Katya Michel; Sinaloa – Dalina De la Peña; Veracruz – Socorro Retolaza

=== Preliminary competition ===
The Preliminary Competition was held at the Teatro Morelos of Toluca, Estado de México, Mexico on October 21, 1995. Prior to the final telecast, all contestants competed in swimsuit and evening gown categories during the preliminary competition, which included a National Costume competition. The opening number was a parade in state costume.

The Preliminary Competition was hosted by Raúl Velasco.

=== Placements ===
Final results	Contestant
Miss Dorian Grey 1995	San Luis Potosí – Katya Michel
Suplente/1st Runner-up	(Chihuahua (state)) Chihuahua – Vanessa Guzmán
Top 10	(Mexico City) Distrito Federal – Adriana Fregoso; Jalisco – Tania Prado; Nayarit – Consuelo Rodríguez; Nuevo León – Alejandra Quintero; Puebla – Emireth López; Sonora – Lourdes Portela; Tlaxcala – Lourdes Sánchez; Veracruz – Socorro Retolaza

== Contestants ==
State	Contestant	Age
Aguascalientes	Leticia Soria Mereles	19
Baja California	Alma Alicia Ballesteros Robles	18
Baja California Sur	Clementina Ceceña Mascareño	20
Campeche	Eddy Esther Magaña Domínguez	20
Coahuila	Vanessa Guerrero Martínez	19
Colima	Martha Peréz Rodríguez	18
Chiapas	Laura Rita Espinoza Moreno	18
(Chihuahua (state)) Chihuahua	Vanessa Guzmán Niebla	19
(Mexico City) Distrito Federal	Adriana Fregoso Martínez	20
Durango	Esther Ileana Arreola López	21
(State of Mexico) Estado de México	María Guadalupe Flores	20
Guanajuato	María Eva Curiel Padilla	20
Guerrero	Karla Patricia González López	18
(Hidalgo (state)) Hidalgo	Lizbeth Ileana Hernández Orta	19
Jalisco	Tania Prado Laursen	18
Michoacán	Erika Martínez Cárdenas	21
Morelos	Ruth Sarquit Valenzuela	20
Nayarit	María Consuelo Rodríguez Tarabay	24
Nuevo León	Alejandra Aidee Quintero Velasco	19
Oaxaca	Valeria Victorino Mungaray	20
Puebla	Emireth López Pulido	18
Querétaro	Cytlalhi Galindo Goméz	22
Quintana Roo	Natalia Genoveva Sánchez	18
San Luis Potosí	Katya Michel De la Torre	19
' Sinaloa	Dalina De la Peña Montoya	18
Sonora	Lourdes Guadalupe Portela Peñuñuri	22
Tabasco	Martha Alejandra Bolio Tirso	20
Tamaulipas	Nelly Yo-lan Chao Quiñones	21
Tlaxcala	María de Lourdes Sánchez Bretón	18
Veracruz	María del Socorro Retolaza Ulloa	19
Yucatán	Mary Tony Gasque López	19
Zacatecas	Yanira Adriana Reveles Peréz	21

== Judges ==
They were the same Judges at the Preliminary and Final Competition.

- Federico Pizarro – Bullfighter
- Beatriz Calles – Events Organizer
- Luis José Santander – Actor
- Martha Cristiana Merino – Miss Mexico International 1986, Model & Actress
- Carlos Marcovich – Filmmaker
- Irán Eory – Actress
- Juan José Guerra Abud – Politician
- Raquel Goujón – Beauty Consultant
- Saul Lisazo – Actor

== Miss Dorian Grey competition ==
This was an internal competition, as part of the Steps to Fame Award in Nuestra Belleza México. The title was won by Katya Michel from San Luis Potosí and was crowned by the outgoing Miss Dorian Grey titleholder Elizabeth Carvajal.

The musical part was enlivened by the group Garibaldi.

=== Placements ===
Final results	Contestant
Miss Dorian Grey 1995	San Luis Potosí – Katya Michel
Suplente/1st Runner-up	(Chihuahua (state)) Chihuahua – Vanessa Guzmán
Top 10	(Mexico City) Distrito Federal – Adriana Fregoso; Jalisco – Tania Prado; Nayarit – Consuelo Rodríguez; Nuevo León – Alejandra Quintero; Puebla – Emireth López; Sonora – Lourdes Portela; Tlaxcala – Lourdes Sánchez; Veracruz – Socorro Retolaza

=== Judges ===
- Gerardo Rebollo – Fashion Coordinator
- José Luis Abarca – Fashion Designer
- Cecilia Cervera – Miss Dorian Grey 1988
- Martha De la Vega – Cosmetologist
- Cecilia Gisperr – Dorian Grey's Brand Manager
- Ana Patricia Rojo – Actress
- Rafael Rojas – Actor
