= Nuestra Belleza México 1997 =

4th edition of Nuestra Belleza México beauty pageant

- Date: September 20, 1997
- Presenters: Raúl Velasco, Karina Velasco
- Entertainment: Carlos Cuevas, Humberto Herrera, Aida Cuevas, Ballet Folklorico "México Tradicional"
- Venue: Salon Teotihuacan, Centro Internacional de Convenciones Acapulco, Acapulco, Guerrero, Mexico
- Broadcaster: Televisa
- Entrants: 32
- Placements: 16
- Winner: Katty Fuentes; Nuevo León

Nuestra Belleza México 1997, the 4th annual Nuestra Belleza México beauty pageant, was held at the Salon Teotihuacan of the Centro Internacional de Convenciones Acapulco of Acapulco, Guerrero, Mexico on September 20, 1997. Thirty-two contestants of the Mexican Republic competed for the national title, which was won by Katty Fuentes from Nuevo León, who later competed at Miss Universe 1998 in the US. Fuentes was crowned by outgoing Nuestra Belleza México titleholder Rebeca Tamez. She was the first Neoleonesa to win this title.

The Nuestra Belleza Mundo México title was won by Blanca Soto from Morelos, who later competed at Miss World 1997 in Seychelles. Soto was crowned by outgoing Nuestra Belleza Mundo México titleholder Yessica Salazar. She is the first and only contestant with short hair to win, as well as the first Morelense to win this Title.

For the second time in a row, two events were held separately to select the two winners for the titles Nuestra Belleza México and Nuestra Belleza Mundo México.

== Results ==
=== Nuestra Belleza México ===
Final results	Contestant
Nuestra Belleza México 1997	Nuevo León – Katty Fuentes
Suplente/1st Runner-up	Morelos – Blanca Soto
2nd Runner- up	(Mexico City) Distrito Federal – Felicidad Aveleyra
3rd Runner-up	(State of Mexico) Estado de México – Elizabeth Jiménez
4th Runner-up	Tabasco – Karla Corral
5th Runner-up	Aguascalientes – Patricia Amador
Top 16	Baja California – Carolina Castro; Campeche – Bárbara Macossay; Coahuila – Alejandra Mena; Colima – Karla Cortés; Durango – Karla Pescador; Guanajuato – Mónica Macías; Jalisco – Tatiana Ruvalcaba; Nayarit – Corina Torres; Sinaloa – Deyanira Penney; Tamaulipas – Kelly Nelson

=== Nuestra Belleza Mundo México ===
One week before the Final Competition was held, the Preliminary Competition featured a live show entitled "Nuestra Belleza Mexico: Rumbo a Miss Mundo" in which was announced that the winner of the Nuestra Belleza Mundo México title was Blanca Soto from Morelos, who would go on to represent Mexico at Miss World 1997. All contestants competed in swimsuit and evening gown categories during the contest.

The Nuestra Belleza Mundo México pageant was held at the Salon Teotihuacan of the Centro Internacional de Convenciones Acapulco in Acapulco, Guerrero, Mexico and was hosted by Raúl Velasco and Karina Velasco. It was the 2nd edition of the "Nuestra Belleza Mundo México" contest and as an official separate pageant to choose Mexico's representative to Miss World. The winner of this event also competed in the Final Competition, but only finished as the first runner-up.

The musical part was enlivened by the following groups: Sentidos Opuestos, Mœnia, Paulina Rubio and Vicente Fernández.

Final results	Contestant
Nuestra Belleza Mundo México 1997	Morelos – Blanca Soto
Suplente/1st Runner-up	(Mexico City) Distrito Federal – Felicidad Aveleyra
2nd Runner-up	Nuevo León – Katty Fuentes
3rd Runner-up	(State of Mexico) Estado de México – Elizabeth Jiménez
4th Runner-up	Nayarit – Corina Torres

== Contestants ==
State	Contestant	Age
Aguascalientes	María Patricia Amador Luján	21
Baja California	Carolina Vanessa Castro Mendoza	22
Baja California Sur	María Elizabeth Reyes Rodríguez	22
Campeche	Bárbara Macossay Arteaga	19
Coahuila	Alejandra Mena Ramírez	21
Colima	Karla Ofelia Cortés Figueroa	19
Chiapas	María Elena Peréz Peña	18
(Chihuahua (state)) Chihuahua	María Cristina Castro Loya	22
(Mexico City) Distrito Federal	Felicidad Aveleyra Talamantes	18
Durango	Karla Pescador De la Peña	18
(State of Mexico) Estado de México	Elizabeth Jiménez Dueñas	19
Guanajuato	Mónica Macías Chávez	18
Guerrero	Carla Coral López Solis	20
(Hidalgo (state)) Hidalgo	Gabriela García Muro	21
Jalisco	Tatiana Eileen Ruvalcaba Della Roca	18
Michoacán	María de Lourdes Romero Orozco	20
Morelos	Blanca Delfina Soto Benavides	18
Nayarit	Corina Torres Cañas	23
Nuevo León	Katty Fuentes García	20
Oaxaca	Annemie Santibañez Hoffmann	18
Puebla	Liliana Flores Bashbuch	18
Querétaro	Laura Manuela Barbeito Chávez	19
Quintana Roo	Luz María Cabrera Montoya	22
San Luis Potosí	Mayra Sandoval Martínez	21
Sinaloa	Deyanira Liliana Penney López	21
Sonora	Ana Laura Bernal Camarena	19
Tabasco	Karla Alejandra Corral Salomón	21
Tamaulipas	Kelly Ann Nelson González	18
Tlaxcala	Ivonne Corona Morales	18
Veracruz	Erika Beatríz Pérez Pérez	19
Yucatán	Amelia Sierra Calderón	18
Zacatecas	Gabriela Serrano Briones	20

== Judges ==
=== Preliminary competition ===
- Carlos Latapi – Photographer
- Rebeca Solano – Fashion Coordinator
- Tony Scheffler – Journalist
- Eugenia Cauduro – Model & Actress
- Mario Cimarro – Actor
- Rosario Pérez – Fashion Coordinator
