= Cynthia Duque =

Mexican beauty pageant titleholder (born 1992)

Cynthia Lizeth Duque Garza
- Born: Cynthia Lizeth Duque Garza; September 18, 1992 (age 34); Monterrey, Nuevo León, Mexico
- Height: 1.76 m (5 ft 9 1/2 in)
- Beauty pageant titleholder
- Hair color: Black
- Eye color: Black
- Major competitions: Nuestra Belleza Nuevo León 2012 (Winner); Nuestra Belleza México 2012 (Winner); Miss Universe 2013 (Unplaced); Miss United Continents 2016 (4th runner-up)

Cynthia Lizeth Duque Garza (born September 18, 1992) is a Mexican beauty pageant titleholder who won Nuestra Belleza México 2012 and represented Mexico at Miss Universe 2013.

Duque was crowned Nuestra Belleza Mexico 2012 at the grand finale of the 19th annual Nuestra Belleza Mexico which was held at the Mesoamerican Poliforum Convention Center in the capital of Chiapas on Saturday, September 1, 2012.

Duque represented Mexico at Miss Universe 2013 on November 9, 2013, in Moscow, Russia where she failed to place in the semifinals.

She was fourth runner up at Mis Continentes Unidos 2016.

Awards and achievements
| Preceded by (Aguascalientes) Karina González | Nuestra Belleza México; 2012 | Succeeded by (Baja California Sur) Josselyn Garciglia |
| Preceded by Ivette García | Nuestra Belleza Nuevo León; 2012 | Succeeded by Vanesa Montemayor |
