= Nuestra Belleza México 2010 =

17th edition of Nuestra Belleza México beauty pageant

- Date: September 25, 2010
- Presenters: Ernesto Laguardia, Marisol González
- Entertainment: Chino & Nacho
- Venue: Auditorio of Parque Las Maravillas, Saltillo, Coahuila, Mexico
- Broadcaster: Televisa
- Entrants: 31
- Placements: 15
- Withdrawals: Colima, Estado de México, Quintana Roo, Tlaxcala
- Returns: Tabasco
- Winner: Karin Ontiveros; Jalisco

Nuestra Belleza México 2010, the 17th annual Nuestra Belleza México beauty pageant, was held at the Auditorio Parque Las Maravillas in Saltillo, Coahuila, Mexico on September 25, 2010. The State of Jalisco, won for the third consecutive year with Karin Ontiveros, who later competed in Miss Universe 2011 in Brazil. Ontiveros was crowned by outgoing Nuestra Belleza México titleholder and Miss Universe 2010 Ximena Navarrete. She was the fourth Jalisciense to win this Title. Thirty-one contestants of the Mexican Republic competed for the national title.

The Nuestra Belleza Mundo México title was won by Cynthia de la Vega from Nuevo León, and she would compete in Miss World 2011 in United Kingdom. De la Vega was crowned by outgoing Nuestra Belleza Mundo México titleholder Anabel Solís. She was the third Neoleonesa to win this title, but she was dethroned 10 months later on July 29, 2011.

The Nuestra Belleza Internacional México title was won by Gabriela Palacio from Aguascalientes, who later competed in Miss International 2010 in China. Palacio was crowned by Miss International 2009 Anagabriela Espinoza after the show. On August 3, 2011, was announced that she would take the Nuestra Belleza Mundo México 2010 title and so she competed in Miss World 2011 in United Kingdom. She was the first Hidrocálida to win both Titles.

Karen Higuera from Baja California Sur was designated by the Nuestra Belleza México Organization as Nuestra Belleza Internacional México 2011 and later competed in Miss International 2011 in China. She was the first Sudcaliforniana to win this title.

The Recognition "Corona al Mérito 2010" was for Anagabriela Espinoza, Nuestra Belleza Mundo México 2007, Semi-finalist in Miss World 2008 and Miss International 2009.

== Results ==
=== Placements ===
| Placement | Contestant |
|---|---|
| Nuestra Belleza México 2010 | Jalisco – Karin Ontiveros |
| Nuestra Belleza Mundo México 2010 | Nuevo León – Cynthia de la Vega (dethroned) |
| 1st Runner-Up | Aguascalientes – Gabriela Palacio (assumed) |
| 2nd Runner-Up | Distrito Federal – Lucía Del Cueto |
| 3rd Runner-Up | Coahuila – Cecilia Flores |
| Top 10 | Aguascalientes – Estefanía Herrera; Baja California Sur – Karen Higuera; Jalisco – Eunice Sánchez; Sonora – Jessica Lerma; Yucatán – María Fernanda López |
| Top 15 | Michoacán – Karla Paulina Gutiérrez; Morelos – Melissa Torres; Sinaloa – Tiaré Oliva; Tamaulipas – Claudia González; Veracruz – Diana Botello |

=== Order of announcements ===
==== Top 15 ====
1. Morelos
2. Jalisco
3. Tamaulipas
4. Yucatán
5. Sonora
6. Nuevo León
7. Baja California Sur
8. Coahuila
9. Distrito Federal
10. Veracruz
11. Michoacán
12. Aguascalientes
13. Sinaloa
14. Aguascalientes
15. Jalisco

==== Top 10 ====
1. Yucatán
2. Sonora
3. Nuevo León
4. Jalisco
5. Jalisco
6. Distrito Federal
7. Coahuila
8. Baja California Sur
9. Aguascalientes
10. Aguascalientes

==== Top 5 ====
1. Aguascalientes
2. Coahuila
3. Distrito Federal
4. Jalisco
5. Nuevo León

=== Preliminary competition ===
The Preliminary Competition was held at the Auditorio of Parque Las Maravillas in Saltillo, Coahuila, Mexico a few days before to Final Competition. Prior to the final telecast, all contestants competed in swimsuit and evening gown as part of the selection for the others top 10 finalists who were revealed during the beginning of the two-hour live telecast of the Nuestra Belleza México 2010 Pageant live on Televisa on Saturday, September 25.

That night also took out the National Costume competition in which winning the representative from Sinaloa, Tiaré Oliva with "La Catrina". This costume was worn by the winner of Nuestra Belleza Mexico 2010 in Miss Universe 2011 winning the second place.

The Preliminary Competition was hosted by Alma Saint Martín and Patricio Cabezut.

| Final results | Contestant |
|---|---|
| Winner | Sinaloa – "La Catrina" |
| Top 5 | Baja California Sur – "La China Poblana"; Coahuila – "Tenochtitlán"; Jalisco – "Orgullo Jaliciense"; Michoacán – "Sentimientos de la Nación" |

=== Special awards ===
| Award | Contestant |
|---|---|
| Miss Top Model | Sonora – Jessica Lerma |
| Contestants' Choice | Yucatán – María Fernanda López |
| Miss Talent | Jalisco – Karin Ontiveros |
| Miss Sports | Morelos – Melissa Torres |
| Academic Award | Tamaulipas – Claudia González |
| Personality Fraiche | Distrito Federal – Lucia Del Cueto |
| Steps to Fame | Jalisco - Karin Ontiveros |

== Judges ==
They were the same judges at the Preliminary and Final Competition.

- Alberto Rodríguez – Fashion Designer
- Alfonso Waithsman – Makeup Artist
- Lissete Trapuad – Modeling Director & Director of RP
- Celina Del Villar – Model
- Jorge Aravena – Actor
- Tony Dalton – Actor
- Perla Beltrán – Nuestra Belleza Mundo México 2008
- Elsa Burgos – Miss Costa Maya International 2002 & Television Hostess
- Miguel Ángel Fox – Television Producer

== Background music ==
- Opening Number: "Nuestro México" by Contestants and "I Like It" by Enrique Iglesias ft. Pitbull
- Swimsuit Competition: "Mi Niña Bonita", "Tu Angelito" by Chino & Nacho
- Evening Gown Competition: "Cuando Me Enamoro" by Enrique Iglesias ft. Juan Luis Guerra
- Crowning Moment: "Nuestra Belleza" (Official Theme)

== Contestants ==
| State | Contestant | Age | Height (m) | Hometown |
|---|---|---|---|---|
| Aguascalientes | Estefanía Herrera García | 20 | 1.78 | Aguascalientes |
| Aguascalientes | Gabriela Palacio Díaz De León | 21 | 1.76 | Aguascalientes |
| Baja California | Nancy Marisol Galaz Piceno | 22 | 1.72 | Tijuana |
| Baja California Sur | Karen Alicia Higuera Contreras | 19 | 1.82 | La Paz |
| Campeche | Michelle Arjona Hernández | 18 | 1.73 | Campeche |
| Coahuila | Cecilia Flores Nogueira | 23 | 1.78 | Torreón |
| Chiapas | Adriana Grissel Hernández Cáseres | 22 | 1.80 | Tecpatán |
| Chihuahua | Pamela Olivas Chaparro | 23 | 1.78 | Chihuahua |
| Distrito Federal | Lucía Del Cueto Dávalos | 23 | 1.76 | Mexico City |
| Durango | Vanessa Crispín Herrera | 19 | 1.70 | Gómez Palacio |
| Guanajuato | Helena Estefanía Baca Anaya | 19 | 1.74 | León |
| Guerrero | Suslim Patrón Jiménez | 20 | 1.72 | Chilpancingo |
| Jalisco | Karin Cecilia Ontiveros Meza | 22 | 1.80 | Amatitán |
| Jalisco | Eunice Guadalupe Sánchez Valencia | 18 | 1.77 | Guadalajara |
| Michoacán | Karla Paulina Gutiérrez García | 21 | 1.80 | Morelia |
| Morelos | Melissa Carolina Torres Ruiz | 20 | 1.72 | Cuernavaca |
| Nayarit | Ana Priscila Zárate Cortez | 18 | 1.70 | Tepic |
| Nuevo León | Cynthia Alejandra De la Vega Oates | 18 | 1.80 | Monterrey |
| Oaxaca | Alejandra Díaz Scherenberg | 22 | 1.69 | Oaxaca |
| Puebla | Ana Laura Gallardo Parada | 20 | 1.68 | Puebla |
| Querétaro | María Perusquía Flores | 20 | 1.73 | Querétaro |
| San Luis Potosí | Carmen Isabel Hernández Chávez | 20 | 1.78 | San Luis Potosi |
| San Luis Potosí | Ana Paola Lastras Villaseñor | 22 | 1.76 | San Luis Potosi |
| Sinaloa | Tiaré Kristal Oliva Elguezabal | 18 | 1.78 | Topolobampo |
| Sonora | Erika Bernal López | 19 | 1.79 | Hermosillo |
| Sonora | Jessica María Lerma Palomares | 19 | 1.79 | Huatabampo |
| Tabasco | Ana Lilia Lucamendi González | 18 | 1.74 | Villahermosa |
| Tamaulipas | Claudia Maribel González Elizondo | 22 | 1.76 | Cd. Victoria |
| Veracruz | Diana Estefanía Botello Meza | 22 | 1.74 | Boca del Río |
| Yucatán | María Fernanda López Cuéllar | 22 | 1.76 | Mérida |
| Zacatecas | Stephanie Ávila Enciso | 19 | 1.73 | Jerez |

== Replacements ==
- Querétaro – Natasha Kaufmann was the winner of Nuestra Belleza Querétaro 2010. The Suplente/1st Runner-up, María Perusquía was who represented Querétaro in Nuestra Belleza México 2010. Natasha Kaufmann quit the state crown for school reasons, as the university where she studies, didn't give away the opportunity to participate in the national pageant, which is why she was forced to resign.
- Tamaulipas – Cecilia Ortíz was the winner of Nuestra Belleza Tamaulipas 2010. The Suplente/1st Runner-up, Claudia González was who represented Tamaulipas in Nuestra Belleza México 2010. Cecilia Ortíz quit the state crown for health problems that prevent her from participating in national competition.

== Designated ==
- Aguascalientes – Gabriela Palacio
- Jalisco – Eunice Sánchez
- San Luis Potosí – Paola Lastras
- Sonora – Jessica Lerma

== Returning states ==
- Last competed in 2008:
  - Tabasco

== Withdrawals ==
- Colima – Geraldine Valencia since the early days of concentration she began to feel unwell, so she decided to retire from competition before health was affected differently.
- Estado de México
- Quintana Roo
- Tlaxcala
- Hidalgo

== Significance ==
- Jalisco won the Nuestra Belleza México title for the fourth time and for third consecutive year (before 2000, 2008 and 2009).
- This year the crown of Nuestra Belleza México suffers his sixth change, this new model would continue only this year.
- Nuevo León won the Nuestra Belleza Mundo México title for the third time (before 1995 and 2007).
- This year the crown of Nuestra Belleza Mundo México suffers his third change, this new model would continue only this year.
- Aguascalientes won the Nuestra Belleza Internacional México title for the first time and was The Suplente/1st Runner-up for the second time (before 1994) .
- This year the crown of Nuestra Belleza Internacional México suffers his first change, this new model would continue only this year.
- Baja California Sur was appointed as Nuestra Belleza Internacional México for the first time.
- For the third time a Titleholder was dethroned to the title (Cynthia de la Vega, Nuestra Belleza Mundo México 2010).
- For the third time a Titleholders resigned to the title (Natasha Kaufmann, Nuestra Belleza Querétaro 2004 and Cecilia Ortíz Nuestra Belleza Tamaulipas 2010).
- For the first time in this pageant were together Miss Universe 2010 and Miss International 2009, both Mexicans.
- Tabasco return to competition after two years (2008).
- Jalisco was placed for the seventh consecutive year in the Top 5.
- Jalisco and Nuevo León were placed for the eighth consecutive year.
- Sonora was placed for the fifth consecutive year.
- Aguascalientes and Sinaloa were placed for the third consecutive year.
- Coahuila, Distrito Federal and Yucatán were placed for the second consecutive year.
- Michoacán returned to making calls to the semi-finals after four years (2006), Morelos, Tamaulipas and Veracruz after three years (2007) and Baja California Sur after two years (2008).
- States that were called to the semi-finals last year and this year failed to qualify were Baja California, Chiapas, Chihuahua, Estado de México, Querétaro and Zacatecas.
- Distrito Federal won Personality Fraiche Award for the first time.
- Jalisco won Miss Talent for the second time (before 2006), Steps to Fame Award for the first time, and Fuller Beauty Queen for the third consecutive year (after 2008 and 2009).
- Morelos won Miss Sports for the first time.
- Sinaloa won Best National Costume for the third time (before 2004 and 2003).
- Sonora won Miss Top Model for the first time.
- Tamaulipas won the Academic Award for the first time.
- Yucatán won Contestants' Choice for the first time.
- The host delegate, Cecilia Flores from Coahuila, won fourth place.
- For fifth time Ernesto Laguardia hosted Nuestra Belleza México, and for second time with Marisol González and Alma San Martín.
- Baja California Sur (Karen Higuera) is the higher delegate in this edition (1.82 m).
- Puebla (Ana Laura Gallardo) is the lower delegate in this edition (1.68 m).
- Delegates from Campeche, Colima, Distrito Federal, Guerrero, Nayarit, Morelos, Puebla, Tabasco and Zacatecas were elected by designation.

== Contestant notes ==
- Aguascalientes – Estefanía Herrera was Princess in Reina Nacional de la Feria de San Marcos 2010 in Aguascalientes. She is sister of Kimberly Herrera, Nuestra Belleza Aguascalientes 2008. Also she opened the center to make beauty queens in her state called "Stefy Herrera".
- Aguascalientes – Gabriela Palacio is the first delegate from her state to obtain a national title of the Nuestra Belleza México organization. She competed in Miss International 2010, held at Sichuan Province Gymnasium in Chengdu, China on November 7, 2010, where she won Miss Photogenic Award. She previously won the title as Reina Nacional de la Feria de San Marcos 2009 in Aguascalientes. On August 3, 2011, Palacio was designated to represent Mexico in Miss World 2011 after having dismissed to Cynthia de la Vega. This event was held at the Earls Court Two in London, England on November 6, 2011, but she didn't place. She was the Local Director of Nuestra Belleza Aguascalientes in 2012.
- Baja California Sur – Karen Higuera was selected to represent Mexico in Miss International 2011 held at the Sichuan Opera Theatre in Chengdu, China on November 6, 2011, where she won Miss Friendship Award, but she didn't place. Karen Higuera is married to the brother of Jessica García Formenti Nuestra Belleza Baja California Sur 2011.
- Colima – Geraldine Valencia was elected as Reina de la Feria de Todos los Santos Colima 2009 in Colima on October 30, 2009.
- Chiapas – Grissel Hernández competed in Miss All Nations 2012 where she won the Miss Charity Award.
- Chihuahua – Pamela Olivas was elected Miss Earth Chihuahua 2009 and she represented her State in the national competition Miss Earth México 2009 in Yucatán, where she won the title of Miss Air (1st Runner-up).
- Distrito Federal – Lucia Del Cueto is sister of María José Del Cueto, Nuestra Belleza Distrito Federal 2007. She was designated by the Miss México Travel Organization as Señorita Rostro de México 2011 giving the right to represent Mexico in Miss Supranational 2011 on August 27, 2011, in Płock, Poland, but as she was the Queen Award Personality Fraiche 2010 was necessarily be in the national competition of Nuestra Belleza México 2011 in August so that problems of dates with both contests is prevented from attending international competition of Miss Supranational 2011.
- Guerrero – Suslim Patrón participated in Srita. Flor de Noche Buena 2009–2010 in the Feria de San Mateo Navidad y Año Nuevo de Chilpancingo held in Chilpancingo, Guerrero on November 21, 2009, where she won 2nd Place.
- Jalisco – Karin Ontiveros represented Mexico in Miss Universe 2011 in the Credicard Hall in São Paulo, Brazil on September 12, 2011, but she didn't place. She won the second place in the National Costume competition with "La Catrina". Two months after competing in the Miss Universe 2011 pageant Ontiveros was pursuing a modeling career with Hollywood Model Management in Los Angeles. She currently appears on ESPN Deportes and ESPN Latin America on various programs and segments. In 2015 she is married.
- Jalisco – Eunice Sánchez was designated as Miss Universidad World México 2010 and represented Mexico in World Miss University 2010 in Seoul, South Korea where she won Miss Best Dresser award and she made to Semi-finalists.
- Michoacán – Karla Paulina Gutiérrez was elected by Miss Mexico Travel Organization to compete in Miss Tourism Queen International 2011 representing Mexico on December 27, 2011, in Xi'an, China, but she didn't place. She was elected Miss Gaming México 2012 and she represented Mexico in the Miss Gaming International 2012 pageant. Also she competed in Reina Mundial del Banano 2012 in Ecuador where she was 2nd Runner-up. Now she lives in Mexico City since 2011. After in 2015 she competed in Miss Grand México 2015 and finished Finalist in the Top 5 representing Distrito Federal.
- Morelos – Melissa Torres is originally from Hermosillo, Sonora, but she represented the state of Morelos, where she currently lives, in Cuernavaca.
- Nayarit – Priscila Zárate was crowned Miss Earth Nayarit 2011 and she competed in Miss Earth Mexico 2011 on September 16, 2011, in Cancún, Quintana Roo where she was a finalist in the Top 8.
- Nuevo León – Cynthia de la Vega is a professional model who won the 2008 Elite Model Look Mexico contest and subsequently participated in the international final, held in Sanya, China on November 1 of that year. She would represent Mexico in Miss World 2011 but she was dethroned on July 29, 2011, for not fulfilling functions as the current reigning queen, and so she didn't compete in Miss World 2011.Also she is the niece of Letty Coppel, Señorita Sinaloa 1991 and 2nd Runner-up in Señorita México 1991. Currently she is studying finance at the Universidad de Monterrey in his native of San Pedro Garza García.
- San Luis Potosí – Carmen Hernández competed in the second Reina Internacional del Transporte pageant in Duitama, Colombia on January 10, 2011, and won the first Crown for Mexico. At the time of her crown, broke the dress, revealing a breast for what the public immediately set his sights on it. Also she competed in Reina Internacional del Joropo pageant in Venezuela in July 2011 where she was 3rd Runner-up and she received the Reina de los Periodistas award. Also she won the right to represent Mexico in Miss Princess of the World 2011 held in Czech Republic on October 1, 2011, where she won the first crown for Mexico. She married on 2013.
- Sonora – Jessica Lerma was elected to represent Mexico in Reina Mundial del Banano 2014 in Ecuador, where she was 2nd Runner-up and won the Best National Costume Award. On 2015 she was elected Miss Grand Huatabampo 2016 to compete in Miss Grand México 2016.
- Tabasco – Lilia Lucamendi lives in Mexico City for her studies.
- Veracruz – Diana Botello is a businesswoman, as she has her own Boutique called "Di-Bo Modelaje & Boutique" in which, in addition to selling Clothing Youth are also taught modeling classes for girls who want to aspire to a Beauty Title. She was Señorita Turismo y Cultura Veracruz 2008.
- Yucatán – María Fernanda López was born in Tehuacán, Puebla, but she represented the state of Yucatán as she has lived in Mérida for several years.

=== Crossovers ===
Contestants who had competed or will compete at other beauty pageants:

Miss Universe

- 2011: Jalisco: Karin Ontiveros

Miss World

- 2011: Aguascalientes: Gabriela Palacio

Miss International

- 2010: Aguascalientes: Gabriela Palacio
- 2011: Baja California Sur: Karen Higuera

Miss Supranational

- 2016: Nuevo León: Cynthia de la Vega (TBD)

World Miss University

- 2010: Jalisco: Eunice Sánchez (Top 10)

Miss Tourism Queen International

- 2011: Michoacán: Karla Paulina Gutiérrez

Miss Princess of the World

- 2011: San Luis Potosí: Carmen Hernández (Winner)

Miss Gaming International

- 2012: Michoacán: Karla Paulina Gutiérrez

Reina Mundial del Banano

- 2012: Michoacán: Karla Paulina Gutiérrez (2nd Runner-up)
- 2014: Sonora: Jessica Lerma (2nd Runner-up)

Miss All Nations

- 2012: Chiapas: Grissel Hernández

Reina Internacional del Transporte

- 2011: San Luis Potosí: Carmen Hernández (Winner)

Reina Internacional del Joropo

- 2011: San Luis Potosí: Carmen Hernández (3rd Runner-up)

Miss Earth México

- 2009: Chihuahua: Pamela Olivas (Miss Air/1st Runner-up)
- 2011: Nayarit: Priscila Zárate (Top 8)

Miss Grand México

- 2015: Michoacán: Karla Paulina Gutiérrez (Top 5)
  - Distrito Federal's representative

Reina de la Feria de San Marcos

- 2009: Aguascalientes: Gabriela Palacio (Winner)
- 2010: Aguascalientes: Estefanía Herrera (Princess)

Señorita Flor de Noche Buena

- 2009: Guerrero: Suslim Patrón (1st Runner-up)

Nuestra Belleza Aguascalientes

- 2010: Aguascalientes: Gabriela Palacio (Suplente/1st Runner-up)
