= Nuestra Belleza Aguascalientes 2011 =

- Date: July 7, 2011
- Venue: Hotel Marriott, Aguascalientes, Aguascalientes
- Broadcaster: Televisa Aguascalientes
- Entrants: 7
- Placements: 4
- Winner: Karina González; Aguascalientes City

Nuestra Belleza Aguascalientes 2011 was held in the Hotel Marriott, Aguascalientes, Aguascalientes on July 7, 2011. At the conclusion of the final night of competition Karina González of Aguascalientes City was crowned the winner. González was crowned by outgoing Nuestra Belleza Aguascalientes titleholder Estefanía Herrera. Seven contestants competed for the title.

== Results ==
=== Placements ===
Final results	Contestant
Nuestra Belleza Aguascalientes 2011	Karina González
Suplente / 1st Runner-up	Roberta Sánchez
2nd Runner-up	Gabriela Delgado
3rd Runner-up	Mariana Quezada

== Contestants ==
Hometown	Contestant
Aguascalientes	Gabriela Delgado
Aguascalientes	Karina González
Aguascalientes	Karla Martínez
Aguascalientes	María José Torrado
Aguascalientes	Mariana Quezada
Aguascalientes	Roberta Sánchez
Calvillo	Sandra López

== Contestants notes ==
- Karina González won the Reina de la feria Nacional de San Marcos 2010 contest. She also obtained the 2011 Nuestra Belleza México title and will compete in Miss Universe 2012.
- Gabriela Delgado was designated to participate in Nuestra Belleza México 2011 and placed into the semifinals, competed in Swimsuit and Evening Gown, finishing 6th overall.
- Roberta Sanchez won the title La Catrina 2010 and was the queen for the 2010 Festival Internacional de las Calaveras.
