= Nuestra Belleza Guanajuato 2012 =

- Date: July 6, 2012
- Venue: Centro Explora, León, Guanajuato
- Broadcaster: Televisa
- Entrants: 8
- Placements: 3
- Winner: Elisa Espinoza; Celaya

Nuestra Belleza Guanajuato 2012, was a beauty pageant, held at the Centro Explora of León, Guanajuato on July 6, 2012. At the conclusion of the final night of competition, Elisa Espinoza from Celaya was crowned the winner. Espinoza was crowned by outgoing Nuestra Belleza Mundo México titleholder Mariana Berumen. Eight contestants competed for the title.

== Results ==
=== Placements ===
| Final results | Contestant |
|---|---|
| Nuestra Belleza Guanajuato 2012 | Elisa Espinoza |
| Suplente / 1st Runner-up | Paulina Carlos |
| 2nd Runner-up | Andrea Olvera |
| 3rd Runner-up | Miranda Fraustro |

== Contestants ==
| Hometown | Contestant |
|---|---|
| Apaseo el Grande | Andrea Olvera Valdés |
| Celaya | Elisa Espinoza Gómez |
| León | Paulina Carlos Gutiérrez |
| León | Miranda Montserrat Frausto |
| León | Diana Sánchez Muñoz |
| León | Alejandra Mendoza Luna |
| Moroleón | Vera Orozco Pantoja |
| San Francisco del Rincón | Erika Gómez Cruz |
