= Nuestra Belleza México 2011 =

18th edition of Nuestra Belleza México beauty pageant

- Date: August 20, 2011
- Presenters: Javier Poza, Jacqueline Bracamontes
- Entertainment: Luis Fonsi, Telefunka, Joan Sebastian
- Venue: Centro Internacional de Convenciones, Puerto Vallarta, Jalisco, Mexico
- Broadcaster: Televisa
- Entrants: 34
- Placements: 15
- Withdrawals: Guerrero
- Returns: Estado de México; Hidalgo; Quintana Roo
- Winner: Karina González; Aguascalientes

Nuestra Belleza México 2011, the 18th annual Nuestra Belleza México beauty pageant, was held at the Centro Internacional de Convenciones in Puerto Vallarta, Jalisco, Mexico on August 20, 2011. Thirty-four contestants from the Mexican Republic competed for the national title, which was won by Karina González from Aguascalientes who later competed in Miss Universe 2012 in the United States, where she was a Semifinalist in the Top 10. González was crowned by outgoing Nuestra Belleza México titleholder Karin Ontiveros and Miss Universe 2010 titleholder Ximena Navarrete. She was the first Hidrocalida to win this title.

The Nuestra Belleza Mundo México title was won by Mariana Berumen from Guanajuato who later competed in Miss World 2012 in China, where she was a semifinalist in the Top 15. Berumen was crowned by outgoing Nuestra Belleza Mundo México titleholder Gabriela Palacio and Miss Universe 2010 titleholder Ximena Navarrete. She was the second Guanajuatense to win this title.

Jessica García Formenti from Baja California Sur was designated by the Nuestra Belleza México Organization as Nuestra Belleza Internacional México 2012. She competed in Miss International 2012 in Japan where she was a semifinalist in the Top 15. She was the second Sudcaliforniana to win this title.

The recognition "Corona al Mérito 2011" was for Jacqueline Bracamontes, Nuestra Belleza México 2000 titleholder and actress.

== Results ==
=== Placements ===
Placement	Contestant
Nuestra Belleza México 2011	Aguascalientes – Karina González
Nuestra Belleza Mundo México 2011	Guanajuato – Mariana Berumen
1st Runner-Up	Estado de México – Nohemí Hermosillo
2nd Runner-Up	Sinaloa – Grecia Gutiérrez
3rd Runner-Up	Jalisco – Lucía Silva
Top 10	Aguascalientes – Gabriela Delgado; Distrito Federal – Mónica Gómez; Sinaloa – Paloma Llanes; Sonora – Laura Palacio; Sonora – Paulina Burrola
Top 15	Baja California Sur – Jessica García Formenti; Chiapas – Kristell Padilla; Durango – Mónica Ayala; Morelos – Siri Mazari; Nuevo León – Ángela Cantú

=== Order of announcements ===
==== Top 15 ====
1. Distrito Federal
2. Aguascalientes
3. Durango
4. Sinaloa
5. Jalisco
6. Sinaloa
7. Sonora
8. Baja California Sur
9. Morelos
10. Chiapas
11. Nuevo León
12. Aguascalientes
13. Sonora
14. Guanajuato
15. Estado de México

==== Top 10 ====
1. Estado de México
2. Sinaloa
3. Sonora
4. Aguascalientes
5. Sonora
6. Aguascalientes
7. Sinaloa
8. Jalisco
9. Guanajuato
10. Distrito Federal

==== Top 5 ====
1. Estado de México
2. Aguascalientes
3. Guanajuato
4. Sinaloa
5. Jalisco

=== Preliminary competition ===
The Preliminary Competition was held at the Centro Internacional de Convenciones of Puerto Vallarta, Jalisco, Mexico a few days before to Final Competition. Prior to the final telecast, all contestants competed in swimsuit and evening gown categories as part of the selection for the other top 10 finalists who were revealed during the beginning of the two-hour live telecast of the Nuestra Belleza México 2011 Pageant live on Televisa on Saturday, August 20, 2011.

The Preliminary Competition was hosted by Karin Ontiveros and Jan.

The musical part was enlivened by: Telefunka.

=== National costume competition ===
In this competition the contestants are not evaluated, only the costumes. It is a competition showing the country's wealth embodied in the colorful and fascinating costumes made by Mexican designers combining the past and present of Mexico.

This event is important for the Nuestra Belleza México Organization because it discloses the creative work of Mexican designers and also elects the costume to represent Mexico in Miss Universe the next year. Also, some costumes are elected to represent Mexico in other beauty contests.

The winning costume designer received the "Aguja Diamante Award."

Final results	Contestant
Winner	Durango – "Diosa de la Plata"'
Top 5	Campeche – "Serpiente Emplumada"; Oaxaca "Flor Tehuana"; Sinaloa – "Ángel Azteca"; Yucatán – "La Cultura Maya Vive"

- Aguascalientes – "Viñedos Fiesta San Marcos"
- Baja California – "Oasis Bajacaliforniano"
- Baja California Sur – "Linda Chiapaneca" (Competed in Miss International 2011)
- Campeche – "Serpiente Emplumada"
- Colima – "Doncella Maya"
- Colima – "Jimadora, Raíces de Nuestra Tierra"
- Chiapas – "Tiempo de Tradición"
- Durango – "Diosa de la Plata" (1st Runner-up in Miss Universe 2012)

- Durango – "Fiesta, Danza y Tradiciones"
- Durango – "Escaramuza Charra"
- Oaxaca – "Flor Tehuana"
- Oaxaca – "Nuestra Herencia"
- Sinaloa – "Ángel Azteca" (Competed in Reina Hispanoamericana 2011)
- Tabasco – "Amor Mestizo"
- Veracruz – "Tesoro Totonaca"
- Yucatán – "La Cultura Maya Vive"

=== Special awards ===
Award	Contestant
Miss Top Model	Jalisco – Lucía Silva
Contestants' Choice	Sinaloa – Grecia Gutiérrez
Miss Talent	Aguascalientes – Karina González
Miss Sports	(Mexico City) Distrito Federal – Mónica Gómez
Academic Award	Durango – Mónica Ayala
Personality Fraiche	Jalisco – Lucía Silva
Steps to Fame	Aguascalientes – Karina González

== Judges ==
They were the same judges at the Preliminary and Final Competition.

- Luis Moya – Dermatologist
- Maru Ruíz de Icaza – Editor
- Arturo Velasco – Televisa Music Director
- Dafne Molina – Nuestra Belleza Mundo México 2004
- Dr. José Abel de la Peña- Plastic Surgeon
- Jordi Avendaño – Photographer
- Aurora Valle – Television Hostess & Journalist
- Juan José Origel – Journalist
- Gabriel Soto – El Modelo México 1996 & Actor

== Background music ==
- Opening Number: "La Vida es una Pasarela" by Bianca Marroquín
- Intermediate: "Respira" by Luis Fonsi
- Swimsuit Competition: "Chocolate" by Telefunka
- Honored to Ximena Navarrete: "Dios Mío, Qué Mujer" by Joan Sebastián
- Evening Gown Competition: "Moneymoon" by Telefunka
- Crowning Moment: "Nuestra Belleza" (Official Theme)

== Contestants ==
State	Contestant	Age	Height (m)	Hometown
Aguascalientes	Laura Karina González Muñoz	20	1.76	Aguascalientes
Aguascalientes	Gabriela Elizabeth Delgado Rodríguez	23	1.80	Aguascalientes
Baja California	Gabriela Acuña Eyraud	19	1.72	Tecate
Baja California Sur	Jessica Cecilia García Formetí-Canseco	21	1.78	La Paz
Campeche	Karla Eugenia Buenfil Ayala	21	1.80	Campeche
Coahuila	Diana Eloísa Ávila Ibarra	23	1.74	Torreón
Colima	Ana Karen Martínez Salazar	18	1.72	Manzanillo
Chiapas	Kristell Padilla Sáyago	21	1.73	Tonalá
(Chihuahua (state)) Chihuahua	María Fernanda Carranza Ramírez	22	1.73	Cd. Juárez
(Mexico City) Distrito Federal	Mónica Gómez Ortega	20	1.72	Mexico City
Durango	Mónica Ivette Ayala Venegas	22	1.73	Durango
(State of Mexico) Estado de México	Nohemí Hermosillo Villalobos	20	1.73	Toluca
Guanajuato	Mariana Berumen Reynoso	19	1.78	León
(Hidalgo (state)) Hidalgo	Martha Lili Marlene Rosales López	23	1.72	Pachuca
Jalisco	Lucía Silva González	20	1.72	Puerto Vallarta
Michoacán	Edna Paola Álvarez Madriz	18	1.73	Nueva Italia
Morelos	Siri Mazari Lizárraga	23	1.72	Cuernavaca
Nayarit	Linda Rubí Ugarte Osuna	19	1.69	Tepic
Nuevo León	Ivette Alejandra García De Hoyos	22	1.74	Monterrey
Nuevo León	Ángela Anahí Cantú Sánchez	23	1.80	Guadalupe
Oaxaca	María Teresa Raviella Guerrero	19	1.74	Río Grande
Puebla	Claudia Aranza Barbosa Lima	20	1.74	Tehuacán
Querétaro	Adriana Martínez de Anda	19	1.73	Querétaro
Quintana Roo	Valery Antoniette Gantert Beristáin	18	1.79	Cancún
San Luis Potosí	Lorena Alvarado Zermeño	19	1.70	San Luis Potosí
Sinaloa	Grecia Yoselin Gutiérrez Godoy	22	1.78	Los Mochis
Sinaloa	Paloma del Rocío Llanes Germán	18	1.70	Los Mochis
Sonora	Laura Palacio Núñez	21	1.77	Puerto Peñasco
Sonora	Paulina Burrola Morales	20	1.72	Hermosillo
Tabasco	Martha del Rocío Espinosa Rios	20	1.73	Villahermosa
Tamaulipas	Karen Alejandra Lizcano Flores	19	1.80	Tampico
Veracruz	Beatríz Adriana Zavaleta Mendoza	22	1.76	Boca del Río
Yucatán	Jessica Margarita Duarte Hermida	21	1.72	Mérida
Zacatecas	Michelle Román Hurtado	20	1.77	Zacatecas

== Designates ==
- Aguascalientes – Gabriela Delgado
- Nuevo León – Ángela Cantú
- Sinaloa – Paloma Llanes
- Sonora – Paulina Burrola

== Returning states ==
- Last competed in 2008:
  - Hidalgo

- Last competed in 2009:
  - (State of Mexico) Estado de México
  - Quintana Roo

== Withdrawals ==
- Guerrero

== Significance ==
- Aguascalientes won the Nuestra Belleza México title for the first time.
- This year the crown of Nuestra Belleza México was replaced for the seventh time after begin damaged, and this new version is still used today.
- Guanajuato won the Nuestra Belleza Mundo México title for the second time (before 1998).
- This year the crown of Nuestra Belleza Mundo México suffers his fourth change, this new model continues today.
- Baja California Sur was appointed as Nuestra Belleza Internacional México for the second time (before 2010).
- This year the crown of Nuestra Belleza Internacional México was replaced for the second time after damages, this new version continues today.
- Estado de México was the Suplente/1st Runner-up for the first time
- In this edition Ximena Navarrete Miss Universe 2010 was Honored.
- Estado de México and Quintana Roo returns to competition after two years (2009) and Hidalgo return to competition after three years (2008).
- Jalisco was placed for the eighth consecutive year in the Top 5.
- Aguascalientes was placed for the second consecutive year in the Top 5.
- Jalisco and Nuevo León were placed for the ninth consecutive year.
- Sonora was placed for the sixth consecutive year.
- Aguascalientes and Sinaloa were placed for the fourth consecutive year.
- Distrito Federal was placed for the third consecutive year.
- Morelos and Baja California Sur were placed for the second consecutive year.
- Durango returned to making calls to the semi-finals after six years (2005), Guanajuato after three years (2008) and Chiapas and Estado de México after two years (2009).
- States that were called to the semi-finals last year and this year failed to qualify were Coahuila, Yucatán, Tamaulipas and Veracruz.
- Aguascalientes won Miss Talent and Steps to Fame Award for the first time.
- Distrito Federal won Miss Sports for the third time (before 2006 and 2007).
- Durango won the Academic Award and Best National Costume for the first time.
- Jalisco won Miss Top Model and Personality Fraiche Award for the first time.
- Sinaloa won Contestants' Choice for the second time (before 2008).
- The host delegate, Lucía Silva from Jalisco, won fourth place.
- For the first time Javier Poza hosted the pageant with Jacqueline Bracamontes who was her fifth time.
- Aguascalientes (Gabriela Delgado), Campeche (Karla Buenfil), Nuevo León (Ángela Cantú) and Tamaulipas (Karen Lizcano) are the tallest delegates in this edition (1.80 m).
- Nayarit (Linda Ugarte), San Luis Potosí (Lorena Alvarado), Sinaloa (Paloma Llanes) and Yucatán (Jessica Duarte) are the shortest delegates in this edition (1.70 m).
- Delegates from Campeche, Colima, Chihuahua, Distrito Federal, Hidalgo, Morelos and Tabasco were elected by designation.
- Estado de México's contest held after 10 years of sending candidates for appointment.

== Contestant notes ==
- Aguascalientes – Karina González was Reina Nacional de la Feria de San Marcos 2010. Represented Mexico at the Miss Universe 2012 competition held in Las Vegas, Nevada, US on December 19, 2012. She was one of the favorites prior to the coronation night. She placed in the Top 16 and advanced further to the Top 10, wearing a resplendent red evening gown with generous slit. The design of the gown she wore was reminiscent of what Miss Universe 2010 and fellow Mexican Ximena Navarrete wore when she was crowned in Las Vegas, Nevada.
- Baja California Sur – Jessica García Formenti was Miss Earth Baja California Sur 2009 and she obtained the title of Miss Water (2nd Runner-up) in the national contest of Miss Earth México 2009 in Mérida, Yucatán. She is cousin of Yaneth García Formenti Miss Earth Baja California Sur 2010, Miss Water (2nd Runner-up) in Miss Earth México 2010 and Miss América Latina México 2011, 4th Runner-up in Miss Latin America 2011. She was selected to compete in Miss International 2012 and was a semi-finalist in the Top 15. Jessica García Formenti is the sister of the husband of Karen Higuera.
- Coahuila – Diana Ávila was 2nd Runner-up at Nuestra Belleza Coahuila 2010.
- Colima – Ana Karen Martínez fell on stage in evening gown competition in the semi-final night of the contest.
- (State of Mexico) Estado de México – Nohemí Hermosillo was part of the contestants of Mexico's Next Top Model first cycle (2009) and she obtained the second place in the final competition. She is from Jalisco. She works as a model with Apple Model Management in Bangkok, Thailand.
- Guanajuato – Mariana Berumen was born in Jalostotitlán, Jalisco but she moved to León, Guanajuato from an early age, represented Mexico at Miss World 2012 pageant held in Ordos City, Inner Mongolia, China. She was one of the favorites prior to the coronation night. She placed in the Top 20 at Miss World Beach Beauty, 2nd Runner-up at Miss World Top Model, Top 10 at Beauty with a Purpose and 1st Runner-up at Multimedia Award. At the final night she only placed in the Top 15. Actually she works as a Model and was the 1st Runner-up of Mexico's Next Top Model 2014.
- Hidalgo – Lili Rosales was born in Tequila, Jalisco. She was elected to compete in Reina Hispanoamericana 2011 held in Santa Cruz, Bolivia on October 27, 2011. She was in the Top 5 of the National Costume competition, but she didn't place.
- Morelos – Siri Mazari was Miss Earth Morelos 2009 and she obtained the title of Miss Fire (3rd Runner-up) in the national contest of Miss Earth México 2009 in Mérida, Yucatán. Actually is a professional Model. She is daughter of Maria del Jesus Mazari Señorita Morelos 1980.
- Nuevo León – Ángela Cantú was Señorita UANL 2009 in her university when she was studying dentistry. Also she is a professional model.
- Nuevo León – Ivette García is a runner and specializes in the 200 m. and 400 m. dash. She was part of the Mexican Team who competed in the 2010 IAAF World Championships in Athletics in the 4x400 relay team. She was the 1st Runner-up in Elite Model Look Monterrey 2009.
- Quintana Roo – Valery Gantert is of Spanish parents.
- Sinaloa – Paloma Llanes was elected to compete in Miss Mesoamerica International 2015 and won the Title.
- Sonora – Laura Palacio is sister of Elizabeth Palacio Nuestra Belleza Sonora 2002. Also she was elected Miss Earth Sonora 2011 in the 2010 edition of Miss Earth Sonora but she did not participate in Miss Earth México 2011 because also was elected Nuestra Belleza Sonora 2011 and participated in the 2011 edition of Nuestra Belleza México and was a Semi-finalist in the Top 10.
- Tamaulipas – Karen Lizcano was designated as Miss Petite Universe Tamaulipas 2015 obtained the right to represent Tamaulipas in the Miss Petite Universe México 2015 pageant.
- Yucatán – Jéssica Duarte came out in the semi-final stage with a splint on her left arm after the arm was injured in the concentration.

=== Crossovers ===
Contestants who have competed or will compete at other beauty pageants:

Miss Universe

- 2012: Aguascalientes: Karina González (Top 10)

Miss World

- 2012: Guanajuato: Mariana Berumen (Top 15)

Miss International

- 2012: Baja California Sur: Jessica García Formenti (Top 15)

Reina Hispanoamericana

- 2011: Hidalgo: Lili Rosales

Mexico's Next Top Model

- 2009: (State of Mexico) Estado de México: Nohemí Hermosillo (1st Runner-up)
- 2014: Guanajuato: Mariana Berumen (1st Runner-up)

Miss Earth México

- 2009: Baja California Sur: Jessica García Formenti (Miss Water/2nd Runner-up)
- 2009: Morelos: Siri Mazari (Miss Fire/3rd Runner-up)

Miss Petite Universe México

- 2015: Tamaulipas: Karen Lizcano

Miss Mesoamerica Internacional

- 2015: Sinaloa: Paloma Llanes (Winner)

Reina de la Feria de San Marcos

- 2010: Aguascalientes: Karina González (Winner)

Señorita UANL

- 2009: Nuevo León: Ángela Cantú (Winner)

Nuestra Belleza Coahuila

- 2010: Coahuila: Diana Ávila (2nd Runner-up)
