= Cynthia de la Vega =

Mexican model (born 1991)

- Born: Cynthia Alejandra de la Vega Oates; September 28, 1991 (age 35); San Pedro, Nuevo León, Mexico
- Height: 1.80 m (5 ft 11 in)
- Beauty pageant titleholder
- Title: Nuestra Belleza Nuevo León 2010; Miss Supranational Mexico 2016
- Hair color: Brown
- Eye color: Brown
- Major competitions: Nuestra Belleza México 2010 (Dethroned – Nuestra Belleza Mundo México); Miss Supranational 2016 (Top 25)

Cynthia Alejandra de la Vega Oates (born 28 September 1991) is a Mexican model and beauty Queen.

== Biography ==
A native of San Pedro Garza García, Nuevo León, Cynthia was chosen to represent her country in the 61st Miss World pageant in 2011 during the 17th edition of Nuestra Belleza México, held September 25, 2010 in Saltillo, Coahuila. The pageant was won by Jalisco's Karin Ontiveros of Jalisco. De la Vega was crowned Nuestra Belleza Mundo México by the outgoing titleholder Anabel Solís. She previously won the Elite Model Look contest of Mexico in 2008 and subsequently participated in the international final, held in Sanya, China on November 1 of that year. She was dethroned on July 13, 2011, for not fulfilling functions as the current reigning queen and was replaced by Gabriela Palacio of Aguascalientes.

5 years later, she was announced as Miss Supranational Mexico by the former director of Miss Mexico the late Hugo Castellanos. De la Vega representing Mexico at the 8th edition of Miss Supranational scheduled for 02 December, 2016 at the Krynica-Zdroj, Poland who finished in the Top 25.

Awards and achievements
Preceded by (Jalisco) Karina Martín	Miss Supranational Mexico; 2016	Succeeded by (Guerrero) Samantha Leyva
Preceded by (Yucatán) Anabel Solís	Nuestra Belleza Mundo México (Dethroned); 2010	Succeeded by (Guanajuato) Mariana Berumen
