= Nuestra Belleza Guanajuato 2011 =

- Date: July 15, 2011
- Venue: Club de Leones, Pénjamo, Guanajuato
- Broadcaster: Televisa
- Entrants: 7
- Placements: 3
- Winner: Mariana Berumen; León

Nuestra Belleza Guanajuato 2011, was held at the Club de Leones of Pénjamo, Guanajuato on July 15, 2011. At the conclusion of the final night of competition, Mariana Berumen of León was crowned the winner. Berumen was crowned by outgoing Nuestra Belleza Guanajuato titleholder Helena Baca. Seven contestants competed for the title.

== Results ==
=== Placements ===
Final results	Contestant
Nuestra Belleza Guanajuato 2011	Mariana Berumen
Suplente / 1st Runner-up	Carolina Miranda
2nd Runner-up	Yesenia Macías
3rd Runner-up	Ingrid Nito

== Contestants ==
Hometown	Contestant	Age
Pénjamo	Karina Rodríguez Valtierra	19
León	Sandra Alejandra Hernández López	21
León	Thalia Marcel Aguirre García	20
Irapuato	Carolina Miranda Olvera	20
León	Yesenia Macías Atilano	20
Irapuato	Ingrid Nito Arreche	21
León	Mariana Berumen	19
