= Nuestra Belleza Coahuila 2011 =

- Date: July 15, 2011
- Presenters: Daniel Poza, Susu Luna
- Venue: Teatro Nazas, Torreón, Coahuila
- Broadcaster: Televisa
- Entrants: 10
- Placements: 3
- Winner: Diana Ávila; Torreón

Nuestra Belleza Coahuila 2011, was held at the Teatro Nazas in Torreón, Coahuila on July 15, 2011. At the conclusion of the final night of competition, Diana Ávila of Torreón was crowned the winner. Ávila was crowned by outgoing Nuestra Belleza Coahuila titleholder, Cecilia Flores. Ten contestants competed for the state title.

== Results ==
=== Placements ===
| Final results | Contestant |
|---|---|
| Nuestra Belleza Coahuila 2011 | Diana Ávila |
| Suplente / 1st Runner-up | Lydia Cruz |
| 2nd Runner-up | Valeria Barquera |

=== Special awards ===
| Award | Contestant |
|---|---|
| Miss Congeniality | María Patricia Hermosillo |
| Best Face | Anna Martinez Tamez |

== Judges ==
- Daniel Morado Acosta - Photographer
- Abril Cervera - Designer
- Melchor Cadena - Advertising Director
- Maricarmen Rodríguez - Image Consultant

== Background Music ==
- Sandoval

== Contestants ==
| Hometown | Contestant |
|---|---|
| Saltillo | Ana Rosa Martínez Tamez |
| Torreón | María Patricia Hermosillo Aguirre |
| Torreón | Sabrina Sáenz Jiménez |
| Torreón | Vaeria Barquera Macías |
| Torreón | Lydia Jocelyn Cruz Rangel |
| Torreón | Luisa Fernanda Carrillo Rodríguez |
| Torreón | Marlen Italia Aguilera Quiñones |
| Torreón | Jéssica Paola Alonso Ramírez |
| Torreón | Diana Eloísa Ávila Ibarra |
| Torreón | Berenice Díaz Venegas |
