= Wendolly Esparza =

Mexican model and journalist

- Born: Wendolly Esparza Delgadillo; June 28, 1991 (age 35); Evanston, Illinois, U.S.
- Height: 1.73 m (5 ft 8 in)
- Beauty pageant titleholder
- Title: Nuestra Belleza Aguascalientes 2014; Nuestra Belleza México 2014
- Hair color: Black
- Eye color: Dark brown
- Major competitions: Nuestra Belleza Aguascalientes 2014 (Winner); Nuestra Belleza México 2014 (Winner); Miss Universe 2015 (Top 15)

Wendolly Esparza Delgadillo (born June 28, 1991) is a Mexican-American journalist, model and beauty pageant titleholder who won Nuestra Belleza México 2014 and represented Mexico at Miss Universe 2015 pageant where she placed in the top fifteen.

== Early life ==
Wendolly Esparza was born in Illinois, but hails from the central Mexican state of Aguascalientes and has two siblings (one brother and one sister). She graduated from the Loyola University Chicago's School of Communication with a bachelor's degree in journalism with a minor in Latin American Literature in 2013. In between her studies, Esparza took part as a local news intern for Univision Chicago. Soon after, she returned to Mexico and found herself participating in beauty pageants, the first of which was during the 2014 Feria Nacional de San Marcos.

== Pageantry ==
Wendolly Esparza competed in and won her state's preliminary contest Nuestra Belleza Aguascalientes 2014 in order to advance to the national competition Nuestra Belleza México. She eventually beat out thirty-one other contestants from all over the country during the 2014 edition of that nationwide event directed by former Miss Universe Lupita Jones. Esparza's crowning, which automatically gave her the right of representing Mexico at the Miss Universe 2015 pageant, took place at the Jardines de México park in Jojutla, Morelos on October 25, 2014. In Miss Universe she placed in the top fifteen.

== Notes ==
On June 29, 2015, Televisa and the Nuestra Belleza Mexico Organization decided to cut ties to Donald Trump, who was then a part-owner of the Miss Universe Organization, and thus pulled out Mexico's delegate from participating in the Miss Universe 2015 pageant. At this point the Nuestra Belleza Mexico Organization was examining the possibility of sending Wendy to the Miss World 2015 Competition. This was due to the controversial remarks the American business magnate made about Mexican immigrants during his presidential candidacy speech on June 16.

However, in September the same year, Trump bought NBC's stock of the Miss Universe Organization - briefly becoming its sole owner - only to sell it entirely to WME/IMG. With new owners behind the company and more importantly, Trump being out of the picture, it was eventually decided that Mexico would return to Miss Universe and Wendolly was sent to compete.

Awards and achievements
Preceded by (Baja California Sur) Josselyn Garciglia	Nuestra Belleza México; 2014	Succeeded by (Tamaulipas) Kristal Silva
Preceded by Vianey Vázquez	Nuestra Belleza Aguascalientes; 2014	Succeeded by María Gabriela Bonilla
