= Nuestra Belleza Aguascalientes 2012 =

Mexican beauty pageant

- Date: July 19, 2012
- Presenters: América Magaña, Jaidar Fernández
- Entertainment: Río Roma
- Venue: Antiguo Taller de Locomotoras, Aguascalientes, Aguascalientes
- Broadcaster: Televisa
- Entrants: 8
- Placements: 4
- Winner: Jessica Amor; Aguascalientes City

Nuestra Belleza Aguascalientes 2012 was held at the Antiguo Taller de Locomotoras, Aguascalientes, Aguascalientes on July 19, 2012. At the conclusion of the final night of competition Jessica Amor of Aguascalientes City was crowned the winner. Amor was crowned by outgoing Nuestra Belleza Aguascalientes and Nuestra Belleza México titleholder Karina González. Eight contestants competed for the title.

== Results ==
=== Placements ===
Final results	Contestant
Nuestra Belleza Aguascalientes 2012	Jessica Amor
Suplente / 1st Runner-up	Vianey Vázquez
2nd Runner-up	Lenny Loza
3rd Runner-up	Mariana González

== Contestants ==
Hometown	Contestant
Aguascalientes	Adriana del Rocío Pérez González
Aguascalientes	Ana Sofía Jiménez Martínez
Aguascalientes	Mariana Guadalupe Ávila González
Aguascalientes	Jessica Amor Mendoza
Aguascalientes	Issa Denis García Acero
Aguascalientes	Vianey del Rosario Vázquez Ramírez
Aguascalientes	Leny Anette Loza Padilla
Aguascalientes	Silvia Janeth Pérez Pedroza
