= Nuestra Belleza Guanajuato 2010 =

- Date: July 23, 2010
- Presenters: Andrea Martínez de Velasco, Juan José Origel
- Venue: Auditorio Municipal Mariano Abasolo Dolores Hidalgo, Guanajuato
- Broadcaster: Televisa
- Entrants: 10
- Placements: 4
- Winner: Helena Baca

Nuestra Belleza Guanajuato 2010, was held at the Auditorio Municipal Mariano Abasolo Dolores Hidalgo, Guanajuato, Mexico on July 23, 2010. At the conclusion of the final night of competition, Helena Baca of León was crowned the winner. Baca was crowned by outgoing Nuestra Belleza Guanajuato titleholder, Clementina Velázquez. Ten contestants competed for the state title.

"Helena Baca" triumph was discussed for several reasons, among them that she is not from León but from Lagos de Moreno Jalisco

== Results ==
=== Placements ===
Final Results	Contestant
Nuestra Belleza Guanajuato 2010	Helena Baca
Suplente / 1st Runner-up	Kisaí Vázquez
2nd Runner-up	Maritza Soto
3rd Runner-up	Alejandra Ramírez

=== Special awards ===
Award	Contestant
Miss Photogenic	Kisaí Vázquez
Miss Congeniality	Maritza Soto
Sexy Walk - Best Legs	Maritza Soto

== Judges ==
- Rubí Valdez - Nuestra Belleza Guanajuato 2003
- Fernanda Verdín - Nuestra Belleza Guanajuato 2005
- Ofelia Correa - Regional Coordinator of Nuestra Belleza México
- Luis Mario Santoscoy - National Director of Televisa Spectacles.
- Norma Verdín - Fashion Designer

== Background Music ==
- Varana

== Contestants ==
Hometown	Conestant
Irapuato	Aura Zavala Durán
Irapuato	Maricarmen Vela
León	Alejandra Ramírez
León	Helena Estefanía Baca Anaya
León	Lourdes Lilianne Aranda
León	Mariana Vianney Flore
León	Mónica Ivette González Rodríguez
Uriangato	Maritza Soto Cervantes
Irapuato	Maricarmen Vela
Valle de Santiago	Alejandra Arredondo
