= Miss Aguascalientes =

- Formation: 2016
- Type: Beauty Pageant
- Headquarters: Aguascalientes City
- Location: Mexico
- Local Coordinator: Ivonne Hernández; Alberto Vega

Miss Aguascalientes is a state-level contest in the state of Aguascalientes, Mexico, which selects the state representative for the national contest Miss México, thus aspiring to represent the country internationally on one of the platforms offered.

The state organization has achieved the following results since 2016:

- Top 10/11: 1 (2017)
- Top 16: 1 (2016)
- Unplaced: 5 (2018, 2020, 2021, 2023, 2025)

== National Queens ==
- Elizabeth de Alba - Miss México Top Model of the World 2019 (Designated)

== Titleholders ==
The following are the names of the annual winners of Miss Aguascalientes, listed in ascending order, as well as their results during the national Miss México pageant. State queens who represented the country in a current or past franchise of the national organization are also highlighted in a specific color.

Current Franchises:

- Competed at Miss World.
- Competed at Miss Supranational.
- Competed at Miss Cosmo.
- Competed at Miss Elite.
- Competed at Top Model of the World.
- Competed at Reina Internacional del Café.
- Competed at Reina Mundial del Banano.
- Competed at Miss Continentes Unidos.
- Competed at Miss Global City.

Former Franchises:

- Competed at Miss Grand International.
- Competed at Miss Costa Maya International.

Year	Titleholder	Hometown	Placement	Special Award	Notes
2027	Litzy Loya	Aguascalientes	TBD		
2026	Guadalupe Nayeli Reyes Jiménez	Aguascalientes	TBD		1st Runner-up at Miss Teen International México 2024; Miss Teen International Aguascalientes 2024; Competed at Reina de la Feria Nacional de San Marcos 2025; Miss Universidad Cuauhtémoc 2024; Reina de la Feria del Maguey 2023
2025	María Fernanda Hernández Ramírez	Aguascalientes	-	-	2nd Runner-up at Miss México Cosmo 2025
2024	Due to changes in the dates of the national pageant, the election of the state queens was postponed for this year.				
2023	Jaqueline Salas Sánchez	Aguascalientes	-	Miss Talent	Top 10 at Miss México Supranational 2025
2022	Due to changes in the dates of the national pageant, the election of the state queens was postponed for this year.				
2021	María Guadalupe Gutiérrez Gallegos	Aguascalientes	-	-	-
2020	Frida Swain Reyes	Aguascalientes	-	-	Top 16 at Miss México Elite 2022; 2nd Runner-up at Miss Aguascalientes 2019
2019	Ximena Luna Hita †	Aguascalientes	Did not Compete	-	Died on January 1st, 2021
2018	Elizabeth de Alba Ruvalcaba	Aguascalientes	-	-	Mexicana Universal Aguascalientes 2023; 2nd Runner-up at Miss México Grand 2020; Top 15 at Top Model of the World 2019; Miss México Top Model of the World 2019; 3rd Runner-up at Miss México Grand 2019
2017	Paula Bernal Martínez	Aguascalientes	Top 10	Miss Photogenic	Competed at Nuestra Belleza Aguascalientes 2016
2016	Giovanna Alfieri González	Aguascalientes	Top 16	-	Reina de la Feria Nacional de San Marcos 2016; 1st Runner-up at Nuestra Belleza Aguascalientes 2015; First Mexican-italian born in Aguascalientes

== See also ==
- Mexicana Universal Aguascalientes
