= Miss Coahuila =

Beauty pageant

- Formation: 2016
- Type: Beauty Pageant
- Headquarters: Monterrey
- Location: Mexico
- Local Coordinator: José Antonio Escobedo

Miss Coahuila is a state-level contest in the state of Coahuila, Mexico, which selects the state representative for the national contest Miss México, thus aspiring to represent the country internationally on one of the platforms offered.

The state organization has achieved the following results since 2016:

- Winner: (2025)
- Top 5/6: 1 (2019)
- Top 16: 1 (2023)
- Unplaced: 1 (2016, 2017, 2018, 2021)

== National Queens ==
- Frida Reynoso - Miss México Top Model of the World 2026

== Titleholders ==
The following are the names of the annual winners of Miss Coahuila, listed in ascending order, as well as their results during the national Miss México pageant. State queens who represented the country in a current or past franchise of the national organization are also highlighted in a specific color.

Current Franchises:

- Competed at Miss World.
- Competed at Miss Supranational.
- Competed at Miss Cosmo.
- Competed at Miss Elite.
- Competed at Top Model of the World.
- Competed at Reina Internacional del Café.
- Competed at Reina Mundial del Banano.
- Competed at Miss Continentes Unidos.
- Competed at Miss Global City.

Former Franchises:

- Competed at Miss Grand International.
- Competed at Miss Costa Maya International.

Year	Titleholder	Hometown	Placement	Special Award	Notes
2026	Alejandra Reyes	Saltillo	TBD		
2025	Frida Elizabeth Reynoso Rivas	Piedras Negras	Miss México; Top Model of the World	-	Top 12 at Miss México Cosmo 2025; 2nd Runner-up at Miss Grand México 2023; Miss Grand Coahuila 2023; Competed at Mexicana Universal 2022; Mexicana Universal Coahuila 2021; Competed at Embajadora México 2021; Embajadora Coahuila 2021; 1st Runner-up at Mexicana Universal Coahuila 2017
2024	Due to changes in the dates of the national pageant, the election of the state queens was postponed for this year.				
2023	Karen Ferreira Martínez	Cuatro Ciénegas	Top 16	-	Competed at Miss Universe México 2025; Miss Universe Coahuila 2025; Top 16 at Miss México Top Model of the World 2024; First Mexican-brazilian born in Coahuila
2022	Due to changes in the dates of the national pageant, the election of the state queens was postponed for this year.				
2021	Sofía de Anda	Monterrey	-	-	4th Runner-up at Miss México Supranational 2023; Top 5 at Miss Nuevo León 2019; Top 5 at Miss Earth Nuevo León 2016; Was born and raised in Nuevo León
2020	Andrea Michelle Mayer Esquivel (Resigned)	San Buenaventura	-	-	-
2019	Ilse Georgina Acosta Vargas	Saltillo	Top 6	-	Miss Multiverse México 2022; Miss Multiverse México 2019; Competed at Miss Model of the World México 2019; Competed at Miss Nuevo León 2016; Competed at Miss Earth México 2013; Miss Earth Nuevo León 2013
2018	Poleth Urbina Alvarado	Matamoros	-	-	Competed at Miss Coahuila 2017
2017	Karla Gabriela Campbell Zetina	Saltillo	-	-	-
2016	Liliana Rodríguez Saucedo	Ramos Arizpe	-	-	2nd Runner-up at Embajadora Mundial del Turismo 2015; Top 16 at Miss Earth México 2014; Miss Earth Coahuila 2014; Competed at Nuestra Belleza Coahuila 2014

== See also ==
- Mexicana Universal Coahuila
