= Miss Guanajuato =

State-level contest in Guanajuato, Mexico

- Formation: 2016
- Type: Beauty Pageant
- Headquarters: Guadalajara
- Location: Mexico
- Local Coordinator: Ernesto García

Miss Guanajuato is a state-level contest in the state of Guanajuato, Mexico, which selects the state representative for the national contest Miss México, thus aspiring to represent the country internationally on one of the platforms offered.

The state organization has achieved the following results since 2016:

- Top 16: 2 (2018, 2021)
- Unplaced: 3 (2017, 2019, 2023, 2025)
- Absences: 1 (2016)

== Titleholders ==
The following are the names of the annual winners of Miss Guanajuato, listed in ascending order, as well as their results during the national Miss México pageant. State queens who represented the country in a current or past franchise of the national organization are also highlighted in a specific color.

Current Franchises:

- Competed at Miss World.
- Competed at Miss Supranational.
- Competed at Miss Cosmo.
- Competed at Miss Elite.
- Competed at Top Model of the World.
- Competed at Reina Internacional del Café.
- Competed at Reina Mundial del Banano.
- Competed at Miss Continentes Unidos.
- Competed at Miss Global City.

Former Franchises:

- Competed at Miss Grand International.
- Competed at Miss Costa Maya International.

Year	Titleholder	Hometown	Placement	Special Award	Notes
2026	Monserrath Castañeda Ramos	Guanajuato	TBD		
2025	Ximena Monserrat Valdovinos Garnica	Celaya	-	-	-
2024	Due to changes in the dates of the national pageant, the election of the state queens was postponed for this year.				
2023	Karen Gisela Ortiz Torres	León	-	-	Competed at Miss Guanajuato 2019
2022	Due to changes in the dates of the national pageant, the election of the state queens was postponed for this year.				
2021	Blanca Janetzy Cuevas Rodríguez	Silao	Top 16	-	Top 12 at Mexicana Universal 2026; Mexicana Universal Estado de México 2025; 1st Runner-up at Miss México Elite 2023
2020	Due to the contingency of COVID-19 there was a lag in the year of the state contest				
2019	Georgina Mariana Villanueva Rodríguez	San Miguel de Allende	-	-	Competed at Miss México Elite 2022
2018	Nuria Andrea Fuentes Salazar	León	Top 16	Miss Sports	-
2017	Angélica Hernández López	León	-	-	4th Runner-up at Miss Model of the World 2019; Miss Model of the World México 2019
2016	Renata Aguirre Padilla (Withdrawal)	León	Did not Compete	-	Top 8 at Miss México Grand 2017

== See also ==
- Mexicana Universal Guanajuato
