= Nuestra Belleza Baja California Sur 2011 =

- Date: June 25, 2011
- Presenters: Vielka Valenzuela
- Venue: Hotel Presidente Intercontinental, Loas Cabos, Baja California Sur
- Broadcaster: Televisa
- Entrants: 8
- Placements: 4
- Winner: Jessica García Formenti; La Paz

Nuestra Belleza Baja California Sur 2011, was a pageant held at the Hotel Presidente Intercontinental in Loas Cabos, Baja California Sur on June 25, 2011. At the conclusion of the final night of competition Jessica García Formenti of La Paz was crowned the winner. García was crowned by outgoing Nuestra Belleza Baja California Sur and Nuestra Belleza Internacional México 2011 Karen Higuera. Eight contestants competed for the title.

== Results ==
=== Placements ===
Final results	Contestant
Nuestra Belleza Baja California Sur 2011	Jessica García Formenti
Suplente / 1st Runner-up	Hassel López
2nd Runner-up	Jessica Ascencio
3rd Runner-up	Andrea Bertin

=== Special awards ===
Award	Contestant
Miss Photogenic	Isabel Alvarado
Miss Congeniality	Nancy Caballero
Miss Elegance	Jessica García Formenti
Best Body	Andrea Bertín

== Contestants ==
Hometown	Contestant	Height (m)
Cabo San Lucas	Nancy Caballero	1.73
Caduaño	Isabel Álvarado	1.72
Comondú	Yessica Ascencio Cisneros	1.78
El Triunfo	Diana Hirales	1.77
La Paz	Jessica García Formenti	1.78
La Rivera	Andrea Karina Bertin	1.74
San José del Cabo	Hassel López	1.76
Todos los Santos	Zoideth Guido	1.70
