= Mexicana Universal Jalisco =

Annual beauty contest in Mexico

- Formation: 1994 (as Nuestra Belleza Jalisco); 2017 (as Mexicana Universal Jalisco)
- Type: Beauty pageant
- Headquarters: Guadalajara
- Location: Mexico
- Local Coordinator: Julio Munguía

Mexicana Universal Jalisco (until 2016 called Nuestra Belleza Jalisco) is a state-level contest in the state of Jalisco, Mexico, which selects the state representative for the national contest Mexicana Universal (formerly called Nuestra Belleza México), thus aspiring to represent the country internationally on one of the platforms offered.

The state organization has achieved the following results since 1994:

- Winner: 7 (1996, 2000, 2008, 2009, 2010, 2018, 2023)
- 1st Runner-up: 4 (2006, 2007, 2014, 2025)
- 2nd Runner-up: 4 (2004, 2005, 2007, 2014)
- 3rd Runner-up: 4 (2009, 2011, 2012, 2013)
- 4th Runner-up: 2 (2017, 2022)
- Top 5/6: 2 (1994, 2016)
- Top 10/11/12: 6 (1998, 2001, 2010, 2012, 2015, 2016)
- Top 15/16: 5 (1995, 1997, 2006, 2019, 2021)
- Top 20/21: 3 (2001, 2003, 2004)
- Unplaced: 1 (2002)

== National Queens ==
- Natalia Garibay - Mexicana Internacional 2025
- Sofía Aragón - Mexicana Universal 2019
- Nebai Torres - Mexicana Internacional 2018 (Designated)
- Karin Ontiveros - Nuestra Belleza México 2010
- Ximena Navarrete - Nuestra Belleza México 2009
- Karla Carrillo - Nuestra Belleza México 2008
- Lupita González - Miss Continente Americano México 2008 (Designated)
- Gladys Castellanos - Miss Continente Americano México 2007 (Designated)
- Jacqueline Bracamontes - Nuestra Belleza México 2000
- Yessica Salazar - Nuestra Belleza Mundo México 1996

== International Queens ==
- Ximena Navarrete - Miss Universe 2010
- Lupita González - Miss Continente Americano 2008

== Titleholders ==
The following are the names of the annual winners of Mexicana Universal Jalisco, listed in ascending order, as well as their results during the national Mexicana Universal pageant. State queens who represented the country in a current or past franchise of the national organization are also highlighted in a specific color.

Current Franchises:

- Competed at Miss Grand International.
- Competed at Miss International.
- Competed at Miss Charm.
- Competed at Reina Hispanoamericana.
- Competed at Miss Orb International.
- Competed at Nuestra Latinoamericana Universal.

Former Franchises:

- Competed at Miss Universe.
- Competed at Miss World.
- Competed at Miss Continente Americano.
- Competed at Miss Costa Maya International.
- Competed at Miss Atlántico Internacional.
- Competed at Miss Verano Viña del Mar.
- Competed at Reina Internacional del Café.
- Competed at Reina Internacional de las Flores.
- Competed at Señorita Continente Americano.
- Competed at Nuestra Belleza Internacional.

Year	Titleholder	Hometown	Placement	Special Award	Notes
1994	Luz Elena González de la Torre	Guadalajara	Top 6	-	-
1995	Tania Prado Laursen	Zapopan	Top 16	-	-
1996	Yessica Salazar González	La Barca	Nuestra Belleza Mundo México	-	Top 10 at Miss World 1996; Top 16 at Nuestra Belleza México 1996
1997	Tatiana Eileen Ruvalcaba Della Roca	Yahualica de González Gallo	Top 16	-	-
1998	Gloria Alejandra Morales Macias	Zapopan	Top 10	-	-
1999	María Pía Marín Gutiérrez	Encarnación de Díaz	-	-	Competed at Nuestra Belleza Jalisco 1997; 1st Runner-up at Señorita Turismo Región de los Altos 1996; Sñorita. Encarnación de Díaz 1996; Reina de las Fiestas Patronales de Nuestra Señora de la Encarnación 1996; Embajadora de las Fiestas Patrias 1995
2000	Jacqueline Bracamontes Van Hoorde	Guadalajara	Nuestra Belleza México	Miss St. Ives; Best Skin	Competed at Miss Universe 2001; Won the Nuestra Belleza Mundo México 2000 crown, however, she also won the Nuestra Belleza México crown, so she had to give up going to Miss World.; First Mexican-belgian born in Jalisco
2001	Miriam de Jesús Ayala Núñez	San Miguel el Alto	Top 20	-	Top 21 at Nuestra Belleza Mundo México 2001
2002	Beatriz García Barragán	Guadalajara	-	-	-
2003	Ariadna Itzel Muro Esquivel	Zapopan	Top 20	-	Top 10 at Miss Universe México 2024; Miss Universe Comunidad Internacional 2024; Runner-up at Miss Universo Italia Región Veneto; Miss Woman Beauty 2023; Miss Woman Beauty México 2023
2004	Joanna Rivera Sibson	Zapopan	Top 20	-	-
2005	Karina López Pérez	Jalostotitlán	-	-	Señorita Turismo Región de Los Altos 2004; Señorita Jalostotitlán 2004
2006	Gladys Castellanos Jiménez	Guadalajara	1st Runner-up	Miss Talent; Steps to Fame; Best National Costume	2nd Runner-up at Miss Continente Americano 2007; Miss Continente Americano México 2007
2007	María Guadalupe González Gallegos	Tepatitlán	1st Runner-up	Best Hair; The Queens Choice	Miss Continente Americano 2008; Miss Continente Americano México 2008; Señorita Turismo Región de Los Altos 2005; Señorita Tepatitlán 2005
2008	Mayra González Vázquez	Guadalajara	Assumed the state title when Karla Carrillo won Nuestra Belleza Mundo México 2009; 1st Runner-up at Nuestra Belleza Jalisco 2008		
2008	Karla María Carrillo González	Guadalajara	Nuestra Belleza México	Fuller Beuaty Queen	1st Runner-up at Miss Continente Americano 2010; Miss Continente Americano México 2010; Competed at Miss Universe 2009
2009	Janeth Pérez Palencia	Zapopan	Assumed the state title when Ximena Navarrete won Nuestra Belleza Mundo México 2009; 1st Runner-up at Nuestra Belleza Jalisco 2009		
2009	Ximena Navarrete Rosete	Guadalajara	Nuestra Belleza México	Academic Award; Fuller Beauty Queen	Miss Universe 2010
2010	Maria de Jesús Padilla Romo	Jalostotitlán	Assumed the state title when Karin Ontiveros won Nuestra Belleza Mundo México 2010; 1st Runner-up at Nuestra Belleza Jalisco 2010		
2010	Karin Cecilia Ontiveros Meza	Amatitán	Nuestra Belleza Mexico	Miss Talent; Steps to Fame	Competed at Miss Universe 2011
2011	Lucía Silva González	Puerto Vallarta	3rd Runner-up	Miss Top Model; Personality Fraiche	Competed at Miss F1 México 2015
2012	Ana Karen Siordia Velasco	Guadalajara	Top 10	-	Competed at Miss F1 México 2015
2013	Paola Nereyda Sánchez Corona	Guadalajara	3rd Runner-up	Miss Top Model	Competed at Miss F1 México 2015
2014	Alessa Bravo Agredano	Guadalajara	2nd Runner-up	Steps to Fame	1st Runner-up at Nuestra Belleza Mundo México 2014; Top3 at Mexico's Next Top Model 2012
2015	Mariana Franco Anguiano	Tonalá	Top 10	-	-
2016	Adriana Mardueño Villaseñor	Autlán	Top 10	-	-
Until 2016 the Title was Nuestra Belleza Jalisco
2017	Nebai Torres Camarena	Guadalajara	4th Runner-up	Fuller Cosmetics Face	Top 15 at Miss International 2018; Mexicana Internacional 2018; 4th Runner-up at Mexico's Next Top Model 2014
2018	Sofía Montserrat Aragón Torres (Assumed)	Zapopan	Mexicana Universal	Best in Evening Gown	2nd Runner-up at Miss Universe 2019; 2nd Runner-up at Mexicana Universal Jalisco 2018; 2nd Runner-up at Miss Jalisco 2017
2018	Dorothy Nathaly Sutherland Barragán (Dismissed)	Puerto Vallarta	Did not Compete	-	First Mexican-american born in Jalisco
2019	Michel López Sosa	Guadalajara	Top 15	-	1st Runner-up at Mexicana Universal Jalisco 2018
2020	In 2020, due to the contingency of COVID-19 there was a lag in the year of the state contest				
2021	María Guadalupe Vargas Naranjo	Zapopan	Top 16	-	Will compete at Miss Universe 2026; Miss Universe Mexico 2026; Miss Universe Jalisco 2026; Top 5 at Miss Jalisco 2018
2022	María José de la Torre Cerda (Assumed after national competition)	Atotonilco El Alto	4th Runner-up	-	1st Runner-up at Mexicana Universal Jalisco 2022; 1st Runner-up at Señorita Turismo Región de los Altos 2015; Señorita Atotonilco el Alto 2014
2022	Cristina Villegas Murillo (Resinged after national competition)	Zapopan	-	-	Top 10 at Miss Universe México 2024; Miss Universe Jalisco 2024; Miss Intercontinental North America 2023; 1st Runner-up at Miss Intercontinental 2023; Miss Intercontinental México 2023
2023	Natalia Garibay Valencia (Assumed)	Puerto Vallarta	Mexicana Internacional	Best National Costume	Top 20 at Miss International 2025
2023	Gabriela Viridiana Reyes Vital (Resigned)	Arandas	Did not Compete	-	Competed at Miss Mesoamérica Universe 2018; Miss Mesoamérica Universe México 2018
2024	In 2024, due to changes in the dates of the national pageant, the election of the state queens was postponed for one year.				
2025	Karen Gabriela Yanes González	Zapopan	1st Runner-up	-	-

== Designated Contestants ==
Starting in 2000, states were allowed to have more than one candidate, as some states were not sending candidates for various reasons. The following contestants from Jalisco were invited to compete in the national pageant alongside the reigning queen, and in some cases, they achieved even better results.

Year	Titleholder	Hometown	Placement	Special Award	Notes
2000	Libertad Godínez Herrera	Zapopan	-	Best Skin	1st Runner-up at Nuestra Belleza Jalisco 2000
2001	Ana Inés Santoyo Jasso	Guadalajara	Top 10	-	Top 21 en Nuestra Belleza Mundo México 2001; Top 3 at Nuestra Belleza Jalisco 2001
2001	Ana Inés Santoyo Jasso	Guadalajara	Top 10	-	Top 21 en Nuestra Belleza Mundo México 2001; Top 3 at Nuestra Belleza Jalisco 2001
2001	Sarahi Alejandra Álvarez Negrete	Guadalajara	Top 20	-	Top 21 en Nuestra Belleza Mundo México 2001; Top 3 at Nuestra Belleza Jalisco 2001
2002	Cecilia de Jesús Gutiérrez Avilés	Guadalajara	-	-	Señora México Internacional 2021; Señora Jalisco 2021; 1st Runner-up at Nuestra Belleza Jalisco 2002
2003	Paola Topete Vela	Guadalajara	-	-	2nd Runner-up at Nuestra Belleza Jalisco 2000
2003	Gladys Anaya Martín	San Miguel el Alto	-	-	1st Runner-up at Nuestra Belleza Jalisco 2000; 1st Runner-up at Señorita Turismo Región de los Altos 2000; Señorita San Miguel el Alto 2000
2004	Gabriela Vázquez Patrón	Guadalajara	2nd Runner-up	-	1st Runner-up at Nuestra Belleza Jalisco 2004
2005	Ana Paola Sifuentes Gutiérrez	Guadalajara	2bd Runner-up	-	1st Runner-up at Nuestra Belleza Jalisco 2005
2006	Perla Lizbeth Mercado Barajas	Guadalajara	Top 15	-	Top 5 at Nuestra Belleza Jalisco 2006
2007	María Esmeralda Pimentel Murguía	Ciudad Guzmán	2nd Runner-up	-	Top 5 at Nuestra Belleza Jalisco 2007
2009	Sandra Luz Vargas Plazola	Puerto Vallarta	3rd Runner-up	-	Top 5 at Nuestra Belleza Jalisco 2009
2010	Eunice Guadalupe Sánchez Valencia	Guadalajara	Top 10	-	Top 10 at World Miss University 2010; Miss Mundo Universidad México 2010; Top 5 at Nuestra Belleza Jalisco 2010
2012	Jacqueline Ivonne Sauza Ávila	Guadalajara	3rd Runner-up	-	Top 5 at Nuestra Belleza Mundo México 2012; Designated Nuestra Belleza Jalisco Virtual 2012; Runner-up virtual casting Nuestra Belleza México 2012
2013	Rocío Hernández Zamudio	San Ignacio Cerro Gordo	-	Best National Costume	Top 5 at Nuestra Belleza Jalisco 2013
2014	Karina Stephania Martin Jímenez	Tonalá	1st Runner-up	The Queens Choice; Personality Fraiche	4th Runner-up at Miss Supranational 2015; Miss Supranational México 2015; Competed at Miss F1 México 2015; World Miss University North America 2014; World Miss University 2014; Miss Mundo Universidad México 2014
2016	Ángela Goretti Robles Ibarra	Guadalajara	Top 5	-	1st Runner-up at Miss Model of the World 2017; Miss Model of the World México 2017; 1st Runner-up at Nuestra Belleza Jalisco 2016; Competed at Miss F1 México 2015; 1st Runner-up at Nuestra Belleza Jalisco 2015
2021	Priscila Franco Franco	Tepatitlán	Top 16	-	3rd Runner-up at Miss Grand Mexico 2023; Miss Grand Jalisco 2023; 2nd Runner-up at Mexicana Universal Jalisco 2021; Competed at Señorita Turismo Región de los Altos 2018; Señorita Tepatitlán 2018
