= Nuestra Belleza Aguascalientes 2010 =

- Date: July 30, 2010
- Venue: Teatro Víctor Sandoval, Aguascalientes, Aguascalientes
- Broadcaster: Televisa Aguascalientes
- Entrants: 7
- Placements: 7
- Winner: Estefanía Herrera

Nuestra Belleza Aguascalientes 2010, was held at the Teatro Víctor Sandoval in Aguascalientes, Aguascalientes on July 30, 2010. At the conclusion of the final night of competition, Estefanía Herrera of the capital city Aguascalientes was crowned the winner. Herrera was crowned by outgoing Nuestra Belleza Aguascalientes titleholder, Abigail González. Seven contestants competed for the state title.

== Results ==
=== Placements ===
| Final results | Contestant |
|---|---|
| Nuestra Belleza Aguascalientes 2010 | Estefanía Herrera |
| Suplente / 1st Runner-up | Gabriela Palacio |
| 2nd Runner-up | Lucía Valdez |
| 3rd Runner-up | Viridiana Díaz |
| 4th Runner-up | Karen Silva |
| 5th Runner-up | Caridad Escotto |
| 6th Runner-up | Alejandra Breceda |

== Contestants ==
| Hometown | Contestant |
|---|---|
| Aguascalientes | Alejandra Breceda de Lara |
| Aguascalientes | Caridad Escotto Rul |
| Aguascalientes | Estefanía Herrera García |
| Aguascalientes | Gabriela Palacio Díaz de León |
| Calvillo | Karen Silva Loera |
| Aguascalientes | Lucía Valdez Proa |
| Aguascalientes | Viridiana Díaz Cahue |
