= Nuestra Belleza Nuevo León 2010 =

- Date: July 20, 2010
- Presenters: Anagabriela Espinoza, René Strickler
- Venue: Teatro de la Ciudad, Monterrey, Nuevo León
- Broadcaster: Televisa
- Entrants: 10
- Placements: 5
- Winner: Cynthia de la Vega; San Pedro Garza García

Nuestra Belleza Nuevo León 2010, was held at the Teatro de la Ciudad in Monterrey, Nuevo León on July 20, 2010. At the conclusion of the final night of competition, Cynthia de la Vega of San Pedro Garza García was crowned the winner. De la Vega was crowned by outgoing Nuestra Belleza Nuevo León titleholder, Adriana Treviño. Ten contestants competed for the state title.

The pageant was hosted by Nuestra Belleza Nuevo León 2007 and Miss International 2009 Anagabriela Espinoza and René Strickler.

== Results ==
=== Placements ===
Final results	Contestant
Nuestra Belleza Nuevo León 2010	San Pedro - Cynthia de la Vega
Suplente / 1st Runner-up	San Pedro - Ivanna Rodríguez
2nd Runner-up	Monterrey - Ana Guerra
3rd Runner-up	Monterrey - Brenda Solís
4th Runner-up	Monterrey - Daniela Ramos

=== Special awards ===
Award	Contestant
Miss Photogenic	Ivanna Rodríguez
Miss Elegance	Ana Guerra
Best Smile	María Fernanda Villaseñor

== Judges ==
- Elsa Burgos - Miss Costa Maya International 2002 & Television Hostess
- Patricio Cabezut - Television Host
- Karla Jiménez - Nuestra Belleza Mundo México 2005
- Mariana Lombard - Nuestra Belleza Nuevo León 2006
- Jorge Torales - Doctor
- Dolores Ávalos - Actress
- Tity González - Fashion Designer
- Arturo Carmona - Actor
- Ana Laura Corral - National Coordinator of Nuestra Belleza México

== Background Music ==
- Ballet Folclórico Magisterial
- Pablo Montero
- Kika Edgar
- Myrza Maldonado
- María Garza

== Contestants ==
Hometown	Contestant	Age	Height (m)
Monterrey	Ana Alejandra Guerra González	23	1.72
Monterrey	Ana Laura Macías Ponce	23	1.70
Monterrey	Brenda Daniela Solís Villarreal	22	1.74
Monterrey	Daniela Ramos Machado	22	1.75
Monterrey	Elida Garza Salinas	22	1.72
Monterrey	Yaresi Leticia García Tamez	18	1.75
San Nicolás	María Fernanda Villaseñor Múzquiz	20	1.80
San Pedro	Cynthia Alejandra de la Vega Oates	18	1.80
San Pedro	Ivanna Alejandra Rodríguez Ramos	19	1.70
Santa Catarina	Sandy Thalía Martínez González	19	1.70
