= Nuestra Belleza Coahuila 2010 =

- Date: July 30, 2010
- Presenters: Marisol González, Leonardo de Lozanne
- Venue: Teatro Nazas, Torreón, Coahuila
- Broadcaster: Televisa
- Entrants: 10
- Placements: 3
- Winner: Cecilia Flores

Nuestra Belleza Coahuila 2010, was held at the Teatro Nazas in Torreón, Coahuila on July 30, 2010. At the conclusion of the final night of competition, Cecilia Flores of Torreón was crowned the winner. Flores was crowned by outgoing Nuestra Belleza Coahuila titleholder, Abril Rodríguez. Ten contestants competed for the state title.

== Results ==
=== Placements ===
Final results	Contestant
Nuestra Belleza Coahuila 2010	Cecilia Flores
Suplente / 1st Runner-up	Elisa Villarreal
2nd Runner-up	Diana Ávila

=== Special awards ===
Award	Contestant
Miss Congeniality	Elisa Villarreal
Best Face	Jacqueline Chretin
Best Body	Angelike Haro

== Judges ==
- Javier Ruíz
- Perla Beltrán - Nuestra Belleza Mundo México 2008
- René Strickler - Actor
- Héctor Javier Pérez
- Abril Cervera
- Ana Laura Corral - National Coordinator of Nuestra Belleza México

== Background Music ==
- Jot Dog

== Contestants ==
Hometown	Contestant	Age
Monclova	Elisa María Villarreal Hernández	18
Piedras Negras	Abril Alejandra Juárez Ibarra	23
Piedras Negras	Barbara Janeth Villarreal Ochoa	18
Saltillo	Angelike Haro Martínez	23
Saltillo	Gloria Estefanía Elizondo Carrillo	18
Torreón	Betsy Richell Reuss	23
Torreón	Cecilia Flores Nogueira	22
Torreón	Diana Eloisa Ávila Ibarra	22
Torreón	Jacqueline Chretin Shepard	21
Torreón	Maribel Avendaño Peza	22
