= Karina González =

Mexican TV host and model (born 1991)

- Born: Laura Karina González Muñoz; March 28, 1991 (age 35); Aguascalientes City, Aguascalientes, Mexico
- Height: 5 ft 9 in (1.75 m)
- Beauty pageant titleholder
- Title: Nuestra Belleza México 2011
- Hair color: Brown
- Eye color: Brown
- Major competitions: Nuestra Belleza Aguascalientes 2011 (Winner); Nuestra Belleza México 2011 (Winner); Miss Universe 2012 (Top 10)

Laura Karina González Muñoz (born March 28, 1991) is a Mexican TV host, model, and beauty pageant titleholder who won Nuestra Belleza México 2011. she represented Mexico at Miss Universe 2012 in Las Vegas and placed in the Top 10.

== Pageantry ==
González was crowned Nuestra Belleza Aguascalientes the night of July 7, 2011, and subsequently represented her state in the national competition, held in Puerto Vallarta, Jalisco, where she competed against thirty-four young women from all over the country. González became the first Nuestra Belleza México winner from Aguascalientes on August 20, 2011. She was crowned by the outgoing national titleholder Karin Ontiveros, and Miss Universe 2010 Ximena Navarrete.

== Miss Universe 2012 ==
Gonzalez represented Mexico at the Miss Universe 2012 competition. She was one of the favorite prior to the coronation night. She placed in the Top 10, wearing a resplendent red evening gown with generous slit and went to second place in the national costume competition. The design of the gown she wore was reminiscent of what Miss Universe 2010 and fellow Mexican Ximena Navarrete wore when she was crowned, incidentally, in Las Vegas, Nevada.

Awards and achievements
Preceded by (Jalisco) Karin Ontiveros	Nuestra Belleza México; 2011	Succeeded by (Nuevo León) Cynthia Duque
Preceded by Estefanía Herrera	Nuestra Belleza Aguascalientes; 2011	Succeeded by Jéssica Amor
