= Miss Earth México 2011 =

Tenth annual beauty pageant of Miss Earth México

- Date: September 17, 2011
- Presenters: Ninel Conde; Raúl Osorio
- Entertainment: Reyli Barba
- Venue: Centro de convenciones Chetumal, Quintana Roo
- Entrants: 32
- Placements: 17
- Winner: Casandra Ananké; Distrito Federal

Miss Earth México 2011 was the 10th Miss Earth México pageant, held at the Chetumal in Quintana Roo, Mexico, on September 17, 2011.

Claudia Mollinedo of Tabasco crowned Casandra Ananké Becerra Vázquez of Distrito Federal as her successor at the end of the event. Bacerra represented Mexico in Miss Earth 2011 held in Quezon City, Philippines. She placed in Top 8 and won special award Best in Evening Gown.

== Results ==
=== Placements ===
Placement	Contestant
Miss Earth México 2011	Distrito Federal – Casandra Ananké
Miss Air	Tabasco – Yusihey Vidal
Miss Water	Oaxaca – Alejandra Sandoval
Miss Fire	Sinaloa – Ivonne Beltrán
Top 8	Baja California Sur – Rocio Castro; Jalisco – Verónica García; Nayarit – Priscila Zarate; Veracruz – Nayeli Garcia
Top 17	Chihuahua – Ana Karen Navar; Coahuila – Edni Basso; Guanajuato – Lourdes Aranda; Guerrero – Adriana Cuevas; Puebla – María Nava; Quintana Roo – Ivana Saldívar; Tamaulipas – Iraim Hernández; Tlaxcala – Jennifer Soto; Zacatecas – Roxana Reyes

=== Special awards ===
Award	Contestant
Miss Photogenic	Sinaloa – Ivonne Beltran Medina
Miss Congeniality	Hidalgo – Michelle Ramos Abarca
Miss Internet	Michoacán – Guadalupe Hernández
Best in Swimsuit	Sinaloa – Ivonne Beltran Medina
Best Hair	Colima – Jackeline Jiménez
Best Ecological Project	Veracruz – Nayeli Cabrián

== Delegates ==
The following is the list of delegates that represented the 32 States of Mexico as listed in the Miss Earth Mexico 2011 website including their height and age during the pageant:

State	Titleholder	Age	Height
Aguascalientes	Alethia Guzmán Ceja	23	1.74
Baja California	Liliana Aguilar Ramirez	18	1.70
Baja California Sur	Rocío Verdugo Castro	20	1.82
Campeche	Samantha Rosado Figueroa	18	1.71
Chiapas	Johanna Moreno de los Santos	21	1.80
Chihuahua	Ana Navar Guerra	21	1.78
Coahuila	Edni Basso Renteria	21	1.70
Colima	Jackeline Jiménez García	21	1.76
Distrito Federal	Casandra Ananké Becerra Vázquez	23	1.78
Durango	Sandra Mora Ceballos	19	1.69
Estado de México	Yadira Guadalupe Zamora Cásares	22	1.74
Guanajuato	Lourdes Aranda Cacheaux	23	1.77
Guerrero	Adriana Cuevas Gallardo	23	1.72
Hidalgo	Michelle Ramón Abarca	23	1.74
Jalisco	Verónica García Márquez	21	1.78
Michoacán	Guadalupe Hernandez Bermudez	23	1.70
Morelos	Cipactli Serrato Zapata	24	1.76
Nayarit	Ana Priscila Zárate Cortés	19	1.73
Nuevo León	Lesly García Peña	18	1.72
Oaxaca	Alejandra Sandoval Villaseñor	20	1.77
Puebla	María Nava Ramirez	18	1.77
Querétaro	Dulce Olivia Arbizu Salce	20	1.78
Quintana Roo	Ivana Saldívar Pérez	19	1.76
San Luis Potosí	Ruth Rodriguez Guerrero	18	1.76
Sinaloa	Ivonne Beltrán Medina	18	1.73
Sonora	Pamela Castro Castro	20	1.76
Tabasco	Yussihey Litzahally Vidal Celorio	18	1.71
Tamaulipas	Iriam Hernández Lopez	22	1.71
Tlaxcala	Jennifer Soto Sanchez	19	1.72
Veracruz	Nayeli Cebrian Garcia	22	1.76
Yucatán	Jessica Martinez Vadillo	22	1.74
Zacatecas	Roxana Reyes Herrera	19	1.78

== See also ==
- Miss Earth Mexico
