= Mexicana Universal Aguascalientes =

Beauty contest

- Formation: 1994 (as Nuestra Belleza Aguascalientes); 2017 (as Mexicana Universal Aguascalientes)
- Type: Beauty Pageant
- Headquarters: Aguascalientes City
- Location: Mexico
- Local Coordinator: Jacobo de Alba

Mexicana Universal Aguascalientes (until 2016 called Nuestra Belleza Aguascalientes) is a state-level contest in the state of Aguascalientes, Mexico, which selects the state representative for the national contest Mexicana Universal (formerly called Nuestra Belleza México), thus aspiring to represent the country internationally on one of the platforms offered.

The state organization has achieved the following results since 1994:

- Winner: 2 (2011, 2014)
- 1st Runner-up: 2 (1994, 2010)
- 2nd Runner-up: 2 (2013, 2025)
- 3rd Runner-up: 1 (2016)
- 4th Runner-up: 1 (2012)
- 5th Runner-up: 1 (1997)
- Top 10: 6 (1999, 2003, 2010, 2011, 2015, 2023)
- Top 15/16: 5 (1995, 2008, 2009, 2021, 2022)
- Top 20: 1 (2005)
- Unplaced: 11 (1996, 1998, 2001, 2002, 2004, 2006, 2007, 2017, 2018, 2019)
- Absences: 1 (2000)

== National Queens ==
- Karla Berumen - Mexicana Hispanoamericana 2017 (Designated)
- Wendolly Esparza - Nuestra Belleza México 2014
- Vianey Vázquez - Nuestra Belleza Internacional México 2014 (Designated)
- Karina González - Nuestra Belleza México 2011
- Gabriela Palacio - Nuestra Belleza Mundo México 2010 (Designated)
- Gabriela Palacio - Nuestra Belleza Internacional México 2010 (Designated)
- Patricia Amador - Nuestra Belleza Internacional México 1997 (Designated)

== Titleholders ==
The following are the names of the annual winners of Mexicana Universal Aguascalientes, listed in ascending order, as well as their results during the national Mexicana Universal pageant. State queens who represented the country in a current or past franchise of the national organization are also highlighted in a specific color.

Current Franchises:

- Competed at Miss Grand International.
- Competed at Miss International.
- Competed at Miss Charm.
- Competed at Reina Hispanoamericana.
- Competed at Miss Orb International.
- Competed at Nuestra Latinoamericana Universal.

Former Franchises:

- Competed at Miss Universe.
- Competed at Miss World.
- Competed at Miss Continente Americano.
- Competed at Miss Costa Maya International.
- Competed at Miss Atlántico Internacional.
- Competed at Miss Verano Viña del Mar.
- Competed at Reina Internacional del Café.
- Competed at Reina Internacional de las Flores.
- Competed at Señorita Continente Americano.
- Competed at Nuestra Belleza Internacional.

Year	Titleholder	Hometown	Placement	Special Award	Notes
2025	María Sareth Carranza Martín	Aguascalientes	2nd Runner-up	-	Competed at Mexicana Universal 2018; Mexicana Universal Aguascalientes 2017
2024	In 2024, due to changes in the dates of the national pageant, the election of the state queens was postponed for this year.				
2023	Elizabeth de Alba Ruvalcaba; Resigned from her state title due to the postponement of the national pageant.	Aguascalientes	Did not Compete	-	Top 15 at Top Model of the World 2019; Top Model of the World México 2019; Competed at Miss Mexico 2019; Top 5 at Miss Grand México 2019; Miss Aguascalientes 2018
2023	Mónica López Orozco; Replaced the 2023 state winner, she was originally the 2025 state winner, leaving the title vacant.	Aguascalientes	Top 10	-	Reina de la Uva 2023; Was born in Jalisco
2022	Nancy Deyanira Gutiérrez Aviña	Aguascalientes	Top 16	-	-
2021	Alejandra Parada López	Aguascalientes	Top 15	-	-
2020	In 2020, due to the contingency of COVID-19 there was a lag in the year of the state contest				
2019	Sandra Pamela Barrera Medel	Aguascalientes	-	-	Reina de la Feria Nacional de San Marcos 2018
2018	Martha Daniela Landín Camarillo	Aguascalientes	-	-	Competed at Miss Universe México 2024; Miss Universe Aguascalientes 2024; Competed at Miss Earth 2023; Miss Earth México 2023; Miss Earth Aguascalientes 2023; Princesa de la Feria Nacional de San Marcos 2018
2017	María Sareth Carranza Martín	Aguascalientes	-	-	2nd Runner-up at Mexicana Universal 2026; Mexicana Universal Aguascalientes 2025; Was born in Jalisco
Until 2016 the Title was Nuestra Belleza Aguascalientes
2016	Karla María López Berumen	Aguascalientes	2nd Runner-up	-	3rd Runner-up at Reina Hispanoamericana 2017; Mexicana Hispanoamericana 2017; Competed at Reina de la Feria Nacional de San Marcos 2016; Competed at Teen Universe México 2014; Teen Universe Aguascalientes 2014
2015	María Gabriela Martín del Campo Bonilla	Aguascalientes	Top 10	-	-
2014	Wendolly Esparza Delgadillo	Aguascalientes	Nuestra Belleza México	Miss Sports	Top 15 at Miss Universe 2015; Competed at Reina de la Feria Nacional de San Marcos 2014; First Mexican-American born in the USA
2013	Vianey del Rosario Vázquez Ramírez	Aguascalientes	2nd Runner-up	Steps to Fame	Reina de la Feria Nacional de San Marcos 2019; 2nd Runner-up at Miss F1 México 2015; Top 10 at Miss International 2014; Nuestra Belleza Internacional México 2014; 1st Runner-up at Nuestra Belleza Aguascalientes 2012; Was born in Jalisco
2012	Jéssica Amor Mendoza	Aguascalientes	4th Runner-up	-	Competed at Miss F1 México 2015; Reina de la Feria Nacional de San Marcos 2014
2011	Laura Karina González Muñoz	Aguascalientes	Nuestra Belleza México	Miss Talent; Steps to Fame	Top 10 at Miss Universe 2012; Reina de la Feria Nacional de San Marcos 2010
2010	Estefanía Herrera García	Aguascalientes	Top 10	-	Princesa de la Feria Nacional de San Marcos 2010; Kimberley Herrera's sister, Nuestra Belleza Aguascalientes 2008
2009	Abigail González Márquez	Aguascalientes	Top 15	-	Princesa de la Feria Nacional de San Marcos 2009
2008	Kimberley Sugey Herrera García	Aguascalientes	Top 15	-	Reina de la Feria Nacional de San Marcos 2008; Estefanía Herrera's sister, Nuestra Belleza Aguascalientes 2010
2007	Paulina Talamantes Chávez	Aguascalientes	-	-	-
2006	María Alicia Pérez Estrada	Aguascalientes	-	-	-
2005	Vanessa Castro Delgado	Aguascalientes	Top 20	-	-
2004	Yolanda Carolina Berumen Ramírez	Aguascalientes	-	-	-
2003	Liliana Leticia Bejarano González	Aguascalientes	Top 10	-	-
2002	Mariel Ramírez Pérez	Aguascalientes	-	-	Princesa de la Feria Nacional de San Marcos 2001
2001	María Isabel Gutiérrez Velasco	Calvillo	-	-	Reina de la Feria Nacional de la Guayaba 1999
2000	No candidate was sent				
1999	Ivette Jasmine Roque Ruvalcaba	Aguascalientes	Top 10	-	-
1998	Cecilia Colombe Gutiérrez Reyes	Aguascalientes	-	-	-
1997	María Patricia Amador Luján	Aguascalientes	5th Runner-up	Mary Kay Face	Competed at Nuestra Belleza Internacional 1997; Nuestra Belleza Internacional México 1997; Reina de la Feria Nacional de San Marcos 1993
1996	María del Pilar Magallanes Peréz	Aguascalientes	-	-	Princesa de la Feria Nacional de San Marcos 1996
1995	Leticía Soria Mereles	Aguascalientes	Top 16	-	-
1994	Yadhira Carrillo Villalobos	Aguascalientes	1st Runner-up	-	Reina del Carnaval de Carolina del Norte 2006

== Designated Contestants ==
Starting in 2000, states were allowed to have more than one candidate, as some states were not sending candidates for various reasons. The following contestants from Aguascalientes were invited to compete in the national pageant alongside the reigning queen, and in some cases, they achieved even better results.

Year	Titleholder	Hometown	Placement	Special Award	Notes
2011	Gabriela Elizabeth Delgado Rodríguez	Aguascalientes	Top 10	-	2nd Runner-up at Nuestra Belleza Aguascalientes 2011
2010	Gabriela Palacio Díaz de León	Aguascalientes	1st Runner-up	-	Competed at Miss World 2011; Nuestra Belleza Mundo México 2010; Competed at Miss International 2010; Nuestra Belleza Internacional México 2010; 1st Runner-up at Nuestra Belleza Aguascalientes 2010; Reina Nacional de la Feria de San Marcos 2009
2006	Ana Paulina Parga Padilla	Aguascalientes	-	-	1st Runner-up at Nuestra Belleza Aguascalientes 2009

== See also ==
- Miss Aguascalientes
