= Mariana Berumen =

Mexican beauty pageant contestant (born 1991)

Mariana Berumen Reynoso
- Born: Mariana Berumen Reynoso; October 30, 1991 (age 35); Jalostotitlán, Jalisco, Mexico
- Height: 1.78 m (5 ft 10 in)
- Beauty pageant titleholder
- Title: Nuestra Belleza Guanajuato 2011; Nuestra Belleza Mundo México 2011
- Hair color: Brown
- Eye color: Brown
- Major competitions: Nuestra Belleza Guanajuato 2011 (Winner); Nuestra Belleza Mundo México 2011 (Winner); Miss World 2012 (Top 15); Mexico's Next Top Model season 5 (1st Runner-up)

Mariana Berumen Reynoso (born October 30, 1991) is a Mexican model and beauty pageant titleholder who won the title of "Nuestra Belleza Mundo México" at the Nuestra Belleza México 2011 pageant.

Born in Jalostotitlán, Jalisco and moved to León, Guanajuato from an early age, Reynoso was chosen to represent her country in the 62nd Miss World pageant in 2012 during the 2011 edition of Nuestra Belleza México, held August 20, 2011 in Puerto Vallarta, Jalisco. The pageant was won by Aguascalientes's Karina González. Berumen was crowned Nuestra Belleza Mundo México by the outgoing titleholder Gabriela Palacio.

Awards and achievements
Preceded by (Jalisco) Cindy Gradilla	Mexico's Next Top Model; 1st Runner-up; 2014	Succeeded by ––
Preceded by (Aguascalientes) Gabriela Palacio	Nuestra Belleza Mundo México; 2011	Succeeded by (Veracruz) Marilyn Chagoya
Preceded by Helena Estefanía Baca	Nuestra Belleza Guanajuato; 2011	Succeeded by Elisa Espinoza Gómez
