= Nuestra Belleza Querétaro 2010 =

- Date: July 17, 2010
- Presenters: Alberto Romero, Alma Rosa González
- Venue: Hotel Misión Juriquilla, Querétaro, Querétaro
- Broadcaster: Televisa
- Entrants: 10
- Placements: 5
- Winner: Natasha Kaufmann (Resigned) María Perusquía (Successor)

Nuestra Belleza Querétaro 2010, was held in Hotel Misión Juriquilla, Querétaro, Querétaro on July 17, 2010. At the conclusion of the final night of competition, Natasha Kaufmann of the capital city Querétaro was crowned the winner. Kaufmann was crowned by outgoing Nuestra Belleza Querétaro titleholder, Alejandra Cabral. Ten contestants competed for the state title.

== Results ==
=== Placements ===
Final results	Contestant
Nuestra Belleza Querétaro 2010	Natasha Kaufmann (Resigned)
Suplente / 1st Runner-up	María Perusquía (Successor)
2nd Runner-up	Ana Cristina Avedillo
3rd Runner-up	Karla Piña
4th Runner-up	Carolina Palacio

== Judges ==
- Abel López - Fashion Designer
- Patricia Brogueras - Regional Coordinator of Nuestra Belleza México
- Ángeles Aguilar - Coordinator of Nuestra Belleza Oaxaca
- Carlo Antonio Rico - Producer of Nuestra Belleza México
- César Torres - Plastic Surgeon
- Miguel Sánchez - Painter

== Contestants ==
Hometown	Contestant
Querétaro	Ana Cristina Avedillo
Querétaro	Brenda Armenta
Querétaro	Carolina Palacio
Querétaro	Karla Piña
Querétaro	Laura Ruiz
Querétaro	María Guadalupe Licea
Querétaro	María Perusquía
Querétaro	Natasha Kaufmann
Querétaro	Sofía Torres

== Contestants Notes ==
- Natasha Kaufmann resigned from the state crown because she was not allowed in the Universidad Contemporánea to attend the national event, for this reason, the 1st Runner-up María Perusquía, was presented to the press in a red dress, and so was crowned Nuestra Belleza Querétaro 2010, at the hands of the two coordinators present.
