= Nuestra Belleza Tamaulipas 2010 =

Mexican beauty pageant edition

- Date: August 14, 2010
- Presenters: Oscar Schekaiban
- Venue: Teatro Amalia Caballero de Castillo Ledón, Cd. Victoria, Tamaulipas
- Broadcaster: Televisa del Golfo
- Entrants: 10
- Placements: 5
- Winner: Cecilia Ortíz (Resigned) Claudia González (Successor)

Nuestra Belleza Tamaulipas 2010, was held at the Teatro Amalia Caballero de Castillo Ledón, Cd. Victoria, Tamaulipas on August 14, 2010. At the conclusion of the final night of competition, Cecilia Ortíz of Reynosa was crowned the winner. Ortíz was crowned by outgoing Nuestra Belleza Tamaulipas titleholder, Ana Karen González. Ten contestants competed for the state title.

== Results ==
=== Placements ===
Final results	Contestant
Nuestra Belleza Tamaulipas 2010	Cecilia Ortíz (Resigned)
Suplente / 1st Runner-up	Claudia González (Successor)
Finalists	Alejandra Martínez; Brenda Uribe; Giovanna Forcade

== Background Music ==
- Aldo
- Paulina Goto

== Contestants ==
Hometown	Contestant
Cd. Victoria	Brenda Alejandra Uribe Lerma
Cd. Victoria	Claudia Elizabeth González Elizondo
Matamoros	Astrid Stefany Herrera Serna
Matamoros	Cinthia Astrid Reyes Garza
Nuevo Laredo	Alejandra Carolina Martínez Vázquez
Nuevo Laredo	Rubí Elizabeth Chávez Contreras
Reynosa	Ana Cecilia Ortiz Rodríguez
Reynosa	Giovanna Eugenia Forcade Caballero
Tampico	Ana Grecia Aguilar Hernández
Tampico	Laura Alicia Salinas Guzmán

== Contestants Notes ==
- Cecilia Ortíz was the original winner of Nuestra Belleza Tamaulipas 2010. The 1st Runner-up, Claudia González was who represented Tamaulipas in Nuestra Belleza México 2010, where she won the Academic Award and placed in the Top 15. Cecilia Ortíz quit the state crown for health reasons that prevent her from participating in national competition.
