= Mexicana Universal Coahuila =

Beauty contest

- Formation: 1994 (as Nuestra Belleza Coahuila); 2017 (as Mexicana Universal Coahuila)
- Type: Beauty pageant
- Headquarters: Saltillo
- Location: Mexico
- Local coordinator: Jesús Peña

Mexicana Universal Coahuila (until 2016 called Nuestra Belleza Coahuila) is a state-level contest in the state of Coahuila, Mexico, which selects the state representative for the national contest Mexicana Universal (formerly called Nuestra Belleza México), thus aspiring to represent the country internationally on one of the platforms offered.

The state organization has achieved the following results since 1994:

- Winner: 1 (2002)
- 1st Runner-up: 1 (2001)
- 3rd Runner-up: 1 (2004)
- Top 10/11/12: 3 (1998, 2009, 2025)
- Top 15/16: 5 (1997, 2006, 2013, 2017, 2019)
- Top 20/21: 1 (2000)
- Unplaced: 14 (1994, 1995, 1996, 1999, 2000, 2005, 2007, 2008, 2011, 2012, 2014, 2015, 2016, 2021)
- Absences: 3 (2003, 2022, 2023)

== National Queens ==
- Marisol González - Nuestra Belleza México 2002
- Greta Galindo - Reina de las Flores México 2002 (Designated)

== Titleholders ==
The following are the names of the annual winners of Mexicana Universal Coahuila, listed in ascending order, as well as their results during the national Mexicana Universal pageant. State queens who represented the country in a current or past franchise of the national organization are also highlighted in a specific color.

Current Franchises:

- Competed at Miss Grand International.
- Competed at Miss International.
- Competed at Miss Charm.
- Competed at Reina Hispanoamericana.
- Competed at Miss Orb International.
- Competed at Nuestra Latinoamericana Universal.

Former Franchises:

- Competed at Miss Universe.
- Competed at Miss World.
- Competed at Miss Continente Americano.
- Competed at Miss Costa Maya International.
- Competed at Miss Atlántico Internacional.
- Competed at Miss Verano Viña del Mar.
- Competed at Reina Internacional del Café.
- Competed at Reina Internacional de las Flores.
- Competed at Señorita Continente Americano.
- Competed at Nuestra Belleza Internacional.

Year	Titleholder	Hometown	Placement	Special Award	Notes
2026	Daniela Guardiola Martínez	Saltillo	TBD		2nd Runner-up at Teen Universe México 2022; Teen Universe Coahuila RM 2021
2025	Andrea Treviño de León	Piedras Negras	Top 12	-	1st Runner-up at Miss Coahuila 2023; Competed in Miss Beauty México 2021; Miss Beauty Coahuila 2021
2024	In 2024, due to changes in the dates of the national pageant, the election of the state queens was postponed for one year.				
2023	Fernanda González; Withdrew from the national competition due to the postponement of the national pageant.	Saltillo	Did not Compete		Top Model Saltillo 2022
2022	Ytana Marina Torres Fernández	Cuatro Ciénegas	-	-	-
2021	Frida Elizabeth Reynoso Rivas	Piedras Negras	-	-	Top Model of the World México 2026; Top 12 at Miss México Cosmo 2025; Top 11 at Miss México 2025; Miss Coahuila 2025; 2nd Runner-up at Miss Grand México 2023; Miss Grand Coahuila 2023; Competed at Embajadora México 2021; Embajadora Coahuila 2021; 1st Runner-up at Mexicana Universal Coahuila 2017
2020	In 2020, due to the contingency of COVID-19 there was a lag in the year of the state contest				
2019	Ana Lucila Linaje Esquivel	Monclova	Top 15	-	Competed at Nuestra Belleza México 2016; Nuestra Belleza Coahuila 2015; Competed at Teen Universe México 2014; Teen Universe Coahuila 2014
2018	No candidate was sent				
2017	María Priscila Leal de Hoyos	Frontera	Top 16	-	-
Until 2016 the Title was Nuestra Belleza Coahuila
2016	Edna Kikey Sato de la Cruz	Piedras Negras	-	-	Competed at Miss F1 México 2015; Competed at Nuestra Belleza Coahuila 2015
2015	Ana Lucila Linaje Esquivel	Monclova	-	-	Top 15 at Mexicana Universal 2020; Mexicana Universal Coahuila 2019; Competed at Miss Teen Universe México 2014; Teen Universe Coahuila 2014
2014	Ángela del Carmen del Río Moncayo	Torreón	-	-	Competed at Miss F1 México 2015; 2nd Runner-up at Nuestra Belleza Coahuila 2012
2013	Elisa María Villarreal Hernández	Castaños	Top 15	-	1st Runner-up at Nuestra Belleza Coahuila 2010
2012	Cecilia Nallely Vázquez Aguirre	Saltillo	-	-	-
2011	Diana Eloísa Ávila Ibarra	Torreón	-	-	Competed at Miss F1 México 2015; 2nd Runner-up at Nuestra Belleza Coahuila 2010
2010	Cecilia Flores Nogueira	Torreón	3rd Runner-up	-	-
2009	Abril Alejandra Rodríguez Fernández	Saltillo	Top 10	Personality Fraiche	-
2008	Amanda Terry Mondragón	Piedras Negras	-	-	-
2007	Alejandra Martínez Zepeda	Torreón	-	-	-
2006	Luz Areli Astorga Gurza	Torreón	Top 15	-	-
2005	Bessie Batarse Moore	Torreón	-	-	-
2004	Melissa Cantú Rosales	Torreón	3rd Runner-up	-	-
2003	No candidate was sent				
2002	Marisol González Casas	Torreón	Nuestra Belleza México	Best Figure	Competed at Miss Universe 2003
2001	Greta Galindo de la Peña	Torreón	1st Runner-up	Best Figure	Competed at Reinado Internacional de las Flores 2002; Reina de las Flores México 2002; Top 20 at Nuestra Belleza Mundo México 2001
2000	Alma Mireya Cantú García	Torreón	Top 20	-	Top 20 at Nuestra Belleza Mundo México 2000
1999	Helga Fernández Ramos	Torreón	-	-	-
1998	Teresa Roldán Rodríguez	Monclova	Top 10	-	-
1997	Alejandra Mena Ramírez	Torreón	Top 16	-	1st Runner-up at Belleza Mundial 1998; Belleza Mundial México 1998
1996	Martha Elena Padilla Galarza	Torreón	-	-	-
1995	Irma Vanessa Guerrero Martínez	Piedras Negras	-	-	-
1994	Gabriela Pacheco Pascual	Torreón	-	-	-

== Designated Contestants ==
Starting in 2000, states were allowed to have more than one candidate, as some states were not sending candidates for various reasons. The following contestants from Coahuila were invited to compete in the national pageant alongside the reigning queen, and in some cases, they achieved even better results.

Year	Titleholder	Hometown	Placement	Special Award	Notes
2005	Ana Isabel Muñoz Ortiz	Torreón	-	-	1st Runner-up at Nuestra Belleza Coahuila 2005
2000	Dulce René Ríos Torres	Torreón	-	-	Runner-up at Nuestra Belleza Coahuila 2000
2000	María Elena Villalobos Sosa	Torreón	-	-	Runner-up at Nuestra Belleza Coahuila 2000

== See also ==
- Miss Coahuila
