= Karin Ontiveros =

Mexican beauty pageant contestant (born 1988)

Karín Ontiveros
- Born: Karin Cecilia Ontiveros Meza; February 5, 1988 (age 38); Amatitán, Jalisco, Mexico
- Height: 1.76 m (5 ft 9 1/2 in)
- Spouse: Alvaro Aguilar (m. 2015)
- Beauty pageant titleholder
- Title: Nuestra Belleza Jalisco 2010; Nuestra Belleza México 2010
- Hair color: Brown
- Eye color: Green

Karin Cecilia Ontiveros Meza (born February 5, 1988) is a Mexican TV host, model, sportscaster and beauty pageant titleholder who was crowned Nuestra Belleza México 2010 and represented Mexico at Miss Universe 2011.

== Pageantry ==
Ontiveros was crowned Nuestra Belleza Jalisco the night of July 22, 2010, and subsequently represented her state in the national competition, held in Saltillo, Coahuila, where she competed against thirty young women from all over the country. Ontiveros became the third consecutive Nuestra Belleza México winner from Jalisco on September 25, 2010, and the fourth in the pageant's history. She was crowned by the outgoing national titleholder, and reigning Miss Universe 2010 Ximena Navarrete. Ontiveros participated in Miss Universe 2011 pageant, but she was unplaced. After arriving in her home country of Mexico, she announced that she would be representing her national soccer team during the 2011 Pan American Games inauguration. Two months after competing in the Miss Universe 2011 pageant, Ontiveros is now pursuing a modeling career with Hollywood Model Management in Los Angeles, California

== ESPN ==
In 2013, Ontiveros began appearing on ESPN Deportes and ESPN Latin America on various programs and segments. Ontiveros appeared along Juan Pablo Fernández in the morning show named Toque Inicial which airs weekday mornings on ESPN Latin America. Ontiveros hosted the afternoon edition of ESPN's popular show Fútbol Picante which airs on both ESPN Deportes and ESPN Latin America weekday afternoons. Ontiveros did a sports news brief called SportCenter Ahora multiple times a day, the segments air between shows and during shows like Raza Deportiva and Jorge Ramos y su Banda. Ontiveros occasionally filled in for Kary Correa as host on the show Los Capitanes which is also hosted by José Ramón Fernández. Ontiveros covered events such as the Summer X Games, the 2013 Abierto Mexicano, Super Bowl XLVIII, the 2014 UEFA Champions League Final and Mexico national football team matches. She quietly left the station in the Spring of 2015.

== Personal life ==
The daughter of Raúl Ontiveros and Paula Meza, Karin Ontiveros was born in Amatitán, Jalisco. She is an industrial design student at the CUAAD, University of Guadalajara, and has two brothers. In 2015, Ontiveros married a man named Alvaro Aguilar.

Awards and achievements
Preceded by (Jalisco) Ximena Navarrete	Nuestra Belleza México; 2010	Succeeded by (Aguascalientes) Karina González
Preceded by Janeth Pérez	Nuestra Belleza Jalisco; 2010	Succeeded by Maria Padilla (Successor)
