= Mexicana Universal Guanajuato =

- Formation: 1994 (as Nuestra Belleza Guanajuato); 2017 (as Mexicana Universal Guanajuato)
- Type: Beauty Pageant
- Headquarters: León
- Location: Mexico
- Local Coordinator: Erika Gómez

Mexicana Universal Guanajuato (until 2016 called Nuestra Belleza Guanajuato) is a state-level contest in the state of Guanajuato, Mexico, which selects the state representative for the national contest Mexicana Universal (formerly called Nuestra Belleza México), thus aspiring to represent the country internationally on one of the platforms offered.

The state organization has achieved the following results since 1994:

- Winner: 4 (1998, 2007, 2011, 2021)
- Top 10/11/12: 6 (1999, 2002, 2003, 2005, 2008, 2023)
- Top 15/16: 2 (1997, 2012)
- Top 20/21: 3 (2001, 2004, 2018)
- Unplaced: 18 (1994, 1995, 1996, 2000, 2001, 2003, 2005, 2006, 2009, 2010, 2013, 2014, 2015, 2016, 2017, 2019, 2022, 2023)

== National Queens ==
- Grecia Rincón - Mexicana Orb 2026 (Designated)
- Diana Robles - Mexicana Hispanoamericana 2022
- Mariana Berumen - Nuestra Belleza Mundo México 2011
- Andrea Martínez de Velasco - Reina Hispanoamericana México 2009 (Designated)
- Elisa Nájera - Nuestra Belleza México 2007
- Vilma Zamora - Nuestra Belleza Mundo México 1998

== Titleholders ==
The following are the names of the annual winners of Mexicana Universal Colima, listed in ascending order, as well as their results during the national Mexicana Universal pageant. State queens who represented the country in a current or past franchise of the national organization are also highlighted in a specific color.

Current Franchises:

- Competed at Miss Grand International.
- Competed at Miss International.
- Competed at Miss Charm.
- Competed at Reina Hispanoamericana.
- Competed at Miss Orb International.
- Competed at Nuestra Latinoamericana Universal.

Former Franchises:

- Competed at Miss Universe.
- Competed at Miss World.
- Competed at Miss Continente Americano.
- Competed at Miss Costa Maya International.
- Competed at Miss Atlántico Internacional.
- Competed at Miss Verano Viña del Mar.
- Competed at Reina Internacional del Café.
- Competed at Reina Internacional de las Flores.
- Competed at Señorita Continente Americano.
- Competed at Nuestra Belleza Internacional.

Year	Titleholder	Hometown	Placement	Special Award	Notes
2025	Frida Alissa Rincón Vaca	Irapuato	-	-	1st Runner-up at Miss Intercontinental México 2024; Miss Intercontinental San Luis Potosí 2024
2024	In 2024, due to changes in the dates of the national pageant, the election of the state queens was postponed for one year.				
2023	Grecia García Rincón	León	Top 10	Best in Evening Gown	Will compete at Miss Orb International 2027; Mexicana Orb 2026
2022	María Alexia Cruz Parada	León	-	-	-
2021	Diana Laura Abigail Robles Rivera	León	Mexicana Hispanoamericana	-	3rd Runner-up at Reina Hispanoamericana 2022
2020	In 2020, due to the contingency of COVID-19 there was a lag in the year of the state contest				
2019	Luz María Guillén Jiménez	León	-	-	-
2018	Ana Carolina Gaona Camarena	Irapuato	Top 20	-	-
2017	Karla Marcela Marcocchio Hernández	Irapuato	-	-	-
Until 2016 the Title was Nuestra Belleza Guanajuato
2016	Valentina Krauss Moreno	Guanajuato	-	-	-
2015	Samantha del Rosario Peña Navarro (Resigned)	León	Did not Compete	-	Competed at Nuestra Belleza Guanajuato 2014
2015	Daniela Arellano Gómez (Assumed)	León	-	-	2nd Runner-up at Nuestra Belleza Guanajuato 2015
2014	Hilda Margarita Jiménez Aguirre	León	-	-	9th Runner-up at Mexico's Next Top Model 2013
2013	Giovana Vázquez Fuentes	Moroleón	-	-	-
2012	Elisa Espinoza Gómez	Celaya	Top 15	-	Competed at Miss F1 México 2015; Miss Costa Maya International 2014; Miss Costa Maya México 2014; Señorita Universidad de Guanajuato 2011
2011	Mariana Berumen Reynoso	León	Nuestra Belleza Mundo México		Competed at Miss Model of the World 2018; Miss Model of the World México 2018; 1st Runner-up at Mexico's Next Top Model 2014; Top 15 at Miss World 2012; Was born in Jalisco
2011	Carolina Miranda Olvera	Irapuato	Assumed the state title when Mariana Berumen won Nuestra Belleza Mundo México 2011; 1st Runner-up at Nuestra Belleza Guanajuato 2011		
2010	Helena Estefanía Baca Anaya	León	-	-	-
2009	Clementina Velásquez Mojica	León	-	-	-
2008	Andrea Martínez de Velasco Martínez	Celaya	Top 10	-	Competed at Reina Hispanoamericana 2009; Reina Hispanoamericana México 2009
2007	Elisa Nájera Gualito	Celaya	Nuestra Belleza México	Fuller Beauty Queen	4th Runner-up at Miss Universe 2008
2006	Pilar Pérez Reyes	León	-	-	Was born in Sinaloa
2005	Fernanda Verdín Martínez	León	-	-	-
2004	Ana Paulina Hurtado Castro	León	Top 20	-	-
2003	Rubí Valdés Silva	León	Top 10	-	-
2002	María Vanessa Cisneros Lozano	León	Top 10	-	-
2001	Anabel Mendoza Muñoz	León	Top 20	-	Top 21 at Nuestra Belleza Mundo México 2001
2000	Esmeralda Marún Rodríguez	Guanajuato	-	-	-
1999	María Esther Espinosa Martínez	Celaya	Top 10	-	-
1998	Vilma Verónica Zamora Suñol	Guanajuato	Nuestra Belleza Mundo México	-	Competed at Reinado Internacional de las Flores 2000; Reina de las Flores México 2000; Competed at Miss World 1998; 2nd Runner-up at Señorita Continente Americano 1998; Señorita Continente Americano México 1998
1997	Mónica Macías Chávez	Celaya	Top 16	-	-
1996	Lilian de Anda Gómez	Celaya	-	-	-
1995	María Eva Curiel Padilla	León	-	-	Was born in the Mexico City
1994	Blanca Estela Padilla López	Guanajuato	-	-	-

== Designated Contestants ==
Starting in 2000, states were allowed to have more than one candidate, as some states were not sending candidates for various reasons. The following contestants from Guanajuato were invited to compete in the national pageant alongside the reigning queen, and in some cases, they achieved even better results.

Year	Titleholder	Hometown	Placement	Special Award	Notes
2005	Angela Sandoval	Celaya	Top 10	Best Hair	1st Runner-up at Nuestra Belleza Guanajuato 2005
2003	Esther Alejandra Córdoba Toscano	León	-	-	Competed at Miss Teen Mayan World 2003; Miss Teen Mayan World México 2003; Runner-up at Nuestra Belleza Guanajuato 2003
2003	Norma Elena González Barrón	León	-	-	Miss Pacific of the World 2007; Miss Pacific of the World México 2007; Competed at Miss Expo World 2003; Miss Expo World México 2003; Runner-up at Nuestra Belleza Guanajuato 2003
2001	Claudia Albo López	Irapuato	-	-	Runner-up at Nuestra Belleza Guanajuato 2001
2001	Karín Elizabeth Huerta Arredondo	Irapuato	Top 20	-	Top 21 at Nuestra Belleza Mundo México 2001; Runner-up at Nuestra Belleza Guanajuato 2001
2001	Leticia Vanessa Jiménez	Guanajuato	-	-	Runner-up at Nuestra Belleza Guanajuato 2001

== See also ==
- Miss Guanajuato
