= Ximena Navarrete =

Mexican model (born 1988)

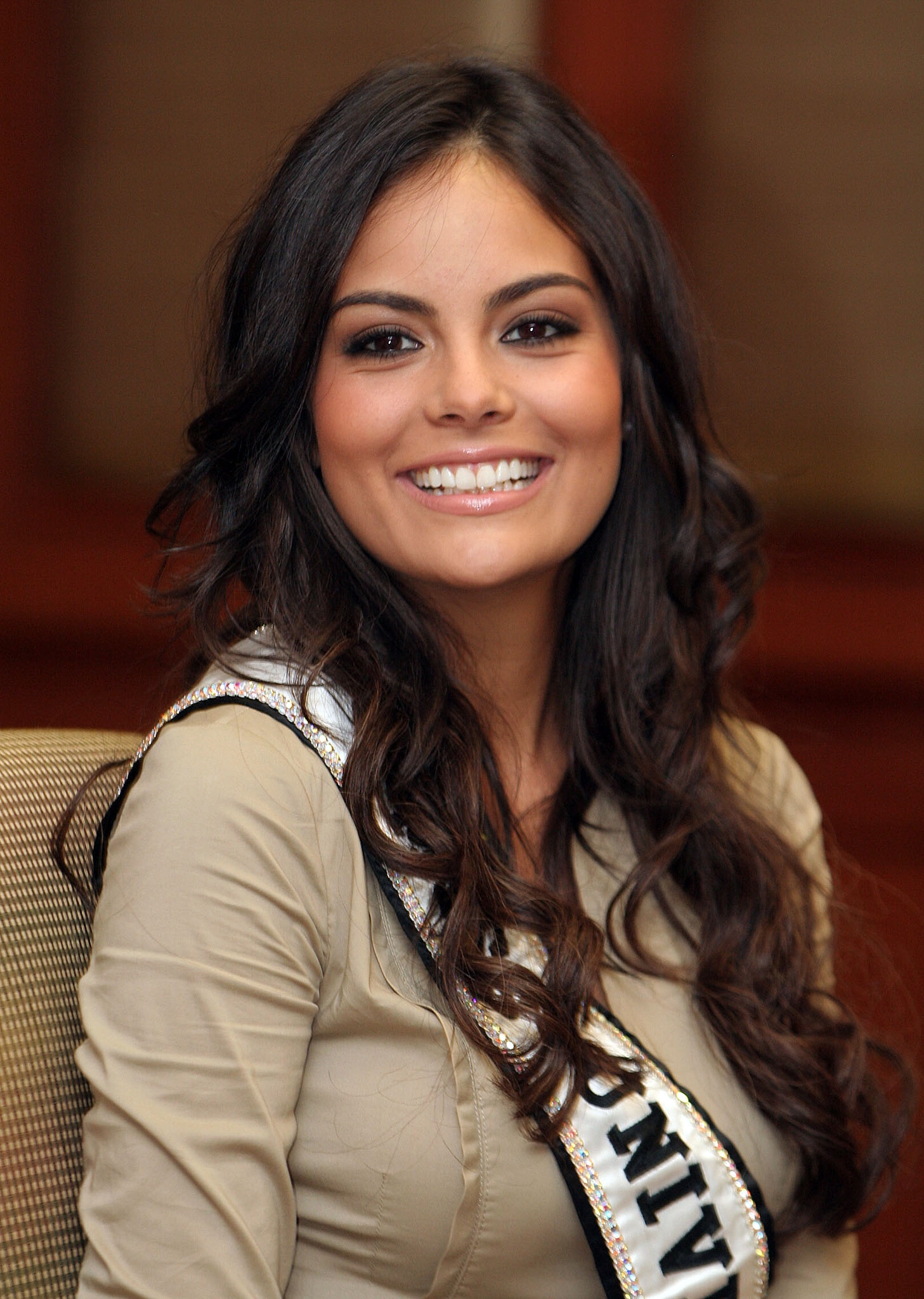
- Ximena Navarrete in 2011
- Born: Jimena Navarrete Rosete (Note: Officially her name is spelled Jimena, though she prefers writing it as Ximena.); February 22, 1988 (age 38); Guadalajara, Jalisco, Mexico
- Occupations: Model, actress
- Height: 1.75 m (5 ft 9 in)
- Spouse: Juan Valladares (m. 2017)
- Children: 3
- Beauty pageant titleholder
- Title: Nuestra Belleza Jalisco 2009; Nuestra Belleza México 2009; Miss Universe 2010
- Years active: 2010–present
- Hair color: Brown
- Eye color: Brown
- Major competitions: Nuestra Belleza Jalisco 2009 (Winner); Nuestra Belleza México 2009 (Winner); Miss Universe 2010 (Winner)

Jimena "Ximena" Navarrete Rosete (Spanish pronunciation: [xiˈmena naβaˈrete]; born February 22, 1988) is a Mexican actress, TV host, model and beauty queen who was crowned Miss Universe 2010. She was previously named as Nuestra Belleza México 2009. She became the second Miss Universe from Mexico.

== Early life ==
Navarrete was born and raised in Guadalajara, the capital city of Jalisco, Mexico to a middle-class family. She is one of two children, born to Carlos Navarrete, a dentist, and Gabriela Rosette, a housewife. She has one younger sister. She began modeling locally at the age of sixteen, and studied nutrition at the Valle de Atemajac University, prior to taking part in the world pageant. In 2012, Ximena accepted to be part of a genetic study, her maternal lineage is haplogroup J.

== Pageantry ==
=== Nuestra Belleza México 2009 ===
Navarrete was crowned Nuestra Belleza Jalisco on July 16, 2009, in her hometown, and subsequently won the national title of Nuestra Belleza México as well, besting thirty-three other contestants during the 16th edition of that event, held September 20, 2009 in Mérida, Yucatán. That night, Navarrete became the second consecutive winner from Jalisco, following Karla Carrillo, the outgoing titleholder and a close friend who encouraged her to participate in the pageant.

=== Miss Universe 2010 ===
On August 23, 2010, Navarrete (then known as "Jimena") was named Miss Universe.

In October 2010, Navarrete traveled to Shanghai, China for the 2010 World Expo and Shanghai Fashion Week. On February 10, 2011, Navarrete became spokesperson of L'Oreal Paris and Old Navy. She had her first official photo shoot in Mexico. In March 2011, Navarrete traveled to Moscow, Russia and Santo Domingo, Dominican Republic to attend the national finals respectively. She then traveled to Puerto Rico for the Puerto Rico Golf Open. She also traveled to Panama to work with Aid for AIDS and attended the Thai national final at Bangkok, Thailand on March 26, 2011.

In May 2011, Navarrete traveled to Guadalajara, Mexico, her hometown, to raise awareness for Children International, a U.S.-based humanitarian organization helping over 12,000 poor children there. In July 2011, Navarrete attended the Chilean national final at Santiago, Chile. She also traveled to the Atlantis Paradise Island, The Bahamas to help crown Miss Teen USA on July 16, 2011. During her reign, Navarrete traveled to Spain, multiple trips in Mexico, Indonesia, China, France, India, Russia, Dominican Republic, Puerto Rico, Panama, Thailand, Brazil, Guatemala, Chile and Bahamas in addition to numerous trips around the United States.

== Modeling and acting ==
On February 10, 2011, Navarrete became spokesperson of L'Oreal Paris and Old Navy. In 2013, Navarrete announced she would debut her acting career in the soap opera La tempestad. On February 15, 2013, Salvador Mejía confirmed that Navarrete and William Levy would portray the protagonists of the telenovela. She played a twin role, as Marina Reverte and Magdalena Artigas.

== Personal life ==
In 2017, Navarrete married Juan Carlos Valladares in a Catholic ceremony. After experiencing a miscarriage, the couple welcomed a daughter in late 2021 via the use of assisted reproductive technology. In October 2022, it was revealed that the couple were expecting their second child.

== Filmography ==
Television
| Year | Title | Role | Notes |
|---|---|---|---|
| 2010 | Late Show with David Letterman | Herself | Top Ten List Presenter |
| 2010 | Décadas | Herself | Special Appearance |
| 2010 | Latin Grammy Awards of 2010 | Herself | Presenter |
| 2012 | América celebra a Chespirito | Herself | Presenter |
| 2012 | Nuestra Belleza México 2012 | Herself | Presenter |
| 2012 | Miss Universe 2012 | Herself | Judge |
| 2012 | Premios TVyNovelas | Herself | Presenter |
| 2013 | Latin Grammy Awards of 2013 | Herself | Presenter |
| 2014 | Nuestra Belleza México 2014 | Herself | Presenter |
| 2015 | Jalisco... Algo contigo | Herself | Special Appearance |
| 2023 | Miss Universe 2022 | Herself | Selection Committee |

Telenovelas
| Year | Title | Role | Notes |
|---|---|---|---|
| 2013 | La tempestad | Marina Reverte Artigas/Magdalena Reverte Artigas | Telenovelas Debut; Protagonist |
| 2015 | 108 Costuras | Gaby | Lead role |

== Notes ==
Awards and achievements
| Preceded by (Venezuela) Stefanía Fernández | Miss Universe; 2010 | Succeeded by (Angola) Leila Lopes |
| Preceded by (Jalisco) Karla Carrillo | Nuestra Belleza México; 2009 | Succeeded by (Jalisco) Karin Ontiveros |
| Preceded by Mayra Gonzalez | Nuestra Belleza Jalisco; 2009 | Succeeded by Janeth Pérez (Successor) |
