= Feria Nacional de San Marcos =

National fair held in the Mexican state of Aguascalientes

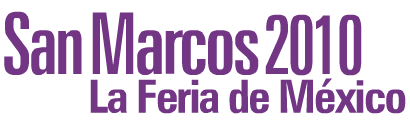

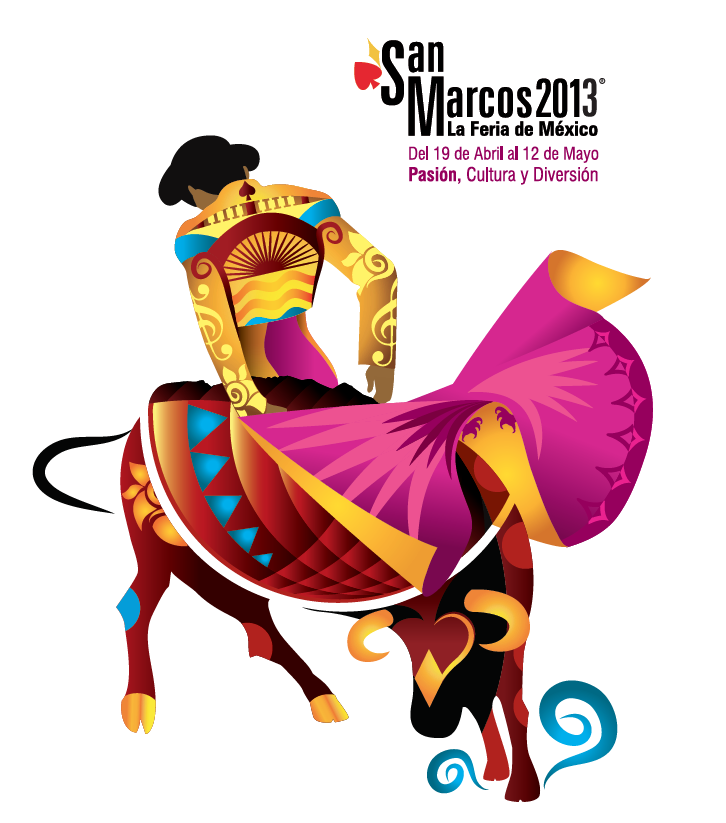

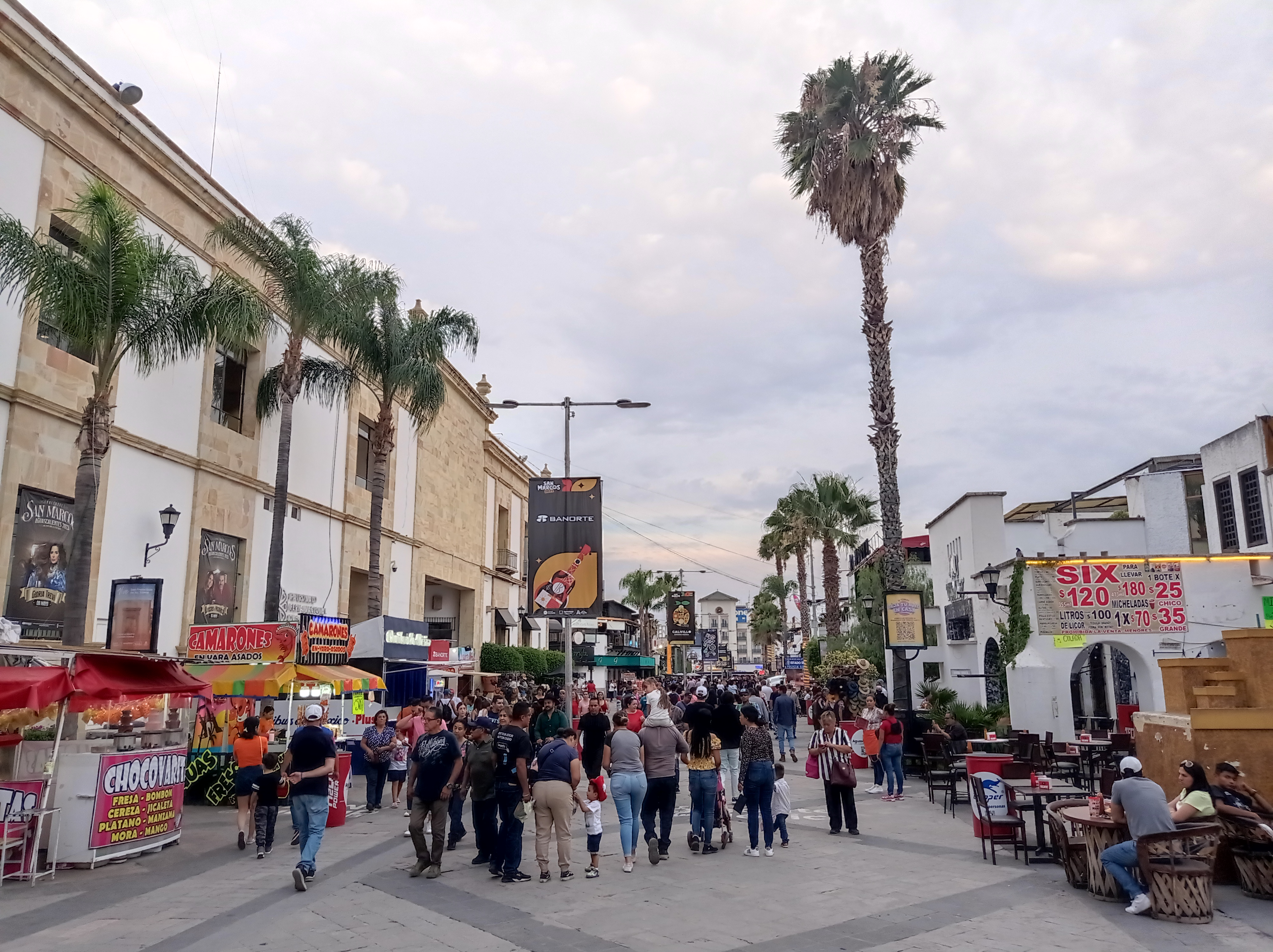
Feria Nacional de San Marcos 2023 in Aguascalientes, Mexico.

The Feria Nacional de San Marcos (National Fair of Saint Mark) is a national fair held in the Mexican state of Aguascalientes every year for three (or sometimes four) weeks. Most of the events occur in the city of Aguascalientes, the state capital. The exact date of the fair varies every year, but is set around April 25, the Feast Day of St. Mark.

Initially the fair was tied to the vendimia (harvesting of grapes) since wine production used to be an important activity in Aguascalientes. Nowadays, it is an important tourist attraction that is heavily associated with bullfighting and cockfighting. It is estimated that seven million people visit the fair every year and as a consequence hotels are usually filled to capacity. Some locals rent out their houses to visitors and go on vacation during this time.

== Activities ==
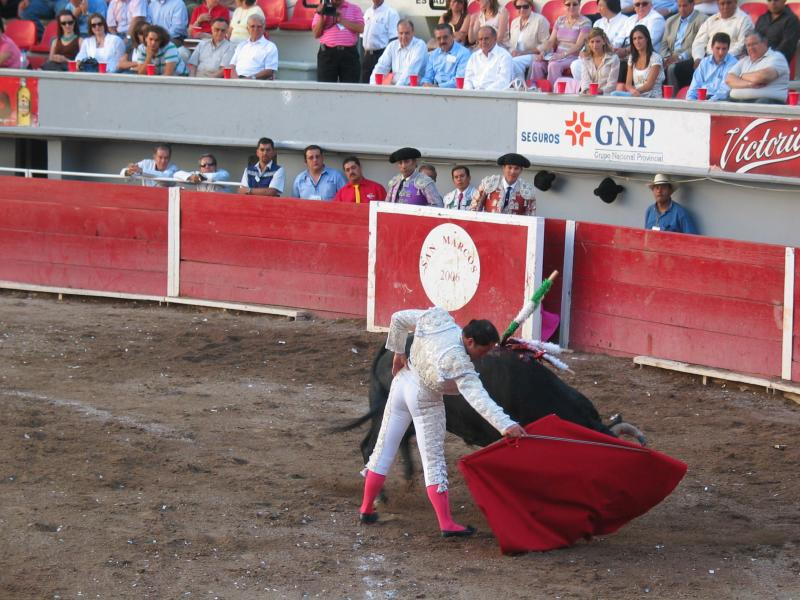
Bullfight at the Plaza de Toros Monumental de Aguascalientes.

The San Marcos National Fair is organized by an independent foundation that oversees the governance of what happens at the fair, but is supported by the state and city governments of Aguascalientes.

The fair is host to a large range of activities, of which bullfighting and cockfighting are the most popular. Usually a concert is given by a prominent Mexican singer after a series of cockfights; this event tends to draw more attention than the fights themselves.

Located in the main fair venue are an assortment of sponsored stands and mechanical games, as well as stages where various concerts and theater plays are performed. The livestock fair and the charreadas still remain an important part of the celebration. Parties where traditional Mexican music is played (tamboras) are also celebrated on the streets of Aguascalientes. Finally, a casino is licensed in downtown Aguascalientes just for the occasion.

Concerts, art exhibits and other cultural events complement the fair in many locations around the state. The award ceremony of the National Award for Youth Art occurs in Aguascalientes during this time as well.

== History ==
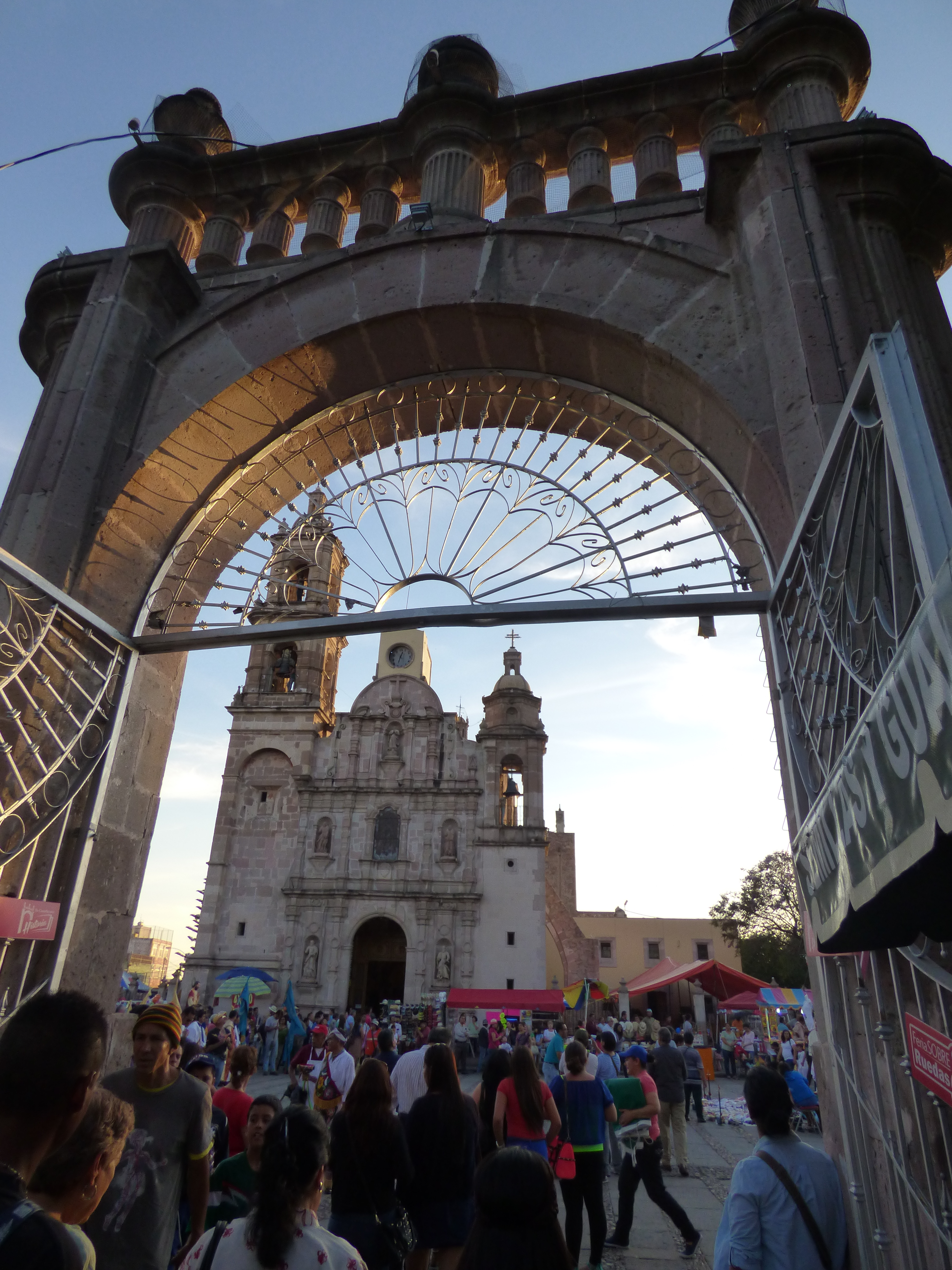
Old barrio (neighborhood) of San Marcos.

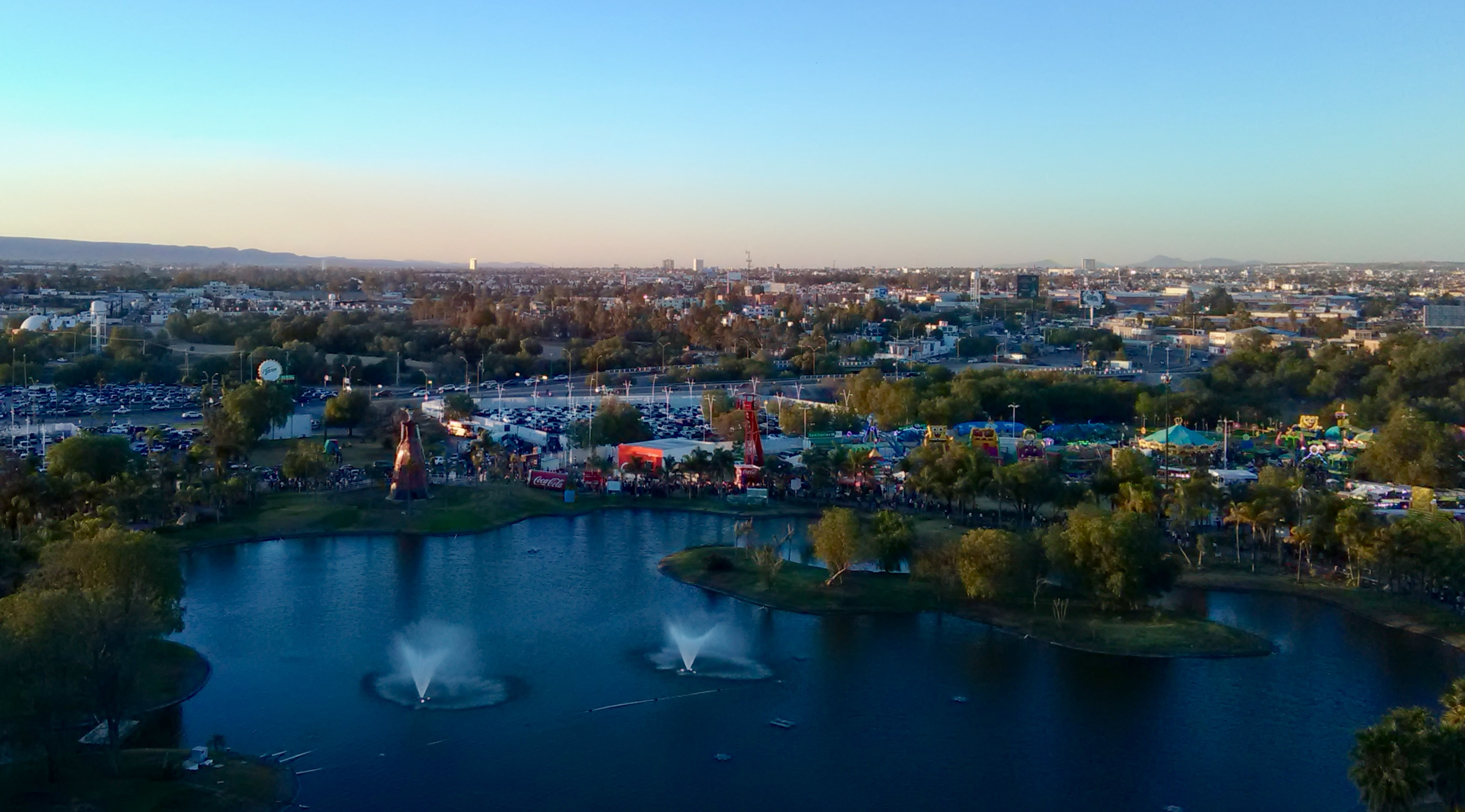
Isla San Marcos (San Marcos island theme park).

The fair was celebrated for the first time around harvest time from November 5 to November 20, 1828, as a showcase of the state's produce and livestock. During that time it was in direct competition with the fairs of Acapulco, Jalapa and San Juan de los Lagos.

The celebrations centered in the Parián, a market in the city of Aguascalientes, until 1848. In 1842 the outside balustrade of San Marcos Park was built in a plot of land donated by the Catholic Church. The balustrade is of Neoclassical style and is still preserved to this day. Once San Marcos Park was completed the date of celebration was changed to April to coincide with the festivities in honor the patron saint San Marcos (Saint Mark).

Construction of the San Marcos Plaza bullring started in 1896 and was completed in only 48 days. From that date bullfighting was included in the festivities. It was not until 1992 that the much larger Monumental Plaza de San Marcos was built, with a seating capacity of fifteen thousand people.

Since 1924 the winner of the beauty pageant has been crowned "Queen of the Fair". In 2006, after some electoral controversy, three queens were appointed.

In 1958 the fair was elevated to the rank of "National" by President Adolfo López Mateos.

On April 26, 2009, the fair was canceled due to the pandemic flu (H1N1/swine flu/ influenza virus)virus that was affecting certain areas of Mexico. This was the first time in 181 fairs that the festivities had been canceled. On July 2, 2020, due to the COVID-19 pandemic, it was cancelled for the second time in its history, and five months later, on January 21, 2021, it was announced that the fair would be canceled for the second year in a row.
