= Nuestra Belleza México 2009 =

16th edition of Nuestra Belleza México beauty pageant

- Date: September 20, 2009
- Presenters: Marisol González, Alma Saint Martín, Ernesto Laguardia, Sebastian Rulli
- Entertainment: Ana Bárbara, Alexander Acha, Telefunka
- Venue: Centro de Convenciones Yucatán Siglo XXI, Mérida, Yucatán, Mexico
- Broadcaster: Televisa
- Entrants: 34
- Placements: 15
- Withdrawals: Hidalgo, Tabasco
- Returns: Estado de México, Quintana Roo, Tlaxcala
- Winner: Ximena Navarrete; Jalisco

Nuestra Belleza México 2009, the 16th annual Nuestra Belleza México beauty pageant, was held at the Centro de Convenciones Yucatán Siglo XXI of Mérida, Yucatán, Mexico on September 20, 2009. It was the second time there were back-to-back victories for a state in Nuestra Belleza México history: Ximena Navarrete from Jalisco was crowned by outgoing Nuestra Belleza México titleholder Karla Carrillo also from Jalisco. She was the third Jalisciense to win this title. Thirty-four contestants of the Mexican Republic competed for the national title. Navarrete competed in Miss Universe 2010 in the US and won the Universal Title.

The Nuestra Belleza Mundo México title was won by Anabel Solís from Yucatán, who competed in Miss World 2010 in China. Solís was crowned by outgoing Nuestra Belleza Mundo México titleholder Perla Beltrán. She is the first and only Yucateca and second with red hair to win this Title.

The recognition "Corona al Mérito 2009" was for Lilián Villanueva, Nuestra Belleza Internacional México 2000 and Reina Internacional de las Flores 2001.

== Results ==
=== Placements ===
Placement	Contestant
Nuestra Belleza México 2009	Jalisco – Ximena Navarrete
Nuestra Belleza Mundo México 2009	Yucatán – Anabel Solís
1st Runner-Up	Zacatecas – Verónica Llamas (Dethroned)
2nd Runner-Up	Sinaloa – Gabriela Quintero
3rd Runner-Up	Jalisco – Sandra Luz Vargas
Top 10	Chiapas – Claudia Espinoza; Chihuahua – Daniela Muñoz; Coahuila – Abril Rodríguez; Distrito Federal – Jacqueline Tostado; Sonora – Lorena Camargo
Top 15	Aguascalientes – Abigaíl González; Baja California – Ana Sofía García; Estado de México – Mercedes Gutiérrez; Nuevo León – Adriana Treviño; Querétaro – Paulina Cabrera

=== Order of Announcements ===
==== Top 15 ====
1. Querétaro
2. Chihuahua
3. Jalisco
4. Zacatecas
5. Sinaloa
6. Aguascalientes
7. Estado de México
8. Jalisco
9. Coahuila
10. Sonora
11. Nuevo León
12. Chiapas
13. Baja California
14. Yucatán
15. Distrito Federal

==== Top 10 ====
1. Zacatecas
2. Chihuahua
3. Coahuila
4. Sonora
5. Distrito Federal
6. Yucatán
7. Jalisco
8. Sinaloa
9. Jalisco
10. Chiapas

==== Top 5 ====
1. Jalisco
2. Jalisco
3. Sinaloa
4. Zacatecas
5. Yucatán

=== Special awards ===
Award	Contestant
Miss Top Model	Sinaloa - Gabriela Quintero
Contestants' Choice	Zacatecas - Verónica Llamas
Miss Talent	Chihuahua - Daniela Muñoz
Miss Sports	Querétaro - Paulina Cabrera
Academic Award	Jalisco - Ximena Navarrete
Fuller Beauty Queen	Jalisco - Ximena Navarrete
Steps to Fame	Nuevo León - Adriana Treviño
Personality Fraiche	Coahuila - Abril Rodríguez
Miss Sensodyne Whitening	Yucatán - Anabel Solís
Best National Costume	Yucatán - "Yum Kax, Diosa de la Gran Madre Tierra"

== Judges ==
They were the same judges at the Preliminary and Final Competition.

- Carla Estrada - Television Producer
- David Salomon - Fashion Designer
- Elisa Nájera - Nuestra Belleza México 2007
- Francisco Contreras - Fashion Producer
- Laura de la Torre - Vice-President of Fuller Cosmetics
- Luis Moya - Cosemtic Dermatologist
- Maru Ruiz - Magazine Editor
- René Strickler - Actor
- Sergio Mayer - Actor
- Valentino Lanús - Actor

== Background music ==
- Opening Number: "Medley of the host State" by Contestants
- Swimsuit Competition: "Desechable" by Telefunka
- Intermediate: "Rompiendo Cadenas" by Ana Bárbara
- Intermediate: "Mujeres" by Alexander Acha
- Evening Gown Competition: Telefunka
- Crowning Moment: "Nuestra Belleza México" (Official Theme)

== Contestants ==
State	Contestant	Age	Height	Hometown
Aguascalientes	Abigail González Márquez	23	1.74	Aguascalientes
Baja California	Ana Sofía García Gallegos	21	1.78	Mexicali
Baja California Sur	Giovanna Martínez Uriarte	22	1.72	La Paz
Campeche	Laura Rodríguez Toraya	19	1.78	Escárcega
Chiapas	Claudia Espinosa Gómez	23	1.73	Catazajá
Chiapas	Mildreth Jiménez León	20	1.71	Cintalapa
(Chihuahua (state)) Chihuahua	Daniela Muñoz Grijalva	23	1.72	Chihuahua
Coahuila	Abril Alejandra Rodríguez Fernández	22	1.75	Saltillo
Colima	Giannina Giselle Huerta Dueñas	23	1.75	Colima
(Mexico City) Distrito Federal	Jacqueline Tostado Madrid	22	1.72	Mexico City
Durango	Marcela Maynez Núñez	19	1.70	Gómez Palacio
(State of Mexico) Estado de México	Mercedes Gutiérrez Mares	23	1.75	Toluca
Guanajuato	Clementina Velázquez Mojica	19	1.78	León
Guerrero	Ana Rosa Manrique Aguirre	21	1.77	Tlapehuala
Jalisco	Sandra Luz Vargas Plazola	22	1.77	Puerto Vallarta
Jalisco	Jimena "Ximena" Navarrete Rosete	21	1.74	Guadalajara
Michoacán	Itzel García Rojas	22	1.69	Apatzingán
Morelos	Anaiza Aguilar Macedo	21	1.70	Cuernavaca
Nayarit	Viridiana Torrijos Valencia	18	1.75	Tepic
Nuevo León	Adriana Graciela Treviño Peralta	23	1.74	Monterrey
Oaxaca	Denise Mendiola Chávez	19	1.74	Oaxaca
Puebla	Andrea Castro Téllez	20	1.72	Puebla
Querétaro	Alejandra Cabral Cabrera	21	1.72	Querétaro
Querétaro	Paulina Cabrera Balderas	23	1.75	Querétaro
Quintana Roo	Daniela Díaz Rodríguez	22	1.71	Chetumal
San Luis Potosí	Sarahí Carrillo Garza	21	1.77	San Luis Potosí
Sinaloa	Gabriela Quintero Martínez	18	1.77	Los Mochis
Sonora	Gabriela Bórquez Lacy	19	1.79	Cd. Obregón
Sonora	Lorena Camargo Miranda	22	1.73	Cd. Obregón
Tamaulipas	Ana Karén Gonzáles Abdala	20	1.72	Nuevo Laredo
Tlaxcala	Stephanie López Rosas	22	1.72	Apizaco
Veracruz	Fabiola Pinal Montesinos	21	1.74	Córdoba
Yucatán	Anabel Solís Sosa	21	1.80	Mérida
Zacatecas	Verónica Llamas Sánchez	22	1.72	Nochistlán

== Replacements ==
- Tamaulipas - Melissa Solano was the winner of Nuestra Belleza Tamaulipas 2009. The Suplente/1st Runner-up, Ana Karen González was who represented Tamaulipas in Nuestra Belleza México 2009. Melissa Solano was dethroned from the band and crown without clarifying the causes.

== Designates ==
- Chiapas - Mildreth Jiménez
- Jalisco - Sandra Luz Vargas
- Querétaro - Paulina Cabrera
- Sonora - Gabriela Bórquez

== Returning states ==
- Last competed in 2004:
  - Tlaxcala
- Last competed in 2007:
  - (State of Mexico) Estado de México
  - Quintana Roo

== Withdrawals ==
- Hidalgo
- Tabasco

== Significance ==
- Jalisco won the Nuestra Belleza México in 2008 and 2009 (second in Nuestra Belleza México's History)
- Yucatán won the Nuestra Belleza Mundo México title for the first time.
- Zacatecas was the Suplente/1st Runner-up for the first time.
- For the second time a Titleholders were dethroned to the title (Verónica Llamas, Nuestra Belleza Zacatecas 2009 and Melissa Solano Nuestra Belleza Tamaulipas 2009).
- This was the last time the delegates made an opening singing a medley of the host state.
- Estado de México and Quintana Roo return to competition after two years (2007) and Tlaxcala after five years (2004).
- Jalisco placed for sixth consecutive year in the Top 5.
- Sinaloa placed for second consecutive year in the Top 5.
- Jalisco and Nuevo León placed for seventh consecutive year.
- Sonora placed for fourth consecutive year.
- Chiapas placed for third consecutive year.
- Aguascalientes, Baja California, Querétaro and Sinaloa placed for second consecutive year.
- Estado de México returned to making calls to the semifinals after six years (2003), Zacatecas after four years (2005), Coahuila after three years (2006), Chihuahua, Distrito Federal and Yucatán after two years (2007).
- States that were called to the semifinals last year and this year failed to qualify were Baja California Sur, Guanajuato, San Luis Potosí and Tabasco.
- For the fourth time Ernesto Laguardia hosted Nuestra Belleza México, and for the first time with Marisol González, Alma San Martín and Sebastian Rulli.
- Sinaloa won Miss Top Model for second time (before 2008).
- Zacatecas won Contestants' Choice for the first time.
- Chihuahua won Miss Talent for the first time.
- Querétaro won Miss Sports for the first time.
- Jalisco won the Academic Award for the first time and Fuller Beauty Queen for second time (before 2008).
- Nuevo León won the Steps to Fame Award for the first time.
- Coahuila won Personality Fraiche Award for the first time.
- Yucatán won Best National Costume for third time (before 2001 and 2007) and Sensodyne Waitening Award for the first time.
- The host delegate, Anabel Solís from Yucatán, won the Nuestra Belleza Mundo México title.
- Yucatán (Anabel Solís) is the higher delegate in this edition (1.81 m).
- Michoacán (Itzel García) is the lower delegate in this edition (1.70 m).

== Contestants notes ==
- Aguascalientes - Abigaíl González was Princess in Reina Nacional de la Feria de San Marcos 2008 in Aguascalientes.
- Chiapas - Claudia Espinoza competed in World Miss University 2008, finishing as 4th Runner-up. It was celebrated in Korea. Also she was elected to represent Mexico in Miss Tourism International 2011 but she didn't place.
- Colima - Giannina Huerta competed in Miss Tourism Queen of the Year International 2010 in China representing Mexico where she was a semifinalist in the Top 15 and won Miss Photogenic award. She was the Local Director of Nuestra Belleza Colima 2010 - 2013.
- Jalisco - Ximena Navarrete was named Miss Universe 2010 at the Mandalay Bay Events Center in the Mandalay Bay Resort and Casino, Las Vegas, Nevada, United States on August 23, 2010, making her the second Mexican delegate to win the title, after Lupita Jones in 1991. Both were crowned in Las Vegas. On February 10, 2011, she became the official face of L'Oreal Paris and Old Navy. During her reign, Navarrete traveled to Spain, Mexico, Indonesia, China, France, India, Russia, Dominican Republic, Puerto Rico, Panama, Thailand, Brazil, Guatemala, Chile and Bahamas in addition to numerous trips around the United States.
- Nuevo León - Adriana Treviño had been the 3rd Runner-up in Nuestra Belleza Nuevo León 2008. After to compete in Nuestra Belleza México she was moved to Mexico City to work as a Professional Model.
- San Luis Potosí - Sarahí Carrillo competed in the first Reina Internacional del Transporte pageant in Duitama, Colombia in January 2010 where she was finalist in the Top 6. Also she competed in Miss Latin America 2010 held on June 5, 2010, in Punta Cana, Dominican Republic where she was the 2nd Runner-up. She is a professional model in the Baxt Agency.
- Yucatán - Anabel Solís competed in Miss World 2010 held in Crown of Beauty Theatre in Sanya, People's Republic of China on October 30, 2010, but she didn't place. She failed to make the semifinalists, ending Mexico's six year streak of consecutive placements in Miss World, from 2004 through 2009.
- Zacatecas - Verónica Llamas was dethroned as Nuestra Belleza Zacatecas 2009 for posing topless in a magazine for men, so breaking a clause in the contract of Nuestra Belleza México, she also lost the right to represent Mexico in Miss Continente Americano 2010 held in Guayaquil, Ecuador, and her replacement was Karla Carrillo.

=== Crossovers ===
Contestants who had competed or will compete at other beauty pageants:

Miss Universe

- 2010: Jalisco: Ximena Navarrete (Winner)

Miss World

- 2010: Yucatán: Anabel Solis

Miss Latin America

- 2010: San Luis Potosí: Sarahí Carrillo(2nd Runner-up)

Miss Tourism International

- 2011: Chiapas: Claudia Espinoza (2nd Runner-up)

World Miss University

- 2008: Chiapas: Claudia Espinoza (4th Runner-up)

Reina Internacional del Transporte

- 2010: San Luis Potosí: Sarahí Carrillo (Top 6)

Miss Tourism Queen of the Year International

- 2010: Colima: Giannina Huerta (Top 15)

Reina de la Feria de San Marcos

- 2008: Aguascalientes: Abigaíl González (Princess)

Nuestra Belleza Nuevo León

- 2008: Nuevo León: Adriana Treviño (3rd Runner-up)
