= Nuestra Belleza México 2003 =

10th edition of the Nuestra Belleza México beauty pageant

- Date: September 5, 2003
- Presenters: Ernesto Laguardia
- Entertainment: Benny Ibarra, Marco Antonio Solis
- Venue: Teatro del Arte, Morelia, Michoacán, Mexico
- Broadcaster: Televisa
- Entrants: 38
- Placements: 20
- Withdrawals: Campeche, Coahuila, Chiapas, San Luis Potosí, Tabasco
- Returns: Baja California Sur, Estado de México, Guerrero
- Winner: Rosalva Luna; Sinaloa

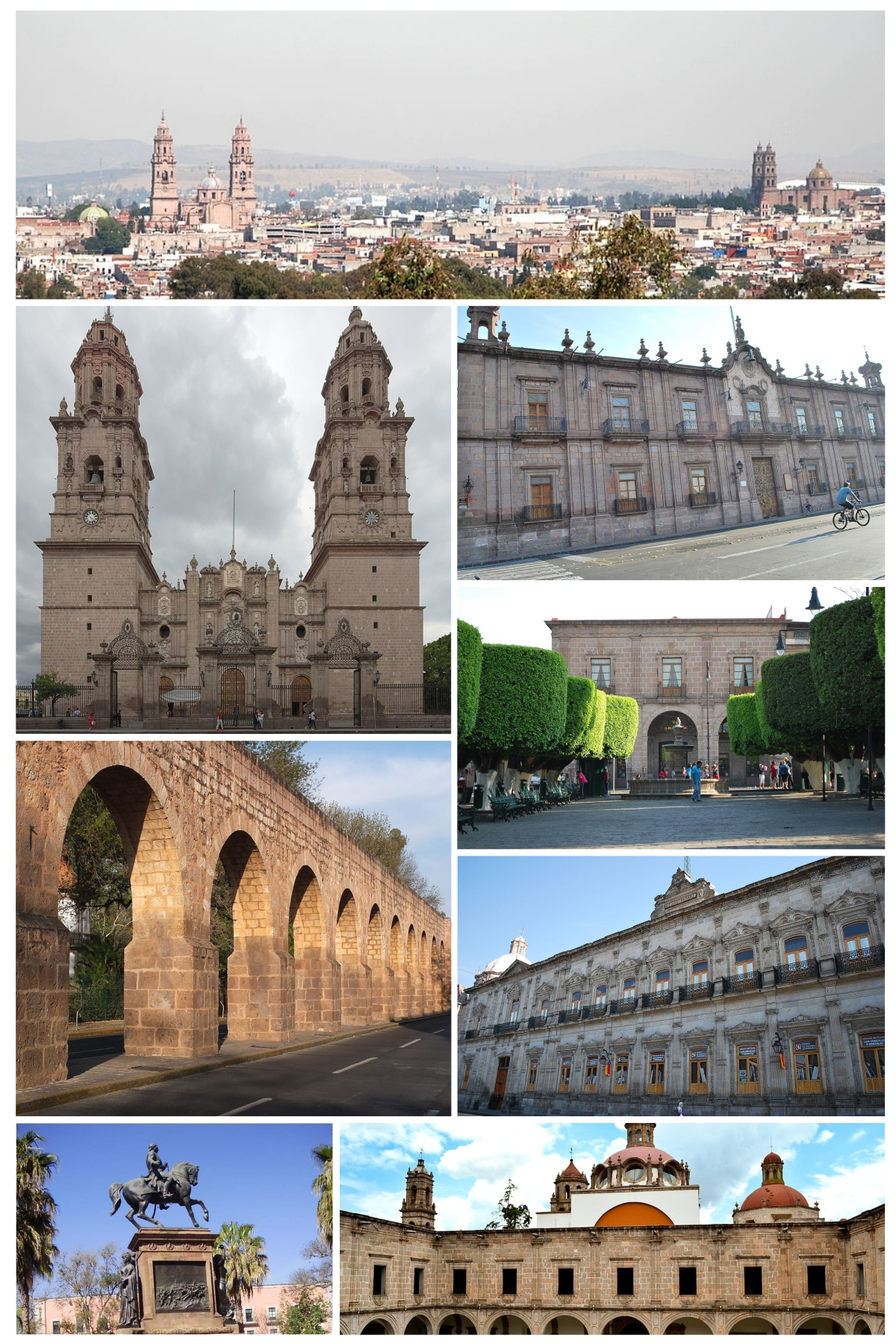
Collage of the city of Morelia, where the pageant was held

Nuestra Belleza México 2003, the 10th Nuestra Belleza México pageant, was held at the Teatro del Arte of Morelia, Michoacán, Mexico on September 5, 2003. Thirty-eight contestants of the Mexican Republic competed for the national title, which was won by Rosalva Luna from Sinaloa, who later competed in Miss Universe 2004 in Ecuador where she was a Semifinalist in the Top 15. Luna was crowned by outgoing Nuestra Belleza México titleholder Marisol González. She was the first Sinaloense to win this Title.

The Nuestra Belleza Mundo México title was won by Yessica Ramírez from Baja California, who later competed in Miss World 2004 in China where she was a Semifinalist in the Top 15. Ramírez was crowned by outgoing Nuestra Belleza Mundo México titleholder Blanca Zumárraga. She is the first and only Bajacaliforniana to win this title.

This year was established the "Corona al Mérito" award. Recognition is given each year to a Queen or ex-Queen of Nuestra Belleza México, for their work and/or trajectory dignify human values and the image of Mexican women in beauty contests, hoping to motivate them to excel day. The first prize winner of the "Corona al Mérito" went to Carolina Salinas, Nuestra Belleza Nuevo León 2002 and Miss Expo World 2002.

== Results ==
=== Placements ===
Final results	Contestant
Nuestra Belleza México 2003	Sinaloa - Rosalva Luna
Nuestra Belleza Mundo México 2003-04	Baja California - Yessica Ramírez
Suplente/1st Runner-up	Nuevo León - Alejandra Villanueva
2nd Runner-up	Durango - Jiapsi Bojórquez
3rd Runner-up	(Mexico City) Distrito Federal - Paulina Michelle
Top 10	Aguascalientes - Liliana Bejarano; Guanajuato - Rubí Valdés; Nuevo León - Alejandra Arredondo; Sonora - Amada Castillo; Zacatecas - Cecilia Magallanes
Top 20	(Chihuahua (state)) Chihuahua - Zuszeth Luna; (State of Mexico) Estado de México - Priscilla Bustillos; Jalisco - Ariadna Muro; Michoacán - Yaminah Márquez; Nuevo León - Brisseida Moya; Puebla - Loreli Cázares; Sonora - Laura Almada; Tamaulipas - Alejandra Celis; Tamaulipas - Yadira Patiño; Yucatán' - Marisol Rojas

=== Preliminary Competition ===
For the first time, the Preliminary Competition was held at the "Hoy" TV show a few days before of the final competition. Prior to the final telecast, all contestants competed in swimsuit during the preliminary competition, included corporal expression category.

In this program were chosen the Top 20 among the 38 candidates. Only the top 20 participated in the final night. The Preliminary Competition was hosted by Andrea Legarreta and Ernesto Laguardia.

The musical part was enlivened by: Belinda.

=== Order of announcements ===
In addition, the names of the semifinalists who would compete on the final night they met.

1. Nuevo León
2. Durango
3. Tamaulipas
4. Sonora
5. Nuevo León
6. Sinaloa
7. Sonora
8. Guanajuato
9. Jalisco
10. Tamaulipas
1. Nuevo León
2. Michoacán
3. Zacatecas
4. Baja California
5. Estado de México
6. Chihuahua
7. Distrito Federal
8. Aguascalientes
9. Puebla
10. Yucatán

=== Special awards ===
Award	Contestant
Miss Photogenic	Zacatecas - Ceciclia Magallanes
Fuller Beauty Queen	Nuevo León - Alejandra Villanueva
Lala Light Figure	Nuevo León - Alejandra Arredondo
Miss Internet	Sinaloa - Rosalva Luna
Best National Costume	Sinaloa - Rosalva Luna; "Riqueza Sinaloense"

== Judges ==
=== Preliminary Competition ===
- Liliana Abud - Writer and Actress
- Mara Patricia Castañeda - TV Hostess
- Lourdes Lusage
- Mauricio Peña
- Mario de la Regera
- Adriana César
- Francisco Mendoza
- Angel Papadopolus - Plastic Surgeon
- Willy Graw
- José Luis Reséndez - El Modelo México 2003

=== Final Competition ===
- Joss Ifergan - Stylist
- Ángel Papadopolus - Plastic Surgeon
- Cristina Pineda - Fashion Designer
- Guillermo Rojas - Automobile Broker
- Tatiana Rodríguez - Nuestra Belleza Mundo México 2001 & Actress
- Ana Margara Rodríguez - Professional Model
- Jan - Actor & Singer
- Gabriela Goldsmith - Actress
- René Casados - Actor & TV Host

== Background music ==
- Opening Number: "Medley of the host State" by Contestants
- Intermediate: "Vives en Mí", "Inspiración" by Benny Ibarra
- Intermediate: "Tu Amor o tu Desprecio" by Marco Antonio Solis
- Crowning Moment: "Nuestra Belleza México" (Official Theme)

== Contestants ==
State	Contestant	Age	Height (m)	Hometown
Aguascalientes	Liliana Leticia Bejarano González	22	1.76	Aguascalientes
Baja California	Yessica Guadalupe Ramírez Meza	21	1.83	Tijuana
Baja California Sur	Gabriela Berenice Martínez Cota	19	1.79	La Paz
Colima	Karina Gutiérrez Verduzco	20	1.75	Colima
(Chihuahua (state)) Chihuahua	Karla Becerra Armigo	21	1.77	Cd. Juárez
(Chihuahua (state)) Chihuahua	Zuszeth Luna González	23	1.74	Cd. Juárez
(Mexico City) Distrito Federal	Paulina Michelle Alatorre	22	1.80	Mexico City
Durango	Jiapsi Bojórquez Martínez	20	1.73	Durango
Durango	Karla María Ayala Ortíz	22	1.72	Durango
(State of Mexico) Estado de México	Priscila Bustillos Larrañaga	22	1.78	Toluca
Guanajuato	Esther Alejandra Córdoba Toscano	21	1.74	León
Guanajuato	Norma González Barrón	22	1.75	León
Guanajuato	Rubí Valdés Silva	21	1.73	León
Guerrero	Lilian Cepeda Martínez	21	1.68	Iguala
(Hidalgo (state)) Hidalgo	Grisel Franco Rivera	20	1.79	Huejutla
Jalisco	Ariadna Muro Esquivel	22	1.72	Guadalajara
Jalisco	Gladys Anaya Martín	20	1.77	Guadalajara
Jalisco	Paola Topete Vela	21	1.70	Guadalajara
Michoacán	Yaminah Márquez Pérez	21	1.73	Yurécuaro
Morelos	Yolanda Leal Tenorio	21	1.76	Cuernavaca
Nayarit	Alejandra del Río López	20	1.70	Tepic
Nuevo León	Alejandra Arredondo Méndez	22	1.74	Monterrey
Nuevo León	Alejandra Villanueva Campos	20	1.70	Monterrey
Nuevo León	Brisseida Myrella Moya Leal	19	1.83	Santiago
Puebla	Beatríz Herrero Sin	20	1.70	Tehuacán
Puebla	Lorelí Cázares Zaragoza	23	1.73	Puebla
Querétaro	Ivonne Obando González	20	1.70	Querétaro
Quintana Roo	Maritza López Morales	22	1.71	Chetumal
Sinaloa	Rosalva Yazmín Luna Ruíz	21	1.76	Los Mochis
Sonora	Amada Castillo López	20	1.76	Hermosillo
Sonora	Laura Almada Ibarra	21	1.73	Navojoa
Tamaulipas	Alejandra Celis Renero	22	1.75	Cd. Victoria
Tamaulipas	Yadira Patiño Cardoza	22	1.75	Matamoros
Tlaxcala	Renata Medina Soto	22	1.75	Tlaxcala
Veracruz	Ana Paola Pantoja Pola	21	1.75	Veracruz
Yucatán	Marisol Rojas Avila	20	1.70	Mérida
Zacatecas	Cecilia Magallanes López	20	1.76	Zacatecas
Zacatecas	Mariana Delgado Osuna	20	1.72	Zacatecas

== Designates ==
- Chihuahua - Karla Beceraa
- Durango - Karla Ayála
- Guanajuato - Esther Alejandra Córdova
- Guanajuato - Norma González
- Jalisco - Gladyas Anaya
- Jalisco - Paola Topete
- Nuevo León - Alejandra Arredondo
- Nuevo León - Brisseida Moya
- Puebla - Lorelí Cázarez
- Querétaro - Grisel Franco
- Sonora - Amada Castillo
- Tamaulipas - Yadira Patiño
- Zacatecas - Cecilia Magallanes

== Returning states ==
- Last competed in 1999:
  - Guerrero
- Last competed in 2001:
  - Baja California Sur
  - (State of Mexico) Estado de México

== Withdrawals ==
- Campeche
- Coahuila
- Chiapas
- San Luis Potosí
- Tabasco

== Significance ==
- Sinaloa won the Nuestra Belleza México title for the first time.
- Baja California won the Nuestra Belleza Mundo México title for the first time.
- Nuevo León was the Suplente/1st Runner-up for the first time.
- This was the fourth time a Winner of Nuestra Belleza México pageant is not born in the state that represents, (Yessica Ramírez was born in Culiacán, Sinaloa).
- For the first time Coahuila, Chiapas, San Luis Potosí and Tabasco retires from competition.
- Baja California Sur and Estado de México return to competition after three year (2001) and Guerrero after four years (1999).
- Chiahuahua placed for sixth consecutive year.
- Sonora and Tamaulipas placed for fifth consecutive year
- Yucatán placed for fourth consecutive year.
- Puebla placed for second consecutive year.
- Michoacán placed for the first time.
- Baja California, Durango and Estado de México returned to making calls to the semifinals after six years (1997), Aguascalientes after four years (1999), Zacatecas after three years (2000), Distrito Federal, Guanajuato, Nuevo León and Jalisco after two years (2001).
- States that were called to the semifinals last year and this year failed to qualify were Morelos, Querétaro and Veracruz.
- For the first time Ernesto Laguardia hosted the pageant.
- Zacatecas won Miss Photogenic for the first time.
- Nuevo León won Fuller Beauty Queen and Lala Light Figure Award for the first time.
- Sinaloa won the Best National Costume for the second time (after 1994)
- The host delegate, Yaminah Márquez from Michoacán, placed to semifinals.
- Baja California (Yessia Ramírez) and Nuevo León (Brisseida Moya) are the higher delegates in this edition (1.83 m).
- Guerrero (Lilián Cepeda) is the lower delegate in this edition (1.68 m).

== Contestants notes ==
- Baja California - Yessica Ramírez represented Mexico in Miss World 2004 held at the Crown of Beauty Theatre, Sanya, People's Republic of China on December 6, 2004. She got a direct pass amongst the top 15 by being awarded the Miss World Top Model award for 2004. She also took Mexico back to be part of the semifinalists after a 7-year drought of no placement, from here on Mexico classified consecutively. She was born in Culiacán, Sinaloa.
- Guanajuato - Alejandra Córdoba represented Mexico in Miss Teen Mayan World 2003.
- Guanajuato - Norma González represented Mexico in Miss Expo World 2003 where she won the Miss Personality award. Also she competed in Miss Pacific of the World 2007 where she won 1st Place.
- Nuevo León - Brisseida Moya represented Mexico in the Reinado Internacional del Café 2004 in Manizales, Colombia.
- Puebla - Beatríz Herrero is sister of Irantzu Herrero, designated of Puebla in Nuestra Belleza México 2005.
- Sinaloa - Rosalva Luna ranked on the top 15 in Miss Universe 2004 held in Centro de Convenciones CEMEXPO in Guayaquil, Ecuador, ending Mexico's 4-year drought without any placement, from here on Mexico classified consecutively until Karla Carrillo, who didn't qualify to semifinals in Miss Universe 2009.
- Tamaulipas - Alejandra Celis is sister of Adriana Celis, Nuestra Belleza Tamaulipas 2006.
- Tamaulipas - Yadira Patiño competed in the contest Miss Latin America 2008 held in Punta Cana, Dominican Republic representing Mexico, ended up as a semifinalist. Also she competed in Miss Atlántico Internacional 2008 in Punta del Este, Uruguay but she didn't place.
- Yucatán - Marisol Rojas won the Title of Miss Costa Maya International 2004 held in Belize representing Mexico.

=== Crossovers ===
Contestants who had competed or will compete at other beauty pageants:

Miss Universe

- 2004: Sinaloa: Rosalva Luna (Top 15)

Miss World

- 2004: Baja California: Yessica Ramírez (Top 15)

Miss Latin America

- 2008: Tamaulipas: Yadira Patiño (Top 12)

Miss Atlántico Internacional

- 2008: Tamaulipas: Yadira Patiño

Reinado Internacional del Café

- 2004: Nuevo León: Brisseida Moya (Top 10)

Miss Costa Maya International

- 2004: Yucatán: Marisol Rojas (Winner)

Miss Pacific of the World

- 2007: Guanajuato: Norma González (Winner)

Miss Expo World

- 2003: Guanajuato: Norma González

Miss Teen Mayan World

- 2003: Guanajuato: Alejandra Córdoba
