= Nuestra Belleza Sinaloa 2010 =

- Date: August 13, 2010
- Venue: Canal 3, Culiacán, Sinaloa
- Broadcaster: Televisa
- Entrants: 12
- Placements: 5
- Winner: Tiaré Oliva

Nuestra Belleza Sinaloa 2010, was held in Canal 3, Culiacán, Sinaloa on August 13, 2010. At the conclusion of the final night of competition, Tiaré Oliva of Topolobampo was crowned the winner. Oliva was crowned by outgoing Nuestra Belleza Sinaloa titleholder, Gabriela Quintero. Twelve contestants competed for the state title.

== Results ==
=== Placements ===
Final results	Contestant
Nuestra Belleza Sinaloa 2010	Tiaré Oliva
Suplente / 1st Runner-up	Marisol Chiquete
Finalists	Jovana Gutiérrez; Karen Martínez; Yolanda Nevárez

== Judges ==
- Ana Laura Corral - National Coordinator of Nuestra Belleza México
- Emma Lucía Aragón - Nuestra Belleza Sinaloa 2004
- Patricia Bojers - Contests Regional Coordinator of Nuestra Belleza México
- Rosalva Luna - Nuestra Belleza México 2003

== Contestants ==
Hometown	Contestant	Age	Height (m)
Culiacán	Ana María Burboa García	20	1.71
Culiacán	Damaris Margarita Gerardo Camacho	23	1.71
Culiacán	Karen Graciela Martínez Hernández	22	1.72
Culiacán	Marisol Chiquete Portillo	22	1.72
Culiacán	Paulina Valenzuela Ramos	21	1.70
Culiacán	Vanessa Galindo	23	1.75
Los Mochis	Glorelia Pellegrini Morán	21	1.78
Los Mochis	Jovana Lizeth Gutiérrez	23	1.71
Mazatlán	Haby Annabel Perales Nava	23	1.70
Mazatlán	Yolanda Guadalupe Nevarez Varela	23	1.73
Topolobampo	Brianda Yanet Félix Rodríguez	18	1.70
Topolobampo	Tiaré Kristal Olivia Elguezabal	18	1.79
