= Nuestra Belleza México 2002 =

9th edition of the Nuestra Belleza México beauty pageant

- Date: September 6, 2002
- Presenters: René Casados, Jacqueline Bracamontes
- Entertainment: Benny Ibarra, Kabah, Pedro Fernández
- Venue: World Trade Center, Boca del Río, Veracruz, Mexico
- Broadcaster: Televisa
- Entrants: 33
- Placements: 12
- Withdrawals: Baja California Sur, State of Mexico
- Returns: Michoacán, Quintana Roo
- Winner: Marisol González; Coahuila

Nuestra Belleza México 2002, the 9th Nuestra Belleza México pageant, was held at the World Trade Center of Boca del Río, Veracruz, Mexico on September 6, 2002. Thirty-three contestants of the Mexican Republic competed for the national title, which was won by Marisol González from Coahuila, who later competed in Miss Universe 2003 in Panama. González was crowned by outgoing Nuestra Belleza México titleholder Ericka Cruz and Christiane Martel Miss Universe 1953. She is the first and only Coahuilense to win this title.

The Nuestra Belleza Mundo México title was won by Blanca Zumárraga from Puebla, who later competed in Miss World 2002 in United Kingdom. Zumárraga was crowned by outgoing Nuestra Belleza Mundo México titleholder Tatiana Rodríguez. She was the first Poblana to win this title.

Erika Honstein from Sonora was selected by Lupita Jones to compete in Miss World 2003 in China. In an internal competition between five girls, since international competition changed dates and Lupita Jones had just two months to prepare the Mexican representative being that had not yet been chosen as the representative for this competition in 2003. And then the next year 2003 the two Beauty Queens compete in contests of 2004. She is the first and only Sonorense to win this title for designation.

This year Christiane Martel attended Miss Universe 1953, and received a tribute at the event.

== Results ==
=== Placements ===
Final results	Contestant
Nuestra Belleza México 2002	Coahuila – Marisol González
Nuestra Belleza Mundo México 2002	Puebla – Blanca Zumárraga
Suplente/1st Runner-up	Morelos – Paulina Almada
2nd Runner-up	Sonora – Erika Honstein
3rd Runner-up	Yucatán – María José Rosado
Top 12	(Chihuahua (state)) Chihuahua – Alejandra Oates; Querétaro – Michelle Glenn; Sonora – María Félix; Tabasco – Ana Karina Álvarez; Tamaulipas – Argentina de Luna; Tamaulipas – Miriam Ferro; Veracruz – Kaztenny de la Vega

=== Order of announcements ===
==== Top 12 ====
1. Tabasco
2. Puebla
3. Sonora
4. Chihuahua
5. Querétaro
6. Tamaulipas
7. Veracruz
8. Yucatán
9. Sonora
10. Coahuila
11. Tamaulipas
12. Morelos

==== Top five ====
1. Puebla
2. Sonora
3. Yucatán
4. Coahuila
5. Morelos

=== Special awards ===
Award	Contestant
Miss Photogenic	Morelos – Paulina Almada
Lala Light Figure	Morelos – Paulina Almada
Playtex Silhouette	Coahuila – Marisol González
Best National Costume	Campeche – Diana Rodríguez; "Jal-Há, Orilla de mar"

=== Internal election headed for Miss World 2003 ===
In an internal competition between five girls (ex-queens), since international competition changed dates and Lupita Jones had just two months to prepare the Mexican representative being that had not yet been chosen as the representative for this competition in 2003.

Final results	Contestant
Nuestra Belleza Mundo México 2003	Sonora – Erika Honstein
Finalists	Nuestra Belleza Quintana Roo 2000 – Lilián Villanueva; Nuestra Belleza Sonora 2001 – Erika Peña; Nuestra Belleza Yucatán 2002 – María José Rosado

== Judges ==
They were the same judges at the Preliminary and Final Competition.

- Uriel Santana – Photographer & Painter
- Laura Spitia – Specialist Fashion
- José Alberto Castr – TV Producer
- Liliana Abud – Writer
- Blanca Soto – Nuestra Belleza Mundo México 1997, Miss Verano Viña del Mar 1997, Model & Actress
- René Strickler – Actor
- Angélica Rivera – Actress
- Leonardo Leo's – Makeup Artist

== Background music ==
- Intermediate: "El Cielo en tu Mirada" by Benny Ibarra
- Intermediate: "Vete Lejos" by Kabah
- Intermediate: "La Otra" by Pedro Fernández

== Contestants ==
State	Contestant	Age	Height (m)	Hometown
Aguascalientes	Mariel Ramírez Pérez	20	1.78	Aguascalientes
Baja California	Cristhia Michelle Cuevas Herrera	21	1.68	Tijuana
Campeche	Diana Juárez Rodríguez De la Gala	19	1.69	Campeche
Coahuila	Marisol González Casas	20	1.72	Torreón
Colima	Edith Marisol García Hernández	21	1.75	Colima
Chiapas	Fanny Sesma Melgar	20	1.73	Tapachula
(Chihuahua (state)) Chihuahua	Gabriela Alejandra Oates Urias	21	1.75	Chihuahua
(Chihuahua (state)) Chihuahua	Mónica Lizeth Cervantes Cuellar	24	1.78	Cd. Juárez
(Mexico City) Distrito Federal	Alejandra González Martin	19	1.70	Mexico City
Durango	Sofía Ramos Gutiérrez	19	1.71	Durango
Guanajuato	María Vanessa Cisneros Lozano	23	1.71	León
(Hidalgo (state)) Hidalgo	Verónica Graciela Reyes Cerda	20	1.68	Pachuca
Jalisco	Cecilia de Jesús Gutiérrez Avilés	19	1.75	Guadalajara
Jalisco	Beatríz García Barragán	22	1.72	Guadalajara
Michoacán	Angélica Navarrete Higareda	21	1.74	Sahuayo
Morelos	Paulina Almada Rojas	21	1.72	Cuernavaca
Nayarit	Estrella Guadalupe Morales Guzmán	21	1.76	Compostela
Nuevo León	Carolina Salinas González	20	1.71	Santiago
Puebla	Blanca Rosalía Zumárraga Contreras	21	1.82	Puebla
Querétaro	Joan Michelle Glenn Garza	20	1.78	Querétaro
Quintana Roo	Diana Franco Padilla	19	1.73	Cancún
San Luis Potosí	Michelle Josefina Teniente Avilés	23	1.70	San Luis Potosí
Sinaloa	Claudia Karina Cota Gastelum	21	1.69	Culiacán
Sonora	Elizabeth Palacio Nuñez	19	1.75	Puerto Peñasco
Sonora	María del Carmen Félix Espinoza	19	1.74	Hermosillo
Sonora	Erika Lizeth Honstein García	21	1.80	Hermosillo
Tabasco	Ana Karina Álvarez May	20	1.72	Villahermosa
Tamaulipas	Miriam Ferro Romero	21	1.73	Tampico
Tamaulipas	Karla Argentina De Luna Flores	20	1.74	Reynosa
Tlaxcala	Mariana Acevedo Lobato	22	1.69	Tlaxcala
Veracruz	Kaztenny De la Vega Vázquez	22	1.68	Poza Rica
Yucatán	María José Rosado Solís	20	1.75	Mérida
Zacatecas	Thelma Patricia Martínez Guajardo	21	1.70	Zacatecas

== Designates ==
- Chihuahua – Alejandra Oates
- Jalisco – Cecilia Gutiérrez
- Sonora - Erika Honstein
- Sonora – María Félix
- Tamaulipas – Argentina de Luna

== Returning states ==
- Last competed in 1999:
  - Michoacán
- Last competed in 2000:
  - Quintana Roo

== Withdrawals ==
- Baja California Sur
- State of Mexico

== Significance ==
- Coahuila won the Nuestra Belleza México title for the first time.
- Puebla won the Nuestra Belleza Mundo México title for the first time.
- Morelos was the Suplente/1st Runner-up for the first time.
- This was the third time a Winner of Nuestra Belleza México pageant is not born in the state that represents, (Blanca Zumárraga was born in Córdoba, Veracruz).
- Sonora was appointed as Nuestra Belleza Mundo México 2003 in a recess appointment by Lupita Jones when the Miss World pageant's schedule changed.
- For the first time the delegates made an opening singing a medley of the host State, this was done until 2009.
- This year eliminated the choice of Nuestra Belleza Mundo México in preliminary competition entitled "Nuestra Belleza Mexico: Camino Miss Mundo" and to date in the final night two queens are chosen.
- For the first time Baja California Sur and State of Mexico retires from competition.
- Michoacán return to competition after three years (1999) and Quintana Roo after two years (2000).
- Chihuahua placed for fifth consecutive year.
- Sonora and Tamaulipas placed for fourth consecutive year.
- Coahuila, Yucatán and Veracruz placed for third consecutive yaar.
- Puebla and Tabasco returned to making calls to the semi-finals after four years (1998), Morelos after three years (1999) and Querétaro after two years (2000).
- States that were called to the semi-finals last year and this year failed to qualify were Campeche, Distrito Federal, Guanajuato, Jalisco, Nuevo León and Sinaloa.
- Distrito Federal and Nuevo León broke the streak came classifications obtained from the first competition in 1994, these being the states with more classifications in the final with eight.
- This was the only time that Nuevo León did not qualify to the semi-finals, this being the only State with more ratings in the history of the pageant.
- For the first time René Casados hosted the pageant with Jacqueline Bracamontes.
- Morelos won Miss Photogenic and Lala Light Figure Award for the first time.
- Coahuila won the Playntex Silhouette Award for the first time.
- Campeche won the Best National Costume for second time (before 1999).
- The host delegate, Kasteny de la Vega from Veracruz, placed to the semi-finals.
- Puebla (Blanca Zumárraga) is the higher delegate in this edition (1.82 m).
- Baja California (Michelle Cuevas), Hidalgo (Verónica Reyes), Michoacán (Angélica Navarrete), Veracruz (Kasteny de la Vega) and Zacatecas (Thelma Martínez) are the lower delegates in this edition (1.68 m).

== Contestant notes ==
- Campeche – Diana Juárez is twin sister of Samantha Juárez, Campeche's representative in 2000. Also she competed in Miss Costa Maya International 2003, but she didn't place.
- Coahuila – Marisol González competed in Miss Universe 2003 held at Figali Convention Center, Panama City, Panama on June 3, 2003, despite her being a favorite for the crown, she failed to qualify for semi-finals. She made her debut as an actress in the telenovela Contra Viento y Marea in 2005. Marisol is currently one of the beautiful faces in Televisa Deportes.
- Nuevo León – Carolina Salinas is the only representative of the state designated by a casting and not a competition and the only representative that managed to sneak the group of semi-finalists nationwide. Also she was the last state to be elected Queen, the Nuevo León state organization was going through a crisis. Days before her coronation in Nuevo León, had an accident which caused a crack in the ankle, which is realized in the national rally which made it impossible to walk, so that the presentation to the television paraded in chair wheel. Later participated in the international contest Miss Expo World 2002 held in Guatemala City, Guatemala where she won the 1st Place. She was the Local Director of Nuestra Belleza Nuevo León in 2003.
- Puebla – Blanca Zumárraga represented her country in Miss World 2002, held at Alexandra Palace, London, United Kingdom on December 7, 2002, but she didn't place. She was born in Veracruz.
- Sonora – Elizabeth Palacio is sister of Laura Palacio Nuestra Belleza Sonora 2011.
- Sonora – Erika Honstein was selected by Lupita Jones to compete in Miss World 2003 held at Crown of Beauty Theatre, Sanya, People's Republic of China on December 6, 2003. She was appointed the national title in a recess appointment by Lupita Jones when the Miss World pageant's schedule changed. Also she was Miss Mesoamerica Mexico 2003 and was 2nd Runner-up in Miss Mesoamerica 2003 where she obtained the Miss Personality award. In 2004 she joined the CEA of Televisa, graduating in 2006. She has participated in soap operas like "Mundo de Fieras" and "La Fea Más Bella". Serves on the news program "Matutino Express", which holds the climate section and channel Ritmoson Latino, is the former host of the "Espacio Latino".
- Sonora – María Félix Espinoza represented Mexico in the annual Reinado Internacional del Café 2003 in Manizales, Colombia.
- Yucatán – María José Rosado represented Mexico in the Reinado Internacional de las Flores 2003 where she won the Best National Costume award. Also in 2005 she was 1st Runner-up in Miss Costa Maya International. In 2006 she was elected Reina del Carnaval in Mérida, Yucatán. Actually she es TV hostess and actress in TV Azteca and top model.

=== Crossovers ===
Contestants who had competed or will compete at other beauty pageants:

Miss Universe

- 2003: Coahuila: Marisol González

Miss World

- 2002: Puebla: Blanca Zumárraga
- 2003: Sonora: Erika Honstein

Reinado Internacional de las Flores

- 2003: Yucatán: María José Rosado

Reinado Internacional del Café

- 2003: Sonora: María Félix Espinoza

Miss Costa Maya International

- 2003: Campeche: Diana Juarez
- 2005: Yucatán: María José Rosado (1st Runner-up)

Miss Mesoamérica

- 2003: Sonora: Erika Honstein (2nd Runner-up)

Miss Expo World

- 2002: Nuevo León: Carolina Salinas (Winner)

Reina del Carnaval Mérida

- 2006: Yucatán: María José Rosado (Winner)
