= Mexicana Universal San Luis Potosí =

- Formation: 1994 (as Nuestra Belleza San Luis Potosí); 2017 (as Mexicana Universal San Luis Potosí)
- Type: Beauty Pageant
- Headquarters: San Luis Potosí
- Location: Mexico
- Local Coordinator: Ely Armenta

Mexicana Universal San Luis Potosí (until 2016 called Nuestra Belleza San Luis Potosí) is a state-level contest in the state of San Luis Potosí, Mexico, which selects the state representative for the national contest Mexicana Universal (formerly called Nuestra Belleza México), thus aspiring to represent the country internationally on one of the platforms offered.

The state organization has achieved the following results since 1994:

- Winner: 1 (2019)
- Top 10/11/12: 3 (2004, 2012, 2025)
- Top 15/16: 4 (1995, 2008, 2017, 2021)
- Top 20/21: 2 (2000, 2018)
- Unplaced: 17 (1994, 1996, 1997, 1998, 1999, 2001, 2002, 2006, 2007, 2009, 2010, 2011, 2013, 2014, 2016, 2022, 2023)
- Absences: 3 (2003, 2005, 2015)

== National Queens ==
- Karen Bustos - Mexicana Charm 2021

== Titleholders ==
The following are the names of the annual winners of Mexicana Universal San Luis Potosí, listed in ascending order, as well as their results during the national Mexicana Universal pageant. State queens who represented the country in a current or past franchise of the national organization are also highlighted in a specific color.

Current Franchises:

- Competed at Miss Grand International.
- Competed at Miss International.
- Competed at Miss Charm.
- Competed at Reina Hispanoamericana.
- Competed at Miss Orb International.
- Competed at Nuestra Latinoamericana Universal.

Former Franchises:

- Competed at Miss Universe.
- Competed at Miss World.
- Competed at Miss Continente Americano.
- Competed at Miss Costa Maya International.
- Competed at Miss Atlántico Internacional.
- Competed at Miss Verano Viña del Mar.
- Competed at Reina Internacional del Café.
- Competed at Reina Internacional de las Flores.
- Competed at Señorita Continente Americano.
- Competed at Nuestra Belleza Internacional.

Year	Titleholder	Hometown	Placement	Special Award	Notes
2025	María Lucía Ortega Ruiz	Soledad de Graciano Sánchez	Top 12	-	Top 10 at Miss Eco International 2024; Miss Eco México 2024; Miss Earth México-Water 2023; Miss Earth San Luis Potosí 2023; Reina de la Feria Nacional de la Enchilada 2022; Embajadora at Reina de la Feria Nacional Potosina 2019
2024	In 2024, due to changes in the dates of the national pageant, the election of the state queens was postponed for one year.				
2023	Geraldine Machado Argüelles; Resigned from her state title due to the postponement of the national pageant.	Ciudad Valles	Did not Compete	-	1st Runner-up at Miss Europe Continental México 2019; Top 16 at Mexicana Universal 2018; Mexicana Universal San Luis Potosí 2017; Reina de la Feria Nacional de la Huasteca Potosina 2016; Competed at Elite Model Look México 2011; Irma Argüelles' daughter, Señorita San Luis Potosí 1986
2023	Ximena Oralia González Azanza; Withdrew from the national competition due to the postponement of the national pageant.	Rioverde	Did not Compete	-	Competed at Mexicana Universal San Luis Potosí 2022
2023	América López Luna (Assumed)	San Ciro de Acosta	-	-	Competed at Universal México 2024; Universal San Luis Potosí 2024; Top 10 at Reina de la Feria Nacional Potosina 20224
2022	Romina Esther Sandoval Gutiérrez	Ciudad Valles	-	-	Reina de la Feria Nacional de la Huasteca Potosina 2022; Reina de Ciudad Valles 2022
2021	Aranza Laguna Rodríguez	San Luis Potosí	Top 15	-	-
2020	In 2020, due to the contingency of COVID-19 there was a lag in the year of the state contest				
2019	Ana Luisa Martínez Coronado (Resigned)	Matehuala	Did not Compete	-	Competed at Nuestra Belleza San Luis Potosí 2014
2019	Ana Karen Bustos González (Assumed)	San Luis Potosí	Mexicana Charm	-	2nd Runner-up at Miss Universe México 2024; Miss Universe San Luis Potosí 2024; Top 20 at Miss Charm 2023; Competed at Miss Earth 2017; Miss Earth México 2017; Miss Earth San Luis Potosí 2017
2018	Aurora Mancilla Castro	San Luis Potosí	Top 20	-	Reina Turismo México 2017; Reina Turismo San Luis Potosí 2017
2017	Geraldine Machado Argüelles	Ciudad Valles	Top 16	-	Mexicana Universal San Luis Potosí 2023; 1st Runner-up at Miss Europe Continental México 2019; Reina de la Feria Nacional de la Huasteca Potosina 2016; Competed at Elite Model Look México 2011; Irma Argüelles' daughter, Señorita San Luis Potosí 1986
Until 2016 the Title was Nuestra Belleza San Luis Potosí
2016	María Fernanda Zepeda Villarreal	San Luis Potosí	-	-	-
2015	No candidate was sent				
2014	Azucena Moro Viveros	San Luis Potosí	-	-	-
2013	Alejandra Wallen Flores	San Luis Potosí	-	-	-
2012	Verónica Sánchez Alonso	San Luis Potosí	Top 10	Miss Top Model	Miss San Luis Potosí 2016; Competed at Miss F1 México 2015; 5th Runner-up at Mexico's Next Top Model 2009
2011	Lorena Alvarado Zermeño	San Luis Potosí	-	-	-
2010	Carmen Isabel Hernández Chávez	San Luis Potosí	-	-	Miss Princess of the World 2011; Miss Princess of the World México 2011; 2nd Runner-up at Reina Internacional del Joropo 2011; Reina del Joropo México 2011; Reina Internacional del Transporte 2011; Reina del Transporte México 2011
2009	Sarahí Carrillo Garza	San Luis Potosí	-	-	2nd Runner-up at Miss América Latina del Mundo 2010; Miss América Latina México 2010; Top 6 at Reina Internacional del Transporte 2010; Reina del Transporte México 2010
2008	Lenny Meade de León	San Luis Potosí	Top 15	-	-
2007	Karla García Tejada	San Luis Potosí	-	-	-
2006	Daniela Gonzalez Escobar	San Luis Potosí	-	-	-
2005	No candidate was sent				
2004	Ana Sofía Escobosa González	San Luis Potosí	Top 10	-	-
2003	No candidate was sent				
2002	Michelle Josefina Teniente Avilés	San Luis Potosí	-	-	-
2001	Claudia Calvillo Martínez	San Luis Potosí	-	-	-
2000	Marisel Puebla Juárez	San Luis Potosí	Top 20	Best National Costume	Top 20 at Nuestra Belleza Mundo México 2000
1999	Ana María Iglesias Núñez	San Luis Potosí	-	-	-
1998	María Cristina Ramírez Portales	San Luis Potosí	-	-	-
1997	Mayra Sandoval Martínez	San Luis Potosí	-	-	-
1996	Gloria de la Garza Hernández	San Luis Potosí	-	-	-
1995	Katya Mercedes Michel de la Torre	San Luis Potosí	Top 16	Miss Dorian Grey	-
1994	Eleane Eguía Valdéz	San Luis Potosí	-	-	-

== Designated Contestants ==
Starting in 2000, states were allowed to have more than one candidate, as some states were not sending candidates for various reasons. The following contestants from San Luis Potosí were invited to compete in the national pageant alongside the reigning queen, and in some cases, they achieved even better results.

Year	Titleholder	Hometown	Placement	Special Award	Notes
2010	Ana Paola Lastras Villaseñor	San Luis Potosí	-	-	1st Runner-up at Nuestra Belleza San Luis Potosí 2010

== See also ==
- Miss San Luis Potosí
