= Nuestra Belleza Yucatán 2010 =

- Date: July 17, 2010
- Presenters: Alejandro Rossel, Laura Castro
- Entertainment: Marco Di Mauro
- Venue: Club Libanés, Mérida, Yucatán
- Broadcaster: Televisa
- Entrants: 7
- Placements: 3
- Winner: María Fernanda López; Mérida

Nuestra Belleza Yucatán 2010, was a pageant held at the Club Libanés in Mérida, Yucatán on July 17, 2010. At the conclusion of the final night of competition María Fernanda López of Mérida was crowned the winner. López was crowned by outgoing Nuestra Belleza Yucatán titleholder and Nuestra Belleza Mundo México 2009 winner Anabel Solis. Seven contestants competed for the title.

== Results ==
=== Placements ===
| Final results | Contestant |
|---|---|
| Nuestra Belleza Yucatán 2011 | María Fernanda López |
| Suplente / 1st Runner-up | Alina García |
| 2nd Runner-up | Gabriela González |

== Background Music ==
- Marco Di Mauro

== Contestants ==
| Hometown | Contestant | Age |
|---|---|---|
| Mérida | Andrea Bernés | 20 |
| Mérida | Alina García Valdés | 21 |
| Mérida | Andrea Viadest Uribe | 22 |
| Mérida | Angie Arelmi Muñoz Pedro | 18 |
| Mérida | María Fernanda López Cuellar | 22 |
| Mérida | Johanna Oropeza Gonzales | 20 |
| Mérida | Gabriela Gonzales Medina | 22 |
