= Nuestra Belleza Baja California 2011 =

- Date: June 17, 2011
- Presenters: Alejandra Gaxiola, Luis Eduardo Cantúa
- Entertainment: Efecto Iguana
- Venue: Jardines de Canal 12, Tijuana, Baja California
- Broadcaster: Televisa
- Entrants: 5
- Placements: 3
- Winner: Gabriela Acuña; Tecate

Nuestra Belleza Baja California 2011, was held in the Jardines de Canal 12 in Tijuana, Baja California on June 17, 2011. At the conclusion of the final night of competition Gabriela Acuña of Tecate was crowned the winner. Acuña was crowned by outgoing Nuestra Belleza Baja California titleholder Nancy Galaz. Five contestants competed for the title.

== Results ==
=== Placements ===
Final results	Contestant
Nuestra Belleza Baja California 2011	Gabriela Acuña
Suplente / 1st Runner-up	Lizbeth López

=== Special awards ===
Award	Contestant
Miss TV Chat	Gabriela Acuña

== Judges ==
- Álvaro Ávila
- Bibi Uribe - TV Hostess
- Julio Rodríguez - Tijuanarte Director
- Eduardo Góngora - Doctor
- Ana Laura Corral - National Coordinator of Nuestra Belleza México

== Background Music ==
- Efecto Iguana

== Contestants ==
Hometown	Contestant	Age	Height (m)
Tecate	Gabriela Acuña	19	1.73
Tijuana	Fernanda Pérez	22	1.70
Tijuana	Ilse Melina Oronia	18	1.70
Tijuana	Lizbeth López	18	1.76
Tijuana	Ximena Rozana Álvarez	23	1.72
