= Nuestra Belleza Durango 2010 =

- Date: July 1, 2010
- Venue: Centro de Convenciones, Hotel Holiday, Durango, Durango.
- Broadcaster: Televisa
- Entrants: 8
- Placements: 3
- Winner: Vanessa Crispín

Nuestra Belleza Durango 2010, was held at the 1,000-seat Centro de Convenciones, Hotel Holiday, Durango, Durango on July 1, 2010. At the conclusion of the final night of competition, Vanessa Crispín of Gómez Palacio was crowned the winner. Crispín was crowned by outgoing Nuestra Belleza Durango titleholder, Marcela Maynez. Eight contestants competed for the state title.

== Results ==
=== Placements ===
Final results	Contestant
Nuestra Belleza Durango 2010	Vanessa Crispín
Suplente / 1st Runner-up	Patricia Pérez
2nd Runner-up	Adriana Flores

=== Special awards ===
Award	Contestant
Miss Photogenic	Cristina de la Rosa
Miss Congeniality	Adriana Flores
Miss Elegance	Adriana Flores

== Judges ==
- Carlo Antonio Rico - Producer of Nuestra Belleza México
- Paty Brogeras - Regional Coordinator of Nuestra Belleza México
- Ivonne Izcaplewsky - Televisa Representative Artists
- Anabel Solis - Nuestra Belleza Mundo México 2009
- Jimena Navarrete - Nuestra Belleza México 2009

== Background Music ==
- Villas del Oeste

== Contestants ==
Contestant	Age	Height	Hometown
Adriana Flores	20	1.75	Durango
Alondra Ochoa	21	1.73	Durango
Alondra Soto	22	1.68	Durango
Cristina de la Rosa	22	1.74	Gomez Palacio
Isabel Nava	22	1.70	Durango
Karla Salazar	21	1.71	Durango
Patricia Linden Pérez	22	1.72	Durango
Vanessa Crispín Herrera	19	1.73	Gomez Palacio
