= Nuestra Belleza Baja California 2010 =

Pageant held in Baja California

- Date: August 6, 2010
- Presenters: Cristina Covarrubias, Luis Eduardo Cantua
- Venue: Tijuana, Baja California
- Broadcaster: Televisa
- Entrants: 6
- Placements: 3
- Winner: Nancy Galaz

Nuestra Belleza Baja California 2010, was held in Tijuana, Baja California on August 6, 2010. At the conclusion of the final night of competition, Nancy Galaz of Tijuana was crowned the winner. Galaz was crowned by outgoing Nuestra Belleza Baja California titleholder, Ana Sofía García. Six contestants competed for the state title.

The pageant was hosted by Cristina Covarrubias and Luis Eduardo Cantua.

== Results ==
=== Placements ===
Final results	Contestant
Nuestra Belleza Baja California 2010	Nancy Galaz
Suplente / 1st Runner-up	Mayra Magaña
2nd Runner-up	Claudia Ramírez

=== Special awards ===
Award	Contestant
Miss TV Chat	Paola de la Toba

== Contestants ==
Hometown	Contestant	Age	Height (m)
Mexicali	Brenda Lorenia Roa Aguilera	20	1.75
Tijuana	Claudia Carolina Ramírez Pére	22	1.72
Tijuana	Mariel Quiroz Lim	23	1.72
Mexicali	Mayra Elisa Magaña Martínez	21	1.70
Tijuana	Nancy Marisol Galaz Piceno	22	1.74
Ensenada	Paola Isabel de la Toba Fletes	22	1.71
