= Nuestra Belleza Baja California 2012 =

Beauty contest in Mexico

- Date: July 26, 2012
- Presenters: Cristina Covarrubias, Cesar García
- Venue: Sala de Espectáculos del Centro Cultural Tijuana, Tijuana, Baja California
- Broadcaster: Televisa
- Entrants: 11
- Placements: 5
- Winner: Jeraldine González; Tijuana

Nuestra Belleza Baja California 2012, was held at the Sala de Espectáculos del Centro Cultural Tijuana of Tijuana, Baja California on July 26, 2012. At the conclusion of the final night of competition Jeraldine González from Tijuana was crowned the winner. González was crowned by outgoing Nuestra Belleza Baja California titleholder Gabriela Acuña. Eleven contestants competed for the title.

== Results ==
=== Placements ===
Final results	Contestant
Nuestra Belleza Baja California 2012	Jeraldine González
Suplente / 1st Runner-up	Nayeli Guadalupe Benítez
2nd Runner-up	Laura Talía Cardénas
3rd Runner-up	Jocelyn Osuna Fox
4th Runner-up	Nadia Nohemí Parra

== Contestants ==
Hometown	Contestant
Mexicali	Marina Ruiz Tinajero
Mexicali	Noemí Sánchez Hacegaba
Mexicali	Rossella Alexandra Ramírez Meza
Rosarito	Nayeli Guadalupe Benítez Jiménez
Tijuana	Jeraldine González Mez
Tijuana	Vanesa Lozoya Martínez
Tijuana	Jocelyn Abril Osuna Fox
Tijuana	Elidee Silva Durón
Tijuana	Jeanet Mariana Aguilar Alcazar
Tijuana	Laura Talía Cárdenas Armenta
Tijuana	Nadia Nohemí Parra Medina
