= Bailando por un Sueño: Primer Campeonato Internacional de Baile =

- Created by: Televisa
- Presented by: Adal Ramones; Liza Echeverría
- Country of origin: Mexico
- No. of episodes: 7

Production
- Production location: Forum 2
- Running time: 1–3 hours

Original release
- Network: Canal de las Estrellas
- Release: November 4 – December 16, 2007

Bailando por un Sueño: Primer Campeonato Internacional de Baile (Dancing for a Dream: First International Dance Championship) is a TV show, where celebrities and dancers from different countries that had participated before in the show Bailando por un Sueño compete to win the First International Dance Championship Cup or the Nations Cup. It began on November 4, 2007 and finished on December 16, 2007, hosted by Adal Ramones and Liza Echeverría. The show was aired at 20:00 (-6 GTM) on Sunday, by Canal de las Estrellas.

== Format ==
This show was based on the format of Bailando por un Sueño. Nine couples (formed by a celebrity and an amateur dancer) competed each week against each other dancing several styles to impress a panel of judges. The judges gave to each performance a score from 1–10. From the nine scores, there was a secret one, "The Secret Score" from one judge. It was revealed at the end of the show. Also, the highest and the lowest scores were cancelled, to eliminate favoritism. At the end of each program, the lowest-scored couples were revealed. If a couple received the lowest score of the week three times in a row, it will be eliminated of the competition.

== Jury ==
There was a judge for each participating country

Country	Judge
Colombia	Rossana Lignarolo
Mexico	Ema Pulido
Slovakia	Ján Ďurovčík
Panama	Mireya Navarro
Costa Rica	Maripili Araya
Paraguay	Sussy Sacco
Ecuador	Cristina Pérez
Romania	Dana Rogoz
Argentina	Jorge Lafauci

== Couples ==
Country	Celebrity	Professional partner	Choreographer	Status
Colombia	Shirley Gómez	Mario Andrés Barrios ^{4}	Richi Sánchez	Ninth Place on December 16, 2007
Panama	Renée Alejandra Celis ^{1}	Nicanor Villarreal	José Luis Jiménez	Eighth Place on December 16, 2007
Paraguay	Melissa Quiñonez ^{3}	Rafael Martínez	Raúl Benítez	Seventh Place on December 16, 2007
Ecuador	Juan Sebastián "Juancho" López	Shirley Jiménez	Carlos Menéndez	Sixth Place on December 16, 2007
Costa Rica	Shirley Álvarez	Ricardo Granados	Rony Arauz	Fifth Place on December 16, 2007
Slovakia	Patrik Švajda	Majka Lörinčíková	František Plančár	Fourth Place on December 16, 2007
Argentina	Laura Fidalgo	Maximiliano D'Iorio ^{2}	Gustavo Wons	Third Place on December 16, 2007
Romania	Andreea Bălan	Petrișor Ruge	Doina Botiș	Second Place on December 16, 2007
Mexico	Latin Lover	Mariana Vallejo	Alejandro Martínez	First Place on December 16, 2007

^1Liza Hernández, former celebrity from Panama, withdrew from the competition in week two due to an infection in the uterus. She was replaced by Renée Alejandra Celis.

^2Gustavo Rojas, former amateur dancer from Argentina, withdrew from the competition in week two due to food poisoning. He was replaced by Maximiliano D'Iorio.

^3Florencia Gismondi, former celebrity from Paraguay, withdrew from the competition in week three due to an injury to the kneecap. She was replaced by Melissa Quiñonez.

^4Felipe "Pipe" Hurtado, former amateur dancer from Colombia, withdrew from the competition in week three due to laceration of the left buttock. He was replaced by Mario Andrés Hurtado.
