= Mexicana Universal Quintana Roo =

- Formation: 1994 (as Nuestra Belleza Quintana Roo); 2017 (as Mexicana Universal Quintana Roo)
- Type: Beauty Pageant
- Headquarters: Cancún
- Location: Mexico
- Local Coordinator: Daniela Ortiz

Mexicana Universal Quintana Roo (until 2016 called Nuestra Belleza Quintana Roo) is a state-level contest in the state of Quintana Roo, Mexico, which selects the state representative for the national contest Mexicana Universal (formerly called Nuestra Belleza México), thus aspiring to represent the country internationally on one of the platforms offered.

The state organization has achieved the following results since 1994:

- 2nd Runner-up: 1 (1998)
- 3rd Runner-up: 1 (2000)
- Top 15/16: 2 (1994, 1996)
- Top 20/21: 1 (2005)
- Unplaced: 16 (1995, 1997, 1999, 2002, 2003, 2006, 2007, 2009, 2011, 2015, 2017, 2019, 2021, 2022, 2023, 2025)
- Absences: 9 (2001, 2004, 2008, 2010, 2012, 2013, 2014, 2016, 2018)

== National Queens ==
- Lilián Villanueva - Reina de las Flores México 2001 (Designated)
- Lilián Villanueva - Nuestra Belleza Internacional México 2000
- Valeria de Anda - Miss Costa Maya México 2000 (Designated)
- Solange Rivera - Miss Atlántico México 1999 (Designated)

== International Queens ==
- Lilián Villanueva - Reina Internacional de las Flores 2001

== Titleholders ==
The following are the names of the annual winners of Mexicana Universal Quintana Roo, listed in ascending order, as well as their results during the national Mexicana Universal pageant. State queens who represented the country in a current or past franchise of the national organization are also highlighted in a specific color.

Current Franchises:

- Competed at Miss Grand International.
- Competed at Miss International.
- Competed at Miss Charm.
- Competed at Reina Hispanoamericana.
- Competed at Miss Orb International.
- Competed at Nuestra Latinoamericana Universal.

Former Franchises:

- Competed at Miss Universe.
- Competed at Miss World.
- Competed at Miss Continente Americano.
- Competed at Miss Costa Maya International.
- Competed at Miss Atlántico Internacional.
- Competed at Miss Verano Viña del Mar.
- Competed at Reina Internacional del Café.
- Competed at Reina Internacional de las Flores.
- Competed at Señorita Continente Americano.
- Competed at Nuestra Belleza Internacional.

Year	Titleholder	Hometown	Placement	Special Award	Notes
2025	Karina Donají Rodríguez Ceja	Playa del Carmen	-	-	Was born in Sinaloa
2024	In 2024, due to changes in the dates of the national pageant, the election of the state queens was postponed for one year.				
2023	Blanca Marisol Tejero Avilés	Bacalar	-	-	Competed at Mexicana Universal Quintana Roo 2022; Miss Earth Quintana Roo-Air 2015; Miss Earth Bacalar 2015
2022	Georgina Andrea Cabral Durán (Resigned)	Cancún	Did not Compete	-	-
2022	Ángeles Cecilia Sánchez Rivero (Assumed)	Cancún	-	-	1st Runner-up at Mexicana Universal Quintana Roo 2022
2021	Marisol Fernanda Michel Sotelo	Cancun	-	-	-
2020	In 2020, due to the contingency of COVID-19 there was a lag in the year of the state contest				
2019	Montserrat Sánchez Flores	Playa del Carmen	-	-	Señorita México 2018; Señorita Quintana Roo 2018
2018	No candidate was sent				
2017	Paola Gargari Rios (Resigned)	Cancún	Did not Compete	-	
2017	Eyra Daniela Leines Velasco (Assumed)	Cancún	-	-	1st Runner-up at Mexicana Universal Quintana Roo 2017; Scarlett Leines' sister, Miss Quintana Roo 2021
Until 2016 the Title was Nuestra Belleza Quintana Roo
2016	No candidate was sent				
2015	Salma Betsabé Sosa Herrera	Cancún	-	-	-
2014	No candidate was sent				
2013	No candidate was sent				
2012	No candidate was sent				
2011	Valery Antoinette Gantert Beristain	Cancún	-	-	-
2010	No candidate was sent				
2009	Daniela Díaz Rodríguez	Chetumal	-	-	-
2008	No candidate was sent				
2007	Almendra Espino Landeros	Cancún	-	-	-
2006	Mercedes Cortina Martín	Cancún	-	-	-
2005	Erika Argüello Loria	Chetumal	Top 20	-	-
2004	No candidate was sent				
2003	Maritza López Morales	Chetumal	-	-	-
2002	Diana Franco Padilla	Cancún	-	-	-
2001	No candidate was sent				
2000	Lilián Jesús Villanueva Chan	Chetumal	3rd Runner-up	Best Hair	Reina Internacional de las Flores 2001; Reina de las Flores México 2001; Nuestra Belleza Internacional México 2000; Top 20 at Nuestra Belleza Mundo México 2000
1999	Valeria de Anda González	Chetumal	-	-	Competed at Miss Costa Maya International 2000; Miss Costa Maya México 2000
1998	Solange Rivera Astudillo	Chetumal	2nd Runner-up	-	Competed at Miss Atlántico Internacional 1999; Miss Atlántico México 1999
1997	Luz María Cabrera Montoya	Chetumal	-	-	-
1996	Ana Ivette Zelaya Espinoza	Cancun	Top 16	-	-
1995	Natalia Genoveva Sánchez	Chetumal	-	-	-
1994	Penélope Mézquita Torres	Chetumal	Top 16	-	Was born in Mexico City

== See also ==
- Miss Quintana Roo
