= Amina Blancarte =

Mexican model

- Born: Helen Amina Blancarte Tirado; Mazatlán, Sinaloa, Mexico
- Occupations: Model and TV personality
- Beauty pageant titleholder
- Title: Reina del Carnaval de Mazatlán 1993; Nuestra Belleza Sinaloa 1994; Nuestra Belleza Internacional 1995
- Major competitions: Nuestra Belleza Sinaloa 1994; (Winner); Nuestra Belleza México 1994; (Top 6); Nuestra Belleza Internacional 1995; (Winner)

Helen Amina Blancarte Tirado (born in Mazatlán, Sinaloa) is a Mexican television personality, model and beauty pageant titleholder, best known for her reign as Reina del Carnaval de Mazatlán 1993, a prestigious title that positioned her as the maximum sovereign of one of Mexico's most iconic cultural festivals.

== Career ==
At age 19, Blancarte was crowned Reina del Carnaval de Mazatlán on February 13, 1993, during a ceremony at the Estadio Teodoro Mariscal, marking the beginning of a year-long ambassadorship that involved extensive travel and public engagements. In 1994, she won Nuestra Belleza Sinaloa, placing in the top six at the national Nuestra Belleza México competition. The following year, she was crowned Nuestra Belleza Internacional, becoming the first Mexican winner of the title.

Blancarte has remained connected to her roots by serving multiple times as a host and judge for Carnival queen selections. Received a silver jubilee tribute in 2018 for the 25th anniversary of her reign, during which she reflected on the event's role in fostering community unity and cultural identity.
