= Susana Diazayas =

Mexican actress (born 1979)

- Born: Susana Arlett Diazayas Jimeno; February 26, 1979 (age 46); Mexico, ciudad de México
- Other names: Susana Diazayas
- Occupations: Actress; model
- Years active: 1998-present

Susana Diazayas (born Susana Arlett Diazayas Jimeno on February 26, 1979 in Toluca, State of Mexico, Mexico) is a Mexican actress. She was participant the pageant of Nuestra Belleza México 2000.

== Filmography ==
Telenovelas, Theater
Year	Title	Role	Notes
2004	Rubí	Carmen	Special Appearance
2004-05	Misión S.O.S	Daniela	Special Appearance
2005-06	Barrera de amor	Valeria Valladolid Galván	Young Protagonist
2006-07	Las Dos Caras de Ana	Sofía Ortega	Supporting Role
2008	El Juramento	Rosita	Supporting Role
2009-10	Hasta Que el Dinero Nos Separe	Cristina " Cristy"	Supporting Role
2010	No hay burlas con el amor		Theatrical Performance
2010–11	Cuando Me Enamoro	Inés Fonseca de del Valle (Young)	Special Appearance
2010–11	Triunfo del Amor	Natividad "Nati" Duval de Martinez	Supporting Role
2012–13	Qué Bonito Amor	Wendy Martínez de la Garza de Johnson	Supporting Role
2015	Lo Imperdonable	Maestra Gaby	Supporting Role

=== TV series ===
- Como dice el dicho
- La rosa de Guadalupe
- Todos Son Ángeles
- Después, El Cielo
- Decisiones
- Por Amor a mi Hija
- Los simuladores
- Vecinos
