= Miss Quintana Roo =

Beauty pageant in Quintana Roo, Mexico

- Formation: 2016
- Type: Beauty pageant
- Headquarters: Ciudad Juárez
- Location: Mexico
- Local Coordinator: Ulises Contreras

Miss Quintana Roo is a state-level contest in the state of Quintana Roo, Mexico, which selects the state representative for the national contest Miss México, thus aspiring to represent the country internationally on one of the platforms offered.

The state organization has achieved the following results since 2016:

- 1st Runner-up: 3 (2017, 2019, 2023)
- Top 10/11: 3 (2016, 2018, 2021)
- Unplaced: 1 (2025)

== National Queens ==
- Sofía Zamora - Miss México Supranational 2026 (Designated)
- Sofía Zamora - Miss México Global City 2025 (Designated)

== Titleholders ==
The following are the names of the annual winners of Miss Quintana Roo, listed in ascending order, as well as their results during the national Miss México pageant. State queens who represented the country in a current or past franchise of the national organization are also highlighted in a specific color.

Current Franchises:

- Competed at Miss World.
- Competed at Miss Supranational.
- Competed at Miss Cosmo.
- Competed at Miss Elite.
- Competed at Top Model of the World.
- Competed at Reina Internacional del Café.
- Competed at Reina Mundial del Banano.
- Competed at Miss Continentes Unidos.
- Competed at Miss Global City.

Former Franchises:

- Competed at Miss Grand International.
- Competed at Miss Costa Maya International.

Year	Titleholder	Hometown	Placement	Special Award	Notes
2026	Andrea Varela				
2025	Naomy Ek Chi	Cancún	-	Dances of Mexico	-
2024	In 2024, due to changes in the dates of the national pageant, the election of the state queens was postponed for one year.				
2023	Sofía Zamora Macías	Colima	1st Runner-up	Head to Head	Will compete at Miss Supranational 2026; Miss México Supranational 2026; 1st Runner-up at Miss México Supranational 2025; Competed at Miss Global City 2025; Miss México Global City 2025; 1st Runner-up at Miss México 2023; Miss Colima 2021; Born and raised in Colima
2022	In 2022, due to changes in the dates of the national pageant, the election of the state queens was postponed for one year.				
2021	Flor Scarlett Leines Velasco	Cancún	Top 10	-	Teen Continental México 2018; Teen Continental Quintana Roo 2018; Eyra Leines' sister, Mexicana Universal Quintana Roo 2017
2020	In 2020, due to the contingency of COVID-19 there was a lag in the year of the state contest				
2019	Regina González Salman	Guadalajara	1st Runner-up	Best National Costume	Competed at Miss Supranational 2022; Miss México Supranational 2022; Was born and raised in Jalisco
2018	Fernanda Isabel Santoscoy Jiménez	Playa del Carmen	Top 10	-	-
2017	Whitney Minerva Luna Correa	Tlaquepaque	1st Runner-up	-	1st Runner-up at Miss Jalisco 2017; 1st Runner-up at Global Charity Queen 2017; Global Charity México 2017; Competed at Nuestra Belleza Jalisco 2015; Was born and raised in Jalisco
2016	Sara Renée Carranza Monroy (Resigned)	Cancún	Did not Compete	-	-
2016	Fabiola Cristina Peniche Canto (Assumed)	Mérida	Top 10	-	Top 6 at Miss México Grand 2020; 1st Runner-up at Nuestra Belleza Yucatán 2016; Was born and raised in Yucatán

== See also ==
- Mexicana Universal Quintana Roo
