= Miss Baja California =

State-level contest in Baja California, Mexico

- Formation: 2016
- Type: Beauty Pageant
- Headquarters: Ensenada
- Location: Mexico
- Local Coordinator: Karlo Carrillo

Miss Baja California is a state-level contest in the state of Baja California, Mexico, which selects the state representative for the national contest Miss México, thus aspiring to represent the country internationally on one of the platforms offered.

The state organization has achieved the following results since 2016:

- Winner: 1 (2018)
- Top 10/11: 1 (2017)
- Top 16: 1 (2019)
- Unplaced: 4 (2016, 2021, 2023, 2025)

== National Queens ==
- Kenia Ponce - Miss México Continentes Unidos 2019

== Titleholders ==
The following are the names of the annual winners of Miss Baja California, listed in ascending order, as well as their results during the national Miss México pageant. State queens who represented the country in a current or past franchise of the national organization are also highlighted in a specific color.

Current Franchises:

- Competed at Miss World.
- Competed at Miss Supranational.
- Competed at Miss Cosmo.
- Competed at Miss Elite.
- Competed at Top Model of the World.
- Competed at Reina Internacional del Café.
- Competed at Reina Mundial del Banano.
- Competed at Miss Continentes Unidos.
- Competed at Miss Global City.

Former Franchises:

- Competed at Miss Grand International.
- Competed at Miss Costa Maya International.

Year	Titleholder	Hometown	Placement	Special Award	Notes
2026	Ana Sofía Villa Mendez	Ensenada	TBD		
2025	Melissa Huerta Murillo	Ensenada	-	-	Virreina Internacional de las Fiestas de Independencia 2024; Miss Earth Baja California 2020; Competed at Mexicana Universal Baja California 2018; Señorita Ensenada Cenicienta 2017; Miss Playa Mundial México 2016; Competed at Reina de Reina México 2016; Reina de Reina Latina Baja California 2016
2024	Due to changes in the dates of the national pageant, the election of the state queens was postponed for this year.				
2023	Jeanette Valdez Trujillo	Mexicali	-	-	-
2022	Due to changes in the dates of the national pageant, the election of the state queens was postponed for this year.				
2021	Valeria Alejandra Valdés Guajardo	Monterrey	-	-	Top 10 at Miss México Supranational 2023; Top 6 at Miss México Elite 2022; 1st Runner-up at Miss Nuevo León 2021; Top 5 at Miss Nuevo León 2019; Was born and raised in Nuevo León
2020	Due to the contingency of COVID-19 there was a lag in the year of the state contest				
2019	Daniela Flores Pedroza	Ensenada	Top 16	-	Embajadora de la Gastronomía 2021
2018	Kenia Melissa Ponce Beltrán	Mexicali	Miss México; Continentes Unidos	-	2nd Runner-up at Miss Continentes Unidos 2019; Competed at Nuestra Belleza México 2017; 1st Runner-up at Nuestra Belleza Baja California 2016; 1st Runner-up at Nuestra Belleza Baja California 2015; Señorita Fiestas del Sol 2011
2017	Karen Alejandra Aguilar García	Mexicali	Top 10	Head to Head	Miss Multinational México 2017; Miss Latina México 2016; Miss Latina Baja California 2016
2016	Cecilia Analy Solís Medina	Mexicali	-	-	-

== See also ==
- Mexicana Universal Baja California
