= Miss San Luis Potosí =

Beauty pageant in San Luis Potosí, Mexico

- Formation: 2016
- Type: Beauty pageant
- Headquarters: San Luis Potosí
- Location: Mexico
- Local Coordinator: Norma González

Miss San Luis Potosí is a state-level contest in the state of San Luis Potosí, Mexico, which selects the state representative for the national contest Miss México, thus aspiring to represent the country internationally on one of the platforms offered.

The state organization has achieved the following results since 2016:

- Winner: 1 (2021)
- Top 10/11: 1 (2018)
- Top 16: 2 (2016, 2025)
- Unplaced: 3 (2017, 2019, 2023)

== National Queens ==
- Alejandra Díaz de León - Miss México 2021

== Titleholders ==
The following are the names of the annual winners of Miss San Luis Potosí, listed in ascending order, as well as their results during the national Miss México pageant. State queens who represented the country in a current or past franchise of the national organization are also highlighted in a specific color.

Current Franchises:

- Competed at Miss World.
- Competed at Miss Supranational.
- Competed at Miss Cosmo.
- Competed at Miss Elite.
- Competed at Top Model of the World.
- Competed at Reina Internacional del Café.
- Competed at Reina Mundial del Banano.
- Competed at Miss Continentes Unidos.
- Competed at Miss Global City.

Former Franchises:

- Competed at Miss Grand International.
- Competed at Miss Costa Maya International.

Year	Titleholder	Hometown	Placement	Special Award	Notes
2026	Ximena Cabrera	Huehuetlán	TBD		Reina de la Feria Nacional de la Huasteca Potosina 2023; Miss Teen Global Beauty International 2021; Miss Teen Global Beauty México 2021; Miss Teen Mundo México 2018; Miss Teen San Luis Potosí 2018
2025	Jaqueline Barrera Benítez	Rioverde	Top 16	Miss Photogenic	Embajadora de la Feria Nacional Potosina 2024; Reina de los Azahares 2023
2024	In 2024, due to changes in the dates of the national pageant, the election of the state queens was postponed for one year.				
2023	Mariana García (Resigned)	San Luis Potosí	Did not Compete	-	-
2023	Ximena Elizabeth López Mora (Resigned)	San Luis Potosí	Did not Compete	-	Top 16 at Miss México Top Model of the World 2024
2023	Alejandra Estrada (Assumed)	San Luis Potosí	-	-	-
2022	In 2022, due to changes in the dates of the national pageant, the election of the state queens was postponed for one year.				
2021	Alejandra Díaz de León Soler	San Luis Potosí	Miss México	Miss Top Model	4th Runner-up at Miss Universe México 2024; Miss Universe San Luis Potosí 2024; Competed at Miss World 2023; The Miss Globe 2019; The Miss Globe México 2019; Miss Earth México-Water 2019; Miss Earth San Luis Potosí 2019
2020	In 2020, due to the contingency of COVID-19 there was a lag in the year of the state contest				
2019	Alexa Muñiz Sánchez (Resigned)	San Luis Potosí	Did not Compete	-	-
2019	Daniela Sánchez Acosta (Assumed)	Rioverde	-	-	Competed at Mexicana Universal San Luis Potosí 2017
2018	Jessica Yatzumi Mendieta Méndez	Rioverde	Top 10	-	Top 6 at Miss México Elite 2022; Reina de la Feria Nacional Potosina 2017; Competed at Miss Earth México 2016; Miss Earth San Luis Potosí 2016; Reina FERERIO 2016; Competed at Nuestra Belleza San Luis Potosí 2015; Miss Earth San Luis Potosí-Air 2014; Teen Universe San Luis Potosí 2014
2017	María Fernanda Barbosa Gutiérrez	San Luis Potosí	-	-	1st Runner-up at Nuestra Belleza San Luis Potosí 2016
2016	Verónica Sánchez Alonso (Resigned)	San Luis Potosí	Did not Compete	-	Competed at Miss F1 México 2015; 5th Runner-up at Mexico's Next Top Model 2009; Top 10 at Nuestra Belleza México 2012; Nuestra Belleza San Luis Potosí 2012
2016	Alejandra Delgadillo Salazar (Assumed)	Monterrey	Top 16	Miss Beach Beauty	1st Runner-up at Miss Nuevo León 2016; 2nd Runner- up at Nuestra Belleza Nuevo León 2012; Competed at Señorita UANL 2011; 1st Runner-up at Señorita UANL 2008

== See also ==
- Mexicana Universal San Luis Potosí
