= Miss Zacatecas =

Beauty pageant in Zacatecas, Mexico

- Formation: 2016
- Type: Beauty pageant
- Headquarters: Zacatecas
- Location: Mexico
- Local Coordinator: Gabriel Zamora

Miss Zacatecas is a state-level contest in the state of Zacatecas, Mexico, which selects the state representative for the national contest Miss México, thus aspiring to represent the country internationally on one of the platforms offered.

The state organization has achieved the following results since 2016:

- Top 10/11: 1 (2016, 2025)
- Unplaced: 3 (2017, 2018, 2019, 2021, 2023)

== National Queens ==
- Roxana Reyes - Miss México Continentes Unidos 2022 (Designated)

== Titleholders ==
The following are the names of the annual winners of Miss Zacatecas, listed in ascending order, as well as their results during the national Miss México pageant. State queens who represented the country in a current or past franchise of the national organization are also highlighted in a specific color.

Current Franchises:

- Competed at Miss World.
- Competed at Miss Supranational.
- Competed at Miss Cosmo.
- Competed at Miss Elite.
- Competed at Top Model of the World.
- Competed at Reina Internacional del Café.
- Competed at Reina Mundial del Banano.
- Competed at Miss Continentes Unidos.
- Competed at Miss Global City.

Former Franchises:

- Competed at Miss Grand International.
- Competed at Miss Costa Maya International.

| Year | Titleholder | Hometown | Placement | Special Award | Notes |
|---|---|---|---|---|---|
| 2026 | Isabel Rodríguez | Zacatecas | TBD | | |
| 2025 | Mariana Magdalena López Guerrero | Naucalpan | Top 11 | Miss Talent; Head to Head | 2nd Runner-up at Mexicana Universal 2023; Mexicana Universal Estado de México 2022 |
| 2024 | In 2024, due to changes in the dates of the national pageant, the election of the state queens was postponed for one year. | | | | |
| 2023 | Fabiola Estefanía Gutiérrez Ojeda | San Juan del Río | - | Miss Top Model | 1st Runner-up at Miss Querétaro 2023; Was born and raised in Querétaro |
| 2022 | In 2022, due to changes in the dates of the national pageant, the election of the state queens was postponed for one year. | | | | |
| 2021 | Mariana Lugo Piña (Resigned) | Pinos | Did not Compete | - | - |
| 2021 | Amanda Ocampo Miranda (Assumed) | Querétaro | - | Miss Congeniality | Competed at Miss Globe México 2022; Miss Globe Querétaro 2022; 1st Runner-up at Miss Querétaro 2021; Was born and raised in Querétaro |
| 2020 | In 2020, due to the contingency of COVID-19 there was a lag in the year of the state contest | | | | |
| 2019 | Nadia Karina Román | Jerez | - | - | - |
| 2018 | Perla Damayanti Santana Esparza | Villanueva | - | - | Princess at Reina de la Feria de Villanueva 2018 |
| 2017 | Diana Bárbara Gallegos Torres | Zacatecas | - | - | - |
| 2016 | Roxana Reyes Herrera | Cuauhtémoc | Top 10 | Miss Top Model | 2nd Runner-up at Miss Continentes Unidos 2017; Miss México Continentes Unidos 2017; Top 8 at Miss México Grand 2017; 3rd Runner-up at Mexico's Next Top Model 2014; 1st Runner-up at Nuestra Belleza Zacatecas 2012; Top 16 at Miss Earth México 2011; Miss Earth Zacatecas 2011 |

== See also ==
- Mexicana Universal Zacatecas
