= Nuestra Belleza Baja California 2009 =

Beauty pageant

- Date: July 29, 2009
- Presenters: César García, Nadia Ramos
- Venue: Jardines de Canal 12, Tijuana, Baja California
- Broadcaster: Televisa
- Entrants: 4
- Placements: 2
- Winner: Ana Sofía García; Mexicali

Nuestra Belleza Baja California 2009, was a beauty pageant held in the Jardines de Canal 12 in Tijuana, Baja California on July 29, 2009. At the conclusion of the final night of competition Ana Sofía García of Mexicali was crowned the winner. García was crowned by outgoing Nuestra Belleza Baja California titleholder Paulina Hernández. Four contestants competed for the title.

== Results ==
=== Placements ===
Final results	Contestant
Nuestra Belleza Baja California 2009	Ana Sofía García
Suplente / 1st Runner-up	Magdalena Franco

=== Special awards ===
Award	Contestant
Miss TV Chat	Ana Sofía García

== Contestants ==
Hometown	Contestant	Age	Height (m)
Mexicali	Ana Sofía García Gallegos	21	1.78
Tijuana	Diana Irma Jurado Escandón	21	1.77
Ensenada	María Madgalena Franco Mayoral	23	1.73
Tijuana	Marilyn Cristal Chacón Beltrán	22	1.70
