= Mexicana Universal Zacatecas =

- Formation: 1994 (as Nuestra Belleza Zacatecas); 2017 (as Mexicana Universal Zacatecas)
- Type: Beauty Pageant
- Headquarters: Zacatecas
- Location: Mexico
- Local Coordinator: Itzel Uribe

Mexicana Universal Zacatecas (until 2016 called Nuestra Belleza Zacatecas) is a state-level contest in the state of Zacatecas, Mexico, which selects the state representative for the national contest Mexicana Universal (formerly called Nuestra Belleza México), thus aspiring to represent the country internationally on one of the platforms offered.

The state organization has achieved the following results since 1994:

- 1st Runner-up: 1 (2009)
- 4th Runner-up: 1 (2000)
- 5th Runner-up: 1 (2017)
- Top 10/11/12: 2 (2003, 2005)
- Top 15/16: (1996)
- Unplaced: 22 (1994, 1995, 1997, 1998, 1999, 2001, 2002, 2003, 2004, 2006, 2007, 2008, 2010, 2011, 2012, 2014, 2015, 2018, 2021, 2022, 2023, 2025)
- Absences: 3 (2013, 2016, 2019)

== National Queens ==
- Diana Jiménez - Miss Continente Americano México 2006
- Eva Ruiz - Reina del Café México 2001

== Titleholders ==
The following are the names of the annual winners of Mexicana Universal Zacatecas, listed in ascending order, as well as their results during the national Mexicana Universal pageant. State queens who represented the country in a current or past franchise of the national organization are also highlighted in a specific color.

Current Franchises:

- Competed at Miss Grand International.
- Competed at Miss International.
- Competed at Reina Hispanoamericana.
- Competed at Miss Orb International.
- Competed at Nuestra Latinoamericana Universal.

Former Franchises:

- Competed at Miss Universe.
- Competed at Miss World.
- Competed at Miss Charm.
- Competed at Miss Continente Americano.
- Competed at Miss Costa Maya International.
- Competed at Miss Atlántico Internacional.
- Competed at Miss Verano Viña del Mar.
- Competed at Reina Internacional del Café.
- Competed at Reina Internacional de las Flores.
- Competed at Señorita Continente Americano.
- Competed at Nuestra Belleza Internacional.

Year	Titleholder	Hometown	Placement	Special Award	Notes
2026	Carolina Tovar	Teúl de González Ortega	TBD		Competed at Miss Juventud México 2022; Miss Juventud Zacatecas 2022
2025	Araceli Aguilar Pérez	Nochistlán	-	-	-
2024	In 2024, due to changes in the dates of the national pageant, the election of the state queens was postponed for one year.				
2023	Margarita Rodarte Rodríguez	Calera	-	-	Princesa at Feria Nacional de Zacatecas 2015
2022	Julia Álvarez Almaraz (Resigned)	Jalpa	Did not Compete	-	Mexicana Universal Jalpa 2022; First married woman and mother from Zacatecas
2022	Lucero de Lira Salazar (Assumed)	Villa García	-	-	1st Runner-up at Mexicana Universal Zacatecas 2022; Mexicana Universal Villa García 2022
2021	María Guadalupe Ramírez Delgado	Fresnillo	-	-	Competed at Miss Universe Mexico 2025; Miss Universe Zacatecas 2025
2020	In 2020, due to the contingency of COVID-19 there was a lag in the year of the state contest				
2019	Alejandra Caldera Salinas (Resigned)	Tlaltenango	Did not Compete	-	2nd Runner-up at Nuestra Belleza Zacatecas 2015
2019	Grecia Victoria Ramírez Soto (Assumed, withdrew two days before the final competition)	Fresnillo	Did not Compete	-	Top 10 at Miss Eco International 2022; Miss Eco México 2022; Competed at Miss Tourism Worldwide 2019; Miss Gran Turismo México 2018; Miss Model Zacatecas 2018; Competed at Miss Piel Dorada Internacional 2017; Miss Piel Dorada México 2016; Miss Piel Dorada Zacatecas 2016; Competed at Nuestra Belleza Zacatecas 2014
2018	Itza Xunely Serna Salazar	Jalpa	-	-	Miss Earth Zacatecas-Air 2016; Miss Earth Jalpa 2016
2017	Karely Sandoval Aranda	Río Grande	5th Runner-up	-	Princesa at Feria Nacional de Zacatecas 2017; Reina de Río Grande 2016; Alejandra Sandoval's sister, Nuestra Belleza Zacatecas 2013
Until 2016 the Title was Nuestra Belleza Zacatecas
2016	No candidate was sent				
2015	Eliana Villegas Arellano	Florencia	-	-	-
2014	Marleth Geraldine Pinedo Domínguez	Fresnillo	-	-	-
2013	Alejandra Sandoval Aranda	Río Grande	Did not Compete	-	Karely Sandoval's sister, Mexicana Universal Zacatecas 2017
2012	Thalía Artemisa Rivera Montañez	Zacatecas	-	-	Competed at Miss Costa Maya International 2013; Miss Costa Maya México 2013; Competed at Reina de la Feria de San Marcos 2012
2011	Michelle Román Hurtado	Jerez	-	-	-
2010	Stephanie Ávila Enciso	Jerez	-	-	-
2009	Verónica Llamas Sánchez (Dethroned after her national participation)	Nochistlán	1st Runner-up	The Contestants' Choice	3rd Runner-up at Mrs Globe 2022; Mrs Globe México 2022
2009	Sofía Yáñez Cuéllar (Successor after Veronicas' national participation)	Jerez	Did not Compete	-	3rd Runner-up at Nuestra Belleza Zacatecas 2009
2008	Sandra Esmeralda González de Santiago	Jerez	-	-	Princesa at Feria Jerez 2008
2007	Edna Paulina Vargas Whitehead	Fresnillo	-	-	-
2006	Dayanira Michelle Varela Muñetón	Jerez	-	-	10th Runner-up at Nuestra Belleza Latina 2008; Princesa at Feria Jerez 2002
2005	Diana Lucía Karimen Jiménez Pérez	Nochistlán	Top 10	-	Competed at Miss Continente Americano 2006; Competed at Nuestra Belleza Jalisco 2004; Señorita Turismo Región de Los Altos 2002; Señorita Jalostotitlán 2002; Was born in Jalisco
2004	Diana Cristina Escamilla González	Fresnillo	-	-	-
2003	Mariana Delgado Osuna	Monte Escobedo	-	-	-
2002	Thelma Patricia Martínez Guajardo	Miguel Auza	-	-	-
2001	Noemí Dolores de la Torre Belmontes	Zacatecas	-	-	-
2000	Eva Ruíz Torres	Calera	4th Runner-up	-	1st Runner-up at Reinado Internacional del Café 2001; Reina del Café México 2001; Top 20 at Nuestra Belleza Mundo México 2000
1999	Sayra Guadalupe Llamas Mojarro	Jalpa	-	-	-
1998	Claudia Susana Landeros Botello	Jerez	-	-	Princesa at Feria Jerez 1998
1997	Gabriela Serrano Briones	Zacatecas	-	-	-
1996	Sonia García Ramírez	Juan Aldama	Top 16	-	-
1995	Yanira Adriana Reveles Pérez	Calera	-	-	-
1994	Minerva Varela Valle	Fresnillo	-	-	-

== Designated Contestants ==
Starting in 2000, states were allowed to have more than one candidate, as some states were not sending candidates for various reasons. The following contestants from Zacatecas were invited to compete in the national pageant alongside the reigning queen, and in some cases, they achieved even better results.

Year	Titleholder	Hometown	Placement	Special Award	Notes
2003	Cecilia Magallanes López	Guadalupe	Top 10	Miss Photogenic	Reina de la Feria Nacional de Zacateas 2002
2000	Daniella Rubio Maldonado	Fresnillo	-	-	-

== See also ==
- Miss Zacatecas
