= Nuestra Belleza México 1994 =

1st Nuestra Belleza México pageant

- Date: November 13, 1994
- Hosts: Raúl Velasco; Liza Echeverría
- Entertainment: Ricky Martin; Manuel Mijares
- Venue: Auditorio Benito Juárez, Zapopan, Jalisco
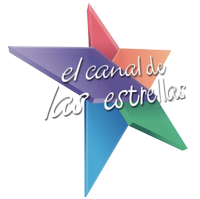
- Broadcaster
- Entrants: 32
- Placements: 16
- Debuts: Aguascalientes; Baja California; Baja California Sur; Campeche; Chiapas; Chihuahua; Coahuila; Colima; Distrito Federal; Durango; Estado de México; Guanajuato; Guerrero; Hidalgo; Jalisco; Michoacán; Morelos; Nayarit; Nuevo León; Oaxaca; Puebla; Querétaro; Quintana Roo; San Luis Potosí; Sinaloa; Sonora; Tabasco; Tamaulipas; Tlaxcala; Veracruz; Yucatán; Zacatecas
- Winner: Luz María Zetina; Estado de México

Nuestra Belleza México 1994 was the 1st edition of the Nuestra Belleza México pageant, held at the Auditorio Benito Juárez in Zapopan, Jalisco, on sunday November 13th, 1994. Thirty-two contestants of the Mexican Republic competed for the national title, which was won by Luz María Zetina of Estado de México, who later competed at Miss Universe 1995 in Namibia. Zetina was crowned by Miss Universe 1994 Sushmita Sen of India and Lupita Jones, first Mexican Miss Universe and National Director of Nuestra Belleza México.

== Background ==
The Miss Universe Organization granted Lupita Jones the license to send the Mexican representative to this important event. In cooperation with Televisa, they created Promocertamen S.A. de C.V. to organize the Nuestra Belleza México pageant with the purpose of changing the perception of beauty pageants in Mexico. They created a structure to hold a state pageant in each state of the country with an operations manual and policies for this new event, structuring a training program for the National Queens, giving them security and tools to compete internationally.

== Results ==
Placement	Contestant
Nuestra Belleza México 1994 (Miss Universe Mexico 1995)	(State of Mexico) Estado de México - Luz María Zetina
1st Runner-up	Aguascalientes - Yadhira Carrillo
Top 6	Colima - Gloria Michel; (Mexico City) Distrito Federal - Tania Turner; Jalisco - Luz Elena González; Sinaloa - Amina Blancarte
Top 16	(Hidalgo (state)) Hidalgo - Viridiana Cortés; Morelos - Diana Velázquez; Nuevo León - Yadira Elizondo; Puebla - Sayi Risso; Querétaro - Andrea Guevara; Quintana Roo - Penélope Mezquita; Sonora - Abigaíl Kuñasich; Tabasco - Cecilia Martínez; Tlaxcala - Verónica Jaspeado; Yucatán - Angélica Schober

=== Appointed titleholders ===
Title	Delegate	International Placement	Country
Nuestra Belleza Internacional México 1995	Sinaloa - Amina Blancarte	Winner - Nuestra Belleza Internacional 1995	United States
Miss Verano México 1995	Tlaxcala - Verónica Jaspeado	Unplaced - Miss Verano Viña del Mar 1995	Chile
The Top Model México 1996	Nuevo León - Yadira Elizondo	Unplaced - The Top Model of the World 1996	Martinique

== Pageant ==
=== Preliminary competition ===
The preliminary competition was held at the Auditorio Benito Juárez in Zapopan, Jalisco, on November 12, the day before the final competition. Prior to the event's conclusion, all candidates competed in swimsuits and evening gowns as part of the selection process to determine the 16 semifinalists who would advance directly to the final competition. The event was hosted by Raúl Velasco.

On this evening, three special awards were presented to the contestants: Best Hair, Miss Diet Coke, and Best Legs. The musical entertainment was provided by the groups Café Tacvba, Magneto, and Ángeles Ochoa. The event was hosted by Liza Echeverría and Marco Antonio Regil.

==== Preliminary jury ====
These are the members of the preliminary jury, who selected the Top 16 during the preliminary competition, after viewing the candidates privately during interviews and the swimsuit and evening gown segments:

- Fernando Romo - "Stylist"
- Sara Castany - "Editor"
- Enrique Rocha - "Television Actor"
- Valéria Melo Péris - "Miss Brazil 1994 and Nuestra Belleza Internacional 1994"
- Ernesto Alonso - "Television Producer"
- Liliana Abud - "Writer and Television Actress"
- Sergio Bustamante - "Artist"
- Salma Hayek - "Film and Television Actress"

=== Final ===
The final gala was broadcast live on Las Estrellas in Mexico from the Auditorio Benito Juárez in Zapopan, Jalisco, on Sunday, November 13, 1994. The event was hosted by Raúl Velasco and Liza Echeverría as part of the Sunday program Siempre en Domingo.

The group of 16 semifinalists was announced during the final competition.

- The 16 semifinalists paraded in a new round in swimsuits and evening gowns; subsequently, 10 of them were eliminated.
- The 6 finalists answered a final question and then walked the runway one last time. The panel of judges considered the overall impression made by each finalist to vote and determine the final rankings.

==== Final jury ====
The jury members who evaluated the contestants:

- Fernando Romo - "Stylist"
- Sara Castany - "Editor"
- Enrique Rocha - "Television Actor"
- Valéria Melo Péris - "Miss Brazil 1994 and Nuestra Belleza Internacional 1994"
- Ernesto Alonso - "Television Producer"
- Liliana Abud - "Writer and Television Actress"
- Sergio Bustamante - "Artist"
- Salma Hayek - "Film and Television Actress"

==== Entertainment ====
- Intermission: Ricky Martin performing "Entre el Amor y los Halagos" and "El Amor de mi Vida"
- Intermission: Manuel Mijares performing "Vives en Mí"

=== Special awards ===
Award	Contestant
Best Hair	Sinaloa - Amina Blancarte
Miss Diet Coke	Tlaxcala - Verónica Jaspeado
Best Legs	Nuevo León - Yadira Elizondo

== Contestants ==
State	Contestant	Age (Note: Ages at the time of the pageant)	Height	Hometown
Aguascalientes	Yadhira Carrillo Villalobos	22	1.66	Aguascalientes
Baja California	María Luisa Pérez Mitre	21	1.73	Tijuana
Baja California Sur	María de los Ángeles Elizalde Grajeda	18	1.65	La Paz
Campeche	Claudia Esperanza Santini Sosa	21	1.70	Campeche
Chiapas	Michelle Ordoñez Flores	18	1.72	Tuxtla Gutiérrez
(Chihuahua (state)) Chihuahua	Luz María Delgado López	23	1.70	Chihuahua
Coahuila	Gabriela Pacheco Pascual	19	1.69	Torreón
Colima	Gloria Michel Ramírez	21	1.69	Colima
(Mexico City) Distrito Federal	Tania Elizabeth Turner Sen	20	1.75	Mexico City
Durango	María Guadalupe Favela Ante	21	1.70	Cuencamé
(State of Mexico) Estado de México	Luz María Zetina Lugo	21	1.69	Toluca
Guanajuato	Blanca Estela Padilla López	21	1.68	Guanajuato
Guerrero	Liliana Abaroa Caso	19	1.77	Acapulco
(Hidalgo (state)) Hidalgo	Viridiana Cortés Domínguez	21	1.70	Pachuca
Jalisco	Luz Elena González de la Torre	20	1.77	Guadalajara
Michoacán	María Nohemí Acuña Avilés	21	1.75	Morelia
Morelos	Yolanda Diana Velázquez Monroy	18	1.66	Jojutla
Nayarit	Marcela Guadalupe Aragón González	23	1.70	Tepic
Nuevo León	Yadira Janneth Elizondo Montemayor	20	1.75	Monterrey
Oaxaca	Perla Xóchitl Chávez Ruíz	21	1.69	Salina Cruz
Puebla	Sayi Risso Bretón	22	1.66	Puebla
Querétaro	Andrea Guevara Roslyn Rowland	21	1.78	Querétaro
Quintana Roo	Penélope Mezquita González	19	1.69	Chetumal
San Luis Potosí	Eleane Eguía Valdéz	20	1.69	San Luis Potosí
Sinaloa	Helen Amina Blancarte Tirado	20	1.76	Mazatlán
Sonora	Abigaíl Kuñasich Gamero	21	1.70	Hermosillo
Tabasco	Alma Cecilia Martínez Pérez	18	1.70	Villahermosa
Tamaulipas	Denisse Carrera Delgado	21	1.70	Ciudad Victoria
Tlaxcala	Verónica Alejandra Jaspeado Martínez	21	1.76	Tlaxcala
Veracruz	Paula Kersti Hartley Alcocer	19	1.76	Xalapa
Yucatán	Angélica Juanita Schober Laferl	23	1.73	Mérida
Zacatecas	Minerva Varela Valle	19	1.68	Fresnillo

=== Pageant notes ===
- Baja California - María Luisa Pérez previously was Señorita Baja California 1992 and she competed at La Modelo el Año 1992.
- Estado de México - Luz María Zetina competed at Miss Universe 1995 in Windhoek, Namibia on 12 May 1995 but was unplaced. She later studied acting at Televisa's Centro de Educación Artística and she worked in telenovelas for a time and currently she stands out as a TV Hostess.
- Nuevo León - Yadira Elizondo was appointed by Lupita Jones as the mexican delegate in The Top Model of the World 1996 on the island of Martinique.
- Sinaloa - Amina Blancarte previously was crowned as Reina del Carnaval Internacional de Mazatlán 1993 in Mazatlán, Sinaloa. One year after she was appointed by Lupita Jones as the Mexican delegate in Nuestra Belleza Internacional 1995 in Miami, Florida, where she was the winner and the first Mexican to win this title. After this she entered at Televisa's Centro de Educación Artística to prepare for a career in TV Hostess. Blancarte was TV Hostess in many programs in Mexico and the United States.
- Tlaxcala - Verónica Jaspeado one year after she was appointed by Lupita Jones as the mexican delegate in Miss Verano Viña del Mar 1995 in Viña del Mar, Chile but was unplaced. Later she worked as an actress at Televisa, where she has appeared in several telenovelas throughout her career. She was also a member of the musical group DKDA in 1999.
