= Blanca Zumárraga =

Mexican model (born 1981)

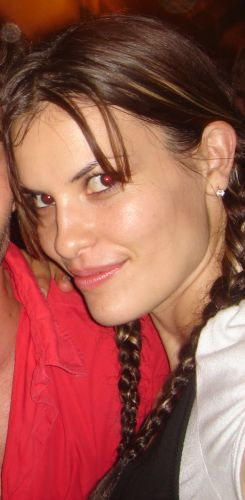
- Born: Blanca Rosalía Zumárraga Contreras; Córdoba, Veracruz, Mexico
- Height: 1.82 m (6 ft 0 in)
- Beauty pageant titleholder
- Title: Nuestra Belleza Puebla 2002; Nuestra Belleza Mundo México 2002
- Hair color: Brown
- Eye color: Brown

Blanca Rosalía Zumárraga Contreras (born January 6, 1981 in Córdoba, Veracruz, Mexico) is a Mexican model and beauty pageant titleholder who competed in Nuestra Belleza México 2002 representing Puebla, the state in which she was raised. She received the title of Miss Mexico World and represented her country in the 2002 Miss World pageant, held on December 7, 2002.

Preceded by Tatiana Rodríguez	Nuestra Belleza Mundo México; 2002	Succeeded by Erika Honstein
