= Rosalva Luna =

Mexican beauty queen

- Born: Rosalva Yazmín Luna Ruiz; Los Mochis, Sinaloa, Mexico age-40
- Height: 1.76 m (5 ft 9 in)
- Beauty pageant titleholder
- Title: Nuestra Belleza México 2003
- Hair color: Black
- Eye color: Brown
- Major competitions: Nuestra Belleza Sinaloa 2003 (Winner); Nuestra Belleza México 2003 (Winner); Miss Universe 2004 (Top 15)

Rosalva Yazmín Luna Ruiz (born 1981) is a Mexican model and beauty pageant titleholder who was crowned Nuestra Belleza México 2003 and represented her country at Miss Universe 2004 and placed Top 15.

== Nuestra Belleza Mexico ==
Luna competed in 2003 as the delegate from Sinaloa in her country's national beauty pageant, Nuestra Belleza México, winning the competition and gaining the right to represent Mexico in Miss Universe 2004.

== Miss Universe 2004 ==
As her country's official representative to the 2004 Miss Universe pageant, held in Quito, Ecuador, Luna placed second to Miss Panama in the Best National Costume competition. On June 1, 2004, she became one of the top 15 semifinalists who competed for the Miss Universe title, giving Mexico their first placement in the pageant since Silvia Salgado in 1999.

Awards and achievements
Preceded by Marisol González	Nuestra Belleza México; 2003	Succeeded by Laura Elizondo
