= Nuestra Belleza Nuevo León 2009 =

- Date: June 22, 2009
- Presenters: Elsa Burgos, Arturo Carmona
- Venue: Teatro de la Ciudad, Monterrey, Nuevo León
- Broadcaster: Televisa
- Entrants: 10
- Placements: 5
- Winner: Adriana Treviño; Monterrey

Nuestra Belleza Nuevo León 2009, was a pageant in Nuevo León, Mexico was held at the Teatro de la Ciudad in Monterrey, Nuevo León on June 22, 2009. At the conclusion of the final night of competition, Adriana Treviño of Monterrey was crowned the winner. Treviño was crowned by outgoing Nuestra Belleza Nuevo León titleholder, Mariana González. Ten contestants competed for the state title.

The pageant was hosted by Elsa Burgos and Arturo Carmona.

== Results ==
=== Placements ===
Final results	Contestant
Nuestra Belleza Nuevo León 2009	Guadalupe - Adriana Treviño
Suplente / 1st Runner-up	San Nicolás- Nailé López
2nd Runner-up	San Pedro - Ana Cristina Ovalle
3rd Runner-up	Guadalupe - Elena Inurrigarro
4th Runner-up	Monterrey - Wergine García

=== Special awards ===
Award	Contestant
Miss Photogenic	Adriana Treviño
Miss Elegance	Adriana Treviño
Miss Sports	Daniela Longoria

== Judges ==
- Patricio Borghetti - Singer
- Grettell Valdéz - Actress
- Anagabriela Espinoza - Nuestra Belleza Mundo México 2007 & Miss International 2009
- Alejandra Villanueva - Nuestra Belleza Nuevo León 2003

== Background Music ==
- Alexander Acha - "Mujeres" & "Te Amo"
- Tush - "Acostumbrado"

== Contestants ==
Hometown	Contestant	Age	Height (m)
Apodaca	Priscila Elizondo Silva	22	1.78
Guadalupe	Amanda Montemayor Espinosa	22	1.71
Guadalupe	Elena Saraí Inurrigarro Rodríguez	18	1.78
Monterrey	Adriana Graciela Treviño Peralta	23	1.74
Monterrey	Mayela Teresa Ríos Gaytán	21	1.80
Monterrey	Wergin García Pedro	18	1.81
San Nicolás	Daniela Longoria Arenas	19	1.77
San Nicolás	Nailé López Martínez	19	1.74
San Pedro	Ana Cristina Ovalle Maiz	19	1.70
Santa Catarina	Yamilé Yazbek Rocha	23	1.74
