= Nuestra Belleza Baja California Sur 2009 =

- Venue: Hotel Presidente Intercontinental, Loas Cabos, Baja California Sur
- Broadcaster: Televisa
- Entrants: 8
- Winner: Giovanna Martínez; La Paz

Nuestra Belleza Baja California Sur 2009 was a beauty pageant held at the Hotel Presidente Intercontinental in Loas Cabos, Baja California Sur, Mexico in summer 2009. Giovanna Martínez of La Paz was crowned the winner among the eight contestants by the previous year's Nuestra Belleza Baja California Sur winner Estrella Navarro.

== Results ==
=== Placements ===
Final results	Contestant
Nuestra Belleza Baja California Sur 2009	Giovanna Martínez

== Contestants ==
Hometown	Contestant	Height (m)
La Paz	Andrea Santana	1.72
La Paz	Diana Jurado	1.70
La Paz	Evelyn Espinoza	1.73
La Paz	Giovanna Martínez	1.73
La Paz	Oliva Arango	1.74
La Paz	Yaneth García Formenti	1.77
La Paz	Ivete Montaño	1.76
Comondú	Ruany Miranda	1.78
