= Nuestra Belleza Nuevo León 2003 =

Mexican beauty pageant

- Date: July 16, 2003
- Presenters: Tere Marin, Fernando Lozano
- Entertainment: Río Roma, Aarón Díaz, Gustavo Lara
- Venue: Hotel Presidente Intercontinental, San Pedro, Nuevo León
- Broadcaster: Televisa
- Entrants: 8
- Placements: 4
- Winner: Alejandra Villanueva; San Nicolás de los Garza

Nuestra Belleza Nuevo León 2003, was held at the Hotel Presidente Intercontinental, San Pedro, Nuevo León on July 16, 2011. At the conclusion of the final night of competition Alejandra Villanueva of San Nicolás de los Garza was crowned the winner. He was crowned by outgoing Nuestra Belleza Nuevo León titleholder and Miss Expo World 2002 Carolina Salinas. Nine contestants competed for the title.

== Results ==
=== Placements ===
Final results	Contestant
Nuestra Belleza Nuevo León 2003	San Nicolás - Alejandra Villanueva
finalists	Monterrey - Alejandra Arredondo; Santiago- Brisseida Moya

== Background Music ==
- Patricio Borghetti

== Contestants ==
Hometown	Contestant	Age	Height (m)
Monterrey	Alejandra Arredondo	22	1.74
Monterrey	Judith Gonzalez	20	1.71
Monterrey	Monica Escamilla	21	1.70
San Nicolás	Alejandra Villanueva	20	1.76
Sabinas Hidalgo	Martha Garza Gomez	21	
Santiago	Briseida Moya	19	1.83
Santiago	Karen Lucero Tamez	19	1.78
Santiago	Paula Gabriela Martinez	19	1.69
