= Nuestra Belleza Nuevo León 2008 =

Beauty pageant

- Date: June 25, 2010
- Presenters: Priscila Perales, Arturo Carmona
- Venue: Teatro de la Ciudad, Monterrey, Nuevo León
- Broadcaster: Televisa
- Entrants: 10
- Placements: 5
- Winner: Mariana González; Monterrey

Nuestra Belleza Nuevo León 2008 was a beauty pageant which was held at the Teatro de la Ciudad in Monterrey, Nuevo León on June 25, 2008. At the conclusion of the final night of competition, Mariana González of Monterrey was crowned the winner. González was crowned by outgoing Nuestra Belleza Nuevo León titleholder and Nuestra Belleza Mundo México 2007, Anagabriela Espinoza. Ten contestants competed for the state title.

The pageant was hosted by Nuestra Belleza Nuevo León 2005 and Miss International 2007 Priscila Perales and Arturo Carmona.

== Results ==
=== Placements ===
Final results	Contestant
Nuestra Belleza Nuevo León 2008	Mariana González
Suplente / 1st Runner-up	Brenda Cavazos
2nd Runner-up	Alejandra Villaseñor
3rd Runner-up	Adriana Treviño
4th Runner-up	Yéssica Cantú

== Judges ==
- Alejandra Quintero - Nuestra Belleza Mundo México 1995
- Verónica Gutiérrez - Nuestra Belleza Nuevo León 2000
- Diana García - Nuestra Belleza Nuevo León 2001
- Carolina Salinas - Nuestra Belleza Nuevo León 2002 & Miss Expo World 2002
- Alejandra Villanueva - Nuestra Belleza Nuevo León 2003

== Background Music ==
- Kika Edgar - "Lo Siento mi Amor", "Acaríciame" & "Como Tú"
- Kudai - "Lejos De Aquí" y "Nada es Igual".

== See also ==
- Nuestra Belleza Nuevo León
