= Liza Echeverría =

Mexican actress, model and television presenter (born 1972)

- Born: Linda Elizabeth Echeverría Gray; August 29, 1972 (age 54); Mexico City, Mexico

Liza Echeverría (born Linda Elizabeth Echeverría Gray on August 29, 1972) is a Mexican actress, model and television presenter.

== Telenovelas ==
- Luz Clarita (1996) as Dana
- Misión S.O.S. (2004) as Sirena

== As a host ==
- Galardón a los grandes (1989)
- TVo (1991)
- Bailando por un sueño (2005)
- Cantando por un sueño (2006)

== As a guest ==
- Hoy 14 July 2004
- 100 mexicanos dijeron episode "Conductoras vs Conductores" (episode # 1.5) 15 August 2004
