= Mexicana Universal Baja California =

- Formation: 1994 (as Nuestra Belleza Baja California); 2017 (as Mexicana Universal Baja California)
- Type: Beauty Pageant
- Headquarters: Tijuana
- Location: Mexico
- Local Coordinator: Víctor Vázquez

Mexicana Universal Baja California (until 2016 called Nuestra Belleza Baja California) is a state-level contest in the state of Morelos, Mexico, which selects the state representative for the national contest Mexicana Universal (formerly called Nuestra Belleza México), thus aspiring to represent the country internationally on one of the platforms offered.

The state organization has achieved the following results since 1994:

- Winner: 1 (2003)
- 3rd Runner-up: 2 (2006, 2008)
- Top 10: 1 (2005)
- Top 15/16: 9 (1995, 1997, 2008, 2009, 2012, 2014, 2019, 2021, 2022)
- Top 20: 3 (2004, 2005, 2018)
- Unplaced: 14 (1994, 1996, 1998, 1999, 2001, 2002, 2010, 2011, 2013, 2015, 2016, 2017, 2023, 2025)
- Absences: 2 (2000, 2007)

== Titleholders ==
The following are the names of the annual winners of Mexicana Universal Baja California, listed in ascending order, as well as their results during the national Mexicana Universal pageant. State queens who represented the country in a current or past franchise of the national organization are also highlighted in a specific color.

Current Franchises:

- Competed at Miss Grand International.
- Competed at Miss International.
- Competed at Miss Charm.
- Competed at Reina Hispanoamericana.
- Competed at Miss Orb International.
- Competed at Nuestra Latinoamericana Universal.

Former Franchises:

- Competed at Miss Universe.
- Competed at Miss World.
- Competed at Miss Continente Americano.
- Competed at Miss Costa Maya International.
- Competed at Miss Atlántico Internacional.
- Competed at Miss Verano Viña del Mar.
- Competed at Reina Internacional del Café.
- Competed at Reina Internacional de las Flores.
- Competed at Señorita Continente Americano.
- Competed at Nuestra Belleza Internacional.

Year	Titleholder	Hometown	Placement	Special Award	Notes
2025	Sofía Nicole Cruz Méndez	Tijuana	-	-	Reina del Club de Leones Baja California 2026; Competed at Real Teen Beauty Baja California 2025
2024	In 2024, due to changes in the dates of the national pageant, the election of the state queens was postponed for one year.				
2023	Mariana García Trejo	Ensenada	-	-	Top 10 at Miss Asia Pacific International 2025; Miss Asia Pacific México 2025
2022	Alma Guadalupe Beltrán Gómez	Ensenada	Top 16	-	-
2021	Janine Krystel Aguayo González	Tijuana	Top 15	Best National Costume	-
2020	In 2020, due to the contingency of COVID-19 there was a lag in the year of the state contest				
2019	María Grisell Osuna Benett	Tijuana	Top 15	-	-
2018	Hilda Paola Guerrero Serrano	Mexicali	Top 20	-	2nd Runner-up at Nuestra Belleza Baja California 2014
2017	Betzaida Belém Acevedo Bravo	Tijuana	-	-	Competed at Reina de las Américas 2016; Reina de las Américas México 2016; 2nd Runner-up at Miss Earth Baja California 2015
Until 2016 the Title was Nuestra Belleza Baja California
2016	Nancy Verónica Möeller Guerrero	Tijuana	-	-	-
2015	Cynthia Paola Valdez Ruiz	Tijuana	-	-	1st Runner-up at Nuestra Belleza Baja California 2013
2014	María Gabriela Bibayoff Ureña	Ensenada	Top 15	-	Competed at Miss Ciudad de México 2017
2013	Ana Paulina Assemat Romero	Tijuana	-	-	-
2012	Jeraldine González Meza	Tijuana	Top 15	-	Competed at Miss F1 México 2015; Competed in Reina Hispanoamericana 2012; Reina Hispanoamericana México 2012
2011	Gabriela Acuña Eyraud	Tecate	-	-	-
2010	Nancy Marisol Galaz Piceno	Tijuana	-	-	-
2009	Ana Sofía García Gallego	Mexicali	Top 15	-	-
2008	Paulina Hernández Calderón	Mexicali	3rd Runner-up	-	Competed at Miss Continente Americano 2009; Miss Continente Americano México 2009
2007	Nadia Ramos Robles ^{1}	Tijuana	Did not Compete	-	-
2006	Alejandra Espinoza Cruz	Tijuana	3rd Runner-up	-	Nuestra Belleza Latina 2007
2005	Yovana Torres Ortíz	Tijuana	Top 20	-	-
2004	Bianca Grisel Avilés Urías	Tijuana	Top 20	-	-
2003	Yessica Guadalupe Ramírez Meza	Tijuana	Nuestra Belleza Mundo México	-	Top 15 at Miss World 2004; Was born in Sinaloa
2002	Cristhia Michelle Cuevas Herrera	Tijuana	-	-	-
2001	Bibian López Vallejo	Mexicali	-	-	-
2000	No candidate was sent				
1999	Astrid Rosalía Chávez Ramírez	Tijuana	-	-	-
1998	Aneli Lucero Barajas López	Mexicali	-	-	-
1997	Carolina Vanessa Castro Mendoza	Tijuana	Top 16	-	-
1996	Karla Baeza Noriega	Mexicali	-	-	-
1995	Alma Alicia Ballesteros Robles	Mexicali	Top 16	-	-
1994	María Luisa Peréz Mitre	Tijuana	-	-	-

^{1}Nadia Ramos originally she was going to compete in 2007 but had to leave the competition due to a family emergency and given the opportunity to participate in 2008.

== Designated Contestants ==
Starting in 2000, states were allowed to have more than one candidate, as some states were not sending candidates for various reasons. The following contestants from Baja California were invited to compete in the national pageant alongside the reigning queen, and in some cases, they achieved even better results.

Year	Titleholder	Hometown	Placement	Special Award	Notes
2016	Kenia Melissa Ponce Beltrán	Mexicali	-	-	2nd Runner-up at Miss Continentes Unidos 2019; Miss México Continentes Unidos 2019; Miss Baja California 2018; 1st Runner-up at Nuestra Belleza Baja California 2016; 1st Runner-up at Nuestra Belleza Baja California 2015; Señorita Fiestas del Sol 2011
2008	Nadia Ramos Robles ^{1}	Tijuana	Top 15	Miss Sports	-
2005	Marcela Rubio Villarreal	Mexicali	Top 10	Miss Sports	-
2001	Paulina García Coronel	Tijuana	-	-	-

^{1}Nadia Ramos originally she was going to compete in 2007 but had to leave the competition due to a family emergency and given the opportunity to participate in 2008.

== See also ==
- Miss Baja California
