= Marisol González =

Mexican actress TV personality

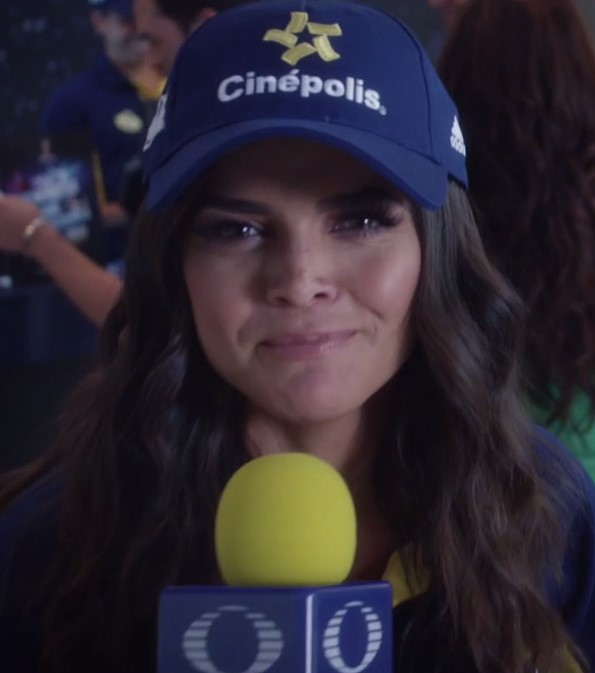
- Born: Marisol González Casas; 12 March 1983 (age 43); Torreón, Coahuila, Mexico
- Occupations: Actress; TV personality
- Years active: 2002–present
- Height: 1.74 m (5 ft 8 1/2 in)
- Title: Nuestra Belleza México 2002
- Spouse: Rafael Márquez Lugo (m. 2014)
- Children: 2

Marisol González Casas (Spanish pronunciation: [maɾiˈsol ɣonˈsales]; born 12 March 1983) is a Mexican actress, TV host and beauty pageant titleholder who represented Mexico at the Miss Universe pageant.

== Career ==
González rose to prominence after winning the Nuestra Belleza México 2002 title, which earned her the opportunity to competed in the Miss Universe 2003 pageant, held in Panama. Transitioning into acting, she debuted in the 2005 telenovela Vecinos and later appeared in notable productions such as La verdad oculta (2006) and Amores verdaderos (2012), showcasing her versatility in comedic and dramatic roles.

In 2008, she joined Televisa Deportes as a sports reporter and host, covering major events and broadcasts until 2019, during which she became a familiar face in Mexican sports media for her engaging on-air presence.

González expanded her television hosting portfolio by co-hosting the Mexican adaptation of The Masked Singer, titled ¿Quién es la Máscara?, starting from its fourth season in 2020, and served as the host for the sixth season of the drag competition series La Más Draga in 2023.

== Personal life ==
González was engaged to professional boxer Saúl "Canelo" Álvarez from 2010 to 2012, a relationship that garnered significant media attention due to their seven-year age difference.

In 2014, she married Mexican soccer player Rafael Márquez Lugo, with whom she has two daughters, and the couple has maintained a low-profile family life while she continues her professional endeavors.

Awards and achievements
Preceded by (Yucatán) Ericka Cruz	Nuestra Belleza México; 2002	Succeeded by (Sinaloa) Rosalva Luna
