= Lilián Villanueva =

Mexican model

- Born: Lilián Jesús Villanueva Chan; Chetumal Quintana Roo, Mexico
- Height: 1.70 m (5 ft 7 in)
- Beauty pageant titleholder
- Title: Nuestra Belleza Quintana Roo 2000; Nuestra Belleza Int'l México 2001; International Queen of Flowers 2001
- Hair color: Brown
- Eye color: Brown
- Major competitions: Nuestra Belleza México 2000 (Nuestra Belleza Int'l México); International Queen of Flowers 2001 (Winner)

Lilián Jesús Villanueva Chan is a Mexican model who became the only woman from her country to be crowned International Queen of Flowers and competed in Nuestra Belleza México 2000, obtaining the title of Nuestra Belleza Internacional México.

== Nuestra Belleza México 2000 ==
Born in Quintana Roo and raised in Chetumal, she represented her state and competed against forty-three other contestants for the national beauty title of Mexico, Nuestra Belleza México 2000, held in Apizaco, Tlaxcala on September 2, 2000.

She was chosen to represent Mexico in the 2001 Miss International pageant, but didn't compete because Nuestra Belleza México temporarily lost the franchise to send representatives to Miss International that year.

== Reina Internacional de las Flores ==
Instead, she competed in the International Queen of Flowers pageant held in Colombia where she became the favorite and was eventually chosen as the winner of the title on August 11, 2001.

== After Nuestra Belleza ==
In September 2009, she received the Corona al Merito award, for her winning International Queen of Flowers and overall performance as a beauty queen.

== See also ==
Nuestra Belleza México 2000

Awards and achievements
Preceded by (Uruguay) Natalia Figueiras	International Queen of Flowers; 2001	Succeeded by (Colombia) Johanna Cure Lemus
Preceded by Leticia Murray	Nuestra Belleza Internacional México; 2001	Vacant Title next held by Priscila Perales (2007)
