= Nuestra Belleza México 2000 =

7th edition of the Nuestra Belleza México beauty pageant

- Date: September 2, 2000
- Presenters: Lupita Jones, Gabriel Soto, Sergio Goyri
- Entertainment: Manuel Mijares, Francisco Céspedes, Ernesto D'Alessio, Patricio Borghetti, Jan, Innis
- Venue: Auditorio Emilio Sánchez Piedras, Apizaco, Tlaxcala, Mexico
- Broadcaster: Televisa
- Entrants: 43
- Placements: 20
- Withdrawals: Aguascalientes, Baja California, Campeche, Durango, Guerrero, Michoacán, Nayarit, Oaxaca
- Winner: Jacqueline Bracamontes; Jalisco

Nuestra Belleza México 2000, the 7th Nuestra Belleza México pageant, was held at the Auditorio Emilio Sánchez Piedras of Apizaco, Tlaxcala, Mexico on September 2, 2000. Forty-three contestants of the Mexican Republic competed for the national title, which was won by Jacqueline Bracamontes from Jalisco, who later competed in Miss Universe 2001 in Puerto Rico. Bracamontes was crowned by outgoing Nuestra Belleza México titleholder Leticia Murray. She was the first Jalisciense and the second winner of foreign descent (her maternal grandparents are Belgian) and the third blonde to win this Title.

The Nuestra Belleza Mundo México title was assumed by Paulina Flores from Sinaloa after Jacqueline Bracamontes won the right to compete in Miss Universe. Bracamontes could not hold both titles at once, so Paulina Flores as Suplente/1st Runner-up assumed the title. Flores later competed in Miss World 2000 in the United Kingdom. She was the first Sinaloense to win this Title.

The Nuestra Belleza Internacional México title (Best Hair Pantene) was won by Lilián Villanueva from Quintana Roo. She would have competed in Miss International 2001 in Japan, but the Nuestra Belleza México Organization lost the franchise of this international event that year and she could not compete. Villanueva is the first and only Quintanarroense to win this Title.

After three years, two events were held separately to select the two winners for the titles Nuestra Belleza México and Nuestra Belleza Mundo México.

== Results ==
=== Placements Nuestra Belleza México ===
| Final results | Contestant |
|---|---|
| Nuestra Belleza México 2000 | Jalisco – Jacqueline Bracamontes |
| Suplente/1st Runner-up | Sinaloa – Paulina Flores |
| 2nd Runner-up | Sonora – Ana Astiazarán |
| 3rd Runner-up | Quintana Roo – Lilián Villanueva |
| 4th Runner-up | Zacatecas – Eva Ruíz |
| Top 10 | (Chihuahua (state)) Chihuahua – Erika Valenzuela; (Mexico City) Distrito Federal – Arcelia Alverdi; (Mexico City) Distrito Federal – Paola Hinojosa; Nuevo León – Verónica Gutiérrez; Sinaloa – Minerva Rivera |
| Top 20 | Baja California Sur – Yessenia Moreno; Coahuila – Alma Cantú; Colima – Yadira Martínez; Nuevo León – Gisela Oviedo; Querétaro – Antonieta Fierro; San Luis Potosí – Marisel Puebla; Sinaloa – María González; Tamaulipas – Ivette Quintanilla; Veracruz – Emily Beer Ricco; Yucatán – Evelyn López |

=== Order of announcements ===
==== Top 10 ====
1. Sonora
2. Distrito Federal
3. Chihuahua
4. Zacatecas
5. Jalisco
6. Quintana Roo
7. Sinaloa
8. Distrito Federal
9. Sinaloa
10. Nuevo León

==== Top 5 ====
1. Zacatecas
2. Jalisco
3. Sonora
4. Quintana Roo
5. Sinaloa

=== Nuestra Belleza Mundo México ===
After three years, the contestants returned to take part in the semi-final competition entitled "Nuestra Belleza Mexico: Rumbo a Miss Mundo" where the Top 20 out of 43 candidates were chosen and it was announced that the winner of the Nuestra Belleza Mundo México title was Jacqueline Bracamontes. A week later she won the title of Nuestra Belleza México, which was then assumed by her Suplene/1st Runner-up Paulina Flores from Sinaloa, who curiously was also the Suplente/1st Runner-up in the final competition. Only the top 20 contestants participated in the final night.

The Nuestra Belleza Mundo México pageant was held at the Auditorio Emilio Sánchez Piedras of Apizaco, Tlaxcala, Mexico and was hosted by Joana Benedek and Alexis Ayala. It was officially the 3rd edition of the "Nuestra Belleza Mundo México" contest as an official separate pageant to choose Mexico's representative to Miss World. Although the Winner of this event also competed in the final night competition.

The musical part was enlivened by: Pablo Montero.

| Final results | Contestant |
|---|---|
| Nuestra Belleza Mundo México 2000 (Later crowned as Nuestra Belleza México 2000) | Jalisco – Jacqueline Bracamontes |
| Suplente/1st Runner-up (Later assumed Title as Nuestra Belleza Mundo México 2000) | Sinaloa – Paulina Flores |
| Top 20 | Baja California Sur – Yessenia Moreno; Coahuila – Alma Cantú; Colima – Yadira Martínez; (Chihuahua (state)) Chihuahua – Erika Valenzuela; (Mexico City) Distrito Federal – Arcelia Alverdi; (Mexico City) Distrito Federal – Paola Hinojosa; Nuevo León – Gisela Oviedo; Nuevo León – Verónica Gutiérrez; Querétaro – Antonieta Fierro; Quintana Roo – Lilián Villanueva; San Luis Potosí – Marisel Puebla; Sinaloa – María González; Sinaloa – Minerva Rivera; Sonora – Ana Astiazarán; Tamaulipas – Ivette Quintanilla; Veracruz – Emily Beer Ricco; Yucatán – Evelyn López; Zacatecas – Eva Ruíz |

=== Order of announcements ===
==== Top 20 ====
1. Coahuila
2. Baja California Sur
3. Sonora
4. Nuevo León
5. Veracruz
6. Sinaloa
7. Chihuahua
8. Distrito Federal
9. Zacatecas
10. Sinaloa
1. Yucatán
2. Colima
3. Nuevo León
4. San Luis Potosí
5. Tamaulipas
6. Sinaloa
7. Jalisco
8. Querétaro
9. Quinatana Roo
10. Distrito Federal

=== Special awards ===
| Award | Contestant |
|---|---|
| Miss Photogenic | Sonora – Ana Astiazarán |
| Trident Smile | Sinaloa – Paulina Flores |
| Best Hair Pantene | Quintana Roo -Lilián Villanueva |
| Edoardos Model | Sonora – Ana Astiazarán |
| Miss America Online | (Mexico City) Distrito Federal – Arcelia Alverdi |
| Miss St. Ives | Jalisco – Jacqueline Bracamontes |
| Best Communicator | Chihuahua – Erika Valenzuela |
| Lala Light Figure | Sinaloa – Minerva Rivera |
| Skin Hinds | Jalisco – Libertad Godínez |
| Best National Costume | San Luis Potosí – Marisel Puebla; "Diosa Canhuitz" |

== Judges ==
=== Preliminary competition ===
- Matilde Obregón – TV Notas' Director
- Riccardo Dalmacci – Actor
- Héctor Terrones – Fashion Designer
- José Luis Abarca – Fashion Designer
- Ernesto Valenzuela – El Modelo México 1999
- Pablo Méndez – Stylist
- Toño Mauri – Actor
- Deborah David – Model & Miss Guatemala finalist
- Nadine Markova – Photographer

=== Final competition ===
- Gustavo Adolfo Infante – Journalist
- Silvia Galván – Stylist
- Benjamín Alarcón – Consultant Psycho-Body Expression
- Verónica Jaspeado – Nuestra Belleza Tlaxcala 1994, Actress & Singer
- Carlos Latapi – Photographer
- Maritza Sayalero – Miss Universe 1979
- Gerardo Rebollo – Designer
- Vanessa Guzmán – Nuestra Belleza México 1995 & Actress
- Fernando Magallanes – Plastic Surgeon
- Frances Ondiviela – Miss España 1980 & Actress
- Carlos Topete – Marketing Manager

== Background music ==
- Opening Number: "Nuestra Belleza México" (Official Theme)
- Swimsuit Competition: "Popurrí" by Ernesto D'Alessio, Patricio Borghetti and Jan
- Intermediate: "Cuando me Enamoro" & "Aunque no Esté" by Manuel Mijares
- Evening Gown Competition: Innis
- Intermediate: "Dónde está la Vida" & "Quédate Más" by Francisco Céspedes
- Crowning Moment: "Nuestra Belleza México" (Official Theme)

== Contestants ==
| State | Contestant | Age | Height (m) | Hometown |
|---|---|---|---|---|
| Baja California Sur | Rosalinda Wayas Barroso | 20 | 1.70 | La Paz |
| Baja California Sur | Yessenia Moreno Castro | 22 | 1.75 | Los Cabos |
| Coahuila | Alma Mireya Cantú García | 20 | 1.85 | Torreón |
| Coahuila | Dulce René Ríos Torres | 21 | 1.81 | Torreón |
| Coahuila | María Elena Villalobos Sosa | 24 | 1.70 | Torreón |
| Colima | Martha Yadira Martínez | 23 | 1.78 | Colima |
| Chiapas | Ileana Ruíz Amaya | 20 | 1.69 | Chiapas |
| (Chihuahua (state)) Chihuahua | Erika Valenzuela Ortega | 21 | 1.75 | Chihuahua |
| (Chihuahua (state)) Chihuahua | Mirta Janet Bojórquez Loya | 23 | 1.72 | Chihuahua |
| (Mexico City) Distrito Federal | Arcelia Alverdi Luna | 23 | 1.74 | Mexico City |
| (Mexico City) Distrito Federal | Connie Velázquez Maya | 21 | 1.75 | Mexico City |
| (Mexico City) Distrito Federal | Mónica Portillo Escandón | 23 | 1.74 | Mexico City |
| (Mexico City) Distrito Federal | Paola Hinojosa Martínez | 20 | 1.73 | Mexico City |
| (State of Mexico) Estado de México | Airam García Cárdenas | 20 | 1.76 | Toluca |
| (State of Mexico) Estado de México | Susana Arlett Diazayas Jimeno | 21 | 1.69 | Toluca |
| Guanajuato | Esmeralda Marún Rodríguez | 21 | 1.73 | León |
| (Hidalgo (state)) Hidalgo | Marisol Mandujano Cerrilla | 21 | 1.72 | Huejutla |
| Jalisco | Jacqueline Bracamontes van Hoorde | 20 | 1.71 | Guadalajara |
| Jalisco | Libertad Godínez Herrera | 20 | 1.77 | Zapopan |
| Morelos | Alinne Shedid Harnen | 20 | 1.70 | Cuernavaca |
| Nuevo León | Gisela Patricia Oviedo Garza | 23 | 1.73 | Monterrey |
| Nuevo León | Verónica Gutiérrez de la Fuente | 24 | 1.74 | Monterrey |
| Puebla | Penelope García Gutiérrez | 20 | 1.74 | Puebla |
| Querétaro | María Antonieta Fierro Aguilera | 20 | 1.73 | Querétaro |
| Quintana Roo | Lilián Jesús Villanueva Chan | 20 | 1.72 | Chetumal |
| San Luis Potosí | Marisel Puebla Juárez | 21 | 1.71 | San Luis Potosí |
| Sinaloa | María González Corrales | 20 | 1.80 | Culiacán |
| Sinaloa | Minerva Rivera Mendiola | 22 | 1.69 | Los Mochis |
| Sinaloa | María Janeth Valenzuela | 22 | 1.68 | Culiacán |
| Sinaloa | Paulina Flores Arias | 20 | 1.77 | Culiacán |
| Sonora | Ana Lourdes Astiazarán Nieves | 20 | 1.80 | Hermosillo |
| Sonora | Karla Jazmín Arias Amarillas | 20 | 1.76 | Cd. Obregón |
| Sonora | Rubi López Ureña | 21 | 1.71 | Nogales |
| Tabasco | Elsa Villanueva González | 21 | 1.72 | Tenosique |
| Tamaulipas | Gabriela Josefina Soberón García | 20 | 1.69 | Reynosa |
| Tamaulipas | Minerva Ivette Quintanilla Barrios | 21 | 1.75 | Reynosa |
| Tlaxcala | María Guadalupe Lozada Díaz | 21 | 1.79 | Tlaxcala |
| Veracruz | Emily Beer Ricco | 21 | 1.70 | Coatzacoalcos |
| Veracruz | Luz Amelia Bulnes Talavera | 23 | 1.80 | Córdoba |
| Yucatán | Evelyn Esther López Pacheco | 24 | 1.70 | Mérida |
| Yucatán | Selena del Pilar Monsreal Vera | 21 | 1.72 | Mérida |
| Zacatecas | Daniella Rubio Maldonado | 20 | 1.77 | Fresnillo |
| Zacatecas | Eva Ruíz Torres | 20 | 1.74 | Zacatecas |

== Designates ==
- Baja California Sur – Rosalinda Wayas
- Coahuila – Dulce Ríos
- Coahuila – María Villalobos
- Chihuahua – Mirta Bojórquez
- (Mexico City) Distrito Federal – Paola Hinojosa
- (Mexico City) Distrito Federal – Mónica Portillo
- (Mexico City) Distrito Federal – Connie Velázquez
- (State of Mexico) Estado de México – Susana Diazayas
- Jalisco – Libertad Godínez
- Nuevo León – Gisela Oviedo
- Sinaloa – María González
- Sinaloa – Minerva Rivera
- Sinaloa – María Valenzuela
- Sonora – Karla Arias
- Sonora – Rubí López
- Tamaulipas – Minerva Quintanilla
- Veracruz – Luz Amelia Bulnes
- Yucatán – Selena Monsreal
- Zacatecas – Daniela Rubio

== Withdrawals ==
- Aguascalientes
- Baja California
- Campeche
- Durango
- Guerrero
- Michoacán
- Nayarit
- Oaxaca

== Historical significance ==
- Jalisco won the Nuestra Belleza México title for the first time.
- This was the second time a Winner of Nuestra Belleza México pageant is of foreign descent (Jacqueline Bracamontes, her maternal grandparents are Belgian).
- Sinaloa was the Suplente/1st Runner-up for the second time (before 1999) and won the Nuestra Belleza Mundo México title for the first time.
- Quintana Roo won the Nuestra Belleza Internacional México title for the first time.
- It is the first time in the history of the organization in which more than one representative is sent by a State.
- Jalisco do very well this year, obtaining the Nuestra Belleza Mundo Mexico title in the semi-final competition, but after being crowned as Nuestra Belleza México, the Nuestra Belleza Mundo México title automatically passed to the 1st Runner-up Sinaloa (Paulina Flores), who curiously was also the 1st Runner-up in the semi-final competition.
- For the first time is selected a Top 20 and only the Top 20 selected in the semi-final competition participated in the final night.
- For the first time, these states withdrew from the competition: Aguascalientes, Baja California, Campeche, Durango, Guerrero, Michoacán, Nayarit and Oaxaca.
- Distrito Federal and Nuevo León placed for the seventh consecutive year.
- Chihuahua placed for the third consecutive year.
- Baja California Sur, Sinaloa, Sonora and Tamaulipas placed for the second consecutive year.
- Coahuila, Jalisco, Quintana Roo and Yucatán returned to making calls to the semifinals after two years (1998), Colima after three years (1997), Querétaro, Veracruz and Zacatecas after four years (1996) and San Luis Potosí after five years (1995).
- States that were called to the semi-finals last year and this year failed to qualify were Guanajuato and Morelos.
- After two years hosting Nuestra Belleza México, Marco Antonio Regil didn't do in this edition.
- For the first time, Sergio Goyri and Gabriel Soto hosted the pageant with Lupita Jones.
- Sonora won Miss Photogenic and Edoardos Model Award for the first time.
- Quintana Roo won the Trident Smile and Best Hair Awards for the first time.
- Distrito Federal won Miss America Online for the first time.
- Jalisco won Miss St. Ives and Skin Hinds Award for the first time.
- Chihuahua won the Best Communicator Award for the first time.
- Sinaloa won the Lala Light Figure Award for the first time.
- San Luis Potosí won the Best National Costume award for the first time.
- The host delegate, María Guadalupe Lozada from Tlaxcala, failed to place in the semi-finals.
- Coahuila (Alma Cantú) is the tallest delegate in this edition (1.85 m).
- Estado de México (Susana Diazayas), Sinaloa (María Valenzuela) and Tamulipas (Gabriela Soberón) are the shortest delegates in this edition (1.68 m).

== Contestant notes ==
- Jalisco – Jacqueline Bracamontes represented her country in Miss Universe 2001 held at Coliseo Rubén Rodríguez, Bayamón, Puerto Rico on May 11, 2001, where she didn't place. After being crowned Nuestra Belleza México in 2000, she decided to pursue a television career. She began her career hosting various award shows and special programs, including Acafest, Premios TVyNovelas, and Fiesta Mexicana. In 2003, Bracamontes was cast in the Mexican telenovela Alegrijes y Rebujos, produced by Rosy Ocampo. In 2006, she landed her first lead role in the Mexican novela Heridas de amor, alongside Brazilian born actor Guy Ecker. In 2008 she starred in the comedic Mexican telenovela Las Tontas No Van al Cielo, alongside Jaime Camil, which was extremely successful in both the Latin American and United States market. After finishing filming with Las Tontas No Van al Cielo, Bracamontes starred in Sortilegio, with Cuban actor William Levy. Bracamontes has been linked to actor Valentino Lanús, soccer star Francisco "Kikin" Fonseca, and actor Arturo Carmona. On January 11, 2008, she confirmed her new relationship with Fernando Schoenwald. The couple ended their relationship in May 2009. Bracamontes was chosen as one of the killers in the popular series Mujeres Asesinas which premiered in the fall of 2010.
- (State of Mexico) Estado de México – Susana Diazayas is a Television Actress.
- Quintana Roo – Lilián Villanueva originally would participate in Miss International 2001, but the Nuestra Belleza México Organization lost the franchise and she couldn't compete in that event, although she represented Mexico in the contest Reinado Internacional de las Flores 2001 in Medellín, Colombia where she won 1st place.
- Sinaloa – Paulina Flores represented her country in Miss World 2000, held at the Millennium Dome in London, UK on November 30, 2000. Also she was finalist in the Top 5 in Miss Mesoamérica 2001. Paulina is currently a professional fashion model, and has been represented by several national and international modeling agencies.
- Yucatán – Evelyn López competed in Miss Costa Maya International 2001.
- Zacatecas – Eva Ruíz represented Mexico in the Reinado Internacional del Café 2001 in Manizales, Colombia where she won 2nd place.

=== Crossovers ===
Contestants who previously competed or will compete at other beauty pageants:

Miss Universe

- 2001: Jalisco: Jacqueline Bracamontes

Miss World

- 2000: Sinaloa: Paulina Flores

Miss Costa Maya International

- 2001: Yucatán: Evelyn López

Reinado Internacional de las Flores

- 2001: Quintana Roo: Lilián Villanueva (Winner)

Reinado Internacional del Café

- 2001: Zacatecas: Eva Ruiz (1st Runner-up)

Miss Mesoamérica

- 2001: Sinaloa: Paulina Flores (Top 5)
