= Miss Global Zimbabwe =

Beauty pageant

Miss Zimbabwe International
- Formation: 2012
- Type: Beauty Pageant
- Headquarters: Harare
- Location: Zimbabwe
- Members: Miss International; Miss Supranational; Miss Global; Miss Heritage; Miss Globe International; Miss Global International
- Official language: English
- President: Tare Munzara
- Website: Official page

Miss Global Zimbabwe is a National Beauty Pageant in Zimbabwe that was founded in 2012 by Tare Munzara and Ronald Tisauke, that promotes beauty, charity and tourism. The Pageant sends its winner to Miss Globe International and Miss Global International. Its 1st runner up goes to Miss International Pageant.

== History ==
The first officially Miss Global Zimbabwe in 2012 was Mutsa Mutare who represented Zimbabwe at the Miss Global International 2012 in Jamaica. Before her there were many Zimbabwean models who participated to Miss Global International in which the first Miss Global International title winner in 2006 was Ropa Garise and the second to win the international pageant in 2007 was Miss Zimbabwe 2007, Cynthia Muvirimi.

The current title holder for Miss Global Zimbabwe 2013-2014 is Nyasha Mutsauri becoming the official representative of her country to Miss Global International Miss Globe International. Nyasha Mutsauri recently was the host for the international pageant Miss Heritage 2013 Pageant which was staged in Harare Zimbabwe. She also has done a lot of charity work. Nyasha Mutsauri could not travel to Miss Global International 2013 which was held in Jamaica due to family reasons. However her Director Tare Munzara managed to make a plan to ensure that she represents Zimbabwe at another international Pageant. She is the official representative for Zimbabwe for Miss Globe international 2014.

== Titleholders ==
=== Miss International Zimbabwe ===
- : Declared as Winner
- : Ended as runner-up or top 5/6 qualification
- : Ended as one of the finalists or semifinalists
- : Ended as special awards winner

| Year | Province | Miss Zimbabwe | Placement at Miss International | Special Awards | Notes |
|---|---|---|---|---|---|
| 2026 | Matabeleland North | Ruvimbo Njomboro | Did not compete | | |
| 2025 | Harare | Yollanda Chimbarami | 1st Runner-Up | Miss International Africa | She was one of the runners-up in Miss World Zimbabwe 2024 and was initially set to compete in Miss Supranational 2024. However, she withdrew from the competition. She was later expected to participate in Miss Supranational 2025, but once again, this did not come to fruition due to the crowning of the new Miss Supranational Zimbabwe 2025, Pauline Marere. |
| 2024 | Harare | Lisa Sibanda | Did not compete | | |
| 2023 | Masvingo | Charlotte Muziri | Unplaced | Miss Fitness | |
| 2022 | Did not compete | | | | |
Due to the impact of COVID-19 pandemic, no pageant between 2020 and 2021
| 2019 | Harare | Jemimah Kandemiiri | Unplaced | | |
| 2018 | Harare | Tania Tatenda Aaron | Unplaced | | Miss Zimbabwe International directorship. |
Did not compete between 2012—2017
| 2011 | Harare | Lisa Morgan | Unplaced | Miss Impressive | Miss World Zimbabwe directorship ― Morgan was crowned Miss Universe Zimbabwe but she failed to go to the Miss Universe then she moved to Miss International. |

=== Miss Supranational Zimbabwe ===
- : Declared as Winner
- : Ended as runner-up or top 5/6 qualification
- : Ended as one of the finalists or semifinalists
- : Ended as special awards winner

| Year | Province | Miss Zimbabwe | Placement at Miss Supranational | Special Awards | Notes |
|---|---|---|---|---|---|
| 2027 | TBA | TBA | TBA | | |
| 2026 | Manicaland | Nicole Nyawera | Top 24 | | |
| 2025 | Masvingo | Pauline Marere | Unplaced | Top 6 - Supra Chat; Top 20 - Miss Influencer Opportunity | |
| 2025 | Harare | Yollanda Chimbarami | Did not compete | | |
| 2024 | Harare | Yollanda Chimbarami | Did not compete | | |
| 2023 | Harare | Sakhile Zibusiso Dube | Top 24 | Supra Model; Miss Supranational Africa | |
| 2022 | Masvingo | Kimberly Tatenta Mayoyo | Unplaced | | Farai Zembeni directorship. |
| 2021 | Did not compete | | | | |
Due to the impact of COVID-19 pandemic, no pageant in 2020
Did not compete between 2018—2019
| 2017 | Harare | Letwin Tatenda Tiwaringe | Unplaced | | |
Did not compete between 2014—2016
| 2013 | Harare | Lungile Mathe | Unplaced | | |
| 2012 | Did not compete | | | | |
| 2011 | Harare | Hildah Mabu | Unplaced | | |

=== Miss Global Zimbabwe ===
- : Declared as Winner
- : Ended as runner-up or top 5/6 qualification
- : Ended as one of the finalists or semifinalists
- : Ended as special awards winner

| Year | Province | Miss Zimbabwe | Placement at Miss Global | Special Awards | Notes |
|---|---|---|---|---|---|
| 2025 | Did not compete | | | | |
| 2024 | No pageant held in 2024 | | | | |
| 2023 | Harare | Mitchell Kudzai Matizha | Unplaced | | |
| 2021/2022 | Harare | Tania Tatenda Aaron | Top 25 | | |
| 2019 | Harare | Tania Tatenda Aaron | Unplaced | | |
