= Lourdes Paola Aguilar =

Mexican model and beauty pageant titleholder

- Born: Lourdes Paola Aguilar Concha; Progreso, Yucatán, Mexico
- Education: Universidad Interamericana para el Desarrollo
- Height: 1.70 m (5 ft 7 in)
- Beauty pageant titleholder
- Hair color: Black
- Eye color: Green
- Major competitions: Miss Earth México 2012 (Winner); Miss Earth 2012 (Top 16)

Lourdes Paola Aguilar Concha is a Mexican model and beauty pageant titleholder who was crowned Miss Earth México. She became Mexico's representative to Miss Earth 2012 in which she achieved a Top 16 placement.

== Early life and education ==
Aguilar was born in Progreso, Yucatán. She enrolled at the Universidad Interamericana para el Desarrollo (UNID), where she earned a bachelor's degree in Communication Sciences. Aguilar balanced her studies with environmental activism, promoting beach cleanups along the Yucatecan coast, reforestation campaigns, and recycling workshops.

== Pageantry ==
=== Miss Earth Mexico 2012 ===
Aguilar won the title of Miss Earth México 2012 against 32 delegates during the pageant finale held in the Yucatán Siglo XXI Convention Centre in Mérida, Yucatán on September 22, 2012. She was crowned by the outgoing titleholder, Casandra Ananké of Distrito Federal.

=== Miss Earth 2012 ===
Aguilar represented Mexico at Miss Earth 2012 which was held on November 24, 2012, at the Versailles Palace in Las Piñas, Metro Manila, Philippines. 80 delegates from different countries and territories competed for the prestigious and coveted beauty title. At the final coronation show, she achieved a placement in the Top 16.

Awards and achievements
Preceded by Casandra Ananké	Miss Earth México; 2012	Next: Kristal Silva
Preceded by Jéssica Martínez Vadillo	Miss Earth Yucatán; 2014	Next: Lucy Patrón Castro
