= Miss Earth México 2009 =

3rd edition of Miss Earth México beauty pageant

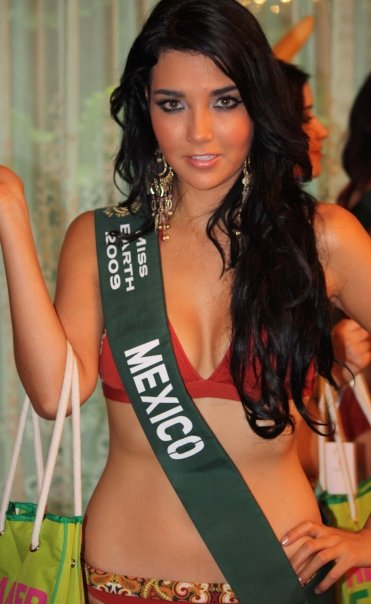
- Natalia Quiñonez Pérez
- Date: September 29, 2009
- Venue: Yucatán Siglo XXI Convention Centre, Mérida
- Broadcaster: DISH Network L.L.C.
- Entrants: 32
- Placements: 12
- Winner: Natalia Quiñonez; Jalisco

The 3rd annual Miss Earth México pageant, was held at the Yucatán Siglo XXI Convention Centre in Mérida, Yucatán on September 29, 2009. Thirty-two delegates from the Republic of Mexico will competed for the national title.

At the end of the event, Abigail Elizalde crowned her successor Natalia Quiñones as Miss Earth México. Represented Mexico at the Miss Earth 2009 pageant which held in Boracay, Malay, Aklan, Philippines on 22 November where she did not placed.

== Results ==
=== Placements ===
Final results	Contestant
Miss Earth México 2009	Jalisco – Natalia Quiñones Pérez
Miss Air	Chihuahua – Pamela Olivas
Miss Water	Baja California Sur – Jessica Formenti
Miss Fire	Morelos – Siri Mazari
Top 12	Aguascalientes – Mariana Bermudez; Colima – Yolatl Gómez; Durango – María Alvarado; Nayarit – Guadalupe Olguin; San Luis Potosí – Evelyn Bautista; Sinaloa – Kenia Arroyo; Tabasco – Gabriela Ramírez; Veracruz – Ilse Riande

=== Special awards ===
Award	Contestant
Miss Friendship	Nuevo León – Alejandra Treviño
Miss Photogenic	Aguascalientes – Mariana Bermúdez
Miss Internet	Campeche – Cenovia Novelo
Miss Elegance	Jalisco – Natalia Quiñones
Best in Swimsuit	Baja California Sur – Jessica Formenti
Best Hair	Tamaulipas – Isabel Beuchot
Best Ecological Project	Colima – Yolatl Gómez
