= Miss Earth México 2008 =

2nd edition of Miss Earth México beauty pageant

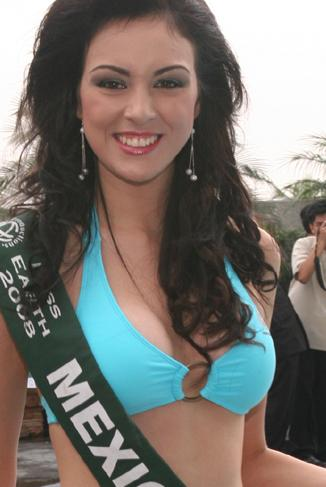
- Abigail Elizalde Romo
- Date: September 5, 2008
- Venue: Yucatán Siglo XXI Convention Centre, Mérida
- Broadcaster: DISH Network L.L.C.
- Entrants: 32
- Placements: 10
- Winner: Abigail Elizalde; Coahuila

The 2nd annual Miss Earth México pageant, was held at the Yucatán Siglo XXI Convention Centre in Mérida, Yucatán on September 5, 2008. Thirty-two delegates from the Republic of Mexico will competed for the national title.

At the end of the event, Fernanda Cánovas crowned her successor Abigail Elizalde as Miss Earth México 2008. Represented Mexico at the Miss Earth 2008 pageant which held in Angeles City, Philippines on 9 November. She finished as second runner-up or Miss Water 2008.

== Results ==
=== Placements ===
Final results	Contestant
Miss Earth México 2008	Coahuila – Abigail Elizalde Romo
Miss Air	Chihuahua – Mónica Jiménez
Miss Water	Jalisco – Karina López
Miss Fire	San Luis Potosí – Patricia Gómez
Top 10	Aguascalientes – Jovana Eguía; Baja California – Jassel Benítez; Baja California Sur - Fhannya Urbina; Chiapas – Gilda Alvarado; Michoacán – Arianna Ramírez; Sonora – Denisse Correa

=== Special awards ===
Award	Contestant
Miss Friendship	Campeche – Sayde Vela
Miss Photogenic	Baja California – Yarahi Benítez
Miss Elegance	Oaxaca – María José
Best National Costume	Michoacán – Arianna Ramírez
Best Ecological Project	Baja California Sur - Fhannya Urbina
