= Nuestra Belleza Yucatán 2012 =

- Date: June 28, 2012
- Venue: Salón Mérida, Centro de Convenciones Yucatán Siglo XXI, Mérida, Yucatán
- Broadcaster: Televisa
- Entrants: 6
- Placements: 3
- Winner: Marsha Ramírez; Mérida

Nuestra Belleza Yucatán 2012, was a pageant held in the Salón Mérida of Centro de Convenciones Yucatán Siglo XXI in Mérida, Yucatán on June 18, 2012. At the conclusion of the final night of competition Marsha Ramírez from Mérida was crowned the winner. Ramírez was crowned by outgoing Nuestra Belleza Yucatán titleholder Jessica Duarte. Six contestants competed for the title.

== Results ==
=== Placements ===
Final results	Contestant
Nuestra Belleza Yucatán 2012	Marsha Ramírez
Suplente / 1st Runner-up	Mariana Dávalos
2nd Runner-up	Lucelly Patrón

== Judges ==
- Ofelia Correa - Regional Coordinator of Nuestra Belleza México
- Luis Moya - Dermatologist
- Abril Cervera Bates - Designer

== Contestants ==
Hometown	Contestant	Age	Height (m)
Mérida	María José Castillo Conde	18	1.71
Mérida	Lízbeth Marlene Aldana Ditrich	23	1.69
Mérida	Mariana Dávalos Alejandri	20	1.78
Mérida	Avril Justo Canto	23	1.68
Mérida	Lucely del Carmen Patrón Castro	20	1.70
Mérida	Marsha Ramírez Martínez	23	1.72
