= Miss Universe Veracruz =

Beauty pageant in Veracruz, Mexico

- Formation: 2024
- Type: Beauty pageant
- Headquarters: Veracruz
- Location: Mexico

Miss Universe Veracruz is a state-level contest in the state of Veracruz, Mexico, which selects the state representative for the national contest Miss Universe Mexico, thus aspiring to represent the country in Miss Universe.

The state organization has achieved the following results since 2016:

- Top 10: 1 (2025)
- Unplaced: 1 (2024)

== Titleholders ==
The following are the names of the annual winners of Miss Universe Veracruz, listed in ascending order, as well as their results during the national Miss Universe México pageant. State queens who represented the country in a current or past franchise of the national organization are also highlighted in a specific color.

Current Franchises:

- Competed at Miss Universe.

Year	Titleholder	Hometown	Placement	Special Award	Notes
2026	Génesis Vera Fernández	Boca del Río	3rd Runner-up		Top 12 at Miss Earth 2025; Miss Earth México 2025; Miss Earth Veracruz 2025; Competed at Miss Latinoamérica 2023; Miss Latinoamérica México 2023; Reina del Carnaval de Veracruz 2023
2025	Fernanda “Pumar” Gómez Ramos	Veracruz	Top 10	Miss Popular Vote	Reina del Carnaval de Veracruz 2026; Miss Elite 2021; Miss Elite México 2021; Competed at Teen Universe México 2017; Teen Universe Veracruz 2017
2024	Leilani Vanessa Montiel Bravo	Tihuatlán	-	-	Competed at Teen Universe México 2023; Teen Universe Veracruz 2023; Señorita Independencia Tihuatlán 2022

== See also ==
- Mexicana Universal Veracruz
- Miss Veracruz
- Miss Earth Veracruz
