= Miss Earth Veracruz =

Beauty pageant in Veracruz, Mexico

- Formation: 2007
- Type: Beauty pageant
- Headquarters: Veracruz
- Location: Mexico

Miss Earth Veracruz is a state-level contest in the state of Veracruz, Mexico, which selects the state representative for the national contest Miss Earth México, thus aspiring to represent the country internationally on one of the platforms offered.

The state organization has achieved the following results since 2016:

- Winner: 4 (2020, 2025, 2026, 2027)
- 2nd Runner-up: 1 (2015)
- 3rd Runner-up: 1 (2019)
- Top 8: 3 (2011, 2013, 2014)
- Top 12/15/16: 3 (2009, 2012, 2024)
- Top 18/20: 2 (2016, 2018)
- Unplaced: 5 (2007, 2008, 2010, 2017, 2023)

== National Queens ==
- Rebeca Rodríguez - Miss Earth México 2027
- Maryfe Aguilar - Miss Global International México 2026
- Adriana Bautista - The Miss Globe México 2025 (Designated)
- Génesis Vera - Miss Earth México 2025 (Designated)
- Martha Briano - Universal Woman México 2023 (Designated)
- Astrid Moraga - Miss Eco México 2021 (Designated)
- Perla Domínguez - Reina de la Piña México 2019 (Designated)
- Martha Briano - Miss Intercontinental México 2016 (Designated)

== Titleholders ==
The following are the names of the annual winners of Miss Earth Veracruz, listed in ascending order, as well as their results during the national Miss Earth México pageant. State queens who represented the country in a current or past franchise of the national organization are also highlighted in a specific color.

Current Franchises:

- Competed at Miss Earth.
- Competed at Miss Eco International.
- Competed at The Miss Globe.
- Competed at Miss Freedom of the World.
- Competed at Miss Panamerican International.
- Competed at Miss Polo International.
- Competed at Reina Mundial de la Piña.

Former Franchises:

- Competed at Miss Intercontinental.
- Competed at Miss Supranational.
- Competed at Miss Exlusive of the World.
- Competed at Reina Internacional del Trópico.
- Competed at Miss Heritage.

Year	Titleholder	Hometown	Placement	Special Award	Notes
2027	Rebeca Aguilar Rodríguez	Orizaba	Miss Earth México		Will compete at Miss Earth 2027
2026	Adriana Lizeth Bautista Reyes (Designated National Queen)	Misantla	The Mis Globe México	-	Top 12 at Mexicana Universal 2026; Reina del Carnaval de Misantla 2026; Mexicana Universal Veracruz 2025; Top 10 at The Miss Globe 2025; 2nd Runner-up at Miss Intercontinental México 2024; Miss Intercontinental Veracruz 2024; Competed at Miss Veracruz 2022
2026	Juliana Pesqueda Malpica (Resigned)	Alvarado	Did not Compete	-	Miss Earth Veracruz-Fire 2027
2026	María Fernanda Aguirre González (Assumed)	Yanga	TBD		Reina del Carnaval Yanga 2023
2025	Génesis Vera Fernández	Boca del Río	Miss Earth México	-	3rd Runner-up at Miss Universe México 2026; Miss Universe Veracruz 2026; Top 12 at Miss Earth 2025; Competed at Miss Latinoamerica 2023; Miss Latinoamerica México 2023; Reina del Carnaval de Veracruz 2023
2024	Naomy Cámara Ortiz	Alvarado	Top 15	-	-
2023	Montserrat González Pereyra	Boca del Río	-	Miss Fotogénica	Reina Mundial de la Piña 2024; Reina de la Piña México 2024; Competed at Miss Earth Veracruz 2021; Competed at Miss Teen Mundial Veracruz 2020
2022	In 2022, due to changes in the dates of the national pageant, the election of the state queens was postponed for one year.				
2021	Amairani Sosa Nambo (Resigned)	Ciudad Isla	Did not Compete	-	1st Runner-up at Mexicana Universal Veracruz 2022
2020	Indira Pérez Meneses	Las Choapas	Miss Earth México	-	Reina de la Fiesta de la Alegría de Las Choapas 2024; Competed at Miss Earth 2022; Competed at Miss Earth Veracruz 2017
2019	Perla Viviana Domínguez Triana	Juan Rodríguez Clara	Miss Earth-Fire (3rd Runner-up)	-	Reina de la Piña México 2019; Top 15 at Miss Supranational México 2019; Reina de la Feria de la Piña 2017
2018	Gloria Elvira del Ángel Mar	Chontla	Top 18	Miss Multimedia	-
2017	Alondra Jacqueline Sánchez Rivera (Resigned)	Tecolutla	Did not Compete	-	-
2017	Paula Astrid Moraga Molina (Assumed)	Veracruz	-	-	Competed at Miss Eco International 2021; Miss Eco México 2021; Miss Earth Veracruz-Air 2017
2016	Claudia Victoria Aquino Oliver	Poza Rica	Top 20	-	-
2015	Martha Leticia Suárez Briano	Boca del Río	Miss Earth-Water (2nd Runner-up)	Best Body	Top 10 at Universal Woman 2023; Universal Woman México 2023; Top 10 at Mexicana Universal 2018; Mexicana Universal Veracruz 2017; Competed at Miss Intercontinental 2016; Miss Intercontinental México 2016; 3rd Runner-up at Nuestra Belleza Veracruz 2013
2014	Lidia Florencia Arano Herrera	Tierra Blanca	Top 8	-	Competed at Mexicana Universal Veracruz 2018; Competed at Miss Hispanoamerica Internacional 2015; Miss Belleza Turismo México 2015; Miss Belleza Turismo Veracruz 2015; 2nd Runner-up at Nuestra Belleza Veracruz 2014
2013	Eréndira Casarín		Top 8	Miss Internet	-
2012	Dalia Usla González		Top 16	-	-
2011	Nayeli Cebrián García		Top 8	Best Ecological Project	-
2010	Sbeydy Elisa Reyna Salomón		-	-	-
2009	Ilse Riande Sagaón		Top 12	-	-
2008			-	-	-
2007			-	-	-

== See also ==
- Miss Universe Veracruz
- Mexicana Universal Veracruz
- Miss Veracruz
