= Miss Earth México 2012 =

- Entrants: 32
- Placements: 8

Miss Earth México 2012, the 11th annual national beauty pageant of Miss Earth México, will be held late summer of 2012. 2011 crowned winner, Casandra Ananké Becerra Vázquez from Distrito Federal, will crown the new winner.

The winner of Miss Earth México 2012 will represent Mexico in the international Miss Earth 2012 pageant which will be held on November 24, 2012 in Philippines.

== Results ==
Final results	Contestant
Miss Earth México 2012	Yucatán - Paola Aguilar
Miss Air (1st Runner-up)	Baja California Sur - Ilse Vázquez
Miss Water (2nd Runner-up)	Colima - Mónica Casilla
Miss Fire (3rd Runner-up)	Sinaloa - Abigail García
Top 8	Chihuahua - Cristina Caballero; Durango - Christina Hernández; Puebla -Nydia Galindo; Tabasco - Isamara Quiroga
Top 16	Aguascalientes - Issa García; Baja California - Jeaneth Aguilar; Campeche - Aracely Azar; Jalisco - Ana Karen Guerra; Oaxaca - Yarith Cerón; Sonora - Darleth Navarro; Veracruz - Dalia Usla; Zacatecas - Susana Espinosa

== Special awards ==
Special awards were given during the Miss Earth México 2012 coronation night as follows:

Award	Contestant	State
Miss Photogenic	Mónica Casilla Sánchez	Colima
Miss Congeniality		
Miss Internet	Abigail García García	Sinaloa
Best in Swimsuit		
Best Hair		
Best Ecological Project	Aracely Azar Saravia	Campeche

== Delegates ==
The following is the list of delegates that represented the 32 States of Mexico as listed in the Miss Earth Mexico 2012 website including their height and age during the pageant:

State	Titleholder	Age	Height
Aguascalientes	Issa García Acero	18	1.76 m (5 ft 9 1/2 in)
Baja California	Jeaneth Aguilar Alcazar	18	1.75 m (5 ft 9 in)
Baja California Sur	Ilse Vázquez Villegas	18	1.75 m (5 ft 9 in)
Campeche	Aracely Azar Saravia	23	1.76 m (5 ft 9 1/2 in)
Chiapas	Laura Patricia Pinto Pineda	23	1.70 m (5 ft 7 in)
Chihuahua	Cristina Caballero de la O	18	1.75 m (5 ft 9 in)
Coahuila	Ana Rosa Martinez Tames	20	1.73 m (5 ft 8 in)
Colima	Mónica Casilla Sánchez	23	1.73 m (5 ft 8 in)
Mexican Federal District	Edith Vargas Monroy	21	1.80 m (5 ft 11 in)
Durango	Martha Christina Hernández González	21	1.73 m (5 ft 8 in)
México (state)	Andrea Sánchez Olvera	21	1.72 m (5 ft 7 1/2 in)
Guanajuato	Andrea Olivera Valdés	21	1.73 m (5 ft 8 in)
Guerrero	Katia Romero Bejar	19	1.71 m (5 ft 7 1/2 in)
Hidalgo	Dania Jimena Lara Luna	18	1.68 m (5 ft 6 in)
Jalisco	Ana Karen Guerra de Velasco	22	1.71 m (5 ft 7 1/2 in)
Michoacán	Elizabeth Díaz Díaz	19	1.70 m (5 ft 7 in)
Morelos	Paola Marín Jasso	21	1.69 m (5 ft 6 1/2 in)
Nayarit	Yareli Fuentes Bravo	18	1.70 m (5 ft 7 in)
Nuevo León	Evelyn Castro Martínez	21	1.72 m (5 ft 7 1/2 in)
Oaxaca	Sayra Yaritza Cerón Enríquez	18	1.74 m (5 ft 8 1/2 in)
Puebla	Nydia Galindo Salas	21	1.83 m (6 ft 0 in)
Querétaro	Astrid Ruedas Vivas	19	1.72 m (5 ft 7 1/2 in)
Quintana Roo	Brissa Selva Romero	22	1.71 m (5 ft 7 1/2 in)
San Luis Potosí	Lilia Estrada Moctezuma	18	1.73 m (5 ft 8 in)
Sinaloa	Abigail García García	20	1.77 m (5 ft 9 1/2 in)
Sonora	Darleth Navarro Salcido	20	1.78 m (5 ft 10 in)
Tabasco	Claudia Isamara Quiroga Rodríguez	18	1.71 m (5 ft 7 1/2 in)
Tamaulipas	Blanca Flor Moreno Cantú	20	1.78 m (5 ft 10 in)
Tlaxcala	Eunice Martínez Márquez	21	1.78 m (5 ft 10 in)
Veracruz	Dalia Usla González	20	1.68 m (5 ft 6 in)
Yucatán	Paola Aguilar Concha	19	1.71 m (5 ft 7 1/2 in)
Zacatecas	Susana Espinosa Galáviz	18	1.74 m (5 ft 8 1/2 in)

== See also ==
- Miss Earth Mexico
