= Natalia Quiñones =

Mexican model and beauty pageant titleholder

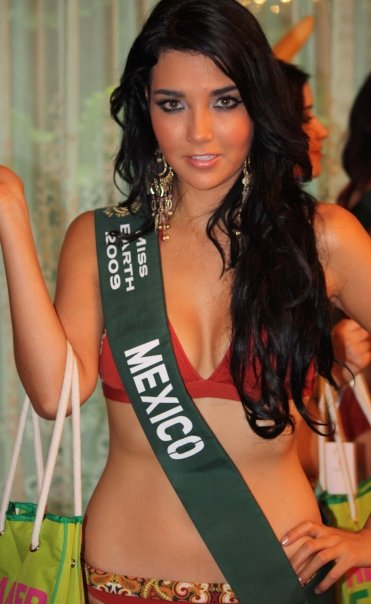
- Born: Natalia Quiñones Pérez; Zapopan, Jalisco, Mexico
- Height: 1.78 m (5 ft 10 in)
- Beauty pageant titleholder
- Title: Miss Earth México 2009
- Hair color: Black
- Eye color: Hazel

Natalia Quiñones Pérez (born 1986) is a Mexican model and beauty queen who won the Miss Earth México. She represented Mexico at the Miss Earth 2009, an annual international pageant promoting environmental awareness.

== Miss Earth México 2009 ==
Quiñones was crowned Miss Earth México 2009, the third edition of the national pageant. She beat 31 other contestants representing each state of the Republic of Mexico in the beauty contest that promotes environmental awareness. She was crowned by the outgoing titleholder, Abigail Elizalde on 27 September 2009 at Yucatán Siglo XXI Convention Centre, Mérida.

== Miss Earth 2009 ==
Quiñones represented Mexico in the ninth edition of Miss Earth beauty pageant held at the Boracay Ecovillage Resort and Convention Center in the Island of Boracay, Philippines, which started on November 1, 2009, and concluded on November 22, 2009. The Miss Earth winner serves as the spokesperson for the Miss Earth Foundation, the United Nations Environment Programme (UNEP) and other environmental organizations. At the end of the event she did not place in the top 16.

Awards and achievements
Preceded by (Coahuila) Abigail Elizalde	Miss Earth México; 2009	Next: (Tabasco) Claudia Mollinedo
Preceded by Karina López Pérez	Miss Earth Jalisco; 2009	Next: Carla Angelli Tapia
