= Miss Earth México 2014 =

8th edition of Miss Earth México beauty pageant

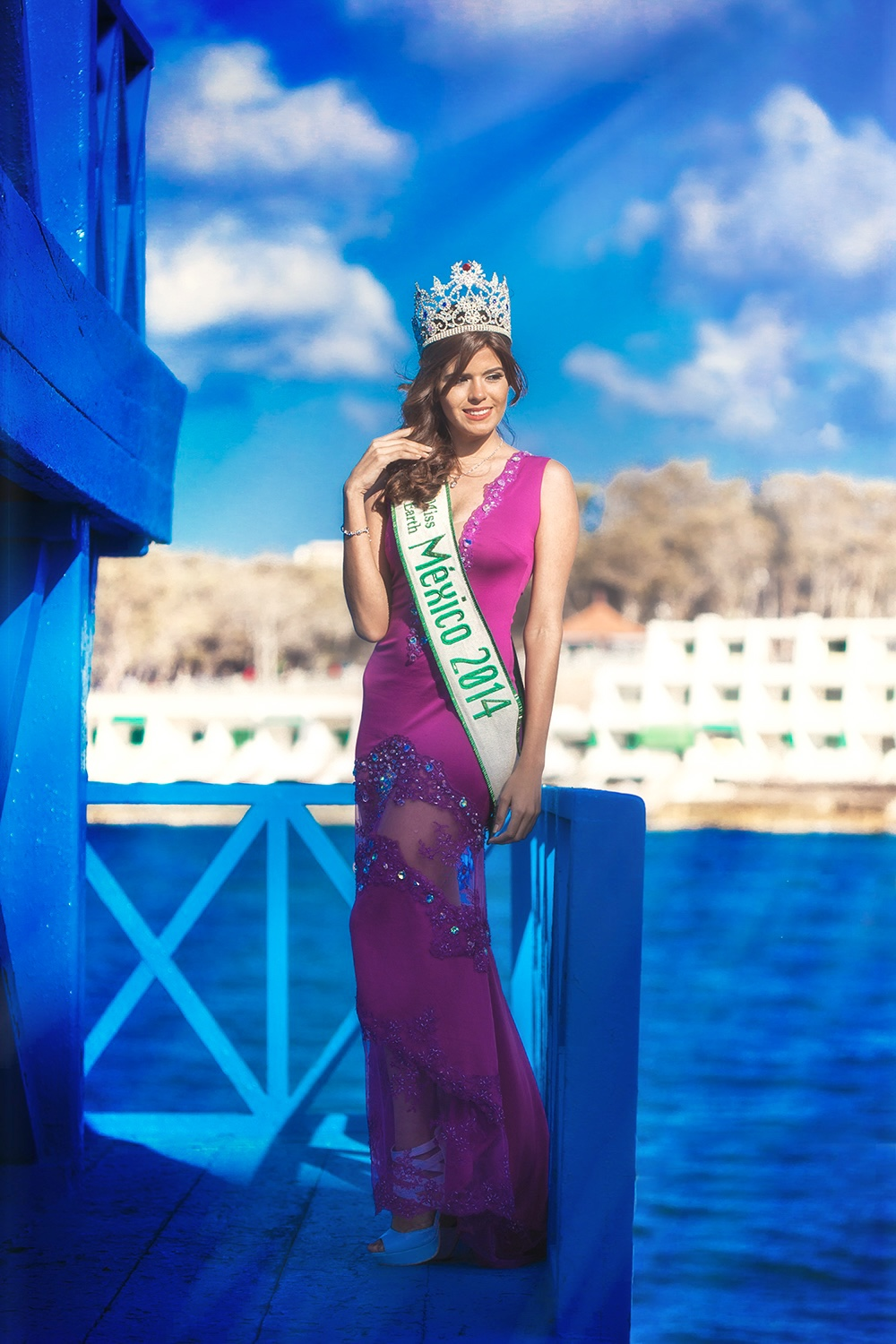
- Yareli Carrillo – Miss Earth México 2014
- Date: September 20, 2014
- Presenters: Carolina Lau; Patricio Cabezut
- Entertainment: Cristian Castro; La Esfinge
- Venue: Salón 53, Culiacán, Sinaloa
- Broadcaster: DISH Network L.L.C.
- Entrants: 32
- Placements: 16
- Winner: Yareli Carrillo; Sinaloa

Miss Earth México 2014 is the 8th edition of the contest Miss Earth México, at Salón 53 in Culiacán, Sinaloa on September 20. Thirty-two contestants from the Mexican Republic will compete for the national title.

At the end of the event, Kristal Silva crowned his successor Yareli Carrillo of Sinaloa as Mister Earth México 2014. Carrillo represented Mexico at Miss Earth 2014 competition held on November in Quezon City, Metro Manila, Philippines, where he finished as the Top 16, marking Mexico's fourth consecutive placement.

== Results ==
=== Placements ===
Final results	Contestant
Miss Earth México 2014	Sinaloa - Yareli Carrillo Salas
Miss Air	Chiapas – Andrea Zenteno
Miss Water	Colima – Marcella Rizzo
Miss Fire	Baja California Sur – Alma Guzmán
Top 8	Nayarit – Mónica Carrillo; Sonora – Karla Serrano; Veracruz – Lidia Arano; Zacatecas – Bertha García
Top 16	Aguascalientes – María José Torrado; Chihuahua – Ana Victoria Fernández; Coahuila – Liliana Rodríguez; Guerrero – Lilibeth Moreno; Michoacán – Cristina Cortes; Puebla – Mervi Pelzer; Querétaro – Ximena Galván; Tabasco – Xiomara Luna

=== Special awards ===
Award	Contestant
Miss Figure	Colima – Marcella Rizzo
Miss Friendship	Sonora – Karla Serrano
Miss Photogenic	Sonora – Karla Serrano
Miss Elegance	Campeche – Ana Laura Sánchez
Miss Internet	Jalisco – Haydee Vizcaíno
Best Evening Gown	Sinaloa – Yareli Carrillo
Best National Costume	Nayarit – Mónica Carrillo
Stylized Costume	San Luis Potosí - Angélica Larrága

== Delegates ==
State	Contestant	Age	Height
Aguascalientes	María José Torrado Rodríguez	23	1.70
Baja California	Adriana Fairuz Assad De la Torre	21	1.68
Baja California Sur	Alma Gloria Guzmán Rito	23	1.76
Campeche	Ana Laura Sánchez Valencia	24	1.68
Chiapas	Andrea Celeste Zenteno Vázquez	19	1.72
Chihuahua	Ana Victoria Fernández Andujo	23	1.75
Coahuila	Liliana Rodríguez Saucedo	23	1.74
Colima	Marcella Rizo García	21	1.80
(Mexico City) Distrito Federal	Andrea Palomares Hernández	21	1.70
Durango	Angelina Galván González	18	1.70
(State of Mexico) Estado de México	Theily Juliana Santos Montiel	22	1.71
Guanajuato	Pamela Gabriela Gasca Cruz	24	1.74
Guerrero	Lilibeth Moreno Loaeza	20	1.73
Hidalgo	Leesly Sarai Zequera	23	1.72
Jalisco	Haydée Vizcaíno Moreno	23	1.74
Michoacán	Cristina Cortés Calderón	18	1.76
Morelos	Sofía Sáenz Vigiola	19	1.72
Nayarit	Mónica Lizbeth Carrillo Coronado	18	1.71
Nuevo León	Sugheidy Yasmín Willie Sauceda	24	1.71
Oaxaca	Karla Méndez Hernández	18	1.70
Puebla	Mervi Alejandra Pelzer Rugerio	21	1.74
Querétaro	Sigal Ximena Galván Friedman	21	1.75
Quintana Roo	Wendy Thalía Nadal Alcocer	19	1.71
San Luis Potosí	Angélica Zeltzin Larraga García	18	1.73
Sinaloa	Yareli Guadalupe Carrillo Salas	22	1.78
Sonora	Karla Edith Serrano Echave	18	1.72
Tabasco	Xiomara Luna Ruiz	21	1.70
Tamaulipas	Rebeca Pérez Amor	21	1.81
Tlaxcala	Ruth Guadalupe Vargas García	23	1.68
Veracruz	Lidia Florencia Arano Herrera	22	1.74
Yucatán	Emma Eugenia Magaña Vallejo	20	1.72
Zacatecas	Bertha Graciela García Dávila	18	1.68
