= Nuestra Belleza Veracruz 2011 =

- Date: July 1, 2011
- Venue: Auditorio Doctor Manuel Suárez, Córdoba, Veracruz
- Broadcaster: Televisa
- Entrants: 6
- Placements: 3
- Winner: Allin Perez; Coatzacoalcoz

Nuestra Belleza Veracruz 2011, was held at the Auditorio Doctor Manuel Suárez of Córdoba, Veracruz on July 1, 2011. At the conclusion of the final night of competition, Allin Perez of coatzacoalcoz was crowned the winner. allin was crowned by outgoing Nuestra Belleza Veracruz titleholder, Diana Botello. Six contestants competed for the state title.

== Results ==
=== Placements ===
Final results	Contestant
Nuestra Belleza Veracruz 2011	Beatriz Adriana Zavaleta
1st Runner-up	Cynthia Grajales
2nd Runner-up	Paola Ramos

== Judges ==
- Miguel Pizarro - Actor
- Juan Soler - Actor
- Socorro Retolaza - Nuestra Belleza Veracruz 1995 & Miss Costa Maya International 1996

== Contestants ==
Hometown	Contestant
Córdoba	Paola Ramos Rodríguez
Boca del Río	Beatriz Adriana Zavaleta Mendoza
Tempoal	Ana Karen Ozuna Zavala
Tuxpan	Elizabeth Salas De la Rosa
Veracruz	Margarita Orozco Hernández
Xalapa	Cynthia Grajales González
