= İlknur Melis Durası =

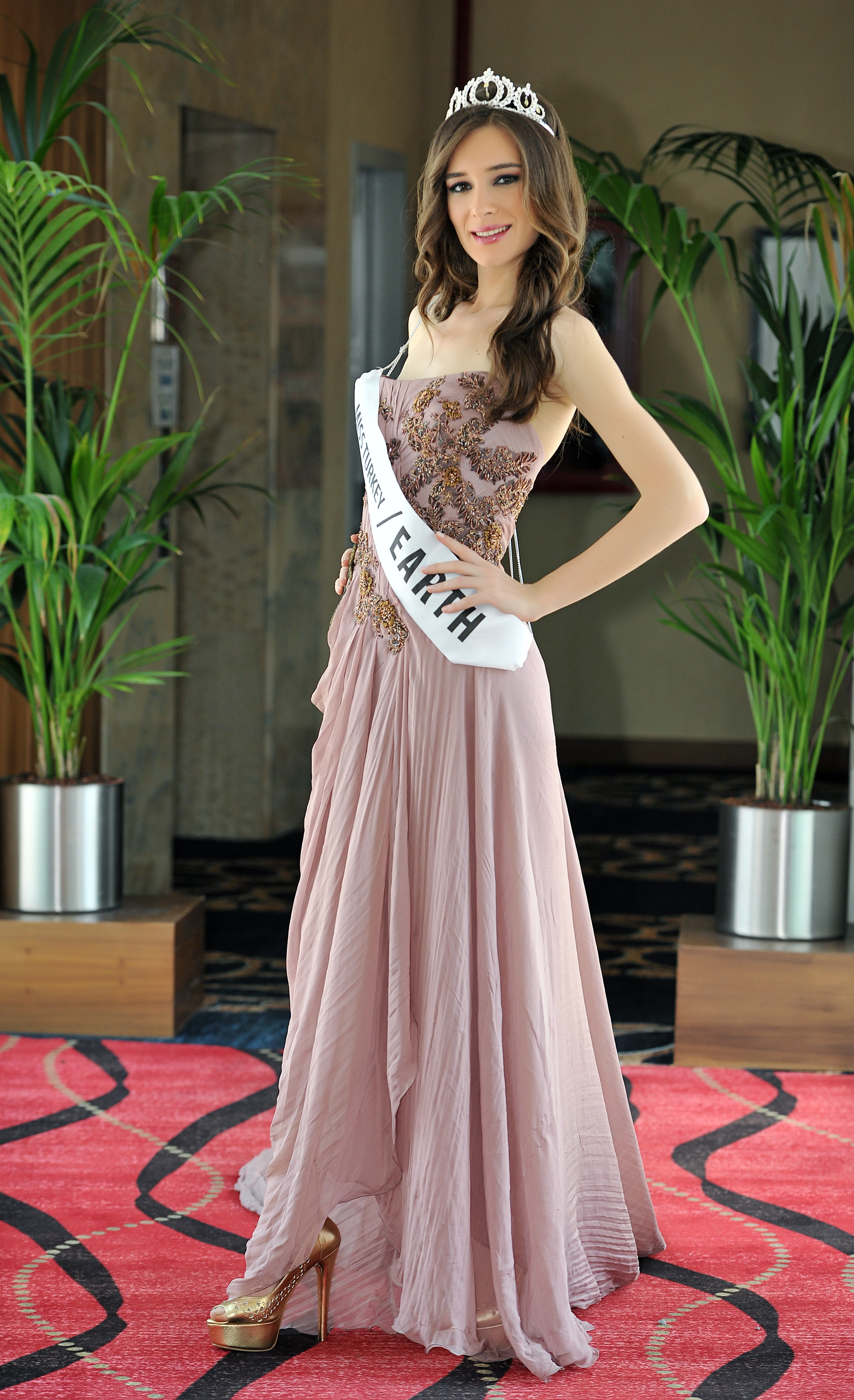
- Melis Durası in 2012
- Born: 10 December 1989 (age 36); Istanbul, Turkey

İlknur Melis Durası (born 10 December 1989) is a Turkish model, bioengineer and beauty pageant titleholder. She was crowned Miss Earth Turkey 2012.

== Personal life ==
Durası was born in Istanbul, Turkey. Both of her parents are mechanical engineers. After graduating as 1st in her class rank from Burak Bora Anatolian High School, she continued her education at Sabancı University in Biological Sciences and Bioengineering Program. She published a conference paper about her studies during undergraduate education. She continues her education as a PhD. student in the same program at Sabancı University.

== Career ==
Durası writes short stories. She speaks four languages and she is an active member of the Adım Adım organization that promotes charity events such as marathons or fund raiser parties.

She ran Nike's Women Marathon as Turkish Peace Ambassador on behalf of children suffering from leukemia in 2011, at San Francisco. She shared her preparatory period and experiences of marathon on social media and networks. The magazine Cosmopolitan carried her effort and success to their pages for consecutive two months. After signing the contract with BG Agency in 2012 she made her first appearance in front of the cameras for a real estate commercial.

She represented her country, Turkey, last November 24, 2012 at Miss Earth 2012 which was hosted by Philippines. Prior to the pageant final, she won numerous medals from the pre-pageant activities making her as the 1st placer in overall tally of medals, but Ilknur was not even in the top 16 semi finalists.,

Awards and achievements
Preceded by Merve Saribas	Miss Earth Turkey; 2012	Succeeded by Ezgi Avcı
