= Symbiosis Institute of Management Studies Pune =

Business school in Pune, India

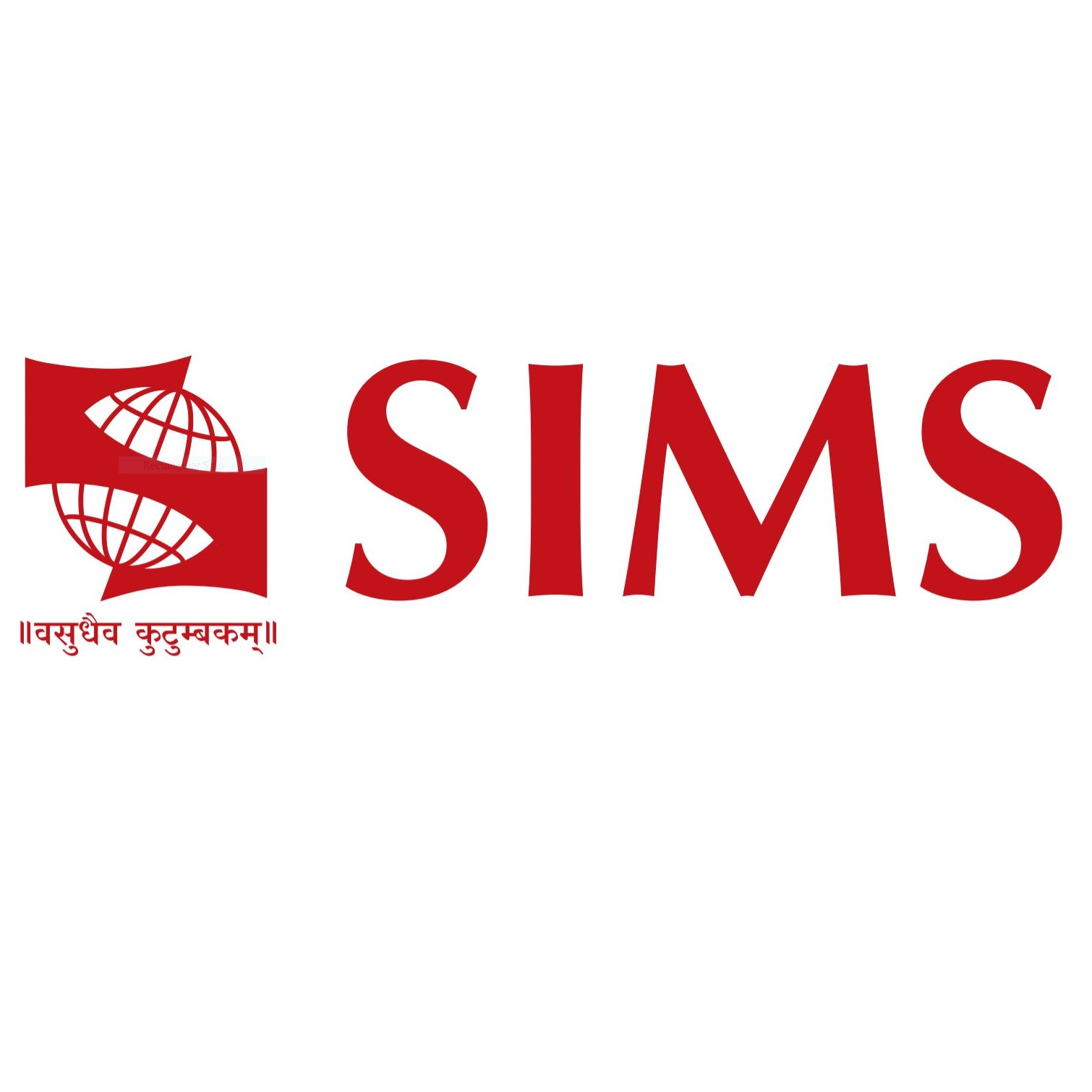
- Motto: Make A Difference
- Type: Private business school
- Established: 8 February 1993
- Accreditation: AICTE
- Academic affiliations: UGC, SIU
- Chancellor: S. B. Mujumdar
- Director: Maj Gen (Dr.) Rohit Bakshi (Retd)
- Location: Pune, India
- Campus: Urban
- Website: www.sims.edu

Symbiosis Institute of Management Studies, Pune, also known as SIMS Pune is a business school located in Pune, India. It is a Constituent of Symbiosis International University; it offers full time MBA and Executive MBA programmes to Indian and international students.

Established in 1993, the institute is an example of PPP (Public Private Partnership) between Symbiosis University and Government of India – Ministry of Defence since 2002. Its flagship MBA course is primarily for Defence Personnel and their Dependents with some seats for Civilian candidates.

Admission to SIMS, Pune is granted on the basis of candidates' performance in SNAP. It is an ISO 9001:2015 quality certified management institute and one of the three institutes in Western India with accreditation of 'Centre for Corporate Governance' of the 'National Foundation of Corporate Governance' (established by Ministry of Corporate Affairs and CII)

SIMS Pune is UGC approved and has been accredited in Grade 'A++' by National Assessment and Accreditation Council (NAAC).

== History ==
SIMS Pune was established in the year 1993 by Shri S. B. Mujumdar. The institute is currently headed by Maj Gen (Dr.) Rohit Bakshi (Retd), who assumed charge as Director in June 2025.

Dr. SB Mujumdar, wanted to serve the defence personnel by working towards reducing the hardships faced by their wards in getting quality education due to their service conditions, and therefore started the Symbiosis Institute of Management Studies, Pune.

Symbiosis Institute of Management Studies (SIMS), Pune, was established on February 8, 1993, initially operating from the modest premises of Symbiosis Pre-Primary School at 15 Prabhat Lane. The institute's first director, Prof. A. Balasubramanian, played a key role in shaping its foundational values and programs. In its early years, SIMS offered two programs: the Management Development Program (MDBA) as a full-time course and an MBA through correspondence.

In the early 2000s, under the guidance of Mr. George Fernandes, the then Defence Minister of India, the government approved a grant of 4 acres of Defence land in Khadki Cantonment to be leased to Symbiosis for the establishment of a dedicated SIMS campus. After 22 months of construction, the new campus was inaugurated, designed by architect Razzak Sheikh.

The academic block, featuring Greek-style architectural columns and a prominent dome over the central foyer, became a landmark of the campus. The campus is efficiently designed, allowing easy access to all areas within a few minutes. It houses a residential community of 600 students with separate four-story hostels for boys and girls, equipped with modern amenities, including a swimming pool, gym, health club, guest rooms, sports facilities, and a mess. The academic block includes faculty offices, classrooms, conference rooms, a seminar hall, a computer lab, a library, and a 400-seat auditorium.

In 2008, SIMS became a constituent of Symbiosis International University (SIU), integrating various Postgraduate Diploma programs into a comprehensive MBA degree, offering specializations in Human Resources, Marketing, Finance, and Operations.

== Institute Rankings ==
SIMS, Pune Rankings
Body/Magazine	Ranking	Year
CSR GHRDC	Top B-School for MBA Executive	2021
CSR GHRDC	2nd Top leading B-School of Super Excellence In India	2021
CSR GHRDC	3rd Top Private B-School in Maharashtra	2021
CSR GHRDC	12th Faculty, Publication, Research, Consultancy, MDP and other programmes in India (Both Government & Private)	2021
CSR GHRDC	12th All over India for Placements, Social Responsibility, Networking and Industry Interface	2021

== List of Directors ==
S. No.	Name	Years served
1	Col. (Dr.) A. Balasubramanian	1993 to 1997
2	Mr. Ranjeet Mudholkar	1997 to 2001
3	Prof. David S. Kadam	2001 to 2003
4	Brig. H. Chukerbuti	2003 to 2009
5	Brig. (Dr.) Rajiv Divekar	2009 to 2025
6	Maj Gen (Dr.) Rohit Bakshi	2025 to present

== Events ==
=== Global Leaders Summit ===
The annual Global Leaders' Summit (GLS), is the flagship corporate event organized by SIMS Pune each year. Running to its 10th edition in the year 2021, the event brings together several reputed industry corporates from across the globe from sectors such as IT/ITES, Manufacturing, Consulting, BFSI, E-Commerce and Media.

=== SIMSARC ===
SIMSARC is the Annual International Research Conference organized by Symbiosis Institute of Management Studies (SIMS), Pune. The conference is aimed at bringing together researchers and scholars to participate, present or publish their research papers. The salient feature of the review process of SIMSARC is its double-blind peer review. The conference has reviewers who are from the industry and academia world of India and abroad.

=== TEDxSIUKirkee 2019 ===
The 4th TEDx event of TEDxSIUKirkee was held at Symbiosis Institute of Management Studies, Pune on 15 December 2019 on the theme 'SURGE (Seek Uniqueness through Redefined Growth and Evolution).

== Notable alumni ==
- Ani Chaudhuri (Serial Entrepreneur and Author of book Pathfinders)
- Arantxa Sanchis (Indian Professional Snooker Player)
- Meghna Khanna (founder of The Bindi Project, appeared on Shark Tank India)
- Mohit Pande (Co-Founder, Linear Squared)
- Nikhil Khurana (Indian Actor)
- Prachi Mishra (Indian Model)
- Rohit Reddy (Founder and CEO of EiPi Media, a digital media and marketing venture focusing on content and tech)
- Rathinh Bhatt (Co-Founder and CEO of Velaro Tiles, scaling manufacturing business models and corporate leadership.)
- Rajeev Kher (Founder, 3s India, India’s premiere portable sanitation brand and SARA PLAST Pvt. Ltd.)
- Sampada Vaze (TV Actress, Model)
- Sujit Jain (Founder, Netsurf)
- Shweta Chauhan (Founder, Smitten)
- Smita Rajgopal Poliak (CEO at kBlock, Co-Founder at Lovelace Academy)
- Sreejith Moolayil (Co-Founder and COO of True Elements, an established health-food and clean-label consumer brand.)
- Sunila Yadav (Founder and Managing Director, Anil Mantra a internation trade and logistics company":0" />
- Sandeep Chaudhary (CEO, PeopleStrong":0" />
- Umesh Wasan (Founder, Nuaav":0" />
