= Miss Earth 2012 =

12th Miss Earth pageant

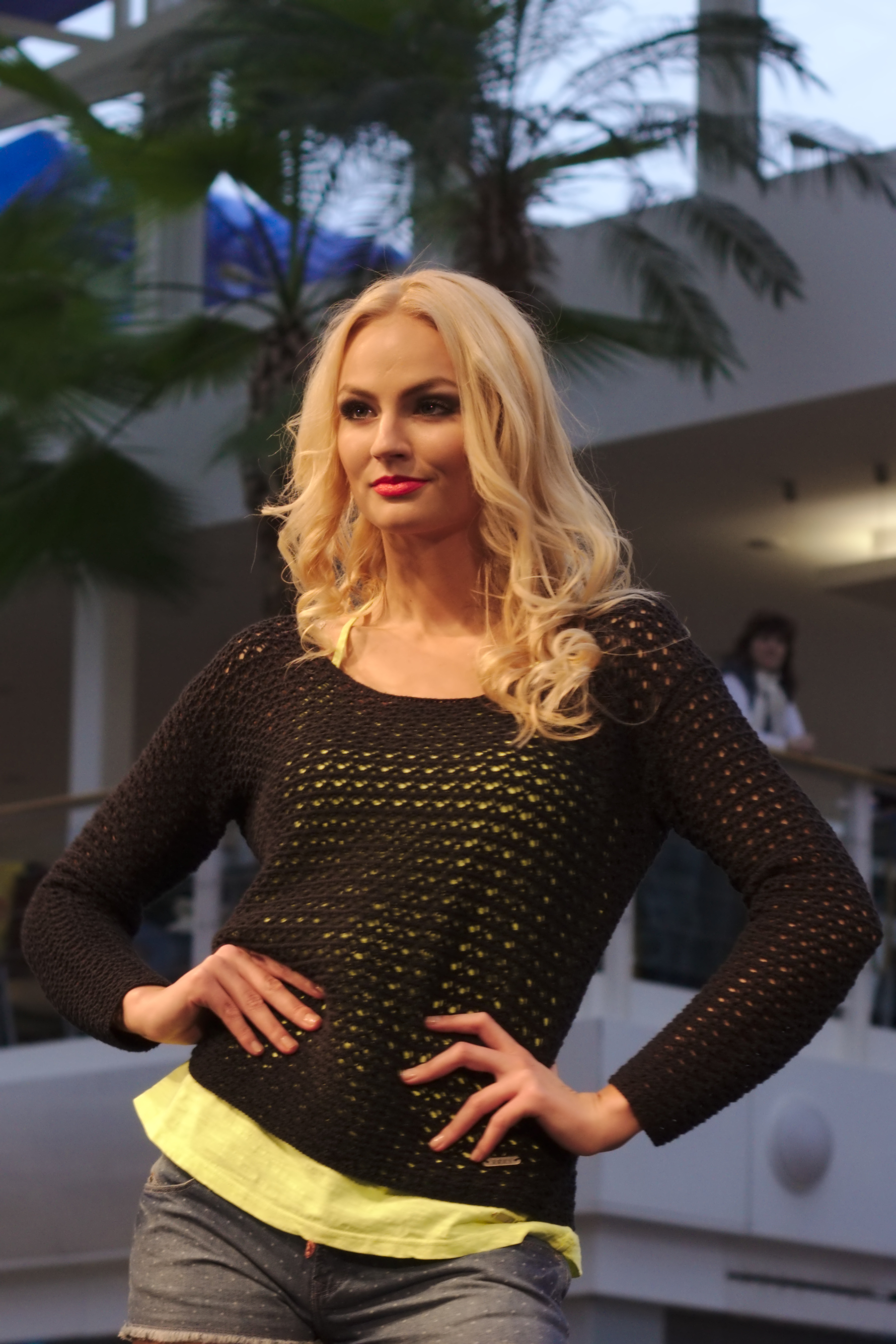
- Tereza Fajksová
- Date: November 24, 2012
- Presenters: Marc S. Nelson; Sandra Seifert; Ginger Conejero
- Theme: International Year of Sustainable Energy for All
- Venue: Versailles Palace, Las Piñas, Philippines
- Broadcaster: ABS-CBN; Star World; Studio 23; The Filipino Channel
- Entrants: 80
- Placements: 16
- Debuts: Cook Islands; Moldova; Réunion
- Withdrawals: Aruba; Chile; Curaçao; Estonia; France; Ghana; Hong Kong; Hungary; Ireland; Israel; Latvia; Luxembourg; Macau; Madagascar; Martinique; Nigeria; Peru; Portugal; Turks and Caicos Islands
- Returns: Argentina; Costa Rica; Fiji; Finland; Kenya; Malta; Mongolia; Nicaragua; Poland; South Sudan; Uruguay
- Winner: Tereza Fajksová; Czech Republic
- Congeniality: Prachi Mishra, India
- Best National Costume: Waratthaya Wongchayaporn, Thailand
- Photogenic: Osmariel Villalobos, Venezuela

Miss Earth 2012 was the 12th edition of the Miss Earth pageant, held at the Versailles Palace in Las Piñas, Metro Manila, Philippines, on November 24, 2012.

Olga Álava of Ecuador crowned Tereza Fajksová of the Czech Republic as her successor at the end of the event.

== Results ==
=== Placements ===
Placement	Contestant
Miss Earth 2012	Czech Republic – Tereza Fajksová
Miss Earth – Air 2012	Philippines – Stephany Stefanowitz
Miss Earth – Water 2012	Venezuela – Osmariel Villalobos
Miss Earth – Fire 2012	Brazil – Camila Brant
Top 8	Nepal – Nagma Shrestha; Russia – Natalia Pereverzeva; South Africa – Tamerin Jardine; United States – Siria Bojorquez
Top 16	Costa Rica – Fabiana Granados; Germany – Nel-Linda Zublewitz; Italy – Giulia Capuani; Japan – Megumi Noda; Mexico – Lourdes Paola Aguilar; Poland – Justyna Rajczyk; Scotland – Sara Pender; South Korea – Sara Kim

=== Special awards ===
Result	Contestant
Darling of the Press	Philippines – Stephany Stefanowitz

=== Challenge Events ===
==== M.E. Trivia Challenge ====
The Trivia Challenge was held on 4 November 2012.

Result	Contestant
Robinsons Place Dasmariñas, Cavite
1st	South Africa – Tamerin Jardine
2nd	United States – Siria Bojorquez
3rd	Philippines – Stephany Stefanowitz
Robinsons Pioneer Forum Edsa, Mandaluyong
1st	Wales – Zoë Kinsella
2nd	Pakistan – Zanib Naveed
3rd	India – Prachi Mishra

==== Walk with M.E. ====
The "Walk with Miss Earth Campaign" was held on the 4, 6, 7 and 8 November 2012.

Result	Contestant
Luneta Park, Manila
1st	South Africa – Tamerin Jardine
2nd	Netherlands – Shauny Bult; Nepal – Nagma Shrestha
3rd	Denmark – Belinda Jensen; United States Virgin Islands – Carolyn Whitney Carter
SM North EDSA, Quezon City
1st	Canada – Valerie Remillard
2nd	Belgium – Madina Hamidi
3rd	Australia – Jenna Seymour
SM Mall of Asia, Pasay
1st	Dominican Republic – Rocio Castellanos
2nd	Spain – Nathalia Moreira
3rd	Russia – Natalia Pereverzeva

==== Liter of Light Project Campaign ====
The "Liter of Light Project Campaign" was held on 6, 8 and 10 November 2012 in San Juan. The project promotes the use of plastic bottles with water as an alternative bulb. The following candidates were hailed as "The Fastest Learners" in making the project.

Result	Contestant
Group 1
1st	Puerto Rico – Darla Pacheco
2nd	New Zealand – Gloria Ofa Blake
3rd	Botswana – Lorraine Ditsebe
Group 3
1st	Germany – Nel-Linda Zublewitz
2nd	Moldova – Aliona Chitoroaga
3rd	Honduras – Odily Alvarenga

==== Environmental Seminar ====
The Environmental Seminar was held on 7 November 2012 at the Bulwagang Ninoy, Ninoy Aquino Parks and Wildlife in Diliman, Quezon City. The following candidates were chosen with the "Best Participation":

Result	Contestant
1st	South Africa – Tamerin Jardine
2nd	United States – Siria Bojorquez
3rd	New Zealand – Gloria Ofa Blake

At the same event, the following candidates were chosen as the "Most Sociable":

Result	Contestant
1st	Guam – Sarah Filush
2nd	Italy – Giulia Capuani
3rd	Singapore – Phoebe Tan

==== M.E. Greenbag Challenge ====
The Miss Earth Greenbag Challenge was held at the Mall of Asia in Pasay, Philippines on 8 November 2012. The activity promotes the use of reusable bags. The following groups of candidates emerged as winners:

Result	Contestant
1st	Australia – Jenna Seymour; Belgium – Madina Hamidi; Belize – Jessel Lauriano
2nd	Austria – Sandra Seidl; Bosnia and Herzegovina – Zerina Sirbegovic; Botswana – Lorraine Ditsebe
3rd	Singapore – Phoebe Tan; Slovak Republic – Martina Grešová; South Africa – Tamerin Jardine

==== Resorts Wear competition ====
The Resorts Wear competition was held on 9, 13 and 17 November 2012.

Result	Contestant
Lingayen, Pangasinan (Group 1)
1st	Puerto Rico – Darla Pacheco
2nd	Czech Republic – Tereza Fajksová
3rd	Mongolia – Battsetseg Turbat
Pontefino Hotel (Group 2)
1st	Venezuela – Osmariel Villalobos
2nd	Turkey – İlknur Melis Durası
3rd	India – Prachi Mishra
Legazpi, Philippines (Group 3)
1st	Germany – Nel-Linda Zublewitz
2nd	Wales – Zoë Kinsella
3rd	Thailand – Waratthaya Wongchayaporn

==== M.E. Eco-Ambassadress ====
The following contestants were chosen as Eco-Ambassadors:

Result	Contestant
Hamilo Coast, Pico de Loro (Group 3)
1st	Germany – Nel-Linda Zublewitz
2nd	South Sudan – Rachael Angeth
3rd	Ukraine – Ievgeniia Prokopenko

==== Miss Earth Official Swimsuit Competition ====
The swimsuit competition" was held on 10 and 14 November 2012. The winners were:

Result	Contestant
Puerto Princesa (Group 1)
1st	Puerto Rico – Darla Pacheco
2nd	Philippines – Stephany Stefanowitz
3rd	South Africa – Tamerin Jardine
Golden Sunset Resort, Calatagan, Batangas (Group 2)
1st	India – Prachi Mishra
2nd	Venezuela – Osmariel Villalobos
3rd	United States – Siria Bojorquez
Northwoods, Bulacan (Group 3)
1st	Paraguay – Alexandra Fretes
2nd	Norway – Nina Fjalestad
3rd	Argentina – Tatiana Bischof

== Controversies ==
Miss Earth Russia, Natalia Pereverzeva, has been heavily criticized for posing topless and for being the cover girl of the Russian Playboy's May 2011 issue (about six months before when she was crowned new Miss Earth Russia 2012). The 24 year old model and former finance specialist, then sporting a blonde hair, appeared to have her hands covering her private parts and did a double breast exposure. Pereverzeva kept mum about the topless photos when asked by media.

She stated, "I don’t think that’s a good question for Miss Earth. Real beauty should be not only natural beauty but the beauty should come from the inside". Her fellow candidates have mixed reactions regarding the issue.

However, the organizers of the Miss Earth contest came to the defense of the Russian beauty, saying Pereverzeva did not violate moral standards.

They also said Pereverzeva's Playboy pictorial was not as daring as the Playboy spread of another European contest who was not allowed to participate in the pageant.

"We cannot enforce our own cultural standards on candidates from other countries. Since Miss Earth is a global endeavor, Miss Russia was chosen through a legitimate official process in her country," Lorraine Schuck, Miss Earth executive vice president, said in a statement.

Barely after a week, Miss Russia made the international headlines once again by provoking an outrage in her motherland by calling it "a beggar" and "my poor long-suffering country, mercilessly torn to pieces by greedy, dishonest, unbelieving people". The source of the outrage came from a response to a standard question about what made her proud of her country and what she could promote about it, asked of all contestants of Miss Earth which has been stated in the pageant's official website.

Pereverzeva began by praising her country, saying it was, "a kind cow with very big eyes, funny horns and always chewing its mouth; oh, what sweet milk she gives!"

But, veering off message, she added: "My Russia is a beggar. My Russia cannot help her elderly and orphans. From it, bleeding, like from a sinking ship, engineers, doctors, teachers are fleeing, because they have nothing to live on. My Russia – it is an endless Caucasian war."

The stinging indictment, published in full on the pageant's website, caused a furore in Russia.

Result	Contestant
Robinsons Starmills, Pampanga (Group 1)
1st	Puerto Rico – Darli Pacheco
2nd	South Africa – Tamerin Jardine
3rd	(Chinese Taipei) Taiwan – Jen-Ling Lu
Enchanted Kingdom, Sta. Rosa, Laguna (Group 2)
1st	Turkey – İlknur Melis Durası
2nd	Guadeloupe – Sherina van der Koelen
3rd	Spain – Nathalia Moreira
Dilinger's Bar, Makati (Group 3)
1st	Malaysia – Deviyah Daranee
2nd	Malta – Yasmin Falzon
3rd	Honduras – Odily Alvarenga

=== M.E. Sponsored Swimsuit Parade ===
The "Miss Earth 2012 Sponsored Swimsuit Parade" was held on 9 November 2012. The winners are:

Result	Contestant
Hamilo Coast, Pico de Loro (Group 3)
1st	Paraguay – Alexandra Fretes
2nd	Norway – Nina Fjalestad
3rd	Dominican Republic – Rocio Castellanos

== Contestants ==
Country/Territory	Contestant	Age	Height	Weight	Hometown	Group
Argentina	Tatiana Bischof	18	5 ft 10 1/2 in (1.79 m)	132 lb (60 kg)	Resistencia	3
Australia	Jenna Seymour	21	5 ft 6 in (1.68 m)	125 lb (57 kg)	Glenmore Park	2
Austria	Sandra Seidl	24	5 ft 7 in (1.70 m)	105 lb (48 kg)	Vienna	1
Bahamas	Brooke Sherman	22	5 ft 7 in (1.70 m)	120 lb (54 kg)	Freeport	2
Belgium	Madina Hamidi	25	5 ft 6 1/2 in (1.69 m)	110 lb (50 kg)	Antwerp	2
Belize	Jessel Lauriano	24	5 ft 7 in (1.70 m)	124 lb (56 kg)	Belize City	2
Bolivia	Dayana Dorado	18	5 ft 9 in (1.75 m)	119 lb (54 kg)	Beni	3
Bosnia and Herzegovina	Zerina Sirbegovic	21	5 ft 6 1/2 in (1.69 m)	114 lb (52 kg)	Srebrenik	1
Botswana	Lorraine Ditsebe	19	5 ft 5 in (1.65 m)	118 lb (54 kg)	Mochudi	1
Brazil	Camila Brant	22	5 ft 9 in (1.75 m)	130 lb (59 kg)	Patos de Minas	1
Canada	Valerie Remillard	24	5 ft 9 in (1.75 m)	107 lb (49 kg)	Saint-Félix-de-Valois	2
China	Jin Rong	25	5 ft 8 in (1.73 m)	114 lb (52 kg)	Beijing	2
Colombia	Cindy Kohn-Cybulkiewicz	25	5 ft 7 in (1.70 m)	125 lb (57 kg)	Maicao	1
Cook Islands	Teuira Napa	19	5 ft 7 1/2 in (1.71 m)	125 lb (57 kg)	Avarua	1
Costa Rica	Fabiana Granados	22	5 ft 7 1/2 in (1.71 m)	114 lb (52 kg)	Hojancha	2
Crimea	Liudmyla Kuzmina	24	5 ft 10 in (1.78 m)	118 lb (54 kg)	Kyiv	1
Czech Republic	Tereza Fajksová	23	5 ft 11 in (1.80 m)	125 lb (57 kg)	Ivančice	1
Denmark	Belinda Jensen	22	5 ft 8 in (1.73 m)	134 lb (61 kg)	Tølløse	1
Dominican Republic	Rocio Castellanos	25	5 ft 9 in (1.75 m)	135 lb (61 kg)	Santiago de los Caballeros	3
Ecuador	Tatiana Torres	25	5 ft 7 in (1.70 m)	120 lb (54 kg)	Cuenca	1
El Salvador	Yaritza Rivera	18	5 ft 9 in (1.75 m)	130 lb (59 kg)	San Vicente	1
England	Zahida Begum	18	5 ft 5 in (1.65 m)	115 lb (52 kg)	Northumberland	1
Fiji	Esther Foss	21	5 ft 10 in (1.78 m)	141 lb (64 kg)	Suva	3
Finland	Kristiina Airi	19	5 ft 7 1/2 in (1.71 m)	118 lb (54 kg)	Helsinki	1
Germany	Nel-Linda Zublewitz	19	5 ft 9 1/2 in (1.77 m)	140 lb (64 kg)	Bünde	3
Guadeloupe	Sherina van der Koelen	19	5 ft 7 1/2 in (1.71 m)	129 lb (59 kg)	Pointe à Pitre	2
Guam	Sarah Filush	24	5 ft 4 in (1.63 m)	113 lb (51 kg)	Piti	2
Guatemala	Stefany Miranda	23	5 ft 7 1/2 in (1.71 m)	115 lb (52 kg)	Guatemala City	3
Honduras	Odily Alvarenga	22	5 ft 5 in (1.65 m)	109 lb (49 kg)	San Pedro Sula	3
India	Prachi Mishra	24	5 ft 8 1/2 in (1.74 m)	110 lb (50 kg)	Uttar Pradesh	2
Indonesia	Chelsy Liven	24	5 ft 9 1/2 in (1.77 m)	132 lb (60 kg)	Tangerang	1
Italy	Giulia Capuani	22	5 ft 10 in (1.78 m)	123 lb (56 kg)	Milan	3
Japan	Megumi Noda	25	5 ft 7 1/2 in (1.71 m)	114 lb (52 kg)	Shiga	1
Kenya	Fiona Konchellah	23	5 ft 9 1/2 in (1.77 m)	123 lb (56 kg)	Nairobi	3
Kosovo	Ajshe Babatinca	18	5 ft 7 in (1.70 m)	121 lb (55 kg)	Pristina	2
Lebanon	Patricia Geagea	21	5 ft 6 in (1.68 m)	125 lb (57 kg)	Beirut	2
Malaysia	Deviyah Daranee	21	5 ft 8 in (1.73 m)	110 lb (50 kg)	Kuala Lumpur	3
Malta	Yasmin Falzon	21	5 ft 7 in (1.70 m)	107 lb (49 kg)	Valletta	3
Mexico	Lourdes Paola Aguilar	20	5 ft 7 in (1.70 m)	114 lb (52 kg)	Yucatan	3
Moldova	Aliona Chitoroaga	24	5 ft 7 1/2 in (1.71 m)	116 lb (53 kg)	Chișinău	3
Mongolia	Battsetseg Turbat	21	5 ft 10 in (1.78 m)	121 lb (55 kg)	Ulaanbaatar	1
Nepal	Nagma Shrestha	21	6 ft 0 in (1.83 m)	132 lb (60 kg)	Kathmandu	2
Netherlands	Shauny Bult	21	5 ft 9 in (1.75 m)	134 lb (61 kg)	Boxtel	2
New Zealand	Gloria Ofa Blake	20	5 ft 8 in (1.73 m)	115 lb (52 kg)	Auckland	1
Nicaragua	Braxis Álvarez	25	5 ft 7 1/2 in (1.71 m)	120 lb (54 kg)	Río San Juan	1
Northern Ireland	Ciara Walker	20	5 ft 7 in (1.70 m)	110 lb (50 kg)	Derry	2
Norway	Nina Fjalestad	19	5 ft 7 1/2 in (1.71 m)	110 lb (50 kg)	Asker	3
Pakistan	Zanib Naveed	25	5 ft 8 in (1.73 m)	113 lb (51 kg)	Lahore	3
Panama	Ana Lorena Ibáñez	26	5 ft 8 1/2 in (1.74 m)	120 lb (54 kg)	Penonomé	2
Paraguay	Alexandra Fretes	24	5 ft 10 in (1.78 m)	132 lb (60 kg)	Asunción	3
Philippines	Stephany Stefanowitz	22	5 ft 9 in (1.75 m)	125 lb (57 kg)	Quezon City	1
Poland	Justyna Rajczyk	20	5 ft 8 in (1.73 m)	110 lb (50 kg)	Poznań	1
Puerto Rico	Darli Pacheco	23	6 ft 1 in (1.85 m)	135 lb (61 kg)	Toa Baja	1
Réunion	Aïsha Valy	22	5 ft 8 1/2 in (1.74 m)	110 lb (50 kg)	Entre-Deux	1
Romania	Iulia Monica Dumitrescu	20	5 ft 6 in (1.68 m)	114 lb (52 kg)	Cluj-Napoca	3
Russia	Natalia Pereverzeva	24	5 ft 7 1/2 in (1.71 m)	110 lb (50 kg)	Kursk	3
Scotland	Sara Pender	22	5 ft 9 in (1.75 m)	133 lb (60 kg)	Lanarkshire	2
Singapore	Phoebe Tan	24	5 ft 8 in (1.73 m)	121 lb (55 kg)	Singapore	1
Slovak Republic	Martina Grešov	26	5 ft 7 1/2 in (1.71 m)	110 lb (50 kg)	Humenné	1
Slovenia	Anjeza Barbatovci	21	5 ft 8 1/2 in (1.74 m)	119 lb (54 kg)	Ljubljana	3
South Africa	Tamerin Jardine	25	5 ft 10 1/2 in (1.79 m)	120 lb (54 kg)	Sandton	1
South Korea	Sara Kim	24	5 ft 9 in (1.75 m)	121 lb (55 kg)	Seoul	2
South Sudan	Rachael Angeth	21	5 ft 7 in (1.70 m)	143 lb (65 kg)	Juba	3
Spain	Nathalia Moreira	20	5 ft 8 in (1.73 m)	121 lb (55 kg)	Madrid	2
Sri Lanka	Chathurika Ariyawansha	25	5 ft 7 in (1.70 m)	99 lb (45 kg)	Colombo	3
Sweden	Camilla Hansson	23	5 ft 7 1/2 in (1.71 m)	117 lb (53 kg)	Stockholm	2
Switzerland	Lea Sara Wittwer	21	5 ft 5 1/2 in (1.66 m)	119 lb (54 kg)	Bern	1
(Chinese Taipei) Taiwan	Lu Jen-Ling	23	5 ft 7 in (1.70 m)	121 lb (55 kg)	Taipei	1
Tanzania	Bahati Chando	20	5 ft 5 in (1.65 m)	110 lb (50 kg)	Dar es Salaam	2
Thailand	Waratthaya Wongchayaporn	19	5 ft 7 1/2 in (1.71 m)	103 lb (47 kg)	Songkhla	3
Trinidad and Tobago	Amryl Nurse	22	5 ft 11 in (1.80 m)	134 lb (61 kg)	Chickland	1
Turkey	İlknur Melis Durası	22	5 ft 11 in (1.80 m)	130 lb (59 kg)	Istanbul	2
Ukraine	Yevhenya Prokopenko	25	5 ft 8 in (1.73 m)	116 lb (53 kg)	Sumy	3
United States	Siria Bojorquez	19	6 ft 0 in (1.83 m)	126 lb (57 kg)	El Paso	2
United States Virgin Islands	Carolyn Whitney Carter	22	5 ft 8 in (1.73 m)	105 lb (48 kg)	Christiansted	2
Uruguay	Cynthia Kutscher	22	5 ft 7 in (1.70 m)	118 lb (54 kg)	Salto	2
Venezuela	Osmariel Villalobos	24	5 ft 8 1/2 in (1.74 m)	118 lb (54 kg)	Maracaibo	2
Vietnam	Đỗ Hoàng Anh	18	5 ft 9 1/2 in (1.77 m)	130 lb (59 kg)	Ha Noi	3
Wales	Zoë Kinsella	20	5 ft 5 in (1.65 m)	110 lb (50 kg)	Cardiff	3
Zimbabwe	Dimitra Markou	18	5 ft 7 1/2 in (1.71 m)	114 lb (52 kg)	Bulawayo	2

== Notes ==
=== Debuts ===
- Cook Islands
- Moldova
- Réunion

=== Returns ===
- Last competed in 2004:
  - Uruguay
- Last competed in 2007:
  - Fiji
- Last competed in 2008:
  - Finland
- Last competed in 2009:
  - Argentina
- Last competed in 2010:
  - Costa Rica
  - Kenya
  - Malta
  - Mongolia
  - Nicaragua
  - Poland
  - South Sudan

=== Replacements ===
- Dominican Republic – Alba Aquino could not compete due to a dispute and was dismissed; replaced by Rocío Castellanos.
- Ecuador – Estefanía Realpe was replaced by Tatiana Torres after the original winner was dethroned.
- Guadeloupe – Feh Rosseau Nyamndi was replaced by Sherina Vanderkoeelen for undisclosed reason.
- Lebanon – Eliane khawand was replaced by Patricia Geagea for undisclosed reason.
- Mongolia – Uyanga Ochirbat was replaced by Battsetseg Turbat for undisclosed reason.
- Spain – Joanna Guianolini was replaced by Nathalia Moreira.
- (Chinese Taipei) Taiwan – Tien-Jung Kuo was replaced by Jen-Ling Lu for undisclosed reason.
