= Yareli Carrillo =

Mexican model and beauty pageant titleholder

Yareli Carillo
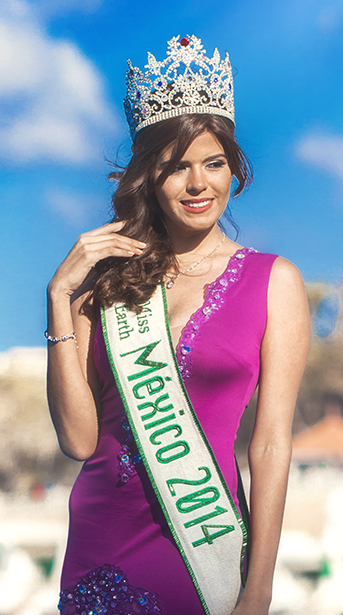
- Carrillo in 2014
- Born: Yareli Guadalupe Carrillo Salas; July 3, 1992 (age 34); Culiacán, Sinaloa, Mexico
- Education: Universidad Autónoma de Occidente (Mexico)
- Height: 1.78 m (5 ft 10 in)

Yareli Guadalupe Carrillo Salas is a Mexican model and beauty pageant titleholder who was crowned Miss Earth México. She became Mexico's representative to Miss Earth 2014 in which she achieved a Top 16 placement.

== Early life and education ==
Carrillo was born on July 3, 1992 in Culiacán, Sinaloa. She started modeling at the age of 14 with Scada New Models by Juan Manuel Alvarado. After completing secondary school, Yareli enrolled at the Universidad Autónoma de Occidente (Mexico), where she graduated in Communication Sciences.

== Pegeantry ==
=== Miss Earth México 2014 ===
Carrillo won the title of Miss Earth México 2014 against 32 delegates during the pageant finale held in the Salón 53, Culiacán, Sinaloa on September 20, 2014. She was crowned by the outgoing titleholder, Kristal Silva of Tamaulipas.

=== Miss Earth 2014 ===
Yareli represented Mexico at Miss Earth 2014 which was held on November 29, 2014, at the UP Theater, University of the Philippines Diliman, Quezon City, Metro Manila, Philippines. 84 delegates from different countries and territories competed for the prestigious and coveted beauty title. At the final coronation show, she achieved a placement in the Top 16.

Awards and achievements
Preceded by Kristal Silva	Miss Earth México; 2014	Next: Gladys Flores Simón
Preceded by Elena Lizárraga Flores	Miss Earth Sinaloa; 2014	Next: Rosaura Ríos Angulo
