= Prachi Mishra =

Indian model (born 1997)

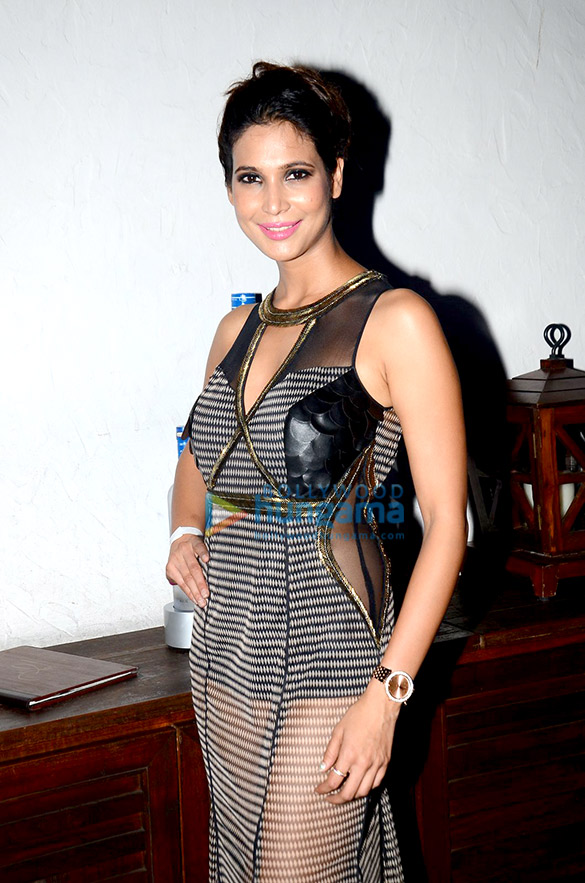
- Mishra grace 'Couture Cabanas' event at Asilo
- Born: 11 February 1988 (age 38); Prayagraj, Uttar Pradesh, India
- Occupations: Model, Actress, Owner, managing director of Shock talent modeling agency.
- Spouse: Mahat Raghavendra (m. 2020)
- Children: 1
- Beauty pageant titleholder
- Title: Femina Miss India Earth 2012
- Major competitions: Femina Miss India Earth 2012; (Winner)

Prachi Misra Raghavendra (née Mishra; born 11 February 1988) is an Indian actress and model. She was crowned Femina Miss India Earth 2012 and represented her country at Miss Earth 2012. She was also crowned Miss Congeniality during the sub-contests for Femina Miss India 2012.

She has appeared in several advertisements before making her Bollywood debut in the 2015 movie Dilliwali Zaalim Girlfriend.

Dilliwali Zaalim Girlfriend https://m.imdb.com/title/tt2800452/

== Early and personal life ==
Prachi was born and brought up in Uttar Pradesh and lived in different cities of India. She completed her Bachelor of Technology in Computer Science from Hindustan College of Science and Technology, Mathura, Uttar Pradesh. She also completed her Post Graduate Diploma in Banking from Symbiosis Institute of Management Studies Pune, Maharashtra.

Prachi started dating Mahat in 2017. The couple got engaged in April 2019 and married on 1 February 2020. Their son Adiyaman Raghavendra was born on 7 June 2021.

== Femina Miss India ==
Mishra entered the Femina Miss India pageant and won the title Femina Miss India Earth. She was also crowned Miss Congeniality during the sub-contests for Femina Miss India 2012. Prachi Mishra also won the Radio Mirchi beauty queen award in Pune 2011.

== Miss Earth 2012 ==
Mishra represented India in Miss Earth 2012 that was held in Manila, Philippines. She won a gold medal for Miss Friendship in Group 1 at Miss Earth 2012 and was crowned Miss Congeniality 2012.

Awards and achievements
Preceded by Hasleen Kaur	Miss Earth India; 2012	Succeeded by Sobhita Dhulipala
