= Madina Hamidi =

Afghan-born Belgian model (born 1987)

- Born: 1987 (age 38–39); Kabul, Afghanistan
- Education: Drama school, jurisprudence, bio-esthetics, reflexology
- Occupations: Actress, singer, writer, psychotraumatologist
- Known for: Pageants, Dutch book 'Van hel tot hemel', side role in Cordon
- Title: Miss Diamond 2011 Belgium
- Website: www.madinahamidi.be

Madina Hamidi (born 1987) is an Afghan-Belgian model and beauty pageant titleholder. She was crowned Miss Diamond 2011 in December 2010, and the Belgian candidate for the Miss Earth 2012.

== Biography ==
When she was 13, she was told her father had moved to Russia. Instead he had been assassinated by the Taliban regime, for his all too progressive convictions according to Taliban standards.

In Afghanistan all female persons have to wear the burqa, only infants are exempt. Her handicapped oldest sister was beaten, for an ankle that was visible for a moment outside in the street.

After her father was killed in Kabul by the Taliban and shortly thereafter her elder brother disappeared, Hamidi fled Afghanistan in 2001 with her mother and sisters. Her mother and her uncle had to pay people traffickers in order to escape to Western Europe.

After many ordeals and travels through Russia, Hamidi arrived in Belgium as a 15-year-old refugee. She and her family were assigned a house in Antwerp. Since she didn't know Dutch, she started in a class for foreign students. After this she started to learn a trade, but thanks to her outstanding scores, she can start studying languages and sciences, resulting in a diploma of bio-esthetics and reflexology.

In 2008 she obtained the Belgian nationality.

== Model career ==
She continued her studies as a beautician, where she comes in contact with the world of fashion. At some point she was asked to replace a model which hadn't shown up. She loved this but her mother didn't so much. She turned down assignments until she was asked to walk a show in Amsterdam. After this she and her mother didn't get along anymore, so she moved out, which wasn't easy. At some point she was near to committing suicide or at least self-mutilation. It took her a while in a psychiatric clinic before it dawned on her she had the key to her salvation in her own hands.

This motivated her to spend all her energy on the Miss Diamond pageant.

In December she was crowned Miss Diamond 2011 after a unanimous decision of the jury, which never happened before in the 29 years this price is being awarded.

In 2012 she wins the Belgian preselection of the Miss Earth pageant and goes to Manila to represent Belgium.

== Acting career ==
In December 2012 she made plans to go to Hollywood to attempt a career as an actress.

In Cannes she played in 'Babaï', and in Belgium a smaller role in 'Cordon'. In the US a longer version of 'Babaï', 'Undercut', for which her boyfriend Abbas Fasaei is the producer, had been issued.

In 2014 she was planning to create a movie from her bookbestseller 'Van hel tot hemel' (in Belgium) which did not materialise as such as yet. Instead of modeling, she's now focusing on writing and acting.

== List of media appearances ==
- 2010
  - Miss Diamant, pageant competition in Antwerp
- 2012
  - Belgian beauty pageant preselection for the Miss World pageant competition
  - Miss World pageant competition in Manila, The Philippines
  - Reyers Laat, TV-interview on VRT
  - Sold Life, a short movie
- 2013
  - Babaï
  - Follow
  - Mujahid
  - Verzuipen
- 2014
  - Cordon
  - Paradox of Nonexistence
- 2015
  - Vossenstreken

== Public activity ==
Putting her personal experiences and insights to help people she founded the 'Centre of Transformation vzw'.

In 2015 she was one of the founding members of the leftist Flemish social political internet forum VLinks.

== Writings ==
=== Book ===
In 2013, Madina wrote a book 'Van hel tot hemel' (From hell to heaven), a tale of all her trials and tribulations.

While visiting the uncle who had helped them flee from Afghanistan, she was courted by a neighbour boy, who seemed very sympathetic. He asked her to marry him, to which she agreed.

==== Plot ====
He was very romantic, putting a rose on her bed every morning. The fairy tale continued, until they returned to Belgium.

He then became very jealous and extremely abusive. He locked her into the bathroom, but she managed to escape.

She called an Iranian friend, Abbas Fasaei, who helped her and who encouraged her to contend in more pageants, and even subscribed her for singing and acting lessons at a drama school.
