= Génesis Vera =

Mexican model and beauty pageant titleholder

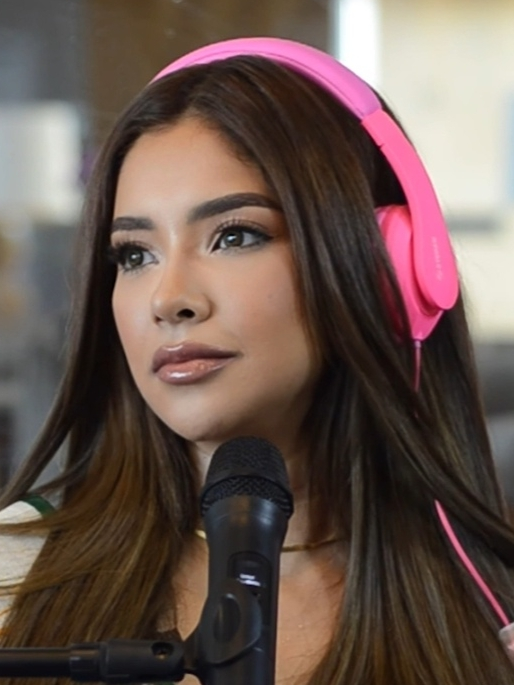
- Vera in 2025
- Born: Génesis Vera Fernández; January 8, 2000 (age 26); Boca del Río, Veracruz, Mexico
- Education: Universidad Cristóbal Colón
- Height: 1.78 m (5 ft 10 in)
- Beauty pageant titleholder
- Title: Miss Earth Veracruz 2025; Miss Earth México 2025; Miss Universe Veracruz 2026
- Hair color: Brown
- Eye color: Brown
- Major competitions: Miss Earth 2025; (Top 12); (People's Choice); Miss Universe Mexico 2026; (3rd Runner-up)

Génesis Vera Fernández is a Mexican model and beauty pageant titleholder who was crowned Miss Earth México. She became Mexico's representative to Miss Earth 2025 in which she achieved a Top 12 placement.

== Pageantry ==
In 2024, Vera received the title of Miss Earth Veracruz, thus gaining the responsibility of representing her state in the Miss Earth Mexico pageant. The following year, she was announced as Miss Earth México 2025 and crowned by National Director Paul Marsell.

Vera flew to the Philippines to be part of Miss Earth in October 20. She competed from various preliminary competition across the Philippines and participated in several environmental activities such as school tours, tree planting, and environmental seminars. Part of the program is to provide an advocacy from each delegate.

Diring the finals night of Miss Earth 2025 pageant, held at the Okada Manila in Parañaque, Metro Manila on November 5, 2025. Vera won the award of "Miss People's Choice". She was also called as one of the Top 12 semifinalists.

Awards and achievements
Preceded by (Poland) Julia Zawistowska	Miss People's Choice; 2025	Succeeded by Incumbent
Preceded by Patricia Lagunes	Miss Earth México; 2025	Succeeded by Alexia Briviesca
