= Miss Veracruz =

Beauty pageant in Veracruz, Mexico

- Formation: 2016
- Type: Beauty pageant
- Headquarters: Veracruz
- Location: Mexico
- Local Coordinator: Suheil Cabrera

Miss Veracruz is a state-level contest in the state of Veracruz, Mexico, which selects the state representative for the national contest Miss México, thus aspiring to represent the country internationally on one of the platforms offered.

The state organization has achieved the following results since 2016:

- 1st Runner-up: 1 (2018)
- Top 5/6: 1 (2016)
- Top 10/11: 2 (2017, 2019)
- Unplaced: 3 (2021, 2023, 2025)

== National Queens ==
- Marilú Acevedo - Reina del Café México 2017 (Designated)

== International Queens ==
- Marilú Acevedo - Reina Internacional del Café 2017

== Titleholders ==
The following are the names of the annual winners of Miss Veracruz, listed in ascending order, as well as their results during the national Miss México pageant. State queens who represented the country in a current or past franchise of the national organization are also highlighted in a specific color.

Current Franchises:

- Competed at Miss World.
- Competed at Miss Supranational.
- Competed at Miss Cosmo.
- Competed at Miss Elite.
- Competed at Top Model of the World.
- Competed at Reina Internacional del Café.
- Competed at Reina Mundial del Banano.
- Competed at Miss Continentes Unidos.
- Competed at Miss Global City.

Former Franchises:

- Competed at Miss Grand International.
- Competed at Miss Costa Maya International.

Year	Titleholder	Hometown	Placement	Special Award	Notes
2026	Daniela Rivera Ladrón de Guevara	Boca del Río	TBD		Top 12 at Teen Universe México 2024; Teen Universe Veracruz 2024
2025	Giselle Monterrosas	Cotaxtla	-	English Challenge	1st Runner-up at Miss Panamerican International 2023; Miss Panamerican USA 2023; Competed at Miss California Teen USA 2016; Miss Hollywood Teen USA 2016; Miss Teen Quiero ser Modelo 2014; First Mexican-american born in Los Angeles, California
2024	In 2024, due to changes in the dates of the national pageant, the election of the state queens was postponed for one year.				
2023	Marlene Coronado (Resigned)	Poza Rica	-	-	Top 16 at Miss México Top Model of the World 2024; Miss Teen Mesoamérica México 2020; Miss Teen Mundial Veracruz 2020
2023	Victoria Isabel Diaz Sánchez (Assumed)	Coatzacoalcos	-	-	3rd Runner-up at Miss México Supranational 2025; 3rd Runner-upa at Miss Veracruz 2021; Competed at Miss Earth Veracruz 2019; 1st Runner-up at Señorita Imagen Porteña 2018
2022	In 2022, due to changes in the dates of the national pageant, the election of the state queens was postponed for one year.				
2021	Diana Karen García Martínez	Poza Rica	-	-	Top 4 at Miss México Elite 2023; Competed at Mexicana Universal Veracruz 2018
2020	In 2020, due to the contingency of COVID-19 there was a lag in the year of the state contest				
2019	Andrea Munguía Olivares	Minatitlán	Top 16	Dances of Mexico	Top 10 at Miss México Elite 2022
2018	Monica Riaño Altrogge (Resigned)	Gutiérrez Zamora	-	-	-
2018	María de Lourdes Acevedo Domínguez (Assumed)	Córdoba	1st Runner-up	-	Miss México Noreste; Reina Internacional del Café 2017; Reina del Café México 2017; Top 5 at Miss México 2016; Miss Veracruz 2016; 1st Runner-up at Nuestra Belleza Veracruz 2012
2017	Alejandra Vargas Lara	Poza Rica	Top 16	-	-
2016	María de Lourdes Acevedo Domínguez	Córdoba	Top 5	-	1st Runner-up at Miss México 2019; Miss Veracruz 2018; Reina Internacional del Café 2017; Reina del Café México 2017; 1st Runner-up at Nuestra Belleza Veracruz 2012

== See also ==
- Miss Universe Veracruz
- Mexicana Universal Veracruz
- Miss Earth Veracruz
