= Natalia Pereverzeva =

Russian model (born 1988)

- Born: 10 November 1988 (age 37); Kursk, RSFSR
- Modeling information
- Height: 1.71 m (5 ft 7 1/2 in)
- Hair color: Blond
- Eye color: Grey green

Natalia Vladimirovna Pereverzeva (Russian: Наталья Владимировна Переверзева, born 10 November 1988, Kursk) is a Russian model. Pereverzeva won the 2010 Miss Moscow and 2011 Krasa Rossii contests. She also participated in the 2012 Miss Earth and 2009 Miss Russia contests. Pereverzeva participated in the photo shoots for Playboy, Cosmopolitan and Harper's Bazaar. She is also engaged in environmentalism, being a member of the Russian WWF.

Pereverzeva gained some particular media interest due to her Miss Earth essay, critical of Russian politics.

== Life ==
Pereverzeva was born to an economist father and an engineer mother. She graduated as a civil service financier. At the age of 17 Pereverzeva was spotted by scouts of a Moscow model agency. At the 2012 Miss Earth contest she was among the eight finalists and received a golden award in the Miss Earth Ever Bilena Make Up Challenge nomination. In September 2013, she began her term as anchor of the program "Style Icon" on Muz-TV.

=== Environmental advocacy ===
Pereverzeva expressed an idea of the reduction of deforestation and the increase of green plantations to protect the ozone layer. She adopted an Amur tiger.

=== Miss Earth essay ===
During the 2012 Miss Earth contest Pereverzeva in her written presentation remarked in particular: "But my Russia is also my poor long, suffering country, mercilessly torn to pieces by greedy, dishonest, unbelieving people. My Russia is a great artery, from which the "chosen" few people are draining away its wealth. My Russia is a beggar. My Russia cannot help her elderly and orphans. From it, bleeding, like from sinking ship, engineers, doctors, teachers are fleeing, because they have nothing to live on. My Russia is an endless Caucasian war". The written presentation was based on an earlier essay by Pereverzeva. In a poll conducted by the Russian newspaper Komsomolskaya Pravda 93% of respondents agreed with Pereverzeva's opinion.
