= Miss Heritage =

Miss Heritage Global
- Formation: 2012; 13 years ago
- Founder: Tare Munzara
- Type: Beauty Pageant
- Headquarters: Johannesburg
- Location: South Africa
- Official language: English
- President: Nhlanhla Shabangu
- Website: Official website

Miss Heritage Global (formerly known as Miss Heritage World) is an international beauty pageant that stands for advancing World Heritage. The pageant was founded in Zimbabwean Country Branding Expert by Tare Munzara. The 6th Miss Heritage Global will be crowned at Kalahari Resort in the Province of Limpopo on the 24th of September 2022

== History ==
Miss Heritage Global Pageant was authored and Created by Tare Munzara who then convinced business partner Co Founder Ronald Tisauke who agreed and worked on the technical side of the pageant event. Tare Munzara conceptualized the concept and vision of the pageant in 2012 during a visit at a World Heritage Site in Zimbabwe (The Victoria Falls) in a hotel room Elephant Hills Hotel. He further developed the concept over time in his Bedroom which he used as his working space. Miss Heritage pageant was founded on the basis to incorporate all nations, all religions and all people from different backgrounds to be involved in the process of initiating positive change the world through the use of world heritage. Its name was rebranded twice, from Miss Heritage World to Miss Heritage, and then to Miss Heritage Global, of which the first instance was due to legal issues by Julia Morley of Miss World, and then the second time it was when Tare Munzara who was President at that time, left the pageant.

== Titleholders ==
Year	Country	Miss Heritage	National Title	Location	Entrants
2022	Haiti	Abigail Pierre-Louis	Miss Heritage Haiti	Thohoyandou, Limpopo, South Africa	32
2019	Latvia	Alisa Miskovska	Miss Heritage Latvia	Accra, Ghana	55
2016	France	Théodora Marais	Miss Heritage France	Johannesburg, South Africa	21
2015	South Africa	Ziphozinhle Ntlanganiso	Miss Heritage South Africa	Johannesburg, South Africa	32
2014	Philippines	Odessa Mae Tadaya	Miss Heritage Philippines	Johannesburg, South Africa	28
2013	Bahamas	Shequera Grace Kin	Miss Heritage Bahamas	Harare, Zimbabwe	22

=== Runners-up ===
Year	1st Runner-up	2nd Runner-up	3rd Runner-up	4th Runner-up
2022	Zimbabwe; Eva Mzondiwa	South Africa; Zabelo Hlabisa	Not awarded	Not awarded
2019	Ghana; Eugenia Abotsi	Uganda; Emily Ayen	Not awarded	Not awarded
2016	Costa Rica; Andrea Castro	Botswana; Oweditse Gofaone Phirinyane	South Africa; Sherianne Pillay	Gabon; Unknown
2015	Philippines; Daziella Gange	India; Pooja Bimrah	Rwanda; Joanna Keza Bagwire	Belgium; Vicky Vanhaeke
2014	Saint Vincent and the Grenadines; Anna La Borde	Botswana; Katlego Gaotsenelelwe	South Africa; Kgomotso Caroline Angel Pilane	Australia; Jennifer Hunt
2013	India; Swati Kain	Russia; Natalia Poluektora	Italy; Francesca Ena	Ecuador; Tatiana Torres

=== Continental Queens of Beauty ===
Year	Africa	Asia	Europe	South America	North America
2016	Senegal	Thailand	Italy	Not awarded	Mexico
2015	Rwanda	Turkmenistan	Azerbaijan	Not awarded	Not awarded
2014	Ghana; Zina Asiedu	India; Avneet Kaur Arora	Belgium; Jennifer Den Haese	Ecuador; Maria Jose Otavalo	Mexico; Andrea Zenteno

== See also ==
- List of beauty contests
