= Mexicana Universal Veracruz =

Beauty contest

- Formation: 1994 (as Nuestra Belleza Veracruz); 2017 (as Mexicana Universal Veracruz)
- Type: Beauty Pageant
- Headquarters: Veracruz
- Location: Mexico
- Local Coordinator: Estefanía Ruiz

Mexicana Universal Veracruz (until 2016 called Nuestra Belleza Veracruz) is a state-level contest in the state of Veracruz, Mexico, which selects the state representative for the national contest Mexicana Universal (formerly called Nuestra Belleza México), thus aspiring to represent the country internationally on one of the platforms offered.

The state organization has achieved the following results since 1994:

- Winner: 1 (2012)
- 1st Runner-up: 1 (1996)
- Top 10/11/12: 6 (2002, 2004, 2005, 2013, 2017, 2025)
- Top 15/16: 5 (1995, 2007, 2010, 2015, 2019)
- Top 20/21: 3 (2000, 2001, 2018)
- Unplaced: 13 (1994, 1997, 1998, 1999, 2003, 2006, 2008, 2009, 2011, 2014, 2016, 2021, 2022)
- Absences: 1 (2023)

== National Queens ==
- Marilyn Chagoya - Nuestra Belleza Mundo México 2012
- Socorro Retolaza - Miss Costa Maya México 1996 (Designated)

== International Queens ==
- Socorro Retolaza - Miss Costa Maya International 1996

== Titleholders ==
The following are the names of the annual winners of Mexicana Universal Veracruz, listed in ascending order, as well as their results during the national Mexicana Universal pageant. State queens who represented the country in a current or past franchise of the national organization are also highlighted in a specific color.

Current Franchises:

- Competed at Miss Grand International.
- Competed at Miss International.
- Competed at Miss Charm.
- Competed at Reina Hispanoamericana.
- Competed at Miss Orb International.
- Competed at Nuestra Latinoamericana Universal.

Former Franchises:

- Competed at Miss Universe.
- Competed at Miss World.
- Competed at Miss Continente Americano.
- Competed at Miss Costa Maya International.
- Competed at Miss Atlántico Internacional.
- Competed at Miss Verano Viña del Mar.
- Competed at Reina Internacional del Café.
- Competed at Reina Internacional de las Flores.
- Competed at Señorita Continente Americano.
- Competed at Nuestra Belleza Internacional.

Year	Titleholder	Hometown	Placement	Special Award	Notes
2025	Adriana Lizeth Bautista Reyes	Misantla	Top 12	-	Reina del Carnaval de Misantla 2026; Top 10 at The Miss Globe 2025; The Miss Globe México 2025; Miss Earth Veracruz 2025; 2nd Runner-up at Miss Intercontinental México 2024; Miss Intercontinental Veracruz 2024; Competed at Miss Veracruz 2022
2024	In 2024, due to changes in the dates of the national pageant, the election of the state queens was postponed for one year.				
2023	Leticia Sabik Salazar Molar; Withdrew from the national competition due to the postponement of the national pageant.	Tuxpan	Did not Compete	-	1st Runner-up at Reina Turismo México 2017; Reina Turismo Veracruz 2017; Reina del Carnaval de Tuxpan 2017; Señorita Tuxpan 2016
2022	Francis Barradas Aguilar	Alto Lucero	-	-	Reina Fiestas Patronales Alto Lucero 2022; Competed at Mexicana Universal Veracruz 2017; Competed at Miss Earth Veracruz 2017; Miss Earth Alto Lucero 2017
2021	Samantha Margarita del Ángel Herrera	Xalapa	-	-	Miss Mesoamérica International 2019; Miss Mesoamérica México 2019
2020	In 2020, due to the contingency of COVID-19 there was a lag in the year of the state contest				
2019	Estefanía Ruíz Iñiguez	Úrsulo Galván	Top 16	-	Competed at Miss Model of the World México 2019; Miss Model of the World Veracruz 2019; Competed at Nuestra Belleza México 2017; Nuestra Belleza Veracruz 2016; Nuestra Belleza Úrsulo Galván 2016; Competed at Nuestra Belleza Veracruz 2012; Nuestra Belleza Úrsulo Galván 2012
2018	Miriam Alejandra Carballo Gallardo	Boca del Río	Top 20	-	Miss Intercontinental Veracruz 2017; Competed at Nuestra Belleza Veracruz 2015
2017	Martha Leticia Suárez Briano	Boca del Río	Top 10	-	Top 10 at Universal Woman 2022; Universal Woman México 2022; Mexicana Universal Boca del Río 2017; Competed at Miss Intercontinental 2016; Miss Intercontinental México 2016; Miss Earth México-Water 2015; Miss Earth Veracruz 2015; Miss Earth Boca del Río 2015; 3rd Runner-up at Nuestra Belleza Veracruz 2013; Nuestra Belleza Boca del Río 2013
Until 2016 the Title was Nuestra Belleza Veracruz
2016	Estefanía Ruíz Iñiguez	Úrsulo Galván	-	-	Top 16 at Mexicana Universal 2020; Mexicana Universal Veracruz 2019; Competed at Miss Model of the World México 2019; Miss Model of the World Veracruz 2019; Nuestra Belleza Úrsulo Galván 2016; Competed at Nuestra Belleza Veracruz 2012; Nuestra Belleza Úrsulo Galván 2012
2015	Arely Betsabé Espinoza Jiménez	Poza Rica	Top 15	-	Nuestra Belleza Poza Rica 2015
2014	Zara Lorena Ichante Sosa	Poza Rica	-	-	Nuestra Belleza Poza Rica 2014
2013	Blanca Lidia Lima Quiroz	Poza Rica	-	-	Nuestra Belleza Poza Rica 2013
2012	María Elena Chagoya Triana	Poza Rica	Nuestra Belleza Mundo México	Academic Award	Competed at Miss World 2013; Nuestra Belleza Poza Rica 2012
2011	Beatriz Adriana Zavaleta Mendoza	Boca del Río	-	-	Competed at Señorita Turismo y Cultura Veracruz 2007
2010	Diana Estefanía Botello Meza	Boca del Río	Top 15	-	Señorita Turismo y Cultura Veracruz 2008
2009	Fabiola Pinal Montesinos	Córdoba	-	-	-
2008	Fabiola Anitúa Valdovinos	Veracruz	-	-	-
2007	Paloma García-Ferro Lajud	Xalapa	Top 15	-	-
2006	Magdalena Tavizón Barraza	Veracruz	-	-	-
2005	Cindy Cajuste Sequeira	Poza Rica	Top 10	-	1st Runner-up at Miss Costa Maya International 2006; Miss Costa Maya México 2006
2004	Melina Rivera Robert	Veracruz	Top 10	Miss Photogenic	-
2003	Ana Paola Pantoja Pola	Veracruz	-	-	-
2002	Kasteny de la Vega Vázquez	Poza Rica	Top 12	-	Queen of the Year International 1997; Señorita Turismo México 1997; 2nd Runner-up at Señorita México 1996; Señorita Veracruz 1996
2001	María Andrea Macías Azuara	Tempoal	-	-	Reina del Carnaval de Veracruz 2007
2000	Emily Beer Ricco	Coatzacoalcos	Top 20	-	Top 20 at Nuestra Belleza Mundo México 2000
1999	Karla Delgado Hernández	Veracruz	-	-	-
1998	Maribel Rodríguez Gasca	Cordoba	-	-	-
1997	Erika Beatriz Pérez Pérez	Veracruz	-	-	-
1996	Ileana Fomperosa Chavarin	Córdoba	1st Runner-up	-	1st Runner-up at Nuestra Belleza Mundo México 1996
1995	María del Socorro Retolaza Ulloa	Veracruz	Top 16	Best Hair	Miss Costa Maya International 1996; Miss Costa Maya México 1996
1994	Paola Kersti Hartley	Xalapa	-	-	-

== Designated Contestants ==
Starting in 2000, states were allowed to have more than one candidate, as some states were not sending candidates for various reasons. The following contestants from Veracruz were invited to compete in the national pageant alongside the reigning queen, and in some cases, they achieved even better results.

Year	Titleholder	Hometown	Placement	Special Award	Notes
2013	Luz Estefanía Cobos Rivera	Poza Rica	Top 10	-	Diosa Maya Internacional 2014; Reina del Café México 2014
2001	Adriana Loya Páez	Veracruz	Top 20	-	Top 21 at Nuestra Belleza Mundo México 2001; Runner-up at Nuestra Belleza Veracruz 2001; Señorita México 1998; Señorita Veracruz 1998
2001	Arumi Esmeralda Vargas Andrade	Poza Rica	-	-	Runner-up at Nuestra Belleza Veracruz 2001
2001	Andrea Pérez Verdera	Xalapa	Top 20	-	Top 21 at Nuestra Belleza Mundo México 2001; Runner-up at Nuestra Belleza Veracruz 2001
2001	Valeria Loya Herrera	Tuxpan	-	-	Runner-up at Nuestra Belleza Veracruz 2001
2000	Luz Amelia Bulnes Talavera	Córdoba	-	-	1st Runner-up at Nuestra Belleza Veracruz 2000

== See also ==
- Miss Universe Veracruz
- Miss Veracruz
- Miss Earth Veracruz
