= Miss Heritage 2014 =

- Date: December 20, 2014
- Entrants: 42
- Placements: 8
- Debuts: Algeria; Angola; Bangladesh; Belarus; Belgium; Benin; Brazil; Bulgaria; Canada; Ethiopia; Egypt; Guadeloupe; Haiti; Indonesia; Ivory Coast; Kenya; Mauritius; Morocco; Myanmar; New Zealand; Paraguay, Philippines; Portugal; Rwanda; Spain; Swaziland; Thailand; Uganda; United States
- Withdrawals: Pakistan
- Winner: Odessa Mae Tadaya; Philippines

Miss Heritage 2014 was the second Miss Heritage pageant, held in Johannesburg, South Africa, on December 20, 2014.

Shequera Grace King of The Bahamas crowned Odessa Mae Tadaya of the Philippines at the end of the event.

== Results ==
=== Placements ===
Placement	Contestant
Miss Heritage 2014	Philippines – Odessa Mae Tadaya
1st Runner-Up	Saint Vincent – Anna La Borde
2nd Runner-Up	Botswana – Katlego Gaotsenelelwe
3rd Runner-Up	South Africa – Kgomotso Pilane
4th Runner-Up	Australia – Jennifer Hunt
Top 8	Ghana – Zina Asiedu; India – Avneet Kaur Arora; Mexico – Andrea Zenteno

=== Continental Queens ===
Continent	Contestant
Miss Heritage Africa	Ghana – Zina Asiedu
Miss Heritage Asia	India – Avneet Kaur Arora
Miss Heritage Europe	Belgium – Jennifer Den Haese
Miss Heritage North America	Mexico – Andrea Zenteno
Miss Heritage South America	Ecuador – Maria Jose Otavalo

== Contestants ==
Country	Contestant	Age	Hometown
Algeria	Nassima Marwa Aid	23	Algeria
Argentina	Sofia Pomo	21	Argentina
Australia	Jennifer Hunt	25	New South Wales
Bangladesh	Fatimatu Zohra Etisha	20	Dhaka
Belize	Jessel Lauriano	26	Belize
Belgium	Jennifer Den Haese		Belgium
Botswana	Katlego Gaotsenelelwe	20	Gaborone
Belarus	Iana Fedoseeva	20	Tula
Cameroon	Florence Épée Ngasse	21	Yaounde
Canary Islands	Mishela Batista	27	Canary Islands
Crimea	Skrylkova Ekaterina	20	Tula
Ecuador	Maria Jose Otavalo Quizhpe	18	Cuenca
Ethiopia	Genet Tsegay	23	Addis Ababa
Ghana	Zina Asiedu	26	Accra
Guadeloupe	Anaïs Modeste	18	Trois-Rivières
Iceland	Unnur Zodiak	18	Reykjavík
India	Avneet Kaur Arora	19	New Delhi
Indonesia	Rakhmi Wijiharti	21	Semarang
Italy	Olga Matsyana	24	Rome
Ivory Coast	Reine Victoire Aka	21	Abidjan
Kyrgyzstan	Rannat Aitalieva	25	Kyrgyzstan
Lebanon	Mirna Olleik	28	Beirut
Mauritius	Dona Charun	21	Port Louis
Mexico	Andrea Zenteno		Chiapas
Morocco	Saloua Bouchaib	28	Marrakesh
Namibia	Magdelena Weef Geaorge	20	Windhoek
New Zealand	Paige Thiyagarajah	21	Auckland
Netherlands	Joyce Jansen		Netherlands
Nigeria	Kehinde Mojisola	22	Lagos
Poland	Natalia Janoszek	24	Bielsko-Biała
Portugal	Raquel Fonte	22	Lisbon
Philippines	Odessa Mae Tadaya	18	Guimba
Romania	Burca Monica	27	Bucharest
Russia	Kristina Kuzovnikova	20	Tula
Rwanda	Marlene Mutoniwase	22	Kigali
Spain	Laura Illanas	21	Spain
Saint Vincent and the Grenadines	Anna La Borde	25	Kingstown
South Africa	Kgomotso Caroline Angel Pilane		
Swaziland	Phumzile Thwala	23	Mbabane
United States	Michelle Cooper	20	San Diego
Uganda	Aiysha Nagudi	26	Kampala
Vietnam	Pearlynn Dang	18	California
Zambia	Tina Shinga	22	Lusaka
Zimbabwe	Tendai Rukwava	25	Harare

=== Crowned Queens at national pageants ===
Miss Heritage Rwanda, Marlene Mutoniwase was crowned on 20 February at the Miss Rwanda Pageant .

Miss Heritage Swaziland, Phumzile Thwala was crowned in September 2013.

Miss Heritage Philippines, Odessa Mae Tadaya was crowned as the official delegate for Philippines for Miss Heritage 2014.

Miss Heritage India, Avneet Kaur Arora was crowned as the official delegate of India for Miss Heritage 2014.

== Heritage Championship events ==
=== Ludo-diversity Queen ===
Ludo Diversity means diversity in games, of all sorts, physical and non physical. Contestants engage into traditional games, from different countries. Traditional games are part of intangible heritage and a symbol of the cultural diversity in the world. They are medium to project and show the great values of solidarity, diversity, inclusiveness and cultural awareness.

Game 1- Iintonga is a South African ancient Indigenous Game.

This game is an ancient game that has been practiced for many centuries in South Africa Two fighters go into a ring. Each contestant will be having two plastic form rubber sticks, the attack and the defense stick. The referee blows a whistle to start the game and the fighters try to hit their opponent with their stick, while defending themselves with the defense stick. Points are given due to number of blows that hit the fighter's body. A referee controls the match and a timekeeper controls the rounds in each bout. A bout consists of three rounds of one minute each.

Result	Contestant
Winner	Rwanda – Marlene Mutoniwase
1st runner-up	Ecuador – Maria José Otavalo
2nd runner-up	India – Avneet Kaur Arora

=== Heritage Cuisine Queen ===
This competition is a Gift performance show, i.e. Talent in layman's terms. It is based on gifts/talents that are Traditional, Heritage themed depending per country. So each contestant shows off her country's culture through the heritage performance. Contestants shall also be put into two groups’ whereby they are required to produce a 5-minute Drama /Play per group which Portrays World Heritage related Issues.

Winner

- Netherlands - Joyce Jansen

1st runner up

- India -Avneet Kaur Arora

2nd runner up

- Australia -Jennifer Hunt
