= Abigail Elizalde =

Mexican model and beauty pageant titleholder

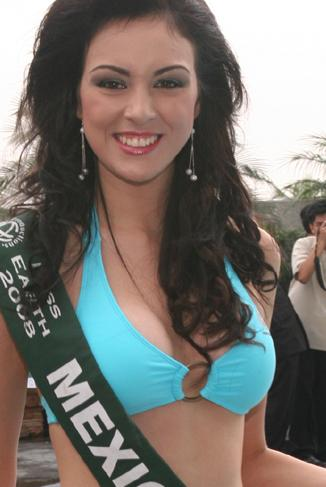
- Born: Abigail Elizalde Romo; Torreón, Coahuila, Mexico
- Height: 1.83 m (6 ft 0 in)
- Beauty pageant titleholder
- Title: Miss Earth México 2008; Miss Earth Water 2008
- Hair color: Black
- Eye color: Brown

Abigail Elizalde Romo (born 1985) is a Mexican model and beauty pageant titleholder who won the Miss Earth Mexico and was the second runner-up Miss Water in the 2008 Miss Earth competition.

== Early life ==
Abigail was born in Coahuila, Torreón; While growing up, she became aware of environmental issues through her Ecology class. Now at 23, Elizalde's profession is electronic system engineering and is concerned with the protection of the environment.

== Pageantry ==
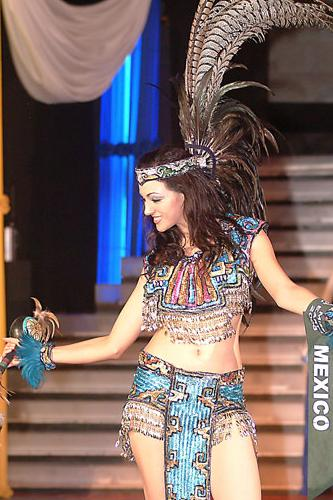
Abigail Elizalde showcasing her country's national costume during Miss Earth 2008 pageantry

Elizalde was crowned Miss Earth México 2008.

In the final competition of the eighth edition of the international beauty pageant Miss Earth, Elizalde was announced as one of sixteen semi-finalists who would move forward to compete for the title. She achieved one of the eight highest scores in the swimsuit competition for her stage chops, which advanced her as one of the top eight finalists to participate in the evening gown competition. She then pulled away for the lead as she articulated in her video interview about environmental concerns as a key issue in her country, in which she advanced to the top four.

In the last round, the court of four were asked one question, “What would you tell US president-elect Barack Obama about the state of the global environment if ever you were to meet him?” She placed the third highest score in the interview round and at the conclusion of the competition, she was crowned Miss Earth Water. She finished as second runner-up or Miss Water 2008 to the eventual winner, Miss Philippines, Karla Henry. Elizalde was the first Mexican beauty queen to place in Miss Earth. The Miss Earth pageant was held on November 9, 2008 at the Clark Expo Amphitheater in Angeles, Pampanga, Philippines. Eighty-five delegates arrived from October 19, 2008 in the Philippines. The pageant was broadcast live via ABS-CBN in the Philippines and to many countries worldwide via Star World, The Filipino Channel and other partner networks.

Awards and achievements
Preceded by (Venezuela) Silvana Santaella	Miss Earth-Water; 2008	Next: (Venezuela) Jessica Barboza
Preceded by (Venezuela) Silvana Santaella	Best in Swimsuit; 2008	Next: (Philippines) Sandra Seifert
Preceded by (Tamaulipas) Fernanda Cánovas	Miss Earth México; 2008	Next: (Jalisco) Natalia Quiñones
