= Tare Munzara =

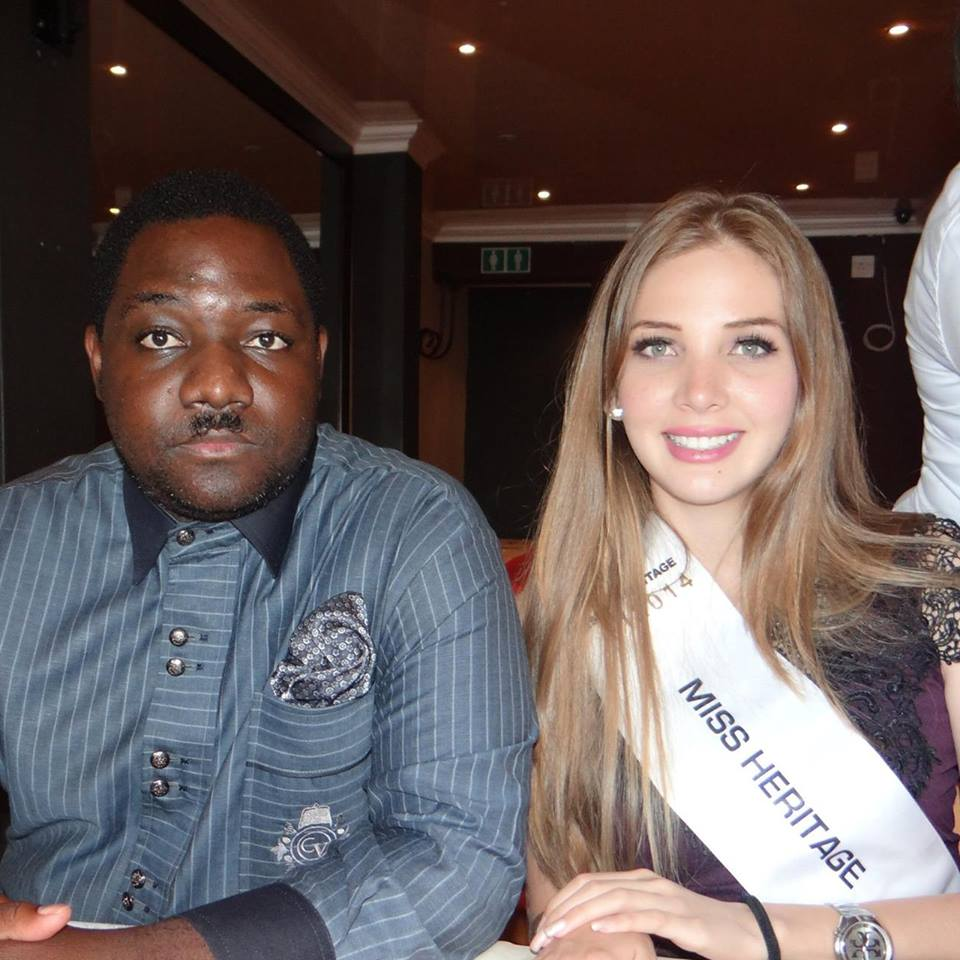
- Pronunciation: Taare
- Born: Mutare, Zimbabwe
- Education: LLB Law Oxford Brookes University
- Occupations: Entrepreneur, Speaker & Nation Branding Expert
- Years active: 2011-Present
- Notable work: Founder Miss Heritage Global
- Board member of: Zimbabwe Tourism Authority
- Awards: Voice of Achievers Awards :Best Cultural Promotion in Africa 2015; Top 100 Most influential Zimbabweans Under 40 years Old. 2021; Ranked 20th Most influential Zimbabean under 40 years old. 2022
- Website: www.taremunzara.co.zw

Tare Munzara, born March 18, 1989, is an international entrepreneur, motivational writer, speaker & expert on country and nation branding serving as the Founder & Group Chief Executive for Destination Marketing International a Global Firm that works with world Governments. He currently seats in the government board of Directors for Zimbabwe Tourism Authority where he was appointed by The Minister of Tourism and Hospitality Industry..He is also the Founder and Former President for the world renowned international beauty pageant, Miss Heritage which is a global brand franchised in over 75 countries. in 2016 he was listed as one of the Top 100 most influential and powerful youths of Zimbabwe. In 2021 again was named number 48 on the most influential young Zimbabweans under 40 years old. On the 10th Anniversary of the Top 100 Most influential list 2022 he was once again named and ranked as number 20 most influential person in Zimbabwe under 40 years old.

== Biography ==
Studied a Law Degree at KDU College Malaysia doing a twinning program with Oxford Brookes University in 2009 but before that during his sixth form he was an Honorable Junior Councilor for Harare City Junior Council. Later established a modelling agency in 2011 and then ventured into international pageantry where he created the International Beauty Pageant Miss Heritage, which he used as a tool for Nation Branding, Destination Marketing and Tourism Marketing. Miss Heritage became a resounding success after it struggled during its first launch in 2013 but he managed to make it one of the world's biggest events and franchise. In 2018 he then went into strictly specializing in Country Branding and Nation Branding and Promotion through a company he founded called Destination Marketing International In 2022 He was appointed in to the Government of Zimbabwe as a board member at the Zimbabwe Tourism Authority.

== International Modelling Business Career ==
February 2012, he Authored and founded the world renowned international pageant called Miss Heritage Global during a visit at a world heritage site, Victoria Falls. Miss Heritage pageant was first hosted in Harare Zimbabwe on 13 December, where Shequera Grace King from Bahamas was Crowned.
