= Chickland =

Village in Trinidad

Coordinates: 10°25′N 61°23′W

Chickland is a village in the foothills of Central Trinidad, north of the world-renowned cocoa growing region Gran Couva and south-east of one of the earliest settlement areas for freed slaves Freeport. One of the featured sites in Chickland was the Ajoupa Pottery, which produced intricate and colourful ceramic pieces, such as tables and vanity vases that appear in hotels and villas throughout Trinidad and Tobago and the Caribbean. Other nearby attractions include the Temple in the Sea and Hanuman, the tallest statue of a Hindu deity outside of India, which is located in Waterloo. One of the oldest structures in Chickland is the Chickland RC Primary School, which is still operational. On Saturday evenings, it is quickly converted into a church, with evening mass for the congregation.

The population in Chickland is multi-cultural and very diverse. Every major festival and holiday is celebrated.

Farming and gardening is still an integral part of the village life in Chickland. The hills are cultivated with corns, vegetables and fruits trees. There a very little evidence of old life of harvesting sugar-cane, cocoa, coffee and tobacco. Goats and cows can be seen roaming freely.
