= Miss Earth México =

Mexican beauty contest

- Formation: 2002; 24 years ago
- Purpose: Beauty pageant
- Headquarters: Mexico City
- Location: Mexico
- Official language: Spanish
- National Director: Paul Marsell
- Affiliations: Miss Earth; Miss Intercontinental; Miss Eco International; The Miss Globe
- Website: missearthmexico.com

Miss Earth México is an annual beauty pageant in Mexico. The winner of Miss Earth Mexico obtains the right to represent the country in the Miss Earth pageant, the third most important beauty festival in the world, where the goal is to promote environmental protection.

== History ==
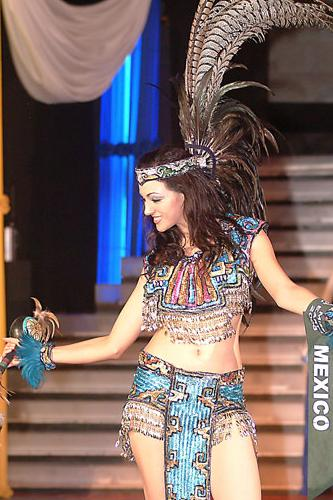
Miss Earth México 2008 Abigail Elizalde showcasing her country's national costume during Miss Earth 2008 pageant.

Miss Earth México, based in Mérida, Yucatán, is organized by the national director Paul Marsell. The pageant was established in order to elect Mexico's representative in the annual Miss Earth pageant and to promote environmental awareness and protection.

The national organization was founded in 2002, but the first national contest was not held until 2007. Titleholders prior to 2006 were chosen by the organizers in a private selection process. The first represented in Miss Earth 2002 by Libna Viruega Roldán from Distrito Federal, who was Miss Earth Mexico.

In 2008, Abigail Elizalde Romo, Miss Earth México 2008, advanced in the semifinal and final round for the first time for Mexico at the Miss Earth pageant and eventually won the Miss Water (second runner-up), one of the elemental crowns, in the Miss Earth 2008.

In 2018, Melissa Flores Godínez, Miss Earth México 2018, advanced in the semifinal and final round for the second time for Mexico at the Miss Earth pageant and eventually won the Miss Fire (trird runner-up), one of the elemental crowns, in the Miss Earth 2018.

== Titleholders ==
Below are the names of the annual titleholders of Miss Earth Mexico, listed in ascending order and according to the year in which they participated in Miss Earth. The states they represented during their national crowning or designation and their final placements and special awards acquired in the aforementioned global beauty competition are also displayed.

Color key

- : Finished as the winner
- : Finished as a runner-up
- : Finished as one of the Finalist/Semi-finalists

Year	Miss Earth Mexico	State	Competition performance	
Year	Miss Earth Mexico	State	Placements	Special award(s)
2026	Alexia Vianey Briviesca Espinosa	Yucatán	TBA	
2025	Génesis Vera Fernández	Veracruz	Top 12	People's Choice Award; (gold) Best Appearance; (gold) Silver Radiance Award
2024	Patricia Lagunes Ramos	Tamaulipas		(bronze) Upcycling fashion (Eco group)
2023	Martha Daniela Landín Camarillo	Aguascalientes		
2022	Indira Pérez Meneses	Veracruz		
2021	Natalia Denisse Durán Ramos	Tamaulipas		
2020	Graciela Ballesteros Castro	Coahuila		
2019	Hilary Osmara Islas Montés	Nayarit		(bronze) Miss Earth Flora of Naga City
2018	Melissa Flores Godínez	Michoacán	Miss Fire (3rd Runner-up)	(gold) Best National Costume (North & Central America); (gold) Best in Swimsuit (Water group); (gold) Resorts Wear (Water group); Best Eco-Media Award; Miss Tourist Clothing Competition; Miss Earth JACMI; Miss Psalmstre New Placenta
2017	Ana Karen Bustos González	San Luis Potosí		(silver) Best in Long Gown (Group 3)
2016	Itzel Paola Astudillo Aréchiga	Chiapas	Top 16	(gold) Best National Costume (Americas); (gold) Best in Swimsuit (Group 1); (gold) Best in Long Gown (Group 1); (bronze) Resorts Wear (Group 1); Miss Earth Yoshinoya; Miss Irosin; Best in Production Number; Miss Glutamax; Miss Isa
2015	Gladys Georgete Flores Simón	Puebla		
2014	Yareli Guadalupe Carrillo Salas	Sinaloa	Top 16	
2013	Yuselmi Kristal Silva Dávila	Tamaulipas	Top 8	Miss Golden Sunset; Miss Careline
2012	Lourdes Paola Aguilar Concha	Yucatán	Top 16	
2011	Casandra Ananké Becerra Vázquez	Distrito Federal	Top 8	(gold) Best in Evening Gown
2010	Claudia López Mollinedo	Tabasco		
2009	Natalia Quiñones Pérez	Jalisco		
2008	Abigail Elizalde Romo	Coahuila	Miss Water (2nd Runner-up)	(gold) Best in Swimsuit; Gandang Ricky Reyes Award; Jubille Foundation Award
2007	María Fernanda Cánovas Leal	Tamaulipas		
2006	Alina García Valdez	Yucatán		
2005	Lorena Jaime Hochstrasser	Yucatán		
2004	Valentina Cervera Avila	Yucatán		
2003	Lorena Irene Velarde Briceño	Jalisco		
2002	Libna Viruega Roldán	Distrito Federal		

=== Gallery of winners ===
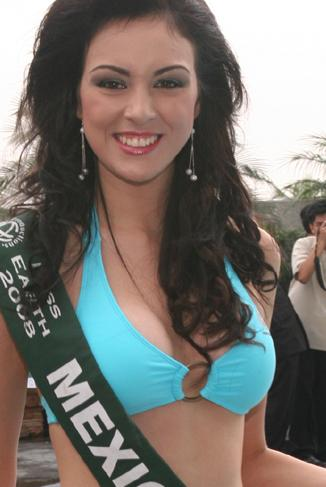
Miss Earth México 2008
Abigail Elizalde

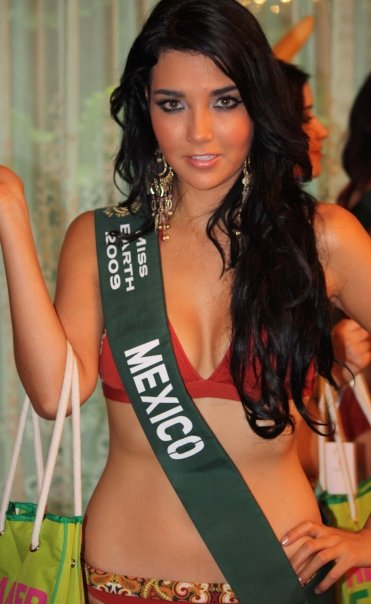
Miss Earth México 2009
Natalia Quiñones

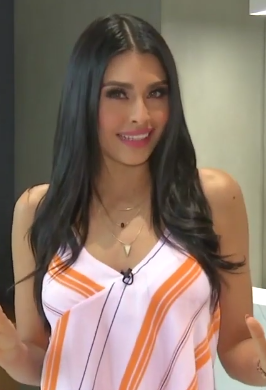
Miss Earth México 2013
Kristal Silva

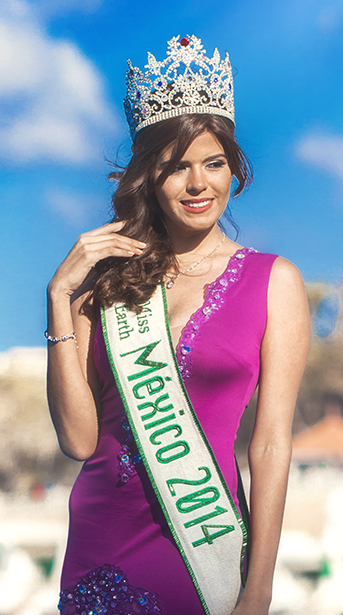
Miss Earth México 2014
Yareli Carrillo

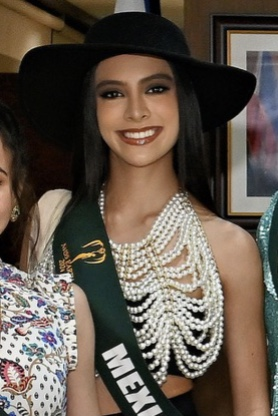
Miss Earth Mexico 2024
Patricia Lagunes

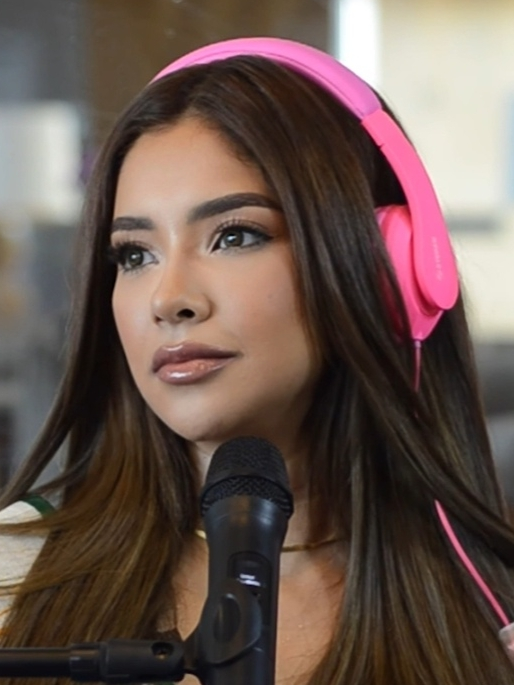
Miss Earth Mexico 2025
Génesis Vera

== Delegates at other pageants ==
=== Miss Intercontinental ===
In 2020, Verónica Salas acquired the franchise rights and became the National Director. She transformed it into a standalone organization.

Year	Delegate	State	Competition performance	
Year	Delegate	State	Placements	Special award(s)
Representatives from Miss Intercontinental Mexico
2025	Carolina Ruelas Pano	Sinaloa	Top 23	
2024	Alejandra Garduño Fuentes	Ciudad de México		
2023	Cristina Villegas Murillo	Jalisco	1st Runner-up	Miss Intercontinental North America; Miss Photogenic
2022	Litsy Michelle Luna Mellado	Tamaulipas		
2021	Paulina Uceda Escorcia	Michoacán	1st Runner-up	Miss Intercontinental North America; Best Body
~~2020~~	Due to the impact of COVID-19 pandemic, no pageant in 2020			
Representatives from Miss Earth Mexico
2019	Sofía Miñarro Pedraza	Querétaro		
2018	Ivanna Barradas Lobato	Chiapas	Top 20	Best Social Proyect
2017	Verónica Salas Vallejo	Estado de México	Miss Intercontinental 2017	Miss Intercontinental North America; Best in Swimsuit
2016	Martha Leticia Suárez Briano	Veracruz		
2015	Paulina Flores Cantú	Nuevo León	Top 17	

=== Miss Eco International ===
Year	Delegate	State	Competition performance	
Year	Delegate	State	Placements	Special award(s)
2026	Palmira Ariannda Ruiz Vigueras	Oaxaca	Miss Eco International 2026	Best Costume Carnival
2025	Diana Del Rey Duque	Guerrero	Top 20	Miss Eco Americas • Top Model
2024	María Lucía Ortega Ruíz	San Luis Potosí	Top 10	
2023	Andrea Torres Pérez	Michoacán	Top 20	Miss Eco Americas • Top Model
2022	Grecia Victoria Ramírez Soto	Zacatecas	Top 10	
2021	Astrid Moraga Molina	Veracruz		
~~2020~~	Due to the impact of COVID-19 pandemic, no pageant in 2020			
2019	Melissa de Anda García	Guanajuato		
2018	Mara Orduño Arce	Hidalgo	Top 20	
2017	Verónica Salas Vallejo	Estado de México	Top 20	
2016	Mónica Hernández Reynaga	Yucatán	Top 8	
2015	Yareli Guadalupe Carrillo Salas	Sinaloa	4th Runner-up	Miss Elegance

=== The Miss Globe ===
Year	Delegate	State	Competition performance	
Year	Delegate	State	Placements	Special award(s)
2025	Adriana Lizeth Bautista Reyes	Veracruz	Top 10	Miss Bikini
2024	Siu Ling Cotero Chio	Sinaloa	Did not compete	
2023	Alexia Briviesca Espinosa	Yucatán		
2022	Keely Janetyz Ruiz Morales	Veracruz		
2021	Lorena Herrera Fraga	Nuevo León		
2020	Rubí Moreno Garrido	Hidalgo	Did not compete	
2019	Alejandra Díaz de León Soler	San Luis Potosí	The Miss Globe 2019	
2018	Sofía Tanguma Villarreal	Nuevo León		
2017	Brenda Portelinha Delgadillo	Estado de México		
2016	Andrea Torres Damian	Sonora		
2015	Andrea Zenteno Vázquez	Chiapas	Top 10	Miss Photogenic

=== Miss Exclusive of the World ===
Year	Delegate	State	Competition performance	
Year	Delegate	State	Placements	Special award(s)
2016	Itzel Paola Astudillo Aréchiga	Chiapas	Did not compete	
2015	Alma Gloria Guzmán Rito	Baja California Sur	Top 20	
2014	Yuselmi Kristal Silva Dávila	Tamaulipas	Did not compete	
2013	Lourdes Paola Aguilar Concha	Yucatan	Top 20	
2012	Casandra Ananké Becerra Vázquez	Distrito Federal	Miss Exclusive of the World 2012	

== See also ==
- Señorita México
- Nuestra Belleza México
- Miss Mexico Organization
- Mister México
- Mr World Mexico
