= Yucatán Siglo XXI Convention Centre =

Coordinates: 21°2′0.38″N 89°37′46.39″W

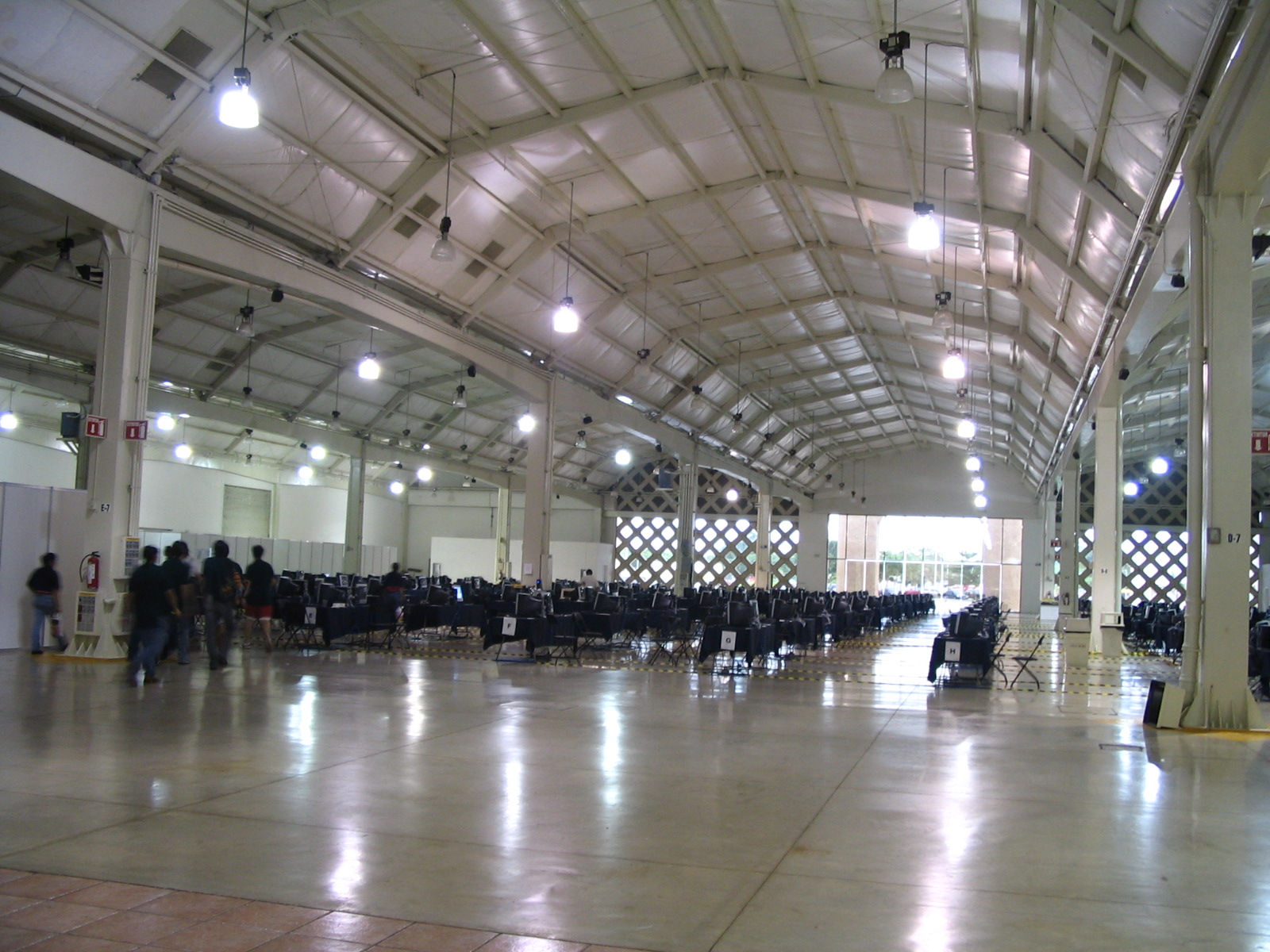
Salon Chichen Itza in the Siglo XXI Convention Centre

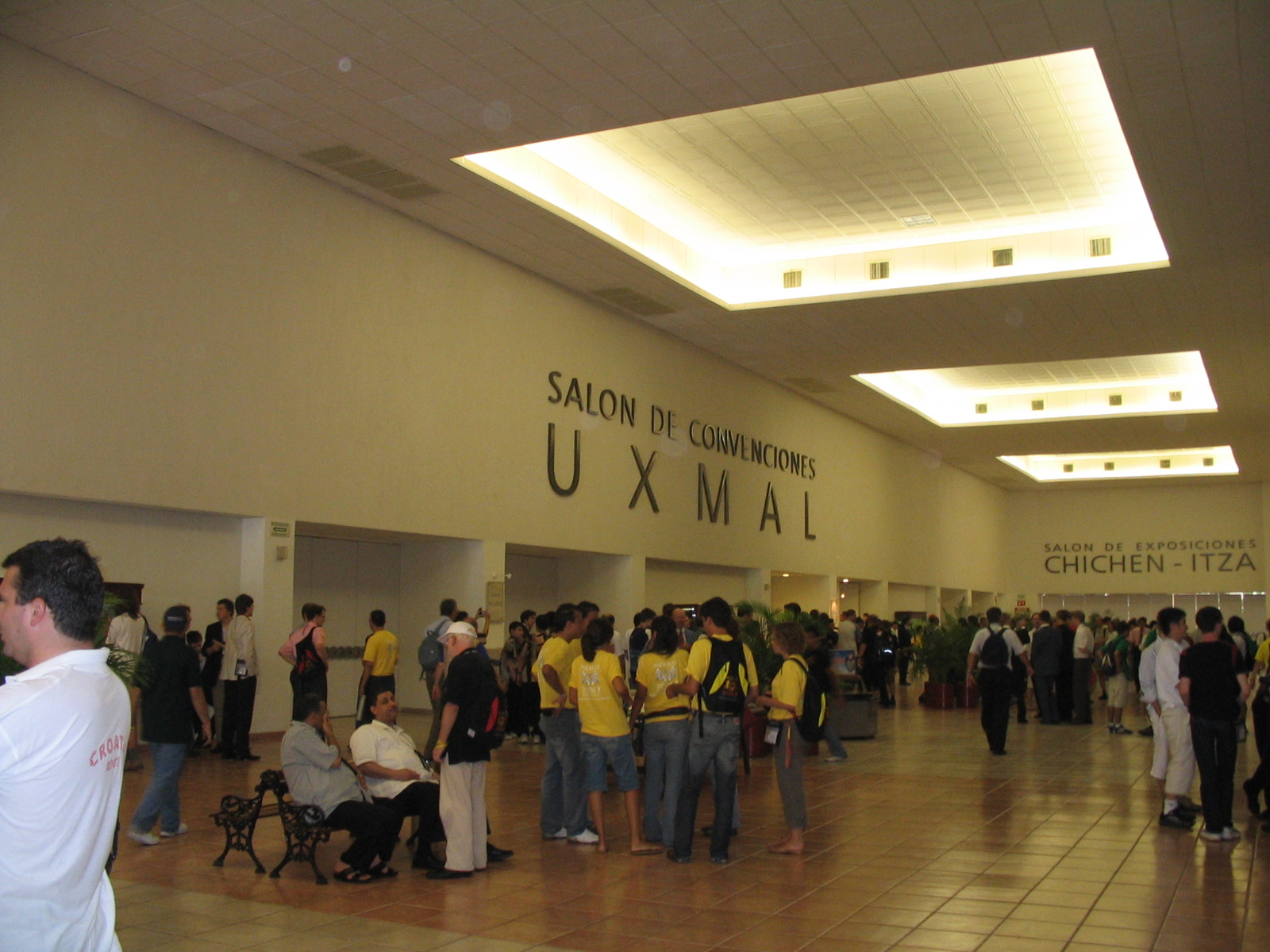
Lobby

Yucatán Siglo XXI (Spanish for "21st century") is a convention centre located in northern Mérida, Yucatán, Mexico. Halls in Siglo XXI have names referring to Maya heritage sites in the region such as "Salón Chichén Itzá", "Salón Uxmal", and "Salón Ek Balam". All of the halls except for Salon Chichen Itza have chandeliers. Salon Chichen Itza, however, is the largest room in the complex with 80,297 square feet of space and can seat up to 12,000 for concerts, ice shows, sporting events including basketball, hockey, etc.

== Chronological list of events held at Siglo XXI ==
- Twenty-Sixth FAO Regional Conference for Latin America and The Caribbean (10–14 April 2000)
- International Mathematical Olympiad 2005 (8–19 July 2005)
- Tenth Annual National Bachillerato Anáhuac Awards (March 2006)
- International Olympiad in Informatics 2006 (13–20 August 2006)
