= List of Supranational Venezuela editions =

The following is a list of Supranational Venezuela pageant edition and information.

== Supranational Venezuela editions ==
- Designated

| Year | Edition | Miss | Mister | Date | Venue | Host city | Female/Male entrants |
|---|---|---|---|---|---|---|---|
Miss Venezuela & independent franchisors era
| 2009 | 1st | Distrito Capital | Not awarded | N/A | | | |
| 2010 | 2nd | Táchira | Not awarded | N/A | | | |
| 2011 | 3rd | Lara | Not awarded | N/A | | | |
| 2012 | 4th | Zulia | Not awarded | N/A | | | |
| 2013 | 5th | Zulia | Not awarded | N/A | | | |
| 2014 | 6th | Zulia | Not awarded | N/A | | | |
| 2015 | 7th | Vargas | Not awarded | N/A | | | |
| 2016 | 8th | Monagas | Capital District | N/A | | | |
| 2017 | 9th | Táchira | Aragua | N/A | | | |
| 2018 | 10th | Monagas | Miranda | N/A | | | |
Miss Earth Venezuela era
| 2019 | 1st | Carabobo | Mérida | August 22 | Centro Cultural Chacao | Caracas, Capital District | 30; 1 |
| 2020 | No competition held due to the COVID-19 pandemic | | | | | | |
| 2021 | 2nd | Nueva Esparta | Zulia | May 27 | Globovisión Studios | Caracas, Capital District | 10; 10 |
| 2022 | 3rd | Miranda | Zulia | June 9 | Teatro Junín | Caracas, Capital District | 13; 11 |
Reinas y Reyes de Venezuela era
| 2023 | 1st | Mérida | Distrito Capital | November 17 | Poliedro de Caracas | Caracas, Distrito Capital | 14 |

== Host city by number ==
Currently all 4 editions are held in Caracas.

| City | Hosts | Year(s) |
|---|---|---|
| Caracas | 4 | 2019–2023 |

Location count

Currently 4 theaters had served as locations for the Supranational Venezuela pageant.

| Location | Hosts | Year(s) |
|---|---|---|
| Poliedro de Caracas | 1 | 2023 |
| Teatro Junín | 1 | 2022 |
| Globovisión Studios | 1 | 2021 |
| Centro Cultural Chacao | 1 | 2019 |

== Hosts and artists ==
The following is a list of Supranational Venezuela hosts and invited artists through the years.

| Year | Edition | Hosts | Co-hosts | Artists | Broadcaster | Ref |
|---|---|---|---|---|---|---|
| 2019 | 1st | Leo Aldana; Rosangélica Monasterio | Franklin Salomón; Irrael Gómez | Guaco; El Encuentro | Globovisión | |
| 2021 | 2nd | Alejandro Carreño; Ana Karina Jardim | | | Globovisión | |
| 2022 | 3rd | Melisa Rauseo; Jesús De Alva | Gabriela de la Cruz; Alejandro Carreño; Ronald Sanoja | Luis Fernando Borja; Lion Lázaro; Jennifer Moya | Globovisión | |

== See also ==
- List of Miss Supranational Venezuela titleholders
- List of Mister Supranational Venezuela titleholders
