= Yendri Sánchez =

Venezuelan known for breaking into public acts of various personalities

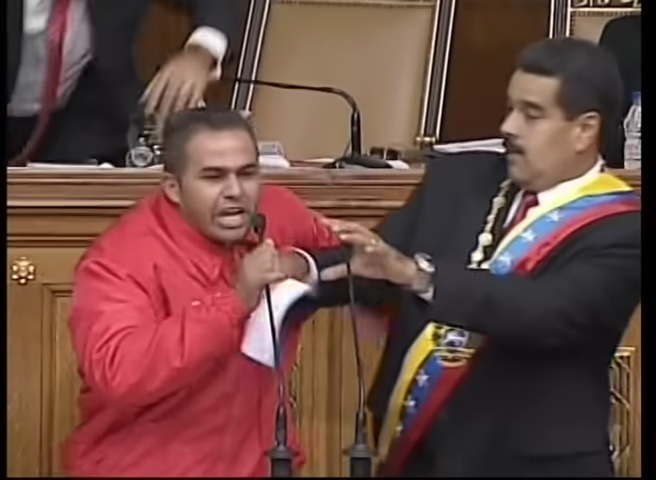
- Sánchez in 2013 during Nicolás Maduro's inauguration
- Born: 1988; Maracaibo, Zulia, Venezuela
- Died: 2 August 2018 (aged 29–30); Ciudad Ojeda, Venezuela
- Known for: Interrupting the inauguration of Nicolás Maduro in 2013, among other events.
- Parent(s): Tomás Sánchez and Celina Sánchez

Yendri Jesús Sánchez González (Maracaibo, Zulia, 1988 – Ciudad Ojeda, Zulia, 2 August 2018) was a Venezuelan known for breaking into public acts of various personalities. His most remembered appearance was on 19 April 2013, when he interrupted the inauguration of Nicolás Maduro in the National Assembly of Venezuela.

== Biography ==
Sánchez had bipolar disorder and schizophrenia, as determined by psychiatric tests he underwent as an adult. His parents divorced when he was four years old. As a child he received numerous citations in many schools; they made fun of him for cheating on exams and for being "insane". In an interview with Carla Angola on the program Buenas Noches, on Globovisión, Sánchez stated that at the age of eleven he started a competition with a friend, Juan Salas, to decide who could sneak into more public events. Sánchez began by interrupting the musicians Servando y Florentino, in Caracas, and continued climbing for seven hours on pier 21 of the Maracaibo Bridge; after asking the governor of Zulia for help, he received ten thousand bolivars by then.

He later hugged Lionel Messi at the Copa América and took the crown from Miss Cojedes, Hannelly Quintero, during Miss Venezuela 2007, after posing as Miss Zulia's stylist. After the incident, he was even rebuked by Osmel Sousa and it was the staff's priority to identify him during beauty pageants. For two consecutive years he went indoors to the baseball field where the Águilas del Zulia played. At the Luis Aparicio stadium he climbed on the scaffolding where Tito El Bambino was. In a presentation he took the chain from Chayanne, jewel, he explains, that he sold for 25,000 bolívares and it was used to buy a plasma TV, a DVD, a laptop, clothes, shoes and food. During a raid by the Bolivarian Intelligence Service (SEBIN) on his ranch, all his purchased belongings were stolen by the troops. Sánchez has also infiltrated Manuel Rosales' campaign closings, and in one act he approached President Hugo Chávez posing as an escort. From then on, every time Chávez visited the state of Zulia, he sent SEBIN troops to walk his family, give them food and give them money, knowing that they could circumvent his security, and when the presidential escorts called the intelligence service to report that Chávez was leaving the state were returned home. In 2011, a file was opened on Yendri for the charge of aggravated robbery in a frustrated degree, being accused by a doctor from the PDVSA clinic, in La Salina, Cabimas, because she found him in his office checking his wallet, despite the fact that Yendri assured that "he had not stolen anything from her."

In 2013, Yendri climbed on the platform during an act of the presidential candidate Henrique Capriles and on 19 April 2013, Yendri sneaked into the inauguration of Nicolás Maduro. In an interview with Panorama, he explains that he did it because he wanted to "beat Juan" and ask Maduro for help for his family; He put on a borrowed red jacket, went to the National Assembly and pretended to be the son of Diosdado Cabello. The security guards, surprised, did not ask him for anything and sat him down next to María Gabriela Chávez and El Potro Álvarez. When she asked him who he was, he replied that he was the son of Jesse Chacón. After 15 minutes of starting the national network, Yendri ran to Maduro, took his microphone from him and asked for help before being intercepted by the security of the event. The image of the signal of the national network that transmitted the ceremony and the sound were turned off, and Maduro reappeared moments later declaring that there had been "a security breach."

For the act, Sánchez was sentenced to one year and five months in prison in the Coro Penitentiary Community, Falcón state, where his mental illness worsened, facing charges of terrorism, organized crime, criminal association and aggravated offense against head of government, charged by prosecutor Katherine Haringhton. Although Maduro said during the broadcast that he would speak with Sánchez later, he never contacted him. Upon being released, he was arrested again two days later for giving statements to the media at six CICPC police stations, the scientific police. Yendri was released after attempting suicide during his detention by setting his mattress on fire and throwing himself over glass doors when going to the bathroom once, breaking part of his arm. A commissioner paid for the medicines and the sewing of 18 stitches on his arm, and another commissioner paid for three psychiatric sessions.

He lived with a friend in Ciudad Ojeda, in the state of Zulia, because the ranch where he grew up, also in Ciudad Ojeda, was demolished to build a house offered by President Chávez. Despite having been started and having the facade ready, it was flooded because it was not finished, it had no electricity or connected services and it lacked floors and bathrooms, making it uninhabitable.

Yendri Sánchez was found dead on 6 August 2018 in the house where he lived, in a state of decomposition, where, according to security personnel, his hands and feet were tied, with a bag over his head.

Two weeks later, the scientific police of the CICPC arrested three suspects in Ciudad Ojeda, according to the Ministry of the Interior, the subjects confessed "to having incurred in an episode of sexual extravagance in which they strangled" Yendri Sánchez, ruling out robbery as the reason for the homicide initially considered by the investigative bodies.

== See also ==
- Political prisoners in Venezuela
