= Stefanía Fernández =

Venezuelan model, presenter, and beauty queen

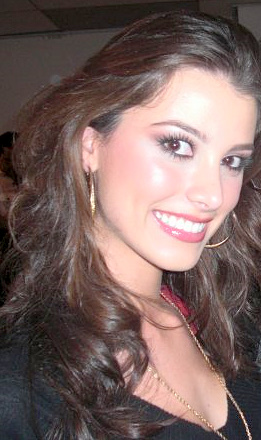
- Stefanía during a fashion show in Caracas, Venezuela
- Born: Stefanía Fernández Krupij; September 4, 1990 (age 36); Mérida, Venezuela
- Height: 178 cm (5 ft 10 in)
- Spouse: Bernardo Asuaje (m. 2017; div. 2020)
- Partner: Ender Inciarte (2020–present)
- Children: 2
- Beauty pageant titleholder
- Title: Miss Trujillo 2008; Miss Venezuela 2008; Miss Universe 2009
- Hair color: Brown
- Eye color: Brown
- Major competitions: Miss Trujillo 2008; (Winner); Miss Venezuela 2008; (Winner); Miss Universe 2009; (Winner)

Stefanía Fernández Krupij (Spanish pronunciation: [estefaˈnia feɾˈnandes]; born 4 September 1990) is a Venezuelan journalist, model and beauty queen who won the Miss Venezuela 2008 and Miss Universe 2009 titles. She entered the Guinness World Records by being the first Miss Universe winner who was crowned by a compatriot and her predecessor as Miss Universe, Dayana Mendoza, who had similarly represented Venezuela during the previous year's competition.

Currently, she runs a beauty line, AMMATERRE, vegan skin care products.

== Personal life ==
In 2012, she began a romantic relationship with the Venezuelan TV magnate and former owner of Globovision, Carlos Alberto Zuloaga Siso, a romance that ended two years later. Her mother, Nadia Krupij Holojad a pharmacist, was born in Venezuela of Polish descent, while her Spanish father, José Luis Fernández, is a lumber businessman (wood carving) from Pontevedra, Galicia.

Stefania Fernandez married Venezuelan investor Bernardo Asuaje on 6 May 2017 in Cartagena, Colombia. In June 2020 she announced her divorce.

Shortly after announcing her divorce with businessman Bernardo Asuaje, in December 2020, she confirmed to be dating Venezuelan baseball player Ender Inciarte. In May 2021, she welcomed a baby boy with Inciarte.

== Pageantry ==
=== Miss Venezuela 2008 ===
Fernández won the Miss Venezuela 2008 title in a pageant held in Caracas on 10 September 2008. She was crowned by the outgoing titleholder, Dayana Mendoza, Miss Venezuela 2007 and Miss Universe 2008. Fernández also won the "Miss Elegance", "Best Body", and "Best Face", titles. She became the second Miss Trujillo to win that title since the Miss Venezuela pageant first began in 1952 and also the second Miss Trujillo to win Miss Universe. The first was Bárbara Palacios, Miss Venezuela 1986 and Miss Universe 1986.

Miss Universe 2008, Dayana Mendoza (also from Venezuela), crowned her as Miss Universe 2009 on 23 August 2009, in Nassau, Bahamas. This marked the first time in Miss Universe history the same country won the crown in consecutive years. Her prize package included cash; a year contract promoting Miss Universe; world travel; a rent-free, prestigious New York luxury apartment; a gift bag stuffed with designer shoes, dresses, and beauty products; a US$100,000 stipend for a two-year course at the New York Film Academy; and free access to famous fashion houses and beauty parlors. Fernández vowed to spend her year-long reign traveling the world raising awareness on humanitarian issues and promoting education regarding HIV/AIDS. Fernández is the last teenager to capture the crown to date.

=== Miss Universe 2009 ===
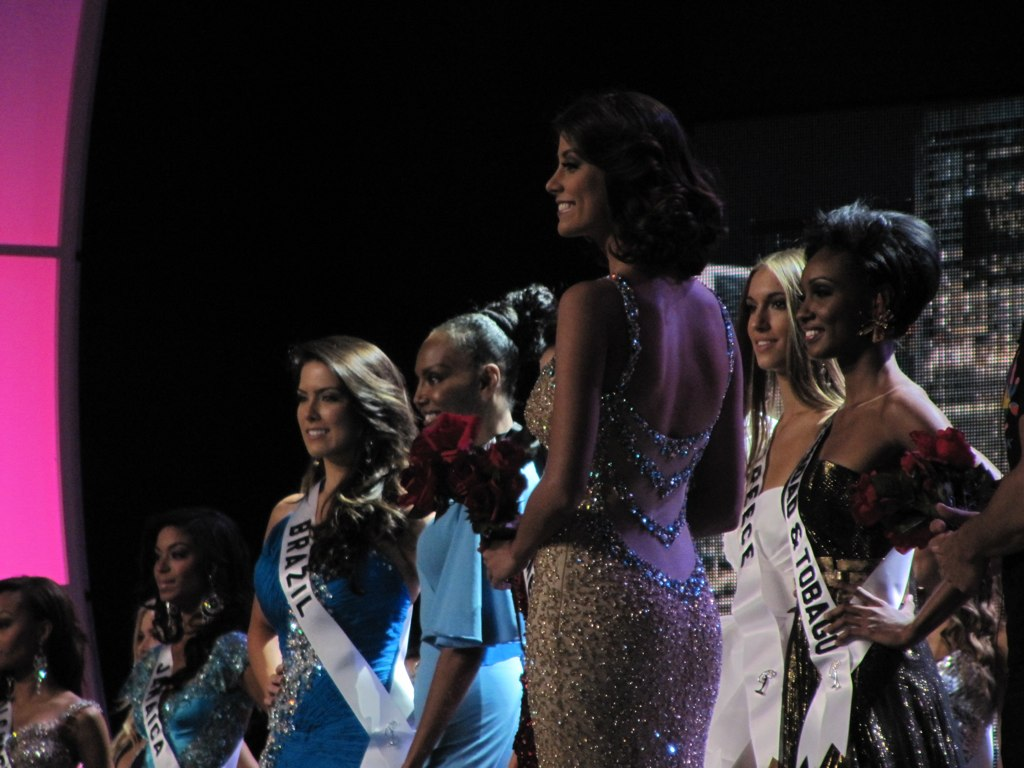
Stefanía during the Miss Universe 2010.

After her crowning, Fernández was interviewed by CNN en Español, Fox News, EFE agency (Spain), the Associated Press, Univision, Reuters, RTN (Ukraine), Televisa (Mexico), Venevisión (Venezuela), Caracol Televisión (Colombia), La Mega, Telemetro (Panama), MUN2, Televen (Venezuela), RCN TV (Colombia), Promar TV, Globovisión (Venezuela), Telemundo, Telecentro, Venevision Plus, Gem FM (Indonesia), The Wendy Williams Show, NBC's Today, Fox & Friends, Don Francisco Presenta, El Gordo y la Flaca, and others. Her arrival to Venezuela was transmitted by Venezuelan television; she had a homage in Super Sabado Sensacional during five hour special on Venevisión (Venezuela's main TV network).

Fernández received a Guinness record for being the first contestant to Miss Universe which is crowned by a compatriot (Dayana Mendoza, Miss Universe 2008).

The President of Venezuela, Hugo Chávez, congratulated Fernández, and he gave her his support with her campaign against AIDS. He also gave his government's support. In October, she travelled to Jakarta, Bandung and Medan, in Indonesia, where she crowned the Indonesian representative for the Miss Universe 2010 pageant.

In November, she traveled again to Indonesia, specifically to the Bali island, when she filmed a commercial of vitamins. On her return to New York, she was in a press conference about HIV, in which she appeared with Ban Ki-moon, the Secretary-General of the United Nations, and with recognised Venezuelan fashion designer Carolina Herrera. On 5 November 2009, she served as a presenter at the Latin Grammy Awards in Las Vegas, United States, sharing with Puerto Rican salsa singer Víctor Manuelle. At her second presentation in Venezuela, specifically in the Plaza de Toros Monumental de Maracaibo, where there was a crowd of 15,000 people, they gave a recognition (Orchid Award) to Fernández at Orchid Festival of Chinita Fair.

She also traveled to Cannes, France, on 9 December 2009, for the Five Star Diamond awards, with Miss USA Kristen Dalton, and to Willemstad, Curaçao and Barquisimeto, Venezuela, as well, in early January 2010, for the Procesión de la Divina Pastora (Procession of the Holy Shepherdess). Fernández traveled to Puerto Rico in February 2010 to host Levántate, a Telemundo TV show; then travelled to New York, where she appeared on The Oprah Winfrey Show.

In September, March, and April, she travelled to Moscow, São Paulo, Mumbai, Nassau, Caracas, and Prague, where she crowned the respective representatives of those countries for the Miss Universe 2010 pageant.

She then flew to Colombia (she was invited to promote the Kimberly-Clark brand), Panama (where she served as a presenter for Sony), and to Puerto Rico again, for the Puerto Rico Open.

In May, Fernández travelled to República Dominicana Fashion Week in the Dominican Republic. Shortly thereafter, Fernández was named in the 50 Most Beautiful People list by People en Español.

On 29 April 2010, Fernández served as a presenter at the Latin Billboard Music Awards in Puerto Rico.

In March 2010, Stefania became the official face of Avon Products.

During her reign, Fernández travelled to Indonesia, Curaçao, Venezuela, France, Puerto Rico, Russia, Colombia, Panama, the Czech Republic, the Bahamas, Mexico, the Dominican Republic, Brazil, India, Argentina, Rwanda, and Ecuador for an AIDS Awareness Tour in 2010, in addition to numerous trips around the United States.

== Conflict with the Venezuelan government ==
7-star Flag of Venezuela, used by Fernández.

On 23 August 2010, Fernández passed her crown to Ximena Navarrete, Miss Mexico. During her final catwalk, she unveiled a Venezuelan flag with only seven stars. The Venezuelan parliament (the National Assembly) had voted a modification of the flag from seven to eight stars in 2006; former President Hugo Chávez had favored this decision. The display of the old flag was seen by Investor's Business Daily as a protest against the new policies of Chávez. During the 2014 Venezuelan protests, Fernández took part in the "Your Voice is Your Power" campaign denouncing violence, human rights violations and the censorship of media in Venezuela. She appears in photos for the campaign gagged, bound and bloody, symbolizing the violence, censorship and the deaths of protesters that Venezuela was experiencing.

During the taking of the pictures, Fernandez explained that "Making all the #SinMordaza pictures didn’t take more than an hour, but I cried and felt rage" while being a voice for human rights and showing support for protesters against the government of Nicolás Maduro.

== Titles ==
- Miss Universe (2009)
- Miss Venezuela (2008)
- Miss Trujillo (2008)

== Awards ==
- 2009: Guinness record (for being the first Miss Universe winner who was crowned by a compatriot)

== See also ==
- Dayana Mendoza
- Marelisa Gibson
- María Milagros Véliz
- Laksmi Rodríguez
- Gabriela Isler

Awards and achievements
Preceded by (Venezuela) Dayana Mendoza	Miss Universe; 2009	Succeeded by (Mexico) Ximena Navarrete
Preceded by Dayana Mendoza	Miss Venezuela; 2008	Succeeded by Marelisa Gibson
Preceded by Luna Ramos	Miss Trujillo; 2008	Succeeded by Elizabeth Mosquera
