= Miss Venezuela 2009 =

56th edition of the Miss Venezuela pageant

- Date: September 24, 2009
- Presenters: Daniel Sarcos; Maite Delgado; Boris Izaguirre; Dayana Mendoza
- Entertainment: Daddy Yankee; Tito El Bambino
- Venue: Poliedro de Caracas, Caracas, Venezuela
- Broadcaster: Venevision
- Entrants: 20
- Placements: 10
- Winner: Marelisa Gibson; Miranda

Miss Venezuela 2009 was the 56th Miss Venezuela pageant, held at the Poliedro de Caracas in Caracas, Venezuela, on September 24, 2009.

Stefanía Fernández, Miss Venezuela 2008 and Miss Universe 2009, crowned Miss Miranda, Marelisa Gibson, as her successor at the end of the event. The Miss World Venezuela title went to Miss Zulia, Adriana Vasini while Elizabeth Mosquera, Miss Trujillo, obtained the title of Miss Venezuela International. The 1st Runner Up Mariángela Bonanni was appointed as Miss Venezuela Earth.

It was on that year that the present MV anthem was sung for the first time, with a new melody replacing the iconic tune used for 34 years, with a slight change in lyrics.

== Contestants ==
State	Contestant	Age	Height	Hometown
Amazonas	Jéssica Adriana Guillén Blanco	24	177 cm (5 ft 9 1/2 in)	Caracas
Anzoátegui	Flory Gabriela Díez Estrada	20	173 cm (5 ft 8 in)	Barcelona
Apure	Carolina Charlott Da Silva Gonçalves	22	174 cm (5 ft 8 1/2 in)	Maracay
Aragua	Andreína Vanessa Castro Martínez	18	173 cm (5 ft 8 in)	Maracay
Barinas	Esmeralda Alejandrina Yaniche Vásquez	18	178 cm (5 ft 10 in)	Puerto Ordaz
Bolívar	Sandra Margarita Alves Burillo	20	175 cm (5 ft 9 in)	Puerto Ordaz
Carabobo	María José González Ginestre	19	174 cm (5 ft 8 1/2 in)	Valencia
Distrito Capital	Patricia Elizabeth de Andrade Rodríguez	20	174 cm (5 ft 8 1/2 in)	Caracas
Guárico	Manuela Vieira Díaz	23	170 cm (5 ft 7 in)	Valencia
Lara	Yoli Rosangel Sevilla Campos	18	180 cm (5 ft 11 in)	San Felipe
Mérida	María de Luz Da Silva Dos Santos	19	176 cm (5 ft 9 1/2 in)	Maracay
Miranda	Marelisa Gibson Villegas	21	178 cm (5 ft 10 in)	Caracas
Monagas	Yuleima Yulibeth "Yuly" Tovar González	25	172 cm (5 ft 7 1/2 in)	Ciudad Ojeda
Nueva Esparta	Cristina Andrea Carmona Veiga	22	181 cm (5 ft 11 1/2 in)	Caracas
Portuguesa	María Gabriela Pastrán Duque	24	177 cm (5 ft 9 1/2 in)	Táriba
Sucre	Daniela del Carmen Morales Verde	21	175 cm (5 ft 9 in)	Cumaná
Táchira	Mariángela Haydée Manuela Bonanni Randazzo	21	177 cm (5 ft 9 1/2 in)	San Cristóbal
Trujillo	Ana Elizabeth Mosquera Gómez	18	176 cm (5 ft 9 1/2 in)	Valera
Vargas	Patricia Reyina Zavala Nicoloso	24	173 cm (5 ft 8 in)	Punto Fijo
Zulia	Adriana Cristina Vasini Sánchez	22	178 cm (5 ft 10 in)	Maracaibo
