= Vanessa Peretti =

Venezuelan model

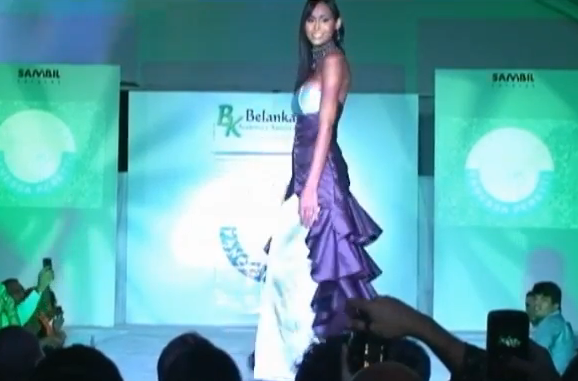
- Born: Vanessa Jackeline Gómez Peretti; March 21, 1986 (age 40); Cumaná, Sucre, Venezuela
- Other name: Vanessa Peretti
- Height: 5 ft 11 in (1.80 m)
- Beauty pageant titleholder
- Hair color: Black
- Eye color: Black
- Major competitions: Miss Venezuela 2006 (Miss Venezuela International 2006); Miss International 2007 (semifinalist); Teen Model Venezuela 2004 (1st runner up)

Vanessa Jackeline Gómez Peretti (born March 21, 1986) is a Venezuelan model and beauty pageant titleholder who won Miss Venezuela International 2006. She is 1.80 m (5 ft 11 in) tall.

Peretti was the first deaf woman to compete in the Miss Venezuela pageant, when she represented the Sucre state. She competed in Miss International 2007 on October 15 in Japan against another deaf woman, Sophie Vouzelaud from France.

== See also ==
- Ly Jonaitis
- Claudia Suárez
- Dayana Mendoza

Preceded by (Barinas, Venezuela) Daniela Di Giacomo	Miss Venezuela International; 2006	Succeeded by (Carabobo) Dayana Colmenares
Preceded by Jictzad Viña	Miss Sucre; 2006	Succeeded by Andrea Matthies
