= List of Mister Supranational Venezuela titleholders =

Mister Supranational Venezuela titleholders

The following is a list of Mister Supranational Venezuela titleholders from the competition's inaugural edition in 2016 to present.

== Mister Supranational Venezuela titleholders ==
Color key

- Declared as winner
- Ended as runner-up
- Ended as top 5/8 qualification
- Ended as one of the finalists or semifinalists
- Ended as special awards winner

† = deceased

Year	Represented	Titleholder	Birth	Age (Note: Ages at the time of Mister Supranational Venezuela)	Hometown	Location	Date	Entrants	Placement
2016	Distrito Capital	Gustavo Acevedo^{[α]}	January 3, 1997	19	Caracas	N/A	November 21, 2016	N/A	Top 10 in Mister Supranational 2016
**2017**	**Aragua**	**Gabriel Correa^{[α]}**	**February 17, 1989**	**28**	**Maracay**	**N/A**	**June 25, 2017**	**N/A**	**Mister Supranational 2017**
2018	Miranda	Jeudiel Condado^{[α]}	May 11, 1990	28	San Antonio de Los Altos	N/A	June 5, 2018	N/A	Unplaced in Mister Supranational 2018
2019	Mérida	Leonardo Carrero^{[α]}	November 1, 1992	26	El Vigía	Centro Cultural Chacao, Caracas	August 22, 2019	N/A	4th Runner-Up in Mister Supranational 2019
2020	No competition held due to the COVID-19 pandemic								
2021	Zulia	William Badell	June 29, 1996	24	Maracaibo	Globovisión Studios, Caracas	May 27, 2021	5	2nd Runner-Up in Mister Supranational 2021
2022	Distrito Capital	Anthony Gallardo	May 24, 1993	29	Caracas	Teatro Junín, Caracas	June 9, 2022	11	Top 20 in Mister Supranational 2022
2023	Zulia	Jorge Eduardo Núñez	September 23, 1994	27	Cabimas	Teatro Junín, Caracas	June 9, 2022	11	Unplaced (Top 25) in Mister Supranational 2023
2024	Distrito Capital (No. 8)	Marcos De Freitas	July 21, 1999	24	Caracas	Poliedro de Caracas, Caracas	November 17, 2023	14	3rd Runner-Up in Mister Supranational 2024
2025	Distrito Capital	Víctor Battista^{[α]}	September 29, 1995	29	Caracas	Globovisión Studios, Caracas	March 29, 2025	Designated	TBA

Notes

- **^α** Designated.

=== Winners by state/region ===
State	Number	Years
**Distrito Capital**	4	2016; 2022; 2024; 2025
**Zulia**	2	2021; 2023
**Mérida**	1	2019
**Miranda**	1	2018
**Aragua**	1	**2017**

The state who later won the Mister Supranational title indicated in bold

Debut wins

Not including states who were inherited the title.

Decade	States/Federal District
2010s	List: 2016: Distrito Capital; 2017: Aragua; 2018: Miranda; 2019: Mérida
2020s	List: 2021: Zulia

=== States have yet to win Mister Supranational Venezuela ===
There have been no Mister Supranational Venezuela winners from the following states:

- (Amazonas, Venezuela) Amazonas
- Anzoátegui
- Apure
- (Barinas, Venezuela) Barinas
- (Bolívar (state)) Bolívar
- Carabobo
- (Cojedes, Venezuela) Cojedes
- Delta Amacuro
- Falcón
- Guárico
- (La Guaira (state)) La Guaira
- (Lara, Venezuela) Lara
- Monagas
- Nueva Esparta
- (Portuguesa (Venezuela)) Portuguesa
- (Sucre, Venezuela) Sucre
- Táchira
- (Trujillo (state)) Trujillo
- Yaracuy

=== Winners by geographical region ===
Region	Titles	Years
Capital	5	2016, 2018, 2022, 2024, 2025
Zulian	2	2021, 2023
Andean	1	2019
Central	1	2017
Central-Western	0	
Eastern	0	
Guayana	0	
Insular	0	
Llanos	0	

=== Winners by age ===
Age	Titles	Years
29	2	2022, 2025
24	2	2021, 2024
28	2	2017, 2018
27	1	2023
26	1	2019
19	1	2016

== See also ==
- List of Mister Venezuela titleholders
