= Claudia Suárez =

Venezuelan model and former beauty pageant winner

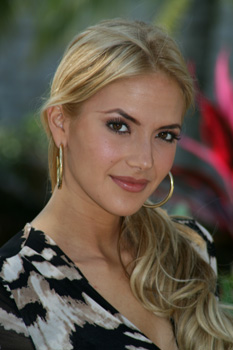
- Born: Claudia Paola Suárez Fernández; May 16, 1987 (age 39); Mérida, Venezuela
- Height: 5 ft 10.5 in (1.79 m)
- Beauty pageant titleholder
- Hair color: Blonde
- Eye color: Brown
- Major competitions: Miss Venezuela 2006 (Miss World Venezuela); Miss World 2007 (Top 16)

Claudia Paola Suárez Fernández (born May 16, 1987) is a Venezuelan model and beauty pageant titleholder who was crowned Miss World Venezuela 2006 and represented her country at Miss World 2007 where she placed Top 16.

Suárez, who stands 5 ft 10.5 in (1.791 m) tall, represented the state of Mérida in the national beauty pageant Miss Venezuela 2006, on September 14, 2006, and obtained the title of Miss Venezuela Mundo 2007, after placing second to Ly Jonaitis of the state of Guárico. On December 1, 2007, she represented her country in the Miss World 2007 pageant in Sanya (China), placing among the top 16 semifinalists. On January 26, 2008, she placed 2nd runner-up at the Miss Atlantico Internacional 2008 in Punta del Este, Uruguay.

== See also ==
- Ly Jonaitis
- Vanessa Peretti

Awards and achievements
Preceded by Federica Guzmán (Caracas)	Miss World Venezuela; 2006	Succeeded by Hannelly Quintero (Cojedes)
