= Adriana Vasini =

Venezuelan model and beauty queen

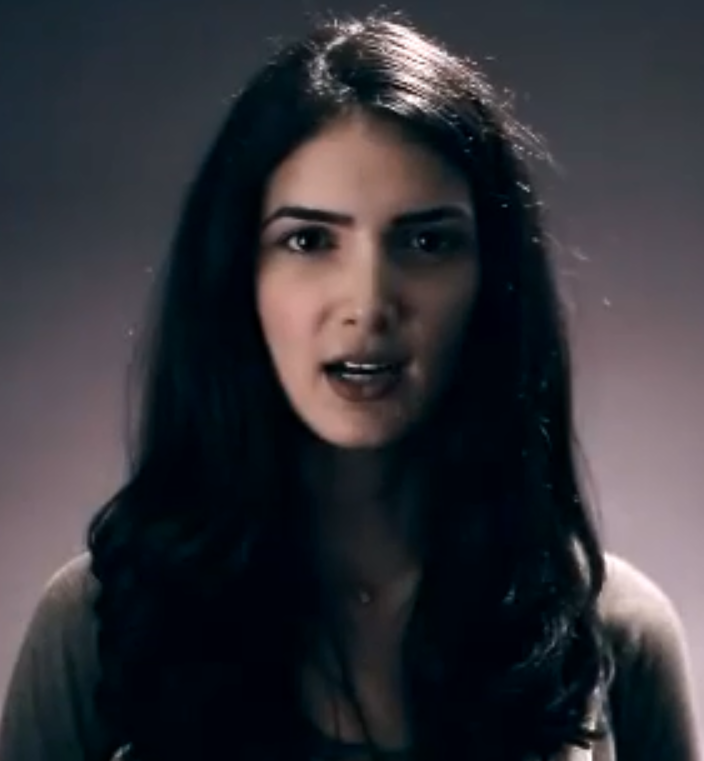
- Vasini in 2014
- Born: Adriana Cristina Vasini Sánchez; July 30, 1987 (age 39); Maracaibo, Venezuela
- Height: 1.78 m (5 ft 10 in)
- Spouse: Rene Balza (m. 2015)
- Beauty pageant titleholder
- Title: Miss Zulia 2009; Miss World Venezuela 2009; Reina Hispanoamericana 2009
- Hair color: Brown
- Eye color: Brown
- Major competitions: Miss Venezuela 2009 (Miss World Venezuela); Reina Hispanoamericana Reina 2009 (Winner); Miss World 2010 (2nd Runner-Up)

Adriana Cristina Vasini Sánchez (born July 30, 1987 in Maracaibo) is a Venezuelan model and beauty pageant titleholder who won the titles of Miss World Venezuela 2009 and Reina Hispanoamericana 2009. She represented Venezuela in the Miss World 2010 on October 30, 2010 in Sanya, China and placed 2nd Runner-Up.

== Early life ==
Vasini is the daughter of Pilar Sánchez, a former beauty pageant titleholder from Zulia. She began modeling at age 16 for Maracaibo-based designer Miriam Rodriguez, and later with Douglas Tapia and Mayela Camacho. Prior to competing in Miss Venezuela 2009, she was studying Medicine at the University of Zulia in Maracaibo.

== Miss World Venezuela 2009 ==
Vasini, who stands 1.78 m (5 ft 10 in) tall, competed as Miss Zulia in her country's national beauty pageant, Miss Venezuela 2009, on September 24, 2009, and obtained the title of Miss World Venezuela 2009. A notable moment of her participation in Miss Venezuela 2009 came during the swimsuit segment when Vasini, in a calculated manner, dropped her wrap and picked it up with her right foot to the delight of the crowd.

== Reina Hispanoamericana 2009 ==
On October 29, 2009, she participated and captured the crown of the 2009 Reina Hispanoamericana pageant, held in Santa Cruz, Bolivia.

== Miss World 2010 ==
As the official representative of her country to the 2010 Miss World pageant held in Sanya, China, Vasini became one of the Top 20 finalists during the Miss World Top Model fast track event held on October 23, 2010 and a Top 10 finalist in Miss World Talent, held on October 26, 2010. She finished the competition placing second runner-up.

Awards and achievements
Preceded by (Brazil) Vivian Noronha Cia	Reina Hispanoamericana; 2009	Succeeded by (Venezuela) Caroline Medina
Preceded by (South Africa) Tatum Keshwar	Miss World 2nd Runner-Up; 2010	Succeeded by (Puerto Rico) Amanda Vilanova
Preceded by María Milagros Véliz	Miss World Venezuela; 2009	Succeeded by Ivian Sarcos
Preceded by Gabriela Fernández	Miss Zulia; 2009	Succeeded by Estefani Carolina Araujo
