= Supranational Venezuela 2019 =

1st Supranational Venezuela pageant

- Date: August 22, 2019
- Presenters: Leo Aldana; Rosangélica Monasterio; Franklin Salomón; Irrael Gómez
- Entertainment: Guaco; El Encuentro
- Venue: Chacao Cultural Center, Caracas, Venezuela
- Broadcaster: International: DirecTV; Official broadcaster: Globovisión
- Entrants: 30
- Placements: 15
- Winner: Gabriela de la Cruz; Carabobo; Leonardo Carrero; Mérida

Supranational Venezuela 2019 was the first Supranational Venezuela pageant. It was held at the Chacao Cultural Center in Caracas, Venezuela on August 22, 2019.

At the end of the event, Alyz Henrich, Miss Earth 2013 and Prince Julio César crowned Gabriela de la Cruz of Carabobo as Miss Supranational Venezuela 2019. She represented Venezuela at the Miss Supranational 2019 pageant placing as 4th runner-up.

Also, Leonardo Carrero of Mérida was appointed as Mister Supranational Venezuela 2019. He represented Venezuela at the Mister Supranational 2019 pageant placing as 4th runner-up.

== Background ==
Originally, since the creation of the Miss Supranational international pageant, the franchise holder in Venezuela was the Miss Venezuela Organization, which held its annual competition and designated Venezuela's representative for the competition. This occurred until 2018. Subsequently, in 2019, the franchise was awarded to the Venezuelan fashion designer, entrepreneur, fashion consultant, and lawyer, Prince Julio César, president of Miss Earth Venezuela.

== Pageant ==
=== Format ===
The inaugural edition of Miss Supranational Venezuela featured the same candidates who would later compete for the title of Miss Earth Venezuela 2019, which took place three days later, on August 25. In the case of Mister Supranational Venezuela, the title was designated by the same organization.

=== Selection committee ===
The judges for Miss Supranational Venezuela include:

- Gerizbel Rejón – KGC Hair president
- Moisés Garzón – Kravital president
- Prince Julio César – Miss Earth Venezuela Organization president
- Erick Boscán – Banco Plaza president
- Alexandra Muñoz – Fashion designer
- Andronico Valera – JHS Group vicepresident
- Laila Mohtar – Medical surgeon
- David Caraballo – Personal trainer
- Andreína Castro – Model, TV Host, Miss Aragua 2009 and Top 10 in Miss Venezuela 2009
- Tomás Seif – Dentist
- Veruska Ramírez – Mode, Miss Venezuela 1997 and 1st runner-up in Miss Universe 1998
- Romer Espinoza – Ivón vicepresident
- Nadia Mohtar – Medical surgeon
- Kevin Escobar – Navicu.com marketing director
- Mirla Castellanos – Singer
- José Torres – Mercadeo Viotto director
- Érika Guerero – Erika's Cosmetic president
- Jesús Morales – Stylist
- Ligia González – Dermatologist

== Results ==
=== Miss Supranational Venezuela ===
Color key

- Declared as winner
- Ended as runner-up or top 5/8 qualification
- Ended as one of the finalists or semifinalists

Placement	Contestant	International Placement
Miss Supranational Venezuela 2019	Carabobo – Gabriela de la Cruz	4th runner-up — Miss Supranational 2019
1st runner-up	Distrito Capital – Ivana Rodríguez	
2nd runner-up	Táchira – María Laura López	
Top 7	Aragua – Ana Daniela Mencía; Guárico – Michell Castellanos; Sucre – Mariángel Tovar; Trujillo – Thea Sichini	
Top 15	Anzoátegui – Paola Cultrera; Apure – Claudia Herrera; Bolívar – Stefany Rosales; Dependencias Federales – Graciela Altuve; Falcón – Albertling García; Lara – Gabriela Coronado; Miranda – Stephany Zreik; Portuguesa – Aleska Cordido	

=== Mister Supranational Venezuela ===
Placement	Contestant	International Placement
Mister Supranational Venezuela 2019	Mérida – Leonardo Carrero	4th runner-up — Mister Supranational 2019

== Contestants ==
30 contestants competed for the title.

No.	Contestant	Age (Note: Ages at the time of the pageant)	Height	Hometown
Amazonas	Fabiana de los Ángeles Sánchez Vicuña	24	1.74 m (5 ft 9 in)	Barquisimeto
Anzoátegui	Paola Andrea Rita Cultrera Palacios	25	1.75 m (5 ft 9 in)	Maracay
Apure	Claudia Valentina Herrera Olivares	26	1.75 m (5 ft 9 in)	San Fernando
Aragua	Ana Daniela Mencía Samuel	19	1.75 m (5 ft 9 in)	Valencia
Barinas	Andruina Betania Carrera Morales	22	1.75 m (5 ft 9 in)	Los Teques
Bolívar	Stefany Jholeidy Rosales Salas	24	1.74 m (5 ft 9 in)	Caracas
Canaima	Roxelis Beatriz Mendoza López	22	1.68 m (5 ft 6 in)	Lagunillas
Carabobo	Gabriela Isabel de la Cruz Brito	19	1.74 m (5 ft 9 in)	San Felipe
Cojedes	Dianny Isabel Burrofatto Rodríguez	24	1.68 m (5 ft 6 in)	Carupano
Costa Oriental	Anorly del Valle Casanova Rivero	20	1.78 m (5 ft 10 in)	Cabimas
Delta Amacuro	Andrea Valentina Lezama Cabello	25	1.72 m (5 ft 8 in)	El Tigre
Dependencias Federales	Graciela Carolina Altuve Mendoza	22	1.75 m (5 ft 9 in)	Los Teques
Distrito Capital	Ivana Rafaela Rodríguez Diab	21	1.66 m (5 ft 5 in)	Caracas
Falcón	Albertling Clementina García Rojas	20	1.72 m (5 ft 8 in)	Caracas
Guárico	Michell Roxana Castellanos Azuaje	25	1.70 m (5 ft 7 in)	Barquisimeto
Lara	Joanny Gabriela Coronado Flores	23	1.75 m (5 ft 9 in)	La Victoria
Mérida	Joskatry del Valle Veliz Marcano	20	1.72 m (5 ft 8 in)	Maturín
Miranda	Stephany Carina Zreik Torres	23	1.70 m (5 ft 7 in)	Valencia
Monagas	Andrea Danesska Cesín Martínez	20	1.70 m (5 ft 7 in)	San Antonio de Capayacuar
Nueva Esparta	Pierangela Estefani Noriega Domínguez	26	1.75 m (5 ft 9 in)	La Asunción
Península de Araya	Génesis Mariana Méndez Ríos	24	1.70 m (5 ft 7 in)	Caracas
Península Goajira	Georgina Fabiola Martínez Bracho	18	1.74 m (5 ft 9 in)	Maracaibo
Península de Paraguaná	María Victoria Marval Olivares	19	1.69 m (5 ft 7 in)	Cabimas
Portuguesa	Aleska Irina Cordido Useche	24	1.72 m (5 ft 8 in)	Acarigua
Sucre	Mariángel del Valle Barrios Tovar	20	1.76 m (5 ft 9 in)	Cumaná
Táchira	María Laura López Rueda	22	1.70 m (5 ft 7 in)	San Cristóbal
Trujillo	Thea Cleo Nice Sichini Comunian	24	1.77 m (5 ft 10 in)	Valencia
Vargas	Valeria Alexandra Alcalá López	23	1.75 m (5 ft 9 in)	Barcelona
Yaracuy	Bárbara Rodríguez Núñez	18	1.78 m (5 ft 10 in)	Valencia
Zulia	Denisse de los Ángeles Sánchez Adrianza	23	1.80 m (5 ft 11 in)	Maracaibo
