= Miss Venezuela 2006 =

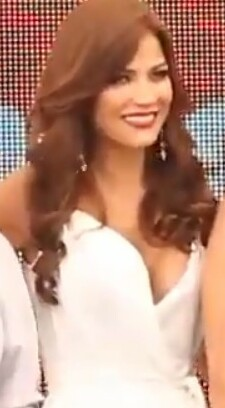
- Date: September 14, 2006
- Presenters: Daniel Sarcos; Maite Delgado; Gilberto Correa
- Entertainment: Olga Tañón; Gilberto Santa Rosa
- Venue: Poliedro de Caracas, Caracas, Venezuela
- Broadcaster: Venevision
- Entrants: 28
- Placements: 10
- Winner: Ly Jonaitis; Guárico
- Congeniality: Marygrey Quero (Costa Oriental)
- Photogenic: Bárbara Sánchez (Amazonas)
- Miss Internet: Joshil Morales (Aragua)

Miss Venezuela 2006 was the 53rd edition of the Miss Venezuela pageant, held on September 14, 2006, at the Poliedro de Caracas in Caracas. The event crowned Lidymar "Ly" Jonaitis of Guárico as Miss Venezuela 2006, with subsequent placements by Vanessa Peretti and Claudia Paola Suárez in international competitions.

== Background ==
The 2006 pageant returned to the Poliedro de Caracas under the artistic direction of Osmel Sousa, and was broadcast nationally by Venevisión. The live television special was hosted by the prominent presenting trio of Maite Delgado, Daniel Sarcos, and Gilberto Correa. To increase international interest, Italian fashion designer Roberto Cavalli served as a member of the celebrity judging panel, while the musical entertainment featured live performances by Puerto Rican pop stars Olga Tañón and Gilberto Santa Rosa.

Behind the scenes, the production faced a scheduling conflict because the international Miss World organization moved its 2006 finale to September in Poland, clashing directly with the timeline of the main Venezuelan pageant. To resolve this, the Miss Venezuela Organization held a separate, closed "snap" competition in July 2006 called Miss World Venezuela 2006. Federica Guzmán won that emergency title and departed for Poland immediately, which meant that Claudia Suárez—who won the official Miss World title at the main September event—had to wait a full year to compete in the Miss World 2007 cycle.

== Results ==
Miss Sucre 2006 was the first disabled candidate in the history of the pageant.

=== Placements ===
Placement	Contestant
Miss Venezuela 2006	Guárico – Lydimar Jonaitis
Miss Venezuela World 2006	Mérida – Claudia Paola Suárez
Miss Venezuela International 2006	Sucre – Vanessa Jackeline Peretti
1st Runner-Up	Miranda – Silvana Marando
2nd Runner-Up	Amazonas – Bárbara Sánchez
Top 10	Aragua – Joshil Morales; Carabobo – Mónica Pallota; Distrito Capital – Andreína Bruni; Nueva Esparta – Andreína Vilachá; Vargas – Patricia Jurado-Blanco

=== Special awards ===
- Miss Photogenic (voted by press reporters) - Bárbara Sánchez (Miss Amazonas)
- Miss Internet (voted by www.missvenezuela.com viewers) - Joshil Morales (Miss Aragua)
- Miss Congeniality (voted by Miss Venezuela contestants) - Marygrey Quero (Miss Costa Oriental)
- Miss Personality - Vanessa Peretti (Miss Sucre)
- Best Body - Andreina Bruni (Miss Distrito Capital)
- Best Smile - Silvana Marando (Miss Miranda)
- Miss Beauty - Ly Jonaitis (Miss Guárico)
- Miss Elegance - Claudia Suárez (Miss Mérida)
- Best Face - Ly Jonaitis (Miss Guárico)

== Contestants ==
The Miss Venezuela 2006 delegates were:

State	Contestant	Age	Height	Hometown
Amazonas	Jhomneidy de Jesús (Bárbara) Sánchez Romero	21	175 cm (5 ft 9 in)	El Tigre
Anzoátegui	Maryury Alejandra Suárez Hernández	21	178 cm (5 ft 10 in)	Altagracia de Orituco
Apure	Sofía Graciela Douzoglou Muñoz	17	176 cm (5 ft 9 1/2 in)	Maracay
Aragua	Joshil Valentina Morales Arenas	18	175 cm (5 ft 9 in)	Maracay
Barinas	Mabel Coromoto Ramírez Marcano	22	176 cm (5 ft 9 1/2 in)	Porlamar
Bolívar	Rina Candelaria Byer Ariza	18	172 cm (5 ft 7 1/2 in)	Ciudad Guayana
Canaima	Denisse Ortiz Pérez	18	177 cm (5 ft 9 1/2 in)	Caracas
Carabobo	Mónica Isabel Pallota Peña	19	175 cm (5 ft 9 in)	Valencia
Cojedes	Saelix Menisa Hernández Seijas	20	179 cm (5 ft 10 1/2 in)	Caracas
Costa Oriental	Marygrey Quero Rojas	25	175 cm (5 ft 9 in)	Cabimas
Delta Amacuro	Yasmín Terán Gutiérrez	25	181 cm (5 ft 11 1/2 in)	Caracas
Dependencias Federales	Marianne Vegas Brandt	24	183 cm (6 ft 0 in)	Caracas
Distrito Capital	María Andreina Bruni Puigbó	23	183 cm (6 ft 0 in)	Caracas
Falcón	Angie Lurey Velazco López	20	182 cm (5 ft 11 1/2 in)	Petare
Guárico	Lidymar Carolina Jonaitis Escalona	20	179 cm (5 ft 10 1/2 in)	Valencia
Lara	Aymar Alejandra Aristiguieta Herrera	22	170 cm (5 ft 7 in)	Barquisimeto
Mérida	Claudia Paola Suárez Fernández	19	179 cm (5 ft 10 1/2 in)	Mérida
Miranda	María Silvana Continanza Marando	19	173 cm (5 ft 8 in)	Chacao
Monagas	Francis Nohemí Lugo Golindano	18	177 cm (5 ft 9 1/2 in)	Maturín
Nueva Esparta	Andreina González Vilachá	21	175 cm (5 ft 9 in)	Porlamar
Península Goajira	Zaida Josefina Arellano Alvarez	20	180 cm (5 ft 11 in)	Maracaibo
Portuguesa	Rosa Elisa Martínez Gerig	22	172 cm (5 ft 7 1/2 in)	El Tigre
Sucre	Vanessa Jacqueline Gómez Peretti	20	179 cm (5 ft 10 1/2 in)	Cumaná
Táchira	Chiquinquirá (Chiqui) Montiel	18	176 cm (5 ft 9 1/2 in)	San Cristóbal
Trujillo	María Daniela Torrealba Pacheco	18	173 cm (5 ft 8 in)	San Cristóbal
Vargas	Patricia Jurado-Blanco Ganem	20	172 cm (5 ft 7 1/2 in)	Caracas
Yaracuy	Sara Johanna Angelini Giacche	18	175 cm (5 ft 9 in)	Valencia
Zulia	Paola Andreína Gómez Gudiño	18	180 cm (5 ft 11 in)	Maracaibo

Notes

- Ly Jonaitis placed as 2nd runner-up in Miss Universe 2007 in Mexico City, Mexico and Miss Interamericana 2008 in Dominican Republic
- Claudia Suárez placed as semifinalist in Miss World 2007 in Sanya, China. She also placed as 2nd runner up in Miss Atlántico Internacional 2008 in Punta del Este, Uruguay.
- Vanessa Peretti placed as semifinalist in Miss International 2007 in Tokyo, Japan. Peretti was the first deaf woman to compete in the Miss Venezuela pageant. She competed in Miss International 2007 on October 15 in Japan against another deaf woman, Sophie Vouzelaud from France. Peretti classified in Top 15 semifinalists. It is the first time in the history of Miss International that two deaf contestants participated in the event.
- Silvana Marando placed as a semifinalist in Miss Italia Nel Mondo 2010 pageant, held in Jesolo, Italy.
- Mónica Pallotta placed as semifinalist in Top Model of the World 2006 in Kunming, China. She previously placed as semifinalist in Miss Italia Nel Mondo 2005 in Salsomaggiore, Italy.
- Francis Lugo placed as 1st runner up in Miss Continente Americano 2007 in Guayaquil, Ecuador.
- María Daniela Torrealba placed as finalist in Miss Earth 2008 in Pampanga, Philippines.
- Patricia Jurado-Blanco placed as finalist in Miss Global Beauty Queen 2007 in Ningbo, China.
- Sara Angelini placed as a semifinalist in Miss Italia Nel Mondo 2010 pageant, held in Jesolo, Italy.
