= Shirley Varnagy =

- Born: Shirley Varnagy Bronfenmajer; February 1, 1982 (age 44); Caracas, Venezuela
- Other name: Shirley Varnagy
- Education: Universidad Católica Andrés Bello
- Occupations: Radio personality, television host, producer, journalist
- Years active: 2007–present
- Known for: Shirley
- Children: 2
- Website: www.shirleyvarnagy.com

Shirley Varnagy Bronfenmajer (born February 1, 1982, in Caracas) is a Venezuelan journalist, writer and television and radio presenter of Jewish origin.

== Biography ==
Varnagy was born into a Hungarian Jewish family. Her grandparents were survivors of the Holocaust, including one who was imprisoned in the Mauthausen Concentration Camp. She completed her Social Communication studies at the Andrés Bello Catholic University, where she graduated with honours. Her first job in the media was as a news anchorwoman for Planeta FM, and later as the producer for Gladys Rodríguez's show on Circuito X FM; later she worked as a producer for the Venezuelan TV news channel Globovisión, which they gave her the opportunity to cover well-known journalists like Carla Angola in the primetime show "Buenas Noches". In television, Varnagy has worked not only for Globovisión, but also for the extinct RCTV. On March 6, 2015, she became a mother for the second time, in this occasion of a girl, which has been named Naomi.

== Censorship and departure from Globovisión ==
On April 30, 2014, she quit Globovisión, after the transmission of her program, Shirley, was cut during an interview to the Peruvian writer Mario Vargas Llosa, a harsh critic of the politics of the Venezuelan presidents Hugo Chávez and Nicolás Maduro, following a question that Varnagy asked the 2010 recipient of the Nobel Prize in relation to his opinion regarding the politics applied by the government of Venezuela. Varnagy described the interruption of the transmission of her show as "self-censorship" from the Board of the television channel. Eventually, the transmission of the entire interview was done through alternative means in different social networks.

== Activities after Globovisión and return to TV ==
In November 2014, Varnagy publishes her first book, El Periodismo continúa, in which she reflects her impressions of the interviews made in her program Shirley until she left Globovisión. Later, in January 2015, Varnagy began to host #ShirleyRadio, a radio show with interviews and music on the Éxitos radio network, part of the Venezuelan radio network Unión Radio. In March 2016, Shirley Varnagy returns to television, hosting on the cable channel Venevisión Plus, her show Shirley, interviewing Venezuelan and foreign personalities and entertainers.
