= Jéssica Guillén =

Venezuelan beauty pageant titleholder (born 1985)

- Born: Jéssica Adriana Guillén Blanco; March 27, 1985 (age 41); Caracas, Venezuela
- Height: 1.77 m (5 ft 9 1/2 in)
- Beauty pageant titleholder
- Hair color: Black
- Eye color: Black
- Major competitions: Miss Venezuela 2009 (2nd Runner-Up); Miss Atlantico Internacional 2010 (Winner)

Jéssica Adriana Guillén Blanco (born March 27, 1985, in Caracas, Venezuela) is a Venezuelan beauty pageant titleholder who represented Amazonas in Miss Venezuela 2009, on September 24, 2009, and won the title of 2nd runner up. Guillén also competed in Chica E! Venezuela 2008 pageant on August 7, 2008, in Caracas, Venezuela.

She won the Miss Atlantico Internacional 2010 pageant ("Miss Atlantic International"), in Punta del Este (Uruguay), on January 23, 2010.

Preceded by -	Miss Atlantico Venezuela; 2009	Succeeded by Andrea Vásquez
Preceded by Eliana Quinteros	Miss Atlántico Internacional; 2010	Succeeded by Incumbent
