= Miss Venezuela 2008 =

South American beauty pageant

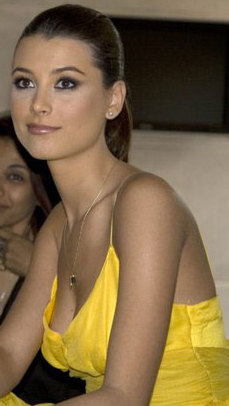
- Date: September 10, 2008
- Presenters: Daniel Sarcos; Maite Delgado
- Entertainment: David Bisbal, Oscar D'León, Wisin & Yandel
- Venue: Poliedro de Caracas, Caracas
- Broadcaster: Venevisión
- Entrants: 28
- Placements: 10
- Winner: Stefanía Fernández; Trujillo

Miss Venezuela 2008 was the 55th Miss Venezuela pageant, held at the Poliedro de Caracas in Caracas, Venezuela, on September 10, 2008.

Dayana Mendoza of Amazonas crowned Stefania Fernández of Trujillo as her successor at the end of the event.

On July 29, Osmel Sousa assumed further control of the selection process by directly appointing the 28 final contestants from a pool of 73 candidates. Although winners of regional and state contests have never been guaranteed participation in the final Miss Venezuela pageant, this direct selection resulted in the unprecedented elimination of the representatives of Falcón, Lara, Sucre, Vargas and Nueva Esparta. In addition to the two aforementioned titleholders from Zulia, a total of seven state winners were consequently stripped of their titles, which will be carried in the final pageant by other candidates.

== Contestants ==
| State | Contestant | Age | Height | Hometown |
|---|---|---|---|---|
| Amazonas | Elia Karina Rivero Molnár | 22 | 176 cm (5 ft 9 1/2 in) | Valera |
| Anzoátegui | María Milagros Véliz Pinto | 22 | 178 cm (5 ft 10 in) | Guacara |
| Apure | Adahisa Peña Arteaga | 25 | 176 cm (5 ft 9 1/2 in) | Valencia |
| Aragua | Ligia Elena Hernández Frías | 23 | 177 cm (5 ft 9 1/2 in) | Maracay |
| Barinas | Yoselis María (Yosy) Meléndez Medina | 22 | 180 cm (5 ft 11 in) | Guatire |
| Bolívar | Kenia Barreto González | 19 | 174 cm (5 ft 8 1/2 in) | Ciudad Guayana |
| Canaima | Estefanía de los Angeles Guzmán Cuenca | 18 | 176 cm (5 ft 9 1/2 in) | Cabimas |
| Carabobo | Gabriela Nidioska Concepción Guzmán | 18 | 180 cm (5 ft 11 in) | Puerto Cabello |
| Cojedes | Jorelys Gabriela Quintana Pozo | 20 | 176 cm (5 ft 9 1/2 in) | San Cristóbal |
| Delta Amacuro | Nathaly Andreína Navas Pérez | 21 | 173 cm (5 ft 8 in) | Caracas |
| Dependencias Federales | Dayana Andreína Borges Mora | 18 | 181 cm (5 ft 11 1/2 in) | Cagua |
| Distrito Capital | María Lourdes Caldera Méndez | 25 | 172 cm (5 ft 7 1/2 in) | Caracas |
| Falcón | Fanny Domingues Da Assuncao | 19 | 185 cm (6 ft 1 in) | Caracas |
| Guárico | Hildaly Dellanira Domínguez Núñez | 21 | 174 cm (5 ft 8 1/2 in) | Caracas |
| Lara | Nusat del Valle Durán Pérez | 20 | 177 cm (5 ft 9 1/2 in) | Tovar |
| Mérida | Alejandra Suan Sánchez Guerrero | 19 | 178 cm (5 ft 10 in) | Mérida |
| Miranda | Viviana Lisbeth Ramos Puma | 18 | 172 cm (5 ft 7 1/2 in) | Guanare |
| Monagas | Laksmi Rodríguez de la Sierra Solórzano | 22 | 178 cm (5 ft 10 in) | San Cristóbal |
| Nueva Esparta | Natascha Alexandra Brandt Rodríguez | 19 | 176 cm (5 ft 9 1/2 in) | Caracas |
| Península de Araya | Charyl Marlyz Chacón Ramírez | 23 | 175 cm (5 ft 9 in) | Maracay |
| Península de Paraguaná | María Alessandra Villegas Azpúrua | 21 | 174 cm (5 ft 8 1/2 in) | Caracas |
| Portuguesa | Verónica Susana Arcay Andrade | 20 | 171 cm (5 ft 7 1/2 in) | Valencia |
| Sucre | Natasha Alexandra Domínguez Boscán | 18 | 173 cm (5 ft 8 in) | Caracas |
| Táchira | Jennipher Katherine Bortolas Vargas | 17 | 175 cm (5 ft 9 in) | San Cristóbal |
| Trujillo | Stefanía Fernández Krupij | 18 | 182 cm (5 ft 11 1/2 in) | Mérida |
| Vargas | Marielis del Valle Ontiveros González | 20 | 181 cm (5 ft 11 1/2 in) | Caracas |
| Yaracuy | Tiffany Denise Andrade Roche | 19 | 178 cm (5 ft 10 in) | Caracas |
| Zulia | Gabriela Alexandra Fernández Ocanto | 22 | 174 cm (5 ft 8 1/2 in) | Maracaibo |

Notes

- Stefanía Fernández won the 2009 Miss Universe pageant in Nassau, Bahamas, marking the first time that a country won two times in a row.
- Laksmi Rodríguez placed as Semifinalist in Miss International 2009 in Chengdu, China. She also competed in Miss Supranational 2010 in Płock, Poland, when she placed as Semifinalist.
- Gabriela Concepción placed as 1st runner-up in Top Model of The World 2010 in Dortmund, Germany. and semifinalist the Miss Continente Americano 2010
- Ligia Hernández placed as 4th runner-up in Reina Hispanoamericana 2008 in Santa Cruz de la Sierra, Bolivia.
- Natasha Domínguez placed as 2nd runner-up in Reinado Internacional del Café 2009 in Manizales, Colombia.
- Viviana Ramos previously won Miss Globe International 2006 in Saranda, Albania.
