= María de Luz Da Silva =

Venezuelan model (born 1990)

María De Luz Da Silva
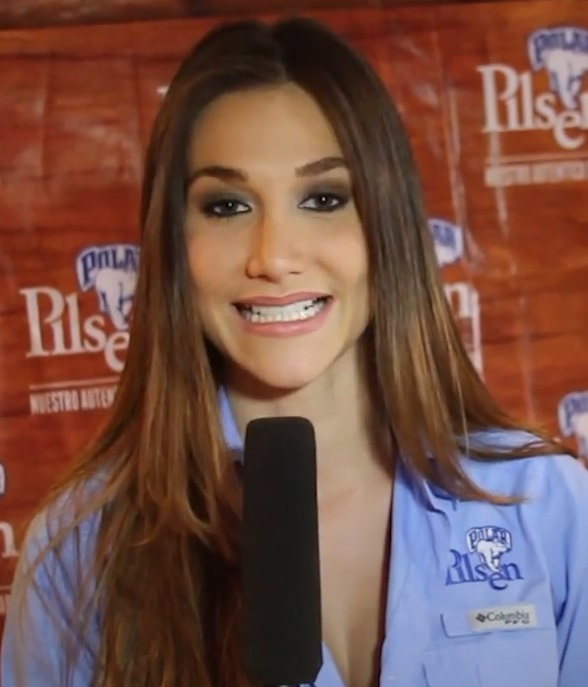
- Born: María De Luz Da Silva Dos Santos; May 10, 1990 (age 36); Maracay, Aragua, Venezuela
- Height: 1.79 m (5 ft 10 1/2 in)
- Beauty pageant titleholder
- Hair color: Dark blonde
- Eye color: Green
- Major competitions: Miss Venezuela 2009 (Top 10); Miss Friendship International 2009 (Top 15)

María De Luz Da Silva Dos Santos (May 10, 1990) is a Miss Personality and Miss Photogenic award-winning model. She represented Mérida state in the Miss Venezuela 2009 pageant on September 24, 2009, and placed in the top 10 semi-finalists. Da Silva currently studies international trade at the Simón Bolívar University in Caracas, Venezuela.

== Career ==
Da Silva was a semi-finalist in the Miss Mérida pageant in 2009. She participated in competitions such as the Miss Friendship International 2009, in Wuhan, China, on November 7, 2009. She was ranked among the top 15 semi-finalists, where she won as Miss Perfect Forms, representing Venezuela.
