= Jessica de Abreu =

Venezuelan model

Jessica De Abreu
- Born: Jessica De Abreu; Caracas, Venezuela
- Height: 1.76 m (5 ft 9 1/2 in)
- Beauty pageant titleholder
- Hair color: Blonde
- Eye color: Blue

Jessica De Abreu is a Venezuelan model and beauty pageant titleholder. She represented Apure state in the 2007 Miss Venezuela pageant.
