= Tiffany Andrade =

Venezuelan model

Tiffany Andrade Roche
- Born: Tiffany Denise Andrade Roche; February 11, 1989 (age 37); Caracas, Venezuela
- Height: 1.78 m (5 ft 10 in)
- Beauty pageant titleholder
- Hair color: Black
- Eye color: Brown

Tiffany Denise Andrade Roche (born in Caracas, Venezuela 11 February 1989) was a Venezuelan beauty pageant contestant. She was a contestant in the Ford Models "Supermodel of Venezuela 2007" pageant held in Caracas on November 22, 2007. Andrade represented Yaracuy state in the Miss Venezuela 2008 pageant on September 10, 2008.
