= Charyl Chacón =

- Born: Charyl Marlyz Chacón Ramírez; July 5, 1985 (age 41); Lima, Peru
- Height: 1.75 m (5 ft 9 in)
- Beauty pageant titleholder
- Hair color: Brown
- Eye color: Brown

Charyl Marlyz Chacón Ramírez is a pageant titleholder, was born in Lima, Peru on July 5, 1985, and grew up in Maracay, Aragua state, Venezuela. She was the official winner of the Señorita Deporte Venezuela 2007 (Miss Sports Venezuela) pageant held in Caracas, Venezuela on August 15, 2007. Chacón represented the Araya Peninsula in the Miss Venezuela 2008 pageant, on September 10, 2008.

Currently, she co-hosts the morning variety show La Bomba on Televen.
