= Natascha Brandt =

Venezuelan model

- Born: Natascha Alexandra Brandt Rodríguez; May 13, 1989 (age 37); Caracas, Venezuela
- Height: 1.76 m (5 ft 9 in)
- Beauty pageant titleholder
- Title: Señorita Deporte Venezuela 2006 (Winner); Miss Venezuela 2008
- Hair color: Brown
- Eye color: Black

Natascha Alexandra Brandt Rodríguez is a pageant titleholder, born in Caracas, Venezuela on May 13, 1989. She was the official winner of the Señorita Deporte Venezuela 2006 (Miss Sports Venezuela) pageant held in Caracas, Venezuela on August 8, 2006. Brandt represented the Nueva Esparta state in the Miss Venezuela 2008 pageant, on September 10, 2008. Many people in the country says she is expected to become an international top model
