= María Lourdes Caldera =

Venezuelan model

- Born: María Lourdes Caldera Méndez; January 24, 1983 (age 43); Maracaibo, Venezuela
- Height: 1.72 m (5 ft 8 in)
- Beauty pageant titleholder
- Hair color: Brown
- Eye color: Brown

María Lourdes Caldera Méndez is a pageant titleholder, was born in Maracaibo, Venezuela on January 24, 1983, and grew up in Caracas, Venezuela. She is the Miss Turismo Venezuela (Miss Tourism Venezuela) titleholder for 2007, and was the official representative of Venezuela to the Miss Tourism Queen International pageant held in Zhengzhou, China on April 10, 2008; when she won the Best Evening Gown award. She was represented the Distrito Capital in the Miss Venezuela 2008 pageant, on September 10, 2008, but unplaced.
