= Hildaly Domínguez =

Venezuelan model

- Born: Hildaly Dellanira Domínguez Núñez; March 27, 1987 (age 39); Guárico, Venezuela
- Height: 1.74 m (5 ft 9 in)
- Beauty pageant titleholder
- Hair color: Brown
- Eye color: Hazel

Hildaly Dellanira Domínguez Núñez, is a pageant titleholder from Guárico, Venezuela who competed in the Miss Venezuela 2008 pageant on September 10, 2008.

Domínguez won the Miss Guárico 2008 title in a state pageant held in San Juan de los Morros, Venezuela on 5 April 2008.
