= Adahisa Peña =

Venezuelan pageant titleholder

- Born: Adahisa Peña Arteaga; August 6, 1984 (age 42); Valencia, Venezuela
- Height: 1.79 m (5 ft 10 in)
- Beauty pageant titleholder
- Hair color: Brown
- Eye color: Hazel

Adahisa Peña Arteaga (born August 6, 1984) is a pageant titleholder, born in Valencia, Venezuela. She was represented of the Apure state in the Miss Venezuela 2008 pageant, on September 10, 2008, and won the Miss Congeniality award and proceeded to represent Venezuela in multiple International contests. Peña once considered one of Venezuelan's top fashion models, participating in International Runways for designers such as Tommy Hilfiger, Angel Sanchez, and Carolina Herrera among others; is currently based in the US where she continues her career participating in multiple projects as a sports and entertainment TV host.
