= Miss Venezuela 2007 =

54th edition of the Miss Venezuela competition

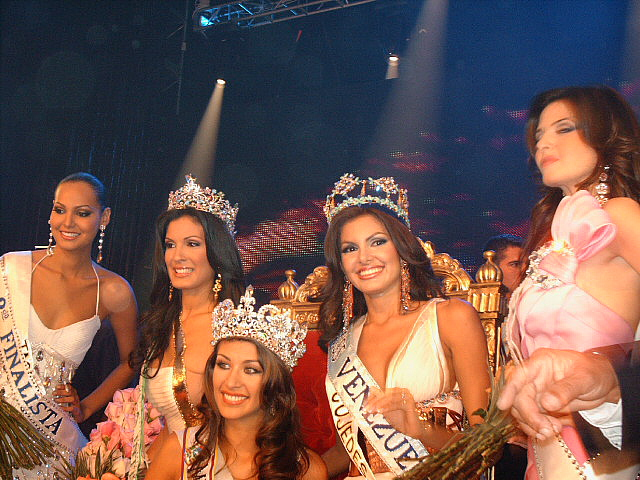
- The winners of Miss Venezuela 2007
- Date: September 13, 2007
- Presenters: Daniel Sarcos; Maite Delgado
- Entertainment: Kudai; Hany Kauam; Chino; Nacho
- Venue: Poliedro de Caracas, Caracas
- Broadcaster: Venevisión
- Entrants: 28
- Placements: 10
- Winner: Dayana Mendoza; Amazonas
- Congeniality: Kelly García (Península Goajira)

Miss Venezuela 2007 was the 54th Miss Venezuela pageant, held at the Poliedro de Caracas in Caracas, Venezuela, on September 13, 2007. The ceremony was designed to look more elaborate.

Lydimar Carolina Jonaitis of Guárico crowned Dayana Sabrina Mendoza of Amazonas as her successor at the end of the event.

== Results ==
=== Placements ===
Placement	Contestant
Miss Venezuela 2007	Amazonas – Dayana Mendoza
Miss Venezuela World 2007	Cojedes – Hannelly Quintero
Miss Venezuela International 2007	Carabobo – Dayana Colmenares
1st Runner-Up	Aragua – Mónica Besereni
2nd Runner-Up	Táchira – Alexandra Serrano
Top 10	Barinas – Yohany Calderón; Miranda – Myriam Abreu; Sucre – Andrea Matthies; Trujillo – Luna Ramos; Vargas – Anyelika Pérez

=== Special awards ===
- Miss Photogenic (voted by press reporters) - Hannelly Quintero (Cojedes)
- Miss Internet (voted by www.missvenezuela.com viewers) - Mónica Besereni (Aragua)
- Miss Congeniality (voted by Miss Venezuela contestants) - Kelly García (Península Goajira)
- Miss Personality - Anyelika Pérez (Vargas)
- Best Body - Luna Ramos (Trujillo)
- Best Smile - Andrea Matthies (Sucre)
- Miss Integral - Dayana Mendoza (Amazonas)
- Miss Beauty - Hannelly Quintero (Cojedes)
- Best Legs - Andreína Ellington (Distrito Capital)
- Miss Elegance - Luna Ramos (Trujillo)
- Best Face - Mónica Besereni (Aragua)

== Pageant ==
=== Selection committee ===
==== Final telecast ====
- Carmen María Montiel - Miss Venezuela 1984
- Christophe Didier - Delta Air Lines Latin American Vice President
- Daniela Kosán - Miss Venezuela International 1997 and E! News Latinamerica Host and model
- Carlos Dorado - Casablanca Store President
- María Cristina Rivero Capriles - Fashion designer
- Valfrido A.N. Menezes - Brazilian Fashion Stylist
- Alirio Noguera - Businessman
- Nakary Molina - Model and Miss Táchira 2006 contestant
- Carlos Croes - Multinacional de Seguros Market Vice-President
- Noura Al Gabandi - Kuwait ambassador's wife
- José Guillermo Ramos - Ebel Paris General Director
- Ivanova Clement - Escada Director in Venezuela
- Daniela di Giacomo - Miss International 2006
- Julio César Reyes - Mayor of Barinas City
- Alejandra Espinoza - Nuestra Belleza Latina 2007 from México
- Anarella Bono - Miss Anzoátegui 1997 TV Host and model
- Larry Hernández - Movistar Venezuela Advertising and Communications Executive Director
- Patricia Azócar - Exclusiva magazine president
- Elizabeth Cuenca - Entre Socios General Director and Editor
- Ricardo Aldama - Rex Fabrics President from Miami
- John Losada - Machado, García, Serra Communications from Miami Vice-President
- Mayra de Belloso - Latin-American Representative of The Gem Palace
- Ying Juan Tei - Artistic Adviser of the Cultural Association of Beijing
- Luisa Lucchi - Lucchi Shoes president
- Milena Portillo - Businesswoman
- María Eugenia Maldonado - LG Electronics Product Manager

== Contestants ==
The Miss Venezuela 2007 delegates are:

State	Contestant	Age	Height	Hometown
Amazonas	Dayana Sabrina Mendoza Moncada	21	178 cm (5 ft 10 in)	Caracas
Anzoátegui	María Victoria Ortiz Pérez	17	178 cm (5 ft 10 in)	Santa Elena de Uairén
Apure	Jéssica de Abreu Faría	17	172 cm (5 ft 7 1/2 in)	Caracas
Aragua	Mónica Suset Bsereni Hadad	21	171 cm (5 ft 7 1/2 in)	Maracay
Barinas	Yohany del Carmen Calderón Huggins	22	174 cm (5 ft 8 1/2 in)	Maracaibo
Bolívar	Lucía Carolina Soto Albornoz	17	182 cm (5 ft 11 1/2 in)	Ciudad Bolívar
Canaima	Yelitza de los Angeles Rojas Piñango	23	181 cm (5 ft 11 1/2 in)	Caracas
Carabobo	Dayana Carolina Colmenares Bocchieri	22	177 cm (5 ft 9 1/2 in)	Maracay
Cojedes	Hannelly Zulami Quintero Ledezma	21	178 cm (5 ft 10 in)	Ocumare del Tuy
Costa Oriental	Rusthmely Dayana Soto Mujica	21	172 cm (5 ft 7 1/2 in)	Cabimas
Delta Amacuro	Arlis Leidimar Alvarado Benítez	21	179 cm (5 ft 10 1/2 in)	Caracas
Dependencias Federales	Antonieta María Lugo Matheus	21	180 cm (5 ft 11 in)	Caracas
Distrito Capital	Andreína Elías Ellington	21	180 cm (5 ft 11 in)	Caracas
Falcón	Lisbeth del Carmen Reyes Gavidia	21	177 cm (5 ft 9 1/2 in)	Punto Fijo
Guárico	Betzabeth Mariely Osorio Boyer	18	178 cm (5 ft 10 in)	Altagracia de Orituco
Lara	María Gabriela Garmendia Sandoval	21	175 cm (5 ft 9 in)	Barquisimeto
Mérida	Yorly Andreína Padilla Urbina	21	178 cm (5 ft 10 in)	San Cristóbal
Miranda	Myriam Janeth Abreu Medina	20	173 cm (5 ft 8 in)	Caracas
Monagas	Nuritza Carolina Idrogo Siegler	20	174 cm (5 ft 8 1/2 in)	Maturín
Nueva Esparta	Josephine Karam León	23	173 cm (5 ft 8 in)	Porlamar
Península Goajira	Kellyn Celeste García Alviarez	19	172 cm (5 ft 7 1/2 in)	Barinas
Portuguesa	Vanessa Terracciano Uccellini	22	175 cm (5 ft 9 in)	Barquisimeto
Sucre	Andrea Valentina Matthies Bornhost	19	173 cm (5 ft 8 in)	Caracas
Táchira	Alexandra Serrano Gutiérrez	17	180 cm (5 ft 11 in)	San Cristóbal
Trujillo	Luneidis "Luna" Ramos Torres	20	178 cm (5 ft 10 in)	Caracas
Vargas	Anyelika Marians Franco Pérez Jiménez	19	177 cm (5 ft 9 1/2 in)	Caracas
Yaracuy	Iselmar Antonietta Burgos Reyes	19	172 cm (5 ft 7 1/2 in)	Barinas
Zulia	Laura Andreína Montero Ferrer	19	174 cm (5 ft 8 1/2 in)	Maracaibo

Notes

- Dayana Mendoza won Miss Universe 2008 in Nha Trang, Vietnam.
- Hannelly Quintero placed as semifinalist in Miss World 2008 in Johannesburg, South Africa, when she won the Miss World Americas title. She also competed in Reina Hispanoamericana 2007 in Santa Cruz, Bolivia, when she placed in the Top 5. She won the Miss Intercontinental 2009 pageant, in Minsk, Belarus.
- Dayana Colmenares placed as semifinalist in Miss International 2008 in Macau, China. She previously placed as 2nd runner up in Miss Continente Americano 2006 in Guayaquil, Ecuador.
- Mónica Bsereni placed as 2nd runner-up in Reinado Internacional del Café 2008 in Manizales, Colombia.
- Anyélika Pérez placed as semifinalist in Top Model of the World 2008 in Hurghada, Egypt.
- Andrea Matthies placed as finalist in Miss Continente Americano 2008 in Guayaquil, Ecuador.
- Josephine Karam won International Queen of Banana 2009 in Machala, Ecuador.
- Iselmar Burgos placed as semifinalist in Miss Intercontinental 2007 in Mahé, Seychelles.
- María Gabriela Garmendia placed as 3rd runner-up in Miss Intercontinental 2008 in Zabrze, Poland.
- Kellyn García won Sambil Model Venezuela 2011.
- Myriam Abreu won Miss Tourism Intercontinental 2010 in Miri, Malaysia.
- Luna Ramos placed as 2nd runner-up in Miss Bikini International 2010 in Sanya, China; and won Miss World Next Top Model 2010, in Beirut, Lebanon.
- When the hosts were presenting Anarella Bono as a Judge, she was booed by the audience for supporting the government of the President Hugo Chávez.
- At the end of the Miss Venezuela 2007 pageant after the two winners were crowned, a man named Yendri Sánchez among the audience rushed on the stage and grabbed the crown from Hannelys. He then jumped on top of the queen's throne where the stage crew caught him. They immediately dragged him off the stage. Meanwhile, the cameras were focusing on Dayana's winning walk and the two hosts kept with the program.
