= Sophie Vouzelaud =

French model (born 1987)

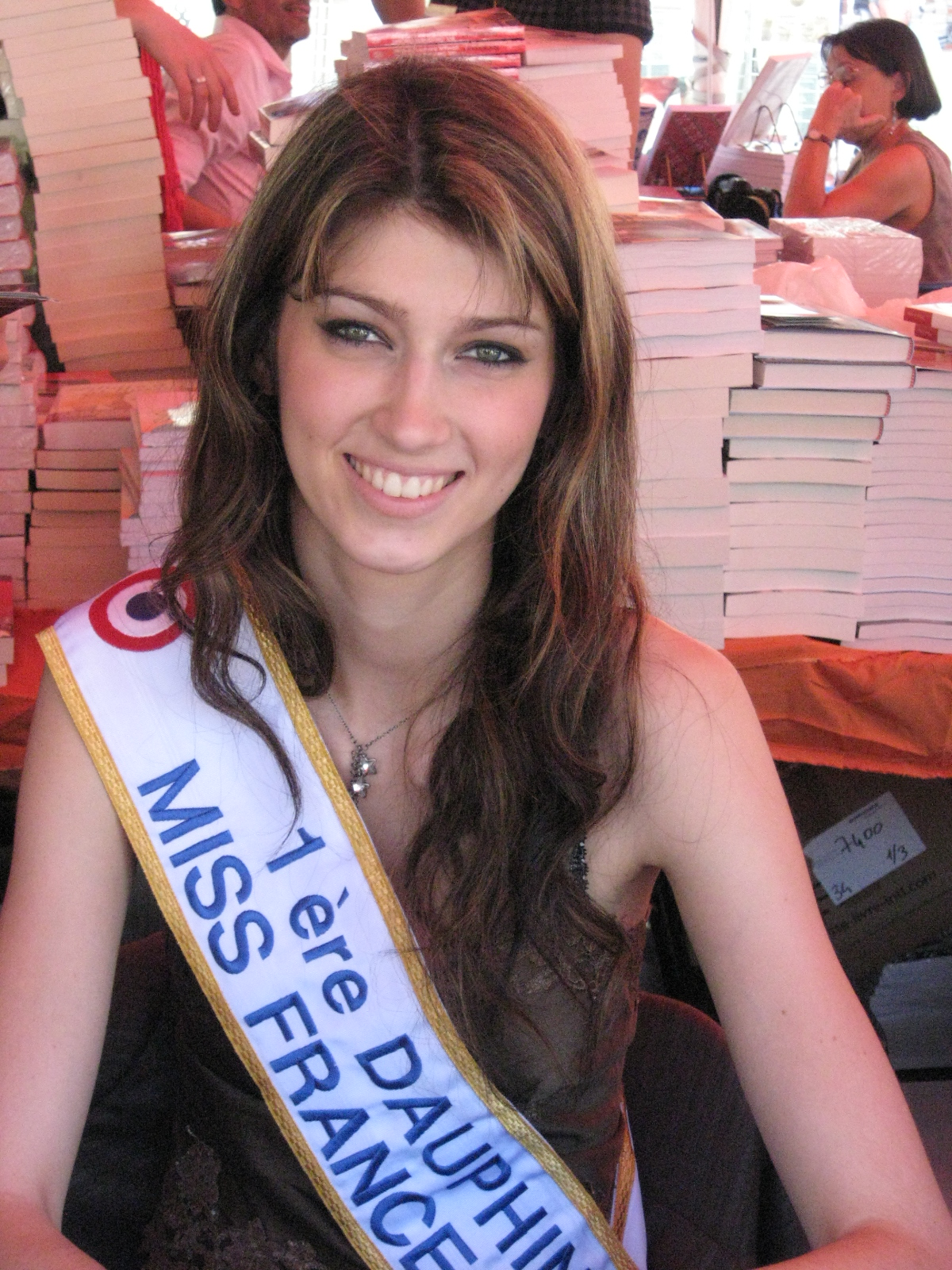
- Born: Sophie Vouzelaud; June 21, 1987 (age 39); Saint-Junien, Limousin, France
- Height: 1.80 m (5 ft 11 in)
- Website: missfrance.tf1.fr/portrait_19.html

Sophie Vouzelaud (born June 21, 1987) is a French model and beauty pageant titleholder who was elected first runner-up in the 2007 Miss France pageant. She represented the region of Limousin.

Vouzelaud was born in Saint-Junien, Haute-Vienne. She was born deaf. She is the first deaf or hard of hearing person to participate in the finals of a Miss France pageant. She communicates with French sign language (LSF) but was adamant in speaking at the finals. She is currently pursuing a Bachelor's degree in accounting.

According to Geneviève de Fontenay, Vouzelaud had a comfortable lead in the French public's votes. Ultimately however, the jury's vote—comprising two-thirds of the final score—elected finalist, Rachel Legrain-Trapani as Miss France 2007 who thus won by a single vote of the jury.

Vouzelaud requested—backed by the elected Miss France 2007 Rachel Legrain-Trapani—to represent France at the Miss World pageant to increase awareness and exposure of deaf people. The organizers refused, stating that they only accept the official winner of the country as a competitor.

Vouzelaud then went on to compete in Miss International 2007 on October 15 of that year in Japan against another deaf person, Vanessa Peretti from Venezuela. Peretti qualified for the Top 15, but Vouzelaud did not.

== Filmography ==
Year	Title	Role	Director	Notes
2010	L'amour, c'est mieux à deux	Hélène	Dominique Farrugia & Arnaud Lemort	
