= Aymar Aristiguieta =

Venezuelan model and pageant titleholder (born 1983)

- Born: Aymar Alejandra Aristiguieta Herrera; November 1983 (age 42); Valencia, Venezuela
- Height: 1.70 m (5 ft 7 in)
- Beauty pageant titleholder
- Hair color: Brown
- Eye color: Brown

Aymar Aristiguieta (born 1983) is a Venezuelan model and beauty pageant titleholder who represented the state of Lara in the Miss Venezuela 2006 pageant, on September 14, 2006.
