= Ligia Hernández =

Pageant titleholder

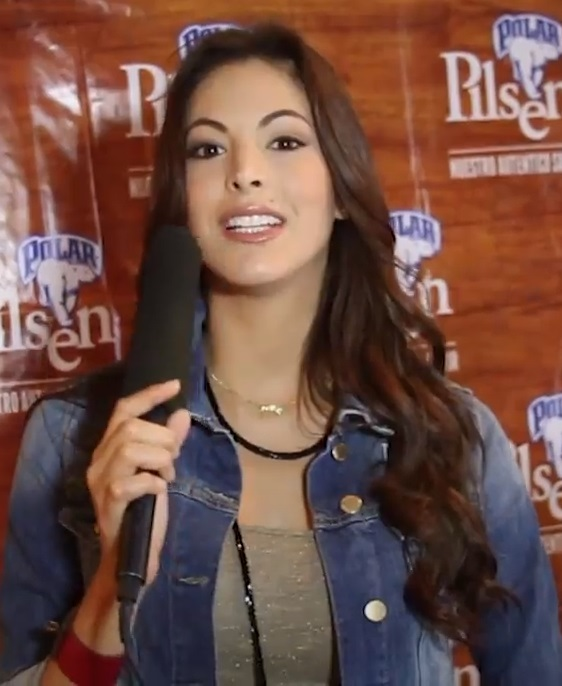
- Born: Ligia Elena Hernández Frías; April 5, 1985 (age 41); Punto Fijo, Venezuela
- Height: 1.77 m (5 ft 10 in)
- Beauty pageant titleholder
- Hair color: Brown
- Eye color: Brown

Ligia Elena Hernández Frías (born April 5, 1985 in Punto Fijo, Venezuela, and grew up in Maracay, Venezuela), is a pageant titleholder. She was represented the Aragua state in the Miss Venezuela 2008 pageant, on September 10, 2008, and placed in the ten semifinalists.

She represented Venezuela in the 2008 Reina Hispanoamericana pageant, in Santa Cruz, Bolivia, on October 30, 2008, and won the title of 4th runner up. She also won the special prizes of Miss Photogenic and Miss Elegance.
