= Daniela Morales =

Venezuelan model (born 1988)

- Born: Daniela del Carmen Morales Verde; May 11, 1988 (age 38); Cumaná, Venezuela
- Height: 1.75 m (5 ft 9 in)
- Beauty pageant titleholder
- Hair color: Blonde
- Eye color: Brown

Daniela del Carmen Morales Verde (born May 11, 1988, in Cumaná, Venezuela) is a Venezuelan model and a pageant titleholder who was represented Sucre state in the Miss Venezuela 2009 pageant on September 24, 2009. She is a Telecommunications engineer.

She entered in Teen Model Venezuela 2004, and placed 6th.
