= Verioska Velasco =

Venezuelan political journalist

- Born: Barquisimeto, Venezuela
- Occupation: Journalist
- Website: www.linkedin.com/in/verioska-velasco-557b7340/

Verioska Velasco is a Venezuelan political journalist best known for her TV research documentaries on widely publicized cases of political corruption at the highest judiciary levels in Venezuela. In 2003, she and her team endured noted harassment by pro-government militants during her coverage of opposition demonstrations in Barquisimeto and other cities. For several years (2004-2012), she occupied top positions within the research team at TV news outlet Globovisión. In 2013, she acted as an adviser to the claimers at the Inter-American Court of Human Rights in the indictment of the Venezuelan government for the alleged violation of the human rights of political prisoner Raúl José Díaz Peña. She later accompanied charity Juan Cuadrado foundation in Colombia. From 2015 to 2023 she became a private communications consultant to Mario Abdo Benítez along his career as a political leader and president of Paraguay. Having concluded this commitment in August 2023, Velasco is now enrolled as a student of the Executive Master's Program in Asia-Pacific and Latin American studies at Tamkang University, Taiwan.
