= Hannelly Quintero =

Venezuelan actress (born 1985)

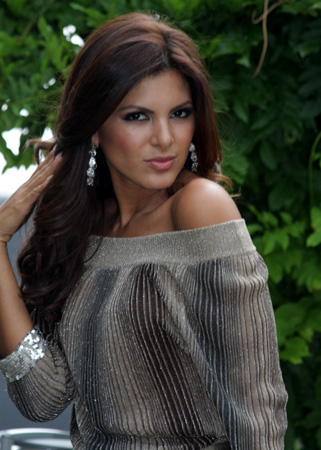
- Born: Hannelly Zulami Quintero Ledezma; November 22, 1985 (age 40); Ocumare del Tuy, Miranda, Venezuela
- Height: 1.78 m (5 ft 10 in)
- Beauty pageant titleholder
- Title: Miss Venezuela World 2007; Miss Intercontinental 2009
- Hair color: Black
- Eye color: Brown
- Major competitions: Miss Venezuela 2007 (Miss Venezuela World 2008); Reina Hispanoamericana 2007 (Top 8); Miss World 2008 (Top 15) (Miss World Americas); Miss Intercontinental 2009 (Winner)

Hannelly Zulami Quintero Ledezma (born November 22, 1985) is a Venezuelan actress, model, TV host and beauty pageant titleholder. She won Miss World Venezuela 2007 and Miss Intercontinental 2009. She competed in the Miss World 2008 beauty pageant, on December 13 in Johannesburg, South Africa, and ranked as one of the Top 15. Quintero also won the title of Miss World Americas.

Quintero, who stands 178 cm tall, competed in the national beauty pageant Miss Venezuela 2007 on September 13, 2007, and obtained the title of Miss World Venezuela. She won the special awards of "Miss Photogenic" and "Miss Beauty." She represented the state of Cojedes.

She also placed among the Top 8 in Reina Hispanoamericana 2007, held in Santa Cruz, Bolivia on October 26, 2007. Quintero also won the Miss Intercontinental 2009 pageant in Minsk (Belarus), on September 27, 2009.

Quintero arrived at the Venezuelan channel Televen in 2011, but it wasn't until 2013 that she joined the team of the TV show Vitrina, where she shares with former Miss Venezuela Ly Jonaitis, model and host Andrea Matthies, along with actor and host Leonardo Aldana and model Rosamaría Matteo.

Quintero is the host of Somos Talento in Venevisión.

Awards and achievements
Preceded by (Colombia) Cristina Lucia Camargo de la Rans	Miss Intercontinental; 2009	Succeeded by (Puerto Rico) Maydelise Columna
Preceded by (Mexico) Carolina Morán	Miss World Americas; 2008	Succeeded by (Mexico) Perla Beltrán
Preceded by Claudia Suárez (Mérida)	Miss World Venezuela; 2007	Succeeded by María Milagros Véliz (Anzoátegui)
