= Andreína Castro =

Venezuelan beauty queen and model

- Born: Andreína Vanessa Castro Martínez; 16 July 1991 (age 35); Maracay, Venezuela
- Height: 1.73 m (5 ft 8 in)
- Beauty pageant titleholder
- Title: Teen Model Venezuela 2007; Miss Tourism Universe 2010
- Hair color: Light Brown
- Eye color: Blue
- Major competitions: Teen Model Venezuela 2007 (Winner); Miss Venezuela 2009 (Top 10); Miss Tourism Universe 2010 (Winner)

Andreína Vanessa Castro Martínez (born 16 July 1991, Maracay) is a Venezuelan beauty queen and model. She was the winner of the Teen Model Venezuela 2007 pageant held in Caracas, Venezuela on August 20, 2007.

Castro represented the Aragua state in the Miss Venezuela 2009 pageant, on September 24, 2009, and placed in the 10 semifinalists. She studied Periodism.
