= Karina Rivero =

Venezuelan model

- Born: Elia Karina Rivero Molnar; October 20, 1985 (age 40); Valera, Venezuela
- Height: 1.76 m (5 ft 9 in)
- Beauty pageant titleholder
- Title: Elite Model Look Venezuela 2003; Miss Amazonas 2008
- Hair color: Brown
- Eye color: Brown
- Major competitions: Elite Model Look Venezuela 2003 (Winner); Elite Model Latino 2003 (1st Runner-Up); Miss Venezuela 2008 (Top 10)

Elia Karina Rivero Molnar (born October 20, 1985, in Valera, Venezuela) is a Venezuelan model and beauty pageant contestant. She was the Elite Model Look Venezuela winner for 2003 and was the official representative of Venezuela to the Elite Model Look International 2003 pageant held in Singapore on November 8, 2003. Rivero was also first runner up in the Elite Model Latino 2003 pageant held in May, 2003.

She represented the Amazonas state in the Miss Venezuela 2008 pageant, on September 10, 2008, and placed in the 10 semifinalists.
