= Canal SUR (United States) =

American Spanish-language cable television channel

- Country: United States
- Broadcast area: United States

Ownership
- Owner: SUR, LLC (formerly Sistema Unido de Retransmisión)

History
- Founded: 1992
- Launched: 1992

Links
- Website: Canal SUR

Canal SUR (also known as SUR, derived from the initials of Sistema Unido de Retransmisión, the former name of the network's parent company) is an American television channel airing in the United States for the Latin American diaspora in the country, featuring programming from various Latin American television networks. The channel is headquartered in Miami and also owns two sister channels, SUR Perú and Estudio 5.

== History ==
The channel was created in mid-1992 by Peruvian businessman Héctor Delgado Parker. After his death the channel was still under the control of Delpark S.A., a holding that also included Panamericana Televisión.

In June 1998, a new administration took over the channel, under the control of brother Arturo and Álvaro Delgado Pastorino, who together wanted to revitalize the channel. At the time, the channel had claimed 4 million subscribers. Among the plans were the creation of an uplink facility in Central America, the addition of newscasts from Puerto Rico and entering the European market. An Ecuadorian newscast was added in August. On September 28, 1998, broadcasts to Europe started, using the Hot Bird 2B satellite. At this time, new agreements were signed with TPS, MediaOne and Telepiù.

The channel launched a new telecenter in June 2001 and doubled its number of subscribers. The new master control room enabled SUR to broadcast a wider array of newscasts and a more selective audience for advertisers. In September, the channel's distribution in Latin America was sold to Hawthorns, Inc. of Ernesto Schütz, the same businessman who had bought Panamericana from the Delgado Parker family in 1997. An agreement with iStreamPlanet in 2004 enabled live streaming of SUR's offer to subscribers online. In November 2006, it started broadcasting Jaime Bayly's Bayly desde Miami. In March 2008 a print publication, adapted from the TV channel's philosophy, SUR Titulares, began to be printed, with items adapted from the newscasts it aired.

In 2012, the channel changed its formula, withdrawing the news-intensive format it had since its beginning, concentrating more on high quality entertainment productions from Latin American networks.
