= Gabriela Fernández =

Venezuelan model

- Born: Gabriela Alexandra Fernández Ocanto; June 23, 1986 (age 39); Maracaibo, Venezuela
- Height: 1.74 m (5 ft 9 in)
- Beauty pageant titleholder
- Hair color: Black
- Eye color: Black

Gabriela Alexandra Fernández Ocanto is a Venezuelan pageant titleholder from Maracaibo, Zulia state, who competed in the Miss Venezuela 2008 pageant on September 10, 2008.

Fernández won the Miss Zulia 2008 title in a state pageant held in Maracaibo, Venezuela on 7 May 2008.

In 2012, Fernández was arrested by the Bolivarian National Intelligence Service, charged with assisting Colombian drug lord Daniel Barrera Barrera. In 2016, she was sentenced to eight years and eight months in prison after admitting to money laundering. She was released from prison in 2021, and was planning to write a book about her experience.
