= Miss International 2007 =

Beauty pageant edition

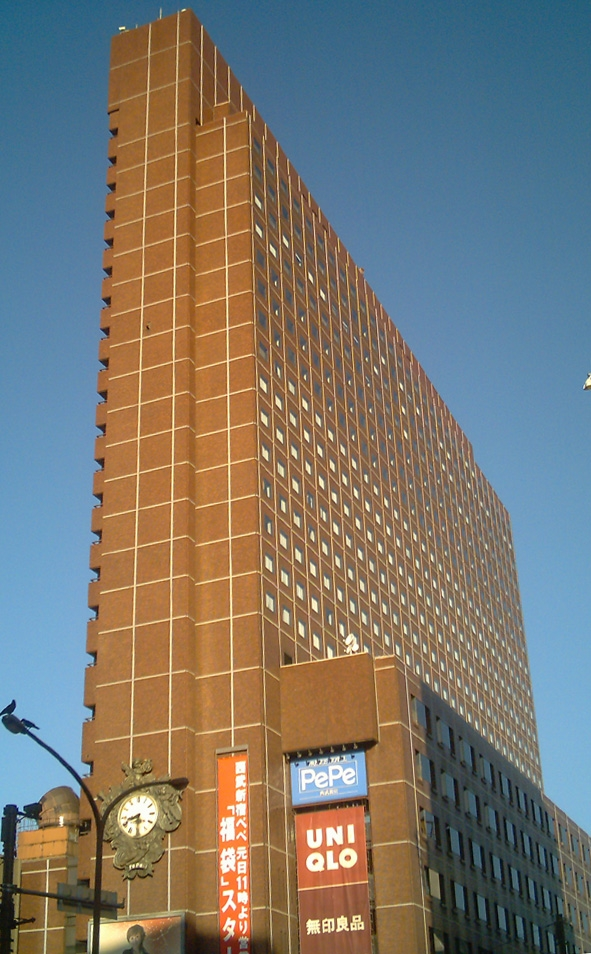
- Date: October 15, 2007
- Presenters: Yasuhiko Akasaka; Kyoko Kamei
- Venue: The Prince Park Tower, Tokyo, Japan
- Broadcaster: TV Tokyo (TXN/TX Network)
- Entrants: 61
- Placements: 15
- Debuts: Armenia; Belarus; Serbia
- Withdrawals: Cyprus; Kenya; Martinique; New Caledonia; Northern Mariana Islands; Norway; Serbia and Montenegro; Sudan
- Returns: Argentina; Chile; Costa Rica; El Salvador; Greece; Indonesia; Latvia; Lebanon; Liberia; Paraguay; Suriname; United Kingdom; United States
- Winner: Priscila Perales; Mexico
- Congeniality: Grace Wong (Hong Kong)
- Best National Costume: Jonella Oduber (Aruba)
- Photogenic: Hisako Shirata (Japan)

Miss International 2007, the 47th Miss International pageant, was held on October 15, 2007 at The Prince Park Tower in Tokyo, Japan. 61 contestants from all over the world competed for the crown.

At the end of the event, Miss International 2006, Daniela di Giacomo of Venezuela, crowned her successor Priscila Perales of Mexico as Miss International 2007. Perales was the first Mexican to win the Miss International title. The first runner-up was Despoina Vlepaki from Greece, and the second runner-up Yulia Sindzeyeva from Belarus.

== Results ==
=== Placements ===
Placement	Contestant
Miss International 2007	Mexico – Priscila Perales
1st runner-up	Greece – Despoina Vlepaki
2nd runner-up	Belarus – Yulia Sindzeyeva
Top 15	Chile – Marie Ann Salas; Czech Republic – Veronika Pompeova; Hong Kong – Grace Wong; Indonesia – Rahma Landy Sjahruddin; Japan – Hisako Shirata; Puerto Rico – Haydil Rivera; Russia – Alexandra Mazur; South Korea – Park Ga-won; Spain – Nerea Arce; Sri Lanka – Aruni Rajapaksha; Turkey – Asli Temel; Venezuela – Vanessa Peretti

=== Special awards ===
Award	Contestant
Miss Friendship	Hong Kong – Grace Wong
Best National Costume	Aruba – Jonella Oduber
Miss Photogenic	Japan – Hisako Shirata
Miss Internet	Vietnam – Phạm Thị Thùy Dương

== Contestants ==
Sixty-one contestants competed for the title.

Country/Territory	Contestant	Age	Hometown
Argentina	Paula Quiroga	20	Mendoza
Armenia	Rita Tsatryan	21	Yerevan
Aruba	Jonella Oduber	19	Savaneta
Australia	Danielle Byrnes	20	Sydney
Belarus	Yuliya Sindzeyeva	20	Marjina Horka
Bolivia	Angélica Olavarría	21	Santa Cruz de la Sierra
Brazil	Carolina Prates	20	Alegrete
Canada	Justine Stewart	21	Toronto
Chile	Marie Ann Salas	23	Santiago
China	Lina Ding	22	Hebei
Colombia	Ana Milena Lamus	21	San Juan del Cesar
Costa Rica	Leonela Paniagua	22	Guanacaste
Czech Republic	Veronika Pompeová	21	Jeseník
Dominican Republic	Ana Carolina Viñas	22	Santiago
Ecuador	Jessica Ortiz	21	Esmeraldas
Egypt	Madonna Khaled	22	Cairo
El Salvador	Ledin Damas	22	San Salvador
Ethiopia	Kidan Tesfahun	24	Addis Ababa
Finland	Joanna Väre	22	Mikkeli
France	Sophie Vouzelaud	20	Saint-Junien
Germany	Svetlana Tsys	18	Berlin
Greece	Despoina Vlepaki	22	Athens
Guadeloupe	Ann Love Viranin	20	Basse-Terre
Guatemala	Alida Maria Boer	23	Guatemala City
Honduras	Margarita Valle	23	Tegucigalpa
Hong Kong	Grace Wong	21	Hong Kong
India	Esha Gupta	21	New Delhi
Indonesia	Rahma Landy Sjahruddin	23	Jakarta
Japan	Hisako Shirata	25	Kōchi
Latvia	Laura Fogele	24	Riga
Lebanon	Grace Bejjani	18	Beirut
Liberia	Harriette Thomas	24	Monrovia
Malaysia	Yennie Yim Lim Nee	19	Penang
Mexico	Priscila Perales	24	Monterrey
Mongolia	Gerelchuluun Baatarchuluun	20	Ulaanbaatar
New Zealand	Kyla Hei Hei	21	Auckland
Nigeria	Sokari Akanibo	18	Lagos
Panama	Stephanie Araúz	21	Panamá City
Paraguay	Daiana Ferreira	20	Asunción
Peru	Luisa Fernanda Monteverde	21	La Libertad
Philippines	Nadia Lee Cien Shami	19	Midsayap
Poland	Dorota Gawron	23	Warsaw
Puerto Rico	Haydil Rivera	21	Adjuntas
Republic of the Congo	Jolette Sven Wamba Miylou	24	Brazzaville
Russia	Alexandra Mazur	20	Moscow
Serbia	Teodora Marčić	19	Novi Sad
Singapore	Christabelle Tsai	24	Singapore
Slovakia	Kristína Valušková	19	Banská Bystrica
South Korea	Park Ga-won	22	Seoul
Spain	Nerea Arce	19	Barakaldo
Sri Lanka	Aruni Rajapaksha	23	Kalpitiya
Suriname	Chantyn Ramdas	20	Paramaribo
Taiwan	Tzu-Wei Hung	24	Taipei
Tanzania	Jamilla Munisi	21	Dar es Salaam
Thailand	Chompoonek Badinworawat	22	Samut Prakan
Turkey	Asli Temel	24	Istanbul
Ukraine	Mariya Varyvoda	23	Kyiv
United Kingdom	Samantha Freedman	18	Hertfordshire
United States	April Strong	19	Chicago
Venezuela	Vanessa Peretti	21	Cumaná
Vietnam	Phạm Thị Thùy Dương	21	Hoa Lư

== Notes ==
=== Replacements ===
- Canada – Alice Panikian
- Guatemala – Hania Hernandez
- Honduras – Yasmina Roman
- Thailand – Prapaphan Phongsitthong
- Ukraine – Galena Andreyeva

=== Did not compete ===
- Bahamas – Melissa Key
- Cameroon – Marthe Nathalie Houag
- Ghana – Dilys Zahabi
- Norway – Karoline Kleven
- Nueva Esparta – Jennifer Maduro
- Sudan – Yar Ong'a
- Zambia – Karishma Patel
