= María Milagros Véliz =

Venezuelan beauty pageant winner

- Born: María Milagros Véliz Pinto; January 9, 1983 (age 43); Guacara, Carabobo, Venezuela
- Height: 1.78 m (5 ft 10 in)
- Beauty pageant titleholder
- Title: Miss Anzoátegui 2008; Miss Venezuela World 2008
- Hair color: Brown
- Eye color: Brown
- Major competitions: Miss Venezuela 2008 (Miss Venezuela World 2008); Miss World 2009 (Unplaced)

María Milagros Véliz Pinto (born January 9, 1986, in Guacara, Carabobo state, Venezuela) is a Venezuelan model and beauty pageant titleholder who represented Venezuela in Miss World 2009, held on December 12, 2009, in Johannesburg, South Africa. She was a finalist (top six) of the "Miss World Sports" fast-track competition.

Véliz, who stands 1.78 m (5 ft 10 in) tall, competed in Miss Venezuela 2008, on September 10, 2008, and obtained the title of "Miss Venezuela Mundo". She represented Anzoátegui state.

== Personal life ==
Véliz lives in London, United Kingdom, where she studies International Business at the European Business School London. She practices swim, Judo, high jump and other sports; and speaks Spanish, English, French and Italian.

Awards and achievements
| Preceded by Hannelly Quintero | Miss Venezuela World; 2008 | Succeeded by Adriana Vasini |
| Preceded by María Ortiz | Miss Anzoátegui; 2008 | Succeeded by Flory Díez |
