= Dayana Mendoza =

Venezuelan model, actress and former beauty pageant contestant

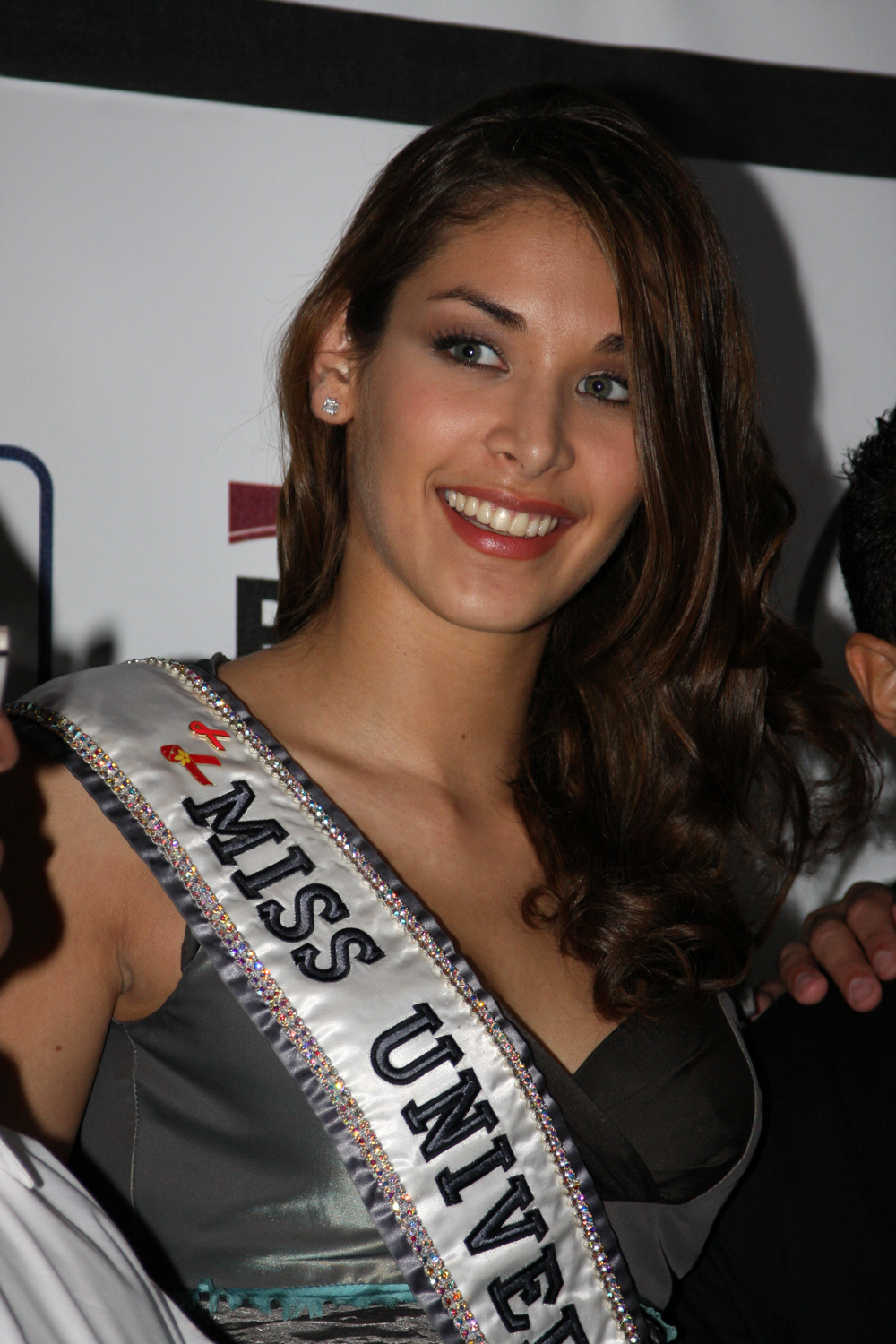
- Mendoza in 2009
- Born: Dayana Sabrina Mendoza Moncada; June 1, 1986 (age 40); Caracas, Venezuela
- Height: 176 cm (5 ft 9 in)
- Spouse(s): Michael Pagano (m. 2013; div. 2016) Carlos Uribe (m. 2025)
- Children: 2
- Beauty pageant titleholder
- Title: Miss Venezuela 2007; Miss Universe 2008
- Hair color: Brown
- Eye color: Green
- Major competitions: Elite Model Look International 2001; (Top 15); Miss Venezuela 2007; (Winner); Miss Universe 2008; (Winner)

Dayana Sabrina Mendoza Uribe (Spanish pronunciation: [daˈʝana menˈdosa]; née Moncada; born 1 June 1986) is a Venezuelan actress, model, film producer, director, and former beauty queen. She is most notably known for winning the Miss Universe 2008 pageant.

Mendoza is also widely known for participating in The Celebrity Apprentice 5 in 2012. In 2018, she ventured as a producer and director of films.

== Early life ==
Dayana Sabrina Mendoza Moncada, was born on 1 June 1986 in Caracas, Venezuela to Willy Mendoza and María Moncada, from the states of Táchira and Aragua respectively.

Mendoza was once kidnapped in Venezuela, and stated that its psychological trauma taught her to remain poised under pressure.

In 2001, she signed with Elite Model Management after being Top 15 semifinalist at the Elite Model Look International 2001 held in Nice, France.

== Pageantry ==
=== Miss Venezuela 2007 ===
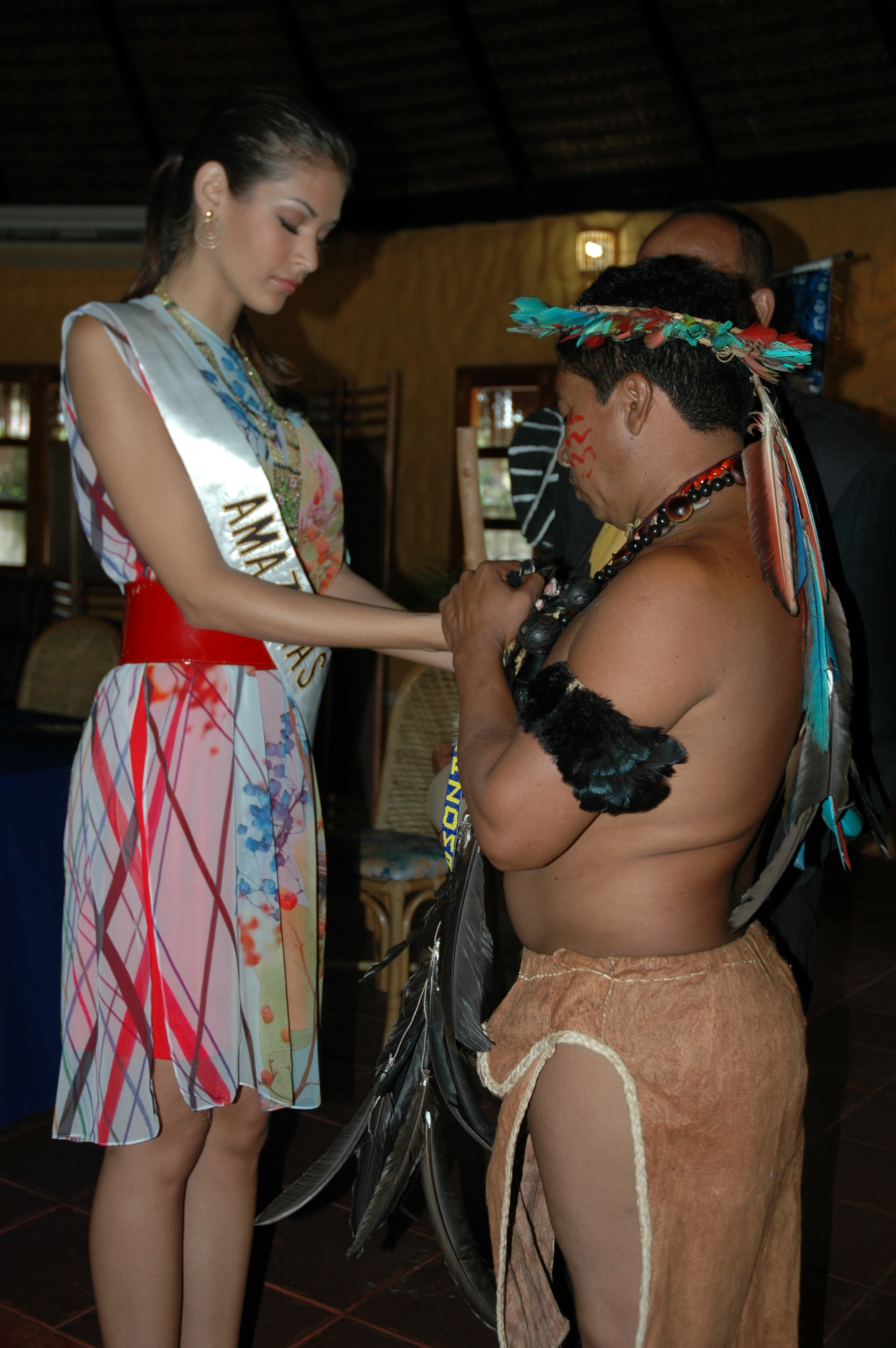
Mendoza in the Amazonas state, Venezuela

Mendoza beat out 27 other candidates to win Miss Venezuela 2007 on 13 September 2007, and became only the second woman representing the Amazonas state to win, following Carolina Izsak in 1991.

=== Miss Universe 2008 ===
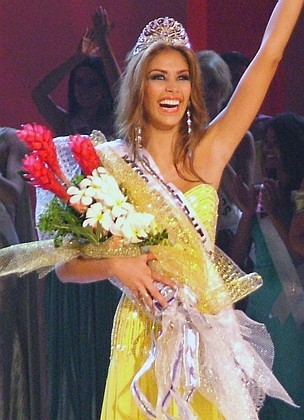
Mendoza after winning the title of Miss Universe

She was crowned Miss Universe 2008 at the pageant at the Crown Convention Center, Nha Trang, Vietnam, on 13 July 2008. Mendoza became the first pageant winner from Venezuela since Miss Universe 1996's winner Alicia Machado.

Miss Universe 2007 Riyo Mori crowned her with a tiara worth US$120,000. Her prize package includes cash, a year contract promoting Miss Universe, world travel, a rent-free prestigious New York City apartment, a luxury apartment, and a gift bag stuffed with designer shoes, dresses and beauty products, a US$100,000 stipend for a two-year course at the New York Film Academy and free access to famous fashion houses, and beauty parlors. Mendoza will spend her year-long reign traveling the world to lecture on humanitarian issues and to promote education regarding HIV/AIDS.

As of June 2009, Mendoza as Miss Universe has traveled to Indonesia, Singapore, Spain, France, Nicaragua, Ukraine, Czech Republic, Bahamas, Russia, El Salvador, the United Arab Emirates, Brazil, the Dominican Republic, Puerto Rico, Bolivia, Argentina, Romania, and Vietnam, in addition to numerous trips around the United States and her homecoming in Venezuela.

On 23 August 2009, she crowned her successor, fellow Venezuelan Stefanía Fernández, at the Imperial Ballroom in Nassau, The Bahamas.

=== Modeling photos ===
After photos of Mendoza modeling naked for a jewelry firm surfaced, officials from the Miss Universe Organization decided not to penalize her, saying that the candid photos were not pornographic but "artistic in nature, and they don't have an ounce of pornographic content to them."

=== Guantánamo Bay visit ===
On 27 March 2009, she documented a visit to the Guantanamo Bay detention camp on her Internet blog. In it, she was quoted as saying, "[Guantanamo] was such a relaxing place, so calm and beautiful". She also stated that when she visited the detainees camps, "...we saw the jails, where they shower, how they entertain themselves with movies, art classes, books. It was very interesting." In her home country, president Hugo Chávez publicly reconsidered the praise he had previously given her. The Miss Universe Organization has replied that "...[her] comments on her blog were in reference to the hospitality she received while meeting the members of the U.S. Military and their families who are stationed in Guantánamo". On 1 April 2009, the entry was removed from her blog.

== Personal life ==
She has worked with the companies Max Mara and Costume National, where she modeled in New York City, Italy, Germany, France, Greece, and Spain for Versace, Roberto Cavalli and other fashion designers over eight years. She speaks Spanish, English, and Italian fluently. After leaving Elite, she signed with the Trump Model Management since 2009, and in Milan with Names Model Agency. In 2012, she denied rumors that she had had an affair with Donald Trump.

In December 2013, Mendoza married businessman Michael Pagano. The wedding was celebrated in Altos de Chavón in the Dominican Republic. The celebration lasted three days. The former Miss Universe wore an outfit designed by the Venezuelan fashion designer Ángel Sánchez. The couple split in September 2016 with Mendoza declaring in an interview that the separation was carried out on good terms.

Subsequently, on 7 June 2015, Mendoza announced on her Instagram account that she was pregnant and expecting a daughter. On 5 October 2015, she gave birth to Eva Mendoza Pagano in New York.

In January 30, 2025, she announced on Instagram her engagement with Colombian pastor Carlos Uribe. They married in March of that year.

== Artistic career ==
Mendoza studied acting and cinema at New York Film Academy in the United States, thanks to a scholarship awarded by the Miss Universe Organization.

In 2009, she starred in her first short film Sweet Misery. That same year, she was part of the group of presenters of the Venevisión morning show, Portadas. In 2010, she hosted Relaxed, a celebrity talk show broadcast on E! Entertainment Latin America. That same year, she appeared in the music video "Bla Bla Bla". and accompanied Donald Trump to the island of Puerto Rico, where she recorded a golf program featuring the billionaire. Also in 2010, she was part of the cast of the comedy Lord of the Dreams.

Dayana participated in the famous reality show The Celebrity Apprentice with Donald Trump, where she interacted with personalities such as Lisa Lampanelli, George Takei, Clay Aiken and Debbie Gibson. Her participation in the TV program was controversial due to the alleged rivalry she had with the American comedian Lisa Lampanelli. Mendoza finished in 6th place.

In 2013, she played Jasmine in the short film, The Mermaid Complex. In 2017, she starred in the movie Nothing's Fair in Love, where she played Jessica. In 2018, she produced her first film titled Honey, which received good reviews. Honey was recognized as a semi-finalist film by the Hollywood International Film Festival.

In 2019, she participated as the host of the Queen Beauty Universe.

=== Other appearances ===
Together with Miss Universe 1969 Gloria Diaz, Mendoza was the goodwill ambassador of Venezuela-based technology firm Smartmatic to thank the Philippines for entrusting the company the success of their 2010 presidential elections.

On 3 June 2012, Mendoza served as one of the panel of judges for the Miss USA 2012 competition. In March 2015, she appeared in a commercial for a drink, along with Miss Universe 2012; Olivia Culpo of the United States and Miss Universe 2014; Paulina Vega from Colombia. The filming took place on the island of Bali, Indonesia.

On 6 January 2018, Mendoza returned to the Crown Convention Center in Nha Trang, Vietnam, where she had been crowned Miss Universe 2008, as a Miss Universe Vietnam 2017 judge.

== Filmography ==
- 2009: Sweet Misery (Short film.Natas Productions) ....... Protagonist.
- 2009: Portada's (Programa.Venevision) ........ presenter
- 2010: Lord of the Dreams (Short Film) ......... Supporting Actress (Isabela).
- 2010: Relaxed (Show interview.E! (Latin America)) ...... Hostess.
- 2010: Bla Bla Bla (Music Video) ......... Protagonist.
- 2012: Celebrity Apprentice (Reality Show, NBC) ... Participant.
- 2013: The Mermaid Complex ......... (Short Film) ........ Supporting Actress (Jasmine).
- 2017: Nothing's Fair in Love (short film, 1 More Mile Productions) .......... Protagonist (Jessica).
- 2018: Honey (Short film, Dayana Mendoza Productions in association with Jane Chae) ......... Executive producer and director
- 2019: Queen Beauty Universe 2019 .......... Presenter

== See also ==
- Stefanía Fernández
- Hannelly Quintero
- Dayana Colmenares
- Gabriela Isler

Awards and achievements
Preceded by (Japan) Riyo Mori	Miss Universe; 2008	Succeeded by (Venezuela) Stefanía Fernández
Preceded by Ly Jonaitis	Miss Venezuela; 2007	Succeeded by Stefanía Fernández
Preceded by Bárbara Sánchez	Miss Amazonas; 2007	Succeeded by Karina Rivero
