= Supranational Venezuela 2022 =

3rd Supranational Venezuela pageant

- Date: June 9, 2022
- Presenters: Melisa Rauseo; Jesús De Alva; Gabriela de la Cruz; Alejandro Carreño; Ronald Sanoja
- Entertainment: Luis Fernando Borja; Lion Lázaro; Jennifer Moya
- Venue: Junín Theatre, Caracas, Venezuela
- Broadcaster: International: DirecTV; Official broadcaster: Globovisión
- Entrants: 13 (Miss); 11 (Mister)
- Placements: 8 (Miss & Mister)
- Winner: Selene Delgado; Miranda; Jorge Eduardo Núñez; Zulia

Supranational Venezuela 2022 was the third Supranational Venezuela pageant. It was held at the Junín Theatre in Caracas, Venezuela on June 9, 2022.

At the end of the event, Valentina Sánchez of Nueva Esparta crowned her successor Selene Delgado of Miranda as Miss Supranational Venezuela 2023. She represented Venezuela at the Miss Supranational 2023 pageant placing in the Top 24.

At the same time, Ismelys Velásquez of La Guaira was appointed as Miss Supranational Venezuela 2022. She represented Venezuela at the Miss Supranational 2022 pageant placing as 4th runner-up.

Also, William Badell of Zulia titled his successor Jorge Eduardo Núñez of Zulia as Mister Supranational Venezuela 2023. He represented Venezuela at the Mister Supranational 2023 pageant due to visa problems, for this reason Anthony Gallardo of Distrito Capital replaced him representing the country in Mister Supranational 2022 placing in the Top 20.

== Background ==
=== Selection of participants ===
(No. 11) Miguel Ángel Montevideo Zapata retired from the competition.

== Pageant ==
=== Selection committee ===
The judges for Supranational Venezuela include:

- Tomás Seif – Dentist, specialist in aesthetic restorative dentistry
- Carlos Delgado – Plastic surgeon
- Ligia González – Dermatologist
- Érika Guerero – Erika's Cosmetic president
- Carlos Pérez – Fashion designer
- Alejandro González – NK technical and artistic director
- Erick Boscán – Banco Plaza president
- María Gabriela Lartitegui Arrieta – Le Mot public relations officer
- Alma Sevilla – Artmequid marketing manager
- Milena Laukasiewicz – Poland's chargé d'affaires in Venezuela
- María Laura Lona – Jorge Jaimes president
- Eleazar Guzmán – Lido Fitness & Spa personal trainer
- Víctor Jiménez – Hotel California Suite representative
- Otayma Zerpa – Otayma Zerpa Designs president
- Franklin Salomón – Stylist
- Dan Rojas – Fashion designer
- Stephany Zreik – Miss Earth Venezuela 2020 and Miss Earth Air 2020
- Julio César Pineada – Internationalist
- Vanessa Torres – Velvet The Beauty House director

== Results ==
=== Miss Supranational Venezuela ===
Color key

- Declared as winner
- Ended as runner-up or top 5/8 qualification
- Ended as one of the finalists or semifinalists

Placement	Contestant	International Placement
Miss Supranational Venezuela 2023	Miranda (No. 11) – Selene Delgado	Top 24 — Miss Supranational 2023
1st runner-up	Bolívar (No. 9) – Francisca Rodríguez	
2nd runner-up	Trujillo (No. 6) – Nicole Carreño	
3rd runner-up	Carabobo (No. 12) – Claudymar Oropeza	
4th runner-up	Falcón (No. 8) – Gregmary Vargas	
Top 8	Distrito Capital (No. 1) – Catherine Barreto; Carabobo (No. 4) – Jousy Chan; Anzoátegui (No. 13) – Valentina Díaz	

Miss Supranational Venezuela 2022 appointment

Placement	Contestant	International Placement
Miss Supranational Venezuela 2022	La Guaira – Ismelys Velásquez	4th runner-up — Miss Supranational 2022

Universal Woman Venezuela 2022 appointment

Placement	Contestant	International Placement
Universal Woman Venezuela 2022	Nueva Esparta – Valentina Sánchez	Universal Woman 2023

=== Mister Supranational Venezuela ===
Placement	Contestant	International Placement
Mister Supranational Venezuela 2023	Zulia (No. 9) – Jorge Eduardo Núñez	Unplaced (Top 25) — Mister Supranational 2023
1st runner-up (Appointed – Mister Supranational Venezuela 2022)	Distrito Capital (No. 10) – Anthony Gallardo	Top 20 — Mister Supranational 2022; Unplaced — Mister International 2025
2nd runner-up	Distrito Capital (No. 12) – Christian Nunes	Top 10 — Mister Global 2018; Unplaced — Mister Universe 2015
3rd runner-up	Carabobo (No. 3) – Félix Bolívar	
4th runner-up	Distrito Capital (No. 1) – Omar Riera	Top 17 — Man of the World 2023
Top 8	Carabobo (No. 2) – Jolber Figueredo; Distrito Capital (No. 5) – Jorge Luis Urbina; Aragua (No. 7) – Steven Aponte	

=== Special awards ===
==== Miss Supranational Venezuela ====
Award	Top 3	Winner
Best Catwalk	No. 3 – Elizabeth Gasiba; No. 10 – Verónica Dugarte	No. 3 – Steffanía Rodríguez
Best Skin	No. 2 – Michell Durán; No. 5 – María José Meza	No. 4 – Jousy Chan
Best Figure	No. 3 – Steffanía Rodríguez; No. 8 – Gregmary Vargas	No. 6 – Nicole Carreño
Miss Fitness	No. 3 – Steffanía Rodríguez; No. 5 – María José Meza	No. 13 – Valentina Díaz
Best Smile	No. 6 – Nicole Carreño; No. 9 – Francisca Rodríguez; No. 11 – Selene Delgado	No. 13 – Valentina Díaz
Best Face	No. 1 – Catherine Barreto; No. 4 – Jousy Chan	No. 11 – Selene Delgado
Best Hair	No. 4 – Jousy Chan; No. 10 – Estefani Narváez	No. 8 – Gregmary Vargas
Miss Interactive	No. 3 – Steffanía Rodríguez; No. 13 – Valentina Díaz	No. 11 – Selene Delgado
Best Look	No. 4 – Jousy Chan; No. 8 – Gregmary Vargas	No. 7 – María Andrea Martins
Miss Congeniality		No. 7 – María Andrea Martins
Supra Chat		No. 5 – María José Meza
Supra Project		No. 6 – Nicole Carreño

==== Mister Supranational Venezuela ====
Award	Top 3	Winner
Best Catwalk	No. 5 – Jorge Luis Urbina; No. 10 – Anthony Gallardo	No. 9 – Jorge Eduardo Núñez
Best Skin	No. 2 – Jolber Figueredo; No. 8 – Dajo Martínez	No. 3 – Félix Bolívar
Best Body	No. 2 – Jolber Figueredo; No. 6 – Alexander Barrera	No. 9 – Jorge Eduardo Núñez
Mister Fitness	No. 6 – Alexander Barrera; No. 9 – Jorge Eduardo Núñez	No. 12 – Christian Nunes
Best Smile	No. 3 – Félix Bolívar; No. 5 – Jorge Luis Urbina; No. 7 – Steven Aponte	No. 10 – Anthony Gallardo
Best Face	No. 3 – Félix Bolívar; No. 10 – Anthony Gallardo	No. 12 – Christian Nunes
Mister Interactive	No. 3 – Félix Bolívar; No. 9 – Jorge Eduardo Núñez	No. 10 – Anthony Gallardo
Mister Personality	No. 8 – Dajo Martínez; No. 10 – Anthony Gallardo	No. 5 – Jorge Luis Urbina
Best Look	No. 1 – Omar Riera; No. 7 – Steven Aponte	No. 2 – Jolber Figueredo
Supra Chat		No. 9 – Jorge Eduardo Núñez
Supra Project		No. 4 – Geralbert Rebolledo
Mister Elegance		No. 7 – Steven Aponte
Mister Congeniality		No. 3 – Félix Bolívar

== Contestants ==
=== Miss Supranational Venezuela ===
13 contestants competed for the title.

No.	Contestant	Age (Note: Ages at the time of the pageant)	Height	Hometown
1	Catherine Barreto	27	1.70 m (5 ft 7 in)	Caracas
2	Michell Alejandra Durán Hernández	25	1.63 m (5 ft 4 in)	Valencia
3	Steffanía Alejandra Rodríguez Vivas	23	1.70 m (5 ft 7 in)	Caracas
4	Jousy Bridget Chan López	23	1.71 m (5 ft 7 in)	Valencia
5	María José Meza Sánchez	23	1.71 m (5 ft 7 in)	Mérida
6	Nicole Alessandra Carreño Pérez	21	1.71 m (5 ft 7 in)	Trujillo
7	María Andrea Martins de Franca	26	1.73 m (5 ft 8 in)	Valencia
8	Gregmary José Vargas Petit	20	1.73 m (5 ft 8 in)	Coro
9	Francisca José Rodríguez Rodríguez	22	1.80 m (5 ft 11 in)	Ciudad Bolívar
10	Estefani Gabriela Narváez Márquez	20	1.77 m (5 ft 10 in)	Valencia
11	Selene Alejandra Delgado Delgado	25	1.80 m (5 ft 11 in)	Guatire
12	Claudymar Sarah Oropeza Avanzo	23	1.80 m (5 ft 11 in)	Valencia
13	Valentina del Valle Díaz Alcalá	22	1.82 m (6 ft 0 in)	Barcelona

=== Mister Supranational Venezuela ===
11 contestants competed for the title.

No.	Contestant	Age	Height	Hometown
1	Omar Alfonso Ely Riera Sambrano	33	1.78 m (5 ft 10 in)	Caracas
2	Jolber Enrique Figueredo Sequera	23	1.76 m (5 ft 9 in)	Valencia
3	Félix Eduardo Bolívar Osorio	28	1.77 m (5 ft 10 in)	Valencia
4	Geralbert Samuel Rebolledo Urrutia	29	1.77 m (5 ft 10 in)	Caracas
5	Jorge Luis Urbina Natera	23	1.80 m (5 ft 11 in)	Caracas
6	Alexander José Barrera Zambrano	21	1.83 m (6 ft 0 in)	Caracas
7	Ramón Esteban "Steven" Aponte Suárez	31	1.82 m (6 ft 0 in)	Turmero
8	Darwin José "Dajo" Martínez Figuera	32	1.87 m (6 ft 2 in)	Caracas
9	Jorge Eduardo Núñez Martínez	27	1.87 m (6 ft 2 in)	Ciudad Ojeda
10	Anthony Misael Gallardo Villegas	24	1.88 m (6 ft 2 in)	Caracas
12	Christian Arnaldo Nunes Angulo	28	1.93 m (6 ft 4 in)	Caracas
