= Carla Angola =

Venezuelan journalist and television presenter

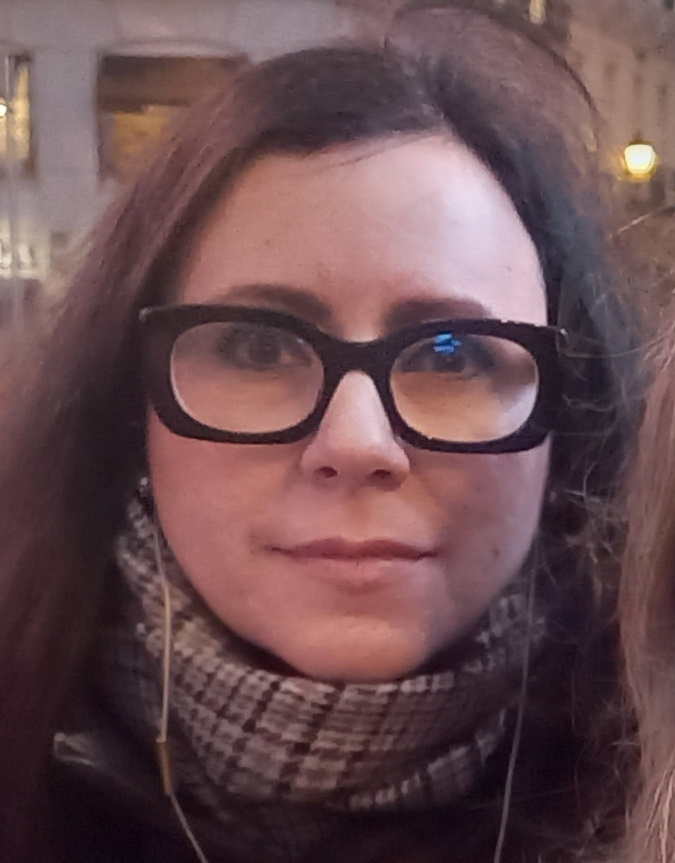
- Carla Angola in 2023
- Born: 24 December 1975 (age 50)
- Occupation: Journalist
- Parent: Isaura Rodríguez

Carla María Angola Rodríguez born 24 December 1975 is a Venezuelan journalist and television presenter, who worked for several years on the television program Buenas noches, of the television station Globovisión.

== Career ==
For several years Angola worked in Globovisión's television program Buenas noches, along with "Kiko" Bautista, Roland Carreño and Pedro Luis Flores. On 1 March 2020, Angola denounced that officers of the General Directorate of Military Counterintelligence (DGCIM) raided her home in La Pastora, Caracas, where her parents lived, and broke in by breaking a glass door. On August 4, 2022, the attorney general appointed by the 2017 Constituent National Assembly, Tarek William Saab, issued an arrest warrant against Angola, accusing her of "assassination apology".

She currently works at EVTV Miami and resides in Miami, United States.
