= Ly Jonaitis =

Venezuelan model and beauty queen

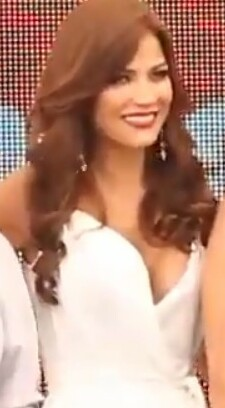
- Born: Lydimar Carolina Jonaitis Escalona; October 12, 1985 (age 40); Valencia, Carabobo, Venezuela
- Other name: Ly Jonaitis
- Height: 5 ft 11 in (1.80 m)
- Beauty pageant titleholder
- Title: Miss Venezuela 2006
- Hair color: Brown
- Eye color: Green
- Major competitions: Miss Venezuela 2006 (Winner); Miss Universe 2007 (2nd Runner-Up)

Lydimar Carolina Jonaitis Escalona (born October 12, 1985) is a Venezuelan actress, model and beauty pageant titleholder who won the Miss Venezuela 2006 pageant, then went on to compete at the Miss Universe 2007 pageant, where she placed 2nd Runner-Up.

== Pageant participation ==
=== Miss Venezuela 2006 ===
On September 14, 2006, Jonaitis competed in Miss Venezuela 2006, held in Caracas, where she beat 27 other contestants and obtained the title of Miss Venezuela 2006. She became the eighth Miss Guárico to win that title since the Miss Venezuela pageant first began in 1952.

=== Miss Universe 2007 ===
She then traveled to Mexico to represent Venezuela at the Miss Universe 2007 pageant in Mexico City on May 28, 2007. She became the 2nd runner-Up of the pageant, only behind Japan's Riyo Mori (winner) and Brazil's Natália Guimarães (1st runner-Up).

== Personal life ==
Ly is of Lithuanian and Venezuelan origin.

Jonaitis is a model who has worked with Metropolitan Models in France and modeled for Christian Dior, and other important fashion designers. She speaks Spanish, English and French.

== Telenovelas ==
- Nacer contigo
- Los misterios del amor

Awards and achievements
Preceded by (Switzerland) Lauriane Gilliéron	Miss Universe 2nd Runner-Up; 2007	Succeeded by (Dominican Republic) Marianne Cruz
Preceded by Jictzad Viña	Miss Venezuela; 2006	Succeeded by Dayana Mendoza
