= Globovisión =

24-hour television news network

- Type: Free-to-air television network
- Country: Venezuela
- Headquarters: Caracas, Venezuela

Programming
- Language: Spanish
- Picture format: 1080i HDTV (downscaled to 480i for the SDTV feed)

Ownership
- Owner: Juan Domingo Cordero; Raúl Gorrín; Gustavo Perdomo

History
- Launched: December 1, 1994

Links
- Website: Globovision.com

Availability

Terrestrial
- Analog UHF: Channel 33 (Caracas, listings may vary)
- Digital UHF: Channel 25.6

Globovisión is a 24-hour television news network. It broadcasts over-the-air in Caracas, Aragua, Carabobo and Zulia on UHF channel 33. Globovisión is seen in the rest of Venezuela on cable or satellite and worldwide from their website. Some of Globovisión's programs can be seen in the United States on cable network Canal Sur and TV Venezuela, a channel offered in DirecTV's Para Todos package. In Latin America, Globovision can be seen in Argentina, Colombia, Chile, Ecuador, Peru, Uruguay and other territories as Aruba, Trinidad and Tobago, Barbados and Curaçao in DirecTV's package (channels 293 and 724).

== History ==
On 1 December 1994, Luis Teófilo Núñez Arismendi, Guillermo Zuloaga Núñez, Nelson Mezerhane Gosen, and Alberto Federico Ravell Arreaza, inaugurated Globovisión, channel 33, the first 24-hour news network in Venezuela to broadcast over-the-air. Currently, Globovisión is broadcast over the air in Caracas, Aragua, Carabobo and Zulia. Globovisión's programming is also carried by 95 percent of the nation's cable systems.

The day after the 2002 coup attempt, Globovisión mostly rebroadcast the previous day's events. Federico Ravell reportedly called CNN to ask them to join a media blackout. CNN did not confirm nor denied the claim. Ravell was the only media executive that acknowledged withholding information that day, apologizing to "any viewer who feels we failed them that day." Gustavo Cisneros, director of Venevisión, and others have argued that the lack of coverage was caused by threats and intimidation from pro-Chávez demonstrators, who surrounded several television stations in Caracas.

In 2009, pro-government leader Lina Ron led an armed attack on Globovisión, where she and attackers threw tear gas into the headquarters of the news organization that left injured multiple individuals inside and threatened its security with firearms.

On 17 February 2010, Ravell, general director of the channel, was dismissed from his post by board of directors of Globovision due to "differences with its partners". Ravell said he had to " sacrifice himself leaving office for the channel wasn't sold and falls into the hands of Government of Hugo Chavez".

In 2013, Globovisión was sold to an economist and businessman with connections to the Venezuelan government, Juan Domingo Cordero, who also runs the insurance company La Vitalicia. Raúl Gorrín, one of the owners, maintained close connections with the government and, according to the New York Times, the opposition.

On 8 January 2019, the Office of Foreign Assets Control (OFAC) of the United States Department of the Treasury imposed sanctions against Gorrín and six other Venezuelans, accusing them of being part of "a significant plot of corruption" through the use of the foreign currency exchange system. Following the announcement, Globovisión and 23 other companies were added to the Specially Designated Nationals list of OFAC. All the assets subject to the jurisdiction of the United States are frozen and American citizens are prohibited from conducting economic transactions with them.

=== International ===
Overseas, Globovisión has affiliations with CNN en Español, RCN, Canal N, Panamericana Televisión, Canal Sur, Canal 13, Todo Noticias, Monte Carlo Televisión, Canal 4, Canal 8, and Ecuavisa.

== Shows ==
Most of the shows seen on Globovisión are national productions. They include:

- Aló Ciudadano – A call-in show hosted by Leopoldo Castillo. This program was simulcasted on the Radio Caracas Radio after Hugo Chavez government expropriated the radio network Circuito Nacional Belfort. In the network until 2013 was co-hosted by Sheina Chang, Maria Alejandra Trujillo, Pedro Pablo Peñaloza, Carlos Acosta, Verioska Velasco, and Andreina Fuenmayor. The interim host were Nitu Pérez Osuna and María Elena Lavaud.
- Aló Venezuela – A Sunday talk show hosted by Del Valle Canelon and Ismael Garcia.
- Tocando Fondo – A talk show, hosted by Ana Karina Villalba seen on Sundays at 11 am.
- Vladimir a la Una – A daily talk show, hosted by Vladimir Villegas Polhiak at 1 pm.
- Kikosis – A daily talk show, hosted by Kiko Bautista at 1 pm.
- Globovision Economia – A daily economy news show hosted by Mariana Martinez at 3 pm.
- Entre Noticias – A weekend news show hosted by Marianna Gomez
- Plomovisión – A documentary series hosted by Johnny Ficarella. This program's name originated from an epithet given to the channel by President Hugo Chávez.
- Shirley – A talk show hosted by Jewish journalist Shirley Varnagy
- Primera Página – A morning news show hosted by Aymara Lorenzo, José Vicente Antonetti, Carolina Alcalde, Jessica Morales, and Andreína Gandica. It comes on at 6 am on weekdays. José Domingo Blanco and Nathaly Salas Guaithero once hosted this show. It was originally hosted by Julio César Camacho.
- Brujula Internacional – An evening international news show hosted by ambassador Julio César Pineda.
- En la Mañana – Another morning news show hosted by Williams Echeverría.
- La Alegre Cocina de Dino's - A kitchen show hosted by chef Dino D'Avanzo
- Biografías – A documentary series on famous Venezuelan personalities hosted by Maky Arenas.
- Hablan las Paredes – A night talk show, hosted by Guillermo Tell Troconis.
- Es Tendencia– A saturday talk show, hosted by Mariana Valle.
- Mujeres en Todo (program) – A live variety show with Alba Cecilia Mujica, Maria Isabel Parraga and Veronica Rasquin.
- Titulares de Mañana – A show which reveals the front pages of tomorrow's newspapers in Venezuela. This show was originally hosted by Orlando Urdaneta. Orlando Urdaneta then changed the program's name to La Hora de Orlando in 2003. After he left Globovisión in 2004, the name was reverted to "Titulares de Mañana" with Pedro Luis Flores and Jesus "Chuo" Torrealba as its host.
- Noticias Globovisión – The network's main newscast, anchored by Gladys Rodríguez, Roman Lozinski, Carolina Alcalde, Juan Eleazar Figallo and Diana Carolina Ruiz
- Noticias Globovisión Edicion Juvenil – A newscast that emerged as a result of the "Law of Social Responsibility in Radio and Television" and has become a highly valued format among the Venezuelan public. It was hosted by young people Jorge Luis Pérez Valery and Luis Anibal Velásquez. This "Youth Broadcast" aired Mondays at 2:30 p.m. and Tuesdays through Fridays at 2:30 p.m. and 3:30 p.m. Additionally,
- "Los Niños en la Calle"- aired Saturday at 5:00 p.m., a program that has won several Venezuelan awards for its quality and social commitment. It was hosted by young people Jorge Luis Pérez Valery and Luis Anibal Velásquez
- Noticias Deportivas Globovisión Edicion Juvenil - Youth Edition of Globovisión Sport has several daily broadcasts anchored by Carlos Alberto Figueroa and Jorge Luis Perez Valery.
- Grado 33 – A news documentary series hosted by Norberto Mazza, María Elena Lavaud and Roberto Giusti. This program was very critical of the Chávez government.
- Soluciones – morning talk show hosted by Shirley Varnagy and Nathalie Viteznik.
- CNN World Report – Saturday morning ecological program hosted by Fernando Jauregui
- El Radar de los Barrios – morning talk show hosted by Chuo Torrealba.
- La cocinita de Sindy – Saturday cooking talk show hosted by Sindy Lazo.
- 35MM – One of the few non-political shows on Globovisión, it contains the latest news on upcoming Hollywood movies and is hosted by Víctor X.
- Toque de Diana - segment of Noticias Globovision hosted by Diana Carolina Ruiz
- Faranduleando, which contains celebrity news.
- Paparazzi del Deporte, which contains sport celebrity news.
- Usted lo vio – Week news Summary show host by Juan Eleazar Figallo.
- Ecopracticas – Saturday morning ecological program hosted by Fernando Jauregui
- Alta Densidad – A technology news show hosted by Carlos José Monzón.
- Sin Flash TV – A show, hosted by beauty queen Cynthia Lander, about the currently most popular society parties and events in Venezuela and world.
- Saber Vivir- A health micro by Martha Palma Troconis.
- Alta Postura- A fashion program hosted by Giancarlo Berardinelli
- Los Años Dorados: A Sunday show conducted by Álvaro "Cuchillo" Durán
- Con todo y Penzini – A variety news show hosted by Pedro Penzini.
- Se Habla Verde – An ecological micro conducted by Karen Bitton.
- Deportes Globovisión – Globovisión's sports show hosted by Aloys Marín and
- Así Cocina Soucy – A cooking and gourmet show hosted by Héctor Soucy.
- Buenas Noches – An evening talk show hosted by Francisco "Kiko" Bautista, Carla Angola, and Roland Carreño.
- Sabado en la Noche – A Saturday night talk show hosted by Rocío Higuera, Gabriela Paez y Melisa Rauseo.
- Cuando las ganas se juntan – A Sunday night show with Bettsimar Diaz.
- Analisis Situacional – A Sunday interviewer program conducted by Oscar Schemel
- Turismo con Montenegro – Sunday morning turistic program hosted by Alvaro Montenegro
- Yo Prometo – A Sunday news show hosted by Nitu Pérez Osuna.
- El Rostro sin máscara – conducted by criminalist Juan Manuel Mayorca.
- El Mundo, Economía y Negocios – A Sunday news magazine of economy.
- Fun Race – A documentary series on 4X4s hosted by Sabrina Salvador and Goizeder Azúa.

== Relationship with government ==
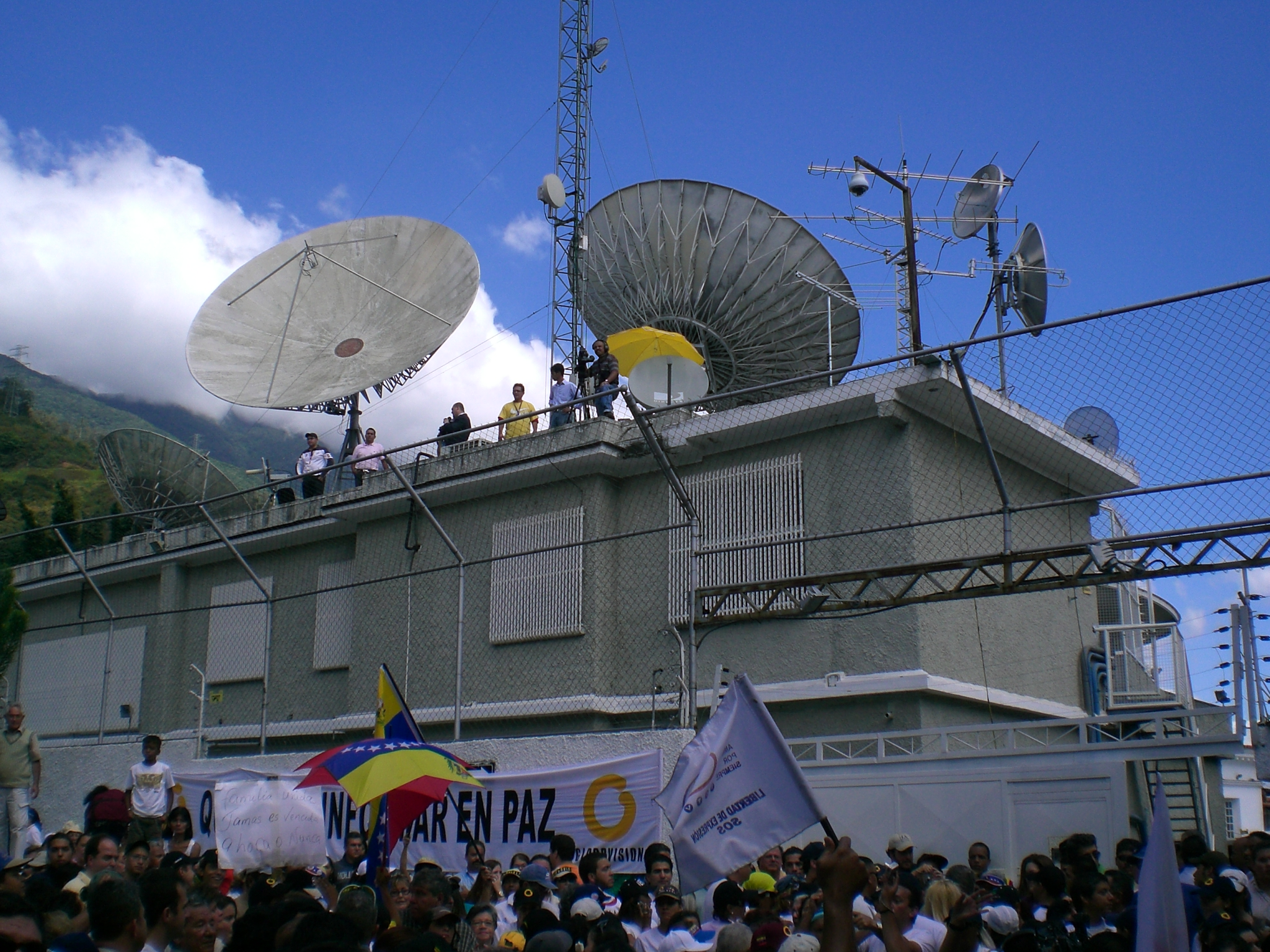
Globovisión building, Caracas

Globovisión was critical of the Chavista movement. Along with other private television stations, it supported the Venezuelan opposition protests against President Hugo Chávez, celebrating the 2002 coup attempt along with its leaders and censoring reports of countercoup action that placed Chávez back into office. The network was a leading entity within the opposition coalition Coordinadora Democrática beside Venevisión and Fedecamaras, supporting insurrection against the Chávez government.

Globovision is able to broadcast outside of Venezuela, and does so through satellite television. Microwave equipment, which allows for live transmissions, has been seized by the Government.

In May 2007, President Chávez claimed during a speech that Globovision had been actively encouraging civil unrest in Venezuela, as well as his assassination. His claim on the latter was based on broadcast footage of the attempted murder of Pope John Paul II (which was part of a series of pictures showing RCTV's historical news coverage) in combination with a song titled "Esto no termina aquí" ("This does not end here"). The Venezuelan government filed a complaint against Globovision with the Attorney General Office on this matter. Venezuelan students marched in the streets to protest the closure of RCTV and threats to Globovision. Globovision's director, Alberto Ravell, said, "We are not going to change our editorial line that we are not afraid of the threats from this government."

In information published through WikiLeaks from the United States Embassy in Venezuela, after "60 allegations" against Globovisión in Venezuelan court, the Venezuelan government pressured a partner, banker Nelson Mezerhane, to buy all the shares of Globovisión in order to fire Ravell.

After the 2013 sale of Globovisión to Juan Domingo Cordero, Globovisión's managerial staff stated that the editorial line would be changed and would be forced to move to the "centre".

=== Investigation ===
In 2009, Venezuela's telecommunications regulator launched four different investigations into Globovisión. Reporting about an earthquake before an official report later made on the official government channel and not paying $2.3 million tax for giving free airtime to anti-government groups during the 2002 oil strike were two of the accusations in the investigations. Chávez demanded sanctions against Globovisión, calling station director Alberto Federico Ravell "a crazy man with a cannon". This action was criticized by two officials who monitor freedom of speech, Frank La Rue of the United Nations and Catalina Botero of the Organization of American States.

On March 25, 2010, network owner Guillermo Zuloaga was briefly arrested, then released pending investigation, by Venezuelan military intelligence. The country's Attorney General Luisa Ortega Diaz stated that the arrest was for speech by Zuloaga that President Hugo Chávez deemed false and "offensive."

Human Rights Watch, Amnesty International, the Human Rights Foundation, the Inter American Press Association, the International Press Institute, the United States Department of State, Reporters without Borders, representatives of the Catholic Church, and others have protested the investigation and Chavez's infringement on press freedom in Venezuela.
