= Burro Island =

Lacustrian island in Venezuela

Coordinates: 10°16′44″N 68°13′11″W

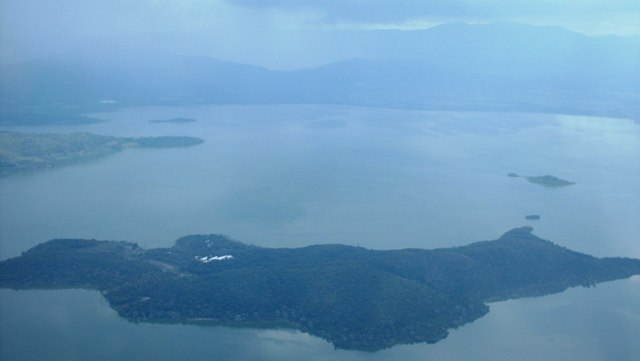
- Aerial view of Isla del Burro
- Interactive map of Burro Island

Geography
- Location: Lake Valencia

Administration
- Venezuela
- Carabobo

Burro Island (Spanish: Isla del Burro, also known as Tacarigua Island) is a 247-hectare island belonging to Venezuela, located in the waters of Valencia Lake. It is the largest of the 22 islands in the lake. Administratively, it is part of Guacara municipality in the central Venezuelan state of Carabobo.

== Name ==
It is said that Burro Island got its name due to its supposed appearance of a sleeping donkey when viewed from above. The island is home to a number of donkeys, as well as free-roaming bulls and cows; how they arrived on the island is unclear.

== Properties ==
The closest settlement to Burro Island is Güigüe in the state of Carabobo. Burro Island is located 470 meters above sea level. Its temperature ranges from 25 to 30 degrees Celsius; the island experiences intense sunlight and strong breezes, akin to conditions on the coast.

== History ==
The island has an old prison that was used for many years in the twentieth century. During the reign of Juan Vicente Gómez, the prison housed common criminals. In the 1950s, it was converted into a correctional facility for adolescents. Between 1960 and 1970, it was used to imprison political prisoners. Finally, it was closed in the 1980s, and the facility fell into disrepair, with much of the roof collapsing. In March of 2011, the government enabled access to Burro Island as part of a pilot program, with the Ministry of Tourism repairing the historic prison and turning it into a museum.

== See also ==
- Geography of Venezuela
