= Universidad Tecnológica del Centro =

Coordinates: 10.2058°N 67.8758°W

Center Technological University
- Universidad Tecnológica del Centro
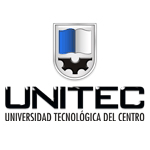
- Motto: Lo mejor empieza aquí
- Motto in English: The best starts here
- Type: Private
- Established: 1981
- President: César Peña Vigas
- Provost: Nilda Sanabria
- Rector: Luis Martínez
- Location: Guacara, Venezuela
- Website: www.portal.unitec.edu.ve

The Center Technological University (UNITEC) (Spanish: Universidad Tecnológica del Centro) is a private university located in Carabobo, Venezuela. Its academic activities began in August 1981 in Guacara. The UNITEC college also has a campus in Valencia.

== History ==
It is in the environment of civil society in Carabobo, between 1975 and 1976, the effective disposition to respond to the most felt needs of the community. It is then that institutional meetings are organized in order to inventory those needs. From those meetings always arose the idea of creating a higher education private center which would contribute to the work that the State had been successfully developing at the University of Carabobo. ( public Institution)

The idea comes from a collective spirit, and two institutions offer themselves as a spearhead for the realization of that dream: the Valencia Chamber of Commerce and the Voluntary Dividend for the Community. The president of the Chamber of Commerce was, then, Ángel Reinaldo Ortega, who was accompanied, as director of Human Resources of the Chamber by: Frida Añez. The General Manager of Voluntary Dividend for the Community at that time was Consuelo González Cortés.

From the promoting idea, the Technological University of the Center Foundation was created, in strictly legal terms. González recorded the act with satisfaction, like someone who remembers a bright moment: “It was a very lucid act, the whole city was present, it was a very special moment. Then all this boom of private universities and technological ones had not happened: we set a pattern and we were born as a different institution and that is how we have remained”.

Later, González offered a definition, some paradigms that have guided the university since its inception: “A different higher education institution, which assumes challenges, which forms and has a group of people who collaborate, teachers, authorities, employees and students, a group that is trying to carry out education, towards the response to the collective needs raised, especially productivity.” Once the foundation was established, on November 30, 1976, chaired by Celis Pérez, the fundraising process began.

Three conditions are determined, depending on the nature of the contribution: life member, founding member and sponsoring member. The search for land on which to establish the university campus also began at this moment. That is when the donation of a 10-hectare plot of land in the town of Guacara by the Branger Sagarzazu Succession arises. But not everything went in the search for material resources, a team was also formed that would have as its task the educational and curricular design of the university, at the same time that the pedagogical design advanced, the first outlines for the architectural design of the campus were being given: one design led to another.

Once the university project has been established, the Foundation presents it to the National Council of Universities and, after rigorous analysis, the President of the Republic, Luis Herrera Campins, on September 27, 1979 signs the decree authorizing the creation of the Technological University of the Center. Only then was the Superior Council of the University created, made up of representatives of the academic and business world.

Academic activities began in August 1981, offering careers in Information Engineering and a Bachelor's Degree in Administrative and Management Sciences as well as Technicians in Logistics and Procedures and Methods.

In 2007 the America Economía magazine published in its 346th edition the regional preferences when hiring executives, UNITEC ranked 50th among all Latin American universities.

== Undergraduate ==
Engineering

- Information
- Network & Communications
- Industrial Production
- Electric
- Mechanical

Social Sciences

- Administrative Sciences & Management
- Public Accounting

Technical Studies

- Information
- Network & Communications
- Industrial Production
- Logistics
- Marketing
- Procedures & Methods
- Human Resources
- Electric
- Mechanical

== Postgraduate Degrees ==
Doctorate

- Doctorate of Business Administration Sciences

Management Master´s Degree

- Domotics & Inmotics
- Information
- Innovation & Knowlwdge
- Finances
- Quality & Productivity
- Logistics
- Marketing
- Resources

Management Specialization´s Degree

- Information
- Innovation & Knowlwdge
- Finances
- Quality & Productivity
- Logistics
- Marketing
- Human Resources

== Distinguished alumni and persons ==
- Gabriela Isler - Miss Venezuela 2012 and Miss Universe 2013
