= Chicas Polar =

Venezuelan model group

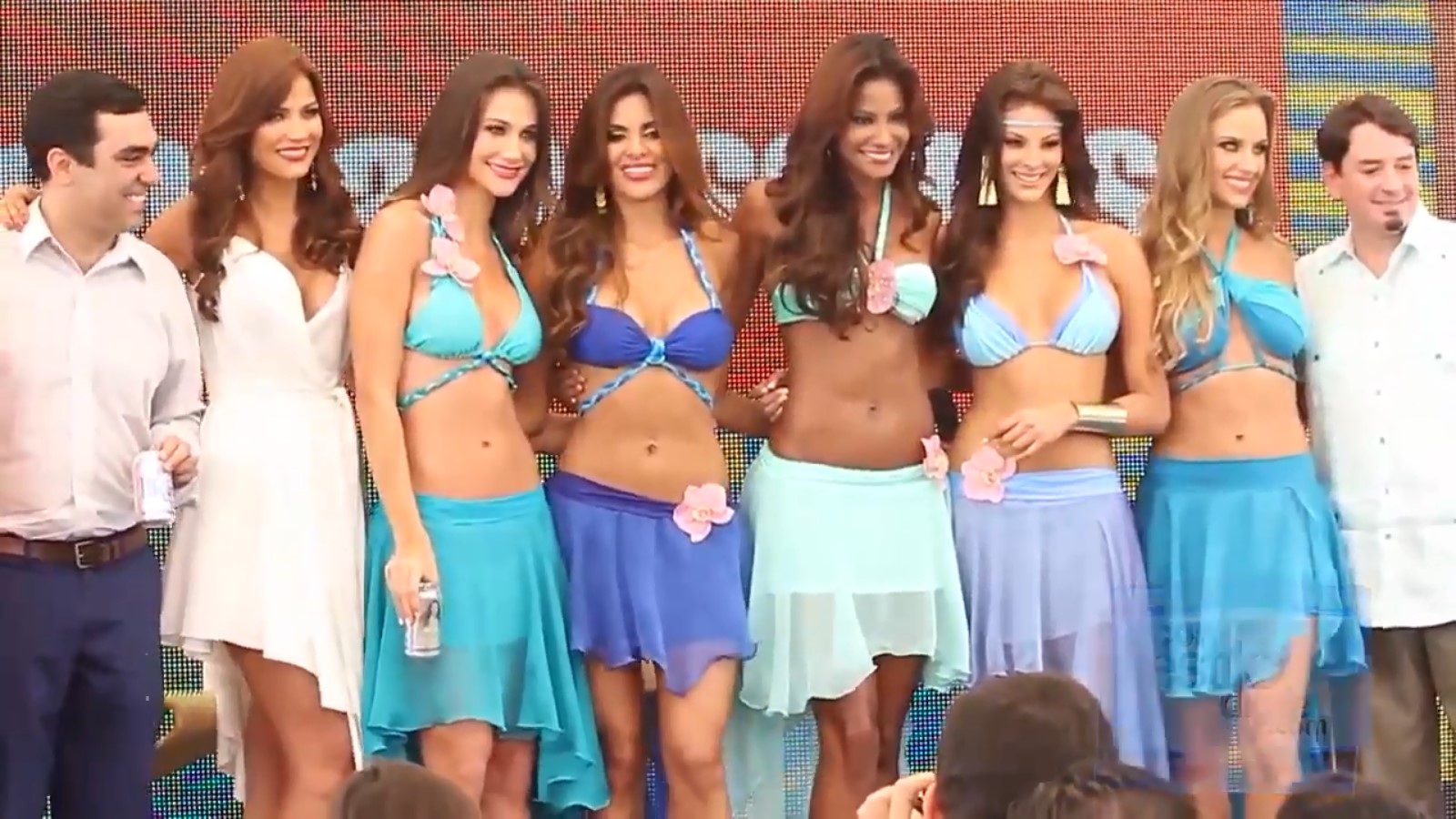
From left to right (only women): Ly Jonaitis, María De Luz Da Silva, Hannelly Quintero, Grabiela Concepción, Ligia Hernández and Andrea Matties. Campaign 2014.

The name Chicas Polar (lit. 'Polar Girls') refers to the models who have worked as image in the advertising campaign to promote Polar Pilsen beer in Venezuela.

The Empresas Polar campaign was launched for the first time in 2001 and has since then been renewed every year. The billboards alongside the highways in Caracas and other places in the country are very popular, as well as the calendars with pictures shot in landscapes as Choroni Beach or rivers from la Gran Sabana.

The media impact of the Polar Girls has been such that in Latin America and Europe they have been compared to Victoria's Secret Angels. Since the 2006 campaign, new models were called Chicas Pilsen ("Pilsen Girls").

== Chicas Polar by Campaign ==
The following table shows the models who have been part of the campaigns, alphabetically organized by year and last name. The years where they have been part of the campaign are marked in gray.

Models	Campaign																					
Models	2000s									2010s										2020s		
Models	01	02	03	04	05	06	07	08	09	10	11	12	13	14	15	16	17	18	19	20	21	22
Norkys Batista																						
Gaby Espino																						
Claudia Moreno																						
Patricia Rangel																						
Annarella Bono																						
Daniela Kosán																						
Deisy Arvelo																						
Norelys Rodríguez																						
Daniella Mateu																						
Mirela Mendoza																						
Ligia Petit																						
Aura Ávila																						
Marjorie de Sousa																						
Zoraya Villareal																						
Patricia Fuenmayor																						
Dayra Lambis																						
Elizabeth Herrera																						
María Fernanda León																						
Andrea Matthies																						
Marlene de Andrade																						
Ly Jonaitis																						
Anyela Quiñonez																						
Jessica Barboza																						
Vanessa Goncalves																						
Marjorie Magri																						
Grabiela Concepción																						
María de Luz Da Silva																						
Ligia Hernández																						
Yuvanna Montalvo																						
Hannely Quintero																						
Gabriella Ferrari																						
Ivanna Vale																						
Anmarie Camacho																						
Georgina Mazzeo																						
Karen Soto																						
Elizabeth Coello																						
Diana Croace																						
Anyela Galante																						
Carla Field																						
Marie Claire Harp																						
Adriana Marval																						
Esthefany Kolman																						
Fabianny Zambrano																						
Claudia Bessegio																						
Aigil Gómez																						
Alessandra Sánchez																						
Kemberling Rivas																						
