= Yagua, Venezuela =

Yagua
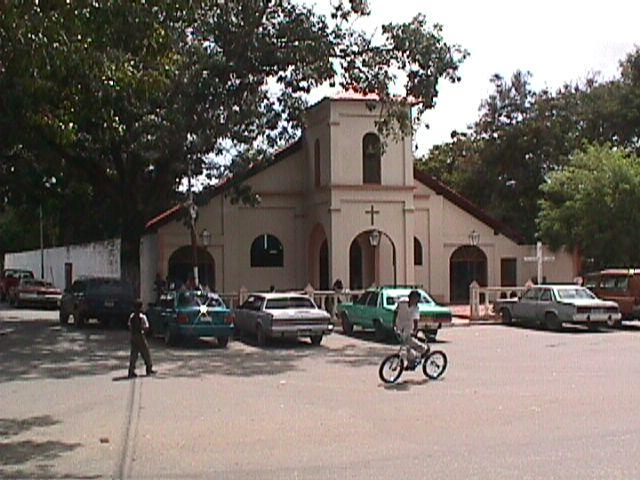
- Yagua church

- Location in Venezuela
- Coordinates: 10°15′23″N 67°54′17″W
- Country: Venezuela
- State: Carabobo
- Municipality: Guacara Municipality
- Founded: 1694
- Time zone: UTC−4 (VET)

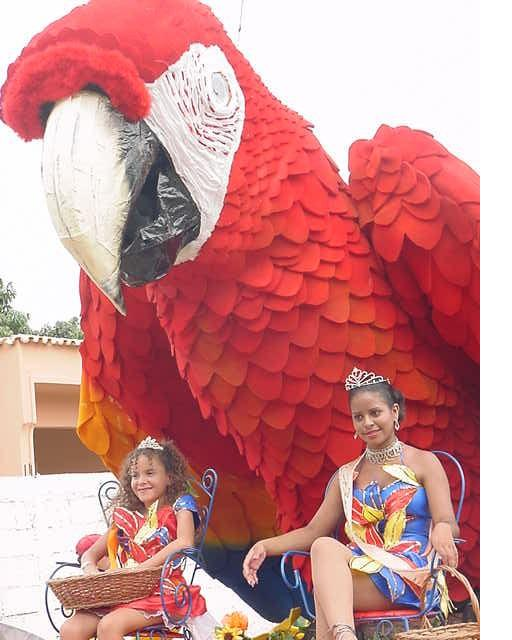
Traditional Festivity of the Flowers in Yagua

Yagua is a Venezuelan town located to the Northwest of the Valencia Lake, in the Guacara Municipality in the Carabobo State. The area corresponds to the rural parish of the same name.

In the area of Tronconero, Vigirima, there are petroglyphs made by pre-Colonial Indians.

== History ==
The entire area became inhabited thousands of year ago by the Indians of the Tacarigua Lake (Valencia Lake). The town of Yagua was founded on 20 February 1694, at the same time as the city of Guacara. Until 1935 a large part of the area was property of Pimentel, a friend of dictator Juan Vicente Gómez.

Yagua became a rural parish on 27 June 1988.

== Population ==
There are some 18,000 people living in the area.

Year	Population
1990	10,145
1991	10,596
1992	11,057
1993	11,528
1994	12,010
1995	12,501
1996	13,002
1997	13,513
1998	14,034
1999	14,564
2000	15,103
2005	17,942 (proyección)

Población de Parroquias de Carabobo

== Infrastructure ==
The second most important oil distribution centre of Venezuela is located in the outskirts of the town proper.

Yagua has an important sport centre for the area, the Centro Deportivo Yagua.
