= Güigüe Abbey =

Benedictine abbey in Güigüe, Venezuela

Coordinates: 10°04′39″N 67°48′19″W

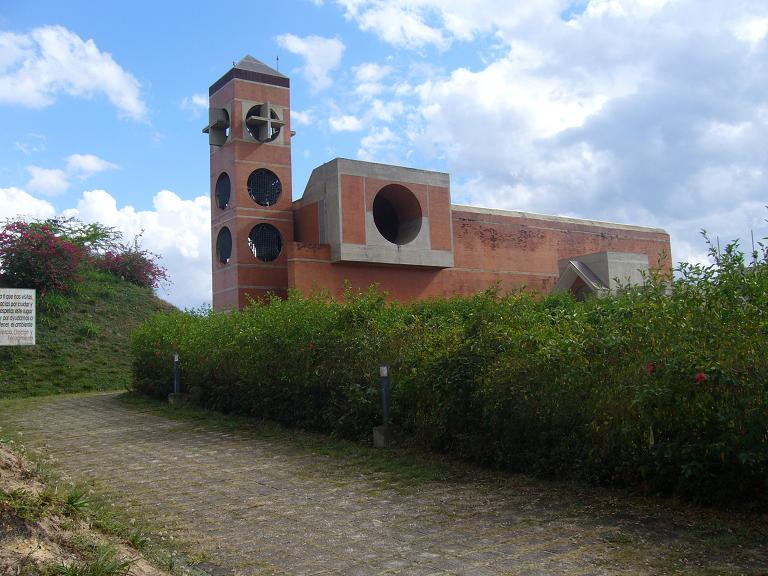
- Güigüe Abbey church
- Interactive map of Güigüe Abbey

Monastery information
- Other name: San José Abbey
- Order: Congregation of Missionary Benedictines of Saint Ottilien, Order of Saint Benedict
- Established: April 2, 1923
- Mother house: St. Ottilien Archabbey
- Dedication: Saint Joseph
- Diocese: Valencia

People
- Founders: Abbot Fr Norbert Weber, OSB
- Abbot: José María Martínez Barrera

Site
- Location: Güigüe, Carabobo, Venezuela

San José Abbey, Güigüe, Venezuela, is a Benedictine abbey of the Congregation of Missionary Benedictines of Saint Ottilien. Currently located to the south of Lago de Valencia, the monastic community was originally established as a mission procure in Caracas following World War I. Caracas' expansion restrained the development of the abbey, and in the late 1980s the monks relocated to Güigüe. The community's superior is Fr Abbot José María Martínez Barrera.

== History ==
=== Early Days in Caracas ===
Like the Missionary Benedictines' St. Paul's Abbey and Christ the King Priory, the original monastic community in Caracas was established at the behest of Archabbot Norbert Weber in the wake of World War I. The Congregation had learned the dangers of having all of its resources concentrated in Germany. If another crisis were to occur, the survival of the missions required that personnel be spread around the world. With this in mind, Archabbot Weber took over a boys' boarding school in Caracas, Venezuela. The site was also the location of a shrine to Saint Joseph, devotion to which the new residents continued to foster. The first Missionary Benedictines arrived from Germany on April 2, 1923. Among the group were some with mission experience in Africa, and others who had worked at an attempted monastic foundation in Argentina.

The monks continued to maintain the school, but added technical training to the boys' academic regimen. The many visitors to the shrine of San José del Avila allowed the Benedictines to exercise their charism of hospitality. The shrine inspired the creation of the "Pia Union de San José del Avila", whose members supported the activities of the Missionary Benedictines. This was a great advantage in the days monastery's early days, when efforts were concentrated at procuring funds for the Congregation's missions.

In its initial stages, the monastery depended entirely on expatriate German vocations. This source was interrupted by World War II, during which the Congregation's German monasteries were forcibly shut down by the Nazi regime. Thus, the Venezuelan monastery needed to cultivate local vocations in order to stay alive. However, the culturally German character of the abbey made it difficult to entice Venezuelans to join. An effort to cater to local vocations led the community to gather several monks from monasteries in Spain. The drought of local vocations continued, until the monks opened a house in Bogotá, Colombia in 1961.

=== Relocation to Güigüe ===
In 1964, seventeen years after becoming a conventual priory, San José del Avila was raised to the status of an abbey, under the leadership of Fr Abbot Theobald Schmid. At this time, the community was quite international, featuring monks from Germany, Switzerland, Spain, and France. However, as the community continued to grow, so did the city of Caracas. While San José had been on the city's outskirts at the time of its founding, by 1976 the monastery had to deal with the deafening noise produced by nearby eight-lane highways. Thus, in 1981, it was decided to permanently relocate to a rural area about 150 km southwest of Caracas. On August 10, 1985, the monks took up temporary residence in Camuri Chaco, east of Caracas, while a permanent monastery at Güigüe was under construction.

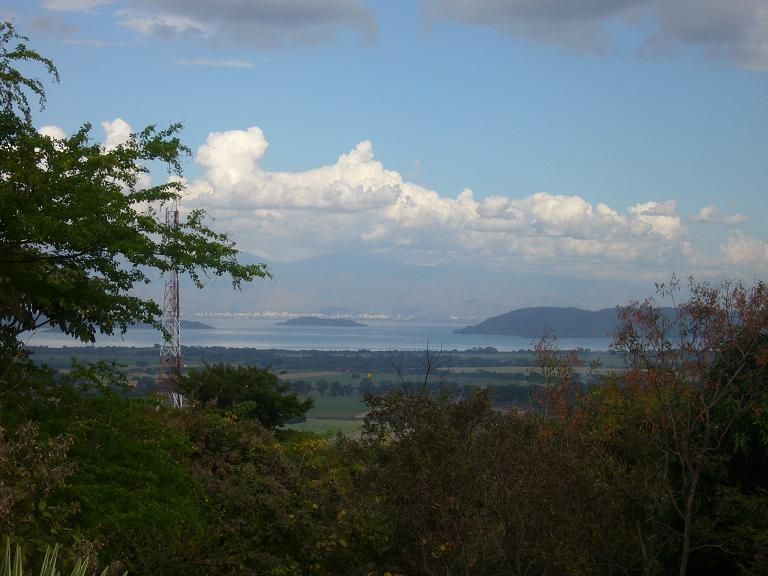
View of Valencia Lake from the abbey

The new, modern-looking monastery at Güigüe now stands in marked contrast to the traditional shrine that the monks had inhabited in Caracas. Following four years of construction, the monks were able to move into their new building. On June 20, 1990, the archbishop of Valencia consecrated the abbey's church. The change in location brought about a corresponding change in apostolate. Now the monks concentrated their efforts on hospitality and spiritual direction. Agriculture also provided a source of regular income.

== Dependencies ==
- El Rosal: Founded near Bogotá, Colombia, in 1961, El Rosal was raised to the status of a simple priory in 1963. The monastery was founded with the intent of recruiting and training local monastic vocations. The community became a conventual priory in 1992. Its eight monks are under the leadership of Fr Prior Marcos Dworschak.
- Camuri Chaco: In possession of the Missionary Benedictines since 1948, the Abbey of Güigüe has leased out this land since 1988.

== Personnel ==
Like many religious communities, Güigüe Abbey has experienced a significant decrease in vocations since the Second Vatican Council. In 1970, the community's population peaked at 54 professed monks. As of May 18, 2011, Güigüe Abbey has ten solemnly professed monks, four of whom are priests. The monastery also has two novices and one lay oblate

Güigüe Abbey is governed by Abbot José María Martínez Barrera. Elected as the community's second abbot in 1982, he resigned his leadership position in 2002. From 2007 to 2011, he acted as the community's prior administrator. Martínez Barrera was reelected abbot on January 11, 2011.

== See also ==
- Congregation of Missionary Benedictines of Saint Ottilien
- Order of Saint Benedict
