= Güigüe =

- Location within Venezuela
- Coordinates: 10°05′N 67°47′W
- Country: Venezuela
- State: Carabobo
- Municipality: Carlos Arvelo Municipality
- Founded: 1724

Government
  - Type: Mayor–council
  - Body: Parroquia Guigue
  - Mayor: Angel Bilbao Santoyo (PSUV)

Area
  - Total: 114 km^{2} (44 sq mi)
- Elevation: 667 m (2,188 ft)

Population (2005)
  - Total: 60,000
  - Density: 530/km^{2} (1,400/sq mi)
- Time zone: UTC−4 (VET)
- Climate: Aw
- Website: alcaldiadecarlosarvelo.gob.ve

Güigüe (pronounced Gwigwe) is a city in the south of the Valencia Lake, in Carabobo, Venezuela. It is the capital of the Carlos Arvelo Municipality and of the Güigüe parish. The Güigüe River flows through the city, draining in Lake Valencia.

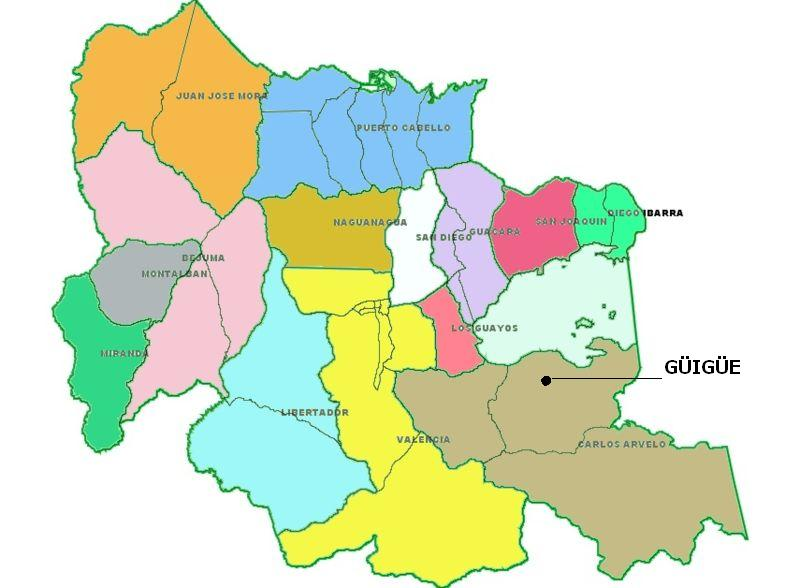
Güigüe in Carabobo

== Etymology ==
According to the Venezuelan polygraph Dr. Lisandro Alvarado, the etymology of Güigüe comes from the indigenous Caribbean toponymy "UIUE", which means axe, or thunderstone, origin attributable to the indigenous people of the contours of the Lake of Tacarigua or Valencia.

== History ==
The origin Güigüe, until now, has remained uncertain, but most historians say that Güigüe was founded in 1724, in the church of Our Lady of Rosary the oldest book found by Bishop Mariano Martí is a parish record book that was from 1724, when the parish was served by a priest named Cura Capellán. And this book was written on its front page in calligraphy the following sentence: "3 de mayo de 1724 en el valle de Nuestra Señora del Rosario de Güigüe" (May 3rd, 1724 in the Valley of Our Lady of the Rosary of Güigüe). On the other hand, Don Torcuato Manzo Núñez, who in his book "Historia del estado Carabobo", cites that Güigüe was founded in 1747.

== Geography ==
Güigüe is located in the central region of Venezuela in the state of Carabobo. It is south of Lake Valencia, 151 km southwest of Caracas. Its lowest elevation is 445 m and its highest elevation is 667 m. The closest cities to Güigüe are Tacarigua (15.3 km west), San Joaquin (20.2 km north), Guacara (23.7 km northwest), Mariara (23.8 km northeast), and Valencia (25.3 km northwest). The nearest airports are Arturo Michelena International Airport in Valencia (17.9 km northwest) and Mariscal Sucre Airport in Maracay (23.4 km northeast). The limits of the Municipality of Güigüe are, north: Lake of Valencia, with the islands El Burro, Caiguire, Otama, El Fraile. South: la serranía de Cerro Azul, east: the state of Aragua, west: the Tacarigua parish of the Carlos Arvelo municipality.

== Demographics ==
As of 2005, the urban parish of Güigüe has a little bit over 60,000 inhabitants.

Historical population
Year	Pop.	Change %
1990	45339	
1991	46546	+2.7%
1992	47747	+2.6%
1993	48940	+2.5%
1994	50124	+2.4%
1995	51302	+2.4%
1996	52471	+2.3%
1997	53631	+2.2%
1998	54781	+2.1%
1999	55921	+2.1%
2000	57043	+2.0%
2005	62464	+9.5%

== Tourism ==
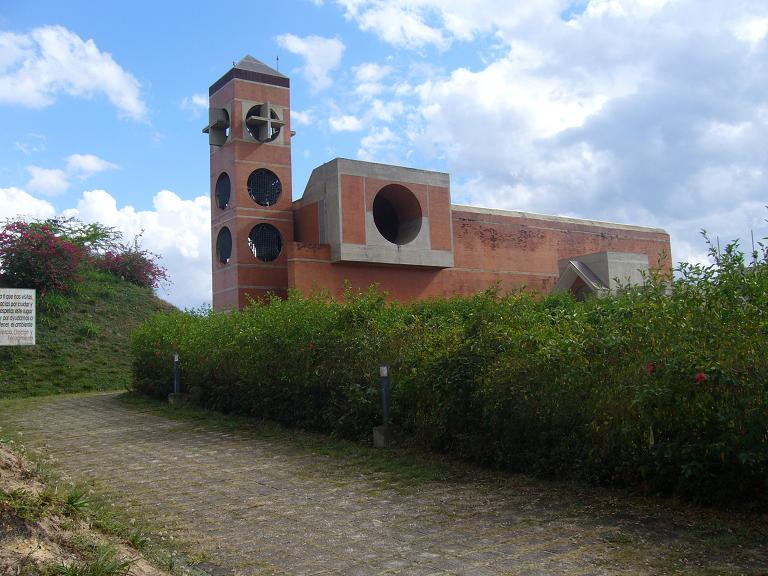
Benedictine church of Güigüe

- Benedictine Abbey of Saint Joseph, Güigüe: this monastery is famous for its architecture as well as its Gregorian chants and the agricultural products it offers.
- Plaza Arvelo and Chapel of the Savior of the World, it has the bronze bust of the eponymous, inaugurated in October 1962, on the occasion of the centenary of the death of Carlos Arvelo. In the temple located in front of it, contains the adolescent image of Jesus, Salvador del Mundo (Savior of the world), he is celebrated on January 1 of each year.
- Casa de la Cultura, Cultural building, where there is the artistic pictures of local painters and painters from the central region of Venezuela. But lately it has been discovered that "Casa de la Cultura" is abandoned since it is not being funded or getting aid from the municipality of Carlos Arvelo even though a meeting was arranged between Leonardo Crociata, president of the cultural institution and Raúl Bracamonte, mayor of Carlos Arvelo where he said that in the talks it was agreed to grant due encouragement to the arts and culture. Plus props, furniture, paint materials have been stolen.

== Notable people ==
- Dr. Carlos Arvelo - Military Surgeon

== See also ==
- List of cities and towns in Venezuela
