= Elián Herrera =

Elián Herrera may refer to:

- Elián Herrera (baseball) (born 1985), Dominican Republic baseball player
- Elián Herrera (model) (born 1991), Venezuelan model, beauty pageant titleholder and volleyball player
