= Miss Venezuela 2012 =

59th edition of the Miss Venezuela competition

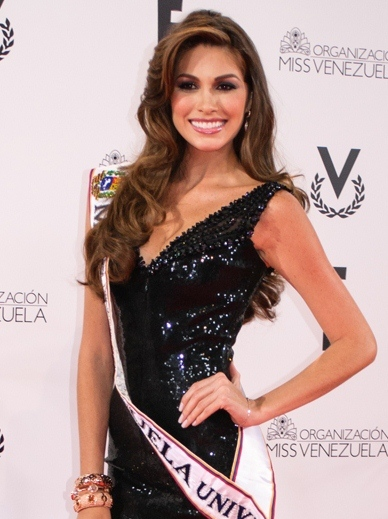
- Gabriela Isler
- Date: August 30, 2012
- Presenters: Leonardo Villalobos; Mariángel Ruiz; Eglantina Zingg; Ismael Cala
- Entertainment: Prince Royce; Olga Tañón; Karina; Víctor Drija; George Akram
- Venue: Salón Naiguatá, Hotel Tamanaco Intercontinental, Caracas, Venezuela
- Broadcaster: Venevisión; Venevisión Plus; DirecTV; Univision
- Entrants: 24
- Placements: 10
- Winner: Gabriela Isler; Guárico
- Congeniality: Claudia Baratta (Mérida)
- Photogenic: Claudia Baratta (Mérida)

Miss Venezuela 2012 was the 59th edition of the Miss Venezuela pageant, held at the Salón Naiguatá, Hotel Tamanaco Intercontinental in Caracas, Venezuela, on August 30, 2012.

Irene Esser crowned Gabriela Isler of Guárico as her successor at the end of the event.

== Results ==
=== Placements ===
Color key

- Declared as Winner
- Ended as Runner-up
- Ended as one of the Finalists or Semi-finalists

Placement	Contestant	International Placement
Miss Venezuela 2012	Guárico – Gabriela Isler	Miss Universe 2013
Miss Venezuela International 2012	Aragua – Elián Herrera	Unplaced
Miss Venezuela Earth 2012	Falcon – Alyz Henrich	Miss Earth 2013
1st runner-up	Táchira – Ivanna Vale	Reina Internacional del Café 2013
2nd runner-up	Yaracuy – María Julia Alvarez	
Top 10	Amazonas – Hylenne Báez; Bolívar – Keilys Rivero; Cojedes – Milunay Freites; Guajira Peninsula – Rocireé Silva Δ; Miranda – Oriana Lucchesse	

Δ Winner of popular voting by internet.

=== Special awards ===
Award	Contestant
Miss Photogenic	Mérida – Claudia Baratta
Miss Elegance	Guárico – Gabriela Isler
Miss Congeniality	Mérida – Claudia Baratta
Best Evening Gowns	Carabobo – María Luisa Zerpa (designed by Alejandro Fajardo); Guajira Peninsula – Rocireé Silva (designed by Hugo Espina); Yaracuy – María Julia Alvarez (designed by Gionni Straccia)

=== Gala Interactiva de la Belleza (Interactive Beauty Gala) ===
This preliminary event took place on August 11, 2012 at the Estudio 1 de Venevisión, co-hosted by Erika de la Vega and Mariela Celis. The following awards were given:

Award	Contestant
Miss Integral Beauty	Falcón – Alyz Henrich
Most Beautiful Hair	Guajira Peninsula – Rocireé Silva
Miss Interactive	Portuguesa – Nerys Díaz
Most Natural	Mérida – Claudia Baratta
Miss Personality	Zulia – Noedy Olivares
Most Beautiful Skin	Distrito Capital – Daniela Chalbaud
Best Presence	Barinas – María Teresa Solano
Most Beautiful Face	Miranda – Oriana Lucchesse
Most Beautiful Smile	Lara – Vicmary Rivero

== Contestants ==
Twenty-four contestants competed for the title.

State	Contestant	Age	Hometown	Notes
Amazonas	Hylenne Lyanne Báez Flores	20	Tumeremo	
Anzoátegui	Yoelys Adriana Escalante Salas	19	San Cristóbal	
Apure	Mariana Carolina Romero Pérez	21	Caracas	Later second place at Miss Latinoamérica 2014
Aragua	Nicelín Elián Herrera Vásquez	21	Maracay	Later unplaced at Miss International 2013
Barinas	María Teresa Solano Lobo	21	Caracas	Previously second place at Reinado Internacional del Trópico 2012
Bolívar	Keilys del Carmen Rivero Rosillo	22	Puerto Ordaz	
Carabobo	María Luisa Zerpa Lera	22	Valencia	
Cojedes	Milunay Freites Hull	20	Ciudad Ojeda	Later won Miss World Next Top Model 2015
Distrito Capital	Daniela Xanadú Chalbaud Maldonado	21	Caracas	Previously won Miss Intercontinental 2012
Falcon	Alyz Sabimar Henrich Ocando	21	Punto Fijo	Later won Miss Earth 2013
Guajira Peninsula	Rocireé del Carmen Silva Fernandez	24	Sinamaica	
Guárico	María Gabriela de Jesús Isler Morales	24	Maracay	Later won Miss Universe 2013
Lara	Vicmary Alejandra Rivero Rodríguez	19	Barquisimeto	Top 12 semi-finalist at Miss América Latina 2014
Mérida	Claudia Baratta Sarcinelli	24	San Cristóbal	
Miranda	Oriana Lucchese Baez	19	Valencia	
Monagas	Angela Karli Osmaira Ducallín Spadavecchia	23	Maracay	
Nueva Esparta	Fabiola del Valle Castillo Marcano	23	Puerto Ordaz	
Portuguesa	Nerys Margarita Díaz Ramirez	23	Maracaibo	Previously first runner-up at Reina Mundial del Banano 2012
Sucre	Ingrid Karina Smith Quijada	25	Puerto Ordaz	
Táchira	Ivanna Mariam Vale Colman	20	San Cristóbal	Later won Reinado Internacional del Café 2013
Trujillo	Desireé Coromoto Zambrano Sosa	18	San Cristóbal	
Vargas	Fanny Orián Moreno León	25	La Guaira	
Yaracuy	María Julia Alvarez Lera	24	Valencia	
Zulia	Noedy Carolina Olivares Gómez	20	Cabimas	
