= Gabriela Isler =

Venezuelan beauty pageant titleholder

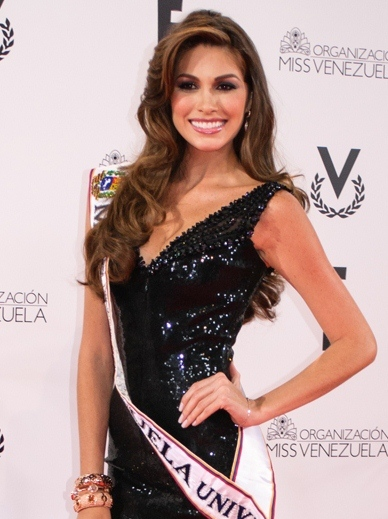
- Isler in 2013
- Born: María Gabriela de Jesús Isler Morales; 21 March 1988 (age 38); Valencia, Carabobo, Venezuela
- Occupation: Director of Miss Venezuela (2018–present)
- Height: 5 ft 10 in (178 cm)
- Beauty pageant titleholder
- Title: Miss Venezuela 2012; Miss Universe 2013
- Major competitions: Miss Venezuela 2012; (Winner); Miss Universe 2013; (Winner)

María Gabriela de Jesús Isler Morales (Spanish pronunciation: [ɡaˈβɾjela isˈleɾ]; born 21 March 1988) is a Venezuelan beauty pageant titleholder who gained international recognition by winning the titles of Miss Venezuela 2012 and Miss Universe 2013.

She passed on her Miss Universe crown in early 2015. Following her reign, Isler accepted a proposal from Donald Trump to work with the Miss Universe Organization as the organization's business and export manager for two years.

== Early life ==
Gabriela Isler was born in Valencia, Venezuela, but moved to Maracay, as a child. She is the daughter of Juan Guillermo Isler (1957) from Caracas, the son of Swiss parents who emigrated from Lausanne and Schaffhausen to Venezuela in the 1950s, where part of his family still lives (Gabriela also has German ancestry through them), and Emperatriz Josefina Morales (1962) from Maracay, who, like María Gabriela, has a degree in Management, with a BA on Marketing, from the Universidad Tecnológica del Centro. She has one sister, Karen Alejandra (1981), and two half-siblings, Karl Wilhelm (1999) and Jeandra Victoria Nidibeth Isler (2003). Her paternal surname, Isler (Ißler), means "ironmonger" in German. At age 14, she started modeling as a way to cheer her mother and grandmother up after her aunt died. One of María Gabriela's first jobs in her youth was wrapping gifts.

Since April 17, 2018, she has been a member of the Executive Committee of the Miss Venezuela Organization, along with two other Venezuelan misses, Jacqueline Aguilera and Nina Sicilia, following the sudden retirement of Osmel Sousa, the organization's former president of 38 years. Isler serves as the Director of Public Relations and Training for Miss Venezuela, heading the pageant.

== Career ==
As Miss Venezuela 2012, Isler represented the state of Guárico, where she won the title. She then went on to represent Venezuela in the Miss Universe 2013 pageant in Moscow, Russia, where she became the seventh Venezuelan to win the Miss Universe crown. During her reign, she traveled extensively and participated in numerous charity and promotional events.

In addition to her pageantry career, Isler has worked in media, hosting the Miss Venezuela 2014 pageant and serving as a spokesperson for various social campaigns.

Isler became the founder of the "Universe of Blessings Fund", a charity organization dedicated to helping educate adolescents in Venezuela.

== Personal life ==
On August 20, 2011, she began a relationship with businessman Alberto Daniel Figueroa from Táchira. On June 13, 2017, she announced that they had gotten engaged in March of that year; on a trip to the Los Roques Archipelago for her 29th birthday. On March 23, 2018, they married in Pampatar. On March 21, 2021, her 33rd birthday, she announced her first pregnancy. On April 19, she revealed that it would be a boy and on October 1, Joaquín was born in Valencia, Venezuela. On February 9, 2025, she announced that she was pregnant again. On February 12 of that same year, she revealed on Shirley Varnagy radio program "Shirley Radio" that she had suffered a miscarriage in 2024. On February 16, she revealed that she was having a girl and on August 9, Carlota was born in Valencia.

Awards and achievements
Preceded by (United States) Olivia Culpo	Miss Universe; 2013	Succeeded by (Colombia) Paulina Vega
Preceded by Irene Esser, Sucre	Miss Venezuela; 2012	Succeeded by Migbelis Castellanos, Zulia
Preceded by Blanca Aljibes	Miss Guárico; 2012	Succeeded by Michelle Bertolini
