= Mariara =

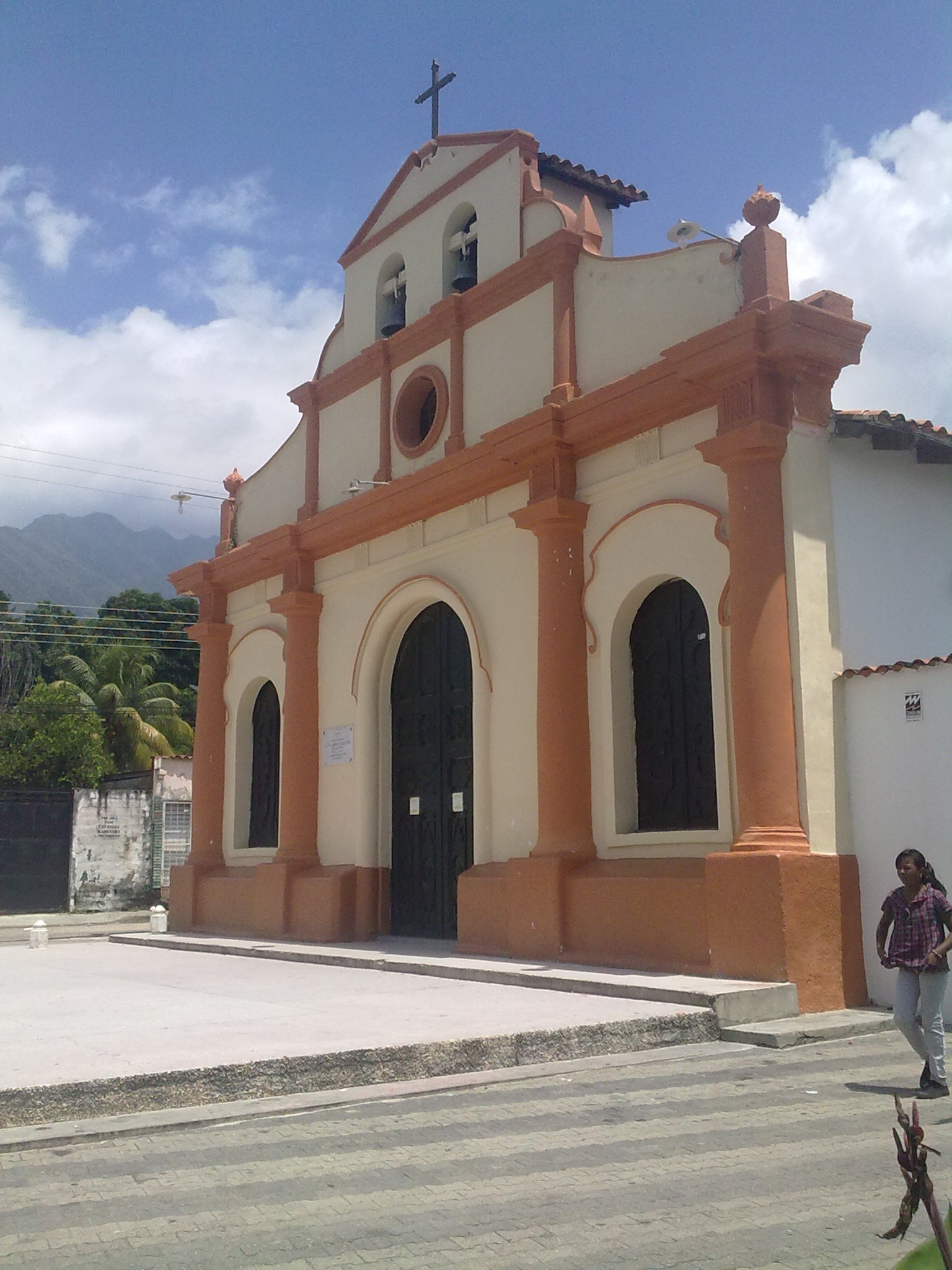

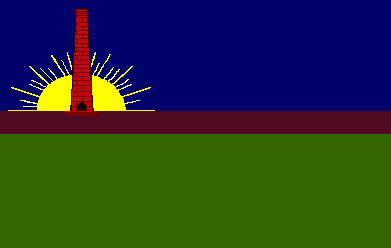
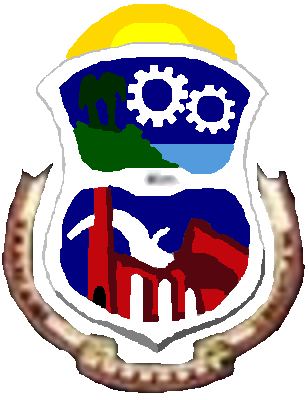
- Flag Coat of arms

- Location within Venezuela
- Coordinates: 10°17′37″N 67°42′40″W
- Country: Venezuela
- State: Carabobo
- Municipality: Diego Ibarra Municipality
- Founded: 3 December 1781
- Elevation: 454 m (1,490 ft)

Population (2010)
  - Total: 115,515
  - Demonym: Mariareño/a Mariarense
- Time zone: UTC−4 (VET)
- Postal code: 2017
- Area code: 0243
- Climate: Aw

Mariara is a city in Carabobo State, Venezuela, the shire town of the Diego Ibarra Municipality. It was founded by bishop Mariano Marti on 3 December 1781.

== History ==
Europeans found Carib tribes when they arrived to this region in the middle of the 16th century. Conquistador Vicente Díaz explored the area around 1555 and fought against some Native Americans around Mariara.

During the Colony, the Tovar family had large plantations here. Bishop Mariano Martí founded Mariara officially on 3 December 1781. Alexander von Humboldt visited in 1800.

The Ayundamiento de Valencia was created in 1810, comprising nine regions: Valencia, Los Guayos, Puerto Cabello, Ocumare de la Costa, Turmero, Guacara, Güigüe, Maracay and Mariara.

== Geography ==
=== Climate ===
Climate data for Mariara
Month	Jan	Feb	Mar	Apr	May	Jun	Jul	Aug	Sep	Oct	Nov	Dec	Year
Mean daily maximum °C (°F)	29.3 (84.7)	29.8 (85.6)	30.6 (87.1)	30.3 (86.5)	29.3 (84.7)	28.1 (82.6)	27.7 (81.9)	28.2 (82.8)	28.6 (83.5)	29.2 (84.6)	29.0 (84.2)	28.9 (84.0)	29.1 (84.4)
Daily mean °C (°F)	22.7 (72.9)	23.1 (73.6)	24.0 (75.2)	24.7 (76.5)	24.6 (76.3)	23.7 (74.7)	23.3 (73.9)	23.4 (74.1)	23.6 (74.5)	23.8 (74.8)	23.5 (74.3)	22.9 (73.2)	23.6 (74.5)
Mean daily minimum °C (°F)	15.3 (59.5)	15.4 (59.7)	16.5 (61.7)	18.3 (64.9)	18.7 (65.7)	18.4 (65.1)	17.8 (64.0)	17.7 (63.9)	17.7 (63.9)	17.7 (63.9)	17.1 (62.8)	16.1 (61.0)	17.2 (63.0)
Average precipitation mm (inches)	7.7 (0.30)	6.4 (0.25)	11.4 (0.45)	57.2 (2.25)	130.2 (5.13)	146.6 (5.77)	161.6 (6.36)	183.4 (7.22)	146.9 (5.78)	129.7 (5.11)	80.6 (3.17)	22.4 (0.88)	1,084.1 (42.68)
Average precipitation days	3.1	1.9	1.9	6.9	12.6	16.9	17.9	19.2	16.0	14.6	11.7	6.2	128.9
Average relative humidity (%)	72.4	68.9	66.4	70.6	76.2	78.7	81.7	82.2	81.6	81.3	79.6	75.9	76.3
