= Aragua River =

Coordinates: 10.17333°N 67.60472°W

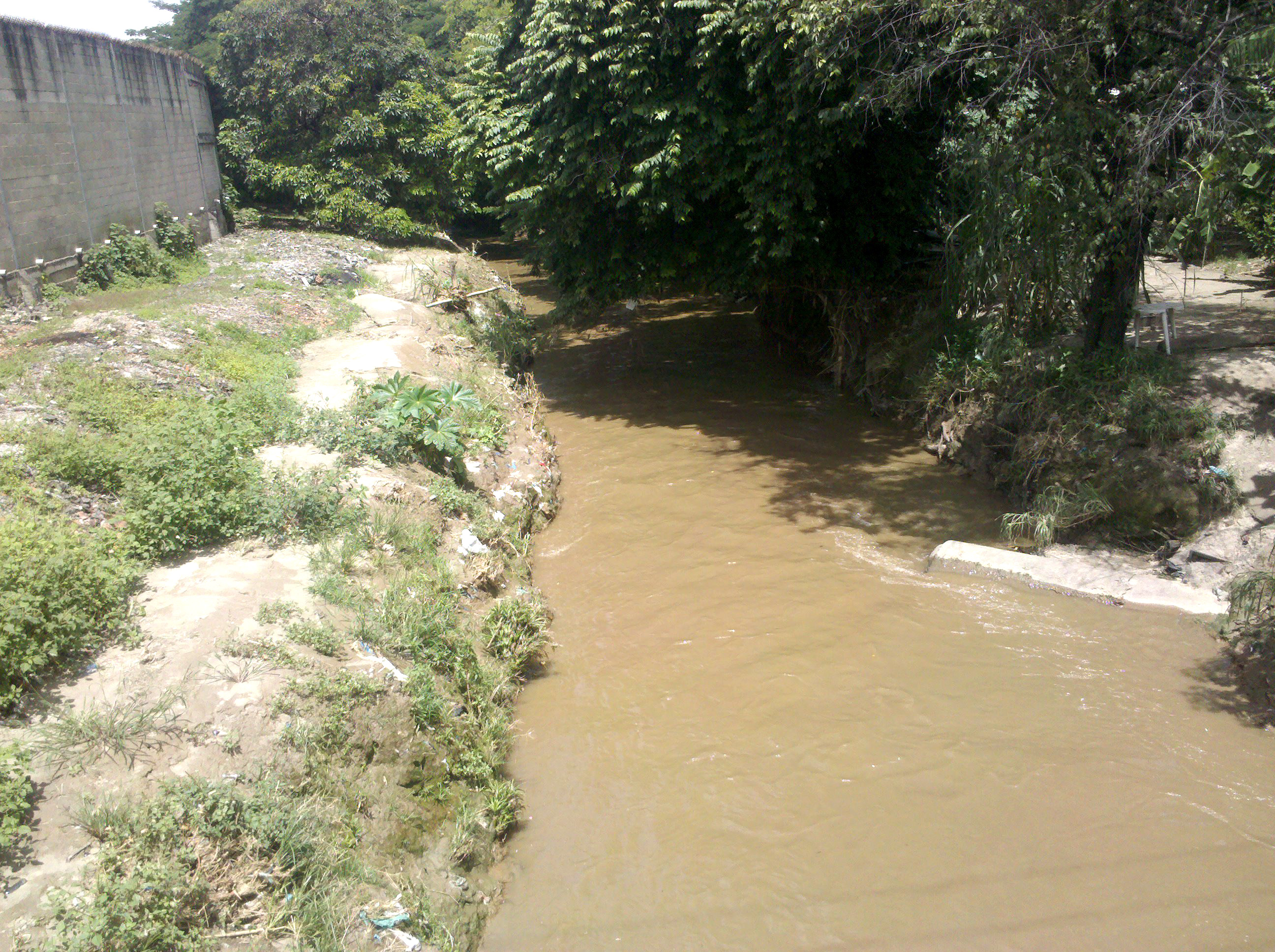

Location
- Country: Venezuela

Physical characteristics
- Mouth
  - location: Lake Valencia
- Length: 58 km (36 mi)

The Aragua River is a South America river in Aragua State, Venezuela. The river flows from the northern part of the state into the endorheic Lake Valencia, and is the lake's main tributary.

== Agriculture ==
The Aragua River irrigates a vast valley, enriching it with fertile deposits that make its soil one of the most fertile in the country. Sugarcane is the chief produce of the region, and potatoes have yielded high commercial returns. The valley is also known for crops like cacao, coffee, cotton, corn, rice, and tobacco.
