= Reinado Internacional del Café 2012 =

Reinado Internacional del Café 2012, was held in Manizales, Colombia, on January 8, 2012. 24 beauty queens competed for the title.- The winner was Ximena Vargas, from Bolivia.

== Results ==
=== Placements ===
Final results	Contestant
Reina Internacional del Café 2012	Bolivia - Ximena Vargas
Virreina Internacional del Café 2012	Colombia - Yoselín Rincón Castillo
1st Runner Up	Indonesia - Laskary Andaly Metal
2nd Runner Up	Venezuela - Gabriella Ferrari
3rd Runner Up	Brazil - Aline Reis

== Special awards ==
Award	Contestant
Queen of Police	Costa Rica - Fabiana Granados; Bolivia - Ximena Vargas; Venezuela - Gabriella Ferrari; Spain - Meriem Mustafá; Brazil - Aline Sales Dos Reis
Best Face	Bolivia - Ximena Vargas
Best Hair	Indonesia - Laskary Andaly
Chica Cheers	Venezuela - Gabriella Ferrari

== Official Contestants ==
Country	Contestant	Age	Height (cm)	Height (ft)	Hometown
Argentina	Bárbara Soledad Saavedra	21	175	5'9"	Campana
Bahamas	Keriann Brittney Stuart	17	168	5'6"	Freeport
Bolivia	Ximena Vargas Parada	25	175	5'9"	Santa Cruz
Brazil	Aline Sales Dos Reis	24	175	5'9"	Belém
Canada	Emily Ann Kiss	25	174	5'8.5"	Windsor
Colombia	Yoselín Rincón Castillo	19	172	5'7.5"	Cartagena
Costa Rica	Fabiana Granados Herrera	21	172	5'8"	Guanacaste
Dominican Republic	Catherine Mabel Ramírez Rosario	25	173	5'8"	Santiago
Ecuador	María Lissette Cedeño Gómez	24	172	5'7.5"	Guayaquil
El Salvador	Cindy Madai Guzmán Aguilar	23	174	5'8.5"	Nejapa
Germany	Johanna Acs	19	175	5'9"	Eschweiler
Honduras	Bessy Beatriz López Ochoa	17	173	5'8"	Choloma
Indonesia	Laskary Andaly Metal Bitticaca	25	175	5'9"	Sorowako
Mexico	Silvia Edith Espinoza Sánchez	19	170	5'7"	Villahermosa
Panama	Edith Noemí Díaz Córdoba	23	174	5'8.5"	Las Tablas
Paraguay	Clara Silvana Carrillo Gossen	22	170	5'7"	Horqueta
Peru	Sharley Catheryne Torres	25	175	5'9"	Trujillo
Poland	Justyna Katarzyna Karlowska	20	174	5'8.5"	Mrowiska
Portugal	Patrícia Carvalho de Oliveira	21	177	5'9.5"	Zürich
Puerto Rico	Sulis Marie Matos Reyes	20	178	5'10"	Bayamón
Spain	Meriem Mustafá Mohamed	24	178	5'10"	Ceuta
United States	Lili Dorotea Fifield	22	175	5'9"	San Diego
Uruguay	Cinthia Micaela Amorín Pereira	20	172	5'7.5"	Montevideo
Venezuela	Gabriella Ferrari Peirano	20	175	5'10"	Valencia

== Crossovers ==
Contestants who previously competed or will compete at other beauty pageants:

- Miss International 2006
  - Canada - Emily Ann Kiss
- Miss Tourism International 2009
  - Bolivia - Ximena Vargas
- Miss International 2010
  - Bolivia - Ximena Vargas
  - Germany - Johanna Acs
    - Semifinalist
- Miss World 2011
  - Honduras - Bessy Beatriz Ochoa
- Miss International 2011
  - Dominican Republic - Catherine Mabel Ramírez
- Miss Intercontinental 2011
  - Paraguay - Clara Silvana Carrillo
- Miss World 2012
  - Venezuela - Gabriela Ferrari
- Miss Coffee International 2012
  - Germany - Johanna Acs
  - Dominican Republic - Catherine Ramírez (Winner)
