= Laskary Metal =

Indonesian beauty queen (born 1986)

- Born: Laskary Andaly Metal Biticaca; 18 December 1986 (age 39); Sorowako, South Sulawesi, Indonesia
- Height: 1.75 m (5 ft 9 in)
- Beauty pageant titleholder
- Title: Putri Kopi Indonesia 2011
- Hair color: Black
- Eye color: Brown
- Major competitions: Puteri Kopi Indonesia 2011 (Winner); Reina Internacional del Café 2012 (1st Runner-up)

Laskary Andaly Metal Biticaca (born 18 December 1986) is an Indonesian beauty queen. She won the Putri Kopi Indonesia title in 2011. She is entitled to represent Indonesia at the 2012 Reina Internacional del Café pageant.

== Pageantry ==
=== Putri Kopi Indonesia 2011 ===
Biticaca, who stands 1.75 m (5 ft 9 in), competed as the representative of South Sulawesi, one of 33 finalists in her country's national beauty pageant, Putri Kopi Indonesia 2011, held in Mulia Senayan Hotel, Jakarta on April 18, 2011, where she became the eventual winner of the title. She competed in Reina Internacional del Café 2012, broadcast live from Manizales, Colombia, on January 8, 2012.

=== Reina Internacional del Café 2012 ===
She was a heavy favourite by Indonesian pageant's fans from beginning to last. She placed as the 1st runner-up, and also won Best Hair award in the pageant. She was the first Indonesian representative, and also the first Indonesian that placed among the Top 5 in this pageant. She is also the only second contestant from Asia to participate in this pageant since its inception in 1957. The first Asian delegate came from Japan in 1992, who placed as the 1st runner-up.
