= Carlos Arvelo Guevara =

Venezuelan professor and military doctor (1784–1862)

- Born: 1 June 1784; Güigüe, Viceroyalty of New Granada
- Died: 17 October 1862 (aged 78); Maiquetia, Venezuela
- Burial place: Panteón Nacional
- Education: Central University of Venezuela
- Occupation(s): Military Doctor and Politician
- Medical career
- Profession: Surgeon

Carlos Arvelo Guevara (1 June 1784 – 17 October 1862) was a professor, and the first military doctor of Venezuela, and he played an important role in establishing health services in the country. Many places were named after him, including the municipality of Carlos Arvelo and the military hospital of Carlos Arvelo in Caracas.

== Early life and education ==
He was born in the town of Güigüe on June 1, 1784, to Idelfonso Fernando de Arvelo and Eugenia de Guevara.

Despite having no financial resources, he was able to study in the Real y Pontificia Universidad de Caracas (now Central University of Venezuela), thanks to a special scholarship granted by the Board of Inspection of the university, due to his financial status and being outstanding in his studies, where he was interested in social application of scientific and clinical knowledge.

At the beginning of his medical studies he began an internship at the "Hospital General de Caridad" (General Hospital of Charity), being appointed by one of his professors, Alejandro Echezuría, and with the authorization of the Rector of the university.

When not studying, he accompanied Felipe Tamaris, his professor, who let Arvelo assist him in difficult cases.

In 1809 he graduated with a bachelor's degree in medicine. In 1810 he replaced José Joaquín Hernández, one of his professors, who had been sent to the Valleys of Aragua in the campaign against a fever epidemic that had broken out there. He completed his doctorate in medicine later that year. He recommended burning all the piles of seeds and cotton that there were in the valleys, an intervention that was successful and led to his recognition by many, especially among the inhabitants of Aragua, who entitled him "el bienhechor" (the benefactor).

== War of Independence ==
In 1810 he joined the Farmers' Squadron of the army fighting for independence from Spain, with the rank of Captain-Surgeon. He became the director of the Military Hospital of Caracas in 1811. He took part in the 1813 Battle of Vigirima, and the following year in the battle of "San Mateo" and La Victoria where he received a serious bullet wound in the thorax which made him retire from military service and practice as a surgeon in Caracas until the independence of Venezuela in 1821. Following his involvement in the war, Simon Bolivar appointed him Surgeon in Chief of the Venezuelan Army, granted by. Bolivar described the attention Arvelo offered to wounded soldiers as "impeccably humane".

== Later life ==
In 1822 he was part of a Commission in charge of studying an improvement plan for the Central University of Venezuela, along with José Vargas and other doctors. He then became leader of the reform that opened the way to the creation of the Medical Faculty of Caracas, which was achieved in 1827 by a Decree from Bolivar dated June 25 of that year, replacing the old Protomedicato founded in 1777 by Lorenzo Campins and Ballester.

In 1827 Arvelo Guevara was appointed director of the chair of Internal Pathology and Therapeutics of the Central University of Venezuela (UCV). A year later he earned the chair of Practical and Internal Medicine, in which he remained for twenty years. In addition, he was Vice Chancellor of the university in 1834 and principal director of the Faculty of Medicine the following year. In 1846 he occupied the position of Rector of the UCV. Commissioned by the National Government, in 1852 Arvelo Guevara supervised experimental research for treatment of measles during an epidemic that broke out in Venezuela. His rigorous inspection facilitated control of the disease.

== Marriage and death ==
He married Manuela Echeandía, daughter of the Colombian Colonel Manuel de Echeandía, in 1826. They had six sons, including Carlos, a doctor like his father and future rector of Caracas University. His wife died in 1861. One of his sons was killed during the war. Arvelo died on October 17, 1862, in Maiquetía. His remains were moved to the National Pantheon on 16 December 1942.

== Positions ==
- Member, together with José María Vargas, of the project of reforms of the Royal and Pontifical University of Caracas (1822)
- Co-founder of the Medical Instruction Society of Venezuela (1822)
- Vice-president of UCV (1834)
- Rector of UCV (1846)
- Senator and State counsellor (1849–1859)
- Member of the Board of Abolition of Slavery (1855)

== See also ==
- Carlos Arvelo Municipality
- Hospital Militar Dr. Carlos Arvelo
