= Cabriales River =

River in Venezuela

The Cabriales River is a river in Carabobo State, Venezuela, closely associated with the city of Valencia. It historically served as an important source of water for the city's inhabitants, agriculture, and other activities.

During two royalist sieges of Valencia in 1814, the river was the city's only water supply, and royalist forces seized control of it. In 1979, the Environment Ministry diverted the Cabriales into Lake Valencia, contributing to a rise in the lake's water level.

The river was also regarded as a regional geographical symbol and inspired works by poets, musicians, and painters.

== History ==
In 1547 the river that flowed northwest into Lake Tacarigua (today, Lake Valencia) was first seen by the expeditionary Juan de Villegas and the other men he commanded when they took possession of these lands.

Since ancient times, the cities of the far east and the old world, were founded in the vicinity of a river. This custom spread to the New World. In this way, Nueva Valencia del Rey was founded, near Lake Tacarigua, a paradisiacal reservoir of botany, animals, and life when discovered by the conquerors, bathed by a generous river, in most of the houses and in the customs and hearts of its inhabitants.

In 1814, the river had great importance because during that year, the city was besieged twice by royalist forces. These forces took the river which was the only water supply site. A Valencian heroine, María Josefa Zabaleta y Gedler, distinguished herself by risking her life, seeking water from the river to supply the patriots.

In 1818, the first bridge across the river was finished. By 1848, work on an aqueduct was completed; to the surprise of many, the ravine called "La Represa", originally in Guataparo Arriba, was inadequate for the local population of the time. In 1877 a new aqueduct called "Guzmán Blanco" was built. "Guzmán Blanco" was added to the volume of the previous stream, La Represa, that of the Luvara ravine, also originated in Guataparo Arriba. In 1888 "Guzmán Blanco" was, from the same place, the flow called Cacaíto.

In 1979, the Cabriales River was diverted by the Environment Ministry to Lake Valencia, which has contributed to the increase in its level by about 30 centimeters per year.

== Importance in Valencian history ==
Currently the Cabriales River manifests itself in Valencian society only as a hydrographic place in the area. It has relevance for some scientists and environmentalists, who try to solve, encourage and raise awareness among the people regarding the problem of the river.

To the surprise of many, the Cabriales River previously mattered and had relevance in the social life of the city, which claimed that it constituted a kind of regional geographical symbol.

During the years of Spain's conquest and colonization, to the Venezuelan coasts and after, during the War of Independence, the Cabriales River formed a point of security from assaults and piracy. It was a place favored by its distance from the sea, its vast extension and its proximity to Lake Tacarigua.

From this river, the inhabitants were supplied with water for their domestic needs and farmers and landowners for their crops and farms. Humble women turned to the river to wash their clothes and all who wanted sand, to bathe beasts and fish for pleasure or for the value of fish proteins. From its flow they perceived the daily sustenance of water vendors or haulers.

It was also relevant for the depressed and suicidal who found liberation from their sorrows and problems in the river. Towards the sunset of a date already forgotten, the inert body of Lady Zedhernán moved and impacted the citizens. Lady Zedhernán was a beautiful Valencian whose suicide in the Cabriales was the oldest suicide of which there is memory. The reason for her suicide was explained by the luxurious fan she kept tight in her hands, illustrated with a Japanese watercolor, which had been sent to her by the Liberator, named Simón Bolívar, inside an onyx case and along with a letter, the day after she met him at a dance on January 4, 1827, the last visit she made to Venezuela.

In addition to the suicidal, there were those who, while death came for them, came to the remote areas of the river to unleash their tears. A well-known example of this was the case of Enrique Linares Irigoyen, who spent many hours devoted to the memory of his son, whom he had lost. He contracted the blood disease that destroyed him within hours. This disease was the one that took the life of his son and, later, that of his daughter and that of his own father.

== The River Cabriales as a Source of Inspiration in the Arts ==
Many poets, musicians and painters have broken down literary pieces of admiration and art to the Cabriales River. Among the most outstanding painters are Leopoldo La Madriz, Braulio Salazar and Guarenas.

In the poetic genre, the following was emphasized:

- Flor Gornéz Gallegos: “Tomó un nombre sugerente, musical, dulce, una palabra que hace pensar en ondas de luz, en alegría de juventud, en risas de niños saltarines y juguetones”
- The Valencian writer José Rafal Pocaterra: "And as goats grazed there, the musical genius of words named the river the Cabriales River"
- A poem by Luis de Guevara, deceased poet, evokes a farewell, saying that he leaves the city, with his millenary sorrow, his proletarian nobility and "the dagger of his river, under its bridges"

During his term as governor of Carabobo, Henrique Salas Römer decreed the "Cabriales Festivals", which mixed music with painting.
