= Carlos Arvelo Municipality =

Carlos Arvelo Municipality Municipio Carlos Arvelo
- Municipality
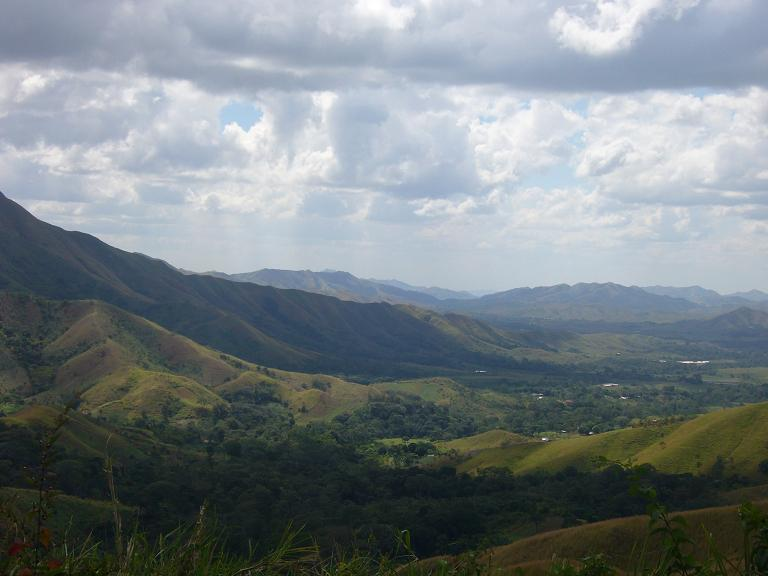

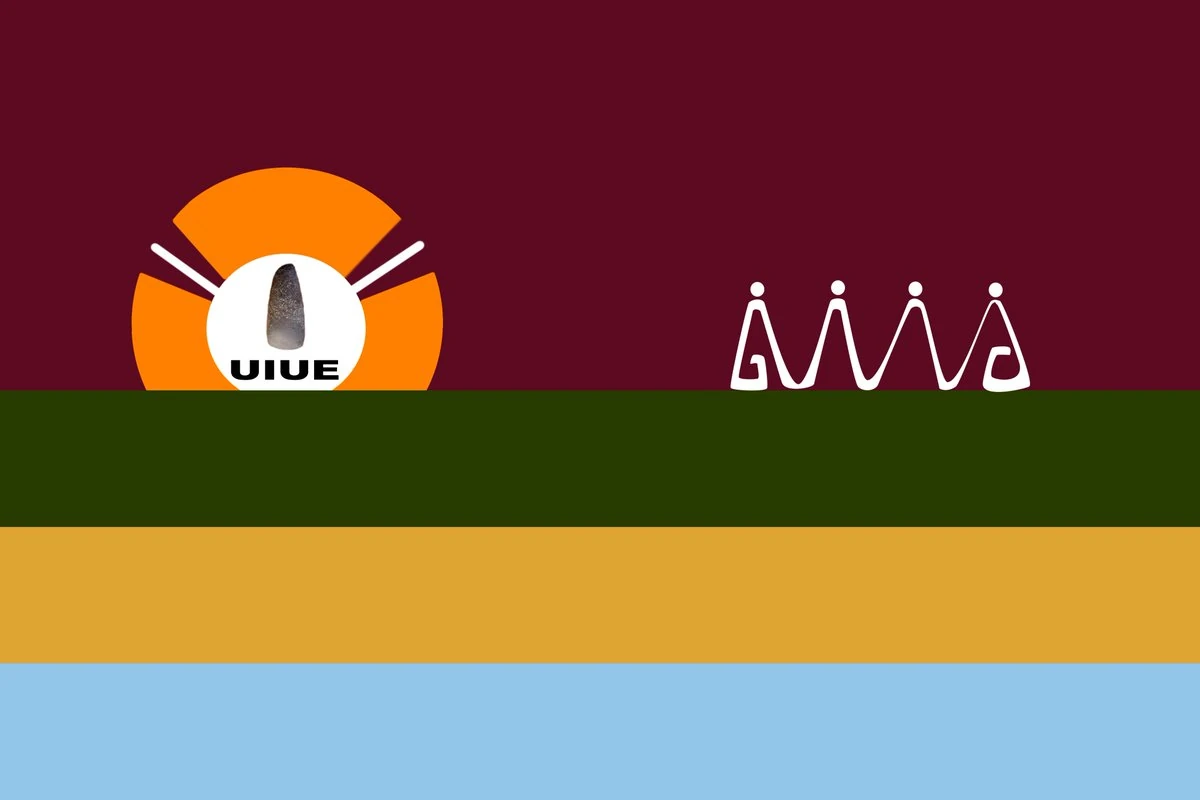
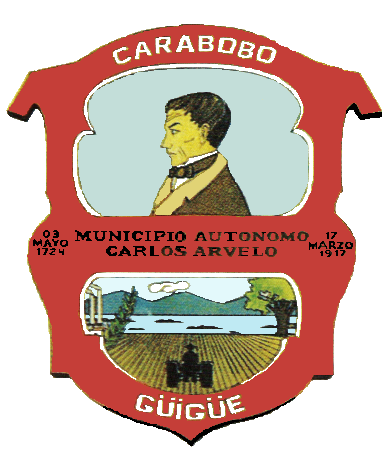
- Flag Coat of arms

- Location in Carabobo

- Location in Venezuela
- Coordinates: 10°00′05″N 67°45′39″W
- Country: Venezuela
- State: Carabobo
- Municipal seat: Güigüe

Government
  - Mayor: Angel Bilbao Santoyo (PSUV)

Area
  - Total: 1,029.0 km^{2} (397.3 sq mi)

Population (2011)
  - Total: 150,277
  - Density: 146.04/km^{2} (378.25/sq mi)
- Time zone: UTC−4 (VET)
- Area code(s): 0241
- Website: Official website

The Carlos Arvelo Municipality (named after Dr. Carlos Arvelo) is one of the 14 municipalities (municipios) that makes up the Venezuelan state of Carabobo and, according to the 2011 census by the National Institute of Statistics of Venezuela, the municipality has a population of 150,277. The town of Güigüe is the shire town of the Carlos Arvelo Municipality.

== Geography ==
The Carlos Arvelo Municipality is located in the southeastern part of Carabobo State. It is limited to the north by the Lake of Valencia and the Municipality the Guayos, to the west the Municipality of Valencia, to the South the State of Guárico and to the east the State of Aragua.

The Carlos Arvelo Municipality is integrated by the Güigüe Urban Parish (capital Güigüe) and the Belén Non-Urban Parish (capital Belen) and the Tacarigua Non-Urban Parish (capital Tacarigua). The north of the municipality is mostly plain, unlike the central and southern part of the municipality, which is mountainous.

=== Climate ===
Minimum monthly temperature in the Carlos Arvelo municipality lies between 12.3 and 22.1 °C, while maximum temperature is between 24.4 and 33.9 °C. Total annual precipitation fluctuates between 932 and 1395 mm. Most rain falls between June and August, while the driest quarter comprises January to March.

== Demographics ==
The Carlos Arvelo Municipality, according to a 2011 population estimate by the National Institute of Statistics of Venezuela, has a population of 150,277 (up from 124,344 in 2001). This amounts to 6.7% of the state's population. The municipality's population density is 180 inhabitants per square kilometre (470/sq mi).

=== By Parish ===
Population Census in 2011
Parish	Capital	Population
Güigüe Parish	Güigüe	73,276
Belén Parish	Belén	13,786
Tacarigua Parish	Tacarigua	63,215

=== By Year ===
Population by year
2011	2009	2005	2000	1999	1998	1997	1996	1995	1994	1993	1992	1991	1990
150,277	140,000	115,963	107,370	105,558	103,700	101,814	99,900	97,960	95,993	94,001	91,983	89,941	87,874

== Politics and government ==
=== Mayors ===
Term	Mayors	Political party / Alliance	% of votes
1989 - 1992	Francisco Ramón Sánchez	AD	-
1992 - 1995	Danilo Montecalvo	COPEI	-
1995 - 2000	Danilo Montecalvo	Proyecto Carabobo	-
2000 - 2004	Danilo Montecalvo	PRVZL	36,88
2004 - 2008	Marisol Castillo de Castellano	MVR	30,40
2008 - 2013	Marisol Castillo de Castellano	PSUV	49,16
2013 - 2017	Raúl Álvarez	PSUV	59,96
2017 - 2021	Yomar Alvarado	PSUV	85,17

=== Municipality council ===
Term 2013-2017

Councilors	Political Party / Alliance
América Martínez	PSUV
Herict García	PSUV
Yorman Alvarado	PSUV
Diego Villazana	PSUV
Alciviades Franco	PSUV
Custodio Nieves	PSUV
Carmen Tahuanipano	PSUV
Franklin García	PSUV
Julio Acosta	PSOEV

== See also ==
- Municipalities of Venezuela
