= Guacara River =

Location
- Country: Venezuela

The Guacara River is a river of Venezuela. It drains into Lake Valencia.

== See also ==
- List of rivers of Venezuela
