= Diego Ibarra Municipality =

Diego Ibarra Municipality Municipio Diego Ibarra
- Municipality
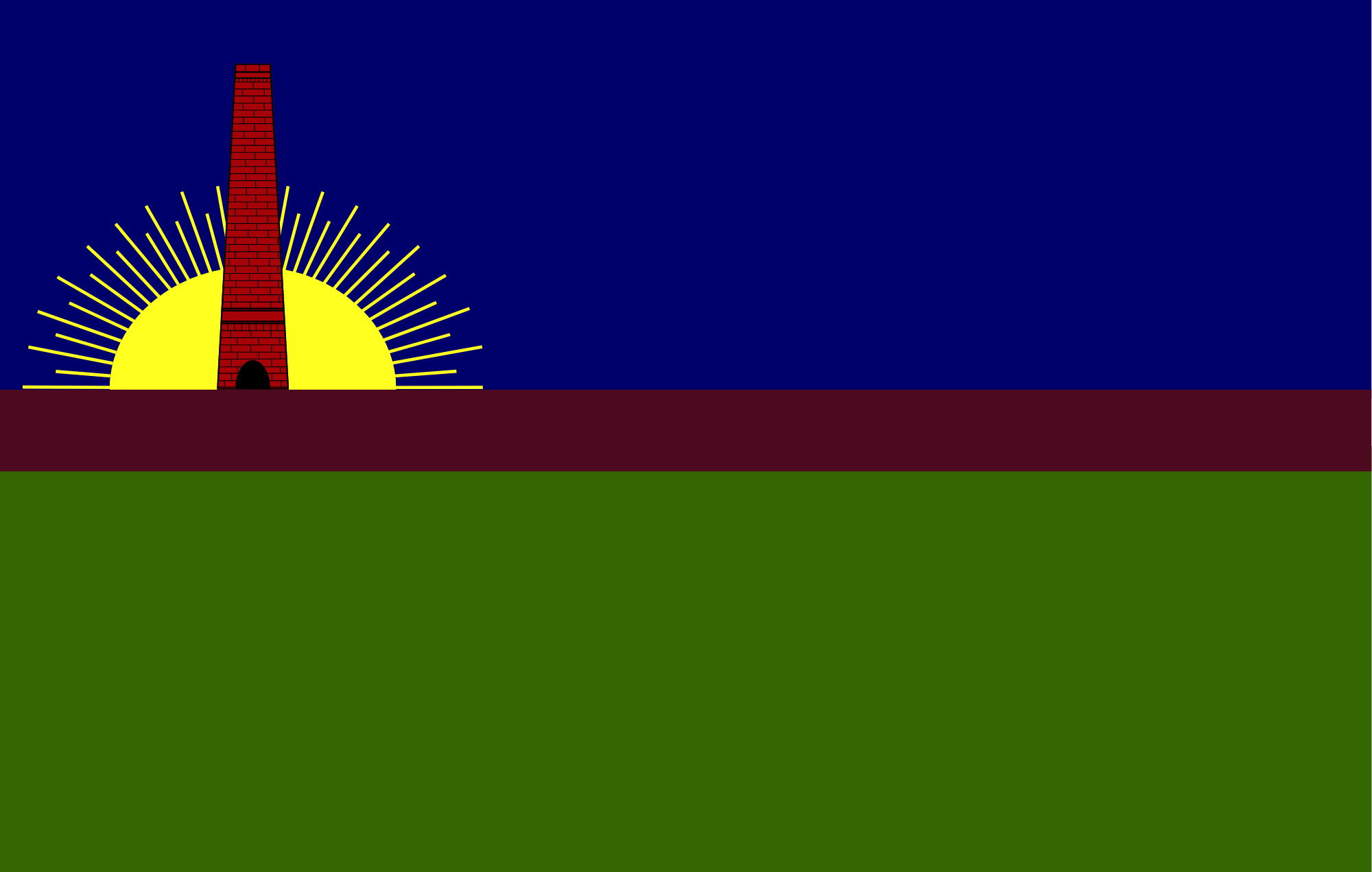
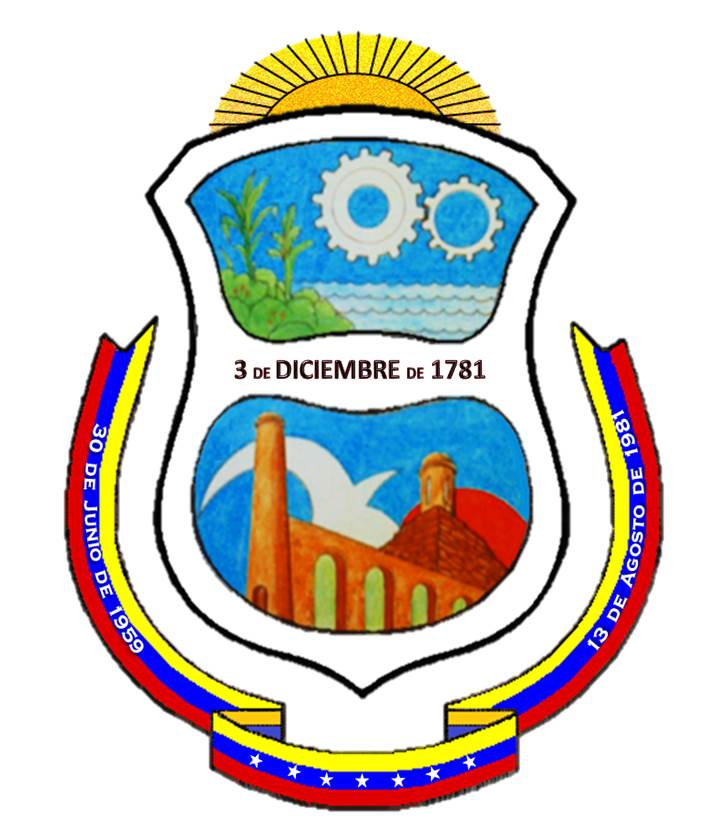
- Flag Coat of arms

- Location in Carabobo

- Location in Venezuela
- Coordinates: 10°17′35″N 67°42′01″W
- Country: Venezuela
- State: Carabobo
- Municipal seat: Mariara

Government
  - Mayor: Lesbia Castillo Gutiérrez (PSUV)

Area
  - Total: 79 km^{2} (31 sq mi)

Population (2011)
  - Total: 104,536
  - Density: 1,300/km^{2} (3,400/sq mi)
- Time zone: UTC−4 (VET)
- Area code(s): 0243

The Diego Ibarra Municipality is one of the 14 municipalities (municipios) that makes up the Venezuelan state of Carabobo and, according to the 2011 census by the National Institute of Statistics of Venezuela, the municipality has a population of 104,536. The town of Mariara is the shire town of the Diego Ibarra Municipality.

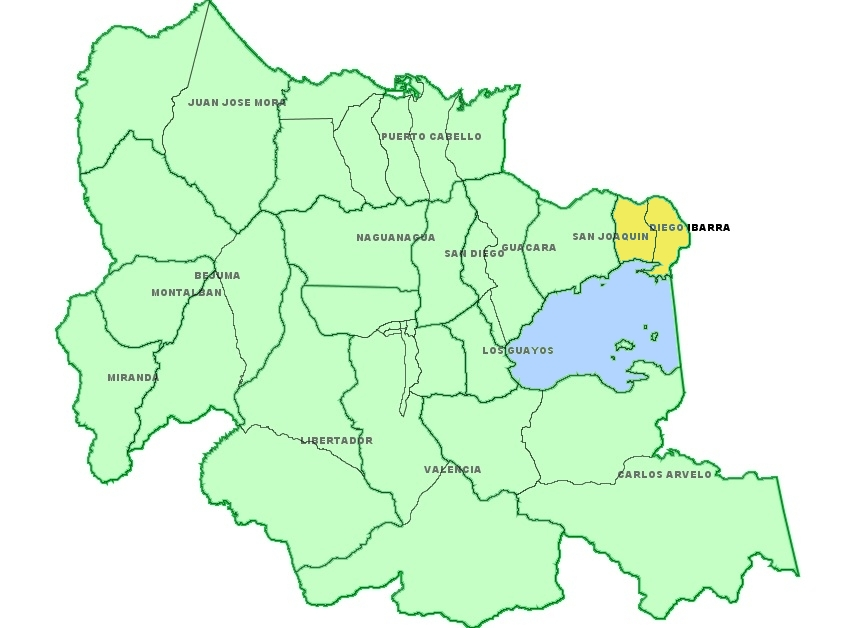
Diego Ibarra

Territorial political division of D. Ibarra Municipality, Carabobo State, Venezuela: Mariara Urban Parish and Aguas Calientes Urban Parish

== Demographics ==
The Diego Ibarra Municipality, according to a 2007 population estimate by the National Institute of Statistics of Venezuela, has a population of 110,131 (up from 96,983 in 2000). This amounts to 4.9% of the state's population. The municipality's population density is 1,394.06 inhabitants per square kilometre (3,610.6/sq mi).

== Government ==
The mayor of the Diego Ibarra Municipality is Roger Martinez, elected on November 23, 2008, with 50% of the vote. He replaced Rafael Ruiz Manrique shortly after the elections. The municipality is divided into two parishes; Aguas Calientes and Mariara.

== See also ==
- Municipalities of Venezuela
