= Carla Field =

Venezuelan TV host

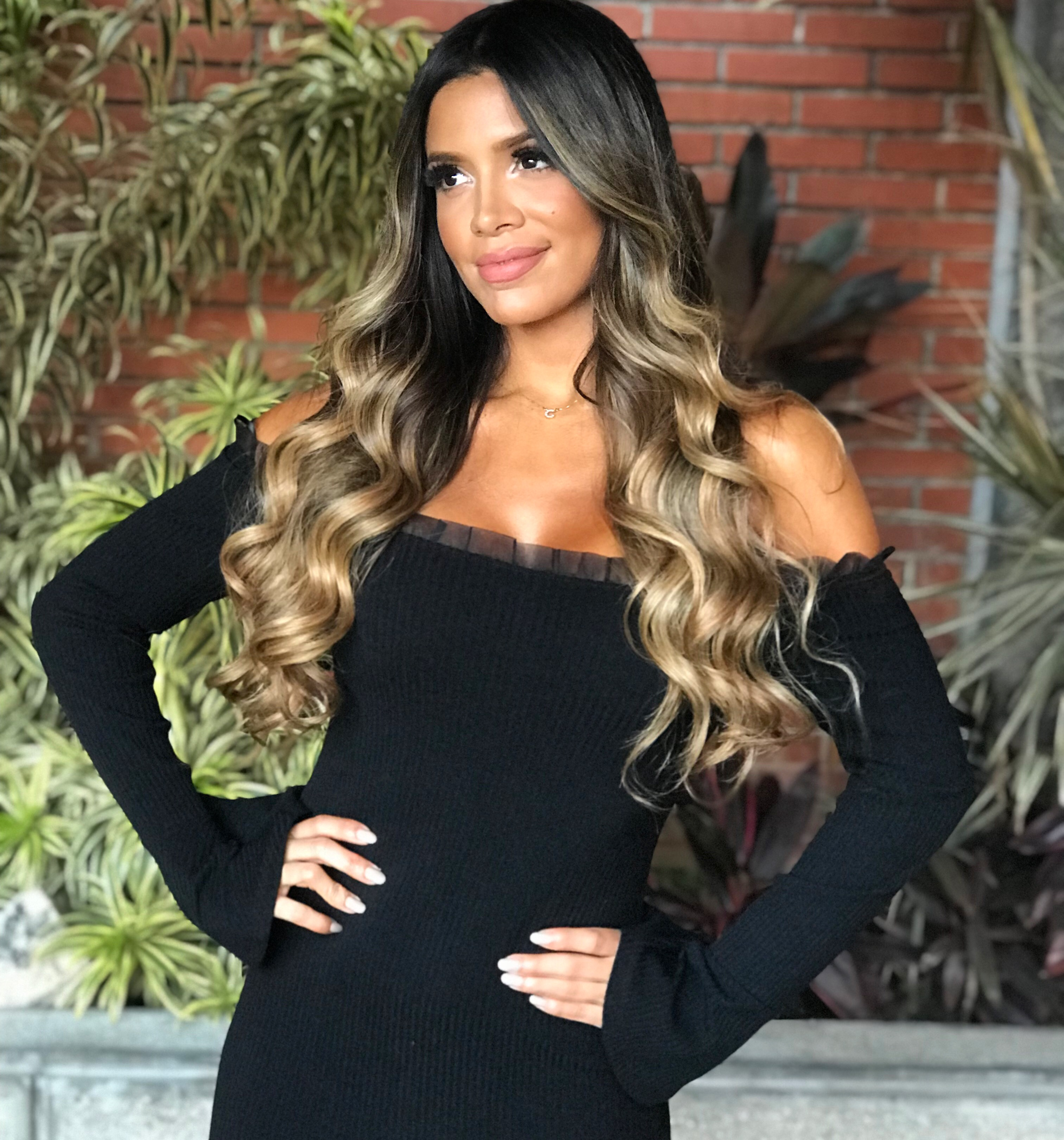
- Born: Carla Cristina Field Rondón; August 2, 1991 (age 34); Maracaibo, Zulia, Venezuela
- Occupations: Television host, model, fashion blogger, actress
- Spouse: Andrés Ruíz (m. 2013; div. 2016) José Miguel Urrutia (m. 2022)
- Children: 1
- Parent(s): Carlos Field; Celis Rondón

Carla Cristina Field Rondón (born August 2, 1991) is a Venezuelan television host, model, fashion blogger, and actress. She gained national recognition after her participation in the XLIII Feria de la Chinita beauty pageant.

Field began her television career in August 2009 as a co-host of the primetime entertainment news show La bomba on Televen. She later hosted the comedy prank show Tas Pilla'o on the same network. In 2016, she returned to co-host La Bomba, remaining with the program until August 2017.

In 2018, Field was selected to be one of the Chicas Polar, serving as a brand ambassador and model for Empresas Polar.

== Personal life ==
Field's parents are Carlos Field and Celis Rondón.

In August 2013, she married plastic surgeon Andrés Ruíz in a civil ceremony, with the religious ceremony taking place in September. In January 2015, she experienced a miscarriage of twins. The couple divorced in 2016.

On April 26, 2019, she announced her engagement to José Miguel Urrutia. They were married in a civil ceremony in Austin, Texas, on May 13, 2022, with a reception held on June 19 in Round Top, Texas. On July 22, 2023, Field announced she was pregnant. Their son, Federico Urrutia Field, was born on January 29, 2024.

== TV Hosting ==
Year	Show/Event	Role	Chanel
2009 - 2014	La bomba	Lead co-host	Televen
2014 - 2016	Tas Pilla'o	Lead co-host	Televen
2016 - 2017	La bomba	Lead co-host	Televen
