= Reinado Internacional del Café 2013 =

Reinado Internacional del Café 2013, was held in Manizales, Colombia, on January 12, 2013. 23 beauty queens competed for the title. The winner was Ivanna Vale, from Venezuela.

== Results ==
=== Placements ===
Placement	Contestant
Reina Internacional del Café 2013	Venezuela – Ivanna Vale
Virreina Internacional del Café 2013	Colombia – Claudy Blandón
1st Runner-Up	Dominican Republic – Melody Mir
2nd Runner-Up	Aruba – Larisa Leeuwe
3rd Runner-Up	Honduras – Jennifer Valle

== Special awards ==
Award	Contestant
Queen of Police	Brazil – Andressa Mello; Colombia – Claudy Blandón; Peru – Claudia Manrique; Puerto Rico – Mara Liz Rivera; Dominican Republic – Melody Mir
Best Face	Honduras – Jennifer Valle

== Official exhibits ==
Country	Contestant	Age	Height (cm)	Height (ft)	Hometown
Argentina	María Belén Fernández Coutiño	25	171	5'7.5"	Corrientes
Aruba	Larisa Anna Maria Leeuwe	21	174	5'8.5"	Oranjestad
Bahamas	Kristie Antonia Farah	19	171	5'7.5"	Nassau
Bolivia	Adriana Rivera Benítez	22	173	5'8"	Tarija
Brazil	Andressa Simone Dos Santos de Mello	23	180	5'11"	Ijuí
Canada	Chelsea Bird	24	177	5'9.5"	Saskatoon
Colombia	Claudy Jessy Blandón Romaña	24	179	5'10.5"	Quibdó
Costa Rica	Mariela Barrantes Benavides	23	176	5'9.5"	San José
Dominican Republic	Melody Mir Jiménez	23	177	5'10.5"	Santo Domingo
Ecuador	Katherine Elizabeth Espín Gómez	20	172	5'7.5"	La Troncal
El Salvador	Martha Marina Aguirre Mendoza	18	170	5'7"	San Salvador
Germany	Romy Krawczyk	21	177	5'9.5"	Berlin
Haiti	Anedie Lucrece Azael	24	178	5'10"	Port au Prince
Honduras	Jennifer Gisselle Valle Morel	18	174	5'8.5"	Tegucigalpa
Mexico	Alejandra Balderas Flores	21	173	5'8"	Villahermosa
Paraguay	Mónica Mariani Pascualoto	20	173	5'8"	Salto del Guaira
Peru	Claudia Francesca Manrique López	18	175	5'9"	Lima
Portugal	Indira Patrícia Santos Ferreira	21	171	5'7.5"	Angola
Puerto Rico	Mara Liz Rivera Ramos	21	173	5'8"	Mayagüez
Spain	Beatriz Ortega Loro	23	178	5'10"	Córdoba
Taiwan	Jen-Ling Lu	23	170	5'7"	Taipei
United States	Tori Eileene Liesy	23	175	5'9"	Portland
Venezuela	Ivanna Mariam Vale Colman	20	176	5'9.5"	Mérida

== Crossovers ==
Contestants who previously competed or will compete at other beauty pageants:

- Reina Hispanoamericana 2009
  - Dominican Republic – Melody Mir (2nd runner up)
    - Spain's representative
- Miss Intercontinental 2010
  - Mexico – Alejandra Balderas
- Miss Atlántico Internacional 2011
  - Mexico – Alejandra Balderas
- Miss Universe 2011
  - Haiti – Anedie Azael
- Miss Supranational 2012
  - Bolivia – Adriana Rivera
- Miss International 2012
  - Dominican Republic – Melody Mir (3rd runner up)
  - Haiti – Anedie Azael (Top 15)
- Miss Intercontinental 2012
  - Portugal – Indira Ferreira
- Miss Earth 2012
  - Taiwan – Jen-Ling Lu
- Miss World 2013
  - Aruba – Larisa Leeuwe (Top 20)
- Miss Coffee International 2012
  - Colombia – Claudy Blandon (2nd runner up)
- Miss International 2015
  - Honduras – Jennifer Valle (1st runner up)
- Miss Earth 2016
  - Ecuador – Katherine Espin (Winner)
