= Ivanna Vale =

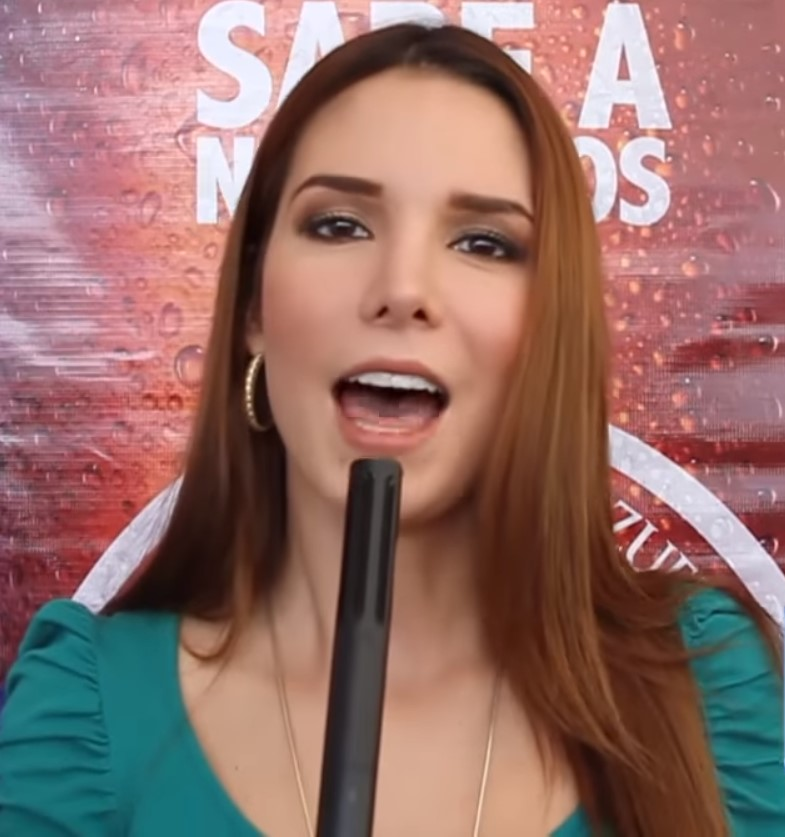
- Ivanna Vale in 2015
- Born: Ivanna Mariam Vale Colman; 29 March 1992 (age 34); Mérida, Mérida, Venezuela
- Height: 1.76 m (5 ft 9 1/2 in)
- Beauty pageant titleholder
- Title: Miss Táchira 2012; Reina Internacional del Café 2013
- Hair color: Brown
- Eye color: Brown
- Major competitions: Miss Táchira 2012; (Winner); Miss Venezuela 2012; (1st Runner-Up); Reinado Internacional del Café 2013; (Winner)

Ivanna Mariam Vale Colman is a Venezuelan model and beauty pageant titleholder. She represented Táchira state at Miss Venezuela 2012 and won the Miss Coffee International or the Reinado Internacional del Café 2013 in Manizales (Colombia) on 12 January 2013.

== See also ==
- Miss Venezuela 2012
- Reinado Internacional del Café 2013
