= Elián Herrera (model) =

Venezuelan model, beauty pageant titleholder and volleyball player

- Born: Nicelin Elián Herrera Vásquez; January 4, 1991 (age 35); Cagua, Aragua, Venezuela
- Height: 1.85 m (6 ft 1 in)
- Beauty pageant titleholder
- Title: Miss Aragua 2012; Miss Venezuela International 2012
- Hair color: Brown
- Eye color: Brown
- Major competitions: Miss Venezuela 2012 (Miss Venezuela International 2012); Miss International 2013 (Unplaced)

Nicelin Elián Herrera Vásquez (January 4, 1991) is a Venezuelan model, volleyball player and beauty pageant titleholder. She represented Aragua state at Miss Venezuela 2012.

== Pageantry ==
On August 30, 2012, during the Miss Venezuela 2012 pageant, Elián finished as first runner-up and was crowned Miss Venezuela International 2012. She represented Venezuela in Miss International 2013 but failed to place in the semifinals yet she got the third place at the Miss Internet on line poll.

Elián is an avid sportswoman, she was part of the Venezuela National Female Volleyball team. She represented Venezuela during the Juegos Suramericanos Juveniles in 2009. Before the pageant, she was playing for the Aragua volleyball team in the Venezuelan league. She helped her team win the national championships in 2010 and 2011.

== See also ==
- Miss Venezuela 2012
- Miss International 2013

Awards and achievements
Preceded by Blanca Aljibes	Miss Venezuela International; 2012	Succeeded by Michelle Bertolini
Preceded by Yosddy Hernandez	Miss Aragua; 2012	Succeeded by Stephanie de Zorzi
