= Guacara Municipality =

Guacara Municipality Municipio Guacara
- Municipality
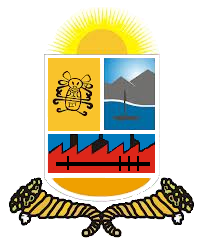
- Flag Coat of arms

- Location in Carabobo

- Location in Venezuela
- Coordinates: 10°15′35″N 67°53′12″W
- Country: Venezuela
- State: Carabobo
- Municipal seat: Guacara

Government
  - Mayor: Johan Castañeda Calderón (PSUV)

Area
  - Total: 206.4 km^{2} (79.7 sq mi)

Population (2011)
  - Total: 176,218
  - Density: 853.8/km^{2} (2,211/sq mi)
- Time zone: UTC−4 (VET)
- Area code(s): 0243
- Website: Official website

The Guacara Municipality is one of the fourteen municipalities (municipios) that make up the Venezuelan state of Carabobo. according to the 2011 census by the National Institute of Statistics of Venezuela, the municipality has a population of 176,218. The town of Guacara is the shire town of the Guacara Municipality.

== Demographics ==
The Guacara Municipality, according to a 2007 population estimate by the National Institute of Statistics of Venezuela, has a population of 171,123 (up from 145,132 in 2000). This amounts to 7.7% of the state's population. The municipality's population density is 1,037.11 inhabitants per square kilometre (2,686.1/sq mi).

== Government ==
The mayor of the Guacara Municipality is Jhoan Castañeda. He replaced Jose Manuel Flores Salazar shortly after the elections. The municipality is divided into three parishes; Ciudad Alianza, Guacara, and Yagua.

== See also ==
- Municipalities of Venezuela
