= Reinado Internacional del Café =

International beauty pageant based in Colombia

- Formation: 1957
- Type: Beauty pageant
- Headquarters: Manizales, Colombia
- President: Carmenza Jaramillo

Reinado Internacional del Café (in English: International Queen of Coffee) is a women's beauty pageant held annually since its first edition in 1957. From its beginning until 1971, the event was called Continental Coffee Queen, as it only included countries from the American continent. The purpose of the event is to celebrate, within the Feria de Manizales, the cultivation and production of coffee among the countries that send their beauty ambassadors. Manizales has become the industrial hub of Colombia’s coffee industry, located in the region now known as the Coffee Axis (Eje Cafetero). The current titleholder is the Venezuelan Lady Di Mosquera.

== Titleholders ==
Year	Reina (1st Place)	Virreina (2nd Place)	Primera Princesa (3rd Place)	Segunda Princesa (4th Place)	Tercera Princesa (5th Place)
1957	Panama - Análida Alfaro	Not awarded	Not awarded	Not awarded	Not awarded
1959	Brazil - Denise Guimarães	Honduras - Norma Rivas	Dominican Republic - Cristina Álvarez	Not awarded	Not awarded
1961	Brazil - Mercedes Von Glehn	Bolivia - Martha Fiorilo	Honduras - Frances Rheinboldt	Not awarded	Not awarded
1963	Honduras - Lourdes Soto	Peru - Bertha Zapata	Colombia - Blanca Arbeláez	Not awarded	Not awarded
1972	Paraguay - Stella Volpe	Ecuador - Ximena Ochoa	Venezuela - Jeannette Donzella	Not awarded	Not awarded
1973	Argentina - Alicia Batetta	Costa Rica - Rosario Carranza	Peru - Ana María Dibos	Not awarded	Not awarded
1974	Colombia - Luz María Osorio	Venezuela - Hilda Carrero	Costa Rica - Vera Soto	Not awarded	Not awarded
1975	Colombia - Paulina Rieder	Chile - Violeta Rentería	Paraguay - Susana Vire	Not awarded	Not awarded
1976	Puerto Rico - María González	Nicaragua - Guadalupe Mora	(Dominican Republic) Dominica - Miguelina Sánchez	Not awarded	Not awarded
1979	Chile - Paulina Palacios	Colombia - Ana María Ramírez	Guatemala - Claudia Iriarte	Not awarded	Not awarded
1981	(Dominican Republic) Dominica - Milagros Germán	Mexico - Patricia Romero	Guatemala - Ligia Noack	Not awarded	Not awarded
1982	Colombia - Eddy Puerta	Peru - Lucila Lacca	Guatemala - Ilma Urrutia	Not awarded	Not awarded
1983	Chile - Karen Encina	Mexico - Lorena León	Colombia - Mercedes Peña	Not awarded	Not awarded
1984	Honduras - Ollie Thompson	Peru - Rosana Zavala	Mexico - Eugenia Vásquez	Not awarded	Not awarded
1985	Brazil - Márcia Gabrielle	Peru - Patricia Espejo	Panama - Cilinia Acosta	Colombia - Clara Perthuz	Ecuador - Maria Zambrano
1987	Argentina - Mariela Prinčič	Guatemala - Claudia Godoy	Chile - Lydia Birke	Not awarded	Not awarded
1988	Brazil - Márcia Marques	Venezuela - Bonny Rey	Peru - Marilú Ibarra	(Dominican Republic) Dominica - Jacqueline Soñé	Colombia - Mónica Pacheco
1989	Costa Rica - Luana Bustamante	Peru - Nuria Raygata	(Dominican Republic) Dominica - Rosa Monegra	Uruguay - Gisel Sienra	Colombia - Carmiña Suárez
1990	Chile - Daniela Magnasco	Costa Rica - Julieta Fuentes	Colombia - Ángela Restrepo	Puerto Rico - Elba Borges	Paraguay - Emiliana Leitacón
1991	Costa Rica - Viviana Muñoz	Colombia - Olga Maya	Argentina - Vanessa Oyola	Guatemala - Isabel la Hoz	(United States) USA - Brenda Hamor
1992	Uruguay - Margaret Shaffner	Japan - Yumi Kuwano	Colombia - Carmen Ebrat	Guatemala - Silke Perdomo	(United States) USA - Shauna Lyn Grant
1993	Colombia - Sabina Zuluaga	(United States) USA - Juliandra Cox	Argentina - Claudia Mosquera	Brazil - Cristiane Xavier	Mexico - Patricia Hernández
1994	Puerto Rico - Brenda Robles	Portugal - Márcia Castro	Venezuela - Kalena Díaz	El Salvador - Beatriz Pinto	Brazil - Vanessa Gurgel
1995	Brazil - Regilaine Bittencourt	El Salvador - Carmen Valera	Venezuela - Yoseany Finol	Puerto Rico - Desirée Lowry	(Dominican Republic) Dominica - Vielka Lama
1996	(Dominican Republic) Dominica - Lara Betances	Brazil - Karla Koning	Colombia - Patsy Pérez	Not awarded	Not awarded
1997	Peru - Mónica Vettori	Venezuela - Marena Bencomo	Colombia - Gladys Caicedo	Costa Rica - Rebeca Trejos	Aruba - Alexandra Ochoa
1998	Venezuela - Jairam Navas	Spain - Ana Gutiérrez	Costa Rica - Luisa Salazar	Not awarded	Not awarded
1999	Venezuela - Dayra Lambis	(Dominican Republic) Dominica - Carloty García	Chile - Carolina Arredondo	Not awarded	Not awarded
2000	Costa Rica - Cristine Meserville	Panama - Marianela Guillén	Poland - Renata Piotrowska	Not awarded	Not awarded
2001	Brazil - Francine Eickemberg	Mexico - Eva Torres	Spain - Yolanda García	Poland - Magdalena Szarek	Argentina - Daniela Stucan
2002	Germany - Katharina Berndt	Bolivia - Claudia Antelo	Venezuela - Aura Zambrano	Colombia - Johanna Lemus	Puerto Rico - Gamalis Cotto
2003	Portugal - Raquel Loureiro	Brazil - Priscila Rosa	Panama - Carolina Miranda	(Dominican Republic) Dominica - Carol Arciniegas	Spain - Lidia Zaforas
2004	Germany - Daniela Scholz	Portugal - Silvia Dias	Venezuela - Silvana Santaella	Spain - Laura Alba	Panama - Melissa Meléndez
2005	Spain - Aránzazu Testa	(Dominican Republic) Dominica - Yadira Cury	Canada - Christiana Marzek	Brazil - Célia Renata	Colombia - Karina Bedoya
2006	Canada - Alice Panikian	Argentina - Evangelina García	Venezuela - Liliana Campa	Spain - Rocío Bobadilla	Colombia - Leonor Duque
2007	Costa Rica - Fabriella Quesada	Spain - Tania García	Honduras - Yasmina Hernández	Mexico - Monserrat Enciso	Colombia - Carolina Castaño
2008	Bolivia - Jéssica Jordan	Uruguay - Camila Carvalho	Venezuela - Mónica Bsereni	(Dominican Republic) Dominica - Mabel Peña	Panama - Aimeé Saldaña
2009	Colombia - Alejandra Mesa	Spain - Ana Martínez	Venezuela - Natasha Boscán	(Dominican Republic) Dominica - Victoria Tavárez	Brazil - Anelize García
2010	Brazil - Mariana Notarângelo	Poland - Iwona Wyrzykowska	Bolivia - Flavia Arzabe	(Dominican Republic) Dominica - Audris Rijo	Venezuela - Elizabeth Mosquera
2011	(Dominican Republic) Dominica - Sofinel Báez	Venezuela - Angela Ruiz	Colombia - Jenny Villada	Spain - Ana Socorro	Bolivia - Teresa Córdova
2012	Bolivia - Ximena Vargas	Colombia - Yoselín Castillo	Indonesia - Laskary Metal	Venezuela - Gabriella Ferrari	Brazil - Aline Sales
2013	Venezuela - Ivanna Vale	Colombia - Claudy Romaña	(Dominican Republic) Dominica - Melody Mir	Aruba - Larissa Leeuwe	Honduras - Jennifer Morel
2014	Brazil - Priscila Durand	Colombia - Estefania Muñoz	Spain - María Benítez	Paraguay - Noelia Rodríquez	Uruguay - Antonella González
2015	Japan - Yuri Uchida	Portugal - Márcia Assunção	Venezuela - Yulibeth Angarita	Brazil - Vitória Bisognin	Haiti - Yvanne Baptiste
2016	Venezuela - Maydeliana Díaz	Brazil - Júlia Horta	Colombia - Laura Prada	Spain - María José García	United States - Jeslie Mergal
2017	Mexico - Lourdes Acevedo	Honduras - Kerelyne Webster	Italy - Sara Croce	Brazil - Francielly Ouriques	Venezuela - Ana Cristina Díaz
2018	Spain - Carmen Serrano	Canada - Marta Stepien	Venezuela - Yanett Dib	Panama - Angelica Mancilla	Puerto Rico - Chelsey Agrón
2019	Colombia - Scarlet Sánchez	Bolivia - Yesenia Barrientos	Japan - Yu Harada	Venezuela - Sofía Trujillo	Brazil - Innessa Pontes
2020	El Salvador - Iris Guerra	Mexico - Laura Romero	Poland - Natalia Pigula	Venezuela - Alessandra Cardola	Honduras - Grisell Romero
2022	Venezuela - Ismelys Velásquez	Brazil - Eduarda Valotto	Colombia - Mariana Cifuentes	El Salvador - Luciana Cienfuegos	United States - Rebecca Stoughton
2023	Colombia - Isabella Bermudez	Costa Rica - Maricrís Rojas	Haiti - Cassandra Jacques	Panama - Ashley Díaz	Italy - Sofia Ferraris
2024	Poland - Aleksandra Klepaczka	France - Manuella Parent	Cuba - Karla Vilches	Spain - Lola Wilson	Mexico - Karla Rivas
2025	Brazil - Cristiane Stipp	Bolivia - Fabiane Zambrana	Poland - Martyna Ruranska	Colombia - Camila Arcila	Costa Rica - Atalyane Torres
2026	Venezuela - Lady Di Mosquera	Brazil - Lorena Ohana	El Salvador - Valeria Amaya	Mexico - Ruslana Zicaru	Argentina - Melany González

- Not held in 1958, 1960, 1962, 1964–71, 1977–78, 1980, 1986 and 2021

=== Winner's Gallery ===
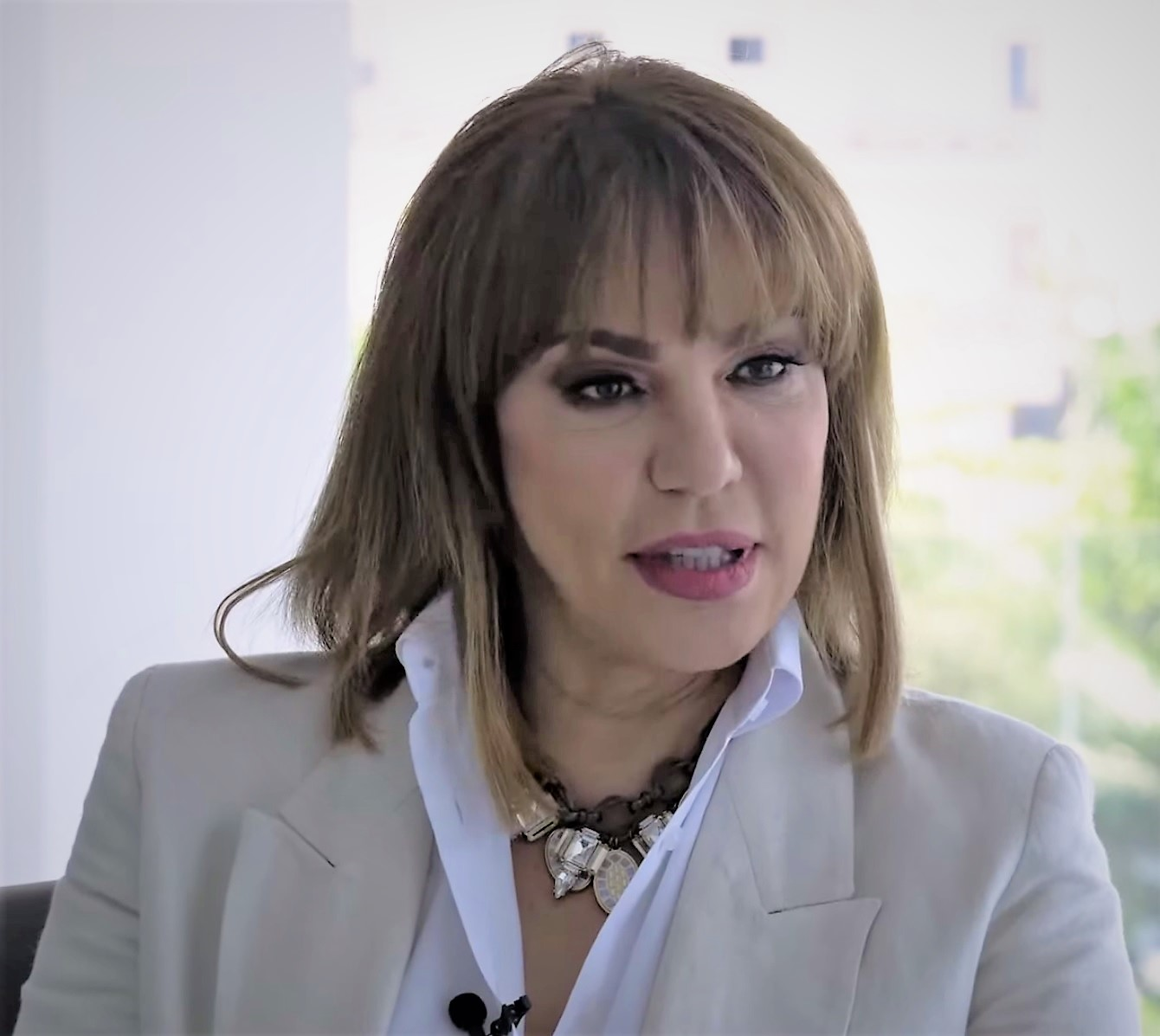
Reina Internacional del Café 1981,
Milagros Germán,
Dominican Republic

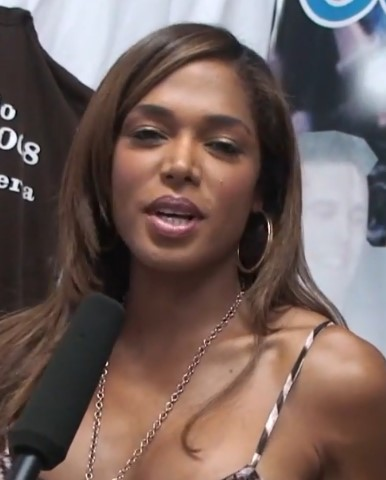
Reina Internacional del Café 1999,
Dayra Lambis,
Venezuela

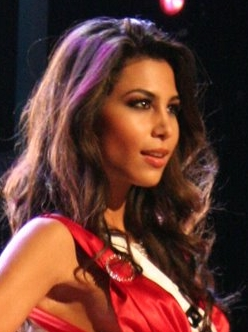
Reina Internacional del Café 2008,
Jessica Jordan,
Bolivia

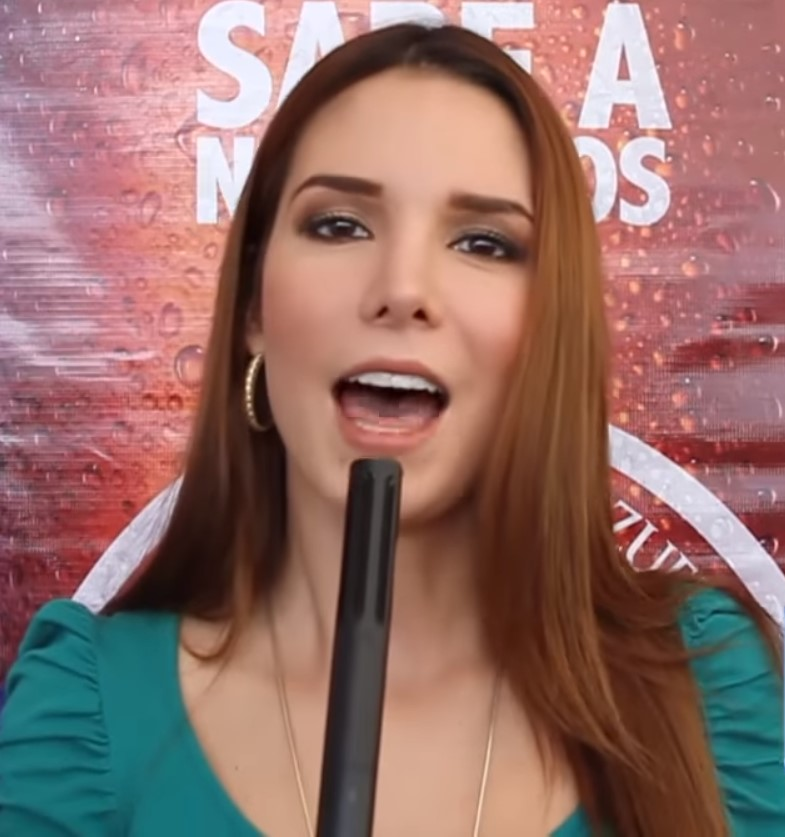
Reina Internacional del Café 2013,
Ivanna Vale,
Venezuela

== Titles By Countries ==
=== 1st Place ===
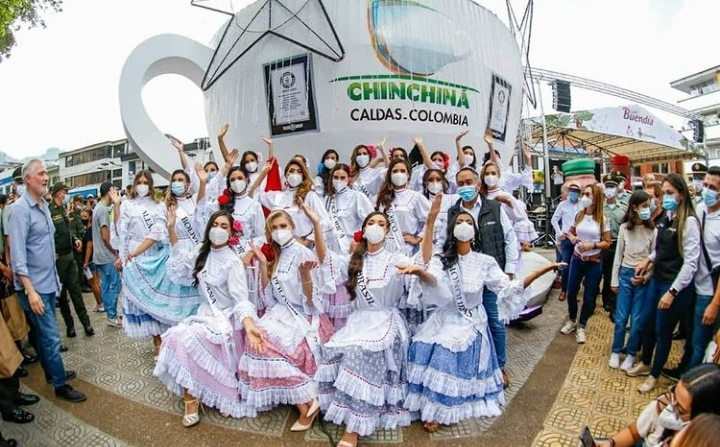
Contestants of Reinado Internacional del Café 2022 visiting the city of Chinchiná.

Country	Titles	Year(s)
Brazil	9	1959, 1961, 1985, 1988, 1995, 2001, 2010, 2014, 2025
Colombia	7	1974, 1975, 1982, 1993, 2009, 2019, 2023
Venezuela	6	1998, 1999, 2013, 2016, 2022, 2026
Costa Rica	4	1989, 1991, 2000, 2007
Dominican Republic	3	1981, 1996, 2011
Chile	3	1979, 1983, 1990
Spain	2	2005, 2018
Bolivia	2	2008, 2012
Germany	2	2002, 2004
Puerto Rico	2	1976, 1994
Argentina	2	1973, 1987
Honduras	2	1963, 1984
Poland	1	2024
El Salvador	1	2020
Mexico	1	2017
Japan	1	2015
Canada	1	2006
Portugal	1	2003
Peru	1	1997
Uruguay	1	1992
Paraguay	1	1972
Panama	1	1957

=== 2nd Place ===
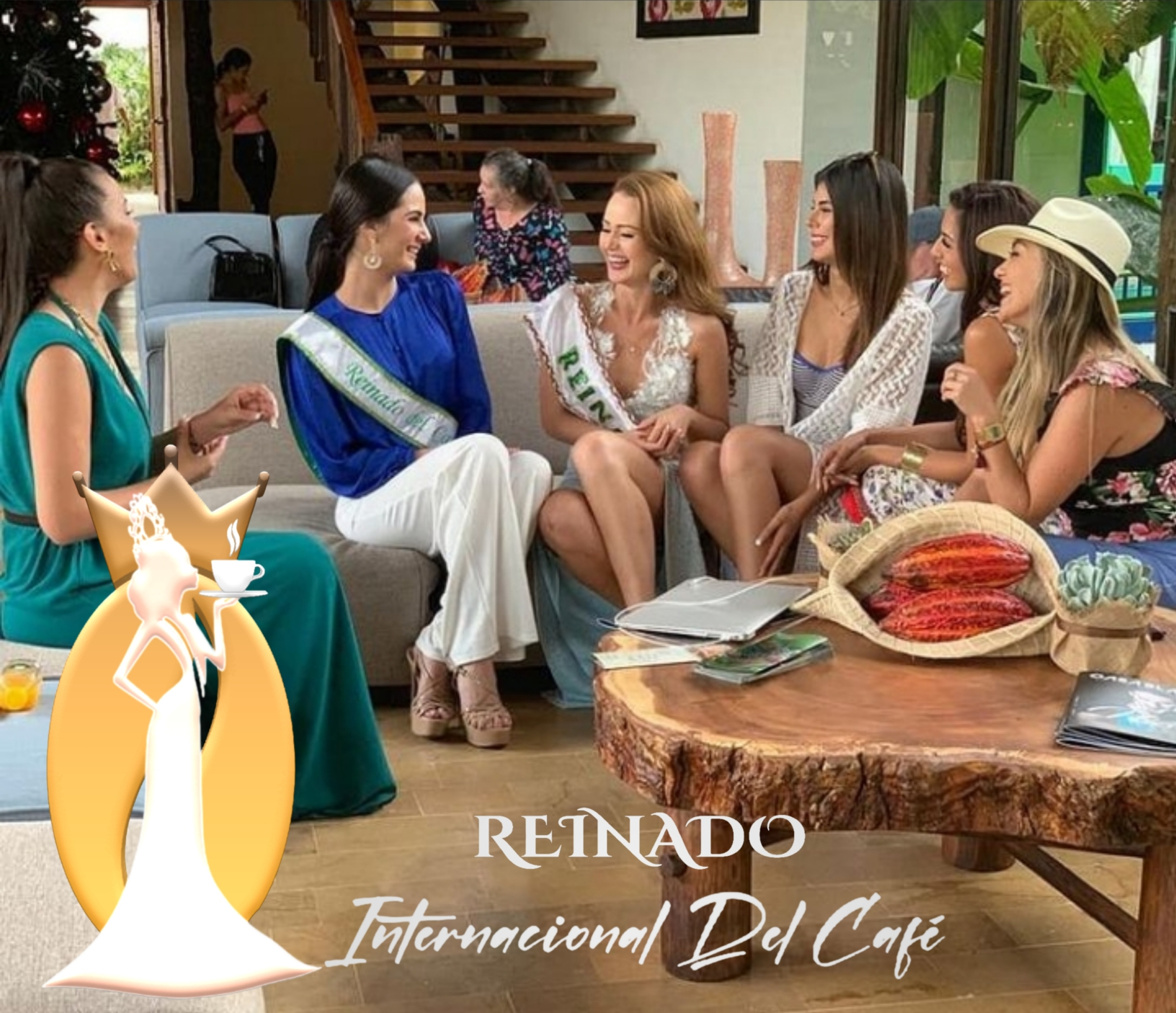
Some of the contestants of Reinado Internacional del Café 2019 interacting to each other.

Country	Titles	Year(s)
Brazil	5	1996, 2003, 2016, 2022, 2026
Colombia	5	1979, 1991, 2012, 2013, 2014
Peru	5	1963, 1982, 1984, 1985, 1989
Bolivia	4	1961, 2002, 2019, 2025
Mexico	4	1981, 1983, 2001, 2020
Venezuela	4	1974, 1988, 1997, 2011
Costa Rica	3	1973, 1990, 2023
Portugal	3	1994, 2004, 2015
Spain	3	1998, 2007, 2009
Honduras	2	1959, 2017
Dominican Republic	2	1999, 2005
France	1	2024
Canada	1	2018
Poland	1	2010
Uruguay	1	2008
Argentina	1	2006
Panama	1	2000
El Salvador	1	1995
United States	1	1993
Japan	1	1992
Guatemala	1	1987
Nicaragua	1	1976
Chile	1	1975
Ecuador	1	1972

=== 3rd Place ===
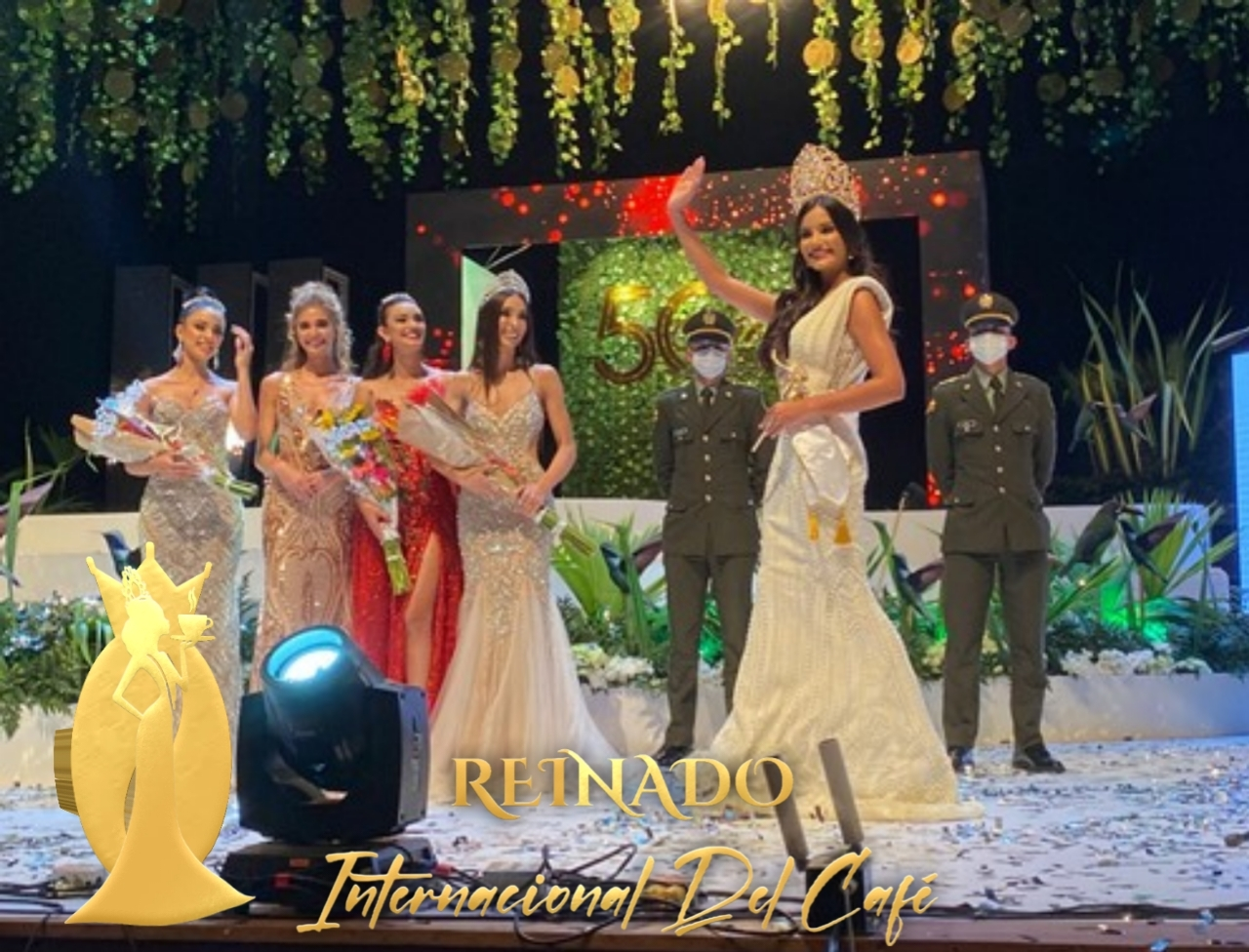
The crowning moment of Ismelys Velásquez of Venezuela as Reina Internacional del Café 2022.

Country	Titles	Year(s)
Colombia	9	1963, 1983, 1990, 1992, 1996, 1997, 2011, 2016, 2022
Venezuela	7	1972, 1994, 2006, 2008, 2009, 2015, 2018
Dominican Republic	4	1959, 1976, 1989, 2013
Poland	3	2000, 2020, 2025
Guatemala	3	1979, 1981, 1982
Spain	2	2001, 2014
Honduras	2	1961, 2007
Panama	2	1985, 2003
Chile	2	1987, 1999
Costa Rica	2	1974, 1998
Argentina	2	1991, 1993
Peru	2	1973, 1988
El Salvador	1	2026
Cuba	1	2024
Haiti	1	2023
Japan	1	2019
Italy	1	2017
Indonesia	1	2012
Bolivia	1	2010
Canada	1	2005
Mexico	1	1984
Paraguay	1	1975

=== 4th Place ===
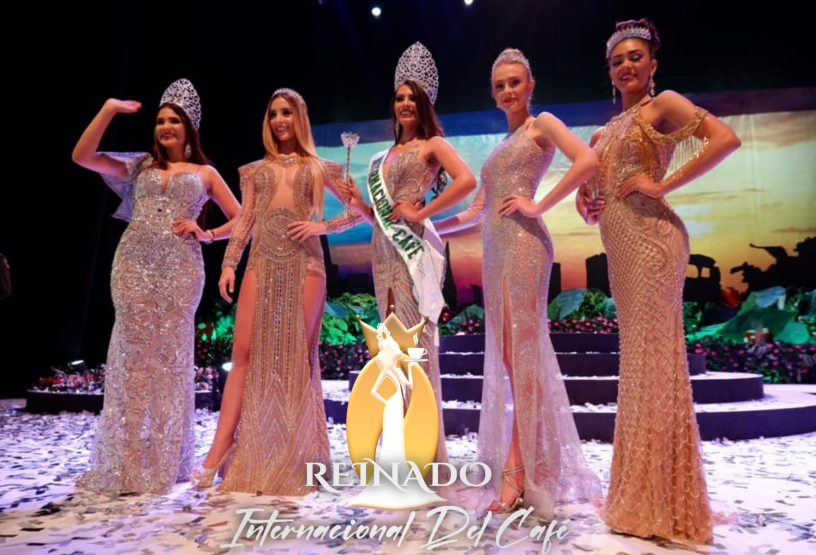
The crowning moment of Iris Guerra of El Salvador as Reina Internacional del Café 2020.

Country	Titles	Year(s)
Spain	5	2004, 2006, 2011, 2016, 2024
Dominican Republic	5	1988, 2003, 2008, 2009, 2010
Brazil	4	1993, 2005, 2015, 2017
Colombia	3	1985, 2002, 2025
Venezuela	3	2012, 2019, 2020
Mexico	2	2007, 2026
Panama	2	2018, 2023
El Salvador	2	1994, 2022
Colombia	2	1985, 2002
Puerto Rico	2	1990, 1995
Guatemala	2	1991, 1992
Paraguay	1	2014
Aruba	1	2013
Poland	1	2001
Costa Rica	1	1997
Uruguay	1	1989

=== 5th Place ===
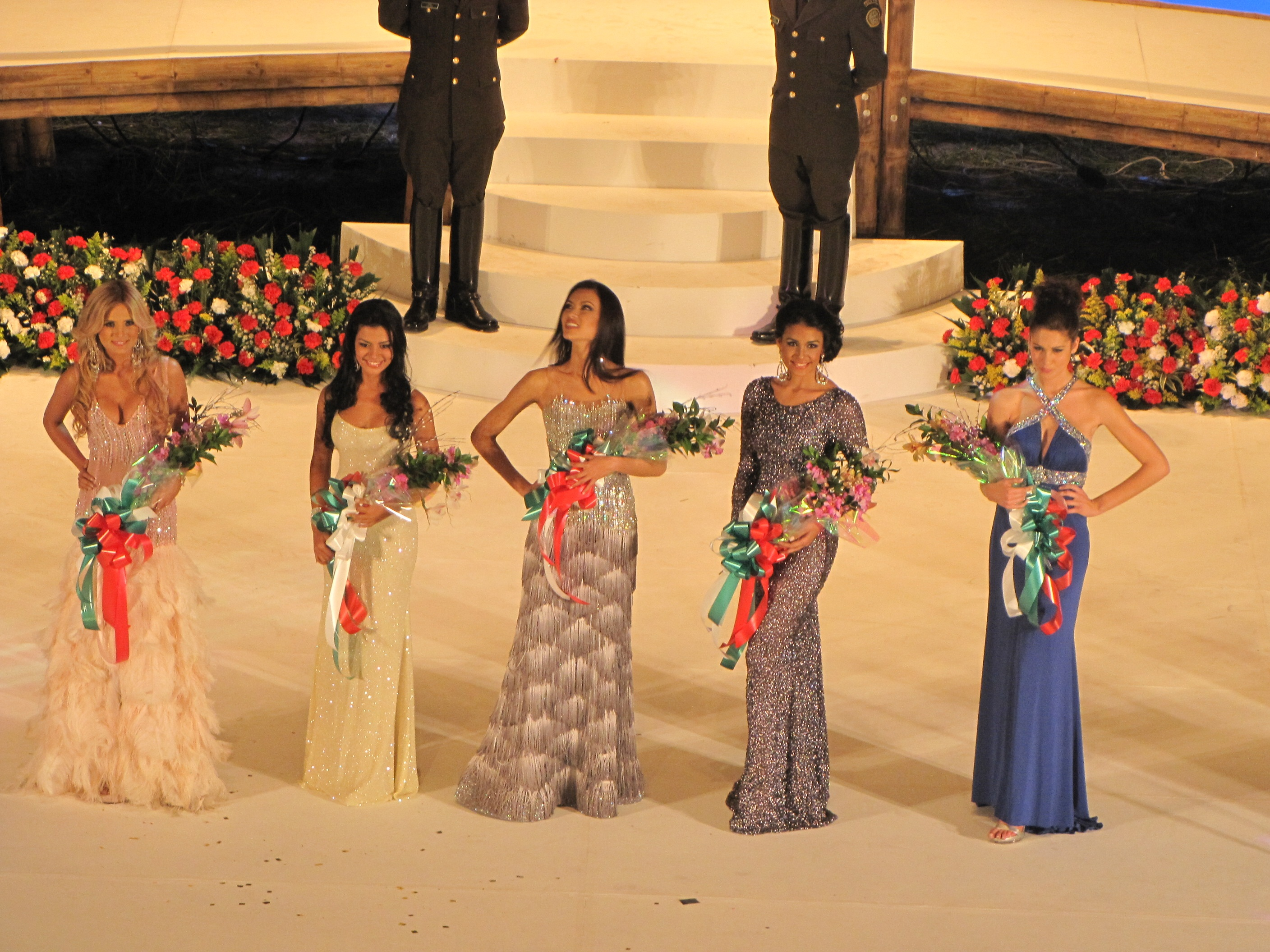
The five finalists of Reinado Internacional del Café 2011.

Country	Titles	Year(s)
Colombia	6	1988, 1989, 2005, 2006, 2007
United States	4	1991, 1992, 2016, 2022
Brazil	4	1994, 2009, 2012, 2019
Argentina	2	2001, 2026
Mexico	2	1993, 2024
Honduras	2	2013, 2020
Puerto Rico	2	2002, 2018
Venezuela	2	2010, 2017
Panama	2	2004, 2008
Costa Rica	1	2025
Italy	1	2023
Haiti	1	2015
Uruguay	1	2014
Bolivia	1	2011
Spain	1	2003
Aruba	1	1997
Dominican Republic	1	1995
Paraguay	1	1990
Ecuador	1	1985

=== 6th Place ===
Country	Titles	Year(s)
Guatemala	1	2019

== Representatives from English speaking countries ==
=== United States at Reina Internacional del Café ===
Color key

- Declared as Winner
- Ended as runner-up
- Ended as one of the finalists or semifinalists

Host/Year	Participation	Contestant	State	Placement	Special Awards
1979	1	Nancy Helen Ness	Virginia		
1987	2	Brenda Lynn Ortiz	Hawaii		
1989	3	Amy Marte Carrierre	California		
1991	4	Brenda Hamor	California	4th runner-up	
1992	5	Shauna Searles Grant	California	4th runner-up	
1993	6	Juliandra Cox Heyd	Texas	1st runner-up	
1994	7	Amy Christine Rising	Florida		
1995	8	Jennifer Kimble	Arkansas		
1996	9	Kimberly Anne Byers	California	Top 06	
1997	10	Barbara Lynn Humes	California		
1998	11	Raquel Lynette Troyer	California		
1999	12	Diana Scianca Flores	California		
2000	13	Ashley Kristina Lincoln	California		Miss Congeniality
2001	14	Janice Nichole Torring	California		
2002	15	Diana De Vries	California		
2003	16	Elizabeth Dillingham	California		
2004	17	Amy Lynne Holbrook	California		
2005	-	Amanda Cothran	California	Withdrew	
2006	-	Shannon Head	California	Withdrew	
2008	18	Katherine Cartagena	New York		
2009	19	Michelle Fleming	California	Top 10	
2010	20	Amanda Delgado	California		Best Hair
2011	21	Jocell Villa	California		Queen of Police
2012	22	Lili Dorotea Fifield	California		
2013	23	Tori Eileene Liesly	Oregon		
2014	24	Gabriela Warner	New York		
2016	25	Jeslie Mergal	Florida	4th runner-up	
2017	26	Claribel Marie	Georgia		
2018	-	Yahiranelly López	Florida	Withdrew	
2022	27	Rebecca Linn Stoughton	Illinois	4th runner-up	
2025	28	Brianna Morales	Colorado		

=== Canada at Reina Internacional del Café ===
Color key

- Declared as Winner
- Ended as runner-up
- Ended as one of the finalists or semifinalists

Host/Year	Participation	Contestant	Province	Placement	Special Awards
2004	1	Gretal Montgomery	British Columbia	Top 10	
2005	2	Christiana Marzek	Ontario	2nd runner-up	
2006	3	Alice Panikian	Ontario	Winner	
2007	4	Samantha Tajik	Ontario		
2008	5	Elena Semikina	Ontario		
2009	6	Chanel Beckenlehner	Ontario	Top 10	
2010	7	Mariana Valente	Ontario		
2011	8	Jamie Caitlin Molz	British Columbia		
2012	9	Emily Kiss	Ontario		
2013	10	Chelsea Bird	Alberta		
2014	11	Rasela Mino	Alberta		
2015	12	Kesiah Papasin	Ontario		
2016	13	Paola Núñez	Ontario		
2017	14	Camila González	Ontario		
2018	15	Marta Stępień	Ontario	1st runner-up	
2019	16	Rita Houkayem	Ontario		
2020	17	Alysha Melinda Ortiz	Alberta		
2022	18	Dominique Doucette	Quebec		
2023	19	Simran Sohal	Ontario		
2024	20	Đỗ Hoàng Kim	Alberta		
2025	21	Arshdeep Thind	British Columbia	Top 12	
2026	22	Jabili Kandula	Ontario		

=== England at Reina Internacional del Café ===
Color key

- Declared as Winner
- Ended as runner-up
- Ended as one of the finalists or semifinalists

Host/Year	Participation	Contestant	County	Placement	Special Awards
2011	1	Jessica Rose Edwards Monroy	Greater London		

=== The Bahamas at Reina Internacional del Café ===
Color key

- Declared as Winner
- Ended as runner-up
- Ended as one of the finalists or semifinalists

Host/Year	Participation	Contestant	City/Island	Placement	Special Awards
2009	1	Kerel Pinder	Freeport, Grand Bahama		
2010	2	Nikie Severe	Freeport, Grand Bahama		
2011	3	Tempest Stubbs	Freeport, Grand Bahama		
2012	4	Keriann Brittney Stuart	Nassau, New Providence		
2013	5	Kristie Antonia Farah	Nassau, New Providence		
2014	6	Lashanda Wildgoose	Nassau, New Providence		
2015	7	Sade Nataly Colebrook	Nassau, New Providence		
2016	8	Danielle Alexandrea Pratt	Freeport, Grand Bahama		
2017	9	Tiasha Winnifred Lewis	Freeport, Grand Bahama		
