= Lake Valencia (Venezuela) =

Lake in Venezuela

- Lake Tacarigua
- Lago de Valencia (Spanish); Lago Tacarigua (Spanish)
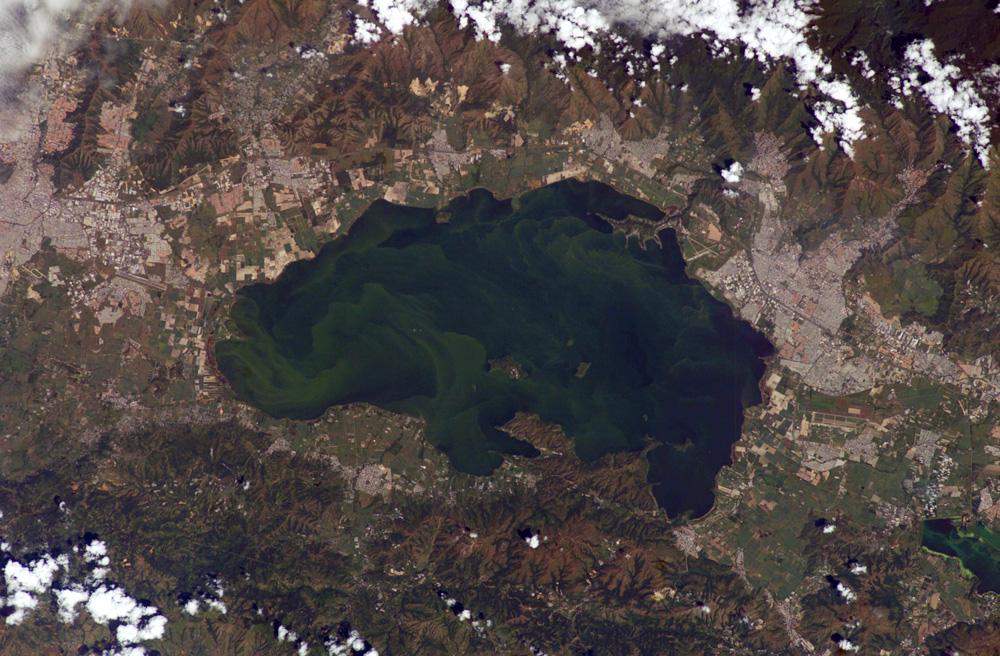

- Location within Venezuela
- Coordinates: 10°11′N 67°44′W
- Type: endorheic
- Primary inflows: Aragua River (main tributary)
- Catchment area: 2,646 km^{2} (1,022 sq mi)
- Basin countries: Venezuela
- Surface area: 350 km^{2} (140 sq mi)
- Average depth: 18 m (59 ft)
- Max. depth: 39 m (128 ft)
- Surface elevation: 410 m (1,350 ft)

Lake Valencia (Spanish: Lago de Valencia), formerly Lake Tacarigua, is a lake within Carabobo State and Aragua State in northern Venezuela.

== Geography ==
Lake Valencia is the third largest lake in Venezuela, after Lake Maracaibo and Lake Guri reservoir.

The lake is located in one of the Aragua valleys, between the parallel sub-Serranía del Interior in the Cordillera de la Costa Central, of the Venezuelan Coastal Ranges system.

The endorheic lake has natural discharge level at 427 m above sea level; the water level declined below this height about 250 years ago. Its surface level currently is 410 m above sea level, and is about 30 km long, has an area of 350 km^{2}. The maximum depth is 39 m, the mean depth 18 m. The lake has a number of small islands, with some inhabited.

Its drainage basin (watershed area) of 2,646 km^{2}. The most important river emptying into the lake is the Aragua River. Others include the El Limón River, Guacara River, Güigüe River, Mariara River and Turmero River, which flow through or near their respective cities, El Limón, Guacara, Güigüe, Mariara and Turmero.

== History ==
The lake was formed approximately 2–3 million years ago due to faulting and subsequent damming of the Cabriales River. The lake has been completely dry during several discrete periods of its geologic history.

Alexander von Humboldt visited the lake in 1800. He documented the negative impact of the surrounding population's land cultivation on the ecosystem. Deforestation and water diversion for irrigation led to the desiccation of Lake Valencia by dramatically reducing water levels. Lake Valencia is where Humboldt developed his conception of anthropogenic climate change. He later wrote:

When forests are destroyed, as they are everywhere in America by the European planters, with an imprudent precipitation, the springs are entirely dried up, or become less abundant, The beds of the rivers remaining dry during a part of the year, are converted into torrents, whenever great rains fall on the heights. The sward and moss disappearing from the brush-wood on the sides of the mountains, the waters falling in rain are no longer impeded in their course: and instead of slowly augmenting the level of the rivers by progressive filtrations, they furrow during heavy showers the sides of the hills, bear down the loose soil, and form those sudden inundations that devastate the country.

Since 1976, the water levels in Lake Valencia have risen due to diversion of water from neighboring drainage basins—it currently acts as a reservoir for the surrounding urban centers (such as Maracay and Valencia).

== Ecology ==
The lake suffers from algal blooms caused by continual influx of untreated wastewater from the surrounding urban, agricultural, and industrial land uses. This contributes to ongoing eutrophication, contamination, and salinization of the lake.

Despite its picturesque location between the Cordillera de la Costa to the north and the Serrania del Interior to the south, Lake Valencia's poor water quality limits opportunities for tourism and recreational activities. Due to pollution and other human induced changes, almost 60% of the native fish species in the lake were lost between 1960 and 1990. Among the fish in the lake is the diamond tetra, which is commonly kept in aquaria, while two species of catfish, Lithogenes valencia and Pimelodella tapatapae, are entirely endemic to the lake basin.

A lake clean-up scheme with finance from IDB has been described along with information on pollution loads, reuse opportunities and wastewater collection and treatment infrastructure, which was installed between 1991 and 2002.

== Sources ==
- "Lake Valenica, Venezuela". NASA Earth Observatory. Archived from the original on 13 January 2005.
