= Guacara =

- Guacara
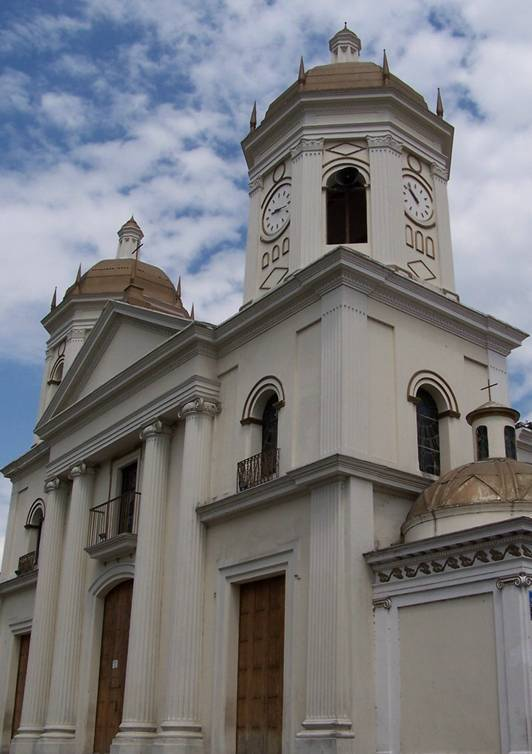

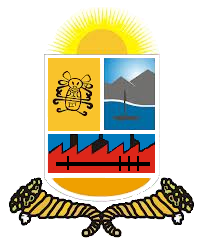
- Coat of arms

- Location within Venezuela
- Coordinates: 10°15′13″N 67°54′00″W
- Country: Venezuela
- State: Carabobo
- Municipality: Guacara Municipality
- Founded: 1624

Area
  - Total: 320 km^{2} (120 sq mi)
- Elevation: 438 m (1,437 ft)

Population (1 July 2009)
  - Total: 178,000
  - Density: 560/km^{2} (1,400/sq mi)
- Time zone: UTC−4 (VET)
- Climate: Aw

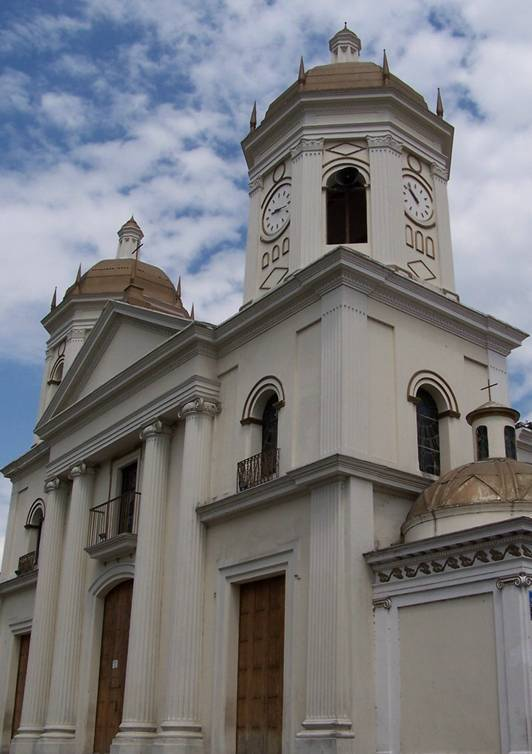
Church of Guacara

Guacara is a city in Carabobo State, Venezuela, seat of Guacara Municipality.

It was officially founded 1624, although it was already a settlement of indigenous people. It has an estimated population for July 2009 of 178,000 inhabitants. It is located northeast of Lake Valencia and has a river, the Vigirima River, which empties into the lake. It is connected to the Caracas-Valencia motorway and is 12 km from the city of Valencia.

== See also ==
- List of cities and towns in Venezuela
