= Carabobo =

- State of Venezuela
- Flag Coat of arms
- Motto: Ocassus servitutis English: Decline of servitude
- Anthem: Himno del Estado Carabobo
- Location within Venezuela
- Coordinates: 10.193°N 67.980°W
- Country: Venezuela
- Created: 1824
- Capital: Valencia

Government
  - Body: Legislative Council
  - Governor: Rafael Lacava (PSUV)

Area
  - Total: 4,369 km^{2} (1,687 sq mi)
  - Rank: 21st
- 0,51% of Venezuela

Population (2011)
  - Total: 2,245,744
  - Rank: 3rd
  - Density: 514.0/km^{2} (1,331/sq mi)
- Demonym: Carabobeño(a)
- Time zone: UTC−4 (VET)
- ISO 3166 code: VE-G
- Emblematic tree: Camoruco (Sterculia apelata)
- HDI (2019): 0.733 high · 4th of 24
- Website: www.carabobo.gob.ve

Carabobo State (Spanish: Estado Carabobo, IPA: [esˈtaðo kaɾaˈβoβo]) is one of the 23 states of Venezuela. Located in the Central Region of Venezuela, it is about two hours by car from Caracas. The state capital city is Valencia, which is also the country's main industrial center. The state's area is 4,369 km^{2} (1,687 sq mi) and, as of the 2011 census, had a population of 2,245,744.

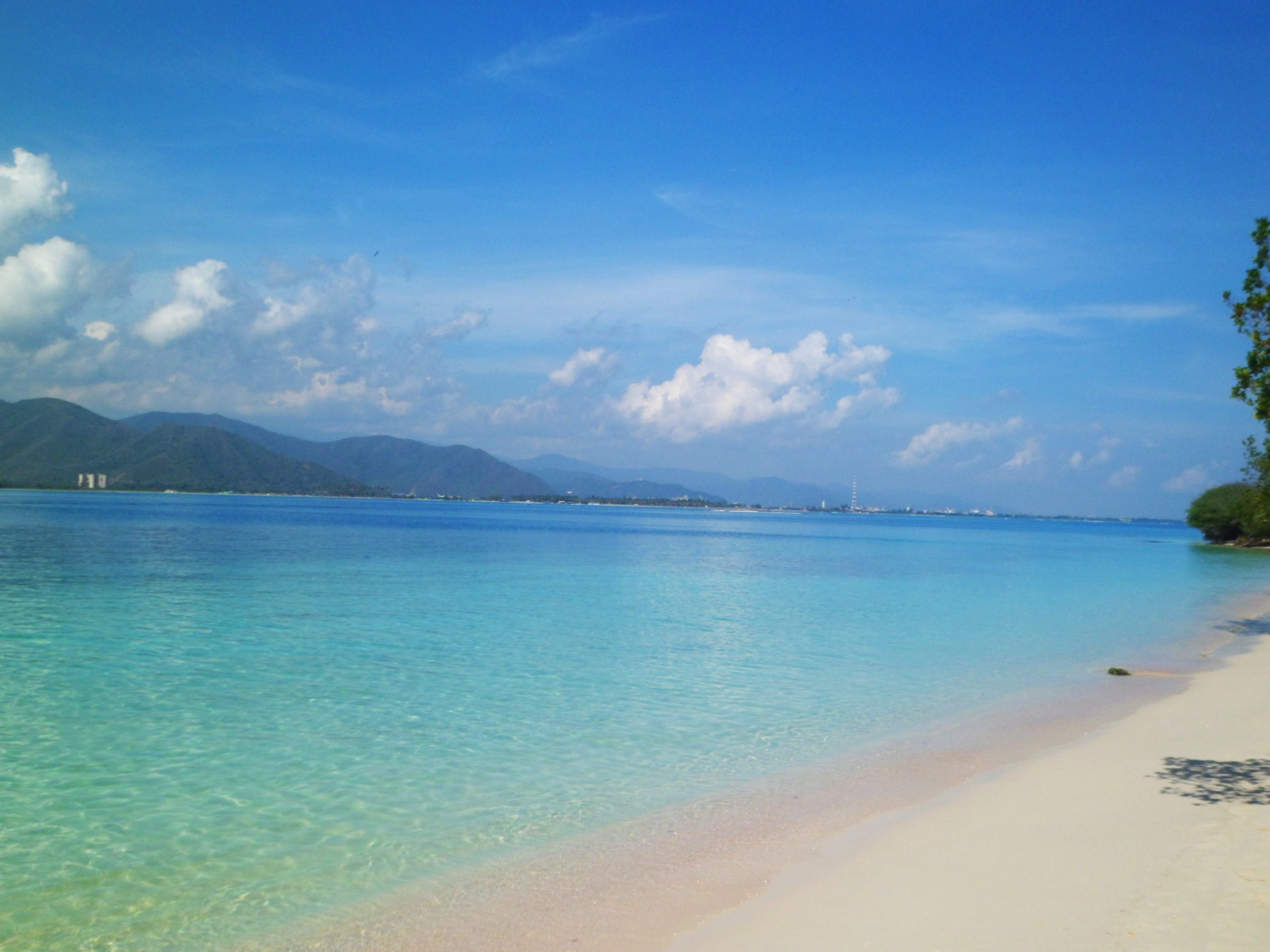
Beach in Carabobo State

Carabobo State was the site of the Battle of Carabobo on 24 June 1821. This was a decisive victory for the Venezuelans, led by Simón Bolívar, in their war of independence against Spain.

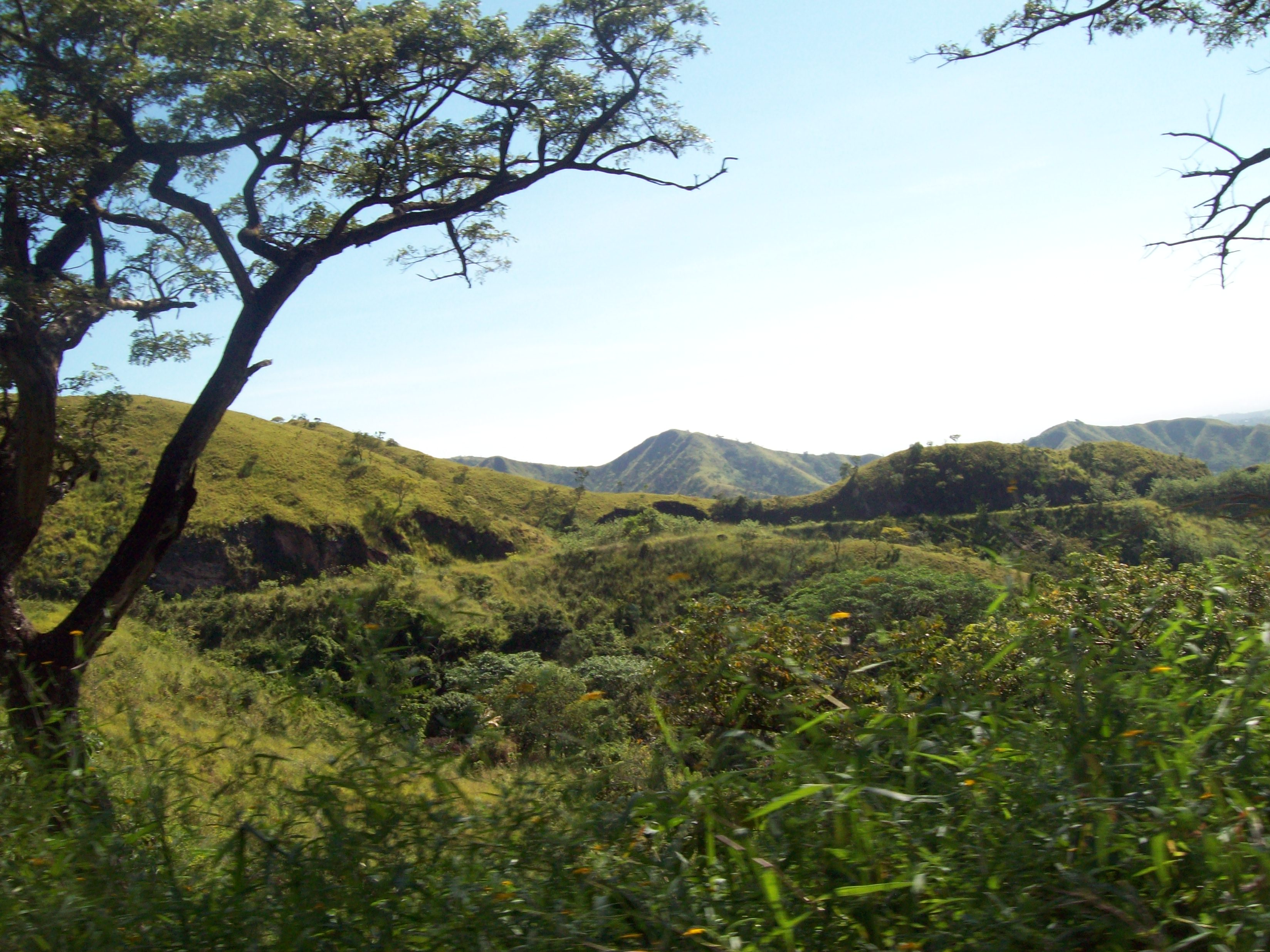
Bejuma Municipality, Carabobo

== Toponymy ==
There are several versions about the origin of the name Carabobo. One of them refers to a voice coming from a local Arawaco language: Karau means savannah and bo means water. The repeated bo acts as a superlative, i.e. a lot of water or streams. Thus, Carabobo would mean Savannah of Waters or Savannah of Ravines.

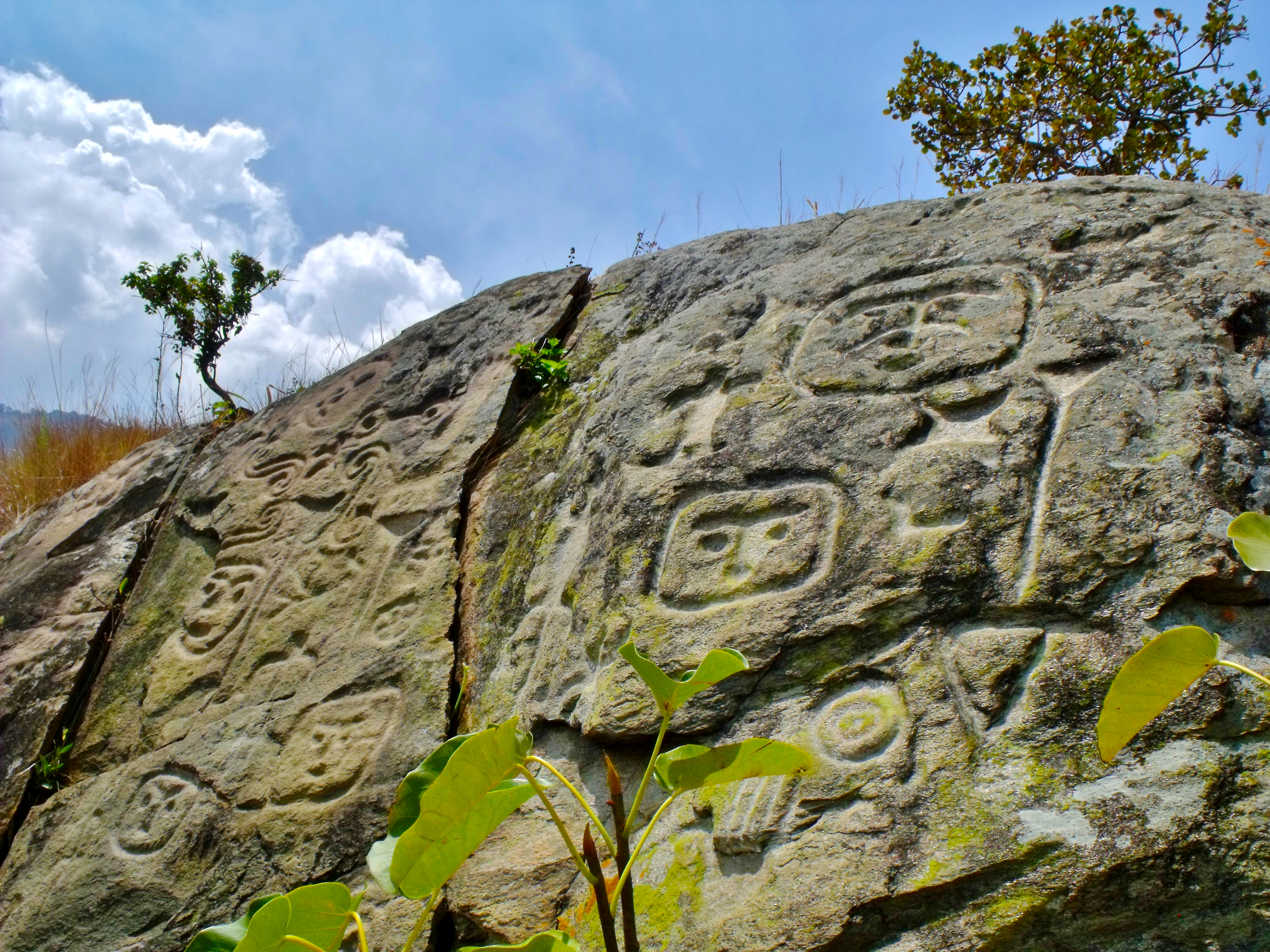
Indigenous petroglyphs in Vigirima

== History ==
=== Prehistory ===
==== First cultures ====
When Europeans arrived to what would become Venezuela, one of the most important cultural centres was located around the Valencia Lake. The Native Americans in the region were hunters, gatherers, but also fishers and farmers. Many petroglyphs and ceramics remain from this time.

There are signs of human presence in the Valencia region from the fourth millennium BC onwards. Humans were also present earlier in other areas of what is now Carabobo, like in Bejuma.

An important human settlement occurred around the Valencia Lake between 200 and 1000 AD. These people already practiced some kind of agriculture.

==== Second wave ====
At the end of the first millennium new populations started to arrive from the Orinoco region, probably via the El Pao River. From the eighth century onwards the Orinoco populations started to merge with the older groups. This fusion produced what is known as Valenciode culture. People lived in houses built on artificial mounds in the very fruitful valleys to the East and West of the Valencia Lake. They produced specially anthropomorphic sculptures.

Around the year 1200 the Valencioide culture reached the whole area of the Valencia Lake basin, the centre of Northern Venezuela and several islands in the Caribbean. The Indians would trade sea products like the (Strombus gigas), salt (specially from the Paraguana Peninsula), turtles and fish from coral reefs. The trade took place in villages along the coast.

Taramainas, Tacariguas and other tribes inhabited the Valencia Lake region when the Europeans arrived. The different groups spoke mostly Arawak languages, but there were also several Carib groups.

The Indians grew maize, a typical product of Western South American cultures and also Manioc, a typical product of groups from the East. Many metates or grinding stones for maize as well as budares for the preparation of cassava remain from those times.

The Jirajara Indians from Nirgua (now a region between Yaracuy and Carabobo), would go to the Valencia Lake and from there through the mountains to the Sea at the level of Borburata to get salt.

=== European conquest and colonization ===
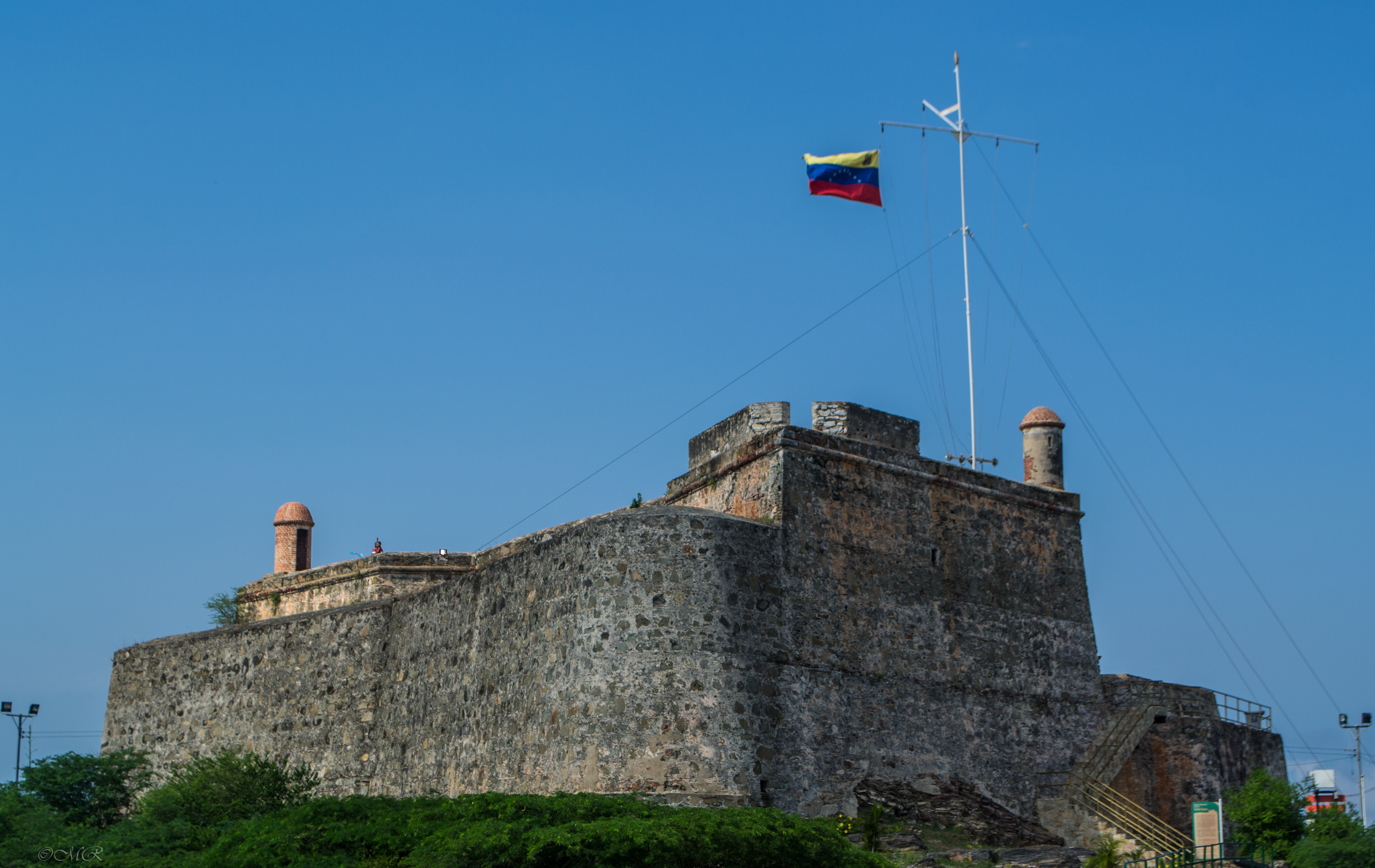
Fortín Solano a Spanish military fortress built in 1766

==== 15th and 16th centuries ====
Juan de Villegas founded the town of Borburata in 1548. Seven years later, in 1555, he founded Valencia in the central plains to the west of the Tacarigua (Valencia) Lake.

In 1577 and 1583 the region of Valencia suffered a series of raids by Carib tribes coming from the Low Orinoco. The Spanish troops led by Garci-González repelled and went after them.

During the late 16th and 17th centuries, the region suffered many attacks by French and British pirates. The town of Borburata was eventually abandoned for a long period, and settlers moved to Valencia, which was less likely to be raided as it was a day walk from the Caribbean. Some of the attacks included:

- 1555: French pirates attacked Borburata for 6 days
- 1564: British pirates led by John Hawkins 'forced' the Borburata settlers to buy his cargo, about two hundred Africans from the Gambia region and some European products.
- 1566: Lowell attacked Borburata
- 1567: French pirates led by Nicolas Vallier invaded Borburata and the inhabitants had to abandon the town
- 1568: John Hawkins attacked Borburata again and sold his new cargo of slaves. The main part of that cargo was a group of 400 Africans he had captured and enslaved in Western Africa.

==== 17th century ====
In 1624, Indians to the Northwest of the Valencia Lake established the settlement of Guacara.

Attacks by English and French pirates continued during a great part of the century. In 1659, the English pirate Myngs plundered Puerto Cabello on a raid that had taken him to Cumaná and later Coro. In 1677, Valencia was plundered by French pirates, who burnt down the Ayuntamiento or "City Hall" and destroyed most historical documents.

At the beginning of 1694, the governor of Venezuela, Francisco Berroterán, declared the growing Guacara, Los Guayos and San Diego doctrinas, "towns of Indians".

==== 18th century ====
The Compañía Guipuzcoana de Caracas, a company organized by Basque entrepreneurs, received the monopoly of trade between Venezuela and the rest of the world. In that context, the company built in 1730 the haven of what would become Puerto Cabello.

In 1800, German scientist Alexander von Humboldt explored the area in his South American trip.

=== Independence war ===
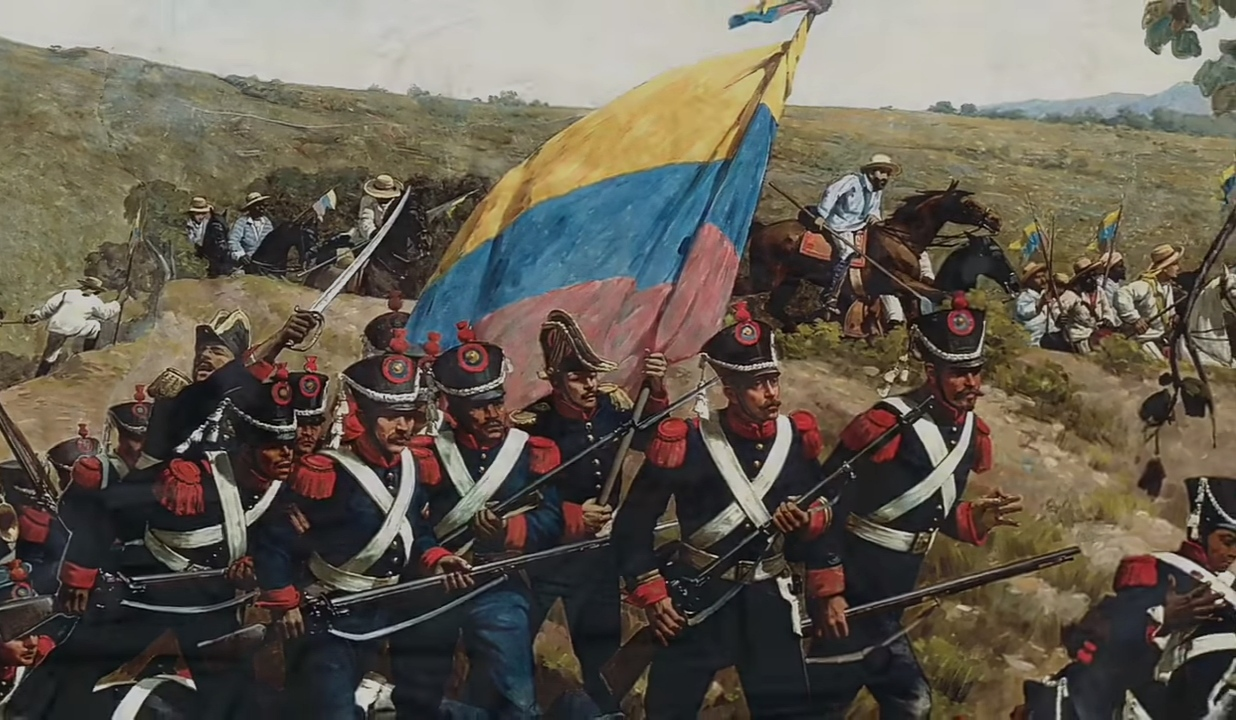
Carabobo Battle painted by Tovar y Tovar

Venezuela's independence was declared on 19 April 1810 in the Casa de la Estrella, in Valencia. The Independence act was signed there the next year, 5 July.

Several very important battles between Spanish royalist forces and the pro-Independence troops under Bolivar took place in the Carabobo region. The most important was the Battle of Carabobo, fought on 24 June 1821 and considered a key battle in the struggle for Venezuelan independence. After the battle, what was left of the Spanish forces holed up in the San Felipe Castle in Puerto Cabello until 10 November 1823, when they surrendered and left Venezuela.

=== Post-colonial times and civil war period ===
On 6 May 1830 the Congress of Valencia takes place. There, Venezuela declared the independence from the Great Colombia and Valencia was declared Venezuela's capital.

On 29 March 1832 the central government created the province of Barquisimeto from a part of Carabobo.

In 1858, during the March Revolution, Valencia became again capital of Venezuela.

Carabobo in 1879-1909

On 27 April 1881 the central government reforms the administrative divisions and creates the state of Carabobo, which at that time had a part that later was given to Yaracuy.

=== 20th century ===
During World War II, the crews of several Italian ships and one German ship took refuge on the Puerto Cabello bay. On 31 March 1941, they set fire to their ships to prevent US troops from capturing them. A big fire in the haven of Puerto Cabello ensued. Several hundred marines were captured. Many of the Italians eventually would decide to settle down in Venezuela.

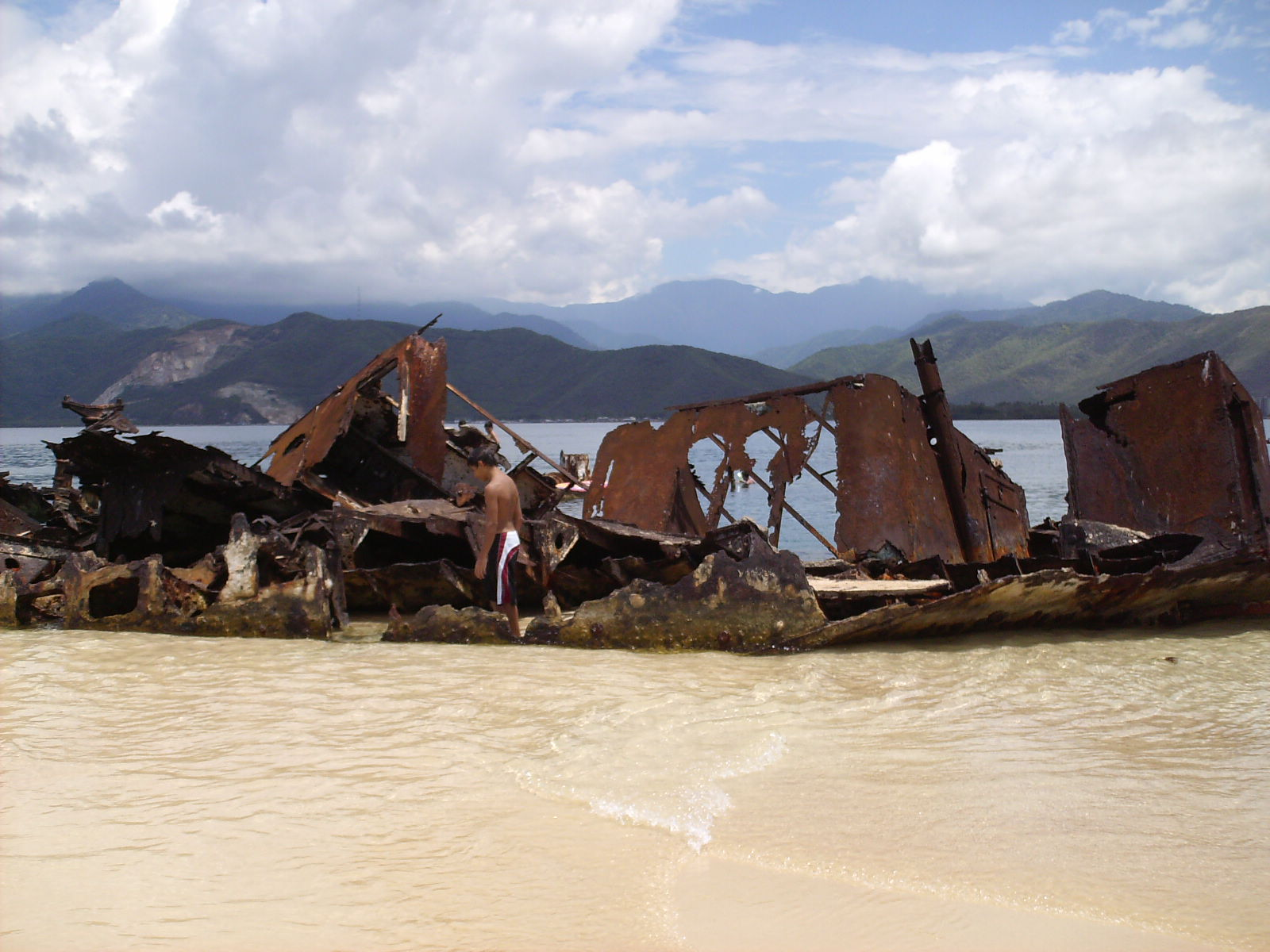
Remains of the German ship "Sesostris" which had taken refuge in Venezuela during the Second World War

In the second half of the 20th century, Carabobo experienced a population explosion. Many immigrants arriving from Europe to Venezuela after WW2 settled down in Valencia and surrounding areas. From the 1970s onwards, immigration came mainly from other Latin American countries. The La Cabrera Tunnel was constructed in the late 1950s using the New Austrian Tunnelling method.

The first local elections for governors took place in 1988. Salas Römer became elected governor of Carabobo. In 2006 the Valencia city metro was inaugurated, making it the third city in the country with a system of this type.

== Geography ==
=== Geology and relief ===
Most of Carabobo State – 75% – is mountainous and part of the Coastal Range. The highest elevations are found throughout the northern part, in the western part of the state and in the southern part of Lake Valencia.

There is a central depression around Lake Valencia and towards the south the plains begin.

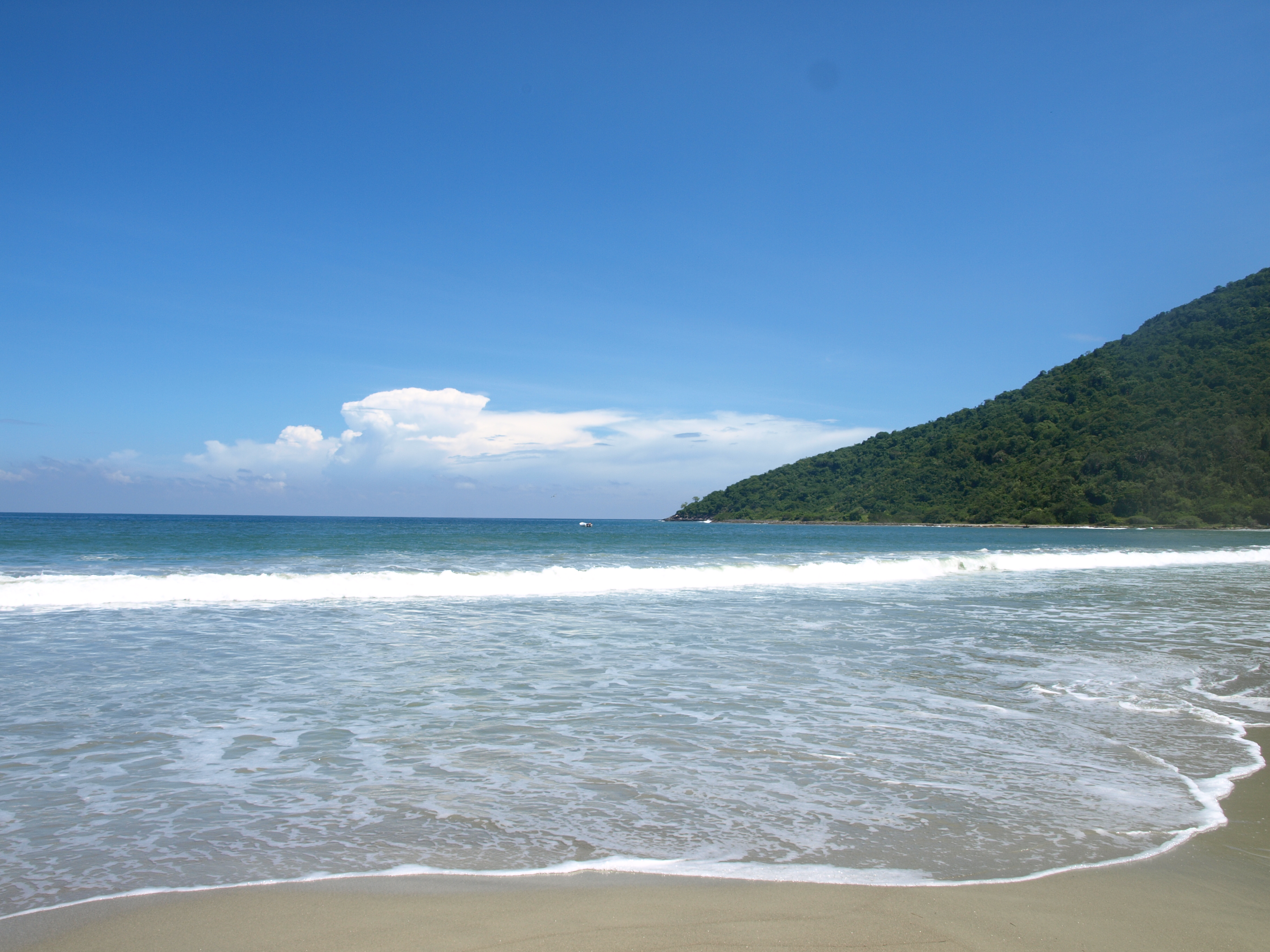
Patanemo Bay, Carabobo

=== Peaks ===
Cobalongo or Caobal Hill, in the municipality of Puerto Cabello, in the north, is the highest point in the state, at 1990 meters above sea level. Other of the highest peaks are:

- The summit of the Copa, with 1800 in the Municipality of Montalbán.
- The summit of Borburata, with 1,680 meters above sea level in the Municipality of Puerto Cabello.
- The Carrizo Real with 1,560 masl in the Municipality of Puerto Cabello.

There is a large number of anticlines, synclines, diaclases, fractures and faults. One of the most important faults is La Victoria, located south of Valencia. This area shows some tectonic activity of moderate importance.

The mountains have very deep slopes. The slopes can exceed 80%. In the plains, the slopes are less than 1%. In the area of the Tocuyito high plateau the slopes reach 5%.

In the State of Carabobo, in front of Puerto Cabello there are a number of small islands:

- Larga Island: it is the largest, with 1855 m long. It is currently part of the San Esteban National Park.
- Santo Domingo Island: it is an island of 463 m at about 928 m west of Isla Larga.
- Ratón Island: it is an islet surrounded by corals at 1390 m southwest of Isla Santo Domingo and 230 m from the mainland.
- Del Rey Island: with 463 m long, is surrounded by corals and reefs.

In Lake Valencia there are also several islands. Some have disappeared due to the rise in the level of the lake since the 1970s. The largest island is Burro Island.

=== Hydrography ===
The State of Carabobo has three hydrographic basins: the Basin of the Caribbean Sea, the Basin of Lake Valencia and the Basin of the South.

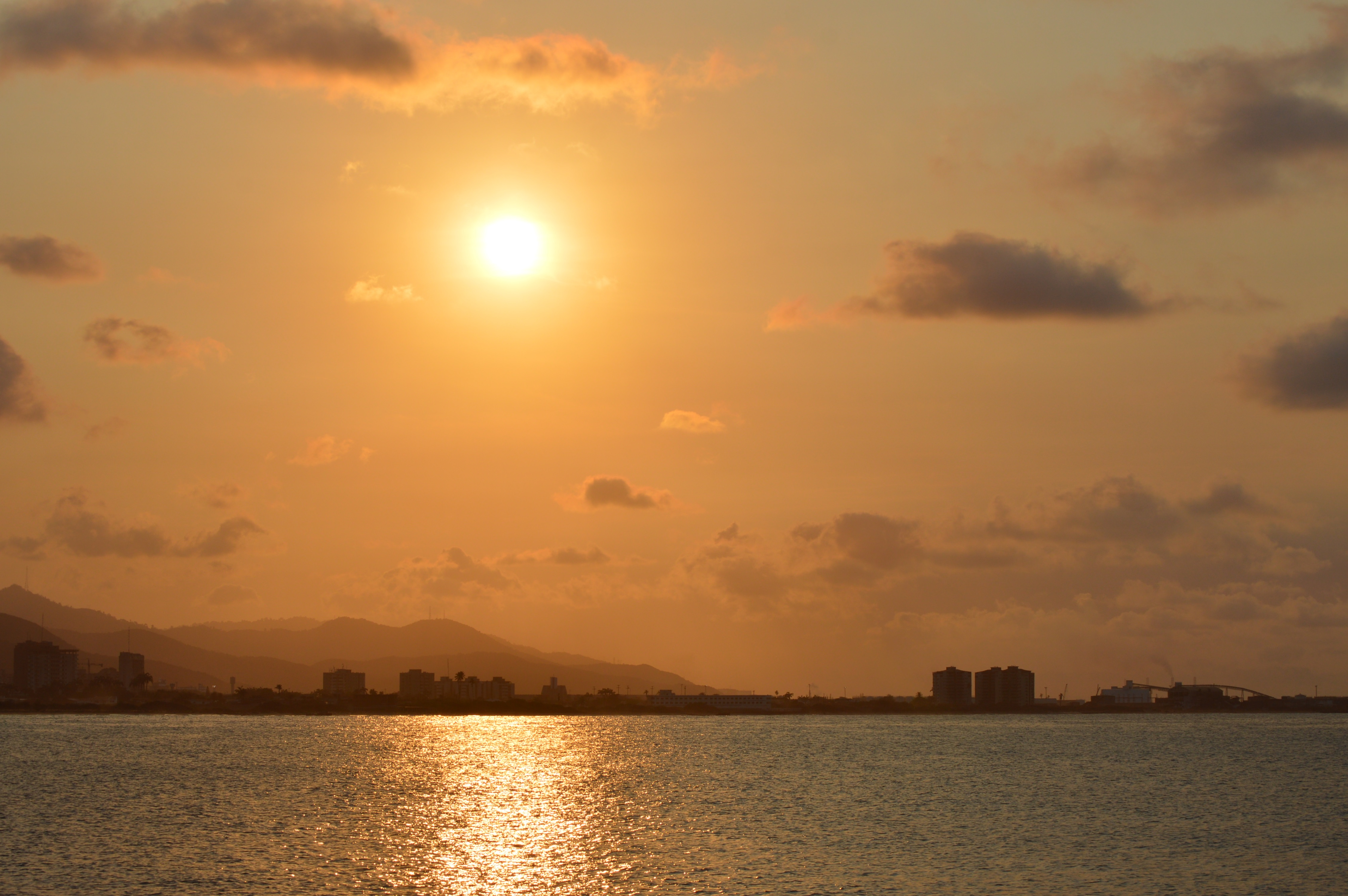
The coast of the state of Carabobo in the Caribbean Sea

==== Caribbean Basin ====
Rivers:

- Aguas Calientes
- Borburata
- Goaigoaza
- Moron
- Patanemo
- Sanchón
- San Esteban: this river rises at the top called Tetas de Hilaria, passes through the town of San Esteban and flows eastwards from Puerto Cabello.
- Urama: the river has its source in the mountains of the Canoabo area and runs for about 62 kilometers.

These rivers generally flow from the northern part of the Coastal Mountain Range into the Caribbean Sea.

==== Basin of Lake Valencia ====
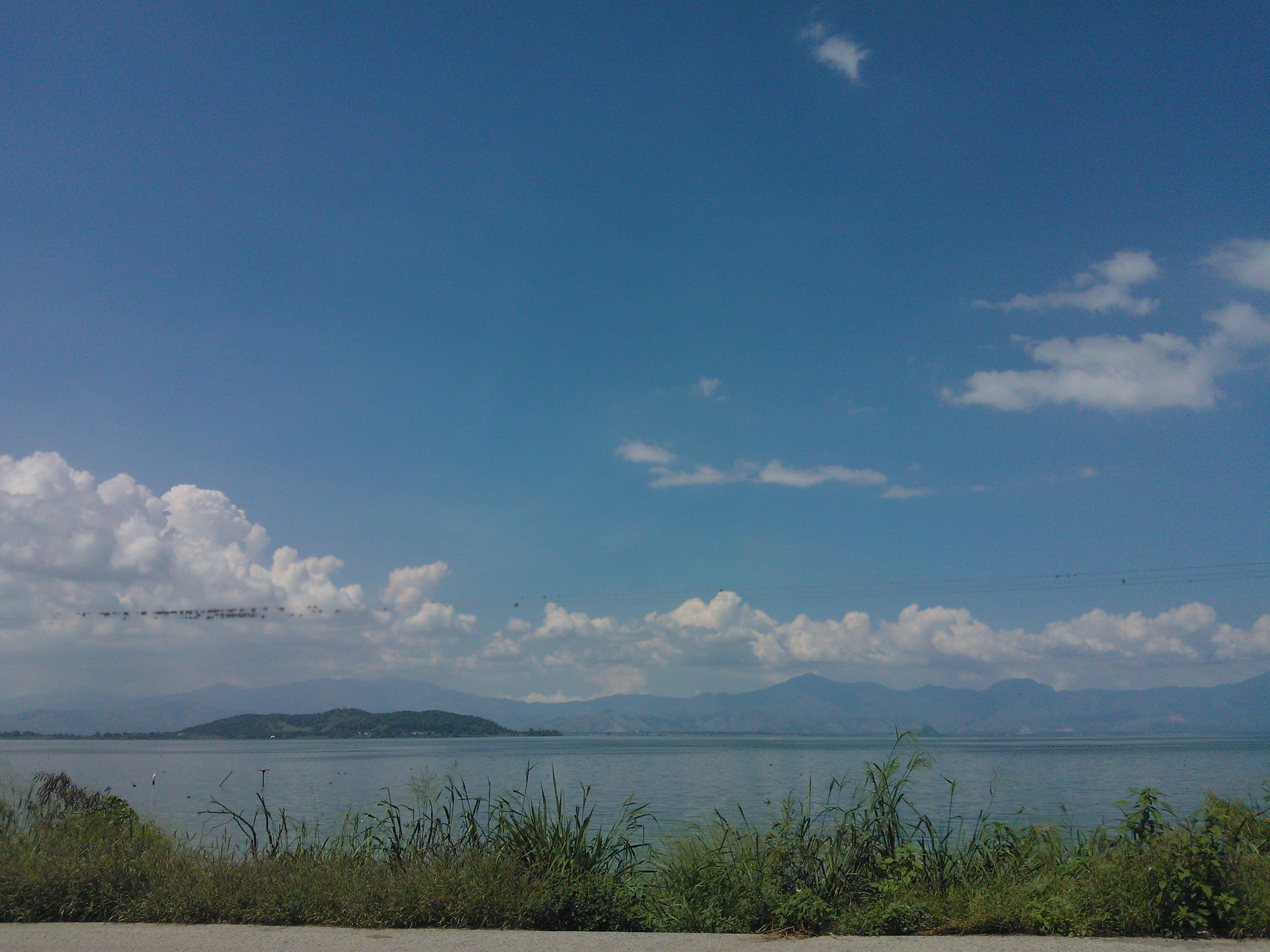
Valencia Lake

Rivers:

- Cabriales River, crosses Valencia from north to south.
- Güigüe River, flows into the south of Valencia Lake.
- Guacara River, flows into the northern shore of Lake Valencia
- Los Guayos River, which flows into the north shore of Valencia Lake, is in danger of disappearing.

All these rivers used to flow into Lake Valencia, although the waters of the Cabriales River have been diverted to the Paíto.

==== Basin of the South ====
Rivers:

- Pao River
- Manaure River

These rivers flow into the Guárico and Portuguesa rivers, which are part of the Orinoco River basin.

=== Terrain and soil ===
Most of the region is covered by mountains that make up part of Venezuela's Coast Mountain Range. The highest peaks are found on the north and west of the state and south of the Valencia Lake. The Cobalongo or Caobal peak is the highest point of the state, at 1990 metres above sea level.

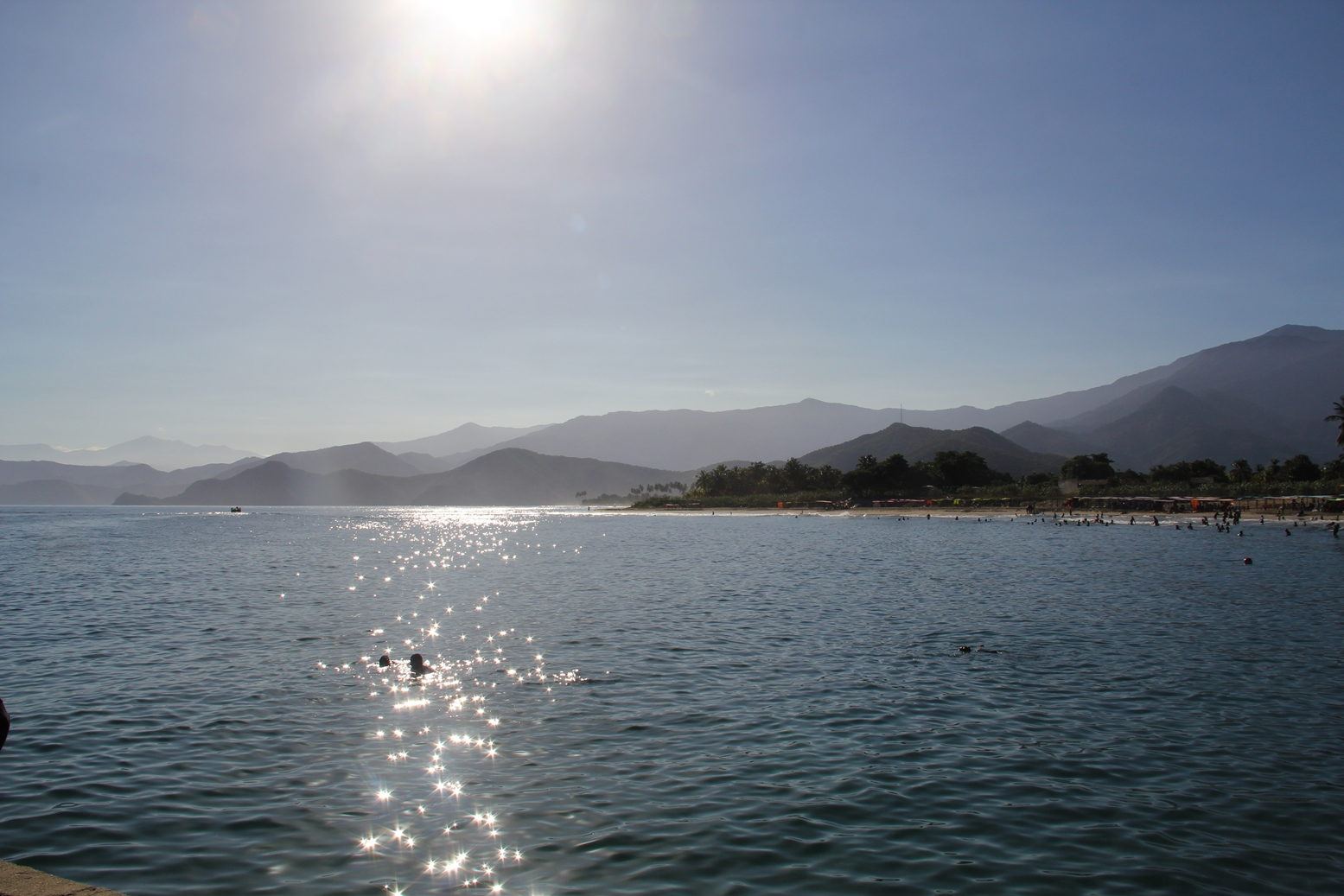
Quizandal Beach, Carabobo State

There is a central low plain around the Valencia Lake and towards the south, where Venezuela's Llanos start.

There is a large amount of anticlinals, synclinals, diaclases, fractures and faults. One of the most important is that of the Victoria, south of Valencia. This area has moderate tectonic activity.

Mountains are very steep; some slopes are over 80%. On the plains, slopes are less than 1%. In the Tocuyito area, slopes can reach 5%.

There are a group of small islands near Puerto Cabello. The main ones are Isla Larga, Isla Santo Domingo, Isla Alcatraz and Isla del Rey. Isla Larga is the largest and is 1855 metres long. It makes part of the San Esteban National Park.

There are also a couple of islands on Lake Valencia. Some more have disappeared after the rise in sea level since the 1970s. Isla del Burro ("Donkey Island") is the largest island of the lake.

Carabobo's soils are fertile. Entisol soils predominate (above all fluvents and orthents). There are also threats of vertisols with suborders of usterts.

=== Fauna ===
The fauna of Carabobo mainly inhabits the tropical forests, grassland surrounding and mountainous landscapes. Though a richly inhabited land, the pollution of many of its lakes and rivers has caused the wildlife of Carabobo to be transformed and mutilated, adapting itself in order to survive. The vast majority of wildlife that remains is predominately birds due to their ability to be able to fly in search of cleaner water.

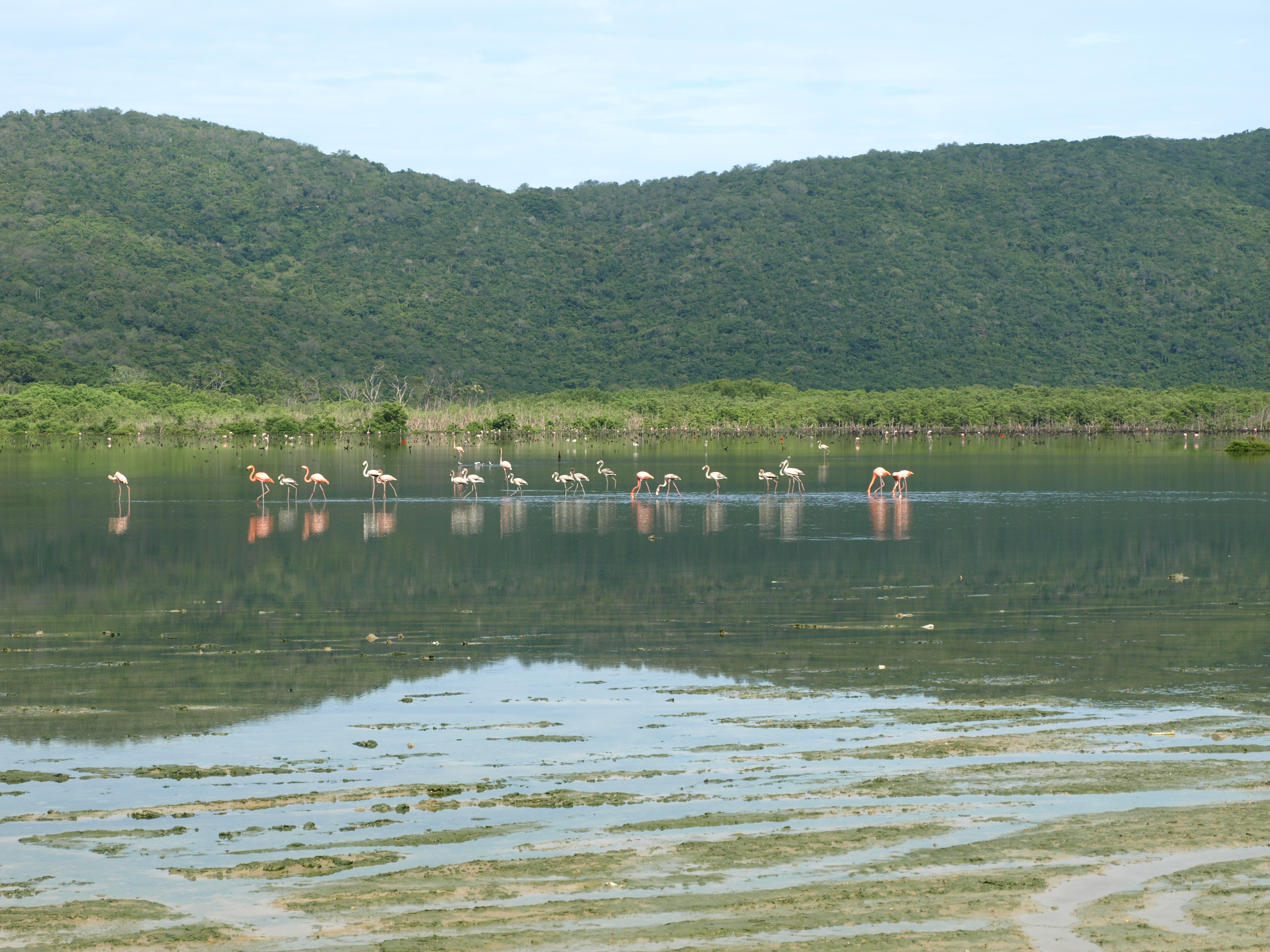
Flamingos are one of the bird species that can be found in the State of Carabobo

Typical fauna include the Frilled Dragon, Carabobo Tree Frogs and Valencia Piscavi.

Wild birds such as the Sugar Glider, Olive-backed Oriole, Whip-tail, Poonbill, Scrub Mullet and Mopoke.

Insects such as Forest Floor Skink are commonly found.

=== Vegetation ===
The State of Carabobo presents a predominantly tropical vegetation. Among the most typical species are carob trees, apamates, camorucos, caobas, cedars, guamos, carabobo palms, samanes, among others. On the coast you can find mangroves like the red Rhizophora mangle, as well as beach grapes (Coccoloba uvifera) and coconut trees (Cocos nucifera).

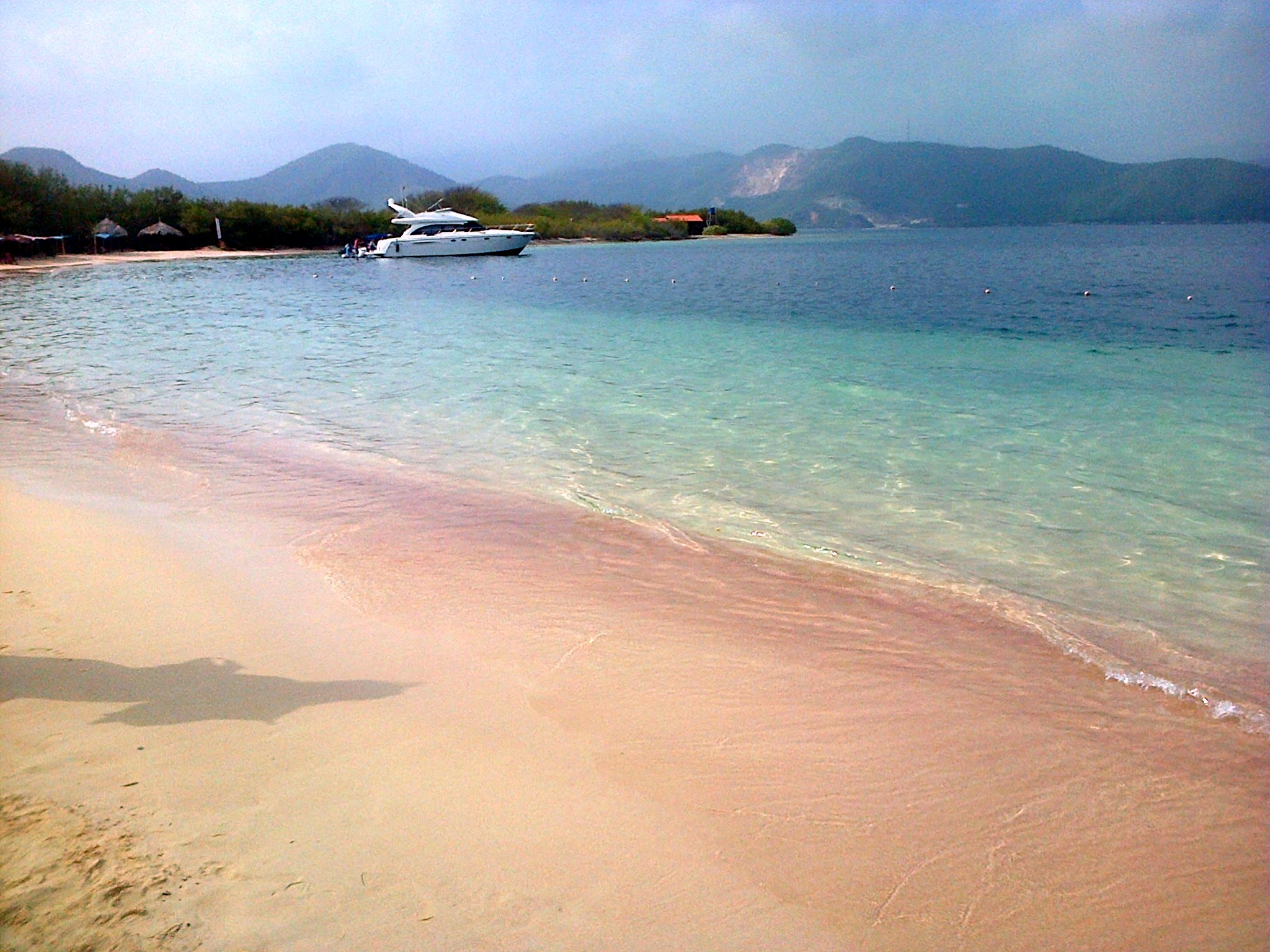
Isla Larga (Long Island), Carabobo

Alexander von Humboldt reported that in 1800 there were still large numbers of Araguatos in the forests south of Valencia. He also mentioned the presence of caimans (Caiman crocodilus) in Lake Valencia, which do not exist there today. Already by that time Alexander von Humboldt mentioned that the lake's shores, which had been covered with forests at the time of the beginning of European colonization, were treeless.

=== Parks, Green Zones and Zoos ===
- San Esteban National Park: located south of Puerto Cabello and north of the Municipality of Naguanagua, the Municipality of San Diego and the Municipality of Guacara, (the latter three municipalities belonging to the Valencia Metropolitan Area). This park was created in 1987, with an extension of 44,500 ha, an annual rainfall of 1033 mm and an average monthly temperature of 25.1 °C. It borders Henri Pittier National Park to the east. One of its main attractions is Fortín Solano.
- Henri Pittier National Park: is the oldest national park in Venezuela, originally created in 1937 with the name of Rancho Grande by decree of President Eleazar López Contreras. The park was renamed in 1953 with the name of Henri Pittier, a famous Swiss geographer, botanist and ethnologist, who arrived in Venezuela in 1917, classified more than 30 thousand plants in the country and dedicated himself for many years to the study of the flora and fauna existing in the park. It has an area of 107,800 hectares, located in the northern part of the State of Aragua, and includes a large part of the Araguan coasts and the mountainous area of the State of Carabobo, as well as bordering the San Esteban National Park. Henri Pittier is the largest national park among the national parks of the Cordillera de la Costa.
- Fernando Peñalver Park: is a large park of 21 km^{2} (210 ha) located on the banks of the Cabriales River in the city of Valencia, which has an art gallery and facilities for holding children's and cultural festivals, as well as being an area for entertainment, recreation, physical activity, relaxation, among others.
- Parque Recreacional del Sur: park located in the Miguel Peña Parish in the Municipality of Valencia. Next to the park is the Monumental Bullring of Valencia and places for musical and cultural events, as well as areas for recreation, entertainment, physical activity, among others.
- Hipolita Black Park: large park located next to the Fernando Peñalver Park, which despite its proximity and being originally planned as stages of the same park at the time of its construction, are considered different

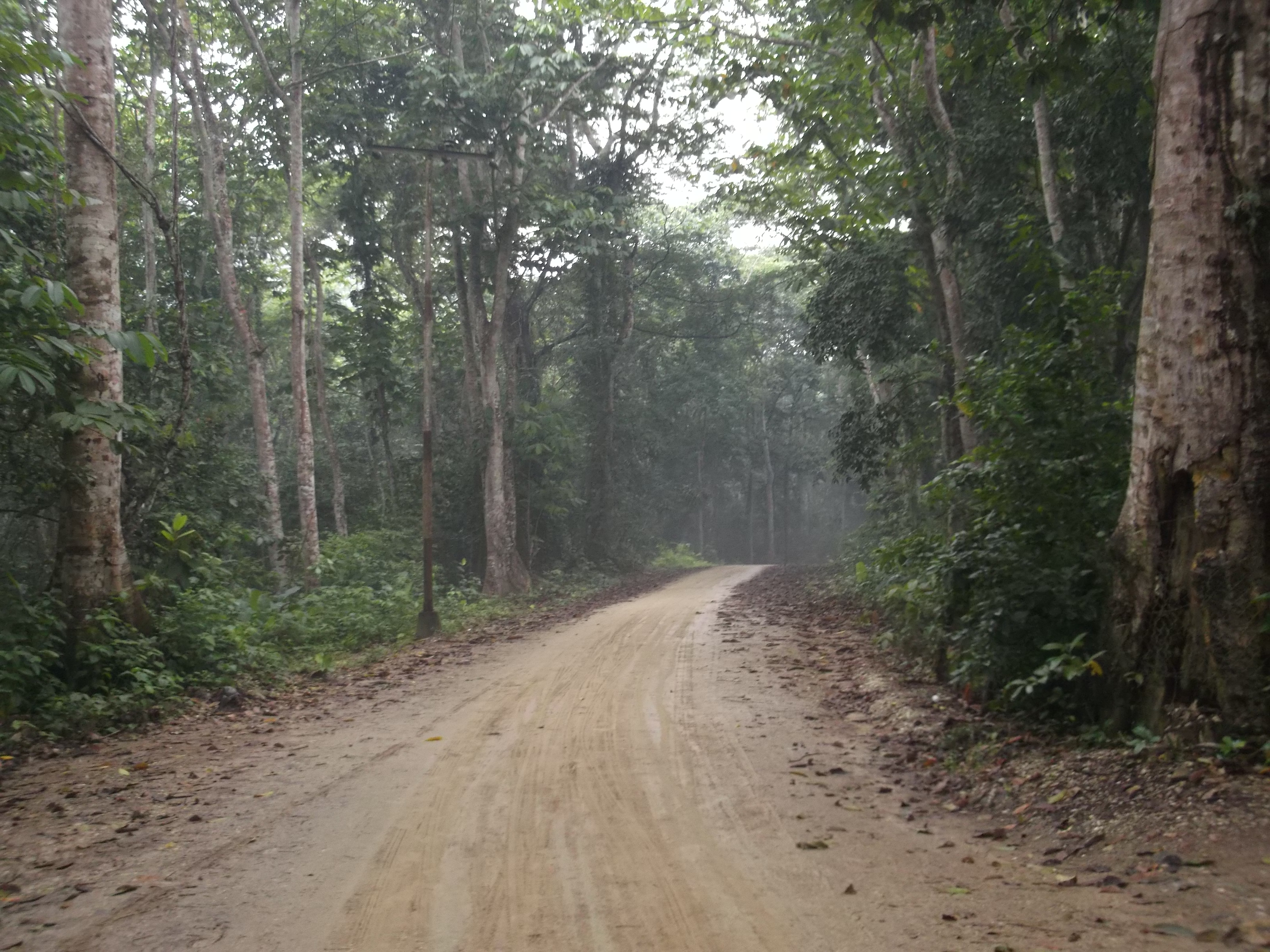
Dirt road in San Esteban National Park

- Metropolitan Park of Valencia: located south of the Fernando Peñalver Park, in the 94th Avenue at the height of the Paseo Cabriales Avenue (Valencia).
- Valencia Aquarium: it includes one of the largest aquariums in Latin America, with the only trained pink dolphins in the world. It also includes a zoo, a terrarium and a serpentarium, these facilities being in what was the first aqueduct in the city. In August 2011, its infrastructure was reconditioned for the comfort of visitors and the animals exhibited there. The construction of the New Aquarium of Valencia, to the east of the city, is currently underway.
- Cerro Casupo Municipal Park: located in the western part of the city, it is one of the main green lungs of the city. It has about 693 hectares26 The highest part of Casupo Park is about 800 metres high (approx.).
- Naguanagua Botanical Garden: is a botanical garden located in the south of the Naguanagua Municipality in Valencia.
- Palmetum University Park: it is the Botanical Garden of the University of Carabobo, located in the Bárbula University City. It has an area of 40 hectares. It is an area dedicated to the ex situ conservation of palms. This space is constituted by 2000 specimens belonging to 92 species of palms and is organized in three sectors: Palms of the World, Venezuelan Palms, and the Wetland. The garden has been developed through successive plantings and maintenance in which members of the university community have participated.
- Guataparo Dam: (known as Dique de Guataparo), located northwest (NW) of the city of Valencia, was initially contemplated as a water supplier to the capital of the Caribbean just before the industrialization process. At present, it represents a compensatory reserve of drinking water. Over time it has become a tourist attraction because of the natural beauty of the surrounding area, the jungle of fauna and flora found there, made it be decreed a refuge for birds. Nowadays, it is an area of physical and extreme activity.
- FACES Gardens: it is a garden located inside the University of Carabobo in the Bárbula University City. In it you can find the well known Laguna de Faces, also known as the Bárbula Lagoon.

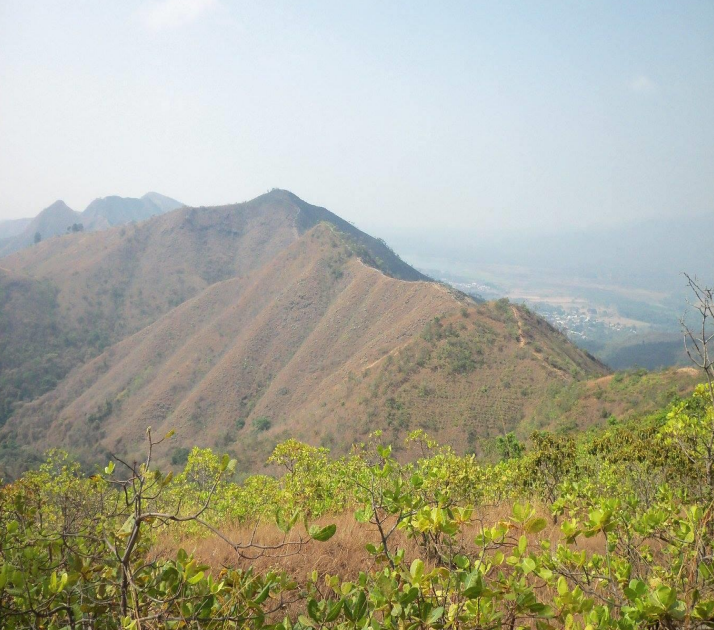
Cerro Casupo Park

- San Diego Botanical Garden: opened in 2014, it is a botanical garden located east of the Municipality of San Diego east of the city of Valencia.
- Parque Guaparo: located in the Urbanización Guaparo (Valencia), northwest of the city. It is a recreational park where you can do physical activities, relaxation, among others.
- Alejandro de Humboldt Park: Previously also called Los Enanitos Park.
- Metropolitan Park of San Diego: located in the municipality of San Diego, northeast of the city of Valencia.
- Metropolitan Park of Naguanagua: located in the municipality of Naguanagua.
- Dr. Carlos Sanda Park: located in Valencia's Casco Central, closed by the municipal authorities.

== Politics and government ==
The State of Carabobo, as one of the 23 States of Venezuela and based on the provisions of the National Constitution of Venezuela of 1999, has its own public powers, which include a Governor, advised by a Cabinet of Secretaries, a Secretary General and an Attorney General, a Comptroller, its own State Police, Flag, Shield, Hymn and a Regional Parliament called the Legislative Council of 15 members. The basic law at the state level is the Constitution of the State of Carabobo of 7 January 1991. Together with the 2005 Law on the Organization of the Public Administration of the State of Carabobo, the Constitution and other national and state laws constitute the basis of the Carabobian legal system.

=== Executive Power ===
It is composed of the Governor of the State of Carabobo and a group of State Secretaries. The Governor is elected by the people through direct and secret vote for a period of four years and with the possibility of immediate reelection without restriction of periods, being in charge of the state administration.

=== Legislative Power ===
The state legislature is the responsibility of the Carabobo State Legislative Council. It is unicameral. Its members are elected by the people through direct and secret vote every four years, and may be reelected without restriction of terms, according to the provisions of the constitutional amendment of 14 February 2009, under a system of proportional representation of the population of the state and its municipalities. The functions of the Legislative Council are to produce amendments or reforms to the Constitution of the State of Carabobo, to sanction laws related to it, to approve its budget, to appoint or dismiss its Comptroller, to evaluate the annual report of the governor and to control the administration bodies and authorize additional credits, among others.

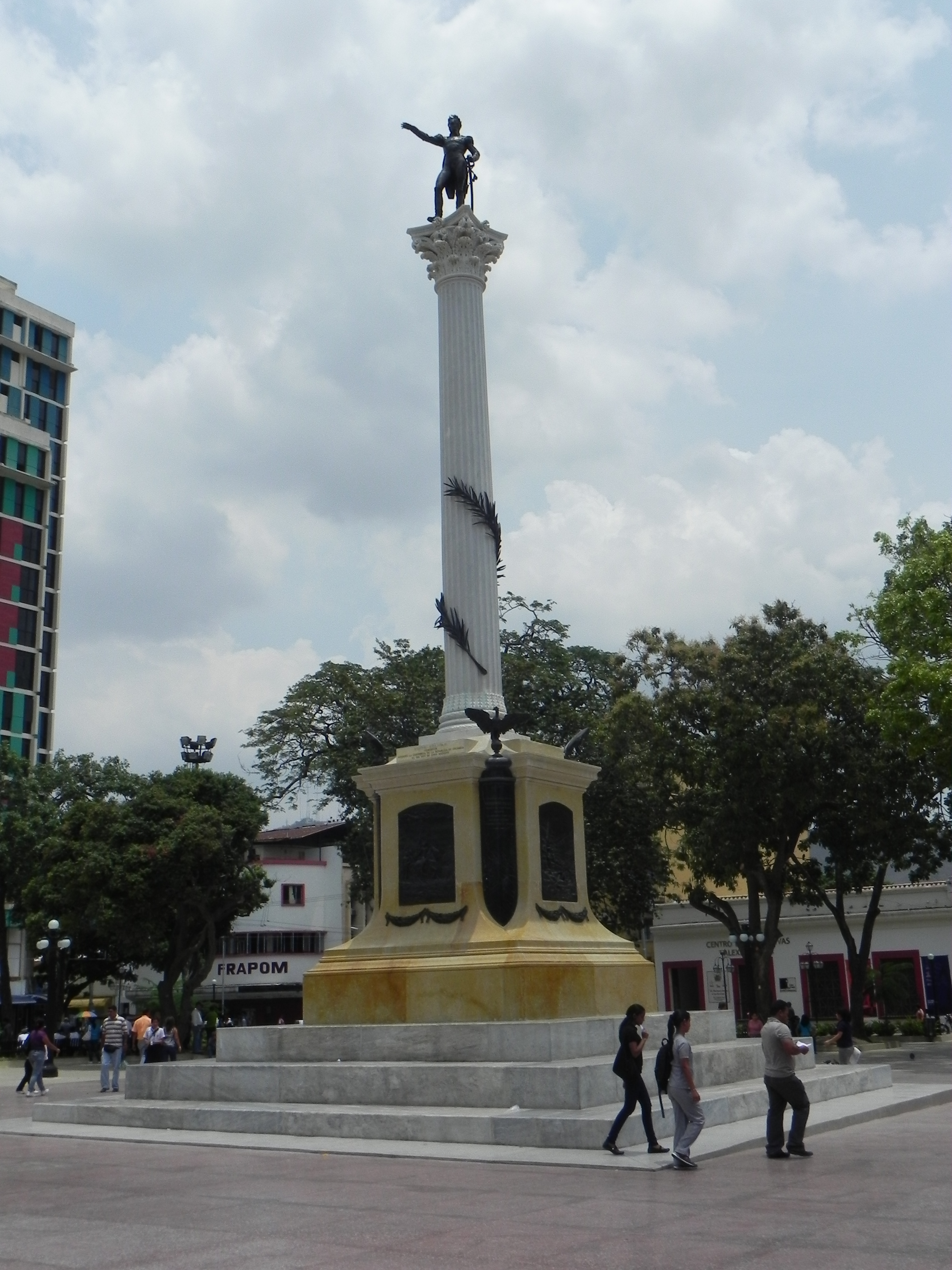
Bolívar Square of Valencia

Currently, two parties are represented: Proyecto Venezuela and the United Socialist Party of Venezuela. The State has 15 deputies, of which 6 belong to PROVE and 9 to the PSUV. The current president of the Legislative Council is Augusto Martínez (PSUV), and the vice president is Blas González (PSUV).

=== State Police ===
Carabobo as one of the 23 States of Venezuela and based on the provisions of Article 164 of the Constitution of Venezuela of 1999 and the police law issued by the State Legislative Council, has its own Autonomous Police Force with regional jurisdiction called Carabobo State Police assigned to the Secretariat of Citizen Security of the Regional Government.

== Municipalities and municipal seats ==
Carabobo State is sub-divided into 14 municipalities:

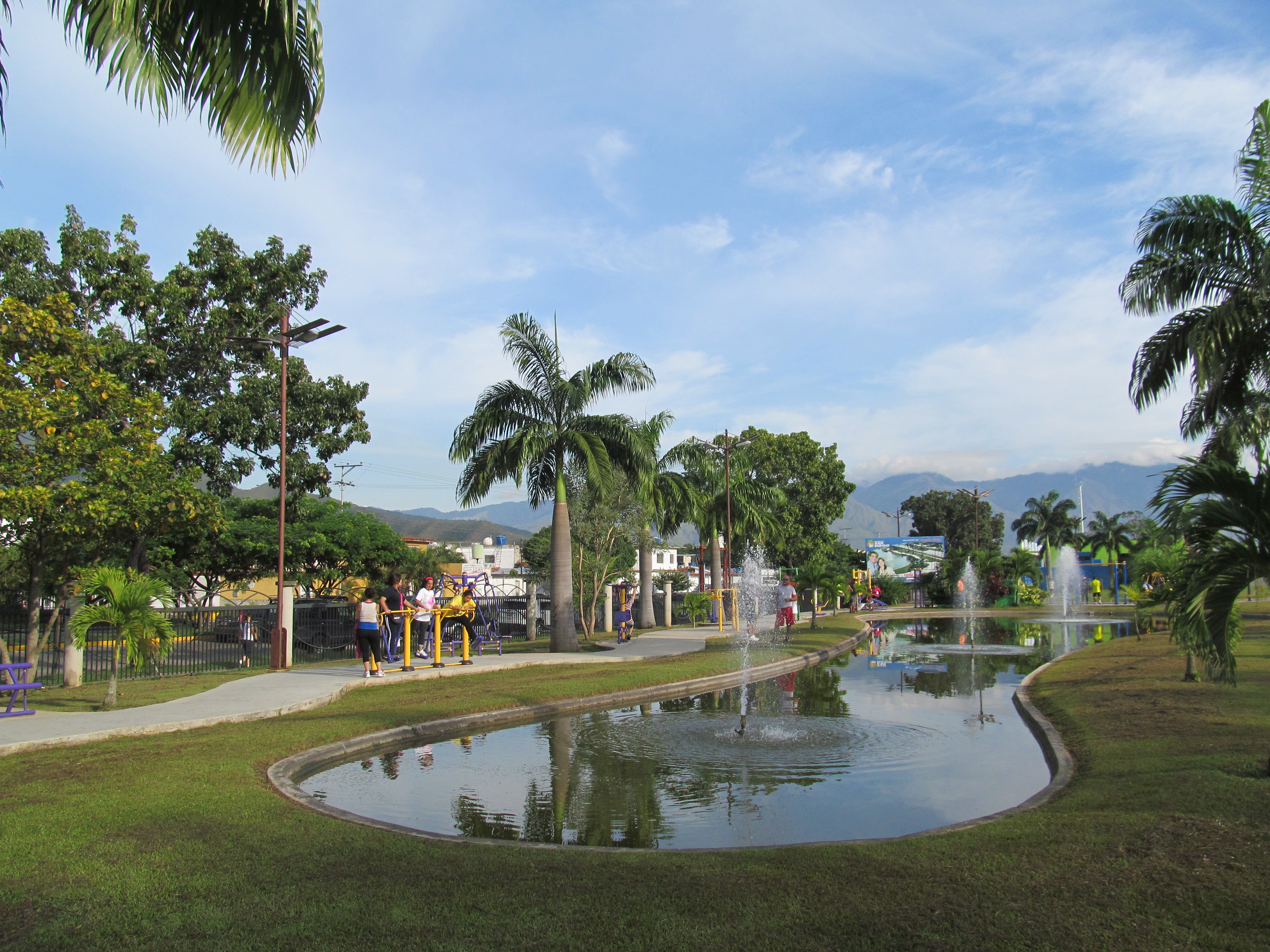
San Diego Metropolitan Park, San Diego Municipality

Municipality	Seat	Population	Area (km^{2})	Density (inhabitants/km^{2})	Parishes
Bejuma	Bejuma	46,041	469	98.17	Bejuma, Canoabo, Simón Bolívar
Carlos Arvelo	Güigüe	149,313	835	178.82	Güigüe, Belén, Tacarigua
Diego Ibarra	Mariara	111,938	79	1416.94	Aguas Calientes, Mariara
Guacara	Guacara	174,868	165	1,059.81	Guacara, Yagua, Ciudad Alianza
Juan José Mora	Morón	66,269	453	146.29	Morón, Urama
Libertador	Tocuyito	178,904	558	320.62	Tocuyito, Independencia
Los Guayos	Los Guayos	161,341	73	2,210.15	Los Guayos
Miranda	Miranda	28,135	161	174.75	Miranda
Montalbán	Montalbán	24,154	107	225.74	Montalbán
Naguanagua	Naguanagua	144,308	188	767.70	Naguanagua
Puerto Cabello	Puerto Cabello	196,942	729	270.15	Bartolomé Salón, Democracia, Fraternidad, Goaigoaza, Juan José Flores, Unión, Borburata, Patanemo
San Diego	San Diego	77,154	106	727.87	San Diego
San Joaquín	San Joaquín	62,777	127	494.31	San Joaquín
Valencia	Valencia	839,926	623	1,348.20	Candelaria, Catedral, El Socorro, Miguel Peña Parish, Rafael Urdaneta, San Blas, San José, Santa Rosa, Negro Primero

The municipalities are made up of one or more civic parishes. Carabobo has a total of 38 parishes.

== Demographics ==
Historical population
Year	Pop.	±% p.a.
1873	113,715	—
1881	132,316	+1.91%
1891	165,156	+2.24%
1920	125,514	−0.94%
1926	147,205	+2.69%
1936	172,127	+1.58%
1941	191,442	+2.15%
1950	242,923	+2.68%
1961	381,636	+4.19%
1971	659,339	+5.62%
1981	1,062,268	+4.88%
1990	1,453,232	+3.54%
2001	1,932,168	+2.62%
2011	2,245,744	+1.52%
Source: "XIV CENSO NACIONAL DE POBLACIÓN Y VIVIENDA – Resultados por Entidad Federal y Municipio del Estado Carabobo" (PDF). Instituto Nacional de Estadística.

=== Race and ethnicity ===
According to the 2011 Census, the racial composition of the population was:

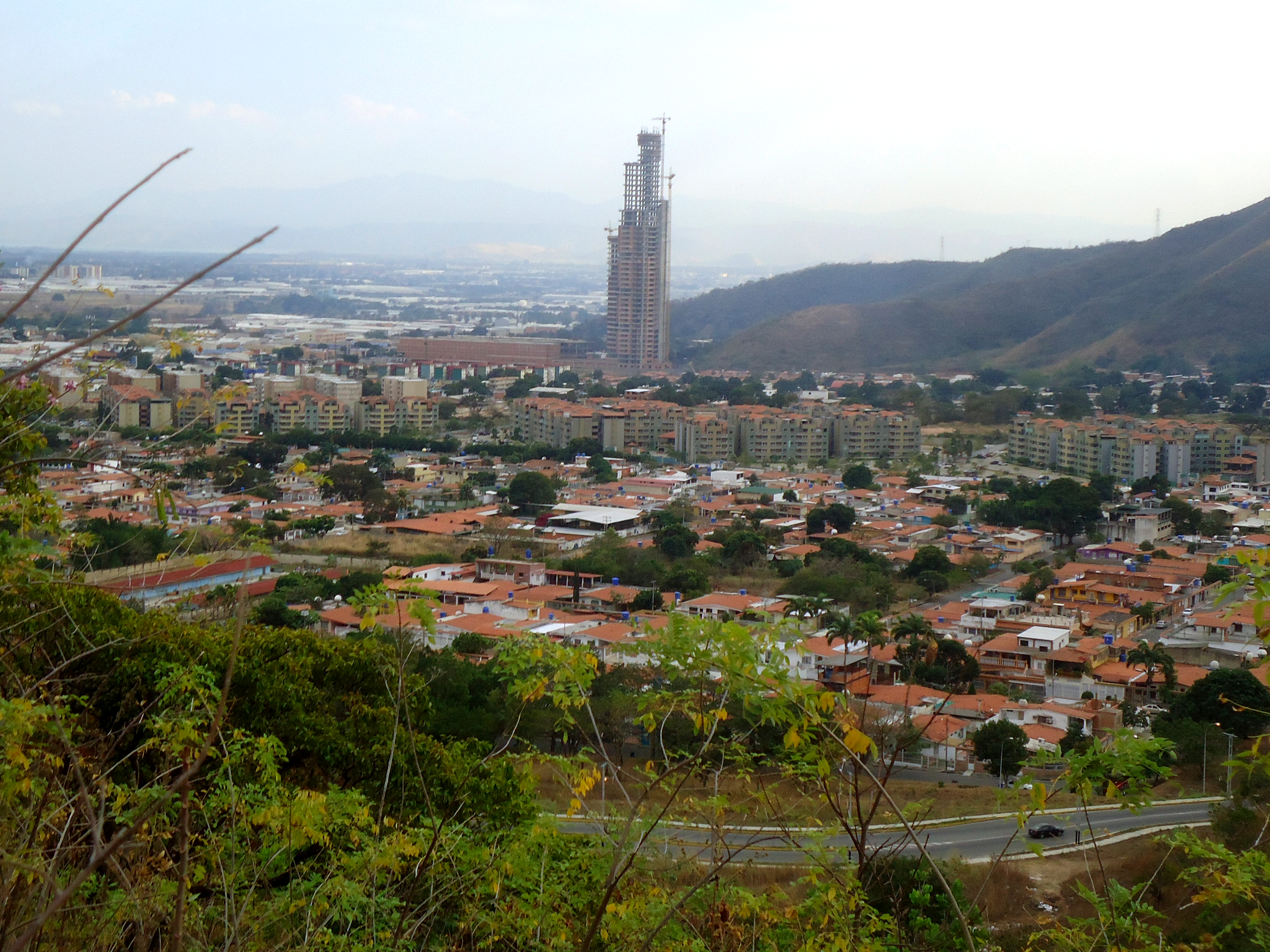
San Diego, Valencia

Racial composition	Population	%
Mestizo	—N/a	53.0
White	1,010,138	44.9
Black	82,798	1.3
Other race	—N/a	0.8

== Education ==
The main university in the region is the University of Carabobo, with around 40,000 students. There are also a series of private universities and colleges, like:

- Universidad Arturo Michelena
- Universidad José Antonio Páez.
- Universidad Tecnológica del Centro.
- Colegio Universitario Padre Isaías Ojeda (CUPIO)
- Universidad Nacional Experimental Politécnica de la Fuerza Armada (Núcleos en Valencia y Puerto Cabello).
- Universidad Nacional Experimental Simón Rodríguez (Decanato Valencia y Nucleo Canoabo)
- Instituto Universitario de Tecnología Valencia
- Universidad Santiago Mariño
- Universidad Alejandro Humboldt

=== Science and Technology ===
Among the main research centres Carabobo counts with FUNDACITE (Foundation for the Development of Technology in Carabobo) as well as the University of Carabobo, specially the Faculty for Science and Technology.

== Economy ==
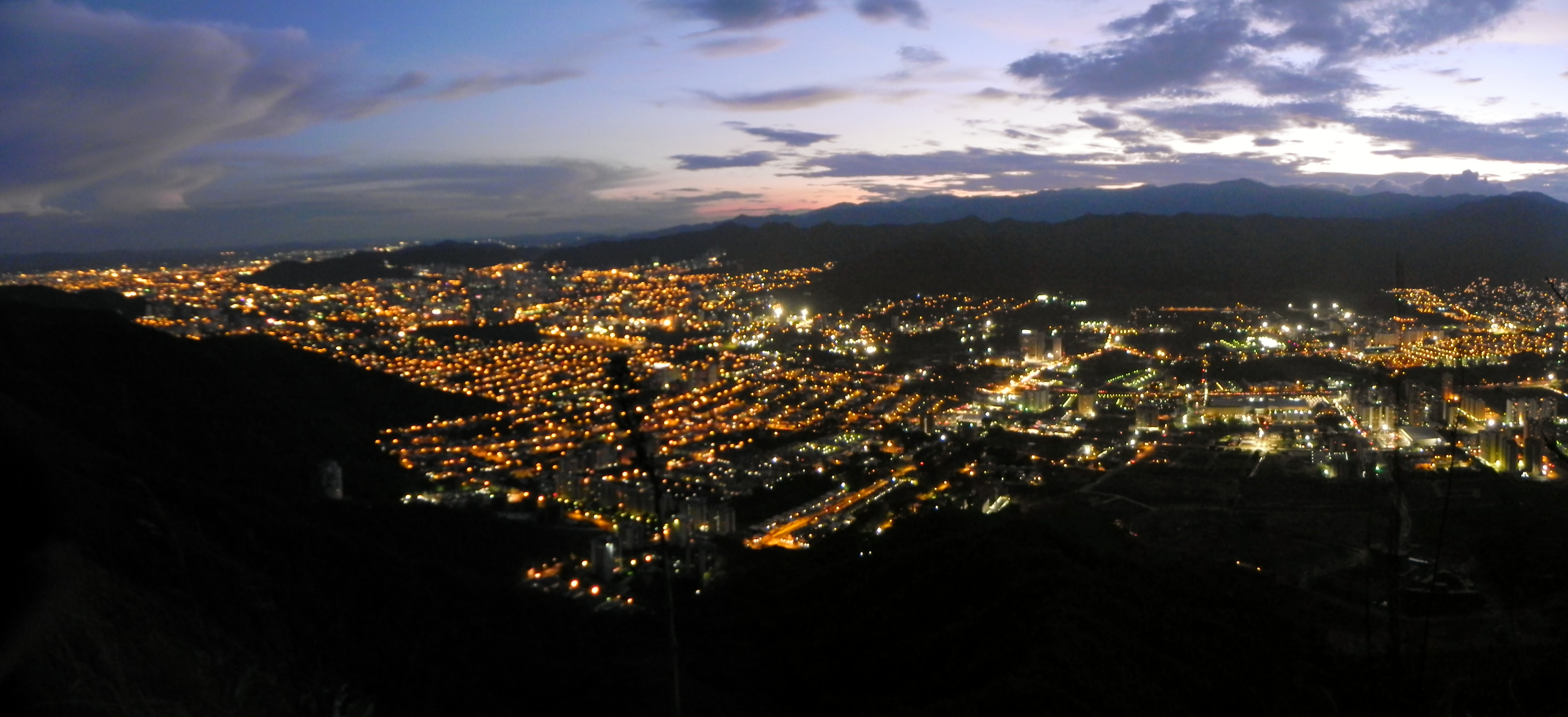
Valencia is the economic engine of the State of Carabobo

=== Industry ===
The most important industries in Carabobo include food processing, textiles, galvanizing, chemical, petrochemical, metal-mechanic, car assembling, fuel, liquified gas, ceramics and paper factories. The industrial centres are located in southern Valencia and in Guacara. The state-owned petrochemical and oil industrial complex of PDVSA (Complejo de Refinería El Palito) is located on the western coast, close to Morón. A major oil distribution centre is in Yagua.

=== Service industry ===
The region is seat to important shopping and entertainment centres. Tourism, mainly local, plays an important role.

=== Agriculture ===
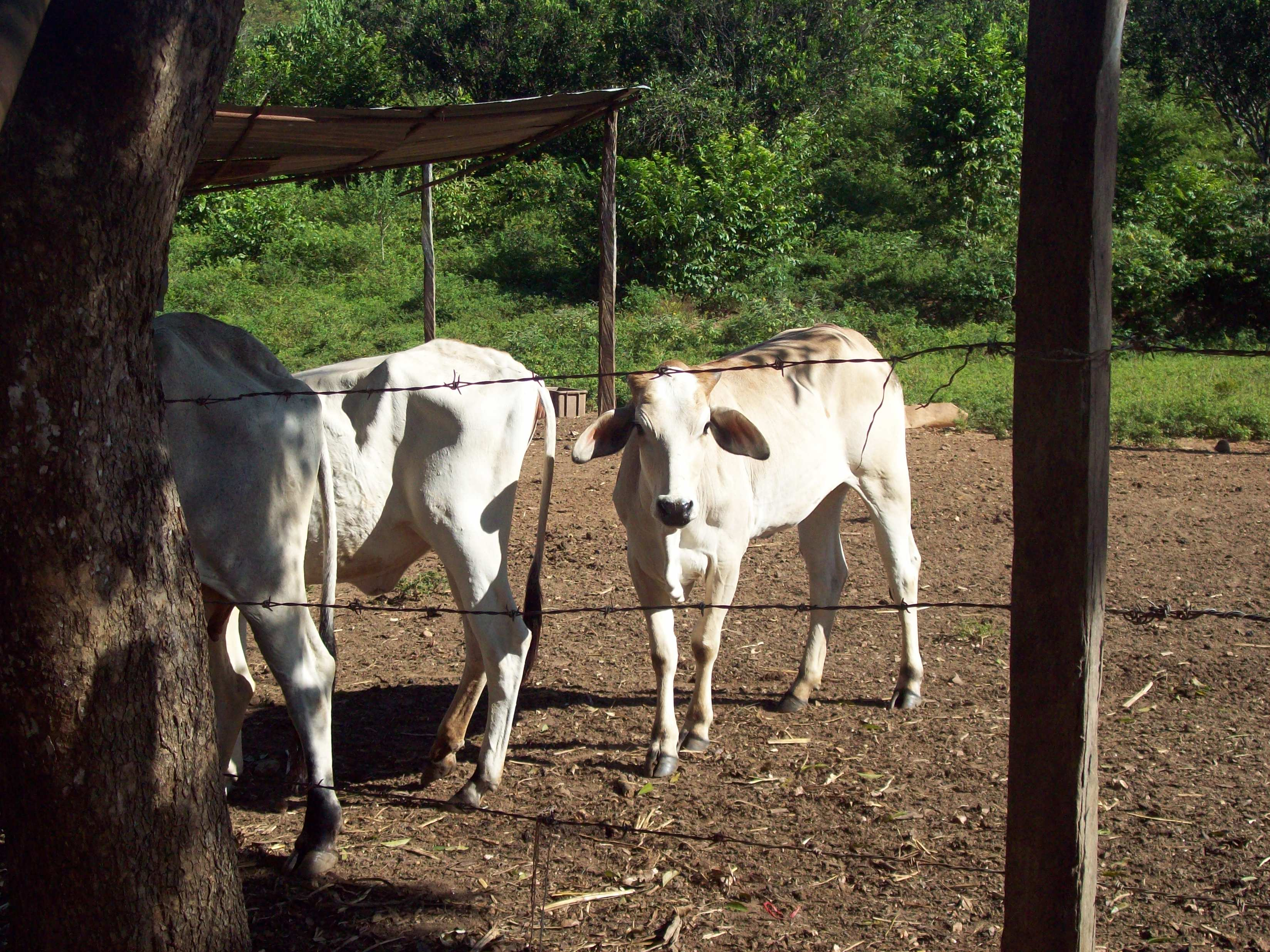
Cattle in the municipality of Bejuma

Agriculture is concentrated to the north and south of Lake Valencia, as well as in the western municipalities (Bejuma, Miranda and Montalbán). In total there are some 79,450 ha used for agriculture at present. The soils around Lake Valencia are highly productive. Unfortunately, in the northern part of the lake many agricultural areas give way to the construction of urbanizations, even though they are under protection. Among the main agricultural products are: corn, grain legumes, cocoa, tobacco, cotton, sugar cane, vegetables, coconut and fish products. In the State of Carabobo there are also forest resources such as carob tree, apamate, camoruco, mahogany, cedar and guamo Saman.

Carabobo is the second largest producer of chicken in Venezuela. Cattle and pig farming is important. Many of the farms in this sector are located in the southern zone of Lake Valencia (Diego Ibarra Municipality, San Joaquin Municipality) and in the western part of the state. Currently, the Venezuelan government is developing a bilateral agreement with Argentina to increase cattle breeding in the aforementioned geographical area and thus contribute to boosting cattle development in Venezuela.

Among the mineral resources are: ceramic clay, sand, diatomite, dolomite, marble and serpentine.

=== Petrochemicals ===
==== Moron Petrochemical Complex ====
Venezuela's main petrochemical industry is located in the state of Carabobo, specifically on the western coast of the state, (Morón), in the Petrochemical Complex of Morón (the largest in the country). In this complex is the company Petroquímica de Venezuela (Pequiven), a PDVSA subsidiary, which is dedicated to the production and commercialization of petrochemical products with export capacity, but giving priority to the domestic market.

The three main business line products on which the corporation is based, which offers more than 40 petrochemical products to the national and international markets, are Fertilizers, industrial chemicals and olefins and plastic resins.

Its links with important partners in the formation of joint ventures in which it participates have facilitated its consolidation and presence in markets in the region, as well as in other parts of the planet.

==== El Palito Refinery ====
The El Palito refinery is one of the largest oil refining complexes in Venezuela. It is located in the municipality of Puerto Cabello, near the town of El Palito, on the coast of the state of Carabobo, in Venezuela. It currently has a maximum processing capacity of 140,000 barrels of crude oil per day.31 This complex, controlled by the company Petróleos de Venezuela (PDVSA), supplies fuel and derivatives to the central-western part of the country through a system of polyducts that supply the El Palito, Yagua and Barquisimeto distribution plants.

The El Palito refinery complex was the first refinery complex in Venezuela with electricity self-management and synchronous interconnection with the national electricity system. It is also where unleaded and oxygenated gasoline production began for the first time and where catalytic reforming was incorporated for the first time and where both the benzene, toluene and ortho-xylene (BTX) plant and the electrostatic precipitator were installed.

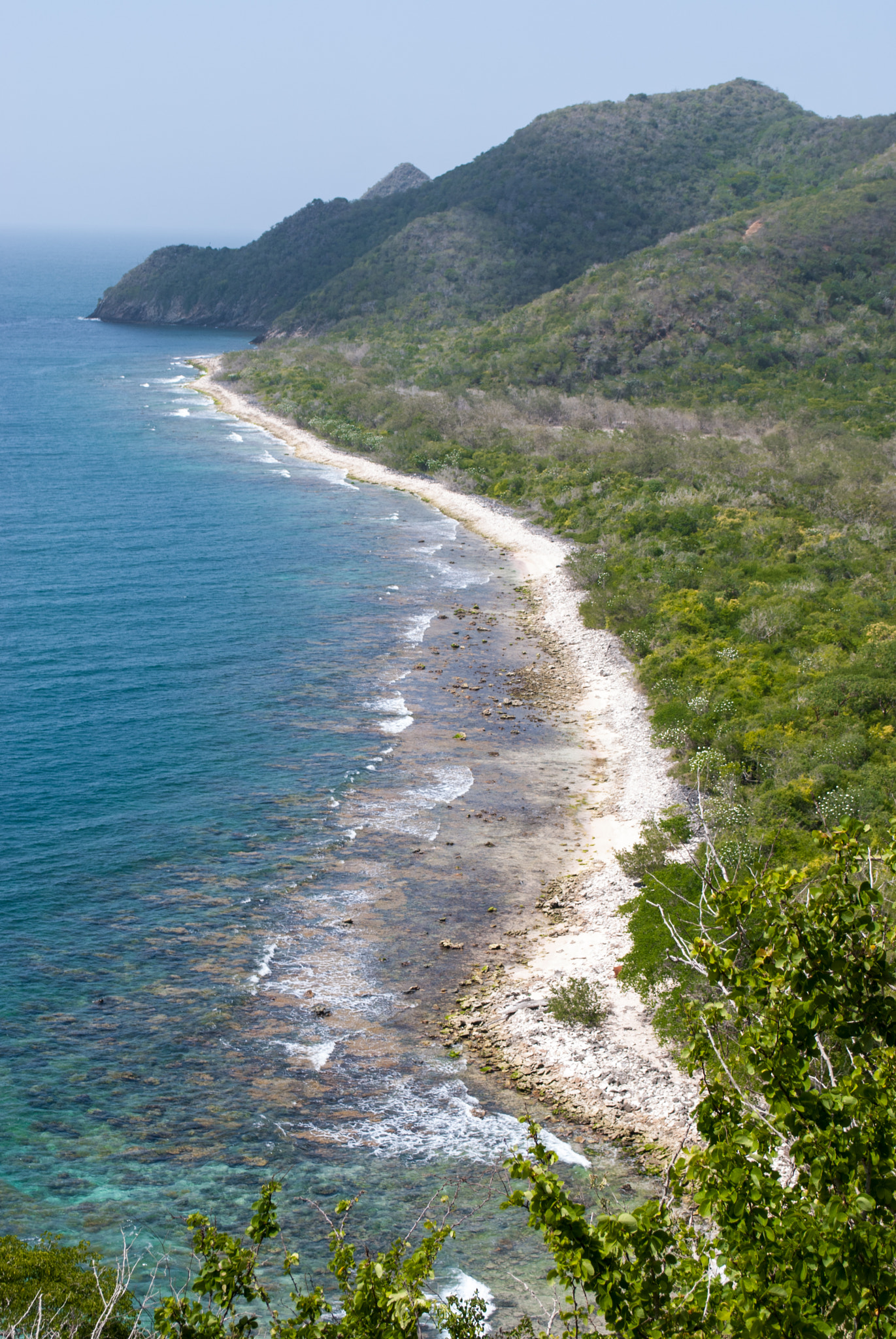
The Carabobo coast has several beaches, islands, bays and mountains

== Transport ==
The State of Carabobo is connected to the rest of the country through a network of highways and roads maintained by the National Government and INVIAL. Due to problems in calculating the speed of population growth and the lack of projects aimed at the long-term development of the city of Valencia, both the streets and the main highways and avenues throughout the state are constantly congested. Carabobeños, in order to find out about the state of traffic on the Autopista Regional del Centro (ARC) that connects Valencia to other cities, listen to the Victoria FM 103.9 radio station and read the reports of the passers-by themselves on social networks such as Twitter. The city has various cameras at different points on its road sections, especially on the main avenues and motorways in the town, and these videos can be seen on the website of El Carabobeño, one of the city's main newspapers.

=== Highways and roads ===
The State of Carabobo has one of the best road networks in the country. Among them, the following stand out:

- Trunk 1 or Regional Highway of the center (ARC) or also called Highway Caracas – Valencia, which connects all the Great Valencia and great part of the Carabobo State with the rest of the Central Region of Venezuela like the cities of Maracay, Caracas, adjacent zones, and with the east of the country. This motorway is the busiest and most important road in Venezuela.
- Guacara – Bárbula Variant Highway, which connects the Central Regional Highway in its section of Guacara with the municipalities of San Diego, Naguanagua and Los Guayos and continues north on the Valencia – Puerto Cabello Highway. It receives the identification Ramal 1 and Local 001.
- Autopista Circunvalación del Este: continuation of the Autopista Regional del Centro, and goes from the centre of Valencia to the north and Naguanagua. It ends at the Bárbula Distributor and continues to the east with the Variante and to the northwest with the Valencia – Puerto Cabello Highway.
- Valencia – Puerto Cabello Highway: it connects the north of Valencia and Naguanagua with Puerto Cabello and extends towards San Felipe, Barquisimeto and the rest of the west and forms a continuation of the East Ring Road and the Variante and, like these, receives the Trunk 1 identifier.
- Valencia – Campo Carabobo Highway, which becomes highway number 5 and connects Valencia with Tinaquillo and from there with the west of Venezuela.
- Autopista Circunvalación del Sur: also known as the Southern Highway, it joins the center and south of the Municipality of Valencia, where most of the city's population is concentrated. It starts from the San Blas Distributor, where it joins the Autopista Regional del Centro and the Autopista Circunvalación del Este, with which it has a clear continuity. Its distributors are simple, and allow access to important avenues in the city. These are the Michelena Distributor (access to Avenida Michelena), Los Samanes Distributor (access to Avenida Circunvalación de los Samanes), El Palotal Distributor (access to Avenida Las Ferias also called Avenida Bolivar Sur), and the Aranzazu Distributor (access to Avenida Aranzazu). After this, the highway continues, with numerous accesses of lesser importance and crossing the Libertador Municipality, until it divides and forms the José Antonio Páez Highway, which communicates the city with the western plains; and the road that allows access to the populations of the high valleys of the city.
- José Antonio Páez Highway: also known as the Llanos Highway, it communicates the states of Barinas, Carabobo, Cojedes and Portuguesa. The highway is still under construction, however several sections have already been opened. It begins in the city of Valencia at the height of the Campo de Carabobo, reaching the Distributor Guanapa in the city of Barinas.
- National Road Valencia – Maracay: It integrates the urban area to the north of the Lake of Valencia, Los Guayos, Guacara, San Joaquin and Mariara, until arriving at Maracay, in the State of Aragua. It receives the Local 001 identifier until Guacara, and from Guacara to Valencia is the Local 006.
- Morón – Coro road (Trunk 3) that goes from Morón and from there to Coro and Maracaibo along the coast.

The Trunk 11 that goes from Chivacoa, Cojedes State, passing by the Municipality of Miranda and Valencia, continuing along the south of Valencia Lake to Güigüe and from there to Villa de Cura, in Aragua State.

- Local Road 004: runs through the west of Carabobo and joins Urama with Bejuma.

=== Air transport ===
The State of Carabobo has two airports: one in the capital city of Carabobo (Valencia) and the other in Puerto Cabello.

The State of Carabobo is connected with other cities and states in the country and other countries through the Arturo Michelena International Airport, located in the heart of the industrial zone, southeast of the city of Valencia. It is the second airport in order of importance in the country. It is also the most important airport in the country in terms of the volume of goods transported, occupying 60% of the nation's air cargo. Each year it receives more than 150,000 passengers, in addition to being the boarding point for more than 160,000 national and international travelers.43 According to the IATA Airport Code corresponding to Arturo Michelena Airport, the acronym "VLN" is the identifying symbol of the city, both nationally and internationally. It was planned and built by the administration of Social Democratic President Jaime Lusinchi and Carabobo Governor Oscar Celli Gerbasi. The first plane to officially land at the Arturo Michelena terminal was a DC-9 from Aeropostal called "El Margariteño".

The General Bartolomé Salom Airport in the city of Puerto Cabello. It provides its services efficiently to the community. It has a single two-storey building of modern style, with a series of square windows that are repeated on the upper level and on the lower level with glass doors. It has a control tower, a waiting room, administrative offices, bullfighting facilities, restrooms, travelers' services area, parking lot and green areas. It has been providing services since 1953. It was extensively renovated by the Social Democratic president, Raúl Leoni, as part of the works carried out on the Carabobo coast, including the Valencia-Puerto Cabello road.

=== Valencia Metro ===
The State of Carabobo has the National Metro System in the capital city of the state (Valencia) called Metro de Valencia inaugurated in 2006. It currently has the following stations:

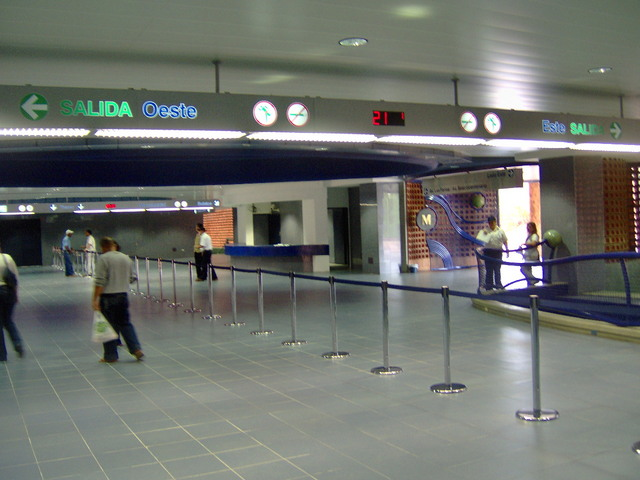
Monumental station, Valencia Metro

- Monumental station
- Las Ferias station
- Palotal station
- Santa Rosa station
- Michelena station
- Lara station
- Cedeño station
- Rafael Urdaneta station
- Francisco de Miranda station

The Valencia Metro is also being expanded with 5 new stations currently under construction. Metro de Valencia will have 2 intermodal stations for its interconnection with the National Railway System, in the Simón Bolívar station of the University of Carabobo (Naguanagua) and in the Castillito Industrial Zone (San Diego).

=== National Railway System ===
The railway section that will link the city of Valencia with Maracay and Caracas is currently under construction. The central section Ezequiel Zamora II (Puerto Cabello – La Encrucijada) of the National Railway System is the fundamental axis of the system, designed for passengers and cargo. It provides an interconnection between the state capital (Valencia) and the Eje Industrial Este, and in turn with Puerto Cabello. In this way, the Metropolitan Area of Valencia is consolidated and extended towards the most populated urban axes of the State; and the cohesion on a larger scale of all the urban areas of the Central Region. In Carabobo, the section has 6 stations: Puerto Cabello, Naguanagua, San Diego, Guacara, San Joaquin, Mariara and an interport in San Diego.

In addition, there is currently a freight train track with little traffic from the West (departing from Barquisimeto) to Puerto Cabello. This railroad and its stations are being rehabilitated as part of the Simon Bolivar West Central Section (Passengers and Cargo), from Puerto Cabello to San Felipe (Yaracuy), Barquisimeto (Lara), Acarigua and Turen (Portuguesa).

=== Surface Public Transport ===
Public transport is mostly composed of small buses and buses belonging to cooperatives or institutes attached to the municipalities. This public transport system is quite criticized due to the constant violations of traffic regulations and for not respecting the areas designated for the entry or discharge of passengers. Currently, the TransCarabobo Mass Transport System is in place with several routes throughout the city.

In order to find a solution to this problem, in conjunction with the completion of the second section of Line 1 of the Valencia Metro (Av. Bolivar Norte stage), there are plans to introduce a Metrobus45 system to complement the surface transport network by connecting various areas of the city with the Valencia metro stations.

=== TransCarabobo ===
The Carabobo Mass Transit System, or simply TransCarabobo, is a mass transit system in the State of Carabobo in Venezuela, especially in the cities of Valencia, Guacara, Puerto Cabello and Naguanagua. It is of the BRT type. It was inaugurated on 11 July 2014 in the hands of the Government of President Nicolas Maduro as part of the Transport Mission, it started operating the same day with two routes only in the city of Valencia. Later new routes were added in the cities of Guacara, Puerto Cabello and Naguanagua.

TransCarabobo has a central station located adjacent to the Parque Recreacional del Sur, where the unit and workshop yard is located and from where the two trunk lines depart. By April 2015 new routes will be activated in the municipalities of Carlos Arvelo, Los Guayos, Diego Ibarra and Libertador.

=== Interstate Public Transportation ===
Bus services to other cities are provided from the Big Low Center Passenger Terminal, located in the municipality of San Diego to the east of the city of Valencia. From this terminal all buses depart to the main cities of the country, such as Caracas, Maracaibo, Barquisimeto, Puerto Cabello, Maracay, Ciudad Bolívar, Maturín, Puerto La Cruz, Barcelona, Puerto Ordaz, Coro, Mérida, San Cristóbal, Punto Fijo, Tucacas, Chichiriviche, San Carlos, Los Teques, Barinas, San Juan de los Morros, Guanare, among others.

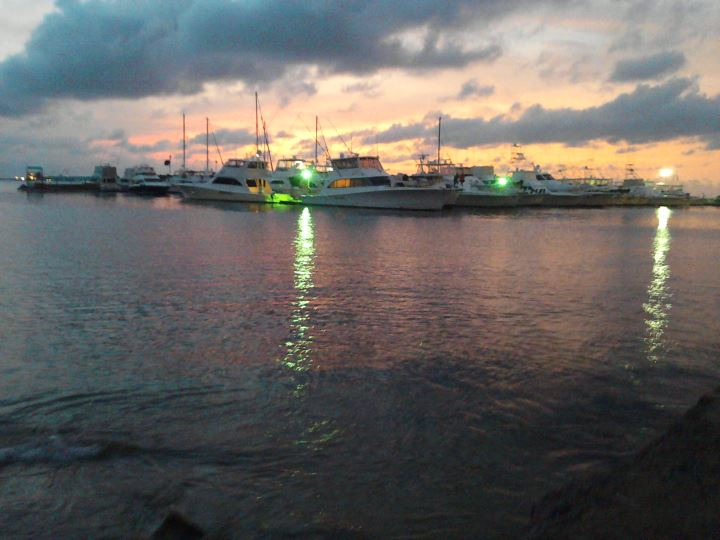
Puerto Cabello is one of the most important ports in Venezuela

At present, a new and modern land passenger terminal is being built, the Valencia Metropolitan Terminal, or also called San Diego Tourist Terminal, located in the Castillito Industrial Zone right in front of the current Big Low Center Terminal. This will be one of the largest and most moderate land passenger terminals in Venezuela, and will have hotel services, food fairs, and a shopping center, among other things.

=== Aquatic Transportation ===
The State of Carabobo has the largest and most important port in Venezuela, Puerto Cabello. Historically, it has been one of the most important since the colonial era, due to its location and natural characteristics, since the beginning of the 21st century, driven by the growing industrial development of the State of Carabobo.

Currently, Lake Valencia only has terminals and boats for private use.

== Tourism ==
- Valencia's historical centre and parks
- Valencia's Aquarium or Acuario de Valencia, which contains a large amount of endemic fish, as well as pink dolphins,

an insectarium and a small zoo with animals proper to Venezuela.

- Historic zone of Puerto Cabello
- Spanish fortress of Puerto Cabello (Solano Castle)
- Thermal baths and spa centre of Las Trincheras (described by Alexander von Humboldt)
- Indian petroglyphs in Vigirima
- Patanemo beach
- Mountains of Canoabo region in the western part of the state
- Colonial church of Los Guayos
- Colonial church of San Diego
- Abbey of St. Joseph, in Güigüe
- Campo Carabobo, Southwest of Valencia: a monument to the most important battle of independence

== Culture ==
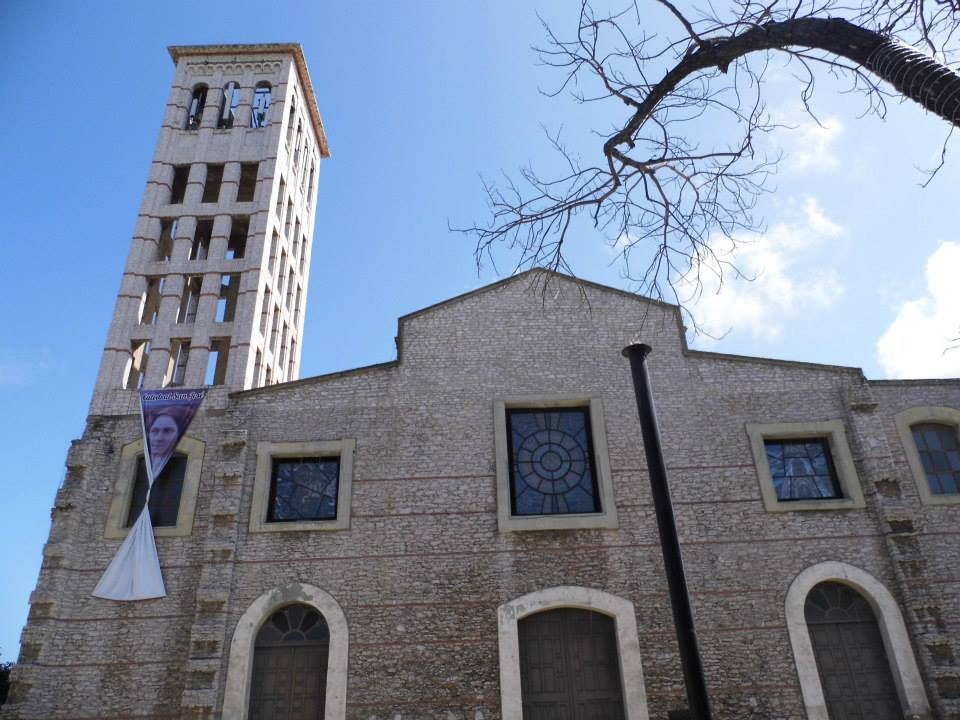
St. Joseph's Catholic Cathedral, Puerto Cabello

=== Folklore ===
Carabobo's folklore shows the influence of Native American, European and African components, as in most of Venezuela. The coastal regions have many traditions heavily influenced by African traditions. The mountain regions have rather European and Native American influences.

Drum-based music is very popular in the towns along the coast, from Morón to the Patanemo area. On 23 June, the feast of San Juan Bautista (Saint John the Baptist), the patron of these towns, is celebrated with drummer groups beating their instruments. The village of Borburata is specially known for its festivities.

The town of Yagua has a Festivity of the Flowers (Fiesta de las Flores) starting with a procession to the nearby mountain, with a parade where the most different flower motives are shown through the village and the usual town celebrations.

=== Food ===
Carabobo's cuisine shares many components with other Venezuelan regions, like Cachapas, Arepas and Hallacas. Local specialities include:

- Maize chicha
- Fried fish with tostones (fried salty plantain) with rice and salad, specially served on the coast
- Orange and lemon cakes
- Panelas de San Joaquín produced in San Joaquín, a kind of bizcochito

=== Theatres and Auditoriums ===
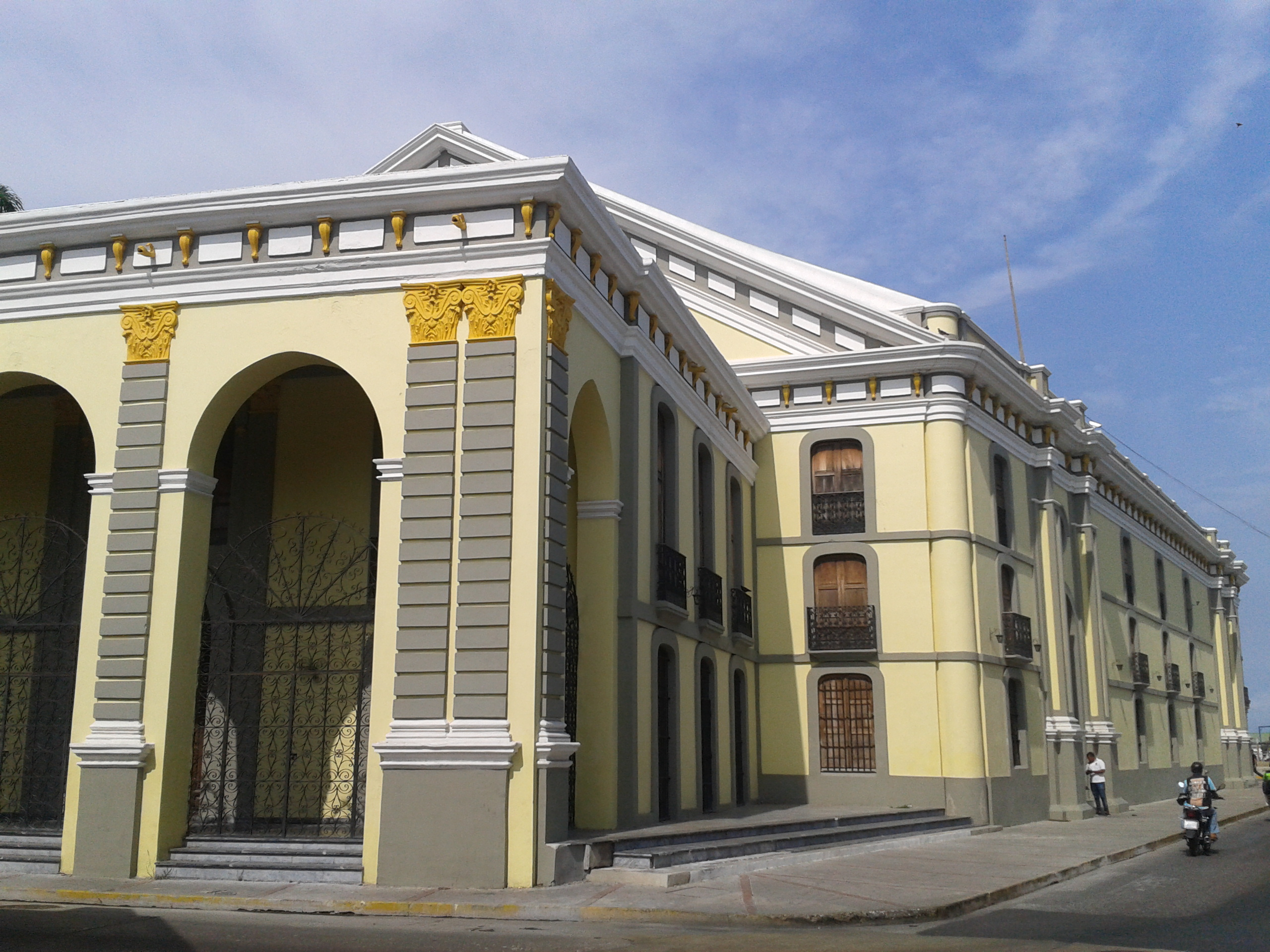
Puerto Cabello Municipal Theater

- Municipal Theatre of Valencia: Public Municipal Theatre of the city. It is one of the most representative buildings of the republican period in Venezuela. It has a capacity of 647 seats. It is a replica of the Paris Opera House, designed by the architect Antonio Malaussena. It is located at the intersection of Colombia Street and Carabobo Street since 1892, when the building was completed. It is considered a National Historic Monument since 1964.
- Teatro Estable Valencia: Located in the National Baseball Museum in the Sambil Valencia Shopping Center, it was created in 2010 with the aim of reviving the traditional theatre and offering a permanent billboard with theatrical shows with both local and national talent.37
- Teatro Dr. Alfredo Celis Pérez: (known as the old Anfiteatro de Bárbula), was inaugurated on 9 December 1951 in the Ciudad Universitaria Bárbula of the University of Carabobo. Remodeled and re-inaugurated on 25 May 1996, it is currently the venue for multiple presentations of different musical, theatrical and acting disciplines by both national and international artists; as well as a venue for conferences, university degree events, etc.
- Hesperia Convention Center (WTC): is the largest convention center in the country, located within the World Trade Center Valencia complex, (Hesperia Rio Hotel), north of the city.
- Aula Magna of the University of Carabobo is a cultural complex that is still in the final phase of construction. It will become the largest and most important cultural and events university complex in the State of Carabobo and the second in Venezuela after the Aula Magna of the UCV in Caracas. It has a Main Hall, several Stages, Workshops, Chamber and Drama Hall and Multipurpose Rooms.
- UAM Auditorium: auditorium inside the Arturo Michelena University, in the San Diego Municipality, east of the city. This auditorium serves as a venue for conferences, university degree events, among others.
- UJAP Auditorium: It is an auditorium inside the Universidad José Antonio Páez, in the Municipality of San Diego, to the east of the city. This auditorium serves as a venue for conferences, university events, among others.
- Isla Multiespacio Private Theater: It is a private theater within the Isla Multiespacio Complex, in the Municipality of San Diego to the east of the city. It is still under construction.

=== Museums and Cultural Centers ===
Among the most important are:

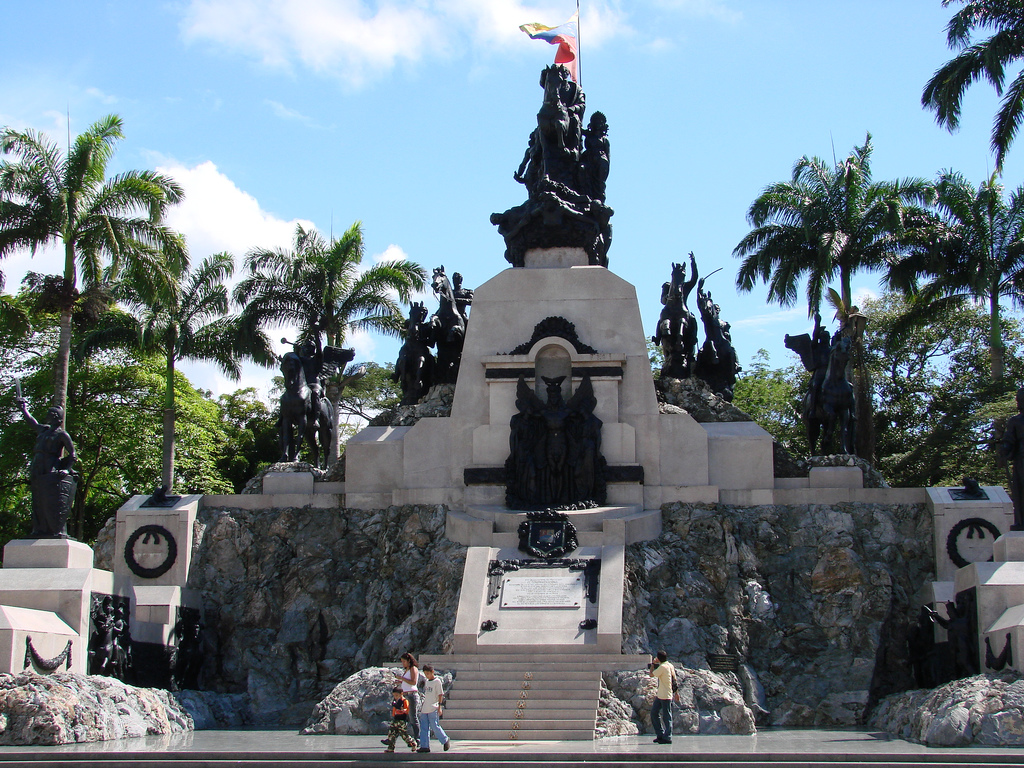
Altar de la Patria, Campo de Carabobo

- Ateneo de Valencia: this institution presents exhibitions of paintings and sculptures, plays and other cultural events.
- Culture Museum: it is located in the Paseo Cabriales Avenue, in the historical centre of the city of Valencia. It is a modern building in the shape of a cross whose spaces are connected by a central element that allows vertical circulation in the facilities.
- Casa de la Estrella Museum: it is located in the old building that was the San Antonio de Padua Hospital in the Central Area of Valencia. It was the seat of the presidency of the Republic on two occasions, the first being in 1830 when Congress decided to separate Venezuela from the Great Colombia. Today it is an important museum that shows the characteristics of the old colonial building, its changes through history, and important objects related to its function as presidential seat. It also hosts occasional exhibitions and cultural events. It was declared a National Historic Monument in 1980.
- Museo Casa Páez: is located in the central area of Valencia, in the center of the city, at the intersection of Avenida Boyacá and Calle Páez. Although the origins of the building are not clearly known, it was the residence of General José Antonio Páez since 1830, when he began to exercise from it the presidency of the nation. In the house worked the Police of Valencia (using the basements as dungeons), the Library of the Carabobo State, the School of Law "Miguel José Sanz", the School of "Fine Arts, Ballet and Music" and the Military District. It is the headquarters of the Paez Museum since 1910, created in commemoration of the centenary of the events of the Revolution of 19 April 1810. It was declared a National Historical Monument in 1965 by then president of Venezuela Raúl Leoni.
- Quinta La Isabela (old Iturriza Palace): located in Avenida Miranda in Valencia. It is known as Quinta La Isabela, and dates back to 1877, when it was built. It was designed by the architect Francisco Fernández Paz for Don Juan Manuel Iturriza, its first owner. It has housed the city's museum since 1999, and was declared a National Historic Monument in 1981.

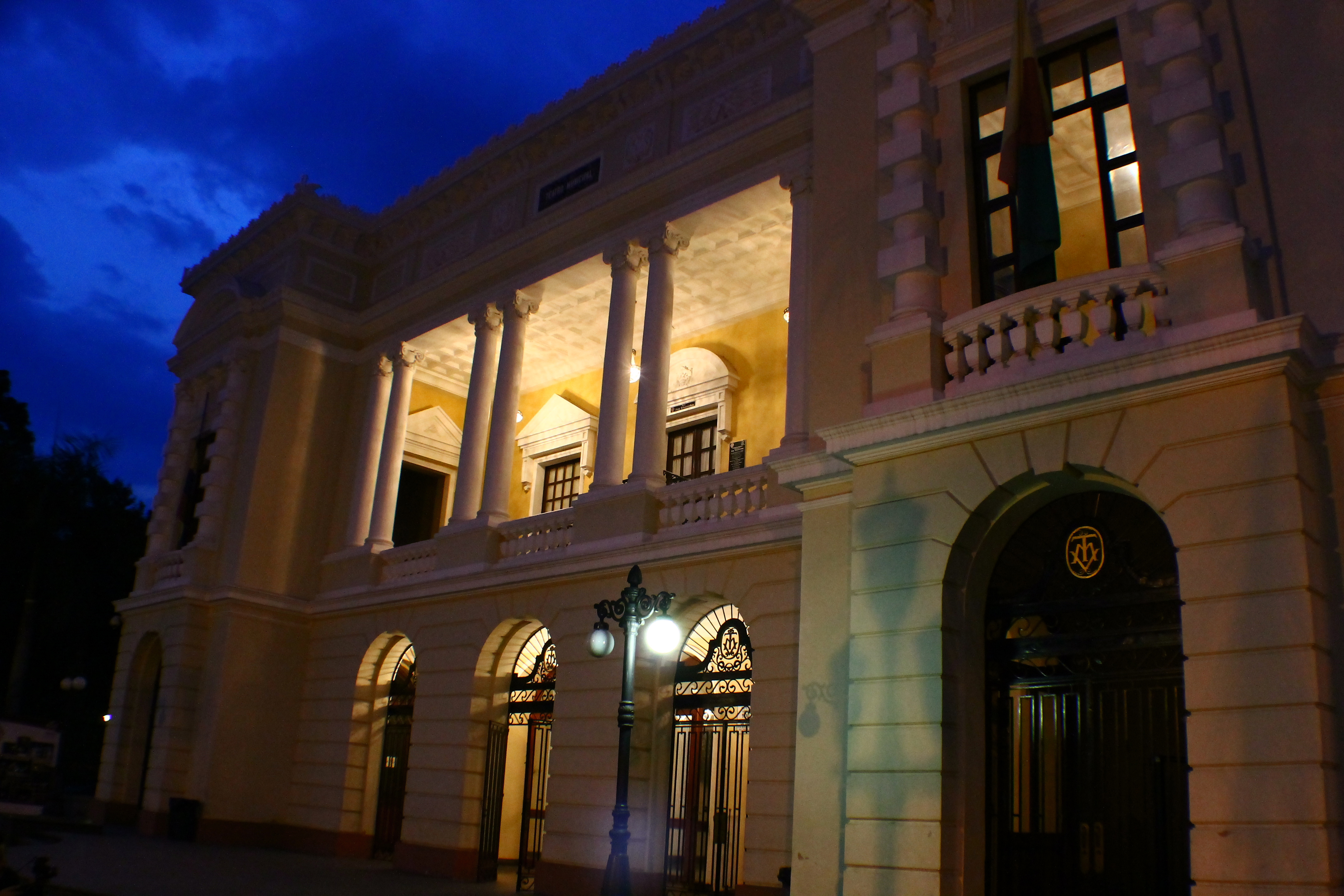
Municipal Theatre of Valencia

- Hall of Fame and National Baseball Museum: located in the Sambil Valencia Shopping Center in the municipality of Naguanagua. It is a museum aimed at divulging the history of Venezuelan baseball and exalting the figures who have contributed to the glory of this sport inside and outside of Venezuela, through a permanent exhibition of objects, clothing and implements typical of this sport. The museum also offers interactive activities in the Pelota Evaluation Center, where visitors can pitch, bat and run to acquire skills typical of baseball players.
- Casa de los Celis Museum: headquarters of the Carabobo State Anthropology and History Institute since 1964. It previously belonged to the Celis, a wealthy family in the region and is one of the largest colonial houses in Valencia, located between Avenida Soublette and Calle Comercio. It has an important collection of colonial and indigenous art, as well as fossil remains mostly found in the vicinity of Lake Valencia, and was declared a National Historic Monument in 1964 by the then president of Venezuela, Raúl Leoni.
- Braulio Salazar University Art Gallery: located in Plaza Prebo, north of the city of Valencia, since 1980. It has two permanent exhibition rooms, a multipurpose audiovisual room, a library, a Centre for Research and Documentation of the Arts and administrative areas. The National Salon of the Arts of Fire, the most important in the country in this speciality, is held here every year. It is administered by the University of Carabobo.
- Arturo Michelena Museum: it is an art museum located in the central area of Valencia.

== Media ==
=== Newspapers ===
The main newspapers of the region are El Carabobeño and Notitarde. other newspapers published in the region include:

- Notitarde La Costa (newspaper of the area of Puerto Cabello, Juan José Mora and coastal areas of Falcón State.
- Newspaper El Periódico
- ACN – Carabobbean News Agency
- El Expreso de Carabobo
- Diario la Costa (published on the coasts of Carabobo State and Falcon State)
- Newspaper Ciudad Valencia (Ciudad VLC)
- Carabobo Sport Magazine
- Tiempo Universitario (newspaper of the University of Carabobo)

=== Regional TV ===
The main channels of the region re NCtv and DATtv

- Niños Cantores Televisión (belonging to the Archbishopric of Valencia)
- RED Televisión (belonging to the Arturo Michelena University).
- Televisora de la Costa (TVC).
- Televisora Independiente del Centro (TIC).
- Televisora Regional Venezolano.

== Sports ==
Among the most followed sports in the State of Carabobo are baseball, soccer and basketball, with the first sport having the most local fans and the second one having the most practitioners of all ages.

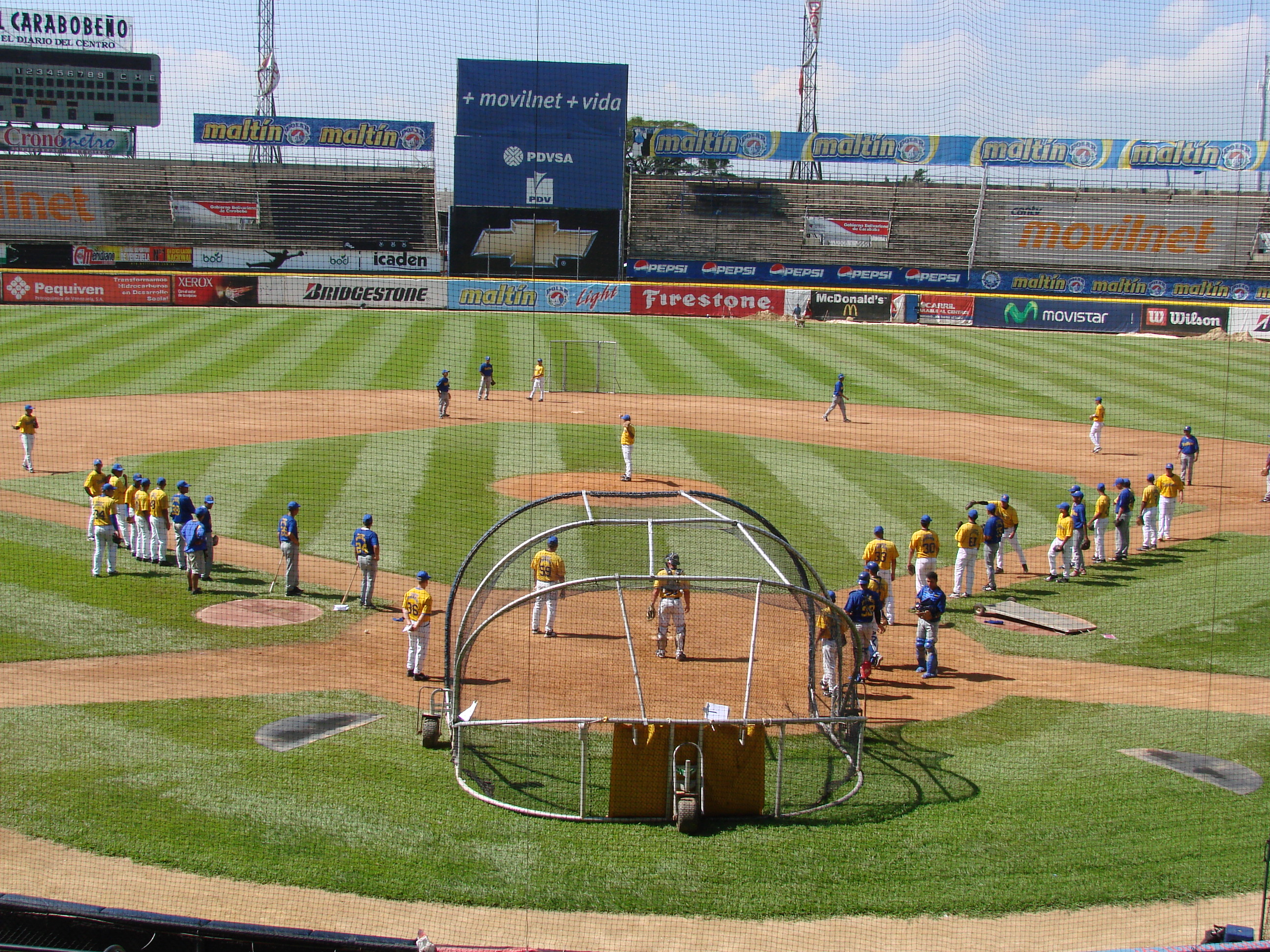
José Bernardo Pérez Stadium in Valencia

In terms of competition, the city is also one of the cities with the greatest representation of athletes in national level competitions, leaving the State of Carabobo as 10 times champion of the Venezuelan National Games, of which 9 have been consecutively.

The local professional baseball team, Los Navegantes del Magallanes. Originally the team was founded under the name "Magallanes de Catia" in the city of Caracas, and later became the local flagship team. It is consecrated as the oldest sports institution in Venezuela.

In soccer the capital of the state, has four (4) teams registered in the different tournaments organized by the Venezuelan Federation of Soccer, among which are the Carabobo Soccer Club and the Academia Puerto Cabello both of the First Division of Venezuela, the CIV Valencia and the Valencia Sport Club of the Second Division "B".

In basketball, it has the team of the Venezuelan Professional Basketball League, representatives of the State of Carabobo, the Carabobo Globetrotters.

=== Sports Complexes ===
- Forum de Valencia: main multipurpose sports complex in the State of Carabobo and the Central Region of Venezuela, used mainly for basketball games, presentation of various shows and events of all kinds. It is home to the team of the Venezuelan Professional Basketball League, the Carabobo Globetrotters. It has a capacity for 14,000 spectators. It is also home to the Volleyball team, Club Voleibol Industriales de Valencia, one of the 6 founding teams of the Venezuelan Volleyball Super League in 2011. It is the second event center in Venezuela after Poliedro de Caracas.
- José Bernardo Pérez Stadium: This is a sports infrastructure where baseball is practiced. It is the home of one of the most important teams and with one of the biggest fans in the country of the Venezuelan Professional Baseball League, representatives of the Carabobo State, the Navegantes del Magallanes. It has a capacity for 16,000 spectators.
- Misael Delgado Stadium: This is a multipurpose sports complex that, in spite of being a relatively small infrastructure, is used for various sports, among which soccer stands out. The stadium, which houses the Carabobo State representative of the Venezuelan First Division, Carabobo Soccer Club, has a capacity of approximately 12,000 spectators. It also has an Olympic swimming pool where swimming is practiced affiliated to Club Natación de Carabobo ('CNC') being the headquarters of the swimming team Delfines de Carabobo, in addition to other disciplines.
- Plaza de toros Monumental de Valencia: an important Venezuelan bullring, it has a capacity of more than 25,000 people, very similar to Las Ventas and only below the Plaza de Toros Mexico. In this sense, it is the second largest in terms of capacity in the world. Besides serving for bullfights, it works as a stage for musical bands and other shows.
- Valencia Hippodrome: a sports complex, where horse riding is practised, located to the south of the city, just behind the Monumental Bullring of Valencia.
- Velodrome Máximo Romero: it is a velodrome located in the south of the city. Cycling and athletics are practiced there.
- Carabobo Olympic Village: complex, located in the north of the city, where they pay tribute to sport and all the outstanding athletes of the State of Carabobo.
- Skatepark de San Diego: catalogued as the largest in Latin America, it is one of the few parks in Venezuela dedicated to the practice of this extreme sport (skateboarding), in a place specifically designed for it. It is a bowl type skatepark, also composed of a series of obstacles (planes, curves, stairs, etc.) made on a special rolling surface for the practice of the different sports that can be performed there, there are also green areas directed as public use spaces. It is located in the San Diego Municipality of the city.
- University of Carabobo Sports Complex: (also known as Bárbula Sports Complex), is the largest and most complete university sports complex in the State. It is located within the University of Carabobo's Ciudad Universitaria Bárbula, where sports such as soccer, baseball, basketball, athletics, swimming, and volleyball, among others, are practiced.

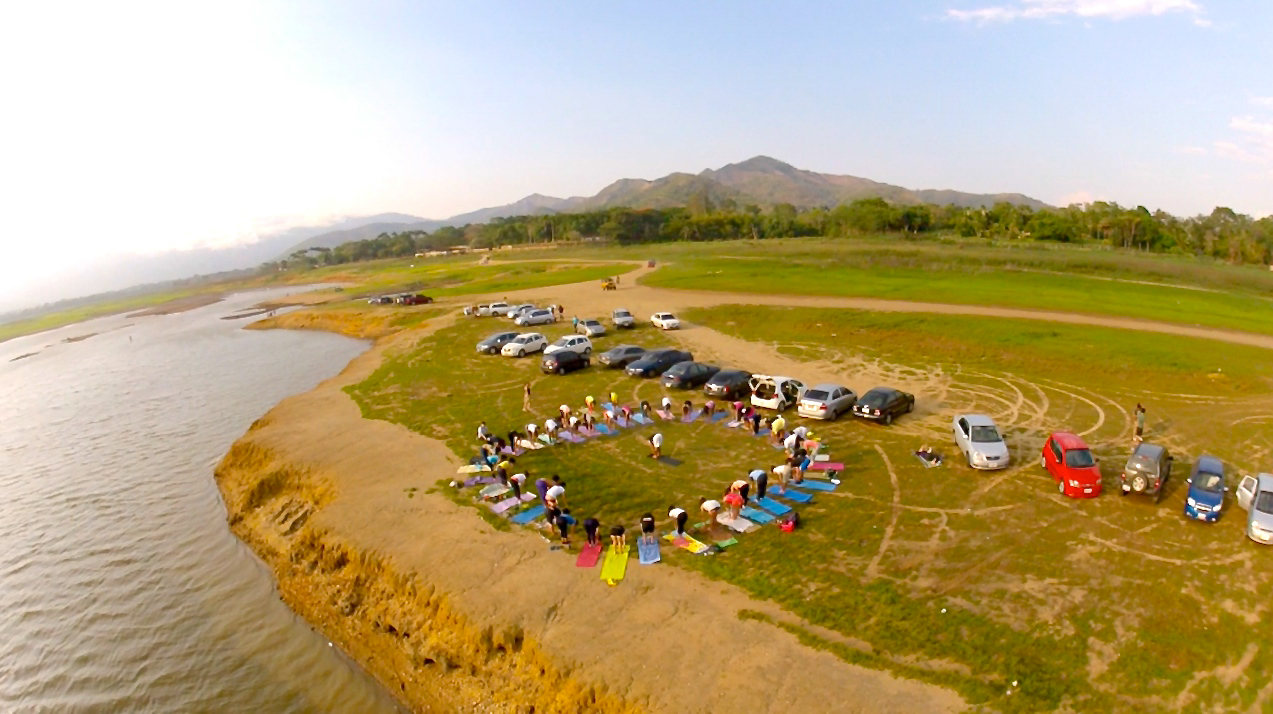
Guataparo Dam

- Simon Bolivar Sports Complex: (also known as Bicentennial Sports Complex), is located south of the Municipality of Naguanagua (north of Valencia), is the second largest sports complex in the state. It has tennis courts, a paintball area, volleyball courts, and a gymnasium, among others.
- Guataparo Dam: a tourist attraction area for water sports where sailing, speedboats, water skiing, diving and sport fishing are practiced.
- Colegio de Cintas Negras: it is a sports institution where they practice Karate, Taekwondo, Judo and Hapkido. Founded in 1996, as part of the strategic program between Japan and South Korea.

== Notable citizens ==
- Fernando Penalver – President of the Venezuelan Congress of 1812 and first governor of the Province created in 1824
- Miguel Peña – Intellectual leader and parliamentarian. One of the founding fathers of Venezuela
- Juan Jose Flores (General), after Independence, became the first President of the Republic of Ecuador
- Bartolomé Salom (General), fought alongside Bolivar for the Independence of Peru,
- Carlos Arvelo Guevara, doctor and politician.
- Antonio Herrera Toro, painter.
- Braulio Salazar, painter.
- Arturo Michelena, painter.

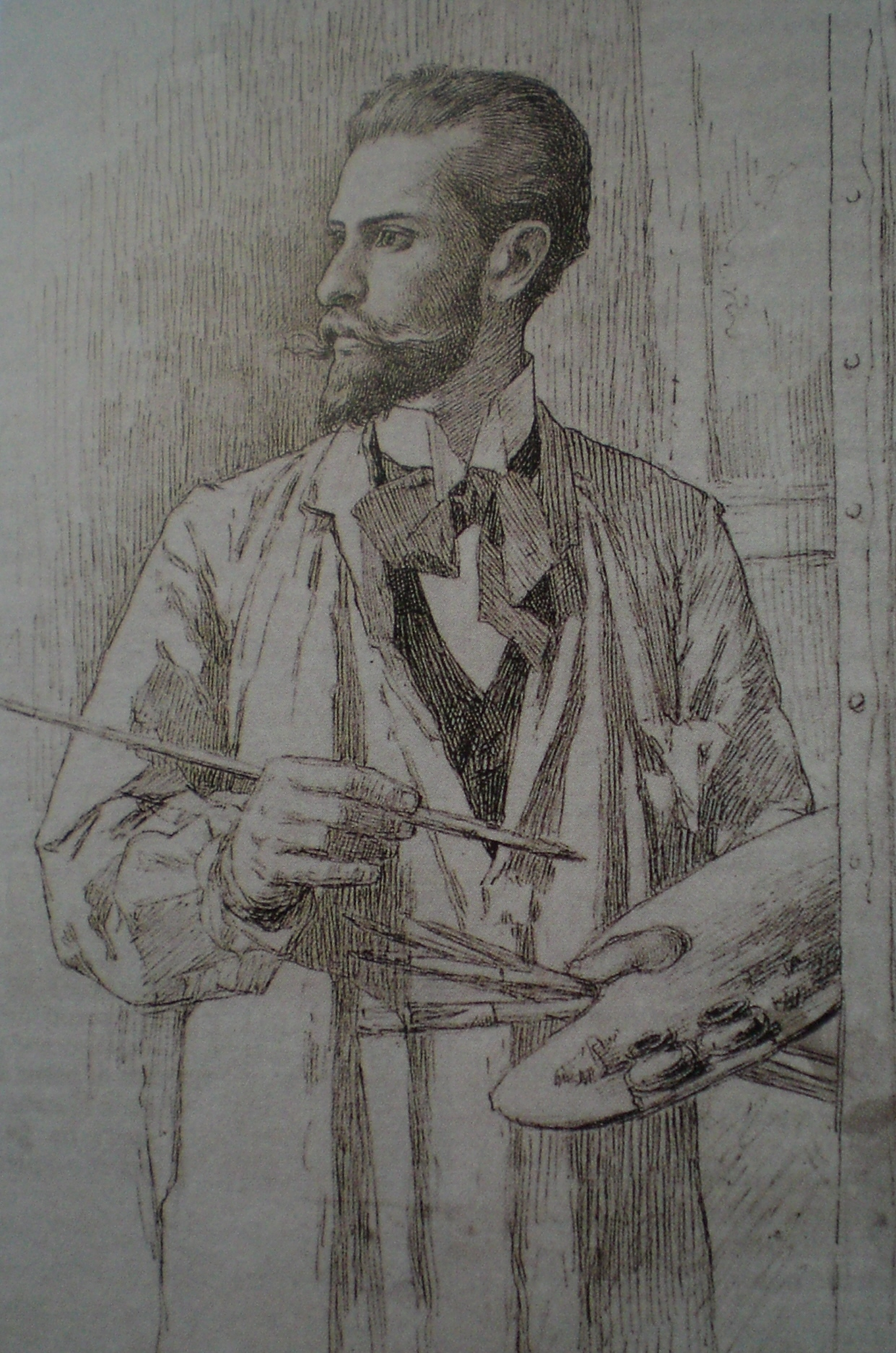
Arturo Michelena, self-portrait

- Aldemaro Romero, musician
- Óscar Celli Gerbasi, politician, Governor of Carabobo (1985–1989)
- Vicente Gerbasi, poet.
- Renny Ottolina, TV celebrity.
- Eugenio Montejo, poet (born in Caracas, but studied and lived specially in Valencia)
- Guillermo Tell Villegas, interim president of Venezuela.
- Hermógenes López, interim president of Venezuela.
- Robert Machado, MLB player for the Chicago White Sox, Montreal Expos, Seattle Mariners, Chicago Cubs, Milwaukee Brewers, and the Baltimore Orioles.
- Rubén Quevedo, MLB player for the Chicago Cubs and Milwaukee Brewers.
- Pablo Sandoval, MLB player for the San Francisco Giants.
- Henderson Álvarez, MLB player for the Miami Marlins.
- Roberto Maytín, tennis player
- Jacqueline Aguilera, Miss Venezuela World 1995, Miss World 1995.
- Salvador Pérez, MLB player for the Kansas City Royals, and MVP in the 2015 World Series.
- Willson Contreras, MLB player for the Chicago Cubs

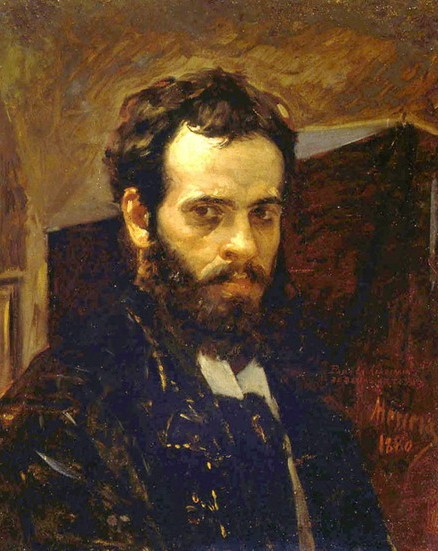
Antonio Herrera Toro Self-Portrait of 1880

- César Hernández, MLB player for the Philadelphia Phillies jersey #16 plays 2B
- Andrés Blanco, MLB player for the Philadelphia Phillies
- Jose Altuve, MLB player for the Houston Astros wears jersey #27, plays 2B, is one of the shortest players in the major leagues and one of the shortest players to ever play pro baseball, listed at 5'6"
- David Peralta, MLB player for the Arizona Diamondbacks, he wears jersey #6 and plays RF
- Félix Hernández, MLB pitcher for the Seattle Mariners, he is one of the top pitchers in MLB and a future Hall of Fame member.
- Gabriela Isler, Miss Venezuela 2012, Miss Universe 2013
- Grecia Colmenares, International Actress
- Coraima Torres, International Actress
- Martina Thorogood, Miss Venezuela 1999
- Carolina Indriago, Miss Venezuela 1998
- Marena Bencomo, Miss Venezuela 1996
- Ly Jonaitis, Miss Venezuela 2006
- Thalía Olvino, Miss Venezuela 2019

== See also ==
- Venezuela Department (1824)
- Carabobo Province
