= San Joaquín, Carabobo =

San Joaquín
- town
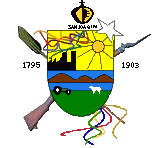
- Coat of arms

- Location within Venezuela
- Coordinates: 10°15′45″N 67°47′32″W
- Country: Venezuela
- State: Carabobo

Area
  - Total: 127 km^{2} (49 sq mi)

Population (2011)
  - Total: 62,777
- Time zone: UTC−4 (VET)

San Joaquín is a city located in San Joaquín Municipality, Carabobo State, Venezuela.

In 2001, the city's population was 47,920.

The town is well known for its local biscuits, the "panelas of San Joaquín".
