= San Joaquín Municipality, Carabobo =

San Joaquín Municipality Municipio San Joaquín
- Municipality
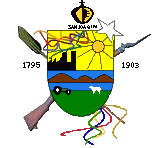
- Flag Coat of arms

- Location in Carabobo

- Location in Venezuela
- Coordinates: 10°16′41″N 67°47′38″W
- Country: Venezuela
- State: Carabobo
- Municipal seat: San Joaquín

Government
  - Mayor: Diego Corrales Rivero (PSUV)

Area
  - Total: 189.9 km^{2} (73.3 sq mi)

Population (2011)
  - Total: 64,124
  - Density: 337.7/km^{2} (874.6/sq mi)
- Time zone: UTC−4 (VET)
- Area code(s): 0245

The San Joaquín Municipality is one of the 14 municipalities (municipios) that makes up the Venezuelan state of Carabobo and, according to the 2011 census by the National Institute of Statistics of Venezuela, the municipality has a population of 64,124. The town of San Joaquín is the municipal seat of the San Joaquín Municipality.

== Geography ==
It borders Aragua State to the north, the Lake Valencia to the south, the Diego Ibarra Municipality to the east, and the Guacara Municipality to the west.

== Demographics ==
The San Joaquín Municipality, according to a 2007 population estimate by the National Institute of Statistics of Venezuela, has a population of 60,953 (up from 48,946 in 2000). This amounts to 2.7% of the state's population. The municipality's population density is 479.94 inhabitants per square kilometre (1,243.0/sq mi).

== Government ==
The mayor of the San Joaquín Municipality is Luis Aguiar, elected on November 23, 2008, with 55% of the vote. He replaced César Emilio Hernández Meza shortly after the elections. The municipality is divided into one parish (San Joaquín).

== Tradition ==
The municipality is well known for its local biscuits, the "panelas of San Joaquín".

== See also ==
- San Joaquín
- Carabobo
- Municipalities of Venezuela
