= List of Cincinnati Reds minor league affiliates =

Current Cincinnati Reds domestic minor league affiliate locations

The Cincinnati Reds farm system consists of seven Minor League Baseball affiliates across the United States and in the Dominican Republic. Four teams are independently owned, while the Arizona Complex League Reds, Dominican Summer League Reds, and Dominican Summer League Rojos are owned by the major league club.

The Reds have been affiliated with the Triple-A Louisville Bats of the International League since 2000, making it the longest-running active affiliation in the organization among teams not owned by the Reds. The longest affiliation in franchise history was with the Billings Mustangs, who were the team's Rookie affiliate in the Pioneer League for 47 seasons from 1974 to 2020. Their newest affiliate is the Chattanooga Lookouts of the Southern League, which became the Reds' Double-A club in 2019; they were previously affiliated with Chattanooga from 1988 to 2008.

Geographically, Cincinnati's closest domestic affiliate is the High-A Dayton Dragons of the Midwest League, which are approximately 49 miles (79 km) away. Cincinnati's furthest domestic affiliate is the Arizona Complex League Reds of the Rookie Arizona Complex League, which are some 1,595 miles (2,567 km) away.

== Current affiliates ==
The Cincinnati Reds farm system consists of seven minor league affiliates.

Class	Team	League	Location	Ballpark	Affiliated
Triple-A	Louisville Bats	International League	Louisville, Kentucky	Louisville Slugger Field	2000
Double-A	Chattanooga Lookouts	Southern League	Chattanooga, Tennessee	Erlanger Park	2019
High-A	Dayton Dragons	Midwest League	Dayton, Ohio	Day Air Ballpark	2000
Single-A	Daytona Tortugas	Florida State League	Daytona Beach, Florida	Jackie Robinson Ballpark	2015
Rookie	ACL Reds	Arizona Complex League	Goodyear, Arizona	Goodyear Ballpark	1999
Rookie	DSL Reds	Dominican Summer League	Boca Chica, Santo Domingo	Baseball City Complex	1998
Rookie	DSL Rojos	Dominican Summer League	Boca Chica, Santo Domingo	Baseball City Complex	2024

== Past affiliates ==
=== Key ===
Season	Each year is linked to an article about that particular Reds season.

=== 1932–1962 ===
Minor League Baseball operated with five classes (Double-A, Class A, Class B, Class C, and Class D) from 1932 to 1935. Class A1, between Double-A and Class A, was added in 1936. The minors continued to operate with these six levels through 1945. Triple-A was established as the highest classification in 1946, and Class A1 became Double-A, with Class A through D remaining. These six levels continued through 1962. The Pacific Coast League (PCL) was reclassified from Triple-A to Open in 1952 due to the possibility of becoming a third major league. This arrangement ended following the 1957 season when the relocation of the National League's Dodgers and Giants to the West Coast ended any chance of the PCL being promoted.

Season	Triple-A	Double-A	Class A	Class B	Class C	Class D	Ref.
1932	—	—	—	—	—	Cedar Rapids Bunnies	
1933	—	—	Topeka Senators	Rock Island Islanders	—	—	
1934	—	Toronto Maple Leafs	Topeka Senators	Wilmington Pirates	Bartlesville Reds; Beckley Black Knights	Jeannette Reds	
1935	—	Toronto Maple Leafs	—	Wilmington Pirates	Bartlesville Reds	Lake Charles Skippers; Monessen Reds	
1936	—	Toronto Maple Leafs	Nashville Volunteers (A1)	Durham Bulls; Macon Peaches	El Dorado Lions	Cordele Reds; DeLand Reds; Fremont Reds; Lincoln Red Links; Paducah Indians	
1937	—	Syracuse Chiefs	Nashville Volunteers (A1)	Durham Bulls; Peoria Reds	El Dorado Lions; Muskogee Reds	Cordele Reds; DeLand Reds; Fremont Reds	
1938	—	Syracuse Chiefs	Albany Senators	Columbia Reds; Durham Bulls; Waterloo Red Hawks	El Dorado Lions; Muskogee Reds	Rogers Reds; Union City Greyhounds	
1939	—	Indianapolis Indians	Albany Senators	Columbia Reds; Durham Bulls; Waterloo Red Hawks	El Dorado Lions; Erie Sailors; Helena Seaporters; Muskogee Reds; Ogden Reds	Bassett Furnituremakers; Grand Forks Chiefs	
1940	—	Indianapolis Indians	Birmingham Barons (A1)	Columbia Reds	Ogden Reds; Tucson Cowboys	Lenoir Reds; Troy Trojans	
1941	—	Indianapolis Indians	Birmingham Barons (A1)	Columbia Reds	Ogden Reds; Riverside Reds; Tucson Cowboys	Cordele Reds; Wichita Falls Spudders	
1942	—	Syracuse Chiefs	Birmingham Barons (A1)	Columbia Reds	Ogden Reds	Cordele Reds	
1943	—	Syracuse Chiefs	Birmingham Barons (A1)	—	—	—	
1944	—	Syracuse Chiefs	Birmingham Barons (A1)	—	—	—	
1945	—	Syracuse Chiefs	—	—	Raleigh Capitals	Lima Reds	
1946	Syracuse Chiefs	—	Columbia Reds	—	Ogden Reds	Middletown Rockets	
1947	Syracuse Chiefs	—	Columbia Reds	Providence Chiefs	Ogden Reds; Rockford Rox; Tyler Trojans	Lockport Reds; Muncie Reds	
1948	Syracuse Chiefs	Tulsa Oilers	Columbia Reds	Sunbury Reds	Ogden Reds; Rockford Rox; Tyler Trojans	Ballinger Cats; Lockport Reds; Muncie Reds	
1949	Syracuse Chiefs	Tulsa Oilers	Charleston Senators; Columbia Reds	Sunbury Reds	Ogden Reds; Rockford Rox; Tyler Trojans	Lockport Reds; Muncie Reds	
1950	Syracuse Chiefs	Tulsa Oilers	Charleston Senators; Columbia Reds	Decatur Commodores	Ogden Reds	Lockport Reds; Muncie Reds; Wilmington Pirates	
1951	—	Tulsa Oilers	Charleston Senators; Columbia Reds	—	Ogden Reds	Welch Miners	
1952	—	Tulsa Oilers	Columbia Reds	Burlington Flints; Salisbury Reds	Ogden Reds	Dublin Green Sox; Lawton Reds; Mattoon Indians	
1953	—	Tulsa Oilers	Columbia Reds	Burlington Flints	Ogden Reds	Fitzgerald Pioneers; Jackson Generals; Lawton Reds	
1954	—	Tulsa Oilers	Columbia Reds	Colonial Heights-Petersburg Colts; High Point-Thomasville Hi-Toms	Duluth Dukes; Maryville-Alcoa Twins/Morristown Reds; Ogden Reds	Douglas Trojans; Fitzgerald Redlegs; Fort Walton Beach Jets	
1955	Havana Sugar Kings	Nashville Volunteers	Columbia Reds	High Point-Thomasville Hi-Toms; Sunbury Redlegs	Duluth Dukes; Ogden Reds	Douglas Trojans; Moultrie Reds; Fort Walton Beach Jets	
1956	Havana Sugar Kings; Seattle Rainiers (Open)	Nashville Volunteers	Savannah Redlegs	Clovis Pioneers; High Point-Thomasville Hi-Toms	Wausau Lumberjacks; Yuma Sun Sox	Douglas Reds; Moultrie Reds; West Palm Beach Sun Chiefs	
1957	Havana Sugar Kings; Seattle Rainiers (Open)	Nashville Volunteers	Savannah Redlegs	Clovis Redlegs; Port Arthur Redlegs / Temple Redlegs; Wenatchee Chiefs	Visalia Redlegs; Wausau Lumberjacks	Bradford Beagles / Hornell Redlegs; Graceville Oilers; Palatka Redlegs	
1958	Havana Sugar Kings; Seattle Rainiers	Nashville Volunteers	Albuquerque Dukes; Savannah Redlegs	Wenatchee Chiefs	Visalia Redlegs	Geneva Redlegs; Graceville Oilers; Palatka Redlegs	
1959	Havana Sugar Kings; Seattle Rainiers	Nashville Volunteers	Savannah Reds	Topeka Hawks	Visalia Redlegs	Geneva Redlegs; Palatka Redlegs	
1960	Havana Sugar Kings / Jersey City Jerseys; Seattle Rainiers	Nashville Volunteers	Columbia Reds	Topeka Reds	Missoula Timberjacks	Geneva Redlegs; Palatka Redlegs	
1961	Indianapolis Indians; Jersey City Jerseys	—	Columbia Reds	Topeka Reds	—	Geneva Redlegs; Tampa Tarpons	
1962	San Diego Padres	—	Macon Peaches	Rocky Mount Leafs	—	Geneva Redlegs; Tampa Tarpons	

=== 1963–1989 ===
Prior to the 1963 season, Major League Baseball (MLB) initiated a reorganization of Minor League Baseball that resulted in a reduction from six classes to four (Triple-A, Double-A, Class A, and Rookie) in response to the general decline of the minors throughout the 1950s and early-1960s when leagues and teams folded due to shrinking attendance caused by baseball fans' preference for staying at home to watch MLB games on television. The only change made within the next 27 years was Class A being subdivided for the first time to form Class A Short Season in 1966.

Season	Triple-A	Double-A	Class A	Class A Short Season	Rookie	Ref.
1963	San Diego Padres	Macon Peaches	Cedar Rapids Red Raiders; Rocky Mount Leafs; Tampa Tarpons	—	—	
1964	San Diego Padres	Macon Peaches	Cedar Rapids Red Raiders; Peninsula Grays; Tampa Tarpons	—	—	
1965	San Diego Padres	Knoxville Smokies	Peninsula Grays; Tampa Tarpons	—	—	
1966	Buffalo Bisons	Knoxville Smokies	Peninsula Grays; Tampa Tarpons	Sioux Falls Packers	—	
1967	Buffalo Bisons	Knoxville Smokies	Tampa Tarpons	Sioux Falls Packers	Wytheville Reds	
1968	Indianapolis Indians	Asheville Tourists	Tampa Tarpons	Sioux Falls Packers	GCL Reds	
1969	Indianapolis Indians	Asheville Tourists	Tampa Tarpons	Sioux Falls Packers	GCL Reds	
1970	Indianapolis Indians	Asheville Tourists	Tampa Tarpons	Sioux Falls Packers	GCL Reds	
1971	Indianapolis Indians	Trois-Rivières Aigles	Tampa Tarpons	Sioux Falls Packers	GCL Reds	
1972	Indianapolis Indians	Trois-Rivières Aigles	Tampa Tarpons	—	Melbourne Reds; GCL Reds	
1973	Indianapolis Indians	Trois-Rivières Aigles	Tampa Tarpons	Seattle Rainiers	GCL Reds	
1974	Indianapolis Indians	Trois-Rivières Aigles	Tampa Tarpons	Seattle Rainiers	Billings Mustangs	
1975	Indianapolis Indians	Trois-Rivières Aigles	Tampa Tarpons	Eugene Emeralds	Billings Mustangs	
1976	Indianapolis Indians	Trois-Rivières Aigles	Tampa Tarpons	Eugene Emeralds	Billings Mustangs	
1977	Indianapolis Indians	Trois-Rivières Aigles	Shelby Reds; Tampa Tarpons	Eugene Emeralds	Billings Mustangs	
1978	Indianapolis Indians	Nashville Sounds	Shelby Reds; Tampa Tarpons	Eugene Emeralds	Billings Mustangs	
1979	Indianapolis Indians	Nashville Sounds	Greensboro Hornets; Tampa Tarpons	Eugene Emeralds	Billings Mustangs	
1980	Indianapolis Indians	Waterbury Reds	Cedar Rapids Reds; Tampa Tarpons	Eugene Emeralds	Billings Mustangs	
1981	Indianapolis Indians	Waterbury Reds	Cedar Rapids Reds; Tampa Tarpons	Eugene Emeralds	Billings Mustangs	
1982	Indianapolis Indians	Waterbury Reds	Cedar Rapids Reds; Tampa Tarpons	Eugene Emeralds	Billings Mustangs	
1983	Indianapolis Indians	Waterbury Reds	Cedar Rapids Reds; Tampa Tarpons	Eugene Emeralds	Billings Mustangs	
1984	Wichita Aeros	Vermont Reds	Cedar Rapids Reds; Tampa Tarpons	—	Billings Mustangs; GCL Reds	
1985	Denver Zephyrs	Vermont Reds	Cedar Rapids Reds; Tampa Tarpons	—	Billings Mustangs; GCL Reds	
1986	Denver Zephyrs	Vermont Reds	Cedar Rapids Reds; Tampa Tarpons	—	Billings Mustangs; GCL Reds	
1987	Nashville Sounds	Vermont Reds	Cedar Rapids Reds; Tampa Tarpons	—	Billings Mustangs; GCL Reds	
1988	Nashville Sounds	Chattanooga Lookouts	Cedar Rapids Reds; Greensboro Hornets	—	Billings Mustangs; GCL Reds	
1989	Nashville Sounds	Chattanooga Lookouts	Cedar Rapids Reds; Greensboro Hornets	—	Billings Mustangs; GCL Reds	

=== 1990–2020 ===
Minor League Baseball operated with six classes from 1990 to 2020. In 1990, the Class A level was subdivided for a second time with the creation of Class A-Advanced. The Rookie level consisted of domestic and foreign circuits.

Season	Triple-A	Double-A	Class A-Advanced	Class A	Class A Short Season	Rookie	Foreign Rookie	Ref.
1990	Nashville Sounds	Chattanooga Lookouts	—	Cedar Rapids Reds; Charleston Wheelers	—	Billings Mustangs; GCL Reds	—	
1991	Nashville Sounds	Chattanooga Lookouts	—	Cedar Rapids Reds; Charleston Wheelers	—	Billings Mustangs; Princeton Reds	—	
1992	Nashville Sounds	Chattanooga Lookouts	—	Cedar Rapids Reds; Charleston Wheelers	—	Billings Mustangs; Princeton Reds	—	
1993	Indianapolis Indians	Chattanooga Lookouts	Winston-Salem Spirits	Charleston Wheelers	—	Billings Mustangs; Princeton Reds	—	
1994	Indianapolis Indians	Chattanooga Lookouts	Winston-Salem Spirits	Charleston Wheelers	—	Billings Mustangs; Princeton Reds	—	
1995	Indianapolis Indians	Chattanooga Lookouts	Winston-Salem Warthogs	Charleston Alley Cats	—	Billings Mustangs; Princeton Reds	—	
1996	Indianapolis Indians	Chattanooga Lookouts	Winston-Salem Warthogs	Charleston Alley Cats	—	Billings Mustangs; Princeton Reds	—	
1997	Indianapolis Indians	Chattanooga Lookouts	—	Burlington Bees; Charleston Alley Cats	—	Billings Mustangs	—	
1998	Indianapolis Indians	Chattanooga Lookouts	—	Burlington Bees; Charleston Alley Cats	—	Billings Mustangs	DSL Reds	
1999	Indianapolis Indians	Chattanooga Lookouts	—	Clinton LumberKings; Rockford Reds	—	Billings Mustangs; GCL Reds	DSL Reds	
2000	Louisville RiverBats	Chattanooga Lookouts	—	Clinton LumberKings; Dayton Dragons	—	Billings Mustangs; GCL Reds	DSL Reds	
2001	Louisville RiverBats	Chattanooga Lookouts	Mudville Nine	Dayton Dragons	—	Billings Mustangs; GCL Reds	DSL Reds	
2002	Louisville Bats	Chattanooga Lookouts	Stockton Ports	Dayton Dragons	—	Billings Mustangs; GCL Reds	DSL Reds; VSL Cagua (Note: In 2002, the Reds operated a Venezuelan Summer League team as a co-op with the Minnesota Twins.)	
2003	Louisville Bats	Chattanooga Lookouts	Potomac Cannons	Dayton Dragons	—	Billings Mustangs; GCL Reds	DSL Reds; VSL Cagua (Note: In 2003, the Reds operated a Venezuelan Summer League team as a co-op with the Milwaukee Brewers.)	
2004	Louisville Bats	Chattanooga Lookouts	Potomac Cannons	Dayton Dragons	—	Billings Mustangs; GCL Reds	DSL Reds; VSL Cagua	
2005	Louisville Bats	Chattanooga Lookouts	Sarasota Reds	Dayton Dragons	—	Billings Mustangs; GCL Reds	DSL Reds; VSL Reds	
2006	Louisville Bats	Chattanooga Lookouts	Sarasota Reds	Dayton Dragons	—	Billings Mustangs; GCL Reds	DSL Reds; VSL Reds	
2007	Louisville Bats	Chattanooga Lookouts	Sarasota Reds	Dayton Dragons	—	Billings Mustangs; GCL Reds	DSL Reds; VSL Rays/Reds	
2008	Louisville Bats	Chattanooga Lookouts	Sarasota Reds	Dayton Dragons	—	Billings Mustangs; GCL Reds	DSL Diamondbacks/Reds; DSL Reds	
2009	Louisville Bats	Carolina Mudcats	Sarasota Reds	Dayton Dragons	—	Billings Mustangs; GCL Reds	DSL Reds	
2010	Louisville Bats	Carolina Mudcats	Lynchburg Hillcats	Dayton Dragons	—	Billings Mustangs; AZL Reds	DSL Reds; VSL Reds	
2011	Louisville Bats	Carolina Mudcats	Bakersfield Blaze	Dayton Dragons	—	Billings Mustangs; AZL Reds	DSL Reds; VSL Reds	
2012	Louisville Bats	Pensacola Blue Wahoos	Bakersfield Blaze	Dayton Dragons	—	Billings Mustangs; AZL Reds	DSL Diamondbacks/Reds; DSL Reds	
2013	Louisville Bats	Pensacola Blue Wahoos	Bakersfield Blaze	Dayton Dragons	—	Billings Mustangs; AZL Reds	DSL Reds; DSL Rojos	
2014	Louisville Bats	Pensacola Blue Wahoos	Bakersfield Blaze	Dayton Dragons	—	Billings Mustangs; AZL Reds	DSL Reds; DSL Rojos	
2015	Louisville Bats	Pensacola Blue Wahoos	Daytona Tortugas	Dayton Dragons	—	Billings Mustangs; AZL Reds	DSL Reds; DSL Rojos	
2016	Louisville Bats	Pensacola Blue Wahoos	Daytona Tortugas	Dayton Dragons	—	Billings Mustangs; AZL Reds	DSL Reds; DSL Rojos	
2017	Louisville Bats	Pensacola Blue Wahoos	Daytona Tortugas	Dayton Dragons	—	Billings Mustangs; AZL Reds	DSL Reds; DSL Rojos	
2018	Louisville Bats	Pensacola Blue Wahoos	Daytona Tortugas	Dayton Dragons	—	Billings Mustangs; Greeneville Reds; AZL Reds	DSL Reds	
2019	Louisville Bats	Chattanooga Lookouts	Daytona Tortugas	Dayton Dragons	—	Billings Mustangs; Greeneville Reds; AZL Reds	DSL Reds	
2020 (Note: The 2020 Minor League Baseball season was cancelled due to the COVID-19 pandemic.)	Louisville Bats	Chattanooga Lookouts	Daytona Tortugas	Dayton Dragons	—	Billings Mustangs; Greeneville Reds; AZL Reds	DSL Reds	

=== 2021–present ===
The current structure of Minor League Baseball is the result of an overall contraction of the system beginning with the 2021 season. Class A was reduced to two levels: High-A and Low-A. Low-A was reclassified as Single-A in 2022.

Season	Triple-A	Double-A	High-A	Single-A	Rookie	Foreign Rookie	Ref.
2021	Louisville Bats	Chattanooga Lookouts	Dayton Dragons	Daytona Tortugas	ACL Reds	DSL Reds	
2022	Louisville Bats	Chattanooga Lookouts	Dayton Dragons	Daytona Tortugas	ACL Reds	DSL Reds	
2023	Louisville Bats	Chattanooga Lookouts	Dayton Dragons	Daytona Tortugas	ACL Reds	DSL Reds	
2024	Louisville Bats	Chattanooga Lookouts	Dayton Dragons	Daytona Tortugas	ACL Reds	DSL Reds; DSL Rojos	
2025	Louisville Bats	Chattanooga Lookouts	Dayton Dragons	Daytona Tortugas	ACL Reds	DSL Reds; DSL Rojos	
2026	Louisville Bats	Chattanooga Lookouts	Dayton Dragons	Daytona Tortugas	ACL Reds	DSL Reds; DSL Rojos	
