= SoxProspects =

Website

- Formation: 2003; 23 years ago
- Founder: Mike Andrews
- Purpose: Coverage of Boston Red Sox prospects
- Methods: Website, podcast, forum
- Editor-in-chief: Mike Andrews
- Executive editor: Chris Hatfield
- Director of scouting: Ian Cundall
- Managing editor: James Dunne
- Funding: Donations, advertising
- Website: soxprospects.com

SoxProspects is a website dedicated to covering the minor-league system of the Boston Red Sox of Major League Baseball (MLB).

== History ==
SoxProspects.com was launched on September 20, 2003, by Mike Andrews. The website was originally designed to rank Red Sox prospects, but expanded to include a podcast, a forum, a news page, and other features that cover the entire Red Sox organization.

The website has become widely recognised as an essential component for information of the Red Sox minor-league system. Jen McCaffrey of The Athletic called SoxProspects "the definitive voice of Red-Sox minor-league coverage". Alex Speier of The Boston Globe stated that the website "has assumed a prominent place in the ecosystem of Red Sox fans, players and their families, officials, and competitors [...] occup[ying] a critical place in coverage of the minor league system that is unmatched in any other market."

SoxPropsects has had articles published on ESPN.com.
