= Venezuelan Summer League Red Sox =

- 1999–2005; Cagua / San Joaquín / Los Guayos

Minor league affiliations
- Class: Rookie
- League: Venezuelan Summer League

Major league affiliations
- Team: Boston Red Sox

The Venezuelan Summer League Red Sox, sometimes called the VSL Red Sox, (Note: Not to be confused with the DSL Red Sox.) were a Minor League Baseball affiliate of the Boston Red Sox of Major League Baseball (MLB), playing in the foreign Venezuelan Summer League (VSL). The team, classed as a Rookie League franchise, operated between 1999 and 2005. The VSL itself operated from 1997 to 2015.

During most seasons the team operated, it was a cooperative between the Red Sox and one or two other MLB teams. When the team was listed in Red Sox media guides (2003–2005), it was simply referred to as the "VSL Red Sox", although other sources show the team operated under several different names.

== Results by year ==
Year	Team	Record	Finish	Manager	Cooperative partner(s)	City	Ref.
1999	Cagua	32–24	3rd		Cubs & Reds	Cagua	
2000	San Joaquin	35–24	4th	Rudy Hernandez	Brewers & Twins	San Joaquín	
2001	San Joaquin	32–25	3rd (tie)		Brewers & Twins	San Joaquín	
2002	Ciudad Alianza	31–29	5th	Josman Robles	Brewers	Los Guayos	
2003	Ciudad Alianza	cancelled (Note: The team's 2003 season was cancelled following the Venezuelan general strike of 2002–03.)		Josman Robles	unknown	Los Guayos	
2004	Ciudad Alianza	29–33	6th	Josman Robles	none	Los Guayos	
2005	Red Sox/Padres	36–28	4th	Josman Robles	Padres	Los Guayos	

Both listed managers were Venezuelan former professional players. Rudy Hernandez played as a second baseman and third baseman from 1987 to 1991 for the New York Mets organization. Josman Robles played as a first baseman from 1988 to 1990 for the Atlanta Braves organization.

== See also ==
- Notable VSL Red Sox/Padres players (2005)
- List of Boston Red Sox minor league affiliates
