= Boston Red Sox minor league players =

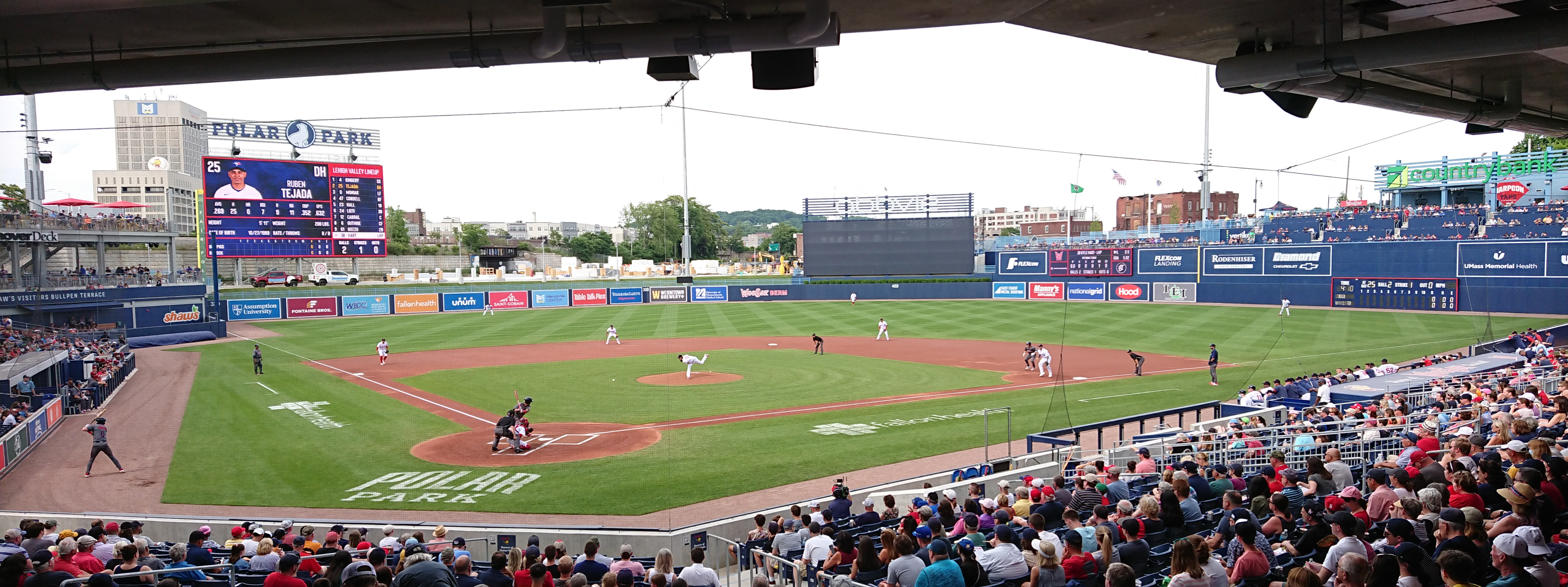
A Triple-A game featuring the Worcester Red Sox in June 2021

Below is a partial list of players in the Boston Red Sox minor league organization. Players individually listed here have not yet played in Major League Baseball (MLB), but have reached an advanced level of achievement or notoriety (most minor league players do not meet these criteria). Some notable players in the minor leagues may have their own profile pages, such as first-round draft picks. Note that anyone with a past MLB appearance has their own profile page, even if they are currently playing in the minor leagues.

== Miguel Bleis ==
Miguel Bleis

Boston Red Sox
- Outfielder
- Born: March 1, 2004 (age 22); San Pedro de Macoris, Dominican Republic
- Bats: Right Throws: Right

Miguel Bleis (born March 1, 2004) is a Dominican professional baseball outfielder in the Boston Red Sox organization.

Bleis was signed by the Boston Red Sox on January 15, 2021, and received a $1.5 million signing bonus. He was assigned to the Dominican Summer League Red Sox to begin his professional career and hit for a .252 average in 36 games. Bleis spent the 2022 season with the Rookie-level Florida Complex League Red Sox and had a .301/.353/.542 slash line with 14 doubles, four triples, and five home runs while driving in 27 runs, scoring 28 runs, and stealing 18 bases over 40 games. His season ended in August after he experienced back tightness.

Bleis entered the 2023 season ranked as a consensus top-100 prospect. He was assigned to the Salem Red Sox of the Single-A Carolina League at the beginning of the season. In 31 games, Bleis slashed .230/.282/.325 with 1 home run, 16 RBI, and 11 stolen bases. On June 10, 2023, it was announced that Bleis would undergo surgery on his left shoulder and miss the remainder of the season. Bleis began the 2024 season with Salem, ranked as the Red Sox' number five minor-league prospect by Baseball America.

- Career statistics from Baseball Reference (Minors)

== Dylan Brown ==
Dylan Tyler Brown (born June 27, 2004) is an American professional baseball pitcher in the Boston Red Sox organization.

Dylan Brown

Boston Red Sox
- Pitcher
- Born: June 27, 2004 (age 22); Abington, Pennsylvania, U.S.
- Bats: Right Throws: Left

Brown attended North Penn High School in Lansdale, Pennsylvania and played college baseball at Old Dominion University. In 2025, his junior season at Old Dominion, he made 15 starts and had a 5–2 record, a 4.06 ERA, and 102 strikeouts over 82 innings. He was invited to attend the MLB Draft Combine after the collegiate season.

Brown was selected by the Boston Red Sox in the eighth round of the 2025 Major League Baseball draft. He made his professional debut in 2026 with the Single-A Salem Red Sox and was promoted to the High-A Greenville Drive during the season. Across 22 games (21 starts) between both teams, Brown had a 6–8 record, a 3.46 ERA, and 143 strikeouts across 106 2/3 innings. The Red Sox named him their Minor League Pitcher of the Year.

- Career statistics from Baseball Reference (Minors)
- Old Dominion Monarchs bio

== Max Ferguson ==
Max Ferguson

Boston Red Sox
- Second baseman
- Born: August 23, 1999 (age 27); Jacksonville, Florida, U.S.
- Bats: Left Throws: Right

Max Tucker Ferguson (born August 23, 1999) is an American professional baseball second baseman in the Boston Red Sox organization.

Ferguson played college baseball at Tennessee for three seasons. In 2019, he played collegiate summer baseball with the Falmouth Commodores of the Cape Cod Baseball League. He compiled a .333 batting average with two home runs and nine stolen bases before his 2020 sophomore season at Tennessee was cut short due to the COVID-19 pandemic. As a junior, Ferguson batted .253 with 12 home runs and 15 stolen bases.

Ferguson was selected in the fifth round of the 2021 Major League Baseball draft by the San Diego Padres. After signing with the team he was assigned to the Rookie-level Arizona Complex League Padres before being promoted to the Lake Elsinore Storm of Low-A West and batted .212 with 29 runs scored and 15 stolen bases in 37 games between the two teams. Ferguson returned to Lake Elsinore at the beginning of the 2022 season. He batted .247 and stole 51 bases in 64 games with the team before being promoted to the High-A Fort Wayne TinCaps of the Midwest League.

On August 2, 2022, Ferguson, Eric Hosmer, Corey Rosier, and cash considerations were traded to the Boston Red Sox in exchange for Jay Groome. Ferguson finished the 2022 season with the High-A Greenville Drive. Overall with three teams during 2022, he batted a combined .214 with seven home runs and 60 RBIs in 114 games.

Ferguson spent most of 2023 with Greenville, while also playing five Triple-A games with the Worcester Red Sox. Overall for the 2023 season, he batted .228 with five home runs and 34 RBIs in 91 games.

- Career statistics from MLB · Baseball Reference (Minors)
- Tennessee Volunteers bio

== Zach Fogell ==
Zach Fogell

Boston Red Sox
- Pitcher
- Born: July 23, 2000 (age 26); Providence, Rhode Island, U.S.
- Bats: Left Throws: Left

Zachary Arthur Fogell (born July 23, 2000) is an American professional baseball pitcher in the Boston Red Sox organization.

Fogell played college baseball for Brown and UConn.

- Career statistics from Baseball Reference (Minors)

== Devin Futrell ==
Devin Futrell

Boston Red Sox – No. 95
- Pitcher
- Born: September 20, 2002 (age 24); Pembroke Pines, Florida, U.S.
- Bats: Left Throws: Left

Devin Bryce Futrell (born September 20, 2002) is an American professional baseball pitcher in the Boston Red Sox organization.

Futrell was born in 2002 in Pembroke Pines, Florida, to Mark and Denice Futrell. His older brother, Donovan, pitcher for Broward College and in a collegiate summer baseball league during 2016. Their father, Mark, was a right-handed pitcher drafted by the New York Yankees in the 66th round of the 1988 Major League Baseball draft. The elder Futrell played in Minor League Baseball for two season with the Pittsburgh Pirates organization, then played four seasons in an independent baseball league. Devin stated that his father taught him "pretty much everything" that he knows about baseball. Meanwhile, Denice recalls finding Devin teaching himself a curveball when he was 10 years old, and stopping him from doing so.

Futrell attended American Heritage School in Plantation, Florida. As a senior in 2021, Futrell produced a 0.67 earned run average (ERA) and had 78 strikeouts. Scouting service Perfect Game USA rated Futrell the number 24 prospect in Florida, and ranked him at 167th nationally.

Futrell committed to Vanderbilt University in eighth grade, despite his father's initial unwillingness for him to commit before his junior year. Futrell committed on the same day as Enrique Bradfield and Gavin Casas, his high school (and subsequently college) teammates.

During 2021, Futrell pitched in two games in a college summer league in Florida, allowing a single run in five innings pitched. Despite Futrell's eligibility for the 2021 Major League Baseball draft, he chose to reaffirm his Vanderbilt commitment through a Twitter post.

In 2022, Futrell's freshman year with the Commodores, he produced a 3.41 ERA and a 9–3 win–loss record. Futrell made his first Southeastern Conference (SEC) start on May 13 against the Arkansas Razorbacks. In his first postseason start against Oregon State, Futrell threw six shutout innings and allowed five hits, permitting the Commodores to proceed to the regional final. Futtrell was named to the freshman All-SEC team.

During his sophomore season in 2023, Futrell started the final game of the College Baseball Showdown for Vanderbilt. However, he was unavailable for a subsequent game for unspecified reasons. For the season, Futrell posted an 8–3 record in 16 appearances (15 starts), while recording a 3.44 ERA while striking out 72 batters in 83 2/3 innings.

For his junior season in 2024, Futrell made 12 appearances (10 starts) while posting a 4–1 record with a 5.40 ERA along with 44 strikeouts in 48 1/3 innings.

During the 2024 Major League Baseball draft, Futrell was selected in the 10th round by the Boston Red Sox. On July 30, 2024, Futrell signed a contract with the Red Sox for a reported $250,000 signing bonus.

- Career statistics from Baseball Reference (Minors)
- Player profile at vucommodores.com

== Justin Gonzales ==
Justin Gonzales

Boston Red Sox
- Outfielder
- Born: December 31, 2006 (age 19); Baní, Dominican Republic
- Bats: Right Throws: Right

Justin Gonzales (born December 31, 2006) is a Dominican professional baseball outfielder in the Boston Red Sox organization.

Gonzales signed with the Boston Red Sox as an international free agent in January 2024. He made his professional debut that year with the Dominican Summer League Red Sox.

Gonzales played 2025 with the Florida Complex League Red Sox, Salem Red Sox and Greenville Drive and started 2026 with Greenville. He was promoted to the Portland Sea Dogs on August 17 of that year, having slashed .271/.391/.463 with 17 home runs and 58 RBI in 89 games with Greenville.

- Career statistics from Baseball Reference (Minors)

== Nathan Hickey ==
Nathan Hickey

Boston Red Sox
- Catcher
- Born: November 23, 1999 (age 26); Jacksonville, Florida, U.S.
- Bats: Left Throws: Right

Nathaniel Thomas Hickey (born November 23, 1999) is an American professional baseball catcher in the Boston Red Sox organization.

Hickey attended the Providence School in Jacksonville, Florida and played college baseball at the University of Florida. He was drafted by the Boston Red Sox in the fifth round of the 2021 Major League Baseball draft.

Hickey spent his first professional season with Florida Complex League Red Sox and the Salem Red Sox. He started 2022 with Salem before being promoted to the Greenville Drive. He played 2023 with Greenville and the Portland Sea Dogs. After the season, he played in the Arizona Fall League.

Entering the 2024 season, Hickey was ranked as the Red Sox' number 15 minor-league prospect by Baseball America.

- Career statistics from Baseball Reference (Minors)

== John Holobetz ==
John Holobetz

Boston Red Sox
- Pitcher
- Born: July 31, 2002 (age 24); Pottsville, Pennsylvania, U.S.
- Bats: Right Throws: Right

John Cole Holobetz (born July 31, 2002) is an American professional baseball pitcher in the Boston Red Sox organization.

Holobetz attended Pottsville Area High School in Pottsville, Pennsylvania and played college baseball at Radford University and Old Dominion University. In 2023, he played collegiate summer baseball with the Yarmouth–Dennis Red Sox of the Cape Cod Baseball League. He was selected by the Milwaukee Brewers in the fifth round of the 2024 Major League Baseball draft.

Holobetz made his professional debut in 2025 with the Carolina Mudcats. On May 5, 2025, the Boston Red Sox acquired him from the Brewers as the player to be named later in an April 7 trade for Quinn Priester. He started his Red Sox career with the Greenville Drive and was promoted to the Portland Sea Dogs during the season.

- Career statistics from Baseball Reference (Minors)

== Owen Hull ==
Owen Hull

Boston Red Sox
- Outfielder
- Born: July 21, 2004 (age 22); Alexandria, Virginia, U.S.
- Bats: Left Throws: Right

Owen Hull (born July 21, 2004) is an American professional baseball outfielder in the Boston Red Sox organization.

Hull grew up in Alexandria, Virginia and attended Bishop Ireton High School, where he played baseball and basketball.

Hull began his college baseball career with the George Mason Patriots. After his freshman year, he played collegiate summer baseball for the Florence Flamingos of the Coastal Plain League and hit for a .310 average. As a sophomore, Hull batted .367 with 63 RBIs and 83 runs scored. After the season, Hull transferred to North Carolina. In his only season with the Tar Heels, he batted .393 with 103 hits, 27 doubles, nine home runs, and 87 RBIs.

Hull was selected by the Boston Red Sox with the 67th overall pick of the 2026 Major League Baseball draft. After signing with the team, he was assigned to the High-A Greenville Drive to begin his professional career.

- Career statistics from Baseball Reference (Minors)
- George Mason Patriots bio
- North Carolina Tar Heels bio

== Yordanny Monegro ==
Yordanny Monegro

Boston Red Sox
- Pitcher
- Born: October 14, 2002 (age 24); Santo Domingo, Dominican Republic
- Bats: Right Throws: Right

Yordanny Isaias Monegro (born October 14, 2002) is a Dominican professional baseball pitcher in the Boston Red Sox organization.

Monegro signed with the Boston Red Sox as an international free agent in February 2020. He made his professional debut in 2021 with the Dominican Summer League Red Sox.

Monegro played 2022 with the Florida Complex League Red Sox, 2023 with the FCL Red Sox, Salem Red Sox and Greenville Drive and 2024 with the FCL Red Sox and Greenville. He started 2025 with the Portland Sea Dogs.

- Career statistics from Baseball Reference (Minors)

== Hayden Mullins ==
Hayden Mullins

Boston Red Sox
- Pitcher
- Born: September 14, 2000 (age 26); Gallatin, Tennessee, U.S.
- Bats: Left Throws: Left

Hayden Christopher Mullins (born September 14, 2000) is an American professional baseball pitcher in the Boston Red Sox organization.

Mullins attended Hendersonville High School in Hendersonville, Tennessee and played college baseball at Auburn University. As a junior with Auburn, he totaled a 3.63 with 43 strikeouts in 11 appearances. Mullins was selected by the Boston Red Sox in the 12th round of the 2022 Major League Baseball draft.

Mullins underwent Tommy John surgery in 2022 and made his professional debut in 2023, with the Florida Complex League Red Sox and Single-A Salem Red Sox. He spent the entirety of the 2024 season with the High-A Greenville Drive, pitching to a 3.94 ERA with 118 strikeouts across 89 innings pitched. Mullins returned to Greenville to begin the 2025 campaign, before being promoted to the Double-A Portland Sea Dogs. Splitting the season between the two affiliates, he posted an 8–2 record with a 2.21 ERA with 123 strikeouts across 101 2/3 innings pitched. To begin the 2026 season, Mullins was assigned to Portland.

- Career statistics from Baseball Reference (Minors)

== Franklin Primera ==
Franklin Primera

Boston Red Sox
- Catcher
- Born: May 16, 2007 (age 19); Coro, Venezuela
- Bats: Right Throws: Right

Franklin Alexander Primera (born June 16, 2007) is a Venezuelan professional baseball catcher in the Boston Red Sox organization.

Primera signed with the Boston Red Sox as an international free agent in September 2024. He made his professional debut in 2025 with the Dominican Summer League Red Sox.

Primera started 2026 with the Florida Complex League Red Sox before being promoted to the Salem Red Sox.

- Career statistics from Baseball Reference (Minors)

== Dalton Rogers ==
Dalton Rogers

Boston Red Sox
- Pitcher
- Born: January 18, 2001 (age 25); Brandon, Mississippi, U.S.
- Bats: Right Throws: Left

Dalton Thomas Rogers (born January 18, 2001) is an American professional baseball pitcher in the Boston Red Sox organization.

Rogers attended Northwest Rankin High School in Flowood, Mississippi. Rogers played college baseball career at Southeastern Louisiana in 2020. He transferred to Jones County Junior College in 2021. He transferred again to Southern Miss in 2022. He finished the 2022 season with 1.95 ERA with 57 strikeouts in 37 innings pitched. In 2021 and 2022, he played collegiate summer baseball with the Cotuit Kettleers of the Cape Cod Baseball League.

Rogers was selected in the third round of the 2022 MLB draft by the Boston Red Sox. He was assigned to the Rookie Florida Complex League Red Sox on August 15, 2022. He was later signed to the Single–A Salem Red Sox on April 5, 2023. On May 24, 2023, he was promoted to the High–A Greenville Drive.

+^{2}/_{3} innings pitched.

- Career statistics from MLB · Baseball Reference (Minors)

== Braiden Ward ==
Braiden Ward

Boston Red Sox
- Outfielder / Second baseman
- Born: January 18, 1999 (age 27); Turlock, California, U.S.
- Bats: Left Throws: Right

Braiden Alan Ward (born January 18, 1999) is an American professional baseball outfielder and second baseman for the Boston Red Sox organization.

Ward was born in Turlock, California and his hometown is Merced, California. He attended El Capitan High School in Lakeside, California. As a senior at El Capitan, he hit .476 with 29 stolen bases, and finished his high school career ranked by Perfect Game as the twelfth best California shortstop among his draft class.

Ward attended the University of Washington, where he played four years of college baseball for the Washington Huskies. He finished his college career as the third all-time leader in stolen bases in Washington history and as the only player in Pac-12 history to lead the conference in stolen bases for three straight seasons.

After his freshman season at Washington, Ward played collegiate summer baseball in the Northwoods League with the La Crosse Loggers. After his sophomore season, he played with the Wareham Gatemen of the Cape Cod League. In summer 2020, he returned to the Northwoods League, which was operating with regional pod divisions and temporary teams due to the Covid-19 pandemic. Ward briefly played with the Northern Michigan Dune Bears, a temporary team based in Traverse City, Michigan, yet spent the bulk of the summer with his former team, the Loggers. In 2020, he led all Northwoods League players in stolen bases with 34. As of the end of the 2026 season, he remains the all-time leader in stolen bases for La Crosse players, tallying 68 total in his combined 79 games with the Loggers.

The Colorado Rockies selected Ward in the 16th round of the 2021 MLB draft. After the draft, he appeared in 17 games with the Arizona Complex League Rockies. In 2022, he split the season between the Fresno Grizzlies of the California League and the Spokane Indians of the Northwest League. He spent all of the 2023 season with Spokane, and started 2024 there as well, before being promoted to the Hartford Yard Goats of the Eastern League. 2025 was split between the Yard Goats and the Albuquerque Isotopes of the Pacific Coast League.

After the 2025 season, the Rockies traded Ward to the Boston Red Sox for Brennan Bernardino, and he played the entire 2026 season in the International League with the Worcester Red Sox.

- Career statistics from Baseball Reference (Minors)
- Washington Huskies bio

== Blake Wehunt ==
Blake Wehunt

Boston Red Sox
- Pitcher
- Born: November 9, 2000 (age 26); Athens, Georgia, U.S.
- Bats: Right Throws: Right

Blake Alexander Wehunt (born November 9, 2000) is an American professional baseball pitcher in the Boston Red Sox organization.

Wehunt attended Franklin County High School in Carnesville, Georgia. He played three years of college baseball at the University of Southern Mississippi and one year at Kennesaw State University.

Wehunt was selected by the Boston Red Sox in the ninth round of the 2023 Major League Baseball draft. He made his professional debut after signing with the Florida Complex League Red Sox with whom he pitched one scoreless inning. In 2024, Wehunt started 22 games between the Salem Red Sox, Greenville Drive, and Portland Sea Dogs, going 3–7 with a 3.88 ERA and 110 strikeouts over 97 1/3 innings. He played the 2025 season with Portland and went 2–8 with a 5.68 ERA and 76 strikeouts across 73 1/3 innings and 17 games. Wehunt opened the 2026 season with Portland and was promoted to the Worcester Red Sox in July. With Portland, he was named the team's Pitcher of the Year. Across 23 starts between both teams, Wehunt had an 8–5 record, a 3.50 ERA, and 104 strikeouts over 100 1/3 innings.

- Career statistics from Baseball Reference (Minors)
- Southern Miss Golden Eagles
- Kennesaw State Owls bio

== Mason White ==
Mason White

Boston Red Sox
- Shortstop
- Born: September 21, 2003 (age 23); Tucson, Arizona, U.S.
- Bats: Left Throws: Right

Mason White (born September 21, 2003) is an American professional baseball shortstop in the Boston Red Sox organization.

White attended Salpointe Catholic High School in Tucson, Arizona. As a junior in 2021, he batted .354 with 31 RBI. He went unselected in the 2022 Major League Baseball draft, and enrolled at the University of Arizona where he played college baseball for the Arizona Wildcats.

As a freshman for Arizona in 2023, White played in 53 games and hit .313 with ten home runs and 35 RBI, earning Freshman All-American honors from Collegiate Baseball Newspaper. After the season, he played collegiate summer baseball in the Cape Cod Baseball League (CCBL) with the Brewster Whitecaps. In 2024 for Arizona, White appeared in 59 games and batted .305 with 19 home runs and 65 RBI. Following the season's end, he returned to play in the CCBL with the Hyannis Harbor Hawks. As a junior at Arizona in 2025, White played in 65 games and had a .327 batting average, 20 home runs, and 73 RBI.

White was selected by the Boston Red Sox in the fourth round of the 2025 Major League Baseball draft. He signed with the team for $642,200. White made his professional debut after signing with the Single-A Salem Red Sox, and also played with the High-A Greenville Drive. Across 26 games, he hit .238. White was assigned to Greenville to begin the 2026 season and was promoted to the Double-A Portland Sea Dogs in July. Over 101 games between the two teams, he batted .251 with 18 home runs and 55 RBI. After the season, White was assigned to play in the Arizona Fall League with the Mesa Solar Sox.

- Career statistics from Baseball Reference (Minors)
- Arizona Wildcats bio

== Nazzan Zanetello ==
Nazzan Zanetello

Boston Red Sox
- Shortstop
- Born: May 25, 2005 (age 21); Bridgeton, Missouri, U.S.
- Bats: Right Throws: Right

Nazzan Avant Zanetello (born May 25, 2005) is an American professional baseball shortstop in the Boston Red Sox organization.

Zanetello grew up in Florissant, Missouri, and attended Christian Brothers College High School (CBC). He had a .399 batting average with 15 home runs and 92 RBIs in three varsity seasons. As a senior, Zanetello batted .421 with 9 home runs, 33 RBIs, and 21 stolen bases. During the fall of his senior year, he was a member of the United States national under-18 baseball team and batted .429 in the qualifying tournament for the 2022 U-18 Baseball World Cup. Zanetello also played basketball at CBC and was coached by Justin Tatum, the father of Boston Celtics player Jayson Tatum. Zanetello committed to play college baseball for the Arkansas Razorbacks.

The Boston Red Sox selected Zanetello in the second round with the 50th pick in the 2023 Major League Baseball draft. Zanetello signed with the Red Sox on July 21, 2023, for an over-slot deal worth $3 million. During the 2023 season, he appeared in a total of 14 games; 13 with the Florida Complex League Red Sox and one with the Single-A Salem Red Sox, posting a combined .319 batting average.

Zanetello began the 2024 season with Salem, ranked as the Red Sox' number 12 minor-league prospect by Baseball America.

- Career statistics from MLB · ESPN · Fangraphs · Baseball Reference (Minors)

== Full Triple-A to Rookie League rosters ==
As part of Major League Baseball's restructuring of Minor League Baseball prior to the 2021 season, the Red Sox dropped the Lowell Spinners, a Class A Short Season team, as an affiliate.

=== Triple-A ===
The Worcester Red Sox are members of the International League. They have been a Red Sox affiliate since 2021.

Worcester Red Sox roster
Players		Coaches/Other
Pitchers: 41 Angel Bastardo; -- Max Carlson; 64 Isaac Coffey; 55 Patrick Halligan; 64 John Holobetz; 40 Joe La Sorsa *; 53 Michael Sansone; 35 Noah Song; 47 Blake Wehunt; 63 Gage Ziehl	Catchers: -- Riley Adams; 52 Nate Baez; 33 Nathan Hickey; Infielders: 16 Franklin Arias; 18 Max Ferguson; 60 Brett Harris *; -- Ahbram Liendo; 21 Tyler McDonough; -- Brendan Rodgers; 7 Mikey Romero; Outfielders: 3 Braiden Ward	Manager: 2 Iggy Suarez; Coaches: 61 Brendon Connolly (development); 22 Dan DeLucia (pitching); 10 Rich Gedman (hitting); 30 Noah Junis (bullpen); 16 Johnny Reina (assistant hitting); 7-day injured list; * On Boston Red Sox 40-man roster; ~ Development list; # Rehab assignment; ∞ Reserve list; ‡ Restricted list; § Suspended list; † Temporarily inactive list; Roster updated November 2, 2026; Transactions; → More rosters: MiLB • International League; → Boston Red Sox minor league players

=== Double-A ===
The Portland Sea Dogs are members of the Eastern League. They have been a Red Sox affiliate since 2003.

Portland Sea Dogs roster
Players		Coaches/Other
Pitchers: 35 Cooper Adams; 23 Caleb Bolden; 53 Alex Bouchard; 30 Steven Brooks; 39 Devin Futrell; 17 Griffin Kilander; 22 Morgan McSweeney; 57 Yordanny Monegro; 47 Hayden Mullins; 29 Aaron Nixon; 15 Dalton Rogers; 36 Joe Vogatsky	Catchers: 11 Brooks Brannon; 38 Johanfran Garcia; Infielders: 52 Marvin Alcantara; 17 Yoeilin Cespedes; 21 Henry Godbout; 18 Mason White; 16 Jack Winnay; Outfielders: 2 Miguel Bleis; 49 Justin Gonzales; 24 Isaiah Jackson; 7 Caden Rose; 3 Nelly Taylor; 5 Will Turner	Manager: 54 Kyle Sasala; Coaches: 53 Elijah Boyer (assistant hitting); 88 Trevor Burmeister (hitting); 77 Isaiah Page (assistant pitching); 66 Juan Rivera (pitching); 7-day injured list; * On Boston Red Sox 40-man roster; ~ Development list; # Rehab assignment; ∞ Reserve list; ‡ Restricted list; § Suspended list; † Temporarily inactive list; Roster updated November 2, 2026; Transactions; → More rosters: MiLB • Eastern League; → Boston Red Sox minor league players

=== High-A ===
The Greenville Drive are members of South Atlantic League. They have been a Red Sox affiliate since 2005.

Greenville Drive roster
Players		Coaches/Other
Pitchers: 51 Adam Bates; 39 Calvin Bickerstaff; 30 Dylan Brown; 6 Luis Cohen; 11 Tyler Davis; 28 Matt Duffy; 33 Leighton Finley; -- Zach Fogell; 40 Joey Gartrell; 26 Jason Gilman; 35 Jacob Mayers; 37 Matt McShane; 16 Barrett Morgan; 22 Brandon Neely; 52 Trennor O'Donnell; 23 Marcus Phillips; 29 Shea Sprague; -- Isaac Stebens; 20 Brady Tygart; 30 Juan Valera	Catchers: 24 Ronny Hernandez; 15 Luke Heyman; 19 Gerardo Rodriguez; Infielders: 1 Antonio Anderson; 6 Freili Encarnacion; 55 Maximus Martin; 41 Jake Schaffner; 2 Nazzan Zanetello; Outfielders: 44 Carlos Gutierrez; 10 Owen Hull; 3 Skylar King; 18 Yophery Rodriguez; 9 Givian Sirvania; 12 Stanley Tucker	Manager: 4 Liam Carroll; Coaches: 14 Cody Gracco (assistant hitting); 13 Bob Kipper (pitching coach); 17 Jarrett Pico (hitting); 21 Andrew Sadoski (assistant pitching); 8 Ty Snep (coach); 7-day injured list; * On Boston Red Sox 40-man roster; ~ Development list; # Rehab assignment; ∞ Reserve list; ‡ Restricted list; § Suspended list; † Temporarily inactive list; Roster updated November 2, 2026; Transactions; → More rosters: MiLB • South Atlantic League; → Boston Red Sox minor league players

=== Single-A ===
The Salem RidgeYaks are members of Carolina League. They have been a Red Sox affiliate since 2009.

Salem RidgeYaks roster
Players		Coaches/Other
Pitchers: 6 Jose Bello; 30 Harry Blum; 44 Yander Bonaci; 31 Nicolas De La Cruz; 33 Sabdiel Delzine; 99 Christian Foutch; 5 Madinson Frias; 4 Gilbel Galvan; 34 Nicholas Judice; 22 Alex Kranzler; 1 Williams Montero; 15 Berny Ortiz; 24 Cam Padgett; 23 Myles Patton; 29 Carson Revay; 33 Dalvinson Reyes; 36 Wuilliams Rodriguez; 39 Yermain Ruiz; 26 Cole Tolbert; 35 Caden Vire; 20 Ethan Walker	Catchers: 18 Adonys Guzman; 34 Andruw Musett; 23 Franklin Primera; 13 Kleyver Salazar; Infielders: 14 Louis Andujar; 2 Colton Coates; 10 Anderson Fermin; 2 Ty Hodge; 4 Wills Maginnis; 38 Starlyn Nunez; 11 D'Angelo Ortiz; 8 Avinson Pinto; Outfielders: 39 Justin Barry; 16 Josue Brito; 25 Andrews Opata; 3 Martin Shelar	Manager: 9 Ozzie Chavez; Coaches: 48 Brendan Argomaniz (assistant pitching); -- Nelson Paulino (hitting); 27 Ivan Quackenbush (assistant hitting); 51 Alex Reynolds (pitching); 26 Kyle Schmidt (coach); 29 Jack Simonetty (hitting); 7-day injured list; * On Boston Red Sox 40-man roster; ~ Development list; # Rehab assignment; ∞ Reserve list; ‡ Restricted list; § Suspended list; † Temporarily inactive list; Roster updated November 2, 2026; Transactions; → More rosters: MiLB • Carolina League; → Boston Red Sox minor league players

=== Rookie ===
The Florida Complex League Red Sox are members of the Florida Complex League (FCL). They have been a Red Sox affiliate since 1989; the team was known as the Gulf Coast League Red Sox prior to 2021.

Florida Complex League Red Sox roster
Players		Coaches/Other
Pitchers: -- Kide Adetuyi; 12 Merlin Bido; -- Luis Calderon; 57 Rony Calderon; 71 Christopher Cordero; -- Lucas Davenport; 76 Yomar De La Rosa; 10 Juanyerlin Duran; -- Jase Evangelista; -- Cade Fisher; 28 Jakson Gamboa; 64 Angelo Ladera; -- Kaleb LaFavor; -- Brett Lanman; -- Mason Lei; 99 Jeison Payano; 39 Eddison Septimo; 22 Yoandys Veraza; -- Josh Volmerding	Catchers: -- Jorhan Castro; 77 Liosward Marin; 81 Jorge Rodriguez; Infielders: 2 Christopher Alvarado; 16 Jhorman Bravo; 25 Edwin Darville; -- Jace Mataczynski; 7 Hector Ramos; 17 Dorian Soto; -- Jacob Webster; Outfielders: 15 Tavano Baker; 35 Fabian Bonilla; 48 Jostin Ogando; 32 Jhoan Peguero; 11 Harold Rivas	Manager: 24 Chase Illig; Coaches: 37 Oscar Lira (pitching); 88 Michael McCormick (pitching); 75 Wade Satzinger (hitting); 22 Steven Su (defensive); 36 Junior Zamora (hitting); 7-day injured list; * On Boston Red Sox 40-man roster; ~ Development list; # Rehab assignment; ∞ Reserve list; ‡ Restricted list; § Suspended list; † Temporarily inactive list; Roster updated November 2, 2026; Transactions; → More rosters: MiLB • Florida Complex League; → Boston Red Sox minor league players

=== Foreign Rookie ===
The Dominican Summer League Red Sox are members of the Dominican Summer League (DSL). They have been a Red Sox affiliate since 1997. Since 2015, the Red Sox have usually fielded two teams in the DSL, differentiated as 1 and 2 or Blue and Red.

Dominican Summer League Red Sox Blue roster
Players		Coaches/Other
Pitchers: -- Victor Aracena; 44 Cristian Alcantara; 59 Harry Canedo; 64 Luis Cayama; 68 Erickson Ettien; 2 Carlos Falcon; 47 Allan Griman; 30 Emanuel Jiminez; 71 Jesus Lopez; 25 Michael Manjarres; 36 Jesus Martinez; 59 Pedro Meza; -- Albert Pena; 51 Leosmar Perez; 38 Pablo Serrano; 43 Cristopher Silvestre; 54 Juan Verdus; 61 Charlie Zink	Catchers: 31 Dilan Mata; 22 Kevin Morillo; 18 Santiago Yanes; Infielders: 5 Luis Aular; 19 Esterlin Casanova; 58 Anderson Gonzalez; 55 Isaac Velasquez; 3 Miguel Welch; Outfielders: 29 Enmanuel Figuereo; 37 Eber Miranda; 17 Garielvin Silverio; 36 Maikol Tovar; 41 Freyerso Vasquez	Manager: 16 Sandy Madera; Coaches: 50 Bryan Delgado (pitching); 53 Wade Satzinger (hitting); 40 Lioner Vasquez (pitching); 2 Yeyson Yrizarri (coach); 7-day injured list; * On Boston Red Sox 40-man roster; ~ Development list; # Rehab assignment; ∞ Reserve list; ‡ Restricted list; § Suspended list; † Temporarily inactive list; Roster updated November 2, 2026; Transactions; → More rosters: MiLB • Dominican Summer League; → Boston Red Sox minor league players

Dominican Summer League Red Sox Red roster
Players		Coaches/Other
Pitchers: 23 Jose Alexandro; 55 Wascar Berroa; 18 Isaac Brujan; 24 Ranci Castillo; 41 Leonel Figuera; -- Juan Garcia; 44 Steven Garcia; 15 Alexander Heredia; 51 Anthony Herrera; 61 Radinsson Lopez; 12 Rinangel Mayora; 22 Robert Moreno; -- Claudio Pereira; 38 Yeider Pineda; 25 Angel Roa; 31 Oscar Vaamonde; 12 Yariel Valdez; 32 Maikel Vargas; 17 Ranfi Vargas	Catchers: 58 Edgardo Gutierrez; 13 Lester Suarez; Infielders: 19 Dawvris Brito; 36 Wilneyker Bruce; 72 Axell Herrera; 43 Diomar Hidalgo; 46 Anderber Urbina; Outfielders: 5 Gustavo Antunez; 68 Geomaikel Martinez; 3 Jhonny Osta; 28 Joskairo Ramirez	Manager: 22 Amaury Garcia; Coaches: 33 Caleb Berry (hitting); 50 Rafael Feliz (pitching); 31 Juan Hernandez (hitting); 58 Claudio Sanchez (coach); 57 Matt Wheeler (pitching); 7-day injured list; * On Boston Red Sox 40-man roster; ~ Development list; # Rehab assignment; ∞ Reserve list; ‡ Restricted list; § Suspended list; † Temporarily inactive list; Roster updated November 3, 2026; Transactions; → More rosters: MiLB • Dominican Summer League; → Boston Red Sox minor league players

== See also ==
- List of Boston Red Sox minor league affiliates
