= Los Guayos Municipality =

Los Guayos Municipality Municipio Los Guayos
- Municipality
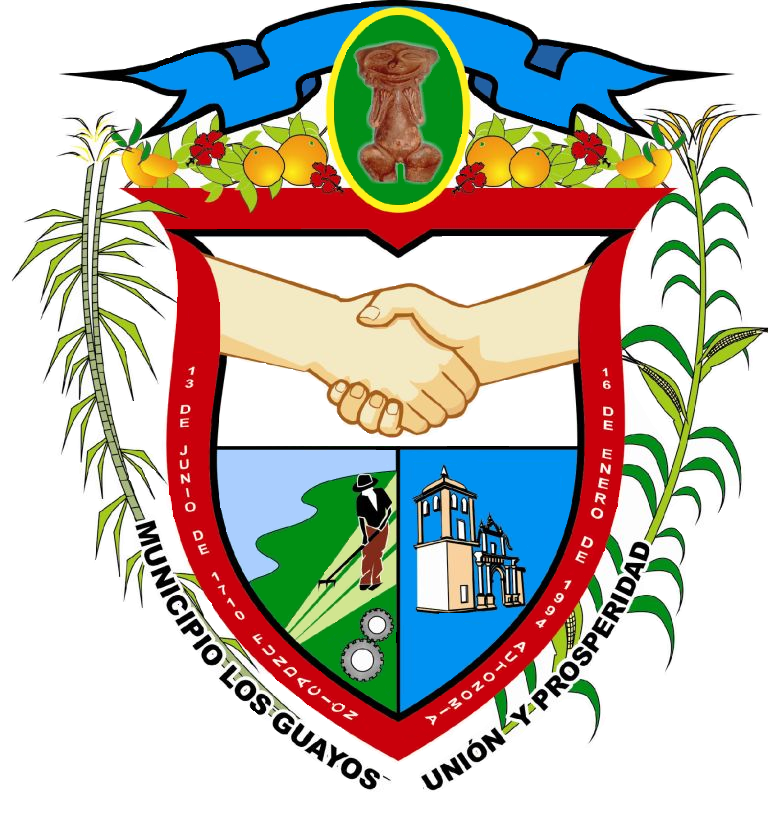
- Coat of arms

- Location in Carabobo

- Location in Venezuela
- Coordinates: 10°09′15″N 67°54′04″W
- Country: Venezuela
- State: Carabobo
- Municipal seat: Los Guayos

Government
  - Mayor: Mervelis Moreno Caldera (PSUV)

Area
  - Total: 67.7 km^{2} (26.1 sq mi)

Population (2011)
  - Total: 149,646
  - Density: 2,210/km^{2} (5,720/sq mi)
- Time zone: UTC−4 (VET)
- Area code(s): 0241
- Website: Official website

The Los Guayos Municipality is one of the 14 municipalities (municipios) that makes up the Venezuelan state of Carabobo and, according to the 2011 census by the National Institute of Statistics of Venezuela, the municipality has a population of 149,646. The town of Los Guayos is the shire town of the Los Guayos Municipality.

== History ==
On February 20, 1694, Don Francisco Berroterán, governor of the Province of Venezuela, declared Los Guayos "Town of Indians". The area was belonged to the Guayos tribe. On June 6, 1710, the priest Mariano de Martí made "Los Guayos" a parish. In 1751, inhabitants of Los Guayos joined the national uprising led by Francisco de León against the Compañía Guipuzcoana. In 1812, Francisco de Miranda left a troop in the town of Los Guayos to defend the road against the Spanish troops while he followed his campaign in the Valencia region. The troop engaged in a battle with the Spanish troops and was about to win the battle when one of its officers turned to the enemy. The troop then dispersed itself.

== Geography ==
The town of Los Guayos is part of the Los Guayos municipality. In later years, it had become closer to merging with other towns in the area. The Caracas-Valencia motorway lies immediately to the North-Northeast of Los Guayos. The Los Guayos river runs from the northeast to the southeast part of the town.

== Sites of Interest ==
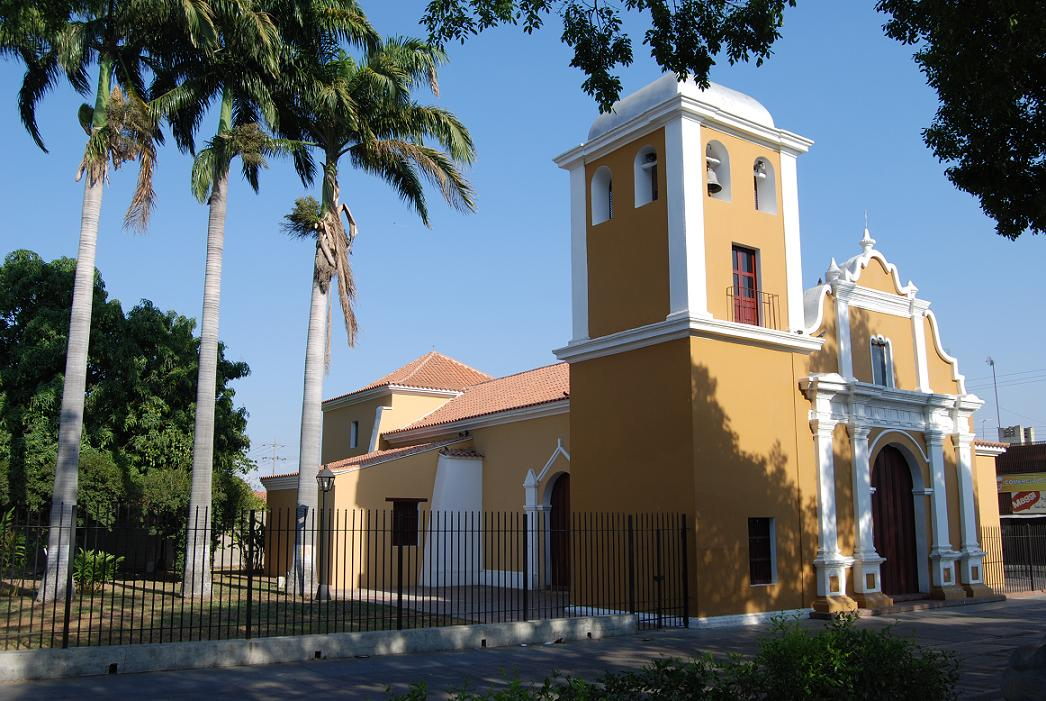
Colonial church of Los Guayos

The Colonial church of San Antonio de Padua or Church of Los Guayos: This is one of the oldest churches in Venezuela. Its first building dates back to 1650, when it was the church for the tribes of the area. The bell tower, with two adjacent areas, dates back to 1779.

== Demographics ==
The Los Guayos Municipality, according to a 2007 population estimate by the National Institute of Statistics of Venezuela, has a population of 157,787 (up from 133,237 in 2000). This amounts to 7.1% of the state's population. The municipality's population density is 2,465.42 inhabitants per square kilometre (6,385.4/sq mi).

== Government ==
The mayor of the Los Guayos Municipality in 2008 was Anibal Jose Dose Rumbos. He was re-elected on November 23, 2008 with 52% of the vote. The municipality is divided into one parish (Los Guayos).

== See also ==
- Los Guayos
- Carabobo
- Municipalities of Venezuela
