= List of Boston Red Sox minor league affiliates =

Current Boston Red Sox domestic minor league affiliate locations

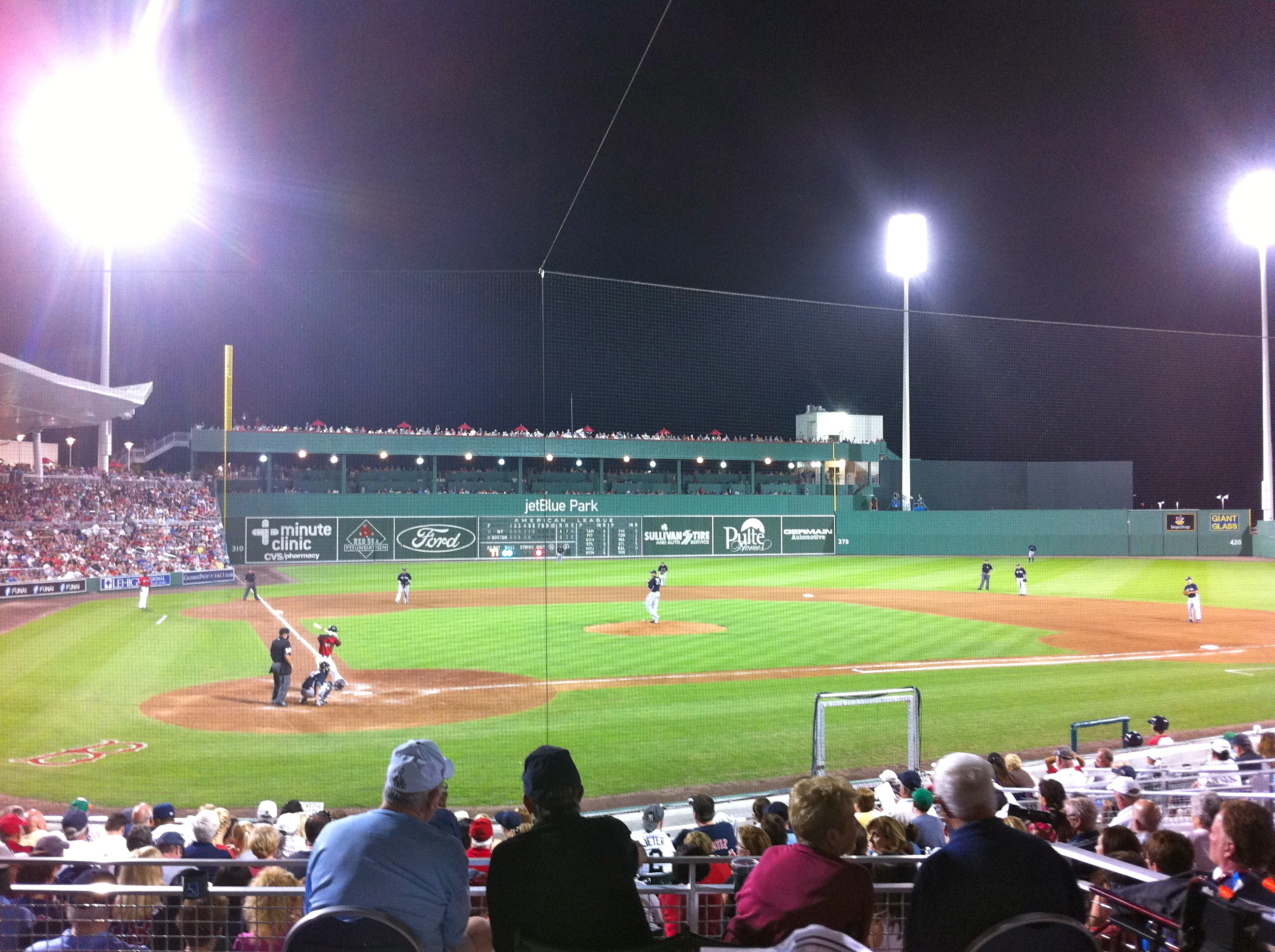
JetBlue Park, home ballpark of the Florida Complex League Red Sox

The Boston Red Sox of Major League Baseball (MLB) maintain a farm system consisting of four Minor League Baseball affiliates across the United States. Additionally, the Red Sox own and operate complex-based rookie level squads playing in the Florida Complex League in Florida and the Dominican Summer League in the Dominican Republic.

Of the non-complex based teams, the Portland Sea Dogs have been a Red Sox affiliate since 2003, the Greenville Drive have been an affiliate since 2005, the Salem RidgeYaks have been an affiliate since 2009, and the Worcester Red Sox entered their debut season in 2021. The Worcester Red Sox succeeded the Pawtucket Red Sox, who were a Red Sox affiliate from 1970 through 2020. (Note: In 1976, the Pawtucket Red Sox were officially known as the Rhode Island Red Sox.) The Salem RidgeYaks are owned by Fenway Sports Group, who also own the major league club, while the other three affiliates are independently owned.

Geographically, Worcester is Boston's closest domestic affiliate, located approximately 45 miles (72 km) from Fenway Park. Boston's furthest domestic affiliate is the Fenway South-based FCL Red Sox, located some 1,247 miles (2,007 km) away.

== Current affiliates ==
The Boston Red Sox farm system consists of seven minor league affiliates.

Class	Team	League	Location	Ballpark	Affiliated
Triple-A	Worcester Red Sox	International League	Worcester, Massachusetts	Polar Park	2021
Double-A	Portland Sea Dogs	Eastern League	Portland, Maine	Hadlock Field	2003
High-A	Greenville Drive	South Atlantic League	Greenville, South Carolina	Fluor Field at the West End	2005
Single-A	Salem RidgeYaks	Carolina League	Salem, Virginia	Salem Memorial Ballpark	2009
Rookie	FCL Red Sox	Florida Complex League	Fort Myers, Florida	JetBlue Park	1989
Rookie	DSL Red Sox Blue	Dominican Summer League	Santo Domingo	El Toro Complex	1997
Rookie	DSL Red Sox Red	Dominican Summer League	Santo Domingo	El Toro Complex	1997

== List of affiliates by season ==
The below tables list Red Sox affiliates for each season since the team established its first such relationship. Sections are grouped by era, based on changes in minor league classifications. Instances of the Red Sox sharing an affiliate with other MLB teams are independently counted in parentheses, with the partner team(s) listed in an endnote.

=== 1928–1945 ===
Major league teams had affiliate relationships with minor league teams as early as 1920, when the Detroit Tigers, Pittsburgh Pirates, and St. Louis Cardinals each had a farm team in the Texas League. The first team that had an affiliate relationship with the Red Sox was the Salem Witches of the New England League in 1928.

Prior to 1946, Double-A was the highest level of play in the minor leagues. Additional classifications were A through D, each of which was used by the Red Sox. Class A1 was created in 1936 and existed through 1945, and was also used by the Red Sox for several seasons. One Class E league existed in 1943, but was not used by the Red Sox.

Year	Double-A	Class A1	Class A	Class B	Class C	Class D	No./Ref.
1928	—		—	Salem Witches	—	—	1
1929	—		—	—	—	—	0
1930	—		—	—	—	—	0
1931	—		—	—	—	—	0
1932	—		—	Hazleton Mountaineers; Wilmington Pirates	—	—	2
1933	—		Reading Red Sox	—	—	—	1
1934	Kansas City Blues		Reading Red Sox	Columbia Sandlappers / Asheville Tourists	Joplin Miners	—	4
1935	—		—	Charlotte Hornets	Shreveport Sports / Gladewater Bears	Danville-Schoolfield Leafs	3
1936	San Diego Padres; Syracuse Chiefs	Little Rock Travelers	Elmira Colonels	Rocky Mount Red Sox	Helena Seaporters; Canton Terriers	Danville-Schoolfield Leafs; Eau Claire Bears	9
1937	—	Little Rock Travelers	Hazleton Red Sox	Rocky Mount Red Sox	Brockville Blues; Clarksdale Red Sox; Canton Terriers	Elizabethton Betsy Red Sox; Danville-Schoolfield Leafs; Opelousas Indians; Moultrie Packers; Mansfield Red Sox	11
1938	Minneapolis Millers	Little Rock Travelers	Hazleton Red Sox	Rocky Mount Red Sox	Clarksdale Red Sox; Canton Terriers	Elizabethton Betsy Red Sox; Danville-Schoolfield Leafs; Moultrie Packers; Crookston Pirates	10
1939	Louisville Colonels	Little Rock Travelers	Scranton Red Sox	Rocky Mount Red Sox	Clarksdale Red Sox; Canton Terriers	Elizabethton Betsy Red Sox; Danville-Schoolfield Leafs; Centreville Colts	9
1940	Louisville Colonels	—	Scranton Red Sox	Rocky Mount Red Sox	Canton Terriers	Elizabethton Betsy Red Sox; Danville-Schoolfield Leafs; Centreville Red Sox	7
1941	Louisville Colonels	—	Scranton Red Sox	Greensboro Red Sox	Canton Terriers	Danville-Schoolfield Leafs; Centreville Red Sox; Owensboro Oilers	7
1942	Louisville Colonels	—	Scranton Red Sox	Greensboro Red Sox	Oneonta Indians; Canton Terriers	Danville-Schoolfield Leafs; Owensboro Oilers	7
1943	Louisville Colonels	—	Scranton Red Sox	Roanoke Red Sox	—	—	3
1944	Louisville Colonels	—	Scranton Red Sox	Roanoke Red Sox	—	Middletown Red Sox	4
1945	Louisville Colonels	—	Scranton Red Sox	Roanoke Red Sox	Durham Bulls	—	4

=== 1946–1962 ===
The minors operated with six classes (Triple-A, Double-A, and Classes A, B, C, and D) from 1946 to 1962. The Pacific Coast League (PCL) was reclassified from Triple-A to Open in 1952 due to the possibility of becoming a third major league. This arrangement ended following the 1957 season when the relocation of the National League's Dodgers and Giants to the West Coast ended any chance of the PCL being promoted.

Year	Triple-A	Double-A	Class A	Class B	Class C	Class D	No./Ref.
1946	Louisville Colonels	New Orleans Pelicans	Scranton Red Sox	Lynn Red Sox; Roanoke Red Sox	Durham Bulls; Oneonta Red Sox	Geneva Red Birds; Milford Red Sox; New Iberia Cardinals; Tarboro Tars	11
1947	Louisville Colonels; Toronto Maple Leafs	New Orleans Pelicans	Scranton Red Sox	Lynn Red Sox; Roanoke Red Sox	Oneonta Red Sox; San Jose Red Sox	Milford Red Sox; Wellsville Nitros	10
1948	Louisville Colonels	Birmingham Barons	Scranton Red Sox	Lynn Red Sox; Roanoke Red Sox	Auburn Cayugas; El Paso Texans; Oneonta Red Sox; San Jose Red Sox	Milford Red Sox; Oroville Red Sox; Valley Rebels; Wellsville Nitros	13
1949	Louisville Colonels	Birmingham Barons	Scranton Red Sox	Roanoke Red Sox	Oneonta Red Sox; San Jose Red Sox	Hornell Maple Leafs; Marion Red Sox; Valley Rebels	9
1950	Louisville Colonels	Birmingham Barons	Scranton Red Sox	Roanoke Red Sox	Oneonta Red Sox; San Jose Red Sox	Kinston Eagles; Marion Red Sox	8
1951	Louisville Colonels	Birmingham Barons	Scranton Red Sox	Roanoke Ro-Sox	Oneonta Red Sox; San Jose Red Sox	High Point-Thomasville Hi-Toms; Marion Red Sox	8
1952	Louisville Colonels	Birmingham Barons	Albany Senators	Roanoke Ro-Sox	San Jose Red Sox	High Point-Thomasville Hi-Toms	6
1953	Louisville Colonels	—	Albany Senators	Greensboro Patriots; Roanoke Ro-Sox	San Jose Red Sox	Salisbury Rocots	6
1954	Louisville Colonels	—	Albany Senators	Greensboro Patriots	San Jose Red Sox	Bluefield Blue-Grays; Corning Red Sox	6
1955	Louisville Colonels	—	Montgomery Rebels	Greensboro Patriots	San Jose Red Sox	Bluefield Blue-Grays; Corning Red Sox	6
1956	San Francisco Seals†	Oklahoma City Indians	Albany Senators	Greensboro Patriots	—	Corning Red Sox; Lafayette Red Sox; Lexington Red Sox	8
1957	San Francisco Seals†	Oklahoma City Indians	Albany Senators	Greensboro Patriots	—	Corning Red Sox; Lafayette Red Sox; Lexington Red Sox	7
1958	Minneapolis Millers	Memphis Chickasaws	Allentown Red Sox	Raleigh Capitals	—	Corning Red Sox; Lexington Red Sox; Waterloo Hawks	7
1959	Minneapolis Millers	—	Allentown Red Sox	Raleigh Capitals	—	Alpine Cowboys; Corning Cor-Sox; Waterloo Hawks	6
1960	Minneapolis Millers	—	Allentown Red Sox	Raleigh Capitals	—	Alpine Cowboys; Corning Red Sox; Waterloo Hawks	6
1961	Seattle Rainiers	—	Johnstown Red Sox	Winston-Salem Red Sox	—	Alpine Cowboys; Olean Red Sox; Waterloo Hawks	6
1962	Seattle Rainiers	—	York White Roses	Winston-Salem Red Sox	Pocatello Chiefs	Olean Red Sox; Waterloo Hawks	6

† Open classification (used by the PCL during 1952–1957)

=== 1963–1989 ===
The foundation of the minors' current structure was the result of a reorganization initiated by Major League Baseball (MLB) before the 1963 season. The reduction from six classes to four (Triple-A, Double-AA, Class A, and Rookie) was a response to the general decline of the minors throughout the 1950s and early-1960s when leagues and teams folded due to shrinking attendance caused by baseball fans' preference for staying at home to watch MLB games on television. The 1963 reorganization resulted in the Eastern and South Atlantic Leagues being elevated from Class A to Double-A, five of seven Class D circuits plus the ones in B and C upgraded to A, and the Appalachian League reclassified from D to Rookie. The only change made within the next 27 years was some Class A teams adopting "Short Season" schedules starting in 1965. (Note: The Northern League adopted a June–September schedule in 1965; the Northwest League did so in 1966, and the New York–Penn League did so in 1967.)

Year	Triple-A	Double-A	Class A	Class A Short Season	Rookie League	No./Ref.
1963	Seattle Rainiers	Reading Red Sox	Waterloo Hawks; Wellsville Red Sox; Winston-Salem Red Sox		—	5
1964	Seattle Rainiers	Reading Red Sox	Waterloo Hawks; Wellsville Red Sox; Winston-Salem Red Sox; Statesville Colts (Note: In 1964, the Red Sox and Houston Colt .45s shared the Statesville farm team.)		—	5(1)
1965	Toronto Maple Leafs	Pittsfield Red Sox	Waterloo Hawks; Wellsville Red Sox; Winston-Salem Red Sox	—	Harlan Red Sox	6
1966	Toronto Maple Leafs	Pittsfield Red Sox	Oneonta Red Sox; Waterloo Hawks; Winston-Salem Red Sox	—	Covington Red Sox	6
1967	Toronto Maple Leafs	Pittsfield Red Sox	Greenville Red Sox; Waterloo Hawks; Winston-Salem Red Sox	—	—	5
1968	Louisville Colonels	Pittsfield Red Sox	Greenville Red Sox; Waterloo Hawks; Winston-Salem Red Sox	Jamestown Falcons	—	6
1969	Louisville Colonels	Pittsfield Red Sox	Greenville Red Sox; Winston-Salem Red Sox; Winter Haven Red Sox	Jamestown Falcons	—	6
1970	Louisville Colonels	Pawtucket Red Sox	Greenville Red Sox; Winston-Salem Red Sox; Winter Haven Red Sox	Jamestown Falcons	—	6
1971	Louisville Colonels	Pawtucket Red Sox	Greenville Red Sox; Winston-Salem Red Sox; Winter Haven Red Sox	Williamsport Red Sox	—	6
1972	Louisville Colonels	Pawtucket Red Sox	Winston-Salem Red Sox; Winter Haven Red Sox	Williamsport Red Sox	—	5
1973	Pawtucket Red Sox	Bristol Red Sox	Winston-Salem Red Sox; Winter Haven Red Sox	Elmira Pioneers	—	5
1974	Pawtucket Red Sox	Bristol Red Sox	Winston-Salem Red Sox; Winter Haven Red Sox	Elmira Red Sox (Note: During 1974–1983, the Elmira franchise—best known as the Pioneers—used several different nicknames.)	—	5
1975	Pawtucket Red Sox	Bristol Red Sox	Winston-Salem Red Sox; Winter Haven Red Sox	Elmira Red Sox	—	5
1976	Pawtucket Red Sox	Bristol Red Sox	Winston-Salem Red Sox; Winter Haven Red Sox	Elmira Red Sox	—	5
1977	Pawtucket Red Sox	Bristol Red Sox	Winston-Salem Red Sox; Winter Haven Red Sox	Elmira Pioneer-Red Sox	—	5
1978	Pawtucket Red Sox	Bristol Red Sox	Winston-Salem Red Sox; Winter Haven Red Sox	Elmira Red Sox	—	5
1979	Pawtucket Red Sox	Bristol Red Sox	Winston-Salem Red Sox; Winter Haven Red Sox	Elmira Pioneers	—	5
1980	Pawtucket Red Sox	Bristol Red Sox	Winston-Salem Red Sox; Winter Haven Red Sox	Elmira Pioneers	—	5
1981	Pawtucket Red Sox	Bristol Red Sox	Winston-Salem Red Sox; Winter Haven Red Sox	Elmira Suns	—	5
1982	Pawtucket Red Sox	Bristol Red Sox	Winston-Salem Red Sox; Winter Haven Red Sox	Elmira Suns	—	5
1983	Pawtucket Red Sox	New Britain Red Sox	Winston-Salem Red Sox; Winter Haven Red Sox	Elmira Suns	—	5
1984	Pawtucket Red Sox	New Britain Red Sox	Winston-Salem Spirits; Winter Haven Red Sox	Elmira Pioneers	—	5
1985	Pawtucket Red Sox	New Britain Red Sox	Greensboro Hornets; Winter Haven Red Sox	Elmira Pioneers	—	5
1986	Pawtucket Red Sox	New Britain Red Sox	Greensboro Hornets; Winter Haven Red Sox	Elmira Pioneers	—	5
1987	Pawtucket Red Sox	New Britain Red Sox	Greensboro Hornets; Winter Haven Red Sox	Elmira Pioneers	—	5
1988	Pawtucket Red Sox	New Britain Red Sox	Lynchburg Red Sox; Winter Haven Red Sox	Elmira Pioneers	AZL Mariners/Red Sox (Note: In 1988, the Red Sox and Seattle Mariners shared an Arizona League rookie team.)	5(1)
1989	Pawtucket Red Sox	New Britain Red Sox	Lynchburg Red Sox; Winter Haven Red Sox	Elmira Pioneers	GCL Red Sox; DSL cooperative (Note: In 1989, the Red Sox, Baltimore Orioles, and Milwaukee Brewers shared a DSL team.)	6(1)

=== 1990–2020 ===
Minor League Baseball operated with six classes from 1990 to 2020. The Class A level was subdivided for a second time with the creation of Class A-Advanced. The Rookie level consisted of domestic and foreign circuits. During several seasons, the Red Sox fielded two teams in the Dominican Summer League (DSL).

Year	Triple-A	Double-A	Class A-Advanced	Class A	Class A Short Season	Rookie League	Foreign Rookie	No./Ref.
1990	Pawtucket Red Sox	New Britain Red Sox	Winter Haven Red Sox; Lynchburg Red Sox	—	Elmira Pioneers	GCL Red Sox	DSL cooperative (Note: In 1990, the Red Sox shared a DSL team with the Detroit Tigers and San Diego Padres.)	6(1)
1991	Pawtucket Red Sox	New Britain Red Sox	Winter Haven Red Sox; Lynchburg Red Sox	—	Elmira Pioneers	GCL Red Sox	—	6
1992	Pawtucket Red Sox	New Britain Red Sox	Winter Haven Red Sox; Lynchburg Red Sox	—	Elmira Pioneers	GCL Red Sox	—	6
1993	Pawtucket Red Sox	New Britain Red Sox	Fort Lauderdale Red Sox; Lynchburg Red Sox	—	Utica Blue Sox	GCL Red Sox	—	6
1994	Pawtucket Red Sox	New Britain Red Sox	Sarasota Red Sox; Lynchburg Red Sox	—	Utica Blue Sox	GCL Red Sox	—	6
1995	Pawtucket Red Sox	Trenton Thunder	Sarasota Red Sox	Michigan Battle Cats	Utica Blue Sox	GCL Red Sox	—	6
1996	Pawtucket Red Sox	Trenton Thunder	Sarasota Red Sox	Michigan Battle Cats	Lowell Spinners	GCL Red Sox	DSL cooperative (Note: In 1996, the Red Sox and Houston Astros shared a DSL team.)	6(1)
1997	Pawtucket Red Sox	Trenton Thunder	Sarasota Red Sox	Michigan Battle Cats	Lowell Spinners	GCL Red Sox	DSL Red Sox	7
1998	Pawtucket Red Sox	Trenton Thunder	Sarasota Red Sox	Michigan Battle Cats	Lowell Spinners	GCL Red Sox	DSL Red Sox	7
1999	Pawtucket Red Sox	Trenton Thunder	Sarasota Red Sox	Augusta GreenJackets	Lowell Spinners	GCL Red Sox	DSL Red Sox; VSL cooperative (Note: In 1999, the Red Sox shared a VSL team with the Chicago Cubs and Cincinnati Reds.)	7(1)
2000	Pawtucket Red Sox	Trenton Thunder	Sarasota Red Sox	Augusta GreenJackets	Lowell Spinners	GCL Red Sox	DSL Red Sox; DSL cooperative (Note: In 2000, in addition to the DSL Red Sox, the Red Sox and Arizona Diamondbacks shared a DSL team.); VSL cooperative (Note: In 2000, the Red Sox shared a VSL team with the Milwaukee Brewers and Minnesota Twins.)	7(2)
2001	Pawtucket Red Sox	Trenton Thunder	Sarasota Red Sox	Augusta GreenJackets	Lowell Spinners	GCL Red Sox	DSL Red Sox; DSL cooperative (Note: In 2001, in addition to the DSL Red Sox, the Red Sox and Cleveland Indians shared a DSL team.); VSL cooperative (Note: In 2001, the Red Sox shared a VSL team with the Milwaukee Brewers and Minnesota Twins.)	7(2)
2002	Pawtucket Red Sox	Trenton Thunder	Sarasota Red Sox	Augusta GreenJackets	Lowell Spinners	GCL Red Sox	DSL Red Sox; VSL cooperative (Note: In 2002, the Red Sox shared a VSL team with the Milwaukee Brewers.)	7(1)
2003	Pawtucket Red Sox	Portland Sea Dogs	Sarasota Red Sox	Augusta GreenJackets	Lowell Spinners	GCL Red Sox	DSL Red Sox (2 teams)	8
2004	Pawtucket Red Sox	Portland Sea Dogs	Sarasota Red Sox	Augusta GreenJackets	Lowell Spinners	GCL Red Sox	DSL Red Sox; VSL Red Sox	8
2005	Pawtucket Red Sox	Portland Sea Dogs	Wilmington Blue Rocks	Greenville Bombers	Lowell Spinners	GCL Red Sox	DSL Red Sox; VSL cooperative (Note: In 2005, the Red Sox shared a VSL team with the San Diego Padres.)	7(1)
2006	Pawtucket Red Sox	Portland Sea Dogs	Wilmington Blue Rocks	Greenville Drive	Lowell Spinners	GCL Red Sox	DSL Red Sox	7
2007	Pawtucket Red Sox	Portland Sea Dogs	Lancaster JetHawks	Greenville Drive	Lowell Spinners	GCL Red Sox	DSL Red Sox	7
2008	Pawtucket Red Sox	Portland Sea Dogs	Lancaster JetHawks	Greenville Drive	Lowell Spinners	GCL Red Sox	DSL Red Sox	7
2009	Pawtucket Red Sox	Portland Sea Dogs	Salem Red Sox	Greenville Drive	Lowell Spinners	GCL Red Sox	DSL Red Sox	7
2010	Pawtucket Red Sox	Portland Sea Dogs	Salem Red Sox	Greenville Drive	Lowell Spinners	GCL Red Sox	DSL Red Sox	7
2011	Pawtucket Red Sox	Portland Sea Dogs	Salem Red Sox	Greenville Drive	Lowell Spinners	GCL Red Sox	DSL Red Sox	7
2012	Pawtucket Red Sox	Portland Sea Dogs	Salem Red Sox	Greenville Drive	Lowell Spinners	GCL Red Sox	DSL Red Sox	7
2013	Pawtucket Red Sox	Portland Sea Dogs	Salem Red Sox	Greenville Drive	Lowell Spinners	GCL Red Sox	DSL Red Sox	7
2014	Pawtucket Red Sox	Portland Sea Dogs	Salem Red Sox	Greenville Drive	Lowell Spinners	GCL Red Sox	DSL Red Sox	7
2015	Pawtucket Red Sox	Portland Sea Dogs	Salem Red Sox	Greenville Drive	Lowell Spinners	GCL Red Sox	DSL Red Sox (2 teams)	8
2016	Pawtucket Red Sox	Portland Sea Dogs	Salem Red Sox	Greenville Drive	Lowell Spinners	GCL Red Sox	DSL Red Sox (2 teams)	8
2017	Pawtucket Red Sox	Portland Sea Dogs	Salem Red Sox	Greenville Drive	Lowell Spinners	GCL Red Sox	DSL Red Sox	7
2018	Pawtucket Red Sox	Portland Sea Dogs	Salem Red Sox	Greenville Drive	Lowell Spinners	GCL Red Sox	DSL Red Sox (2 teams)	8
2019	Pawtucket Red Sox	Portland Sea Dogs	Salem Red Sox	Greenville Drive	Lowell Spinners	GCL Red Sox	DSL Red Sox (2 teams)	8
2020	Pawtucket Red Sox	Portland Sea Dogs	Salem Red Sox	Greenville Drive	Lowell Spinners	GCL Red Sox	DSL Red Sox (2 teams)	8

For 2020, listed teams are those announced by the Red Sox prior to cancellation of the minor-league season due to the COVID-19 pandemic.

=== 2021–present ===
Prior to the 2021 season, Major League Baseball reorganized Minor League Baseball; changes included ending the Class A Short Season classification, and limiting each major league team to four affiliates above the Rookie level. Additionally, the composition and names of leagues above the Rookie level were changed.

For the Red Sox' farm system:

- The Worcester Red Sox succeeded the Pawtucket Red Sox as the Triple-A affiliate.
- The Lowell Spinners, who had been a Class A Short Season team, were dropped as an affiliate.
- The Greenville Drive and Salem Red Sox swapped relative classification levels, with Greenville moving from Single-A to "High-A", and Salem moving from Class A-Advanced to "Low-A". Low-A was reclassified as Single-A in 2022.

Year	Triple-A	Double-A	High-A	Single-A	Rookie League	Foreign Rookie	No./Ref.
2021	Worcester Red Sox	Portland Sea Dogs	Greenville Drive	Salem Red Sox	FCL Red Sox	DSL Red Sox (2 teams)	7
2022	Worcester Red Sox	Portland Sea Dogs	Greenville Drive	Salem Red Sox	FCL Red Sox	DSL Red Sox (2 teams)	7
2023	Worcester Red Sox	Portland Sea Dogs	Greenville Drive	Salem Red Sox	FCL Red Sox	DSL Red Sox (2 teams)	7
2024	Worcester Red Sox	Portland Sea Dogs	Greenville Drive	Salem Red Sox	FCL Red Sox	DSL Red Sox (2 teams)	7
2025	Worcester Red Sox	Portland Sea Dogs	Greenville Drive	Salem Red Sox	FCL Red Sox	DSL Red Sox (2 teams)	7
2026	Worcester Red Sox	Portland Sea Dogs	Greenville Drive	Salem RidgeYaks	FCL Red Sox	DSL Red Sox (2 teams)	7
