= Venezuelan Summer League Reds =

- Valencia, Carabobo
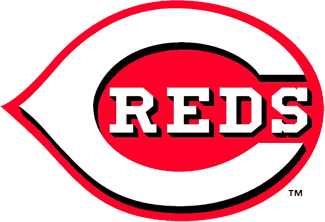

| Team logo | Cap insignia |

Minor league affiliations
- Class: Rookie
- League: Venezuelan Summer League

Major league affiliations
- Team: Cincinnati Reds

Team data
- Name: Venezuelan Summer League Reds
- Owner/ Operator: Cincinnati Reds

The Venezuelan Summer League Reds was a Minor League Baseball affiliated team of the Cincinnati Reds most recently based in the city of Valencia, Carabobo in Venezuela. The Reds had an affiliated relationship with teams in the Venezuelan Summer League (VSL) played from 1999 to 2011. In 2002, the Reds shared an affiliate team, VSL Cagua, with the Minnesota Twins that played in Cagua, Aragua. The following year, the Reds shared VSL Cagua with the Milwaukee Brewers. The team in Cagua became solely a Reds affiliate in 2004, then was renamed VSL Reds in 2005. In 2007, the Reds entered a new working agreement with the Tampa Bay Devil Rays, sharing an affiliate in Guacara, Carabobo. After not having a VSL affiliate for two seasons, the VSL Reds returned in 2010 and 2011.

The VSL folded in early 2016.

== Notable players ==
The following VSL Reds players who were signed with the Reds later played in Major League Baseball:

- Alejandro Chacín (2010)
- Miguel Rojas (2006–2007)
- Ronald Torreyes (2010)

== See also ==
- Venezuelan Summer League Reds players
- List of Cincinnati Reds minor league affiliates
