= Dominican Summer League Red Sox =

- Founded in 1997

Minor league affiliations
- Class: Rookie
- League: Dominican Summer League
- Division: North (DSL Red Sox Red); North (DSL Red Sox Blue)

Major league affiliations
- Team: Boston Red Sox

Minor league titles
- League titles (2): 2016; 2024

Team data
- Name: Red Sox
- Ballpark: El Toro Complex carr. Mella KM 23.5, El Toro, DR
- Owner/ Operator: Boston Red Sox
- General manager: José Zapata (field coordinator)
- Manager: Amaury García & Sandy Madera

The Dominican Summer League Red Sox, often called the DSL Red Sox, (Note: Not to be confused with the defunct VSL Red Sox.) are a Minor League Baseball affiliate of the Boston Red Sox of Major League Baseball, playing in the foreign Dominican Summer League. The team, classed as a Rookie League franchise, plays at the El Toro Complex in the Dominican Republic.

For the 2021 Boston Red Sox season, the field coordinator is José Zapata, and the Red Sox are fielding two teams; one managed by Ozzie Chavez and the other managed by Sandy Madera.

== History ==
The Red Sox have fielded at least one team in the DSL each season since 1996; the team that season was a cooperative with the Houston Astros. Since 1997, the Red Sox have fielded their own team. In some seasons, the Red Sox have fielded two teams in the league. This first occurred in 2003, when the Venezuelan general strike of 2002–03 impacted the Venezuelan Summer League, where the Red Sox also had an affiliate. The Red Sox have fielded two DSL teams each season since 2015, except for 2017. When two teams are fielded, they are distinguished by the suffixes 1 and 2, or Blue and Red (e.g. DSL Red Sox 1). In 2022, both Red Sox teams competed in the same division.

The Red Sox fielded a cooperative team with one or more other MLB clubs several times: 1989 with the Baltimore Orioles and Milwaukee Brewers; 1990 with the Detroit Tigers and San Diego Padres; 1996 with the Astros; 2000 with the Arizona Diamondbacks; and 2001 with the Cleveland Indians.

The DSL Red Sox reached the league championship series in 2014, and DSL Red Sox 1 won the league championship series in 2016.

Notable alumni include Hanley Ramírez, who played with the team in 2001, Xander Bogaerts, who hit .314 with the team during the 2010 season, and Rafael Devers, who hit .337 with the team during the 2014 season.

== Results by year ==
=== Cooperative teams ===
| Year | Team | Division | Manager | W–L Record | Finish | Postseason |
|---|---|---|---|---|---|---|
| Red Sox/Orioles/Brewers | | | 16–39 | | | |
| Tigers/Padres/Red Sox | | | 8–62 | | | |
| 1996 | Astros/Red Sox | San Pedro de Macoris | Rick Aponte | 29–39 | 4th of 7 | |
| 2000 | Diamondbacks/Red Sox | San Pedro de Macoris | | 15–55 | 9th of 10 | |
| 2001 | Indians/Red Sox | Santo Domingo West | | 25–43 | 8th of 8 | |

=== Red Sox teams ===
| Year | Team | Division | Manager | W–L Record | Finish | Postseason |
|---|---|---|---|---|---|---|
| 1997 | Red Sox | San Pedro de Macoris | Nelson Norman | 25–46 | | |
| 1998 | Red Sox | San Pedro de Macoris | Nelson Norman | 37–30 | | |
| 1999 | Red Sox | San Pedro de Macoris | Nelson Norman | 30–40 | | |
| 2000 | Red Sox | San Pedro de Macoris | Nelson Norman | 30–40 | | |
| 2001 | Red Sox | San Pedro de Macoris | Guadalupe Jabalera | 28–42 | | |
| 2002 | Red Sox | Santo Domingo East | Nelson Norman | 41–31 | | lost to DSL Phillies |
| 2003 | Red Sox 1 | Santo Domingo East | Nelson Paulino | 28–38 | | |
| 2003 | Red Sox 2 | Santo Domingo North | | 23–44 | | |
| 2004 | Red Sox | Santo Domingo East - American | Nelson Paulino | 33–35 | | |
| 2005 | Red Sox | Boca Chica - American | Nelson Paulino | 26–42 | 3rd of 4 | |
| 2006 | Red Sox | Boca Chica - American | Nelson Paulino | 23–47 | 3rd of 3 | |
| 2007 | Red Sox | Boca Chica North | José Zapata | 38–31 | 4th of 8 | |
| 2008 | Red Sox | Boca Chica South | José Zapata | 43–27 | 3rd of 12 | |
| 2009 | Red Sox | Boca Chica North | José Zapata | 44–25 | 3rd of 12 | |
| 2010 | Red Sox | Boca Chica North | José Zapata | 37–35 | 5th (tie) of 12 | |
| 2011 | Red Sox | Boca Chica North | José Zapata | 38–33 | 4th of 9 | |
| 2012 | Red Sox | Boca Chica North | José Zapata | 41–29 | 4th of 6 | |
| 2013 | Red Sox | Boca Chica Northwest | José Zapata | 46–24 | 1st of 8 | lost in semi-finals to DSL Rangers |
| 2014 | Red Sox | Boca Chica South | José Zapata | 50–19 | 1st of 10 | lost in finals to DSL Rangers 1 |
| 2015 | Red Sox 1 | Boca Chica South | José Zapata | 28–44 | 8th of 10 | |
| 2015 | Red Sox 2 | San Pedro de Macoris | Aly González | 45–27 | 1st (tie) of 5 | lost in quarterfinals to DSL Yankees 1 |
| 2016 | Red Sox 1 | Northwest | José Zapata | 50–18 | 1st of 8 | won league championship |
| 2016 | Red Sox 2 | Northeast | Aly González | 47–22 | 1st of 6 | lost in semi-finals to DSL Rangers |
| 2017 | Red Sox | Northwest | Aly González | 47–24 | 1st (tie) of 8 | lost in quarterfinals to DSL Dodgers 1 |
| 2018 | Red Sox 1 | Northwest | Aly González | 30–41 | 6th (tie) of 8 | |
| 2018 | Red Sox 2 | North | Fernando Tatís | 33–38 | 5th of 8 | |
| 2019 | Red Sox 1 | Northwest | Ozzie Chavez | 38–33 | 4th of 8 | |
| 2019 | Red Sox 2 | North | Fernando Tatís | 31–39 | 6th of 8 | |
| 2020 | Red Sox Blue | — | Ozzie Chavez | Season cancelled, COVID-19 pandemic | | |
| 2020 | Red Sox Red | — | Sandy Madera | Season cancelled, COVID-19 pandemic | | |
| 2021 | Red Sox Blue | North | Ozzie Chavez | 44–16 | 1st of 8 | lost in semi-finals to DSL Rockies |
| 2021 | Red Sox Red | North | Sandy Madera | 36–23 | 2nd of 8 | |

Notes:

- Finish position is within the team's division.
- Records of the 1997 through 2004 seasons are incomplete on Baseball-Reference.com.

== Roster ==
Dominican Summer League Red Sox Blue roster
| Players | Coaches/Other |
|---|---|
| Pitchers: 38 Jainer Almanza; 13 Wascar Berroa; 30 Yander Bonaci; 37 Rony Calderon; 57 Ranci Castillo; 66 Yomar De La Rosa; 47 Sabdiel Delzine; 22 Juanyerlin Duran; 29 Erickson Ettien; 41 Carlos Falcon; 58 Alexander Heredia; 32 Angelo Ladera; 71 Angel Lopez; -- Francisco Machado ‡; 51 Michael Manjarres; 54 Dani Richar; 31 Oscar Vaamonde; 68 Yariel Valdez; Catchers: 59 Lester Suarez; 55 Andruw Zambrano; Infielders: 35 Eliezer Alfonzo; 3 Christopher Alvarado; 49 Louis Andujar; 2 Edwin Darville; 12 Diomar Hidalgo; 17 Hector Ramos; 60 Yoiber Ruiz; Outfielders: 53 Josue Brito; 18 Stiven De La Cruz; 64 Emmanuel Figuereo; 48 Jostin Ogando; 11 Harold Rivas; 15 Dorian Soto; 36 Maikol Tovar | Manager: -- Amaury Garcia; Coaches: -- Oscar Lira (pitching); -- Claudio Sanchez (coach); -- Eider Torres (hitting); -- Leonel Vasquez (pitching); 7-day injured list; * On Boston Red Sox 40-man roster; ~ Development list; # Rehab assignment; ∞ Reserve list; ‡ Restricted list; § Suspended list; † Temporarily inactive list; Roster updated November 7, 2025; Transactions; → More rosters: MiLB • Dominican Summer League; → Boston Red Sox minor league players |

Dominican Summer League Red Sox Red roster
| Players | Coaches/Other |
|---|---|
| Pitchers: 40 Jose Alexandro; 54 Felix Belisario; 15 Christopher Cordero; 62 Breylin Cruz; 66 Isael Fis; 57 Jakson Gamboa; 32 Jose Golindano; 51 Allan Griman; 60 Jesus Martinez; 59 Williams Montero; 31 Robert Moreno; 43 Berny Ortiz; 37 Leosmar Perez; 55 Eddison Septimo; 30 Charlie Zink; Catchers: 51 Kevin Morillo; 7 Franklin Primera; 12 Miguel Rivera; Infielders: 2 Luis Aular; 22 Jhorman Bravo; 3 Miguel Welch; Outfielders: 16 Alexander Alzi; 24 Gustavo Antunez; 58 Geomaikel Martinez; 44 Jhonny Osta; 5 Givian Sirvania; 11 Krishan Ulacio; 28 Adrian Valdez | Manager: -- Sandy Madera; Coaches: -- Rafael Feliz (pitching); -- Juan Hernandez (coach); -- Edwin Rodriguez (hitting); -- Carlos Vallejo (coach); 7-day injured list; * On Boston Red Sox 40-man roster; ~ Development list; # Rehab assignment; ∞ Reserve list; ‡ Restricted list; § Suspended list; † Temporarily inactive list; Roster updated December 11, 2025; Transactions; → More rosters: MiLB • Dominican Summer League; → Boston Red Sox minor league players |

== See also ==
- Notable DSL Red Sox players
