= Bolivarian National Baseball League =

- Sport: Baseball
- Founded: 2005; 21 years ago
- Folded: 2019; 7 years ago
- No. of teams: 13 (2019)
- Country: Venezuela
- Last champion: Cacaoteros de Miranda (2019)
- Most titles: Cacaoteros de Miranda (4 titles)

The Liga Nacional Bolivariana de Béisbol (LNBB, English: Bolivarian National Baseball League), commonly referred to as the Liga Bolivariana (lit. Bolivarian League), was a semi-professional baseball league that operated in Venezuela from 2005 to 2019. Unlike the top-level Venezuelan Professional Baseball League, the LNBB season was played during the summer, for players not affiliated with American organized baseball (i.e. those playing in the Venezuelan Summer League).

The league was founded in February 2005 by President Hugo Chávez, and was sponsored by the Venezuelan government as well as the state-owned oil giant PDVSA. Critics referred to it as the "Chávez League," due to its close association with the Chavista regime. At its height, the league saw the participation of up to 20 teams in 19 states of country's 23 states. In 2019, it ceased its activities due to financial problems, during the prolonged economic crisis in Venezuela.

== Winners ==
| Year | Team |
|---|---|
| 2005 | (Portuguesa (Venezuela)) Lanceros de Portuguesa |
| 2006 | (Portuguesa (Venezuela)) Lanceros de Portuguesa |
| 2007 | (Lara, Venezuela) Rojos de Lara |
| 2008 | (Lara, Venezuela) Rojos de Lara |
| 2009 | (Sucre, Venezuela) Guerreros de Sucre |
| 2010 | (Anzoátegui) Pioneros del Tigre |
| 2011 | (Barinas, Venezuela) Petroleros de Barinas |
| 2012 | (Barinas, Venezuela) Petroleros de Barinas |
| 2013 | (Cojedes, Venezuela) Criollitos de Tinaquillo |
| 2014 | (Trujillo (state)) Trujillanos BBC |
| 2015 | (Sucre, Venezuela) Guerreros de Sucre |
| 2016 | (Miranda (state)) Cacaoteros de Miranda |
| 2017 | (Miranda (state)) Cacaoteros de Miranda |
| 2018 | (Miranda (state)) Cacaoteros de Miranda |
| 2019 | (Miranda (state)) Cacaoteros de Miranda |
