= Dominican Summer League Reds =

- Boca Chica
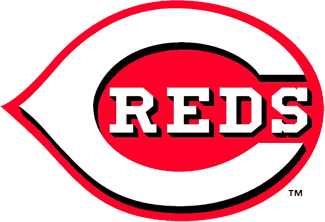

Team logo	Cap insignia

Minor league affiliations
- Class: Rookie
- League: Dominican Summer League
- Division: Boca Chica Baseball City

Major league affiliations
- Team: Cincinnati Reds

Minor league titles
- League titles (0): None

Team data
- Name: Reds
- Ballpark: Baseball City Complex
- Owner(s)/ Operator(s): Cincinnati Reds
- Manager: Luis Saturria

The Dominican Summer League Reds are a minor league baseball team of the Dominican Summer League. They are located in Boca Chica, Santo Domingo, Dominican Republic, and play their home games at Ciudad de Baseball. The team plays in the Boca Chica Baseball City division and is affiliated with the Cincinnati Reds.

== Roster ==
Dominican Summer League Reds roster
Players		Coaches/Other
Pitchers: -- Starlin Alberto; 15 Jhan Almeida; 21 Johan Cabeza; -- Jesus Colina; 41 Mauricio Colmenares; -- Ariel De La Cruz; 26 Bryan Diaz; 35 Oniel Diaz; 29 Rafael Leon; 44 Christian Lopez; -- Irvin Machuca; 52 Franyer Mendez; 36 Ryjeteri Merite; -- Ayendy Pena; 31 Samuel Perez; 43 Nicola Prodanovic; 34 Cesar Rivera; 49 Sebastian Salazar; 56 Bryan Salgado; 29 Mendry Solano; 55 Stharlin Torres; 32 Andre Vasquez; 50 Sergio Villa; 45 Deivi Villafana; 17 Carlos Zambrano	Catchers: 16 Gabriel Gomes; 40 Qyshawn Legito; 28 Angelo Mora; 3 Jirvin Morillo; Infielders: -- Liberts Aponte; 9 Anielson Buten; 51 Ichiro Cano; 19 Hansel Jimenez; 57 Yael Romero; 19 Rafhlmil Torres; 25 Anthuan Valencia; 2 Diorland Zambrano; Outfielders: 48 Adolfo Sanchez; 7 Yeycol Soriano	Manager: -- Jose Montilla; Coaches: -- Aaron Bond (defensive); -- Cesar Garcia (pitching); -- Takashi Miyoshi (defensive); -- Luis Terrero (hitting); 7-day injured list * On Cincinnati Reds 40-man roster ~ Development list # Rehab assignment ∞ Reserve list ‡ Restricted list § Suspended list † Temporarily inactive list Roster updated February 4, 2025; Transactions → More rosters: MiLB • Dominican Summer League → Cincinnati Reds minor league players
