= Nelson Paulino =

Boston Red Sox – No. 88
- Infielder / Coach
- Born: January 23, 1973 (age 53); Salcedo, Hermanas Mirabal, Dominican Republic
- Bats: Switch Throws: Right
- Stats at Baseball Reference

Nelson Rafael Paulino (born January 23, 1973) is a former minor league infielder and current hitting coach in the Boston Red Sox minor league system. Listed at 5 feet 11 inches (1.80 m) and 155 pounds (70 kg), he was a switch hitter and threw right handed.

== Career ==
Paulino started his professional career with the Atlanta Braves organization, playing for them at three different minor league levels from 1992 through 1994. He played all four infield positions, mostly as a second baseman, and posted a combined average of .233 with four home runs and 47 runs batted in in 237 games.

He then started a long association with the Red Sox organization in 1998, working for them in the Dominican Summer League with the DSL Red Sox team, first as a scout (1998–2000), later as their hitting coach (2001–2002), manager (2003–2006), and bench coach (2007), before returning to his hitting coach duties (2008–2011).

In 2012, Paulino was named the hitting coach for the Low-A Lowell Spinners, and was promoted to the High-A Salem Red Sox in 2013. Paulino then served as hitting coach for Boston's Single-A affiliate, the Greenville Drive, in 2014 and 2015, and filled the same role for Salem in 2016 through 2018. Paulino was back with Greenville in 2019, and was again assigned to Salem for the 2020 season, which was later cancelled due to the COVID-19 pandemic. He returned to Salem for 2021, with the team now at the Single-A level as part of MLB's reorganization of the minor leagues.

On April 27, 2026, Paulino was named as the interim hitting coach for the Boston Red Sox following the firing of the majority of the major league coaching staff.
