= Venezuelan Summer League =

Defunct baseball league in Venezuela

- Sport: Baseball
- Founded: 1997; 29 years ago
- Folded: 2015; 11 years ago
- No. of teams: First season: 6; Maximum: 10; Final season: 4
- Country: Venezuela
- Last champion: VSL Tigers (2015)

The Venezuelan Summer League (VSL) was a professional baseball league that operated in Venezuela from 1997 to 2015, primarily in the state of Carabobo. Teams in the league served as academies for Major League Baseball (MLB) organizations, and were classified at the Rookie League level within Minor League Baseball.

== History ==
The VSL was created in 1997 as an alternative to the Dominican Summer League (DSL) to improve the development of young prospects from Venezuela in their early years in organized baseball. Besides Carabobo, the states of Aragua, Lara and Yaracuy were represented in the league.

Each team had a roster limit of 35 active players, at least 10 of which had to be pitchers. No player on the active list could have more than four years of minor league service. There were no age limits. The league was closed to all MLB draft eligible players; that is, players from the United States, Canada and Puerto Rico. Exceptions were made for two players from Puerto Rico. In addition to Venezuela, players in the league came from Argentina, Colombia, Curaçao, Dominican Republic, El Salvador, Mexico, Nicaragua, Panama, and Sint Maarten.

The regular season champion and runner-up played a best-of-three-games playoff series for the league championship.

The league had six squads in its first season, 1997, via three teams fielding split-squads. By 1999, the league had grown to 10 individual teams, and had nine teams as late as 2007. The league reduced to four teams in 2012, played the next two seasons with five teams, and was again reduced to four teams in 2015. Political instability in the region led to more teams opting out before the 2016 season, resulting in the league shutting down.

After the suspension of the VSL, the semi-pro Bolivarian League remained as the only summer league in Venezuela (though that would cease operations in 2019). Venezuela would go without a fully-professional summer baseball league until 2021, when the Venezuelan Major League was established.

== Teams ==
=== 1997–2004 ===
Teams during this period were named for the city they operated in.

==== Single-squad teams ====
Team	City	MLB Affiliation	Year(s)
VSL Aguirre	Aguirre, Carabobo	Seattle Mariners & Colorado Rockies; Seattle Mariners	2001; 2002–2004
VSL Cabudare	Cabudare, Lara	Baltimore Orioles & Texas Rangers; Baltimore Orioles & Texas Rangers & St. Louis Cardinals; Baltimore Orioles	1999, 2001; 2000; 2002
VSL Cagua	Cagua, Aragua	Chicago Cubs & Cincinnati Reds & Boston Red Sox; Cincinnati Reds & Montreal Expos; Cincinnati Reds & Minnesota Twins; Cincinnati Reds & Milwaukee Brewers; Cincinnati Reds	1999; 2000–2001; 2002; 2003; 2004
VSL Carora	Carora, Lara	St. Louis Cardinals & Toronto Blue Jays	2001–2002
VSL Chino Canónico	Barquisimeto, Lara	Toronto Blue Jays & Atlanta Braves & Cleveland Indians; Toronto Blue Jays & Atlanta Braves & St. Louis Cardinals	1999; 2000
VSL Chivacoa	Chivacoa, Yaracuy	Tampa Bay Devil Rays & Pittsburgh Pirates; Tampa Bay Devil Rays & Pittsburgh Pirates & Atlanta Braves; Pittsburgh Pirates & San Diego Padres; Pittsburgh Pirates	1999; 2000; 2001–2002; 2003
VSL Ciudad Alianza	Los Guayos, Carabobo	Houston Astros & Florida Marlins & Minnesota Twins; Florida Marlins & Chicago Cubs; Boston Red Sox & Milwaukee Brewers; Boston Red Sox	1999; 2001; 2002; 2004
VSL Cocorote	Cocorote, Yaracuy	Florida Marlins & Toronto Blue Jays	2003
VSL La Pradera	La Pradera, Mérida	New York Yankees & Seattle Mariners & Philadelphia Phillies; New York Yankees & Anaheim Angels & Houston Astros; New York Yankees & Los Angeles Dodgers & Chicago Cubs; New York Yankees & Los Angeles Dodgers	1999; 2000; 2001; 2002
VSL La Victoria	La Victoria, Aragua	Philadelphia Phillies & Milwaukee Brewers & San Francisco Giants; Philadelphia Phillies & Detroit Tigers	1999; 2000
VSL Mariara	Mariara, Carabobo	Philadelphia Phillies & Tampa Bay Devil Rays; Philadelphia Phillies	2001; 2002–2003
VSL Miranda	Miranda, Carabobo	Tampa Bay Devil Rays & Arizona Diamondbacks & Chicago White Sox	1998
VSL Montalbán	Montalbán, Carabobo	Pittsburgh Pirates & Colorado Rockies & Minnesota Twins	1998
VSL Puerto Cabello	Puerto Cabello, Carabobo	Chicago Cubs & Colorado Rockies	2002
VSL San Felipe	San Felipe, Yaracuy	Cleveland Indians & Seattle Mariners & Detroit Tigers; Cleveland Indians	1999–2000; 2001–2003
VSL San Joaquín	San Joaquín, Carabobo	St. Louis Cardinals & Los Angeles Dodgers & Montreal Expos; Milwaukee Brewers & Boston Red Sox & Minnesota Twins; Florida Marlins; Pittsburgh Pirates	1999; 2000–2001; 2002; 2004
VSL Venoco	Guacara, Carabobo	Houston Astros & Colorado Rockies; Houston Astros	2000; 2001–2003
VSL Universidad de Carabobo	Maracay, Aragua	New York Mets & Kansas City Royals & Baltimore Orioles; New York Mets & Kansas City Royals & Colorado Rockies; New York Mets & Florida Marlins; New York Mets; Florida Marlins & San Diego Padres	1998; 1999; 2000; 2001–2002; 2004
VSL Yaritagua	Yaritagua, Yaracuy	Baltimore Orioles	2003

==== Split-squad teams ====
These clubs operated as split-squads, fielding two teams denoted by numbers (e.g. VSL Venoco 1 and VSL Venoco 2).

Team	City	MLB Affiliation	Year(s)
VSL Guacara 1&2	Guacara, Carabobo	Milwaukee Brewers; San Francisco Giants; Florida Marlins	1997–1998
VSL Maracay 1&2	Maracay, Aragua	unknown	1997
VSL San Joaquín 1&2	San Joaquín, Carabobo	Los Angeles Dodgers; Houston Astros; Montreal Expos	1997–1998
VSL Tronconero 1&2	Tronconero, Carabobo	Minnesota Twins; New York Mets; Philadelphia Phillies; San Diego Padres	2003–2004
VSL Venoco 1&2	Guacara, Carabobo	Houston Astros; Baltimore Orioles	2004

=== 2005–2015 ===
Teams during this period were named for their affiliated MLB team(s).

==== Single-affiliate teams ====
Team	MLB Affiliation	City	Year(s)
VSL Astros	Houston Astros	Guacara, Carabobo	2005–2008
VSL Cardinals	St. Louis Cardinals	San Joaquín, Carabobo	2005–2010
VSL Cubs	Chicago Cubs	Los Guayos, Carabobo	2013–2015
VSL Mariners	Seattle Mariners	Aguirre, Carabobo	2005–2014
VSL Mets	New York Mets	Tronconero, Carabobo	2005–2009
VSL Orioles	Baltimore Orioles	Guacara, Carabobo	2005
VSL Phillies	Philadelphia Phillies	Tronconero, Carabobo	2005–2015
VSL Pirates	Pittsburgh Pirates	San Joaquín, Carabobo	2005–2011
VSL Rays	Tampa Bay Rays	Guacara, Carabobo	2008–2015
VSL Reds	Cincinnati Reds	Cagua, Aragua	2005–2006, 2010–2011
VSL Tigers	Detroit Tigers	Los Guayos, Carabobo	2007–2015

==== Cooperative teams ====
Note that cooperative teams are linked to their respective teams (e.g. VSL Cubs/Twins links to VSL Cubs and VSL Twins).

Team	MLB Affiliation	City	Year(s)
VSL Cubs/Twins	Chicago Cubs; Minnesota Twins	Maracay, Aragua	2007
VSL Devil Rays/Reds	Tampa Bay Devil Rays; Cincinnati Reds	Guacara, Carabobo	2007
VSL Marlins/Nationals	Florida Marlins; Washington Nationals	Maracay, Aragua	2005
VSL Orioles/White Sox	Baltimore Orioles; Chicago White Sox	Guacara, Carabobo	2006
VSL Red Sox/Padres	Boston Red Sox; San Diego Padres	Los Guayos, Carabobo	2005
VSL Tigers/Marlins	Detroit Tigers; Florida Marlins	Los Guayos, Carabobo	2006
VSL Twins/Blue Jays	Minnesota Twins; Toronto Blue Jays	Maracay, Aragua	2006

== League champions ==
- 1997 – VSL Maracay 2
- 1998 – VSL Guacara 1
- 1999 – VSL Chino Canónico
- 2000 – VSL San Felipe
- 2001 – VSL Venoco
- 2002 – VSL Aguirre
- 2003 – VSL San Felipe
- 2004 – VSL Tronconero 2
- 2005 – VSL Astros
- 2006 – VSL Phillies
- 2007 – VSL Astros
- 2008 – VSL Pirates
- 2009 – VSL Rays
- 2010 – VSL Pirates
- 2011 – VSL Rays
- 2012 – VSL Phillies
- 2013 – VSL Mariners
- 2014 – VSL Tigers
- 2015 – VSL Tigers

== MLB alumni ==
VSL players who have gone on to make MLB appearances include:

- Jose Altuve (HOU)
- José Alvarado (TBR)
- Wladimir Balentien (SEA)
- Asdrúbal Cabrera (SEA)
- Ramón Cabrera (PIT)
- Ezequiel Carrera (TOR)
- Yonny Chirinos (TBR)
- Argenis Díaz (BOS)
- Elías Díaz (PIT)
- Félix Doubront (BOS)
- Luis Durango (SDP)
- Sergio Escalona (PHI)
- Eduardo Escobar (CWS)
- Víctor Gárate (HOU)
- Avisail García (DET)
- Severino González (PHI)
- Mayckol Guaipe (SEA)
- Jesús Guzmán (SEA)
- César Hernández (PHI)
- Oscar Hernández (TBR)
- Dilson Herrera (PIT)
- Edgar Ibarra (MIN)
- Gregory Infante (CWS)
- Dixon Machado (DET)
- Jean Machi (PHI)
- Germán Márquez (TBR)
- David Martínez (HOU)
- Yoervis Medina (SEA)
- Diego Moreno (PIT)
- Omar Narváez (TBR)
- Ángel Nesbitt (DET)
- Lester Oliveros (DET)
- José Ortega (DET)
- Hernán Pérez (DET)
- Erasmo Ramírez (SEA)
- Wilking Rodríguez (TBR)
- Bruce Rondón (DET)
- Josmil Pinto (MIN)
- José Quintana (NYM)
- J. C. Ramírez (SEA)
- Felipe Rivero (TBR)
- Miguel Rojas (CIN)
- Jorge Rondón (STL)
- Rómulo Sánchez (PIT)
- Eduardo Sánchez (STL)
- Eugenio Suárez (DET)
- Rubén Tejada (NYM)
- Ronald Torreyes (CIN)
- Wilfredo Tovar (NYM)
- Luis Valbuena (SEA)
- Felipe Vázquez (TBR)
- Brayan Villarreal (DET)

Note: team affiliations reflect a player's organization while in the VSL; the player may have reached MLB with a different franchise.

== See also ==
- Venezuelan Major League
