= Los Guayos =

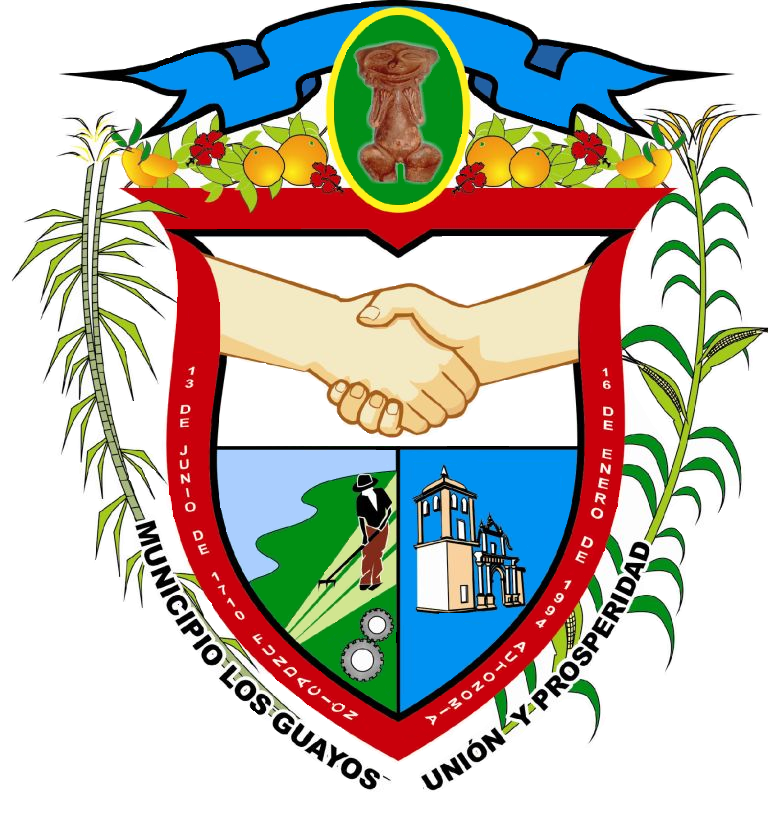
- Coat of arms

- Location within Venezuela
- Coordinates: 10°11′N 67°56′W
- Time zone: UTC−4 (VET)

Los Guayos is a town in Carabobo State, Venezuela, northwest of the Valencia Lake. It is the capital of the Los Guayos Municipality and is part of Valencia's metropolitan area.

== Etymology ==
Los Guayos owes its name to a phonetic alteration of the Indian word "uayos", a kind of rubber substance obtained from the bark of the huayales tree. This area was originally inhabited by Caribs Indians.

== Geography ==
The town of Los Guayos is part of the Los Guayos municipality. It has now almost merged with other towns in the area. The Caracas-Valencia motorway lies immediately to the North-Northeast of Los Guayos. The Los Guayos River runs from the northeast to the southeast of the town.

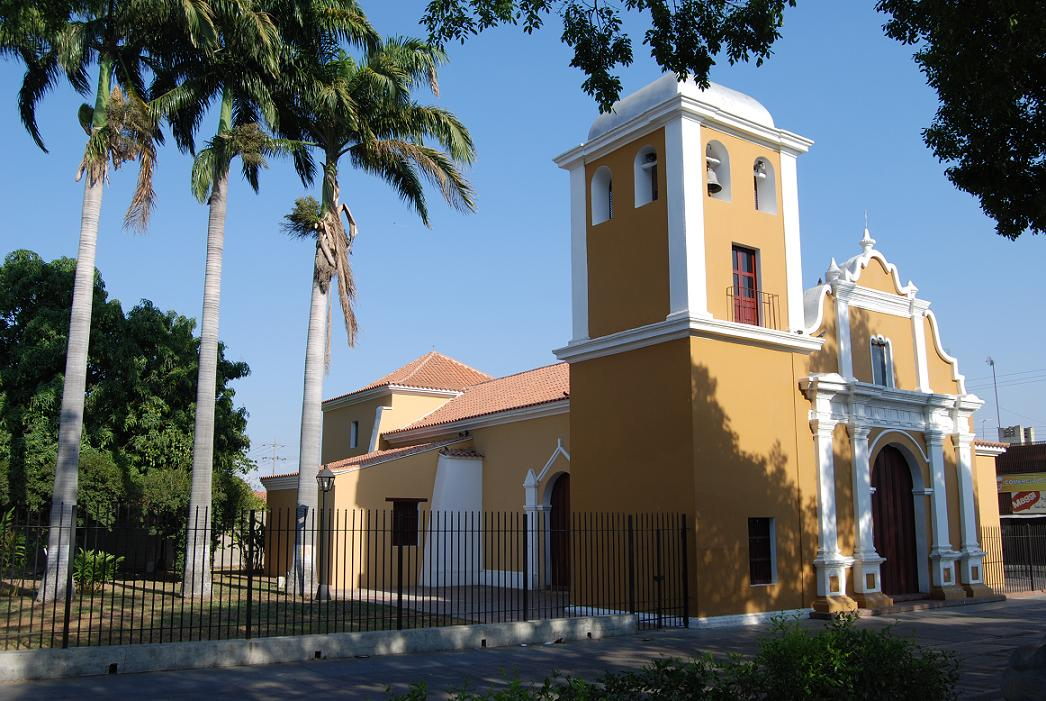
Colonial church of Los Guayos

== History ==
- On 20 February 1694, Don Francisco Berroterán, governor of Venezuela Province, declared Los Guayos a "town of Indians". The area was formerly inhabited by part of the Indian tribe of the Guayos.
- On 6 June 1710, the priest, Mariano de Martí, made Los Guayos a parish.
- In 1751, inhabitants of Los Guayos joined the national uprising led by Francisco de León against the Compañía Guipuzcoana.
- In 1812, Francisco de Miranda left a troop in the town of Los Guayos to defend the road against Spanish forces while he pursued his campaign in the Valencia region. The troop engaged in a battle with the Spaniards and was about to win the battle when one of its officers deserted to the enemy. The troop then dispersed.

== Interesting locations ==
The colonial church of San Antonio de Padua, or church of Los Guayos, is one of the oldest churches in Venezuela. Its first building dates back to 1650, when it was the church for the Indians of the area. The bell tower, with two adjacent areas, dates back to 1779.

== Postal code ==
- Los Guayos proper: 2003
- Vivienda Popular Los Guayos: 2001

== See also ==
- List of cities and towns in Venezuela
