= List of Binibining Pilipinas titleholders =

The following are the Binibining Pilipinas titleholders throughout the years, including the highlights of their performance in Big Four and other beauty pageants.

Number of wins under Binibining Pilipinas
Pageant	Wins
Miss Universe	4
Miss World	0
Miss International	5
Miss Supranational	1
Miss Grand International	0
Miss Intercontinental	2
The Miss Globe	2
Miss Tourism International (Macau)	2
Miss Tourism International (Turkey)	1
Miss Tourism International (Black Sea)	1
Miss Tourism Queen International	1
Miss Globe International	1
Miss Young International	0
Miss Maja International	0

== Titles ==
Note that the year designates the time Binibining Pilipinas has acquired that particular pageant franchise.

Current Franchises
Membership	Year
Miss International	1968 – Present
The Miss Globe	2015 – Present
Former Franchises
Membership	Year
Miss Universe	1964 – 2019
Miss World	1992 – 2010
Miss Supranational	2012 – 2019
Miss Grand International	2013, 2015 – 2022
Miss Intercontinental	2014 – 2022
Miss Tourism Queen International	2011 – 2014
Miss Maja International	1973 – 1992, 1995, 2004
Miss Young International	1970 – 1985
Special Titles
Title	Year
Miss Tourism	1987 – 1990, 1993 – 1994, 2005
Miss Press Photography	1984
Miss World Peace	1973

== Titleholders ==
Year	Winners	Runners-Up	International Placements	Ref.
2026	Binibining Pilipinas International; Gwendoline Meliz Soriano Binibining Pilipinas Globe; Sasha Juli-Belle Lacuna	1st Runner-Up; Julianne Raine Antonio 2nd Runner-Up; Tracy Mae Sunio	Miss International 2027; Gwendoline Meliz Soriano (TBD) The Miss Globe 2026; Sasha Juli-Belle Lacuna (Top 11)	
2025	Binibining Pilipinas International; Katrina Anne Johnson Binibining Pilipinas Globe; Annabelle Mae McDonnell	1st Runner-Up; Dalia Varde Khattab 2nd Runner-Up; Kathleen Enid Espenido	Miss International 2026; Katrina Anne Johnson (TBD) The Miss Globe 2025; Annabelle Mae McDonnell (Top 11)	
2024	Binibining Pilipinas International; Myrna Esguerra Binibining Pilipinas Globe; Jasmin Bungay	1st Runner-Up; Christal Jean de la Cruz 2nd Runner-Up; Trisha Martinez	Miss International 2025; Myrna Esguerra (4th Runner-Up) The Miss Globe 2024; Jasmin Bungay (2nd Runner-Up)	
2023	Binibining Pilipinas International; Angelica Lopez Binibining Pilipinas Globe; Anna Lakrini	1st Runner-Up; Katrina Anne Johnson 2nd Runner-Up; Atasha Reign Parani	Miss International 2024; Angelica Lopez (Unplaced) The Miss Globe 2023; Anna Lakrini (2nd Runner-Up)	
2022	Binibining Pilipinas International; Nicole Borromeo Binibining Pilipinas Grand International; Roberta Angela Tamondong Binibining Pilipinas Intercontinental; Gabrielle Camille Basiano Binibining Pilipinas Globe; Chelsea Lovely Fernandez	1st Runner-Up Herlene Nicole Budol 2nd Runner-Up; Stacey Daniella Gabriel	Miss International 2023; Nicole Borromeo (3rd Runner-Up) Miss Grand International 2022; Roberta Angela Tamondong (5th Runner-Up) Miss Intercontinental 2022; Gabrielle Camille Basiano (Top 20) The Miss Globe 2022; Chelsea Lovely Fernandez (Top 15) Miss Planet International 2022; Herlene Nicole Budol (Withdrew)	
2021	Binibining Pilipinas International; Hannah Arnold Binibining Pilipinas Grand International; Samantha Alexandra Panlilio Binibining Pilipinas Intercontinental; Cinderella Faye Obeñita Binibining Pilipinas Globe; Maureen Ann Montagne	1st Runner-Up Gabrielle Camille Basiano 2nd Runner-Up; Meiji Cruz	Miss International 2022; Hannah Arnold (Top 15) Miss Grand International 2021; Samantha Alexandra Panlilio (Unplaced) Miss Intercontinental 2021; Cinderella Faye Obeñita (Winner) The Miss Globe 2021; Maureen Ann Montagne (Winner) Miss CosmoWorld 2022; Meiji Cruz (Winner)	
2020	Binibining Pilipinas Grand International; Samantha Mae Bernardo (Appointed)		Miss Grand International 2020; Samantha Mae Bernardo (1st Runner-Up)	
2019	Miss Universe Philippines; Gazini Christiana Jordi Ganados Binibining Pilipinas International; Bea Patricia Magtanong Binibining Pilipinas Supranational; Resham Saeed Binibining Pilipinas Grand International; Samantha Ashley Lo (Resigned); Maria Andrea Abesamis (Assumed title, replacing Lo) Binibining Pilipinas Intercontinental; Emma Mary Tiglao Binibining Pilipinas Globe; Leren Mae Bautista	1st Runner-Up Maria Andrea Abesamis (Assumed Bb. Pilipinas–Grand International 2019) Samantha Mae Bernardo (Replaced Abesamis; Appointed Bb. Pilipinas–Grand International 2020) 2nd Runner-Up; Samantha Mae Bernardo (Assumed 1st Runner-Up)	Miss Universe 2019; Gazini Christiana Jordi Ganados (Top 20) Miss International 2019; Bea Patricia Magtanong (Top 8) Miss Supranational 2019; Resham Saeed (Top 25) Miss Grand International 2019; Samantha Ashley Lo (Unplaced) Miss Intercontinental 2019; Emma Mary Tiglao (Top 20) The Miss Globe 2019; Leren Mae Bautista (2nd Runner-Up)	
2018	Miss Universe Philippines; Catriona Gray Binibining Pilipinas International; Maria Ahtisa Manalo Binibining Pilipinas Supranational; Jehza Mae Huelar Binibining Pilipinas Grand International; Eva Psychee Patalinjug Binibining Pilipinas Intercontinental; Karen Juanita Gallman Binibining Pilipinas Globe; Michele Theresa Gumabao	1st Runner-Up; Vickie Marie Milagrosa Rushton 2nd Runner-Up; Samantha Mae Bernardo	Miss Universe 2018; Catriona Gray (Winner) Miss International 2018; Maria Ahtisa Manalo (1st Runner-Up) Miss Supranational 2018; Jehza Mae Huelar (Top 10) Miss Grand International 2018; Eva Psychee Patalinjug (Unplaced) Miss Intercontinental 2018; Karen Juanita Gallman (Winner) The Miss Globe 2018; Michele Theresa Gumabao (Top 15)	
2017	Miss Universe Philippines; Rachel Louise Peters Binibining Pilipinas International; Maria Angelica De Leon Binibining Pilipinas Supranational; Chanel Olive Thomas Binibining Pilipinas Grand International; Elizabeth Clenci Binibining Pilipinas Intercontinental; Katarina Sonja Rodriguez Binibining Pilipinas Globe; Nelda Dorothea Ibe	1st Runner-Up; Charmaine Elima 2nd Runner-Up; Kristel Guelos	Miss Universe 2017; Rachel Louise Peters (Top 10) Miss International 2017; Maria Angelica De Leon (Unplaced) Miss Supranational 2017; Chanel Olive Thomas (Top 10) Miss Grand International 2017; Elizabeth Clenci (2nd Runner-Up) Miss Intercontinental 2017; Katarina Sonja Rodriguez (1st Runner-Up) The Miss Globe 2017; Nelda Dorothea Ibe (1st Runner-Up)	
2016	Miss Universe Philippines; Maria Mika Maxine Medina Binibining Pilipinas International; Kylie Verzosa Binibining Pilipinas Supranational; Joanna Louise Eden Binibining Pilipinas Grand International; Nicole Cordoves Binibining Pilipinas Intercontinental; Jennifer Ruth Hammond Binibining Pilipinas Globe; Nichole Marie Manalo	1st Runner-Up; Angelica Alita 2nd Runner-Up; Jehza Mae Huelar	Miss Universe 2016; Maria Mika Maxine Medina (Top 6) Miss International 2016; Kylie Verzosa (Winner) Miss Supranational 2016; Joanna Louise Eden (Top 25) Miss Grand International 2016; Nicole Cordoves (1st Runner-Up) Miss Intercontinental 2016; Jennifer Ruth Hammond (Top 15) The Miss Globe 2016; Nichole Marie Manalo (3rd Runner-Up)	
2015	Miss Universe Philippines; Pia Wurtzbach Binibining Pilipinas International; Janicel Lubina Binibining Pilipinas Supranational; Rogelie Catacutan Binibining Pilipinas Intercontinental; Christi Lynn McGarry Binibining Pilipinas Tourism; Ann Lorraine Colis (became the first Binibining Pilipinas Globe)	1st Runner-Up; Hannah Ruth Sison 2nd Runner-Up; Kimverlyn Suiza	Miss Universe 2015; Pia Wurtzbach (Winner) Miss International 2015; Janicel Lubina (Top 10) Miss Supranational 2015; Rogelie Catacutan (Top 20) Miss Intercontinental 2015; Christi Lynn McGarry (1st Runner-Up) The Miss Globe 2015; Ann Lorraine Colis (Winner) Miss Grand International 2015; Parul Shah (3rd Runner-Up)	
2014	Miss Universe Philippines; Mary Jean Lastimosa Binibining Pilipinas International; Mary Anne Bianca Guidotti Binibining Pilipinas Supranational; Yvethe Marie Santiago Binibining Pilipinas Intercontinental; Kris Tiffany Janson Binibining Pilipinas Tourism; Parul Shah (became the first Binibining Pilipinas Grand International)	1st Runner-Up; Laura Victoria Lehmann 2nd Runner-Up; Hannah Ruth Sison	Miss Universe 2014; Mary Jean Lastimosa (Top 10) Miss International 2014; Mary Anne Bianca Guidotti (Unplaced) Miss Supranational 2014; Yvethe Marie Santiago (Top 20) Miss Intercontinental 2014; Kris Tiffany Janson (2nd Runner-Up) Miss Tourism Queen International 2014; Parul Shah (Pageant was cancelled)	
2013	Miss Universe Philippines; Ariella Arida Binibining Pilipinas International; Bea Rose Santiago Binibining Pilipinas Supranational; Mutya Johanna Datul Binibining Pilipinas Tourism; Joanna Cindy Miranda	1st Runner-Up; Pia Wurtzbach	Miss Universe 2013; Ariella Arida (3rd Runner-Up) Miss International 2013; Bea Rose Santiago (Winner) Miss Supranational 2013; Mutya Johanna Datul (Winner) Miss Tourism Queen International 2013; Joanna Cindy Miranda (Top 10) Miss Grand International 2013; Annalie Forbes (3rd Runner-Up)	
2012	Miss Universe Philippines; Janine Mari Tugonon Binibining Pilipinas International; Nicole Cassandra Schmitz Binibining Pilipinas Tourism; Katrina Jayne Dimaranan	1st Runner-Up; Elaine Kay Moll (became the first Binibining Pilipinas Supranational) 2nd Runner-Up; Annalie Forbes	Miss Universe 2012; Janine Mari Tugonon (1st Runner-Up) Miss International 2012; Nicole Cassandra Schmitz (Top 15) Miss Tourism Queen International 2012; Katrina Jayne Dimaranan (Pageant was cancelled) Miss Supranational 2012; Elaine Kay Moll (3rd Runner-Up)	
2011	Binibining Pilipinas Universe; Shamcey Supsup Binibining Pilipinas International; Dianne Elaine Necio Binibining Pilipinas Tourism; Isabella Angela Manjon	1st Runner-Up; Janine Mari Tugonon 2nd Runner-Up; Mary Jean Lastimosa	Miss Universe 2011; Shamcey Supsup (3rd Runner-Up) Miss International 2011; Dianne Elaine Necio (Top 15) Miss Tourism Queen International 2011; Isabella Angela Manjon (Unplaced)	
2010	Binibining Pilipinas Universe; Maria Venus Raj Binibining Pilipinas World; Czarina Catherine Gatbonton Binibining Pilipinas International; Krista Eileen Kleiner	1st Runner-Up; Dianne Elaine Necio 2nd Runner-Up; Helen Nicolette Henson	Miss Universe 2010; Maria Venus Raj (4th Runner-Up) Miss World 2010; Czarina Catherine Gatbonton (Unplaced) Miss International 2010; Krista Eileen Kleiner (Top 15)	
2009	Binibing Pilipinas Universe; Pamela Bianca Manalo Binibining Pilipinas World; Marie-Ann Umali Binibining Pilipinas International; Melody Adelheid Gersbach^{†}	1st Runner-Up; Richell Angalot 2nd Runner-Up; Regina Hahn	Miss Universe 2009; Pamela Bianca Manalo (Unplaced) Miss World 2009; Marie-Ann Umali (Unplaced) Miss International 2009; Melody Adelheid Gersbach^{†} (Top 15)	
2008	Binibing Pilipinas Universe; Jennifer Barrientos Binibining Pilipinas World; Danielle Kirsten Castaño (Replaced San Miguel); Janina San Miguel (Resigned) Binibining Pilipinas International; Patricia Isabel Fernandez	1st Runner-Up; Danielle Kirsten Castaño (Replaced San Miguel) 2nd Runner-Up; Elizabeth Jacqueline Nacuspag	Miss Universe 2008; Jennifer Barrientos (Unplaced) Miss World 2008; Danielle Kirsten Castaño (Unplaced) Miss International 2008; Patricia Isabel Fernandez (Top 10)	
2007	Binibing Pilipinas Universe; Anna Theresa Licaros Binibining Pilipinas World; Margaret Wilson Binibining Pilipinas International; Nadia Lee Cien Shami	1st Runner-Up; Leizel Verses 2nd Runner-Up; Abigail Lesley Cruz	Miss Universe 2007; Anna Theresa Licaros (Unplaced) Miss World 2007; Margaret Wilson (Unplaced) Miss International 2007; Nadia Lee Cien Shami (Unplaced)	
2006	Binibing Pilipinas Universe; Lia Andrea Ramos Binibining Pilipinas World; Anna Maris Igpit Binibining Pilipinas International; Denille Lou Valmonte	1st Runner-Up; Rosalyn Sirikit Santiago 2nd Runner-Up; Jeanne Bernadette Bello	Miss Universe 2006; Lia Andrea Ramos (Unplaced) Miss World 2006; Anna Maris Igpit (Unplaced) Miss International 2006; Denille Lou Valmonte (Unplaced)	
2005	Binibing Pilipinas Universe; Gionna Cabrera Binibining Pilipinas World; Carlene Aguilar Binibining Pilipinas International; Precious Lara Quigaman	1st Runner-Up; Wendy Valdez (Binibining Pilipinas Tourism) 2nd Runner-Up; Melanie Ediza	Miss Universe 2005; Gionna Cabrera (Unplaced) Miss World 2005; Carlene Aguilar (Top 15) Miss International 2005; Precious Lara Quigaman (Winner)	
2004	Binibing Pilipinas Universe; Maricar Balagtas Binibining Pilipinas World; Maria Karla Bautista Binibining Pilipinas International; Margaret-Ann Bayot	1st Runner-Up; Tracy Ann Javelona 2nd Runner-Up; Princess Jasmine Tiongson	Miss Universe 2004; Maricar Balagtas (Unplaced) Miss World 2004; Maria Karla Bautista (Top 5) Miss International 2004; Margaret-Ann Bayot (Top 15)	
2003	Binibing Pilipinas Universe; Carla Gay Balingit Binibining Pilipinas World; Maria Rafaela Yunon Binibining Pilipinas International; Jhezarie Javier	1st Runner-Up; Kate Sephora Baesa 2nd Runner-Up; Noela Mae Evangelista	Miss Universe 2003; Carla Gay Balingit (Unplaced) Miss World 2003; Maria Rafaela Yunon (Top 5) Miss International 2003; Jhezarie Javier (Unplaced)	
2002	Binibing Pilipinas Universe; Karen Loren Agustin Binibining Pilipinas World; Katherine Anne Manalo Binibining Pilipinas International; Kristine Alzar	1st Runner-Up; Margaret-Ann Bayot 2nd Runner-Up; Maria Lourdes Magno	Miss Universe 2002; Karen Loren Agustin (Unplaced) Miss World 2002; Katherine Anne Manalo (Top 10) Miss International 2002; Kristine Alzar (Unplaced)	
2001	Binibing Pilipinas Universe; Zorayda Ruth Andam Binibining Pilipinas World; Gilrhea Quinzon Binibining Pilipinas International; Maricarl Tolosa	1st Runner-Up; Michelle Reyes 2nd Runner-Up; Maricar Balagtas	Miss Universe 2001; Zorayda Ruth Andam (Unplaced) Miss World 2001; Gilrhea Quinzon (Unplaced) Miss International 2001; Maricarl Tolosa (Unplaced)	
2000	Binibing Pilipinas Universe; Nina Ricci Alagao Binibining Pilipinas World; Katherine Annwen de Guzman Binibining Pilipinas International; Joanna Maria Peñaloza	1st Runner-Up; Maria Cristina Tan 2nd Runner-Up; Nicole Hofer	Miss Universe 2000; Nina Ricci Alagao (Unplaced) Miss World 2000; Katherine Annwen de Guzman (Unplaced) Miss International 2000; Joanna Maria Peñaloza (Unplaced)	
1999	Binibing Pilipinas Universe; Miriam Quiambao (Replaced Bautista); Janelle Bautista (Dethroned) Binibining Pilipinas World; Lalaine Edson (Replaced Quiambao); Miriam Quiambao (Replaced Bautista) Binibining Pilipinas International; Georgina Anne Sandico (Replaced Edson); Lalaine Edson (Replaced Quiambao)	1st Runner-Up; Michelle Arcangel 2nd Runner-Up; Joelle Marie Pelaez	Miss Universe 1999; Miriam Quiambao (1st Runner-Up) Miss World 1999; Lalaine Edson (Unplaced) Miss International 1999; Georgina Anne Sandico (Unplaced)	
1998	Binibing Pilipinas Universe; Jewel May Lobaton (Replaced Silang); Olivia Tisha Silang (Resigned) Binibining Pilipinas World; Rachel Soriano Binibining Pilipinas International; Colette Glazer	1st Runner-Up; Elsie Sicat (Replaced Lobaton); Jewel May Lobaton (Replaced Silang) 2nd Runner-Up; Esabela Cabrera (Replaced Sicat); Elsie Sicat (Replaced Lobaton)	Miss Universe 1998; Jewel May Lobaton (Unplaced) Miss World 1998; Rachel Soriano (Unplaced) Miss International 1998; Colette Glazer (Top 15)	
1997	Binibing Pilipinas Universe; Abbygale Arenas Binibining Pilipinas World; Kristine Rachel Florendo Binibining Pilipinas International; Susan Jane Ritter	1st Runner-Up; Abiele Arianne del Moral 2nd Runner-Up; Marivic Galang	Miss Universe 1997; Abbygale Arenas (Ranked 11th) Miss World 1997; Kristine Rachel Florendo (Unplaced) Miss International 1997; Susan Jane Ritter (Top 15)	
1996	Binibing Pilipinas Universe; Aileen Damiles Binibining Pilipinas World; Daisy Reyes Binibining Pilipinas International; Yedda Marie Kittilstvedt	1st Runner-Up; Maria Sovietskaya Bacud 2nd Runner-Up; Sonia Santiago	Miss Universe 1996; Aileen Damiles (Ranked 18th) Miss World 1996; Daisy Reyes (Unplaced) Miss International 1996; Yedda Marie Kittilstvedt (Top 15)	
1995	Binibing Pilipinas Universe; Joanne Santos Binibining Pilipinas World; Reham Snow Tago Binibining Pilipinas International; Gladys Andre Dueñas	1st Runner-Up; Caroline Pobre 2nd Runner-Up; Margaret Laing	Miss Universe 1995; Joanne Santos (Ranked 16th) Miss World 1995; Reham Snow Tago (Unplaced) Miss International 1995; Gladys Andre Dueñas (Top 15)	
1995	Binibining Pilipinas Maja; Tiffany Cuña	1st Runner-Up; Stephanie Lopez 2nd Runner-Up; Jacqueline Dimalanta	Miss Maja International 1995; Tiffany Cuña (Top 15)	
1994	Binibing Pilipinas Universe; Charlene Mae Gonzales Binibining Pilipinas World; Caroline Subijano Binibining Pilipinas International; Alma Concepcion Binibining Pilipinas Tourism; Sheila Marie Dizon	1st Runner-Up; Abbygale Arenas 2nd Runner-Up; Eda Calonia	Miss Universe 1994; Charlene Mae Gonzales (Top 6) Miss World 1994; Caroline Subijano (Top 10) Miss International 1994; Alma Concepcion (Top 15)	
1993	Binibing Pilipinas Universe; Melinda Joanna Gallardo Binibining Pilipinas World; Sharmaine Ruffa Gutierrez Binibining Pilipinas International; Sheela Mae Santarin Miss Tourism Pilipinas; Jenette Fernando Look of the Year Pilipinas; Ana Maria Gonzalez	1st Runner-Up; Cristina Esguerra 2nd Runner-Up; Myra Macariola	Miss Universe 1993; Melinda Joanna Gallardo (Ranked 22nd) Miss World 1993; Sharmaine Ruffa Gutierrez (2nd Runner-Up) Miss International 1993; Sheela Mae Santarin (Unplaced)	
1992	Binibing Pilipinas Universe; Elizabeth Berroya Binibining Pilipinas World; Marilen Espino Binibining Pilipinas International; Joanne Timothea Alivio Binibining Pilipinas Maja; Marina Pura Benipayo	1st Runner-Up; Hazel Huelves 2nd Runner-Up; Michelle Buan	Miss Universe 1992; Elizabeth Berroya (Ranked 36th) Miss World 1992; Marina Pura Benipayo (Unplaced); Marilen Espino (Did not compete due to illness; replaced by Benipayo) Miss International 1992; Joanne Timothea Alivio (Unplaced)	
1991	Binibing Pilipinas Universe; Maria Lourdes Gonzales (Replaced Abayari); Anjanette Abayari (Resigned; Replaced by Gonzalez) Binibining Pilipinas International; Maria Patricia Betita Binibining Pilipinas Maja; Selina Manalad (Replaced Gonzalez); Maria Lourdes Gonzalez (Replaced Abayari)	1st Runner-Up; Jenette Fernando (Replaced Manalad); Selina Manalad (Replaced Gonzalez) 2nd Runner-Up; Anna Marie Torres (Replaced Fernando); Jenette Fernando (Replaced Manalad)	Miss Universe 1991; Maria Lourdes Gonzales (Ranked 31st) Miss International 1991; Maria Patricia Betita (Top 15) Miss Maja International 1991; Selina Manalad (Unplaced)	
1990	Binibing Pilipinas Universe; Germelina Leah Padilla Binibining Pilipinas International; Jennifer Pingree Binibining Pilipinas Maja; Precious Bernadette Tongko Binibining Pilipinas Tourism; Milagros Javelosa	1st Runner-Up; Mutya Laxa 2nd Runner-Up; Leonor Cueto	Miss Universe 1990; Germelina Leah Padilla (Ranked 12th) Miss International 1990; Jennifer Pingree (Unplaced)	
1989	Binibing Pilipinas Universe; Sara Jane Paez Binibining Pilipinas International; Lilia Eloisa Andanar Binibining Pilipinas Maja; Jeanne Therese Hilario Binibining Pilipinas Tourism; Marichele Cruz Binibining Pilipinas Flower Queen; Maria Rita Apostol	1st Runner-Up; Suzanne Fahling 2nd Runner-Up; Michelle Blardony	Miss Universe 1989; Sara Jane Paez (Unplaced) Miss International 1989; Lilia Eloisa Andanar (Unplaced) Miss Maja International 1989; Jeanne Therese Hilario (2nd Runner-Up)	
1988	Binibing Pilipinas Universe; Perfida Limpin Binibining Pilipinas International; Maria Anthea Robles Binibining Pilipinas Maja; Maria Muriel Moral Binibining Pilipinas Tourism; Maritoni Judith Daya	1st Runner-Up; Amelia Joy dela Cruz 2nd Runner-Up; Lorna Legaspi	Miss Universe 1988; Perfida Limpin (Unplaced) Miss International 1988; Maria Anthea Robles (Unplaced) Miss Maja International 1988; Maria Muriel Moral (Unplaced)	
1987	Binibing Pilipinas Universe; Geraldine Edith Asis Binibining Pilipinas International; Maria Lourdes Enriquez Binibining Pilipinas Maja; Maria Luisa Jimenez Binibining Pilipinas Tourism; Marie Avon Garcia	1st Runner-Up; Angela Larrazabal 2nd Runner-Up; Rosabelle Adriano	Miss Universe 1987; Geraldine Edith Asis (Top 10) Miss International 1987; Maria Lourdes Enriquez (Unplaced) Miss Maja International 1987; Maria Luisa Jimenez (Top 10)	
1986	Binibing Pilipinas Universe; Violeta Asela Naluz Binibining Pilipinas International; Jessie Alice Dixson Miss Maja Pilipinas; Maria Cristina Recto	1st Runner-Up; Catherina Salazar 2nd Runner-Up; Christine Bonifacio	Miss Universe 1986; Violeta Asela Naluz (Unplaced) Miss International 1986; Jessie Alice Dixson (Top 15) Miss Maja International 1986; Maria Cristina Recto (Unplaced)	
1985	Binibing Pilipinas Universe; Joyce Ann Burton Binibining Pilipinas International; Sabrina Simonette Marie Artadi Miss Young Pilipinas; Divina Cristina Alcala Miss Maja Pilipinas; Maria Luisa Gonzales	1st Runner-Up; Glenah Marie Slaton 2nd Runner-Up; Rita Rosanna Biazon	Miss Universe 1985; Joyce Ann Burton (Unplaced) Miss International 1985; Sabrina Simonette Marie Artadi (Unplaced) Miss Maja International 1985; Maria Luisa Gonzales (2nd Runner-Up)	
1984	Binibing Pilipinas Universe; Maria Desiree Verdadero Binibining Pilipinas International; Catherine Jane Brummitt Miss Young Pilipinas; Rachel Anne Wolfe Miss Maja Pilipinas; Maria Villa Bella Nachor Miss Press Photography Pilipinas; Maritoni Judith Daya	1st Runner-Up; Corazon Tierro 2nd Runner-Up; Anna Mari Lingad	Miss Universe 1984; Maria Desiree Verdadero (3rd Runner-Up) Miss International 1984; Maria Villa Bella Nachor (Switched pageants with Brummitt; Unplaced) Miss Maja International 1984; Catherine Jane Brummitt (Switched pageants with Nachor; Top 10)	
1983	Binibing Pilipinas Universe; Rosita Capuyon Binibining Pilipinas International; Flor Eden Pastrana Miss Young Pilipinas; Shalymar Alcantara Miss Maja Pilipinas; Maria Anna Cadiz	1st Runner-Up; Matea Leah Aurora Tagle 2nd Runner-Up; Racquel Buenaventura	Miss Universe 1983; Rosita Capuyon (Unplaced) Miss International 1983; Flor Eden Pastrana (Unplaced) Miss Young International 1983; Shalymar Alcantara (Top 15) Miss Maja International 1983; Maria Anna Cadiz (Top 10)	
1982	Binibing Pilipinas Universe; Maria Isabel Lopez Binibining Pilipinas International; Maria Adela Lisa Manibog Miss Young Pilipinas; Sharon Georgina Hughes Miss Maja Pilipinas; Nanette Cruz	1st Runner-Up; Maria Desiree Verdadero 2nd Runner-Up; Maria Ana Liza Gino	Miss Universe 1982; Maria Isabel Lopez (Unplaced) Miss International 1982; Maria Adela Lisa Manibog (Unplaced) Miss Maja International 1982; Nanette Cruz (Unplaced)	
1981	Binibing Pilipinas Universe; Maria Caroline Mendoza Binibining Pilipinas International; Alice Veronica Sacasas Miss Maja Pilipinas; Josephine Bautista	1st Runner-Up; Rosanna Peña 2nd Runner-Up; Maria Dolores Lopez	Miss Universe 1981; Maria Caroline Mendoza (Unplaced) Miss International 1981; Alice Veronica Sacasas (Top 15) Miss Maja International 1981; Josephine Bautista (Unplaced)	
1981	Miss Young Pilipinas; Joyce Ann Burton	1st Runner-Up; Evelyne Andrews 2nd Runner-Up; Monina Catherine Tan 3rd Runner-Up; Elizabeth Williams 4th Runner-Up; Angela Cruz	Miss Young International 1981; Joyce Ann Burton (Top 15)	
1980	Binibing Pilipinas Universe; Maria Rosario Silayan^{†} Binibining Pilipinas International; Diana Jeanne Christine Chiong Miss Young Pilipinas; Maria Felicidad Luis Miss Maja Pilipinas; Maria Asuncion Spirig	1st Runner-Up; Susan Africa 2nd Runner-Up; Celestina Maristela	Miss Universe 1980; Maria Rosario Silayan^{†} (3rd Runner-Up) Miss International 1980; Diana Jeanne Christine Chiong (Top 12 Semifinalist) Miss Young International 1980; Maria Felicidad Luis (4th Runner-Up) Miss Maja International 1980; Maria Asuncion Spirig (Top 10)	
1979	Binibing Pilipinas Universe; Criselda Cecilio Binibining Pilipinas International; Mimilanie Marquez Miss Young Pilipinas; Maria Teresa Carlson^{†} Miss Maja Pilipinas; Princess Ava Quibranza	1st Runner-Up; Perla Salig 2nd Runner-Up; Catherine Veloso	Miss Universe 1979; Criselda Cecilio (Unplaced) Miss International 1979; Mimilanie Marquez (Miss International) Miss Young International 1979; Maria Teresa Carlson^{†} (Unplaced) Miss Maja International 1979; Princess Ava Quibranza (Top 10)	
1978	Binibing Pilipinas Universe; Jennifer Cortes Binibining Pilipinas International; Luz Policarpio Miss Young Pilipinas; Anne Rose Blas Miss Maja Pilipinas; Ligaya Pascual	1st Runner-Up; Kathryn Manuel 2nd Runner-Up; Maria Luisa Montinola	Miss Universe 1978; Jennifer Cortes (Unplaced) Miss International 1978; Luz Policarpio (Unplaced) Miss Young International 1978; Anne Rose Blas (Unplaced) Miss Maja International 1978; Ligaya Pascual (Unplaced)	
1977	Binibing Pilipinas Universe; Anna Lorraine Kier Binibining Pilipinas International; Maria Cristina Alberto Miss Young Pilipinas; Dorothy Sue Bradley Miss Maja Pilipinas; Annabelle Arambulo	1st Runner-Up; Digna Ramos 2nd Runner-Up; Diana Jeanne Christine Chiong	Miss Universe 1977; Anna Lorraine Kier (Unplaced) Miss International 1977; Maria Cristina Alberto (Competed but Withdrew) Miss Young International 1977; Dorothy Sue Bradley (1st Runner-Up) Miss Maja International 1977; Annabelle Arambulo (Unplaced)	
1976	Binibing Pilipinas Universe; Elizabeth de Padua Binibining Pilipinas International; Maria Dolores Ascalon Miss Young Pilipinas; Marilou Fernandez Miss Maja Pilipinas; Cynthia Nakpil	1st Runner-Up; Celita de Castro 2nd Runner-Up; Maricel Quintos	Miss Universe 1976; Elizabeth de Padua (Unplaced) Miss International 1976; Maria Dolores Ascalon (Top 15) Miss Young International 1976; Marilou Fernandez (Unplaced) Miss Maja International 1976; Cynthia Nakpil (Unplaced)	
1975	Binibing Pilipinas Universe; Rose Marie Brosas Binibining Pilipinas International; Jaye Murphy Miss Young Pilipinas; Jean Saburit Miss Maja Pilipinas; Annette Liwanag	1st Runner-Up; Hermenia Nenita Hernandez 2nd Runner-Up; Maria Luisa Montinola	Miss Universe 1975; Rose Marie Brosas (4th Runner-Up) Miss International 1975; Jaye Murphy (Top 15) Miss Young International 1975; Jean Saburit (Unplaced) Miss Maja International 1975; Annette Liwanag (4th Runner-Up)	
1974	Binibing Pilipinas Universe; Guadalupe Sanchez Binibining Pilipinas International; Erlynne Bernardez Miss Young Pilipinas; Deborah Enriquez Miss Maja Pilipinas; Pacita Eduarda Guevara	1st Runner-Up; Imelda Cajanding 2nd Runner-Up; Cynthia Villanueva	Miss Universe 1974; Guadalupe Sanchez (Top 12) Miss International 1974; Erlynne Bernardez (Unplaced) Miss Young International 1974; Deborah Enriquez (Unplaced) Miss Maja International 1974; Pacita Eduarda Guevara (3rd Runner-Up)	
1973	Binibining Pilipinas Universe; Maria Margarita Moran Binibining Pilipinas International; Maria Elena Ojeda Miss Young Pilipinas; Maria Milagros de la Fuente	1st Runner-Up; Maria Nanette Prodigalidad (became the first Miss Maja Pilipinas) 2nd Runner-Up; Joan Salas 3rd Runner-Up; Mercedes Ditas Zabarte 4th Runner-Up; Pacita Rosalinda Yuviengco	Miss Universe 1973; Maria Margarita Moran (Miss Universe) Miss International 1973; Maria Elena Ojeda (4th Runner-Up) Miss Young International 1973; Maria Milagros de la Fuente (Unplaced) Miss Maja International; Maria Nanette Prodigalidad (1st Runner-Up)	
1972	Binibining Pilipinas; Armi Barbara Crespo Miss Philippines; Yolanda Dominguez Miss Young Pilipinas; Maria Lourdes Vallejo Miss Charming Pilipinas; Maria Isabel Seva	1st Runner-Up; Ana Maria Arambulo 2nd Runner-Up; Maria Paripola Penson 3rd Runner-Up; Noa-Noa Labit 4th Runner-Up; Consuelo Lorena Escalambre	Miss Universe 1972; Armi Barbara Crespo (Top 12) Miss International 1972; Yolanda Dominguez (2nd Runner-Up) Miss Young International 1972; Maria Lourdes Vallejo (Top 15)	
1971	Binibining Pilipinas; Vida Valentina Doria Miss Philippines; Evelyn Camus Miss Young Pilipinas; Maricar Zaldarriaga	1st Runner-Up; Milagros Gutierrez (became the first Miss Charming Pilipinas) 2nd Runner-Up; Donna de Guzman 3rd Runner-Up; Consuelo Lozano 4th Runner-Up; Carolyn Flores	Miss Universe 1971; Vida Valentina Doria (Unplaced) Miss International 1971; Evelyn Camus (2nd Runner-Up) Miss Young International 1971; Maricar Zaldarriaga (Top 15)	
1970	Binibining Pilipinas; Simonette de los Reyes Miss Philippines; Aurora Pijuan	1st Runner-Up; Imelda Pagaspas 2nd Runner-Up; Elizabeth Magbanua 3rd Runner-Up; Ana Maria Caguiat 4th Runner-Up; Lily del Rosario	Miss Universe 1970; Simonette de los Reyes (Unplaced) Miss International 1970; Aurora Pijuan (Miss International)	
1970	Miss Young Pilipinas; Carmencita Avecilla	1st Runner-Up; Ana Maria Caguiat 2nd Runner-Up; Carolina Anson 3rd Runner-Up; Eva Abesamis 4th Runner-Up; Lily Cortez Venarao	Miss Young International 1970; Carmencita Avecilla (2nd Runner-Up)	
1969	Binibining Pilipinas; Gloria Maria Diaz Miss Philippines; Margaret Rose Montinola	1st Runner-Up; Nelia Sancho 2nd Runner-Up; Cynthia Quirino 3rd Runner-Up; Maricar Azaola 4th Runner-Up; Carmina Gutierrez	Miss Universe 1969; Gloria Maria Diaz (Miss Universe) Miss International 1969; Margaret Rose Montinola (Top 15)	
1968	Binibining Pilipinas; Rosario Zaragoza	1st Runner-Up; Maria Elena Samson 2nd Runner-Up; Benigna Rustia 3rd Runner-Up; Tina Artillaga 4th Runner-Up; Georgitta Pimentel	Miss Universe 1968; Rosario Zaragoza (Unplaced)	
1968	Miss Philippines; Nenita Ramos	1st Runner-Up; Fortune Aleta 2nd Runner-Up; Benigna Rustia 3rd Runner-Up; Bernadette Bayle 4th Runner-Up; Maria Elena Samson	Miss International 1968; Nenita Ramos (Top 15)	
1967	Binibining Pilipinas; Pilar Delilah Pilapil	1st Runner-Up; Maria Luisa Cordova 2nd Runner-Up; Maria Rica Key 3rd Runner-Up; Maria Mercedes Uy 4th Runner-Up; Erlinda Stuart	Miss Universe 1967; Pilar Delilah Pilapil (Unplaced)	
1966	Binibining Pilipinas; Maria Clarinda Soriano	1st Runner-Up; Elizabeth Winsett 2nd Runner-Up; Lillian Elizabeth Carriedo 3rd Runner-Up; Mary Lou Navarro 4th Runner-Up; Josine Loinaz de Tavera	Miss Universe 1966; Maria Clarinda Soriano (Top 15)	
1965	Binibining Pilipinas; Louise Patricia Vail	1st Runner-Up; Isabel Santos (later appointed as Miss Philippines International) 2nd Runner-Up; Sheba Mulok 3rd Runner-Up; June Frances Roco 4th Runner-Up; Elvira Gonzalez	Miss Universe 1965; Louise Patricia Vail (Top 15) Miss International 1965; Isabel Santos (Unplaced)	
1964	Binibining Pilipinas; Maria Myrna Panlilio	1st Runner-Up; Milagros Cataag 2nd Runner-Up; Elvira Gonzalez	Miss Universe 1964; Maria Myrna Panlilio (Unplaced) Miss International 1964; Gemma Cruz (Miss International)	

== International placements ==
Color keys

- Declared as the winner
- Ended as a runner-up
- Ended as a finalist or semifinalist

=== Current franchises ===
==== Miss International ====
Year	Delegate	International Performance	
Year	Delegate	Placement	Special Award(s)
Miss Philippines (1968 – 1972)
1968	Nenita Ramos	Top 15	
1969	Margaret Montinola	Top 15	
1970	Aurora Pijuan	Miss International 1970	
1971	Evelyn Camus	2nd Runner Up	
1972	Yolanda Dominguez	2nd Runner Up	Best National Costume
Binibining Pilipinas International (1973 – Present)
1973	Elena Ojeda	4th Runner Up	
1974	Erlynne Bernardez	Unplaced	
1975	Jaye Murphy	Top 15	
1976	Dolores Ascalon	Top 15	
1977	Maria Cristina Alberto	Withdrew	
1978	Luz Policarpio	Unplaced	
1979	Melanie Marquez	Miss International 1979	Best National Costume
1980	Diana Chiong	Top 12	
1981	Alice Sacasas	Top 15	
1982	Maria Manibog	Unplaced	
1983	Flor Pastrana	Unplaced	
1984	Bella Nachor	Unplaced	
1985	Sabrina Artadi	Unplaced	
1986	Alice Dixson	Top 15	
1987	Lourdes Enriquez	Top 10	
1988	Anthea Robles	Unplaced	
1989	Eloisa Andanar	Unplaced	Miss Friendship
1990	Jennifer Pingree	Unplaced	
1991	Patricia Betita	Top 15	
1992	Joanne Alivio	Unplaced	
1993	Sheela Santarin	Unplaced	
1994	Alma Concepcion	Top 15	Miss Friendship
1995	Gladys Dueñas	Top 15	
1996	Yedda Kittilstvedt	Top 15	
1997	Susan Ritter	Top 15	
1998	Colette Glazer	Top 15	
1999	Georgina Sandico	Unplaced	
2000	Joanna Peñaloza	Unplaced	
2001	Maricarl Tolosa	Unplaced	
2002	Kristine Alzar	Unplaced	
2003	Jhezarie Javier	Unplaced	
2004	Margaret-Ann Bayot	Top 15	
2005	Lara Quigaman	Miss International 2005	
2006	Denille Valmonte	Unplaced	
2007	Nadia Shami	Unplaced	
2008	Patricia Fernandez	Top 10	
2009	Melody Gersbach^{†}	Top 15	
2010	Krista Kleiner	Top 15	Miss Talent; Miss Expressive
2011	Dianne Necio	Top 15	Miss Internet Popularity
2012	Nicole Schmitz	Top 15	
2013	Bea Santiago	Miss International 2013	
2014	Bianca Guidotti	Unplaced	
2015	Janicel Lubina	Top 10	Best Dresser
2016	Kylie Verzosa	Miss International 2016	
2017	Mariel de Leon	Unplaced	
2018	Ahtisa Manalo	1st Runner Up	Miss People's Choice Award
2019	Patch Magtanong	Top 8	
2022	Hannah Arnold	Top 15	Top 8 for Best National Costume
2023	Nicole Borromeo	3rd Runner Up	
2024	Angelica Lopez	Unplaced	Top 21
2025	Myrna Esguerra	4th Runner Up	
2026	Katrina Johnson	TBD	TBD
2027	Gwendoline Soriano	TBD	TBD

==== The Miss Globe ====
Year	Represented	Delegate	International Performance	
Year	Represented	Delegate	Placement	Special Award(s)
Binibining Pilipinas Globe (2015 – Present)
2015	Pampanga (Mexico)	Ann Colis	The Miss Globe 2015	
2016	Pampanga	Nichole Manalo	3rd Runner Up	Miss Dream Girl of the World
2017	Tarlac	Nelda Ibe	1st Runner Up	
2018	Quezon City	Michele Gumabao	Top 15	Miss Dream Girl of the World; Miss Social Media
2019	Laguna	Leren Bautista	2nd Runner Up	
2021	Batangas	Maureen Montagne	The Miss Globe 2021	1st Runner Up for Miss Bikini; Runner Up for Head to Head Challenge
2022	Tacloban City	Chelsea Fernandez	Top 15	Head to Head Challenge Winner
2023	Bataan	Anna Lakrini	2nd Runner Up	
2024	Pampanga	Jasmin Bungay	2nd Runner Up	
2025	Iligan City	Annabelle McDonnell	Top 11	Head to Head Challenge Winner
2026	Tarlac	Sasha Lacuna	Top 11	Miss Social Media

=== Former franchises ===
==== Miss Universe ====
Year	Represented	Delegate	International Performance	
Year	Represented	Delegate	Placement	Special Award(s)
Binibining Pilipinas (1964 — 1972)
1964	Cavite	Myrna Panlilio	Unplaced	
1965	Iloilo City	Louise Vail	Top 15	
1966	Cavite (Bacoor)	Clarinda Soriano	Top 15	
1967	Cebu (Liloan)	Pilar Pilapil	Unplaced	
1968	Pampanga (Guagua)	Rosario Zaragoza	Unplaced	
1969	La Union	Gloria Diaz	Miss Universe 1969	Top 10 for Best Swimsuit
1970	Pampanga (Arayat)	Simonette de los Reyes	Unplaced	
1971	Manila	Vida Doria	Unplaced	Miss Photogenic
1972	Las Piñas	Armi Barbara Crespo	Top 12	
Binibining Pilipinas Universe (1973 — 2010)
1973	Manila	Margie Moran	Miss Universe 1973	Miss Photogenic
1974	Manila	Guadalupe Sanchez	Top 12	
1975	Makati	Rose Marie Brosas	4th Runner Up	
1976	Masbate (Ticao Island)	Elizabeth de Padua	Unplaced	
1977	Baguio	Anna Kier	Unplaced	
1978	Manila	Jennifer Cortes	Unplaced	
1979	Quezon City	Criselda Cecilio	Unplaced	
1980	Pangasinan	Rosario Silayan^{†}	3rd Runner Up	
1981	Canada; Misamis Oriental (Tagoloan)	Caroline Mendoza	Unplaced	
1982	Cagayan de Oro	Maria Isabel Lopez	Unplaced	
1983	Bohol (Ubay); Manila	Rosita Capuyon	Unplaced	
1984	Laguna (San Pedro)	Desiree Verdadero	3rd Runner Up	
1985	Manila	Joyce Ann Burton	Unplaced	
1986	Pampanga (Apalit)	Violeta Naluz	Unplaced	
1987	Capiz (Roxas City)	Geraldine Asis	Top 10	
1988	Manila	Perfida Limpin	Unplaced	
1989	Ilocos Sur (Masingal)	Sara Paez	Unplaced	
1990	Manila	Germelina Padilla	Unplaced	
1991	Parañaque	Lourdes Gonzales	Unplaced	
1992	Quezon City	Elizabeth Berroya	Unplaced	
1993	Manila	Melinda Gallardo	Unplaced	
1994	Manila	Charlene Gonzales	Top 6	Best National Costume; Ivory Best Hair Award
1995	Parañaque	Joanne Santos	Unplaced	
1996	Las Piñas	Aileen Damiles	Unplaced	Miss Photogenic
1997	Angeles	Abbygale Arenas	Unplaced	Miss Photogenic
1998	Bacolod	Jewel Lobaton	Unplaced	
1999	Quezon City	Miriam Quiambao	1st Runner Up	Clairol Herbal Essence Style Award
2000	Makati	Nina Ricci Alagao	Unplaced	
2001	Baguio	Zorayda Andam	Unplaced	1st Runner Up for Best National Costume
2002	Manila	Karen Agustin	Unplaced	
2003	Pampanga	Carla Balingit	Unplaced	
2004	Bulacan	Maricar Balagtas	Unplaced	
2005	Pasig	Gionna Cabrera	Unplaced	Miss Photogenic; Top 5 for Best National Costume; Thai Airways Silk Award
2006	Davao City	Lia Ramos	Unplaced	Miss Photogenic
2007	Batangas	Theresa Licaros	Unplaced	Miss Photogenic
2008	Rizal (San Mateo)	Jennifer Barrientos	Unplaced	
2009	Parañaque	Bianca Manalo	Unplaced	
2010	Camarines Sur	Venus Raj	4th Runner Up	
Miss Universe Philippines (2011 — 2019)
2011	General Santos	Shamcey Supsup	3rd Runner Up	
2012	Bataan	Janine Tugonon	1st Runner Up	
2013	Laguna (Alaminos)	Ariella Arida	3rd Runner Up	Fan Vote Winner
2014	Cotabato	Mary Jean Lastimosa	Top 10	
2015	Cagayan de Oro	Pia Wurtzbach	Miss Universe 2015	
2016	Quezon City	Maxine Medina	Top 6	
2017	Camarines Sur	Rachel Peters	Top 10	
2018	Albay	Catriona Gray	Miss Universe 2018	
2019	Cebu (Talisay)	Gazini Ganados	Top 20	Best National Costume

==== Miss Supranational ====
Year	Represented	Delegate	International Performance	
Year	Represented	Delegate	Placement	Special Award(s)
Binibining Pilipinas Supranational (2012 – 2019)
2012	Northern Samar	Elaine Moll	3rd Runner Up	
2013	Isabela (Santa Maria)	Mutya Datul	Miss Supranational 2013	Miss Personality
2014	Albay (Daraga)	Yvethe Santiago	Top 20	
2015	Cebu City	Rogelie Catacutan	Top 20	
2016	Quezon (Lucban)	Joanna Eden	Top 25	
2017	Nueva Ecija	Chanel Thomas	Top 10	Miss Friendship
2018	Davao City	Jehza Huelar	Top 10	
2019	Maguindanao	Resham Saeed	Top 25	

==== Miss Grand International ====
Year	Represented	Delegate	International Performance		Ref.
Year	Represented	Delegate	Placement	Special Award(s)	Ref.
Binibining Pilipinas Grand International (2013, 2015 – 2022)
2013	Bulacan	Annalie Forbes	3rd Runner Up		
2015	Pangasinan	Parul Shah	3rd Runner Up	Best National Costume	
2016	Manila	Nicole Cordoves	1st Runner Up		
2017	Cebu (Mandaue City)	Elizabeth Clenci	2nd Runner Up		
2018	Cebu City	Eva Patalinjug	Unplaced		
2019	Cebu	Samantha Lo	Unplaced; Resigned		
2019	Pasig	Maria Andrea Abesamis	Assumed Title		
2020	Palawan (Puerto Princesa City)	Samantha Bernardo	1st Runner Up		
2021	Cavite	Samantha Panlilio	Unplaced		
2022	Laguna (San Pablo)	Roberta Tamondong	5th Runner Up		

==== Miss Intercontinental ====
Year	Represented	Delegate	International Performance	
Year	Represented	Delegate	Placement	Special Award(s)
Binibining Pilipinas Intercontinental (2014 – 2022)
2014	Cebu City	Kris Janson	2nd Runner Up	Miss Intercontinental Asia and Oceania; Miss Photogenic
2015	Camarines Sur (Nabua)	Christi McGarry	1st Runner Up	Miss Intercontinental Asia
2016	Laguna	Jennifer Hammond	Top 15	
2017	Davao City	Katarina Rodriguez	1st Runner Up	Miss Intercontinental Asia and Oceania; Miss Media Popularity
2018	Bohol (Ubay)	Karen Gallman	Miss Intercontinental 2018	Best Body Beautiful; Media Favorite; Standout Beauty; Miss Intercontinental Asia and Oceania
2019	Pampanga	Emma Tiglao	Top 20	Miss Popularity
2021	Cagayan de Oro City	Cindy Obeñita	Miss Intercontinental 2021	Miss Intercontinental Asia and Oceania; Miss Popular Vote
2022	Eastern Samar (Borongan)	Gabrielle Basiano	Top 20	

==== Special Title: Bb. Pilipinas Tourism ====
Year	Delegate
Binibining Pilipinas Tourism (1987 – 1990, 1993 – 1994, 2001, 2005)
1987	Marie Avon Garcia
1988	Maritoni Judith Daya
1989	Marichele Cruz
1990	Milagros Javelosa
1993	Jenette Fernando
1994	Sheila Marie Dizon
2001	Zorayda Ruth Andam
2005	Wendy Valdez

==== Miss Tourism International ====
Year	Delegate	International Performance	
Year	Delegate	Placement	Special Award(s)
Binibining Pilipinas Tourism International (2001)
2001	Michelle Reyes	Miss Tourism International	

==== Miss Tourism Queen International / Queen of Tourism International ====
Year	Delegate	International Performance	
Year	Delegate	Placement	Special Award(s)
Binibining Pilipinas Queen of Tourism (2003)
2003	Noela Mae Evangelista	Queen of Tourism International	
Binibining Pilipinas Tourism (2011 – 2015)
2011	Isabella Angela Manjon	Unplaced	
2012	Katrina Jayne Dimaranan	Pageant was cancelled	
2013	Joanna Cindy Miranda	Top 10	
2014	Parul Shah	Appointed as Binibining Pilipinas Grand International 2015	
2015	Ann Lorraine Colis	Appointed as Binibining Pilipinas Globe 2015	

==== Miss World ====
Year	Delegate	International Performance	
Year	Delegate	Placement	Special award(s)
Binibining Pilipinas World (1992 – 2010)
1992	Marina Benipayo	Unplaced	
1993	Ruffa Gutierrez	2nd Runner Up	Miss World Asia & Oceania
1994	Caroline Subijano	Top 10	
1995	Reham Tago	Unplaced	
1996	Daisy Reyes	Unplaced	Miss Personality
1997	Kristine Florendo	Unplaced	
1998	Rachel Soriano	Unplaced	
1999	Lalaine Edson	Unplaced	
2000	Katherine De Guzman	Unplaced	
2001	Gilrhea Quinzon	Unplaced	
2002	Katherine Manalo	Top 10	
2003	Rafaela Yunon	Top 5	
2004	Karla Bautista	Top 5	Miss World Asia & Oceania
2005	Carlene Aguilar	Top 15	
2006	Anna Igpit	Unplaced	
2007	Maggie Wilson	Unplaced	
2008	Danielle Castaño	Unplaced	
2009	Marie-Ann Umali	Unplaced	
2010	Czarina Gatbonton	Unplaced	

==== Miss Maja International ====
Year	Delegate	International Performance	
Year	Delegate	Placement	Special Award(s)
Miss Maja Pilipinas (1973 – 1986)
1973	Nanette Prodigalidad	1st Runner Up	Maja Fotogenia
1974	Pacita Guevara	3rd Runner Up	
1975	Annette Liwanag	4th Runner Up	
1976	Cynthia Nakpil	Unplaced	
1977	Annabelle Arambulo	Unplaced	
1978	Ligaya Pascual	Unplaced	
1979	Princess Ava Quibranza	Unplaced	Best in National Costume
1980	Asuncion Spirig	Unplaced	Best in National Costume
1981	Josephine Bautista	Unplaced	Best National Costume; Maja Popularidad
1982	Nanette Cruz	Unplaced	
1983	Anna Cadiz	Top 10	Best in National Costume
1984	Catherine Jane Brummitt	Top 10	
1985	Luisa Gonzales	2nd Runner Up	Best in National Costume
1986	Cristina Recto	Unplaced	Best National Costume; Miss Maja Talent
Binibining Pilipinas Maja (1987 - 1992, 1995)
1987	Luisa Jimenez	Top 10	
1988	Muriel Moral	Unplaced	Best National Costume; Miss Maja Simpatica
1989	Jeanne Hilario	2nd Runner Up	
1990	Precious Bernadette Tongko	No International Pageant Held	
1991	Selina Manalad	Unplaced	Miss Maja Popularidad
1992	Marina Pura Benipayo	No International Pageant Held	
1995	Tiffany Cuña	Top 15	
Miss Maja Mundial Filipinas (2004)
2004	Margaret-Ann Bayot	1st Runner Up	

==== Miss Young International ====
Year	Delegate	International Performance	
Year	Delegate	Placement	Special Award(s)
Miss Young Pilipinas (1970 – 1985)
1970	Carmencita Avecilla	2nd Runner Up	
1971	Maricar Zaldarriaga	Top 15	Miss Photogenic
1972	Lourdes Vallejo	Top 15	
1973	Milagros de la Fuente		
1974	Deborah Enriquez		
1975	Jean Saburit		
1976	Marilou Fernandez		
1977	Dorothy Bradley	1st Runner Up	Best in National Costume
1978	Anne Rose Blas		
1979	Teresa Carlson^{†}		
1980	Felicidad Luis	4th Runner Up	
1981	Joyce Ann Burton	Top 15	
1982	Sharon Georgina Hughes	No International Pageant Held	
1983	Shalymar Alcantara	Top 15	
1984	Rachel Anne Wolfe	No International Pageant Held	
1985	Divina Cristina Alcala	No International Pageant Held	

== Bb. Pilipinas - Runners Up ==
Year	1st Runner Up	2nd Runner Up	3rd Runner Up	4th Runner Up
1964	Milagros Cataag	Elvira Gonzales		
1965	Isabel Santos	Sheba Mulok	June Frances Roco	Elvira Gonzalez
1966	Elizabeth Winsett	Lillian Elizabeth Carriedo	Mary Lou Navarro	Josine Loinas de Tavera
1967	Maria Luisa Cordova	Maria Rica Key	Maria Mercedes Uy	Erlinda Stuart
1968	Maria Elena Samson	Benigna Rustia	Tina Artillaga	Georgitta Pimentel
1969	Nelia Sancho	Cynthia Quirino	Maricar Azaola	Carmina Gutierrez
1970	Imelda Pagaspas	Elizabeth Magbanua	Ana Maria Caguiat	Lily del Rosario
1971	Milagros Gutierrez	Donna de Guzman	Consuelo Lozano	Carolyn Flores
1972	Ana Maria Arambulo	Maria Paripola Penson	Noa-Noa Labit	Consuelo Lorena Escalambre
1973	Maria Nanette Prodigalidad	Joan Salas	Mercedes Ditas Zabarte	Pacita Rosalinda Yuviengco
1974	Imelda Cajanding	Cynthia Villanueva		
1975	Hermenia Nenita Hernandez	Maria Luisa Montinola		
1976	Celita de Castro	Maricel Quintos		
1977	Digna Ramos	Diana Jeanne Christine Chiong		
1978	Kathryn Manuel	Maria Luisa Mon		
1979	Perla Salig	Catherine Veloso		
1980	Susan Africa	Celestina Maristela		
1981	Rosanna Peña	Maria Dolores Lopez		
1982	Maria Desiree Verdadero	Maria Ana Liza Gino		
1983	Matea Leah Aurora Tagle	Racquel Buenaventura		
1984	Corazon Tierro	Anna Mari Lingad		
1985	Glenah Marie Slaton	Rita Rosanna Biazon		
1986	Catherina Salazar	Christine Bonifacio		
1987	Angela Larrazabal	Rosabelle Adriano		
1988	Amelia Joy dela Cruz	Lorna Legaspi		
1989	Suzanne Fahling	Michelle Blardony		
1990	Mutya Laxa	Leonor Cueto		
1991	Jenette Fernando	Anna Marie Torres		
1992	Hazel Huelves	Michelle Buan		
1993	Cristina Esguerra	Myra Macariola		
1994	Abbygale Arenas	Eda Calonia		
1995	Caroline Pobre	Margaret Laing		
1996	Maria Sovietskaya Bacud	Sonia Santiago		
1997	Abiele Arianne del Moral	Marivic Galang		
1998	Elsie Sicat	Esabela Cabrera		
1999	Michelle Arcangel	Joelle Marie Pelaez		
2000	Maria Cristina Tan	Nicole Hofer		
2001	Michelle Reyes	Maricar Balagtas		
2002	Margaret-Ann Bayot	Maria Lourdes Magno		
2003	Kate Sephora Baesa	Noela Mae Evangelista		
2004	Tracy Ann Javelona	Princess Jasmine Tiongson		
2005	Wendy Valdez	Melanie Ediza		
2006	Rosalyn Sirikit Santiago	Jeanne Bernadette Bello		
2007	Leizel Verses	Abigail Lesley Cruz		
2008	Danielle Kirsten Castaño	Elizabeth Jacqueline Nacuspag		
2009	Richell Angalot	Regina Hahn		
2010	Dianne Elaine Necio	Helen Nicolette Henson		
2011	Janine Mari Tugonon	Mary Jean Lastimosa		
2012	Elaine Kay Moll	Annalie Forbes		
2013	Pia Wurtzbach	not awarded		
2014	Laura Victoria Lehmann	Hannah Ruth Sison		
2015	Hannah Ruth Sison	Kimverlyn Suiza		
2016	Angelica Alita	Jehza Mae Huelar		
2017	Charmaine Elima	Kristel Guelos		
2018	Vickie Marie Milagrosa Rushton	Samantha Mae Bernardo		
2019	Samantha Mae Bernardo	no replacement		
2021	Gabrielle Camille Basiano	Meiji Cruz		
2022	Herlene Nicole Budol	Stacey Daniella Gabriel		
2023	Katrina Anne Johnson	Atasha Reign Parani		
2024	Christal Jean de la Cruz	Trisha Martinez		
2025	Dalia Varde Khattab	Kathleen Enid Espenido		
2026	Julianne Raine Antonio	Tracy Mae Sunio		

== Appointed titleholders ==
Color keys

- A year wherein the Philippines earned a crown
- A year wherein the Philippines placed as a runner-up
- A year wherein the Philippines placed in the top 5, top 10, top 15, or as a semifinalist

Year	Name	National Title	Appointed Title	International placement
1969	Nelia Sancho	Binibining Pilipinas 1969 1st Runner-Up	Queen of the Pacific 1971	Queen of the Pacific 1971
1971	Milagros Gutierrez	Binibining Pilipinas 1971 1st Runner-Up	Miss Charming Pilipinas 1971	Miss Charming International 1971 (3rd Runner-Up)
1972	Maria Isabel Seva	Miss Charming Pilipinas 1972	Miss Charming Pilipinas 1972	Miss Charming Pilipinas 1972 (unplaced)
1973	Maria Nanette Prodigalidad	Binibining Pilipinas 1973 1st Runner-Up	Miss Maja Pilipinas 1973	Miss Maja Internacional 1973 (1st Runner-Up)
1973	Joan Gatlin Salas	Binibining Pilipinas 1973 2nd Runner-Up	Miss World Peace Philippines 1973	Miss World Peace Philippines 1973 (unplaced)
2001	Michelle Reyes	Binibining Pilipinas 2001 1st Runner-Up	Binibining Pilipinas Tourism International 2001	Miss Tourism International 2001
2001	Maricar Balagtas	Binibining Pilipinas 2001 2nd Runner-Up	Binibining Pilipinas Globe International 2001	Miss Globe International 2001
2002	Kristine Alzar	Binibining Pilipinas International 2002	Miss Tourism International Black Sea 2002	Miss Tourism International Black Sea 2002
2002	Margaret Ann Bayot	Binibining Pilipinas 2002 1st Runner-Up	Miss Internet WWW 2002	Miss Internet WWW 2002 (2nd Runner-Up)
2003	Jhezarie Javier	Binibining Pilipinas International 2003	Miss Philippines - ASEAN 2005	Miss ASEAN 2005
2003	Noela Mae Evangelista	Binibining Pilipinas 2003 2nd Runner up	Binibining Pilipinas Queen of Tourism International 2003	Queen of Tourism International 2003
2004	Margaret Ann Bayot	Binibining Pilipinas International 2004	Miss Maja Mundial - Philippines 2004	Miss Maja Mundial 2004 (1st Runner-Up)
2005	Wendy Valdez	Binibining Pilipinas Tourism 2005	Binibining Pilipinas Tourism 2005	Miss Tourism 2005 (Not able to attend the pageant)
2012	Elaine Kay Moll (Note: After the pageant in 2012, Binibining Pilipinas 2012 First Runner-up Elaine Moll was appointed the title of Binibining Pilipinas-Supranational and became that year's official representative to the Miss Supranational. Binibining Pilipinas 2012 second runner-up Annalie Forbes replaced her as the first runner-up. Annalie Forbes was then appointed and given the title of Miss Grand Philippines by the Miss Grand International organizers and John dela Vega to be the Philippines' first representative to the first Miss Grand International, where she placed third runner-up.)	Binibining Pilipinas 2012 1st Runner-Up	Miss Supranational Philippines 2012	Miss Supranational 2012 (3rd Runner-Up)
2012	Annalie Forbes (Note: After the pageant in 2012, Binibining Pilipinas 2012 First Runner-up Elaine Moll was appointed the title of Binibining Pilipinas-Supranational and became that year's official representative to the Miss Supranational. Binibining Pilipinas 2012 second runner-up Annalie Forbes replaced her as the first runner-up. Annalie Forbes was then appointed and given the title of Miss Grand Philippines by the Miss Grand International organizers and John dela Vega to be the Philippines' first representative to the first Miss Grand International, where she placed third runner-up.)	Binibining Pilipinas 2012 2nd Runner-Up	Miss Grand Philippines 2013	Miss Grand International 2013 (3rd Runner-Up)
2014	Parul Shah	Binibining Pilipinas Tourism 2014	Miss Grand Philippines 2015	Miss Grand International 2015 (3rd Runner-Up)
2015	Ann Lorraine Colis	Binibining Pilipinas Tourism 2015	Miss Globe Philippines 2015	The Miss Globe 2015
2019	Samantha Mae Bernardo (Note: After the postponement of Binibining Pilipinas 2020, Binibining Pilipinas 2019 First Runner-up (originally Binibining Pilipinas 2019 Second Runner-up). Samantha Mae Bernardo was then appointed and given the title of Binibining Pilipinas-Grand International 2020.)	Binibining Pilipinas 2019 1st Runner-Up	Binibining Pilipinas Grand International 2020	Miss Grand International 2020 (1st Runner-Up)
2022	Herlene Nicole Budol	Binibining Pilipinas 2022 1st Runner-Up	Miss Planet Philippines 2022	Miss Planet International 2022 (withdrew)
2022	Meiji Cruz	Binibining Pilipinas 2021 2nd Runner-Up	Miss CosmoWorld Philippines 2022	Miss CosmoWorld 2022
