= Binibining Pilipinas 2022 =

58th Binibining Pilipinas pageant

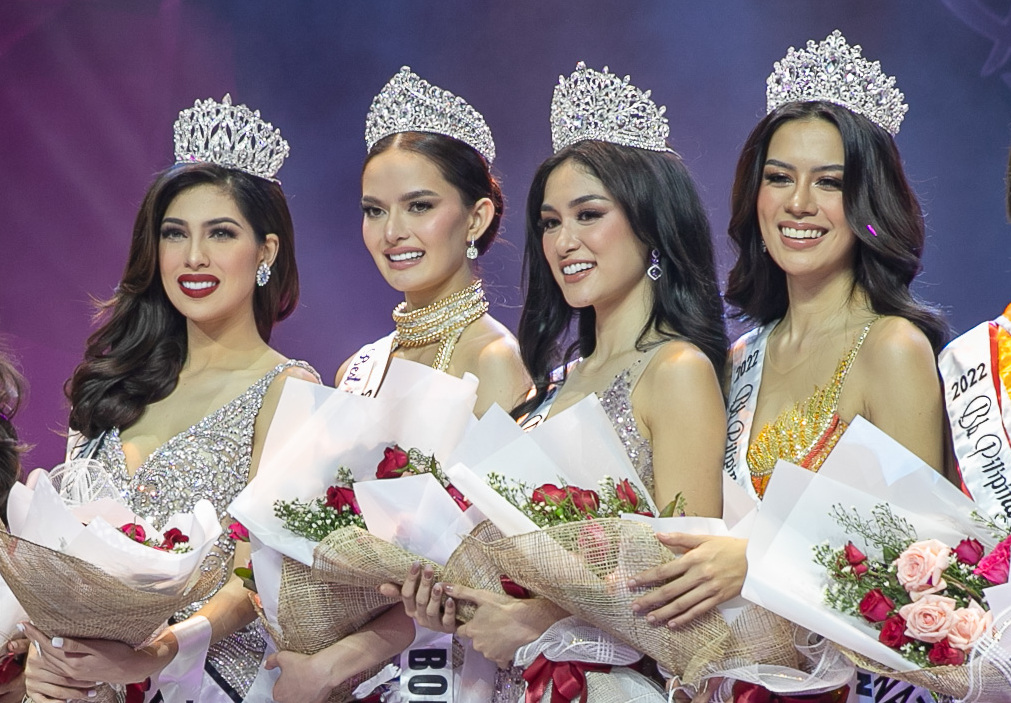
- Chelsea Fernandez, Gabrielle Basiano, Nicole Borromeo, and Roberta Tamondong
- Date: July 31, 2022
- Presenters: Catriona Gray; Nicole Cordoves; Edward Barber; Samantha Bernardo
- Entertainment: SB19; Maymay Entrata
- Venue: Smart Araneta Coliseum, Quezon City, Philippines
- Broadcaster: ABS-CBN; TV5
- Entrants: 40
- Placements: 12
- Withdrawals: Angeles; Pampanga; Pangasinan
- Winner: Nicole Borromeo; Cebu
- Congeniality: Eiffel Rosalita, Catanduanes
- Best National Costume: Graciella Lehmann, Oriental Mindoro
- Photogenic: Yllana Marie Aduana, Laguna
- Opening trailer: "Win Your Heart", SB19

Binibining Pilipinas 2022 was the 58th edition of Binibining Pilipinas. It took place at the Smart Araneta Coliseum in Quezon City, Philippines on July 31, 2022.

At the end of the event, Hannah Arnold crowned Nicole Borromeo of Cebu as Binibining Pilipinas International 2022; Cinderella Obeñita crowned Gabrielle Basiano of Borongan, Eastern Samar, as Binibining Pilipinas Intercontinental 2022; Maureen Montagne crowned Chelsea Fernandez of Tacloban as Binibining Pilipinas Globe 2022; and Samantha Panlilio crowned Roberta Tamondong of San Pablo, Laguna, as Binibining Pilipinas Grand International 2022. Herlene Budol of Angono, Rizal, was named first runner-up while Stacey Gabriel of Cainta, Rizal, was named second runner-up.

This edition was the last to award the Binibining Pilipinas Grand International title after the franchise was transferred to the new Miss Grand Philippines organization.

ABS-CBN broadcast the coronation night via Kapamilya Channel and free-to-air channels A2Z and TV5. The pageant was also simulcast on ABS-CBN's Metro Channel and livestreamed on iWantTFC and YouTube. The competition was hosted by Nicole Cordoves, Catriona Gray, Samantha Bernardo and Edward Barber.

== Pageant ==
=== Selection of participants ===
40 contestants were chosen at the New Frontier Theater on April 22, 2022. On April 25, 2022, they were given their official numbers and asked which locality they represented.

On April 27, 2022, Binibining Pilipinas officially announced the withdrawal of three candidates: Gwendoline Soriano of Pangasinan, Francesca Taruc of Angeles City, Pampanga, and Iman Franchesca Cristal of Pampanga. They were replaced by Patricia Ann Tan, Maria Isabela David, and Joanna Rabe resepectively.

=== Format ===
The Binibining Pilipinas organization introduced changes to this edition. The number of semifinalists was reduced to 12, from the previous 13. The results of the closed-door interview and other activities determined the selection of the 12 semifinalists. These had to give an opening statement, followed by the swimsuit and evening gown competitions. Finally they competed in the question and answer portion, after which the four titleholders and two runners-up were announced.

=== Selection committee ===
- Cecilio Asuncion – founder and model director, Slay Model Management
- George Barcelon – president, Philippine Chamber of Commerce and Industry
- Ann Colis – Binibining Pilipinas Globe 2015 and Miss Globe 2015
- Jane de Leon – actress, singer, model, dancer
- Joshua Garcia – actor, dancer, commercial model
- Rico Hizon – broadcast journalist and senior news anchor at CNN
- Maria Ahtisa Manalo – Binibining Pilipinas International 2018 and Miss International 2018 first runner-up
- Alfredo Pascual – secretary of trade and industry
- Ioannis Pediotis – ambassador of Greece to the Philippines

== Results ==
=== Placements ===
Color keys

- The contestant was a runner-up in an international pageant.
- The contestant was a semi-finalist in an international pageant.

Placement	Contestant	International placement
Binibining Pilipinas International 2022	Bb. #23 Cebu – Nicole Borromeo	3rd runner-up – Miss International 2023
Binibining Pilipinas Grand International 2022	Bb. #40 San Pablo, Laguna – Roberta Tamondong	5th runner-up – Miss Grand International 2022
Binibining Pilipinas Intercontinental 2022	Bb. #28 Eastern Samar – Gabrielle Basiano	Top 20 – Miss Intercontinental 2022
Binibining Pilipinas Globe 2022	Bb. #17 Tacloban – Chelsea Fernandez	Top 15 - The Miss Globe 2022
1st runner-up	Bb. #8 Angono – Herlene Budol	
2nd runner-up	Bb. #1 Cainta – Stacey Gabriel	
Top 12	Bb. #5 Iloilo – Karen Mendoza; Bb. #25 Bataan – Anna Lakrini; Bb. #31 Laguna – Yllana Aduana; Bb. #32 Batangas – Anne De Mesa; Bb. #35 Nueva Ecija – Diana Mackey; Bb. #39 Tarlac – Jasmine Omay	

=== Special awards ===
Award	Contestant
Miss Hya-Loo	Bb. #15 Guiguinto – Nyca Bernardo
Miss Spotlight	Bb. #40 San Pablo, Laguna – Roberta Tamondong
Miss Hello Glow	Bb. #5 Iloilo City – Karen Mendoza
Miss Ever Organics	Bb. #35 Nueva Ecija – Diana Mackey
Miss Careline	Bb. #23 Cebu – Nicole Borromeo
Miss Blackwater	Bb. #8 Angono – Herlene Budol
Miss Ever Bilena	Bb. #17 Tacloban – Chelsea Fernandez
Miss Kumu People's Choice	Bb. #5 Iloilo City – Karen Mendoza
Miss Kumu Question	Bb. #38 La Union – Ethel Abellanosa
Best in National Costume	Bb. #7 Oriental Mindoro – Graciella Lehmann
Best in Talent	Bb. #18 Mexico, Pampanga – Maria Isabella David
Face of Binibini (Miss Photogenic)	Bb. #31 Laguna – Yllana Aduana
Bb. Friendship	Bb. #37 Catanduanes – Eiffel Rosalita
Bb. Philippine Airlines	Bb. #40 San Pablo City – Roberta Tamondong
Manila Bulletin Readers' Choice	Bb. #8 Angono – Herlene Budol
Bb. Shein	Bb. #8 Angono – Herlene Budol
Bb. Moist Diane Shampoo	Bb. #5 Iloilo City – Karen Mendoza
Bb. Pizza Hut	Bb. #8 Angono – Herlene Budol
Bb. Kumu	Bb. #8 Angono – Herlene Budol
Jag Queen	Bb. #8 Angono – Herlene Budol
Bb. Silka	Bb. #8 Angono – Herlene Budol
Bb. Ever Bilena	Bb. #17 Tacloban – Chelsea Fernandez
Bb. World Balance	Bb. #8 Angono – Herlene Budol
Best in Swimsuit	Bb. #28 Eastern Samar – Gabrielle Basiano
Best in Evening Gown	Bb. #28 Eastern Samar – Gabrielle Basiano

== Contestants ==
Forty contestants competed for the four titles.

No.	Locality	Contestant	Age (Note: Ages at the time of the pageant)
1	Cainta	Stacey Gabriel	24
2	Camarines Sur	Krizzia Lynn Moreno	26
3	Taguig	Diana Pinto	24
4	Carcar	Jane Darren Genobisa	25
5	Iloilo	Karen Laurrie Mendoza	26
6	Davao del Sur	Elda Louise Aznar	26
7	Oriental Mindoro	Graciella Sheine Lehmann	24
8	Angono	Herlene Budol	22
9	Samar	Natasha Jung	18
10	Sarangani	Fatima Kate Bisan	22
11	Misamis Oriental	Esel Mae Pabillaran	26
12	Sultan Kudarat	Leslie Avila	19
13	Masbate City	Patricia Tan	26
14	Bulacan	Joanna Day	23
15	Guiguinto	Nyca Mae Bernardo	22
16	Davao City	Jeriza Uy	25
17	Tacloban	Chelsea Fernandez	23
18	Mexico	Maria Isabela David	20
19	Quezon	Ira Patricia Malaluan	21
20	Iba	Joanna Marie Rabe	26
21	Lipa	Gracia Elizabetta Mendoza	24
22	Davao Oriental	Joanna Ricci Alajar	27
23	Cebu	Nicole Borromeo	21
24	Quezon City	Patricia Samantha Go	26
25	Bataan	Anna Lakrini	24
26	Porac	Cyrille Payumo	25
27	Floridablanca	Jessica McEwen	25
28	Eastern Samar	Gabrielle Basiano	24
29	Marikina	Mariella Esguerra	24
30	Albay	Jashmin Lyn Dimaculangan	25
31	Laguna	Yllana Aduana	23
32	Batangas	Anne De Mesa	23
33	Cavite	Justinne Punsalang	27
34	Zambales	CJ Opiaza	23
35	Nueva Ecija	Diana Mackey	24
36	Negros Oriental	Jannine Navarro	27
37	Catanduanes	Eiffel Janell Rosalita	26
38	La Union	Ethel Abellanosa	25
39	Tarlac	Jasmine Omay	24
40	San Pablo, Laguna	Roberta Tamondong	19
