= Roberta Tamondong =

Filipino model and beauty pageant titleholder

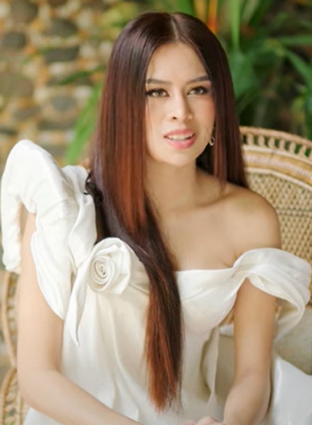
- Tamondong in 2022
- Born: Roberta Angela Santos Tamondong; October 19, 2002 (age 23); San Pablo, Laguna, Philippines
- Education: San Beda University
- Height: 1.75 m (5 ft 9 in)
- Beauty pageant titleholder
- Title: Miss Eco Teen International 2020; Binibining Pilipinas Grand International 2022 assumed
- Years active: 2016 – Present
- Hair color: Black
- Eye color: Brown
- Major competitions: Miss Eco Teen International 2020; (Winner); Binibining Pilipinas 2022; (Winner – Binibining Pilipinas Grand International 2022); Miss Grand International 2022; (5th Runner-Up)

Roberta Angela Santos Tamondong (born October 19, 2002) is a Filipino actress, model, and a beauty pageant titleholder who was crowned Binibining Pilipinas Grand International 2022.

She represented the Philippines at the Miss Grand International 2022 competition held on 25 October 2022 at Sentul International Convention Center in Bogor Regency of West Java province, Indonesia and finished as 5th Runner-Up. She was previously crowned Miss Eco Teen International 2020.

== Pageantry ==
=== Miss Eco Teen International 2020 ===
On November 18, 2020, the Miss World Philippines organization announced on their social media accounts that they have appointed Tamondong as the country's representative for the Miss Eco Teen International pageant.

On December 5, 2020, she represented the Philippines at Miss Eco Teen International in Hurghada, Egypt and won the title. She is the first Filipino to win the title.

=== Binibining Pilipinas 2022 ===
On July 31, 2022, Tamondong represented San Pablo, Laguna at the Binibining Pilipinas 2022 pageant held at the Smart Araneta Coliseum in Quezon City.

At the end of the event, Tamondong was crowned as Binibining Pilipinas Grand International 2022 and succeeding by Samantha Panlilio of Cavite. She also bagged the Miss Spotlight and Bb. Philippine Airlines awards.

=== Miss Grand International 2022 ===
She represented the Philippines at the Miss Grand International 2022 pageant held in Jakarta, Indonesia on 25 October 2022 and finished as a Top 20 semifinalist.

On 30 October 2022, the Miss Grand International Organization appointed Tamondong as one of the 5th Runners-Up of Miss Grand International 2022 after Yuvna Rinishta of Mauritius resigned from the organization.

Awards and achievements
Preceded by Samantha Panlilio (Cavite)	Binibining Pilipinas Grand International; 2022	Succeeded by Nikki de Moura (Cagayan de Oro)
Preceded by (Brazil) Maria Eduarda Valotto	Miss Eco Teen International; 2020	Succeeded by (Vietnam) Bella Vu
Preceded by Mary Daena Resurreccion (Manila)	Miss Eco Teen Philippines; 2020	Succeeded by Tatyana Alexi Austria (Parañaque)
