= Miss Earth Philippines 2018 =

18th Miss Philippines Earth pageant

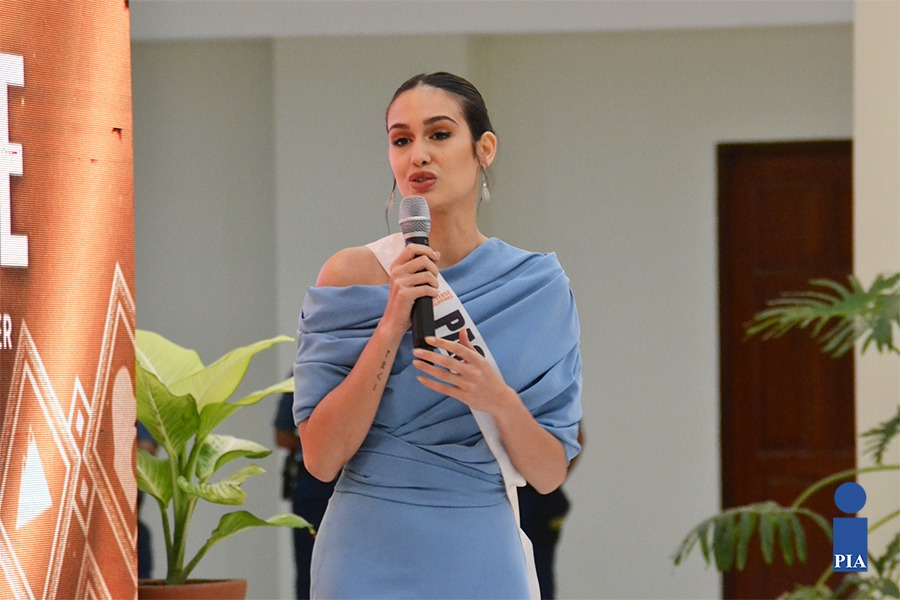
- Celeste Cortesi
- Date: May 19, 2018
- Presenters: Robi Domingo
- Theme: Dyosa ng Inang Kalikasan (transl. "Goddess of Mother Nature" )
- Venue: SM Mall of Asia Arena, Pasay, Metro Manila
- Broadcaster: ABS-CBN
- Entrants: 42
- Placements: 18
- Winner: Celeste Cortesi; Rome, Italy

Miss Earth Philippines 2018, formerly titled Miss Philippines Earth was the 18th edition of the Miss Philippines Earth pageant, held at the SM Mall of Asia Arena in Pasay, Metro Manila, on May 19, 2018.

Karen Ibasco of Manila crowned Celeste Cortesi of Rome as her successor at the end of the event. Cortesi represented the Philippines at the Miss Earth 2018 pageant, and reached the top eight.

== Results ==
=== Placements ===
Placement	Contestant
Miss Earth Philippines 2018	Rome, Italy – Celeste Cortesi
Miss Air Philippines 2018	Las Piñas – Zahra Bianca Saldua
Miss Water Philippines 2018	Balingasag – Berjayneth Chee
Miss Fire Philippines 2018	San Rafael, Bulacan – Jean Nicole de Jesus
Miss Eco Tourism Philippines 2018	Titay – Halimatu Yushawu
Runners-Up	Cebu City – Marla Alforque; Dumaguete – Nathalie Louise Roxas; Taguig – Lovely Lamptey; Queensland, Australia – Theressa Anne Mariano; Vienna, Austria – Brazzirie Yanson
Top 18	Cateel – Marra Cristy Dianne Silvosa; Davao City – We'am Ahmed; Parañaque – Divine Angela Veranga; Sydney – Naomie Hannah White; Tacloban – Gabrielle Basiano; Tagum – Trixie Dadula; Tangalan – Noelle Uy-Tuazon; Zamboanga City – Joanna Krystel Cabrezos

== Category Results ==
- Top 10 scorers of each preliminary rounds

Beauty of Face and Poise	Beauty of Figure and Form	Intelligence and Environmental Awareness
Rome	Sydney	Tangalan
Balingasag	Mandaluyong	Tacloban
Cateel	Titay	Las Piñas
Queensland	San Rafael	Balingasag
Las Piñas	Cateel	Dumaguete
Tacloban	Taguig	Vienna
Laak	Balingasag	Sydney
Titay	Dinalupihan	Rome
Dumaguete	Queensland	San Rafael
Cebu City	Rome	Cebu City

== Pre-Pageant Events ==
Event	Gold	Silver	Bronze
Resorts Wear Competition (04.21.18)	Cebu City – Marla Alforque	Fil-Rome, Italy – Silvia Celeste Cortesi	Tacloban – Gabrielle Camille Basiano
Trash to Class Competition (04.22.18)	Cebu City – Marla Alforque	Iloilo City – Janeen Dale Geroso	Dinalupihan, Bataan – Lea Macapagal Fil-Alberta, Canada - Aime Leysa
Talent Competition - Dancing Category (04.28.18)	Lipa – Joana Cristine Dalangin	Dinalupihan, Bataan – Lea Macapagal	Laak, Compostela Valley – Princess Faye Fernandez
Cocktail Wear Competition (05.04.18)	Titay, Zamboanga Sibugay – Halimatu Yushawu	Fil-Rome, Italy – Silvia Celeste Cortesi	San Pedro – Aubrey Elauria
Swimsuit Competition (05.04.18)	Fil-Rome, Italy – Silvia Celeste Cortesi	Cateel, Davao Oriental – Marra Cristy Dianne Silvosa	Laak, Compostela Valley – Princess Faye Fernandez
Long Gown Competition (05.07.18)	Balingasag, Misamis Oriental – Berjayneth Chee	Fil-Rome, Italy – Silvia Celeste Cortesi	Titay, Zamboanga Sibugay – Halimatu Yushawu
Talent Competition - Creative Category (05.08.18)	San Rafael, Bulacan – Jean Nicole de Jesus	Mariveles, Bataan – Dianne April Pangilinan	Fil-Sydney, Australia – Naomie Hannah White
Talent Competition - Singing Category (05.08.18)	Las Piñas – Zahra Bianca Saldua	Titay, Zamboanga Sibugay – Halimatu Yushawu	Taguig – Lovely Lamptey
Darling of the Press : Press Presentation (05.10.18)	San Jose del Monte – Leandra Gabrielle Batingan	Las Piñas – Zahra Bianca Saldua	Fil-Rome, Italy – Silvia Celeste Cortesi
Cultural Costume Competition (05.10.18)	Titay, Zamboanga Sibugay – Halimatu Yushawu	Cebu City – Marla Alforque	Balingasag, Misamis Oriental – Berjayneth Chee
Overall Miss Talent Competition (05.12.18)	Taguig – Lovely Lamptey	Las Piñas – Zahra Bianca Saldua	Titay, Zamboanga Sibugay – Halimatu Yushawu

== Awards ==
=== Special awards ===
Special Award (Date)	Representing	Delegate
Miss Laus Group (04.21.18)	Fil-Rome, Italy	Silvia Celeste Cortesi
SM Bean Bag Challenge winner (04.22.18)	General Tinio, Nueva Ecija	Maria Karina Salazar
Miss Hannah's Beach Resort (04.28.18)	San Jose del Monte City	Leandra Gabrielle Batingan
Miss HBR 1st Runner-up	Tacloban City	Gabrielle Camille Basiano
Miss HBR 2nd Runner-up	Taguig City	Lovely Lamptey
Miss SM Markets (05.19.18)	Dinalupihan, Bataan	Lea Macapagal

=== Other Sponsors Awards ===
Hana Beauties (05.10.18)	Candidate
Winner	Balingasag, Misamis Oriental - Berjayneth Chee
Finalists
Finalists	San Rafael, Bulacan - Jean Nicole de Jesus
Finalists	Cebu City - Marla Alforque
Finalists	Cateel, Davao Oriental - Marra Cristy Dianne Silvosa
Finalists	Fil-Rome, Italy - Silvia Celeste Cortesi

== Contestants ==
The following is the list of the official delegates of Miss Earth Philippines 2018 representing various cities, municipalities, provinces, and Filipino communities abroad.

Represented	Contestant	Age	Height	Island Groups/NCR/Int'l Reps
Alberta	Aime Leysa	23	5'5"	North America (Int'l)
Bacolod, Lanao del Norte	Cindy Lynn Clapano	20	5'5"	Mindanao
Balingasag	Berjayneth Chee	18	5'8"	Mindanao
Bantayan Island	Iana Faye Marie Olea	19	5'7"	Visayas
Bien Unido	Abby Ampong	22	5'6"	Visayas
Caloocan	Stephanie Jean Monce	21	5'5"	NCR
Cateel	Marra Silvosa	21	5'6"	Mindanao
Cebu City	Marla Alforque	22	5'5"	Visayas
Davao City	We'am Ahmed	18	5'8"	Mindanao
Dinalupihan, Bataan	Lea Macapagal	20	5'5"	Luzon
Dumaguete	Nathalie Louise Roxas	26	5'4.5"	Visayas
General Tinio	Maria Karina Salazar	22	5'4"	Luzon
Iloilo City	Janeen Dale Geroso	20	5'6.5"	Visayas
Ipil, Zamboanga Sibugay	Krisabelle Aragona	20	5'5"	Mindanao
Kalibo, Aklan	Ronelie Pador	25	5'7"	Visayas
Laak	Princess Faye Fernandez	20	5'5"	Mindanao
Las Piñas	Zahra Bianca Saldua	26	5'7.5"	NCR
Lipa	Joana Cristine Dalangin	22	5'7.5"	Luzon
Malinao, Albay	Marjorie Vista	22	5'6"	Luzon
Malvar	Collin Tolentino	25	5'7"	Luzon
Mandaluyong	Flordeliz Mabao	19	5'7"	NCR
Mariveles	Dianne April Pangilinan	22	5'6"	Luzon
Parañaque	Ma. Divine Angela Veranga	25	5'7"	NCR
Passi	Ann Roxal Palmares	19	5'8"	Visayas
Queensland	Theressa Anne Mariano	21	5'6"	Oceania (Int'l)
Quezon City	Lean Quinto	21	5'4.5"	NCR
Rome, Italy	Celeste Cortesi	20	5'8"	Europe (Int'l)
San Isidro, Davao del Norte	Myrell Martinez	21	5'8"	Mindanao
San Jose del Monte	Leandrea Gabrielle Batingan	18	5'7"	Luzon
San Pedro	Aubrey Elauria	19	5'4.5"	Luzon
San Rafael, Bulacan	Jean Nicole de Jesus	25	5'5.5"	Luzon
Santa Cruz, Davao del Sur	Julia Nicole Culaste	22	5'5"	Mindanao
Santa Cruz, Marinduque	Annalea Rabe	20		Luzon
Sydney	Naomie Hannah White	22	5'6"	Oceania (Int'l)
Tacloban	Gabrielle Camille Basiano	20	5'9"	Visayas
Taguig	Lovely Lamptey	22	5'5"	NCR
Tagum	Trixie Dadula	18	5'6"	Mindanao
Tangalan, Aklan	Noelle Uy-Tuazon	26	5'5"	Visayas
Titay	Halimatu Yushawu	22	5'5"	Mindanao
Vienna	Brazzirie Yanson	25	5'7"	Europe (Int'l)
Washington	Jasmine Marie Taylor	20	5'8"	North America (Int'l)
Zamboanga City	Joanna Krystel Cabrezos	23	5'5"	Mindanao
