= Samantha Bernardo =

Filipino gymnast and television personality (born 1992)

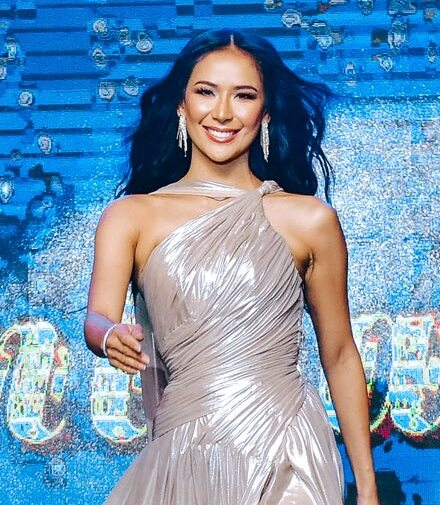
- Bernardo in 2025
- Born: Samantha Mae Adaliga Bernardo; November 10, 1992 (age 33); Puerto Princesa, Palawan, Philippines
- Education: International Hospitality Management
- Alma mater: Palawan State University
- Height: 1.72 m (5 ft 7 1/2 in)
- Spouse: Scott Moore (m. 2024)
- Beauty pageant titleholder
- Title: Binibining Pilipinas Grand International 2020
- Major competitions: Miss World Philippines 2013; (Top 13); (Best in Talent); Binibining Pilipinas 2018; (2nd Runner-Up); (Readers' Choice Award); Binibining Pilipinas 2019; (2nd Runner-Up) (Note: Appointed as Binibining Pilipinas Grand International 2020); (Miss Blackwater); Miss Grand International 2020; (1st Runner-Up)
- Website: linky.ph/samantha

Samantha Mae Adaliga Bernardo-Moore (born November 10, 1992) is a Filipino television personality, host and beauty pageant titleholder who was appointed as Binibining Pilipinas Grand International 2020. She represented the Philippines at the Miss Grand International 2020 pageant in Bangkok, Thailand and placed 1st Runner-Up.

== Personal life ==
Samantha Mae Adaliga Bernardo was born in Puerto Princesa, Palawan after from San Juan, Metro Manila when she was eight; she carried the banner of her hometown twice in the Binibining Pilipinas pageant in 2018 and 2019. She was a gymnast and competed in MIMAROPA Regional Athletics Meet where she won 5 gold medals and was hailed as the competition's overall champion. She represented Palawan in national meets. She is a graduate of International Hospitality Management at the Palawan State University. She is also a licensed Financial Advisor. She is also the spokesperson of the Philippine Movement Against Malaria and joined David Beckham on the campaign.

On February 20, 2023, Bernardo announced her engagement to her non-showbiz partner Scott Moore in Japan during the week of Valentine's Day. The partners had an engagement photo shoot at The Lacson Ruins in Talisay, Negros Occidental.

On April 12, 2024, Bernardo, wearing a Yeye Pantaleon halter pearl-white neck bridal gown styled by Tei Endencia assisted by hairstylist Darwin Siñel with Theia Gems drop earrings, wed Moore, who was in a beige khaki suit at a beach wedding ceremony in Lapu-Lapu City and Sheraton Cebu Mactan Resort in Mactan, Cebu. In January, the couple had an old Hollywood-inspired prenup shoot photos at Las Casas Filipinas de Acuzar and a Barbie-themed bachelorette party.

=== Health ===
On January 9, 2022, just days after her eviction from the Pinoy Big Brother house, Bernardo contracted COVID-19. She tested negative on January 18, 2022.

== Career ==
=== Inside pageantry ===
==== National Pageants ====
Miss World Philippines 2013

At the age of 20, Bernardo competed at the Miss World Philippines 2013 pageant and placed in the Top 13. The eventual winner was Megan Young, who was later crowned as Miss World 2013. In this pageant, she won the Best in Talent award.

Binibining Pilipinas 2018

Samantha joined the Binibining Pilipinas 2018 pageant and finished as 2nd runner-up. She also bagged the Reader's Choice award.

Binibining Pilipinas 2019

Samantha joined the Binibining Pilipinas 2019 pageant, her second time to do so. At the end of the pageant, she was announced as the 2nd runner-up and received the Miss Blackwater special award. Due to the resignation of Miss Grand Philippines 2019 Samantha Ashley Lo, Bernardo was promoted to the 1st runner-up placement as Aya Abesamis assumed the vacated title.

Binibining Pilipinas 2020

Bernardo tried her luck for the third time at the Binibining Pilipinas 2020 but due to the COVID-19 pandemic, the pageant was postponed. She won the Miss Ever Bilena award before the postponement was announced. The Binibining Pilipinas Organization selected her to represent the Philippines at Miss Grand International 2020 in Bangkok, Thailand instead of the current titleholder, Aya Abesamis, who was said to be past the age requirement for the pageant.

==== International pageants ====
Miss Grand International 2020

Bernardo represented the Philippines at Miss Grand International 2020 held in Bangkok on March 27, 2020, where she placed 1st Runner-Up.

During the Top 10 speech her message was:

"Year 2020 will be remembered as the most challenging period in our history. COVID-19 pandemic has brought despair, destruction, and death. Today, our world war has changed from armed conflicts to war on hunger, for better healthcare system, racism, and education. It's an everyday battle that confronts all of us, regardless of who we are and where we are from. As a Malaria Free Philippines spokesperson, I have always lived up to my faith in humanity, cultural understanding, and respect for others. These are what I will continue to stand for if I become your next Miss Grand International. I will be a channel of hope, compassion, and unity; to stand and form and stop any form of violence and war in this world. As we face a COVID-free world, join me as we work together in mending our conflicts and focusing on what truly matters. We are living under one sky so let us all live peacefully where love is our language, humanity is our race, and peace is our lasting legacy to the world."

In the Top 5 question and answer portion, they were asked with the following question: "With the current COVID-19 situation, what would you choose between: shutting down the country for the safety of the people knowing that the country and its economy will be deeply affected, or would you open up the country to keep the economy running taking the risk of COVID-19 infections and the consequences?" She replied:

"I will always choose the people, because without its people, a country will never be a country. We will never be Philippines without Filipinos, you will never be Thailand without Thai. So it is a must that we should take care of our people first. I stand here for love and peace and unity because there will always be a solution no matter what our problems in this life. And I think if we come together as people, as one united world, then we can have a better place to live in. I hope after this pandemic COVID-19 happened, we can be a better citizens."

Because of the even scores of the candidates, Miss Grand International president, Nawat Itsaragrisil decided to ask one more question. The final question was: "There's only one dose of COVID-19 vaccine left. And you have to choose who to give it to either between a 15-year-old or a senior citizen of 70 years old. Who would you choose to give it to and why?"" Her response was:

"My heart goes to senior citizen because my mom is turning senior citizen, and I experienced the loss of my dad four years ago and I cannot afford to lose my mom. My heart goes to them because they are the most vulnerable during this time. A 15-year-old has the stamina to fight the COVID-19 pandemic and with proper exercise and healthy living, they can live with it. I know as well that every citizen here will choose, and never afford to lose their parents. And so, I will choose senior citizen."

==== 57th Binibining Pilipinas ====
Prior to the 57th Binibining Pilipinas in 2021, Bernardo collaborated with 2016 Miss Grand International runner-up and pageant co-host Nicole Cordoves for a photo shoot. She opened the pageant preliminaries, and crowned her successor, Samantha Panlilio, as Binibining Pilipinas Grand International 2021.

==== Binibining Pilipinas 2022 ====
Bernardo, Catriona Gray, Nicole Cordoves and Edward Barber co-hosted Binibining Pilipinas 2022.

=== Outside pageantry ===
In October 2021, Bernardo was announced as an official housemate in the Celebrity Edition of Pinoy Big Brother: Kumunity Season 10. On January 1, 2022, Bernardo failed to clinch the last spot in Top 2, finishing in the 3rd position to conclude the Celebrity Edition. However, with one of the Celebrity Kumunity Top 2 withdrawing from the competition due to prior commitments, Bernardo replaced volleyball player and fellow housemate Alyssa Valdez and became the Top 2 finalist. At the big night on May 29, 2022 (where she was one of the Big 5), she was named as third placer, winning the 300,000 peso prize. Singer and actress Anji Salvacion was named the season's Ultimate Big Winner, winning the 2,000,000 peso grand prize.

She is currently one of the hosts of PIE Channel, the Philippines' first multiscreen and real-time interactive entertainment channel.

== Filmography ==
Television

Year	Title	Role	Notes	Source
2021–2022	Pinoy Big Brother: Kumunity Season 10	Herself	Housemate; 3rd Big Placer	
2022–2023	PIE Galingan	Co-Host		
2022	PIEnalo Pinoy Games: Sinong Manok Mo	Player	with Nicole Cordoves	
2023	PIEnalo	Co-Host		

== Notes ==
Awards and achievements
Preceded by (Mexico) María Malo	Miss Grand International (1st Runner-Up); 2020	Succeeded by (Ecuador) Andrea Aguilera
Preceded by Aya Abesamis (Pasig)	Miss Grand Philippines; 2020	Succeeded by Samantha Panlilio (Cavite)
