= Francesca Taruc =

Filipino television personality

- Born: Maria Francesca Guina Taruc; May 21, 1998 (age 28); Angeles City, Pampanga, Philippines
- Education: Holy Angel University (Mass Communication)
- Height: 1.70 m (5 ft 7 in)
- Children: 1
- Beauty pageant titleholder
- Title: Miss Freedom of the World Philippines 2018; Miss Tourism World Intercontinental 2019
- Years active: 2018–present
- Hair color: Black
- Eye color: Dark Brown
- Major competitions: Binibining Pilipinas 2021 (Top 13); Binibining Pilipinas 2022 (Withdrew)

Maria Francesca Guina Taruc (Tagalog pronunciation: [tɐˈɾuk]; born May 21, 1998) is a Filipino actress, TV host, model and Miss Freedom of the World Philippines 2018. A year later, she brought home the first crown of the Philippines in the Miss Tourism World Intercontinental 2019 pageant held in Nanjing, China.

== Personal life ==
Maria Francesca Guina Taruc hails from Angeles City, Pampanga and graduated from Holy Angel University with a degree in Mass Communication. She is the granddaughter of Luis Taruc, who led Hukbalahap guerrilla operations against Japanese occupation.

Taruc previously dated Luis Christian Singson, son of Ilocos Sur politician Chavit Singson, with whom she has a son named Luis Ethan (born December 23, 2022).

== Filmography ==
=== Television ===
| Year | Title | Role | Notes |
|---|---|---|---|
| 2019 | Minute to Win It | Herself | Contestant |
| 2019 | It's Showtime | Herself | Segment Contestant |
| 2019 | Sahaya | Omboh Putli | Guest Cast |
| 2019 | Wowowin | Herself | Guest Co-Host |
