= Gabrielle Basiano =

Filipino model and beauty pageant titleholder

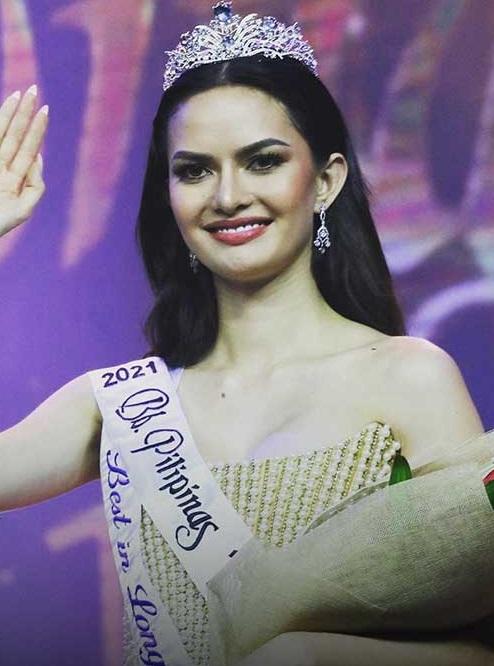
- Basiano in 2021
- Born: Gabrielle Camille Celada Basiano; 17 December 1997 (age 28); Borongan, Eastern Samar, Philippines
- Education: Asian Development Foundation College
- Height: 1.75 m (5 ft 9 in)
- Beauty pageant titleholder
- Title: Binibining Pilipinas Intercontinental 2022
- Major competitions: Miss Earth Philippines 2018; (Top 18); Miss Friendship International 2019; (1st Runner-Up); Binibining Pilipinas 2021; (1st Runner-Up); (Best in Long Gown); Binibining Pilipinas 2022; (Winner – Binibining Pilipinas Intercontinental 2022); (Best in Swimsuit); (Best in Evening Gown); Miss Intercontinental 2022; (Top 20)

Gabrielle Camille Celada Basiano (born 17 December 1997), also known as Gabby Basiano (Tagalog: [ˈgabɪ baˈʃano]), is a Filipino model and beauty pageant titleholder who was crowned Binibining Pilipinas Intercontinental 2022. She represented the Philippines at Miss Intercontinental 2022 in Sharm El Sheikh, Egypt and placed at the Top 20.

== Early life and education ==
Gabrielle Camille Celada Basiano was born in Borongan, Eastern Samar to Manuelito and Mary Basiano. She studied BS Tourism at the Asian Development Foundation College in Tacloban. Binibining Pilipinas Globe 2022 Chelsea Fernandez of Tacloban was her schoolmate.

She considers Miss Universe 2018 Catriona Gray as one of her role models in pageantry and addressing mental health issues as her advocacy.

== Pageantry ==
=== Miss Earth Philippines 2018 ===
On 19 May 2018, Basiano competed at Miss Earth Philippines 2018 and represented Tacloban. During the course of the preliminary events, she won the following awards:

- Bronze Medal for Resorts Wear Competition
- Miss Hannah Beach Resort 1st Runner Up

During the coronation night, Basiano was called to be part of the Top 18 semifinalists while the Filipino-Italian candidate Celeste Cortesi won the crown.

=== Miss Friendship International 2019 ===
On 27 July 2019, Basiano won the Miss Friendship International 2019 first runner-up title in the global pageant held in Chengdu, China in a tie with Lorena Rodrigues of Brazil. She competed against 48 candidates from all over the world, one month after she was crowned as the Philippines' first Ambassador of Tourism. Emilia Dobreva of Serbia won the title for that year.

=== Binibining Pilipinas 2021 ===
Representing Borongan, Basiano won Best in Long Gown and became the first runner-up for the Binibining Pilipinas 2021, which was held at Quezon City on 11 July 2021. Her gown dubbed as "Perla" was designed by Ken Batino and Jevin Salaysay and earned her the Best in Long Gown award. Explaining her choice of the dress, Basiano said:

"I choose to wear a hooded gown dedicated to the current situation our world is facing right now. As the world is covered with uncertainties and challenges, the hood symbolizes the hope of unmasking all our worries, and going forward, towards a pandemic-free world."

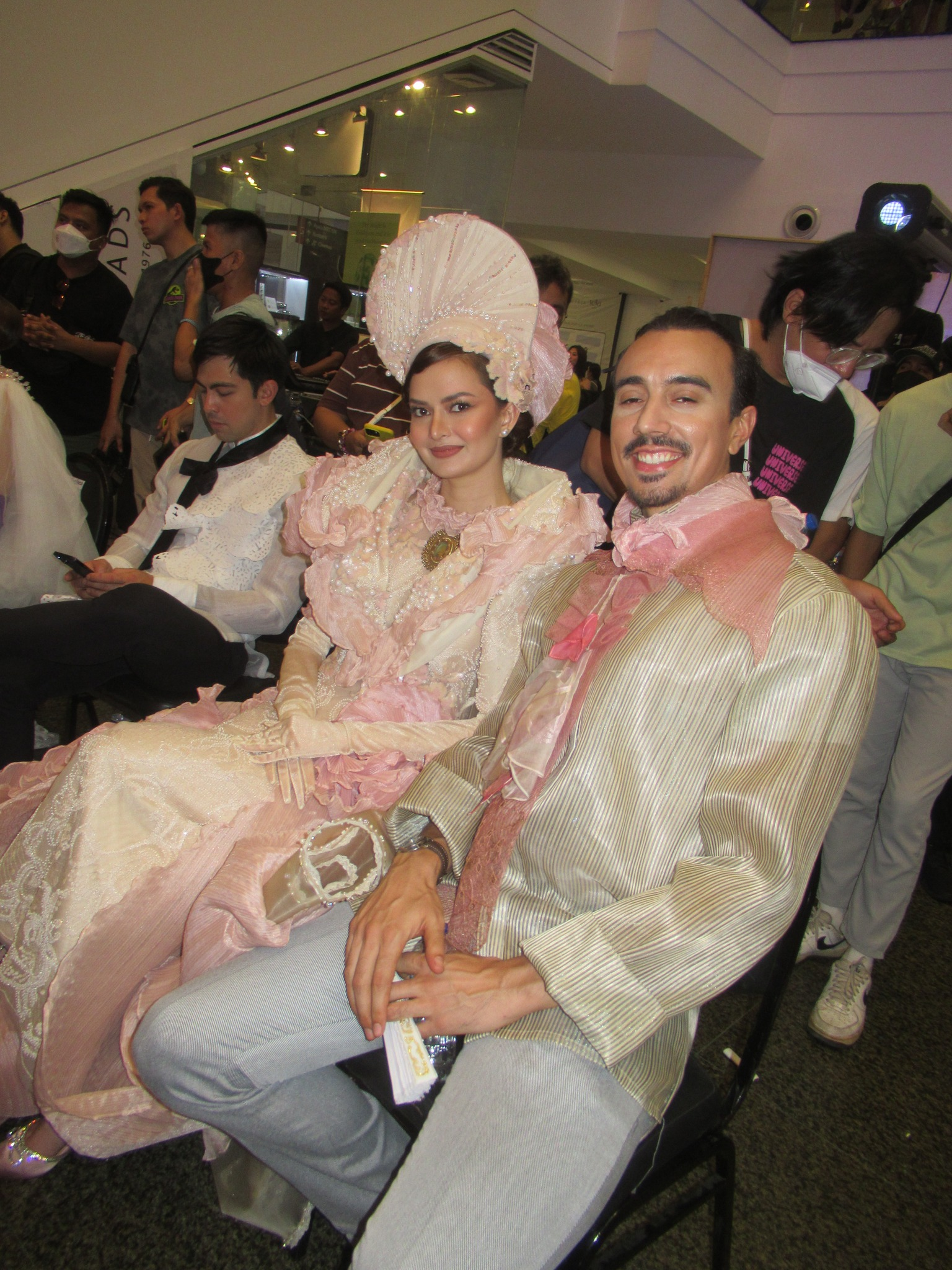
Basiano in 2023

=== Binibining Pilipinas 2022 ===
Returning again for the Binibining Pilipinas 2022 representing Borongan, Basiano won Best in Swimsuit, Best in Evening Gown, and was crowned as Binibining Pilipinas Intercontinental 2022. Nicole Borromeo of Cebu was named as Binibining Pilipinas International 2022, Chelsea Fernandez of Tacloban as Binibining Pilipinas Globe 2022, and Roberta Tamondong of San Pablo, Laguna as Binibining Pilipinas Grand International 2022.

During the question-and-answer portion of the pageant, she was asked by guest panelist Sen. Risa Hontiveros with the following question: "Pageants are a celebration of beauty and goodwill. However, there’s also a lot of toxicity online and offline that fails to empower us, women. If you win as our Binibini, how will you deal with fake news and other negative comments criticizing your looks, intelligence, and the way you live your life?" Basiano answered, saying:

"Good evening, everyone. I have been receiving a lot of opinions from other people and I am not complaining about it because people are entitled of their own opinion. As for me, I will always remind women that we are strong, independent, and courageous because these are the traits that are very critical to the complicated roles that us women play into society. Thank you."

Hours after the coronation, rumors sparked that there was a crown mix-up between Basiano and Nicole Borromeo because of the delayed announcement of Borromeo as winner of Binibining Pilipinas International 2022. Both beauty queens explained in the end that there was no such thing as a mix-up that happened during the coronation.

=== Miss Intercontinental 2022 ===
Basiano represented the Philippines as Miss Intercontinental 2022 in Sharm El Sheikh, Egypt at 14 October 2022, and placed among the Top 20 semi-finalists. However, she did not make it to Top 5.

Awards and achievements
Preceded by Cindy Obeñita (Cagayan de Oro)	Miss Intercontinental Philippines; 2022	Succeeded by Iona Gibbs (Bataan)
Preceded by Maria Andrea Abesamis (Pasig)	Binibining Pilipinas (1st Runner-Up); 2021	Succeeded by Herlene Budol (Angono)
Preceded by Inaugural	Miss Friendship International (1st Runner-up); 2019	Succeeded by (Thailand) Khempraphaluk Jaroenjit
Preceded by Inaugural	Miss Friendship Philippines; 2019	Succeeded by Micah Songco
