= Binibining Pilipinas 2018 =

55th Binibining Pilipinas pageant

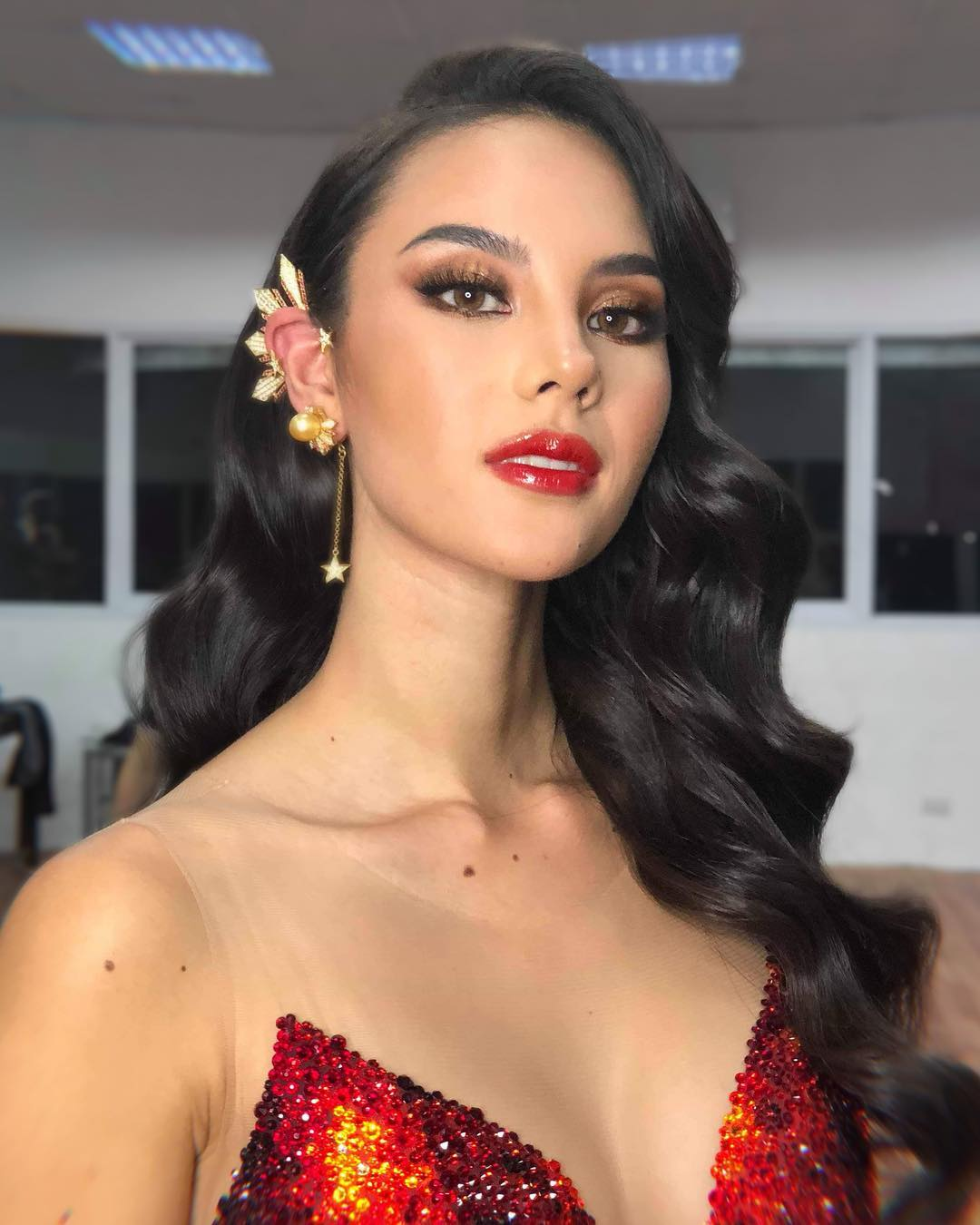
- Catriona Gray, Miss Universe Philippines 2018
- Date: March 18, 2018
- Presenters: Richard Gutierrez; Pia Wurtzbach; Nicole Cordoves
- Entertainment: Iñigo Pascual
- Theme: Celebrating the Art of Beauty
- Venue: Smart Araneta Coliseum, Quezon City, Philippines
- Broadcaster: ABS-CBN
- Entrants: 40
- Placements: 25
- Winner: Catriona Gray; Albay
- Congeniality: Marie Sherry Ann Tormes; Mandaluyong
- Best National Costume: Catriona Gray; Albay
- Photogenic: Eva Psychee Patalinjug; Cebu City

Binibining Pilipinas 2018 was the 55th edition of the Binibining Pilipinas pageant, held at the Smart Araneta Coliseum in Quezon City, Metro Manila, Philippines, on March 18, 2018.

At the end of the event, Rachel Peters crowned Catriona Gray as Miss Universe Philippines 2018, Maria Angelica de Leon crowned Ahtisa Manalo as Binibining Pilipinas International 2018, Chanel Olive Thomas crowned Jehza Huelar as Binibining Pilipinas Supranational 2018, Elizabeth Clenci crowned Eva Patalinjug as Binibining Pilipinas Grand International 2018, Katarina Rodriguez crowned Karen Gallman as Binibining Pilipinas Intercontinental 2018, and Nelda Ibe crowned Michele Gumabao as Binibining Pilipinas Globe 2018. Vickie Rushton was named 1st Runner-Up and Samantha Bernardo was named 2nd Runner-Up.

This pageant marks the emerald edition of the Binibining Pilipinas pageant. To mark the occasion, new crowns were designed for the incoming titleholders, and, for the first time, crowns were also awarded to the first and second runners-up.

== Results ==
=== Placements ===
Color keys

- The contestant won in an International pageant.
- The contestant was a Finalist/Runner-up in an International pageant.
- The contestant was a Semi-Finalist in an International pageant.
- The contestant did not place.

Placement	Contestant	International placement
Miss Universe Philippines 2018	Bb. #20 – Catriona Gray	Winner – Miss Universe 2018
Binibining Pilipinas International 2018	Bb. #17 – Ahtisa Manalo	1st Runner-Up – Miss International 2018
Binibining Pilipinas Supranational 2018	Bb. #31 – Jehza Mae Huelar	Top 10 – Miss Supranational 2018
Binibining Pilipinas Grand International 2018	Bb. #32 – Eva Patalinjug	Unplaced – Miss Grand International 2018
Binibining Pilipinas Intercontinental 2018	Bb. #38 – Karen Gallman	Winner – Miss Intercontinental 2018
Binibining Pilipinas Globe 2018	Bb. #19 – Michele Gumabao	Top 15 – The Miss Globe 2018
1st Runner-Up	Bb. #1 – Vickie Rushton	
2nd Runner-Up	Bb. #14 – Samantha Bernardo	
Top 15	Bb. #3 – Murielle Adrienne Orais; Bb. #11 – Maria Andrea Abesamis; Bb. #15 – Juliana Kapeundl; Bb. #21 – Anjame Magbitang; Bb. #24 – Edjelyn Joy Gamboa; Bb. #26 – Wynonah Van Joy Buot; Bb. #35 – Sandra Lemonon	
Top 25	Bb. #4 – Ana Patricia Asturias; Bb. #7 – Sigrid Grace Flores; Bb. #8 – Marie Sherry Ann Tormes; Bb. #9 – Agatha Lei Romero; Bb. #10 – Kayesha Clauden Chua; Bb. #13 – Kristie Rose Cequeña; Bb. #23 – Ena Louis Velasco; Bb. #34 – Mary Joy de Castro; Bb. #37 – Patrizia Mariah Garcia; Bb. #39 – Trixia Marie Maraña	

=== Special awards ===
Award	Contestant	Ref.
Miss Ever Bilena	Bb. #20 – Catriona Gray	
Miss Blackwater	Bb. #19 – Michele Gumabao	
Miss EB Advance	Bb. #3 – Murielle Orais	
Miss Careline	Bb. #1 – Vickie Rushton	
Pitoy Moreno Best in National Costume	Bb. #20 – Catriona Gray	
Miss Jag Denim Queen	Bb. #20 – Catriona Gray	
Manila Bulletin Reader's Choice	Bb. #14 – Samantha Bernardo	
Best in Talent	Bb. #8 – Sherry Ann Tormes	
Miss Friendship	Bb. #8 – Sherry Ann Tormes	
Face of Binibini (Miss Photogenic)	Bb. #32 – Eva Patalinjug	
Binibining PAL	Bb. #3 – Murielle Orais	
Best in Swimsuit	Bb. #20 – Catriona Gray	
Best in Long Gown	Bb. #20 – Catriona Gray	
Miss Cream Silk	Bb. #19 – Michele Gumabao	

== Judges ==
- Edgar Saavedra – Megawide Construction Chairman
- Mike Brown – General Manager, Novotel Manila Araneta Center
- Gerald Anderson – actor
- Alyssa Valdez – volleyball player
- Martin Lopez – Chief Technology Officer, ABS-CBN Corporation
- Thirdy Ravena – Ateneo Blue Eagles basketball player
- H.E. Victor Hugo Echiverri – Colombian Ambassador to the Philippines
- Precious Lara Quigaman – Miss International 2005, actress
- Ces Oreña-Drilon – Head, ABS-CBN Lifestyle Ecosystem, news anchor
- H.E. Sung Kim – Chairman of the Board of Judges, United States Ambassador to the Philippines

== Contestants ==
40 contestants competed for the six titles.

No.	Contestant	Age (Note: Ages at the time of the pageant)	Hometown
1	Vickie Rushton	25	Negros Occidental
2	Katherine Jane Ventura	22	Antipolo
3	Murielle Adrienne Orais	26	Cebu City
4	Ana Patricia Asturias	25	Tacloban
5	Rose Marie Murphy	25	Butuan
6	Janice Roman	25	Manila
7	Sigrid Grace Flores	25	Catanduanes
8	Marie Sherry Ann Tormes	26	Mandaluyong
9	Agatha Lei Romero	23	Quezon City
10	Kayesha Clauden Chua	25	Bicol Region
11	Maria Andrea Abesamis	26	Pasig
12	Janette Roanne Sturm	26	General Santos
13	Kristie Rose Cequeña	26	Santa Rosa, Laguna
14	Samantha Bernardo	25	Puerto Princesa
15	Juliana Kapeundl	26	Balayan
16	Annalita Vizcarra	23	Murcia, Negros Occidental
17	Ahtisa Manalo	20	Quezon
18	Rosantonette Mendoza	26	Mandaluyong
19	Michele Gumabao	25	Quezon City
20	Catriona Gray	24	Albay
21	Anjame Magbitang	19	Hagonoy, Bulacan
22	Sophia Juliann Baino	24	Batangas
23	Ena Louis Velasco	25	Cebu
24	Edjelyn Joy Gamboa	25	Oriental Mindoro
25	Jerelleen Rodriguez	25	Nasugbu
26	Wynonah Van Joy Buot	24	Cebu City
27	Henna Kaizelle Cajandig	25	Sultan Kudarat
28	Angelica Mae Corbe	24	Legazpi, Albay
29	Samantha Kaye Avestruz	20	Leyte
30	Sarah Margarette Joson	24	Manila
31	Jehza Mae Huelar	23	Davao City
32	Eva Patalinjug	23	Cebu City
33	Stephanie Joy Abellanida	22	Cotabato
34	Mary Joy de Castro	22	Davao del Norte
35	Sandra Lemonon	23	Taguig
36	Loren Mar Artajos	27	Ilocos Sur
37	Patrizia Mariah Garcia	24	Cainta
38	Karen Gallman	25	Bohol
39	Trixia Marie Maraña	25	Dumaguete
40	Angelie Aubrey Asuncion	24	Casiguran, Sorsogon

== Notes ==
=== Post-pageant notes ===
- Catriona Gray competed at Miss Universe 2018 in Bangkok, Thailand and won. Karen Gallman also won when she competed at the Miss Intercontinental 2018 pageant in Manila. Gray was the fourth Miss Universe from the Philippines, while Gallman was the first Miss Intercontinental from the Philippines.
- Ahtisa Manalo competed at Miss International 2018 in Tokyo, Japan where she finished as First Runner-Up. On the other hand, Jehza Huelar finished as a Top 10 finalist when she competed at Miss Supranational 2018 in Krynica-Zdrój, Poland.
- Eva Patalinjug competed at Miss Grand International 2018 in Yangon, Myanmar but was unplaced. Patalinjug is currently the National Director of the Hiyas ng Pilipinas pageant, the first national pageant based in Cebu.
- Michele Gumabao competed at The Miss Globe 2018 pageant in Albania where she finished as a Top 15 semifinalist. She also bagged the Miss Social Media and Miss Dream Girl awards. After her stint at Binibining Pilipinas, Gumabao competed at the Miss Universe Philippines 2020 pageant representing Quezon City, and finished as Second Runner-Up.
- Maria Andrea Abesamis competed again at Binibining Pilipinas in 2019 where she finished as First Runner-Up. She then took over the Binibining Pilipinas Grand International 2019 title after the resignation of Samantha Lo. Abesamis was supposed to be the representative of the Philippines at the 2020 edition of Miss Grand International, but was not able to compete internationally due to age restrictions. Furthermore, Samantha Bernardo, Second Runner-Up at Binibining Pilipinas 2019 and candidate at Binibining Pilipinas 2021, was appointed as Binibining Pilipinas Grand International 2020 and withdrew her participation at Binibining Pilipinas 2021. Bernardo became the representative of the Philippines at the Miss Grand International 2020 pageant in Bangkok, Thailand where she finished as First Runner-Up.
