= Celeste Cortesi =

Filipino model, actress and beauty queen (born 1997)

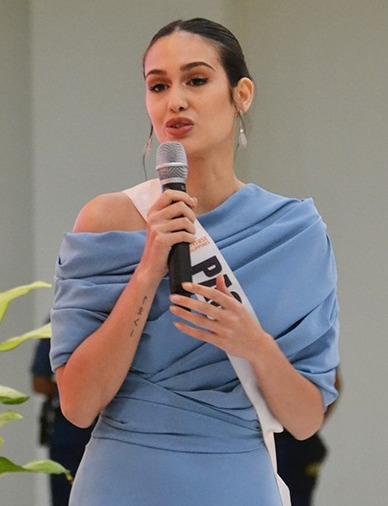
- Cortesi in 2022
- Born: Silvia Celeste Rabimbi Cortesi; December 15, 1997 (age 28); Pasay, Metro Manila, Philippines
- Education: Lyceum of Alabang (BS)
- Occupation: Actress
- Beauty pageant titleholder
- Title: Miss Earth Philippines 2018; Miss Universe Philippines 2022
- Major competitions: Miss Earth Philippines 2018; (Winner); Miss Earth 2018; (Top 8); Miss Universe Philippines 2022; (Winner); Miss Universe 2022; (Unplaced)

Silvia Celeste Rabimbi Cortesi (Tagalog: [tʃɛˈlɛstɛ kɔɾˈtɛsɪ]; born December 15, 1997) is a Filipino model, actress, and beauty pageant titleholder who was crowned Miss Universe Philippines 2022. She represented the Philippines at Miss Universe 2022 in New Orleans, United States. Cortesi was previously crowned Miss Earth Philippines 2018 and represented the Philippines at Miss Earth 2018, where she finished in the top eight.

== Early life ==
Silvia Celeste Rabimbi Cortesi was born on December 15, 1997, in Pasay, Metro Manila, Philippines, to a Filipino mother, Maria Luisa Rabimbi, and an Italian father who was born in Venezuela. Her mother was from Camarines Sur, Bicol, and was also of distant Spanish and Chinese descent. Her parents met at an Italian restaurant in Manila which her father owned and her mother worked at. Cortesi grew up in a multicultural household, exposed to both her Filipino and Italian ancestries.

Cortesi was initially brought up in a neighborhood in Pasay. When she was six months old, her family moved to Parma, Italy, where she spent most of her upbringing. After her father died of a heart attack when she was ten years old, her mother raised both her and her sister as a single parent. As a teenager, Cortesi worked as a model and store cashier in Parma. She would also join several pageants in secret, which her mother discovered and allowed as long as she maintained good grades in school.

Cortesi became interested in pursuing pageantry as a career and exploring her Filipino roots after being informed by her mother of Pia Wurtzbach's win representing the Philippines at Miss Universe 2015, and watching her performance during the event. At 18 years old, she was motivated by Wurtzbach's win to go into pageantry. She moved back to the Philippines in hopes of representing the country in Miss Universe despite only knowing her native Italian and not being fluent in English or Filipino; she eventually learned both languages her own. She stated that she faced discrimination in both Italy and the Philippines because of her heritage and upbringing.

== Pageantry ==
=== Miss Philippines Earth-Italy 2018 ===
Cortesi is the inaugural winner of the Miss Philippines Earth-Italy pageant in Rome. She joined the pageant as she was encouraged by her mother.

=== Miss Earth Philippines 2018 ===
Cortesi represented the Filipino community of Rome, Italy, at Miss Earth Philippines 2018.

On May 19, 2018, she was crowned as Miss Earth Philippines 2018 by the outgoing titleholder Karen Ibasco.

=== Miss Earth 2018 ===
By winning Miss Earth Philippines 2018, she gained the right to represent the Philippines at Miss Earth 2018.

At the end of the competition, she finished as a top eight finalist. Nguyễn Phương Khánh of Vietnam won the said pageant.

=== Miss Universe Philippines 2022 ===
On April 6, 2022, representing Pasay, Cortesi was confirmed as one of the 32 official contestants for Miss Universe Philippines 2022.

At the end of the competition, Cortesi was crowned by outgoing Miss Universe Philippines 2021 Beatrice Gomez as Miss Universe Philippines 2022.

=== Miss Universe 2022 ===
Cortesi represented the Philippines at the 71st edition of the Miss Universe competition but was unplaced, officially ending the Philippines' twelve-year streak of consecutive placements in Miss Universe, from 2010 through 2021. R'Bonney Gabriel of the United States won the said pageant.

== Philanthropy ==
In 2025, Cortesi donated Ph₱10 million (about US$172,000) to victims of the 2025 Cebu and Davao Oriental earthquakes.

== Personal life ==
Cortesi was in a relationship with association football player Mathew Custodio of United City F.C. She has residences in Taguig and Pasay.

Cortesi is concurrently completing her Bachelor of Science degree in real estate management from the Lyceum of Alabang in Muntinlupa, and pursuing her Philippine real estate license.

In April 2026, Cortesi announced that she was expecting her first child with her partner, British entrepreneur Jonathan Sterling. Cortesi and Sterling revealed in September 2026 that they have broken up and will co-parent their future child.

== Acting career ==
On February 10, 2023, Cortesi made her acting debut in the finale episode of Philippine superhero television series, Darna, as Queen Kevnar of Marte.

On July 20, 2023, she signed a contract with Sparkle GMA Artist Center, joining the roster of GMA Network's talents.

== Filmography ==
=== Television ===
Year	Title	Role	Note	Ref.
2023	Darna	Queen Kevnar	Guest role	
2023	Pepito Manaloto: Tuloy Ang Kwento	Bianca	Guest role	
2024	Walang Matigas na Pulis sa Matinik na Misis	Diana "Diamond Ricci" Mondejar	Guest role	
2024	Encantadia Chronicles: Sang'gre	Hera Juvila	Guest role	

Awards and achievements
Preceded by Beatrice Gomez (Cebu City)	Miss Universe Philippines; 2022	Succeeded by Michelle Dee (Makati)
Preceded by Karen Ibasco (Manila)	Miss Earth Philippines; 2018	Succeeded by Janelle Tee (Pasig)
