= Binibining Pilipinas 1991 =

- Date: March 3, 1991
- Presenters: Apa Ongpin; Tina Revilla
- Venue: Araneta Coliseum, Quezon City, Philippines
- Broadcaster: GMA Network
- Entrants: 33
- Placements: 10
- Winner: Anjanette Abayari
- Congeniality: Maria Lorena Andan
- Photogenic: Maria Lourdes Gonzales

Binibining Pilipinas 1991 was the 28th edition of Binibining Pilipinas. It took place at the Araneta Coliseum in Quezon City, Metro Manila, Philippines on March 3, 1991.

At the end of the event, Germelina Padilla crowned Anjanette Abayari as Binibining Pilipinas Universe 1991, Jennifer Pingree crowned Maria Patricia Betita as Binibining Pilipinas International 1991, and Precious Tongko crowned Maria Lourdes Gonzalez as Binibining Pilipinas Maja 1991. Selina Manalad was named first runner-up, while Jenette Fernando was named second runner-up.

Later that year, Anjanette Abayari relinquished her title due to citizenship issues and was replaced by Maria Lourdes Gonzales as Binibining Pilipinas Universe 1991. Selina Manalad assumed the title of Binibining Pilipinas Maja 1991, Jenette Fernando assumed the first runner-up position while Anna Marie Torres, one of the twelve semi-finalists, assumed the second runner-up position.

== Results ==
Color keys

- The contestant was a semi-finalist in an International pageant.
- The contestant did not place.

| Placement | Contestant | International placement |
|---|---|---|
| Binibining Pilipinas Universe 1991 | Bb. #3 – Anjanette Abayari | Resigned due to citizenship issues |
| Binibining Pilipinas International 1991 | Bb. #33 – Maria Patricia Betita | Top 15 – Miss International 1991 |
| Binibining Pilipinas Maja 1991 | Bb. #34 – Maria Lourdes Gonzales (Assumed the Binibining Pilipinas Universe 1991 title) | Unplaced – Miss Universe 1991 |
| 1st runner-up | Bb. #31– Selina Manalad (Assumed the Binibining Pilipinas Maja 1991 title) | Unplaced – Miss Maja International 1991 |
| 2nd runner-up | Bb. #22 – Jenette Fernando (Assumed the first runner-up position) | |
| Top 12 | Bb. #4 – Mary Catherine Mejorada; Bb. #11 – Cristina Esguerra; Bb. #13 – Maria Diwana Espinosa; Bb. #15 – Johanna Erika Medina; Bb. #21 – Ana Virgina Urquiola; Bb. #23 – Seniaflor Sanchez; Bb. #32 – Anna Marie Torres (Assumed the second runner-up position) | |

=== Special awards ===
| Award | Contestant |
|---|---|
| Miss Photogenic/AGFA | Bb. #34 – Maria Lourdes Gonzales |
| Miss Friendship | Bb. #24 – Maria Lorena Andan |
| Miss Talent | Bb. #7 – Gregoria Dayupay |
| Best In Swimsuit | Bb. #34 – Maria Lourdes Gonzales |
| Best In Evening Gown | Bb. #31 – Selina Manalad |
| Miss Rejoice Beautiful Hair | Bb. #22– Jenette Fernando |
| Miss Camay | Bb. #3 – Anjanette Abayari |

== Contestants ==
Thirty-four contestants competed for the three titles.

| No. | Contestant | Age (Note: Ages at the time of the pageant) | Locality |
|---|---|---|---|
| 1 | Catherine Banca | 17 | Quezon City |
| 2 | Annaliza Aviles | 22 | Manila |
| 3 | Anjanette Abayari | 20 | Iloilo |
| 4 | Maria Catherine Mejorada | 21 | Davao City |
| 5 | Maria Rossana Gonzales | 19 | Paombong |
| 6 | Rachel Tan Nocum | 20 | Taguig |
| 7 | Gregoria Lani Dayupay | 23 | Pasay |
| 8 | Rosa Victoria Carpo | 19 | Laguna |
| 9 | D'Johanna Ramos | 19 | Santa Cruz, Laguna |
| 10 | Lynette Sudiacal | 17 | Quezon City |
| 11 | Cristina Esguerra | 17 | Cabanatuan |
| 12 | Cherrylyn David | 19 | Quezon City |
| 13 | Maria Diwana Espinosa | 21 | San Juan |
| 14 | Vilma Bautista | 19 | Mangaldan |
| 15 | Johanna Erika Medina | 18 | Quezon City |
| 16 | Norminda Lagos | 20 | Guagua |
| 17 | Abigail Uyyco | 20 | Quezon City |
| 18 | Maria Filipina Sunga | 17 | San Fernando, La Union |
| 19 | Marinella Ralla | 20 | Legazpi, Albay |
| 20 | Emely Serrano | 22 | Angeles City |
| 21 | Ana Virgina Urquiola | 21 | Las Piñas |
| 22 | Jenette Fernando | 20 | Meycauayan |
| 23 | Seniaflor Sanchez | – | Mabalacat |
| 24 | Maria Lorena Andan | – | Quezon City |
| 26 | Maria Urduja Derige | 20 | Asingan |
| 27 | Filipina Tarog | 18 | Valenzuela |
| 28 | Joanne Chua | 22 | Cebu City |
| 29 | Rosalia Pascual | 17 | Malolos |
| 30 | Ana Marie Craig | 17 | Meycauayan |
| 31 | Selina Manalad | 24 | Manila |
| 32 | Anna Marie Torres | 20 | Quezon City |
| 33 | Maria Patricia Betita | 22 | Manila |
| 34 | Maria Lourdes Gonzales | 19 | Parañaque |
| 35 | Maria Corazon Carretero | 24 | Dagupan |
