= Binibining Pilipinas 2021 =

57th Binibining Pilipinas pageant

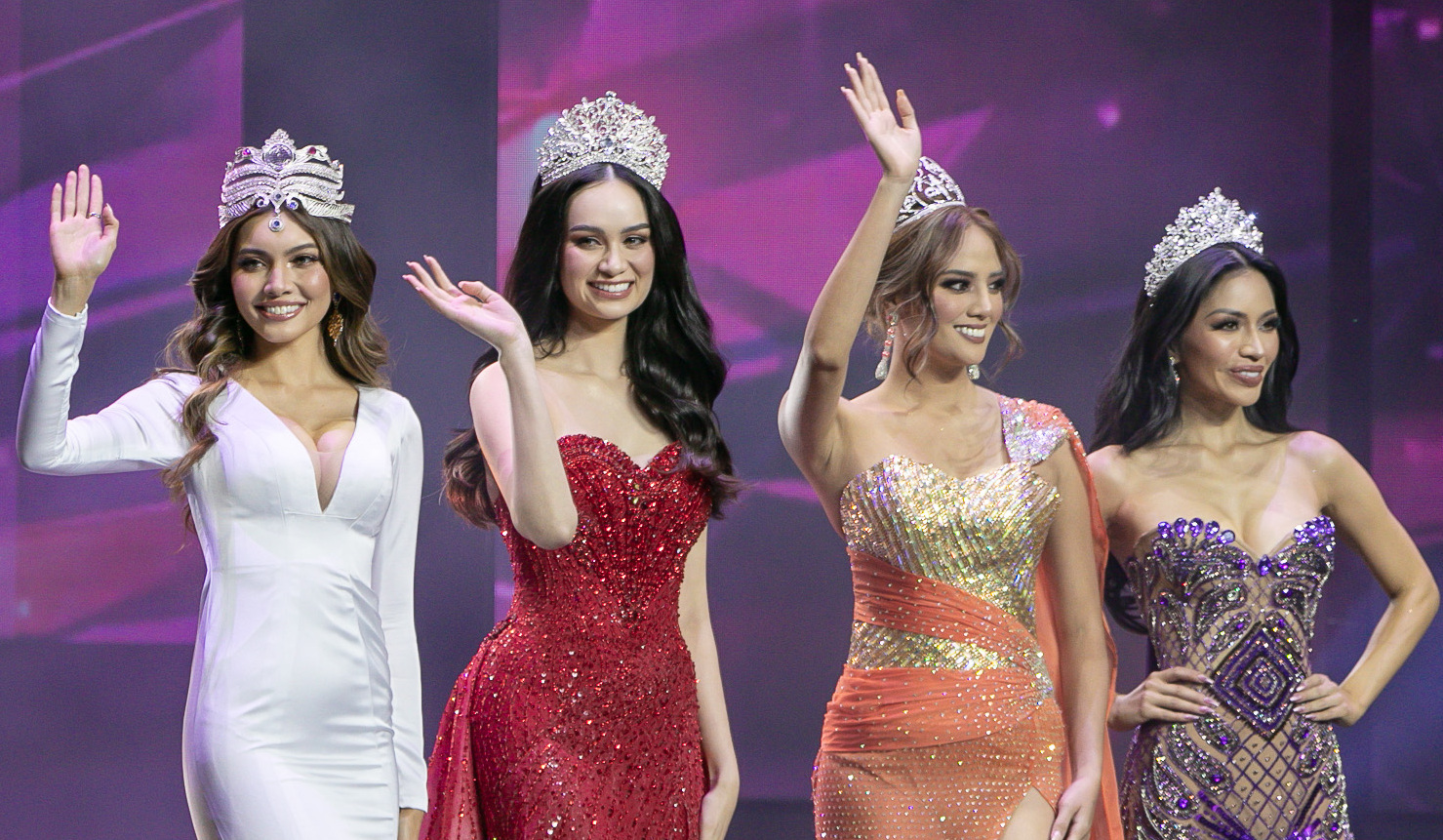
- Maureen Montagne, Hannah Arnold, Cinderella Obenita, and Samantha Panlilio
- Date: July 11, 2021
- Presenters: Catriona Gray; Nicole Cordoves
- Entertainment: Darren Espanto
- Venue: Smart Araneta Coliseum, Quezon City, Metro Manila, Philippines
- Broadcaster: ABS-CBN; ZOE TV
- Entrants: 34
- Placements: 13
- Withdrawals: Guiguinto, Bulacan; Negros Occidental; Nueva Ecija; Palawan; Pasig City; Pototan, Iloilo
- Winner: Hannah Arnold; Masbate
- Congeniality: Lesley Anne Ticaro; Tagum
- Best National Costume: Maria Ruth Erika Quin; Nueva Ecija
- Photogenic: Patrizia Mariah Garcia; Manila

Binibining Pilipinas 2021 was the 57th edition of Binibining Pilipinas. Originally scheduled to be held in 2020, the coronation night of the pageant was postponed due to the COVID-19 pandemic and was rescheduled to July 11, 2021 at the Smart Araneta Coliseum in Quezon City, Metro Manila, Philippines with Catriona Gray and Nicole Cordoves as presenters. Due to the restrictions caused by the disease at the time of the pageant, several health and safety protocols were implemented to ensure the safety of the artists, candidates, crew and organizers of the event.

At the end of the event, Bea Magtanong and Gazini Ganados crowned Hannah Arnold of Masbate as Binibining Pilipinas International 2021, Maria Andrea Abesamis and Samantha Bernardo crowned Samantha Panlilio of Cavite as Binibining Pilipinas Grand International 2021, Emma Tiglao crowned Cinderella Obeñita of Cagayan de Oro, Misamis Oriental as Binibining Pilipinas Intercontinental 2021, and Leren Bautista crowned Maureen Montagne of Batangas as Binibining Pilipinas Globe 2021. Gabrielle Basiano of Borongan, Eastern Samar was named 1st runner-up and Meiji Cruz of Valenzuela was crowned 2nd runner-up.

Starting this edition, the winners of the Binibining Pilipinas pageant will represent the Philippines in Miss International, Miss Grand International, Miss Intercontinental, and The Miss Globe after losing its franchise for Miss Universe and Miss Supranational.

ABS-CBN broadcast the coronation night via Kapamilya Channel and free-to-air channel A2Z (the latter under a partnership with ZOE TV). The pageant was also simulcast on ABS-CBN's Metro Channel and livestreamed on IWantTFC and YouTube.

== Competition ==
=== Selection committee ===
- Rajo Laurel — Fashion designer
- Pinky Webb — Broadcaster
- Maria Garcia — General Manager of Novotel
- Dioceldo Sy — CEO of Ever Bilena
- Enrique Gil — Actor
- Kylie Verzosa — Miss International 2016
- Liza Soberano — Actress
- Benito Bengzon Jr. — Tourism Undersecretary and Spokesperson

== Results ==
Color keys

- The contestant won in an international pageant.
- The contestant was a semi-finalist in an international pageant.
- The contestant did not place.

Placement	Contestant	International Placement
Binibining Pilipinas International 2021	Bb. #17 Masbate – Hannah Arnold	Top 15 – Miss International 2022
Binibining Pilipinas Grand International 2021	Bb. #1 Cavite – Samantha Alexandra Panlilio	Unplaced – Miss Grand International 2021
Binibining Pilipinas Intercontinental 2021	Bb. #12 Cagayan de Oro, Misamis Oriental – Cinderella Faye Obeñita §	Winner – Miss Intercontinental 2021
Binibining Pilipinas Globe 2021	Bb. #10 Batangas – Maureen Ann Montagne	Winner – The Miss Globe 2021
1st runner-up	Bb. #19 Borongan, Eastern Samar – Gabrielle Camille Basiano	
2nd runner-up	Bb. #7 Valenzuela – Meiji Cruz (Appointed as Miss CosmoWorld Philippines 2022)	Winner – Miss CosmoWorld 2022
Top 13	Bb. #3 Manila – Patrizia Mariah Garcia; Bb. #8 Quezon Province – Patricia Denise Babista; Bb. #15 Iloilo – Karen Laurrie Mendoza; Bb. #23 Albay – Jashmin Lyn Dimaculangan; Bb. #24 Angeles, Pampanga – Maria Francesca Taruc; Bb. #25 Rizal – Honey Grace Cartasano; Bb. #27 Oriental Mindoro – Graciella Lehmann	

§ — Fan Vote Winner

=== Appointed titleholder ===
One of this edition's contestants was appointed to compete internationally who was also a runner-up in the previous edition of Binibining Pilipinas:

Title	Appointed titleholder	International Placement
Binibining Pilipinas Grand International 2020	Palawan – Samantha Mae Bernardo	1st runner-up – Miss Grand International 2020

=== Special awards ===
Award	Contestant
Miss Ever Bilena	Palawan – Samantha Bernardo
Miss Ever Bilena Advance	Bb. #25 Rizal – Honey Grace Cartasano
Miss Careline	Bb. #17 Masbate – Hannah Arnold
Miss Blackwater	Bb. #3 Manila – Patrizia Mariah Garcia
Best in National Costume	Bb. #18 Nueva Ecija – Maria Ruth Erika Quin
Miss Friendship	Bb. #32 Tagum – Lesley Anne Ticaro
Miss Talent	Bb. #11 Bocaue, Bulacan – Vianca Louise Marcelo
Face of Binibini (Miss Photogenic)	Bb. #3 Manila – Patrizia Mariah Garcia
Miss Alagang Silka	Bb. #24 Angeles City – Francesca Taruc
Jag Denim Queen	Bb. #17 Masbate – Hannah Arnold
Miss World Balance	Bb. #29 Olongapo – Alexandra Faith Garcia
Miss Ever Bilena	Bb. #10 Batangas – Maureen Montagne
Miss Pizza Hut	Bb. #15 Iloilo – Karen Laurrie Mendoza
Manila Bulletin Readers' Choice Award	Bb. #31 Agoncillo, Batangas – Micca Rosal
Miss Cream Silk	Bb. #10 Batangas – Maureen Montagne
Best in Swimsuit	Bb. #7 Valenzuela – Meiji Cruz
Best in Long Gown	Bb. #19 Borongan, Eastern Samar – Gabrielle Basiano
Bb. Araneta City	Bb. #24 Angeles, Pampanga – Francesca Taruc

== Contestants ==
Thirty-four contestants competed for the four titles.

No.	Locality	Contestant	Age (Note: Ages at the time of the pageant)
1	Cavite	Samantha Alexandra Panlilio	25
2	Marikina	Lois Anne Badando	23
3	Manila	Patrizia Mariah Garcia	27
4	San Fernando, Pampanga	Arianne Deseree Viardo	25
5	Occidental Mindoro	Princess Kien Guanzon	20
6	Caloocan	Shanon Jumaylh Tampon	24
7	Valenzuela	Meiji Cruz	27
8	Quezon	Patricia Denise Babista	23
9	Mandaluyong	Shaira Marie Rona	22
10	Padre Garcia, Batangas	Maureen Ann Montagne	28
11	Bocaue, Bulacan	Vianca Louise Marcelo	27
12	Cagayan de Oro	Cinderella Faye Obeñita	25
13	Laguna	Alexandra Mae Rosales	25
14	Padada, Davao del Sur	Justine Beatrice Felizarta	27
15	Iloilo City	Karen Laurrie Mendoza	25
16	Balagtas, Bulacan	Kimberly Anne Tiquestiques	21
17	Masbate	Hannah Arnold	25
18	Cabanatuan	Maria Ruth Erika Quin	26
19	Borongan City	Gabrielle Camille Basiano	23
20	Roxas, Isabela	Lovely Mercado	25
21	La Union	Carina Cariño	24
22	Pampanga	Czarina Joy Guiao	21
23	Albay	Jashmin Lyn Dimaculangan	25
24	Angeles	Maria Francesca Taruc	23
25	Rizal	Honey Grace Cartasano	27
26	Arayat, Pampanga	Noriza Mae Valerio	24
27	Oriental Mindoro	Graciella Lehmann	23
28	Romblon	Danica Joy Acuña	27
29	Olongapo	Alexandra Faith Garcia	27
30	Cebu	Mercedes Pair	28
31	Agoncillo, Batangas	Micca Rosal	26
32	Tagum	Lesley Anne Ticaro	27
33	Zamboanga City	Bellatrix Tan	25
34	Sultan Kudarat	Honey Be Parreñas	23
