= Cinderella Obeñita =

Filipino model and beauty pageant titleholder

Cindy Obeñita
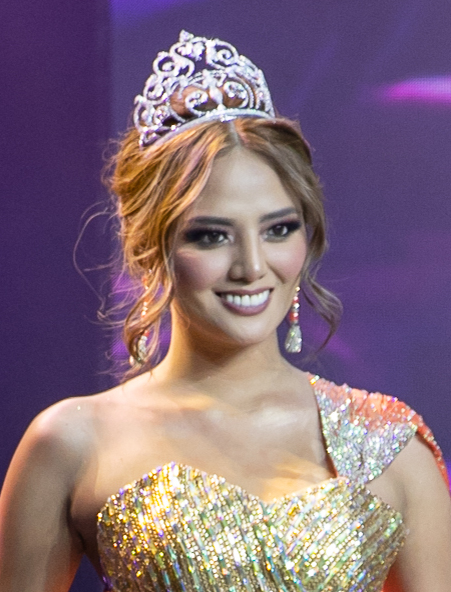
- Obeñita in 2022
- Born: Cinderella Faye Elle Obeñita; January 3, 1996 (age 30); Cagayan de Oro, Misamis Oriental, Philippines
- Other name: Cindy
- Education: Liceo de Cagayan University
- Occupations: Model; beauty pageant titleholder
- Height: 1.70 m (5 ft 7 in)
- Beauty pageant titleholder
- Title: Binibining Pilipinas Intercontinental 2021; Miss Intercontinental 2021
- Hair color: Black
- Eye color: Brown
- Major competitions: Binibining Pilipinas 2021; (Winner – Binibining Pilipinas Intercontinental 2021); Miss Intercontinental 2021; (Winner); (Miss Intercontinental Asia); (Best in Gala Dress); (Popular Vote)

Cinderella Faye Elle Obeñita (Tagalog pronunciation: [ɔbɛˈɲɪtɐ]; born January 3, 1996) also known as Cindy Obeñita is a Filipino model and beauty queen who was crowned Miss Intercontinental 2021 taking place in Egypt on October 29, 2021. Before that, she was crowned Binibining Pilipinas Intercontinental 2021.

On October 15, 2026 she announced her participation at the Miss Universe Philippines 2027 representing Tacloban City.

== Early life and education ==
Obeñita was born on January 3, 1996, and raised in Cagayan de Oro, Philippines. She earned a bachelor's degree in mass communication from the Liceo de Cagayan University. She graduated magna cum laude. Obeñita works as head of the planning and events division of the Provincial Tourism Office in Misamis Oriental. On December 13, 2019, Obeñita took part in a medical mission at the Sacred Heart Parish in Cagayan de Oro, Philippines.

== Pageantry ==
=== Binibining Pilipinas 2021 ===
On 11 July 2021, Obeñita represented Cagayan de Oro at Binibining Pilipinas 2021 in Quezon City, Metro Manila, Philippines. Receiving the most votes online, she won the People's Choice award and automatically earned a spot in the Top 13.

At the end of the event, Obeñita was named Binibining Pilipinas Intercontinental 2021 by Binibining Pilipinas Intercontinental 2019, Emma Tiglao.

=== Miss Intercontinental 2021 ===
On October 29, 2021, Obeñita represented Philippines at Miss Intercontinental 2021 and competed with seventy-one other delegates at the Hotel Sunrise Diamond Beach Resort in Sharm el-Sheikh, Egypt.

At the end of the event, Obeñita won the competition and was crowned as Miss Intercontinental 2021 by the title holder Fanni Mikó from Hungary. Obeñita is the second title holder of Philippines after Karen Gallman won Miss Intercontinental 2018.

Awards and achievements
Preceded by (Hungary) Fanni Miko	Miss Intercontinental; 2021	Succeeded by (Vietnam) Lê Nguyễn Bảo Ngọc
Preceded by (Thailand) Naruemon Khampan	Miss Intercontinental Asia & Oceania; 2021	Succeeded by (Vietnam) Lê Nguyễn Bảo Ngọc
Preceded by Emma Tiglao (Pampanga)	Binibining Pilipinas Intercontinental; 2021	Succeeded by Gabrielle Basiano (Eastern Samar)
