= Samantha Panlilio =

Beauty queen from Philippines

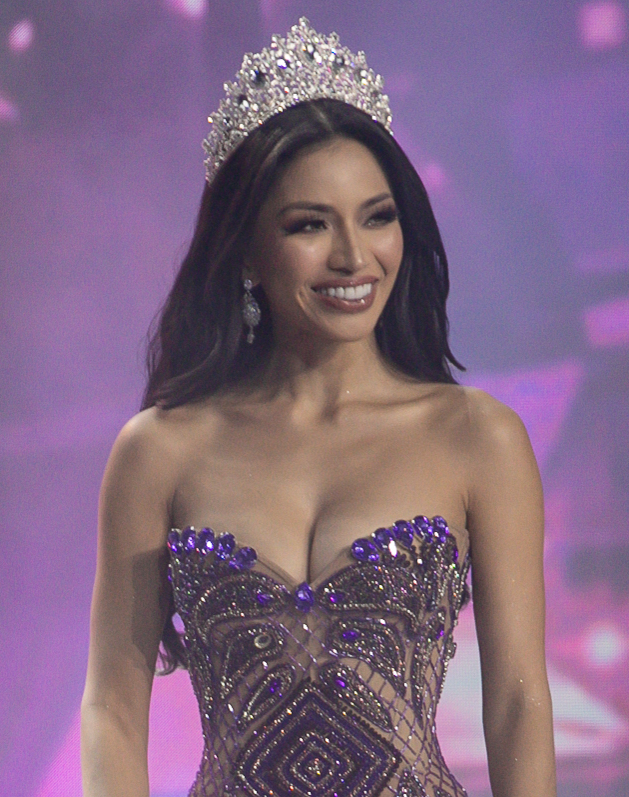
- Samantha Panlilio (2022)
- Born: Samantha Alexandra Aligaen Panlilio; January 13, 1996 (age 30); Makati, Philippines
- Education: Southville International School
- Alma mater: University of California, Irvine (BSc)
- Political party: Agimat Partylist (2024–present)
- Beauty pageant titleholder
- Title: Binibining Pilipinas Grand International 2021
- Years active: 2021–present
- Major competitions: Binibining Pilipinas 2021; (Winner – Binibining Pilipinas Grand International 2021); Miss Grand International 2021; (Unplaced); Miss Universe Philippines 2023; (Top 18)

Samantha Alexandra Aligaen Panlilio is a Filipino media personality, philanthropist, businesswoman and beauty pageant titleholder who was crowned Binibining Pilipinas Grand International 2021 and represented the Philippines in the Miss Grand International 2021 pageant.

In 2023, she competed in the Miss Universe Philippines pageant where she finished in the top 18.

== Early life and education ==
Samantha Panlilio was born in Ternate, Cavite, Philippines. She is the daughter of Jose Marcel Panlilio.

In 2017, Panlilio graduated from the University of California, Irvine with a Bachelor of Science degree in both Business Management and Computer Science.

Panlilio is the Chief operating officer of Boulevard Holdings, Inc., with her father as Chairman and President. BHI owns Friday's Boracay, Puerto Azul Land Inc., and the developer of the Puerto Azul Golf & Country Club.

== Political career ==
Samantha Panlilio ran as the second nominee for the Agimat Partylist in the 2025 House of Representatives elections. She launched the Pangarap at Kalinga Foundation in Ternate for youth empowerment with the construction of two classroom for Ternate West High School.

== Filmography ==
=== Microdrama ===
Year	Title	Role
2026	Romance by the Sea	
