= Binibining Pilipinas 2016 =

53rd Binibining Pilipinas pageant

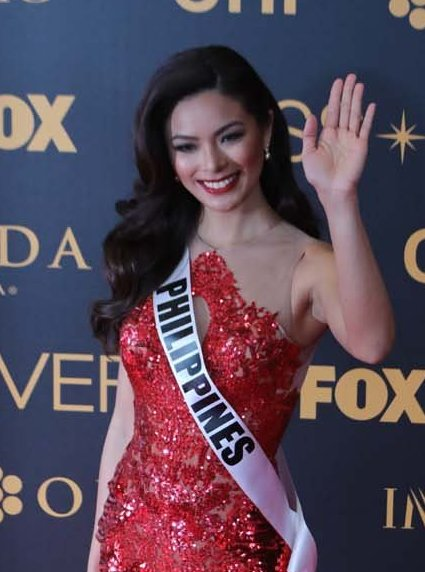
- Maxine Medina
- Date: April 17, 2016
- Presenters: Xian Lim; KC Concepcion; Bianca Guidotti; Kris Tiffany Janson; Laura Lehmann
- Venue: Smart Araneta Coliseum, Quezon City, Metro Manila, Philippines
- Broadcaster: ABS-CBN
- Entrants: 40
- Placements: 15
- Winner: Maxine Medina; Quezon City
- Congeniality: Vina Openiano, Santa Rosa, Laguna
- Best National Costume: Angela Fernando, Lubao, Pampanga
- Photogenic: Kylie Verzosa, Baguio

Binibining Pilipinas 2016 was the 53rd edition of the Binibining Pilipinas pageant, held at the Smart Araneta Coliseum in Quezon City, Metro Manila, Philippines, on April 17, 2016.

At the end of the event, Pia Wurtzbach crowned Maxine Medina as Miss Universe Philippines 2016, Janicel Lubina crowned Kylie Verzosa as Binibining Pilipinas International 2016, Christi McGarry crowned Jennifer Ruth Hammond as Binibining Pilipinas Intercontinental 2016, Rogelie Catacutan crowned Joanna Louise Eden as Binibining Pilipinas Supranational 2016, Parul Shah crowned Nicole Cordoves as Binibining Pilipinas Grand International 2016, and Ann Colis crowned Nichole Manalo as Binibining Pilipinas Globe 2016. Angelica Alita was named first runner-up and Jehza Mae Huelar was named second runner-Up.

== Results ==
=== Placements ===
Color keys

- The contestant won an international pageant.
- The contestant was a runner-up in an international pageant.
- The contestant was a semi-finalist in an international pageant.

Placement	Contestant	International Placement
Miss Universe Philippines 2016	Bb. #29 – Maxine Medina	Top 6 – Miss Universe 2016
Binibining Pilipinas International 2016	Bb. #31 – Kylie Verzosa	Winner – Miss International 2016
Binibining Pilipinas Supranational 2016	Bb. #13 – Joanna Louise Eden	Top 25 – Miss Supranational 2016
Binibining Pilipinas Intercontinental 2016	Bb. #26 – Jennifer Ruth Hammond	Top 15 – Miss Intercontinental 2016
Binibining Pilipinas Grand International 2016	Bb. #11 – Nicole Cordoves	1st Runner-Up – Miss Grand International 2016
Binibining Pilipinas Globe 2016	Bb. #28 – Nichole Marie Manalo	3rd Runner-Up – The Miss Globe 2016
1st Runner-Up	Bb. #38 – Angelica Alita	
2nd Runner-Up	Bb. #37 – Jehza Mae Huelar	
Top 15	Bb. #4 – Kimberly Mae Penchon; Bb. #5 – Riana Agatha Pangindian; Bb. #9 – Roshiela Tobias; Bb. #12 – Edjelyn Joy Gamboa; Bb. #16 – Vina Prulla Openiano; Bb. #22 – Apriel Smith; Bb. #27 – Dindi Joy Pajares	

=== Special awards ===
Award	Contestant	Ref.
Miss Friendship	Bb. #16 – Vina Openiano	
Miss Talent	Bb. #16 – Vina Openiano	
Face of Binibini (Miss Photogenic)	Bb. #31 – Kylie Verzosa	
Best in National Costume	Bb. #3 – Angela Lauren Fernando (designed by Frederick Peralta)	
Miss Philippine Airlines	Bb. #29 – Maxine Medina	
Manila Bulletin Readers' Choice	Bb. #31 – Kylie Verzosa	
Jag She's Got The Look	Bb. #31 – Kylie Verzosa	
Best in Swimsuit	Bb. #13 – Joanna Louise Eden	
Best in Evening Gown	Bb. #26 – Jennifer Ruth Hammond (designed by Nat Manilag)	
Miss Cream Silk	Bb. #28 – Nichole Marie Manalo	

==== National Costume Category ====
- The contestant won the best in national costume award.

Award	Contestant	Designer
Best in National Costume	Bb. #3 – Angela Lauren Fernando	Frederick Peralta
Top 6	Bb. #14 – Paula Rich Bartolome	Joel Acebuche
Top 6	Bb. #19 – Maria Lina Prongoso	Polly Lagyap
Top 6	Bb. #27 – Dindi Pajares	Chery Veric
Top 6	Bb. #32 – Jennyline Malpaya	Jonti Martinez
Top 6	Bb. #38 – Angelica Alita	Bessie Besana

== Judges ==
Binibining Pilipinas 2016 candidates were evaluated by a board of judges:

- Paolo Roxas – youth representative and university student
- Lauren Dyogi – ABS-CBN Head of Television Production
- Cory Vidanes – business executive and ABS-CBN's Chief Operating Officer for Broadcast
- Cherry Soriano – news anchor and former Philippine Ambassador to Qatar
- Betsy Westendorp de Brias – artist
- Amb. Igor Anatolyevich Khovaev – diplomat and the Ambassador of the Russian Federation to the Philippines
- Ian Veneracion – actor, licensed pilot and Philippine representative in the International Paragliding Competition
- Amb. Jan Top Christensen – diplomat, assigned to re-open the Danish embassy in Manila
- Amb. Roland Van Remoortele – career diplomat, the Ministry of Foreign Affairs of Belgium and Ambassador to the Philippines
- Olivia Jordan – actress, model and Miss USA 2015
- Sec. Adrian Cristobal Jr. – graduate of the University of California, Berkeley and Ateneo de Manila and Secretary of the Department of Trade and Industry

== Contestants ==
40 contestants competed for the six titles.

No.	Contestant	Age (Note: Ages at the time of the pageant)	Hometown
1	Gail Doraine Ventic	20	Angeles
2	Alexandra Faith Garcia	22	Zambales
3	Angela Lauren Fernando	24	Lubao
4	Kimberly Mae Penchon	24	Cordillera
5	Riana Agatha Pangindian	19	Pasig
6	Candy del Castillo	21	Bocaue
7	Angelique Celine de Leon	25	Mandaluyong
8	Karen Ibasco	25	Manila
9	Roshiela Tobias	22	Mexico
10	Jeslyn Santos	23	Hagonoy
11	Nicole Cordoves	24	Manila
12	Edjelyn Joy Gamboa	23	Oriental Mindoro
13	Joanna Louise Eden	19	Lucban
14	Paula Rich Bartolome	25	Narvacan
15	Kristine Angeli Estoque	22	Davao City
16	Vina Openiano	23	Laguna
17	Priscilla Kimberley dela Cruz	25	Olongapo
18	Sheena Seinne Dalo	25	Ilocos Norte
19	Maria Lina Prongoso	24	Iriga
20	Geisha de Leon	22	Marilao
21	Jessica Gonzales	25	Bulacan
22	Apriel Smith	20	Cebu City
23	Angela Gene Valdez	24	Meycauayan
24	Niza Sabrina Sophia Limjap	25	Bacolod
25	Anjellica Lopez	20	Manila
26	Jennifer Ruth Hammond	25	Laguna
27	Dindi Pajares	22	Bataan
28	Nichole Marie Manalo	26	Pampanga
29	Maxine Medina	25	Quezon City
30	Crescent Anne Samaco	25	Quezon City
31	Kylie Verzosa	24	Baguio
32	Jennyline Carla Malpaya	24	Marilao
33	Leonalyn dela Cruz	25	Valenzuela
34	Sarah Christine Bona	26	Iriga
35	Mariella Castillo	24	Batangas
36	Maria Gigante	22	Cebu City
37	Jehza Mae Huelar	21	Davao City
38	Angelica Alita	20	Oriental Mindoro
39	Sissel Ria Rabajante	26	Oas
40	Christianne Ramos	25	Marikina

== Notes ==
=== Post-pageant notes ===
- Maxine Medina competed at Miss Universe 2016 in Manila, Philippines where she finished as a top six finalist. Kylie Verzosa competed at Miss International 2016 in Tokyo, Japan, and won.
- Joanna Eden competed at Miss Supranational 2016 in Krynica-Zdrój, Poland where she finished as a top 25 semifinalist.
- Nicole Cordoves competed at Miss Grand International 2016 in Las Vegas, Nevada, where she finished as first runner-up. After Miss Grand International, Cordoves hosted Miss Grand International 2017, and became a co-host of Binibining Pilipinas since 2018.
- Nichole Manalo competed at Miss Globe 2016 where she finished as third runner-up. Initially, Manalo was one of the top 10 finalists but a week after the pageant, together with Natasha Joubert of South Africa, they were announced as third and fourth runner-ups respectively. This was because the emcees of the pageant weren't able to read the envelopes in time.
- Jehza Huelar competed again at Binibining Pilipinas 2017 and Binibining Pilipinas 2018. Huelar finished as a top 15 semifinalist at Binibining Pilipinas 2017 and won Binibining Pilipinas Supranational 2018. Huelar competed at Miss Supranational 2018 in Krynica-Zdrój, Poland where she finished as a top 10 finalist.
- Karen Ibasco won Miss Philippines Earth 2017. Ibasco became the Philippines' fourth winner at Miss Earth 2017 that same year.
- Dindi Pajares competed again at Binibining Pilipinas 2017 and was unplaced. After Binibining Pilipinas, Pajares competed at Miss World Philippines 2021 where she was appointed as Miss Supranational Philippines 2021. She was voted by her fellow contestants as Miss Supranational Philippines 2021 due to the postponement of the finals night. Pajares then competed at Miss Supranational 2021 where she finished as a top 12 semifinalist.
