= Miss World Philippines 2014 =

4th Miss World Philippines pageant

- Date: October 12, 2014
- Presenters: Mikael Daez; Janine Gutierrez; Gwendoline Ruais; Tim Yap
- Venue: Mall of Asia Arena, Pasay, Philippines
- Broadcaster: GMA Network
- Entrants: 26
- Placements: 13
- Winner: Valerie Weigmann; Legazpi
- Congeniality: Kristine Angeli Estoque; Davao City; Christine Balaguer; Boracay
- Photogenic: Nelda Dorothea Ibe, Tarlac City

Miss World Philippines 2014 was the fourth Miss World Philippines pageant, held at the Mall of Asia Arena in Pasay, Metro Manila, Philippines, on October 12, 2014.

Megan Young crowned Valerie Weigmann as her successor at the end of the event. Weigmann represented the Philippines at the Miss World 2014 pageant held in London and finished as a Top 25 semifinalist.

== Results ==
=== Placements ===
Color keys

- The contestant was a semi-finalist in an international pageant.

Placement	Contestant	International Placement
Miss World Philippines 2014	#19 – Valerie Weigmann	Top 25 – Miss World 2014
1st Princess	#1 – Lorraine Kendrickson	
2nd Princess	#20 – Nelda Dorothea Ibe	
3rd Princess	#14 – Nicole Kim Donesa	
4th Princess	#7 – Rachel Peters	
Top 13	#3 – Alexa Rae Kirby; #4 – Priscilla Kimberley dela Cruz; #5 – Gazini Ganados; #6 – Kristine Angeli Estoque; #12 – Christine Balaguer; #13 – Kimberly Anne Sarreal; #16 – Ina Dominica Guerrero; #17 – Kimberly Pajares	

=== Special awards ===
Award	Contestant	Ref.
Best in Long Gown; Best in Swimwear; Best in Fashion Runway; Miss World Camsur; Miss Solaire; Miss Figlia; Jessie Mendez Salon Ambassador; Miss Reducin; Miss Bluewater Day Spa; Miss Bench; Miss Olay; Miss Hana	#19 – Valerie Weigmann	
Miss Sports	#1 – Lorraine Kendrickson	
Miss Photogenic; Miss Organique	#20 – Nelda Ibe	
Miss Friendship (tie)	#6 – Kristine Angeli Estoque	
Miss Friendship (tie)	#12 – Christine Balaguer	
Best in Talent	#21 – Jean Marie Feliciano	
Miss Sun Cellular	#13 – Kimberly Anne Sarreal	
Miss Alluring; Yahoo Readers' Choice	#7 – Rachel Peters	

== Contestants ==
26 contestants competed for the title.

No.	Contestant	Age	Hometown
1	Lorraine Kendrickson	20	Dumaguete
2	Cyra Guilalas	18	Navotas
3	Alexa Rae Kirby	18	Mandaluyong
4	Priscilla Kimberley de la Cruz	24	Olongapo
5	Gazini Ganados	18	Cebu City
6	Kristine Angeli Estoque	20	Davao City
7	Rachel Peters	22	Camarines Sur
8	Rachelle Emmylou Carandang	18	San Jose
9	Ranielah Marie Oval	22	Palawan
10	Grace Ann Bautista	19	Nueva Ecija
11	Moriel Monique Olea	24	Tanauan
12	Christine Balaguer	24	Boracay
13	Kimberly Anne Sarreal	23	Olongapo
14	Nicole Kim Donesa	20	Quezon City
15	Theresa Regli	20	Parañaque
16	Ina Dominica Guerrero	21	Daraga
17	Kimberly Pajares	24	Bataan
18	Ruffa Nava	21	Iloilo City
19	Valerie Weigmann	24	Legazpi
20	Nelda Dorothea Ibe	21	Tarlac
21	Jean Marie Feliciano	22	La Union
22	Abegail Galisim	25	Bacoor
23	Frances Ruth Constantino	23	Malabon
24	Carina Jennah Aguilar	20	Silang
25	Eliza Johanna Cruz	20	Nueva Ecija
26	Jahziel Pernia	20	Marinduque

== Notes ==
=== Post-pageant notes ===
- Valerie Weigmann competed at Miss World 2014 in London and finished as a top 25 semifinalist.
- Rachel Peters and Nelda Ibe competed at Binibining Pilipinas 2017, where Peters was crowned as Binibining Pilipinas Universe 2017 and Ibe was crowned as Binibining Pilipinas Globe 2017. Peters competed at Miss Universe 2017 and finished as a top 10 finalist, while Ibe competed at Miss Globe 2017 and finished as first runner-up.
- Gazini Ganados competed at Binibining Pilipinas 2019 and was crowned as Binibining Pilipinas Universe 2019. Ganados competed at Miss Universe 2019 in Atlanta, Georgia where she finished as a top 20 semifinalist.
