= Reformed Church Windhoek-South =

South African church

The Reformed Church Windhoek-South is the second-oldest of the three Reformed Churches in South Africa (GK) congregations in Windhoek, the capital of Namibia, and the largest of that denomination in the entire country by number of professed members.

Windhoek-South was separated from the Reformed Church Windhoek on 22 October 1988, with the building slated for completion at 64 Schlettwein Street, Pioneers Park. During construction, services were held in the large, luxurious main hall of the Windhoek College of Education. In March 1990, when the newly independent country's government merged the college into the University of Namibia, services moved to the main hall of the local Hoër Tegniese Skool.

Elder Sias Swart moved for the congregation to get its own church. The church council planned a multi-purpose center that could operate seven days a week, seat 700 with a nursery and kitchen. The architect was Theo Heesakkers. The sloped grounds allowed for five catechism classrooms and a one-bedroom apartment to be built under the main hall. The Windhoek Afrikaanse Privaatskool initially held classes on the premises starting in March 1995, before moving in September 1997 to a dedicated building bought by a friendly businessman from the Dutch Reformed Church in South Africa (NGK).

The cornerstone of the Deo Gloria Center was laid in October 1993 and the Center opened a year later. The congregation bought a second-hand organ and used loose chairs rather than pews to facilitate non-service uses.

Windhoek-South has long been the largest GK church in Namibia. Its congregation area more or less encompasses four NGK parishes, Dutch Reformed Church (NHK) Windhoek, Windhoek-East, Windhoek-West, and Windhoek-Eros. The GK had 182 confirmed members at the end of 2014, a 1:19 ratio to the four NGK parishes' combined 3,491 members. Windhoek-South ended 2014 with 331 confirmed members, a 1:7 ratio to the 2,304 members of the three NGK congregations in its general area, namely Academia, Pionierspark, and Suiderhof. At the end of 2013, the ratio was 1:9, but according to the NGK yearbook, Pionierspark and Suiderhof lost 900 members between them over the course of 2014.

== Pastors ==
1. Dr. Wilhelm Carl (Callie) Opperman, 2 April 1989 – 15 October 2017
2. Dr. Jan Andries Erasmus, 2000–2003
3. Lukas Marten Meyer, 2003–2004 (along with Okahandja; left the ministry)
4. Ockert Almero Oosthuizen, 2010–2015
5. Dr. Paul de Bruyn(2017–present)

== Sources ==
- (af) Harris, C.T., Noëth, J.G., Sarkady, N.G., Schutte, F.M. en Van Tonder, J.M. 2010. Van seringboom tot kerkgebou: die argitektoniese erfenis van die Gereformeerde Kerke ("From lilac to church: the architectural heritage of the Reformed Church"). Potchefstroom: Administratiewe Buro.
- (en) Potgieter, D.J. (hoofred.) Standard Encyclopaedia of Southern Africa. Cape Town: Nasionale Opvoedkundige Uitgewery Ltd., 1973.
- (en) Raper, P.E. 1987. Dictionary of South African Place Names. Johannesburg: Lowry Publishers.
- (af) Schalekamp, ds. M.E. (voorsitter: redaksiekommissie). 2001. Die Almanak van die Gereformeerde Kerke in Suid-Afrika ("Almanac of the Reformed Churches in South Africa") vir die jaar 2002. Potchefstroom: Administratiewe Buro.
- (af) Van der Walt, dr. S.J. (voorsitter: deputate almanak). 1997. Die Almanak van die Gereformeerde Kerke in Suid-Afrika vir die jaar 1998. Potchefstroom: Administratiewe Buro.
- (af) Venter, ds. A.A. (hoofred.) 1957. Almanak van die Gereformeerde Kerk in Suid-Afrika vir die jaar 1958. Potchefstroom: Administratiewe Buro.
- (af) Venter, ds. A.A. (hoofred.) 1958. Almanak van die Gereformeerde Kerk in Suid-Afrika vir die jaar 1959. Potchefstroom: Administratiewe Buro.
- (af) Vogel, Willem (red.). 2014. Die Almanak van die Gereformeerde Kerke in Suid-Afrika vir die jaar 2015. Potchefstroom: Administratiewe Buro.
