= Gazini Ganados =

Filipino model and beauty pageant titleholder (born 1995)

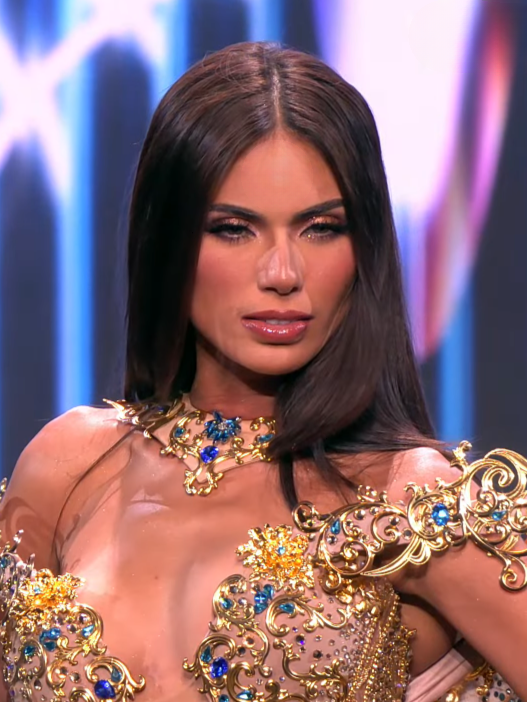
- Ganados in 2026
- Born: Gazini Christiana Jordi Acopiado Ganados; December 26, 1995 (age 30); Dapitan, Zamboanga del Norte, Philippines
- Education: University of San Jose–Recoletos (BS)
- Occupation: Model
- Height: 5 ft 9 in (1.75 m)
- Beauty pageant titleholder
- Title: Miss Universe Philippines 2019
- Hair color: Black
- Eye color: Brown
- Major competitions: Miss World Philippines 2014; (Top 13); Binibining Pilipinas 2019; (Winner – Miss Universe Philippines 2019); Miss Universe 2019; (Top 20); MGI All Stars 1st Edition; (Top 5)

Gazini Christiana Jordi Acopiado Ganados (Tagalog: [gaˈsinɪ gaˈnɐdɔs]; born December 26, 1995) is a Filipino beauty pageant titleholder who won Miss Universe Philippines 2019. She represented the Philippines at the Miss Universe 2019 pageant where she placed in the Top 20 and won the Best National Costume Award.

Ganados previously competed in Miss World Philippines 2014 where she placed in the Top 13. At Binibining Pilipinas 2019, she won the main title which allowed her to represent the Philippines at Miss Universe. She was the last Binibining Pilipinas winner to compete in that pageant before the national Miss Universe title was transferred to a standalone organization.

Ganados later competed in the first edition of MGI All Stars (2026) where she placed in the Top 5.

== Early life and education ==
Gazini Christiana Jordi Acopiado Ganados was born in Dapitan, Zamboanga del Norte, Philippines, to a domestic partnership between her Palestinian father and Filipino mother who later separated. Ganados was raised by her maternal grandparents. Ganados and her family moved and have resided in the city of Talisay, Cebu, since she was in sixth grade. She studied tourism management and later earned a certificate for providing health care services from the University of San Jose–Recoletos in Cebu City.

== Pageantry ==
=== Miss World Philippines 2014 ===
Ganados joined Miss World Philippines 2014 and placed in the Top 13. Valerie Weigmann won the said pageant.

=== Binibining Pilipinas 2019 ===
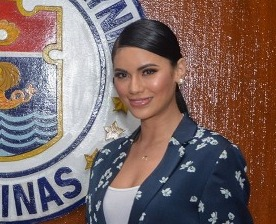
Ganados at a courtesy call at the Manila City Hall as Miss Universe Philippines 2019

In March 2019, the Binibining Pilipinas pageant announced Ganados as one of the 40 contestants for the 2019 edition. She represented her hometown of Talisay, Cebu.

For the national costume competition, she wore an ensemble inspired by Queen Juana, queen consort of Rajah Humabon of the ancient Rajahnate of Cebu, which was designed to represent of the festivities and meaning of the Sinulog Festival in her home province. In honor of her Middle Eastern roots, she chose to perform a belly dance presentation during the talent competition.

Leading up to the main contest, Ganados won two special awards: Best in Long Gown and Face of Binibini. During the coronation night, she advanced to the semifinals and then progressed to the Top 15. During the question and answer portion of the national pageant, she was asked about what she can do to "get more women in the workplace". In her response, she emphasized her elderly care advocacy and pointed at one's elders as an inspiration to pursue one's ambitions.

At the end of the event, she was named the winner of the title Miss Universe Philippines 2019, the main position contested in the pageant, succeeding Catriona Gray, who won Miss Universe the preceding year. She is the second Cebuana to win the Miss Universe Philippines title, after Pilar Pilapil who won in 1967, and the last to win under the Binibining Pilipinas organization.

Following her reign as a national titleholder, she crowned two successors as a result of the transfer of her title to a new organization: Rabiya Mateo in October 2020 for the Miss Universe Philippines pageant, and Hannah Arnold in July 2021 for the Binibining Pilipinas pageant.

=== Miss Universe 2019 ===
As Miss Universe Philippines 2019, Ganados represented the Philippines at the Miss Universe 2019 pageant.

During the national costume competition, Ganados wore a Philippine eagle-inspired ensemble with two life-sized birds on each shoulder. The creation was hand-stitched with laser-cut patterns. She debuted her 'phoenix' walk wearing a black tropical-print bikini with a bright yellow cape at the preliminary swimsuit competition. She wore a golden gilded gown designed by Cebu-based couturier, Cary Santiago at the preliminary evening gown competition which was patterned after the gown she competed with at her national competition.

At the coronation night, she advanced to the Top 20 as one of the wildcards. At the opening statement segment, she acknowledged an aging world and recalled her experiences and realizations at an organization that supported elderly care, an advocacy she emphasized. She was not called to advance to the next round, although would be named as the winner of the Best in National Costume award. . Zozibini Tunzi of South Africa won the said pageant.

=== 2026: MGI All Stars ===
In March 2026, Miss Grand International announced that Ganados entered the inaugural edition of its spin-off MGI All Stars as one of the five Filipino delegates for that edition. Her stint was supported by Empire Philippines, the holder of the Miss Universe Philippines franchise. In a media interview, she attributed her decision to join the competition as a means of platforming her relatives stranded in the Gaza Strip, whose repatriation remained in process at the time of her stint due to administrative difficulties with the Philippine government.

For the contest, Ganados collaborated with a number of designers, including Mark Bumgarner and Rian Fernandez, who designed her gown for the preliminary and final rounds respectively. The latter design by Fernandez was designed to reflect Ganados's Filipino-Palestinian heritage with design cues inspired by the Palestinian keffiyeh and the Filipino pinukpok.

In the preliminary competition, Ganados emerged as the top performer among Philippine delegates and ranked twelfth among all delegates, allowing her to advance to the Top 18 semifinals. During the finals, she progressed through the swimsuit and evening gown rounds after ranking fifth and second in the segments respectively. During the Top 5 question-and-answer portion, judge Abena Appiah asked her for a practical societal solution for cyberbullying. In her answer, she recalled her experience as a victim of cyberbullying and channeled these experiences in "conquering her fears" before shifting focus on the situation of her family in Gaza.

She was not called to advance to the next round and finished as a Top 5 finalist, with Vanessa Pulgarin of Colombia winning the title.

Awards and achievements
Preceded by (Laos) On-anong Homsombath	Miss Universe; Best National Costume; 2019	Succeeded by (Myanmar) Thuzar Wint Lwin
Preceded by Catriona Gray (Oas, Albay)	Miss Universe Philippines; 2019	Succeeded by Rabiya Mateo (Iloilo City)
