= Binibining Pilipinas 2017 =

54th Binibining Pilipinas pageant

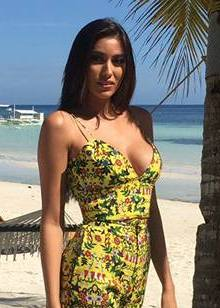
- Date: April 30, 2017
- Presenters: Xian Lim; Pia Wurtzbach; Venus Raj
- Entertainment: Jay R; Daryl Ong; Jason Dy; Daniel Padilla
- Venue: Smart Araneta Coliseum, Quezon City, Metro Manila, Philippines
- Broadcaster: ABS-CBN
- Entrants: 40
- Placements: 25
- Winner: Rachel Peters; Camarines Sur
- Congeniality: Chanel Olive Thomas, Nueva Ecija
- Best National Costume: Chanel Olive Thomas, Nueva Ecija
- Photogenic: Rachel Peters, Camarines Sur

Binibining Pilipinas 2017 was the 54th edition of the Binibining Pilipinas pageant, held at the Smart Araneta Coliseum in Quezon City, Metro Manila, Philippines, on April 30, 2017.

At the end of the event, Rachel Peters was crowned as Miss Universe Philippines 2017 by Maxine Medina, Mariel de Leon was crowned Binibining Pilipinas International 2017 by Kylie Verzosa, Katarina Rodriguez was crowned Binibining Pilipinas Intercontinental 2017 by Jennifer Ruth Hammond, Chanel Olive Thomas was crowned Binibining Pilipinas Supranational 2017 by Joanna Louise Eden, Elizabeth Clenci was crowned Binibining Pilipinas Grand International 2017 by Nicole Cordoves, and Nelda Ibe was crowned Binibining Pilipinas Globe 2017 by Nichole Marie Manalo. Charmaine Elima was named first runner-up and Kristel Guelos was named second runner-up.

== Competition ==
=== Format ===
There were several changes in this edition's format; there were twenty-five semi-finalists chosen for the first cut instead of fifteen. The closed-door interviews and other preliminary activities determined the twenty-five semi-finalists. These semi-finalists then competed in the swimsuit and evening gown competitions. Afterwards, they were narrowed down to fifteen, which included the winner of the People's Choice Award via text votes. The fifteen semi-finalists then competed at the question and answer contest, where the six winners and the two runners-up were determined.

=== Judges ===
- Paulo Avelino – Actor, model
- Mitzi Borromeo – News anchor and correspondent, CNN Philippines
- H.E. Rodrigo Amaral Souza – Ambassador of Brazil to the Philippines
- Phil Reed – Chief Operations Officer, BPI Holdings Inc.
- Ted Failon – Radio and TV News anchor, ABS-CBN
- Nandy Villar – ABS-CBN Marketing Head
- Gretchen Ho – TV host, former professional volleyball player
- H.E. Franz Jessen – Ambassador of the European Union to the Philippines
- Eric Alberto – EVP and Chief Revenue Officer, PLDT-Smart, President and Chief Executive Officer of ePLDT

== Results ==
=== Placements ===
Color keys

- The contestant was a runner-up in an international pageant.
- The contestant was a semi-finalist in an international pageant.
- The contestant did not place.

Placement	Contestant	International placement
Miss Universe Philippines 2017	Bb. #19 – Rachel Peters	Top 10 – Miss Universe 2017
Binibining Pilipinas International 2017	Bb. #15 – Maria Angelica de Leon	Unplaced – Miss International 2017
Binibining Pilipinas Supranational 2017	Bb. #22 – Chanel Olive Thomas	Top 10 – Miss Supranational 2017
Binibining Pilipinas Grand International 2017	Bb. #39 – Elizabeth Clenci	2nd Runner-Up – Miss Grand International 2017
Binibining Pilipinas Intercontinental 2017	Bb. #31 – Katarina Rodriguez	1st Runner-Up – Miss Intercontinental 2017
Binibining Pilipinas Globe 2017	Bb. #18 – Nelda Dorothea Ibe	1st Runner-Up – The Miss Globe 2017
1st Runner-Up	Bb. #32 – Charmaine Elima	
2nd Runner-Up	Bb. #40 – Kristel Guelos	
Top 15	Bb. #10 – Jehza Mae Huelar; Bb. #13 – Sirene Sutton; Bb. #16 – Lara Grace Lacap; Bb. #17 – Maria Camille Manalo; Bb. #20 – Christagale Borja; Bb. #28 – Juliana Kapeundl §; Bb. #34 – Gabriela Patricia Ortega	
Top 25	Bb. #1 – Dane Felisse Marasigan; Bb. #2 – Arienne Louise Calingo; Bb. #6 – Maria Bejieleen Nama; Bb. #7 – Jennyline Carla Malpaya; Bb. #9 – Vanessa Saliba; Bb. #26 – Ruffa Nava; Bb. #27 – Beatrice Valente; Bb. #33 – Kristie Rose Cequeña; Bb. #37 – Sammie Anne Legaspi; Bb. #38 – Ana Patricia Asturias	

§ – Fan vote winner

=== Special awards ===
Award	Contestant	Ref.
Miss Friendship	Bb. #22 – Chanel Olive Thomas	
Face of Binibini (Miss Photogenic)	Bb. #19 – Rachel Peters	
Miss Talent	Bb. #1 – Dane Felisse Marasigan	
Manila Bulletin Reader's Choice	Bb. #20 – Christagale Borja	
Jag Denim Queen	Bb. #19 – Rachel Peters	
Best in Swimsuit	Bb. #19 – Rachel Peters	
Best in Long Gown	Bb. #15 – Maria Angelica de Leon	
Miss Philippine Airlines	Bb. #31 – Katarina Rodriguez	
Miss Cream Silk	Bb. #15 – Maria Angelica de Leon	

==== National Costume Category ====
- The contestant won the Best in National Costume award.

Award	Contestant	Designer
Best in National Costume	Bb. #22 – Chanel Olive Thomas	Edwin Uy
Top 10	Bb. #7 – Jennyline Carla Malpaya	Jonti Martinez
Top 10	Bb. #10 – Jehza Mae Huelar	Erich Miñoza
Top 10	Bb. #13 – Sirene Sutton	Roland Alzate
Top 10	Bb. #15 – Maria Angelica de Leon	Cary Santiago
Top 10	Bb. #18 – Nelda Ibe	Frederick Berches
Top 10	Bb. #20 – Christagale Borja	Nick Guarino
Top 10	Bb. #26 – Ruffa Nava	John Cliff
Top 10	Bb. #29 – Karla May Manongsong	Jun Ilusorio
Top 10	Bb. #31 – Katarina Rodriguez	Francis Libiran

== Contestants ==
Forty contestants competed for six titles.

No.	Contestant	Age (Note: Ages at the time of the pageant)	Hometown
1	Dane Felisse Marasigan	26	Batangas
2	Arienne Louise Calingo	24	Pampanga
3	Maria Gail Devora Tobes	22	Northern Samar
4	Jessica Ramirez	25	Oriental Mindoro
5	Joselle Mariano	21	Trece Martires
6	Maria Benjieleen Nama	24	Laguna
7	Jennyline Carla Malpaya	25	Marilao
8	Leitz Camyll Ang	24	Malabon
9	Vanessa Saliba	21	Rizal
10	Jehza Mae Huelar	22	Davao City
11	Kimberly Pajares	26	Bataan
12	Angelique Celine de Leon	26	Mandaluyong
13	Sirene Sutton	23	Las Piñas
14	Sarah Jireh Asido	26	Bulacan
15	Maria Angelica De Leon	23	Las Piñas
16	Larah Grace Lacap	26	Quezon City
17	Maria Camille Manalo	26	Cavite
18	Nelda Dorothea Ibe	23	Tarlac
19	Rachel Peters	25	Camarines Sur
20	Christagale Borja	26	Samar
21	Jamaica Elysse Ambal	24	Calamba
22	Chanel Olive Thomas	26	Nueva Ecija
23	Arah Salientes	21	San Fernando
24	Dindi Joy Pajares	23	Orani
25	Clarice Marion Villareal	23	Antipolo
26	Ruffa Nava	23	Iloilo City
27	Beatrice Valente	24	Bayawan
28	Juliana Kapeundl	25	Balayan
29	Karla May Manongsong	24	San Jose del Monte
30	Mae Liezel Ramos	26	Naga
31	Katarina Rodriguez	24	Davao City
32	Charmaine Elima	24	Binangonan
33	Kristie Rose Cequeña	24	Santa Rosa
34	Gabriela Patricia Ortega	26	La Union
35	Thoreen Halvorsen	24	Palawan
36	Gillian Eliza Colcol	25	Antipolo
37	Sammie Anne Legaspi	24	Ilocos Sur
38	Ana Patricia Asturias	24	Tacloban
39	Elizabeth Clenci	26	Mandaue
40	Kristel Guelos	24	Tanauan

== Notes ==
=== Post-pageant notes ===
- Rachel Peters competed at Miss Universe 2017 in Las Vegas, Nevada and finished in the top 10. Mariel de Leon competed at Miss International 2017 in Tokyo, Japan and was unplaced.
- Chanel Olive Thomas competed at Miss Supranational 2017 in Poland and finished in the top 10. Thomas also won the Miss Friendship award.
- Elizabeth Clenci competed at Miss Grand International 2017 in Phú Quốc, Vietnam and finished as second runner-up. Nelda Ibe competed at Miss Globe 2017 in Tirana, Albania and finished as first runner-up.
- Katarina Rodriguez competed at Miss Intercontinental 2017 in Hurghada, Egypt and finished as the first runner-up. She also won the Miss Media Popularity award and was first runner-up in the best in national costume award. After Miss Intercontinental, Rodriguez won Miss World Philippines 2018. She then competed at Miss World 2018 in Sanya, China and was unplaced.
- Jehza Huelar competed at Binibining Pilipinas 2018 and won Binibining Pilipinas Supranational 2018. Huelar competed at Miss Supranational 2018 in Krynica-Zdrój, Poland and finished in the top 10 .
- After Binibining Pilipinas, Dindi Pajares competed at Miss World Philippines 2021 and was appointed Miss Supranational Philippines 2021 by a vote of her fellow contestants due to the postponement of the finals night. Pajares then competed at Miss Supranational 2021 where she reached the top 12.
