= Dindi Pajares =

Filipina model

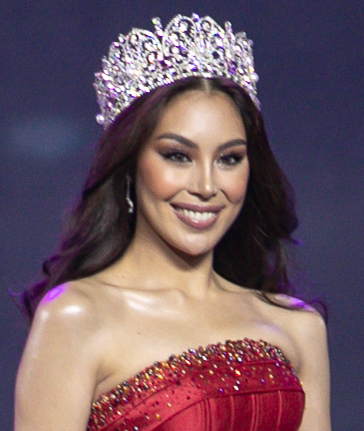
- Pajares in 2022
- Born: Dindi Joy Lacabe Pajares; Orani, Bataan, Philippines
- Height: 1.72 m (5 ft 8 in)
- Beauty pageant titleholder
- Title: Miss Supranational Philippines 2021
- Hair color: Black
- Eye color: Dark Brown
- Major competitions: Miss Philippines Earth 2011; (Top 20); Binibining Pilipinas 2016; (Top 15); Binibining Pilipinas 2017; (Unplaced); Miss World Philippines 2021; (Appointed – Miss Supranational Philippines 2021); Miss Supranational 2021; (Top 12)
- Military career
- Allegiance: Philippines
- Branch: Philippine Air Force
- Rank: Reservist

Dindi Joy Lacabe Pajares is a Filipina military reservist, and beauty pageant titleholder who was appointed as Miss Supranational Philippines 2021. She represented the Philippines at the Miss Supranational 2021 pageant in Nowy Sącz, Poland and finished as a top 12 semifinalist.

== Personal life ==
Pajares is a military reservist with the Philippine Air Force Reserve Command, an international flight attendant, and owns a small merchandising business in her hometown, Bataan.

== Pageantry ==
=== Miss Philippines Earth 2011 ===
Pajares was only 18 years old when she represented Balanga, Bataan at Miss Philippines Earth 2011 held in Puerto Princesa, Palawan, finishing in the top 20.

=== Binibining Pilipinas 2016 ===
She joined Binibining Pilipinas 2016 and represented Balanga, Bataan. She was a finalist for the Best in National Costume. She finished top 15 to Maxine Medina of Quezon City.

=== Binibining Pilipinas 2017 ===
On her second consecutive year, she joined the Binibining Pilipinas 2017 but was unplaced.

=== Miss World Philippines 2021 ===
Pajares returned to the pageantry world and joined the Miss World Philippines 2021 pageant. Due to the pageant's postponement, the Miss World Philippines organization decided to appoint the Miss Supranational Philippines title. The winner was determined by the votes of all the official candidates. Pajares gained the highest votes making her the Miss Supranational Philippines 2021.

=== Miss Supranational 2021 ===
Pajares represented the Philippines at the Miss Supranational 2021 pageant in Poland and finished as a Top 12 semifinalist.

Preceded by Resham Saeed (Maguindanao)	Miss Supranational Philippines; 2021	Succeeded by Alison Black (Las Piñas)
Preceded by (Vietnam) Nguyễn Thị Ngọc Châu	1st-Runner up Miss Elegance Supranational; 2021	Succeeded by (Argentina) Maira Acosta
