= Rachel Peters =

Filipino-British model, host, and Miss Universe Philippines (born 1991)

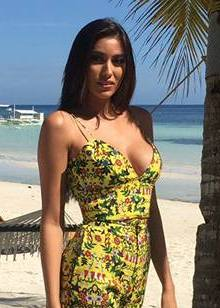
- Peters in 2017
- Born: Rachel Louise Obregon Peters; October 20, 1991 (age 35); Manama, Bahrain
- Education: British International School, Phuket (International Baccalaureate); La Trobe University (Business, Tourism, and Events)
- Height: 5 ft 9 in (1.75 m)
- Spouse: Miguel Luis Villafuerte (m. 2021)
- Children: 3
- Beauty pageant titleholder
- Title: Miss Universe Philippines 2017
- Hair color: Brown
- Eye color: Light Brown
- Major competitions: Miss World Philippines 2014; (4th Princess); (Yahoo Readers' Choice); (Miss Alluring); Binibining Pilipinas 2017; (Winner – Miss Universe Philippines 2017); (Best in Swimsuit); (Miss Photogenic); (Jag Denim Queen); Miss Universe 2017; (Top 10)

First Lady of Camarines Sur
- In role July 2021 – June 30, 2022

Rachel Louise Obregon Peters-Villafuerte (Tagalog: [ˈɹeɪʃɛl ˈpɪtɚs bɪljaˈpwɛɾtɛ]; born October 20, 1991) is a Filipina model, host, and beauty pageant titleholder who was crowned Miss Universe Philippines 2017. She represented the Philippines at the Miss Universe 2017 pageant and finished as a Top 10 semifinalist.

== Early life and education ==
Rachel Louise Obregon Peters was born on October 20, 1991, in Manama, Bahrain, to a British father, Nigel Peters and a Filipina mother, Annie Obregon. She has a younger brother named Daniel. Their family manages a concert promotion company that caters to shows across Southeast Asia. Peters graduated from the British International School, Phuket with an International Baccalaureate degree, and earned her bachelor's degree in Business, Tourism, and Events from La Trobe University.

== Pageantry ==
=== Miss World Philippines 2014 ===
Peters started her pageantry stint when she competed at Miss World Philippines 2014 at the Mall of Asia Arena in Manila on October 11, 2014. She placed as the 4th Princess and lost to eventual winner Valerie Weigmann. She also bagged the Yahoo Readers' Choice and Miss Alluring awards.

=== Binibining Pilipinas 2017 ===
On April 30, 2017, Peters joined Binibining Pilipinas 2017 held at the Smart Araneta Coliseum in Quezon City.

During the question and portion round of the pageant, she was asked: "If you get to speak in front of the ASEAN leaders, what would be your message to the leaders?" She responded:

"I believe that one of the biggest problems that our country faces today is divisiveness in politics, in religion and also in culture. And I believe that it is something that is the same across the world. And that is something I would want to address. I believe that when people can learn to tolerate each other's differences and respect each other's opinions, then we will just be a stronger nation and world."

By the end of the event, she was crowned Miss Universe Philippines 2017 by Maxine Medina along with the Best in Swimsuit, Miss Photogenic and JAG Denim Queen awards.

On March 18, 2018, Peters crowned Catriona Gray as her successor at the Binibining Pilipinas 2018 pageant held at the Smart Araneta Coliseum in Quezon City, Philippines.

=== Miss Universe 2017 ===
Peters represented the Philippines at the Miss Universe 2017 pageant.

At the national costume competition, Peters wore a Sarimanok-inspired golden one-piece swimsuit—complete with wings and a headpiece which is a symbol of good fortune for the Maranao people. Val Taguba created the costume and Jojo Bragais designed her gladiator-style boots.

At the preliminary competition, Peters shows off her 'infinity walk'. She donned her black Yamamay two-piece swimsuit at the preliminary swimsuit competition and wore a golden evening gown designed by Dubai-based Filipino designer, Val Taguba at the preliminary evening gown competition.

At the coronation night, she wore a blue two-piece Yamamay bikini at the Top 16 swimsuit competition and was dressed in a silver long gown with intricate details and sparkly beadwork designed by Val Taguba at the Top 10 evening gown competition.

She entered the Top 16 as the fan vote in the wildcards. Peters concluded her Miss Universe journey by finishing as a Top 10 semifinalist, continuing the streak of the Philippines at 8th-straight finalist placement. Demi-Leigh Nel-Peters of South Africa won the said pageant.

== Personal life ==
The British-born Peters became a Filipino citizen in 2015.

On November 11, 2019, she was engaged to Governor of Camarines Sur, Miguel Luis Villafuerte. Their wedding was supposed to be held in Indonesia, but postponed due to quarantine measures imposed in the country to curb the spread of COVID-19. On May 18, 2021, Peters announced on Instagram that she was 18 weeks pregnant.

In July 2021, she married Villafuerte in a civil ceremony.

On October 11, 2021, she gave birth to her first child, a daughter named Kaia Rose. In July 2023, she gave birth to her second child, a son named Andres.

Awards and achievements
Preceded by Maxine Medina (Quezon City)	Miss Universe Philippines; 2017	Succeeded by Catriona Gray (Albay)
