= Chanique Rabe =

Namibian model, Miss Supranational 2021

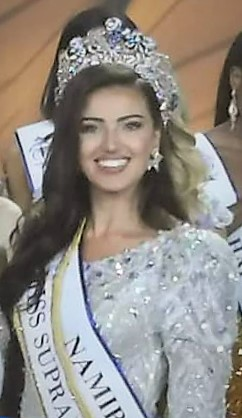
- Chanique Rabe as Miss Supranational 2021
- Born: Chanique Chani Rabe; 17 March 1997 (age 29); Windhoek, Namibia
- Education: Windhoek Afrikaanse Privaatskool
- Occupations: Model; fashion designer; beauty pageant titleholder; Ambassador
- Height: 1.75 m (5 ft 9 in)
- Spouse: Kyle Honeyborne (m. 2023)
- Beauty pageant titleholder
- Title: Miss Teen Namibia 2014; Miss Teen Continents 2015; Miss Supranational Namibia 2020; Miss Supranational 2021
- Hair color: Brown
- Eye color: Blue
- Major competitions: Miss Teen Namibia 2014 (Winner); Miss Teen Continents 2015 (Winner); Miss Supranational Namibia 2020 (Winner); Miss Supranational 2021 (Winner)

Chanique Rabe Honeyborne (born 17 March 1997) is a Namibian model, fashion designer, and beauty pageant titleholder who was crowned Miss Supranational 2021. Rabe was previously crowned Miss Teen Continents 2015 and Miss Supranational Namibia 2020, making her the first representative from Namibia to win the Miss Supranational title, the first African country to do so. Rabe’s interests lie in the creative aspects of the fashion industry.

== Early life and education ==
Rabe was born and raised in Windhoek, Namibia. She is an ambassador for Hope Village Orphanage. Through her own charity project called The Mending Project, she teaches sewing to children. She holds a certificate in makeup artistry and photography.

Rabe attended Windhoek Afrikaanse Privaatskool from 2003 to 2015. Her foray into the world of pageantry started when she held the Miss Windhoek Afrikaanse Privaatskool title at the age of fifteen. After winning Miss Teen Namibia 2014, Rabe represented Namibia at the same international teenager pageant scale, Miss Teen Continents 2015 in Houston, Texas, United States and won the title for the very first time for Namibia. She also won the Face of Queen Spark 2015 in Johannesburg, South Africa.

== Pageantry ==
=== Miss Teen Namibia 2014 ===
Rabe started her pageantry stint when she competed and won the title of Miss Teen Namibia 2014.

=== Miss Teen Continents 2015 ===
Rabe represented Namibia and was crowned Miss Teen Continents 2015.

=== Miss Supranational Namibia 2020 ===
Rabe was crowned Miss Supranational Namibia 2020 on November 14, 2020 at Droombos in Windhoek, Namibia besting 12 other candidates. At the end of the event, she succeeded outgoing Miss Supranational Namibia 2019 and Miss Supranational 2019 1st Runner-Up, Yana Haenisch.

=== Miss Supranational 2021 ===
Rabe represented Namibia at the Miss Supranational 2021 pageant on August 21, 2021 at the Strzelecki Park Amphitheater in Nowy Sącz, Małopolska, Poland. She was crowned the winner by outgoing titleholder Anntonia Porsild of Thailand. She is the first Miss Supranational titleholder from Namibia. Chanique has started 'The Mending Project' to help young girls in the development of life skills. The project teaches Namibian youth to sew, which is an essential life skill to be learn. Namibia's last victory in a major pageant was Miss Universe 1992, when Michelle McLean won the crown.

During her reign as Miss Supranational 2021, she travelled to Poland, France, South Africa, United Arab Emirates, Curacao, Czech Republic, Thailand, Ecuador, Spain, and her home country of Namibia.

== Personal life ==
On 23 September 2023, Chanique married her long time boyfriend Kyle Honeyborne. The two had met at Swakopmund seven years earlier.

Awards and achievements
Preceded by (Thailand) Anntonia Porsild	Miss Supranational; 2021	Succeeded by (South Africa) Lalela Mswane
Preceded by Yana Haenisch	Miss Supranational Namibia; 2021	Succeeded by Julita Kitwe
