= Oliver Tolentino =

Filipino-American fashion designer

- Born: Orani, Bataan, Philippines
- Citizenship: American (Filipino-American)
- Education: Miriam College, Slim’s Fashion and Arts School, Fashion Institute of the Philippines.
- Occupation: Fashion designer
- Website: olivertolentino.com

Oliver Tolentino is a Filipino-American fashion designer and businessman. He is the founder and creative director of Oliver Tolentino Couture, based in Beverly Hills, California.

== Early life and education ==
Tolentino was born and raised in the small town of Orani in the province of Bataan, Philippines. He was educated at Miriam College, Slim's Fashion and Arts School, and the Fashion Institute of the Philippines before launching his career in Manila as a fashion designer.

== Career ==
Before expanding internationally, Tolentino started his fashion career in Pasiq, a city within Metro Manila, by opening a shop, Oliver, in the 1990s, before transferring in 2005 to Makati City, Manila's financial center, and using his full name. In 2009, he opened a boutique, Oliver Tolentino, on Melrose Avenue in West Hollywood, California, making him one of the few Filipino designers ever to have a presence in the U.S. market. The following year, Tolentino was named a finalist of the 2010 OSCARS Designer Challenge. His designs have been featured on red carpets at the Oscars, Golden Globes, Emmys, Grammys, SAG Awards, American Billboard Awards, American Music Awards, BET Awards, Cannes Film Festival, Critics Choice Awards, Monte Carlo TV Festival, and the People's Choice Awards. His designs have been worn by Hollywood celebrities, including Jessica Alba, Emmy Rossum, Carrie Underwood, Fergie, Mel B, Minnie Driver, Carrie Fisher, Marin Hinkle, Anna Paquin, Sophia Bush, Olivia Munn, Giuliana Rancic, Neve Campbell, Kat Dennings, Gabriel Union, Victoria Justice, Julie Delpy, Michelle Trachtenberg,Rachael Leigh Cook and Katie Couric. His work has appeared on television programs such as American Idol, America’s Next Top Model, The View, Dick Clark’s Rockin’ New’s Eve with Ryan Seacrest, and E!’s Fashion Police. For America’s Next Top Model, he created the USA vs. U.K. model “walk-off” runway collection for Cycle 18’s premiere episode, and his dresses were featured in a “Pink’s Hotdog” photo shoot in Cycle 17. He also appeared with then-host Maria Menounos on the entertainment program Extra, along with his creations.

In 2014, Tolentino became the first designer of Filipino descent in 53 years to dress an Oscar winner at the Academy Awards, when the director Jennifer Lee won for the animated hit film Frozen.

== Collections ==
Tolentino has presented collections worldwide, including in Vienna (Austria), Bali (Indonesia), the Bahamas, Bangkok (Thailand), Barbados, Busan (South Korea), and EcoChic/ReDress events in Hong Kong. In 2019, his designs were showcased at the United Nations’ Palais des Nations in Geneva (Switzerland) and for a photo shoot in Israel. In 2022, he was the invited annual guest designer at Vienna Fashion Week. In 2018, he was an inaugural designer at the 1st Thai Silk International Fashion Week in Bangkok, in which he participated for three consecutive years. In 2024, he presented a fashion show in Bangkok for government officials and diplomats to celebrate the 75th anniversary of diplomatic relations between Thailand and the Philippines.

In the United States, Tolentino has presented multiple collections in Los Angeles, New York, Palm Springs, San Diego, and San Francisco. In 2011, Fashion Week El Paseo in Palm Springs honored him as its Designer of the Week. In 2016, he was the first designer asked to present a collection at San Diego Women’s Week. In 2021, his fashion show during LA Fashion Week was attended by figures from the entertainment industry. The same year, he was invited to present his work at the inaugural Kornit Fashion Week LA in Los Angeles.

== Ecological materials ==
Tolentino is recognized for often using eco-friendly materials, including pineapple fiber (piña), abaca, jute, raw silk, and water-lily fabric sourced from the Philippines. In 2010, he won the Sustainable Eco Fashion Award in the Bahamas. At Bali Fashion Week, he won the Carnivale prize for an outfit made out of Capiz shells. In 2011, he was named the Featured Designer of the eco-ethical initiative Rags2Riches, and the following year, he was the first-ever Featured Eco Designer at Global Green’s Pre-Oscars Party in Hollywood. He also has shown an all-eco collection at Eco Fashion Week in New York and Beverly Hills. Hong Kong Tatler magazine featured one of his eco gowns. In 2013, the European news outlet Euronews featured Tolentino in a story about Manila.

== In the Philippines ==
In the Philippines, where he's been called the “Valentino of the Philippines,” the national television network ABS-CBN honored Tolentino with its Samsung MetroWear Icon Award in 2011. The media company, including its Metro and Metro Society magazines, produced his 75+ piece fashion show featuring professional and celebrity models before a 600-person crowd of Manila society, including former First Lady Imelda Marcos. A recording of the show was broadcast nationally.

Tolentino has been featured in one-on-one interviews for well-known national Filipino television shows such as The Bottomline with Boy Abunda, Probe with Cheche Lazaro, and Powerhouse with Kara David.

He is known among Filipinos for providing Pia Wurtzbach with a last-minute red gown for the Miss Universe preliminaries during the year she won after Steve Harvey mistakenly announced the wrong winner.

Tolentino’s designs also have adorned Filipino-American entertainment figures. Three-time Oscar-nominated cinematographer Matthew Libatique and Oscar-nominated director Ronnie del Carmen wore his piña eco tuxedos to the OSCARS, as well as Best Song nominee Bobby Lopez to the Golden Globes. Libatique’s appearance is believed to be the first time a nominee wore Philippine fabrics to an OSCARS. In addition, actress Tia Carrere has worn his dresses on the red carpet, and Tony winner Lea Salonga has performed in concerts and walked an NYFW charity runway in his gowns.

== Awards, recognition and charitable activity ==
In 2020, Tolentino was named one of The 100 Outstanding Filipinos in America (TOFA 100) along with Darren Criss, Bruno Mars, and EGOT winner Bobby Lopez.

Tolentino has been involved in charity initiatives, donating proceeds from fashion shows to different causes.
