= Nicole Kim Donesa =

Actress

Nicole Donesa
- Born: Nicole Kim Donesa; May 27, 1994 (age 32); Quezon City, Philippines
- Other name: Nicole Donesa
- Education: Angelicum College
- Spouse: Mark Herras (m. 2021)
- Children: 2
- Beauty pageant titleholder
- Title: Miss World Philippines 2014
- Agency: GMA Artist Center (2017–2021)
- Hair color: Black
- Eye color: Dark Brown
- Major competitions: Miss World Philippines 2014 (3rd Rincess) (Best Hair/Style Award)

Nicole Kim Donesa-Herras (born May 27, 1994) is a Filipino actress, singer and beauty queen. She is best known for being crowned as Miss World Philippines 2014's Third Princess. She plays Martha, a scheming, arrogant, and villainous person, on the television series Bihag (2019).

== Personal life ==
She graduated from Angelicum College, Quezon City with a degree in Bachelor of Arts in Communication. She grew up in the United States with her family and, having returned to the Philippines, decided to join the beauty pageant Binibining Pilipinas in 2013. Donesa married actor Mark Herras in 2020. The couple have two children.

== Filmography ==
Year	Title	Role
2011	Bokor	Amy
2012	Dave's World	Girl in Dream 1
2013	Binibining Pilipinas 2013: The Golden Road to the Crown	Herself
2014	The Boston	Pretty Girl 1
2014	Miss World Philippines 2014	Herself
2014–2019	Magpakailanman	Various roles
2017	Haplos	Frances
2017	Super Ma'am	an Archaeologist
2017–2018	Daig Kayo ng Lola Ko	Fairy/Mitch
2018	Contessa	Monique
2018	Stories for the Soul: Private Zoo	Minerva
2018	Sherlock Jr.	Cassandra "Sandeng" Lopez
2018	Kapag Nahati ang Puso	Cindy
2018	Pamilya Roces	Bebe
2018–2020	Maynila	Various roles
2019	Cain at Abel	a Flirty Girl
2019	Bihag	Martha Dampit
2019	Sarap, 'Di Ba?	Herself/Guest
2019	Pepito Manaloto: Ang Tunay na Kuwento	Lillian
2019	Dear Uge: Ferpect Boyfriend	Stephanie
2020	Descendants of the Sun	Via Catindig
2022	Family Feud	Herself/Guest Player
