= Miss Jamaica Global =

Jamaican organization

- Formation: 2004
- Type: Beauty Pageant
- Headquarters: Kingston
- Location: Jamaica
- Members: Miss International; Miss Supranational; Miss Global; Miss Globe
- Official language: English
- Franchise Holder: Mr Lachu Ramachandani
- Key people: Mr Lachu Ramachandani
- Website: Official Website

Miss Jamaica Global is a Jamaican beauty pageant for young women in the island, that share the same view as its Motto Uniting the World through beauty and tourism.

== History ==
The Miss Global Pageant began in 2004 as Miss Commonwealth, which was created by Franchise Holder Mr. Lachu Ramachandani. However, due to the overwhelming responses from non-commonwealth countries, the director decided to change the title to Miss Global International. Since 2004, he has produced some fabulous queens from all over the World including Canada, Zimbabwe, Bahamas, Jamaica, Trinidad and Tobago, Puerto Rico and the United Kingdom.

== Titleholders ==
The winner of Miss Jamaica Global represents her country in Miss Global International or Miss International

Year	Miss Jamaica Global	Notes
2004	Natalie Green	
2005	Romayne McNab	
2006	Amoy Moulton	
2007	Camille Box	
2008	Jody-Ann Wallace	
2009	Adrianna Bryan	
2010	Shereen Sterling	
2011	Kimberly Sherlock	
2012	Clare Groves	
2013	Rochelle Mckinley	
2014	Shavrine Wilson	
2015	Gillian Parague	
2016	Kedejah Anderson	
2022	Israel Nefferttiti Harrison	Top 8 in Miss International 2022
2023	Sabrina Johnson	

=== Miss Jamaica Supranational ===
- : Declared as Winner
- : Ended as runner-up or top 5/6 qualification
- : Ended as one of the finalists or semifinalists
- : Ended as special awards winner

Year	Miss Jamaica Supranational	Placement at Miss Supranational	Special Awards
2025	Sara Dee Palmer	Unplaced	
2023	Thalia Malcolm	Unplaced	Top 29 Miss Talent
2022	Carisa Peart	Top 24	Miss Supranational Caribbean
2021	Lawnda Shantell Jackson	Unplaced	
2019	Kimberly Dawkins	Unplaced	
2018	Tonille Simone Watkis	Unplaced	
2017	Nicole Stoddart	Top 25	
2016	Olivia Dwyer	Unplaced	
2015	Regina Harding	Unplaced	
Did not compete in 2014
2013	Maurita Robinson	Unplaced	

== See also ==
- Miss Grand Jamaica
