= Bea Magtanong =

Filipino lawyer, model, and beauty pageant titleholder

- Born: Bea Patricia de Guzman Magtanong; April 27, 1994 (age 32); Bataan, Philippines
- Other name: Patch Magtanong
- Education: University of the Philippines Diliman
- Occupations: Lawyer; model
- Height: 1.73 m (5 ft 8 in)
- Spouse: Josh Cordoves (m. 2023)
- Beauty pageant titleholder
- Title: Binibining Pilipinas International 2019
- Hair color: Black
- Eye color: Hazel
- Major competitions: Binibining Pilipinas 2019 (Winner – Binibining Pilipinas International 2019) (Best in Swimsuit) (Bb. Megawide); Miss International 2019 (Top 8)

Bea Patricia "Patch" de Guzman Magtanong-Cordoves (born April 27, 1994) is a Filipino lawyer, beauty pageant titleholder and fashion model who was crowned Binibining Pilipinas International 2019.

Magtanong represented the Philippines at the Miss International 2019 competition on 12 November 2019 in Tokyo, Japan placing in the Top 8.

== Early life and education ==
Magtanong was born on April 27, 1994, to a lawyer father and an accountant mother. She grew up idolizing both her parents and their professions, especially her father and his legal practice. While Magtanong's parents never prodded her to study Law and become a lawyer herself, she was always intrigued by the legal profession.

In July 2014, Magtanong graduated cum laude with a degree in business economics from the University of the Philippines Diliman, where she would also later study and complete her Juris Doctor (law degree). She was among the 1,800 new lawyers who took the oath in June 2019 after passing the Philippine Bar Examination in October 2018.

== Pageantry ==
=== Binibining Pilipinas 2019 ===
Binibining Pilipinas was Magtanong's first-ever beauty pageant competition. During the finals held on 9 June 2019 at the Smart Araneta Coliseum, she was recognized with special awards Bb. Megaworld and Best in Swimsuit. She succeeded Ahtisa Manalo after being crowned 2019 Binibining Pilipinas International, becoming the country's representative to the Miss International 2019 competition slated 12 November at the Tokyo Dome City Hall in Tokyo, Japan.

During the 2019 Binibining Pilipinas question and answer round, Magtanong was asked: "If you could have the opportunity to meet somebody globally influential, who would that be and why?" To which she replied:

I really idolize Angelina Jolie because she is blessed with not just a thriving career in Hollywood, but then as a woman, she is able to use that influence, that voice, and that audience to advocate for the causes that she believes in, like breaking world hunger with the UN. And someday, if given the chance, I would like to be just like her. Thank you.

She stated in a subsequent interview that she was aiming to win the Miss Universe Philippines crown to strengthen emphasis and further her advocacy on social justice, particularly on the rights of prisoners but added, in conclusion, that she is very happy with the 2019 Binibining Pilipinas International title she now holds, and is looking forward to using her platform for the causes she believes in.

=== Miss International 2019 ===
On 12 November 2019, Magtanong represented the Philippines at the Miss International 2019 pageant in Tokyo, Japan. During the speech portion of the pageant, the Top 8 finalists were given the chance to express themselves on why they should be the next Miss International. Magtanong's speech read:

When I was younger, I found it strange that I was subjected to different standards as other boys my age. When I got older and even more so when I became a lawyer, I began to question these standards and challenge them. Why should women live in fear of harassment, violence, and discrimination when basic human decency calls for respect, tolerance, and compassion? To cheer all women means to support all women regardless of their race, religion, or background. But not only this – it also means to remove the barriers that prevent women from realizing their full potential. Miss International does this by fostering a global culture of women empowerment and gender equality. And through this platform, we can ensure that no woman anytime, anywhere is left behind.

At the end of the pageant, she finished as one of the Top 8 finalists.

== Personal life ==
In September 2022, she announced her engagement to fellow model, Joshua Cordoves, brother of Miss Grand International 2016 1st runner-up Nicole Cordoves.

Magtanong and Cordoves married in July 2023. In November 2025, she announced that they were expecting their first child.

Awards and achievements
Preceded by Ahtisa Manalo	Binibining Pilipinas; International; 2019	Succeeded by Hannah Arnold
