= Ang Huling Henya =

- Theatrical release poster
- Directed by: Marlon Rivera
- Written by: Marlon Rivera
- Produced by: Vincent Del Rosario III; Veronique Del Rosario-Corpus; Desiree Pe-Beasley; Amrit Punjabi
- Starring: Rufa Mae Quinto; Edgar Allan Guzman; Candy Pangilinan
- Cinematography: Lee Meily
- Edited by: Chuck Gutierrez
- Music by: Jasper Perez
- Production companies: Viva Films; Multivision Pictures
- Distributed by: Viva Films
- Release date: August 21, 2013
- Running time: 125 minutes
- Country: Philippines
- Languages: Filipino, English

Ang Huling Henya (lit. The Last Genius) is a 2013 Filipino action zombie comedy film directed by Marlon Rivera starring Rufa Mae Quinto. The film, produced by Viva Films and Multivision Pictures and distributed by Viva Films officially premiered in the Philippines on August 21, 2013.

== Plot ==
Miri Alvarez is a highly skilled but impulsive agent working for an international organization dedicated to protecting scientists and inventors from a nefarious tech-stealing group known as “The Agency.” Haunted by the belief that she is responsible for her parents' deaths during her childhood, Miri's personal guilt influences her reckless behavior in the field.

During a critical rescue operation, Miri's refusal to adhere to protocol results in the death of her long-time partner. This incident leads to her suspension and return to Manila, where she struggles to reconnect with her estranged younger brother, Mark, who harbors resentment towards her for abandoning the family.

While attempting to adjust to civilian life, Miri becomes entangled in a series of mysterious disappearances involving high-IQ individuals. Her investigation reveals that these individuals are being transformed into zombies by The Agency, which plans to use them to further their technological ambitions. As Miri delves deeper, she uncovers connections between The Agency's activities and her own family's past, including secrets about her parents' involvement in scientific endeavors.

Determined to stop The Agency and their zombie army, Miri teams up with her brother Mark and her confidante Peachy Powers. Together, they confront various challenges, including battling reanimated corpses and confronting personal demons. Miri's journey forces her to reconcile with her past, mend her relationship with Mark, and embrace her role as a protector.

In a final confrontation, Miri and her allies infiltrate The Agency's headquarters, facing off against the organization's leader and their zombie creations. Utilizing her combat skills and newfound emotional resilience, Miri manages to thwart The Agency's plans, destroy the zombie-producing technology, and bring closure to her family's tragic history.

== Cast ==
- Rufa Mae Quinto as Miri Alvarez
- Edgar Allan Guzman as Mark Alvarez
- Candy Pangilinan as Peachy Powers
- Ayen Munji-Laurel as Miriam Alvarez
- DJ Durano as Andrew Alvarez
- Ricci Chan as Joan / Jonas
- Robert Seña as Uncle Greg
- Valerie Weigmann as Victoria
- Fabio Ide as Yllana
- Kalila Aguilos as Gigi
- Kean Cipriano as Dexter
- Jovic Monsod as Jojo
- Tess Antonio as Elevator Operator
- Frances Ignacio as Tita Elaine
- Julienn Mendoza as Prof Tirona
- Stella Cañete as Mrs. Tirona
- M. Barretto as Assassin
- Harvey Cruz as Assassin
- Tinz Diaz as Assassin
- Marcelo Baldomar as Assassin
- Marvin Agustin as Lee (uncredited)
- Abby Bautista as Young Miri (uncredited)
- Cherie Gil as Chief Gabriel
- Marco Masa as Young Mark (uncredited)
- Joaqui Valdes as Flirting Guy at the Grocery (uncredited)
- Gwen Zamora as French girl

== Release ==
The film was released on August 21, 2013, by Viva Films. It was released in the Philippines alongside The Conjuring and Planes.

== Reception ==
Carljoe Javier of Rappler described the film as an uneven one but praised the performance of Rufa Mae Quinto. However, Philippine Star gave a positive review of both the film and the performance of Quinto.
