= Reformed Church Windhoek =

Coordinates: 22.5548°S 17.0882°E

- Gereformeerde Kerk Windhoek
- Reformed Church Windhoek
- Location: Windhoek
- Country: Namibia
- Denomination: Reformed Churches in South Africa

History
- Founded: 1937 (split from GK Church Gobabis
- Founder(s): Demps van der Merwe, first pastor (1950–1957)

The Reformed Church Windhoek (Dutch: Gereformeerde kerk Windhoek or GK Windhoek) is the oldest of the three Dutch Reformed churches in Windhoek, the capital of Namibia.

The GK Windhoek was founded in 1937, the sixth-oldest congregation in then South West Africa of the Reformed Churches in South Africa. In the Windhoek district, near the village of Dordabis, the Reformed Church Bitterwater was started earlier in 1935, but closed in 1964 after five years with only 14 confirmed and 13 baptized members. The GK Windhoek is thus the fifth-oldest GK congregation still active in Namibia. The Dutch Reformed Church Windhoek is for its part the fifth-oldest in the entire Dutch Reformed Church in South Africa (NHK). The local Dutch Reformed Church in South Africa (NGK) was only established on November 23, 1950, 21 years after the NHK one and 13 years after the GK one.

Initially holding services in various local homes and halls, the GK Windhoek finally built its own church building in 1952. An angular, flat-roofed building with some upper wall tiles painted in contrasting colors to the rest of the exterior, it was nicknamed the "raisin bread church."

On September 10, 1977, the GK Windhoek moved into its spacious, new building. The brown brick church overlooks the capital is located on the corner of Luther and Liliencron Streets in the suburb of Eros. The architect was Tinus du Plessis, and Michiel Prinsloo, then the oldest surviving member of the Dorsland Trek by which Boers first settled the area, unlocked the front door at the opening ceremony. A "treasure chest" of marble was placed in the foyer for tithes. Cost overruns led the church to buy a smaller organ than the one commissioned for the building. Construction finished on November 2, 2002 when the corbel was installed.

== Ministers ==
- Dr. Demps van der Merwe, 1950–1957
- Dr. Jan Jacobus van der Walt, 1957–1958
- Jacobus Andries Jooste, 1959–1962
- Hermanus Albertus Louw, 1962–1968
- Andries Gerhardus Christiaan Yssel, 1968–1988 (accepted emeritus status)
- Philippus Petrus de Villiers, 1984–1989
- Philippus Jacobus Wilhelmus Schutte van der Westhuizen, 1988 – January 9, 2000 (died in office)
- Hendrik Reinecke, 1991–1999
- Dr. Johannes Petrus Bingle, 2000–2010
- Dr. Pieter (Piet) Fanoy, 2010–2016
- Henning Vorster Venter, July 24, 2016–present

== Bibliography ==
- (af) Harris, C.T., Noëth, J.G. (Hannes Noeth, Sarkady, N.G., Schutte, F.M. en Van Tonder, J.M. 2010. Van seringboom tot kerkgebou: die argitektoniese erfenis van die Gereformeerde Kerke. ("From lilac to church: the architectural heritage of the Reformed Church) Potchefstroom: Administratiewe Buro. ("Administrative Office")
- (en) Potgieter, D.J. (hoofred.) Standard Encyclopaedia of Southern Africa. Cape Town: Nasionale Opvoedkundige Uitgewery Ltd., 1973.
- (en) Raper, P.E. 1987. Dictionary of South African Place Names. Johannesburg: Lowry Publishers.
- (af) Schalekamp, Mr. M.E. (voorsitter: redaksiekommissie) (chairman: editorial board). 2001. Die Almanak van die Gereformeerde Kerke in Suid-Afrika vir die jaar 2002. Potchefstroom: Administratiewe Buro.
- (af) Van der Walt, Dr. S.J. (voorsitter: deputate almanak) (chairman. 1997. Die Almanak van die Gereformeerde Kerke in Suid-Afrika vir die jaar 1998. (Almanac of the Reformed Churches of South Africa. * 1998)Potchefstroom: Administratiewe Buro.
- (af) Venter, Mr. A.A. (hoofred.) (Ammi Venter) 1957. Almanak van die Gereformeerde Kerk in Suid-Afrika vir die jaar 1958. Potchefstroom: Administratiewe Buro.
- (af) Venter, Mr. A.A. (hoofred.) 1958. Almanak van die Gereformeerde Kerk in Suid-Afrika vir die jaar 1959. Potchefstroom: Administratiewe Buro.
- (af) Vogel, Willem (red.). 2014. Die Almanak van die Gereformeerde Kerke in Suid-Afrika vir die jaar 2015. Potchefstroom: Administratiewe Buro.
