= Hannah Arnold (beauty queen) =

Filipina beauty pageant titleholder

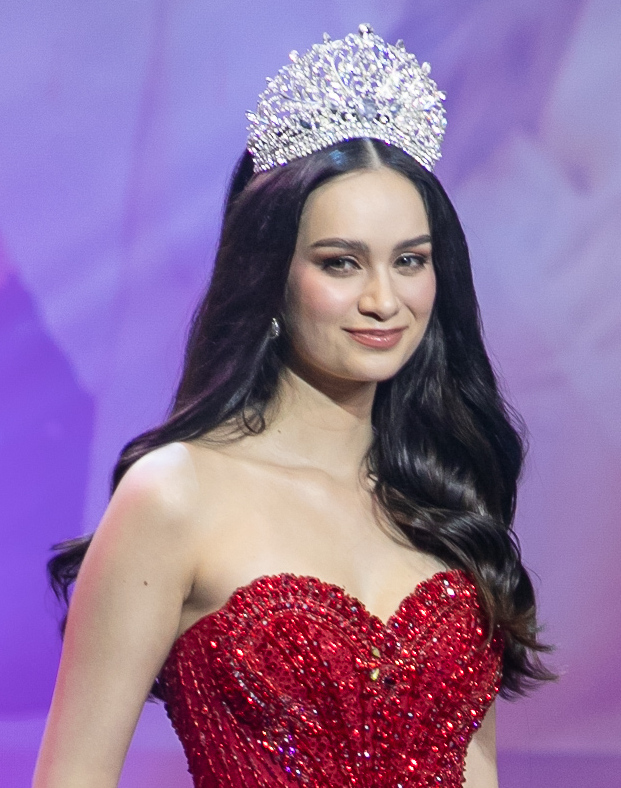
- Arnold in 2022
- Born: Hannah Consencino Arnold; January 21, 1996 (age 30); Balud, Masbate, Philippines
- Education: University of Canberra
- Beauty pageant titleholder
- Title: Binibining Pilipinas International 2021
- Major competitions: Binibining Pilipinas 2019; (Top 15); Binibining Pilipinas 2021; (Winner – Binibining Pilipinas International 2021); (Miss Careline); (Jag Denim Queen); Miss International 2022; (Top 15)

Hannah Consencino Arnold (born January 21, 1996) is a Filipina beauty pageant titleholder who was crowned Binibining Pilipinas International 2021. She represented the Philippines at the Miss International 2022 pageant and finished in the top 15.

== Early life and education ==
Hannah Consencino Arnold was born in Balud, Masbate, Philippines. Her father is of Irish-Australian descent and her Filipino mother is from Masbate, Bicol Region. Arnold was raised in Canberra, Australia before returning to the Philippines after graduating from the University of Canberra with a degree in Applied Science in Forensic Studies.

== Pageantry ==
=== Baby Queen of Masbate 2002 ===
Arnold's first pageant was in 2002, when she won Baby Queen of Masbate at the age of six.

=== Miss Philippines Australia 2014 ===
In 2014, Arnold was crowned Miss Philippines Australia - Charity Queen at 18 years old. For the past 4 to 5 years, Arnold has been donating funds and goods annually on her birthday to the White Cross Orphanage.

=== Binibining Pilipinas 2019 ===
In 2019, Arnold entered Binibining Pilipinas 2019, and finished as a top 15 finalist. During the question and answer round, she was asked: "What is your message for the young and new breed of politicians that won in the recent elections, for example, Pasig Mayor Vico Sotto?" She responded:

Well, I would like to say that I'm so proud to be a millennial right now. The youth are building our nation. We're on the road to a better nation, a better world, and it's thanks to these politicians. So, thank you.

=== Binibining Pilipinas 2021 ===
In 2021, Arnold entered and won the Binibining Pilipinas 2021 competition. During the question and answer round, Arnold was asked: "Given the reach and power of social media, do you believe that genuine freedom of speech exists in the Philippines nowadays? Why or why not?" She responded:

First of all, freedom of speech is a basic human right that we all must remember. It is important for our democracy. With our upcoming election, we definitely need freedom of speech. For example, on Twitter, we are limited to a few characters, and what I have seen in these Tweets is powerful. That has helped me think about who I'd like to vote for in the upcoming elections. Thank you.

At the end of the event, she was crowned Binibining Pilipinas International 2021, succeeding Patch Magtanong. She also won the Jag Denim Queen and Miss Careline awards.

=== Miss International 2022 ===
As the winner of Binibining Pilipinas International 2021, Arnold represented the Philippines at Miss International 2022 and finished in the Top 15.

Awards and achievements
Preceded by Patch Magtanong (Bataan)	Binibining Pilipinas International; 2021	Succeeded by Nicole Borromeo (Cebu)
