= Pia Wurtzbach =

Filipina actress, beauty queen, and Miss Universe 2015 winner (born 1989)

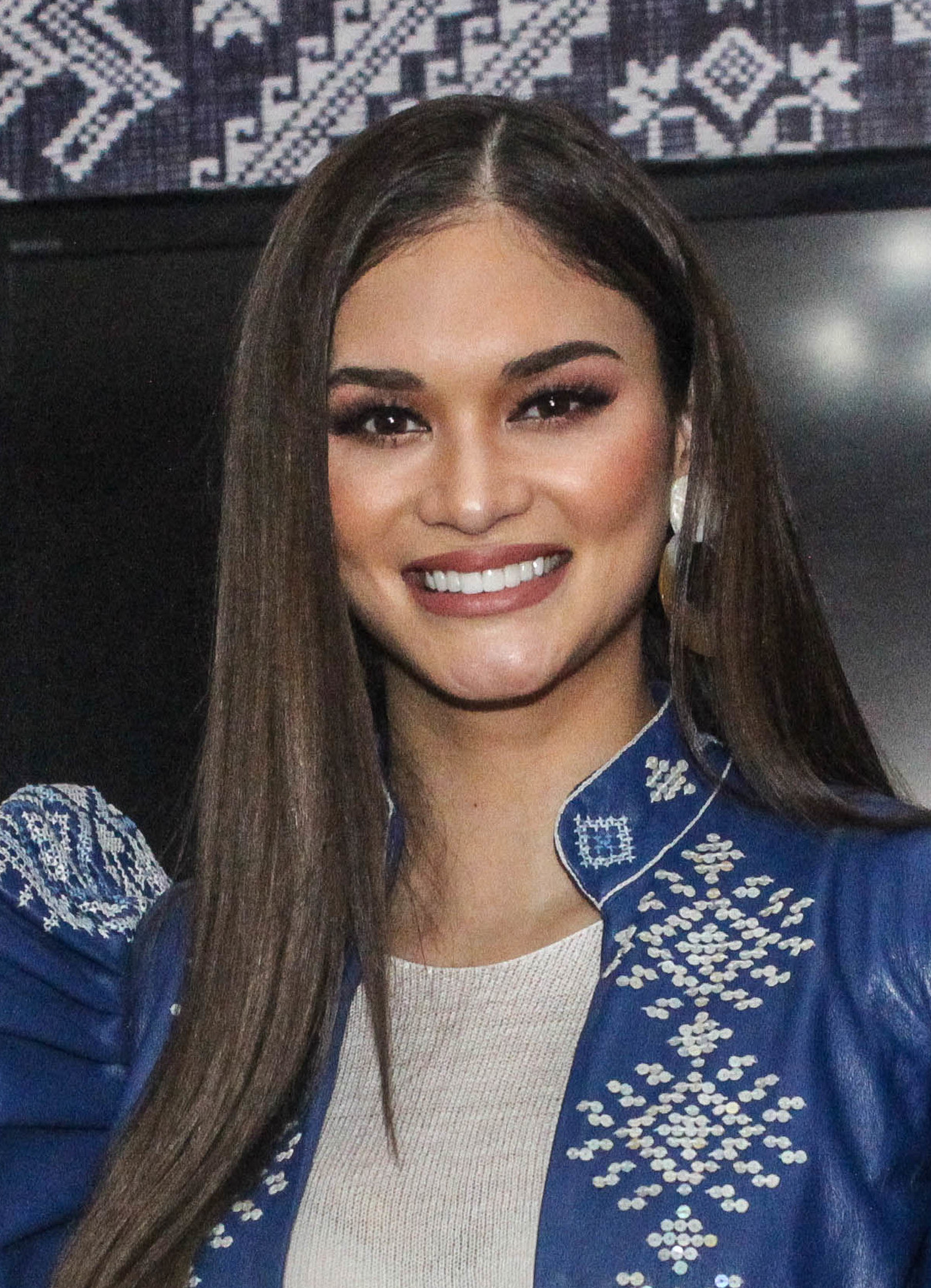
- Wurtzbach in 2019
- Born: Pia Alonzo Wurtzbach; September 24, 1989 (age 37); Stuttgart, Baden-Württemberg, West Germany
- Other name: Pia Romero
- Citizenship: Germany; Philippines
- Education: Center for Asian Culinary Studies (Culinary arts)
- Occupations: Actress; model; television presenter
- Height: 5 ft 8 in (173 cm)
- Spouse: Jeremy Jauncey (m. 2023)
- Beauty pageant titleholder
- Title: Miss Universe Philippines 2015; Miss Universe 2015
- Years active: 2001–present
- Major competitions: Binibining Pilipinas 2013; (1st Runner-Up); Binibining Pilipinas 2014; (Top 15); Binibining Pilipinas 2015; (Winner – Miss Universe Philippines 2015); Miss Universe 2015; (Winner) (Note: During the live telecast, at first, Miss Colombia 2014 Ariadna Gutiérrez was announced as the winner due to an announcement mistake by Steve Harvey. Once Harvey apologized to the audience, Gutiérrez was announced as the 1st Runner-Up, and Wurtzbach as the winner.)
- Website: piawurtzbach.com

Signature
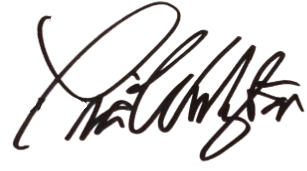

Pia Alonzo Wurtzbach-Jauncey (Tagalog: [ˈpiː.ɐ ʔɐˈloːn.so ˈwəːɾts.bɐk ˈd͡ʒoːn.si]; German: [ˈvʊʁtsbax]; English: /ˈwɜːrtsbæk, -bɑːk/ WURTS-ba(h)k; born September 24, 1989), formerly professionally known as Pia Romero, is a Filipino-German model, actress, and beauty queen best known for winning the title of Miss Universe 2015. Previously, Wurtzbach won Binibining Pilipinas in 2015. She became the first Filipina to win in four decades.

== Early life and education ==
Pia Alonzo Wurtzbach was born in Stuttgart, Germany, to a German father and a Filipina mother, and has a sister. The family later moved to Northern Mindanao region in the Philippines, first in Iligan, then settled in Cagayan de Oro, where she attended kindergarten at Kong Hua School and primary school at Corpus Christi School.

Her parents separated when she was 11 years old, and she became the family's main source of income by modeling and acting. After being raised in the Philippines, she spent several years in England. She finished her secondary education at ABS-CBN Distance Learning Center in Quezon City, Metro Manila, and studied culinary arts at the Center for Asian Culinary Studies in San Juan, Metro Manila. Wurtzbach speaks fluent Cebuano, English, and Tagalog. She also speaks basic German, which she described as "enough to get me a bratwurst".

== Acting career ==
Wurtzbach is a professional model, actress, host, and TV personality. She began acting at age four under the stage name Pia Romero. Managed by ABS-CBN Corporation's talent agency, Star Magic, she was included on the Star Circle Batch 11. Among her TV credits are the teen-oriented series K2BU, the concert variety program ASAP, the romance anthology Your Song, the sitcom show Bora, and the drama series Sa Piling Mo. She appeared in films such as Kung Ako Na Lang Sana (2003), All My Life (2004), and All About Love (2006). She went on to become a stylist, makeup artist and beauty writer for Philippine Daily Inquirers 2bU section.

== Pageantry ==
=== Early attempts at Binibining Pilipinas ===
Wurtzbach notably won the Miss Universe Philippines title on her third attempt. Prior to this, she first entered the Binibining Pilipinas pageant in 2013 where she was the first runner-up. She also won the Miss San Miguel Zero Fit and Sexy Body awards in the same year.

She then entered the Binibining Pilipinas pageant again in 2014 and finished at top 15. Pundits believe that her performance at the question and answer portion of the pageant, where she was asked by judge Senator Sonny Angara in Tagalog, which she also answered in Tagalog, affected her overall performance. She won Miss Philippine Airlines and She's So Jag awards.

=== Binibining Pilipinas 2015 ===
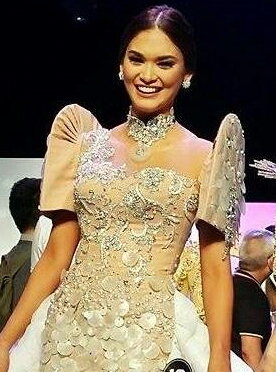
Wurtzbach during Binibining Pilipinas 2015

On her third attempt for the title in 2015, Wurtzbach won Miss Universe Philippines, alongside the Miss Cream Silk awards and went on to compete in the Miss Universe 2015 Pageant. During the question and answer portion of the pageant she was asked by then-Camarines Sur Representative Leni Robredo: "Social media is now a very powerful tool on communication. Can you tell us your thoughts about internet censorship?" She answered:

I think that we should be careful about what we post online, especially our thoughts and our opinions, that we don't hurt anybody, especially selfies, we have to be careful with what we post especially in our bodies, in our faces. So always think before you click.

On April 17, 2016, Wurtzbach crowned Maxine Medina as her successor at Binibining Pilipinas 2016 held at the Smart Araneta Coliseum in Quezon City, Philippines.

=== Miss Universe 2015 ===
Wurtzbach represented the Philippines in the 64th Miss Universe pageant, and won on December 20, 2015, in Las Vegas, Nevada, US. At the national costume competition, Wurtzbach wore a white capiz terno with a matching fan and headpiece. The whole ensemble was designed by Filipino designer Albert Andrada. She wore a red sleeveless crepe de chine gown by Filipino designer Oliver Tolentino at the preliminary evening gown competition.

At the coronation night, Wurtzbach reached the top 15. She wore a black and white two-piece bikini at the swimsuit competition and advanced to the top ten. She wore Albert Andrada's figure-hugging, strapless serpentina gown, inspired by the Philippines, "Pearl of the Orient". She then advanced to Top 5.

During the first question and answer round, Wurtzbach was asked by host Steve Harvey, "Earlier this year, there was a controversy in the Philippines about the United States reopening a military base in your country. Do you think the United States should have a military presence in your country?" She answered:

I think that the United States and the Philippines have always had a good relationship with each other. We were colonized by the Americans and we have their culture in our traditions even up to this day and I think that we're very welcoming with the Americans and I don't see any problem with that at all.

In the final question and answer portion, the top three contestants were asked the same question by Harvey: "Why should you be the next Miss Universe?" and she replied:

To be a Miss Universe is both an honor and responsibility. If I were to be Miss Universe, I will use my voice to influence the youth, and I would raise awareness to certain causes like HIV awareness that is timely and relevant to my country which is the Philippines. I want to show the world, the universe rather, that I am confidently beautiful with a heart. Thank you.

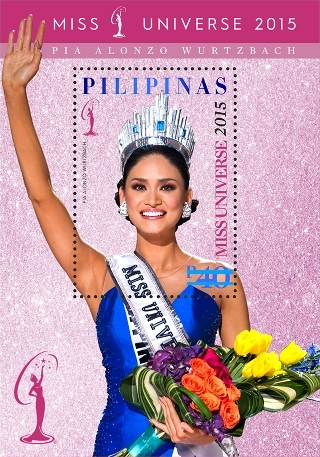
A commemorative stamp issued by the Philippine Post Office honoring Wurtzbach

At the end of the contest, host Steve Harvey mistakenly announced Miss Colombia Ariadna Gutiérrez as the winner. However, after Gutiérrez's crowning, Harvey returned to the stage and stated that he had misread the results and that Wurtzbach was the real winner. Paulina Vega (Miss Universe 2014) then removed the crown from Gutiérrez's head and placed it on Wurtzbach's head.

Wurtzbach is the third Filipina Miss Universe titleholder, following Gloria Diaz in 1969, Margie Moran in 1973, and was succeeded by Catriona Gray three years later. In addition, she is also the first biracial Filipina to win the Miss Universe title.

On January 23, 2016, she arrived in the Philippines for a week-long homecoming celebration with visits to the cities of Manila, Makati, Pasay and Quezon City. She also made courtesy calls to both Houses of the Congress of the Philippines - the Senate of the Philippines and the House of Representatives of the Philippines, as well as to the President of the Philippines at the Malacañang Palace.

On February 1, 2016, she arrived in San Francisco to fulfill her duties as Inside Edition's special correspondent for Super Bowl 50. While in San Francisco, she was also reunited with Janine Tugonon, Miss Universe 2012 1st Runner-up from the Philippines.

On February 28, 2016, she travelled to Toronto, Canada to deliver a speech against bullying at the Speakers Forum for the International Students of the Language Academy of Canada wherein she shared some of her childhood experiences as a victim of bullying. During her stay in Canada, she was reunited with Miss Universe Canada 2015, Paola Nunez Valdez. She also met and gave some advice to the contestants of Miss Universe Canada 2016.

She also met and gave advice to the candidates of Binibining Pilipinas 2016 during their press presentation. On April 12, 2016, she returned to the Philippines for the Binibining Pilipinas 2016 pageant and on April 17 crowned her successor Maxine Medina as Miss Universe Philippines 2016 during the coronation night. During the pageant she was reunited with Miss Myanmar 2015, May Barani Thaw and Miss Malaysia 2015, Vanessa Tevi while Miss USA 2015, who at Miss Universe, placed second runner-up, Olivia Jordan served as a judge.

On April 21, 2016, Wurtzbach arrived in Peru to attend Miss Peru 2016 pageant where she served as a judge. She also had a press conference a day before the pageant and was greeted by the Lima City Mayor, Luis Castaneda and received an honor of being "The Distinguished Guest of Lima". Wurtzbach along with Miss Peru 2015, Laura Spoya crowned Valeria Piazza, Miss Peru 2016.

On April 27, 2016, Wurtzbach threw out the ceremonial first pitch for the New York Mets. A month later on May 27, 2016, Wurtzbach travelled to Machala, Ecuador to help the victims of the recent earthquake that killed at least 600 people. She was welcomed by the mayor of Machala, Carlos Falquez Batallas to the city and was named as an honorary volunteer of the Guayas Red Cross wherein she was invited to participate in the global appeal of raise resources to build 6,000 homes for the earthquake victims. She was also given a chance to meet Connie Jiménez, Miss Ecuador 2016 during her visit.

In June 2016, Wurtzbach represented the Philippines and the Miss Universe Organization at a meeting of the United Nations that aimed at ending AIDS.

As Miss Universe, Wurtzbach also visited Indonesia, Ecuador, Cayman Islands, Thailand, Panama, United Arab Emirates, and Singapore.

As a parting gift on her final official photoshoot, Wurtzbach was granted access to the elusive Mikimoto Crown. On January 30, 2017, at the Mall of Asia Arena, Pasay, Philippines, Wurtzbach ended her reign and crowned Iris Mittenaere of France as Miss Universe 2016.

== Post Miss Universe ==
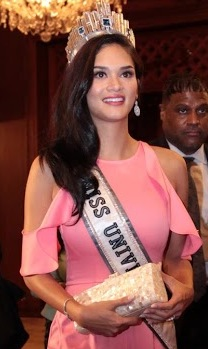
Wurtzbach in 2016

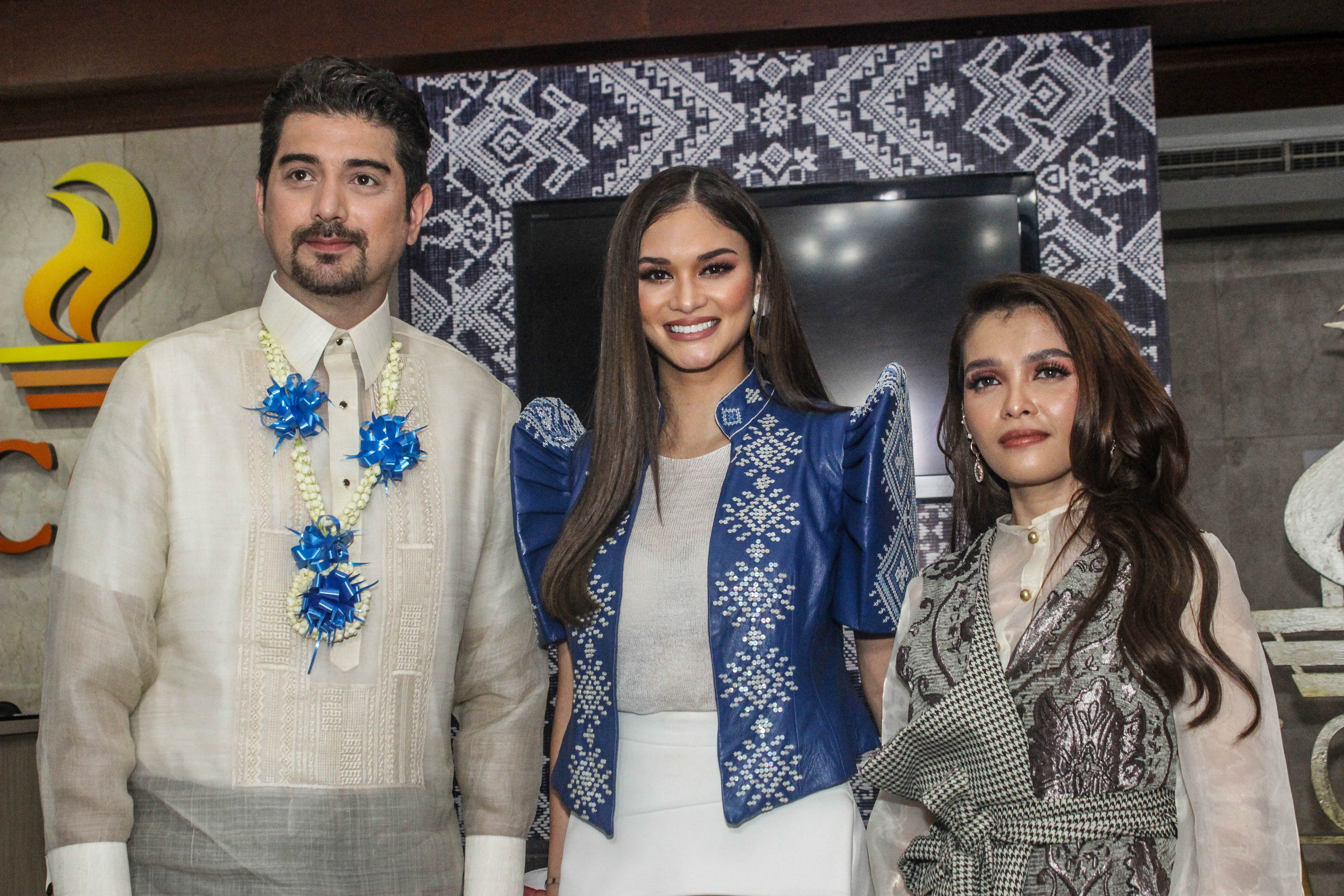
Wurtzbach with NAM2019 Arts Ambassadors Ian Veneracion and KZ Tandingan.

On January 30, 2017, Wurtzbach stated that she has signed a contract with WME/IMG's IMG Universe division where she will continue to work with the Miss Universe Organization as an HIV/AIDS awareness advocate after her reign.

She was a guest judge on several episodes of Asia's Next Top Model fifth cycle.

On June 3, 2017, Liza Soberano portrayed the role of Wurtzbach in her life story on Maalaala Mo Kaya's episode entitled "Korona".

She costarred with Vice Ganda and Daniel Padilla in a film under production of Star Cinema. The project served as her acting comeback after six years and her first film in more than a decade. The film entitled Gandarrapido: The Revenger Squad served as one of the eight official film entries in the 2017 Metro Manila Film Festival.

Wurtzbach served as a judge during the final coronation night of Miss Universe 2017.

She starred in another Star Cinema movie entitled My Perfect You alongside Gerald Anderson.

Wurtzbach co-hosted Binibining Pilipinas 2018 with Nicole Cordoves and Richard Gutierrez. She was featured as the 2019 calendar girl for the liquor brand Ginebra. This was her first swimsuit photoshoot since competing in the Miss Universe pageant.

In 2019, Wurtzbach participated in the 2019 Southeast Asian Games opening ceremony.

On April 29, 2024, she was received the Global Fashion Influencer of the Year award at the 2024 EMIGALA Fashion & Beauty Awards in Dubai.

Wurtzbach attended the 2024 Paris Fashion Week where she walked at the L'Oreal's Le Défilé "Walk Your Worth" show alongside Kendall Jenner, Cara Delevingne, Eva Longoria, Viola Davis, Camilla Cabello, Jane Fonda, and Simone Ashley, becoming the first Filipina celebrity to model in a runway show by a beauty brand at Paris Fashion Week.

== Personal life ==
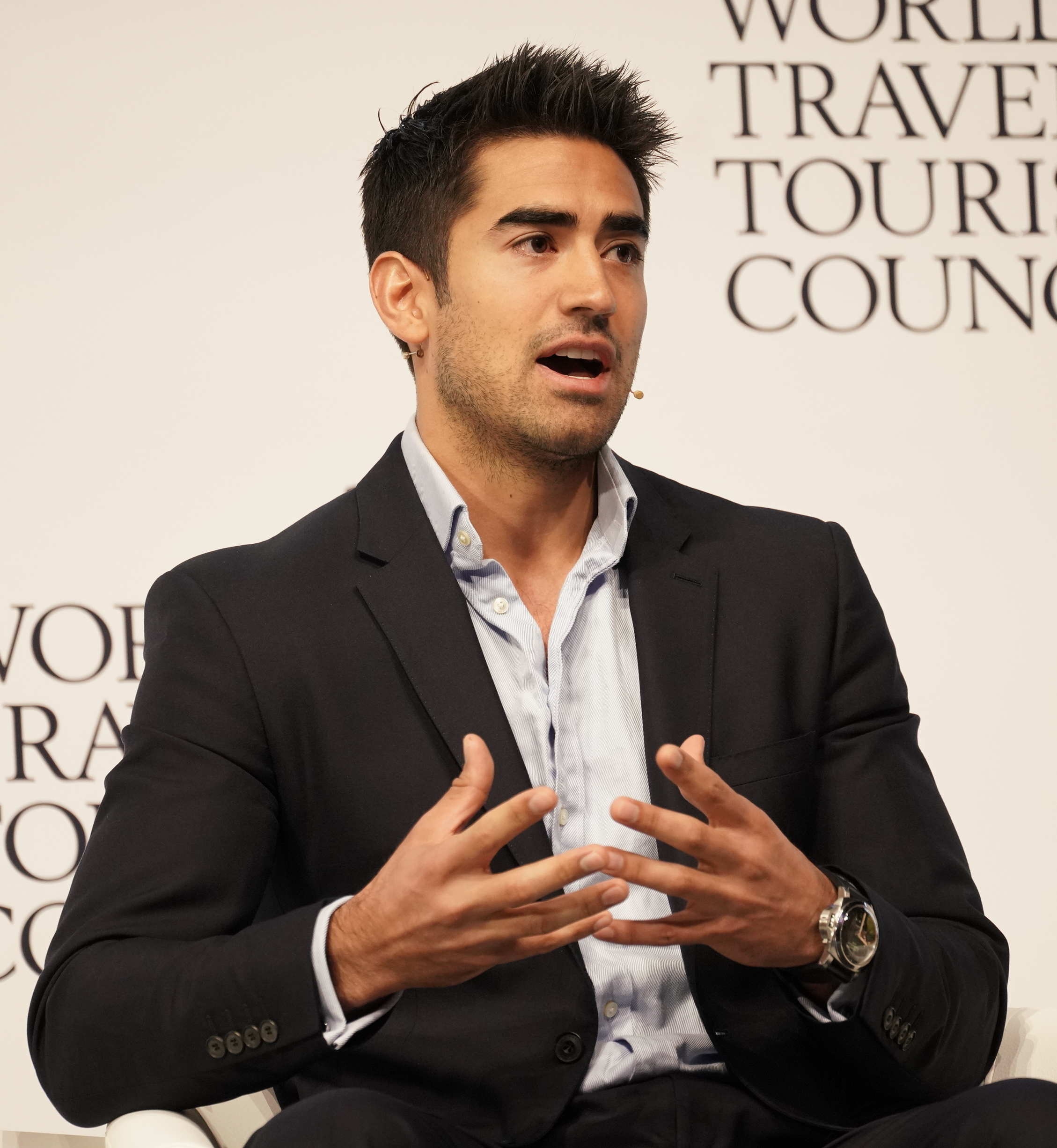
Jeremy Jauncey in 2019

Wurtzbach is a practicing Roman Catholic, and openly supports views contrary to the teachings of the Catholic Church, particularly the distribution of birth control via full implementation of the Philippines' Reproductive Health Law and the recognition of LGBT rights in the Philippines.

Wurtzbach is an advocate for gender equality. On Instagram, she declared her support for the LGBT community in light of the Orlando nightclub shooting in 2016. In 2018, she called on the Philippine Senate to pass the SOGIE Equality Bill. In 2017, Wurtzbach was named a UNAIDS Goodwill Ambassador for Asia and the Pacific.

In 2017, Wurtzbach tweeted that she intended to remain unmarried and childfree. However, in June 2020, she confirmed her relationship with Scottish entrepreneur Jeremy Jauncey. Two years later, they announced their engagement. Her marriage on March 24, 2023, was only announced on May 5. The venue of their wedding was held in North Island, Seychelles.

== Filmography ==
=== Television ===
Year	Title	Role	Notes	Source
2001	Click	Frankie	Episode: "...Nung Nagka-ampon sila Gio..."	
2002	K2BU	Jewel		
2002–2006; 2016–present	ASAP	Herself/Performer		
2003–04	It Might Be You	Allison/Mary Lou		
2003	Wansapanataym	Alex	Episode: "Meow"	
2004	Wansapanataym	Garden Fairy	Episode: "Ang Hardin ng mga Wenekleks"	
2004	Wansapanataym		Episode: "Dragonesa"	
2005	Maalaala Mo Kaya	Cecille's sister	Episode: "Manok"	
2005–06	Bora: Sons of the Beach	Pia	Credited as Pia Romero	
2006	Sa Piling Mo	Julia		
2011	Maalaala Mo Kaya	Elaine	Episode: "Stroller"; Credited as Pia Wurtzbach	
2011	Maalaala Mo Kaya	Michelle	Episode: "Birth Certificate"	
2012	Maalaala Mo Kaya	Marilou	Episode: "Komiks"	
2012	Aryana	Dikya/Jelay	Special guest appearance	
2012	Third Eye	Sari	Episode: "Sirena sa Breakwater"	
2017	Asia's Next Top Model cycle 5	Herself	Recurring guest / judge	
2017	Maalaala Mo Kaya	Herself (archived footage)	Episode: "Korona"	
2017	It's Showtime	Herself	Guest co-host	
2019	World of Dance Philippines	Herself - Host		
2022	My Papa Pi	Tere	Main role	

=== Film ===
Year	Title	Role	Notes	Source
2003	Kung Ako Na Lang Sana	young Chari	Credited as Pia Romero	
2004	All My Life	Sarah		
2006	All About Love	Carmi		
2017	Gandarrapido: The Revenger Squad	Cassandra "Cassey" Mariposque / Cassandra Stockings / Kweenie		
2018	My Perfect You	Abi / Abie "Bie" Marie Garcia-Molina		

== Awards and nominations ==
Organization	Year	Work	Category	Result	Source
Emigala Awards	2024	Pia Wurtzbach	Global Fashion Influencer of the Year	Won	
PMPC Star Awards for Movies	2018	Gandarrapido: The Revenger Squad	New Movie Actress of the Year	Won	

== See also ==
- Philippines at major beauty pageants

== Notes ==
Awards and achievements
Preceded by (Colombia) Paulina Vega	Miss Universe; 2015	Succeeded by (France) Iris Mittenaere
Preceded by Mary Jean Lastimosa (Cotabato)	Miss Universe Philippines; 2015	Succeeded by Maxine Medina (Quezon City)
Preceded by Elaine Moll (Northern Samar)	Binibining Pilipinas (1st Runner-Up); 2013	Succeeded by Laura Lehmann (Makati)
