= Dutch Reformed Church Windhoek =

Congregation of the Dutch Reformed Church in Namibia

The Dutch Reformed Church Windhoek (Afrikaans: NG gemeente Windhoek) or NGK Windhoek is the oldest congregation of the Dutch Reformed Church in South Africa (NGK) in Windhoek the capital of Namibia.

== Background ==
Windhoek was a district on the outskirts of the large settlement of Gibeon when the eponymous Gibeon congregation was founded in 1898, and Gibeon would later be renamed Mariental. However, the Afrikaner population of Windhoek grew to the point where a new church needed to be planned in 1925, and Rev. Leonard moved from Gibeon to Windhoek. In 1928, the Gibeon church council decided to split off separate congregations for Windhoek, Gobabis, and Okahandja. Hence, the Dutch Reformed Church Gobabis and Dutch Reformed Church Okahandja were spun off in 1939 and 1946, respectively. In northern Namibia, the Dutch Reformed Church Otjiwarongo (at first called Moria) was founded in 1902.

== Foundation ==
Dr. Karel Wynand le Roux came from Gibeon and was confirmed in May 1929 as founding pastor. The congregation began amidst severe drought and the Great Depression. The destitute congregation spent its way deeply into debt. An empty house owned by the South West African Mines had to be bought as a parsonage for £2,750 and mortgaged for £2,000. Extra halls had to be built in Okahandja, Gobabis, and elsewhere.

By the end of 1931, the congregation was £200 behind current expenses and had accumulated £2,500 in debt. Despite holding fundraisers, the congregation could not find the money to pay their secretary and organist who were thus asked to volunteer their services.

== Growth ==
After 1933, the Depression began to abate and the congregation's finances gradually improved. Therefore, the church council decided to appoint a temporary curate to assist the minister in serving a very large area. A fund was established to hire one, and Stephanus Hofmeyr van der Spuy was hired on a six-month basis.

The Rev. Le Roux was helped by a succession of curates during this period. By the end of 1944, the congregation could afford to hire Andreas Petrus Morgenthal as a co-teacher. After 18 years with the congregation, Dr. Le Roux retired in 1947, succeeded by Johannes Hendrik Steenkamp. Dr. Morgenthal was succeeded in March 1950 by J.H. van Rooyen.

The congregation began fundraising in the 1940s to build a new church building. Construction started in 1950 and finished in March 1951.

== Daughter churches ==
Over the years, eight NGK congregations have directly or indirectly separated from the NGK Windhoek.

1959 - Windhoek-North 1966 - Windhoek-Highlands 1955 - Windhoek-West (split from Windhoek) 1957 - Windhoek-Eros (split from Windhoek) 1960 - Windhoek-East (split from Windhoek) 1965 - Suiderhof (split from Windhoek) 1970 - Pioneers Park (split from Windhoek-West) 1973 - Academia (split from Suiderhof)

Windhoek-North and Windhoek-Highlands were eventually combined into Windhoek-Northland before being folded into Windhoek-West, bringing the number of NG congregations in the city down from an all-time high of 9 down to 7.

Other spinoff congregations include:

1938 - Gobabis 1946 - Okahandja

== Select pastors ==
- Karel Wynand le Roux, 1929-1946 (emeritus)
- Stephanus Hofmeyr van der Spuy, 1935–1938
- Andreas Petrus Morgenthal, 1945–1948
- Johannes Hendrik Steenkamp, 1947–1970
- Carel Johannes Hugo, 1953–1955, subsequently first pastor at Windhoek-West
- Paul Albertus du Toit, October 10, 1970 – December 4, 1988 (emeriteer)
- Petrus Jacobus le Roux, February 12, 1972 – 1977
- Martin Brand, 1977-1983 (remained at Windhoek-East until 1987)
- Jacobus Petrus Jooste, 1983–1985

== Sources ==
- Paul Olivier (ed.) 1952. Ons gemeentelike feesalbum ("Our congregational festive album"). Kaapstad en Pretoria: N.G. Kerk-Uitgewers (Cape Town and Pretoria:NGK Publishing).
