= Nicole Cordoves =

Filipino model and host (born 1992)

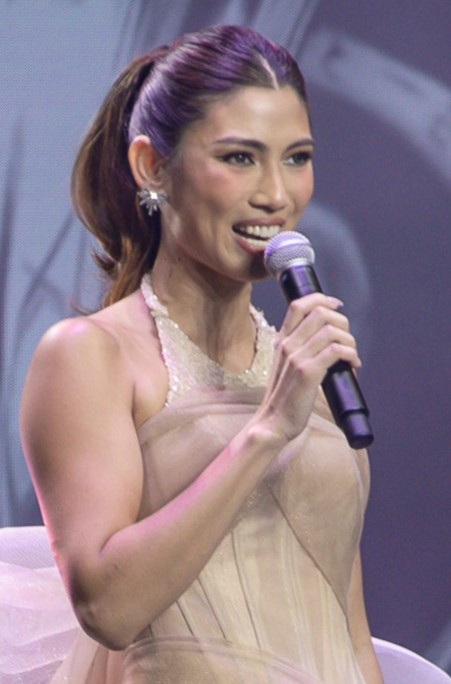
- Cordoves hosting Binibining Pilipinas 2022
- Born: Nicole Ignacio Cordoves; April 15, 1992 (age 34); Makati, Philippines
- Education: Ateneo de Manila University
- Height: 1.75 m (5 ft 9 in)
- Beauty pageant titleholder
- Title: Binibining Pilipinas Grand International 2016
- Major competitions: Binibining Pilipinas 2016 (Winner – Binibining Pilipinas Grand International 2016); Miss Grand International 2016 (1st Runner-Up)
- Website: linky.ph/nicolecordoves

Nicole Ignacio Cordoves (Tagalog: [nɪˈkoʊl ʔɪɡˈnaʃo kɔɾˈdɔbɛs]; born April 15, 1992) is a Filipino model, host, and beauty pageant titleholder who was crowned Binibining Pilipinas Grand International 2016. She represented the Philippines at the Miss Grand International 2016 pageant and finished as 1st Runner-Up.

== Early and personal life ==
Cordoves has Filipino-Chinese ancestry. She graduated from Ateneo de Manila University with a degree in Economics, minoring in Development Management.

Her brother, Joshua is married to Binibining Pilipinas International 2019 Bea Magtanong.

== Pageantry ==
=== Competitions ===
Cordoves won Miss Chinatown 2014. She was crowned 1st runner-up at Miss Grand International 2016, having been chosen to represent the Philippines at the pageant as Binibining Pilipinas Grand International 2016.

=== Hosting ===
She co-hosted Miss Grand International 2017 pageant with Xian Lim in Vietnam. She also co-hosted Binibining Pilipinas 2018 with Pia Wurtzbach and Richard Gutierrez. In 2021, Cordoves and Catriona Gray co-hosted the 57th Binibining Pilipinas, the first pageant in the Philippines with all-female hosts, earning critical acclaim. She teamed up with 2020 Miss Grand International runner-up Samantha Bernardo for a photo shoot prior to the pageant. Cordoves, Gray, Bernardo and Edward Barber co-hosted Binibining Pilipinas 2022. She returned as co-host with Gray and Mary Jean Lastimosa for Binibining Pilipinas 2023.

== Career ==
She worked as a speechwriter for Cesar Purisima, the former Secretary of Finance. Cordoves is a Miss Q and A judge on It's Showtime, and is one of the co-hosts of Dr. Care and Pasok Mga Suki on PIE Channel with journalist Migs Bustos and online business personality Madam Inutz. She is also a judge on Drag Den Philippines, hosted by Manila Luzon.

Cordoves had a supporting role in the Filipino series One Good Day, which aired on Amazon Prime Video, and also appeared as a contestant of Rainbow Rumble, which aired on Kapamilya Channel, A2Z and All TV.

In 2025, She was recognized by the Global South World as one of the Top 50 most influential journalists on TikTok in Southeast Asia.

== Filmography ==
=== Film ===
| Year | Title | Role |
|---|---|---|
| 2025 | Call Me Mother | herself |

Awards and achievements
| Preceded by (Australia) Claire Elizabeth Parker | Miss Grand International (1st Runner-Up); 2016 | Succeeded by (Venezuela) Tulia Aleman |
| Preceded by Parul Shah | Binibining Pilipinas Grand International; 2016 | Succeeded by Elizabeth Clenci |
