= Binibining Pilipinas 2019 =

56th Binibining Pilipinas pageant

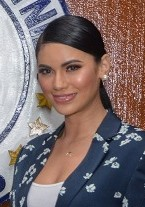
- Gazini Ganados, Miss Universe Philippines 2019
- Date: June 9, 2019
- Presenters: Richard Gutierrez; Anne Curtis; Nicole Cordoves
- Entertainment: Engkanto Reggae Band; BoybandPH
- Theme: Raise Your Flag
- Venue: Smart Araneta Coliseum, Quezon City, Philippines
- Broadcaster: ABS-CBN
- Entrants: 40
- Placements: 25
- Winner: Gazini Ganados; Talisay, Cebu
- Congeniality: Marie Sherry Ann Tormes; Polangui, Albay
- Best National Costume: Emma Mary Tiglao; Pampanga
- Photogenic: Gazini Ganados; Talisay, Cebu

Binibining Pilipinas 2019 was the 56th edition of the Binibining Pilipinas pageant, held at the Smart Araneta Coliseum in Quezon City, Metro Manila, Philippines, on June 9, 2019.

At the end of the event, Catriona Gray crowned Gazini Ganados as Miss Universe Philippines 2019, Ahtisa Manalo crowned Bea Magtanong as Binibining Pilipinas International 2019, Jehza Huelar crowned Resham Saeed as Binibining Pilipinas Supranational 2019, Karen Gallman crowned Emma Tiglao as Binibining Pilipinas Intercontinental 2019, Eva Psyche Patalinjug crowned Samantha Lo as Binibining Pilipinas Grand International 2019, and Michele Gumabao crowned Leren Bautista as Binibining Pilipinas Globe 2019. Maria Andrea Abesamis was named first runner-up, while Samantha Bernardo was named second runner-up.

Maria Andrea Abesamis took over the Binibining Pilipinas-Grand International 2019 title after Lo resigned the title on November 27, 2019. Following the pageant, second runner-up Samantha Bernardo was appointed as Binibining Pilipinas Grand International 2020.

The 2019 edition marked the first time Binibining Pilipinas Charities, Inc. (BPCI) collaborated with the newly established Miss Universe Philippines Organization, owned by the LCS Group, which introduced new changes and upgrades to the pre-pageant activities, coordinations and the pageant itself.

This was also the last edition to contest the Miss Universe Philippines and Miss Supranational Philippines titles under Binibining Pilipinas after the franchises of Miss Universe Philippines and Miss Supranational Philippines were transferred to the Miss Universe Philippines Organization and the Miss World Philippines Organization respectively.

== Pageant ==
=== Board of judges ===
- James Reid – actor, performer, and producer
- Bobby Barreiro – head of integrated events and customer engagement for ABS-CBN
- Brian Cu – president of Grab Philippines
- Nadine Lustre – actress and performer
- Giorgio Guglielmino – Italian ambassador to the Philippines
- Christian Standhardinger – Filipino-German professional basketball player
- Rainerio Borja – president of Asian Region for Alorica
- Gloria Diaz — actress and Miss Universe 1969 from the Philippines
- Daniel Padilla – actor and performer
- Jorge Moragas – Spanish ambassador to the Philippines
- Joy Belmonte — mayor-elect of Quezon City and chairwoman of Board of Judges

== Results ==
=== Placements ===
Color keys

- The contestant was a runner-up in an International pageant.
- The contestant was a semi-finalist in an International pageant.
- The contestant did not place.

Placement	Contestant	International placement
Miss Universe Philippines 2019	Bb. #12 Talisay City – Gazini Ganados	Top 20 – Miss Universe 2019
Binibining Pilipinas International 2019	Bb. #17 Bataan – Bea Patricia Magtanong	Top 8 – Miss International 2019
Binibining Pilipinas Supranational 2019	Bb. #30 Maguindanao – Resham Saeed	Top 25 – Miss Supranational 2019
Binibining Pilipinas Grand International 2019	Bb. #25 Cebu – Samantha Ashley Lo (Resigned)	Unplaced – Miss Grand International 2019
Binibining Pilipinas Intercontinental 2019	Bb. #26 Pampanga – Emma Tiglao	Top 20 – Miss Intercontinental 2019
Binibining Pilipinas Globe 2019	Bb. #14 Laguna – Leren Bautista	2nd runner-up – The Miss Globe 2019
1st runner-up	Bb. #13 Pasig – Maria Andrea Abesamis (Assumed as Binibining Pilipinas Grand International 2019)	
2nd runner-up	Bb. #27 Palawan – Samantha Bernardo (Appointed as Binibining Pilipinas Grand International 2020)	1st runner-up – Miss Grand International 2020
Top 15	Bb. #1 Malabon – Jessica Marasigan; Bb. #8 Dumaguete – Joahnna Carla Saad; Bb. #10 Marikina – Marianne Marquez; Bb. #15 Sorsogon – Maria Isabela Galeria; Bb. #18 Masbate – Hannah Arnold; Bb. #22 Zamboanga City – April May Short; Bb. #38 Negros Occidental – Vickie Rushton	
Top 25	Bb. #3 Muntinlupa – Martina Fausta Diaz; Bb. #4 Zamboanga Sibugay – Malka Shaver; Bb. #6 Davao del Sur – Jane Darren Genobisa; Bb. #7 Rizal – Honey Grace Cartasano; Bb. #11 Polangui, Albay – Marie Sherry Ann Tormes; Bb. #16 Catanduanes – Louisielle Denise Omorog; Bb. #23 Quezon City – Larah Grace Lacap; Bb. #33 Puerto Princesa – Jessarie Dumaguing; Bb. #35 La Union – Kimberle Penchon; Bb. #40 Caloocan – Joanna Tolledo	

=== Special awards ===
Award	Contestant
Miss Ever Bilena	Bb. #38 Negros Occidental — Vickie Rushton
Miss Blackwater	Bb. #27 Palawan — Samantha Bernardo
Miss EB Advance	Bb. #26 Pampanga — Emma Tiglao
Miss Careline	Bb. #1 Malabon — Jessica Marasigan
Pitoy Moreno Best in National Costume	Bb. #26 Pampanga — Emma Tiglao
Miss Jag Denim Queen	Bb. #38 Negros Occidental — Vickie Rushton
Manila Bulletin Reader's Choice	Bb. #38 Negros Occidental — Vickie Rushton
Best in Talent	Bb. #29 Bacolod — Cassandra Chan
Bb. Friendship	Bb. #11 Polangui, Albay — Sherry Ann Tormes
Face of Binibini (Miss Photogenic)	Bb. #12 Talisay, Cebu — Gazini Ganados
Binibining Philippine Airlines	Bb. #3 Muntinlupa — Martina Diaz
Best in Swimsuit	Bb. #17 Bataan — Bea Magtanong
Best in Long Gown	Bb. #12 Talisay, Cebu — Gazini Ganados
Miss Cream Silk	Bb. #38 Negros Occidental — Vickie Rushton
Miss Pizza Hut	Bb. #26 Pampanga — Emma Tiglao
Poten Cee Gandang Palaban	Bb. #38 Negros Occidental — Vickie Rushton
Bb. Megawide	Bb. #17 Bataan — Bea Magtanong

== Contestants ==
Forty contestants competed for the six titles.

No.	Locality	Contestant	Age (Note: Ages at the time of the pageant)	Notes
1	Malabon	Jessica Marasigan	25	Previously Miss Philippines Water 2017
2	Pangasinan	Denielle Joie Magno	25	
3	Muntinlupa	Martina Faustina Diaz	22	
4	Zamboanga Sibugay	Malka Shaver	24	
5	Iloilo City	Sigrid Grace Flores	27	
6	Davao del Sur	Jane Darren Genobisa	22	
7	Rizal	Honey Grace Cartasano	25	
8	Dumaguete	Joahnna Carla Saad	26	
9	Negros Oriental	Melba Ann Macasaet	26	
10	Marikina	Marianne Marquez	26	
11	Polangui, Albay	Marie Sherry Ann Quintana Tormes	27	
12	Talisay, Cebu	Gazini Christiana Jordi Ganados	23	Top 20 semi-finalist at Miss Universe 2019; Best National Costume at Miss Universe 2019
13	Pasig	Maria Andrea Abesamis	27	
14	Laguna	Leren Mae Bautista	26	Second runner-up at The Miss Globe 2019; Top 10 semi-finalist at Miss Universe Philippines 2021
15	Sorsogon	Maria Isabela Galeria	20	Supposedly competed at Miss Universe Philippines 2020 but withdrew
16	Catanduanes	Louisielle Denise Omorog	24	
17	Bataan	Bea Patricia Magtanong	25	Top 8 finalist at Miss International 2019
18	Masbate	Hannah Arnold	23	Later won Binibining Pilipinas International 2021; Later Top 15 semi-finalist at Miss International 2022
19	Mandaue	Ilene Astrid de Vera	23	Previously Mutya ng Pilipinas Asia Pacific International 2017; Previously fourth runner-up at Miss Asia Pacific International 2017
20	Daraga, Albay	Julia Eugenie Saubier	24	Top 10 semi-finalist at Miss Universe Philippines 2022
21	Isabela	Pauline Anne Barker	27	
22	Zamboanga City	April May Short	24	
23	Quezon City	Larah Grace Lacap	25	
24	Ilocos Sur	Jean Nicole Guerrero	25	
25	Cebu	Samantha Ashley Lo	26	Competed at Miss Grand International 2019
26	Pampanga	Emma Mary Tiglao	24	Top 20 semi-finalist at Miss Intercontinental 2019
27	Palawan	Samantha Mae Bernardo	26	Appointed as Binibining Pilipinas Grand International 2020; Later first runner-up at Miss Grand International 2020
28	Bulacan	Rubee Marie Faustino	23	
29	Bacolod	Cassandra Colleen Chan	24	
30	Maguindanao	Resham Saeed	25	Top 25 semi-finalist at Miss Supranational 2019
31	San Pablo, Laguna	Danielle Isabelle Dolk	18	
32	Tarlac	Mary Faye Murphy	22	
33	Puerto Princesa	Jessarie Dumaguing	24	
34	Batangas	Alanis Reign Binoya	22	
35	La Union	Kimberle Mae Penchon	26	
36	Libon, Albay	Francia Layderos	26	
37	Cavite	Samantha Mae Poblete	22	
38	Negros Occidental	Vickie Marie Milagrosa Rushton	27	
39	Caraga	Dia Nicole Magno	24	
40	Caloocan	Joanna Rose Tolledo	25	
