= Windhoek Afrikaanse Privaatskool =

Location
- Windhoek; Namibia
- Coordinates: 22.5455°S 17.0925°E

Information
- Opened: 4 March 1995
- Principal: Kobus Espach
- Website: www.wap.edu.na

Windhoek Afrikaanse Privaatskool, commonly referred to as WAP, is a private school in Windhoek, Namibia. It is the only school in Windhoek which educates its pupils in the Afrikaans medium. Registered since 1995 at the Namibian Ministry of Basic Education, Sport and Culture, it welcomes pupils to grades 1 through 12. Admissions to the institution are based on the prerequisites set by the Constitution of the Republic of Namibia.

== History ==
The school was officially opened on 4 March 1995. The first principal of the school was Piet Burger who served only for one year. In 1996 he was succeeded by Johan Esbach. Under his management, the school was re-registered in 2004 as an educational institution welcoming pupils in grades 1 through 12 of the Namibian Education System. Pupils in grade 12 write an external examination by an independent examinations authority in South Africa called IEB. This differs from other schools in Namibia who Write external examinations from Cambridge University's Local Examination Syndicate in Namibia. In 2004, Mr Attie van Wyk took over as General Manager of the School.

== Management ==
Initially the school was run as a company making a profit. After review, this was however changed into a complete educational institution. At present, the School is managed internally by four individuals who take care of the day-to-day functions of the entitlement. They are:

Primary School Manager - Elna de Jager
Extra Mural Manager - Kobus Espach
Pre-Primary School Manager - Ansie Krause

Furthermore, the school is also governed by an external governing authority which lay down the rules and regulations as well as makes the executive decisions and recruitment.

== Premises ==
The school was initially run on the premises of the Reformed Church Windhoek South and consisted of only 5 rooms. Growth in the school necessitated its further development, with additional estate acquired in September 1997 and even more in 2006. Since the beginning of 2007 the school has steadily increased in size and expanded its current buildings. At present, a new administrative block is being constructed while the remainder of the school is being upgraded.

== Education ==
The school makes use of two primary means of education; the syllabus by the Ministry of Basic Education, Sport and Culture for Namibians from grades 1 to 7 and IEB, the independent examinations body from South Africa for grades 8 to 12.

== Sport ==
Windhoek Afrikaanse Privaatskool competes in national and international sporting events. These include: Rugby, Netball, Hockey, Cricket, Tennis, Athletics, some indoor sports and also chess.

== Culture ==
The school offers numerous cultural events for pupils to take part in. This includes: cultural tours, cultural exhibitions, annual competitions and participation in the Windhoek Cultural Festival. Furthermore, the school takes great pride in its appearance and regard its emblem, flag, motto, core values, school uniform and anthem at part of its culture.

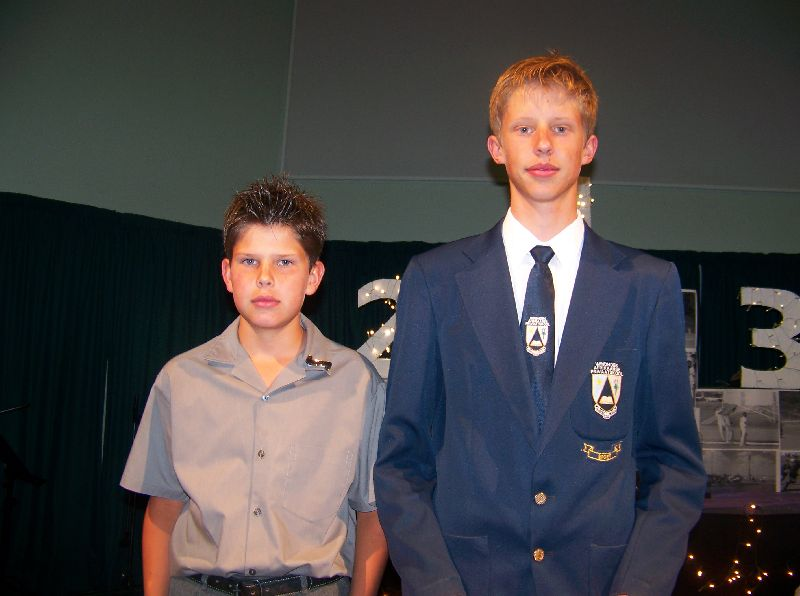
WAP Uniform
