= Miss Supranational 2021 =

12th Miss Supranational pageant, beauty pageant edition

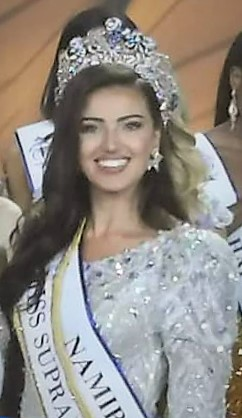
- Chanique Rabe, Miss Supranational 2021
- Date: 21 August 2021
- Presenters: Anna Matlewska; Ivan Podrez; Janick Maceta; Yaliza Burgos
- Theme: Aspirational • Inspirational
- Venue: Strzelecki Park Amphitheater, Nowy Sącz, Lesser, Poland
- Broadcaster: Polsat; Zoom TV India; Metro TV Indonesia; CNN Philippines; The Filipino Channel; NET 2 TV Ghana; Silverbird TV Nigeria; ATV Suriname; Globovisión
- Entrants: 58
- Placements: 24
- Withdrawals: Argentina; Australia; Barbados; Belarus; Cameroon; Costa Rica; Côte d'Ivoire; Croatia; Equatorial Guinea; Ethiopia; Guatemala; Honduras; Hungary; Laos; Lithuania; Macau; Mauritius; Myanmar; New Zealand; Northern Ireland; Scotland; Singapore; Sri Lanka; Turkey; Ukraine; United States Virgin Islands; Vietnam; Wales; Zambia
- Returns: Bahamas; China; El Salvador; Ghana; Greece; Guadeloupe; Guyana; Norway; South Sudan; Sweden
- Winner: Chanique Rabe; Namibia
- Congeniality: Nyisha Tilus; Bahamas
- Best National Costume: Jihane Almira Chedid; Indonesia
- Photogenic: Louise-Marie Losfeld; Belgium

Miss Supranational 2021 was the 12th edition of the Miss Supranational pageant. It was held on 21 August 2021, in Nowy Sącz, Poland. Anntonia Porsild of Thailand crowned Chanique Rabe of Namibia as her successor at the end of the event. This edition marks the first time in history that an African country won the Miss Supranational pageant.

The edition was originally scheduled at the end of 2020 but was postponed due to the global COVID-19 pandemic.

== Background ==
On 14 April 2021, Gerhard Parzutka von Lipinski, the president of Miss and Mister Supranational, announced that Miss Supranational 2021 is scheduled to be held on August 21 in Strzelecki Park Amphitheater, Nowy Sącz, Lesser, Poland.

== Results ==
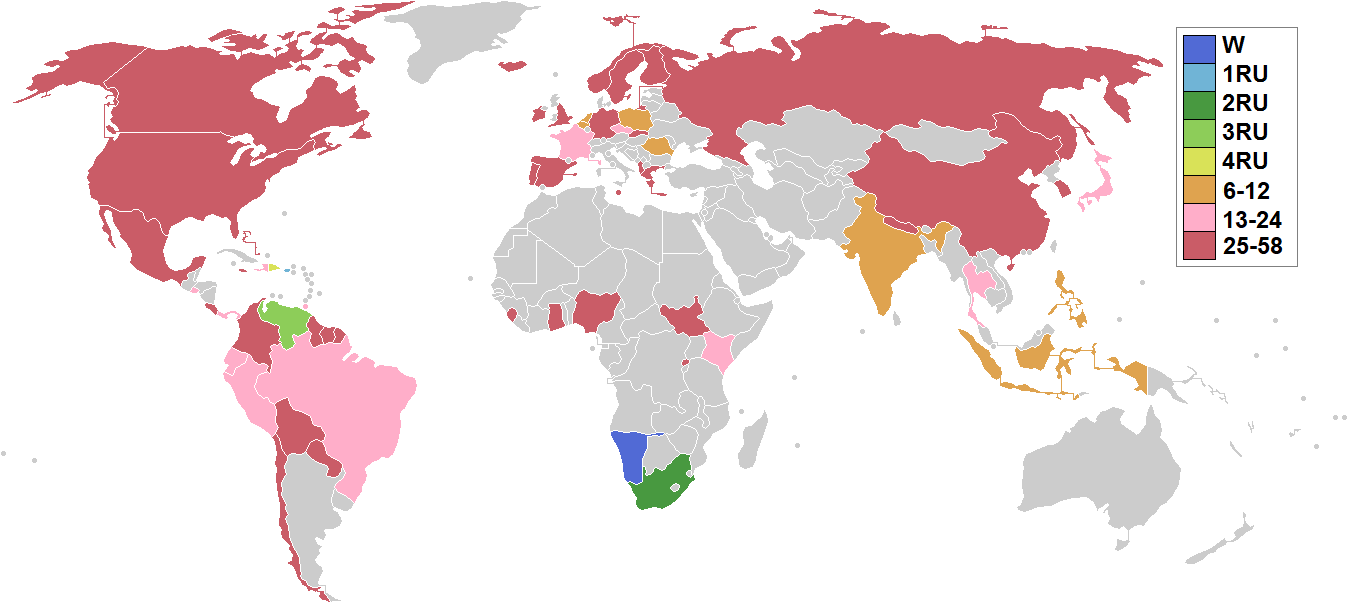
Countries and territories which sent delegates and results for Miss Supranational 2021

=== Placements ===
Placement	Contestant
Miss Supranational 2021	Namibia – Chanique Rabe
1st Runner-Up	Puerto Rico – Karla Guilfú
2nd Runner-Up	South Africa – Thato Mosehle
3rd Runner-Up	Venezuela – Valentina Sánchez Δ
4th Runner-Up	Dominican Republic – Eoanna Constanza
Top 12	Belgium – Louise-Marie Losfeld; India – Aavriti Choudhary; Indonesia – Jihane Almira Chedid §; Netherlands – Swelia Da Silva António; Philippines – Dindi Pajares; Poland – Natalia Balicka; Romania – Michela Ciornea
Top 24	Brazil – Deise Benício; Czech Republic – Angelika Kostyshynová; Ecuador – Justeen Cruz; El Salvador – Linda Sibrián; France – Judith Brumant-Lachoua; Haiti – Pascale Bélony; Japan – Emiri Shimizu; Kenya – Phidelia Mutunga Δ; Panama – Darelys Santos Δ; Peru – Solange Hermoza Rivera; Thailand – Queenie Benjarat; Trinidad and Tobago – Jenelle Thongs Δ

Notes:
§ – placed into the Top 12 by fan-voting challenge
Δ – placed into the Top 24 by fast-track challenges

=== Continental titleholders ===
Continent	Contestant	Ref.
Africa	Kenya – Phidelia Mutunga	
Americas	Brazil – Deise Benício	
Asia	Indonesia – Jihane Almira Chedid	
Caribbean	Haiti – Pascale Bélony	
Europe	Poland – Natalia Balicka	

=== Special awards ===
Award	Contestant	Ref.
Best National Costume	Indonesia – Jihane Almira Chedid	
Miss Congeniality	Bahamas – Nyisha Tilus	
Miss Photogenic	Belgium – Louise-Marie Losfeld	
Miss Talent	Ghana – Verónica Sarfo Adu Nti	
Miss Elegance	Puerto Rico – Karla Guilfú	

=== Fast track challenges ===
Challenge	Contestant	Ref.
Supra Chat	Trinidad and Tobago – Jenelle Thongs; Venezuela – Valentina Sánchez	
Supra Model of the Year	Panama – Darelys Santos	
Supra Influencer	Kenya – Phidelia Mutunga	
Supra Fan-Vote	Indonesia – Jihane Almira Chedid	

== Challenge events ==
=== Supra Chat ===
==== Round 1 ====
- Advanced to Semifinal 1
- Advanced to Semifinal 2

Group	Country 1	Country 2	Country 3	Country 4	Country 5	Country 6	Country 7	Country 8	Ref.
1	Bahamas	Canada	Guyana	India	Iceland	Malta	Suriname	Venezuela	
2	Colombia	Dominican Republic	Ecuador	El Salvador	Paraguay	Peru	—N/a		
3	Czech Republic	Finland	Germany	Kenya	Slovakia	—N/a			
4	Albania	Greece	Indonesia	Japan	South Korea	Norway	—N/a		
5	France	Nepal	Netherlands	Nigeria	Poland	Portugal	Sierra Leone	—N/a	
6	China	Haiti	Ireland	Puerto Rico	South Africa	Spain	United States	—N/a	
7	England	Ghana	Namibia	Philippines	Romania	Rwanda	Sweden	Thailand	
8	Bolivia	Brazil	Chile	Jamaica	Mexico	Panama	Trinidad and Tobago	—N/a	
9	Belgium	Guadeloupe	Russia	South Sudan	—N/a				

==== Semi-final ====
- Advanced to Top 24

Country	Semifinal 1	Semifinal 2
1	Venezuela	France
2	Peru	South Africa
3	Kenya	Philippines
4	Indonesia	Trinidad and Tobago

=== Supra Fan-Vote ===
The winner of the Supra Fan Vote will automatically advance to the Top 12 finalists of Miss Supranational 2021.

Final results	Country	Ref.
Winner	Indonesia – Jihane Almira Chedid	
Top 10	Canada – Sasha Lombardi; El Salvador – Linda Sibrián; Iceland – Dísa Dungal; Kenya – Phidelia Mutunga; Peru – Solange Hermoza Rivera; Philippines – Dindi Pajares; Sierra Leone – Ramatulai Jarata Wurie; South Africa – Thato Mosehle; Venezuela – Valentina Sánchez	

=== Top Model ===
The winner of Top Model will automatically advance to the Top 24 semifinalists of Miss Supranational 2021.

Final results	Country	Ref.
Winner	Panama – Darelys Santos	
Africa	South Sudan – Amelia Michael Sky	
Americas	Panama – Darelys Santos	
Asia	China – Alice Li	
Caribbean	Puerto Rico – Karla Guilfú	
Europe	Belgium – Louise-Marie Losfeld	

=== Miss Talent ===
Final results	Country	Ref.
Winner	Ghana – Verónica Sarfo Adu Nti	
1st Runner-Up	United States – Shivali Patel	
2nd Runner-Up	El Salvador – Linda Sibrián	
Top 5	Thailand – Benjarat Akkarawanichsil Aebi; Trinidad and Tobago – Jenelle Thongs	

=== Miss Elegance ===
Final results	Contestant	Ref.
Miss Elegance	Puerto Rico – Karla Guilfú	
1st Runner-Up	Philippines – Dindi Pajares	
2nd Runner-Up	Dominican Republic – Eoanna Constanza Santana	
Top 11	Belgium – Louise-Marie Losfeld; Brazil – Deise Benício; Czech Republic – Angelika Kostyshynová; Haiti – Pascale Bélony; Indonesia – Jihane Almira Chedid; Netherlands – Swelia Da Silva António; Poland – Natalia Balicka; Rwanda – Anitha Kate Umuratwa	

=== Supra Influencer ===
==== Challenge Finalists ====
Results	Country	Ref.
Challenge 1 (Top 15)	Bahamas – Nyisha Tilus; China – Alice Li; Colombia – Valentina Aldana; Dominican Republic – Eoanna Constanza Santana; Ecuador – Justeen Cruz; England – Sophie Marie Dunning; France – Judith Brumant-Lachoua; Haiti – Pascale Bélony; Iceland – Dísa Dungal; Indonesia – Jihane Almira Chedid; Kenya – Phidelia Mutunga; Peru – Solange Hermoza Rivera; Philippines – Dindi Pajares; Trinidad and Tobago – Jenelle Thongs; Venezuela – Valentina Sánchez	
Challenge 2 (Top 10)	El Salvador – Linda Sibrián; India – Aavriti Choudhary; Kenya – Phidelia Mutunga; Malta – Shailey Micallef; Namibia – Chanique Rabe; Netherlands – Swelia Da Silva António; Philippines – Dindi Pajares; Puerto Rico – Karla Guilfú; South Africa – Thato Mosehle; Venezuela – Valentina Sánchez	
Challenge 3 (Top 10)	China – Alice Li; Germany – Denisse Nicolle Ligpitan; Ireland – Jessica Marie Hopper; Jamaica – Lawnda Shantell Jackson; Peru – Solange Hermoza Rivera; Philippines – Dindi Pajares; Spain – Dana Tomuta; Suriname – Farisha Tjin-Asjoe; Trinidad and Tobago – Jenelle Thongs; Venezuela – Valentina Sánchez	

==== Final result ====
The winner of Supra Influencer will automatically advance to the Top 24 semifinalists of Miss Supranational 2021.

Results	Country	Ref.
Winner	Kenya – Phidelia Mutunga	
Top 3	China – Alice Li; Iceland – Dísa Dungal	
Top 10	England – Sophie Marie Dunning; Germany – Denisse Nicolle Ligpitan; Ireland – Jessica Marie Hopper; Peru – Solange Hermoza Rivera; Philippines – Dindi Pajares; Trinidad and Tobago – Jenelle Thongs; Venezuela – Valentina Sánchez	

== Contestants ==
58 delegates from around the world have been selected to participate and have competed for the title of Miss Supranational 2021.

Country/Territory	Delegate	Age (Note: Ages at the time of the pageant)	Hometown	Continental Group
Albania	Ines Kasemi	24	Tirana	Europe
(The Bahamas) Bahamas	Nyisha Tilus (Note: Miss Supra Star Search 2020)	29	Nassau	Caribbean
Belgium	Louise-Marie Losfeld	18	Ostend	Europe
Bolivia	Luz Claros Gallardo	26	Cochabamba	America
Brazil	Deise Benício	30	São Gonçalo	America
Canada	Sasha Lombardi	28	Toronto	America
Chile	Macarena Gutiérrez	26	Ñuñoa	America
China	Alice Li	27	Beijing	Asia
Colombia	Valentina Aldana Dorado	21	Cali	America
Czech Republic	Angelika Kostyshynová	25	Ústí nad Labem	Europe
Dominican Republic	Eoanna Constanza Santana	25	Santo Domingo	Caribbean
Ecuador	Justeen Cruz	23	Guayaquil	America
El Salvador	Linda Sibrián	20	San Salvador	America
England	Sophie Marie Dunning (Note: 1st Runner-up Miss Supra Star Search 2020)	29	Shropshire	Europe
Finland	Vilma Halme	22	Joensuu	Europe
France	Judith Brumant-Lachoua	22	Rennes	Europe
Germany	Denisse Nicolle Ligpitan	25	Stuttgart	Europe
Ghana	Verónica Sarfo Adu Nti	26	Accra	Africa
Greece	Melina-Maria Miliou	18	Chania	Europe
Guadeloupe	Edosy Grego	26	Basse-Terre	Caribbean
Guyana	Felicia Ally	30	Parika	Caribbean
Haiti	Pascale Bélony	28	Cap-Haïtien	Caribbean
Iceland	Dísa Dungal	29	Reykjavík	Europe
India	Aavriti Choudhary	23	Jabalpur	Asia
Indonesia	Jihane Almira Chedid	21	Semarang	Asia
(Republic of Ireland) Ireland	Jessica Marie Hopper	28	Remington	Europe
Jamaica	Lawnda Shantell Jackson	29	Sherwood	Caribbean
Japan	Emiri Shimizu	29	Gunma	Asia
Kenya	Phidelia Mutunga	26	Kwale	Africa
Malta	Shailey Micallef	19	Floriana	Europe
Mexico	Palmira Ruiz	29	Oaxaca	America
Namibia	Chanique Rabe	24	Windhoek	Africa
Nepal	Shimal Kanaujiya	24	Kathmandu	Asia
Netherlands	Swelia Da Silva António	24	The Hague	Europe
Nigeria	Akeelah Sabiqoh Aminu	23	Edo	Africa
Norway	Ina Kollset	22	Østfold	Europe
Panama	Darelys Santos	27	Panama City	America
Paraguay	Paloma Del Puerto	26	Asunción	America
Peru	Solange Hermoza	26	La Libertad	America
Philippines	Dindi Pajares	28	Orani	Asia
Poland	Natalia Balicka	22	Poznań	Europe
Portugal	Nadini Machado	29	Funchal	Europe
Puerto Rico	Karla Guilfú Acevedo	23	Culebra	Caribbean
Romania	Michela Ciornea	25	Bucharest	Europe
Russia	Angelina Gorbunova	19	Moscow	Europe
Rwanda	Anitha Kate Umuratwa	21	Kigali	Africa
Sierra Leone	Ramatulai Jarata Wurie	26	Freetown	Africa
Slovakia	Kristína Viglaska	22	Bratislava	Europe
South Africa	Thato Mosehle	26	Klerksdorp	Africa
South Korea	Hyesoo Jeon	29	Seoul	Asia
South Sudan	Amelia Michael Sky	25	Juba	Africa
Spain	Dana Tomuta	22	Girona	Europe
Suriname	Farisha Tjin-Asjoe	22	Paramaribo	Caribbean
Sweden	Jacqueline Rybak	28	Stockholm	Europe
Thailand	Queenie Benjarat Akkarawanichsil Aebi	27	Phuket	Asia
Trinidad and Tobago	Jenelle Thongs	29	Morvant	Caribbean
United States	Shivali Patel	24	Raleigh	America
Venezuela	Valentina Sánchez	26	Porlamar	America

== Notes ==
=== Returns ===
Last competed in 2011:

- Bahamas

Last competed in 2015:

- Ghana

Last competed in 2016:

- Guyana

Last competed in 2017:

- Norway

Last competed in 2018:

- China
- El Salvador
- Greece
- Guadeloupe
- South Sudan
- Sweden

=== Withdrawals ===
- Costa Rica – Adis Rachell Herrera Reyes did not compete due to the COVID-19 pandemic.
- Guatemala – Mayra Jansodin Zúñiga Álvarez did not compete due to the COVID-19 pandemic.
