= Maxine Medina =

Filipina model, actress and beauty pageant winner

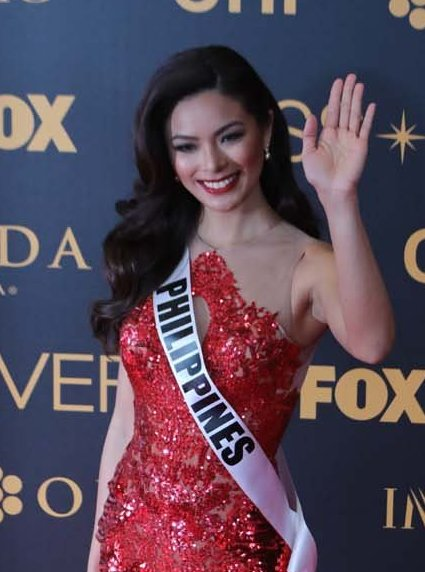
- Medina in 2017
- Born: Maria Mika Maxine Perez Medina; May 10, 1990 (age 36); Quezon City, Philippines
- Alma mater: De La Salle–College of Saint Benilde; Philippine School of Interior Design
- Spouse: Timmy Llana (m. 2023)
- Children: 1
- Beauty pageant titleholder
- Title: Miss Universe Philippines 2016
- Years active: 2014–present
- Major competitions: Binibining Pilipinas 2016; (Winner – Miss Universe Philippines 2016); (Miss Philippine Airlines); Miss Universe 2016; (Top 6)

Maria Mika Maxine Perez Medina-Llana (Tagalog: [mɐkˈsin mɛˈdina]; born May 10, 1990) is a Filipina designer, actress, model, and beauty pageant titleholder who won Miss Universe Philippines 2016. She represented the Philippines at Miss Universe 2016 and reached the Top 6. She is best known as an actress for portraying Blaire Escudero in the Philippine TV series, Magandang Dilag.

== Early life and education ==
Maria Mika Maxine Perez Medina was born on May 10, 1990 in Quezon City, Metro Manila, Philippines. She obtained a bachelor's degree in interior design from the De La Salle–College of Saint Benilde and the Philippine School of Interior Design. She works as an interior designer. She is a commercial print ad model and a senior member of Professional Models Association of the Philippines. Dianne Medina is her cousin.

== Pageantry ==
=== Binibining Pilipinas 2016 ===
Medina entered and won Binibining Pilipinas 2016 on April 17, 2016, held at the Smart Araneta Coliseum in Quezon City, She also won the Miss Philippine Airlines award.

=== Miss Universe 2016 ===
Medina represented the Philippines at the Miss Universe 2016, reaching the top six.

At the national costume competition, Medina wore a Rhett Eala creation that was inspired by the vinta, a traditional boat from Mindanao, matched with a head piece made to resemble a large piece of coral found in the country's reefs. The whole ensemble is said to have cost more than P1 million to make as it was also adorned with south sea pearls.

At the preliminary competition, Medina debuted her alta walk which involved rolling the shoulders in perfect sync with the gliding of hips. She wore a green and white striped bikini at the preliminary swimsuit competition and sashayed in a flowing green gown with a fringe skirt by Rhett Eala at the preliminary evening gown competition.

At the coronation, Medina advanced into the top 13. She wore a green and white striped bikini at the top 13 swimsuit competition which let her advance to top 9. She wore a silver-red evening gown crafted by Rhett Eala at the top nine evening gown competition and was able to advance into the top six.

== Acting career ==
In 2018, she made her television debut in Hanggang Saan as Atty. Georgette Sandiego. She later played Isay in Los Bastardos which ran from October 2018 to September 2019. She was paired with Jake Cuenca in the series.

In 2020, she transferred to both TV5 Network via Brightlight Productions's Sunday 'Kada and GMA Network for First Yaya as Lorraine.

== Filmography ==
=== Film ===
Year	Title	Role	Ref.
2014	Beauty in a Bottle	Atty. Peaches	
2017	Spirit of the Glass 2: The Haunted	Lisette	
2018	Pinay Beauty	Lovely G	
2018	Kusina Kings	Baby Girl	
2019	Hello, Love, Goodbye	Tanya Alezar	
2022	The Buy Bust Queen	Thalia Estevez	

=== Television ===
Year	Title	Role
2016–2020	ASAP	Herself / co-host / Performer
2017–2018	Hanggang Saan	Georgette Sandiego (Support Role / Protagonist)
2017	Celebrity Bluff	Herself / Guest Player
2017	The Lolas' Beautiful Show	Herself / Guest
2018	It's Showtime	Herself / Miss Q and A Guest Judge
2018	Ipaglaban Mo: Abogada	Trina Sandejas (Episode Guest / Antagonist)
2018–2019	Precious Heart Romance: Los Bastardos	Francesca Elizabeth "Isay" Navarro- Cardinal (Support Role / Protagonist)
2019	Ipaglaban Mo: Dinukot	Cecil (Episode Guest)
2020	Beauty Queens	Daisy De Veyra (Main Role / Protagonist)
2020	Bawal na Game Show	Herself / Guest
2020–2021	Sunday 'Kada	Herself / Host
2021	First Yaya	Lorraine Prado (Support Role / Antagonist / Anti-hero)
2021	Magpakailanman: Mahal Kita, Mahal Mo Siya	Anne (Episode Guest)
2021	Daddy's Gurl	Sweetik Biglangyaman (Episode Guest)
2021	Magpakailanman: A Girl Named Hipon: The Herlene Budol Story	Gellie (Episode Guest)
2021	Daig Kayo ng Lola Ko: Last People on Earth	Oscura (Episode Guest)
2021	Pepito Manaloto: Ang Unang Kwento	Jennifer Galang (Episode Guest)
2021	Regal Studio Presents: Karinderya Queens	Dayanara (Episode Guest)
2022	First Lady	Lorraine Prado-Reyes (Support Role / Protagonist)
2022	Tadhana: Tayong Dalawa	Pearl (Episode Guest / Antagonist)
2022–2023	Family Feud	Herself / Guest Player
2022	Sarap, 'Di Ba?	Herself / Guest
2023	Magandang Dilag	Blaire Escudero (Support Role / Antagonist)
2023	Regal Studio Presents: Hot Momma	Sonya (Episode Guest)
2023	TiktoClock	Herself / Guest
2023	Fast Talk with Boy Abunda	Herself / Guest
2024–2025	Lilet Matias: Attorney-at-Law	Sabrina (Guest Role / Anti-hero)
2025	Encantadia Chronicles: Sang'gre	Ornia (Guest Role / Protagonist)

== Personal life ==
Medina married Timmy Llana on October 3, 2023, in Antipolo City. They have one child.

Awards and achievements
Preceded by Pia Wurtzbach (Cagayan de Oro)	Miss Universe Philippines; 2016	Succeeded by Rachel Peters (Camarines Sur)
