= Valerie Weigmann =

Filipino actress

- Born: Valerie Clacio Weigmann; 22 November 1989 (age 36); Wiesbaden, Hesse, West Germany
- Education: Werner-von-Siemens Realschule, Wiesbaden
- Occupations: Actress; Model; Host; Beauty Queen
- Height: 1.78 m (5 ft 10 in)
- Partner: Bodie Pulido (e. 2017)
- Beauty pageant titleholder
- Title: Miss World Philippines 2014
- Years active: 2008–present
- Hair color: Dark Brown
- Eye color: Hazel
- Major competitions: Miss World Philippines 2014 (Winner); Miss World 2014 (Top 25)

Valerie Clacio Weigmann (born 22 November 1989) is a Filipino actress, fashion model and beauty pageant titleholder who was crowned Miss World Philippines 2014. She represented the Philippines at the Miss World 2014 pageant held in London, England and finished as a Top 25 semifinalist.

She first gained popularity from appearing as one of the Pinoy Big Brother: Teen Edition Plus housemates and became a household name as a co-host of the Philippines' longest-running noontime variety show, Eat Bulaga!.

== Early life and education ==
Weigmann is of Filipino, German and Danish descent born in Wiesbaden, Hesse, West Germany.

Her father was a German chef and her mother (née Clacio) is a Filipino from Albay.

Weigmann graduated at Werner-von-Siemens Realschule, Wiesbaden.

Weigmann co-owns Manila's first German-Turkish restaurant named, bamm located at The Collective, in Makati.

In May 2017, she was engaged to her businessman-lawyer boyfriend, Bodie Pulido.

== Pageantry ==
=== Miss World Philippines 2014 ===
On October 12, 2014, Weigmann joined Miss World Philippines 2014 and won succeeding Megan Young.

On October 18, 2015, Weigmann crowned Hillarie Parungao as her successor at the Miss World Philippines 2015 pageant held at the Solaire Resort & Casino in Parañaque, Philippines.

=== Miss World 2014 ===
As Miss World Philippines, Weigmann represented the Philippines at the Miss World 2014 pageant in London, United Kingdom where she finished as a Top 25 semifinalist.

== Career ==
=== Pinoy Big Brother ===
In 2008, Weigmann was chosen to be one of the housemates on the second teen edition of Pinoy Big Brother.

=== After PBB ===
After her stint in the PBB, she went on to appear on various television programs on ABS-CBN and was also tapped by several Manila-based modeling agencies for fashion assignments such as TV commercials, magazine spreads and runway.

In 2013, she was cast in the primetime series of TV5, Kidlat starring Derek Ramsay.

The following year, she was added as one of the new co-presenters of the noontime show of GMA Network, Eat Bulaga! and debuted in the "All For Juan, Juan For All segment.

== Filmography ==
=== Television ===
Year	Title	Role	Notes
2008	Pinoy Big Brother Teen Edition Plus	Herself	Housemate
2013	Kidlat	Natasha Thorp/ Enigma	Supporting Cast
2013-2014	Eat Bulaga!	Herself	Co-host
2014	Anyo Ng Pag-Ibig: Eat Bulaga Lenten Drama Special 2014	Miss Amy	Main Cast
2014	Miss World Philippines 2014	Herself	Contestant
2014	Miss World 2014	Herself	Contestant

=== Films ===
Year	Title	Role	Notes
2008	A Very Special Love	Dianne	Cameo Appearance
2013	Ang Huling Henya	Victoria	Supporting Cast

== Notes ==
Awards and achievements
Preceded by Megan Young (Olongapo)	Miss World Philippines; 2014	Succeeded by Hillarie Parungao (Nueva Vizcaya)
