= Binibining Pilipinas 2000 =

- Date: February 26, 2000
- Presenters: Dingdong Dantes; Ralion Alonso; KC Montero
- Entertainment: Robert Seña; Daisy Reyes
- Venue: Araneta Coliseum, Quezon City, Philippines
- Broadcaster: GMA Network
- Entrants: 27
- Placements: 10
- Winner: Nina Ricci Alagao; Makati
- Congeniality: Ronalynn Joy Cayobit; Tacloban
- Photogenic: Nicole Hofer; Manila

Binibining Pilipinas 2000 was the 37th edition of Binibining Pilipinas. It took place at the Smart Araneta Coliseum in Quezon City, Metro Manila, Philippines on February 26, 2000.

At the end of the event, Miriam Quiambao crowned Nina Ricci Alagao as Binibining Pilipinas Universe 2000, while Georgina Sandico crowned Joanna Maria Peñaloza as Binibining Pilipinas International 2000. Lalaine Edson was supposed to crown Katherine Annwen de Guzman as Binibining Pilipinas World 2000, but was crowned by Daisy Reyes. Cristina Tan was named First Runner-Up, while Nicole Hofer was named Second Runner-Up.

== Results ==
=== Placements ===
Color keys

- The contestant did not place.

Placement	Contestant	International placement
Binibining Pilipinas Universe 2000	Bb. #14 – Nina Ricci Alagao	Unplaced – Miss Universe 2000
Binibining Pilipinas World 2000	Bb. #18 – Katherine Annwen de Guzman	Unplaced – Miss World 2000
Binibining Pilipinas International 2000	Bb. #12 – Joanna Maria Peñaloza	Unplaced – Miss International 2000
1st runner-up	Bb. #1 – Maria Cristina Tan	
2nd runner-up	Bb. #2 – Nicole Hofer	
Top 10	Bb. #4 – Anna Liza Bernal; Bb. #6 – Jona Jarder; Bb. #15 – Maria Lourdes Mendoza; Bb. #19 – Floralice Almoro; Bb. #22 – Gemma Louise Heaton	

=== Special awards ===
Award	Contestant
Best in Swimsuit	Bb. #14 – Nina Ricci Alagao
Best in Long Gown	Bb. #27 – Anjelly Gamboa
Miss Photogenic/AGFA	Bb. #2 – Nicole Hofer
Miss Friendship	Bb. #13 – Ronalynn Joy Cayobit
Miss Talent	Bb. #14 – Nina Ricci Alagao
Miss Lux Super Rich Star of the Night	Bb. #27 – Anjelly Gamboa
Miss Creamsilk Extraordinary Hair	Bb. #21 – Princess Catalan
Miss Pond's Beautiful Skin	Bb. #12 – Joanna Maria Peñaloza
Miss Close-Up Smile	Bb. #20 – Maricar Balagtas
Miss Vaseline	Bb. #14 – Nina Ricci Alagao
Miss Internet	Bb. #2 – Nicole Hofer
Binibining Avon	Bb. #14 – Nina Ricci Alagao
Miss PAL Sunniest Personality	Bb. #14 – Nina Ricci Alagao
Miss Slimmers World	Bb. #14 – Nina Ricci Alagao
Miss Red Bull Supreme Energy	Bb. #1 – Maria Cristina Tan

== Contestants ==
27 contestants competed for the three titles.

No.	Contestant	Age	City/Province	Placement
1	Maria Cristina Tan	21	Quezon City	1st Runner-Up
2	Nicole Hofer	19	Manila	2nd Runner-Up
3	Karren Leah Perez	21	Isabela	
4	Anna Liza Bernal	19	Lipa, Batangas	Top 10
5	Donabel Marie Gallardo	21	Silang, Cavite	
6	Jona Jarder	21	Bacolod	Top 10
7	Ervie Lyn Cruz	21	Taguig	
8	Maria Kathrina Salumbides	22	Zambales	
9	Mary Jane Pahang	21	Cebu City	
10	Filipinas Gabriel	24	Malabon	
11	Danalyn Toralba	20	Laguna	
12	Joanna Maria Peñaloza	20	Mandaluyong	Binibining Pilipinas International 2000
13	Ronalynn Joy Cayobit	23	Tacloban / Muntinlupa	
14	Nina Ricci Alagao	22	Makati	Binibining Pilipinas Universe 2000
15	Maria Lourdes Mendoza	21	San Fernando, Pampanga	Top 10
16	Jamine Esperat	22	Quezon City	
17	Michelle Distrito	18	Marikina	
18	Katherine Annwen de Guzman	19	San Carlos, Pangasinan	Binibining Pilipinas World 2000
19	Floralice Almoro	23	Laguna	Top 10
20	Maricar Balagtas	17	Bulacan	
21	Princess Catalan	24	Antipolo	
22	Gemma Louise Heaton	20	Quezon City	Top 10
23	Maria Remedios Ramos	24	Pampanga	
24	Bernadette Camañag	22	Cavite City	
25	Junesse Ona	18	Balayan, Batangas	
26	Jennifer Padilla	20	Pasig	
27	Anjelly Gamboa	21	Concepcion, Tarlac	

== Notes ==
=== Post-pageant notes ===
- Nina Ricci Alagao competed at Miss Universe 2000 in Nicosia, Cyprus but was unplaced. Katherine De Guzman and Joanna Maria Peñaloza also did not place when they competed at Miss World 2000 and Miss International 2000, respectively.
- Maricar Balagtas and Gemma Louise Heaton both competed again at Binibining Pilipinas 2001. Balagtas was named 2nd Runner-Up, and was appointed to represent the Philippines at Miss Globe International 2001 in Istanbul where she was crowned Miss Globe International 2001. She competed again at Binibining Pilipinas 2004, where she was crowned Binibining Pilipinas-Universe 2004 and competed at Miss Universe 2004 in Quito, Ecuador but was unplaced.
- Anna Liza Bernal competed at Mutya ng Pilipinas 2001 in Taguig and was one of the ten semifinalists. On the other hand, Anjelly Gamboa competed at the inaugural edition of Miss Philippines Earth and was named 2nd Runner-Up.
