= Binibining Pilipinas 2001 =

- Date: March 10, 2001
- Presenters: David Bunevacz; Ruffa Gutierrez; Dingdong Dantes; China Cojuangco
- Entertainment: Janno Gibbs; A1
- Venue: Araneta Coliseum, Quezon City, Philippines
- Broadcaster: GMA Network
- Entrants: 26
- Placements: 10
- Winner: Zorayda Ruth Andam; Baguio
- Congeniality: Andrea Angela Silverio; Mandaluyong
- Photogenic: Jeanie Andersen; Baguio

Binibining Pilipinas 2001 was the 38th edition of Binibining Pilipinas. It took place at the Smart Araneta Coliseum in Quezon City, Metro Manila, Philippines on March 10, 2001. It was supposedly scheduled on February 24, 2001, but it was moved to a later date.

At the end of the event, Nina Ricci Alagao crowned Zorayda Ruth Andam as Binibining Pilipinas Universe 2001. Katherine de Guzman crowned Gilrhea Quinzon as Binibining Pilipinas World 2001, while Joanna Maria Peñaloza crowned Maricarl Tolosa as Binibining Pilipinas International 2001. Michelle Reyes was named First Runner-Up, while Maricar Balagtas was named Second Runner-Up.

Later that year, Michelle Reyes was appointed as Binibining Pilipinas Tourism International 2001, while Maricar Balagtas was appointed as Binibining Pilipinas Globe International 2001. Both went on to win their respective pageants.

== Results ==
Color keys

- The contestant won an international pageant.
- The contestant did not place.

Placement	Contestant	International placement
Binibining Pilipinas Universe 2001	Bb. #7 – Zorayda Ruth Andam	Unplaced – Miss Universe 2001
Binibining Pilipinas World 2001	Bb. #21 – Gilrhea Quinzon	Unplaced – Miss World 2001
Binibining Pilipinas International 2001	Bb. #12 – Maricarl Tolosa	Unplaced – Miss International 2001
1st runner-up	Bb. #8 – Michelle Reyes Appointed as Bb. Pilipinas-Tourism International 2001	Winner – Miss Tourism International 2001
2nd runner-up	Bb. #10 – Maricar Balagtas Appointed as Bb. Pilipinas-Globe International 2001	Winner – Miss Globe International 2001
Top 10	Bb. #4 – Andrea Angela Silverio; Bb. #15 – Jeanie Andersen; Bb. #19 – Sheryl Lou Franco; Bb. #22 – Aline Ramirez; Bb. #26 – Christina Gracia Fandino	

=== Special awards ===
Award	Contestant
Best in Swimsuit	Bb. #10 – Maricar Balagtas
Best in Long Gown	Bb. #9 – Angie Yambao
Miss Photogenic/AGFA	Bb. #15 – Jeanie Andersen
Miss Friendship	Bb. #4 – Andrea Angela Silverio
Miss Talent	Bb. #12 – Maricarl Tolosa
Miss Lux Super Rich Star of the Night	Bb. #7 – Zorayda Ruth Andam
Miss Creamsilk Extraordinary Hair	Bb. #5 – Jenie Manuel
Miss Pond's Beautiful Skin	Bb. #18 – Gemma Louise Heaton
Miss Close-Up Smile	Bb. #12 – Maricarl Tolosa
Miss Yehey Internet	Bb. #20 – Imee Martinez
Binibining Avon	Bb. #7 – Zorayda Ruth Andam
Miss PAL Sunniest Personality	Bb. #7 – Zorayda Ruth Andam
Miss Red Bull Supreme Energy	Bb. #22 – Aline Ramirez

== Contestants ==
26 contestants competed for the three titles.

No.	Contestant	Age	Locality
1	Precious Lara Quigaman	18	Biñan
2	Laarni Rivera	23	Quezon City
3	Joan Marie Dimaliuat	20	Baguio
4	Andrea Angela Silverio	18	Mandaluyong
5	Jenie Santos Manuel	18	Floridablanca
6	Rosario Torneo	20	Malabon
7	Zorayda Ruth Andam	24	Baguio
8	Michelle Reyes	23	Daet
9	Angie Yambao	25	Olongapo
10	Maricar Balagtas	18	Bulacan
11	Sasha Cruzette Benito	20	Legazpi
12	Maricarl Tolosa	22	Marikina
13	Romina Mae Calizo	23	Davao City
14	Darlene Pilar	21	Sarangani
15	Jeanie Andersen	18	Baguio
16	Hergielyn Dimagiba	20	Caloocan
17	Christine Recio	22	Caloocan
18	Gemma Louise Heaton	21	Quezon City
19	Sheryl Lou Franco	18	La Union
20	Imee Su Martinez	23	Dipolog
21	Gilrhea Quinzon	19	San Fernando
22	Aline Lerio Ramirez	23	Cebu City
23	Ella Fides Navarro	22	Bacolod
24	Jeremie Antiporda	24	Parañaque
25	Cherry Marie Tavera	24	Taguig
26	Christina Gracia Fandino	22	Cainta

== Notes ==
=== Post-pageant notes ===
- Zorayda Ruth Andam competed at Miss Universe 2001 in Bayamón, Puerto Rico, but was unplaced. She was the 1st Runner-Up in the Best in National Costume Award. She also competed at the Miss Tourism World 2001 pageant in Medellin, Colombia.
- Gilrhea Quinzon competed at Miss World 2001 in Sun City, South Africa but was unplaced. Maricarl Tolosa competed at Miss International 2001 in Tokyo, Japan, and was also unplaced.
- Michelle Reyes competed at Miss Tourism International 2001 and won Miss Tourism International 2001. In 2002, she competed at Miss Tourism World 2002 in Ankara, Turkey and won.
- Maricar Balagtas competed at Miss Globe International 2001 in Istanbul, Turkey and won Miss Globe International 2001. She also won the Best National Costume Award. She later joined at Binibining Pilipinas 2004 and was crowned as Binibining Pilipinas Universe 2004. She competed at Miss Universe 2004 in Quito, Ecuador but was unplaced.
- Precious Lara Quigaman competed at Binibining Pilipinas 2005 and was crowned as Binibining Pilipinas International 2005. She then competed at Miss International 2005 in Tokyo, Japan and won.
