= List of Ang Lihim ni Annasandra episodes =

Ang Lihim ni Annasandra is a 2014 Philippine television drama fantasy series broadcast by GMA Network. It premiered on the network's Afternoon Prime line up from October 6, 2014 to February 6, 2015.

Mega Manila ratings are provided by AGB Nielsen Philippines.

== Series overview ==
Month	Episodes	Monthly Averages
Month	Episodes	Mega Manila
October 2014	20	13.0%
November 2014	20	12.5%
December 2014	23	12.7%
January 2015	20	12.9%
February 2015	5	15.4%
Total	88	13.3%

== Episodes ==
=== October 2014 ===
Episode		Original air date	Social Media Hashtag	AGB Nielsen Mega Manila Households in Television Homes			Ref.
Episode		Original air date	Social Media Hashtag	Rating	Timeslot Rank	Daytime Rank	Ref.
1	Pilot	October 6, 2014	#AngLihimNiAnnasandra	14.3%	#1	#5	
2	Umpisa ng Sumpa	October 7, 2014	#ALNAUmpisaNgSumpa	14.0%	#1	#6	
3	Ganti ni Esmeralda	October 8, 2014	#ALNAGantiNiEsmeralda	14.0%	#1	#5	
4	Dalaga na si Annasandra	October 9, 2014	#ALNADalagaNaSiAnnasandra	14.2%	#1	#5	
5	Nanganganib si Annasandra	October 10, 2014	#ALNANanganganibSiAnnasandra	15.8%	#1	#4	
6	Love at First Sight	October 13, 2014	#ALNALoveAtFirstSight	16.1%	#1	#4	
7	Together Again	October 14, 2014	#ALNATogetherAgain	13.5%	#1	#6	
8	Lorraine, the Kontrabida	October 15, 2014	#ALNALorraineTheKontrabida	12.1%	#1	#6	
9	Ligaw Tingin	October 16, 2014	#ALNALigawTingin	10.3%	#1	#10	
10	William vs. Enrico	October 17, 2014	#ALNAWilliamVsEnrico	11.9%	#1	#8	
11	Bawal Ma-inlove	October 20, 2014	#ALNABawalMaInLove	11.5%	#1	#9	
12	Jelly si Lorraine	October 21, 2014	#ALNAJellySiLorraine	12.4%	#1	#9	
13	Elevator	October 22, 2014	#ALNAElevator	14.8%	#1	#5	
14	Awok	October 23, 2014	#ALNAAwok	12.9%	#1	#8	
15	Date Tayo	October 24, 2014	#ALNADateTayo	12.4%	#1	#7	
16	Nagkakainlaban na	October 27, 2014	#ALNANagkakainlabanNa	11.6%	#1	#6	
17	First Date	October 28, 2014	#ALNAFirstDate	11.0%	#1	#7	
18	Away Mag-ina	October 29, 2014	#ALNAAwayMagIna	13.5%	#1	#5	
19	Goodbye, William	October 30, 2014	#ALNAGoodbyeWilliam	11.6%	#1	#7	
20	Esmeralda is Back	October 31, 2014	#ALNAEsmeraldaIsBack	12.2%	#1	#8	

=== November 2014 ===
Episode		Original air date	Social Media Hashtag	AGB Nielsen Mega Manila Households in Television Homes			Ref.
Episode		Original air date	Social Media Hashtag	Rating	Timeslot Rank	Daytime Rank	Ref.
21	True Love's Kiss	November 3, 2014	#ALNATrueLovesKiss	11.5%	#1	#6	
22	Ang Paghihiganti	November 4, 2014	#ALNAAngPaghihiganti	11.8%	#1	#5	
23	Delikado ka, Annasandra	November 5, 2014	#ALNADelikadoKaAnnasandra	13.2%	#1	#4	
24	Ano ang plano mo, Esmeralda?	November 6, 2014	#ALNAAnoAngPlanoMoEsmeralda	11.2%	#1	#6	
25	Kontrabidang Esmeralda at Lorraine	November 7, 2014	#ALNAKontrabidangEsmeraldaAtLorraine	12.0%	#1	#5	
26	Babaeng Isinumpa	November 10, 2014	#ALNABabaengIsinumpa	12.5%	#1	#5	
27	Wala kang takas, Annasandra!	November 11, 2014	#ALNAWalaKangTakasAnnasandra	12.7%	#1	#5	
28	Suntukang Umaatikabo	November 12, 2014	#ALNASuntukangUmaatikabo	12.4%	#1	#7	
29	Pahamak si Esmeralda	November 13, 2014	#ALNAPahamakSiEsmeralda	12.6%	#1	#5	
30	Alam na ni Enrico	November 14, 2014	#ALNAAlamNaNiEnrico	12.8%	#1	#4	
31	Panganib sa Buhay	November 17, 2014	#ALNAPanganibSaBuhay	12.4%	#1	#5	
32	Takas, Annasandra!	November 18, 2014	#ALNATakasAnnasandra	12.1%	#1	#5	
33	Sakripisyo ng Pamilya	November 19, 2014	#ALNASakripisyoNgPamilya	12.8%	#1	#4	
34	Bagong Pamilya	November 20, 2014	#ALNABagongPamilya	12.6%	#1	#4	
35	Panlilinlang ni Esmeralda	November 21, 2014	#ALNAPanlilinlangNiEsmeralda	13.1%	#1	#4	
36	Nahuli si Annasandra	November 24, 2014	#ALNANahuliSiAnnasandra	11.7%	#1	#5	
37	Makonsensya ka, Esmeralda!	November 25, 2014	#ALNAMakonsensyaKaEsmeralda	13.5%	#1	#4	
38	Damdamin ng Ina	November 26, 2014	#ALNADamdaminNgIna	12.7%	#1	#5	
39	Pangalawang Ina	November 27, 2014	#ALNAPangalawangIna	13.5%	#1	#5	
40	Pangungulila ng Ina	November 28, 2014	#ALNAPangungulilaNgIna	12.6%	#1	#6	

=== December 2014 ===
Episode		Original air date	Social Media Hashtag	AGB Nielsen Mega Manila Households in Television Homes			Ref.
Episode		Original air date	Social Media Hashtag	Rating	Timeslot Rank	Daytime Rank	Ref.
41	Pinagtagpo ng Tadhana	December 1, 2014	#ALNAPinagtagpoNgTadhana	11.1%	#1	#6	
42	Inay Esmeralda	December 2, 2014	#ALNAInayEsmeralda	12.7%	#1	#5	
43	Bagong Mag-ina	December 3, 2014	#ALNABagongMagIna	10.1%	#1	#7	
44	Nanganganib si Enrico	December 4, 2014	#ALNANanganganibSiEnrico	11.3%	#1	#6	
45	Kawawang Belinda	December 5, 2014	#ALNAKawawangBelinda	13.4%	#1	#5	
46	Hiwalay na Buhay	December 8, 2014	#ALNAHiwalayNaBuhay	16.5%	#1	#5	
47	Kapit lang, Esmeralda!	December 9, 2014	#ALNAKapitLangEsmeralda	16.6%	#1	#7	
48	Awok Enrico	December 10, 2014	#ALNAAwokEnrico	14.4%	#1	#4	
49	Sa Ngalan ng Pag-ibig	December 11, 2014	#ALNASaNgalanNgPagibig	14.1%	#1	#5	
50	Panganib sa mga Awok	December 12, 2014	#ALNAPanganibSaMgaAwok	12.6%	#1	#5	
51	Multo ng Kahapon	December 15, 2014	#ALNAMultoNgKahapon	12.9%	#1	#6	
52	Madaliin ang Kasal	December 16, 2014	#ALNAMadaliinAngKasal	13.9%	#1	#5	
53	Muling Pagkikita	December 17, 2014	#ALNAMulingPagkikita	11.6%	#1	#6	
54	Ikakasal ka na	December 18, 2014	#ALNAIkakasalKaNa	13.0%	#1	#4	
55	Sinungaling ka, Enrico	December 19, 2014	#ALNASinungalingKaEnrico	14.4%	#1	#4	
56	Ang Kasal	December 22, 2014	#AngLihimNiAnnasandra	14.0%	#1	#4	
57	Paghihiganti	December 23, 2014	#ALNAPaghihiganti	11.7%	#1	#5	
58	Paalam, Annasandra	December 24, 2014	#ALNAPaalamAnnasandra	13.2%	#2	#5	
59	Huli ka, Lorraine!	December 25, 2014	#ALNAHuliKaLorraine	11.3%	#1	#5	
60	William o Enrico?	December 26, 2014	#ALNAWilliamOEnrico	11.8%	#1	#4	
61	Ang Natuklasan ni William	December 29, 2014	#AngLihimNiAnnasandra	11.3%	#1	#5	
62	Pagtakas	December 30, 2014	#AngLihimNiAnnasandra	10.7%	#1	#6	
63	Ikinulong si Annasandra	December 31, 2014	#AngLihimNiAnnasandra	9.8%	#1	#4	

=== January 2015 ===
Episode		Original air date	Social Media Hashtag	AGB Nielsen Mega Manila Households in Television Homes			Ref.
Episode		Original air date	Social Media Hashtag	Rating	Timeslot Rank	Daytime Rank	Ref.
64	Pakiusap ni Annasandra	January 1, 2015	#AngLihimNiAnnasandra	14.5%	#1	#4	
65	Sakripisyo ni Annasandra	January 2, 2015	#AngLihimNiAnnasandra	13.9%	#1	#5	
66	Masamang Balak ni Esmeralda	January 5, 2015	#AngLihimNiAnnasandra	14.1%	#1	#4	
67	Paalam, William	January 6, 2015	#ALNAPaalamWilliam	12.7%	#1	#4	
68	Nagbabadyang Panganib	January 7, 2015	#ALNANagbabadyangPanganib	11.4%	#1	#4	
69	Awok Laban sa Awok	January 8, 2015	#ALNAAwokLabanSaAwok	13.6%	#1	#4	
70	Goodbye, Mom	January 9, 2015	#ALNAGoodbyeMom	12.7%	#1	#4	
71	Para kay Inay	January 12, 2015	#ALNAParaKayInay	12.1%	#1	#4	
72	Lihim na Nabunyag	January 13, 2015	#ALNALihimNaNabunyag	12.7%	#1	#4	
73	The Annulment	January 14, 2015	#ALNATheAnnulment	13.5%	#1	#4	
74	Magaling na si Belinda	January 19, 2015	#ALNAMagalingNaSiBelinda	11.1%	#1	#8	
75	Belinda vs. Esmeralda	January 20, 2015	#ALNABelindaVsEsmeralda	12.1%	#1	#4	
76	Ina Laban sa Ina	January 21, 2015	#ALNAInaLabanSaIna	11.3%	#1	#4	
77	Desperado si Enrico	January 22, 2015	#ALNADesperadoSiEnrico	12.1%	#1	#4	
78	Esmeralda vs. Enrico	January 23, 2015	#ALNAEsmeraldaVsEnrico	13.9%	#1	#4	
79	Tunay na Pag-ibig	January 26, 2015	#ALNATunayNaPagibig	12.5%	#1	#5	
80	Annasandra vs. Lorraine	January 27, 2015	#ALNAAnnasandraVsLorraine	12.4%	#1	#4	
81	Galit ni Enrico	January 28, 2015	#ALNAGalitNiEnrico	12.9%	#1	#4	
82	Walang Bisa ang Pag-ibig	January 29, 2015	#ALNAWalangBisaAngPagibig	13.3%	#1	#4	
83	Nasaan ka, Annasandra?	January 30, 2015	#ALNANasaanKaAnnasandra	14.2%	#1	#4	

=== February 2015 ===
Episode		Original air date	Social Media Hashtag	AGB Nielsen Mega Manila Households in Television Homes			Ref.
Episode		Original air date	Social Media Hashtag	Rating	Timeslot Rank	Daytime Rank	Ref.
84	Matinding Pasabog	February 2, 2015	#ALNAMatindingPasabog	15.2%	#1	#4	
85	Mahal mo ay Awok	February 3, 2015	#ALNAMahalMoAyAwok	13.7%	#1	#4	
86	William is Torn	February 4, 2015	#ALNAWilliamIsTorn	14.7%	#1	#4	
87	Pagpapatawad	February 5, 2015	#ALNAPagpapatawad	16.1%	#1	#4	
88	Awok to Remember	February 6, 2015	#ALNAAwokToRemember	17.4%	#1	#3	

== Notes ==
a. The series was preempted on January 16 and 17 to give way for the Pastoral Visit of Pope Francis to the Philippines.
