= Wendy Valdez =

Filipina actress and beauty queen

- Born: June 2, 1982 (age 44); Navotas, Philippines
- Education: Far Eastern University, (BA)
- Occupation: Actress
- Spouse: Normann Garcia (m. 2015)
- Children: 1
- Beauty pageant titleholder
- Years active: 2006–2016
- Major competitions: Binibining Pilipinas 2005 (1st Runner-up) (Binibining Pilipinas Tourism 2005)

Wendy Valdez-Garcia (Tagalog: [ˈwɛndɪ bɐlˈdɛs]; born June 2, 1982) is a Filipina beauty queen, former Pinoy Big Brother: Season 2 contestant, and an actress.

== Biography ==
Valdez grew up in Navotas. Valdez serves as her family's breadwinner. She claims she is going to do everything she has to do to help her family out. She has already done a couple of commercials and attempted to work in Japan. Both times she went to Japan, though, she suffered from homesickness. Still, in an effort to improve her family's life, she auditioned for the popular Filipino television series Pinoy Big Brother.

In 2005, Valdez joined the Binibining Pilipinas beauty pageant and placed as Binibining Pilipinas Tourism, with Gionna Cabrera, Binibining Pilipinas Universe, Carlene Aguilar Binibining Pilipinas World, and Precious Lara Quigaman who placed as Binibining Pilipinas International.

She was one of the original housemates to enter the Big Brother house of the second season and she was most regarded as the "Bad Girl" of the house. She was also popular for having a relationship with fellow housemate Bruce Quebral. Valdez proved that being the most-hated girl does not mean people will not vote for you. Though her negative image were what people thought would hurt her chances of winning, many people claim that her placing over fellow housemate and in-house nemesis Gee-Ann was brought about by the public's interest to see a real person.

She graduated from Far Eastern University in 2007 with a degree of Bachelor of Arts in Mass Communication. In 2009, she married Bruce Quebral, only to annul four months later.

== After Pinoy Big Brother ==
Although 3rd placer, Valdez got a big break with numerous offers and contracts, especially from ABS-CBN. She had the lead role as Margarita in Margarita, a teleserye of ABS-CBN and had a relationship with Bruce Quebral.

== Filmography ==
=== Television ===
Year	Title	Role
2005	Binibining Pilipinas 2005	Contestant/1st Runner-up
2006	Pinoy Dream Academy	Contestant
2006	Kapamilya, Deal or No Deal	26K Girls
Extra Challenge Milyonaryo	Contestant	
2007	Pinoy Big Brother (season 2)	Housemate/3rd Big Placer
2007	Margarita	Margarita Trinidad/Greta Paredes
2007	Your Song Presents: One More Chance	
2008	Palos	Nicolla
2008	I Love Betty La Fea	Patricia Suarez
2009	May Bukas Pa	Judith Sandoval
2009	Precious Hearts Romances Presents: The Bud Brothers	Isabelita "Sabel" Urbano
2010	Precious Hearts Romances Presents: Love Is Only In The Movies	Queenie
2010	Kung Tayo'y Magkakalayo	Aurora
2010	Maalaala Mo Kaya: Saranggola	Merlyn
2010	Precious Hearts Romances Presents: Kristine	Alicia De Silva
2010	Kokey @ Ako	Lois Magsanoc
2010	P.O.5	Host/Performer
2011	Maalaala Mo Kaya: Kwintas	Grace
2011	Babaeng Hampaslupa	Janet
2011	Carlo J. Caparas' Bangis	Savannah Serpente
2011	Maalaala Mo Kaya: Callao Cave	Janet
2012	Wansapanataym: Si Pam Pabaya At Ang Mahiwagang Goldfish	Chita Sinukuan
2012	Walang Hanggan	Marian Jimenez / Fake Katerina Alcantara
2012	Kahit Puso'y Masugatan	Wilma
2012	Wansapanataym: Trick Or Trixie	Tricia
2013	Apoy sa Dagat	Bernadette Lamayre
2013	Maalaala Mo Kaya: Krus	Rochel
2013	Boracay Bodies	Various Roles
2013	My Little Juan	Margie
2013	I Dare You	Contestant
2014	Maalaala Mo Kaya: Santan	Aunt
2014	Maalaala Mo Kaya: Train	Lady Guard
2015	Nasaan Ka Nang Kailangan Kita	Imelda
2015	Oh My G!	Fake Anne Reyes
2015	Pinoy Big Brother: 737	Houseguest
