= Maricar =

Maricar may refer to:

- Maricar Reyes, a Filipino actress
- Maricar Balagtas, Miss Universe
- Maricar de Mesa, a Filipino actress
- M. O. Hasan Farook Maricar, a three-time Chief Minister of the Union Territory of Pondicherry
- Maricar Zamora, a Filipino politician
