= Manila Reception and Action Center =

Homeless shelter in Manila, Philippines

The Manila Reception and Action Center (RAC) is a government-run shelter for street children in Manila, Philippines. The facility is located on Arroceros Street in the central district of Ermita. In October 2014 it was the subject of news reports alleging that children were being subjected to horrendous conditions tantamount to criminal abuse. Reports focused on one particular child of unknown identity, given the name Federico, who, seven months after admission to the center was photographed lying naked on the concrete floor. The child's gravely malnourished state, with protruding ribs, the shape of his bones severely outlining his buttocks and knee caps larger than his emaciated thighs lead to wide "viral" circulation of these reports.

The center was again the subject of reports during the January 2015 visit to the Philippines by Pope Francis when it was reported that street children were being forcefully taken from the streets and housed in the center, while the government maintained it was for their protection.
