= Binibining Pilipinas 2005 =

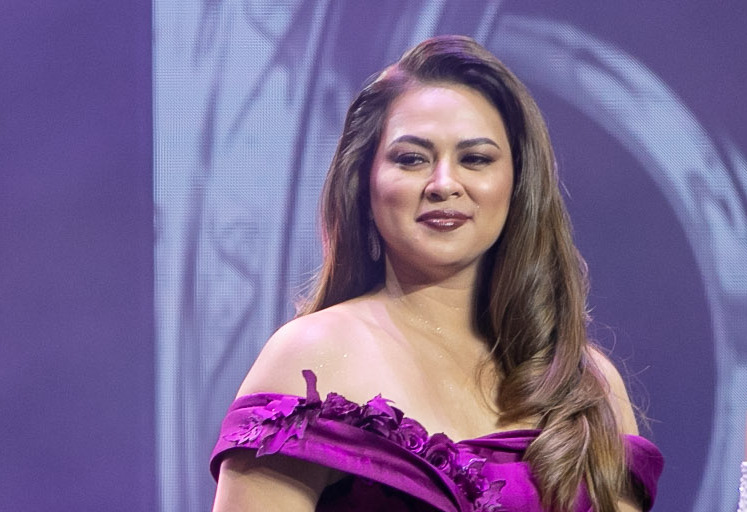
- Binibining Pilipinas International 2005, Precious Lara Quigaman
- Date: March 19, 2005
- Presenters: Paolo Bediones; Richard Gomez; Raymond Gutierrez
- Entertainment: Nyoy Volante; Jerome John Hughes
- Venue: Araneta Coliseum, Quezon City, Philippines
- Broadcaster: GMA Network
- Entrants: 23
- Placements: 11
- Winner: Gionna Cabrera; Pasig
- Congeniality: Maria Micaela Padilla; Las Piñas
- Photogenic: Gionna Cabrera; Pasig

Binibining Pilipinas 2005 was the 42nd edition of Binibining Pilipinas. It took place at the Smart Araneta Coliseum in Quezon City, Metro Manila, Philippines on March 19, 2005.

At the end of the event, Maricar Balagtas crowned Gionna Cabrera as Binibining Pilipinas-Universe 2004. Maria Karla Bautista crowned Carlene Aguilar as Bb. Pilipinas-World 2005, while Margaret-Ann Bayot crowned Precious Lara Quigaman as Binibining Pilipinas-International 2005. Wendy Valdez was named First Runner-Up and was crowned by Michelle Reyes as Binibining Pilipinas Tourism 2005, while Melanie Ediza was named Second Runner-Up.

== Results ==
Color keys

- The contestant Won in an International pageant.
- The contestant was a Semi-Finalist in an International pageant.
- The contestant did not place but won a Special Award in the pageant.

Placement	Contestant	International Placement
Binibining Pilipinas Universe 2005	Bb. #17 – Gionna Cabrera	Miss Photogenic – Miss Universe 2005
Binibining Pilipinas World 2005	Bb. #8 – Carlene Aguilar	Top 15 – Miss World 2005
Binibining Pilipinas International 2005	Bb. #22 – Precious Lara Quigaman	Winner – Miss International 2005
1st Runner-Up	Bb. #1 – Wendy Valdez (Appointed – Binibining Pilipinas Tourism 2005)	
2nd Runner-Up	Bb. #15 – Melanie Ediza	
Top 11	Bb. #3 – Ricamarie Ann Taylor; Bb. #7 – Joanna Rafbel Serrano; Bb. #12 – Marie May Rosalien Paloma; Bb. #16 – Joanne Padilla; Bb. #18 – Kristine Santiago; Bb. #19 – Mariflor Perez	

=== Special awards ===
Award	Contestant(s)
Best in Swimsuit	Bb. #17 - Gionna Cabrera
Best in Long Gown	Bb. #17 - Gionna Cabrera
Miss Photogenic	Bb. #17 - Gionna Cabrera
Miss Friendship	Bb. #21 - Maria Micaela Padilla
Miss Talent	Bb. 23 - Lois Montes
Miss Talent Runners-up	Bb. #1 - Wendy Valdez; Bb. #8 - Carlene Aguilar
Miss Philippine Airlines (PAL)	Bb. #8 - Carlene Aguilar
Binibining Avon	Bb. #8 - Carlene Aguilar
Smart Texter's Choice	Bb. #3 - Ricamarie Taylor
Manila Bulletin Reader's Choice	Bb. #3 - Ricamarie Taylor

== Contestants ==
23 contestants competed for the four titles.

No.	Contestant	Age	City/Province	Placement
1	Wendy Valdez	22	Navotas	1st Runner-Up / Binibining Pilipinas Tourism 2005
2	Ameurfina Koc	24	Valenzuela	
3	Ricamarie Ann Taylor	20	Quezon City	Top 11
4	April Jean Mañago	23	Las Piñas	
5	Allaine Christy Asuncion	23	Binangonan, Rizal	
6	Joanna Rasay Rumohr	18	Novaliches	
7	Joanna Rafbel Minerva Serrano	23	Muntinlupa	Top 11
8	Carlene Aguilar	22	Quezon City	Binibining Pilipinas World 2005
9	Mary Jane Dela Cruz	19	San Ildefonso, Bulacan	
10	Monifer Samonte	22	Guagua, Pampanga	
11	Katherine Aban	23	San Fernando, La Union	
12	Marie May Rosalien Paloma	24	Caloocan	Top 11
13	Gwennaelle Ruais	19	withdrew	
14	Aulorence Alipo-on	23	Olongapo	
15	Melanie Ediza	22	Cebu	2nd Runner-Up
16	Joanne Padilla	22	San Miguel, Bulacan	Top 11
17	Gionna Cabrera	22	Pasig	Binibining Pilipinas Universe 2005
18	Kristine Santiago	19	Angeles City	Top 11
19	Mari-flor Perez	23	Oriental Mindoro	Top 11
20	Stephanie Florence Magali	21	Manila	
21	Maria Micaela Isabel Padilla	21	Las Piñas	
22	Precious Lara Quigaman	22	Taguig	Binibining Pilipinas International 2005
23	Lois Montes	25	Cebu City	
24	Maricris Franco	24	Taguig	
25	Angelique Gustanski	21	withdrew	

== Notes ==
=== Post-pageant notes ===
- Gionna Cabrera competed at Miss Universe 2005 in Bangkok but was unplaced. However, Cabrera won the Miss Photogenic award and was one of the Top 5 for the Best National Costume award.
- Carlene Aguilar competed at Miss World 2005 in Sanya, China and placed in the Top 15. She competed again internationally at the Miss Internet World WWW 2006 pageant and won.
- Precious Lara Quigaman competed at Miss International 2005 in Tokyo and won.
