= Margarita (Philippine TV series) =

- Promotional logo
- Genre: Drama
- Created by: ABS-CBN Studios
- Directed by: Erick C. Salud; Trina N. Dayrit; FM Reyes
- Starring: Wendy Valdez; Diether Ocampo; Bruce Quebral
- Ending theme: "Araw-Araw Gabi-Gabi" by Wendy Valdez
- Country of origin: Philippines
- Original language: Filipino
- No. of episodes: 40

Production
- Executive producer: Rocky Ubana
- Running time: 20-30 minutes
- Production companies: Star Creatives; Dreamscape Entertainment Television

Original release
- Network: ABS-CBN
- Release: July 30 – September 21, 2007

Margarita is a 2007 Philippine television drama series broadcast by ABS-CBN. Directed by Erick C. Salud, Trina N. Dayrit and FM Reyes, it stars Wendy Valdez, Diether Ocampo and Bruce Quebral. It aired on the network's Primetime Bida line up and worldwide on TFC from July 30 to September 21, 2007, and was replaced by Mars Ravelo's Lastikman.

Margarita is a story of young woman who, in her desire to give her family the best life she can imagine, ends up working as a showgirl. She gets paid by giving entertainment and enticing the fantasies of many men. But deep inside, Margarita dreams of a better life and longs for happiness and true love.

The series is streaming online on YouTube.

== Plot ==
Margarita (Wendy Valdez) is a tough woman who, at a young age, experienced several difficulties in life. She was just a little girl when her father (Dick Israel) left their mother (Rio Locsin) for another woman (Elizabeth Oropesa). As the eldest in the family, Margarita shouldered the responsibility of being the breadwinner. She only has her childhood friend, Rodrigo (Bruce Quebral) by her side as she struggles through life's difficulties. Along the way, Margarita will meet Bernard (Diether Ocampo), a rich and influential man who will eventually fall in love with her. Margarita will later find herself torn not only between these two men, but also between her dream of happiness and her desire of revenge.

== Cast ==
=== Main cast ===
- Wendy Valdez as Margarita Trinidad - a loving daughter and a kind older sister. Deeply traumatized when her father left them for another woman, she learned to be strong and planned to take revenge against everyone who caused her so much pain and suffering. Margarita will end up working as a showgirl just to provide for her family.
- Bruce Quebral as Rodrigo Toledo - the childhood friend of Margarita. While growing up, Rodrigo will develop a special attraction toward Margarita. Circumstances forced him to leave, but his love will bring him back to Margarita. However, after many years, Margarita has changed into a different woman.
- Diether Ocampo as Bernard Beltran - a rich and influential man who desires to change all the wrong things he witnessed while growing up in a political family. He will eventually meet Margarita and find himself deeply in love with her.
- Rio Locsin as Adora Trinidad - the mother of Margarita. When her husband left, she worked hard to raise her children on her own. Adora will get a second chance at love, but the ghost of her past will return to haunt her and her family.
- Dick Israel as Robert Trinidad - the father of Margarita. In his lust for wealth and power, he leaves his wife and children behind to be with Jessica. Just when he is enjoying the good life he dreamt of, Margarita will return to his life to make him pay for the pains he caused them.
- Elizabeth Oropesa as Jessica Beltran - the woman of wealth and power. Being the new wife of Robert and a mother of Bernard, Jessica will bring Margarita much tears and suffering.
- Keanna Reeves as Didith - the former star showgirl in the club where Margarita will end up working. Didith will become Margarita's best friend and mentor in the life of a showgirl.
- John Apacible as Gani - the Leader in Syndicate Group that recruited Margarita's brothers Robbie and Gabby to his group.
- Joseph Bitangcol as Robbie - Margarita's younger brother. Robbie will serve as Margarita's confidant amidst all the struggles. But the pain and suffering will take a toll on him and will push Robbie to take the rebel route.
- John Manalo as Gabby - Margarita's youngest brother. Gabby grew up in poverty and was a child of the street, hence, will get exposed to wrong deeds.
- Sharlene San Pedro as Gelly - Margarita's half-sister. She will serve as Jessica and Robert's lone source of joy.

=== Supporting cast ===
- Nonie Buencamino as Gary - As the series progressed, he turned out to be Margarita's true father.
- Efren Reyes Jr. as Carding - A policeman, father of Rodrigo. He will help Margarita's brothers out of trouble during Margarita's stay in Japan
- Dexter Doria as Magda - Margarita's aunt; Gary's sister. After Gary's death, she will be the only family, Margarita, Robbie, and Gaby has. She will deprive the brothers of their sister and her monthly allotment as a singer in Japan.
- Say Alonzo as Leslie
- Desiree del Valle as Duday
- Andrea Del Rosario as Amanda
- Al Tantay as Ramon
- Emilio Garcia as Morales
- AJ Dee as Jake
- Raphael Martinez as Junjun
- Billy Velasco as NBI Agent
- Mark Joshua Sarayot as Young Robbie
- Joshua Dionisio as Young Bernard
- Jiro Manio as Young Rodrigo
- Alexis Ramos as Young Margarita

== Credits ==
- Directed By: Erick C. Salud, Trina N. Dayirt and FM Reyes
- Executive In Charge Of Production: Malou N. Santos, Roldeo T. Endrinal and Julie Anne R. Benitez
- Executive Producer: Rocky Ubana
- Production management: Malou N. Santos

== Trivia ==
- ABS-CBN stated that “Margarita is not an adaptation,” assured ABS-CBN executive, Deo Endrinal. “It’s an original story. Nagkataon lang na Wendy’s role is that of a burlesque queen.”
- In the said teaser, showing Wendy in a bikini dancing beside a pole, is apparently the "sexiest" that show would go, said the creators. Viewers will get to see more of Margarita's challenges in life, like becoming the breadwinner in the family since her father left when she was just a little girl.
- Valdez stated that some of the plot in the story is about her true life but not all of it.
- Margarita premiered last July 31, 2007, in selected provincial TV stations. Delayed telecast in selected ABS-CBN Regional stations due to local version of TV Patrol in same time slot instead on July 30 which premiered in selected key cities.

== See also ==
- List of programs broadcast by ABS-CBN
- List of ABS-CBN Studios original drama series
