= Precious Lara Quigaman =

Filipina beauty pageant titleholder

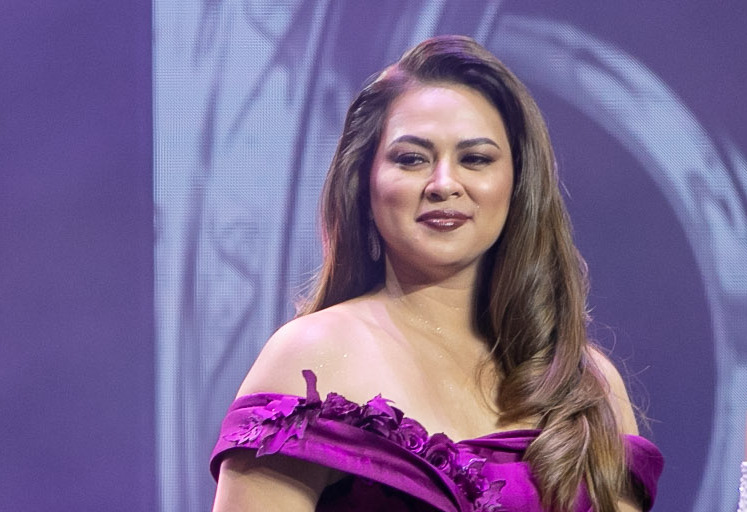
- Quigaman in 2022
- Born: Precious Lara San Agustin Quigaman; January 3, 1983 (age 43)
- Education: South Gloucestershire and Stroud College
- Height: 166 cm (5 ft 5 in)
- Spouse: Marco Alcaraz (m. 2012)
- Children: 3
- Beauty pageant titleholder
- Title: Binibining Pilipinas International 2005; Miss International 2005
- Years active: 2005–present
- Major competitions: Binibining Pilipinas 2001 (unplaced); Binibining Pilipinas 2005 (winner – Binibining Pilipinas International 2005); Miss International 2005 (winner)

Precious Lara San Agustin Quigaman-Alcaraz, (Tagalog pronunciation: [kiˈgɐmɐn ɐlkɐˈɾas]; born January 3, 1983) is a Filipino beauty pageant titleholder who won Miss International 2005, in Tokyo, Japan. She was the fourth Filipina to win the Miss International title, after Melanie Marquez in 1979 and before Bea Santiago in 2013.

== Pageantry ==
Quigaman won Miss International 2005, in Tokyo, Japan. She is the fourth Filipino to have won the pageant, after Gemma Cruz in 1964, Aurora Pijuan in 1970, and Melanie Marquez in 1979. Prior to winning Miss International, Quigaman competed in Binibining Pilipinas twice, in 2001 and 2005, where she won the title of Binibining Pilipinas International.

== Biography ==
Precious Lara San Agustin Quigaman was born on January 3, 1983, is the eldest of four children of Nelson Quigaman and Princesita San Agustin. She grew up in Biñan, Laguna, and eventually moved to Bahrain, where her father worked. After five years, she returned to Biñan and completed high school at La Consolacion College. Before moving to Bahrain, she studied for a semester at the University of Santo Tomas in Manila. In England, she attended South Gloucestershire and Stroud College, where she studied media production and communication. She later studied in Canada, where she graduated with a diploma in early childhood education in 2025.

Quigaman married Marco Alcaraz in a civil ceremony on January 1, 2011, in Vancouver, Canada, and a Christian ceremony on July 8, 2012, in Tagaytay. Since January 2025, they have been residing in Canada with their three children, where Quigaman works as a preschool teacher.

Quigaman is a born-again Christian and drew negative reactions after several of her Instagram posts were taken to oppose Pope Francis visiting the Philippines in 2015.

Awards and achievements
Preceded by (Colombia) Jeymmy Vargas	Miss International; 2005	Succeeded by (Venezuela) Daniela di Giacomo
Preceded by Margaret Bayot (Antipolo)	Binibining Pilipinas International; 2005	Succeeded by Denille Valmonte (Quezon City)
