= David Bunevacz =

American businessman, decathlete and felon

Personal information
- National team: Philippines
- Born: December 20, 1968 (age 57)
- Home town: Torrance, California, U.S
- Education: attended St. Mary’s School in Lancaster, CA and high school at Paraclete in Quartz Hill, CA
- Occupations: Businessman and former athlete

Sport
- Sport: Track and field
- Event: Decathlon
Medal record
Men's track and field
Representing the Philippines
Southeast Asian Games
Gold medal – first place	1997 Jakarta	Decathlon

David Bunevacz (born December 20, 1968) is an American businessman and former decathlete.

== Early life ==
Bunevacz is the son of Joseph Bunevacz, a second generation Hungarian American, and Filomena Ismaela, originally from the Philippines, who hails from La Union.

He grew up in Torrance, California. As a track and field teacher/instructor/coach, his father was instrumental in providing Bunevacz with the training and focus needed to compete in the grueling multi-platform decathlon.

== Athletic career ==
From 1983 to 1987, Bunevacz attended Paraclete High School in Lancaster, California. He participated in track and field events and began training for the decathlon. He still holds the school's records for high hurdles, high jump and long jump. David also won the Arco Jesse Owens National Track and Field Championship in the high jump.

In 1988, Bunevacz enrolled at University of California at Los Angeles. During his college years, he competed for the Bruins track and field team, eventually becoming team captain. He set the university record for the javelin throw. By the age of 21, he had a personal record of 7,316 points for the decathlon. In 1991, Bunevacz won the Pacific-10 Conference.

After graduation, Bunevacz was recruited by then-chairman Philip Juico of the Philippine Sports Commission to represent the Philippines in numerous international sporting events including the Southeast Asian (SEA) Games. His strongest events were the throws, in particular the javelin throw. In a class at the Rizal Memorial Stadium, he tossed a javelin from a standing start that was just a few meters short of the prevailing Philippine record.

At the 1997 SEA Games, he finished as silver medalist in decathlon. This was elevated to gold, after the original winners failed a drug test.

== Legal and criminal cases ==
Attorney James Robert Moriarty and The X-Law Group sued Bunevacz and his father Joseph Bunevacz in Los Angeles Superior Court on behalf of ticket reseller Gene Hammett and Action Seating Inc. for a sum in excess of 10 million dollars. Hammett claimed in his pleadings that David Bunevacz sold him 17,000 tickets to the 2010 Vancouver Winter Olympics that never materialized. Hammett alleged that the Bunevacz's led him to believe that the tickets were coming from several National Olympics Committees and their official ticket agents in Europe. After three years of litigation a confidential settlement was reached.

On August 23, 2016, the Los Angeles County District Attorney's Office filed a nine-count Felony Complaint against Bunevacz alleging in Counts 1 through 3 felony violations of Penal Code section 487(a) [Grand Theft], alleging in Counts 4 through 6 felony violations of Corporations Code section 25110-25540(a) [Unlawful Sale of Securities], and alleging in Counts 7 through 9 felony violations of Corporations Code section 25401-25540(b) [Fraudulent and Prohibited Securities Practices].

On March 22, 2017, Bunevacz entered a "No Contest" plea to Counts 5 and 6 of the Felony Complaint, and was therefore convicted on those counts. He was sentenced to 3 years Formal Probation, 360 days in the Los Angeles County Jail, and 300 hours of Community Service.

On April 5, 2022, Bunevacz was taken into custody pursuant to a complaint filed on March 30, 2022, that charges him with one count of wire fraud. Bunevacz allegedly provided investors with forged documents for various businesses – “CB Holding Group Corp.” and “CaesarBrutus LLC,” among others – which he claimed were involved in the sale of vape pens containing cannabis products such as CBD oil and THC. The documents included bank statements, invoices and purchase orders – to support his claims of the businesses’ success and the need for investor funds. Bunevacz pleaded guilty on July 18, 2022 to one count of securities fraud and one count of wire fraud. Both crimes carry a statutory maximum penalty of 20 years in prison. Bunevacz was sentenced on November 21, 2022 to 17 years and six months in federal prison.

== Personal life ==
"He married Filipino actress, model and author Jessica Rodriguez in October 2000. They currently reside in Los Angeles with their three children named Hayca, Grant, and Breanna Bunevacz.".
