= Maricar Balagtas =

Filipino beauty pageant contestant

- Born: Maricar Manalaysay Balagtas; 29 July 1983 (age 43); Plaridel, Bulacan, Philippines
- Education: Centro Escolar University
- Title: Binibining Pilipinas 2000 (Unplaced); Binibining Pilipinas 2001 (2nd Runner-Up); Miss Globe International 2001 (Winner); Binibining Pilipinas 2004 (Winner – Binibining Pilipinas Universe 2004); Miss Universe 2004 (Unplaced)
- Modeling information
- Height: 1.73 m (5 ft 8 in)
- Hair color: Black
- Eye color: Black

Maricar Manalaysay Balagtas (born 29 July 1983) is a Filipino model and beauty pageant titleholder who was the first Filipino delegate to win the Miss Globe International 2001, and represented the Philippines in the 2004 Miss Universe pageant.

A native of Plaridel, Bulacan, she graduated from Centro Escolar University with a major in communications.

Maricar first gained national attention upon competing in the Binibining Pilipinas Pageant three times (2000, 2001 and 2004). In her first attempt she was unplaced and on the second attempt she placed 2nd runner-up, hence, was sent to represent the country in the Miss Globe International in Istanbul, Turkey, in the same year and win. In 2004 she joined Binibining Pilipinas again and eventually won Binibining Pilipinas Universe title.

She was chosen to represent the country in the Miss Universe 2004 in Quito, Ecuador. She was unplaced in the finals.

== See also ==
- Binibining Pilipinas

Preceded by Joan Chópite	Miss Globe International; 2001	Succeeded by Jennifer Schooler
Preceded by Carla Balingit	Binibining Pilipinas Universe; 2004	Succeeded by Gionna Cabrera
