= Binibining Pilipinas 2004 =

- Date: March 6, 2004
- Presenters: Dingdong Dantes; Ariel Rivera; Miriam Quiambao
- Entertainment: Jay R; Reuben Laurente
- Venue: Araneta Coliseum, Quezon City, Philippines
- Broadcaster: GMA Network
- Entrants: 25
- Placements: 10
- Winner: Maricar Balagtas; Plaridel, Bulacan
- Congeniality: Maria Liwayway Baterna; Sagay, Negros Occidental
- Photogenic: Gemma Gatdula; Angeles City

Binibining Pilipinas 2004 was the 41st edition of Binibining Pilipinas. It took place at the Smart Araneta Coliseum in Quezon City, Metro Manila, Philippines on March 6, 2004.

At the end of the event, Carla Gay Balingit crowned Maricar Balagtas as Binibining Pilipinas-Universe 2004. Maria Rafaela Yunon crowned Maria Karla Bautista as Bb. Pilipinas-World 2004, while Jhezarie Javier crowned Margaret-Ann Bayot as Bb. Pilipinas-International 2004. Tracy Ann Javelona was named First Runner-Up and Princess Jasmine Tiongson was named 2nd Runner-Up.

== Results ==
Color keys

- The contestant was a Runner-up in an International pageant.
- The contestant was a Semi-Finalist in an International pageant.
- The contestant did not place.

Placement	Contestant	International Placement
Binibining Pilipinas Universe 2004	Bb. #19 – Maricar Balagtas	Unplaced – Miss Universe 2004
Binibining Pilipinas World 2004	Bb. #10 – Maria Karla Bautista	Top 5 – Miss World 2004
Binibining Pilipinas International 2004	Bb. #17 – Margaret-Ann Bayot	Top 15 – Miss International 2004
1st Runner-Up	Bb. #20 – Tracy Ann Javelona	
2nd Runner-Up	Bb. #1 – Princess Jasmine Tiongson	
Top 10	Bb. #3 – Maria Liwayway Baterna; Bb. #6 – Maria Cristina del Rosario; Bb. #9 – Gemma Gatdula; Bb. #14 – Honeylet Christine Gascon; Bb. #21 – Margaux Mitz Flores	

=== Special awards ===
Award	Contestant	Ref.
Best in Swimsuit	Bb. #19 - Maricar Balagtas	
Best in Evening Gown	Bb. #20 - Tracy Ann Javelona	
Miss Photogenic/AGFA	Bb. #9 - Gemma Gatdula	
Miss Friendship	Bb. #3 - Maria Liwayway Baterna	
Miss Talent	Bb. #2 - Jeanne Harn	
Miss Lux 24-Hour Beauty	Bb. #17 - Margaret-Ann Bayot	
Miss Creamsilk Beauty	Bb. #19 - Maricar Balagtas	
Miss Pond's Noticeably Beautiful Skin	Bb. #1 - Princess Jasmine Tiongson	
Miss Close-Up Smile	Bb. #20 - Tracy Ann Javelona	
Binibining Avon	Bb. #20 - Tracy Ann Javelona	
Miss Philippine Airlines	Bb. #19 - Maricar Balagtas	
Miss Red Bull Supreme Energy	Bb. #19 - Maricar Balagtas	
Miss Internet	Bb. #19 - Maricar Balagtas	
People's Choice Award	Bb. #17 - Margaret-Ann Bayot	

== Contestants ==
25 contestants competed for the three titles.

No.	Contestant	Age	City/Province	Placement
1	Princess Jasmine Jewere Tiongson	21	Baguio	2nd Runner-Up
2	Jeanne Angeles Harn	22	Rodriguez, Rizal	
3	Maria Liwayway Baterna	25	Sagay, Negros Occidental	Top 10
4	Stephanie Anne Balagtas	19	Malolos, Bulacan	
5	Sheila Margrethe Alonso	19	Tanjay, Negros Oriental	
6	Maria Cristina del Rosario	24	Nueva Ecija	Top 10
7	Natasha Catbagan	20	Nueva Ecija	
8	Anna Teresita Lopez	21	Parañaque	
9	Gemma Gatdula	22	Angeles City	Top 10
10	Maria Karla Bautista	19	Cebu City	Binibining Pilipinas World 2004
11	Aizza Francesca Briñas	19	Quezon City	
12	Caroline Lontoc	24	Makati	
13	Mary Joan de Mesa	23	Calamba, Laguna	
14	Honeylet Christine Gascon	23	Pampanga	Top 10
15	Frances Anne Meneses	23	Bulacan	
16	Mary Anne Bago	18	Mandaluyong	
17	Margaret-Ann Bayot	21	Antipolo	Binibining Pilipinas International 2004
18	Liane Mae Tablante	20	Quezon City	
19	Maricar Balagtas	21	Plaridel, Bulacan	Binibining Pilipinas Universe 2004
20	Tracy Ann Javelona	24	Bacolod	1st Runner-Up
21	Margaux Mitz Flores	22	Quezon City	Top 10
22	Kooky Ken dela Cruz	20	Pangasinan	
23	Leila Mae Cuenza	22	Bacolod	
24	Heidi Borja	19	Paombong, Bulacan	
25	Patricia Francisco	18	Parañaque	

== Notes ==
=== Post-pageant notes ===
- Maricar Balagtas competed at Miss Universe 2004 in Quito, Ecuador but was unplaced. On the other hand, Maria Karla Bautista was one of the Top 5 when she competed at Miss World 2004 in Sanya, China. Bautista was then named as the Continental Queen of Asia & Oceania.
- Margaret-Ann Bayot competed at Miss International 2004 in Beijing and was of the 15 semifinalists. After her stint in Miss International, Bayot competed at Miss Maja Mundial 2004 in Colombia and was named Virreina (1st Runner-Up)
- Sheila Margrethe Alonso competed at Miss Philippines Earth 2004 and was crowned Miss Philippines Fire 2004.
