= 2015 visit by Pope Francis to the Philippines =

2015 State Visit and Apostolic Journey of Pope Francis to the Philippines
- Official logo of the Papal Visit 2015
- Date: January 15–19, 2015
- Venue: See venues
- Location: Metro Manila; Tacloban and Palo, Leyte
- Theme: Mercy and Compassion (Filipino: Habag at Malasakit)
- Cause: Visit to the victims of Typhoon Haiyan (Yolanda)
- Organized by: Holy See; Catholic Bishops' Conference of the Philippines; Government of the Philippines
- Website: www.papalvisit.ph at the Wayback Machine (archived July 10, 2016)

Pope Francis made a pastoral and state visit to the Philippines from January 15 to 19, 2015. He was the third pontiff to visit the Philippines after Paul VI in 1970 and John Paul II in 1981 and 1995, officially the first papal visit in the 21st century and 3rd millennium after the title was originally scheduled for World Meeting of Families twelve years earlier in 2003 but postponed due to John Paul II being unable to attend because of the progression of his Parkinson's disease, and fourth papal visit to the country overall. Besides Manila, Francis visited Tacloban and Palo, Leyte, to encourage the victims of Typhoon Haiyan (Yolanda) and Typhoon Hagupit (Ruby). The Filipinos nicknamed Francis Lolo Kiko ("Grandpa Francis") as a term of endearment, which he commended. Around 6–7 million attended Francis' final Papal Mass at Luneta, surpassing the crowd at World Youth Day 1995 in the same venue and making it the largest papal crowd in history. The theme of Francis' 2015 visit was "Mercy and Compassion" (Filipino: Habag at Malasakit).

== Background ==
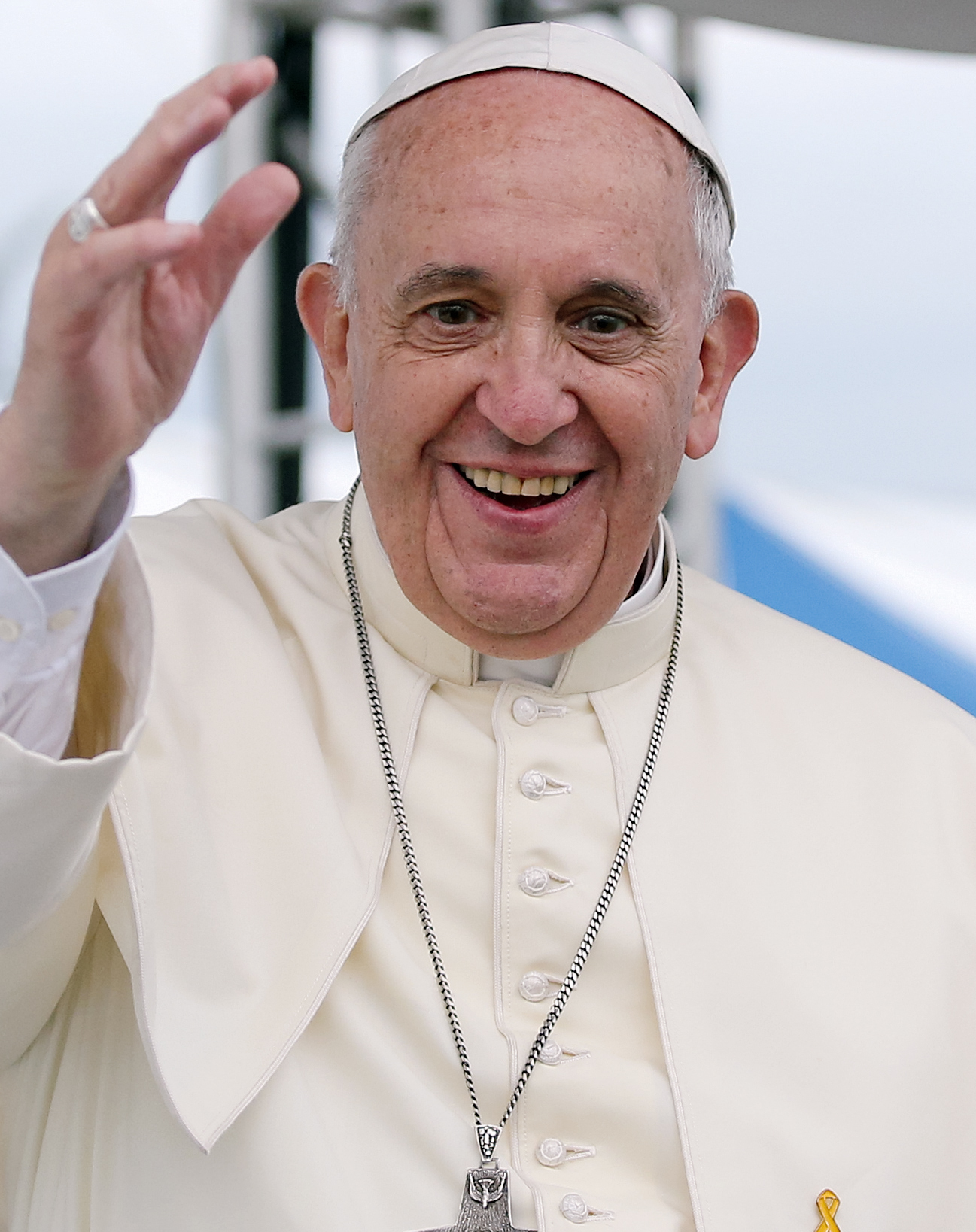
Pope Francis

=== Invitation and planning ===
Efforts to get Pope Francis to visit the Philippines began at his enthronement, when Cardinal Luis Antonio Tagle personally requested the visit.

In a pastoral letter dated July 7, 2014, the Catholic Bishops' Conference of the Philippines announced the theme of the papal visit, "A Nation of Mercy and Compassion." The theme was later shortened to "Mercy and Compassion".

== Security ==
=== Military and police mobilization ===
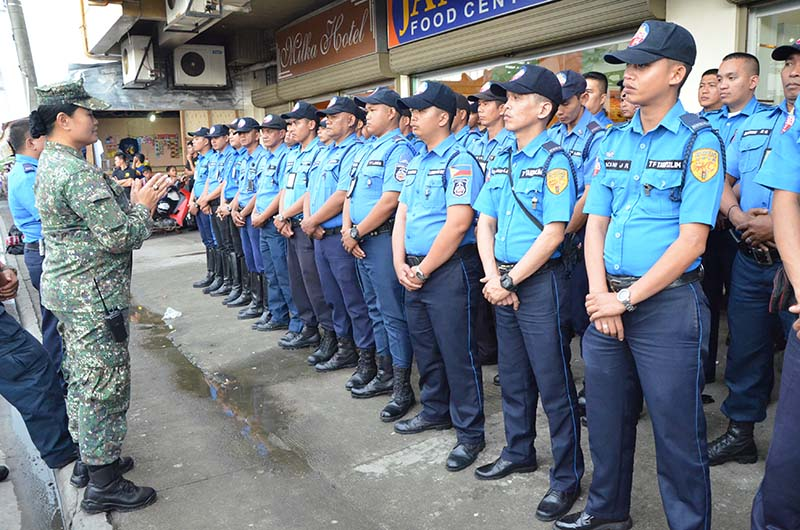
Officers from Metropolitan Manila Development Authority sent to Leyte

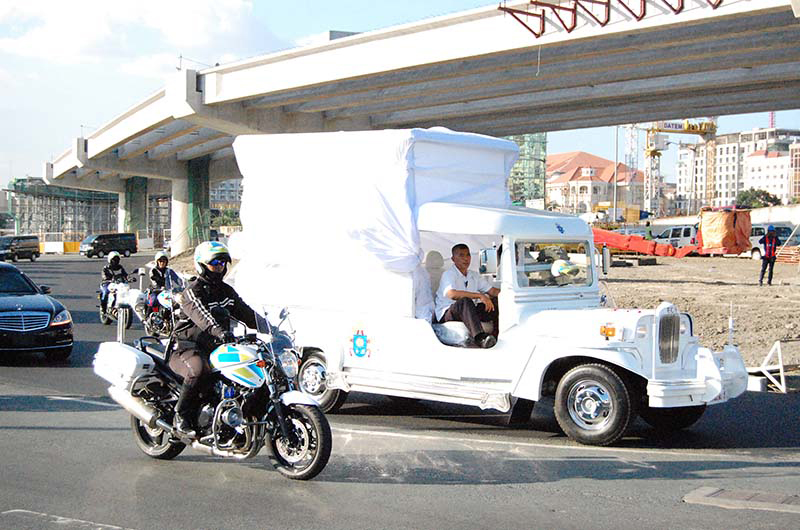
Security simulation of papal convoy on Andrews Avenue near the Villamor Air Base

Philippine authorities mobilized about 37,500 police and military personnel in Manila, Tacloban, and Palo during the visit: 7,000 from the Armed Forces plus 5,000 reservists, 25,000 police officers, and a 450-man security force recently returned from United Nations peacekeeping missions in the Golan Heights and Liberia. Snipers were also deployed in buildings along Roxas Boulevard in Manila.

=== International coordination ===
The Philippine government coordinated with Interpol and with other Southeast Asian states to monitor people who may have been on Interpol's watch list of those who went to Iraq or Syria to join the Islamic State militant group. "We're touching base with so many allies to ... identify any threat whatsoever coming from any direction," then-President Benigno Aquino III commented on the coordination efforts.

The Central Intelligence Agency of the United States and the Vatican had also sent intelligence agents to the Philippines to assess the security situation ahead of the papal visit.

=== Foiled terror plot ===
On January 22, it was revealed by Philippine authorities that weeks prior to the papal visit a plot to detonate a bomb on the papal convoy by Jemaah Islamiyah was foiled by the Philippine Armed Forces and National Police. The Swiss Guards tasked to guard the pope's personal security were also instrumental in foiling the plot. The plot was confirmed by intelligence counterparts from neighboring countries.

Additional deployment to key areas by the military was made following the foiled attack. Part of the Light Reaction Company, which received training assistance from the United States, and extra military armored assets were deployed during Pope Francis's mass at Luneta. Security forces also made changes to their preparation to mislead potential attackers. The foiled plot was also the reason for the intentional jamming of cellular signals around areas where the pope visited.

=== Crowd control ===
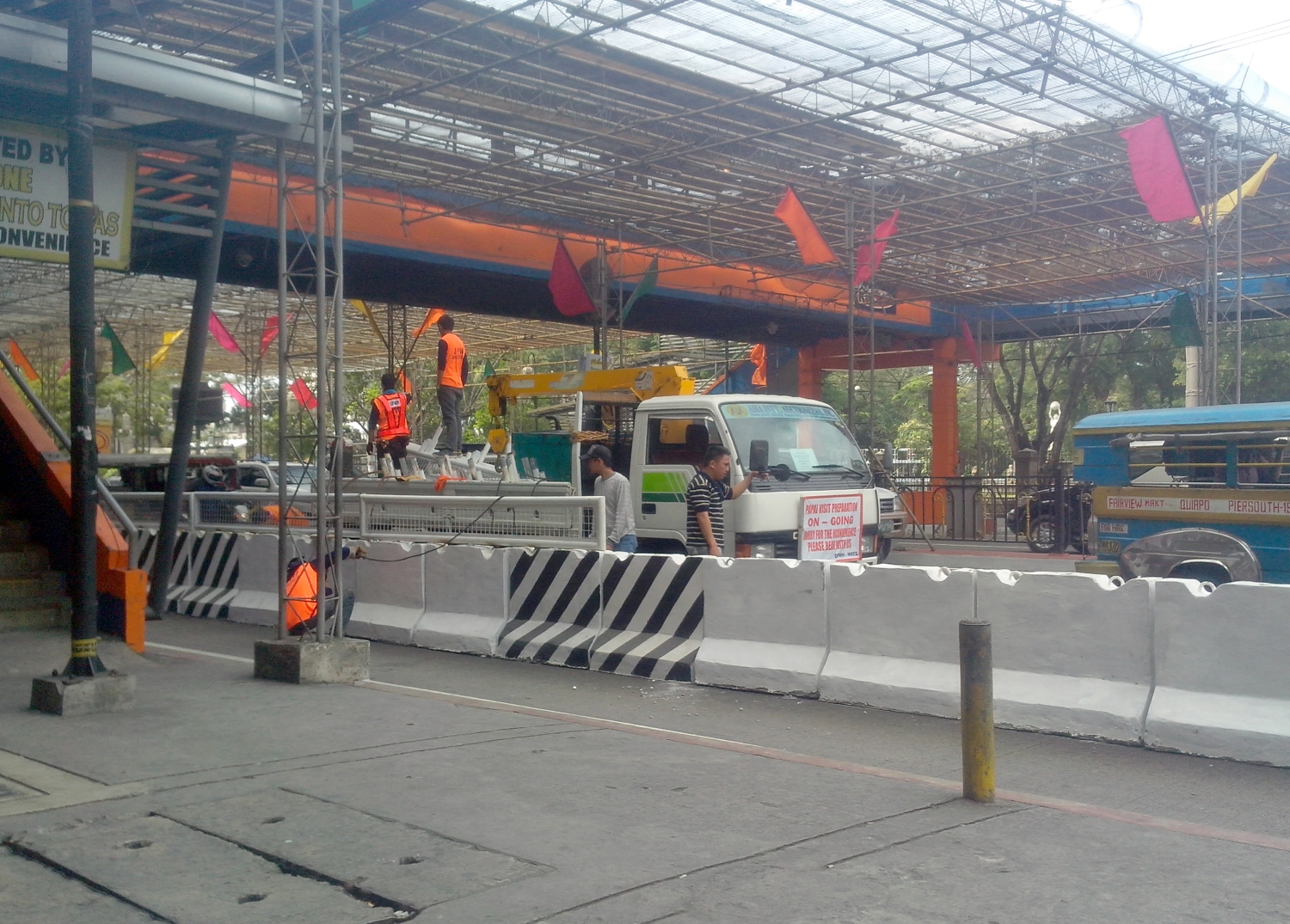
Concrete barriers installed along España Boulevard by University of Santo Tomas

The Department of Public Works and Highways utilized at least 23,000 concrete barriers along the route the pope took around Metro Manila to restrain the crowd from blocking the pope's motorcade. Each barrier measures about 1.25 meters high, some being borrowed from the North and South Luzon Expressways. During John Paul II's visit devotees had rushed into the streets slowing down or stopping the pope's motorcade, which the concrete barriers were meant to forestall.

A uniformed human barricade of 11,000 barangay officials and 5,000 parishioners from Manila secured Pope Francis, and 5,000 students from the University of Santo Tomas volunteered as a human barricade during the pope's visit to the university.

== Theme song ==
Filipina singer Jamie Rivera sang "We Are All God's Children", the official theme song for the Papal visit, with lyrics penned by Rivera herself, and music composed and arranged by Noel Espenida. The song's theme is about "humility" and "solidarity with the poor and mercy to the weak". A music video was made available on YouTube.

== Venues ==
Metro Manila

- Villamor Air Base, Pasay
- Manila Cathedral, Manila
- Mall of Asia Arena, Pasay
- University of Santo Tomas Field, Manila
- Quirino Grandstand, Manila
- Apostolic Nunciature, Manila

Leyte

- Daniel Z. Romualdez Airport, Tacloban
- Archbishop's Residence, Palo
- Pope Francis Center for the Poor, Palo
- Metropolitan Cathedral of our Lord's Transfiguration, Palo
Venues within Metro Manila

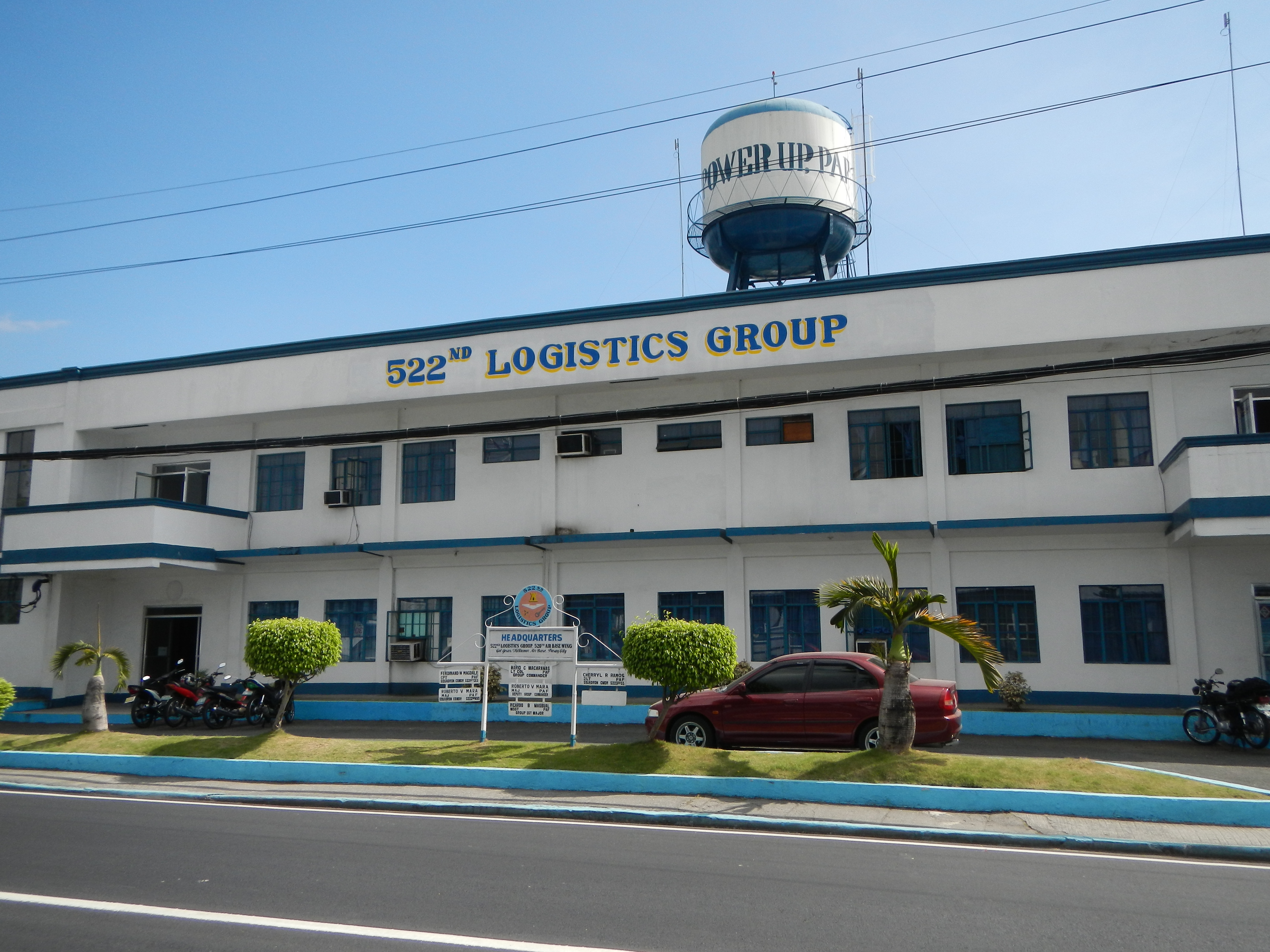
Villamor Air Base

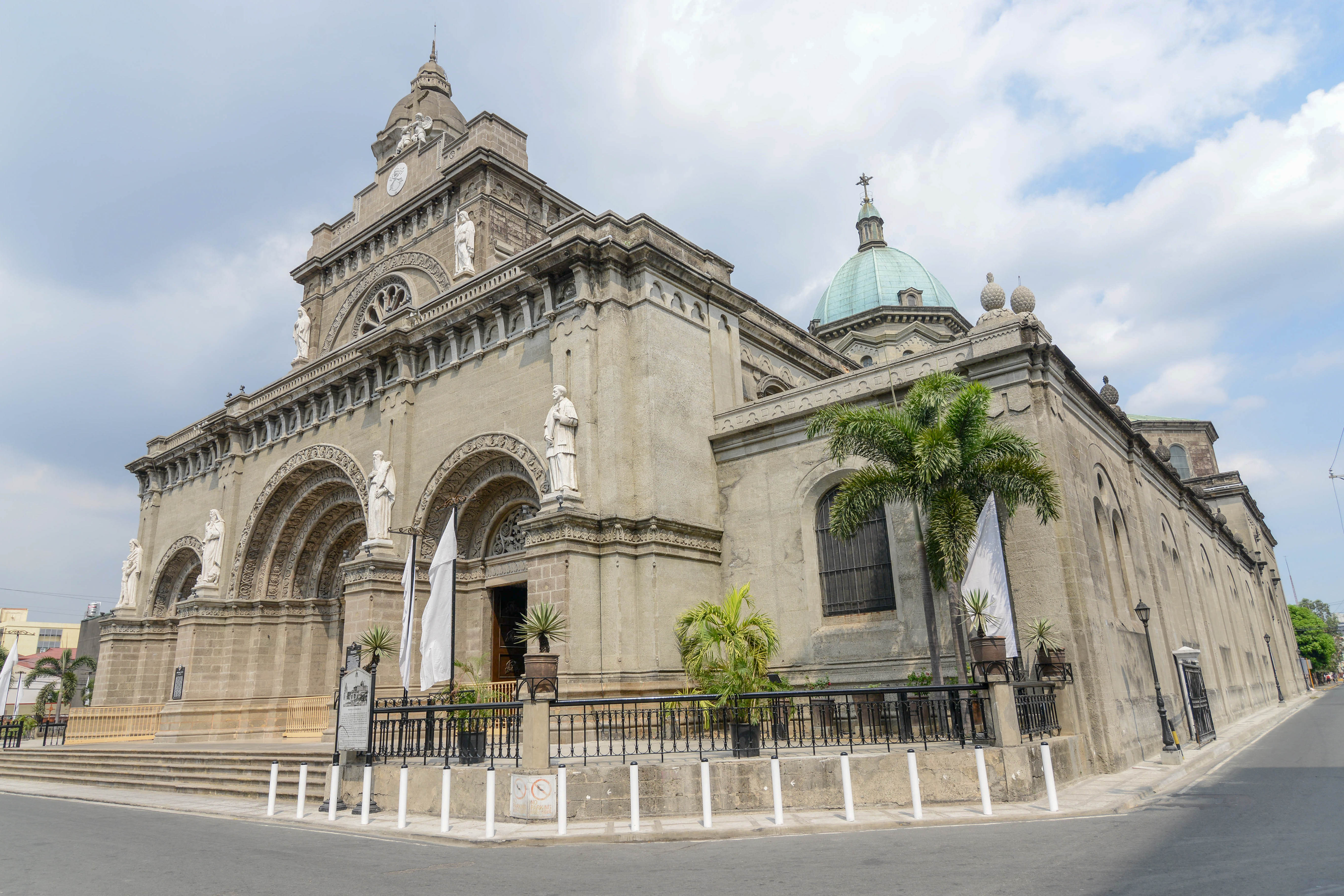
Manila Cathedral

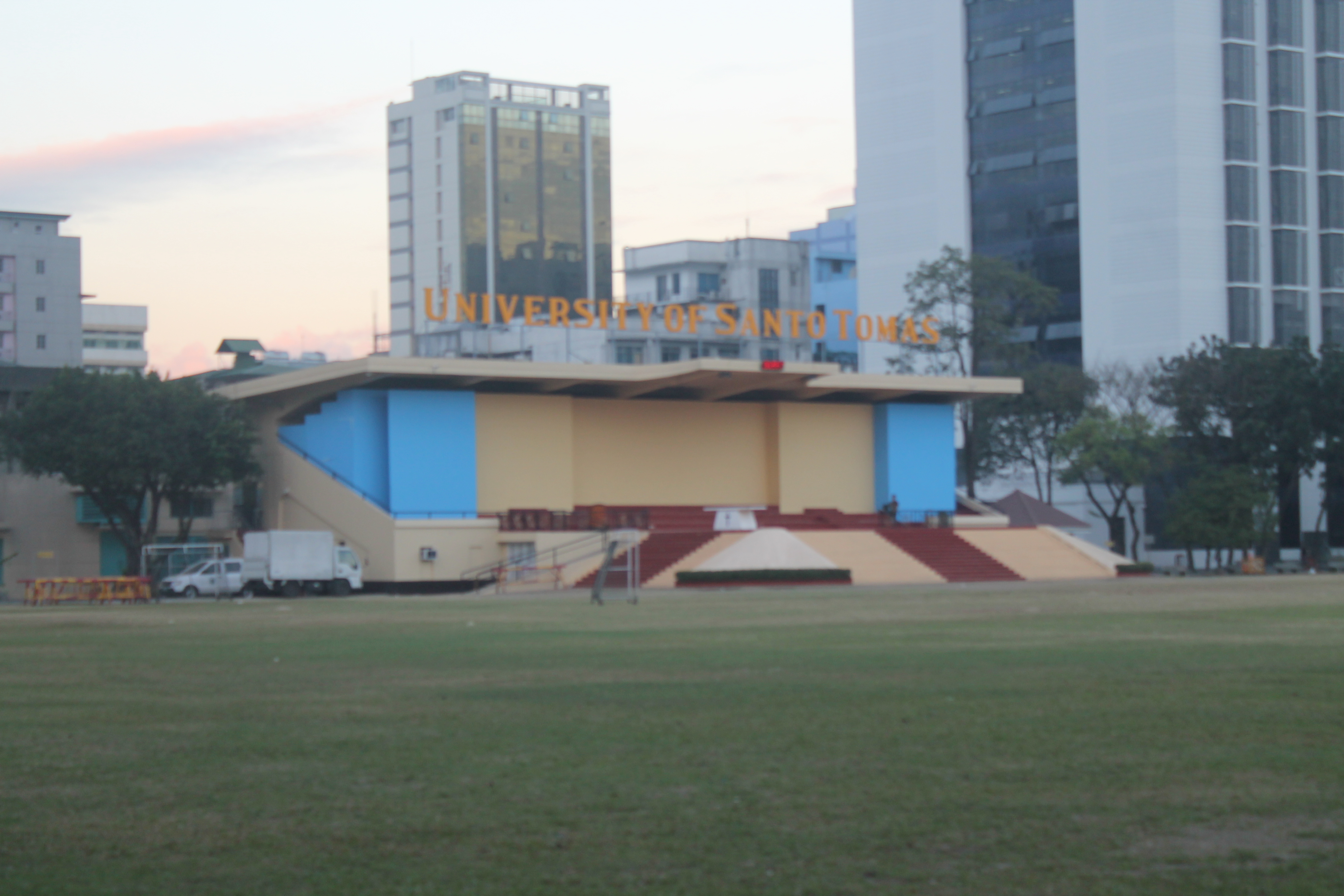
The UST Grandstand at the University of Santo Tomas Field

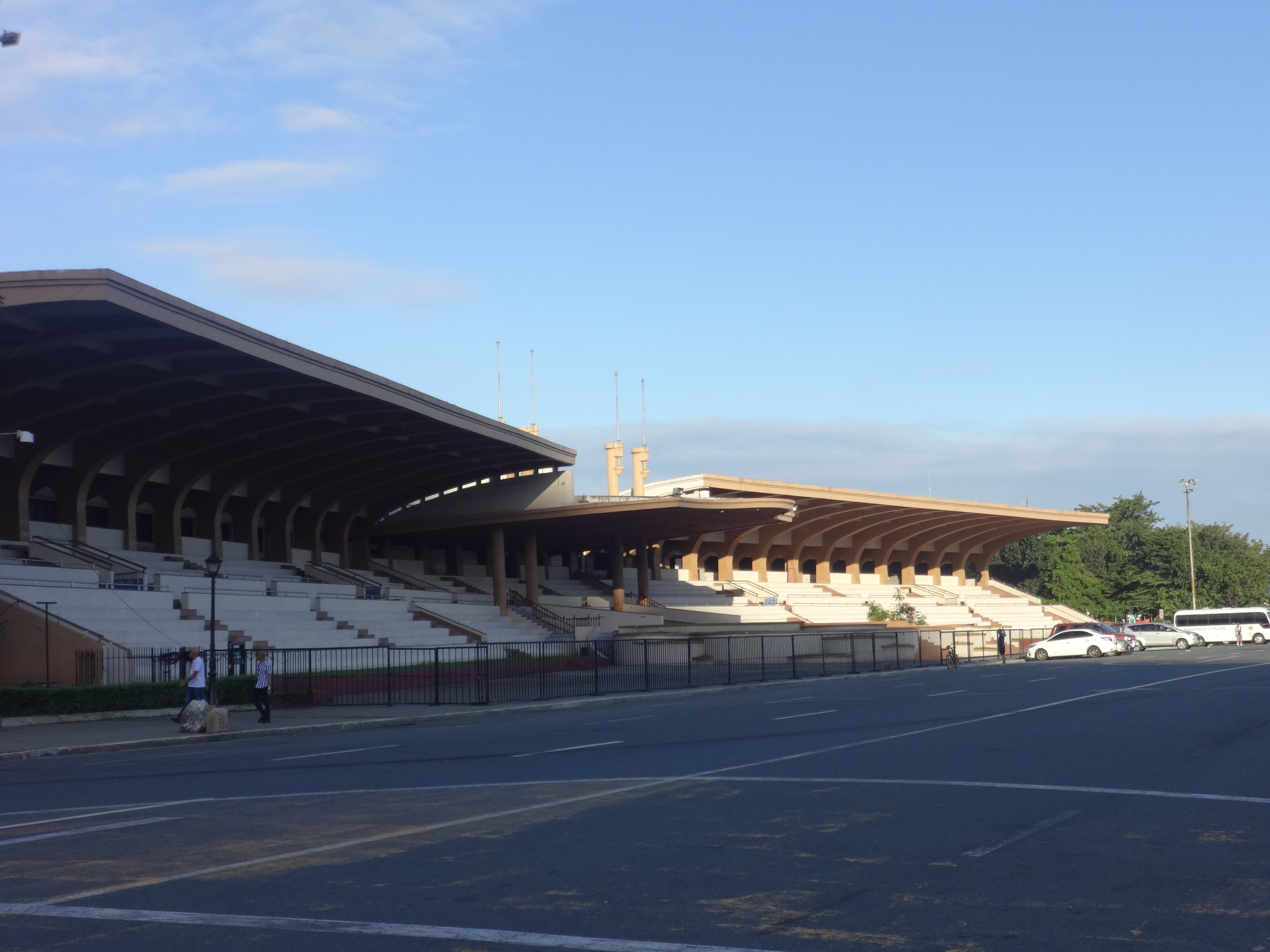
Quirino Grandstand
Venues in Leyte

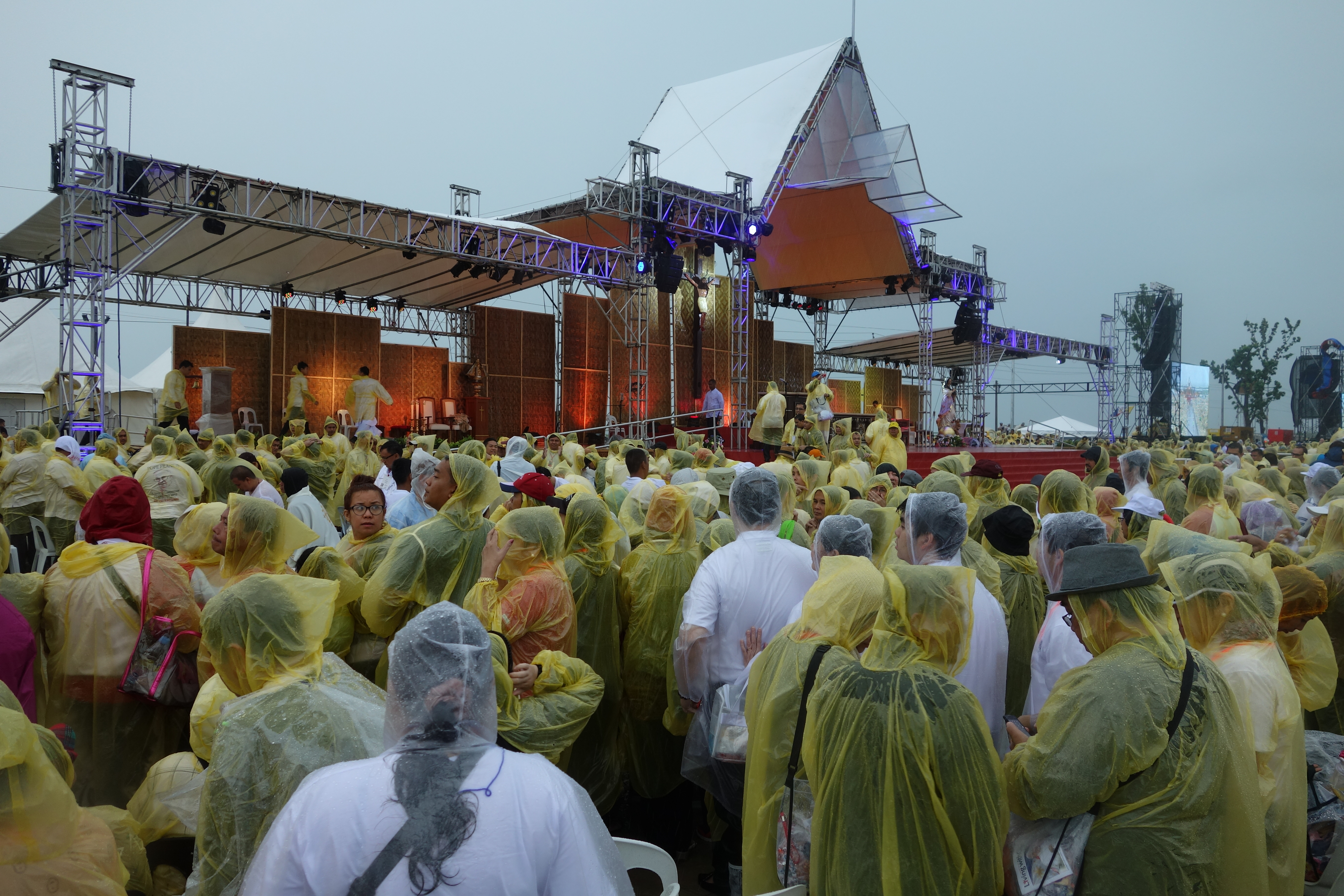
Daniel Z. Romualdez Airport

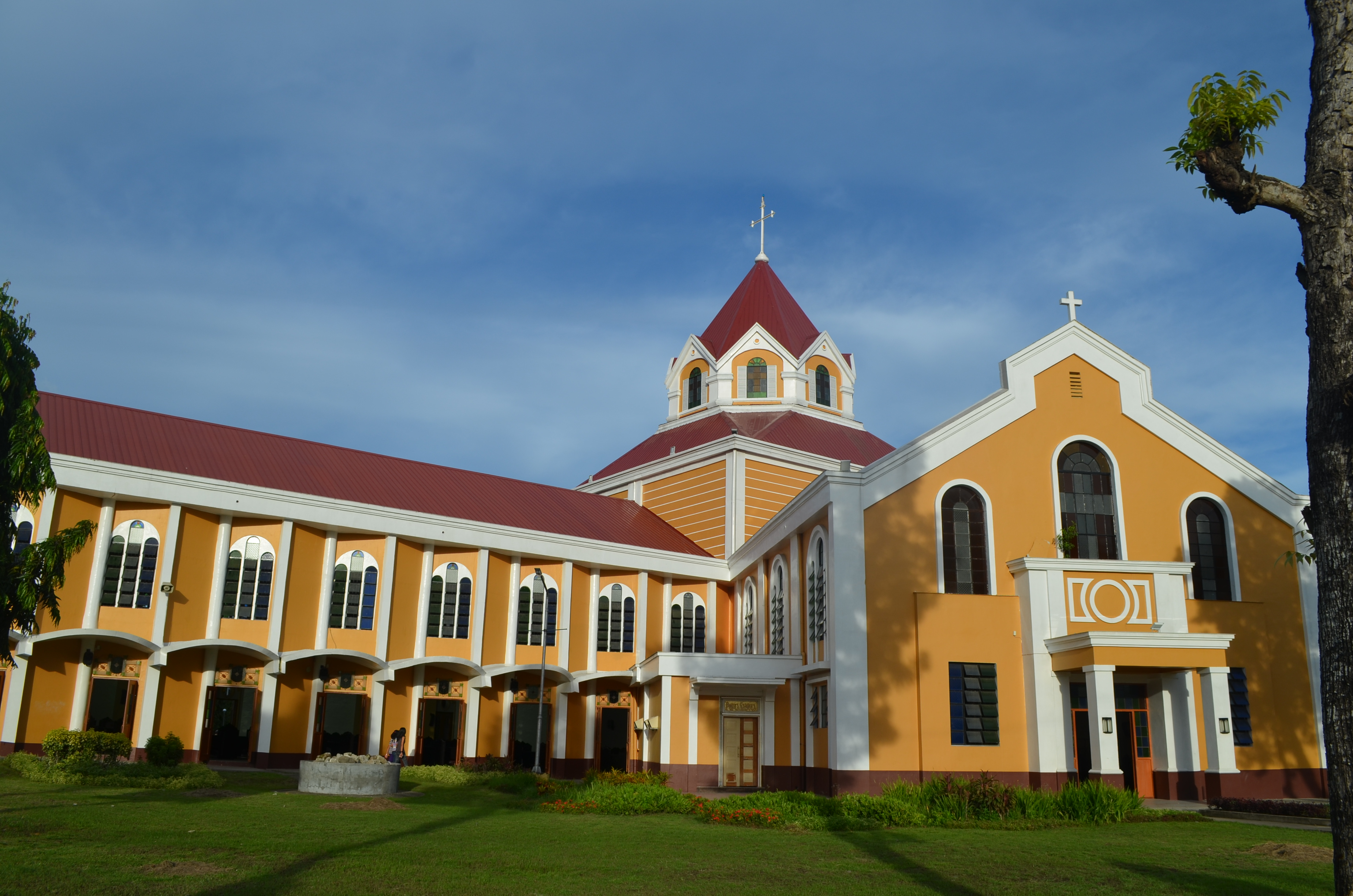
Metropolitan Cathedral of our Lord's Transfiguration, also known as the Palo Cathedral

== Visit ==
=== Day 1: January 15, Thursday ===
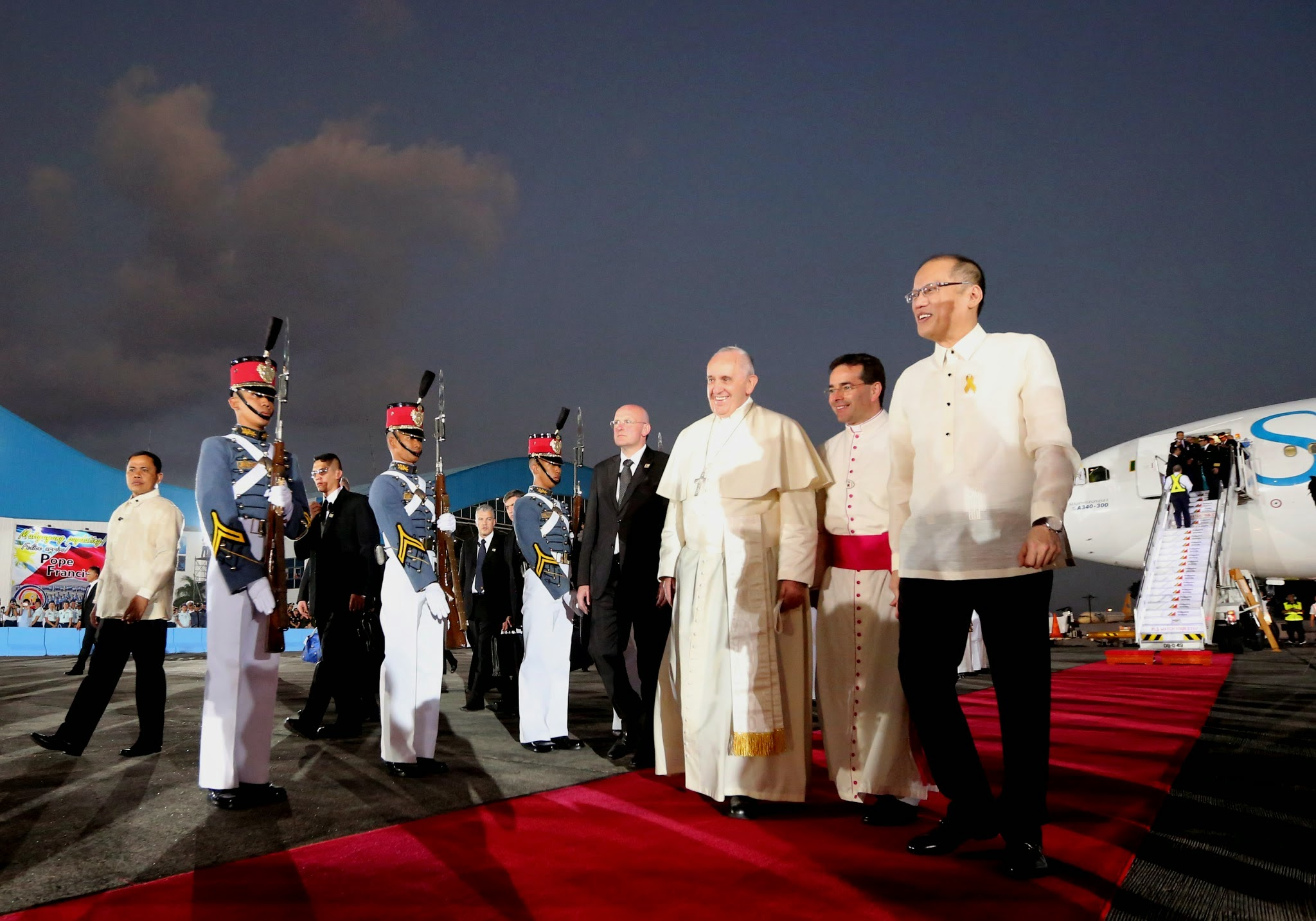
President Benigno Aquino III and Pope Francis at the arrival ceremony

Pope Francis, who came from a papal visit to Sri Lanka, arrived in Manila through Villamor Air Base riding a chartered Airbus A340-300 of SriLankan Airlines (flight UL4111, registered 4R-ADF). However, as soon as the Pope stepped out of the plane, his zucchetto was blown away due to strong winds. He was welcomed by then-President Benigno Aquino III and several other government officials and church leaders. He arrived in the country at 5:32 pm PST about 13 minutes ahead of his expected arrival time. For 15 minutes, which started at 5:30 pm PST, all Catholic churches around the country rang their bells to signal the Pope's arrival, as directed by the Bishops' Conference head Archbishop Socrates Villegas of Lingayen-Dagupan.

The pope was welcomed at the air base by 1,200 students from different Catholic schools in the Diocese of Parañaque, which covers the cities of Parañaque, Las Piñas and Muntinlupa. The students danced to the tunes Piliin Mo ang Pilipinas sung by Angeline Quinto, Kapayapaan by Tropical Depression, and Sayaw ng Pagbati. These are traditional Easter Sunday songs in Parañaque.

The delegation of religious officials and politicians welcoming the pope at the air base included:

Government officials

- President Benigno Aquino III
- Vice President Jejomar Binay
- Executive Secretary Paquito Ochoa, Jr.
- Foreign Affairs Secretary Albert del Rosario
- Finance Secretary Cesar Purisima
- Justice Secretary Leila de Lima
- Public Works Secretary Rogelio Singson
- Education Secretary Armin Luistro
- Defense Secretary Voltaire Gazmin
- Interior and Local Government Secretary Mar Roxas
- Transportation Secretary Joseph Emilio Abaya
- Budget Secretary Florencio Abad
- NEDA Director General Arsenio Balisacan

Religious officials

- Manila Archbishop and Cardinal Luis Antonio Tagle
- Cotabato Archbishop and Cardinal Orlando Quevedo
- Lingayen-Dagupan Archbishop and CBCP President Socrates B. Villegas
- Cagayan de Oro Archbishop Antonio Ledesma S.J.
- Davao Archbishop Romulo Valles
- Cabanatuan Bishop Sofronio Bancud
- La Union Bishop Rodolfo Beltran
- Malaybalay Bishop Jose Cabantan
- Prelate of Infanta Bernardino Cortez
- Daet Bishop Gilbert Garcera
- Vicar Apostolic of Jolo Angelito Lampon
- Lucena Bishop Emilio Z. Marquez
- Parañaque Bishop Jesse Mercado
- CBCP Secretary General Rev. Father Marvin Mejia

The pope then proceeded in an open-air popemobile to the Apostolic Nunciature in Manila, which served as the official residence during his stay in the country. On his way to the nunciature, the pope was welcomed by thousands of devotees and enthusiasts.

=== Day 2: January 16, Friday ===
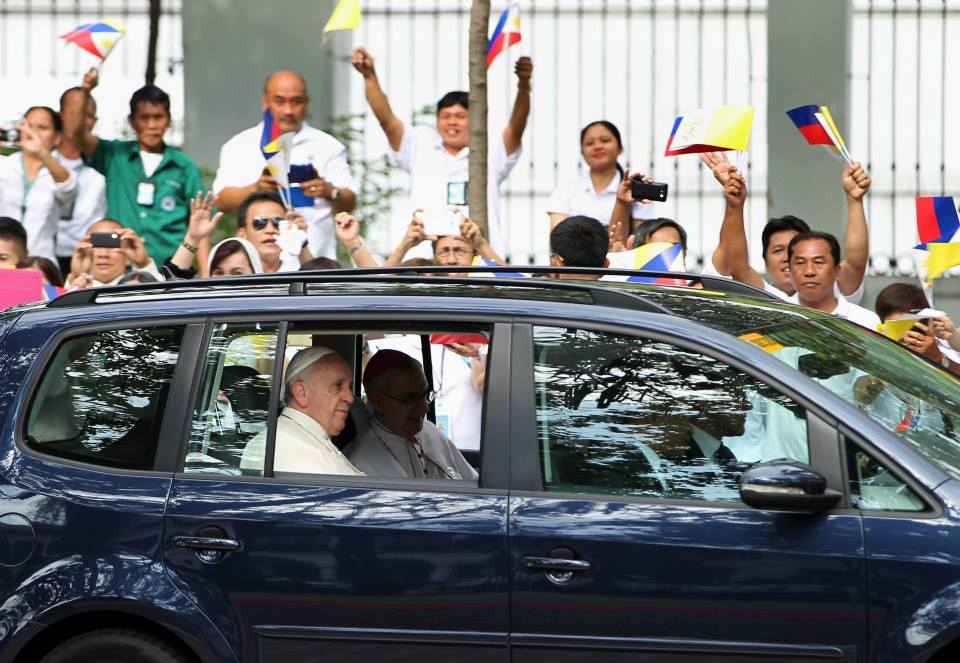
Francis' arrival at Malacañang Palace in a Volkswagen Touran

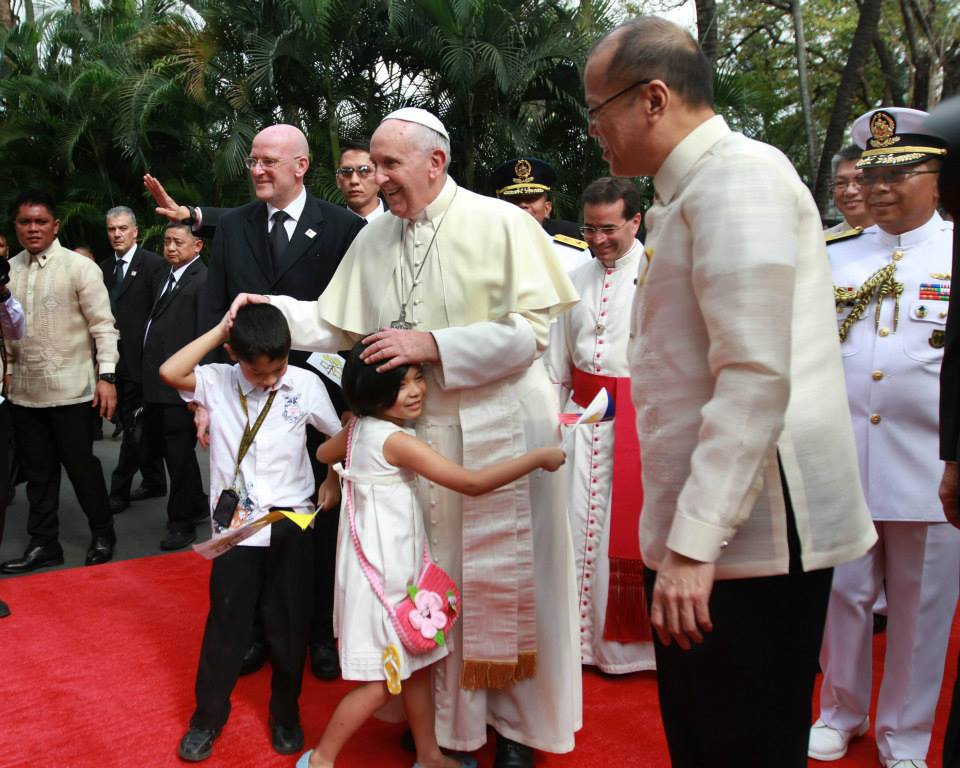
Pope Francis and President Aquino at Malacañang

The pope rode a "close and more formal" Volkswagen Touran to the Malacañang Palace, rolling down the window to wave to people waiting to have a glimpse of him. He went to Malacañang as the head of state of the Vatican and had a courtesy call with then-President Benigno Aquino III, also meeting diplomats and officials at Rizal Memorial Hall.

The then-President Aquino made a speech before those in attendance at Malacañang, in which he spoke of the role of the local Church in the recent history of the country. He acknowledged its major role in opposing former President Ferdinand Marcos and criticized undemocratic policies that led to Marcos's downfall through the 1986 People Power Revolution. However, Aquino criticized the local Church for its alleged inaction against "abuses" by "previous administrations" and for lobbying against the Reproductive Health Law even before its passage as a law. Aquino criticized the local Church for allegedly being too critical of him with some members of the local clergy "telling him to do something about balding hair". The then-president later changed his tone and praised the pope. The speech by Aquino proved controversial and drew mixed reactions online.

After Aquino's speech, Francis made his first public speech and tackled the issue of corruption in the country. He urged political leaders to be "outstanding for honesty, integrity, and commitment to the common good." He added that they must listen to the concerns of the poor and tackle the "glaring and indeed scandalous social inequalities" in society. The pope also called on Filipinos "at all levels of society to reject every form of corruption which diverts resources from the poor, and to make concerted efforts to ensure the inclusion of every man, woman, and child in the life of the community." The pope also hailed the resiliency of millions of Filipinos who were affected by Typhoon Yolanda (Haiyan). "This visit is meant to express my closeness to our brothers and sisters who endured and suffered loss and devastation caused by typhoon Yolanda," Francis said, using the local name of the typhoon. "I admire the heroic strength, faith, and resilience demonstrated by so many Filipinos in the face of natural disaster," he added.

The pope later rode the popemobile to Manila Cathedral to celebrate Mass. Before Mass, he and Cardinal Luis Antonio Tagle met privately for about fifteen minutes with street children served by the Tulay ng Kabataan Foundation. These children had sent 1,000 letters requesting the pope to meet with them in person. The Mass was closed to the public, with only 1,500 selected people in attendance – bishops, priests, nuns, and seminarians, plus 500 laypersons. In his homily, the pope highlighted the role of the Catholic Church in addressing the issues of inequality and injustice and leading the Philippine society from the "confusing presentations of sexuality, marriage, and family." The attendees led by Manila Archbishop and Cardinal Luis Tagle welcomed the pope and related the history of the cathedral, which was rebuilt numerous times after being destroyed by natural and manmade calamities, showing the resiliency of the Filipino people. Authorities estimated that about 22,000 people gathered outside the cathedral during the Mass, with 12,000 at Plaza Roma, and 10,000 in nearby streets. In an unexpected move, Pope Francis used the side doors as his exit after the Mass and walked towards Gen. Luna Street of Intramuros to visit the street children of Anak-TnK. He returned to the Apostolic Nunciature before heading towards the SM Mall of Asia Arena.

The pope then met with families at the SM Mall of Asia Arena. Each of the country's 86 dioceses were to send 100 people for the meeting. In addition, 300 people from the poor sector were selected by Caritas Manila and filled the center of the arena directly facing the pope. Francis had requested that no people be seated at his back during the meeting.

Back at the Apostolic Nunciature, Pope Francis, a Jesuit himself, accommodated 40 Filipino Jesuits. The Filipino Jesuits were privately informed of the meeting that was disclosed to the public only afterwards.

=== Day 3: January 17, Saturday ===
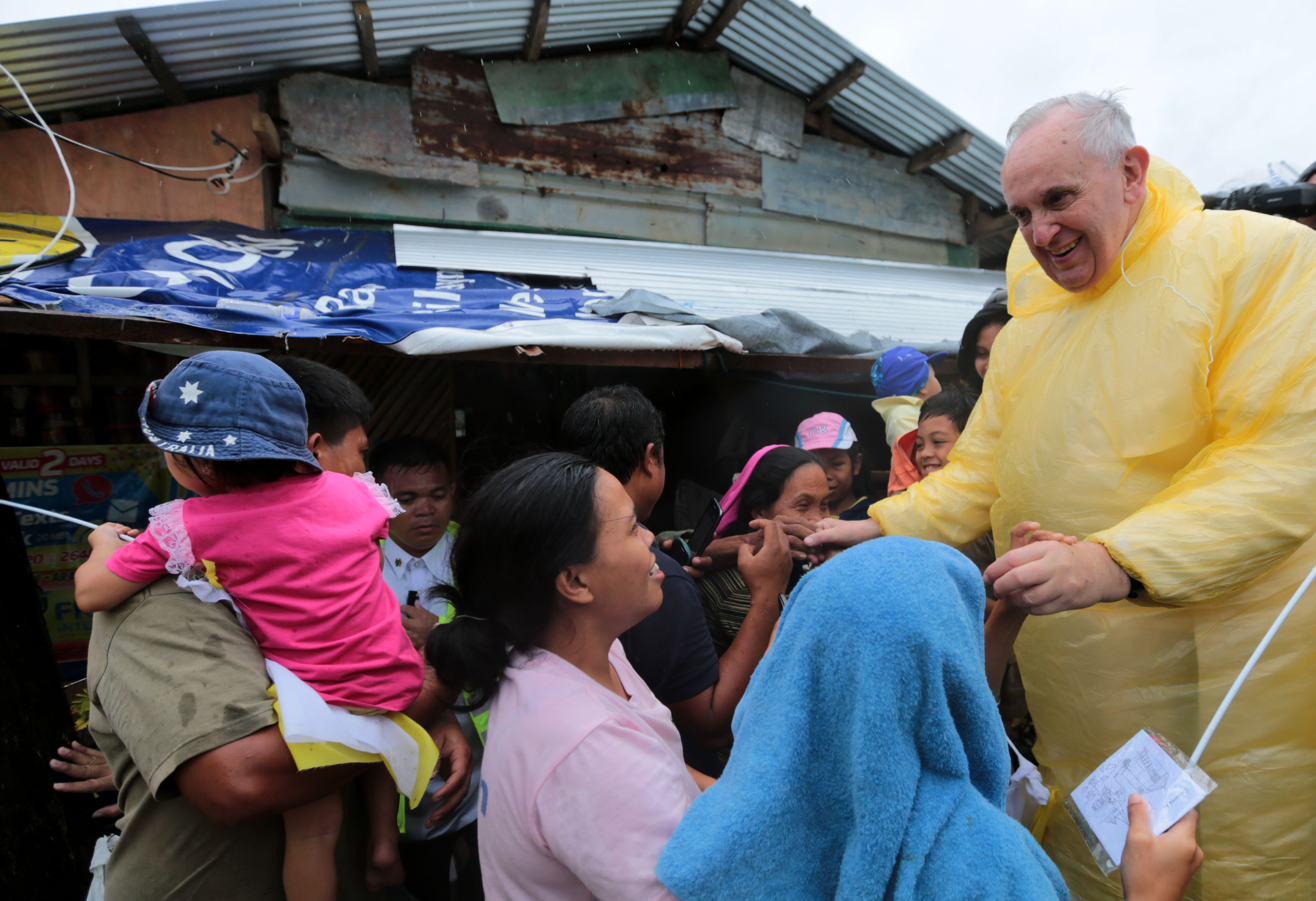
Pope Francis visits Typhoon Haiyan victims in Palo, Leyte

Pope Francis departed from Villamor Air Base at 7:37 am PST for Daniel Z. Romualdez Airport in Tacloban, Leyte, on a chartered Airbus A320 flight operated by Philippine Airlines, arriving in Tacloban at approximately 8:50 am PST, where he was welcomed by Palo Archbishop John F. Du together with local government officials Leyte Governor Leopoldo Petilla, representative from 1st district of Leyte Martin Romualdez, Tacloban City Mayor Alfred Romualdez and Palo, Leyte Mayor Remedios Petilla. The pope's trip to Leyte was shortened as decided by the Vatican due to Tropical Storm Mekkhala (Amang). Leyte had been placed under storm signal no. 2 earlier in the morning by the Philippine weather service. The pontiff led the celebration of Mass on a specially constructed stage, composed of sawali or woven bamboo mats, at the airport. Among the languages used during the Mass were Waray, Cebuano, English, Filipino, Hiligaynon, Latin, and Spanish.

At the Archbishop's Residence in Palo, Francis had lunch with survivors of Typhoon Haiyan (Yolanda) and of the earlier Bohol earthquake. He then blessed the Pope Francis Center for the Poor, a facility in Palo funded by the Pontifical Council Cor Unum. It has a clinic, chapel, home for the sick and elderly, and orphanage. Construction took five months and was completed in December 2014. The pope had a brief meeting with seminarians, priests, religious community members, and families of survivors of Typhoon Haiyan at the Palo Cathedral and blessed a mass grave of those who had died during the typhoon. He departed from Tacloban for Manila at 1:07 pm PST, apologizing for having to leave four hours before his scheduled time.

Francis' arrival at Villamor Air Base in Manila at around 2:00 pm PST was greeted by high-ranking officials of the Armed Forces of the Philippines and Philippine National Police together with their families. Children and the sick lined the apron and were blessed by the pope.

=== Day 4: January 18, Sunday ===
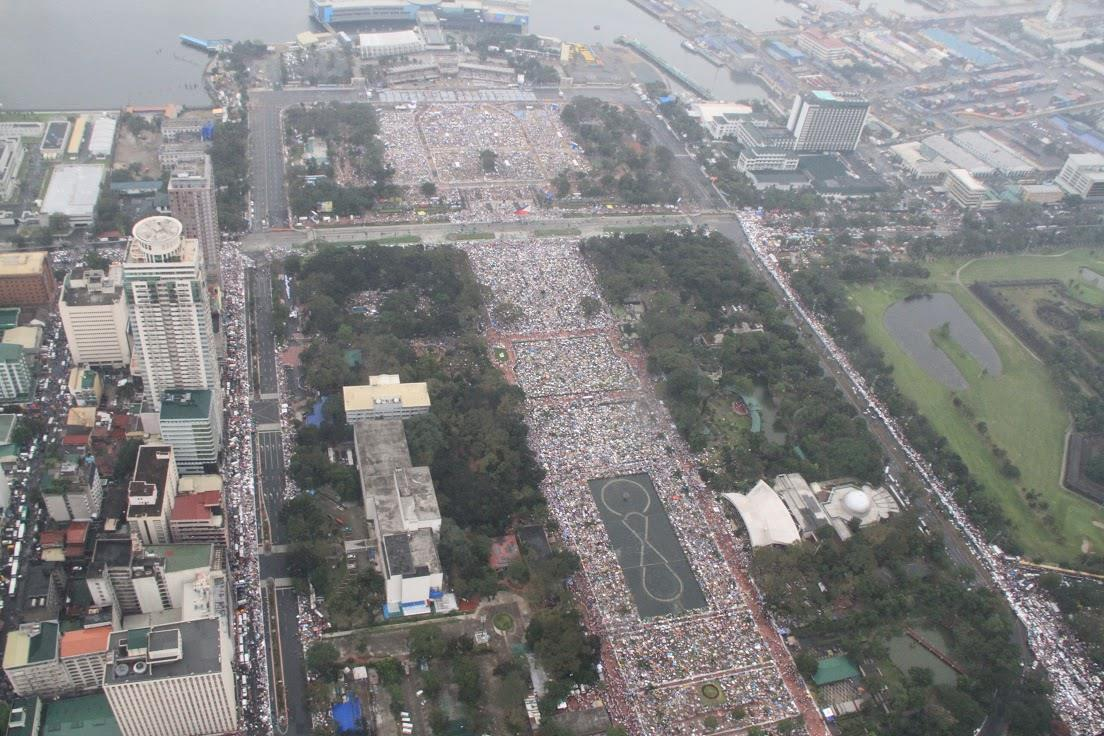
Mass at Rizal Park, Manila

At around 9:25 am PST, Pope Francis entered the main gate along España Boulevard at the University of Santo Tomas. He walked through the Arch of the Centuries and met briefly with representatives of various religions. Among those present were:

- Metropolitan Nektarios Tsilis of the Orthodox Metropolitanate of Hong Kong and Southeast Asia
- Venerable Master Hsing Yun, a Chinese Chan Buddhist monk representing the Fo Guang Shan Monastery in Taiwan
- Rabbi Eliyahu Azaria, head of the Jewish Synagogue in Makati
- Maharaj Rajesh Sharma, a Hindu priest
- Bishop Ephraim Fajutagana, the Obispo Máximo XII of the Philippine Independent Church and concurrent chair of the National Council of Churches in the Philippines
- Bishop Cesar Vicente Punzalan III, chairman of the board of the Philippine Council of Evangelical Churches
- Lilian Sison, former UST Graduate School dean member, Religions for Peace – Philippines
- Julkipli Wadi, Dean of the UP Institute of Islamic Studies
- Imam Ebra Moxir, President of the Imam Council of the Philippines
- Former Supreme Court Chief Justice Reynato Puno, Chairman of the Philippine Bible Society.

After the meeting, Pope Francis circled the university in the popemobile and then met with about 24,000 youth representatives gathered at Santo Tomas Field. The general public were also present in other parts of the university.

At the Quirino Grandstand in Luneta Park, the pope held his third and concluding Mass in the Philippines. The Metropolitan Manila Development Authority estimated that six million people attended, exceeding the five million during John Paul's Mass there for World Youth Day in January 1995; the BBC reported this as the largest papal gathering in history. After the Mass, the crowd sang the 1995 World Youth Day anthem "Tell the World of His Love", followed by the visit's official theme song "We Are All God's Children" led by Jamie Rivera.

=== Day 5: January 19, Monday ===
Pope Francis attended a leave-taking ceremony at the Presidential Pavilion in Villamor Air Base, with a sendoff by then-President Benigno Aquino III, his Cabinet secretaries, and a number of Catholic bishops, before flying back to Rome. The pope departed Manila at 10:12 am PST on a chartered Philippine Airlines Airbus A340-300 (flight PR8010, registered RP-C3439, callsign Shepherd One).

The delegation of religious officials and politicians who were present at the leave-taking ceremony of the pope at the airbase included:

Government officials

- President Benigno Aquino III
- Vice President Jejomar Binay
- Executive Secretary Paquito Ochoa, Jr.
- Foreign Affairs Secretary Albert del Rosario
- Cabinet Secretary Jose Rene Almendras
- Energy Secretary Jericho Petilla
- Science and Technology Secretary Mario Montejo
- Tourism Secretary Ramon Jimenez, Jr.
- Environment and Natural Resources Secretary Ramon Paje
- Agrarian Reform Secretary Virgilio de los Reyes
- Social Welfare and Development Secretary Dinky Soliman
- Trade and Industry Secretary Gregory Domingo
- Labor and Employment Secretary Rosalinda Baldoz
- Agriculture Secretary Proceso Alcala

Religious officials

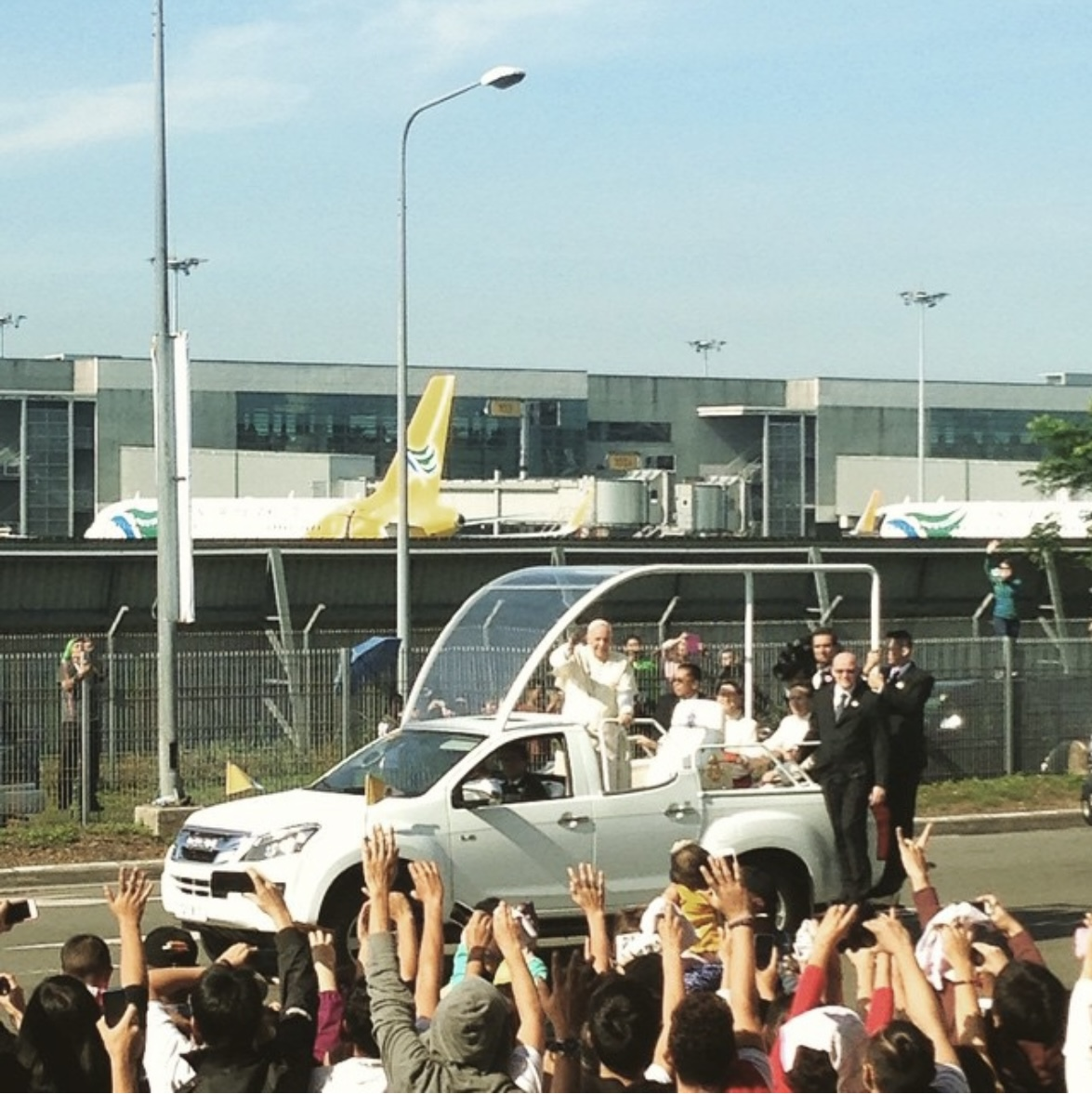
The pope en route to Villamor Air Base

- Archbishop of Manila, Cardinal Luis Antonio Tagle
- Roman Catholic Archdiocese of Manila Chancellor Rufino Sescon
- Pasig Bishop Mylo Hubert Vergara
- Military Ordinary Bishop Leopoldo S. Tumulak
- Ipil Bishop Julius Tonel
- Balanga Bishop Ruperto Santos
- Vicar Apostolic of Taytay Edgardo Juanich
- Imus Bishop Reynaldo G. Evangelista
- San Fernando Auxiliary Bishop Pablo Virgilio David
- Kabankalan Bishop Patricio Buzon, SDB
- Tuguegarao Archbishop Sergio Utleg
- Zamboanga Archbishop Romulo de la Cruz
- Lipa Archbishop Ramon Arguelles

== Economic implications ==
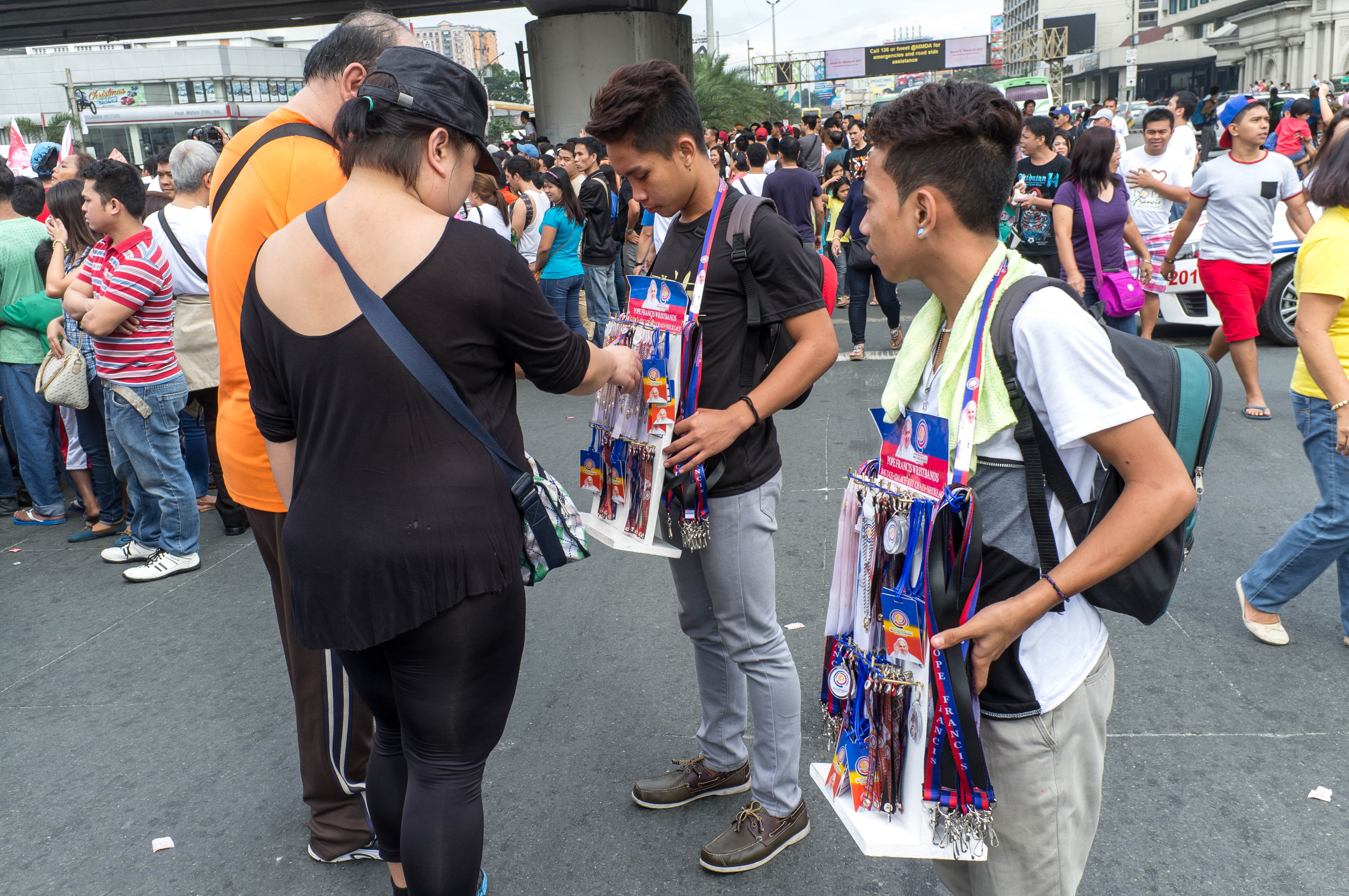
Vendors selling memorabilia in Manila during papal visit

With the declaration of special non-working holidays in Metro Manila on January 15, 16 and 19, the economy was expected to experience lost revenue of millions of dollars. The business sector criticized the government for adding too many non-working holidays every year. According to a study by the Makati Business Club conducted in 2014, non-working holidays generally cost the electronics industry ₱1.2 billion (US$26.7 million) per day, citing figures from SEIPI. While the holiday declaration is not nationwide, workers wanting to see the pope will take leaves, adding labor cost strains to businesses.

President and CEO of the Philippine Stock Exchange (PSE), Hans Sicat, made calls to the government to halt the addition of holidays as lesser trading days. During the holidays, clearing operations at the Bangko Sentral ng Pilipinas were suspended. However, Sicat said that the central bank agreed to run clearing operations on January 19. Sicat argued that closing during three days of the papal visit would cost the government ₱14 million ($311,457.17) in uncollected trading-based taxes.

Security for the visit, including for physical barriers set up along the 11 kilometres (6.8 mi) route from the air base to downtown Manila, was estimated as costing the government ₱200 million ($4.5 million).

Stockbroker Wilson Sy, who manages the Philequity Fund, said that while the papal visit had minimal direct monetary benefits, it caused investors to be "reminded" about the country. He noted that the Philippine Stock Exchange Index closed at 7,490.88 on January 14, a record, described by economic analysts as a "papal rally" reflecting the positive outlook of local and foreign investors. A successful and peaceful papal visit increased investor confidence to do business in the country.

== Controversies ==
=== Alleged abuse of street children ===
Philippine police authorities were reported to have rounded up street children, some as young as five years old, around Metro Manila and sent them to detention centers alongside adults. Detained children were reported to be treated poorly, suffering from physical and sexual abuse, starvation, denied an education and denied basic human dignity. Children who attempted to escape were reportedly chained to pillars if caught. Officials through Pasay social welfare department chief, Rosalinda Orobia, in response to an inquiry by Manila Standard, asserted that they were rounding up street children to protect the pope from street children gangs. Orabia also said that such actions were done to prevent the gangs from taking advantage of the pope. Manila Standard criticized Orobia's statement claiming that the authorities were more concerned with making the city presentable to the pope on his visit.

On January 16, Department of Social Welfare and Development (DSWD) secretary Dinky Soliman denied the reports and asserted that the government does not tolerate the practices reported. Soliman also said that the photos published by the report were photos taken in the past. Soliman said that "Corrective measures have been undertaken since the time that the reports came out." She pointed at a photo of a child named Federico who was shown to be malnourished. The photo was in fact taken in 2014, nearly 7 months after the child's admission to the Reception and Action Center, and had previously appeared in other international news articles focusing on conditions in the center. "Federico has already gained weight and is being cared for by an NGO with DSWD. We have found his mother and we are currently doing case work management with the mother," Soliman said.

Secretary Soliman ordered that allegations of children rights abuse in children's centers in Parañaque and Pasay be investigated. Regarding the Manila Reception Action Center, which was a subject of the report by numerous international news outlets throughout late 2014, and again in relation to the pope's visit, Soliman said that the DSWD was facilitating the closure of the facility. She stated that its child residents were being transferred to NGOs licensed by the DSWD and to government facilities.

=== Temporary relocation of homeless people ===
Homeless people were temporarily relocated. The government alleged this was to protect them from crime syndicates and not to keep them out of sight.

=== Aquino's speech in Malacañang ===
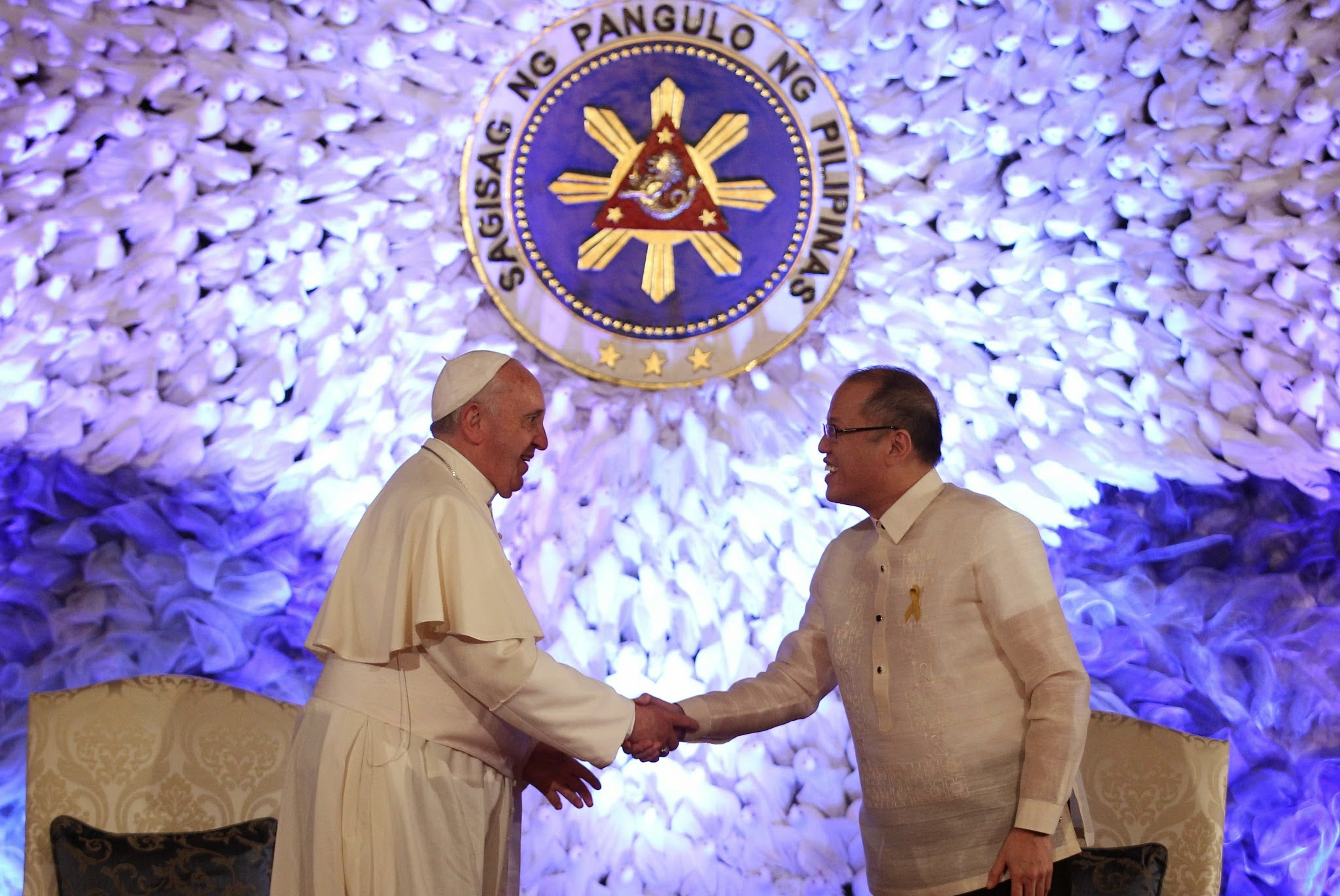
Pope and President at Malacañang.

The then-President Benigno Aquino III's speech at the Malacañang Palace during his courtesy call with Pope Francis turned out to be controversial, drawing mixed responses from netizens. Aquino criticized the local Church for its inaction against the "past administration's abuses" which was interpreted as a reference to former President Gloria Macapagal Arroyo. Some netizens praised Aquino's honesty while some called Aquino's speech inappropriate and criticized its timing.

Cardinal Luis Tagle described Aquino's speech as a "commentary of previous administration". He noted that many speeches made by Aquino since his presidency referred to the previous administration of Gloria Macapagal Arroyo and how he inherited some issues left by his predecessor. Tagle also stated: "I think [Aquino] was coming from a deeply personal experience and also a deeply political experience. The personal experience that shaped that type of interpretation of facts was his own suffering during martial law and his appreciation for the role of Church during that time." Tagle was quick to add that the focus of the public must be directed at the papal visit since the issue regarding Aquino's speech can be explored after the visit.

Vatican spokesman Father Federico Lombardi described the speech as "rather original because there is not always such a speech during the formal ceremonies of reception of the Pope." Lombardi also added that the speech was also "very interesting" and showed "two different perspectives"; one of "the politician and of the Pope".

=== "Passing around" of Sacred hosts ===
An estimated 3 to 6 million communicants attended the final Mass, concelebrated by 2,500 priests and 200-250 bishops, at Rizal Park on January 18. Anticipating this, some 5,000 "Communion distributors" and 5,000 "Communion ushers" assisted in the distribution of about 2.5 million Communion hosts, which were consecrated a day prior. During the Mass, rainfall soaked the communicants and made it difficult for the priests and extraordinary ministers to administer Communion, especially to the farthest reaches of the park. A report by GMA News stated that communicants, including extraordinary ministers, "passed around" the sacred hosts for those at the back of the long queues in what the report described as the practice of bayanihan. Some observers viewed the act as a sacrilege to the host.

== Incidents ==
- A few hours after the mass officiated by the pope in Tacloban, a 27-year-old volunteer named Kristel Mae Padasas working for Catholic Relief Services died at Daniel Z. Romualdez Airport after scaffoldings near the altar fell on her.
- On January 17, 2015, a Bombardier Global Express plane carrying several Cabinet secretaries of President Benigno Aquino III skidded off the runway of Daniel Z. Romualdez Airport in Tacloban. All the 12 passengers and 3 crew members were safe. The plane bears the aircraft registration RP-C9363 and was operated by Challenger Aero Corporation Metro Manila.
- Ten people suffered minor injuries after an early Sunday morning scuffle broke out at an entrance to the Quirino Grandstand, after a group of attendees to the pope's final mass became impatient and tried to gain entry to the venue.
