= Miss Earth 2017 =

17th Miss Earth pageant

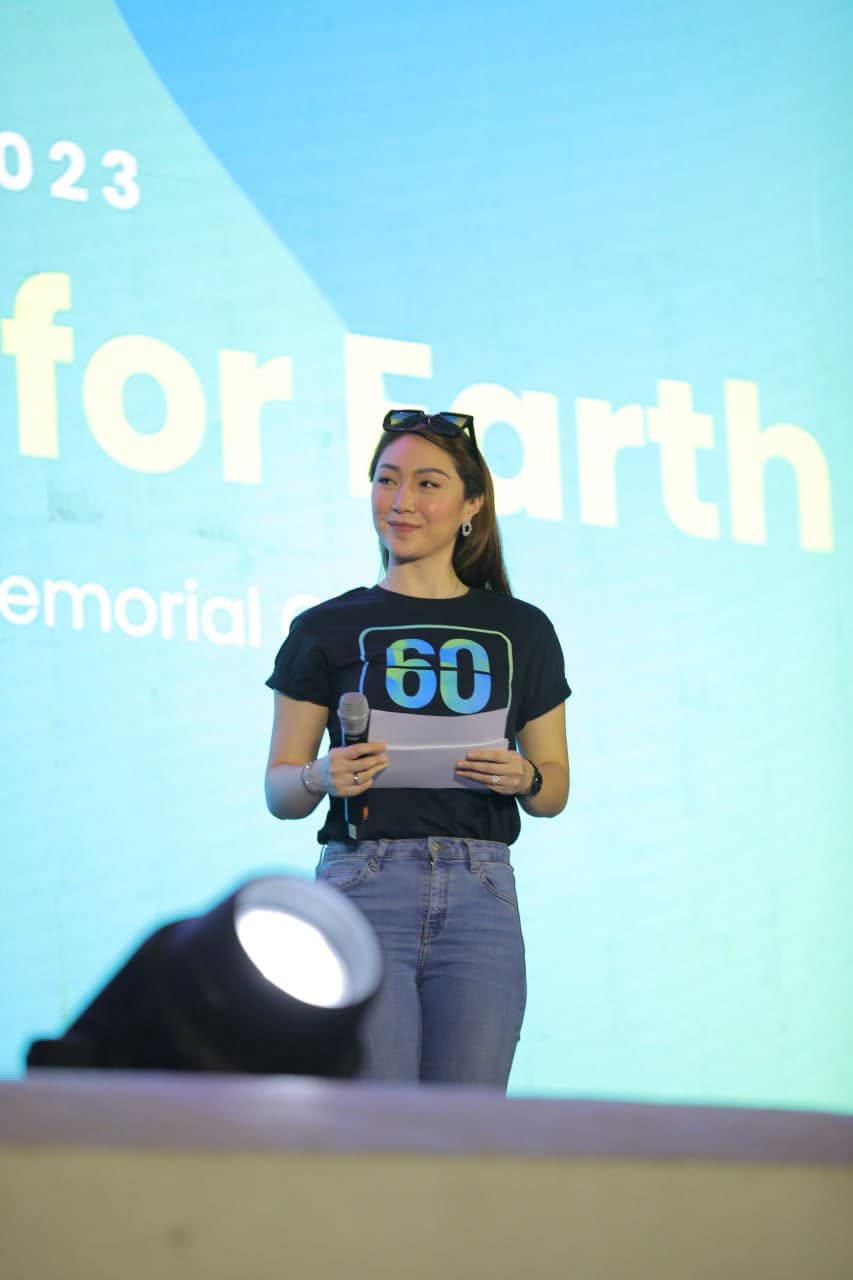
- Karen Ibasco
- Date: November 4, 2017
- Presenters: James Deakin
- Entertainment: Shontelle; Iskandar Widjaja
- Theme: Heroines Fighting Climate Change
- Venue: SM Mall of Asia Arena, Pasay, Metro Manila, Philippines
- Broadcaster: ABS-CBN; Facebook Live; FOX Life; Globovisión; MVS Comunicaciones; Rappler; SCCN Channel 17; ZAP TV; SKTV2 channel science and technology
- Entrants: 85
- Placements: 16
- Debuts: Angola; Belarus
- Withdrawals: Guam; Haiti; Iraq; Kenya; Macau; Namibia; Palestine; Romania; Scotland; Slovak Republic; South Africa; Suriname; Uruguay; Zimbabwe
- Returns: Cambodia; Cameroon; Costa Rica; Crimea; Ethiopia; France; Honduras; Puerto Rico; Rwanda; Samoa; Spain; Tonga; United States Virgin Islands
- Winner: Karen Ibasco; Philippines
- Photogenic: Lê Thị Hà Thu; Vietnam

Miss Earth 2017 was the 17th edition of the Miss Earth pageant, held at the SM Mall of Asia Arena in Bay City, Pasay, Metro Manila, the Philippines, on November 4, 2017.

Katherine Espín of Ecuador crowned Karen Ibasco of the Philippines as her successor at the end of the event. Ibasco's crowning marks the fourth time the Philippines won the Miss Earth title—the most in the pageant's history.

== Results ==
=== Placements ===
Placement	Contestant
Miss Earth 2017	Philippines – Karen Ibasco
Miss Earth – Air 2017	Australia – Nina Robertson
Miss Earth – Water 2017	Colombia – Juliana Franco
Miss Earth – Fire 2017	Russia – Lada Akimova
Top 8	Czech Republic – Iva Uchytilová; Netherlands – Faith Landman; Thailand – Paweensuda Drouin; Venezuela – Ninoska Vásquez
Top 16	Angola – Ermelinda De Matos; Bosnia and Herzegovina – Jelena Karagić; Cameroon – Angèle Kossinda; Guatemala – María José Castañeda; Switzerland – Sarah Laura Peyrel; Tonga – Diamond Langi; United States – Andreia Gibau; Vietnam – Lê Thị Hà Thu

NOTE (*): For this year's pageant, there were no first, second and third runners-up. Instead, the non-winning elemental queens were of equal ranking (they are all runners-up), with each being eligible to replace the winner if it were necessary. Therefore, first, second and third before the word runner-up here is only formal.

== Preliminary rounds ==
=== Figure and form ===
Result	Delegate
Top 16	Australia – Nina Robertson; Bosnia and Herzegovina – Jelena Karagić; Brazil – Yasmin Engelke; Canada – Jacqueline Marsh; Netherlands – Faith Landman; Panama – Erika Parker; Philippines – Karen Ibasco; Poland – Dominika Szymańska; Puerto Rico – Karla Aponte; Russia – Lada Akimova; Switzerland – Sarah Laura Peyrel; Thailand – Paweensuda Drouin; United States – Andreia Gibau; Venezuela – Ninoska Vásquez; Vietnam – Lê Thị Hà Thu; Wales – Sophie Bettridge

=== Beauty of face and poise ===
Result	Delegate
Top 16	Australia – Nina Robertson; Bolivia – Giancarla Fernández; Bosnia and Herzegovina – Jelena Karagić; Colombia – Juliana Franco; Costa Rica – Fernanda Rodríguez; Ecuador – Lessie Giler; Honduras – Valeria Cardona; Israel – Elian Qupty; Netherlands – Faith Landman; Russia – Lada Akimova; Serbia – Marija Nikić; Switzerland – Sarah Laura Peyrel; Thailand – Paweensuda Drouin; Tonga – Diamond Langi; Ukraine – Diana Mironenko; Venezuela – Ninoska Vásquez

=== Intelligence and environmental awareness ===
Result	Delegate
Top 16	Australia – Nina Robertson; Belize – Iris Salguero; Colombia – Juliana Franco; Costa Rica – Fernanda Rodríguez; Czech Republic – Iva Uchytilová; Denmark – Sabrina Jovanović; England – Charlotte Brooke; Guatemala – María José Castañeda; India – Shaan Suhas Kumar; Indonesia – Michelle Alriani; Netherlands – Faith Landman; Philippines – Karen Ibasco; Switzerland – Sarah Laura Peyrel; Thailand – Paweensuda Drouin; Tonga – Diamond Langi; United States – Andreia Gibau

== Pre-pageant activities ==
=== Medalists ===
Event		Gold	Silver	Bronze
Press Presentation (Darling of the Press)		Karen Ibasco; Philippines	Paweensuda Drouin; Thailand	Abigail Chama; Zambia
Miss Photogenic (On-line Voting)		Lê Thị Hà Thu; Vietnam	Juliana Franco; Colombia	Ninoska Vásquez; Venezuela
Best in Eco-Beauty Video Presentation		Karla Aponte; Puerto Rico	Tugs-Amgalan; Mongolia	Angèle Kossinda; Cameroon
Swimsuit Competition
Swimsuit Competition	Group 1	Nina Robertson; Australia	Ninoska Vásquez; Venezuela	Lessie Giler; Ecuador
Swimsuit Competition	Group 2	Karen Ibasco; Philippines	Karen Rojas; Peru	Lada Akimova; Russia
Swimsuit Competition	Group 3	Karla Aponte; Puerto Rico	Sarah Laura Peyrel; Switzerland	Andreia Gibau; United States
Talent Competition
Talent Competition	Group 1	Elena Trifonova; Crimea	María José Castañeda; Guatemala	Sophie Bettridge; Wales
Talent Competition	Group 2	Lada Akimova; Russia	Elsa Antoun; Lebanon	Amelie Zhao; Taiwan
Talent Competition	Group 3	Artemis Charalambous; Cyprus	Mona Taio; Cook Islands	Lê Thị Hà Thu; Vietnam
Resorts Wear Competition
Resorts Wear Competition	Group 1	Ninoska Vásquez; Venezuela	Faith Landman; Netherlands; Dominika Szymańska; Poland	Valeria Cardona; Honduras; Sophie Bettridge; Wales
Resorts Wear Competition	Group 2	Lada Akimova; Russia	Karen Ibasco; Philippines	Karen Rojas; Peru
Resorts Wear Competition	Group 3	Lê Thị Hà Thu; Vietnam	Andreia Gibau; United States	Diana Mironenko; Ukraine
Long Gown Competition
Long Gown Competition	Group 1	Ninoska Vásquez; Venezuela	Paweensuda Drouin; Thailand	Faith Landman; Netherlands; Erika Parker; Panama
Long Gown Competition	Group 2	Karen Rojas; Peru	Fernanda Rodríguez; Costa Rica; Karen Ibasco; Philippines	Eucharia Akani; Nigeria
Long Gown Competition	Group 3	Karla Aponte; Puerto Rico	Karen Bustos; Mexico	Lê Thị Hà Thu; Vietnam
Miss Friendship
Miss Friendship	Group 1	Hannah Lee; South Korea	Ismatu Daramy; Sierra Leone	Camilla Fogestedt; Sweden
Miss Friendship	Group 2	Yasuyo Saito; Japan	Ainara de Santamaría; Spain	Karen Rojas; Peru
Miss Friendship	Group 3	Diamond Langi; Tonga	Sarah Laura Peyrel; Switzerland	Shaan Suhas Kumar; India
National Costume Competition
National Costume Competition	South America	Giancarla Fernández; Bolivia	Ninoska Vásquez; Venezuela	Valeria Ivasiuten; Paraguay
National Costume Competition	Asia Pacific	Karen Ibasco; Philippines	Paweensuda Drouin; Thailand	Yasuyo Saito; Japan
National Costume Competition	North America	María José Castañeda; Guatemala	Jacqueline Marsh; Canada	Íngrid Franco; Dominican Republic
National Costume Competition	Africa	Maud Fadi; Ghana	Ermelinda De Matos; Angola	Angèle Kossinda; Cameroon
National Costume Competition	Western Europe	Glória Silva; Portugal	Fabiana Barra; Italy	Sophie Bettridge; Wales
National Costume Competition	Eastern Europe	Lada Akimova; Russia	Artemis Charalambous; Cyprus	Sara Gavranič; Slovenia

=== Special awards ===
Award	Delegate
Miss Earth Eco-Warrior ( (gold) medal event)	Vietnam – Lê Thị Hà Thu
Miss IPPCA	Thailand – Paweensuda Drouin
Miss JACMI	Puerto Rico – Karla Victoria Aponte
Miss Laus Group	Ecuador – Lessie Giler
Miss Pontefino Hotel	Ukraine – Diana Mironenko
Miss Pontefino Estates	Northern Ireland – Maire Lynch
Miss Rotary Club of Makati	Ecuador – Lessie Giler
Miss Charmulets	Colombia – Juliana Franco
Miss Versailles	Netherlands – Faith Landman
Miss Gotesco	Netherlands – Faith Landman

=== Miss Earth Hannah's ===
A special mini-pageant was held on October 14 at Hannah's Beach Resort and Convention Center, Pagudpud, Ilocos Norte. Ten selected candidates competed in aswimsuit competition, long gown competition and question and answer portion. Here are the results:

Miss Earth Hannah's 2017

- Thailand – Paweensuda Drouin

1st Runner-Up

- Venezuela – Ninoska Vásquez

2nd Runner-Up

- Ecuador – Lessie Giler Sanchez

Best in Swimsuit

- Venezuela – Ninoska Vásquez

Best in Long Gown

- Thailand – Paweensuda Drouin

Other Delegates

- Austria – Bianca Kronsteiner
- Czech Republic – Iva Uchytilová
- Guatemala – Maria José Castañeda
- Israel – Elian Qupty
- South Korea – Hannah Lee
- Sweden – Camilla Fogestedt
- Uganda – Josephine Mutesi

== Contestants ==
Listed below are the 85 delegates that have competed for the title:

Country/Territory	Contestant	Age	Height (Note: As listed in the candidates' respective profile in the Miss Earth website.)	Hometown	Group
Angola	Ermelinda De Matos	23	1.77 m (5 ft 9 1/2 in)	Luanda	2
Argentina	Fiorela Hengemühler	19	1.70 m (5 ft 7 in)	L.N. Alem	3
Australia	Nina Robertson	21	1.71 m (5 ft 7 1/2 in)	Melbourne	1
Austria	Bianca Kronsteiner	19	1.65 m (5 ft 5 in)	Linz	1
Bahamas	Brittania Alexa Mitchell	22	1.72 m (5 ft 7 1/2 in)	Abaco	3
Belarus	Polli Cannabis	22	1.80 m (5 ft 11 in)	Minsk	2
Belgium	Lauralyn Vermeersch	26	1.76 m (5 ft 9 1/2 in)	Smetlede	2
Belize	Iris Salguero	21	1.75 m (5 ft 9 in)	San Pedro	2
Bolivia	Giancarla Fernández	18	1.76 m (5 ft 9 1/2 in)	Santa Cruz	3
Bosnia and Herzegovina	Jelena Karagić	23	1.77 m (5 ft 9 1/2 in)	Banjaluka	3
Brazil	Yasmin Engelke	21	1.78 m (5 ft 10 in)	Belém	3
Cambodia	Em Kunthong	18	1.72 m (5 ft 7 1/2 in)	Sihanoukville	3
Cameroon	Angèle Kossinda	24	1.75 m (5 ft 9 in)	Douala	2
Canada	Jacqueline Marsh	22	1.81 m (5 ft 11 1/2 in)	Thunder Bay	2
Chile	Sofía Manzur	20	1.75 m (5 ft 9 in)	La Calera	2
China	Mei Zhan	25	1.78 m (5 ft 10 in)	Yunnan	3
Colombia	Juliana Franco	24	1.73 m (5 ft 8 in)	Villavicencio	2
Cook Islands	Mona Taio	22	1.71 m (5 ft 7 1/2 in)	Arorangi	3
Costa Rica	Fernanda Rodríguez	19	1.70 m (5 ft 7 in)	Quesada	2
Crimea	Elena Trifonova	18	1.76 m (5 ft 9 1/2 in)	Sevastopol	1
Croatia	Bonita Kristić	25	1.73 m (5 ft 8 in)	Zagreb	3
Cyprus	Artemis Charalambous	21	1.68 m (5 ft 6 in)	Limassol	3
Czech Republic	Iva Uchytilová	19	1.78 m (5 ft 10 in)	Chrudim	1
Denmark	Sabrina Jovanović	24	1.74 m (5 ft 8 1/2 in)	Copenhagen	1
Dominican Republic	Íngrid Franco	21	1.80 m (5 ft 11 in)	Santo Domingo	2
Ecuador	Lessie Giler	18	1.70 m (5 ft 7 in)	Portoviejo	1
England	Charlotte Brooke	25	1.83 m (6 ft 0 in)	Wokingham	2
Ethiopia	Mekdalawit Mequanent	19	1.76 m (5 ft 9 1/2 in)	Addis Ababa	1
France	Melissa Strugen	20	1.72 m (5 ft 7 1/2 in)	France	2
Ghana	Maud Fadi	25	1.72 m (5 ft 7 1/2 in)	Accra	3
Guadeloupe	Morganne Nestar	20	1.72 m (5 ft 7 1/2 in)	Les Abymes	3
Guatemala	María José Castañeda	18	1.75 m (5 ft 9 in)	Guatemala City	1
Honduras	Valeria Cardona	19	1.70 m (5 ft 7 in)	Tegucigalpa	1
Hungary	Viktória Viczián	20	1.70 m (5 ft 7 in)	Budapest	2
India	Shaan Suhas Kumar	26	1.72 m (5 ft 7 1/2 in)	Bhopal	3
Indonesia	Michelle Alriani	20	1.68 m (5 ft 6 in)	Bandung	1
Israel	Elian Qupty	24	1.78 m (5 ft 10 in)	Nazareth	1
Italy	Fabiana Enrica Barra	20	1.73 m (5 ft 8 in)	Cornedo Vicentino	3
Japan	Yasuyo Saito	21	1.71 m (5 ft 7 1/2 in)	Fukuoka	2
Kyrgyzstan	Begimai Nazarova	20	1.73 m (5 ft 8 in)	Bishkek	2
Lebanon	Elsa Antoun	25	1.69 m (5 ft 6 1/2 in)	Beirut	2
Malaysia	Cherish Ng	23	1.70 m (5 ft 7 in)	Tanjung Tokong	3
Malta	Christie Refalo	26	1.70 m (5 ft 7 in)	Luqa	3
Mauritius	Yanishta Gopaul	19	1.72 m (5 ft 7 1/2 in)	Rose Hill	2
Mexico	Karen Bustos	19	1.83 m (6 ft 0 in)	San Luis Potosi	3
Moldova	Veronica Buzovoi	21	1.72 m (5 ft 7 1/2 in)	Chişinau	1
Mongolia	Tugs-Amgalan Batjargal	26	1.72 m (5 ft 7 1/2 in)	Ulaanbaatar	1
Myanmar	Tin Sandar Myo	26	1.72 m (5 ft 7 1/2 in)	Yangon	2
Nepal	Rojina Shrestha	24	1.76 m (5 ft 9 1/2 in)	Kathmandu	2
Netherlands	Faith Landman	20	1.77 m (5 ft 9 1/2 in)	Gouda	1
New Zealand	Abbigail Sturgin	20	1.67 m (5 ft 5 1/2 in)	Auckland	1
Nigeria	Eucharia Akani	19	1.85 m (6 ft 1 in)	Lagos	2
Northern Ireland	Maire Lynch	19	1.65 m (5 ft 5 in)	Derry	3
Pakistan	Ramina Ashfaque	24	1.70 m (5 ft 7 in)	Karachi	2
Panama	Erika Parker	23	1.76 m (5 ft 9 1/2 in)	Colón	1
Paraguay	Valeria Ivasiuten	22	1.74 m (5 ft 8 1/2 in)	Itapua	1
Peru	Karen Rojas	24	1.72 m (5 ft 7 1/2 in)	Moyobamba	2
Philippines	Karen Ibasco	26	1.70 m (5 ft 7 in)	Manila	2
Poland	Dominika Szymańska	22	1.77 m (5 ft 9 1/2 in)	Warsaw	1
Portugal	Glória Silva	20	1.67 m (5 ft 5 1/2 in)	Póvoa de Varzim	3
Puerto Rico	Karla Victoria Aponte	19	1.75 m (5 ft 9 in)	San Juan	3
Réunion	Emma Lauret	19	1.72 m (5 ft 7 1/2 in)	Saint-Leu	3
Russia	Lada Akimova	18	1.71 m (5 ft 7 1/2 in)	Yekaterinburg	2
Rwanda	Uwase Hirwa Honorine	24	1.71 m (5 ft 7 1/2 in)	Kigali	3
Samoa	Olivia Howman	24	1.78 m (5 ft 10 in)	Apia	2
Serbia	Marija Nikić	18	1.74 m (5 ft 8 1/2 in)	Zrenjanin	3
Sierra Leone	Ismatu Daramy	26	1.75 m (5 ft 9 in)	Freetown	1
Singapore	Elizabeth Camilia Lee	26	1.65 m (5 ft 5 in)	Singapore	1
Slovenia	Sara Gavranič	21	1.70 m (5 ft 7 in)	Postojna	2
South Korea	Hannah Lee	20	1.72 m (5 ft 7 1/2 in)	Geoje	1
Spain	Ainara de Santamaría	21	1.78 m (5 ft 10 in)	Argoños	2
Sri Lanka	Shyama Dahanayaka	23	1.68 m (5 ft 6 in)	Kurunagala	3
Sweden	Camilla Fogestedt	25	1.79 m (5 ft 10 1/2 in)	Kungsbacka	1
Switzerland	Sarah Laura Peyrel	21	1.72 m (5 ft 7 1/2 in)	Bern	3
Taiwan	Amelie Zhao	26	1.70 m (5 ft 7 in)	Taipei	2
Thailand	Paweensuda Drouin	23	1.81 m (5 ft 11 1/2 in)	Bangkok	1
Tonga	Diamond Langi	25	1.77 m (5 ft 9 1/2 in)	Nukuʻalofa	3
Uganda	Josephine Mutesi	24	1.75 m (5 ft 9 in)	Iganga	1
Ukraine	Diana Mironenko	23	1.76 m (5 ft 9 1/2 in)	Odesa	3
United States	Andreia Gibau	22	1.79 m (5 ft 10 1/2 in)	Brockton	3
United States Virgin Islands	Kaylee Carlberg	26	1.73 m (5 ft 8 in)	Lincoln	1
Venezuela	Ninoska Vásquez	25	1.71 m (5 ft 7 1/2 in)	Barquisimeto	1
Vietnam	Lê Thị Hà Thu	25	1.71 m (5 ft 7 1/2 in)	Thừa Thiên - Huế	3
Wales	Sophie Bettridge	22	1.75 m (5 ft 9 in)	Tredegar	1
Zambia	Abigail Chama	26	1.72 m (5 ft 7 1/2 in)	Lusaka	3

== Notes ==
=== Returns ===
Last competed in 2005:

- Cambodia

Last competed in 2008:

- Ethiopia
- Rwanda

Last competed in 2010:

- Cameroon

Last competed in 2014:

- Puerto Rico
- Samoa
- Tonga
- United States Virgin Islands

Last competed in 2015:

- Costa Rica
- Crimea
- France
- Honduras
- Spain

=== Withdrawals ===
- Iraq
- Kenya
- Macau
- Namibia
- Palestine
- Romania
- Slovak Republic
- Suriname
- Uruguay
- Zimbabwe

=== Replacements ===
- Belgium — Kimberly Driege has been replaced by Lauralyn Vermeersch. Kimberly has to recover from the tragic disaster caused by the earthquake in Mexico where she lives.
- Brazil — Bruna Vizintin, the original winner of Miss Brazil Earth 2017 pageant, was dethroned by the new organization because she was unable to agree with some duties on her contract. Yasmin Engelke, the 4th runner-up was announced as Brasil's representative this year.
- Ghana — Paula Ethel Masopeh was replaced by Maud Fadi due to health problems.
- Sierra Leone — Ismatu Daramy replaced Claudia Josephine Suma, a finalist at the recently concluded Miss Earth Sierra Leone 2017 who supposedly replaced Esther Williams following Esther's indication of her inability to participate and represent Sierra Leone at the upcoming Miss Earth 2017 pageant.
- Spain – Noemí Sartal has been dethroned and was replaced by Ainara de Santamaría Villamor, the 2nd runner-up from the national pageant

=== Did not compete ===
- Aruba — Tania Nunes
- British Virgin Islands — Dayna Layne
- Germany — Victoria Selivanov — competed in Miss International 2017 but unplaced.
- Greenland — Anja Chemnitz
- Guam — Emma Sheedy — did not meet the minimum age requirement but will compete in Miss Earth 2018 instead.
- Haiti — Anaika Gaspard — attended the preliminary activities but withdrew before the pageant night.
- Kosovo — Andina Pura — competed in The Miss Globe 2017 and awarded Miss Photogenic.
- Liberia — Wokie Dolo — competed in Miss World 2017 and placed Top 40.
- Scotland — Christina Chalk — was not able to compete due to schedule conflicts.
- South Africa — Irini Moutzouris — attended the preliminary activities but didn't attended the finals for not meeting the minimum height requirement.
- Tanzania — Lilian Loth

== Broadcasters ==
Broadcasters	Coverage
ABS-CBN	Delayed telecast (November 5, 2017) in the Philippines.
Facebook Live	Livestream on the Facebook page of Miss Earth.
FOX Life	Live broadcast in Australia, China, Hong Kong, India, Indonesia, Japan, Malaysia, New Zealand, Philippines, Singapore, Taiwan, Thailand, and Vietnam.
Globovisión	Broadcast in Venezuela and through DirecTV cable channels in Argentina, Aruba, Barbados, Chile, Colombia, Curaçao, Ecuador, Peru, Puerto Rico, Trinidad and Tobago, and Uruguay.
MVS Comunicaciones	Broadcast in Central and South America, Canada, the Caribbean, Mexico, and the United States.
Rappler	Online livestream on its official website and YouTube channel.
SCCN Channel 17	Broadcast in Suriname.
ZAP TV	Broadcast in Portuguese-speaking African countries.

== See also ==
- Miss Universe 2017
- Miss World 2017
- Miss International 2017
