= Miss Earth 2018 =

18th Miss Earth pageant

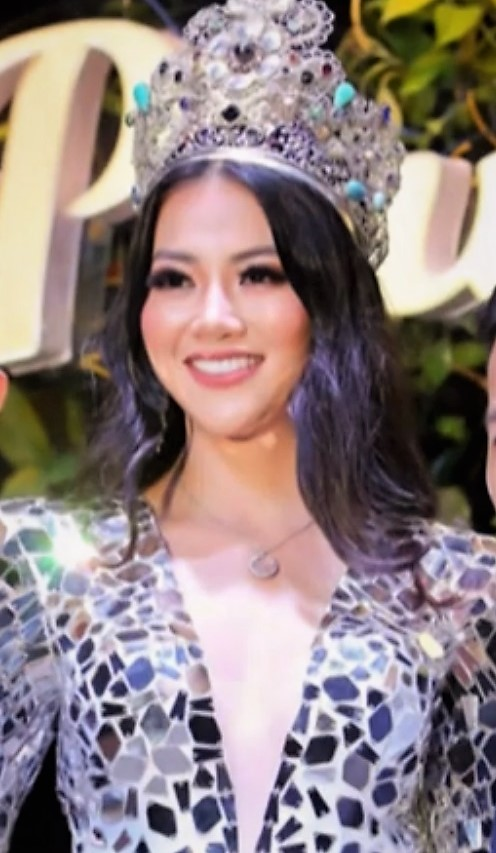
- Nguyễn Phương Khánh
- Date: November 3, 2018; 8 years ago
- Presenters: James Deakin
- Entertainment: Brian McKnight
- Theme: Goddesses of the Earth
- Venue: SM Mall of Asia Arena, Pasay, Metro Manila, Philippines
- Broadcaster: Live Telecast: Fox Life; GMA Network; MVS Comunicaciones; Telecaribe; Globovisión; Telecentro; Suriname Cable and Communication Network; ZAP (satellite television) and SKTV1-Vietnam; Live Stream: Miss Earth Facebook page; Miss Earth YouTube channel
- Entrants: 87
- Placements: 18
- Debuts: Montenegro
- Withdrawals: Angola; Canada; Cook Islands; Ethiopia; Kyrgyzstan; Lebanon; Mongolia; Pakistan; Switzerland; Taiwan; Uganda; United States Virgin Islands; Wales
- Returns: Armenia; Cuba; Curaçao; Egypt; Germany; Greece; Guam; Guyana; Haiti; Ireland; Liberia; Romania; South Africa; Trinidad and Tobago
- Winner: Nguyễn Phương Khánh; Vietnam

Miss Earth 2018 was the 18th edition of the Miss Earth pageant, held at the SM Mall of Asia Arena in Bay City, Pasay, Metro Manila, the Philippines, on November 3, 2018.

Karen Ibasco of the Philippines crowned her successor Nguyễn Phương Khánh of Vietnam at the end of the event. This is the first time Vietnam won the Miss Earth pageant, one of the Big Four International Beauty Pageants.

In August 2019, the Miss Earth 2018 winners and the Armed Forces of the Philippines conducted an outreach program for the welfare of the senior citizens and persons with disabilities admitted at the Veterans Memorial Medical Center in the Philippines.

== Results ==
=== Placements ===
Placement	Contestant
Miss Earth 2018	Vietnam – Nguyễn Phương Khánh
Miss Earth – Air 2018	Austria – Melanie Mader
Miss Earth – Water 2018	Colombia – Valeria Ayos
Miss Earth – Fire 2018	Mexico – Melissa Flores §
Top 8	Italy – Sofia Pavan; Philippines – Celeste Cortesi; Portugal – Telma Madeira; Venezuela – Diana Silva
Top 12	Chile – Antonia Figueroa; Netherlands – Margaretha de Jong; Slovenia – Danijela Burjan; South Africa – Margo Fargo
Top 18	Brazil – Sayonara Veras; Ghana – Belvy Naa; Japan – Mio Tanaka; Montenegro – Katarina Seckovic; Nepal – Priya Sigdel §; Romania – Denisse Andor

(§) – Placed in the Top 18 are two spots chosen by the People and Judges for the Best Eco-Video (1) and Best Eco-Social Media (1) Awardees

== Background ==
On July 26, 2018, it was announced through Miss Earth Organization's social media accounts that the pageant will be held in the Philippines again from October 6 to November 3.

The live telecast of the pageant's coronation night will be held at the Mall of Asia Arena in Pasay for the third consecutive year.

On October 20, 2018, Miss Earth announced on their Facebook page that they will have this year's Eco-Video and Eco-Media Award winners, automatic fast-tracks to the Top 18. Two candidates will earn two spots through the preliminary panel of judges and by the votes of social media.

== Pre Pageant Activities ==
=== Medalists ===
Event		Gold	Silver	Bronze
National Costume Competition
National Costume Competition	Asia & Oceania	Nguyễn Phương Khánh; Vietnam	Nirada Chetsadapriyakun; Thailand	Celeste Cortesi; Philippines
National Costume Competition	North & Central America	Melissa Flores; Mexico	Diana Lemos; Panama	Lisa Hayet; Guatemala
National Costume Competition	South America	Xamiera Kippins; Guyana	Diana Valdivieso; Ecuador	Jessica Russo; Peru
National Costume Competition	Africa	Alma Nancy Sesay; Sierra Leone	Margret Konie; Zambia	Maristella Okpala; Nigeria
National Costume Competition	Western Europe	Carolina Jane de Ferreira; Spain	Telma Madeira; Portugal	Sofia Pavan; Italy
National Costume Competition	Eastern Europe	Nina Jovanović; Serbia	Ksenia Sarina; Crimea	Katarina Šećković; Montenegro
Evening Gown Competition
Evening Gown Competition	AIR Group	Danijela Burjan; Slovenia	Celeste Cortesi; Philippines	Jessica Russo; Peru
Evening Gown Competition	WATER Group	Nguyễn Phương Khánh; Vietnam	Sofia Pavan; Italy	Guo Yameng; China
Evening Gown Competition	FIRE Group	Nirada Chetsadapriyakun; Thailand	Gabriela Franceschini; Dominican Republic	Denisse Andor; Romania
Swimsuit Competition
Swimsuit Competition	AIR Group	Telma Madeira; Portugal	Celeste Cortesi; Philippines	Danijela Burjan; Slovenia
Swimsuit Competition	WATER Group	Melissa Flores; Mexico	Nguyễn Phương Khánh; Vietnam	Nađa Pepić; Bosnia and Herzegovina
Swimsuit Competition	FIRE Group	Diana Silva; Venezuela	Gabriela Franceschini; Dominican Republic	Carolina Jane de Ferreira; Spain
Resort Wear Competition
Resort Wear Competition	AIR Group	Celeste Cortesi; Philippines	Valeria Ayos; Colombia	Nishi Bhardwaj; India
Resort Wear Competition	WATER Group	Melissa Flores; Mexico	Christie van Schalkwyk; Northern Ireland	Nađa Pepić; Bosnia and Herzegovina; Sofia Pavan; Italy
Resort Wear Competition	FIRE Group	Diana Silva; Venezuela	Margaretha de Jong; Netherlands	Carolina Jane de Ferreira; Spain
Talent Competition
Talent Competition	AIR Group	Danijela Burjan; Slovenia	Afeya Jeffrey; Trinidad and Tobago	Antonia Figueroa; Chile
Talent Competition	WATER Group	Melanie Mader; Austria	Xamiera Kippins; Guyana	Krystal Xamairy; Puerto Rico
Talent Competition	FIRE Group	Daria Kartyshova; Russia	Priya Sigdel; Nepal	Nirada Chetsadapriyakun; Thailand

=== Local Special Awards ===
Award	Delegate
Miss Earth Goes Plastic Free: 1st Runner-up; 2nd Runner-up	Nigeria – Maristella Okpala; Indonesia – Ratu Vashti Annisa; South Africa – Margo Fargo
Darling of the Press	Guam – Emma Sheedy
Goddess of Albay: 1st Runner-up; 2nd Runner-up	Portugal – Telma Madeira; Philippines – Celeste Cortesi; Slovenia – Danijela Burjan
Best in Terno: 1st Runner-up; 2nd Runner-up	Portugal – Telma Madeira; Philippines – Celeste Cortesi; Peru – Jessica Russo

=== Sponsor's Awards ===
Award	Delegate
Miss Brisa Marina	Dominican Republic – Gabriela Franceschini
Miss CBNC Choice Award	Spain – Carolina Jane de Ferreira
Miss Coral Bay Nickel Corporation Choice Award	Spain – Carolina Jane de Ferreira
Miss Earth JACMI	Mexico – Melissa Flores
Miss Ever Bilena	Indonesia - Ratu Vashti Annisa
Miss People's Choice City Ambassadress	Indonesia – Ratu Vashti Annisa
Miss Psalmstre New Placenta	Indonesia – Ratu Vashti Annisa; Brazil – Sayonara Veras; Mexico – Melissa Flores
Miss Pontefino Estates	Brazil – Sayonara Veras
Miss Pontefino Hotel	Puerto Rico – Krystal Xamairy
Miss Puerto Princesa Agutaya Club	South Africa – Margo Fargo
Miss Puerto Princesa Centro Hotel	Vietnam – Nguyễn Phương Khánh
Miss Robig Builders	Vietnam – Nguyễn Phương Khánh
Miss Ruj Beauty Care & Spa	Vietnam – Nguyễn Phương Khánh
Miss Sharp Award	Northern Ireland – Christie van Schalkwyk
Miss Sponsor of DV Boer Farm Ambassadress	Nepal – Priya Sigdel
Miss Sponsor of Facial Cleanse Ambassadress	Guam – Emma Sheedy
Miss Sponsor of Forever Living Ambassadress	Ghana – Belvy Naa
Miss Sponsor of Infinity Closet	Peru – Jessica Russo
Miss Wellness Lumiere Skin & Spa	Spain – Carolina Jane de Ferreira
Miss Visit Laus Auto Group	Spain – Carolina Jane de Ferreira
Miss Junca Beauty 2018	England – Abbey-Anne Gyles-Brown

== Contestants ==
87 contestants competed for the title.

Country/Territory	Contestant	Age	Hometown	Group
Argentina	Dolores Cardoso	23	Arrecifes	FIRE
Armenia	Sona Danielyan	22	Yerevan	FIRE
Australia	Monique Shippen	25	Sydney	FIRE
Austria	Melanie Mader	26	Vienna	WATER
(The Bahamas) Bahamas	Samia Lauryn McClain	18	Nassau	WATER
Belarus	Anastasia Schipanova	26	Minsk	AIR
Belgium	Faye Bulcke	21	Zonnebeke	AIR
Belize	Renae Martinez	21	Belize City	AIR
Bolivia	Karen Quispe	20	Bermejo	FIRE
Bosnia and Herzegovina	Nađa Pepić	18	Banja Luka	WATER
Brazil	Sayonara Veras	25	Olinda	WATER
Cambodia	Keo Senglyhour	20	Phnom Penh	WATER
Cameroon	Audrey Monkam	23	Buea	AIR
Chile	Antonia Figueroa	23	La Serena	AIR
China	Guo Yameng	21	Beijing	WATER
Colombia	Valeria Ayos	24	Cartagena	AIR
Costa Rica	Arianna Medrano	19	Puntarenas	AIR
Crimea	Ksenia Sarina	25	Simferopol	AIR
Croatia	Michelle Korenić	20	Zagreb	WATER
Cuba	Monica Aguilar	19	Camagüey	AIR
Curaçao	Alexandra Atalita	24	Willemstad	FIRE
Cyprus	María Armenáki	18	Ayia Napa	WATER
Czech Republic	Tereza Křivánková	24	Prague	FIRE
Denmark	Kamilla Bang	19	Horsens	FIRE
Dominican Republic	Gabriela Franceschini	26	Santo Domingo	FIRE
Ecuador	Diana Valdivieso	20	Portoviejo	WATER
Egypt	Lamia Fathi	24	Cairo	WATER
England	Abbey-Anne Gyles-Brown	20	Northampton	AIR
France	Allison Dernard	25	Marseille	AIR
Germany	Maren Tschinkel	20	Ravensburg	FIRE
Ghana	Belvy Naa	25	Accra	AIR
Greece	Chrysa Androutsopoulou	24	Patras	FIRE
Guadeloupe	Orlane Dorocant	20	Gourbeyre	WATER
Guam	Emma Sheedy	18	Yigo	AIR
Guatemala	Lisa Hayet	24	Mixco	WATER
Guyana	Xamiera Kippins	23	Georgetown	WATER
Haiti	Falance Benjamin	26	Port-au-Prince	AIR
Honduras	Diana Palma	21	Danlí	FIRE
Hungary	Réka Lukács	25	Budapest	AIR
India	Nishi Bhardwaj	23	New Delhi	AIR
Indonesia	Ratu Vashti Annisa	23	Tangerang	WATER
(Republic of Ireland) Ireland	Sarah Carr	24	Downings	AIR
Israel	Dana Zreik	20	Olesh	WATER
Italy	Sofia Pavan	19	Padua	WATER
Japan	Mio Tanaka	24	Komatsu	AIR
Liberia	Joicet Jartu Foday	23	Monrovia	WATER
Malaysia	Jasmine Yeo	25	Kuching	FIRE
Malta	Yanika Azzopardi	22	Mosta	WATER
Mauritius	Kirty Sujeewon	26	Fond du Sac	AIR
Mexico	Melissa Flores	20	Venustiano Carranza	WATER
Moldova	Dumitrița Izbișciuc	18	Chișinău	AIR
Montenegro	Katarina Šećković	24	Bijelo Polje	FIRE
Myanmar	Chaw Yupar Thet	24	Yangon	AIR
Nepal	Priya Sigdel	23	Kathmandu	FIRE
Netherlands	Margaretha de Jong	21	Tytsjerksteradiel	FIRE
New Zealand	Jzayla Hughey	22	Auckland	WATER
Nigeria	Maristella Okpala	25	Enugu	FIRE
Northern Ireland	Christie van Schalkwyk	24	Carrickfergus	WATER
Panama	Diana Lemos	20	La Chorrera	FIRE
Paraguay	Larissa Domínguez	22	Asunción	WATER
Peru	Jessica Russo	22	Lima	AIR
Philippines	Celeste Cortesi	20	Pasay	AIR
Poland	Aleksandra Grysz	22	Kraków	FIRE
Portugal	Telma Madeira	18	Porto	AIR
Puerto Rico	Krystal Xamairy	18	Arecibo	WATER
Réunion	Alexia Aupin	18	Saint-Joseph	WATER
Romania	Denisse Andor	23	Bistrița	FIRE
Russia	Daria Kartyshova	24	Nizhny Novgorod	FIRE
Rwanda	Anastasie Umutoniwase	19	Kigali	FIRE
Samoa	Rebecca Sang-Yum	20	Apia	AIR
Serbia	Nina Jovanović	18	Požarevac	WATER
Sierra Leone	Alma Nancy Sesa	19	Port Loko	FIRE
Singapore	Kara Dong	19	Singapore City	FIRE
Slovenia	Danijela Burjan	22	Zreče	AIR
South Africa	Margo Fargo	26	Heidedal	FIRE
South Korea	Su-hyun Song	25	Daegu	FIRE
Spain	Carolina Jane de Ferreira	22	Cantabria	FIRE
Sri Lanka	Nathasha Fernando	21	Matara	WATER
Sweden	Yasmine Mindru	19	Gothenburg	FIRE
Thailand	Nirada Chetsadapriyakun	26	Amnat Charoen	FIRE
Tonga	Maria Otulao Aholelei	21	Nukuʻalofa	WATER
Trinidad and Tobago	Afeya Jeffrey	26	Point Fortin	AIR
Ukraine	Anastasiia Kryvokhyzha	23	Kyiv	WATER
United States	Yashvi Aware	25	College Park	FIRE
Venezuela	Diana Silva	21	Caracas	FIRE
Vietnam	Nguyễn Phương Khánh	23	Bến Tre	WATER
Zambia	Margret Konie	21	Lusaka	AIR

== Notes ==
=== Debuts ===
- Montenegro

=== Returns ===
- Last competed in 2008:
  - Liberia
- Last competed in 2009:
  - Cuba
  - Greece
- Last competed in 2014:
  - Curaçao
  - Guyana
- Last competed in 2015:
  - Armenia
  - Egypt
  - Germany
  - Ireland
  - Trinidad and Tobago
- Last competed in 2016:
  - Guam
  - Haiti
  - Romania
  - South Africa

=== Replacements ===
- Belgium – Faye Bulcke was appointed Miss Earth Belgium 2018 by Ken Stevens (national director of Miss Earth Belgium) as a replacement to Mayke Aendekerk, who cannot compete to the pageant for personal reasons. Bulcke was crowned 2nd runner-up at the Miss Exclusive 2016 pageant. The winner of Miss Exclusive pageant usually competes at Miss Earth.
- Bolivia – Karen Jenifer Quispe Nava was appointed Miss Earth Bolivia 2018 by Promociones Gloria as a replacement to Ilssen Olmos Ferrufino, who was reportedly rejected by Miss Earth Organization for not meeting the age requirements of the pageant. Quispe was crowned Virreina Miss World Bolivia 2018. Olmos will compete in Miss Supranational 2018 pageant instead.
- India – Nishi Bharadwaj has been appointed as Miss Earth India 2018 by Glamanand Supermodel India Organization as a replacement to the original title holder of Miss Earth India 2018 Devika Vaid. The original winner suffered with an injury making her unable to compete at the forthcoming Miss Earth 2018.

=== Designations ===
- South Africa – Margo Fargo was appointed as Miss Earth South Africa 2018. The appointment was due to conflict of schedules with Miss Earth South Africa 2018 pageant and the Miss Earth 2018 pageant arrival. Fargo previously worked as Miss Earth South Africa Ambassador in 2014 and recently competed for Miss South Africa 2018, where she placed in the Top 12.
- Thailand – Nirada Chetsadapriyakun was appointed as Miss Earth Thailand 2018 by Pawina Bumrungrot, National Director of ERM Marketing Co., Ltd., Thailand. Nirada was the 2nd Runner-up of Miss All Nations Thailand 2017.

=== Withdrawals ===
During the contest

- Canada – Jaime Vandenberg participated in some the preliminary activities in Manila but she decided to withdraw before the coronation night after accusing one of the Filipino food sponsors of sexual harassment during a dinner at the Manila Yacht Club.
- Lebanon – Salwa Akar was dethroned the title "Miss Earth Lebanon 2018" by the Miss Lebanon Organization after her photo with Miss Israel appeared in the media. She returned to her hometown afterwards.

Before the contest

- Angola
- Cook Islands
- Ethiopia
- Kyrgyzstan
- Mongolia
- Pakistan
- Switzerland
- Taiwan
- Uganda
- United States Virgin Islands
- Wales

== Controversies ==
=== Lebanon and Israel conflict ===
Miss Lebanon 2018, Salwa Akar received international press attention when she was stripped of her title in Lebanon, while participating in Miss Earth 2018 pageant after she posted a photo in Facebook with her arm around Miss Israel's Dana Zreik and making peace signs. Lebanon and Israel are in a long-standing state of war. As a result, she was unable to continue her participation in the Miss Earth pageant. In a press release, Israel's Prime Minister Benjamin Netanyahu’s spokesman Ofir Gendelman reacted on Akar’s dethronement and condemned the "Lebanese apartheid."

=== Sexual harassment allegations ===
On November 7–8, 2018, Jaime Vandenberg of Canada, Abbey-Anne Gyles-Brown of England, and Emma Sheedy of Guam accused one of the Filipino food sponsors of sexual harassment during a dinner at the Manila Yacht Club, claiming that he asked them for sexual favors in exchange for the crown or an advancement in the pageant. Sheedy had identified the sponsor as Amado S. Cruz, who is president of a car rental company and CEO of a construction company. The Manila Yacht Club officials clarified that Cruz is not a member and could have just been sponsored by another member. The pageant officials indicated that Cruz was not one of the major sponsors of the pageant and just sponsored for an evening meal.

Vandenberg withdrew from competition after Cruz obtained her mobile number without her consent and kept calling her for her hotel and room number. The pageant officials stated that they did not know how Cruz obtained her number, and they only have the delegates' international contact numbers and the pageant's mode of communication was through messenger and group chat only.

Vandenberg also claimed the organizers confiscated her passport on the first day of competition. The pageant organizers denied Vandenberg's claim, stating that delegates are free to keep their passports by signing a waiver and they only keep the passports for safekeeping since there had been many occasions of misplacing or losing their passports and to facilitate check-in for their domestic flights and hotel accommodations.

Vandenberg also said that seven candidates left the dinner and accompanied by the team managers to sit on the bus after feeling uncomfortable with the sponsor. All three candidates voiced their complaints to organizer Lorraine Schuck, but despite Schuck's assurance that Cruz would not be allowed near the candidates, he still appeared in the pageant. Schuck then stated that she does not have any authority in public places, such as the hotels where the delegates stayed and the Mall of Asia Arena where the grand final of the pageant took place since the pageant was a public event. Furthermore, Schuck said that all the delegates had police escorts for their safety. Schuck subsequently announced that Cruz is 'forever banned' from Miss Earth.

On November 9, 2018, Cruz denied the accusations of the three candidates. In addition, Monica Aguilar of Cuba claimed there were no instances of sexual harassment during the competition. Instead, she stated that the sponsor asked only if they wished to extend their visas to proceed to Boracay after the pageant, and she further stated that "no one was promised to get us further in the competition through 'sexual favors."

On November 10, 2018, Schuck's company Carousel Productions Inc. urged other candidates to come forward if they experienced any incidents of sexual harassment during the pageant. The organizer also expressed support to the delegates in case they decide to take any further action to the alleged perpetrator.

== Crossovers ==
Contestants who previously competed or will be competing at other international beauty pageants:

Miss Universe

- 2021: Colombia: Valeria Ayos (Top 5)
- 2021: Chile: Antonia Figueroa (Unplaced)
- 2021: Nigeria: Maristella Okpala (Unplaced), Best National Costume
- 2022: Philippines: Celeste Cortesi (Unplaced)
- 2022: Portugal: Telma Madeira (Top 16)
- 2023: Mexico: Melissa Flores (Unplaced)
- 2023: Venezuela: Diana Silva (Top 10)

Miss World

- 2016: Chile: Antonia Figueroa (Unplaced)
- 2017: Belize: Renae Martinez (Unplaced)

Miss International

- 2019: Australia: Monique Shippen (Unplaced)

Miss Grand International

- 2023: Romania: Denisse Andor (Unplaced)

Miss Asia Pacific International

- 2018: Armenia: Sona Danielyan (Unplaced)

Top Model of the World

- 2017: Germany: Maren Tschinkel (Unplaced)

Reinado Internacional Del Café

- 2018: Argentina: Dolores Cardoso (Unplaced)

Miss Grand Mar Universe

- 2016: Malta: Yanika Azzopardi (Top 5)

Miss City Tourism World

- 2017: Venezuela: Diana Silva (Winner)

Miss Black San International Queen

- 2017: Guyana: Xamiera Kippins (Winner)

Miss Tourism America

- 2014: Paraguay: Larissa Dominguez (Winner)

== Broadcasters ==
Broadcasters	Coverage
Facebook Live	Livestream on the official Facebook page of Miss Earth Organization.
FOX Life	Live broadcast in Australia, China, Hong Kong, India, Indonesia, Japan, Malaysia, New Zealand, Philippines, Singapore, Taiwan, Thailand, and Vietnam.
GMA Network	Livestream on the official YouTube Channel of GMA Network and delayed telecast (November 4, 2018) in the Philippines.
Globovisión	Broadcast in Venezuela and through DirecTV cable channels in Argentina, Aruba, Barbados, Chile, Colombia, Curaçao, Ecuador, Peru, Puerto Rico, Trinidad and Tobago, and Uruguay.
Hong Kong Cable Television	Broadcast in Hong Kong.
MVS Comunicaciones	Broadcast in Central and South America, Canada, the Caribbean, Mexico, and the United States.
Telecaribe	Broadcast in Colombia.
Telemicro	Broadcast in Dominican Republic.
SCCN Channel 17	Broadcast in Suriname.
ZAP TV	Broadcast in Angola and Mozambique.
