= Karen Ibasco =

Filipina physicist and beauty queen

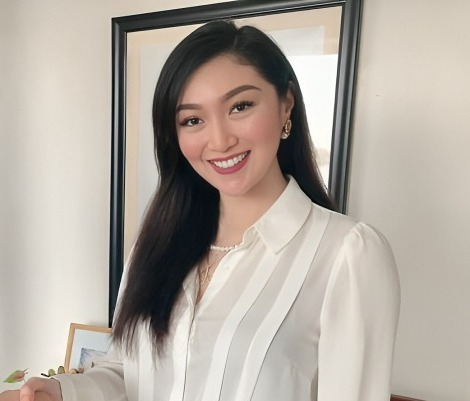
- Ibasco in 2019
- Born: Karen Santos Ibasco; December 17, 1990 (age 35); Manila, Philippines
- Education: University of Santo Tomas
- Occupation: Medical Physicist
- Height: 1.75 m (5 ft 9 in)
- Beauty pageant titleholder
- Title: Miss Philippines Earth 2017; Miss Earth 2017
- Years active: 2016–present
- Eye color: Brown
- Major competitions: Binibining Pilipinas 2016; (Unplaced); Miss Philippines Earth 2017; (Winner); Miss Earth 2017; (Winner)

Karen Santos Ibasco (Tagalog pronunciation: [ɪˈbɐskɔ]; born December 17, 1990) is a Filipina physicist and beauty pageant titleholder who was crowned Miss Philippines Earth 2017. She represented the Philippines at the Miss Earth 2017 pageant and won the title.

== Early life and education ==
Karen Santos Ibasco was born on December 17, 1990, in Manila, Philippines. She is half-Filipino, half-Chinese. She studied at Hope Christian High School in Manila and she speaks Chinese fluently. She obtained her bachelor's degree in applied physics majoring in instrumentation. She also has a master's degree in applied physics, majoring in medical physics at the University of Santo Tomas in the Philippines, where she graduated cum laude on both degrees. She was also a former college instructor at the College of Science of the University of Santo Tomas and worked as a medical physicist at St. Luke's Medical Center, Global City.

== Pageantry ==
=== Binibining Pilipinas ===
Ibasco was a candidate at the Binibining Pilipinas 2016 pageant and represented the city of Manila.

=== Miss Philippines Earth ===
Ibasco entered and won the Miss Philippines Earth pageant 2017, on July 15, 2017, at the Mall of Asia Arena in Pasay. During the hashtag, candidates drew from a fishbowl a topic to expound upon, Karen's hashtag was #fake news. She said:

Nowadays, a lot of people distribute fake news but one of the most important mediums is social media. We have to learn [how] to use it for social good. We have to learn to disseminate…and also to filter the right information not just for yourself but also for the people in your circle of influence.

During the question and answer section of the top five finalists, she was asked what she wanted to change about the environmental policies of the country. She responded:

Everyone is experiencing climate change. I’m just grateful that the Philippines has signed the Paris Treaty. What I want to see is to pass a carbon tax. In that way, we would invest in renewable energy to help our world to be a better place, greener, inhabitable for the whole country.

As the winner, she went on to represent the Philippines at Miss Earth 2017.

=== Miss Earth 2017 ===
Ibasco entered and won Miss Earth 2017, on November 4, 2017, at The Mall of Asia Arena, Manila, Philippines. She was crowned as Miss Earth 2017 by the outgoing Miss Earth 2016 Katherine Espín of Ecuador. She is the 4th Filipina to win the Miss Earth crown and the 3rd in the last four years.

During the hashtag segment, the top eight finalists were given 30 seconds to express their thoughts on a hashtag that they picked out of a bowl. Karen's hashtag was #biodiversity. She said:

Biodiversity is very important. We are very known in the Philippines to have a lot of biodiversity, and they're very important because they also balances the ecosystem. It's very important for us to protect them, because as we protect them, we protect the environment to help save our home, our planet, our Earth, to be a better place to live in. Thank you.

During the final question and answer portion, the top four contestants were asked by the host James Deakin: "Who or what do you think is the biggest enemy of Mother Earth and why?" She answered:

I believe that the real problem in this world is not climate change. The real problem is us because of our ignorance and apathy. What we have to do is to start changing our ways, to start recalibrating our minds and redirecting our steps because together, as a global community, our micro-efforts will have a macro-effect to help save our home, our planet.

Ibasco was personally congratulated by former Philippine president and Manila Mayor Joseph Estrada when she paid a courtesy call on Estrada at the latter's office in Manila City Hall. She was also congratulated by former Manila City Mayor and Buhay Party-List, Lito Atienza for giving pride and honor to the City of Manila in winning Miss Earth 2017.

== Accolades and commendations ==
=== Senate of the Philippines ===
The 17th Congress of the Senate of the Philippines through the Philippine Senate Resolution Number 539 authored by Philippine Senator Sonny Angara commended Ibasco on November 7, 2017, for being crowned as Miss Earth 2017. In a separate Senate, Resolution Number 544 was filed on November 20, 2017, to recognize and commend Ibasco for honoring the Philippines in winning the Miss Earth 2017 pageant was authored by Senator Joel Villanueva. The Resolution indicated that "the Filipina beauty queen’s positive and strong determination to fulfill her dream of winning the title is indeed a positive example and great inspiration to her countrymen, particularly the youth, that no dream is impossible as long as she puts her heart and mind to it; Resolve by the Senate, that the Senate of the Philippines recognizes and commends Karen Ibasco on her victory at the Miss Earth 2017, and extends its warmest gratitude for bringing pride and glory to all Filipino citizens."

=== House of Representatives of the Philippines ===
The Lower House of the seventeenth Philippines Congress, House of Representatives of the Philippines also had two separate House Resolutions commending and conferring the "Congressional Medal of Distinction" to Ibasco for her victory in the Miss Earth 2017 pageant through the House Resolution Number 1438 authored by Congressman Eric L. Olivarez on November 6, 2017 and House Resolution 1465 authored by Congressman Yul Servo on November 21, 2017. “The House Resolution stated “As the reigning Miss Earth 2017, Ibasco will serve as the ambassador to environmental protection campaigns worldwide, influencing millions of people and creating a huge effect to the preservation of our Mother Earth for future generations. By being crowned Miss Earth, she made the country proud and has shown to the world the true meaning of Filipino beauty, excellence and love for the environment. Her beauty is truly a beauty for a cause.”

=== Woman of the Year ===
In May 2018, Ibasco was one of the recipients of Philippines The Outstanding Men and Women of the Year awards for her contributions to society and the country, as well as her active pursuit of her environmental advocacies. The event was held at the Teatrino Promenade in Greenhills, San Juan, Metro Manila where she also won the Face of the Year special award.

=== Toast award ===
The University of Santo Tomas College of Science Alumni Association recognized Ibasco as a notable graduate in the Thomasian Outstanding Alumni Scientists Tribute Awards on March 2, 2019, for her environmental advocacies and in recognition of her significant and exemplary contribution to the science community and the nation.

== Media and environmental activism ==
In August 2017, Ibasco was invited in the Senate of the Philippines and voiced her support for the fuel excise tax provision at one of the hearings conducted by the Senate ways and means committee on the proposed Tax Reform for Acceleration and Inclusion Act (TRAIN). She indicated in the hearing that "as a signatory to the Paris climate change treaty that aims to reduce greenhouse gas emissions, the Philippine is committed within a specific timeframe to cut its carbon emissions, which can be done partly by approving the fuel excise tax provision under TRAIN."

Ibasco went to Cambodia in November 2017 and took part with the environmental and social activities such as school tours, tree planting and visited historical landmarks Angkor Wat and Siem Reap.

She joined a climate change conference on December 7, 2017, where she delivered a welcome message at the first Kasugbong Kalibutan International Climate Change Conference in Catbalogan, Samar.

She traveled to Vietnam in January 2018 to grace a fashion event together with Miss Earth Vietnam 2010 Lưu Thị Diễm Hương and supermodel Võ Hoàng Yến which was organized by fashion designer, Tuyet Le. She was also the guest of honor in the opening of Shira Clinic and Spa in Hanoi.

During her reign, she collaborated in the Philippines with the Conservation for Ocean Resources and Aquatic Life (CORAL), a non-governmental organization to plant corals in the oceans, worked with Plastic Solutions to reduce the consumption of plastic, conducted school tours to educate children about the environment and promoted the use of solar power.

In June 2018, she went to Mexico to attend social and environmental activities of the Miss Earth Mexico pageant. She was accompanied by Miss Water 2017, Juliana Franco of Colombia. Ibasco proceeded to Reunion Islands together with Miss Earth Fire 2018 Lada Akimova of Russia and served as a guest speakers at the very first Environmental Conference in Réunion Island and visited the city of Saint-Pierre to raise ecological awareness through school tours where they educated children on the daily actions in favor of the environment, spearheaded the planting of more than 1000 trees in the Saint-Pierre territory with the introduction of various endemic species.

In July 2018, she led the tree planting activity in Balasan, Iloilo called "One Thousand Trees for the Future, A Tree Planting Activity" in coordination with The Open Arms for Children, Inc and the Philippine Department of Environment and Natural Resources. She also participated in the opening of the two-day Bataan Environment Summit 2018, which tackled Bataan's environmental conservation and protection achievements.

She traveled to Singapore in August 2018 as special guest for the Miss Earth Singapore 2018 pageant in which she crowned Kara Dong at the Grand Ballroom of One Farrer Hotel on August 3, 2018. She then proceeded to Bogotá, Colombia to attend the Miss Earth Colombia and crowned Valeria Maria Ayos Bossa as Miss Earth Colombia 2018 on August 26, 2018, and then traveled to Belgium and met with the Philippine ambassador in Brussels and talked about the diplomatic relations between the Philippines and Belgium.

She appeared in the cover page of an American monthly women's fashion magazine Harper's Bazaar- Vietnam edition in March 2018 and wore the 2018 collection of Vietnamese fashion designer Tuyet Le.

In addition to her numerous trips around Philippines, during her reign as Miss Earth, Ibasco had traveled to Cambodia, Vietnam, Mexico, Réunion Island, Singapore, Colombia and Belgium.

After winning Miss Earth 2017, she continued with her environmental advocacies and participated in climate change conferences, conducted environmental talks, educated students internationally and joined the American media organization, TEDx as an environmental speaker. She collaborated with the Conservation of Ocean's Resources and Aquatic Life (CORAL) to promote ocean conservation by planting corals in the seabed. She joined another non-governmental organization, Plastic Solutions in 2019 to promote reusable building blocks, ecobricks made from waste plastic bottle packed with used plastics and advocated the single-use plastic ban to save oceans. She was also chosen as an ambassador of international non-governmental organization, World Wide Fund for Nature in 2019 that works in the field of wilderness preservation and the reduction of human impact on the environment.

Ibasco was appointed as the Climate Change Commission's Youth Ambassador in the Philippines in 2019 and was sent as one of the representatives of the Philippines in the 2019 UN Climate Action Summit which aims to bring the countries closer to meeting the goals of the Paris agreement which was held at the headquarters of the United Nations in New York City on September 23, 2019. As a youth ambassador of the Climate Change Commission, she focused on "Gender and Climate Change".

She served as the muse of Myanmar delegates in the opening ceremony of the 2019 Southeast Asian Games held at the Philippine Arena in the Philippines on November 30, 2019.

Ibasco was selected to join the virtual United Nations event during the speech of Secretary-General of the United Nations António Guterres which was held at Columbia University in New York City in December 2020.

In December 2020, she was designated as the ambassador for R.E.START Renewable Energy Transition to promote energy conservation and to raise awareness on renewable energy transition.

Awards and achievements
Preceded by (Ecuador) Katherine Espín	Miss Earth; 2017	Succeeded by (Vietnam) Nguyễn Phương Khánh
Preceded by Loren Artajos (Assumed) (Laoag)	Miss Philippines Earth; 2017	Succeeded by Celeste Cortesi (Rome, Italy via oversea representation)
