= Mexicana Universal Michoacán =

Beauty contest

- Formation: 1994 (as Nuestra Belleza Michoacán); 2017 (as Mexicana Universal Michoacán)
- Type: Beauty pageant
- Headquarters: Morelia
- Location: Mexico
- Local coordinator: Magdalena Chiprés

Mexicana Universal Michoacán (until 2016 called Nuestra Belleza Michoacán) is a state-level contest in the state of Michoacán, Mexico, which selects the state representative for the national contest Mexicana Universal (formerly called Nuestra Belleza México), thus aspiring to represent the country internationally on one of the platforms offered.

The state organization has achieved the following results since 1994:

- Winner: 1 (2022)
- Top 10/11/12: 5 (2004, 2006, 2015, 2023, 2025)
- Top 15/16: 1 (2010)
- Top 20/21: 2 (2003, 2018)
- Unplaced: 20 (1994, 1995, 1996, 1997, 1998, 1999, 2000, 2001, 2002, 2005, 2007, 2008, 2009, 2011, 2012, 2013, 2014, 2016, 2019, 2021)
- Absences: 2 (2000, 2001)

== National Queens ==
- Paulina Uceda - MGI All Stars México 2026 (Designated)
- Melissa Flores - Mexicana Universal 2023
- Magdalena Chiprés - Reina Hispanoamericana México 2016 (Designated)

== Titleholders ==
The following are the names of the annual winners of Mexicana Universal Michoacán, listed in ascending order, as well as their results during the national Mexicana Universal pageant. State queens who represented the country in a current or past franchise of the national organization are also highlighted in a specific color.

Current Franchises:

- Competed at Miss Grand International.
- Competed at Miss International.
- Competed at Miss Charm.
- Competed at Reina Hispanoamericana.
- Competed at Miss Orb International.
- Competed at Nuestra Latinoamericana Universal.

Former Franchises:

- Competed at Miss Universe.
- Competed at Miss World.
- Competed at Miss Continente Americano.
- Competed at Miss Costa Maya International.
- Competed at Miss Atlántico Internacional.
- Competed at Miss Verano Viña del Mar.
- Competed at Reina Internacional del Café.
- Competed at Reina Internacional de las Flores.
- Competed at Señorita Continente Americano.
- Competed at Nuestra Belleza Internacional.

| Year | Titleholder | Hometown | Placement | Special Award | Notes |
|---|---|---|---|---|---|
| 2025 | Paulina Uceda Escorcia | Uruapan | Top 12 | - | Will compete at MGI All Stars 2026 (2nd Edition); MGI All Stars México 2026; 2nd Runner-up at Miss México 2025; Miss Michoacán 2025; 1st Runner-up at Miss Intercontinental 2021; Miss Intercontinental México 2020; Miss Model of the Universe México 2020; Miss All Nations México 2019; Competed at Mexicana Universal Hidalgo 2018; Miss Intercontinental Michoacán 2017 |
| 2024 | In 2024, due to changes in the dates of the national pageant, the election of the state queens was postponed for one year. | | | | |
| 2023 | Ana Laura Vega Oropeza; Resigned from her state title due to the postponement of the national pageant. | Zamora | Did not Compete | - | Competed at Mexicana Universal Michoacán 2022; Miss Michoacán 2020 |
| 2023 | Patricia Rodríguez Orozco (Assumed) | Jacona | Top 10 | Multimedia Award | 1st Runner-up at Mexicana Universal Michoacán 2019 |
| 2022 | Melissa Flores Godínez | San Pedro Cahro | Mexicana Universal | - | Competed at Miss Universe 2023; Miss Earth-Fire 2018; Miss Earth México 2018; Miss Earth Michoacán 2018 |
| 2021 | María Guadalupe Barragán Ayala | Lázaro Cárdenas | - | - | 1st Runner-up at Mexicana Universal Michoacán 2018 |
| 2020 | In 2020, due to the contingency of COVID-19 there was a lag in the year of the state contest | | | | |
| 2019 | Adriana Zacarías Avilés | Morelia | - | - | - |
| 2018 | Diana Martínez Lagunas | Nueva Italia | Top 20 | - | Competed at Mexicana Universal Michoacán 2017; Competed at Reina Expo Feria Michoacán 2014 |
| 2017 | Leslie González Villagómez | Apatzingán | Top 10 | - | 1st Runner-up at Miss All Nations 2019; Miss All Nations México 2019; Reina Expo Fiesta Michoacán 2016 |
Until 2016 the Title was Nuestra Belleza Michoacán
| 2016 | Renata Padilla Espinoza | Lázaro Cárdenas | - | - | - |
| 2015 | Magdalena Chiprés Herrera | Zamora | Top 10 | Academic Awards | Virreina Hispanoamericana 2016; Reina Hispanoamericana México 2016; Reina Expo Feria Michoacán 2014 |
| 2014 | Michelle Anaid Garibay Cocco | Morelia | - | - | 3rd Runner-up at World Miss University 2018; Miss Mundo Universidad México 2018 |
| 2013 | Británia Méndez Castellanos | Apatzingán | - | - | - |
| 2012 | Sofía Chávez Castillo | Jacona | - | - | - |
| 2011 | Edna Paola Álvarez Madriz | Nueva Italia | - | - | Señorita COBAEM 2011 |
| 2010 | Karla Paulina Gutiérrez García | Morelia | Top 15 | - | Top 5 at Rostro de México 2015; Miss Grand Distrito Federal 2015; 2nd Runner-up at Reina Mundial del Banano 2012; Reina del Banano México 2012; Competed at Miss Gaming International 2012; Miss Gaming México 2012; Competed at Miss Tourism Queen International 2011; Miss Tourism Queen México 2011 |
| 2009 | Itzel Viridiana García Rojas | Apatzingán | - | - | Reina Expo Feria Michoacán 2008 |
| 2008 | Alexis Navarro Gutiérrez | Morelia | - | - | - |
| 2007 | Yasamin Samiei Vela | Morelia | - | - | - |
| 2006 | Tania Vanessa Rincón Sánchez | La Piedad | Top 10 | Academic Award | - |
| 2005 | Ángela Vanessa Paredes Soto | Huetamo | - | - | 1st Runner-up at Señorita Michoacán 2004 |
| 2004 | Elizabeth Cortés Orozco | Apatzingán | Top 10 | - | - |
| 2003 | Yaminah Márquez Pérez | Yurécuaro | Top 20 | - | - |
| 2002 | Angélica Navarrete Higareda | Sahuayo | - | - | - |
| 2001 | No candidate was sent | | | | |
| 2000 | No candidate was sent | | | | |
| 1999 | María Elena Duarte Ramírez | Morelia | - | - | - |
| 1998 | Giovanna Páramo Garduño | Morelia | - | - | - |
| 1997 | María de Lourdes Romero Orozco | Apatzingán | - | - | - |
| 1996 | Verónica Martínez Pérez | Apatzingán | - | - | - |
| 1995 | Erika Martínez Cardenas | Morelia | - | - | - |
| 1994 | María Nohemí Acuña Avilés | Morelia | - | - | - |

== See also ==
- Miss Michoacán
