= Miss Philippines Earth 2017 =

17th Miss Philippines Earth pageant

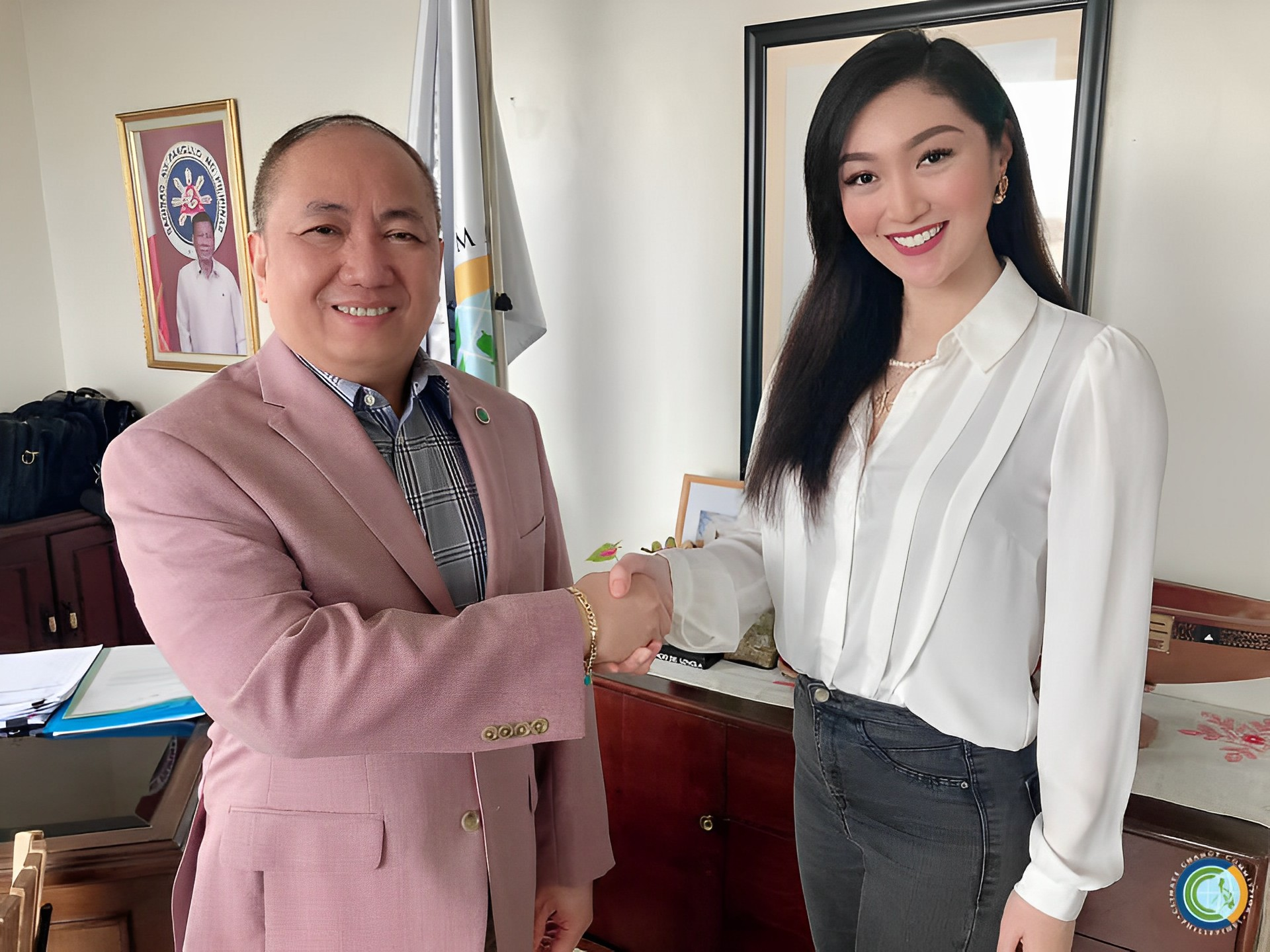
- Karen Ibasco, Miss Philippines Earth 2017
- Date: July 15, 2017
- Presenters: Robi Domingo; Sandra Seifert; Cathy Untalan; Jamie Herrell
- Venue: SM Mall of Asia Arena, Pasay, Metro Manila
- Broadcaster: ABS-CBN
- Entrants: 40
- Placements: 10
- Winner: Karen Ibasco; Manila

Miss Philippines Earth 2017 was the 17th edition of the Miss Philippines Earth pageant, held at the SM Mall of Asia Arena in Pasay, Metro Manila, on July 15, 2017.

Loren Mar Artajos of Laoag crowned Karen Ibasco of Manila as her successor at the end of the event. Ibasco represented the Philippines at Miss Earth 2017 and won.

== Results ==
=== Placements ===
Placement	Contestant
Miss Philippines Earth 2017	Manila – Karen Ibasco
Miss Philippines Air 2017	Olongapo – Kim de Guzman
Miss Philippines Water 2017	Caloocan – Jessica Marasigan
Miss Philippines Fire 2017	Villanueva – Nellza Bautista
Miss Philippines Eco Tourism 2017	Lobo – Vanessa Mae Castillo
Runners-Up	Angeles – Korin Frances Dizon; Lipa – Rianne Charlotte Kalaw; New Zealand – Jessica Rose McEwen; Panglao – Catherine Tabaniag; Porac – Anne Krishia Antonio

== Category Results ==
- Top 15 scorers of each preliminary rounds

Beauty of Figure and Form	Beauty of Poise and Personality	Beauty of Face	Intelligence and Environmental Awareness
Cagayan de Oro	Olongapo	Caloocan	Manila
New Zealand	Lobo, Batangas	Magsaysay, Misamis Oriental	Parañaque
Tayabas	Caloocan	Lobo, Batangas	San Miguel, Bulacan
Manila	Dauin, Negros Oriental	Olongapo	Panglao, Bohol
Dauin, Negros Oriental	Magsaysay, Misamis Oriental	Camiling, Tarlac	Pasay
Ozamiz, Misamis Occidental	Puerto Princesa	Lipa	Tayabas
Olongapo	New Zealand	Ozamiz	Taguig
Puerto Princesa	Villanueva, Misamis Oriental	Marikina	Lobo, Batangas
Mandaluyong	Marikina	New Zealand	Olongapo
Kalibo, Aklan	Ozamiz, Misamis Occidental	Manila	New Zealand
Villanueva, Misamis Oriental	Marilao, Bulacan	Puerto Princesa, Palawan	Angeles City
Porac, Pampanga	Cagayan de Oro	Pulilan, Bulacan	Porac, Pampanga
Lipa	Porac, Pampanga	Panglao, Bohol	Lipa, Batangas
Angeles City	Manila	Cagayan de Oro	Dauin, Negros Oriental
Camiling, Tarlac	Pulilan, Bulacan	Porac, Pampanga	Ozamiz, Misamis Occidental

=== Special awards ===
Special Awards	#	Contestant	Representing
Best in Evening Gown		Sadrine Stoelzaed	Puerto Princesa
Best in Swimsuit		Sherlyn Doloriel	Cagayan de Oro
Miss Friendship		Madelle Estaya	Nueva Valencia, Guimaras
Miss Photogenic		Daniella Anthea Mayo	Quezon City
Best in Cultural Attire		Elizabeth Amahan	El Salvador, Misamis Oriental
Eco Warrior Award		Vanessa Mae Castillo	Lobo, Batangas
Best Eco Video		Adalynn Dumlao	Taguig
SM Markets Award		Marie Sherry Ann Tomes	Mandaluyong
Miss Talent		Jessica Rose McEwen	Filipino Comm of New Zealand
Miss Hannah's 2017	22	Marie Sherry Ann Tormes	Mandaluyong
Trash-to-Class Winner		Celine Mae Pangan	Ozamiz

== Contestants ==
40 contestants representing various cities, municipalities, provinces, and Filipino communities abroad competed for the title.

I & II - Northern and Central Luzon
No.	Contestant	Represented
1	Korin Frances Dizon	Angeles
2	Princess Nicolas	Tarlac
3	Agnes Mygelle Tolentino	Bulacan
4	Jessica Rose McEwen	Pampanga
5	Kim de Guzman	Olongapo
6	Anne Krishia Antonio	Porac
7	Samantha Viktoria Acosta	Pulilan, Bulacan
8	Allana Coronel	San Fernando
9	Abigail Libre	San Miguel

III, IV & V - Southern Tagalog, Bicol, and Mimaropa
No.	Contestant	Represented
10	Nikkie Maria Elizalde	Biñan
11	Mary Cheene Pastoral	Dasmariñas
12	Alexis Amor Nevalga	Laguna
13	Rianne Charlotte Kalaw	Lipa
14	Vanessa Mae Castillo	Batangas
15	Shaina Louise Kim	Lucena
16	Princess Pusing	Masbate City
17	Sadrine Stoelzaed	Palawan
18	Lea Audrey Laano	Quezon

Metro Manila (National Capital)
No.	Contestant	Represented
19	Jessica Marasigan	Caloocan
20	Kristal May Rubiano	Pasig
21	Rheena Rae Ferrer	Makati
22	Marie Sherry Ann Tormes	Mandaluyong
23	Karen Ibasco	Manila
24	Klaidel Hope Concepcion	Marikina
25	Sofia Jane Panapanaan	Parañaque
26	Tammy De Roca	Pasay
27	Daniella Anthea Mayo	Quezon City
28	Adalynn Dumlao	Taguig

VI, VII, VIII, XVIII - Eastern Visayas, Central Visayas, Western Visayas and Negros Island
No.	Contestant	Represented
29	Cheysen Capuno	Negros Oriental
30	May Adel Ahmed Salman	Aklan
31	Madelle Estaya	Guimaras
32	Catherine Tabaniag	Bohol
33	Vivian Wladkowski	Antique

IX, X, XI & XII - Northern and Southern Mindanao, Zamboanga and Bangsamoro
No.	Contestant	Represented
34	Sherlyn Doloriel	Camiguin
35	Elizabeth Amahan	El Salvador
36	Danna Rose Sacaoco	Magsaysay, Misamis Oriental
37	Carmella Quirog	Bukidnon
38	Pamela Grace Janson	Davao Oriental
39	Celine Mae Pangan	Misamis Occidental
40	Nellza Bautista	Villanueva
