= Melissa Flores =

Mexican beauty pageant titleholder

- Born: Melissa Flores Godínez; March 22, 1998 (age 28); Venustiano Carranza, Michoacán, Mexico
- Education: Contemporary University of the Americas
- Height: 1.82 m (6 ft 0 in)
- Beauty pageant titleholder
- Title: Miss Earth Michoacán 2018; Miss Earth México 2018; Mexicana Universal Michoacán 2023; Mexicana Universal 2023
- Major competitions: Miss Earth México 2018; (Winner); Miss Earth 2018; (Miss Earth–Fire); Mexicana Universal 2023; (Winner); Miss Universe 2023; (Unplaced)

Melissa Flores Godínez (born March 22, 1998) is a Mexican model and beauty pageant titleholder who was crowned Mexicana Universal. She represented Mexico at the Miss Universe 2023 pageant in El Salvador.

== Personal life ==
Flores was born on March 22, 1998, in Venustiano Carranza, Michoacán. She received a degree in psychology from the Contemporary University of the Americas and is currently pursuing a specialization in cosmetics.

She is currently Director of Culture and Tourism of the Government of Venustiano Carranza, where her role is to promote social, cultural and educational work.

== Pageantry ==
=== Miss Earth México 2018 ===
Flores joined and won Miss Earth México 2018, which took place at the Plaza Principal del Pez Vela in the city of Manzanillo, Colima, on 3 June 2018, representing the state of Michoacán.

=== Miss Earth 2018 ===
Flores represented Mexico at Miss Earth 2018 in the Mall of Asia Arena in Pasay, Philippines. She reached fourth place and won the title Miss Earth-Fire.

=== Miss Universe Mexico 2023 ===
On September 2, 2023, Flores represented the state of Michoacán in the fifth edition of Mexicana Universal 2023, where she became the first representative of Michoacán to become Miss Universe Mexico 2023.

=== Miss Universe 2023 ===
Flores represented Mexico at Miss Universe 2023. She was unplaced, with the winner being Sheynnis Palacios of Nicaragua.

Awards and achievements
Preceded by (Sonora) Irma Miranda	Mexicana Universal; 2023	Succeeded by (Hidalgo (state)) Montserrat Villalva
Preceded by Karla Ochoa	Mexicana Universal Michoacán; 2023	Succeeded by Ana Laura Vega
Preceded by (Russia) Lada Akimova	Miss Earth–Fire; 2018	Succeeded by (Belarus) Alisa Manyonok
Preceded by Karen Bustos	Miss Earth Mexico; 2018	Succeeded by Hilary Islas
