= Northampton College =

Coordinates: 52.2596°N 0.8481°W

Location
- Booth Lane (Main); Northampton, Northamptonshire, NN3 3RF; England

Information
- Type: College of further education
- Established: 1973
- Ofsted: Reports
- Principal: Jason Lancaster
- Staff: 600 (Full Time) 300 (Visiting Lectures)
- Gender: Mixed
- Age: 16+
- Enrolment: 11,000+
- Website: http://www.northamptoncollege.ac.uk

Northampton College is a further education college in Northampton, England, which opened in 1973, following building work which started in 1970.

The college's main campus is at Booth Lane which provides almost all courses offered, and later expanded to include its Daventry campus after merging with Daventry Tertiary College in August 2004, and its Lower Mounts campus after its facility in the town centre was extended in 2010. The Booth Lane campus has just undergone a massive redevelopment, reopening for study in 2012.

As of 2026, the current Student President is Sergiu Caranfil and the vice president is Alecia Mudawapi. They manage the NCSU (Northampton College Student Union).

The college is one of the largest further education colleges in the South Midlands, with around 7,000 full-time and part-time students.

== History ==
=== Booth Lane ===
Towards the end of the 1960s, the Northampton Borough Council Education Committee and Chief Education Officer, MJ Henley MA, identified the need for a new further education college in Northampton to complement the existing College of Technology and School of Art (now part of the Avenue campus of University of Northampton). The need arose from continuing pressure on the accommodation available at those establishments and the anticipated expansion of the population over the period 1971 to 1981.

The first phase of the building project began at the Booth Lane site in November 1970, completed in time to welcome new students in September 1972. The college was officially opened on 18 May 1973 by Lord Belstead, Parliamentary Under-Secretary of State for Education and Science. The second phase was completed in time for September 1974. Northampton College grew and saw the construction of other buildings to its complex at Booth Lane over the next few decades.

The Booth Lane site was completely re-developed between 2009 and 2012 following an £85m capital investment. The re-development was officially opened on 20 March 2012 by The Duke of York. The building now contains a library, study areas, computer suites, a professional theatre, underground sound recording booths and performance space, automotive spray booths, engineering studios, dance studios, photographic laboratories, TV and radio studios and a restaurant, which is open to the public.

=== Lower Mounts ===
The Lower Mounts site in Northampton town centre was officially opened on 6 July 2011, by Skills Minister John Hayes MP. This is the home of the College's hairdressing and beauty therapy programmes including The Salon NC which is open to the public, plus courses for adults including English for Speakers of Other Languages and help with basic skills in English, Maths and IT.

=== Daventry Campus ===
In addition, the college has a site at Badby Road West in Daventry where it provides a range of full-time and part-time courses for young people and adults.

== Partnerships ==
The college is part of the Northamptonshire Federation of Colleges and works closely with other education providers including Moulton College, the University of Northampton and Tresham College, and a number of secondary schools. Partnerships have also been established with the South East Midlands Enterprise Partnership, Northamptonshire County Council, the Northamptonshire Chamber of Commerce and other bodies to provide targeted initiatives for local needs.

== Notable people ==
- James Acaster, comedian
- Abbey-Anne Gyles, model
- Natalie Kassanga, musical theatre performer
- Slowthai, rapper
- Daniel Robert Middleton (DanTDM) , content creator
