= Hà Thu =

Vietnamese model and beauty pageant titleholder

Lê Thị Hà Thu
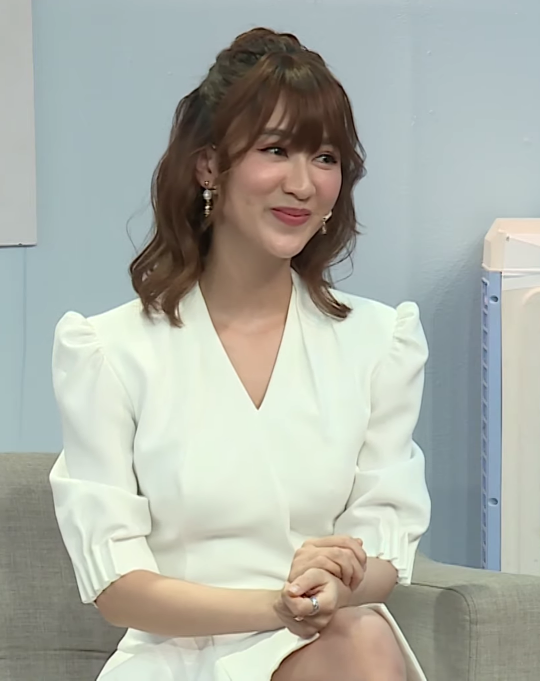
- Born: Lê Thị Hà Thu; July 21, 1992 (age 34); Thừa Thiên Huế Province, Vietnam
- Height: 1.67 m (5 ft 6 in)
- Beauty pageant titleholder
- Title: Miss Earth Vietnam 2017
- Hair color: Dark Brown
- Eye color: Brown
- Major competitions: Miss Ocean Vietnam 2014; (1st Runner-Up); Miss Intercontinental 2015; (Top 15); Miss Earth 2017; (Top 16); (Miss Photogenic)

Lê Thị Hà Thu (born 21 July 1992) is a Vietnamese model and beauty pageant titleholder who was appointed as Miss Earth Vietnam 2017. She represented Vietnam at Miss Earth 2017.

== Career ==
Thu was first runner-up in Miss Ocean Vietnam 2014. In 2015, she was Miss Intercontinental Vietnam and represented Vietnam at Miss Intercontinental 2015 where she reached Top 17.

She competed at Miss Earth 2017 in the Philippines reaching the top 16.

Awards and achievements
Preceded by Nguyễn Thị Lệ Nam Em	Miss Earth Vietnam; 2017	Succeeded by Nguyễn Phương Khánh
Preceded by (Wales) Charlotte Hitchman	Miss Earth Eco-Warrior; 2017	Succeeded by (Nigeria) Maristella Okpala
Preceded by (Vietnam) Nguyễn Thị Lệ Nam Em	Miss Earth Photogenic; 2017	Succeeded by (Bosnia and Herzegovina) Dajana Šnjegota
