= Miss Earth Japan =

Annual beauty contest held in Japan

- Formation: 2001; 25 years ago
- Type: Beauty pageant
- Headquarters: Tokyo
- Location: Japan
- Members: Miss Earth
- Official language: Japanese
- National Director: Osamu Sakata
- Website: miss-earth.com

Miss Earth Japan (Japanese: ミス・アース・ジャパン) is a beauty pageant held annually in Japan. The titleholder represents Japan in the international Miss Earth pageant.

== History ==
Miss Earth Japan, based in Shinjuku, Tokyo, is organized by IBG Japan (I Vesey Japan, Inc.) under its corporate name Miss Japan Institute of Earth General. The national director of the pageant is Osamu Sakata. The pageant was established to elect Japan's representative in the annual Miss Earth pageant, to further charity donations and philanthropic activities, and to promote environmental awareness and protection.

Japan was first represented in Miss Earth 2001 by Misuzu Hirayama, the first titleholder of Miss Earth Japan and won the Miss Friendship special award.

In 2010, Japan first entered the semifinal and final round of the Miss Earth pageant, where Marina Kishira finished in the top 7 and won the Best in National Costume award in Miss Earth 2010.

== Titleholders ==
Year	Miss Earth Japan Elemental Court Titlists			
Year	Earth	Air	Water	Fire
2026	Yumeha Sakurai; Mie	Shinka Kurata; Oita	Miki Hamada; Chiba	Haruka Tsukamoto; Nagano
2025	Emilia Shimanouchi; Hyogo	Mao Goto; Oita	Reimi Shimizu; Tokyo	Hina Haraguchi; Nagasaki
2024	Ann Furukawa; Hyogo	Yukina Uehara; Saitama	Nako Takeuchi; Oita	Yoshino Maruta; Kagawa
2023	Kilali Oshiro; Okinawa	Haruna Kokubo; Tokyo	Arisa Nagasaka; Osaka	Yume Kusunoki; Niigata
2022	Manae Matsumoto; Saitama	Higa Airi; Okinawa	Narumi Ota; Hyōgo	Riko Kato; Kagawa
2021	Konatsu Yoshida; Hokkaido	Haruka Miura; Aomori	Mari Fujita; Osaka	Rina Takehara; Tokyo Rino Yamada; Ōita
2020	Anna Tode; Saitama	Rina Hanae; Tochigi	Nahu Yasukawa; Osaka	Nagisa Tsutsume; Iwate
2019	Yuka Itoku; Ōita	Mioka Kuniyoshi; Okinawa	Yoshino Kotake; Osaka	Himari Ichinomoya; Fukuoka
2018	Mio Tanaka; Komatsu	Misu Asuka	Kana Kayakawa	Asuka Abe
2017	Yasuko Saito; Fukuoka	Atsumi Tuskamoto; Tokyo	Kasumi Hayakawa; Aichi	Miori Narita; Gunma
2016	Ami Hachiya; Tokyo	Miyu Toyoshima	Manae Miyakoshi	Ayana Matsuda
2015	Ayano Yamada; Gunma	Mai Karihura	Akane Koga	Seina Soushin
2014	Reina Nagata; Saitama	Ai Sugiura; Aichi	Ayaka Wakao; Yamanashi	Kasumi Tsunoda; Aichi
2013	Yu Horikawa; Tokyo	Honami Kuroda	Mai Yamada	Akuri Besyo

== Miss Earth ==
Color keys

- : Declared as Winner
- : Ended as runner-up or Top 4/7 qualification
- : Ended as one of the finalists or semi-finalists
- : Ended as special awards winner

The winner of Miss Earth Japan (MEJ) represents her country at Miss Earth. On occasion, when the winner does not qualify (due to age) for either contest, a runner-up is sent. The following are the names of the annual titleholders of Miss Earth Japan (MEJ), listed according to the year in which they participated in Miss Earth:

Year	Miss Earth Japan	Japanese	Represented	Placement	Special Awards
2026	Yumeha Sakurai	櫻井 夢羽	Mie	TBA	
2025	Reimi Shimizu	清水伶美	Tokyo	Unplaced	(gold) Green Leaders in Action (Asia & Oceania Group 2)
2024	Ann Furukawa	古川 杏	Hyogo	Unplaced	
2023	Kirari Oshiro	大城きらり	Okinawa	Unplaced	
2022	Manae Matsumoto	マナエ 松本	Saitama	Unplaced	
2021	Konatsu Yoshida	吉田こなつ	Hokkaido	Unplaced	(bronze) Dancing Category
2020	Anna Tode	東出 あんな	Saitama	Top 20	(gold) Talent (Creative) (Asia & Oceania); (bronze) Swimsuit (Asia & Oceania)
2019	Yuka Itoku	伊徳 有加	Ōita	Top 20	Miss RealMe
2018	Mio Tanaka	田中 美緒	Komatsu	Top 18	
2017	Yasuko Saito	斎藤 恭代	Fukuoka	Unplaced	(gold) Miss Friendship (Group 2); (bronze) National Costume (Asia Pacific)
2016	Ami Hachiya	蜂谷 晏海	Tokyo	Unplaced	(silver) National Costume (Asia & Oceania)
2015	Ayano Yamada	山田 彩乃	Gunma	Unplaced	
2014	Reina Nagata	永田 怜奈	Saitama	Unplaced	
2013	Yu Horikawa	堀川 優	Tokyo	Unplaced	
2012	Megumi Noda	野田 萌	Shiga	Top 16	
2011	Tomoko Maeda	前田 智子	Tokyo	Top 16	Best in National Costume
2010	Marina Kishira	岸良 真利奈	Chiba	Top 7	Best in National Costume; Miss Earth Sea-Links City Resort; Miss Talent (Top 5)
2009	Tomomi Takada	高田 知美	Tokyo	Unplaced	
2008	Akemi Fukumura	福村 明美	Tokyo	Unplaced	
2007	Ryoko Tominaga	富永 良子	Tokyo	Unplaced	
2006	Noriko Ohno	大野 典子	Tokyo	Unplaced	
2005	Emi Suzuki	鈴木 絵実	Tokyo	Unplaced	
2003	Asami Saito	斉藤 麻美	Tokyo	Unplaced	
2001	Misuzu Hirayama	平山美鈴	Tokyo	Unplaced	Miss Friendship

== See also ==
- Miss Universe Japan
- Miss International Japan
- Miss World Japan
- Miss Japan
- Miss Nippon
- Mister Japan
