= Maren Tschinkel =

German model (born 1998)

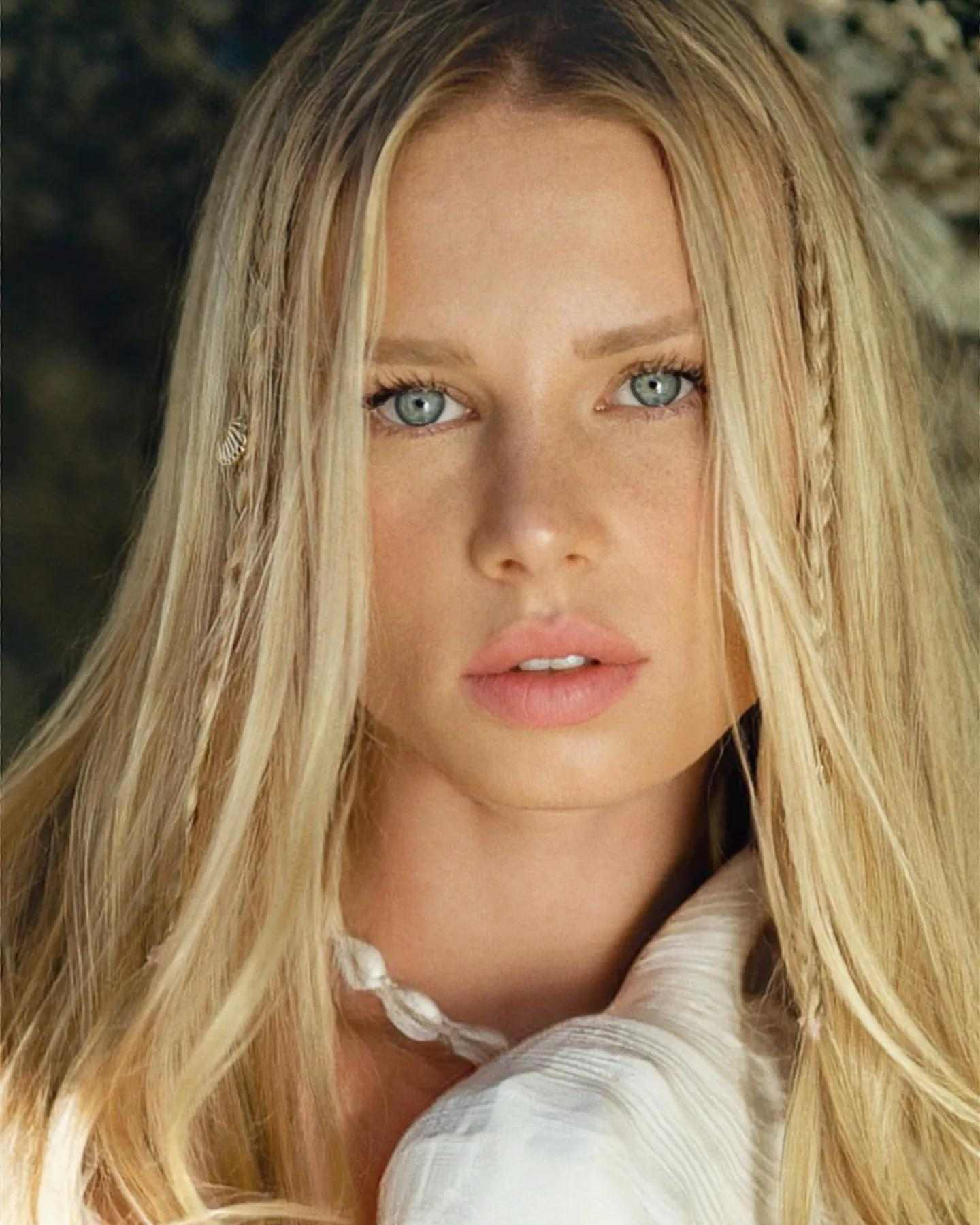
- Born: September 14, 1998 (age 28); Ravensburg, Germany
- Education: University of Augsburg
- Occupations: Model; personal trainer; beauty pageant titleholder; health advocate
- Years active: 2018–present
- Known for: Miss Germany 2018
- Modeling information
- Height: 172 cm (5 ft 8 in)
- Hair color: Blonde
- Eye color: Blue
- Agency: Major Model Management (Milan, NYC)
- Website: marentschinkel.com

Maren Tschinkel (born September 14, 1998) is a German model and participant in beauty pageant titleholder. She was crowned Miss Germany 2018 and represented Germany at the Miss Earth 2018 pageant in Pasay, Philippines.

== Early life and education ==
Tschinkel was born in Ravensburg, Germany, and pursued studies in Economics at the University of Augsburg, Germany.

== Career ==
=== Pageantry ===
In 2017, Tschinkel was selected as TopModel Germany 2017 and participated in the Top Model of the World competition. The following year, she won the Miss Germany 2018 pageant. She represented Germany at the Miss Earth 2018 final on 3 November 2018 at the SM Mall of Asia Arena in Pasay, Philippines.

=== Modeling ===
After Miss Earth 2018, Tschinkel signed with agencies in Europe, and Asia and transitioned to full-time modeling. She has walked runway shows at events including Paris Fashion Week.

Tschinkel appeared on the cover of Vogue, photographed by Ellen von Unwerth.She has been featured in interviews and cover stories for outlets including L'Officiel Cyprus, Times Monaco. She received an award at the 2025 WIBA Awards, held during the Cannes Festival. She has also walked for Adore Me at New York City Fashion Week.

=== Health and fitness advocacy ===
Tschinkel holds a trainer's license. She shares fitness routines, and wellness tips.

She hosts the podcast Health Hacks, where she discusses longevity, movement, nutrition, and mental health with guests. She has stated that she promotes sustainable habits such as regular exercise, balanced meals, sufficient sleep, and time outdoors, rather than restrictive dieting. She has described her advocacy as a response to practices within the fashion industry, encouraging models and followers to prioritize health.

== Awards and Titles ==
- Miss Earth Germany 2018
