= Diamond Langi =

Tongan-New Zealand Actress, Singer, Model and beauty pageant titleholder

- Born: 9 January 1992 (age 34); Auckland, New Zealand
- Height: 1.79 m (5 ft 10 1/2 in)
- Beauty pageant titleholder
- Title: Miss Face of Beauty International 2013; Miss Earth Tonga 2017; Miss Universe New Zealand 2019
- Hair color: Black
- Eye color: Brown
- Major competitions: Miss Face of Beauty International 2013 (Winner); Miss Earth Tonga 2017 (Winner); Miss Earth 2017 (Top 16); Miss Universe New Zealand 2019 (Winner); Miss Universe 2019 (Unplaced)

Diamond Langi (born 9 January 1992) is a Tongan-New Zealand actress, singer, model, and beauty pageant titleholder who was crowned Miss Universe New Zealand 2019. She represented New Zealand at the Miss Universe 2019

== Personal life ==
Diamond Langi was born on 9 January 1992 in Auckland, New Zealand, she is of Tongan, Cape Verdean, Portuguese heritage. Raised in Salt Lake City, Utah. Diamond is an international actress, singer, model, stylist and on camera host. Diamond Langi has graduated with her master's degree in Advanced Professional styling at Australian Style Institute and later went to graduate from Drama school from The Actors Program.

== Pageantry ==
=== Miss Pacific Islands 2012 ===
Langi began her pageantry career when she competed as Miss Bou's Fashion at the annual Miss Heilala pageant in 2012 where the winner competes as Miss Tonga at the Miss Pacific Islands pageant. Diamond placed 4th winning the Sarong (Swim Wear) category.

=== Miss Earth Tonga 2017 ===
Langi was crowned Miss Earth Tonga 2017 and then competed at Miss Earth 2017 pageant in Manila, Philippines.

=== Miss Earth 2017 ===
Langi represented Tonga at Miss Earth 2017 in the Philippines and placed in the Top 16 finalist.

=== Miss Universe New Zealand 2019 ===
Langi returned to her pageantry career to compete at Miss Universe New Zealand 2019 on August 17, 2019, where she won the title of Miss Universe New Zealand 2019.

=== Miss Universe 2019 ===
Langi represented New Zealand at Miss Universe 2019 pageant. During the preliminary swimsuit competition, she got one of her high heels stuck in her long cape and nearly avoided falling on stage. Langi ultimately went unplaced.

Awards and achievements
Preceded by Estelle Curd	Miss Universe New Zealand; 2019	Succeeded by Victoria Velasquez Vincent
