= Nam Em =

Vietnamese model

Nguyễn Thị Lệ Nam Em
- Born: Nguyễn Thị Lệ Nam Em; January 15, 1996 (age 30); Tiền Giang, Vietnam
- Height: 1.72 m (5 ft 8 in)
- Beauty pageant titleholder
- Title: Miss Mekong Delta 2015
- Hair color: Dark Brown
- Eye color: Dark Brown
- Major competitions: Miss Vietnam 2014 (Unplaced); Miss Mekong Delta 2015 (Winner); Miss Universe Vietnam 2015 (Top 10); Miss Earth 2016 (Top 8); Miss World Vietnam 2022 (Top 10); Miss Cosmo Hồ Chí Minh City 2026 (Top 30/TBA)

Nguyễn Thị Lệ Nam Em (born January 15, 1996) is a Vietnamese actress, model and beauty pageant titleholder who was crowned Miss Mekong Delta 2015 pageant held in Cần Thơ, Vietnam. She represented Vietnam and reached the Top 8 finals at Miss Earth 2016 held in Manila, Philippines. S

Awards and achievements
Preceded by Đặng Thu Thảo	Miss Mekong Delta; 2015	Succeeded by Huỳnh Thị Kim Thơ
Preceded by Đỗ Hoàng Anh	Miss Earth Vietnam; 2016	Succeeded by Lê Thị Hà Thu
Preceded by (Mongolia) Bayartsetseg Altangerel	Miss Earth Photogenic; 2016	Succeeded by (Vietnam) Lê Thị Hà Thu
