= Miss Michoacán =

State-level contest in Michoacán, Mexico

- Formation: 2016
- Type: Beauty Pageant
- Headquarters: Morelia
- Location: Mexico
- Local Coordinator: Andrea Juárez, Carlos Castellanos & Juan Manuel Sánchez

Miss Michoacán is a state-level contest in the state of Michoacán, Mexico, which selects the state representative for the national contest Miss México, thus aspiring to represent the country internationally on one of the platforms offered.

The state organization has achieved the following results since 2016:

- Winner: 1 (2019)
- 2nd Runner-up: 1 (2025)
- Top 5/6: 1 (2017)
- Top 16: 1 (2021)
- Unplaced: 4 (2016, 2018, 2023)

== National Queens ==
- Karolina Vidales - Miss México 2021
- Ivonne Hernández - Miss México Global City 2019 (Designated)
- Ivonne Hernández - Miss México Top Model of the World 2018 (Designated)

== Titleholders ==
The following are the names of the annual winners of Miss Michoacán, listed in ascending order, as well as their results during the national Miss México pageant. State queens who represented the country in a current or past franchise of the national organization are also highlighted in a specific color.

Current Franchises:

- Competed at Miss World.
- Competed at Miss Supranational.
- Competed at Miss Cosmo.
- Competed at Miss Elite.
- Competed at Top Model of the World.
- Competed at Reina Internacional del Café.
- Competed at Reina Mundial del Banano.
- Competed at Miss Continentes Unidos.
- Competed at Miss Global City.

Former Franchises:

- Competed at Miss Grand International.
- Competed at Miss Costa Maya International.

Year	Titleholder	Hometown	Placement	Special Award	Notes
2026	Linda Jacqueline González Aguilar	Apatzingán	TBD		Reina Octubrina 2024
2025	Paulina Uceda Escorcia	Uruapan	2nd Runner-up		Will compete at MGI All Stars 2026; MGI All Stars 2026; Mexicana Universal Michoacán 2025; 1st Runner-up at Miss Intercontinental 2021; Miss Intercontinental México 2020; Miss Model of the Universe México 2020; Miss All Nations México 2019; Competed at Mexicana Universal Hidalgo 2018; Miss Intercontinental Michoacán 2017
2024	Due to changes in the dates of the national pageant, the election of the state queens was postponed for this year.				
2023	Elisa Iñiguez (Resigned)	Morelia	Did not Compete	-	-
2023	Verónica Jeannett Cervantes Zolorio (Assumed)	Buenavista	-	-	Top 10 at Miss México Supranational 2025; 2nd Runner-up at Miss Michoacán 2023; Competed at Miss México 2021; Miss Durango 2019; Competed at Miss Michoacán 2018; Competed at Miss Teen Michoacán 2016; Ana Karen Cervantes' sister, Miss Universe Ciudad de México 2025
2022	Due to changes in the dates of the national pageant, the election of the state queens was postponed for this year.				
2021	Irma Yuritzi Guerrero Pacheco (Resigned)	Arteaga	Did not Compete	-	Competed at Flor del Campo 2021; Flor del Campo Michoacán 2021
2021	Edith Alondra Cortés Cortés (Assumed)	Morelia	Top 16	-	World Miss University 2023; 1st Runner-up at Mexicana Universal Michoacán 2022; Competed at Mexicana Universal Michoacán 2021
2020	Ana Laura Vega Oropeza (Resigned)	Zamora	Did not Compete	-	Mexicana Universal Michoacán 2023; Competed at Mexicana Universal Michoacán 2022
2019	Karolina Vidales Valdovinos	Jiquilpan	Miss México	Head to Head	Top 6 at Miss World 2021
2018	Elizabeth García Álvarez	Tangancícuaro	-	-	-
2017	Daniela Frutos Granados (Resigned)	Tacámbaro	Did not Compete	-	-
2017	Ivonne Hernández Mendoza (Assumed)	Morelia	Top 5	Head to Head	Competed at Miss Global City 2019; Miss México Global City 2019; Top 5 at Top Model of the World 2018; Miss México Top Model of the World 2018; Top 5 at Reia Mundial del Banano 2017; Reina del Banano México 2017; 2nd Runner-up at Miss Michoacán 2016
2016	María Nefertari González Núñez	Lázaro Cárdenas	-	-	Top 8 at Miss México Grand 2017

== See also ==
- Mexicana Universal Michoacán
