= Danielle Dolabaille =

Trinidadian beauty pageant titleholder

- Born: November 14, 1993 (age 32); Port of Spain, Trinidad and Tobago
- Beauty pageant titleholder
- Title: Miss Earth Trinidad and Tobago 2015
- Major competitions: Miss Earth 2015 (Unplaced)

Danielle Dolabaille is a Trinidadian beauty pageant titleholder who was crowned as Miss Earth Trinidad and Tobago 2015 and her country's representative in Miss Earth 2015.

== Pageantry ==
Prior being the Miss Earth Trinidad and Tobago, Danielle joined few contests. One of which was when she joined the Face of T&T 2013 pageant and Miss Trinidad & Tobago Universe 2014 where it was won by Jevon King.

Danielle did not win any either of the pageants she had joined.

=== Miss Earth Trinidad and Tobago 2015 ===
At the coronation night of Miss Earth Trinidad and Tobago 2015 held on 17 June 2015, Danielle Dolabaille has been selected to represent Trinidad and Tobago at Miss Earth 2015.

The selection for the delegate was concluded in the month of April in an extensive screening. The coronation ceremony for the same was held on 17 June 2015, where Danielle as the new Miss Earth Trinidad and Tobago was unveiled in front of the media and was crowned as Miss Earth Trinidad and Tobago 2015.

=== Miss Earth 2015 ===
Being appointed as Miss Earth Trinidad and Tobago 2015, Danielle is Trinidad and Tobago's representative to be Miss Earth 2015 and would try to succeed Jamie Herrell as the next Miss Earth.

Awards and achievements
Preceded by Ariana Rampersad (2013)	Miss Earth Trinidad and Tobago; 2015	Succeeded by TBD
