= Ayano Yamada =

Japanese beauty pageant titleholder (born 1990)

- Born: December 1, 1990 (age 35); Gunma Prefecture, Japan
- Height: 1.75 m (5 ft 9 in)
- Beauty pageant titleholder
- Title: Miss Earth Japan 2015
- Major competition: Miss Earth 2015

Ayano Yamada (山田彩乃, Yamada Ayano; born December 1, 1990) is a Japanese beauty pageant titleholder who was crowned Miss Earth Japan 2015 that gives her the right to represent Japan at Miss Earth 2015. She was crowned by Miss Earth Japan 2014, Reina Nagata.

== Pageantry ==
=== Miss Earth Japan ===
Ayano joined the Miss Earth Japan 2015 pageant held on 11 July 2015. At the end of the event, she was hailed as the winner.

Awards and achievements
Preceded by Reina Nagata	Miss Earth Japan; 2015	Succeeded by Ami Hachiya
