= Jessica Marasigan =

Filipino model

- Born: Los Angeles, California, U.S.
- Other names: GirlTrend Jessica; GT Jessica; Ma'am Jess
- Occupations: Beauty pageant titleholder; actress; model; television presenter; singer
- Years active: 2015–present
- Agent: Star Magic
- Beauty pageant titleholder
- Title: Miss Philippines Water 2017
- Hair color: Black
- Eye color: Brown
- Major competitions: Miss Philippines United States 2012 (1st Runner-Up); Binibining Pilipinas–USA 2013 (Winner); Miss Philippines Earth 2017 (Miss Philippines Water); Binibining Pilipinas 2019 (Top 15)

Jessica Marasigan is a Filipino model and beauty queen. She became a Pinoy Big Brother: 737 regular housemate, a GirlTrend member on It's Showtime, one of Miss Philippines Earth 2017 titleholders and a Binibining Pilipinas 2019 candidate.

== Early life ==
Marasigan was born and raised in the United States, but grew up being taught Filipino and Catholic values and exposed to Filipino food. She is the second sibling and only girl in the family.

== Career ==
=== Pinoy Big Brother: 737 ===
In 2015, Marasigan became a regular housemate. She was nominated on the first week but after hearing the news of her grandmother's death, she opted for a voluntary exit on Day 58 to be with her family. She was the first regular housemate to be eliminated.

=== It's Showtime ===
On February 13, 2016, Marasigan became a member of GirlTrends (now called as GT), an all-female dance group, on ABS-CBN's noontime show It's Showtime.

=== FPJ's Ang Probinsyano ===
She's now one of the guest cast of FPJ's Ang Probinsyano as Police Master Sergeant Lea Singson along with PBB Alumnae Franki Russell and Diana Mackey

== Pageantry ==
=== Miss Philippines USA 2012 and Binibining Pilipinas-USA 2013 ===
Prior to entering the Pinoy Big Brother: 737, she also joined several beauty pageants back in the US. She was crowned first runner-up in Miss Philippines-USA in 2012 and a year later joined Binibining Pilipinas-USA where she became the winner.

=== Miss Philippines Earth 2017 ===
Marasigan participated and won as Miss Philippines Water 2017 (equivalent to first runner-up) in the Miss Philippines Earth 2017 pageant on July 15, 2017, at the Mall of Asia Arena in Pasay City, Philippines.

=== Binibining Pilipinas 2019 ===
On March 18, 2019, Marasigan became one of official candidates for Binibining Pilipinas 2019 pageant. On June 9, 2019, she landed at the Top 15, but didn't win a crown.
