= Natalie Kassanga =

English musical theatre actress (born 1997)

- Born: Natalie Soni Kassanga; 1997 (age 28–29); Brent, London, England, U.K.
- Education: Northampton College and Sylvia Young Theatre School
- Occupations: Actress, singer
- Years active: 2007–2010; 2015 – present

Natalie Soni Kassanga (born 1997) is an English actress and singer, known for her work in musical theatre.

== Early life and education ==
Born in Brent, London, Kassanga moved to Milton Keynes at age three, where she grew up in Eaglestone and Bletchley.

Kassanga attended Northampton College and the Sylvia Young Theatre School.

She is a Swahili speaker.

== Career ==
Kassanga began her career as a child. After being discovered by MK Vibe, she made her West End debut in 2007 as Young Nala in The Lion King at the Lyceum Theatre (Alexia Khadime played Older Nala).

She also formed a band called MjeliK with Natalie Chua and was age eleven when she won the 2008 UK Unsigned singing competition.

Kassanga subsequently featured in Fagin's (Rowan Atkinson) gang in the Oliver! revival at the Theatre Royal, Drury Lane, and as one of the children on the U.K. tour of Chitty Chitty Bang Bang.

Later, she joined the six-piece girl group Alien (or Alien Uncovered); the group auditioned for the 2015 series of The X Factor.

In 2018, Kassanga returned to the West End, starring as Diana Ross in Motown: The Musical at the Shaftesbury Theatre. The following year, she was standby for the roles of Zoe Murphy and Alana Beck in the West End production of Dear Evan Hansen at the Noël Coward Theatre.

After the COVID-19 lockdowns, Kassanga starred as Deena Jones on the U.K. tour of Dreamgirls in 2021. For her performance, Kassanga was nominated for Best Female Performer at the Mousetrap Awards.

In 2023, Kassanga featured in the West End transfer and revival of Crazy for You at the Gillian Lynne Theatre, taking over the role of Irene Roth from Merryl Ansah. She also originated the role of Bella in the musical Berlusconi at the Southwark Playhouse. In autumn 2024, Kassanga joined the cast of Moulin Rouge! The Musical at the Piccadilly Theatre in the lead role of Satine opposite Dom Simpson as Christian.

In May 2026 it was announced that Kassanga would replace Grace Mouat in The Jonathan Larson Project at the Southwark Playhouse in the summer of the same year. She joined Max Harwood, Marcus Collins, Michael Mather and Imelda Warren-Green as Woman 2.

== Stage ==
Year	Title	Role	Theatre
2007–2008	The Lion King	Young Nala	Lyceum Theatre, London
2008–2009	Oliver!	Ensemble	Theatre Royal, Drury Lane
2009–2010	Chitty Chitty Bang Bang	Ensemble	UK tour
2018	Motown: The Musical	Diana Ross	Shaftesbury Theatre, London
2019	Dear Evan Hansen	standby Zoe Murphy / Alana Beck	Noël Coward Theatre, London
2021	Dreamgirls	Deena Jones	UK tour
2023	Berlusconi	Bella	Southwark Playhouse, London
2023	Crazy for You	Irene Roth	Gillian Lynne Theatre, London
2024	Moulin Rouge!	Satine	Piccadilly Theatre, London
2026	The Jonathan Larson Project	Woman 2	Southwark Playhouse
