= Peanut Gallery Media Network =

Filipino news website

- Founded: July 4, 2024; 2 years ago
- Founders: Roberto Maria Franco Cruz Mabanta
- Headquarters: Suite 9-D, Valero Tower 122, Salcedo Village, Makati, Philippines
- Key people: Franco Mabanta; CJ Hirro; James Deakin; Orion Perez Dumdum; Louie Sangalang
- Parent: Firebrand Media Group
- Website: https://peanutgallerynews.com

Peanut Gallery Media Network (PGMN; stylized as PGMN) is a Filipino online news and commentary platform established in 2024 and co-founded by Franco Mabanta. It publishes political commentary and other media content through social media platforms such as YouTube, Facebook, Instagram, X, and TikTok. PGMN has described itself as an anti-establishment alternative to traditional media and a platform dedicated to free speech absolutism., while critics have accused it of hyper-partisanship, propaganda, sensationalism and resorting to misinformation While it frames itself as accommodating every political viewpoint, its content lean on conservatism and anti-"wokeness".

== History ==
PGMN was established in July 2024, under Firebrand Media Network launching through their website and Facebook account. By September 2024 PGMN launched its YouTube channel. Within a year, the network had 495,000 Facebook followers and 162,000 on YouTube.

Initially, PGMN started broadcasting online with anchors CJ Hirro, James Deakin, and Raffy Zamora covering mostly political issues in the Philippines, such as the rift between the Marcoses and Dutertes. PGMN anchors later added topics covering HIV, or social issues such as parenting and divorce. The pool of talents would be added with Orion Perez Dumdum and JC Halili. By the third quarter of 2025 the pool of hosts was added with Brandon Vera and Regal Oliva.

During the 2025 Philippine national elections, PGMN reportedly supported candidates including Isko Moreno, Rodante Marcoleta, Paolo Marcoleta, Chavit Singson, and Bong Suntay. The network also published content critical of Suntay's opponent and Quezon City's 4th District Cong. Marvin Rillo, as well as Moreno's opponent Mayor Honey Lacuna.

On May 4, 2026 — one day before Franco Mabanta's arrest by the National Bureau of Investigation in connection with an alleged extortion attempt against Martin Romualdez — PGMN announced its celebration as it was approaching one billion views across its platforms.

== Content ==
PGMN claims to platform people with different political views. It describes itself as a platform accommodating "Conservative, Liberal, DDS, Loyalist or Pink" with a promise not to censor". However an analysis of forensics company, The Nerve says that PGMN's content leans conservative, promotes anti-woke ideas, and engages in red-tagging. PGMN itself is noted to be supportive of its pro-Duterte commentaries.

It largely promotes its own commentators. It also covers international affairs and publishes content supporting of conservative figures such as Donald Trump, Elon Musk, and Charlie Kirk.

== Programs ==
- The LegenDaddy Podcast
- Raw and Real

== Hosts and contributors ==
- CJ Hirro – A PGMN television host. Former host at Net25TV and PTV Channel 4, and 1st Runner-up in Miss Global 2016. A conservative and self-proclaimed "MAGA Filipina".
- Raffy Zamora – proponent of The LegenDaddy Podcast, and currently hosting the PGMN show of the same name.
- James Deakin – former host at CNN Philippines, and currently co-hosting LegenDaddy.
- Orion Perez Dumdum – former Overseas Filipino Worker in Singapore, Battle of the Brains contestant, and constitutional reform activist/co-founder of CoRRECT Movement.
- Rovilson Fernandez – former host and brand model
- Brandon Vera – former mixed martial artist
- Lyn Hazel Calawood – Harvard-trained human factor specialist, and training coach of Filipino gymnast and Olympian Carlos Yulo
- KC Halili – former Ms. Manila 2014, and medical doctor
- Louie Sangalang – former mixed martial artist
- Giselle Sequitin – Financial Advisor for an insurance agency
- Jourdan Sebastian – filmmaker and artist
- Greco Belgica – former Duterte Administration Presidential Anti-Corruption Commissioner
- Regal Oliva
- Rowena Guanzon
- Edu Manzano – actor/TV host and former Makati vice-mayor. He clarified that he is a contributor for PGMN and not as an employee.

== Controversy ==
=== Rift with Cong. Marvin Rillo ===
PGMN host CJ Hirro published a report in April 2025 on the PhP 71 million gymnasium at the Carlos L. Albert High School in Quezon City, sponsored by former Cong. Marvin Rillo with the Department of Public Works and Highways (DPWH) as the implementing agency. The report indicated that the project was not even half complete, with columns and bare walls exposed. Rillo dismissed the allegation as hearsay, and stated that the said project was just in its first phase. Hirro responded that if this project has succeeding phases, then this should have been indicated in the bidding documents with DPWH, and challenged Rillo to an online debate. By October 16, 2025 Rillo filed cyberlibel charges against Hirro and PGMN.

On May 11, 2026, the NBI disclosed that they have received a cyberlibel complaint from former Cong. Rillo.

=== Rift with Cong. Terry Ridon ===
Bicol Saro party-list Representative Terry Ridon accused PGMN in early May 2026 of spreading fake news and disinformation, citing an article and accompanying video about an alleged increase in Meralco electricity bills. The PGMN material featured a consumer claiming a 1,000% increase in their electric bill. Ridon stated that the customer account numbers seen in the electric bills shown by the lady were different, suggesting that the information was misleading and could incite public concern. In response, PGMN denied the allegation and warned that it would expose Ridon as a fake and a fraud. On May 5, 2026 Ridon filed a resolution asking the House of Representatives to investigate PGMN.

=== Anthony Taberna fake news issue ===
On October 2, 2025, radio commentator Anthony Taberna claimed on his show Dos por Dos that Senator Risa Hontiveros had secured more than PhP 3 billion in budget insertions for 2025. The following day, Hontiveros denied these allegations, claiming she had never requested any insertions, nor signed the Bicameral Conference Committee Report for the 2025 General Appropriations Bill. She also confirmed that she voted against the budget act. Subsequently, Taberna retracted his statements. Despite this retraction, PGMN published recaps reiterating the alleged budget insertions attributed to Hontiveros on October 3, 4, and 5.

=== Extortion and entrapment ===
On the morning of May 6, 2026, mainstream media reported that Franco Mabanta and four associates—identified as Ericson James Pacaba, John Alexander Vasquez Gomez, Jardine Christian Serrano, and Franco Jose Gallardo—had been arrested by the National Bureau of Investigation the previous night during an entrapment operation. NBI Director Melvin Matibag stated that the agency had received a complaint from a staff member of former Speaker Martin Romualdez. According to Matibag, the complaint alleged that Mabanta had contacted the staff and claimed to have prepared a video exposé involving Romualdez. The affidavit further alleged that Mabanta initiated phone calls demanding ₱350 million in exchange for not publishing the video on PGMN, and also mentioned an individual identified as CJ Hirro. Following negotiations, the amount was reportedly reduced to ₱300 million, with a ₱70 million down payment to be made by May 5.

Director Matibag stated during a press conference that agents from the NBI's Organized and Transnational Crime Division assumed control of communications with Mabanta and prepared an entrapment operation. According to Matibag, on the morning of May 5, NBI agents met Mabanta at The Peninsula Manila in Makati City. Mabanta reportedly expressed concern about the presence of numerous CCTV cameras in the hotel and indicated that the payment should instead be made at a different location. A video recording of the meeting later circulated on social media. Mabanta subsequently transferred to another building, where NBI agents reportedly lost track of him. He later instructed the agents to meet his staff at Valle Verde Country Club in Pasig City.

Two additional videos later circulated, depicting a speakerphone conversation in which NBI agents received instructions from Mabanta regarding the delivery of the luggage, including its intended recipients and location. NBI Director Matibag stated that three pieces of luggage and two duffel bags had been prepared, containing a combination of marked money and boodle (fake) money. He further explained that this approach is a standard law enforcement practice, following public inquiries—including those from Rowena Guanzon—on how the NBI was able to assemble ₱70 million for the operation. According to Matibag, the government does not provide the full amount demanded in genuine currency in cases involving extortion or kidnapping; instead, the funds typically consist of fake bills layered with a limited amount of real money. He also noted that the acceptance of any amount of actual money may be sufficient to establish the consummation of the offense under applicable law.

Following the luggage drop at Valle Verde Country Club, NBI agents tracked Mabanta's associates to a conference room, where they reportedly found them preparing to transfer the money into different pieces of luggage. Several mainstream media reporters accompanied the NBI agents during the operation and were surprised to find Mabanta along with the suspects arrested along with the marked money.

Later that day, PGMN published a statement across its social media platforms in which it claimed innocence and alleged that the incident had been a setup. The group stated that it had been conducting "immense, comprehensive, and painful" research over the previous five months and had prepared a two-part video exposé. It further claimed that no crime had been committed and asserted that no threat had been made against Romualdez.

Social media discussions also focused on the perceived silence of several anchors regarding Mabanta's arrest. PGMN Anchor CJ Hirro meanwhile has deactivated her social media accounts early morning. An exception was Regal Oliva, who, in a Facebook post on May 6, expressed support for PGMN, stating that it has consistently stood for "free speech, independent commentary, and the constitutional right to question those in power." Oliva also defended Mabanta and his co-accused, emphasizing that they are entitled to the constitutional presumption of innocence until proven guilty. The discussion online also went to accusations among Diehard Duterte Supporters (DDS) and Malacañang, as to who backs Mabanta and PGMN. Undersecretary Claire Castro answered question presenting a photo of Mabanta with former President Rodrigo Duterte from 2016, and stating that he was a long DDS vlogger before he offered his services to President Bongbong Marcos during the 2022 Election campaign. On May 8, Malacañang confirmed that Mabanta worked as Social Media Director of Marcos for 6 months in 2018.

The camp of Romualdez criticized PGMN's claim to innocence and that they are not journalists but plain extortionists. The lawyer of Romualdez stated that if PGMN has any evidence on her client, the proper course was to publish the video and submit the evidence to the appropriate authorities.

ON May 8, the NBI issued a subpoena to PGMN Anchor CJ Hirro in her involvement on the production of the video used for the alleged extortion. NBI claimed that Hirro was involved as she conspired with Mabanta over the video and extortion attempt on Romualdez.

Mabanta and his co-accused posted bail on May 9 and were subsequently released. The following day, PGMN published its exposé on Romualdez, which received mixed reactions. CJ Hirro also reactivated her social media account, where she claimed innocence and described the video as the end of Romualdez. Meanwhile, the NBI said it had received more than 200 messages from individuals who claimed to have received threats from Mabanta and PGMN, and stated that its investigation remained ongoing.

== Criticism ==
University of the Philippines journalism professor Danilo Arao said in an interview that PGMN was not behaving like a journalistic organization. He added that he used PGMN in his classes to illustrate to students how not to write news articles. Investigative journalist and former Human Rights Watch researcher Carlos Conde said that Mabanta and PGMN could not argue that their alleged extortion attempt against Romualdez should be viewed as an attack on press freedom.

On May 11, 2026, the Philippine Daily Inquirer published an editorial piece which criticized Mabanta and PGMN, stating they have no business calling themselves journalists or a news organization, and that they are merely political operators and propagandist who were caught in an extortion attempt. On the same day, Rappler published as well an editorial describing Mabanta as operating in an “attack-collect, defend-collect" or "AC-DC" manner. The editorial also said that Mabanta and PGMN were not considered part of the legitimate or credible media.

On May 10, 2026, PGMN released the 90-minute video titled The Mastermind as an exposé on Martin Romualdez and his wife Yedda Romualdez. Professional journalists, journalism educators, and media critics described the video as containing re-edited footage and articles sourced from other news organizations, characterizing it as lacking original reporting or new revelations. Some commentators called it derivative and dismissed it as failing to deliver substantive new information.
