= Abbey-Anne Gyles =

English model and beauty pageant contestant

Abbey-Anne Gyles-Brown
- Born: Abbey-Anne Gyles-Brown; 12 March 1997 (age 29); Northamptonshire, England
- Education: Northampton College
- Occupations: Television, events, and international model
- Beauty pageant titleholder
- Title: Miss Earth England 2018
- Hair color: Brown
- Eye color: Hazel
- Major competitions: Teen World Supermodel United Kingdom 2013 (Winner) Miss Teen Earth United Kingdom 2014 (Winner); Miss Northampton 2014 (Winner); Miss Earth England 2016 (3rd runner-up); Face of the World 2017 (1st runner-up); Miss Earth England 2018 (Winner); Miss Earth 2018 (England Representative); Ms. Junca Beauty 2018 Beauties For A Cause Eco Ambassador 2018 (Miss Earth UK)

Abbey-Anne Gyles-Brown (born 12 March 1997) is an English model and beauty pageant titleholder who was crowned as Miss Earth England 2018. She represented England at Miss Earth 2018 Abbey-Anne was awarded the Ms Junca Beauty 2018 sponsor award.

== Life and career ==
Abbey-Anne Gyles studied performing arts at Northampton College and worked as match day hostess at Leicester City Football Club

Gyles works as an International model. She has modelled all over the UK, Europe, South Pacific & Asia.

Gyles passed all of her British Theatre Dance Association exams with platinum and distinction.

Gyles is the Lead Youth Activist For Clean Up Britain organisation, which organises school tours to teach children about litter, television guesting and radio interviews, by posting on social media, and attending/organising events or by organising events. She also launched the first inland 2 Minute Litter pick boards in leamington spa for the Now Or Never Campaign which is a new project she is working on with Clean Up Britain.

== Pageantry ==
=== Achievements ===
- Miss Teen Great Britain 2012 Semifinalist
- Teen World Supermodel England 2013
- Beauty Queen Of The Year Personality Award Winner 2013
- Beauty Queen Of The Year Best Smile Award Winner 2013
- Miss Northampton 2014
- Miss Teen Earth United Kingdom 2014
- Miss Teen Earth Northamptonshire 2014
- Miss Earth Northamptonshire 2014-2018
- Miss Earth Fire 2016(England)
- Face of the World England 2017
- Face Of The World International 1st Runner Up
- Miss Earth England 2018
- Beauties For A Cause Eco Ambassador 2018
- Ms Junca Beauty 2018
- Hair And Beauty Award Winner Miss Earth UK 2018
- Photogenic Award Winner Miss Earth UK 2018

=== Miss Earth 2018 ===
Gyles represented England in Miss Earth 2018 pageant in the Philippines. At her national competition held August 25 in Birmingham, she was also awarded Beauties for a Cause Eco Ambassador Award for her ongoing ecological work in the lead up to the national competition along with the Hair and Beauty award. Abbey-Anne has been a dedicated and ongoing Eco Warrior to the Miss Earth Pageant since 2014 after being crowned Miss Teen Earth UK.

On November 8, 2018, Gyles, along with Jaime VandenBerg of Canada and Emma Sheedy of Guam accused one of the Filipino sponsors of sexual harassment during a dinner at the Manila Yacht Club, claiming that he asked them for sexual favors in exchange for the crown or an advancement in the pageant. Sheedy had identified the sponsor as Amado S. Cruz.

Awards and achievements
| Preceded by Charlotte Sophie Brooke | Miss Earth England; 2018 | Succeeded by Stephanie Wyatt |
| Preceded by Kirsty Kennedy | Miss Northampton; 2014 | Succeeded by Giorgia Davies |
