= Miss Earth Trinidad and Tobago =

Beauty contest

- Formation: 2011
- Type: Beauty pageant
- Headquarters: Port of Spain
- Location: Trinidad and Tobago
- Members: Miss Earth
- Official language: English
- National Director: Stephanie Lee Pack (2018-present)

The Miss Earth Trinidad and Tobago is a beauty pageant that has been held since 2011. It is responsible for selecting the country's representative to Miss Earth, which is an annual international beauty pageant promoting environmental awareness.

== History ==
=== Early years ===
Trinidad and Tobago debuted in Miss Earth 2004. However, the organization responsible for sending a delegate failed to send annually.

=== 2015 ===
In 2015, Trinidad and Tobago returned to Miss Earth with Danielle Dolabaille as the delegate in the Miss Earth 2015. The organization responsible is under Mr. Paul Singh. Singh failed to select and send a delegate to Miss Earth the following year.

=== 2018-present ===
Stephanie Lee Pack (former Miss Universe Trinidad and Tobago 1974) has been appointed as national director of Miss Earth Trinidad and Tobago since 2018.

== Titleholders ==
Color key

- Declared as the Winner
- Ended as a Runner-Up
- Ended as one of the Finalists or Semifinalists

The winner of Miss Earth Trinidad & Tobago represents her country at Miss Earth. On occasion, when the winner does not qualify (due to age) for either contest, a runner-up is sent. In 2004 and 2007 the official candidates were selected by another organization.

Year	Miss Earth Trinidad and Tobago	Placement	Special award(s)
2004	Leah Mari Guevara	Top 16	
2007	Carleen Ramlochansingh	Unplaced	
2011	Melanie George-Sharpe	Unplaced	
2012	Amryl Nurse	Unplaced	(silver) Charity Day Challenge
2013	Ariana Rampersad	Unplaced	
2015	Danielle Dolabaille	Unplaced	
2018	Afeya Aneisha Jeffrey	Unplaced	(silver) Talent (Air group)
2023	Shalyma Boisselle	Unplaced	
