= List of television stations in Suriname =

This is a list of television stations in Suriname .

There are many television stations in Suriname. Originally, they broadcast analog TV but are currently transitioning to digital television, so some broadcast both digital and analog channels like Apintie, ABC Suriname, STVS and ATV. Some of the stations do not have websites.

In the following list, the channels correspond with the channel number as seen from the capital of Suriname:

- TV2 Channel 2 (Analog) — (Telesur)
- ABC TV Channel 4.1, 4.2 (Digital) Suriname
- Rapar Broadcasting Network Channel 5 (RBN) (Digital) - 5.1, 5.2 (Alpha Channel), 5.3 (MTA International) 5.4 Alpha Kids
- STVS Channel 8-0 (Analog), 1, 2,3,4,5,6 (Digital) 8-3 hired to Gov TV, 8-4 hired to DNA TV, 8-5 hired to Asosye TV, 8-6 hired to TV Binnenland (Surinaamse Televisie Stichting) 8.7 Koyeba TV, 8.8 Family media, 8.9,8.10,8.11 Sonal TV
- Apintie Televisie Channel 10-1,10-2 hired to WB TV, 10.4 Hired to LPM TV
- Pess TV channel 11-1,2,3,4
  - 11-1 hired to Sargam
- Green TV 13-1,2,3
- ATV Channel 12-1, 2, 3, 4 (Digital) — Algemene Televisie Verzorging **12-3 Atv3 12-4 ucb

(Telesur)

- Radika TV channel 14-1 (Digital) (currently off-air)
- SCCN Channel 17-1, 2, 3 (Digital)
- Pipel TV Channel 18-1, 2 (Digital)
- Trishul Channel 20-1,2,3,4,5,6 (Digital) 20-2 Sranan tv tv 20-3 Madani TV, 20-4 TBN2 20-5 Buzz tv TV 20.6_ TBN
- Garuda TV Channel 23-1, 2, 3,(Digital) 23-3 Dasini TV
- SGM Channel 26-1, 2, 3 ,4(Digital), 26-2 hired to Lime TV 26-4 hired to Sanatan Dharm TV (SDTV)
- Rasonic TV Channel 7-1,2,3,4,5,6,7,8 (Digital) 7-3 hired to KK TV and 7-4 hired to Avenia 7.5 and 7.6 GBN. 7.7 Test, 7.8 RTV
- SBS Channel 32-1,2 (Digital)
  - 32-2 Sargam TV (parbo)
- ABC TV Suriname Channel 36-257, 258, 513, 514 (Digital)
- Ramasha TV Channel 38-1,2 (Digital)
- Surinaams Chinees Televisie Station (SCTV) Channel 45 (Digital) 45.1, 45.2 45.3 (NAMO TV)
- Mustika TV channel 50 (Analog) (not broadcasting)
- Ishara TV (Nickerie) Ishara 22-1, 2, 3, 22.2 hired to Supreme
  - 22.3 hired to Jawa TV
