= James Deakin (host, born 1972) =

Filipino-British television presenter and columnist

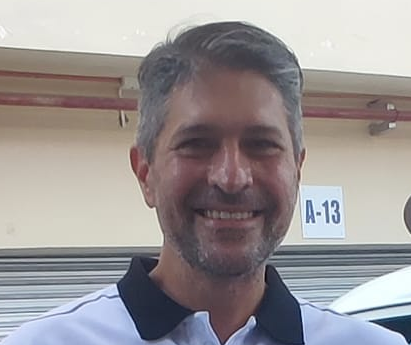
- Born: James Hernandez Deakin; October 27, 1972 (age 53); Makati, Rizal, (Note: At the time Deakin was born, Makati was a municipality of Rizal province, then later became part of Metro Manila on November 7, 1975, by the virtue of Presidential Decree 824 mandated by former President Ferdinand Marcos.) Philippines
- Occupations: Television host; video blogger; column writer
- Years active: 2002–present
- Spouse: Shelley (m. 2013)
- Children: 3
- Website: jamesdeakin.ph

James Hernandez Deakin (born October 27, 1972) is a Filipino-British television and events host, automotive journalist, video blogger, and motoring editor who formerly worked for CNN Philippines and Philippine Tatler.

== Biography ==
James Hernandez Deakin was born on October 27, 1972 in Makati, Philippines to a British father and a Filipino mother. He has two brothers, Patrick and Michael.

== Career ==
Deakin currently works as the motoring editor for Philippine Tatler, a luxury-lifestyle magazine company.

Deakin started working in CNN Philippines since 2014 with his shows Drive and The Service Road, and also hosts New Day every Friday on the same network.

In 2017–2023 and in 2025, Deakin has been the main host of Miss Earth pageants.

Beginning in December 2024, Deakin became one of the program hosts of Peanut Gallery Media Network.

== Personal life ==
Deakin has a wife named Shelley, from New Zealand, with whom he has three children.

On February 14, 2023, he posted a photo on social media indicating that he was dating social influencer Roxy Delevin, who is 20 years younger than him. It is understood that he is separated from his wife although no details have emerged on whether this has been finalized at court.
