= Lada Akimova =

Russian model (born 1998)

- Born: Lada Akimova; 29 October 1998 (age 27); Astana, Kazakhstan
- Height: 1.73 m (5 ft 8 in)
- Beauty pageant titleholder
- Title: Miss Supertalent 2019; Miss Earth Russia 2017; Miss Earth Fire 2017
- Agency: Suta Group; Beauty of Russia
- Hair color: Black
- Eye color: Brown
- Major competitions: Miss Earth 2017 (Miss Earth – Fire)

Lada Akimova (Russian: Лада Акимова; born 29 October 1998) is a Russian model, singer and beauty pageant titleholder who was crowned Miss Earth Fire in 2017 and Miss Supertalent 2019 on May 10, 2019, in Seoul, South Korea. She is the first Miss Supertalent winner from Russia.

== Pageantry ==
=== Miss Earth 2017 ===
On November 4, 2017. Akimova ended up as Miss Earth - Fire 2017 which unofficially equivalent to third runner-up.

=== Miss Supertalent 2019 ===
In May 2019, she traveled to Seoul, South Korea, to represent her country as "Miss Russia" at the Miss Supertalent 2019 and won the title of Miss Supertalent 2019
