= Nuestra Belleza México 2008 =

15th edition of Nuestra Belleza México beauty pageant

- Date: September 20, 2008
- Presenters: Alfredo Adame, Jacqueline Bracamontes
- Entertainment: Playa Limbo, Telefunka
- Venue: Arena Monterrey, Monterrey, Nuevo León, Mexico
- Broadcaster: Televisa
- Entrants: 33
- Placements: 15
- Withdrawals: Estado de México, Quintana Roo
- Returns: Guerrero, Hidalgo, Oaxaca, Tabasco
- Winner: Karla Carrillo; Jalisco

Nuestra Belleza México 2008, the 15th annual Nuestra Belleza México pageant, was held at the Arena Monterrey of Monterrey, Nuevo León, Mexico on September 20, 2008. Thirty-three contestants competed for the national title, which was won by Karla Carrillo from Jalisco, who later competed in Miss Universe 2009 in The Bahamas. Carrillo was crowned by outgoing Nuestra Belleza México titleholder Elisa Nájera. She was the second Jalisciense to win this Title.

The Nuestra Belleza Mundo México title was won by Perla Beltrán from Sinaloa, who later competed in Miss World 2009 in South Africa where she was the 1st Runner-up. Beltrán was crowned by outgoing Nuestra Belleza Mundo México titleholder Anagabriela Espinoza. She was the second Sinaloense to win this Title.

As the Suplente/1st Runner-up the Nuestra Belleza Internacional México 2009 title was won by Laura Zúñiga from Sinaloa, and she would compete in Miss International 2009 in China, but was dethroned on December 25, 2008. She was the second Sinaloense to win this T.

This year was the 15th anniversary of Nuestra Belleza México Organization, and on the final night thirteen ex-Queens were invited to the event. The Recognition "Corona al Mérito 2008" was for Priscila Perales, Nuestra Belleza México 2005, Semifinalist in Miss Universe 2006 and Miss International 2007.

== Results ==
=== Placements ===
Placement	Contestant
Nuestra Belleza México 2008	Jalisco – Karla Carrillo
Nuestra Belleza Mundo México 2008	Sinaloa – Perla Beltrán
1st Runner-Up (Nuestra Belleza Internacional México 2009)	Sinaloa – Laura Zúñiga (Dethroned)
2nd Runner-Up	Sonora – Cecilia Montaño
3rd Runner-Up	Baja California – Paulina Hernández
Top 10	Baja California Sur – Estrella Navarro; Chiapas – Marliese Edelmann; Guanajuato – Andrea Martínez; Nuevo León – Mariana González; Querétaro – Ana Catherina Castrejón
Top 15	Aguascalientes - Kimberley Herrera; Baja California – Nadia Ramos; Oaxaca – Ángeles Aguilar; San Luis Potosí – Lenny Meade de León; Tabasco – Priscila Martínez

=== Order of Announcements ===
==== Top 15 ====
1. Sinaloa
2. Sinaloa
3. Nuevo León
4. Baja California
5. Querétaro
6. Guanajuato
7. Chiapas
8. Tabasco
9. Oaxaca
10. Baja California
11. Aguascalientes
12. Sonora
13. San Luis Potosí
14. Jalisco
15. Baja California Sur

==== Top 10 ====
1. Sinaloa
2. Chiapas
3. Baja California
4. Sonora
5. Guanajuato
6. Querétaro
7. Sinaloa
8. Nuevo León
9. Baja California Sur
10. Jalisco

==== Top 5 ====
1. Baja California
2. Jalisco
3. Sonora
4. Sinaloa
5. Sinaloa

=== Preliminary Competition ===
The Preliminary Competition was held at the Arena Monterrey of Monterrey, Nuevo León, Mexico a few days before to Final Competition. Prior to the final telecast, all contestants competed in swimsuit and evening gown as part of the selection for the others top 10 finalists who were revealed during the beginning of the two-hour live telecast of the Nuestra Belleza México 2008 Pageant live on Televisa on September 20.

The Preliminary Competition was hosted by Silvia Salgado and Patricio Cabezut.

=== Special awards ===
Award	Contestant
Miss Top Model	Sinaloa - Perla Beltrán
Contestants' Choice	Sinaloa - Laura Zuñiga
Miss Talent	Nuevo León - Mariana González
Miss Sports	Baja California - Nadia Ramos
Academic Award	Querétaro - Ana Catherina Castrejón
Personality Fraiche	Jalisco - Karla Carrillo
Best Hair Optims	Sinaloa - Perla Beltrán
Best Skin Optims	Querétaro - Ana Catherina Castrejón
Steps to Fame	Nuevo León - Mariana González

== National Costume Competition ==
In this competition the contestants are not evaluated, only the costumes. It is a competition showing the country's wealth embodied in the colorful and fascinating costumes made by Mexican designers combining the past and present of Mexico.

The Nuestra Belleza México Organization's event discloses the work of Mexican designers and elects the costume to represent Mexico in Miss Universe the next year. Also, some costumes are elected to represent Mexico in other beauty contests.

The winning costume designer receives the "Aguja Diamante Award".

Final results	Contestant
Winner	Sinaloa - "Charrería Mexicana"
Finalists	Campeche - "Tierra Azteca"; Jalisco - "Raíces"; Sinaloa - "Tehuana Dorada"; Yucatán - "Alegoria Maya"

- Aguascalientes - "Doncella Matlazinca"
- Baja California - "Reina PaiPai"
- Baja California - "México Florece"
- Baja California Sur - "Fiesta Mexicana"
- Campeche - "Tierra Azteca"
- Colima - "Raíces de México"
- Colima - "Malinche"
- Colima - "Diosa Teotihuacana"
- Colima - "India Colimota"
- Chiapas - "Culturas Vivientes de mi Tierra"
- Durango - "Raíces de mi Tierra"
- Durango - "Campesina"
- Durango - "Princesa Náhuatl"
- Guerrero - "El Pescador"
- Hidalgo - "Toltecáyotl, Herencia a México"
- Jalisco - "Raíces"
- Michoacán - "Diosa Michoacana"

- Morelos - "Entre Águilas"
- Nuevo León - "Pasión Norteña
- Oaxaca - "Diosa del Maíz"
- San Luis Potosí - "Quechquemitl, Elegante Mujer Huasteca"
- Sinaloa - "Platería Mexicana"
- Sinaloa - "Charrería Mexicana" (Competed in Miss Universe 2009)
- Sinaloa - "Tehuana Dorada" (Competed in Miss International 2008)
- Sinaloa - "La Fertilidad"
- Tabasco - "Mujer del Istmo"
- Tabasco - "Aguas de Tabasco"
- Tabasco - "Pantanos de Centla"
- Veracruz - "Sacerdotisa Huasteca"
- Veracruz - "Quinto Sol"
- Yucatán - "Tesoros de mi Tierra"
- Yucatán - "Alegoria Maya"
- Yucatán - "Mestiza, Pureza de la Mujer"

== Judges ==
=== Preliminary Competition ===
- Priscila Perales - Nuestra Belleza México 2005 & Miss International 2007
- Alberto Santos - Businessman
- Blanca Soto - Nuestra Belleza Mundo México 1997, Miss Verano Viña del Mar 1997, International Top Model
- Norberto Núñez - TV Director & Producer
- Carolina Morán - Nuestra Belleza Mundo México 2006
- Francisco Contreras - Fashion Coordinator
- Rebecca Solano - TV Producer
- Juan José Origel - Journalist & Show Host

=== Final Competition ===
- Alberto Santos - Businessman
- Blanca Soto - Nuestra Belleza Mundo México 1997, Miss Verano Viña del Mar 1997, International Top Model
- Carla Estrada- TV Producer
- Carolina Morán - Nuestra Belleza Mundo México 2006
- Gabriel Soto - El Modelo México 1996 & Actor
- Juan José Origel - Journalist & Show Host
- Norberto Núñez - TV Director & Producer
- Priscila Perales - Nuestra Belleza México 2005 & Miss International 2007
- Salvador Mejía - TV Producer

== Background music ==
- Opening Number: "Medley of the host State" by Contestants
- Swimsuit Competition: "Un Gancho al Corazón", "Tu Voz" by Playa Limbo
- Evening Gown Competition: "Zenith" by Telefunka
- Crowning Moment: "Nuestra Belleza México" (Official Theme)

== Titleholders celebration ==
As part of the pageant 15th Anniversary, 16 Nuestra Belleza México titleholders from the first pageant in 1994 to the outgoing and current titleholders were in attendance.

- Alejandra Quintero - Nuestra Belleza Mundo México 1995
- Katty Fuentes - Nuestra Belleza México 1997
- Blanca Soto - Nuestra Belleza Mundo México 1997
- Vilma Zamora - Nuestra Belleza Mundo México 1998
- Jacqueline Bracamontes - Nuestra Belleza México 2000 (as presenter)
- Rosalva Luna - Nuestra Belleza México 2003
- Dafne Molina - Nuestra Belleza Mundo México 2004
- Priscila Perales - Nuestra Belleza México 2005
- Karla Jiménez - Nuestra Belleza Mundo México 2005
- Carolina Morán - Nuestra Belleza Mundo México 2006
- Elisa Nájera - Nuestra Belleza México 2007 (as outgoing titleholder)
- Anagabriela Espinoza - Nuestra Belleza Mundo México 2007 (as outgoing titleholder)
- Lorenza Bernot - Nuestra Belleza Internacional México 2008 (as outgoing titleholder)
- Karla Carrillo - Nuestra Belleza México 2008 (as current titleholder)
- Perla Beltrán - Nuestra Belleza Mundo México 2008 (as current titleholder)
- Laura Zúñiga - Nuestra Belleza Internacional México 2009 (as current titleholder)

== Contestants ==
State	Contestant	Age	Height (m)	Hometown
Aguascalientes	Kimberley Herrera García	22	1.78	Aguascalientes
Baja California	Nadia Ramos Robles^{1}	23	1.71	Tijuana
Baja California	Paulina Hernández Calderón	20	1.72	Mexicali
Baja California Sur	Estrella Navarro Holm	22	1.76	La Paz
Campeche	Nazli Gantús Bernés	21	1.71	Campeche
Chiapas	Marliese Edelmann Ayala	19	1.76	Tapachula
(Chihuahua (state)) Chihuahua	Nadia Hazel Renpenning Carrasco	19	1.78	Cd. Juárez
Coahuila	Amanda Terry Mondragón	19	1.72	Piedras Negras
Colima	Roxana Espinoza Morentin	19	1.77	Villa de Álvarez
(Mexico City) Distrito Federal	Fernanda Maldonado Cañas	18	1.70	Mexico City
Durango	Margarita Favela Fragoso	23	1.80	Santiago Papasquiaro
Durango	Patricia Castañeda González	20	1.79	Durango
Guanajuato	Andrea Martínez de Velasco Martínez	20	1.72	Celaya
Guerrero	Natali Bastidas García	18	1.70	Acapulco
(Hidalgo (state)) Hidalgo	Karla Solano Armenta	23	1.73	Tulancingo
Jalisco	Karla María Carrillo González	20	1.76	Guadalajara
Michoacán	Alexis Navarro Gutiérrez	20	1.70	Morelia
Morelos	Ana Karen Mascott Carrasco	18	1.72	Cuernavaca
Nayarit	Araceli Félix Partida	18	1.74	Tepic
Nuevo León	Mariana González Elizondo	23	1.73	Monterrey
Oaxaca	Ángeles Aguilar del Puerto	22	1.76	Oaxaca
Puebla	Stephanie Suter Morán	23	1.72	Puebla
Querétaro	Ana Catherina Castrejón y Pérez	21	1.81	Querétaro
San Luis Potosí	Lenny Meade de León	22	1.75	San Luis Potosí
Sinaloa	Laura Elena Zúñiga Huizar	23	1.74	Culiacán
Sinaloa	Perla Judith Beltrán Acosta	21	1.78	Guamúchil
Sonora	Stephanie Díaz Castro	19	1.78	Cananea
Sonora	Blanca Cecilia Montaño Moreno	21	1.84	Hermosillo
Tabasco	Priscila Martínez Andrade	18	1.73	Villahermosa
Tamaulipas	Alejandra Silva Hernández	20	1.72	Cd. Madero
Veracruz	Fabiola Anitúa Valdovinos	19	1.73	Veracruz
Yucatán	María Esther Magadán Alonzo	23	1.70	Progreso
Zacatecas	Sandra González de Santiago	19	1.73	Jerez

^{1} Nadia Ramos was going to compete in 2007 but had to leave the competition due to a family emergency and given the opportunity to participate this year.

== Designates ==
- Baja California - Nadia Ramos
- Durango - Patricia Castañeda
- Sinaloa - Perla Beltrán
- Sonora - Stephanie Díaz

== Returning states ==
- Last competed in 1999:
  - Oaxaca
- Last competed in 2002:
  - Hidalgo
  - Tabasco

- Last competed in 2006:
  - Guerrero

== Withdrawals ==
- (State of Mexico) Estado de México
- Quintana Roo

== Significance ==
- Jalisco won the Nuestra Belleza México title for the second time (before 2000).
- This year the crown of Nuestra Belleza México suffers his fifth change, this new model would continue until 2009.
- Sinaloa won the Nuestra Belleza Mundo México title for the second time (before 2000), the Nuestra Belleza Internacional México title also for the second time (before 1999) and Suplente/1st Runner-up for the third time (before 1999 and 2000)
- This year marks 15 years of the contest and so it was invited thirteen ex-beauty queens who modeled in private gateway.
- It was the first mentioned the name of the winner of Nuestra Belleza Internacional México.
- For the first time a Titleholder was dethroned to the title (Laura Zúñiga, Nuestra Belleza Internacional México 2009).
- Perla Beltran's crown fell to the ground after she congratulated her colleagues on stage, suffering major damage.
- For the fourth time an Afro-Mexican compete in the Nuestra Belleza México pageant (Ángeles Aguilar from Oaxaca, before 1999, 2001 and 2005).
- Guerrero return to competition after two years (2006), Hidalgo and Tabasco after three years (2005) and Oaxaca after nine years (1999).
- Jalisco was placed for fifth consecutive year in the Top 5.
- Jalisco and Nuevo León placed for sixth consecutive year.
- Sonora placed for third consecutive year.
- Chiapas and Guanajuato placed for second consecutive year.
- Oaxaca returned to making calls to the semifinals after twelve years (1996), Baja California Sur after eight years (2000), Querétaro and Tabasco after six years (2002), San Luis Potosí after four years (2004), Aguascalientes after three years (2005) and Baja California and Sonora after two years (2006).
- States that were called to the semifinals last year and this year failed to qualify were Colima, Chihuahua, Distrito Federal, Morelos, Tamaulipa, Veracruz and Yucatán.
- For the second time Alfredo Adame hosted Nuestra Belleza México, with Jacqueline Bracamontes who was her fourth time.
- Sinaloa won Miss Top Model and Contestants' Choice for the first time and Best Hair for the second time (before 1994).
- Nuevo León won Miss Talent for the first time.
- Baja California won Miss Sports for the second time (before 2005).
- Querétaro won the Academic Award and Best National Costume for the first time.
- Jalisco won Fuller Beauty Queen for the first time.
- The host delegate, Mariana González from Nuevo León, placed to finalists.
- Sonora (Cecilia Montaño) is the higher delegate in this edition (1.84 m).
- Campeche (Nazli Gantús), Distrito Federal (Fernanda Maldonado), Guerrero (Natali Bastidas), Michoacán (Alexis Navarro) and Yucatán (María Esther Magadán) are the lower delegates in this edition (1.70 m).
