= Nuestra Belleza México 2007 =

14th edition of Nuestra Belleza México beauty pageant

- Date: October 6, 2007
- Presenters: Alfredo Adame, Jacqueline Bracamontes
- Entertainment: Kalo
- Venue: Auditorio "Profr. Manuel Bonilla Valle", Manzanillo, Colima, Mexico
- Broadcaster: Televisa
- Entrants: 33
- Placements: 15
- Withdrawals: Baja California, Guerrero
- Returns: Estado de México, San Luis Potosí
- Winner: Elisa Nájera; Guanajuato

Nuestra Belleza México 2007, the 14th Nuestra Belleza México beauty pageant, was held at the Auditorio "Profr. Manuel Bonilla Valle" of Manzanillo, Colima, Mexico on October 6, 2007. Thirty-three contestants from the Mexican Republic competed for the national title, which was won by Elisa Nájera from Guanajuato, who later competed in Miss Universe 2008 in Vietnam where she was the 4th Runner-up. Nájera was crowned by outgoing Nuestra Belleza México titleholder Rosa María Ojeda. She is the first and only Guanajuatense to win this title.

The Nuestra Belleza Mundo México title was won by Anagabriela Espinoza from Nuevo León, who later competed in Miss World 2008 in South Africa where she was a semifinalist in the Top 15. Espinoza was crowned by outgoing Nuestra Belleza Mundo México titleholder Carolina Morán. She was the second Neoleonesa to win this title.

This year, the Nuestra Belleza México Organization re-obtained the franchise of Miss International pageant, and selected to Priscila Perales, Nuestra Belleza México 2005 to compete in Miss International 2007 in Japan, winning the title, becoming the first Mexican to win this beauty pageant.

Lorenza Bernot from Morelos was selected by the Nuestra Belleza México Organization as Nuestra Belleza Internacional México 2008 and later competed in Miss International 2008 in Macau. She was the second Morelense to win this Title.

The recognition "Corona al Mérito 2007" was for Luz María Zetina, Nuestra Belleza México 1994 and actress.

== Results ==
=== Placements ===
| Placement | Contestant |
|---|---|
| Nuestra Belleza México 2007 | Guanajuato – Elisa Nájera |
| Nuestra Belleza Mundo México 2007 | Nuevo León – Anagabriela Espinoza |
| 1st Runner-Up | Jalisco – Lupita González |
| 2nd Runner-Up | (Jalisco) – Esmeralda Pimentel |
| 3rd Runner-Up | Colima – Irene Chavira |
| Top 10 | Chiapas – Natalia Ruíz; Chihuahua – Georgina Holguín; Morelos – Lorenza Bernot; Sonora – Carla Cardona; Tamaulipas – Valerie Padilla |
| Top 15 | Distrito Federal – María José del Cueto; Distrito Federal – Vanessa Huppenkothen; Nuevo León – Fabiola Guajardo; Veracruz – Paloma García-Ferro; Yucatán – Valentina Cervera |

=== Order of announcements ===
==== Top 15 ====
1. Morelos
2. Jalisco
3. Sonora
4. Distrito Federal
5. Nuevo León
6. Guanajuato
7. Jalisco
8. Chihuahua
9. Distrito Federal
10. Veracruz
11. Colima
12. Nuevo León
13. Tamaulipas
14. Chiapas
15. Yucatán

==== Top 10 ====
1. Chihuahua
2. Nuevo León
3. Sonora
4. Jalisco
5. Guanajuato
6. Morelos
7. Colima
8. Tamaulipas
9. Chiapas
10. Jalisco

==== Top 5 ====
1. Jalisco
2. Guanajuato
3. Nuevo León
4. Colima
5. Jalisco

=== Special awards ===
| Award | Contestant |
|---|---|
| Miss Top Model | Morelos – Lorenza Bernot |
| Contestants' Choice | Jalisco – Lupita González |
| Miss Talent | Sonora – Carla Cardona |
| Miss Sports | (Mexico City) Distrito Federal – Vanessa Huppenkothen |
| Academic Award | Nuevo León – Anagabriela Espinoza |
| Fuller Beauty Queen | Guanajuato – Elisa Nájera |
| Best Hair Optims | Jalisco – Lupita González |
| Best Skin Nutrimilk | Yucatán – Valentina Cervera |
| Steps to Fame | Sonora – Carla Cardona |

== National Costume Competition ==
In this competition the contestants are not evaluated, only the costumes. It is a competition showing the country's wealth embodied in the colorful and fascinating costumes made by Mexican designers combining the past and present of Mexico.

This event discloses the creative work of Mexican designers and also elects the costume to represent Mexico in Miss Universe the next year. Also, some costumes are elected to represent Mexico in other beauty contests.

The winning costume designer receives the "Aguja Diamante Award".

| Final results | Contestant |
|---|---|
| Winner | Yucatán - "Chichén Itza, Maravilla del Mundo" |
| Finalists | Quintana Roo - "Mascarones de Kuhunlich"; Sinaloa - "China Poblana" |

- Aguascalientes - "Viva Aguascalientes"
- Baja California Sur - "Tierra Prodigiosa"
- Baja California Sur - "Arrecife"
- Campeche - "Ixchel, Gran Señora de los Aires"
- Campeche - "Sol"
- Colima - "Belleza de mi Pueblo"
- Colima - "Princesa Maya"
- Colima - "Belleza Marina"
- Colima - "Princesa Colimán"
- Chiapas - "Alegoria Mexicana"
- Durango - "Maravillas de México"
- Durango - "Ríqueza Mexicana"
- Durango - "Mujer Viñera"
- Durango - "Nogalera"
- Guanajuato - "Diosa del Sol"
- Guanajuato - "Princesa Encantada de la Bufa"
- Jalisco - "Orgullo de mi Pueblo"
- Jalisco - "Mujer Maíz"
- Jalisco - "Agaves"
- Michoacán - "Lirio Acuático"
- Morelos - "Diosa de la Fertilidad"
- Nayarit - "Diosa del Nayar"
- Querétaro - "Los Concheros Chichimecas"
- Quintana Roo - "Mascarones de Kuhunlich"
- San Luis Potosí - "Reencuentro de Mujeres a través del Tiempo
- Sinaloa - "China Poblana" (Competed in Reina Hispanoamericana 2008)
- Sinaloa - "Reina del Mar"
- Tabasco - "Una Ventana al Sureste"
- Tabasco - "Frida, Viva la Vida"
- Tamaulipas - "Raíces de Nuestra Tierra"
- Yucatán - "Chichén Itza, Maravilla del Mundo" (Top 10 in Miss Universe 2008)
- Veracruz - "Orgullo Azteca"
- Veracruz - "Tributo a la Palma"
- Zacatecas - "Danza de los Pardos"

== Judges ==
They were the same judges at the Preliminary and Final Competition.

- Alessandra Rosaldo – Actress & Singer
- Carlos Latapi – Photographer
- Elsa Burgos – Miss Costa Maya International 2002 & Television Hostess
- Eugenio Derbez – Actor, Comedian & Producer
- Gerardo Rebollo – Accessory Designer & Fashion Coordinator
- José Luis Abarca Velázquez – Fashion Designer
- Madeleine García – Fuller Cosmetics Manager
- Marisol González – Nuestra Belleza México 2002 & Actress

== Background music ==
- Opening Number: "Medley of the host State" by Contestants
- Intermediate: Kalo
- Crowning Moment: "Nuestra Belleza México" (Official Theme)

== Contestants ==
| State | Contestant | Age | Hometown |
|---|---|---|---|
| Aguascalientes | Paulina Talamantes Chávez | 20 | Aguascalientes |
| Baja California Sur | Claudia Cepeda Terán | 18 | Comondú |
| Baja California Sur | Luz María Duhart Irabien | 19 | Los Cabos |
| Campeche | Rossina Saravia Lugo | 21 | Campeche |
| Chiapas | Natalia Ruíz Álvarez | 19 | Tuxtla Gutiérrez |
| (Chihuahua (state)) Chihuahua | Lucía Georgina Holguín Lozano | 21 | Chihuahua |
| (Chihuahua (state)) Chihuahua | Priscila Trejo Pérez | 19 | Chihuahua |
| Coahuila | Alejandra Martínez Zepeda | 18 | Torreón |
| Colima | Irene Chavira Maravilla | 19 | Colima |
| (Mexico City) Distrito Federal | María José Del Cueto Dávalos | 22 | Mexico City |
| (Mexico City) Distrito Federal | Vanessa Huppenkothen Labra | 23 | Mexico City |
| Durango | Dulce María Esparza Chaidez | 21 | Durango |
| (State of Mexico) Estado de México | Verónica Espinosa De la Piedra | 23 | Toluca |
| Guanajuato | Elisa Nájera Gualito | 21 | Celaya |
| Jalisco | Esmeralda Pimentel Murguía | 18 | Guadalajara |
| Jalisco | María Guadalupe "Lupita" González Gallegos | 19 | Tepatitlán |
| Michoacán | Yasamin Samiei Vela | 19 | Morelia |
| Morelos | Lorenza Bernot Krauze | 19 | Cuernavaca |
| Nayarit | Ana Karen Romero Ponce | 18 | Tepic |
| Nuevo León | Anagabriela Espinoza Marroquín | 19 | Monterrey |
| Nuevo León | Fabiola Guajardo Martínez | 20 | Monterrey |
| Puebla | Esther Rios Riveramelo | 23 | Puebla |
| Querétaro | Adriana Monroy Mendoza | 20 | Querétaro |
| Quintana Roo | Almendra Espino Landeros | 18 | Chetumal |
| San Luis Potosí | Karla García Tejada | 21 | San Luis Potosí |
| Sinaloa | Yessica Morales Zazueta | 21 | Culiacán |
| Sonora | Carla Cardona González | 20 | Cananea |
| Sonora | Lydia Bernal Liñan | 20 | Hermosillo |
| Sonora | Nilza Domínguez Aguayo | 18 | Hermosillo |
| Tamaulipas | Valerie Padilla Pontvianne | 18 | Tampico |
| Veracruz | Paloma Garcíaferro Lajud | 19 | Veracruz |
| Yucatán | Valentina Cervera Ávila | 20 | Mérida |
| Zacatecas | Edna Paulina Vargas Whitehead | 23 | Zacatecas |

^{1} Nadia Ramos had to leave the competition due to a family emergency, but was given another chance to compete the next year.

== Designates ==
- Baja California Sur – Claudia Cepeda
- Chihuahua – Priscila Trejo
- (Mexico City) Distrito Federal – Vanessa Huppenkothen
- Jalisco – Esmeralda Pimentel
- Nuevo León – Fabiola Guajardo
- Sonora – Lydia Bernal
- Sonora – Nilza Domínguez

== Returning states ==
- Last competed in 2004:
  - San Luis Potosí
- Last competed in 2005:
  - (State of Mexico) Estado de México

== Withdrawals ==
- Baja California – Nadia Ramos had to leave the competition due to a family emergency, but was given another chance to compete the next year.
- Guerrero

== Significance ==
- Guanajuato won the Nuestra Belleza México title for the first time.
- This year the crown of Nuestra Belleza México suffers his fourth change, this new model would continue only this year.
- Nuevo León won the Nuestra Belleza Mundo México title for the second time (before 1995).
- Morelos was appointed as Nuestra Belleza Internacional México for the second time (before 1999).
- This year begins with the first model of crown of Nuestra Belleza Internacional México, this model would continue until 2009.
- Jalisco was the Suplente/1st Runner-up for the second time (before 2006).
- Estado de México return to competition after two years (2005) and San Luis Potosí after three years (2004).
- Jalisco was placed for fourth consecutive year in the Top 5.
- Colima was placed for second consecutive year in the Top 5.
- Tamaulipas placed for ninth consecutive year.
- Distrito Federal, Jalisco and Nuevo León placed for fifth consecutive year.
- Colima, Chihuahua and Sonora placed for second consecutive year.
- Chiapas returned to making calls to the semi-finals after eleven years (1996) and Guanajuato, Morelos, Veracruz and Yucatán after two years (2005).
- States that were called to the semi-finals last year and this year failed to qualify were Coahuila, Michoacán, Nayarit, Puebla and Sinaloa.
- For the first time Alfredo Adame hosted Nuestra Belleza México, with Jacqueline Bracamontes who was her third time.
- Morelos won Miss Top Model for the first time.
- Jalisco won Contestants' Choice and the Best Hair Award for the first time.
- Sonora won Miss Talent and Steps to Fame Award for the first time.
- Distrito Federal won Miss Sports for the second time (before 2006).
- Nuevo León won the Academic Award for the first time.
- Guanajuato won Fuller Beauty Queen for the first time.
- Yucatán won Best National Costume for the third time (before 2001 and 2004).
- The host delegate, Irene Chavira from Colima, placed 3rd Runner-up.

== Contestants notes ==
- Baja California – Nadia Ramos had to leave the competition due to a family emergency, but was given another chance to compete the next year in Nuestra Belleza México 2008 where she was semi-finalist in the Top 15 and she won Miss Sports Award.
- Chiapas – Natalía Ruíz competed in Miss Costa Maya International 2008 but she didn't place.
- Chihuahua – Georgina Holguín represented Mexico in annual pageant Reinado Internacional del Café 2008 in Manizales, Colombia where she was a finalist in the Top 10. She studied in CEA and participated in the soap opera Una familia con suerte of Televisa in 2012.
- Chihuahua – Priscila Trejo participated in Miss Tourism Bikini of the World 2006, which won the main band as Miss Bikini World 2006 Central America.
- Colima – Irene Chavira actually is public relations coordinator for the Miss Turismo Mundo México pageant.
- (Mexico City) Distrito Federal – María José del Cueto is sister of Lucía del Cueto, Nuestra Belleza Distrito Federal 2010.
- (Mexico City) Distrito Federal – Vanessa Huppenkothen the end of their participation in Nuestra Belleza México, took driving lessons at the Televisa's CEA, to participate later in this field in the TVyNovelas Award 2008, part of the festivities of Guerrero Brilla, then joined the ranks of Televisa Deportes and with them participated in the 2008 Olympics in China and covering the World Cup South Africa 2010. She currently works for ESPN Mexico where she anchors ESPN's Spanish version of SportsCenter.
- Guanajuato – Elisa Nájera in Miss Universe 2008 held at the Crown Convention Center in the Diamond Bay Resort, Nha Trang, Vietnam she won the Best in Bikini – Queen of Vinpearl special award title, a trophy and US$2,000, also she was the highest delegate and in the final competition she placed among the top 15 semi-finalists and competed in swimsuit and evening gown before moving on to the final 5, finishing as 4th Runner-up on July 14, 2008. Today she is a TV Hostess and Professional Model.
- Jalisco – Esmeralda Pimentel later studied acting in Televisa's CEA and eventually made her debut in Verano de Amor (2009), playing the role of Ada Claveria. In 2012 she participate in the soap opera Abismo de Pasión.
- Jalisco – Lupita González was chosen to represent Mexico in Miss Continente Americano 2008 held in Centro de Convenciones Simón Bolívar in Guayaquil, Ecuador on September 6, 2008 where she won the title, becoming Mexico's first representative to win that title. Also she won the awards as Miss Photogenic and Miss Yanbal Face. Actually she is a Television Actress, and she participated in the soap opera Ni contigo ni sin ti of Televisa.
- Morelos – Lorenza Bernot months later she was crowned as Nuestra Belleza Internacional México obtaining the right to represent Mexico in Miss International 2008 held at the Venetian Macao Resort Hotel, in the Chinese region of Macau on November 8, 2008 but she didn't place.
- Nayarit – Ana Karen Romero was part of the contestants of Mexico's Next Top Model first cycle (2009), Ana Karen was unable to go further on the competition when she could not manage to make it to the final top 13, she was eliminated on Episode 1, Part 2. She was Señorita Universidad 2005 in Tepic.
- Nuevo León – Anagabriela Espinoza won the Miss World Beach Beauty fast track event and award, which automatically gave her a semi-final spot in Miss World 2008 held at Sandton Convention Centre in Johannesburg, South Africa on December 13, 2008. A year later, was chosen to represent Mexico in Miss International 2009 because Laura Zuñiga was dethroned as Nuestra Belleza Internacional and she lost the right to represent Mexico in this contest. Anagabriela Espinoza won the title as Miss International 2009 at the Sichuan International Tennis Center, Chengdu, Sichuan, China on November 28, 2009. She became the second Mexican delegate to win that title, two years after Priscila Perales' victory in 2007, both Neoleonesas. Today is a TV Hostess in Monterrey.
- Nuevo León – Fabiola Guajardo studied in CEA of Televisa; she is a television actress.
- Sonora – Carla Cardona later made her debut in Camaleones (2009), playing the role of Mercedes "Solo una pastilla" Márquez.
- Yucatán – Valentina Cervera] had won World Sea Queen held in the Maldives Islands and competed in Miss Intercontinental, both in 2004 representing Mexico. The same year she was elected Miss Earth Yucatán obtained the right to represent her state in the national contest of Miss Earth Mexico 2004 where she won the title and represented Mexico in Miss Earth 2004, but she didn't place. On August 10, 2011 she was crowned the new Miss Costa Maya International 2011 held in Belize. Also she has her own model school, "Valentina's Model" in her hometown Mérida.

=== Crossovers ===
Contestants who had competed or will compete at other beauty pageants:

Miss Universe

- 2008: Guanajuato: Elisa Nájera (4th Runner-up)

Miss World

- 2008: Nuevo León: Anagabriela Espinoza (Top 15)

Miss International

- 2008: Morelos: Lorenza Bernot
- 2009: Nuevo León: Anagabriela Espinoza (Winner)

Miss Earth

- 2004: Yucatán: Valentina Cervera

Miss Intercontinental

- 2004: Yucatán: Valentina Cervera

Miss Continente Americano

- 2008: Jalisco: Lupita González (Winner)

Mexico's Next Top Model

- 2009: Nayarit: Ana Karen Romero

Reinado Internacional del Café

- 2008: Chihuahua: Georgina Holguín: (Top 10)

World Sea Queen

- 2004: Yucatán: Valentina Cervera (Winner)

Miss Costa Maya International

- 2008: Chiapas: Natalía Ruiz
- 2011: Yucatán: Valentina Cervera (Winner)

Miss Tourism Bikini of the World

- 2006: Chihuahua: Priscila Trejo

Miss Earth México

- 2004: Yucatán: Valentina Cervera (Winner)

Señorita Universidad

- 2005: Nayarit: Ana Karen Romero (Winner)
