= Nuestra Belleza Puebla 2011 =

- Date: July 13, 2011
- Presenters: Begoña Narváez, Roberto Freymann
- Venue: Complejo Cultural Universitario, Cholula, Puebla
- Broadcaster: Televisa
- Entrants: 8
- Placements: 3
- Winner: Aranza Barbosa; Tehuacán

Nuestra Belleza Puebla 2011, was held at the Complejo Cultural Universitario in Cholula, Puebla on July 13, 2011. At the conclusion of the final night of competition Aranza Barbosa of Tehuacán was crowned the winner. Barbosa was crowned by outgoing Nuestra Belleza Puebla titleholder Ana Laura Gallardo. Eight contestants competed for the title.

== Results ==
=== Placements ===
Final results	Contestant
Nuestra Belleza Puebla 2011	Aranza Barbosa
Suplente / 1st Runner-up	Nicole Smith
2nd Runner-up	María Fernanda Uscanga

=== Special awards ===
Award	Contestant
Miss Congeniality	Daniela Espinoza
Miss Photogenic	Ana Lorena Silva
Miss Talent	Ivonne Acevedo

== Judges ==
- Luis de Llano Stevens - TV Producer
- Karla Jiménez - Nuestra Belleza Mundo México 2005
- Rosa María Ojeda - Nuestra Belleza México 2006
- Tere Guzman
- Paola Huerta
- Marco Samaniego - Photographer
- Paty Brogeras - Regional Coordinator of Nuestra Belleza México
- José Medel Bello

== Background Music ==
- Matute Band

== Contestants ==
Hometown	Contestant	Age	Height
Puebla	Daniela Espinoza Mariscal	21	1.78
Puebla	Nicole Andrea Smith González	23	1.76
Puebla	Ivonne Acevedo Taja	23	1.73
Puebla	Ana Lorena Silva de la Portilla	21	1.75
Puebla	María Fernanda Uscanga de la Vega	23	1.70
Puebla	Andre Ríos Ortega	20	1.70
Tehuacán	Claudia Aranza Barbosa Lima	20	1.75
Zacatlán	Nydia Galindo Salas	20	1.83
