= Nuestra Belleza Baja California Sur 2010 =

- Date: May 21, 2010
- Presenters: Elisa Najera, René Strickler
- Venue: Balneario El Coromuel, La Paz, Baja California Sur
- Broadcaster: Televisa
- Entrants: 12
- Placements: 6
- Winner: Karen Higuera

Nuestra Belleza Baja California Sur 2010, was a pageant held at the Balneario El Coromuel in La Paz, Baja California Sur on May 21, 2010. At the conclusion of the final night of competition, Karen Higuera of San Antonio was crowned the winner. Higuera was crowned by outgoing Nuestra Belleza Baja California Sur titleholder, Giovanna Martínez. Twelve contestants competed for the state title.

The pageant was hosted by Nuestra Belleza México 2007 Elisa Najera and René Strickler.

== Results ==
=== Placements ===
Final results	Contestant
Nuestra Belleza Baja California Sur 2010	Karen Higuera
Suplente / 1st Runner-up	Michel Camacho
2nd Runner-up	Rocío Verdugo
3rd Runner-up	Solimar Delgado
4th Runner-up	Miriam Cervantes
5th Runner-up	Gabriela Ceseña.

=== Special awards ===
Award	Contestant
Miss Photogenic	Solimar Delgado
Miss Congeniality	Miriam Cervantes
Best Body	Rocío Verdugo

== Judges ==
- Jorge Suarez - Businessman
- Carlos Antonio Rico - Producer
- Patricio Borghetti - Actor & Singer
- Ana Laura Corral - National Coordinator of Nuestra Belleza México

== Background Music ==
- Patricio Borghetti
- Studio Jazz Monthiel Uribe
- Academia de Danza Árabe Salam Alikon

== Contestants ==
Hometown	Contestant	Height (m)
Cabo San Lucas	Miriam Maravilla	1.71
Comondú	Chanel Elizalde	1.70
El Triunfo	Sol Delgado	1.72
La Paz	Vianney Duberney	1.73
Los Barriles	Rocío Verdugo	1.80
Loreto	Sugey Arce Rebollar	1.70
Mulegé	Iliana Bareño Starosalía	1.70
Nopoló	Margarita Gómez	1.73
San Antonio	Karen Alicia Higuera Contreras	1.82
San José del Cabo	Michell Camacho	1.80
Santiago	Gabriela Ceseña	1.74
Todos los Santos	Iris Álvarez	1.71
