= Nuestra Belleza México 2006 =

13th edition of Nuestra Belleza México beauty pageant

- Date: September 2, 2006
- Presenters: Jacqueline Bracamontes, Juan José Origel
- Entertainment: Bobby Pulido, Santo Diablito, Belanova, Leo Paryna, Fey
- Venue: Espacio Cultural Metropolitano, Tampico, Tamaulipas, Mexico
- Broadcaster: Televisa
- Entrants: 30
- Placements: 15
- Withdrawals: Estado de México
- Returns: Chiapas, Guerrero
- Winner: Rosa María Ojeda; Sinaloa

Nuestra Belleza México 2006, the 13th Nuestra Belleza México beauty pageant, was held at the Espacio Cultural Metropolitano of Tampico, Tamaulipas, Mexico on September 2, 2006. Thirty contestants of the Mexican Republic competed for the national title, which was won by Rosa Maria Ojeda from Sinaloa, who later competed in Miss Universe 2007 in Mexico where she was a Semifinalist in the Top 10. Ojeda was crowned by outgoing Nuestra Belleza México titleholder Priscila Perales. She was the second Sinaloan to win this title.

The Nuestra Belleza Mundo México title was won by Carolina Morán from Colima, who later competed in Miss World 2007 in China where she was the 2nd Runner-up. Morán was crowned by Nuestra Belleza Mundo México 2004 Dafne Molina. She is the only Coliman and fourth winner of foreign descent (her grandfather is Chinese) to win this Title.

The Recognition "Corona al Mérito 2006" was for Dafne Molina, Nuestra Belleza Mundo México 2004, 1st Runner-up in Miss World 2005 and International Top Model.

== Results ==
=== Placements ===
Final results	Contestant
Nuestra Belleza México 2006	Sinaloa - Rosa María Ojeda Cuen
Nuestra Belleza Mundo México 2006	Colima - Carolina Morán
Suplente/1st Runner-up	Jalisco - Gladys Castellanos
2nd Runner-up	Tamaulipas - Adriana Celis
3rd Runner-up	Baja California - Alejandra Espinoza
Top 10	(Chihuahua (state)) Chihuahua - Carolina Terrones; Michoacán - Tania Rincón; Nayarit - Carolina González; Nuevo León - Mariana Lombard; Puebla - Rosalba Rojas
Top 15	Coahuila - Areli Astorga; (Mexico City) Distrito Federal - Marisol González; Jalisco - Perla Mercado; Nuevo León - Alejandra Ballesteros; Sonora - Melissa Estrella

=== Order of announcements ===
==== Top 15 ====
1. Tamaulipas
2. Colima
3. Jalisco
4. Daitrito Federal
5. Michoacán
6. Sinaloa
7. Chihuahua
8. Nuevo León
9. Puebla
10. Baja California
11. Coahuila
12. Nuevo León
13. Nayarit
14. Sonora
15. Jalisco

==== Top 10 ====
1. Chihuahua
2. Baja California
3. Nayarit
4. Tamaulipas
5. Sinaloa
6. Jalisco
7. Michoacán
8. Nuevo León
9. Puebla
10. Colima

==== Top 5 ====
1. Tamaulipas
2. Baja California
3. Colima
4. Jalisco
5. Sinaloa

=== Special awards ===
Award	Contestant
Miss Top Model	Tamaulipas - Adriana Celis
Contestants' Choice	Colima - Carolina Morán
Miss Talent	Jalisco - Gladys Castellanos
Miss Sports	(Mexico City) Distrio Federal - Marisol González
Academic Award	Michoacán - Tania Rincón
Fuller Beauty Queen	Sinaloa - Rosa María Ojeda
Best Hair Optims	Tamaulipas - Adriana Celis
Best Skin Nutrimilk	Puebla - Rosalba Rojas
Lala Light Figure	Chihuahua - Montserrat Montagut
Steps to Fame	Jalisco - Gladys Castellanos
Best National Costume	Jalisco - Gladys Castellanos; "Mujer Cristera" changed to "Alma de México"

== Judges ==
They were the same judges at the Preliminary and Final Competition.

- Alicia Machado - Miss Universe 1996 & Actress
- Arturo Carmona - Actor
- Gerardo Dragonetti - Fashion Designer
- Héctor Terrones - Fashion Designer
- Marco Méndez - Actor
- Natalia Esperón - Actress
- Odín Dupeyrón - Actor
- Rebeca Tamez - Nuestra Belleza México 1996, Señorita Continente Americano 1997 & Fashion Model
- Denisse Carrera de Esper - Nuestra Belleza Tamaulipas 1994
- Laura de la Torre - Fuller Brand Director

== Background music ==
- Opening Number: "Medley of the host State" by Contestants
- Intermediate: "Vanidosa" by Bobby Pulido
- Swimsuit Competition: "Guapa" by Santo Diablito
- Intermediate: "Rosa Pastel" by Belanova
- Evening Gown Competition: Leo Paryna
- Intermediate: "Y Aquí Estoy" by Fey
- Crowning Moment: "Nuestra Belleza México" (Official Theme)

== Contestants ==
State	Contestant	Age	Height (m)	Hometown
Aguascalientes	Ana Paulina Parga Padilla	19	1.82	Aguascalientes
Aguascalientes	María Alicia Pérez Estrada	18	1.76	Aguascalientes
Baja California	Alejandra Espinoza Cruz	19	1.74	Tijuana
Baja California Sur	Siria Martínez Pérez	20	1.73	La Paz
Campeche	Ana Luisa Campos López	21	1.73	Campeche
Chiapas	Dalia Lazcano Córdoba	20	1.71	Comitán
(Chihuahua (state)) Chihuahua	Montserrat Montagut Enciso	20	1.70	Cd. Juárez
Coahuila	Luz Areli Astorga Gurza	19	1.80	Torreón
Colima	Carolina Morán Gordillo	18	1.79	Manzanillo
(Mexico City) Distrito Federal	Marisol González Ficachi	23	1.74	Mexico City
Durango	Dulce María Félix Piña	22	1.75	Durango
Guanajuato	Pilar Pérez Reyes	20	1.71	León
Guerrero	Cinthia Valle Vidal	20	1.73	Acapulco
Jalisco	Gladys Castellanos Jiménez	18	1.76	Guadalajara
Jalisco	Perla Mercado Barajas	21	1.80	Guadalajara
Michoacán	Tania Vanessa Rincón Sánchez	19	1.73	La Piedad
Morelos	Karla Soto Guerrero	18	1.68	Cuernavaca
Nayarit	Carolina González Serrato	23	1.80	San Blas
Nuevo León	Alejandra Ballesteros González	20	1.74	Monterrey
Nuevo León	Mariana Lombard González	21	1.745	Monterrey
Puebla	Rosalba Rojas Chávez	19	1.81	Puebla
Querétaro	María Fernanda Quinzaños Herrera	19	1.71	Querétaro
Quintana Roo	Mercedes Cortina Martín	20	1.69	Cancún
(San Luis Potosí) Nuevo León	Daniela Gonzalez Escobar	21	1.78	San Luis Potosi
Sinaloa	Rosa María Ojeda Cuen	19	1.71	Culiacán
Sonora	Melissa Estrella Pérez	20	1.80	Nogales
Tamaulipas	Adriana Celis Renero	19	1.78	Cd. Victoria
Veracruz	Magdalena Tavizón Barraza	21	1.79	Veracruz
Yucatán	Isis Barrera Correa	23	1.74	Mérida
Zacatecas	Deyanira Michelle Varela Muñetón	22	1.73	Jerez

== Designates ==
- Aguascalientes - Ana Paulina Parga
- Jalisco - Perla Mercado
- Nuevo León - Alejandra Ballesteros

== Returning states ==
- Last competed in 2002:
  - Chiapas
- Last competed in 2005:
  - Chihuahua
  - Guerrero

== Withdrawals ==
- (State of Mexico) Estado de México

== Significance ==
- Sinaloa won the Nuestra Belleza México title for the second time (before 2003).
- This year the crown of Nuestra Belleza México suffers his third change, this new model would continue only this year.
- Colima won the Nuestra Belleza Mundo México title for the first time.
- This was the fourth time a Winner of Nuestra Belleza México pageant is of foreign descent (Carolina Morán, her grandfather is Chinese).
- Jalisco was the Suplente/1st Runner-up for the first time.
- The event begins with a parade of costumes, it's not carried out since 1998.
- This is the first year in which the outgoing Queen, Nuestra Belleza Mundo México 2005 Karla Jiménez, doesn't give the crown to her successor because of her participation in Miss World 2006 in Warsaw, Poland; Nuestra Belleza Mundo México 2004 and 1st Runner-up in Miss World 2005 Dafne Molina give the crown to the successor.
- Chihuahua, Guerrero and San Luis Potosí return to competition after two years (2004), Chiapas after four years (2002).
- Tamaulipas placed for eighth consecutive year.
- Distrito Federal, Jalisco and Nuevo León placed for fourth consecutive year.
- Baja California and Puebla placed for second consecutive year.
- Nayarit returned to making calls to the semifinals after eight years (1998), Colima after six years (2000), Sinaloa and Sonora after three years (2003), Chihuahua, Coahuila and Michoacán after two years (2004).
- States that were called to the semifinals last year and this year failed to qualify were Aguascalientes, Baja California Sur, Durango, Guanajuato, Morelos, Quintana Roo, Veracruz, Yucatán and Zacatecas.
- For the first time Juan José Origel hosted Nuestra Belleza México, with Jacqueline Bracamontes who was on her second time.
- Tamaulipas won Miss Top Model for the first time and the Best Hair Award for third time (before 1999 and 2001)..
- Colima won Contestants' Choice for the first time.
- Jalisco won Miss Talent, the Steps to Fame Award and Best National Costume for the first time.
- Distrito Federal won Miss Sports for the first time.
- Michoacán won the Academic Award for the first time.
- Sinaloa won Fuller Beauty Queen for the first time.
- Puebla won the Best Skin Award for the first time.
- Chihuahua won the Lala Light Figure Award for the first time.
- The host delegate, Adriana Celis from Tamaulipas, placed to semifinals.
- Aguascalientes (Ana Paulina Parga) is the tallest delegate in this edition (1.82 m).
- Chihuahua (Montserrat Montagut), Morelos (Karla Soto) and Quintana Roo (Mercedes Cortina) are the shortest delegates in this edition (1.68 m).

== Contestants notes ==
- Baja California - Alejandra Espinoza is a Mexican beauty queen. She won the first year of Univision's beauty contest/reality television show Nuestra Belleza Latina 2007 on May 22, 2007, being the first Mexican to win the crown. Espinoza currently works on Sabado Gigante starring Don Francisco. She has appeared several times on El Gordo y La Flaca covering for Lili Estefan. She is represented by MC2 Model Management in Miami.
- Chihuahua - Montserrat Montagut represented Mexico in the Reinado Internacional del Café 2007 where she was the 3rd Runner-up.
- Colima - Carolina Morán is a Mexican model who represented her country in Miss World 2007, which took place on December 1, 2007 at the Crown of Beauty Theatre in Sanya, People's Republic of China, where she placed as the 2nd Runner-up, obtaining the title of Miss World Americas 2007, she also was a semifinalist in the fast track competitions: Top 5 in Miss World Beach Beauty, Top 16 in Miss World Sports and 2nd Runner-up in Miss World Top Model.She is a Professional Model and currently she studies Political Science.
- Guanajuato - Pilar Pérez was born in Culiacán, Sinaloa but lived most of her life in Guanajuato. She currently co-hosts ESPN Deportes sports talk show Nación ESPN.
- Jalisco - Gladys Castellanos represented Mexico in Miss Continente Americano 2007 held in Palacio de Cristal in Guayaquil, Ecuador where she won the 3rd place. She is currently TV Hostess in Televisa Guadalajara.
- Michoacán - Tania Rincón is a TV Hostess in TV Azteca.
- Quintana Roo - Mercedes Cortina was born in Aguascalientes, but she lives for several years in Cancún.
- Sinaloa - Rosa María Ojeda at 15 years of age, she was diagnosed thyroid cancer. After overcoming such unfortunate events during her childhood, she competed in the national beauty pageant Nuestra Belleza México, as well as obtain the right to represent her country in the 2007 Miss Universe pageant. She became the second woman from the state of Sinaloa to win the title since the Nuestra Belleza México pageant first began in 1994. On May 28, 2007, Ojeda placed as a Top 10 finalist in Miss Universe 2007 held at the Auditorio Nacional in Mexico City, Mexico. Previously she also was a finalist in Miss Expo World 2002. Also she was Miss Turismo México Internacional 2004. She is a Professional Model.
- Sonora - Melissa Estrella was the first delegate that represented Mexico in the contest Reina Hispanoamericana 2007 where she won the Miss Congeniality award. This contest was held at the FEXPO, in Santa Cruz, Bolivia on October 26, 2007.
- Tamaulipas - Adriana Celis is sister of Alejandra Celis, Nuestra Belleza Tamaulipas 2003.
- Zacatecas - Deyanira Varela competed at the contest Nuestra Belleza Latina 2008 representing Mexico, she ended up in 10th place. In 2010 she was detained by Jalisco state authorities to be surprised with her boyfriend in possession of 6 stolen cars after a long stretch of investigations, she was found not guilty.

=== Crossovers ===
Contestants who had competed or will compete at other beauty pageants:

Miss Universe

- 2007: Sinaloa: Rosa María Ojeda (Top 10)

Miss World

- 2007: Colima: Carolina Morán (2nd Runner-up)

Miss Continente Americano

- 2007: Jalisco: Gladys Castellanos (2nd Runner-up)

Reina Hispanoamericana

- 2007: Sonora: Melissa Estrella

Reinado Internacional del Café

- 2007: Chihuahua: Montserrat Montagut (3rd Runner-up)

Nuestra Belleza Latina

- 2007: Baja California: Alejandra Espinoza (Winner)
  - Los Angeles's representative
- 2008: Zacatecas: Deyanira Varela (11th Runner-up)
  - Los Angeles's representative

Miss Turismo México

- 2004: Sinaloa: Rosa María Ojeda (Winner)
