= Nuestra Belleza Sinaloa 2011 =

- Date: July 8, 2011
- Presenters: Concepción Soto, Karla Aguirre, Lai Audelo, Sofía López
- Venue: Mazatlan International Center, Mazatlán, Sinaloa
- Broadcaster: Televisa
- Entrants: 12
- Placements: 5
- Winner: Grecia Gutiérrez; Los Mochis

Nuestra Belleza Sinaloa 2011, was held at the Mazatlan International Center in Mazatlán, Sinaloa, Mexico, on July 8, 2011. Twelve contestants competed for the title. At the end of the final night of competition, Grecia Gutiérrez of Los Mochis was crowned the winner by the outgoing Nuestra Belleza Sinaloa titleholder, Tiaré Oliva.

== Results ==
=== Placements ===
Final results	Contestant
Nuestra Belleza Sinaloa 2011	Grecia Gutiérrez
Supente / 1st runner-up	Fátima Álvarez
2nd runner-up	Paloma Llanes
3rd runner-up	Alexis Román
4th runner-up	Cynthia Rosales

== Special awards ==
Final results	Contestant
Miss Photogenic	Grecia Gutiérrez
Miss Congeniality	Jatzibet Hernández
Miss Personality	Elizabeth Gallardo
Best Hair	Alexis Román
Best Image	Cynthia Rosales

== Judges ==
- Patricia Green - image consultant
- Daniel Vicente Gómez - make-up artist
- Amina Blancarte - Nuestra Belleza Sinaloa 1994
- Mónica Coppel - promoting tourism
- Esmeralda Porra - cosmetologist
- Álex Rivera - photographer
- Perla Beltrán - Nuestra Belleza Mundo México 2008

== Contestants ==
Home town	Contestant	Age	Height (m)
Culiacán	Alexis Román	21	1.80
Culiacán	Anahí Robles	21	1.80
Culiacán	Cynthia Rosales	23	1.71
Culiacán	Dayana Chiquete	22	1.71
Culiacán	Elizabeth Gallardo	21	1.72
Culiacán	Jatzibet Hernández	20	1.73
El Fuerte	Mariela Miranda	19	1.72
Los Mochis	Grecia Gutiérrez	22	1.78
Los Mochis	Paloma LLanes	18	1.72
Rosario	Fatima Álvarez	21	1.73
Sinaloa de Leyva	Sandy Zamora	20	1.80
Topolobampo	Shirley Gamez	22	1.84
