= Mexicana Universal Puebla =

Statewide beauty pageant

- The state of Puebla
- Formation: 1994 (as Nuestra Belleza Puebla); 2017 (as Mexicana Universal Puebla)
- Type: Beauty Pageant
- Headquarters: Puebla
- Location: Mexico
- Local Coordinator: Jorge Maceda

Mexicana Universal Puebla (until 2016 called Nuestra Belleza Puebla) is a state-level contest in the state of Puebla, Mexico, which selects the state representative for the national contest Mexicana Universal (formerly called Nuestra Belleza México), thus aspiring to represent the country internationally on one of the platforms offered.

The state organization has achieved the following results since 1994:

- Winner: 4 (2002, 2005, 2018, 2025)
- 3rd Runner-up: 2 (1998, 2019)
- Top 10/11/12: 3 (2006, 2014, 2017)
- Top 15/16: 5 (1994, 2015, 2016, 2021, 2022)
- Top 20/21: 2 (2003, 2005)
- Unplaced: 14 (1995, 1996, 1997, 1999, 2000, 2001, 2004, 2007, 2008, 2009, 2010, 2011, 2012, 2013)
- Absences: 1 (2023)

== National Queens ==
- Didia Rubio - Miss Afrikana México 2026
- Camila Canto - Mexicana Orb 2022 (Designated)
- Regina Peredo - Mexicana Hispanoamericana 2019
- Karla Jiménez - Nuestra Belleza Mundo México 2005
- Blanca Zumárraga - Nuestra Belleza Mundo México 2002

== International Queens ==
- Camila Canto - Miss Orb International 2022
- Regina Peredo - Reina Hispanoamericana 2019

== Titleholders ==
The following are the names of the annual winners of Mexicana Universal Puebla, listed in ascending order, as well as their results during the national Mexicana Universal pageant. State queens who represented the country in a current or past franchise of the national organization are also highlighted in a specific color.

Current Franchises:

- Competed at Miss Grand International.
- Competed at Miss International.
- Competed at Miss Charm.
- Competed at Reina Hispanoamericana.
- Competed at Miss Orb International.
- Competed at Miss Afrikana International.

Former Franchises:

- Competed at Miss Universe.
- Competed at Miss World.
- Competed at Miss Continente Americano.
- Competed at Miss Costa Maya International.
- Competed at Miss Atlántico Internacional.
- Competed at Miss Verano Viña del Mar.
- Competed at Reina Internacional del Café.
- Competed at Reina Internacional de las Flores.
- Competed at Señorita Continente Americano.
- Competed at Nuestra Belleza Internacional.

Year	Titleholder	Hometown	Placement	Special Award	Notes
2025	Didia Amor Rubio Cervantes	Puebla	Miss Afrikana México	-	Will compete at Miss Afrikana International 2027; Was born in Veracruz.
2024	In 2024, due to changes in the dates of the national pageant, the election of the state queens was postponed for one year.				
2023	Irache Pérez García; Withdrew from the national competition due to the postponement of the national pageant.	Puebla	Did not Compete	-	-
2022	María Teresa Arce Romero	Puebla	Top 16	-	-
2021	Paula de la Barrera Zaballa	Puebla	Top 15	-	-
2020	In 2020, due to the contingency of COVID-19 there was a lag in the year of the state contest				
2019	Camila Canto Vera	Puebla	3rd Runner-up	GOC Make Up Image	Miss Orb International 2022; Mexicana Orb 2022
2018	Regina Peredo Gutiérrez	Puebla	Mexicana Hispanoamericana	Best Hair	Reina Hispanoamericana 2019
2017	Monserrat Curis López	Puebla	Top 10	-	1st Runner-up at Nuestra Belleza Puebla 2015; 11th Runner-up at Mexico's Next Top Model 2014
Until 2016 the Title was Nuestra Belleza Puebla
2016	Diana Laura Leal Herrera (Dethroned)	Acatlán de Osorio	Did not Compete	-	Reina Feria de Acatlán de Osorio 2013
2016	María del Carmen Cabildo Bolaños (Successor)	Puebla	Top 15	-	1st Runner-up at Nuestra Belleza Puebla 2016
2015	Lorena Chayban Abdul Massih	Puebla	Top 15	-	1st Runner-up at Miss Lebanon Emigrant 2014; Miss Líbano Emigrante México 2014; First Mexican-lebanese born in Puebla
2014	Fernanda Pulido Díaz-Mercado	Puebla	Top 10	-	Competed at Miss F1 México 2015; Top 5 at Nuestra Belleza Mundo México 2014
2013	Katyna Sánchez de Cima de Crescenzo	Puebla	-	-	First Mexican-italian born in Puebla
2012	Paola D'artigues Rodríguez	Puebla	-	-	Competed at Miss F1 México 2015
2011	Claudia Aranza Barbosa Lima	Tehuacán	-	-	Competed at Miss F1 México 2015
2010	Ana Laura Gallardo Parada	Puebla	-	-	-
2009	Andrea Castro Téllez	Puebla	-	-	-
2008	Stephanie Suter Morán	Puebla	-	-	-
2007	Esther Elena Rios Riveramelo	Puebla	-	-	-
2006	Rosalba Rojas Chávez	Puebla	Top 10	Best Skin Nutrimilk	-
2005	Karla Verónica Jiménez Amezcua	Puebla	Nuestra Belleza Mundo México	-	Top 17 at Miss World 2006
2004	María Vanessa Polo Cajica	Puebla	-	-	-
2003	Beatriz Herrero Sin	Tehuacán	Top 20	-	-
2002	Blanca Rosalía Zumárraga Contreras	Puebla	Nuestra Belleza Mundo México	-	Competed at Miss World 2002; Was born in Veracruz
2001	Karla Estela Gómez Monetti	Puebla	-	-	-
2000	Penélope García Gutiérrez	Puebla	-	-	-
1999	Aurora Lemini Hernández	Puebla	-	-	-
1998	Luisa Fernanda Díaz Maldonado	Puebla	3rd Runner-up	-	Competed in Reina Mundial del Banano 1999; Reina del Banano México 1999
1997	Liliana Flores Bashbush	Puebla	-	-	-
1996	María del Pilar Ariadna Romo Durán	Puebla	-	-	-
1995	Emireth López Pulido	Puebla	-	-	-
1994	Sayi Risso Breton	Puebla	Top 16	-	-

== Designated Contestants ==
Starting in 2000, states were allowed to have more than one candidate, as some states were not sending candidates for various reasons. The following contestants from Puebla were invited to compete in the national pageant alongside the reigning queen, and in some cases, they achieved even better results.

Year	Titleholder	Hometown	Placement	Special Award	Notes
2005	Irantzú Herrero Eguíluz	Tehuacán	Top 20	Miss Talent	1st Runner-up at Nuestra Belleza Puebla 2005
2003	Lorelí Cázarez Zaragoza	Puebla	Top 20		1st Runner-up at Nuestra Belleza Puebla 2003

== See also ==
- Miss Puebla

== See also ==
- Nuestra Belleza Puebla 2011
