= Nuestra Belleza Nuevo León 2006 =

- Date: July 13, 2006
- Presenters: Tere Marín, Patricio Cabezut
- Venue: Las Pampas Eventos, Monterrey, Nuevo León
- Broadcaster: Televisa
- Entrants: 9
- Placements: 4
- Winner: Mariana Lombard; San Pedro

Nuestra Belleza Nuevo León 2006, was held at Las Pampas Eventos in Monterrey, Nuevo León on July 13, 2006. At the conclusion of the final night of competition, Mariana Lombard of San Pedro was crowned the winner. Lombard was crowned by Nuestra Belleza Mundo México 2005 Karla Jiménez. Nine contestants competed for the state title.

The pageant was hosted by Tere Marín and Patricio Cabezut.

== Results ==
=== Placements ===
Final results	Contestant
Nuestra Belleza Nuevo León 2006	San Pedro – Mariana Lombard
Suplente / 1st Runner-up	Guadalupe – Alejandra Ballesteros
2nd Runner-up	Monterrey – Brenda Cavazos
3rd Runner-up	Monterrey – Yazmín Gutiérrez

=== Special awards ===
Award	Contestant
Miss Photogenic	Alejandra Ballesteros
Miss Elegance	Grecia Cantú
Miss Style	Ángela Díaz
Miss Sports	Mariana Lombard

== Judges ==
- Héctor Sandarti – Television Host
- Silvia Galván – Stylist
- Elsa Burgos – Television Hostess & Miss Costa Maya International 2002
- Rebeca Solano – Television Hostess

== Contestants ==
Hometown	Contestant	Age	Height (m)
Cadereyta	Lorena García	22	1.75
Guadalupe	Alejandra María Ballesteros	20	1.73
Monterrey	Ana Leticia Corona Cavazos	21	1.70
Monterrey	Ángela Idalia Díaz Pérez	19	1.73
Monterrey	Brenda Margarita Cavazos García	19	1.73
Monterrey	Marysol de León Oyervides	21	1.73
Monterrey	Yazmín Gutiérrez Zavala	23	1.70
San Pedro	Grecia Cantú Rodríguez	21	1.71
San Pedro	Mariana Lombard González	21	1.73
