= Miss Puebla =

Beauty pageant in Puebla, Mexico

- Formation: 2016
- Type: Beauty pageant
- Headquarters: Puebla
- Location: Mexico
- Local Coordinator: Nydia Soria

Miss Puebla is a state-level contest in the state of Puebla, Mexico, which selects the state representative for the national contest Miss México, thus aspiring to represent the country internationally on one of the platforms offered.

The state organization has achieved the following results since 2016:

- Top 16: 2 (2018, 2019)
- Unplaced: 5 (2016, 2017, 2021, 2023, 2025)

== Titleholders ==
The following are the names of the annual winners of Miss Puebla, listed in ascending order, as well as their results during the national Miss México pageant. State queens who represented the country in a current or past franchise of the national organization are also highlighted in a specific color.

Current Franchises:

- Competed at Miss World.
- Competed at Miss Supranational.
- Competed at Miss Cosmo.
- Competed at Miss Elite.
- Competed at Top Model of the World.
- Competed at Reina Internacional del Café.
- Competed at Reina Mundial del Banano.
- Competed at Miss Continentes Unidos.
- Competed at Miss Global City.

Former Franchises:

- Competed at Miss Grand International.
- Competed at Miss Costa Maya International.

Year	Titleholder	Hometown	Placement	Special Award	Notes
2026	Alondra Michelle Paredes Ortigoza	San Martín Texmelucan	TBD		Competed at Mexicana Universal Puebla 2017; Nuestra Belleza Texmelucan 2015
2025	Alma Giselle Gutiérrez Alonso	San Pedro Cholula	-	-	Will compete at Miss Tourism International 2026; Miss Tourism México 2026; Competed at Mexicana Universal Puebla 2021; Competed at Miss Latinoamérica 2017; Miss Latinoamérica México 2017; 2nd Runner-up at Reina de la Feria de Cholula 2017; Virreina Internacional de la Paz 2016; Reina de la Paz México 2016
2024	In 2024, due to changes in the dates of the national pageant, the election of the state queens was postponed for one year.				
2023	Beatriz Leal Guajardo	Puebla	-	-	Competed at Miss Puebla 2021
2022	In 2022, due to changes in the dates of the national pageant, the election of the state queens was postponed for one year.				
2021	María Fernanda Gómez Cantú	San Andrés Cholula	-	Miss Photogenic	-
2020	In 2020, due to the contingency of COVID-19 there was a lag in the year of the state contest				
2019	Valerie Bartsch Aburto	Atlixco	Top 16	Beauty with a Purpose	-
2018	Alexia Astrid Orozco Pérez	Puebla	Top 16	-	Top 12 at Miss México Grand 2020; 1st Runner-up at Miss México Grand 2019; 2nd Runner-up at Nuestra Belleza Puebla 2016
2017	Sharon Mejía Cruz	Puebla	-	-	1st Runne-up at Miss Teen Universe México 2016; Miss Teen Universe Puebla 2016
2016	Giovanna de la Barreda Angón	Puebla	-	-	Competed at Nuestra Belleza Puebla 2015

== See also ==
- Mexicana Universal Puebla
