= Mexicana Universal Baja California Sur =

Beauty contest

- Formation: 1994 (as Nuestra Belleza Baja California Sur); 2017 (as Mexicana Universal Baja California Sur)
- Type: Beauty Pageant
- Headquarters: La Paz
- Location: Mexico
- Local Coordinator: Ignacio Arévalo

Mexicana Universal Baja California Sur (until 2016 called Nuestra Belleza Baja California Sur) is a state-level contest in the state of Baja California Sur, Mexico, which selects the state representative for the national contest Mexicana Universal (formerly called Nuestra Belleza México), thus aspiring to represent the country internationally on one of the platforms offered.

The state organization has achieved the following results since 1994:

- Winner: 1 (2013)
- 1st Runner-up: 1 (2005)
- Top 10/11/12: 3 (1999, 2008, 2010)
- Top 15/16: 2 (2011, 2017)
- Top 20/21: 2 (2000, 2004)
- Unplaced: 22 (1994, 1995, 1996, 1997, 1998, 1999, 2001, 2003, 2006, 2007, 2009, 2012, 2014, 2015, 2016, 2018, 2019, 2021, 2022, 2023, 2025)
- Absences: 1 (2002)

== National Queens ==
- Josselyn Garciglia - Nuestra Belleza México 2013
- Jessica García-Formentí - Nuestra Belleza Internacional México 2012 (Designated)
- Karen Higuera - Nuestra Belleza Internacional México 2011 (Designated)
- Daniela Cosío - Reina del Café México 2006 (Designated)

== Titleholders ==
The following are the names of the annual winners of Mexicana Universal Baja California Sur, listed in ascending order, as well as their results during the national Mexicana Universal pageant. State queens who represented the country in a current or past franchise of the national organization are also highlighted in a specific color.

Current Franchises:

- Competed at Miss Grand International.
- Competed at Miss International.
- Competed at Miss Charm.
- Competed at Reina Hispanoamericana.
- Competed at Miss Orb International.
- Competed at Nuestra Latinoamericana Universal.

Former Franchises:

- Competed at Miss Universe.
- Competed at Miss World.
- Competed at Miss Continente Americano.
- Competed at Miss Costa Maya International.
- Competed at Miss Atlántico Internacional.
- Competed at Miss Verano Viña del Mar.
- Competed at Reina Internacional del Café.
- Competed at Reina Internacional de las Flores.
- Competed at Señorita Continente Americano.
- Competed at Nuestra Belleza Internacional.

Year	Titleholder	Hometown	Placement	Special Award	Notes
2025	Mayra Michel Taylor Arce	La Paz	-	-	1st Runner-up at Mexicana Universal Baja California Sur 2022
2024	In 2024, due to changes in the dates of the national pageant, the election of the state queens was postponed for this year.				
2023	Nicole Aguirre Cortés	La Paz	-	-	Reina Calafia 2018; Competed at Miss Teen Mundial 2017; Miss Teen Mundial México 2017; Miss Teen Mundial Baja California Sur 2017
2022	Angela Selene Zazueta Gil	La Paz	-	-	Top 16 at Miss Universe Mexico 2026; Miss Universe Baja California Sur 2026
2021	María Fernanda Verdugo Juárez	La Paz	-	-	2nd Runner-up at Nuestra Belleza Baja California Sur 2016
2020	In 2020, due to the contingency of COVID-19 there was a lag in the year of the state contest				
2019	Italy Yedid Reynoso Arvizu	Loreto	-	-	Competed at Nuestra Belleza Baja California Sur 2015
2018	Melissa Tiscareño Antuna	La Paz	-	-	Señorita Mundial 2016; 1st Runner-up at Nuestra Belleza Baja California Sur 2015
2017	Juliana Martínez Camacho	Ciudad Constitución	Top 16	-	Competed at Miss Jalisco 2025
Until 2016 the Title was Nuestra Belleza Baja California Sur
2016	Alma Guadalupe Moreno Montaño	San José del Cabo	-	-	-
2015	Dulce Vanessa Reyes Zaragoza	La Paz	-	-	-
2014	Adela Isela Cázares Bojórquez	Cabo San Lucas	-	-	-
2013	Josselyn Azzeneth Garciglia Bañuelos	La Paz	Nuestra Belleza México	Personality Fraiche	Competed at Miss Universe 2014; Top 5 at Nuestra Belleza Mundo México 2013
2012	Diana Kristal Castro Castro †	La Paz	-	-	Reina del Carnaval de La Paz 2012; Died on 2018
2011	Jessica Cecilia García-Formentí Canseco	La Paz	Top 15	-	Top 15 at Miss International 2012; Nuestra Belleza Internacional México 2012; Miss Earth México-Water 2009; Miss Earth Baja California Sur 2009; Edna García-Formentí's cousin, Miss Earth Baja California Sur 2010
2010	Karen Alicia Higuera Contreras	La Paz	Top 10	-	Competed at Miss International 2011; Nuestra Belleza Internacional México 2011
2009	Giovanna Martínez Uriarte	La Paz	-	-	Was born in Baja California
2008	Estrella Navarro Holm	La Paz	Top 10	-	-
2007	Luz María Duhart Irabien	San José del Cabo	-	-	-
2006	Siria Martínez Pérez	La Paz	-	-	-
2005	Daniela de Jesús Cosío	La Paz	1st Runner-up	Miss Top Model	Competed at Reinado Internacional del Café 2006; Reina del Café México 2006; Berenice Cosío's cousin, Nuestra Belleza Baja California Sur 2001
2004	Beatriz Castro Barraza	La Paz	Top 20	-	-
2003	Gabriela Berenice Martínez Cota	La Paz	-	-	-
2002	No candidate was sent				
2001	Berenice Cosío Yee	La Paz	-	-	Daniela Cosío's cousin, Nuestra Belleza Baja California Sur 2005
2000	Rosalinda Wayas Barroso (Dethroned)	La Paz	-	-	-
1999	Clara Francis Sandez Avilés	La Paz	Top 10	-	-
1998	Borinquen Téllez Vargas	La Paz	-	-	-
1997	María Elizabeth Reyes Rodríguez	La Paz	-	-	-
1996	Guadalupe Celaya Castillo	La Paz	-	-	-
1995	Clementina Ceceña Mascareño	La Paz	-	-	-
1994	María de los Angeles Elizalde Grajeda	La Paz	-	-	-

== Designated Contestants ==
Starting in 2000, states were allowed to have more than one candidate, as some states were not sending candidates for various reasons. The following contestants from Baja California Sur were invited to compete in the national pageant alongside the reigning queen, and in some cases, they achieved even better results.

Year	Titleholder	Hometown	Placement	Special Award	Notes
2007	Claudia Cepeda Terán	Ciudad Constitución	-	-	1st Runner-up at Nuestra Belleza Baja California Sur 2007
2000	Yessenia Anabel Moreno Castro	San José del Cabo	Top 20	-	Top 20 at Nuestra Belleza Mundo México 2000; 1st Runner-up at Nuestra Belleza Baja California Sur 2000

== See also ==
- Miss Baja California Sur
