= Nuestra Belleza Nuevo León 2004 =

- Date: July 6, 2004
- Presenters: Fernando Lozano, Tere Marin
- Venue: Las Lomas Eventos, Monterrey, Nuevo León
- Broadcaster: Televisa
- Entrants: 9
- Placements: 3
- Winner: Ana Paola De la Parra; San Pedro Garza García

Nuestra Belleza Nuevo León 2004, was held at Las Lomas Eventos in Monterrey, Nuevo León on July 6, 2004. At the conclusion of the final night of competition Ana Paola De la Parra of San Pedro Garza García was crowned the winner. De la Parra was crowned by outgoing Nuestra Belleza Nuevo León titleholder Alejandra Villanueva. Nine contestants competed for the title.

== Results ==
=== Placements ===
Final results	Contestant
Nuestra Belleza Nuevo León 2004	San Pedro - Ana Paola De la Parra
Suplente / 1st Runner-up	San Pedro - Priscila Perales
2nd Runner-up	Monterrey - Daniela Plancarte

== Background Music ==
- Jose Cantoral
- Francisco Cespedes

== Contestants ==
Hometown	Contestant	Age	Height (m)
Cadereyta	Lorena Garcia	20	1.77
San Pedro	Ana Paola De la Parra	20	1.75
San Pedro	Priscila Perales	21	1.75
	Cintya Valle	21	1.71
	Daniela Plancarte	20	1.69
	Mariana Paez	20	1.71
	Melissa Jamin	21	1.70
	Sanjuana Elizondo	18	1.73
	Yuri Valero	22	1.75
