= Tania Rincón =

Mexican model and television presenter (born 1986)

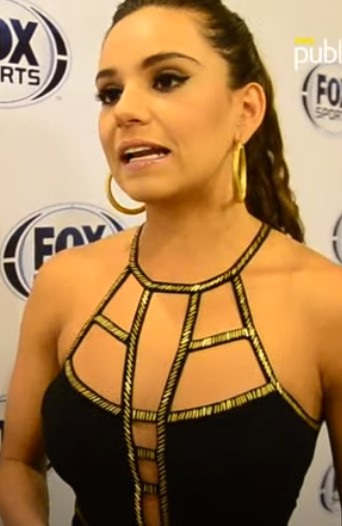
- Born: Tania Vanessa Rincón Sánchez; December 15, 1986 (age 39); La Piedad, Michoacán, Mexico
- Height: 1.73 m (5 ft 8 in)
- Beauty pageant titleholder
- Title: Nuestra Belleza Michoacán 2006
- Hair color: Brown
- Eye color: Brown
- Major competitions: Nuestra Belleza México 2006 (Top 10)

Tania Vanessa Rincón Sánchez (born December 15, 1986) is a Mexican model and television presenter.

After winning the 2006 Nuestra Belleza Michoacán pageant, Rincón earned the right to represent her state in the national Nuestra Belleza México 2006 competition, in which she eventually reached the top 10 and was presented with the contest's annual Academic Award.

Rincón went on to pursue a television career and became host of Fox Sports Latinoamérica's Lo mejor de Fox Sports. She also joined the cast of the entertainment morning talk show Venga la alegría on TV Azteca, serving as a presenter from 2011 to 2019.

Rincón was previously married to businessman Daniel Pérez for 11 years; they had two children together.
