= Ericka Cruz =

Mexican beauty pageant titleholder

- Born: Ericka Yadira Cruz Escalante; November 16, 1981 (age 44); Mérida, Yucatán, Mexico
- Height: 1.78 m (5 ft 10 in)
- Title: Nuestra Belleza México 2001

Ericka Yadira Cruz Escalante is a Mexican athlete, model and beauty titleholder who won Nuestra Belleza México 2001. Recognized as the first Mexican of African descent to win the national competition, she represented Mexico in Miss Universe 2002.

== Life and Career ==
Since she was young represented her home state of Yucatán in various sports competitions and has held the state long jump record since 1995. In 1997 Cruz won a bronze medal in the Central American Games in Honduras, also for the long jump, and for the 4×100 relay.

In 2001, Cruz's victory as Nuestra Belleza México sparked controversy due to her Afro-Mexican heritage, mirroring broader global discussions on racial inclusivity in pageants that year, with similar selections of women of African or part-African ancestry from countries like Peru, Honduras, the Dominican Republic, and Colombia. She represent Mexico at the Miss Universe pageant held at Roberto Clemente Stadium in San Juan, Puerto Rico where did not place among the finalists.

Awards and achievements
Preceded by (Jalisco) Jacqueline Bracamontes	Nuestra Belleza Mexico; 2001	Succeeded by (Coahuila) Marisol González
