= Miss Baja California Sur =

- Formation: 2016
- Type: Beauty Pageant
- Headquarters: La Paz
- Location: Mexico
- Local Coordinator: Tomás Esquer; Jennifer González

Miss Baja California Sur is a state-level contest in the state of Baja California Sur, Mexico, which selects the state representative for the national contest Miss México, thus aspiring to represent the country internationally on one of the platforms offered.

The state organization has achieved the following results since 2016:

- Top 16: 1 (2019)
- Unplaced: 7 (2016, 2017, 2018, 2021, 2023, 2025)

== Titleholders ==
The following are the names of the annual winners of Miss Baja California Sur, listed in ascending order, as well as their results during the national Miss México pageant. State queens who represented the country in a current or past franchise of the national organization are also highlighted in a specific color.

Current Franchises:

- Competed at Miss World.
- Competed at Miss Supranational.
- Competed at Miss Cosmo.
- Competed at Miss Elite.
- Competed at Top Model of the World.
- Competed at Reina Internacional del Café.
- Competed at Reina Mundial del Banano.
- Competed at Miss Continentes Unidos.
- Competed at Miss Global City.

Former Franchises:

- Competed at Miss Grand International.
- Competed at Miss Costa Maya International.

Year	Titleholder	Hometown	Placement	Special Award	Notes
2026	Briana Ruiz	Loreto	TBD		
2025	Karen Juniva Imperial Gaxiola	San José del Cabo	-	-	1st Runner-up at Miss Baja California Sur 2021
2024	Due to changes in the dates of the national pageant, the election of the state queens was postponed for this year.				
2023	Dania Judith Rosales Lizárraga	Cabo San Lucas	-	Miss Photogenic	Top 10 at Miss México Supranational 2025; Top 16 at Miss México Top Model of the World 2024
2022	Due to changes in the dates of the national pageant, the election of the state queens was postponed for this year.				
2021	Jennifer Janet González Cota	San José del Cabo	-	-	Top 8 at Miss México Elite 2023; Reina San José del Cabo 2017
2020	Due to the contingency of COVID-19 there was a lag in the year of the state contest				
2019	Diana Patricia Ramírez Lara	La Paz	Top 16	-	2nd Runner-up at Miss Ultra Universe 2022; Miss Ultra Universe México 2022; 2nd Runner-up at Nuestra Belleza Baja California Sur 2022
2018	Itzayana Guadalupe Meza Arce	Guerrero Negro	-	-	Reina Internacional del Pacífico 2024; Competed at Miss Mesoamérica International 2024; Miss Mesoamérica México 2024; Miss Mesoamérica Baja California Sur 2023
2017	Valeria Castro Verdugo	Cabo San Lucas	-	-	Top 10 at Miss México Elite 2022
2016	Cristina Zacarías Flores	La Paz	-	-	-

== See also ==
- Mexicana Universal Baja California Sur
