= Mexicana Universal Ciudad de México =

- Formation: 1995 (as Nuestra Belleza Distrito Federal); 2017 (as Mexicana Universal Ciudad de México)
- Type: Beauty pageant
- Headquarters: Mexico City
- Location: Mexico
- Local Coordinator: Cristian de Anda

Mexicana Universal Ciudad de México or MXU CDMX (until 2016 called Nuestra Belleza Distrito Federal) is a state-level contest in the Ciudad de México, Mexico, which selects the state representative for the national contest Mexicana Universal (formerly called Nuestra Belleza México), thus aspiring to represent the country internationally on one of the platforms offered.

The state organization has achieved the following results since 1994:

- Winner: 3 (1999, 2004, 2022)
- 1st Runner-up: 1 (1997)
- 2nd Runner-up: 3 (2010, 2012, 2019)
- 3rd Runner-up: 2 (1996, 2003)
- Top 5/6: 1 (1994)
- Top 10/11/12: 10 (1998, 2000, 2005, 2007, 2009, 2011, 2012, 2013, 2014, 2023)
- Top 15/16: 4 (1995, 2006, 2007, 2021)
- Top 20/21: 2 (2001, 2005)
- Unplaced: 9 (2000, 2002, 2008, 2015, 2016, 2017, 2018, 2019, 2025)

== National Queens ==
- Xiadani Saucedo - Mexicana Charm 2024 (Designated)
- Xiadani Saucedo - Mexicana Orb 2024
- Daniela Cardona - Mexicana Hispanoamericana 2024 (Designated)
- Karen Padilla - Miss Continente Americano México 2012 (Designated)
- Dafne Molina - Nuestra Belleza Mundo México 2004
- Danette Velasco - Nuestra Belleza Mundo México 1999
- Karla Blancarte - Reina de las Flores México 1999 (Designated)
- Felicidad Aveleyra - Reina de la Atlantida México 1997 (Designated)

== International Queens ==
- Dafne Molina - Miss World Americas 2005
- Felicidad Aveleyra - Reina de la Atlantida 1997

== Titleholders ==
The following are the names of the annual winners of Mexicana Universal Ciudad de México, listed in ascending order, as well as their results during the national Mexicana Universal pageant. State queens who represented the country in a current or past franchise of the national organization are also highlighted in a specific color.

Current Franchises:

- Competed at Miss Grand International.
- Competed at Miss International.
- Competed at Miss Charm.
- Competed at Reina Hispanoamericana.
- Competed at Miss Orb International.
- Competed at Nuestra Latinoamericana Universal.

Former Franchises:

- Competed at Miss Universe.
- Competed at Miss World.
- Competed at Miss Continente Americano.
- Competed at Miss Costa Maya International.
- Competed at Miss Atlántico Internacional.
- Competed at Miss Verano Viña del Mar.
- Competed at Reina de la Atlantida.
- Competed at Reina Internacional del Café.
- Competed at Reina Internacional de las Flores.
- Competed at Señorita Continente Americano.
- Competed at Nuestra Belleza Internacional.

Year	Titleholder	Hometown	Placement	Special Award	Notes
2026	Andrea Rossel Ruiz Velazco	Mexico City	-	-	Competed at Mexicana Universal Ciudad de México 2024; Competed at Miss Global Model México 2021; Miss Global Model Ciudad de México 2021; Competed at Miss Globe México 2019; Miss Teen Globe Ciudad de México 2019; Angélica Ruiz Velazco'daughter, Señorita Aguascalientes 1988 and Reina Mundial del Banano 1990
2025	Mariana Castillo Ocádiz	Mexico City	-	-	-
2024	María Fernanda Ramírez; Replaced the 2023 state winner, she was originally the 2024 state winner.	Mexico City	Top 10		Competed at Mexicana Universal Ciudad de México 2023; Competed at Mexicana Universal Ciudad de México 2021
2023	Michell Palma Báez; Resigned from her state title due to the postponement of the national pageant.	Mexico City	Did not Compete	-	Competed at Mexicana Universal Ciudad de México 2022
2022	Xiadani Saucedo Arrieta	Mexico City	Mexicana Orb	-	Top 6 at Miss Charm 2024; Mexicana Charm 2024; Top 5 at Miss Orb International 2024; Competed at Mexicana Universal Ciudad de México 2021
2021	Daniela Fernanda Cardona Rosales	Mexico City	Top 16	-	Top 12 at Reina Hispanoamericana 2025; Mexicana Hispanoamericana 2024
2020	In 2020, due to the contingency of COVID-19 there was a lag in the year of the state contest				
2019	Brenda Andrea Smith Lezama	Mexico City	2nd Runner-up	-	Top 16 at Miss Universe 2021; Señorita Panamá 2021; Señorita Panamá Centro 2021; 12th Runner-up at Nuestra Belleza Latina 2018; 1st Runner-up at Miss Georgia USA 2017; Top 16 at Miss Teen USA 2013; Miss Missouri Teen USA 2013; 2nd Runner-up at Miss Georgia Teen USA 2012; First afrodescendant Mexican-panamanian born in the USA
2018	Mirabai Cecilia Schönburg Othon	Mexico City	-	-	First Mexican-british born in the Mexico City
2017	Daniela Larraguivel Ortíz	Mexico City	-	-	Was born in Michoacán
Until 2016 the Title was Nuestra Belleza Distrito Federal
2016	Marielle Ruesga Castañeiras	Mexico City	-	-	-
2015	Stephanie Dash Karam Tovar	Mexico City	-	-	Miss Earth Lebanon 2020; Competed at Miss Grand International 2019; Miss Grand Lebanon 2019; Competed at Miss Lebanon 2018; Competed at Miss International 2016; Miss Líbano Internacional 2016; 2nd Runner-up at Miss Lebanon Emigrant 2016; Miss Líbano México 2016; First Mexican-lebanese born in the Mexico City; Jeanette Karam's sister, Miss Ciudad de México 2018
2014	María Fernanda Garduño Vázquez	Mexico City	Top 10	Miss Top Model	Competed at Miss F1 México 2015
2013	Paulina García Robles	Mexico City	Top 10	-	-
2012	Karen Joselin Padilla Brizuela	Mexico City	2nd Runner-up	-	Top 6 at Miss Continente Americano 2012; Miss Continente Americano México 2012; Was born in Jalisco
2012	Natalia Serrano Lecuona	Mexico City	Top 10	-	-
2011	Mónica Gómez Ortega	Mexico City	Top 10	Miss Sports	Competed at Miss F1 México 2015
2010	Lucía del Cueto Dávalos	Mexico City	2nd Runner-up	Personality Fraiche	Miss Supranational México 2011; María José del Cueto's sister, Nuestra Belleza Distrito Federal 2007
2009	Jacqueline Tostado Madrid	Mexico City	Top 10	-	-
2008	María Fernanda Maldonado Cañas	Mexico City	-	-	Competed at Miss Model of the World 2009; Miss Model of the World México 2009
2007	María José del Cueto Dávalos	Mexico City	Top 15	-	Lucía del Cueto's sister, Nuestra Belleza Distrito Federal 2010
2006	Marisol González Ficachi	Mexico City	Top 15	Miss Sports	-
2005	Priscila Alejandra González Valles	Mexico City	Top 10	Best Skin	-
2004	Dafne Molina Lona	Mexico City	Nuestra Belleza Mundo México	Best Hair; Best National Costume	Miss World Americas 2005; 1st Runner-up at Miss World 2005
2003	Paulina Michelle Alatorre	Mexico City	3rd Runner-up	-	-
2002	Alejandra González Martin	Mexico City	-	-	-
2001	Gabriela Hurtado González	Mexico City	Top 20	Miss Photogenic; Fuller Beauty Queen	Top 21 at Nuestra Belleza Mundo México 2001
2000	Arcelia Alverdi Luna	Mexico City	Top 10	Miss America Online	Top 20 at Nuestra Belleza Mundo México 2000
1999	Danette Velasco Bataller	Mexico City	Nuestra Belleza Mundo México	-	Competed at Miss World 1999
1998	Karla Blancarte Figueroa	Mexico City	Top 11	-	Competed at Reinado Internacional de las Flores 1999; Reina de las Flores México 1999
1997	Felicidad Aveleyra Talamantes	Mexico City	1st Runner-up	Best National Costume	Reina de la Atlantida 1997; Reina de le Atlantida México 1997; 1st Runner-up at Nuestra Belleza Mundo México 1997
1996	Ivette Benavides Rojas	Mexico City	3rd Runner-up	-	2nd Runner-up at Nuestra Belleza Mundo México 1996
1995	Adriana Fregoso Martínez	Mexico City	Top 16	-	-
1994	Tania Elizabeth Turner Sen	Mexico City	Top 6	-	-

== Designated Contestants ==
Starting in 2000, states were allowed to have more than one candidate, as some states were not sending candidates for various reasons. The following contestants from Ciudad de México were invited to compete in the national pageant alongside the reigning queen, and in some cases, they achieved even better results.

Year	Titleholder	Hometown	Placement	Special Award	Notes
2019	Carolina Lucero Castillo	Mexico City	-	-	1st Runner-up at Mexicana Universal Ciudad de México 2019; Competed at Miss Hooters International 2017; Miss Hooters México 2017
2007	Vanessa Huppenkothen Labra	Mexico City	Top 10	-	1st Runner-up at Nuestra Belleza Distrito Federal 2007; First Mexican-german born in the Mexico City
2005	Stephanie Pavlovich Rosas	Mexico City	Top 20	-	1st Runner-up at Nuestra Belleza Distrito Federal 2005
2000	Connie Velázquez Maya	Mexico City	-	-	Runner-up at Nuestra Belleza Distrito Federal 2000
2000	Mónica Portillo Escandón	Mexico City	-	-	Runner-up at Nuestra Belleza Distrito Federal 2000
2000	Paola Cristina Hinojosa Martínez	Mexico City	Top 10	-	Top 20 en Nuestra Belleza Mundo México 2000; Runner-up at Nuestra Belleza Distrito Federal 2000; Was born in Chihuahua

== See also ==
- Miss Ciudad de México
