= Vanessa Huppenkothen =

Mexican actor and model

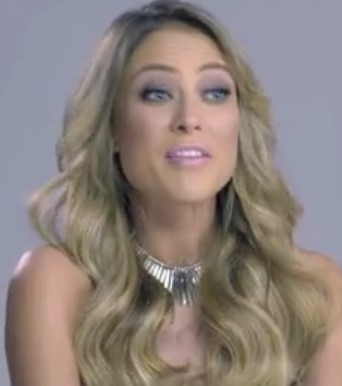
- Huppenkothen in 2014
- Born: Vanessa Huppenkothen Labra; 24 July 1984 (age 41); Mexico City, Mexico
- Education: Instituto Tecnológico Autónomo de México
- Occupations: Television presenter, actress, model
- Years active: 2007–present
- Spouses: Juan Fernández (m. 2011; div. 2013) Ricardo Dueñas (m. 2022)

Vanessa Huppenkothen Labra is a Mexican model and television presenter for ESPN Deportes and ESPN Mexico.

== Early life ==
The daughter of a Mexican mother and a German father, the football player Dieter Huppenkothen, she was born in Mexico City. She grew up in Mexico, but also often lived with her father in Duisburg. At that time, she attended Schalke 04 matches and is still an avowed fan of the Bundesliga club. She is fluent in German. After leaving school, Huppenkothen claims that she studied in Mexico City taking the subject International Relations, eventhough there is no proof of this claim at the government official site. In an interview with German tabloid Bild, Huppenkothen mentioned that she chose this subject because she wanted to be the Mexico ambassador to Germany at that time. Her master's thesis was on FIFA.

== Career ==
Parallel to her studies, she began modelling in 2007. Entering the initial rounds of the Miss Mexico National Contest, she became a Title Holder of the Nuestra Belleza Distrito Federal, and subsequently one of the only two designates from Distrito Federal, Mexico to the Miss Mexico National Contest 2007, where she was the final winner of the Miss Sports Award.

After a TV competition, she won a job as a sports journalist at the Mexican station Televisa Deportes. In 2008, she covered the 2008 Summer Olympic from Beijing. She appeared in a guest role in the 2008 TV series Noticiero Televisa Deportes. In 2010, she acted in iDespierta América!, and appeared as a reporter in Los Héroes del Norte in 2011.

She reported on the Mexico national football team at the 2010 FIFA World Cup in South Africa. For the 2014 FIFA World Cup in Brazil, she was again a presenter for Televisa's coverage of the Mexico national team, during which time she generated considerable attention, even coming amongst the top five searches in Singapore. She was featured as the cover feature model for GQ in June 2014 and Esquire in June 2013, GQ had earlier covered her in November 2012 and Esquire in November 2013.

After nine years in Televisa she left the network in March 2016, she moved to ESPN Mexico in July 2016. She is currently an anchor for the Spanish-language version of SportsCenter. She has also covered various events for the network including the 2018 FIFA World Cup in Russia and the 2022 FIFA World Cup in Qatar.

== Filmography ==
- 2008: Noticiero Televisa Deportes
- 2010: ¡Despierta América!
- 2011: Los Héroes del Norte
