= Nuestra Belleza Nuevo León 2005 =

- Date: July 11, 2005
- Presenters: Fernando Lozano, Tere Marín
- Entertainment: Reik
- Venue: Las Lomas Eventos, Monterrey, Nuevo León
- Broadcaster: Televisa
- Entrants: 8
- Placements: 3
- Winner: Priscila Perales; San Pedro Garza García

The Mexican beauty pageant Nuestra Belleza Nuevo León 2005, was held at Las Lomas Eventos in Monterrey, Nuevo León, on July 11, 2005. Eight contestants competed for the title.

At the end of the final night of competition Priscila Perales of San Pedro Garza García was crowned the winner. Elizondo was crowned by the outgoing titleholder, Ana Paola de la Parra.

== Results ==
=== Placements ===
Final results	Contestant
Nuestra Belleza Nuevo León 2005	San Pedro - Priscila Perales
Suplente / 1st runner-up	Cadereyta - Sandra García
2nd runner-up	San Pedro - Daniela García

=== Special awards ===
Award	Contestant
Miss Photogenic	Priscila Perales
Personal Style	Priscila Perales
Miss Elegance	Sandra García de León
Best Hair	Sofía Alejandra Valdez

== Judges ==
- Luz Elena González - Nuestra Belleza Jalisco 1994 and actress
- Arturo Carmona - actor
- Cecy Gutiérrez - TV hostess
- Silvia Salgado - Nuestra Belleza México 1998
- Ana Laura Corral - national co-ordinator of Nuestra Belleza México

== Background music ==
- Reik - "Qué vida la mía" and "Yo quisiera"

== Contestants ==
Hometown	Contestant	Age	Height (m)
Cadereyta	Sandra Garcia	19	1.75
Monterrey	Diana Campa	22	1.68
Monterrey	Jazmin Aldaz	21	1.71
Monterrey	Nancy Palomo	23	1.73
Santiago	Victoria Garza	18	1.74
San Pedro	Daniela García	22	1.73
San Pedro	Priscila Perales	22	1.75
San Pedro	Sofia Valdez	19	1.74
