= Perla Beltrán =

Mexican model

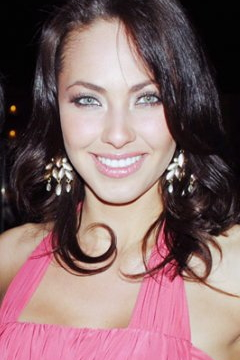
- Born: Perla Judith Beltrán Acosta; September 30, 1986 (age 40); Culiacán, Sinaloa, Mexico
- Height: 1.78 m (5 ft 10 in)
- Beauty pageant titleholder
- Hair color: Black
- Eye color: Green
- Major competitions: Miss Earth México 2007 (Miss Earth–Air); Nuestra Belleza México 2008 (Nuestra Belleza Mundo México); Miss World 2009 (1st runner-up) (Miss World Americas) (Miss World Top Model)

Perla Judith Beltrán Acosta (born September 30, 1986) is a Mexican model and beauty pageant titleholder who placed 1st Runner-Up at Miss World 2009.

== Early life ==
An industrial engineering alumni, Beltrán was born in Culiacán, Sinaloa and raised in Guamúchil from the age of 10. Despite her admiration for beauty queens as a child, Beltrán never expected to take part in the pageant world. However, her mother convinced her to compete in a local contest for the first time in 2001, and she took home the title.

== Nuestra Belleza Mexico ==
Prior to competing in Nuestra Belleza México, Beltrán participated in Miss Earth Mexico in 2007 and placed first runner-up as Miss Air. A year later, 21-year-old Beltrán represented her native Sinaloa in her country's national pageant, Nuestra Belleza México 2008, held in Monterrey, Nuevo León on September 20.

She was named Nuestra Belleza Mundo México among thirty-two other contestants, gaining the right to compete in the 59th Miss World pageant held in Johannesburg, South Africa.

== Miss World 2009 ==
As the official representative of her country to the 2009 Miss World pageant, Beltrán won the Miss World Top Model fast-track event, enabling her to automatically advance to the semifinals. She had previously placed among the top twelve in the Beach Beauty event. Beltrán subsequently obtainted the title of Miss World Americas and placed first runner-up to Miss World 2009, on December 12.

Awards and achievements
Preceded by (Venezuela) Hannelly Quintero	Miss World Americas; 2009	Succeeded by (United States) Alexandria Mills
Preceded by (Russia) Ksenia Sukhinova	Miss World Top Model; 2009	Succeeded by (Norway) Mariann Birkedal
Preceded by (India) Parvathy Omanakuttan	Miss World (1st Runner-Up); 2009	Succeeded by (Botswana) Emma Wareus
