= Nuestra Belleza Nuevo León 2001 =

- Date: July 18, 2003
- Presenters: Rebeca Bausone, Juan Soler
- Venue: Museo del Vidrio, Monterrey, Nuevo León
- Broadcaster: Televisa
- Entrants: 4
- Placements: 2
- Winner: Diana García; Monterrey

Nuestra Belleza Nuevo León 2001, was held at the Museo del Vidrio in Monterrey, Nuevo León on July 18, 2001. At the conclusion of the final night of competition Diana García of Monterrey was crowned the winner. García was crowned by outgoing Nuestra Belleza Nuevo León titleholder, Verónica Gutiérrez. four contestants competed for the title.

== Results ==
=== Placements ===
Final results	Contestant
Nuestra Belleza Nuevo León 2001	Diana Garcia
Suplente / 1st Runner-up	Elsa Burgos

== Contestants ==
Hometown	Contestant
Monterrey	Diana Cristina Garcia Soto
Monterrey	Elsa Burgos
Monterrey	Meztli Garcia
Monterrey	Sara Ramos
