= Laura Zúñiga =

Mexican model (born 1985)

Laura Zúñiga Huizar
- Born: Laura Elena Zúñiga Huizar; 3 January 1985 (age 41); Culiacán, Sinaloa, Mexico
- Height: 1.74 m (5 ft 9 in)
- Beauty pageant titleholder
- Title: Reina Hispanoamericana 2008; Nuestra Belleza Internacional México 2009
- Hair color: Brown
- Eye color: Brown
- Major competitions: Nuestra Belleza México 2008 (1st Runner-Up); Reina Hispanoamericana 2008 (Winner; Dethroned)

Laura Elena Zúñiga Huizar (born 3 January 1985), is a Mexican model and former beauty queen, who in December 2008 became a central figure in an international drug trafficking scandal. The critically acclaimed 2011 film Miss Bala (Miss Bullet) is loosely based on Zúñiga and her involvement in the events of December 2008.

== Biography ==
After winning the state pageant title of Nuestra Belleza Sinaloa, Laura Zúñiga competed against thirty-two other contestants in the national pageant Nuestra Belleza México, held on September 20, 2008, in Monterrey, Nuevo León, where she placed as the suplente and was automatically selected to represent the country in the Miss International 2009 pageant.

=== Scandal ===
On December 22, 2008, Zuñiga was arrested in Zapopan, Jalisco, along with seven men who allegedly carried US$53,000 in cash, two AR-15 rifles, three handguns, 633 cartridges of different calibers, and 16 cellphones. The arrest was made by the state police of Zapopan and Mexican Army officers. In her initial statement, Zuñiga declared that she was on her way to a party in Guadalajara and that she and her boyfriend were going "shopping in Colombia and Bolivia." The media noted that Colombia and Bolivia are both main suppliers of cocaine to the Mexican drug cartels. During a later interview with Joaquín López-Dóriga in Radio Formula, Zuñiga declared that she was kidnapped by her boyfriend Ángel Orlando García Urquiza, apparently a high-ranking leader of the Juárez Cartel and brother of an imprisoned drug lord, and that she was unaware of his illicit activities. The critically acclaimed 2011 film, Miss Bala, or Miss Bullet, is loosely based on Zuñiga. Several key facts are switched in the film, for example, replacing the setting from Sinaloa to Baja California. The basic structure of Zuñiga's story remains, however, such as the allegations of corruption in the pageant organization, Zuñiga's presentation to the media at the time of her arrest, and her allegations that she was not involved in narcotrafficking. Both Zuñiga and the main character, Laura Guerrero, even wear the same clothing when presented to the media and when crowned beauty queens.

The Nuestra Belleza Mexico organization released a statement saying it had no knowledge of Zuñiga's alleged narco-trafficking ties and that it would decide pending an investigation whether or not to let her keep her crown. "Nuestra Belleza Mexico has been a serious, honest and transparent organization", said the group's president Lupita Jones, in the statement sent to the media. On December 25, 2008, a second statement was released announcing that Zuñiga had been stripped of her title as Miss Mexico International 2009. Her successor, Anagabriela Espinoza, was awarded the crown. On December 26, 2008, she was dethroned as Reina Hispanoamericana 2008 and replaced by Vivian Noronha Cia from Brazil.

Zuñiga was sentenced to 40 days under arrest but was released from the detention center on January 30, 2009, after the judge found no evidence that tied her to any criminal activity. Zuñiga made a quiet comeback into the modeling industry in 2010.

Preceded by Massiel Taveras	Reina Hispanoamericana; 2008 (Dethroned)	Succeeded by Vivian Noronha Cia
Preceded by Lorenza Bernot	Nuestra Belleza Internacional México; 2009 (Dethroned)	Succeeded by Anagabriela Espinoza
