= Nuestra Belleza México 2005 =

12th edition of Nuestra Belleza México beauty pageant

- Date: September 2, 2005
- Presenters: Ernesto Laguardia, Paulina Flores, Silvia Salgado, Jacqueline Bracamontes, Vilma Zamora, Tania Vázquez
- Entertainment: Elefante
- Venue: Antiguo Taller de Locomotoras, Aguascalientes, Aguascalientes, Mexico
- Broadcaster: Televisa
- Entrants: 33
- Placements: 20
- Withdrawals: Chihuahua, Guerrero, San Luis Potosí
- Returns: Aguascalientes, Estado de México, Morelos, Querétaro, Quintana Roo
- Winner: Priscila Perales; Nuevo León

Nuestra Belleza México 2005, the 12th Nuestra Belleza México pageant, was held at the Antiguo Taller de Locomotoras of Aguascalientes, Aguascalientes, Mexico on September 2, 2005. Thirty-three contestants of the Mexican Republic competed for the national title, which was won by Priscila Perales from Nuevo León, who later competed in Miss Universe 2006 in United States where she was a semifinalist in the Top 10. Perales was crowned by the outgoing Nuestra Belleza México titleholder Laura Elizondo. She was the third Neoleonesa to win this title.

The Nuestra Belleza Mundo México title was won by Karla Jiménez from Puebla, who later competed in Miss World 2006 in Poland where she was a semifinalist in the Top 17. Jiménez was crowned by the outgoing Nuestra Belleza Mundo México titleholder Dafne Molina. She was the second Poblano to win this title.

This year established the "Reina de Un Millón", a new prize structure that encourages more quality and participation of young Mexican and get the public's interest for our representatives at international events.

The recognition "Corona al Mérito 2005" was for Blanca Soto, Nuestra Belleza Mundo México 1997, Miss Verano Viña del Mar 1997 and International Top Model.

== Results ==
=== Placements ===
Final results	Contestant
Nuestra Belleza México 2005	Nuevo León - Priscila Perales
Nuestra Belleza Mundo México 2005	Puebla - Karla Jiménez
Suplente/1st Runner-up	Baja California Sur - Daniela Cosio
2nd Runner-up	Jalisco - Ana Paola Sifuentes
3rd Runner-up	Tamaulipas - Julia Muñoz
Top 10	Baja California - Marcela Rubio; (Mexico City) Distrito Federal - Priscila Valles; Guanajuato - Angela Sandoval; Veracruz - Cindy Cajuste; Zacatecas - Diana Jiménez
Top 20	Aguascalientes - Vanessa Castro; (Mexico City) Distrito Federal - Stephanie Pavlovich; Durango - Arlene Nevarez; Baja California - Yovana Torres; Baja California Sur - Irina Trasviña; Morelos - Natalia Peréz; Puebla - Irantzú Herrero; Quintana Roo - Erika Aruello; Tamaulipas - Lorena Ramos; Yucatán - Mariana Ancona

=== Order of announcements ===
==== Top 10 ====
1. Jalisco
2. Guanajauto
3. Veracruz
4. Baja California Sur
5. Zacatecas
6. Tamaulipas
7. Puebla
8. Baja California
9. Nuevo León
10. Distrito Federal

==== Top 5 ====
1. Jalisco
2. Baja California Sur
3. Tamaulipas
4. Puebla
5. Nuevo León

=== Preliminary Competition ===
For the third consecutive time, the Preliminary Competition was held at the "Hoy" TV Show a few days before to final competition. Prior to the final telecast, all contestants competed in swimsuit during the preliminary competition, included corporal expression category.

In this program were chosen the Top 20 among the 33 candidates. Only the top 20 participated in the final night. The Preliminary Competition was hosted by Andrea Legarreta and Ernesto Laguardia.

=== Order of announcements ===
In addition, the names of the semifinalists who would compete on the final night they met.

1. Yucatán
2. Baja California
3. Puebla
4. Baja California Sur
5. Tamaulipas
6. Jalisco
7. Baja California Sur
8. Zacatecas
9. Puebla
10. Tamaulipas

1. Durango
2. Baja California
3. Distrito Federal
4. Guanajuato
5. Quintana Roo
6. Veracruz
7. Distrito Federal
8. Morelos
9. Aguascalientes
10. Nuevo León

=== Special awards ===
Award	Contestant
Miss Top Model	Baja California Sur - Daniela Cosio
Contestants' Choice	Tamaulipas - Julia Muñoz
Miss Talent	Puebla - Irantzú Herrero
Miss Sports	Baja California - Marcela Rubio
Miss Academic Award	Yucatán - Mariana Ancona
Miss Photogenic	Nuevo León - Priscila Perales
Best Hair Palmolive Optims	Guanajuato - Ángela Sandoval
Best Skin Palmolive Naturals	(Mexico City) Distrito Federal - Priscila Valles
Fuller Beauty Queen	Nuevo León - Priscila Perales

== Judges ==
=== Preliminary Competition ===
- Blanca Soto - Nuestra Belleza Mundo México 1997 and International Top Model
- Carlos Moreno - TV Producer
- Cecilia Gabriela - Actress
- Lissete Trepaud - OCESA Fashion Manager
- José Quiñones - Fashion Coordinator
- Fefi Mauri - Director of Modeling Agency
- Gustavo Elguera - Designer Accessories

=== Final Competition ===
- Barbára Rubin - Image Coordinator
- Alfonso Waithsman - Makeup Artist
- Leticia Murray - Nuestra Belleza México 1999
- Luis Escoy - Plastic Surgeon
- Laura de la Torre - Fuller Brand Director
- Alán Loranga - Psychotherapist
- Silvia Pinal - Actress & TV Producer
- Juan José Origel - Journalist & TV Host
- Silvia Salgado - Nuestra Belleza México 1998
- Adrián Sánchez - Employer

== Background music ==
- Elefante

== Contestants ==
State	Contestant	Age	Height (m)	Hometown
Aguascalientes	Vanessa Castro Delgado	18	1.68	Aguascalientes
Baja California	Marcela Rubio Villarreal	22	1.74	Mexicali
Baja California	Yovana Torres Ortiz	23	1.70	Tijuana
Baja California Sur	Daniela de Jesus Cosio	19	1.80	La Paz
Baja California Sur	Irina Trasviña Mar	23	1.74	La Paz
Campeche	Sonia Tatúa Castilla	20	1.70	Campeche
Coahuila	Aminé Gómez Reynoso	20	1.70	Torreón
Coahuila	Ana Isabel Muñoz Ortíz	18	1.76	Torreón
Coahuila	Bessie Batarse Moore	21	1.75	Torreón
(Mexico City) Distrito Federal	Priscila Alejandra González Valles	19	1.80	Mexico City
(Mexico City) Distrito Federal	Stephanie Pavlovich Rosas	20	1.74	Mexico City
Durango	Arlene Nevarez Ortega	18	1.74	Durango
(State of Mexico) Estado de México	Tánneke Mariscal Gutiérrez	22	1.73	Toluca
Guanajuato	Ángela Sandoval Cantú	21	1.69	León
Guanajuato	Fernanda Verdín Martínez	19	1.76	León
Jalisco	Ana Paola Sifuentes Gutiérrez	20	1.76	Guadalajara
Jalisco	Karina López Pérez	22	1.78	Jalostotitlán
Michoacán	Vanessa Paredes Soto	23	1.70	Huetamo
Morelos	Natalia Pérez Suárez	22	1.76	Cuernavaca
Nayarit	Yisa Daniela Ortiz Palacios	19	1.70	Tepic
Nuevo León	Silvia Priscila Perales Elizondo	22	1.74	Monterrey
Puebla	Irantzú Herrero Eguíluz	21	1.70	Puebla
Puebla	Karla Verónica Jiménez Amezcua	22	1.69	Puebla
Querétaro	Diana Pereyra San Román	19	1.85	Querétaro
Quintana Roo	Erika Argüello Loria	19	1.68	Chetumal
Sinaloa	Alondra del Carmen Robles Dobler	18	1.75	Mazatlán
Sonora	Ana Patricia Gámez Montes	18	1.73	Navojoa
Sonora	Jazmín Hurtado Parker	20	1.73	Hermosillo
Tamaulipas	Julia Muñoz González	21	1.72	Tampico
Tamaulipas	Lorena Ramos Paredes	20	1.73	Matamoros
Veracruz	Cindy Cajuste Sequeira	22	1.78	Poza Rica
Yucatán	Mariana Ancona García	21	1.77	Mérida
Zacatecas	Diana Karimen Jiménez Pérez	21	1.75	Zacatecas

== Designates ==
- Baja California - Marcela Rubio
- Baja California Sur - Irina Trasviña
- Coahuila - Ana Isabel Muñoz
- (Mexico City) Distrito Federal - Stephanie Pavlovich
- Guanajuato - Angela Sandoval

- Jalisco - Ana Paola Sifuentes
- Puebla - Irantzú Herrero
- Sonora - Ana Patricia González
- Tamaulipas - Julia Muñoz

== Returning states ==
- Last competed in 2002:
  - Morelos
  - Querétaro
  - Quintana Roo

- Last competed in 2003:
  - Aguascalientes
  - (State of Mexico) Estado de México

== Withdrawals ==
- Guerrero
- San Luis Potosí
- Chihuahua

== Significance ==
- Nuevo León won the Nuestra Belleza México title for the third time (before 1997 and 1998).
- Puebla won the Nuestra Belleza Mundo México title for the second time (before 2002).
- Baja California Sur was the Suplente/1st Runner-up for the first time.
- For the third time an Afro-Mexican compete in the Nuestra Belleza México pageant (Cindy Cajuste from Veracruz, before 1999 and 2001).
- For the first time Chihuahua retires from competition.
- Aguascalientes, Estado de México, Puebla, Yucatán and Zacatecas return to competition after two years (2003), and Morelos, Puebla, Querétaro and Quintana Roo after three years (2002).
- Tamaulipas placed for seventh consecutive year.
- Distrito Federal, Jalisco and Nuevo León placed for third consecutive year.
- Zacatecas placed for second consecutive year.
- Baja California Sur and Quintana Roo returned to making calls to the semifinals after five years (2000), Morelos after three years (2002), Aguascalientes, Baja California, Durango, Guanajuato, Puebla, Zacatecas and Yucatán after two years (2003).
- States that were called to the semifinals last year and this year failed to qualify were Coahuila, Michoacán and Veracruz.
- For third consecutive time Ernesto Laguardia hosted Nuestra Belleza México, second time with Silvia Salgado and for the first time with Jacqueline Bracamontes, Paulina Flores, Vilma Zamora and Tania Vázquez.
- Baja California Sur won Miss Top Model for the first time.
- Puebla won Miss Talent for the first time.
- Yucatán won the Academic Award for the first time.
- Tamaulipas won Contestants' Choice award for the first time.
- Baja California won Miss Sports for the first time.
- Nuevo León won Miss Photogenic for third time (before 1997 and 1998).
- Guanajuato won the Best Hair Award for the first time.
- Nuevo León won Fuller Beauty Queen Award for second time (before 2003).
- Distrito Federal won the Skin Hinds Award for the first time.
- The host delegate, Vanessa Castro from Aguascalientes, placed to semifinals.
- Baja California Sur (Daniela Cosio) and Distrito Federal (Priscila González) are the higher delegates in this edition (1.80 m).
- Aguascalientes (Vanessa Castro) and Quintana Roo (Erika Argüello) are the lower delegates in this edition (1.68 m).

== Contestants notes ==
- Aguascalientes - Vanessa Castro after participated she studied at CEA and she appeared on TV Show "Todo el Mundo Cree que Sabe" as Vanessa de Castro.
- Baja California Sur - Daniela Cosio is cousin of Berenice Cosio Nuestra Belleza Baja California Sur 2001. She signed with Major Model Management in New York City and Milan. After acquiring representation, Cosio's modeling portfolio quickly began to expand, and she appeared in international edition of Vogue and Maxim Magazine. As a runway model, she has walked the catwalks for designers such as Marchesa, Guess?, Baby Phat, Chado Ralph Rucci, Mara Hoffman, Project Runway, Georges Hobeika, Iceberg, Marithé François Girbaud, Vivienne Westwood, Betsey Johnson, and Pamella Roland. In 2010 Cosio was featured in Pantene Shine Satisfaction Commercial. Also she represented Mexico in the Reinado Internacional del Café 2006 in Manizales, Colombia. In 2010 Cosio was featured in Pantene Shine Satisfaction Commercial.
- Morelos - Natalia Pérez represented Mexico in Miss Atlántico Internacional 2007 but she didn't place.
- Nayarit - Daniel Ortíz is the local coordinator of Nuestra Belleza Nayarit.
- Nuevo León - Priscila Perales in 2004 participated in her state's pageant Nuestra Belleza Nuevo León and placed 1st Runner-up. Perales competed for the state title again the following year and win the title, becoming her state's representative at the National Competition in 2005, subsequently won the Nuestra Belleza México title. Perales represented her country in Miss Universe 2006, held at the Shrine Auditorium in Los Angeles, California, United States on July 23, 2006. She placed in the Top 10, competing in swimsuit and evening gown. In 2007, after the Nuestra Belleza México organization reobtained the franchise for Miss International, Perales was chosen to be the country's representative in that pageant, held at The Hotel Prince Park Tower in Tokyo, Japan, on October 15, 2007. She was crowned Miss International 2007, becoming Mexico's first representative to win that title. During filming in summer 2010, she starred in Univision's hit soap opera, "Eva Luna", alongside Guy Ecker, Blanca Soto, Susana Dosamantes, Julian Gil, and other actors. In 2012 she appears in the soap opera "Corazón Valiente".
- Puebla - Karla Jiménez obtained the title of Nuestra Belleza Mundo México and she represented her country in Miss World 2006 held at Sala Kongresowa, the main 2,897-seat auditorium at the Palace of Culture and Science in Warsaw, Poland on September 30, 2006. During Miss World, she made the Top 17 Semifinalists. On June 28, 2009 she married with Luis de Llano Stevens, son of producer Luis de Llano.
- Sinaloa - Alondra Robles after one year she was elected Miss Turismo Sinaloa as well as Miss Turismo México 2006 and competed in Miss Tourism Queen International 2006 and Miss International 2006.
- Sonora - Ana Patricia González known as Ana Patricia Gámez at the time (prior to marriage), the 18-year-old represented the state of Sonora in the 2005 edition of Nuestra Belleza México. A few years later, González auditioned for Nuestra Belleza Latina 2010 in Los Angeles, and was selected to participate in that reality show. After weeks of competition and eliminations, she won the grand prize of USD $250,000, a contract with Univision and the title Nuestra Belleza Latina 2010, making her the second Mexican woman to obtain the title, after Alejandra Espinoza in 2007. She also won the 50 Mas Bellos challenge and was featured among People en Español magazine's 50 most beautiful people of 2010.
- Veracruz - Cindy Cajuste was 1st Runner-up in Miss Costa Maya International 2006. She was the third Afro-Mexican to compete in tue Nuestra Belleza México pageant.
- Yucatán - Mariana Ancona is daughter of Ana María García Srita. Turismo Nacional 1980 and Srita. América Latina 1980 who was also the Local Director of Nuestra Belleza Yucatán.
- Zacatecas - Diana Jiménez was selected by Nuestra Belleza México Organization for represent Mexico in the first Miss Continente Americano held in Palacio de Cristal in Guayaquil, Ecuador on 2006, but she didn't place.

=== Crossovers ===
Contestants who had competed or will compete at other beauty pageants:

Miss Universe

- 2006: Nuevo León: Priscila Perales (Top 10)

Miss World

- 2006: Puebla: Karla Jiménez (Top 17)

Miss International

- 2006: Sinaloa: Alondra Robles
- 2007: Nuevo León: Priscila Perales (Winner)

Miss Continente Americano

- 2006: Zacatecas: Diana Jiménez

Miss Atlántico Internacional

- 2007: Morelos: Natalia Pérez

Nuestra Belleza Latina

- 2010: Sonora: Ana Patricia Gámez (Winner)
  - Los Angeles's representative

Miss Tourism Queen International

- 2006: Sinaloa: Alondra Robles

Reinado Internacional del Café

- 2006: Baja California Sur: Daniela Cosio

Miss Costa Maya International

- 2006: Veracruz: Cindy Cajuste (1st Runner-up)

Miss Turismo México

- 2006: Sinaloa: Alondra Robles (Winner)

Nuestra Belleza Nuevo León

- 2004: Nuevo León: Priscila Perales (Suplente)
