= Elisa Nájera =

Mexican TV host, model and beauty pageant titleholder (born 1986)

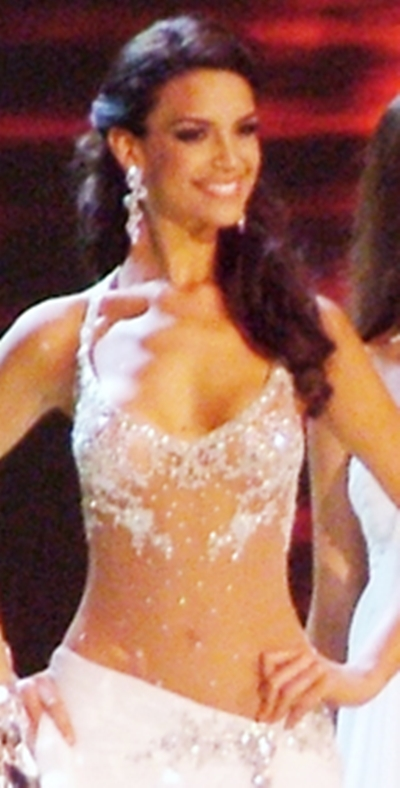
- Born: Elisa Nájera Gualito; August 16, 1986 (age 40); Celaya, Guanajuato, Mexico
- Education: Ingeniería en Infustrias Alimentarias
- Height: 1.83 m (6 ft 0 in)
- Beauty pageant titleholder
- Hair color: Brown
- Eye color: Brown
- Major competitions: Nuestra Belleza Guanajuato 2007 (Winner); Nuestra Belleza México 2007 (Winner); Miss Universe 2008 (4th Runner Up)

Elisa Nájera Gualito (born August 16, 1986, in Celaya, Guanajuato) is a Mexican TV host, model and beauty pageant titleholder who was crowned Nuestra Belleza México on October 5, 2007, in Manzanillo, Colima.

== Pageants ==
Nájera competed against 33 other contestants in the national pageant Nuestra Belleza Mexico, which she won.

On July 2, 2008, beating 79 other contestants, Najera won the "Best in Bikini - Queen Of Vinpearl" special award title, which came with a trophy and US$2,000.

During the final competition of Miss Universe, held on July 13, 2008, Najera placed among the top 15 semi-finalists and competed in swimsuit and evening gown rounds before moving on to the final five, finishing as fourth runner-up to the eventual winner, Miss Venezuela, Dayana Mendoza.

Awards and achievements
Preceded by (United States) Rachel Smith	Miss Universe fourth runner up 2008	Succeeded by (Puerto Rico) Mayra Matos
Preceded by (Sinaloa) Rosa María Ojeda	Nuestra Belleza México; 2007	Succeeded by (Jalisco) Karla Carrillo
Preceded by Pilar Pérez	Nuestra Belleza Guanajuato; 2007	Succeeded by Andrea Martínez
