= Nuestra Belleza México 2001 =

8th edition of Nuestra Belleza México beauty pageant

- Date: September 28, 2001
- Presenters: Lupita Jones, Alexis Ayala
- Entertainment: Wendy Fitzwilliam, Marco Antonio Solis
- Venue: Aeropuerto Internacional "Lic. Adolfo López Mateos", Toluca, Estado de México, Mexico
- Broadcaster: Televisa
- Entrants: 47
- Placements: 20
- Withdrawals: Quintana Roo
- Returns: Aguascalientes, Baja California, Campeche, Durango, Nayarit
- Winner: Ericka Cruz; Yucatán

Nuestra Belleza México 2001, the 8th Nuestra Belleza México pageant, was held at the Aeropuerto Internacional "Lic. Adolfo López Mateos" of Toluca, Estado de México, Mexico on September 28, 2001. Forty-seven contestants of the Mexican Republic competed for the national title, which was won by Ericka Cruz from Yucatán, who later competed in Miss Universe 2002 in Puerto Rico. Cruz was crowned by outgoing Nuestra Belleza México titleholder Jacqueline Bracamontes. She is the first and only Yucateca and the third winner of foreign descent (she is Afro-Mexican) to win this Title.

The Nuestra Belleza Mundo México title was won by Tatiana Rodríguez from Campeche, who later competed in Miss World 2001 in South Africa. Rodríguez was crowned by outgoing Nuestra Belleza Mundo México titleholder Paulina Flores. She is the first and only Campechana to win this Title.

For the second consecutive time and for the fourth time in the history of the pageant, two events were held separately to select the two winners for the titles Nuestra Belleza México and Nuestra Belleza Mundo México.

== Results ==
=== PlaceMents Nuestra Belleza México ===
| Final results | Contestant |
|---|---|
| Nuestra Belleza México 2001 | Yucatán – Ericka Cruz |
| Suplente/1st Runner-up | Coahuila – Greta Galindo |
| 2nd Runner-up | Sonora – Carmen Varela |
| 3rd Runner-up | (Chihuahua (state)) Chihuahua – Nancy Esparza |
| 4th Runner-up | Nuevo León – Diana García |
| Top 10 | Jalisco – Ana Inés Santoyo; Sinaloa – Claudia Collado; Sinaloa – Mónica Psihas; Sonora – Erika Peña; Tamaulipas – Mónica Aragón |
| Top 20 | (Mexico City) Distrito Federal – Gabriela Hurtado; Guanajuato – Anabel Mendoza; Guanajuato – Karín Huerta; Jalisco – Miriam Ayala; Jalisco – Saray Álvarez; Nuevo León – Elsa Burgos; Sinaloa – Alicia León; Sonora – Lizeth Pérez; Veracruz – Adriana Loya; Veracruz – Andrea Pérez |

=== Order of announcements ===
==== Top 10 ====
1. Sinaloa
2. Yucatán
3. Jalisco
4. Chihuahua
5. Sonora
6. Sonora
7. Tamaulipas
8. Coahuila
9. Nuevo León
10. Sinaloa

==== Top five ====
1. Sonora
2. Nuevo León
3. Yucatán
4. Chihuahua
5. Coahuila

=== Nuestra Belleza Mundo México ===
One week before the final competition was held, the semi-final competition featured a live show entitled "Nuestra Belleza Mundo Mexico", in which was announced that the winner of the Nuestra Belleza Mundo México title was Tatiana Rodríguez from Campeche, who represented the country in Miss World 2001. All contestants competed in swimsuit and evening gown during the contest.

The Nuestra Belleza Mundo México pageant was held at the Aeropuerto Internacional "Lic. Adolfo López Mateos" of Toluca, Estado de México and was hosted by Mónica Noguera and Julio Bracho. It was the 4th edition of the "Nuestra Belleza Mundo México" contest as an official separate pageant to choose Mexico's representative to Miss World. From this year onwards, the winner of this event would not compete in the final night competition.

The musical part was enlivened by: Dinastía, Gustavo Lara and Cristian Castro.

| Final results | Contestant |
|---|---|
| Nuestra Belleza Mundo México 2000 | Campeche – Tatiana Rodríguez |
| Suplente/1st Runner-up | Yucatán – Ericka Cruz |
| Top 21 | Coahuila – Greta Galindo; (Chihuahua (state)) Chihuahua – Nancy Esparza; (Mexico City) Distrito Federal – Gabriela Hurtado; Guanajuato – Anabel Mendoza; Guanajuato – Karín Huerta; Jalisco – Ana Inés Santoyo; Jalisco – Miriam Ayala; Jalisco – Saray Álvarez; Nuevo León – Diana García; Nuevo León – Elsa Burgos; Sinaloa – Claudia Collado; Sinaloa – Mónica Psihas; Sinaloa – Alicia León; Sonora – Carmen Varela; Sonora – Erika Peña; Sonora – Lizeth Pérez; Tamaulipas – Mónica Aragón; Veracruz – Adriana Loya; Veracruz – Andrea Pérez |

=== Order of announcements ===
==== Top 21 ====
1. Distrito Federal
2. Coahuila
3. Guanajuato
4. Sonora
5. Veracruz
6. Sonora
7. Sinaloa
8. Jalisco
9. Campeche
10. Veracruz
11. Jalisco
1. Guanajuato
2. Jalisco
3. Tamaulipas
4. Sinaloa
5. Chihuahua
6. Sinaloa
7. Nuevo León
8. Nuevo León
9. Yucatán
10. Sonora

=== Special awards ===
| Award | Contestant |
|---|---|
| Miss Photogenic | (Mexico City) Distrito Federal – Gabriela Hurtado |
| Fuller Beauty Queen | (Mexico City) Distrito Federal – Gabriela Hurtado |
| Best Hair Pantene | Tamaulipas – Mónica Aragón |
| Miss Internet | Tamaulipas – Mónica Aragón |
| Lala Light Figure | Coahuila – Greta Galindo |
| Best National Costume | Yucatán – Ericka Cruz; "Oro Maya" |

== Judges ==
=== Preliminary competition ===
- Guido Quiles – El Modelo México 2000
- Mariana Tazbek – Photographer
- Leonardo Leos – Makeup Artist
- Diana Torrescano – Medical Beauty Director
- Alan Loranka – Astrologer
- Sara Bustani – Fashion Designer
- Jorge Salinas – Actor
- Yessica Salazar – Nuestra Belleza Mundo México 1996 and Actress
- Otto Sirgo – Actor

=== Final competition ===
- Carlos Latapi – Photographer
- Rebeca Tamez – Nuestra Belleza México 1996 & Señorita Continente Americano 1997
- Sabú – Artistic Promoter
- Gabriel Soto – El Modelo México 1996, Singer & Actor
- Raquel Bessudo – Writer
- Valentino Lanús – Actor
- Leonardo Leos – Makeup Artist
- Laura Flores – Actress, Singer & TV Hostess
- Saul Lisazo – Actor

== Background Music ==
- Opening Number: "Nuestra Belleza México" (Official Theme)
- Intermediate: "Call my Bluff" by Wendy Fitzwilliam
- Intermediate: "Si no te Hubieras Ido" and "O me Voy o te Vas" by Marco Antonio Solis
- Crowning Moment: "Nuestra Belleza México" (Official Theme)

== Contestants ==
| State | Contestant | Age | Height (m) | Hometown |
|---|---|---|---|---|
| Aguascalientes | María Isabel Gutiérrez Velazsco | 20 | 1.72 | Calvillo |
| Baja California | Bibian López Vallejo | 24 | 1.68 | Mexicali |
| Baja California | Paulina García Coronel | 23 | 1.68 | Tijuana |
| Baja California Sur | Berenice Cosio Yee | 20 | 1.75 | La Paz |
| Campeche | Tatiana Rodríguez Romero | 20 | 1.74 | Campeche |
| Coahuila | Greta Galindo De la Peña | 20 | 1.79 | Torreón |
| Colima | Laura Tayde Mancilla Alonso | 21 | 1.68 | Colima |
| Colima | María Rosario Meza Anguiano | 23 | 1.77 | Colima |
| Chiapas | Alejandra Paulina Zenteno Gutiérrez | 20 | 1.74 | Tuxtla Gutiérrez |
| (Chihuahua (state)) Chihuahua | Ericka De la Rosa Castro | 20 | 1.71 | Chihuahua |
| (Chihuahua (state)) Chihuahua | Nancy Cecilia Esparza Tinajero | 21 | 1.75 | Chihuahua |
| (Chihuahua (state)) Chihuahua | Ofelia Chávez Moreno | 21 | 1.76 | Chihuahua |
| (Mexico City) Distrito Federal | Gabriela Hurtado González | 23 | 1.70 | México City |
| Durango | Jennifer López Rateike | 22 | 1.75 | Durango |
| (State of Mexico) Estado de México | Eva Geynes Gutiérrez | 24 | 1.68 | Toluca |
| Guanajuato | Anabel Mendoza Muñoz | 21 | 1.73 | León |
| Guanajuato | Claudia Albo López | 20 | 1.71 | Irapuato |
| Guanajuato | Karín Elizabeth Huerta Arredondo | 23 | 1.69 | Irapuato |
| Guanajuato | Leticia Vanessa Jiménez | 21 | 1.73 | Guanajuato |
| (Hidalgo (state)) Hidalgo | Sara Guadalupe García Amador | 21 | 1.73 | Pachuca |
| Jalisco | Ana Inés Santoyo Jasso | 22 | 1.73 | Guadalajara |
| Jalisco | Miriam Ayala Núñez | 23 | 1.73 | Guadalajara |
| Jalisco | Saray Alejandra Álvarez Negrete | 21 | 1.77 | Guadalajara |
| Morelos | Belly Lizene Corona Velazco | 22 | 1.73 | Cuernavaca |
| Nayarit | Claudia Isabel Fernández Medina | 23 | 1.68 | Tepic |
| Nuevo León | Diana Cristina García Soto | 20 | 1.70 | Monterrey |
| Nuevo León | Elsa Lucía Burgos Pérez | 22 | 1.72 | Monterrey |
| Puebla | Karla Estela Gómez Monetti | 23 | 1.68 | Puebla |
| Querétaro | Paulina Vázquez Miranda | 20 | 1.69 | Querétaro |
| San Luis Potosí | Claudia Calvillo Martínez | 23 | 1.74 | San Luis Potosí |
| Sinaloa | Claudia Collado Careaga | 21 | 1.75 | Los Mochis |
| Sinaloa | Mónica Psihas González | 21 | 1.68 | Culiacán |
| Sinaloa | Rosa Alicia León Soto | 22 | 1.74 | Mazatlán |
| Sonora | Carmen Valeria Leyva | 20 | 1.75 | Cd. Obregón |
| Sonora | Erika Peña Ramírez | 21 | 1.78 | Hermosillo |
| Sonora | Lizeth Pérez Rodarte | 24 | 1.80 | Guaymas |
| Tabasco | Alejandra Priego Canto | 20 | 1.68 | Villahermosa |
| Tamaulipas | María Alicia Rojas Lozano | 22 | 1.70 | Tampico |
| Tamaulipas | Mónica Aragón Herrera | 21 | 1.74 | Tampico |
| Tlaxcala | Aline Mónica Luna Ramírez | 21 | 1.76 | Apizaco |
| Veracruz | Adriana Loya Páez | 21 | 1.77 | Veracruz |
| Veracruz | Andrea Pérez Verdera | 21 | 1.77 | Xalapa |
| Veracruz | Arumi Esmeralda Vargas Andrade | 20 | 1.70 | Poza Rica |
| Veracruz | María Andrea Macías Azuara | 20 | 1.77 | Tempoal |
| Veracruz | Valeria Loya Herrera | 20 | 1.71 | Tuxpan |
| Yucatán | Ericka Yadira Cruz Escalante | 20 | 1.78 | Merida |
| Zacatecas | Noemí Dolores de la Torre Belmontes | 21 | 1.70 | Zacatecas |

== Designates ==
- Baja California – Paulina García
- Colima – Rosario Meza
- Chihuahua – Ericka Castro
- Chihuahua – Ofelia Chávez
- Guanajuato – Claudia Albo
- Guanajuato – Karín Huerta
- Guanajuato – Letícia Jiménez
- Jalisco – Sarahí Álvarez
- Jalisco – Ana Inés Santoyo
- Nuevo León – Elsa Burgos
- Sinaloa – Claudia Collado
- Sinaloa – Mónica Psihas
- Sonora – Carmén Valera
- Sonora – Lizeth Pérez
- Tamaulipas – Alicia Rojas
- Veracruz – Adriana Loya
- Veracruz – Arumi Vargas
- Veracruz – Andrea Macías
- Veracruz – Valeria Loya

== Returning states ==
- Last competed in 1999:
  - Aguascalientes
  - Baja California
  - Campeche
  - Durango
  - Nayarit

== Withdrawals ==
- Quintana Roo

== Historical significance ==
- Yucatán won the Nuestra Belleza México title for the first time.
- This was the third time a Winner of Nuestra Belleza México pageant is of foreign descent (Ericka Cruz is Afro-Mexican).
- Camepeche won the Nuestra Belleza Mundo México title for the first time.
- Coahuila was the Suplente/1st Runner-up for the first time.
- For the second time an Afro-Mexican compete in the Nuestra Belleza México pageant (Ericka Cruz from Yucatán, before 1999).
- For the second consecutive year held two competitions, one semi-final (Nuestra Belleza Mundo México) and the final competition (Nuestra Belleza México).
- Like last year, 21 delegates were chosen to participate in the final competition, but the winner of the semi-final competition wasn't involved in the final night because she started her preparation to compete in Miss World 2001.
- That was the year with more candidates in the contest (47 Contestants).
- For the first time Quintana Roo retires from competition.
- Aguascalientes, Baja California, Campeche, Durango and Nayarit return to competition after two years (1999).
- Distrito Federal and Nuevo León placed for the eighth consecutive year.
- Chihuahua placed for the fourth consecutive year.
- Sinaloa, Sonora and Tamaulipas placed for the third consecutive year.
- Coahuila, Jalisco, Veracruz and Yucatán placed for the second consecutive year.
- Guanajuato returned to making calls to the semi-finals after two years (1999), while Campeche after four years (1997).
- States that were called to the semi-finals last year and this year failed to qualify were Baja California Sur, Colima, Querétaro, San Luis Potosí and Zacatecas.
- For the first time Alexis Ayala hosted the pageant with Lupita Jones.
- Distrito Federal won Miss Photogenic and Fuller Beauty Queen for the first time.
- Tamaulipas won the Best Hair Award for second time (before 1999) and Miss Internet for the first time.
- Coahuila won the Lala Light Figure Award for the first time.
- Yucatán won the Best National Costume for the first time.
- The host delegate, Eva Geynes from the Estado de México, failed to place in the semi-finals.
- Sonora (Lizeth Pérez) is the tallest delegate in this edition (1.80 m).
- Baja California (Bibian López and Paulina García), Colima (Laura Mancilla), Estado de México (Eva Geynes), Nayarit (Claudia Fernández), Puebla (Karla Gómez), Sinaloa (Mónica Psihas), Tabasco (Alejandra Priego) and Tamaulipas (Mónica Aragón) are the shortest delegates in this edition (1.68 m).

== Contestant notes ==
- Baja California Sur – Berenice Cosio Nuestra Belleza Baja California Sur 2001 is cousin of Daniela Cosio Nuestra Belleza Baja California Sur 2005.
- Campeche – Tatiana Rodríguez competed in Miss World 2001, held on November 16, 2001, at the Super Bowl, in Sun City Entertainment Centre, Sun City, South Africa but she didn't place. Also, she participated in the famous reality show Big Brother México, and today is a television hostess and actress.
- Coahuila – Greta Galindo competed in Reina Internacional de las Flores 2002 but she didn't place.
- Chihuahua – Ofelia Chávez competed in Miss Atlántico Internacional 2003.
- Nuevo León – Diana García is dedicated to the cinema where she participated in productions such as: "Casi Divas" and "Amar", among others. She has participated in soap operas like "Top Models" and special events such as "Adelantadas al Mundial" to Foxlife chain in 2006. She has made music videosr with Reik, Sin Bandera, Moenia, Eduardo Cruz, among others. It has also led film festivals: International Film Festival Guanajuato 2007 and 2008 and International Film Festival Monterrey 2008. She has made numerous television commercials.
- Nuevo León – Elsa Burgos was selected by the Organization to represent Mexico in the international contest Miss Costa Maya International 2002 in Belize where she won first place. She was hostess of the program shows Ellas con las Estrellas (Them with the stars). She is a TV Hostess in Monterrey, Nuevo León.
- Sinaloa – Claudia Collado competed in Miss Atlántico Internacional 2002.
- Sonora – Erika Peña represented Mexico in Queen Mayan World 2001 where she won first Place.
- Tamaulipas – Mónica Aragón represented Mexico in the Reinado Internacional del Café 2002 in Medellín, Colombia. Also she is sister of Rosa María Aragón, Nuestra Belleza Tamaulipas 1999.
- Yucatán – Ericka Cruz represented her country in Miss Universe 2002 held in Coliseo Roberto Clemente in San Juan, Puerto Rico on May 29, 2002, but she didn't place. She was the first Afro-Mexican to represent Mexico in Miss Universe history and the second Afro-Mexican to compete in the Nuestra Belleza México pageant. In 2010. she was crowned Reina del Carnaval 2010 in Mérida, Yucatán.

=== Crossovers ===
Contestants who previously competed or will compete at other beauty pageants:

Miss Universe

- 2002: Yucatán: Ericka Cruz

Miss World

- 2001: Campeche: Tatiana Rodríguez

Miss Atlántico Internacional

- 2002: Sinaloa: Claudia Collado
- 2003: Chihuahua: Ofelia Chávez

Reinado Internacional de las Flores

- 2002: Coahuila: Greta Galindo

Reinado Internacional del Café

- 2002: Tamaulipas: Mónica Aragón

Miss Costa Maya International

- 2002: Nuevo León: Elsa Burgos (Winner)

Queen Mayan World

- 2001: Sonora: Erika Peña (Winner)

Reina del Carnaval Mérida

- 2010: Yucatán: Ericka Cruz (Winner)
