= Carolina Morán =

Mexican beauty pageant contestant (born 1987)

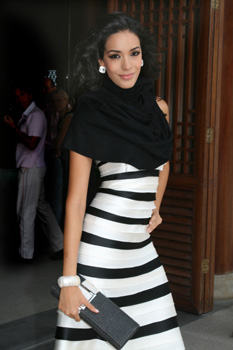
- Born: Carolina Morán Gordillo; December 30, 1987 (age 38); Manzanillo, Colima, Mexico
- Height: 1.78 m (5 ft 10 in)
- Beauty pageant titleholder
- Hair color: Black
- Eye color: Brown
- Major competitions: Nuestra Belleza Colima 2006 (Winner); Nuestra Belleza México 2006 (Nuestra Belleza Mundo México); Miss World 2007 (2nd runner-up) (Miss World Americas)

Carolina Morán Gordillo (born 30 December 1987) is a Mexican actress, model and beauty pageant titleholder who placed as the second runner-up in the 57th Miss World pageant on December 1, 2007, in Sanya, China.

Morán, who stands 1.78 m tall, competed in the national beauty pageant Nuestra Belleza México, held in Tampico, Tamaulipas on September 2, 2006, and obtained the title of Miss Mexico World after placing second to Rosa María Ojeda of the state of Sinaloa. She placed third (second runner-up) in the 2007 Miss World pageant, obtaining the title of Miss World Americas 2007. The pageant winner was Zhang Zilin of China.

Awards and achievements
Preceded by (Brazil) Jane Borges	Miss World Americas; 2007	Succeeded by (Venezuela) Hannelly Quintero
Preceded by (Australia) Sabrina Houssami	Miss World 2nd Runner-Up; 2007	Succeeded by (Trinidad and Tobago) Gabrielle Walcott
