= Daniela Cosío =

Mexican model

Daniela de Jesús Cosío
- Born: January 11, 1986 (age 40); La Paz, Baja California Sur, Mexico
- Modeling information
- Height: 1.79 m (5 ft 10 1/2 in)
- Hair color: Brown
- Eye color: Green
- Agency: New York Model Management (New York); MP Paris (Paris); Modellink (Gothenburg); MGM Models (Hamburg); Paragon Model Management (Mexico City); MP Miami (Miami)

Daniela de Jesús Cosío (born January 11, 1986) is a Mexican model and beauty pageant titleholder. She began modeling after participating in the national beauty pageant Nuestra Belleza Mexico 2005, where she placed as the runner-up.

== Early life ==
She was born on January 11, 1986, in La Paz, Baja California Sur, Mexico. She has a brother Noel Abraham.

== Career ==
She was contracted by Major Model Management in New York City and Milan. She subsequently appeared in international editions of Vogue and Maxim. As a runway model, she walked for designers such as Marchesa, Guess?, Baby Phat, Chado Ralph Rucci, Mara Hoffman, Jean Paul Gaultier, Georges Hobeika, Iceberg, Marithé François Girbaud, Vivienne Westwood, Betsey Johnson, and Pamella Roland. In 2010, Cosio was featured in Pantene Shine Satisfaction commercial. Daniela was in the ad campaigns for Express' Spring/Summer 2012 collection Express Loyalty Fragrance Men's Fragrance S/S 2012, Love Express Fragrance Fragrance Campaign S/S 2012 Models.com ranked Cosio at number 25 on its "Money Girls" list.

== Advertisements ==
Abercrombie & Fitch, Antica Murrina, Aubade, Ava Strahl, Chilly, Clarins, Demetrios International, Eckō Unltd., Timepieces, Express, Express 'Love Express' fragrance, Express 'Loyalty' fragrance, Fiorucci, Goldenpoint, Guess?, Henry Cotton's, L'Oreal, La Senza, Lorimar, Marsel, Newport Polarized, Pantene, Penti, Philippe Matignon, Ralph Lauren 'Big Pony' fragrances, Victoria's Secret, Vinni ad Yamamay.

== Magazine Covers ==
Vogue Gioiello - 2007; Maxim - April 2008; Grazia - January 2009 Mexico: Balance - 2006 Spain: Beauty Forum - May 2010 US: Simply the Best - January/February 2007; Palm Beach Illustrated - April 2007
