= Rosa María Ojeda =

Mexican beauty pageant contestant

- Born: Rosa María Ojeda Cuén; October 15, 1986 (age 39); Culiacán, Sinaloa, Mexico
- Height: 5 ft 8.5 in (1.74 m)
- Beauty pageant titleholder
- Title: Nuestra Belleza México 2006
- Hair color: Black
- Eye color: Brown
- Major competitions: Nuestra Belleza Sinaloa 2006 (Winner); Nuestra Belleza México 2006 (Winner); Miss Universe 2007 (Top 10)

Rosa María Ojeda Cuen (born October 15, 1986, in Culiacán, Sinaloa) is a Mexican model and beauty pageant titleholder who won the title Miss Mexico 2006. She also represented Mexico at the 56th annual Miss Universe 2007, and where placed in the Top 10, pageant held at the National Auditorium in Mexico City, Mexico.

== Biography ==
Rosa María Ojeda Cuen is the youngest of five children. Her two oldest brothers died (merely three years after one another) when Ojeda was very young, and at 15 years of age, she was diagnosed thyroid cancer. After overcoming these events during her childhood, Ojeda competed in the national beauty pageant Nuestra Belleza México, held in Tampico, Tamaulipas on September 2, 2006, where she beat 30 other contestants to win the title, as well as obtain the right to represent her country in the 2007 Miss Universe pageant. She became the second woman from the state of Sinaloa to win the title since the Nuestra Belleza Mexico pageant first began in 1994. During the pageant week she was asked who was she closest to among all the 77 contestants, she said she had fun with all of them but felt closest to Xiomara Blandino, Miss Nicaragua 2007 her roommate and who also was in the top 10. On May 28, 2007, Ojeda placed as a Top 10 finalist in Miss Universe 2007 held in Mexico City. Riyo Mori of Japan was eventually crowned the winner.

=== National Costume controversy ===
In April 2007, controversy erupted over the proposed national costume of Rosa María Ojeda, Miss Mexico. The skirt of the costume depicted scenes from the Cristero War, a Roman Catholic rebellion in the 1920s in which thousands of people were killed, including hangings. The outfit included a bullet-studded belt and crucifix necklace. The design was chosen from over thirty others and had been intended to show Mexico's culture and history, but it elicited controversy amid claims it was in poor taste and inappropriate. Pageant owners said that the costume would be redesigned to include image of the Virgin of Guadalupe.

Preceded by Priscila Perales	Nuestra Belleza México; 2006	Succeeded by Elisa Nájera
