= Karla Jiménez =

Mexican beauty pageant titleholder (born 1982)

Karla Verónica Jiménez Amezcua (born December 15, 1982, in Puebla City, Mexico) is a Mexican beauty pageant titleholder who represented her country in the 2006 Miss World pageant, held in Warsaw, Poland on September 30, 2006.

Prior to competing in Miss World, Jiménez was chosen as her state's representative to the national pageant Nuestra Belleza México, held on September 2, 2005, in the state of Aguascalientes. Placing second to Priscila Perales of Nuevo León, who became Miss Mexico Universe, Jiménez obtained the title of Miss Mexico World. During Miss World, she finished as one of the top 17 semi-finalists.

Awards and achievements
Preceded by Dafne Molina	Nuestra Belleza Mundo México; 2005	Succeeded by Carolina Morán
