= Priscila Perales =

Mexican actress, model (born 1983)

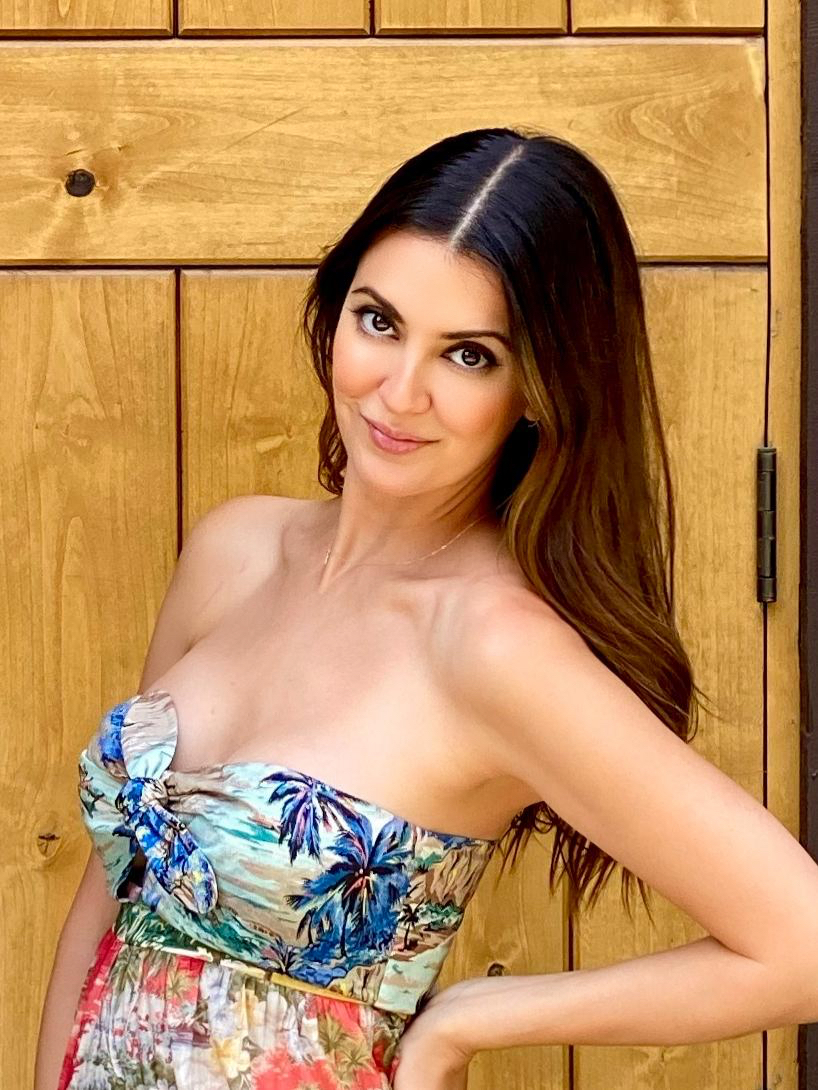
- Born: Silvia Priscila Perales Elizondo; February 24, 1983 (age 43); Monterrey, Nuevo León, Mexico
- Occupations: Actress, Author, Spokesperson, Model
- Height: 1.74 m (5 ft 9 in)
- Spouse: Adrián Fernández (m. 2018)
- Beauty pageant titleholder
- Hair color: Brown
- Eye color: Brown
- Major competitions: Nuestra Belleza Nuevo León 2005 (Winner); Nuestra Belleza México 2005 (Winner); Miss Universe 2006 (Top 10); Miss International 2007 (Winner)

Silvia Priscila Perales Elizondo (born February 24, 1983) is a Mexican model, actress and beauty pageant titleholder She was crowned Nuestra Belleza México 2005. She was a top 10 semifinalist in the Miss Universe 2006 pageant. The following year, she became the first Mexican to win the title of Miss International in 2007.

After competing in beauty pageants, Priscila debuted as an actress in Hispanic soap operas with Univision and Telemundo television networks in Miami, Florida, where she currently resides. She retired from modeling in 2014 and married race car driver Adrián Fernández in 2018.

== Early life ==
Perales born on 24 February 1983 in Monterrey, Nuevo León, Mexico to Mexican parents Jesús Perales and Sylvia Elizondo. She has a younger brother, Jesus Perales Elizondo. She was raised in the neighborhood of San Pedro Garza García where she lived until 2008. She studied elementary, middle school and high school in the American School Foundation of Monterrey (ASFM). As a teen she did local modeling and studied a Communications Major in the University of Monterrey (UDEM) falling one semester short of graduating, given she won the Miss Mexico title in 2005 and moved to Mexico City for training, in preparation for the Miss Universe pageant.

== Pageant career ==
Priscila began competing in beauty pageants at the age of 21 in her hometown of Monterrey. She won her first title of Nuestra Belleza Nuevo León 2005 on July 11, 2005, which led her to compete nationally for the Miss Mexico title. On September 2, 2005, she went on to win the title of Nuestra Belleza México 2005 in Aguascalientes, Aguascalientes, Mexico giving her the right to represent her country in the 55th edition of the Miss Universe 2006 pageant held at the Shrine Auditorium in Los Angeles, California on July 23, 2006. Perales made it to the top ten finalists in the Miss Universe competition.

A year later, she competed once again in the international scene, representing her country in the 47th edition of the Miss International 2007 beauty pageant. Priscila became the first Mexican to win this title, beating out the 61 other contestants from all over the world on October 15, 2007, at The Prince Park Tower in Minato, Tokyo, Japan. She is also the second Mexican woman to win all mayor international beauty pageants after Lupita Jones in Miss Universe 1991 after 16 years.

== Acting career ==
Before pursuing an acting career, Priscila worked as a news anchor in Televisa Monterrey (Grupo Televisa). Later, she studied acting in a UCLA Extension program in Los Angeles, California in 2009. After a year of studying and casting for acting roles, she was offered her acting debut in the Hispanic soap opera Eva Luna produced by the Univision and Venevision TV networks in 2010 in Miami, Florida where she moved to start her acting career. After her successful role in this production, Priscila remained in Miami as she was offered more TV roles in Telemundo TV series productions such as Corazon Valiente portraying the character of Nelly Balbuena, Pasion Prohibida portraying the character of Eliana Ramírez, and Reina de Corazones portraying the character of Delfina Ortiz.

== Personal life ==
After almost five years of acting in television productions, Priscila decided to retire to pursue other interests and got certified as a holistic nutritionist by the Institute for Integrative Nutrition (IIN) in 2015. An avid writer, she also published her first book Priscila, Queen of My Destiny in 2012 and published her second book Transcendent Love: A Metaphysical Perspective in 2018.

She met longtime boyfriend, the retired race car driver Adrián Fernández, on November 1, 2012, through a mutual friend in Miami, Florida and they got married later in Miami Beach, Florida (May 4, 2018). The couple live in Miami with their son Adrián Fernández Jr. born on October 29, 2020. Currently, Priscila is dedicated to her family and shares holistic lifestyle videos too.

== Filmography ==
=== Film ===
Year	Title	Role	Notes
2015	El justiciero	Sofía	Debut film

=== Television ===
Year	Title	Role	Notes
2010-2011	Eva Luna	Liliana Solís	Television debut
2012	Corazón valiente	Nelly Balbuena	Recurring role
2013	Pasión prohibida	Eliana Ramírez	Recurring role
2014	Reina de corazones	Delfina Ortíz	Recurring role

== Books ==
- Priscila, Queen of My Destiny. Priscila Perales. 2012. ISBN 978-1105296147.
- Trascendent Love: A Metaphysical Perspective. Create Space. 2018. ISBN 978-0692937730.

Awards and achievements
Preceded by (Venezuela) Daniela di Giacomo	Miss International; 2007	Succeeded by (Spain) Alejandra Andreu
Preceded by (Tamaulipas) Laura Elizondo	Nuestra Belleza México; 2005	Succeeded by (Sinaloa) Rosa María Ojeda
Preceded by Ana Paola de la Parra	Nuestra Belleza Nuevo León; 2005	Succeeded by Mariana Lombard
