= Miss Chihuahua =

- Formation: 2016
- Type: Beauty Pageant
- Headquarters: Ciudad Juárez
- Location: Mexico
- Local Coordinator: Conny Blanco

Miss Chihuahua is a state-level contest in the state of Chihuahua, Mexico, which selects the state representative for the national contest Miss México, thus aspiring to represent the country internationally on one of the platforms offered.

The state organization has achieved the following results since 2016:

- Winner: 2 (2016, 2018)
- 2nd Runner-up: 1 (2023)
- Top 10/11: 1 (2017)
- Top 16: 2 (2021, 2025)
- Unplaced: 1 (2019)

== National Queens ==
- Luisana Alderete - Miss México Elite 2025 (Designated)
- Ahley Alvídrez - Miss Mexico 2019
- Andrea Sáenz - Miss México Continentes Unidos 2018 (Designated)
- Andrea Meza - Miss Mexico 2017

== International Queens ==
- Andrea Sáenz - Miss Continentes Unidos 2018
- Andrea Meza - Miss World Americas 2017

== Titleholders ==
The following are the names of the annual winners of Miss Chihuahua, listed in ascending order, as well as their results during the national Miss México pageant. State queens who represented the country in a current or past franchise of the national organization are also highlighted in a specific color.

Current Franchises:

- Competed at Miss World.
- Competed at Miss Supranational.
- Competed at Miss Cosmo.
- Competed at Miss Elite.
- Competed at Top Model of the World.
- Competed at Reina Internacional del Café.
- Competed at Reina Mundial del Banano.
- Competed at Miss Continentes Unidos.
- Competed at Miss Global City.

Former Franchises:

- Competed at Miss Grand International.
- Competed at Miss Costa Maya International.

Year	Titleholder	Hometown	Placement	Special Award	Notes
2026	Yadalthy Leslie de la Rosa Domínguez	Chihuahua	TBD		
2025	Carla Alejandra de los Reyes Villegas	Ciudad Juárez	Top 16	-	-
2024	Due to changes in the dates of the national pageant, the election of the state queens was postponed for this year.				
2023	Luisana García Alderete	Camargo	2nd Runner-up	Flame Challenge	Will compete at Miss Elite 2026; Miss México Elite 2025; Competed at Miss Globe México 2020; Miss Teen Globe Chihuahua 2020
2022	Due to changes in the dates of the national pageant, the election of the state queens was postponed for this year.				
2021	Celeste Espinoza Portillo	Parral	Top 16	-	Competed at Nuestra Belleza México 2016; Nuestra Belleza Chihuahua 2015
2020	Due to the contingency of COVID-19 there was a lag in the year of the state contest				
2019	Isela Serrano Hernández	Ciudad Juárez	-	-	She contracted COVID-19 during the competition
2018	Ashley Alvídrez Estrada	Ciudad Juárez	Miss México	-	Top 12 at Miss World 2019; Competed at Miss El Paso Texas USA 2017; Competed at Miss El Paso Texas Teen USA 2016; First Mexican-american born in El Paso, Texas
2017	Yamil Andrea Sáenz Castillo	Cuauhtémoc	Top 10	5K Race Challenge	Top 25 at Miss Supranational 2025; Miss México Supranational 2025; Miss Continentes Unidos 2018; Miss México Continentes Unidos 2018; Face of Beauty México 2016; Miss Petite Universe Chihuahua 2016; 1st Runner-up at Miss Chihuahua 2016
2016	Alma Andrea Meza Carmona	Chihuahua	Miss México	Miss Sports	Miss Universe 2020; Mexicana Universal 2020; Mexicana Universal 2019; Miss World Americas 2017; 1st Runner-up at Miss World 2017; Competed at Señorita UACH 2015

== See also ==
- Mexicana Universal Chihuahua
