= Miss Estado de México =

State-level contest in Estado de México, Mexico

- Formation: 2016
- Type: Beauty Pageant
- Headquarters: Toluca
- Location: Mexico
- Local Coordinator: Mario Rico & Kristopeher Noriega

Miss Estado de México is a state-level contest in the state of Estado de México, Mexico, which selects the state representative for the national contest Miss México, thus aspiring to represent the country internationally on one of the platforms offered.

The state organization has achieved the following results since 2016:

- Winner: 1 (2018)
- 4th Runner-up: 1 (2025)
- Top 5/6: 1 (2017)
- Top 16: 1 (2023)
- Unplaced: 3 (2016, 2019, 2021)

== National Queens ==
- María Malo - Miss México Grand 2019

== Titleholders ==
The following are the names of the annual winners of Miss Estado de México, listed in ascending order, as well as their results during the national Miss México pageant. State queens who represented the country in a current or past franchise of the national organization are also highlighted in a specific color.

Current Franchises:

- Competed at Miss World.
- Competed at Miss Supranational.
- Competed at Miss Cosmo.
- Competed at Miss Elite.
- Competed at Top Model of the World.
- Competed at Reina Internacional del Café.
- Competed at Reina Mundial del Banano.
- Competed at Miss Continentes Unidos.
- Competed at Miss Global City.

Former Franchises:

- Competed at Miss Grand International.
- Competed at Miss Costa Maya International.

Year	Titleholder	Hometown	Placement	Special Award	Notes
2026	Melanie Loredo	Texcoco	TBD		
2025	María Fernanda Serrano Barrera	Coacalco	4th Runner-up	Beauty with a Purpose	Top 12 at Miss México Cosmo 2025
2024	Due to changes in the dates of the national pageant, the election of the state queens was postponed for this year.				
2023	Gisset Licona	Coacalco	Top 16	-	-
2022	Due to changes in the dates of the national pageant, the election of the state queens was postponed for this year.				
2021	Frida Sofía Cancino Burgueño	Metepec	-	-	Top 10 at Miss México Supranational 2023
2020	Due to the contingency of COVID-19 there was a lag in the year of the state contest				
2019	Perla del Consuelo Franco Ayala	Villa Guerrero	-	-	Top 12 at Miss Intercontinental México 2024; Miss Intercontinental Morelos 2024; Competed at Mexicana Universal Estado de México 2023; 1st Runner-up at Embajadora México 2022; Embajadora Estado de México 2022; Reina de las Fiestas Patrias de Villa Guerrero 2016
2018	María Malo Juvera Raimond Kedilhac	Huixquilucan	Miss México Grand	Best National Costume	Top 10 at Miss Universe México 2024; Miss Universe Ciudad de México 2024; 1st Runner-up at Miss Grand International 2019; Top 5 at Miss México 2018; Miss Estado de México 2017
2017	María Malo Juvera Raimond Kedilhac	Huixquilucan	Top 5	-	Top 10 at Miss Universe México 2024; Miss Universe Ciudad de México 2024; 1st Runner-up at Miss Grand International 2019; Miss México Grand 2019; Miss Estado de México 2018
2016	Leylany Arce Richard (Resigned)	Naucalpan	Did not Compete	-	Señorita Estado de México 2015
2016	Eva Liliana Velázquez (Assumed)	Naucalpan	-	-	3rd Runner-up at Miss Piel Dorada México 2016; Miss Piel Dorada Distrito Federal 2016

== See also ==
- Mexicana Universal Estado de México
