= Miss Tamaulipas =

Beauty pageant in Tamaulipas, Mexico

- Formation: 2016
- Type: Beauty pageant
- Headquarters: Tampico
- Location: Mexico
- Local Coordinator: Enrique Luna

Miss Tamaulipas is a state-level contest in the state of Tamaulipas, Mexico, which selects the state representative for the national contest Miss México, thus aspiring to represent the country internationally on one of the platforms offered.

The state organization has achieved the following results since 2016:

- 3rd Runner-up: 1 (2023)
- Top 16: 2 (2016, 2021)
- Unplaced: 3 (2017, 2018, 2019, 2025)

== Titleholders ==
The following are the names of the annual winners of Miss Tamaulipas, listed in ascending order, as well as their results during the national Miss México pageant. State queens who represented the country in a current or past franchise of the national organization are also highlighted in a specific color.

Current Franchises:

- Competed at Miss World.
- Competed at Miss Supranational.
- Competed at Miss Cosmo.
- Competed at Miss Elite.
- Competed at Top Model of the World.
- Competed at Reina Internacional del Café.
- Competed at Reina Mundial del Banano.
- Competed at Miss Continentes Unidos.
- Competed at Miss Global City.

Former Franchises:

- Competed at Miss Grand International.
- Competed at Miss Costa Maya International.

Year	Titleholder	Hometown	Placement	Special Award	Notes
2026	Marcela Delgado Sánchez	Nuevo Laredo	TBD		Top 15 at Miss Universe Latina 2025; Competed at Miss Universe Mexico 2024; Miss Universe Tamaulipas 2024; 2nd Runner-up at Teen Universe México 2023; Teen Universe Tamaulipas 2022
2025	Gisella Flores	González	-	-	Will compete at Miss Universe Mexico 2026; Miss Universe Tamaulipas 2026; Top 12 at Miss México Cosmo 2025; Competed at Miss Ultra Universe 2023; Miss Ultra Universe Riviera Maya 2023; Reina Latina Internacional 2023; Embajadora Lider México 2021; Embajadora Jalisco 2021; Competed at Señorita Turismo Atotonilco el Alto 2018
2024	In 2024, due to changes in the dates of the national pageant, the election of the state queens was postponed for one year.				
2023	Carla Karen Barrientos Castillo	Tampico	3rd Runner-up	-	Competed at Miss Mesoamerica International 2023; Miss Mesoamerica México 2023; Embajadora Tamaulipas 2022; 1st Runner-up at Miss Tamaulipas 2018
2022	In 2022, due to changes in the dates of the national pageant, the election of the state queens was postponed for one year.				
2021	Michelle Kersaint Torres Ugarte	Tampico	Top 16	English Challenge	3rd Runner-up at Miss México Supranational 2023; Top 8 at Teen Universe México 2017; Teen Universe Tamaulipas 2017; First afrodescendant from Tamaulipas
2020	In 2020, due to the contingency of COVID-19 there was a lag in the year of the state contest				
2019	Naila Navarro Vázquez	San Fernando	-	-	-
2018	Thalía Vázquez Román	Reynosa	-	-	1st Runner-up at Embajadora México 2021; Embajadora Querétaro 2021
2017	Xaviera Ayala Castillo	Ciudad Madero	-	-	Top 15 at Miss Intercontinental México 2018; Miss Intercontinental Tamaulipas 2018
2016	Claudia Patricia Morato García	Matamoros	Top 16	Miss Talent	Top 16 at Mexicana Universal 2020; Mexicana Universal Tamaulipas 2019; Top 10 at Miss Tourism International 2018; Miss Tourism International México 2018; Top 15 at Miss México Grand 2017; 1st Runner-up at Nuestra Belleza Tamaulipas 2016; 1st Runner-up at Nuestra Belleza Tamaulipas 2012

== See also ==
- Mexicana Universal Tamaulipas
