= Mexicana Universal Morelos =

- Formation: 1994 (as Nuestra Belleza Morelos); 2017 (as Mexicana Universal Morelos)
- Type: Beauty Pageant
- Headquarters: Cuernavaca
- Location: Mexico
- Local Coordinator: Luis Vázquez

Mexicana Universal Morelos (until 2016 called Nuestra Belleza Morelos) is a state-level contest in the state of Morelos, Mexico, which selects the state representative for the national contest Mexicana Universal (formerly called Nuestra Belleza México), thus aspiring to represent the country internationally on one of the platforms offered.

The state organization has achieved the following results since 1994:

- Winner: 2 (1997, 2013)
- 1st Runner-up: 1 (2002)
- 2nd Runner-up: 1 (1999)
- Top 10/11/12: 3 (2007, 2012, 2025)
- Top 15/16: 4 (1994, 2010, 2011, 2014)
- Top 20/21: 2 (2005, 2018)
- Unplaced: 16 (1995, 1996, 1998, 2000, 2001, 2003, 2004, 2006, 2008, 2009, 2015, 2016, 2017, 2019, 2021, 2022, 2023)
- Absencess: 1 (2004)

== National Queens ==
- Daniela Álvarez - Nuestra Belleza Mundo México 2013
- Lorenza Bernot - Nuestra Belleza Internacional México 2008 (Designated)
- Graciela Soto - Nuestra Belleza Internacional México 1999 (Designated)
- Blanca Soto - Miss Verano México 1998 (Designated)
- Blanca Soto - Nuestra Belleza Mundo México 1997

== International Queens ==
- Blanca Soto - Miss Verano Viña del Mar 1998

== Titleholders ==
The following are the names of the annual winners of Mexicana Universal Morelos, listed in ascending order, as well as their results during the national Mexicana Universal pageant. State queens who represented the country in a current or past franchise of the national organization are also highlighted in a specific color.

Current Franchises:

- Competed at Miss Grand International.
- Competed at Miss International.
- Competed at Miss Charm.
- Competed at Reina Hispanoamericana.
- Competed at Miss Orb International.
- Competed at Nuestra Latinoamericana Universal.

Former Franchises:

- Competed at Miss Universe.
- Competed at Miss World.
- Competed at Miss Continente Americano.
- Competed at Miss Costa Maya International.
- Competed at Miss Atlántico Internacional.
- Competed at Miss Verano Viña del Mar.
- Competed at Reina Internacional del Café.
- Competed at Reina Internacional de las Flores.
- Competed at Señorita Continente Americano.
- Competed at Nuestra Belleza Internacional.

Year	Titleholder	Hometown	Placement	Special Award	Notes
2025	Zulema Natarén Peña	Cuernavaca	Top 12	-	2nd Runner-up at Mexicana Universal Ciudad de México 2025; 1st Runner-up at Miss Globe México 2023; Miss Globe Ciudad de México 2023; Was born in Mexico City
2024	In 2024, due to changes in the dates of the national pageant, the election of the state queens was postponed for one year.				
2023	Kirssa Marie Coste González	Cuernavaca	-	-	-
2022	María Inés de los Santos Barreto	Zacualpan de Amilpas	-	-	Competed at Mexicana Universal Morelos 2018
2021	Dayana Marlene González Casarrubias	Yautepec	-	-	2nd Runner-up at Mexicana Universal Morelos 2018; Competed at Mexicana Universal Morelos 2017; Competed at Miss Morelos 2017; Princess at Reina de las Fiestas Patrias de Yautepec 2016
2020	In 2020, due to the contingency of COVID-19 there was a lag in the year of the state contest				
2019	Grisel Ramírez Roldán	Cuernavaca	-	-	-
2018	Samantha Ortega Bahena	Cuernavaca	Top 20	-	-
2017	Valeria Gabriela Vélez Gutiérrez	Cuernavaca	-	-	Competed at Miss Morelos 2017
Until 2016 the Title was Nuestra Belleza Morelos
2016	Constanza Oscos Gordillo	Cuernavaca	-	-	-
2015	Rebeca Garavito Bergantiños	Cuernavaca	-	-	-
2014	Claudia Mariela Sanders Ibarrola	Cuernavaca	Top 15	-	Miss México Costa Maya 2020; Top 16 at Miss Mexico 2019; Miss Morelos 2018; Competed at Nuestra Belleza Morelos 2013
2013	Daniela Álvarez Reyes	Cuernavaca	Nuestra Belleza Mundo México	Miss Talento	Top 11 en Miss World 2014
2012	Chiara Rose Leuzinger Zuccolotto	Cuernavaca	Top 10	-	Competed at Miss F1 México 2015; First Mexican-swiss born in St. Gallen, Switzerland
2011	Siri Mazari Lizárraga	Cuernavaca	Top 15	-	Miss Earth México-Fire 2009; Miss Earth Morelos 2009; María de Jesús Mazari's niece, Señorita Morelos 1980; Second Mexican-lebanese born in Morelos
2010	Melissa Carolina Torres Ruiz	Cuernavaca	Top 15	Miss Sports	-
2009	Anaiza Aguilar Macedo	Cuernavaca	-	-	-
2008	Ana Karen Mascott Carrasco	Cuernavaca	-	-	-
2007	Lorenza Bernot Krause	Cuernavaca	Top 10	Miss Top Model	Competed at Miss International 2008; Nuestra Belleza Internacional México 2008
2006	Karla Soto Guerrero	Cuernavaca	-	-	-
2005	Natalia Pérez Suárez	Cuernavaca	Top 20	-	-
2004	No candidate was sent				
2003	Yolanda Leal Tenorio	Cuernavaca	-	-	-
2002	Paulina Almada Rojas	Cuernavaca	1st Runner-up	Miss Photogenic; Best Figure	-
2001	Belly Lizene Corona Velazco	Cuernavaca	-	-	-
2000	Alinne Shedid Harnen	Cuernavaca	-	-	First Mexican-lebanese born in Morelos
1999	Graciela Soto Cámara	Cuernavaca	2nd Runner-up	-	Competed at Miss International 1999; Nuestra Belleza Internacional 1999
1998	Arlette Natera Martínez	Cuernavaca	-	-	-
1997	Blanca Delfina Soto Benavides	Cuernavaca	Nuestra Belleza Mundo México	Best Skin	Miss Verano Viña del Mar 1998; Miss Verano México 1998; Competed at Miss World 1997; 1st Runner-up at Nuestra Belleza México 1997; Was born in Nuevo León
1996	Ana Paula Castañares de los Cobos	Cuernavaca	-	-	-
1995	Ruth Sarquis Valenzuela	Cuernavaca	-	-	-
1994	Yolanda Diana Velázquez Monroy	Jojutla	Top 16	-	-

== See also ==
- Miss Morelos
