= Mexicana Universal Chihuahua =

Beauty contest in Mexico

Mexicana Universal Chiahuahua
- Formation: 1994 (as Nuestra Belleza Chihuahua); 2017 (as Mexicana Universal Chihuahua)
- Type: Beauty Pageant
- Headquarters: Ciudad Juárez
- Location: Mexico
- Local Coordinator: Héctor Rivera

Mexicana Universal Chihuahua (until 2016 called Nuestra Belleza Chihuahua) is a state-level contest in the state of Chihuahua, Mexico, which selects the state representative for the national contest Mexicana Universal (formerly called Nuestra Belleza México), thus aspiring to represent the country internationally on one of the platforms offered.

The state organization has achieved the following results since 1994:

- Winner: 3 (1995, 2019, 2022)
- 1st Runner-up: 1 (2018)
- 2nd Runner-up: 1 (1996)
- 3rd Runner-up: 1 (2001)
- 4th Runner-up: 1 (2013)
- Top 10/11/12: 9 (1998, 1999, 2000, 2002, 2004, 2006, 2007, 2009, 2012)
- Top 15/16: 2 (2014, 2016)
- Top 20/21: 1 (2003)
- Unplaced: 17 (1994, 1997, 1998, 1999, 2000, 2001, 2002, 2003, 2007, 2008, 2010, 2011, 2015, 2017, 2021, 2023, 2025)
- Absences: 1 (2005)

== National Queens ==
- Tania Estrada - Mexicana Grand Internacional 2024 (Designated)
- Tania Estrada - Mexicana Charm 2023 (Resigned)
- Andrea Meza - Mexicana Universal 2020
- Gabriela Prieto - Reina Hispanoamericana México 2013 (Designated)
- Georgina Holguín - Reina del Café México 2008 (Designated)
- Montserrat Montagut - Reina del Café México 2007 (Designated)
- Ofelia Chávez - Miss Atlántico México 2003 (Designated)
- Banelly Carrasco - Reina del Café México 1997 (Designated)
- Banelly Carrasco - Miss Verano México 1997 (Designated)
- Vanessa Guzmán - Señorita América México 1996 (Designated)
- Vanessa Guzmán - Nuestra Belleza México 1995

== International Queens ==
- Andrea Meza - Miss Universe 2020
- Vanessa Guzmán - Señorita América Internacional 1996

== Titleholders ==
The following are the names of the annual winners of Mexicana Universal Chihuahua, listed in ascending order, as well as their results during the national Mexicana Universal pageant. State queens who represented the country in a current or past franchise of the national organization are also highlighted in a specific color.

Current Franchises:

- Competed at Miss Grand International.
- Competed at Miss International.
- Competed at Miss Charm.
- Competed at Reina Hispanoamericana.
- Competed at Miss Orb International.
- Competed at Nuestra Latinoamericana Universal.

Former Franchises:

- Competed at Miss Universe.
- Competed at Miss World.
- Competed at Miss Continente Americano.
- Competed at Miss Costa Maya International.
- Competed at Miss Atlántico Internacional.
- Competed at Miss Verano Viña del Mar.
- Competed at Reina Internacional del Café.
- Competed at Reina Internacional de las Flores.
- Competed at Señorita Continente Americano.
- Competed at Nuestra Belleza Internacional.

Year	Titleholder	Hometown	Placement	Special Award	Notes
2025	Gisell Verónica Guevara Gándara	Ciudad Juárez	-	-	-
2024	In 2024, due to changes in the dates of the national pageant, the election of the state queens was postponed for this year.				
2023	Emma Suzana Campoya Magallanes	Ciudad Juárez	-	-	3rd Runner-up at Mexicana Universal Ciudad de México 2023; Competed at Miss Continente Americano 2017; Miss Continente Americano México 2017
2022	Tania Estrada Quezada	Guerrero	Mexicana Charm (Resigned)	-	Top 20 at Miss Grand International 2024; Mexicana Grand Internacional 2024; 1sr Runner-up at Nuestra Belleza Chihuahua 2016; Competed at Señorita UACH 2015
2021	Janeth Loya Trillo	Ciudad Juárez	-	-	Top 15 at Nuestra Belleza México 2017; Nuestra Belleza Chihuahua 2016
2020	In 2020, due to the contingency of COVID-19 there was a lag in the year of the state contest				
2019	Alma Andrea Meza Carmona	Chihuahua	Mexicana Universal	Fashion Fest Liverpool Model	Miss Universe 2020; Miss World Americas 2017; 1st Runner-up at Miss World 2017; Miss México 2017; Miss Chihuahua 2016; Competed at Señorita UACH 2015
2018	Marissa Angélica Navarro Meza	Ciudad Juárez	1st Runner-up	-	Reina del Club Rotario Juárez Chamizal 2014; Competed at Nuestra Belleza Chihuahua 2014
2017	Janneth Marleny Vargas Díaz	Chihuahua	-	-	-
Until 2016 the Title was Nuestra Belleza Chihuahua
2016	Janeth Loya Trillo	Ciudad Juárez	Top 15	-	Competed at Mexicana Universal 2022; Mexicana Universal Chihuahua 2021
2015	Celeste Espinoza Portillo	Parral	-	-	Top 16 at Miss México 2023; Miss Chihuahua 2021
2014	Yaritza Anahí Castillo Loera	Cuauhtémoc	Top 15	-	Miss Pacific World 2016; Miss Pcific World México 2016; Reina Cuauhtémoc 2011
2013	Ana Lucía Baduy Valles	Chihuahua	4th Runner-up	-	-
2012	Gabriela Prieto Díaz-Infante	Chihuahua	Top 10	Miss Talent	Cometed at Miss F1 México 2015; 3rd Runner-up at Reina Hispanoamericana 2013; Reina Hispanoamericana México 2013; 14TH Runner-up at Mexico's Next Top Model 2011; Rostro Adolescente Cd. Chihuahua 2010
2011	María Fernanda Carranza Ramírez	Ciudad Juárez	-	-	-
2010	Pamela Olivas Chaparro	Chihuahua	-	-	Miss Earth México-Air 2009; Miss Earth Chihuahua 2009
2009	Daniela Muñoz Grijalva	Chihuahua	Top 10	Miss Talent	-
2008	Nadia Hazel Renpenning Carrasco	Ciudad Juárez	-	-	Katharine Renpenning's niece, Señorita Chihuahua 1987
2007	Lucía Georgina Olguín Lozanoc	Chihuahua	Top 10	-	Top 10 at Reinado Internacional del Café 2008; Reina del Café México 2008
2006	Montserrat Montagut Enciso	Ciudad Juárez	Top 10	Best Figure	3rd Runner-up at Reinado Internacional del Café 2007; Reina del Café México 2007
2005	No candidate was sent				
2004	Elsa Cristina Salgado Quiñonez	Chihuahua	Top 10	Miss Sports	-
2003	Zuszeth Luna González	Ciudad Juárez	Top 20	-	-
2002	Mónica Lizeth Cervantes Cuellar	Ciudad Juárez	-	-	-
2001	Erika de la Rosa Castro	Ciudad Juárez	-	-	-
2000	Erika Valenzuela Ortega	Chihuahua	Top 10	Best Communicator	Top 20 at Nuestra Belleza Mundo México 2000
1999	Mónica Enríquez Rodríguez	Chihuahua	Top 10	-	-
1998	Larissa Carrera Aguilera	Ciudad Juárez	Top 11	-	Competed at Miss Friendship of the World 1999; Miss Frienship México 1999
1997	Mará Cristina Castro Loya	Chihuahua	-	-	-
1996	Banelly Carrasco Loya	Chihuahua	2nd Runner-up	-	Competed at Reinado Internacional del Café 1997; Reina del Café México 1997; Competed at Miss Verano Viña del Mar 1996; Miss Verano México 1996; 3rd Runner-up at Nuestra Belleza Mundo México 1996
1995	Vanessa Guzmán Niebla	Ciudad Juárez	Nuestra Belleza México	-	Top 6 at Miss Universe 1996; Señorita América Internacional 1996; Señorita América México 1996
1994	Luz María Delgado López	Chihuahua	-	-	-

== Designated Contestants ==
Starting in 2000, states were allowed to have more than one candidate, as some states were not sending candidates for various reasons. The following contestants from Chihuahua were invited to compete in the national pageant alongside the reigning queen, and in some cases, they achieved even better results.

Year	Titleholder	Hometown	Placement	Special Award	Notes
2007	Priscila Trejo Pérez	Chihuahua	-	-	1st Runner-up at Nuestra Belleza Chihuahua 2007; Competed at Miss Tourism Bikini of the World 2006; Miss Tourism Bikini México 2006
2003	Karla Becerra	Chihuahua	-	-	1st Runner-up at Nuestra Belleza Chihuahua 2003
2002	Gabriela Alejandra Oates Urias	Chihuahua	Top 12	-	1st Runner-up at Nuestra Belleza Chihuahua 2002
2001	Nancy Cecilia Esparza Tinajero	Chihuahua	3rd Runner-up	-	Competed at Mrs World 2019; Mrs World México 2019; 1st Runner-up at Mrs Tourism Queen International 2018; Mrs Tourism Queen México 2018; Top 21 at Nuestra Belleza Mundo México 2001; 1st Runner-up at Nuestra Belleza Chihuahua 2001; 4th Runner-up at Miss Intercontinental 2000; Miss Intercontinental México 2000; Competed at World Miss University 2000; World Miss University México 2000
2001	Ofelia Chávez Moreno	Chihuahua	-	-	Competed at Miss Atlántico Internacional 2003; Miss Atlántico México 2003; 2nd Runner-up at Nuestra Belleza Chihuahua 2001
2000	Mirta Janet Bojórquez Loya	Chihuahua	-	-	1st Runner-up at Nuestra Belleza Chihuahua 2000

== See also ==
- Miss Chihuahua
