= Miss Morelos =

State-level contest in Morelos, Mexico

- Formation: 2016
- Type: Beauty Pageant
- Headquarters: Cuernavaca
- Location: Mexico
- Local Coordinator: Oscar Gatica

Miss Morelos is a state-level contest in the state of Morelos, Mexico, which selects the state representative for the national contest Miss México, thus aspiring to represent the country internationally on one of the platforms offered.

The state organization has achieved the following results since 2016:

- Winner: 2 (2023, 2025)
- Top 10/11: 1 (2021)
- Top 16: 1 (2018)
- Unplaced: 4 (2016, 2017, 2019)

== National Queens ==
- Cassandra García - Miss México 2025
- Grecia Miranda - Miss México Top Model of the World 2024
- Mariela Sanders - Miss México Costa Maya 2020 (Designated)
- Priscila Valverde - Miss México Top Model of the World 2020 (Designated)
- Ximena Cardozo - Miss México Costa Maya 2017 (Designated)

== Titleholders ==
The following are the names of the annual winners of Miss Morelos, listed in ascending order, as well as their results during the national Miss México pageant. State queens who represented the country in a current or past franchise of the national organization are also highlighted in a specific color.

Current Franchises:

- Competed at Miss World.
- Competed at Miss Supranational.
- Competed at Miss Cosmo.
- Competed at Miss Elite.
- Competed at Top Model of the World.
- Competed at Reina Internacional del Café.
- Competed at Reina Mundial del Banano.
- Competed at Miss Continentes Unidos.
- Competed at Miss Global City.

Former Franchises:

- Competed at Miss Grand International.
- Competed at Miss Costa Maya International.

Year	Titleholder	Hometown	Placement	Special Award	Notes
2026	Ana Karel Nájera Espinoza	Axochiapan	TBD		
2025	Cassandra García Olea	Emiliano Zapata	Miss México	Beauty with a Purpose; Miss Beach Beauty	Will compete at Miss World 2026; Competed at Señorita Adolescente México 2021; Señorita Adolescente Morelos 2021
2024	Due to changes in the dates of the national pageant, the election of the state queens was postponed for this year.				
2023	Grecia Paulina Miranda Salgado	Yautepec	Miss México; Top Model of the World	-	Top 6 at Top Model of the World 2024; Top 10 at Miss México 2023; Miss Morelos 2021; Competed at Miss Mesoamérica México 2017; Miss Mesoamérica Morelos 2017; Competed at Miss Earth México 2016; Miss Earth Morelos 2016
2022	Due to changes in the dates of the national pageant, the election of the state queens was postponed for this year.				
2021	Mirlet Hernández (Resigned)	Cuernavaca	Did not Compete	-	-
2021	Grecia Paulina Miranda Salgado (Assumed)	Yautepec	Top 10	-	Top 6 at Top Model of the World 2024; Miss México Top Model of the World 2024; Miss Morelos 2023; 1st Runner-up at Miss Morelos 2021; Competed at Miss Mesoamérica México 2017; Miss Mesoamérica Morelos 2017; Competed at Miss Earth México 2016; Miss Earth Morelos 2016
2020	Due to the contingency of COVID-19 there was a lag in the year of the state contest				
2019	Alejandra Gabriela Huerta Velázquez (Dethroned)	Cuernavaca	Did not Compete	-	-
2019	María Fernanda Hutterer Fonseca (Assumed)	Cuernavaca	-	-	1st Runner-up at Miss Morelos 2019
2018	Claudia Mariela Sanders Ibarrola	Cuernavaca	Top 16	-	Miss México Costa Maya 2020; Top 15 at Nuestra Belleza México 2014; Nuestra Belleza Morelos 2014; Competed at Nuestra Belleza Morelos 2013
2017	Priscila Natalie Moreno Valverde	Cuautla	-	-	Top 10 at Miss Universe México 2024; Miss Universe Guerrero 2024; 1st Runner-up at Top Model of the World 2020; Miss México Top Model of the World 2020; 1st Runner-up at Miss México Grand 2020; Was born in Guerrero
2016	Ximena Cardoso Gutiérrez	Cuernavaca	-	-	Competed at Miss Costa Maya International 2017; Miss México Costa Maya 2017

== See also ==
- Mexicana Universal Morelos
