= Mexicana Universal Tamaulipas =

Pageant in Tamaulipas, Mexico

- Formation: 1994 (as Nuestra Belleza Tamulipas); 2017 (as Mexicana Universal Tamaulipas)
- Type: Beauty Pageant
- Headquarters: Reynosa
- Location: Mexico
- Local Coordinator: Jesús Muñoz

Mexicana Universal Tamaulipas (until 2016 called Nuestra Belleza Tamaulipas) is a state-level contest in the state of Tamaulipas, Mexico, which selects the state representative for the national contest Mexicana Universal (formerly called Nuestra Belleza México), thus aspiring to represent the country internationally on one of the platforms offered.

The state organization has achieved the following results since 1994:

- Winner: 3 (1996, 2004, 2015)
- 1st Runner-up: 1 (2016)
- 3rd Runner-up: 3 (1999, 2005, 2006)
- 4th Runner-up: 1 (2014)
- Top 10/11/12: 3 (2001, 2002, 2007)
- Top 15/16: 5 (1997, 2010, 2013, 2019, 2021)
- Top 20/21: 3 (2000, 2003, 2005)
- Unplaced: 12 (1994, 1995, 1998, 2008, 2009, 2011, 2012, 2017, 2018, 2022, 2023, 2025)

== National Queens ==
- Citlaly Higuera - Mexicana Internacional 2017 (Designated)
- Kristal Silva - Nuestra Belleza México 2016
- Sandra Ahumada - Reina Hispanoamericana México 2015 (Designated)
- Laura Elizondo - Nuestra Belleza México 2004
- Mónica Aragón - Reina del Café México 2002 (Designated)
- Rebeca Tamez - Señorita Continente Americano México 1997 (Designated)
- Rebeca Tamez - Nuestra Belleza México 1996

== International Queens ==
- Rebeca Tamez - Señorita Continente Americano 1997

== Titleholders ==
The following are the names of the annual winners of Mexicana Universal Tabasco, listed in ascending order, as well as their results during the national Mexicana Universal pageant. State queens who represented the country in a current or past franchise of the national organization are also highlighted in a specific color.

Current Franchises:

- Competed at Miss Grand International.
- Competed at Miss International.
- Competed at Miss Charm.
- Competed at Reina Hispanoamericana.
- Competed at Miss Orb International.
- Competed at Nuestra Latinoamericana Universal.

Former Franchises:

- Competed at Miss Universe.
- Competed at Miss World.
- Competed at Miss Continente Americano.
- Competed at Miss Costa Maya International.
- Competed at Miss Atlántico Internacional.
- Competed at Miss Verano Viña del Mar.
- Competed at Reina Internacional del Café.
- Competed at Reina Internacional de las Flores.
- Competed at Señorita Continente Americano.
- Competed at Nuestra Belleza Internacional.

Year	Titleholder	Hometown	Placement	Special Award	Notes
2025	Daniela Esperanza Rueda Muñoz	Nuevo Laredo	-	-	Dama at Reina de la Feria Expomex Nuevo Laredo 2023
2024	In 2024, due to changes in the dates of the national pageant, the election of the state queens was postponed for one year.				
2023	Rita Zulema Rodríguez Flores	Tampico	-	-	Competed at Mexicana Universal 2018; Mexicana Universal Tamulipas 2017; Competed at Miss Teen Mundial México 2016; Miss Teen Mundial Tamaulipas 2016
2022	Brenda Scarlett López Mercado	Ciudad Victoria	-	-	Reina del Festival del Mar 2023; First married woman and mother from Tamaulipas
2021	Melissa Jaytzel Mireles Escobedo	Ciudad Victoria	Top 15	-	Miss Teen Ciudad Victoria 2017
2020	In 2020, due to the contingency of COVID-19 there was a lag in the year of the state contest				
2019	Claudia Patricia Morato García	Matamoros	Top 16	-	Top 10 at Miss Tourism International 2018; Miss Tourism International México 2018; Top 16 at Miss Mexico 2016; Miss Tamaulipas 2016; 1st Runner-up at Nuestra Belleza Tamaulipas 2016; 1st Runner-up at Nuestra Belleza Tamaulipas 2012
2018	Diana Lucía Rivera de León	Tampico	-	-	Top 16 at Miss Earth México 2015; Miss Earth Tamaulipas 2015
2017	Rita Zulema Rodríguez Flores	Tampico	-	-	Competed at Mexicana Universal 2025; Mexicana Universal Tamaulipas 2023; Competed at Miss Teen Mundial México 2016; Miss Teen Mundial Tamaulipas 2016
Until 2016 the Title was Nuestra Belleza Tamaulipas
2016	Treisy Citlaly Higuera López	Ciudad Madero	1st Runner-up	Steps to Fame	Competed at Miss International 2017; Mexicana Internacional 2017; 1st Runner-up at Nuestra Belleza Tamaulipas 2014; 1st Runner-up at Nuestra Belleza Ciudad Victoria 2014; 1st Runner-up at Flor del Campo México 2013; Flor del Campo Tamaulipas 2013; Flor del Campo Casas 2013
2015	Yuselmi Cristal Silva Dávila	Ciudad Victoria	Nuestra Belleza México	Miss Top Model	Top 9 at Miss Universe 2016; Top 8 at Miss Earth 2013; Miss Earth México 2013; Miss Earth Tamaulipas 2013; 1st Runner-up at Nuestra Belleza Tamaulipas 2013; Nuestra Belleza Ciudad Victoria 2013
2014	Sandra Ahumada Treviño	Tampico	4th Runner-up	-	Top 7 at Reina Hispanoamericana 2015; Reina Hispanoamericana México 2015; Competed at Miss F1 México 2015; Top 5 at Nuestra Belleza Mundo México 2014; Nuestra Belleza Sur de Tamaulipas 2014
2013	Bárbara Giovanni Falcón Prieto	Nuevo Laredo	Top 15	Miss Congeniality	1st Runner-up at Miss Texas USA 2017; 2nd Runner-up at Miss Texas USA 2016; Nuestra Belleza Nuevo Laredo 2013; 6th Runner-up at Nuestra Belleza Latina 2013; 3rd Runner-up at Miss Texas USA 2013; 2nd Runner-up at Miss Texas USA 2012; Top 15 at Miss Texas USA 2009; Top 15 at Miss Texas Teen USA 2008; Competed at Miss Texas Teen USA 2007; Competed at Miss Texas Teen USA 2006; Fourth Mexican-american born in Tamaulipas
2012	Lluvia Andrea Andrade Vargas	Reynosa	-	-	Top 20 at Miss Texas USA 2017; 1st Runner-up at Nuestra Belleza Raynosa 2012; Third Mexican-american born in Tamaulipas
2011	Karen Alejandra Lizcano Flores	Tampico	-	-	1st Runner-up at Miss Belleza Mundial 2021; Miss Belleza Mundial México 2021; 1st Runner-up at Face of Beauty México 2015; Face of Beauty Tamaulipas 2015; Competed at Miss Petite Universe México 2015; Miss Petite Universe Tamaulipas 2015
2010	Ana Cecilia Ortiz Rodríguez (Resigned)	Reynosa	Did not Compete	-	Nuestra Belleza Reynosa 2010
2010	Claudia Maribel González Elizondo (Assumed)	Ciudad Victoria	Top 15	Academic Award	1st Runner-up at Nuestra Belleza Tamaulipas 2010
2009	Melissa Solano Caballero (Resigned)	Ciudad Victoria	Did not Compete	-	Nuestra Belleza Ciudad Victoria 2009
2009	Ana Karen González Abdala (Assumed)	Nuevo Laredo	-	-	1st Runner-up at Nuestra Belleza Tamaulipas 2009; Nuestra Belleza Nuevo Laredo 2009
2008	Alejandra Silva Hernández	Ciudad Madero	-	-	Nuestra Belleza Sur de Tamaulipas 2008
2007	Valerie Padilla Pontvianne	Tampico	Top 10	-	Nuestra Belleza Sur de Tamaulipas 2007; Doris Pontvianne's daughter, Señorita Tamaulipas 1981 & Señorita Mundo México 1981; Angélica Pontvianne's niece, Señorita Tamaulipas 1985
2006	Adriana Celis Renero	Ciudad Victoria	3rd Runner-up	Miss Top Model; Best Hair Optims	Alejandra Celis' sister, Nuestra Belleza Tamaulipas 2003
2005	Lorena Ramos Paredes	Matamoros	Top 20	Miss Congeniality	-
2004	Laura Elizondo Erhard	Tampico	Nuestra Belleza México	Fuller Beauty Queen	3rd Runner-up at Miss Universe 2005
2003	Alejandra Celis Renero	Ciudad Victoria	Top 20	-	Adriana Celis' sister, Nuestra Belleza Tamaulipas 2006
2002	Miriam Ferro Romero	Tampico	Top 12	-	-
2001	Mónica Aragón Herrera	Tampico	Top 10	Best Hair; Miss Internet	Competed at Reinado Internacional del Café 2002; Reina del Café México 2002; Top 21 at Nuestra Belleza Mundo México 2001; Rosa María Aragón's sister, Nuestra Belleza Tamaulipas 1998
2000	Gabriela Josefina Soberón García	Reynosa	-	-	-
1999	Rosa María Aragón Herrera	Tampico	3rd Runner-up	Best Hair; Skin Hinds	Competed at Reina Panamericana de la Belleza 1999; Reina Panamericana México 1999; Mónica Aragón's sister, Nuestra Belleza Tamaulipas 2001
1998	Nayma Karina Balquiarena Pérez	Ciudad Victoria	-	-	-
1997	Kelly Ann Nelson González	Reynosa	Top 16	-	Second Mexican-american born in Tamaulipas
1996	Rebeca Lyn Tamez Jones	Ciudad Victoria	Nuestra Belleza México	Best Skins; Miss Photogenic	Competed at Miss Universe 1997; Señorita Continente Americano 1997; Señorita Continente Americano México 1997; First Mexican-american born in Tamaulipas
1995	Nelly Yo-lan Chao Quiñones	Nuevo Laredo	-	-	-
1994	Denisse Carrera Delgado	Ciudad Victoria	-	-	-

== Designated Contestants ==
Starting in 2000, states were allowed to have more than one candidate, as some states were not sending candidates for various reasons. The following contestants from Tamaulipas were invited to compete in the national pageant alongside the reigning queen, and in some cases, they achieved even better results.

Year	Titleholder	Hometown	Placement	Special Award	Notes
2005	Julia María Muñoz González	Tampico	3rd Runner-up	-	1st Runner-up at Nuestra Belleza Tamaulipas 2005
2003	Yadira Patiño Cardoza	Matamoros	Top 20	-	Top 15 at Miss Intercontinental 2008; Miss Intercontinental México 2008; Top 12 at Miss Latin America 2008; Miss América Latina México 2008; Competed at Miss Atlántico Internacional 2008; Miss Atlántico México 2008; Competed at Miss Tourism Queen International 2007; Miss Tourism Queen México 2007; 1st Runner-up at Nuestra Belleza Tamaulipas 2003
2002	Karla Argentina de Luna Flores	Reynosa	Top 12	-	1st Runner-up at Nuestra Belleza Tamaulipas 2002
2001	María Alicia Rojas Lozano	Tampico	-	-	1st Runner-up at Nuestra Belleza Tamaulipas 2001
2000	Minerva Ivette Quintanilla Barrios	Reynosa	Top 20	-	Top 20 at Nuestra Belleza Mundo México 2000; 1st Runner-up at Nuestra Belleza Tamaulipas 2000

== See also ==
- Miss Tamaulipas
