= Nuestra Belleza Tamaulipas 2012 =

- Date: July 12, 2012
- Presenters: Andrea Torre, Mauricio Mejía, Rossy Treviño, Tony Rey
- Entertainment: Polo Rojas
- Venue: Teatro de la Reforma, Matamoros, Tamaulipas
- Broadcaster: Televisa
- Entrants: 7
- Placements: 3
- Winner: Andrea Andrade; Reynosa

Nuestra Belleza Tamaulipas 2012 was held at the Teatro de la Reforma of Matamoros, Tamaulipas on July 12, 2012. At the conclusion of the final night of competition Andrea Andrade from Reynosa was crowned the winner. Andrade was crowned by outgoing Nuestra Belleza Tamaulipas titleholder Karen Lizcano. Seven contestants competed for the title.

== Results ==
=== Placements ===
Final results	Contestant
Nuestra Belleza Tamaulipas 2012	Andrea Andrade
Suplente / 1st Runner-up	Claudia Morato

== Background Music ==
- Polo Rojas

== Contestants ==
Hometown	Contestant
Cd. Victoria	Nora Berumen Roldán
Madero	Estefanía Azuara Meraz
Matamoros	Claudia Patricia Morato García
Nuevo Laredo	Karla Gabriela García Valadez
Reynosa	Iriam Arely Hernández López
Reynosa	Ileana Vázquez González
Reynosa	Lluvia Andrea Andrade Vargas
