= Diana Romero =

Mexican model, beauty queen

- Born: Diana Romero Ortega; Culiacán, Sinaloa, Mexico
- Education: University of Guadalajara
- Height: 1.76 m (5 ft 9 1/2 in)
- Beauty pageant titleholder
- Hair color: Light brown
- Eye color: Blue
- Major competitions: Miss México 2018; (2nd Runner-up); (Miss Supranational Mexico); Miss Supranational 2018; (4th Runner-up); (Best National Costume)

Diana Romero Ortega is a Mexican model and beauty queen who represented Mexico at the Miss Supranational 2018 pageant where she placed as the fourth Runner-up. Romero became the trird Mexican to be placed as a finalist in Miss Supranational history.

== Pegeantry ==
=== Miss México 2018 ===
Romero competed in the state pageant of Miss Sinaloa 2017, winning the title to represent her state Sinaloa in Miss México 2018. At the end of the event, she finished second runner-up and was crowned Miss Supranational Mexico 2018 at the finals held at the Imperial Hall of Villa Toscana, Hermosillo, Sonora on May 5, 2018. The finale coronation night, Vanessa Ponce from Mexico City won the title of Miss Mexico.

=== Miss Supranational 2018 ===
As Miss Supranational Mexico 2018, Romero represented Mexico at the 10th edition of Miss Supranational 2018 pageant in Hala MOSiR Arena, Krynica-Zdrój, Poland. The finale coronation night of the pageant was held on December 7, 2018, Romero competed with the other 72 countries, where she ended-up crowned as the fourth runner-up, repeating the same achievement by Karina Martín in Miss Supranational 2015. Beside of that, she also managed to win the Best National Costume award.

Awards and achievements
Preceded by (Puerto Rico) Larissa Santiago	Miss Supranational 4th Runner-up; 2018	Succeeded by (Venezuela) Gabriela de la Cruz
Preceded by (Panama) Karol Dayana Batista	Best National Costume; 2018	Succeeded by (Mexico) Dariana Urista
Preceded by (Guerrero) Samantha Leyva	Miss Supranational Mexico; 2018	Succeeded by (Sinaloa) Dariana Urista
