= Miss Sinaloa =

Beauty pageant in Sinaloa, Mexico

- Formation: 2016
- Type: Beauty pageant
- Headquarters: Culiacán
- Location: Mexico
- Local Coordinator: Leo Rubio

Miss Sinaloa is a state-level contest in the state of Sinaloa, Mexico, which selects the state representative for the national contest Miss México, thus aspiring to represent the country internationally on one of the platforms offered.

The state organization has achieved the following results since 2016:

- Winner: 2 (2023, 2025)
- 2nd Runner-up: 2 (2017, 2021)
- Top 10/11: 1 (2018)
- Top 16: 1 (2016)
- Unplaced: 3 (2019)

== National Queens ==
- Angela Yuriar - Miss México Cosmo 2025
- Karla Rivas - Reina del Café México 2024 (Designated)
- Maryely Leal - Miss México 2023
- Angela Yuriar - Miss México Grannd 2020 (Designated)
- Diana Romero - Miss México Global City 2019 (Designated)
- Diana Romero - Miss México Supranational 2018 (Designated)

== Titleholders ==
The following are the names of the annual winners of Miss Sinaloa, listed in ascending order, as well as their results during the national Miss México pageant. State queens who represented the country in a current or past franchise of the national organization are also highlighted in a specific color.

Current Franchises:

- Competed at Miss World.
- Competed at Miss Supranational.
- Competed at Miss Cosmo.
- Competed at Miss Elite.
- Competed at Top Model of the World.
- Competed at Reina Internacional del Café.
- Competed at Reina Mundial del Banano.
- Competed at Miss Continentes Unidos.
- Competed at Miss Global City.

Former Franchises:

- Competed at Miss Grand International.
- Competed at Miss Costa Maya International.

Year	Titleholder	Hometown	Placement	Special Award	Notes
2026	TBA				
2025	Angela Michelle León Yuriar	Culiacán	Miss México Cosmo	-	Top 21 at Miss Cosmo 2025; Miss Earth Sinaloa 2024; Top 20 at Miss Grand International 2020; Miss México Grand 2020; Top 10 at Miss México 2019; Miss Sinaloa 2018
2024	In 2024, due to changes in the dates of the national pageant, the election of the state queens was postponed for one year.				
2023	Maryely Leal Cervantes	Guasave	Miss México	-	Competed at Miss World 2025; Top 6 at Miss México Top Model of the World 2024; 2nd Runner-up at Mexicana Universal 2018; Mexicana Universal Sinaloa 2017
2022	In 2022, due to changes in the dates of the national pageant, the election of the state queens was postponed for one year.				
2021	Karla Astrid Maraboto Rivas	Mazatlán	2nd Runner-up	Miss Talent	3rd Princess at Reinado Internacional del Café 2024; Reina del Café México 2024; Top 10 at Miss México Supranational 2023; Top 4 at Miss México Elite 2023; Reina del Carnaval Internacional de Mazatlán 2019
2020	In 2020, due to the contingency of COVID-19 there was a lag in the year of the state contest				
2019	Elizabeth Vidaña Ortiz	Culiacán	-	-	2nd Runner-up at Nuestra Belleza Sinaloa 2016
2018	Angela Michelle León Yuriar	Culiacán	Top 10	Miss Top Model; Miss Beach Beauty; Head to Head	Top 21 at Miss Cosmo 2025; Miss México Cosmo 2025; Miss Earth Sinaloa 2024; Top 20 at Miss Grand International 2020; Miss México Grand 2020; Miss México Noroeste; Miss Sinaloa 2025
2017	Diana Romero Ortega	Culiacán	2nd Runner-up	Best Smile; Head to Head	1st Runner-up at Miss Global City 2019; Miss México Global City 2019; 4th Runner-up at Miss Supranational 2018; Miss México Supranational 2018
2016	Melissa Carolina Lizárraga Castro	Culiacan	Top 16	-	Top 15 at Miss México Grand 2017; Miss Pacífico y Caribe 2014; 1st Runner-up at Nuestra Belleza Sinaloa 2014; Competed at Miss Intercontinental 2013; Miss México Intercontinental 2013; 2nd Runner-up at Nuestra Belleza Sinaloa 2012; Miss Teenager México 2012

== See also ==
- Mexicana Universal Sinaloa
