= Nuestra Belleza Estado de México 2012 =

- Date: July 14, 2012
- Venue: Mambocafé, Metepec, Estado de México
- Broadcaster: Televisa
- Entrants: 10
- Placements: 5
- Winner: Laura Villalobos; Metepec

Nuestra Belleza Estado de México 2012, was held at Mambocafé of Metepec, Estado de México on July 14, 2012. At the conclusion of the final night of competition Laura Villalobos from Metepec was crowned the winner. Villalobos was crowned by Nuestra Belleza Estado de México 2011 Nohemí Hermosillo. Ten contestants competed for the title.

== Results ==
=== Placements ===
Final results	Contestant
Nuestra Belleza Estado de México 2012	Laura Villalobos
Suplente / 1st Runner-up	Dominicq Langle
2nd Runner-up	María Elena Jaimes
3rd Runner-up	Laura Campos
4th Runner-up	Andrea Garduño
