= Mexicana Universal Estado de México =

- Formation: 1994 (as Nuestra Belleza Estado de México); 2017 (as Mexicana Universal Estado de México)
- Type: Beauty Pageant
- Headquarters: Mexico City
- Location: Mexico
- Local Coordinator: Viridiana Mercado

Mexicana Universal Estado de México or MXU EDOMEX (until 2016 called Nuestra Belleza Estado de México) is a state-level contest in the state of Estado de México, Mexico, which selects the state representative for the national contest Mexicana Universal (formerly called Nuestra Belleza México), thus aspiring to represent the country internationally on one of the platforms offered.

The state organization has achieved the following results since 1994:

- Winner: 1 (1994)
- 1st Runner-up: 1 (2011)
- 2nd Runner-up: 1 (2022)
- 3rd Runner-up: 1 (1997)
- Top 10/11/12: 2 (2013, 2025)
- Top 15/16: 3 (1999, 2009, 2021)
- Top 20: 1 (2003)
- Unplaced: 14 (1995, 1996, 1998, 2000, 2001, 2005, 2007, 2012, 2014, 2015, 2016, 2017, 2018, 2023)
- Absences: 6 (2002, 2004, 2006, 2008, 2010, 2019)

== National Queens ==
- Elizabeth Jiménez - Reina de las Flores México 1998 (Designated)
- Luz María Zetina - Nuestra Belleza México 1994

== Titleholders ==
The following are the names of the annual winners of Mexicana Universal Estado de México, listed in ascending order, as well as their results during the national Mexicana Universal pageant. State queens who represented the country in a current or past franchise of the national organization are also highlighted in a specific color.

Current Franchises:

- Competed at Miss Grand International.
- Competed at Miss International.
- Competed at Miss Charm.
- Competed at Reina Hispanoamericana.
- Competed at Miss Orb International.
- Competed at Nuestra Latinoamericana Universal.

Former Franchises:

- Competed at Miss Universe.
- Competed at Miss World.
- Competed at Miss Continente Americano.
- Competed at Miss Costa Maya International.
- Competed at Miss Atlántico Internacional.
- Competed at Miss Verano Viña del Mar.
- Competed at Reina Internacional del Café.
- Competed at Reina Internacional de las Flores.
- Competed at Señorita Continente Americano.
- Competed at Nuestra Belleza Internacional.

Year	Titleholder	Hometown	Placement	Special Award	Notes
2025	Blanca Janetzy Cuevas Rodríguez	Huixquilucan	Top 12	-	1st Runner-up at Miss México Elite 2023; Top 16 at Miss México 2023; Miss Guanajuato 2021; Was born in Guanajuato
2024	In 2024, due to changes in the dates of the national pageant, the election of the state queens was postponed for one year.				
2023	Mariana Esthefania Lara García	Tenancingo	-	-	-
2022	Mariana Magdalena López Guerrero	Naucalpan	2nd Runner-up	-	Top 11 at Miss México 2025; Miss Zacatecas 2025
2021	Desiré Velázquez Ayón	Toluca	Top 15	-	Reina de los Juegos Florales del Carnaval Internacional de Mazatlán 2025
2020	In 2020, due to the contingency of COVID-19 there was a lag in the year of the state contest				
2019	No candidate was sent				
2018	Arantza Ceceña Romero	Otzolotepec	-	-	-
2017	Martha Isabel Chávez López	Atizapán	-	-	4th Runner-up at Nuestra Belleza Estado de México 2015
Until 2016 the Title was Nuestra Belleza Estado de México
2016	Eliany Rubio Pérez	Atizapán	-	-	Miss Tlalnepantla 2014
2015	Lucía Moreno Noriega	Toluca	-	-	-
2014	Lizbeth Bravo Gutiérrez	Cuautitlán Izcalli	-	-	Competed at Reina Mundial del Oro 2015; Reina del Oro México 2015; Competed at Miss F1 México 2015
2013	Jeaninne Laurette Saad Meraz	Metepec	Top 10	-	2nd Runner-up at Miss Líbano México 2016; Competed at Miss F1 México 2015; First Mexican-lebanese born in Estado de México
2012	Laura Villalobos Cano	Metepec	-	-	4th Runner-up at Miss F1 México 2015
2011	Nohemí Hermosillo Villalobos	Toluca	1st Runner-up	-	1st Runner-up at Mexico's Next Top Model 2009
2010	No candidate was sent				
2009	Mercedes Gutiérrez Mares	Toluca	Top 15	-	-
2008	No candidate was sent				
2007	Verónica Espinosa de la Piedra	Toluca	-	-	-
2006	No candidate was sent				
2005	Tannenke Mariscal Gutiérrez	Toluca	-	-	-
2004	No candidate was sent				
2003	Priscilla Bustillos Larrañaga	Toluca	Top 20	-	-
2002	No candidate was sent				
2001	Eva Geynes Gutiérrez	Toluca	-	-	-
2000	Airam García Cárdenas	Toluca	-	-	-
1999	Itzanami Bermúdez Sánchez	Toluca	Top 15	-	-
1998	Karen Maya Helm	Toluca	-	-	-
1997	Elizabeth Jiménez Dueñas	Toluca	3rd Runner-up	-	Competed at Señorita Continente Americano 1998; Señorita Continente Americano México 1998; Competed at Reinado Internacional de las Flores 1998; Reina de las Flores México 1998; 3rd Runner-up at Nuestra Belleza Mundo México 1997
1996	Maricela del Carmen Fernández Tovar	Toluca	-	-	-
1995	María Guadalupe Flores	Toluca	-	-	-
1994	Luz María Zetina Lugo	Toluca	Nuestra Belleza México	-	Competed at Miss Universe 1995; Was born in the Mexico City

== Designated Contestants ==
Starting in 2000, states were allowed to have more than one candidate, as some states were not sending candidates for various reasons. The following contestants from Estado de México were invited to compete in the national pageant alongside the reigning queen, and in some cases, they achieved even better results.

Year	Titleholder	Hometown	Placement	Special Award	Notes
2014	Vanessa Acero Jaimes	Huixquilucan	-	-	Competed at Miss F1 México 2015; 1st Runner-up at Nuestra Belleza Estado de México 2014
2000	Susana Arlett Diazayas Jimeno	Toluca	-	-	1st Runner-up at Nuestra Belleza Estado de México 2000

== See also ==
- Miss Estado de México
