= Miss Ciudad de México =

Beauty pageant

- Formation: 2016
- Type: Beauty Pageant
- Headquarters: Mexico City
- Location: Mexico
- Local Coordinator: Clara Félix

Miss Ciudad de México is a state-level contest in the state of Mexico City, Mexico, which selects the state representative for the national contest Miss México, thus aspiring to represent the country internationally on one of the platforms offered.

The state organization has achieved the following results since 2016:

- Winner: 2 (2016, 2017)
- 3rd Runner-up: 1 (2025)
- 4thRunner-up: 1 (2023)
- Top 10/11: 1 (2021)
- Top 16: 2 (2018, 2019)

== National Queens ==
- Vanessa Ponce - Miss México 2018
- Ana Girault - Miss México 2016

== International Queens ==
- Vanessa Ponce - Miss World 2018

== Titleholders ==
The following are the names of the annual winners of Miss Ciudad de México, listed in ascending order, as well as their results during the national Miss México pageant. State queens who represented the country in a current or past franchise of the national organization are also highlighted in a specific color.

Current Franchises:

- Competed at Miss World.
- Competed at Miss Supranational.
- Competed at Miss Cosmo.
- Competed at Miss Elite.
- Competed at Top Model of the World.
- Competed at Reina Internacional del Café.
- Competed at Reina Mundial del Banano.
- Competed at Miss Continentes Unidos.
- Competed at Miss Global City.

Former Franchises:

- Competed at Miss Grand International.
- Competed at Miss Costa Maya International.

Year	Titleholder	Hometown	Placement	Special Award	Notes
2026	Evelin Isabel Castillo Carbajal	Mexico City	TBD		Was born in Guerrero
2025	Alexia Nirjhara Sanfilippo Rivera	Mexico City	3rd Runner-up	-	-
2024	Due to changes in the dates of the national pageant, the election of the state queens was postponed for this year.				
2023	Victoria Rodríguez Fernández (Resigned)	Mexico City	Did not Compete	-	-
2023	Zahara Mercado Gómez (Assumed)	Mexico City	4th Runner-up	-	Top 16 at Miss México Top Model of the World 2024; 1st Runner-up at Miss Ciudad de México 2023; Competed at Miss Ciudad de México 2021
2022	Due to changes in the dates of the national pageant, the election of the state queens was postponed for this year.				
2021	Miranda Huerta Ojeda	Mexico City	Top 10	-	-
2020	Due to the contingency of COVID-19 there was a lag in the year of the state contest				
2019	Arianny Tenorio (Resigned)	Mexico City	Did not Compete	-	First Mexican-venezuelan born in Anzoátegui, Venezuela
2019	Jéssica Lizet Rodríguez Farjat (Assumed)	Mexico City	Top 16	Dances of Mexico	Top 16 at Miss Universe México 2024; Miss Universe Estado de México 2024; Miss Grand México 2022
2018	Jeanette Nahil Karam Tova	Mexico City	Top 16	-	First Mexican-lebanese born in the Mexico City; Stephanie Karam's sister, Nuestra Belleza Ciudad de México 2015
2017	Silvia Vanessa Ponce de León Sánchez	Mexico City	Miss México	Beauty With a Purpose	Miss World 2018; Mexico's Next Top Model 2014
2016	Ana Girault Contreras	Mexico City	Miss México	Golf Challenge	Competed at Miss World 2016

== See also ==
- Mexicana Universal Ciudad de México
