= Nuestra Belleza Chihuahua 2010 =

- Date: August 4, 2010
- Presenters: Jessica Robles, Archie LanFranco
- Venue: Auditorio de las 3 Culturas, Cuauhtémoc, Chihuahua
- Broadcaster: Televisa
- Entrants: 8
- Placements: 3
- Winner: Pamela Olivas

Nuestra Belleza Chihuahua 2010, was held at the Auditorio de las 3 Culturas, Cuauhtémoc, Chihuahua on August 4, 2010. At the conclusion of the final night of competition, Pamela Olivas of the capital city Chihuahua was crowned the winner. Olivas was crowned by outgoing Nuestra Belleza Chihuahua titleholder, Daniela Muñoz. Eight contestants competed for the state title.

== Results ==
=== Placements ===
Final results	Contestant
Nuestra Belleza Chihuahua 2010	Pamela Olivas
Suplente / 1st Runner-up	Idalí Zubiate
2nd Runner-up	Samantha Gallegos

=== Special awards ===
Award	Contestant
Miss Photogenic	Aidé Araiza
Miss Congeniality	Andrea Alvídrez
Miss Discipline	Pamela Olivas
Miss Attitude	Pamela Olivas

== Background Music ==
- Rodrigo Fernández

== Contestants ==
Hometown	Contestant	Age
Cd. Juárez	Anaís Estabaly Tena Sánchez	23
Cd. Juárez	Haydee Araiza Astorga	20
Cd. Juárez	Idaly Zubiate Luna	22
Chihuahua	Pamela Olivas Chaparro	23
Chihuahua	Renee Paulina Ortega González	18
Chihuahua	Samantha Irene Gallegos Samaniego	22
Hidalgo del Parral	Andrea Alvidrez Mata	20
Hidalgo del Parral	Blanca Liliana Sánchez Torres	19

== Contestants Notes ==
- Pamela Olivas was elected Miss Earth Chihuahua 2009 and she represented her State in the national competition Miss Earth Mexico 2009 in Yucatán, where she won the title de Miss Air (1st Runner-up).
