= María Malo =

Mexican model and beauty pageant titleholder

- Born: María Malo Juvera Raimond Kedilhac; 2 December 1996 (age 29); Mexico City, Mexico
- Occupation: Model
- Height: 182 cm (5 ft 11 1/2 in)
- Title: Miss Grand Mexico 2019

María Malo Juvera Raimond Kedilhac is a Mexican model and beauty pageant titleholder who represented her country in the Miss Grand International 2019 pageant in Caracas, Venezuela, where she placed as first runner-up.

== Early life and education ==
Malo was born on December 2, 1996 in Mexico City, to a Mexican father and a mother of French descent. She subsequently raised in Huixquilucan, State of Mexico, along with her younger sister, Alexia. She graduated with a degree in fashion design and marketing.

== Pageant career ==
In 2017, Malo began her career in beauty pageants, winning the title of Miss Estado de México which led her to compete nationally for the Miss México 2018 pageant, held at the Villa Toscana event Hermosillo, Sonora on May 5, 2018, where she placed in the top five. Vanessa Ponce of Mexico City won the title at the end of the event. A year later, Malo competed once again at Miss Mexico 2019. The contest was divided into two phases. She participated in the Miss Grand Mexico competition held in the Teatro Hermanos Dominguez, San Cristóbal de las Casas, Chiapas on June 1, 2019, where she emerged as the winner.

As Miss Grand Mexico 2019, Malo was the representative of Mexico at the Miss Grand International 2019. The final night was held on October 25, 2019 at Caracas, Venezuela, where finished as the first runner-up, making her the first Mexican to reach the highest placement for the first time at this pageant.

Awards and achievements
Preceded by (India) Meenakshi Chaudhary	Miss Grand International 1st Runner-Up; 2019	Succeeded by (Philippines) Samantha Bernardo
Preceded by (Jalisco) Lezly Díaz	Miss Grand Mexico; 2019	Succeeded by (Sinaloa) Angela Yuriar
