= Miss México 2019 =

- Date: September 20, 2019
- Presenters: Carlos Arenas; Monica Noguera
- Entertainment: Pipe Cross
- Venue: Desert of the Lions National Park, Cuajimalpa de Morelos, Mexico City, Mexico
- Broadcaster: Imagen Televisión
- Entrants: 32
- Placements: 16
- Winner: Ashley Alvídrez; Chihuahua
- Congeniality: Alejandra Bernal; Nuevo León
- Photogenic: Arleth Gutiérrez; Nayarit

Miss México 2019 was the third Miss México pageant, held at the Desert of the Lions National Park in Mexico City, Mexico, on September 20, 2019

Vanessa Ponce de León crowned Ashley Alvídrez Estrada of Chihuahua as her successor at the end of the event. Alvídrez represented Mexico at the Miss World 2019 pageant.

== Results ==
=== Placements ===
Placement	Contestant
Miss México 2019	Chihuahua – Ashley Alvídrez Estrada
1st Runner-Up	Veracruz – Marilú Acevedo
2nd Runner-Up	Chiapas – Wendy Sánchez §
Top 5	Colima – Vanesa Hernández; Hidalgo – Jessica Huerta
Top 10	Guerrero – Jennifer Vázquez §; Querétaro – Karen Gastelúm; Quintana Roo – Isabel Santoscoy; San Luis Potosí – Jessica Mendieta; Sinaloa – Ángela Yuriar
Top 16	Ciudad de México – Jeanette Karam; Guanajuato – Andrea Fuentes; Jalisco – Tania Morales; Morelos – Mariela Sanders; Puebla – Alexia Orozco; Sonora – Paulina Martínez

§ – Winners of the Multimedia Challenge and Beauty with Purpose, and got a direct pass to the semifinals as a result.

=== Regional Queens of Beauty ===
Title	Contestant
Miss México Northwest	Sinaloa - Ángela Yuriar
Miss México West	Colima - Vanesa Hernández
Miss México Center	Hidalgo - Jessica Huerta
Miss México Northeast	Veracruz - Marilú Acevedo
Miss México Southeast	Chiapas - Wendy Sánchez

=== Special awards ===
Award	Contestant
5K - Running for the Crown	Guanajuato - Andrea Fuentes
5K - Valle de Bravo	Guanajuato - Andrea Fuentes
Best Social Work	Morelos - Mariela Sanders
English Challenge Winner	Chihuahua - Ashley Alvídrez Estrada
History of Mexico Contest Winner	San Luis Potosí - Jessica Mendieta
Miss Congeniality	Nuevo León - Alejandra Bernal
Miss Photogenic	Nayarit - Arleth Gutiérrez
Mobstar Challenge Winner	Tamaulipas - Thalía Vázquez
Self Makeup Challenge Winner	Oaxaca - Laura Mojica

=== Challenges ===
==== Beauty With a Purpose ====
Final Result	Candidate
Winner	Guerrero - Jennifer Vázquez
Top 5	Chiapas - Wendy Sánchez; Ciudad de México - Jeanette Karam; Durango - Maria Elena Matuk; Morelos - Mariela Sanders
Top 10	Baja California - Maria Souza; Chihuahua - Ashley Alvídrez Estrada; Colima - Vanesa Hernández; San Luis Potosí - Jessica Mendieta; Veracruz - Marilú Acevedo

==== Talent ====
Final Result	Candidate
Winner	Chiapas - Wendy Sánchez
1st Runner-Up	Veracruz - Marilú Acevedo
2nd Runner-Up	Puebla - Alexia Orozco
Top 12	Ciudad de México - Jeanette Karam; Colima - Vanesa Hernández; Guanajuato - Andrea Fuentes; Guerrero - Jennifer Vazquez; Hidalgo - Jessica Huerta; Oaxaca - Laura Mojica; Querétaro - Karen Gastelúm; Tabasco - Andrea Aysa; Zacatecas - Itzayana Meza

==== Beach Beauty ====
Final Result	Candidate
Winner	Sinaloa - Ángela Yuriar
1st Runner-Up	Querétaro - Karen Gastelúm
2nd Runner-Up	Quintana Roo - Isabel Santoscoy
Top 12	Aguascalientes - Elizabeth de Alba; Chihuahua - Ashley Alvídrez Estrada; Coahuila - Poleth Urbina; Colima - Vanessa Hernandez; Hidalgo - Jessica Huerta; Jalisco - Tania Morales; Sonora - Paulina Martínez; Tamaulipas - Thalía Vázquez; Veracruz - Marilú Acevedo

==== Top Model ====
Final Result	Candidate
Winner	Sinaloa - Ángela Yuriar
1st Runner-Up	Veracruz - Marilú Acevedo
2nd Runner-Up	Campeche - Paloma Sandoval
Top 12	Aguascalientes - Elizabeth de Alba; Chihuahua - Ashley Alvídrez Estrada; Ciudad de México - Jeanette Karam; Coahuila - Poleth Urbina; Colima - Vanessa Hernandez; Nuevo León - Alejandra Bernal; Puebla - Alexia Orozco; Quintana Roo - Isabel Santoscoy; San Luis Potosí - Jessica Mendieta

==== Sports ====
Final Result	Candidate
Winner	Guanajuato - Andrea Fuentes
1st Runner-Up	Puebla - Alexia Orozco
2nd Runner-Up	Morelos - Mariela Sanders
Top 8	Chihuahua - Ashley Alvídrez Estrada; Ciudad de México - Jeanette Karam; Durango - Maria Elena Matuk; Tamaulipas - Thalía Vázquez; Zacatecas - Itzayana Meza

==== Dances of México ====
Final Result	Candidate
Top 5	Ciudad de México - Jeanette Karam; Colima - Vanessa Hernandez; Guerrero - Jennifer Vazquez; Jalisco - Tania Morales; Oaxaca - Laura Mojica
Top 12	Campeche - Paloma Sandoval; Chiapas - Wendy Sánchez; Michoacán - Elizabeth García; Puebla - Alexia Orozco; Quintana Roo - Isabel Santoscoy; Veracruz - Marilú Acevedo; Yucatán - Edsamar Hernández

==== Multimedia ====
Final Result	Candidate
Winner	Chiapas - Wendy Sánchez

== Judges ==
=== Final Judges ===
These are the members of the judges who evaluated the contestants during the finals:

- Jacqueline Aguilera - Miss World 1995 from Venezuela
- Mireia Lalaguna - Miss World 2015 from Spain
- Katherine González - Miss Teen International 1997
- Felicia Mercado - Miss Universe Mexico 1977
- Andrea Meza - Miss Mexico 2017 and Miss World Americas 2017
- Anabel Solis - Miss World Mexico 2010
- Leticia Murray - Miss Universe Mexico 2000
- Alfonso Waithsman - Makeup Artist and Imagine Advisor
- Cristina Cuellar - Image Director of Miss México Organization
- Jouffroy Maldonado - Miss México Official Dentist
- Arturo Gallo - Miss World Canada Communication and Media Advisor
- Juan Manuel Chaparro - Plastic Surgeon
- Óscar Madrazo - Fashion and Beauty Expert
- José Escobedo - Fan Representative Miss México Organization

=== Preliminary Judges ===
These are the members of the preliminary judges, who chose the 16 semifinalists, after seeing the candidates in during private interview sessions and catwalk sessions in swimsuits and evening gowns:

- Jacqueline Aguilera - Miss World 1995 from Venezuela
- Mireia Lalaguna - Miss World 2015 from Spain
- Katherine González - Miss Teen International 1997
- Felicia Mercado - Miss Universe Mexico 1977
- Andrea Meza - Miss Mexico 2017 and Miss World Americas 2017
- Anabel Solis - Miss World Mexico 2010
- Leticia Murray - Miss Universe Mexico 2000
- Alfonso Waithsman - Makeup Artist and Imagine Advisor
- Cristina Cuellar - Image Director of Miss México Organization
- Jouffroy Maldonado - Miss México Official Dentist
- Arturo Gallo - Miss World Canada Communication and Media Advisor

== Phase One Competition of Miss México 2019 ==
Miss México 2019: Phase 1
- Date: June 1, 2019
- Presenters: Alejandro Garcia; Yoana Gutierrez
- Venue: Hermanos Domínguez Theater, San Cristóbal de las Casas, Chiapas, Mexico
- Broadcaster: Channel 10 Chiapas; Facebook Live
- Entrants: 32
- Placements: 6
- Winner: María Malo; Estado de México; Kenia Ponce; Baja California

Phase 1 of Miss México was held at the Hermanos Domínguez Theater in the city of San Cristóbal de Las Casas, Chiapas, Mexico, on Saturday, June 1, 2019, and was broadcast live through Channel 10 Chiapas, as well as on the official Facebook pages of the national and international organization. The winners were María Malo of Estado de México (State of Mexico) and Kenia Ponce of Baja California. Malo represented Mexico at Miss Grand International 2019 and Ponce represented the country at Miss United Continents 2019.

=== Placements ===
Final results	Contestant
Miss México Grand 2019	Estado de México - María Malo
Miss México United Continents 2019	Baja California - Kenia Ponce
1st Runner-Up	Puebla - Alexia Orozco
2nd Runner-Up	Chiapas - Wendy Sánchez
3rd Runner-Up	Oaxaca - Laura Mojica
4th Runner-Up	Tabasco - Andrea Aysa §

- § Voted by the public via internet to complete the table of 6 finalists.

=== Final Judges ===
- Dr. Juan Manuel Chaparro - Plastic Surgeon
- Ericka Cruz - Miss Universe Mexico 2002
- Dr. Nabani Matus - Aesthetic Surgeon
- Gerardo Murray - Vice President of Commercial Strategy for Latin America at IHG - Intercontinental Hotels Group
- Dr. Nestor Morales - Dentist and Smile Designer
- Rebeca Segura - Veracruzana writer and painter and Lady of the Chiapaneca Society
- Clara Sosa - Miss Grand International 2018

=== Contest Stages ===
==== Miss Multimedia ====
Final Result	Candidate
Winner	Tabasco - Andrea Aysa
Top 10	Aguascalientes - Elizabeth de Alba; Durango - Maria Elena Matuk; Estado de México - Maria Malo; Guerrero - Jennifer Vazquez; Hidalgo - Jessica Huerta; Oaxaca - Laura Mojica; Sinaloa - Ángela Yuriar; Sonora - Paulina Martínez; Tamaulipas - Thalía Vázquez

==== State Costume ====
Final Result	Candidate
Winner	Estado de México - María Malo
Top 10	Baja California Sur - Itzayana Meza; Campeche - Paloma Sandoval; Chihuahua - Ashley Alvídrez Estrada; Durango - Maria Elena Matuk; Hidalgo - Jessica Huerta; Jalisco - Tania Morales; Oaxaca - Laura Mojica; Quintana Roo - Isabel Santoscoy; Yucatán - Edsamar Hernández

== Official Delegates ==
=== Contestants ===
State	Candidate	Age	Height	Hometown
Aguascalientes	Elizabeth de Alba Ruvalcaba	22	1.73 m (5 ft 8 in)	Aguascalientes
Baja California	María Souza	25	1.73 m (5 ft 8 in)	Guadalajara
Baja California Sur	Itzayana Meza Arce	21	1.78 m (5 ft 10 in)	Guerrero Negro
Campeche	Paloma Yazmín Sandoval Mendoza	22	1.70 m (5 ft 7 in)	Escárcega
Chiapas	Wendy Mariela Sánchez Aguilar	25	1.73 m (5 ft 8 in)	Tuxtla Gutiérrez
Chihuahua	Ashley Alvídrez Estrada	20	1.76 m (5 ft 9 1/2 in)	Juárez
Ciudad de México	Jeanette Nahil Karam Tovar	24	1.76 m (5 ft 9 1/2 in)	Coyoacán
Coahuila	Poleth Urbina Alvarado	23	1.83 m (6 ft 0 in)	Matamoros
Colima	Vanesa Hernández Pérez	25	1.81 m (5 ft 11 1/2 in)	Coquimatlán
Durango	María Elena Matuk Plantillas	22	1.67 m (5 ft 5 1/2 in)	Durango City
Estado de México	Alejandra González Chong	25	1.75 m (5 ft 9 in)	Aguascalientes
Guanajuato	Nuria Fuentes Andrea Salazar	23	1.78 m (5 ft 10 in)	León
Guerrero	Jennifer Vázquez Galeana	23	1.68 m (5 ft 6 in)	San Marcos
Hidalgo	Jessica Huerta Ramírez	20	1.72 m (5 ft 7 1/2 in)	Tizayuca
Jalisco	Tania Aleciram Morales Becerra	20	1.77 m (5 ft 9 1/2 in)	Ixtlahuacán de los Membrillos
Michoacán	Elizabeth García Álvarez	19	1.72 m (5 ft 7 1/2 in)	Tangancícuaro
Morelos	Claudia Mariela Sanders Ibarrola	26	1.70 m (5 ft 7 in)	Cuernavaca
Nayarit	Arlett Gutiérrez Corona	20	1.72 m (5 ft 7 1/2 in)	Ixtlán del Río
Nuevo León	Alejandra Estefanía Bernal Martínez	20	1.80 m (5 ft 11 in)	Ciudad Benito Juárez
Oaxaca	Laura Mojica Romero	23	1.72 m (5 ft 7 1/2 in)	Tuxtepec
Puebla	Alexia Orozco	22	1.71 m (5 ft 7 1/2 in)	Puebla
Querétaro	Karen Gastelúm Espinoza	25	1.74 m (5 ft 8 1/2 in)	Cuajimalpa
Quintana Roo	Fernanda Isabel Santoscoy Jiménez	24	1.78 m (5 ft 10 in)	Playa del Carmen
San Luis Potosí	Jessica Yatzumi Mendieta Méndez	24	1.73 m (5 ft 8 in)	Rio Verde
Sinaloa	Angela Michelle Leon Yuriar	18	1.78 m (5 ft 10 in)	Culiacán
Sonora	Paulina Martínez Rivera	25	1.81 m (5 ft 11 1/2 in)	Navojoa
Tabasco	Andrea Aysa Valenzuela	25	1.76 m (5 ft 9 1/2 in)	Emiliano Zapata
Tamaulipas	Thalía Vázquez Román	21	1.70 m (5 ft 7 in)	Reynosa
Tlaxcala	Angélica de Gyves			
Veracruz	María de Lourdes "Marilú" Acevedo Domínguez	25	1.70 m (5 ft 7 in)	Córdoba
Yucatán	Edsamar Suey Hernández Rodríguez	24	1.77 m (5 ft 9 1/2 in)	Mérida
Zacatecas	Perla Damayanti Santana Esparza	20	1.68 m (5 ft 6 in)	Villanueva

=== Phase 1 Only Contestants ===
The following contestants only competed in Phase 1 of the competition:

State	Candidate	Age	Height	Hometown
Baja California	Kenia Melissa Ponce Beltrán	26	1.71 m (5 ft 7 1/2 in)	Mexicali
Estado de México	María Malo Juvera Raimond Kedilhac	22	1.83 m (6 ft 0 in)	Huixquilucan
Tlaxcala	Daniela Fernanda Hernández Diaz	20	1.65 m (5 ft 5 in)	Chiautempan
Veracruz	Mónica Riaño Altrogge	22	1.78 m (5 ft 10 in)	Gutiérrez Zamora

== Notes ==
=== Replacements ===
- Colima - Kenia Pineda was stripped of her state title for breach of contract according to the Miss Colima State Organization and was replaced by Vanesa Hernández. However, Pineda reported physical and psychological abuse by Colima state coordinator Mike Vargas.
- Oaxaca - Naomi Rueda was originally appointed to represent Oaxaca in the national final. However, she resigned her title days before her coronation. Laura Mojica was appointed as a replacement.
