= Miss México 2018 =

2nd edition of the Miss Mexico pageant

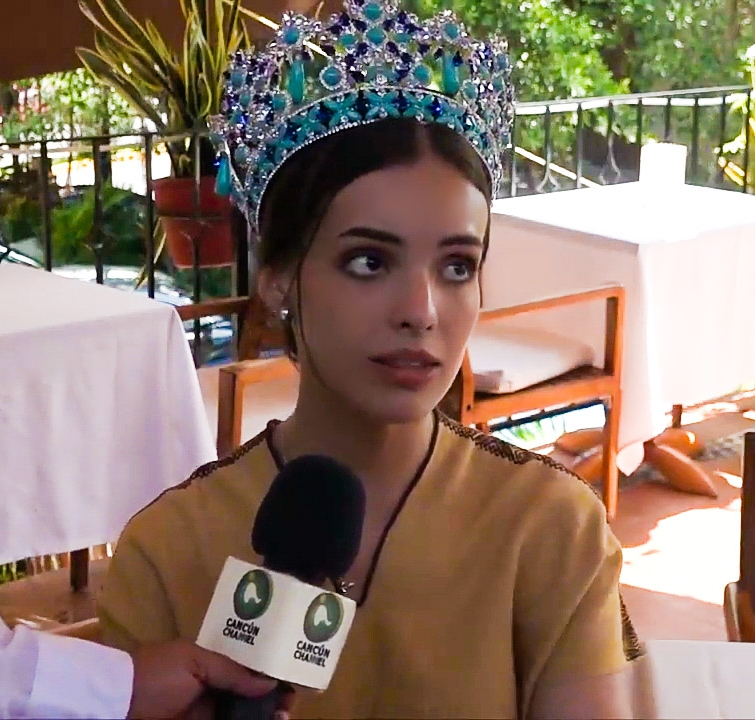
- Vanessa Ponce, Miss México City 2018, Miss México 2018 & Miss World 2018
- Date: May 5, 2018
- Presenters: Ericka Honstein; Carlos Arenas
- Entertainment: Daniela Pedali
- Venue: Imperial Hall of Villa Toscana Eventos, Hermosillo, Sonora, Mexico
- Broadcaster: 52MX; Telemax
- Entrants: 32
- Placements: 16
- Returns: Guanajuato
- Winner: Vanessa Ponce; Mexico City
- Congeniality: Priscila Viveros; Hidalgo
- Photogenic: Paula Bernal; Aguascalientes

Miss México 2018 was the second edition of the Miss México pageant, held at the Imperial Hall of Villa Toscana Eventos in Hermosillo, Sonora, Mexico, on May 5, 2018.

Andrea Meza of Chihuahua crowned Vanessa Ponce of Mexico City as her successor at the end of the event. Ponce represented Mexico in Miss World 2018.

== Results ==
=== Placements ===
| Placement | Contestant |
|---|---|
| Miss México 2018 | Mexico City – Vanessa Ponce |
| 1st Runner-Up | Quintana Roo – Minerva Luna |
| 2nd Runner-Up | Sinaloa – Diana Romero |
| Top 5 | Estado de México – María Malo; Michoacán – Ivonne Hernández |
| Top 10 | Aguascalientes – Paula Bernal; Baja California – Karen Aguilar; Chihuahua – Andrea Sáenz; Tabasco – Flora Magdaleno; Yucatán – Mónica Hernández |
| Top 16 | Campeche – Paola Gutiérrez; Chiapas – Grecia Esparza; Nuevo León – Mariana González; Sonora – Daniela Ochoa; Tlaxcala – Ely Martin; Veracruz – Alejandra Vargas |

=== Special awards ===
| Award | Contestant |
|---|---|
| 5K Race | Chihuahua - Andrea Sáenz |
| Best Social Work | Oaxaca - Minerva Gopar |
| History of Mexico Contest Winner | Mexico City - Vanessa Ponce de León |
| Miss Congeniality | Hidalgo - Priscila Viveros |
| Miss Photogenic | Aguascalientes - Paula Bernal |
| Most Beautiful Eyes | Quintana Roo - Minerva Luna |
| Most Beautiful Smile | Sinaloa - Diana Romero |
| Personal Grooming | Tamaulipas - Xaviera Ayala |

=== Challenges ===
==== Beauty With a Purpose ====
| Final Result | Candidate |
|---|---|
| Winner | Mexico City - Vanessa Ponce de León |
| Top 5 | Baja California Sur - Valeria Verdugo; Chiapas - Grecia Esparza; Oaxaca - Minerva Gopar; Tabasco - Flora Magdaleno |
| Top 11 | Baja California - Karen Aguilar; Campeche - Paola Gutiérrez; Estado de México - María Malo; Querétaro - Mayra Vásquez; Sinaloa - Diana Romero; Tlaxcala - Ely Martin |

==== Talent ====
| Final Result | Candidate |
|---|---|
| Winner | Yucatán - Mónica Hernández |
| 1st Runner-Up | Nayarit - Andrea González |
| 2nd Runner-Up | Sinaloa - Diana Romero |
| Top 12 | Baja California - Karen Aguilar; Campeche - Paola Gutiérrez; Chiapas - Grecia Esparza; Guerrero - Mavi Miranda; Michoacán - Ivonne Hernández; Puebla - Sharon Mejía; Querétaro - Mayra Vásquez; Sonora - Daniela Ochoa; Veracruz - Alejandra Vargas |

==== Beach Beauty ====
| Final Result | Candidate |
|---|---|
| Winner | Jalisco - Lezly Diaz |
| 1st Runner-Up | Sinaloa - Diana Romero |
| 2nd Runner-Up | Estado de México - María Malo |
| Top 12 | Aguascalientes - Paula Bernal; Chiapas - Grecia Esparza; Chihuahua - Andrea Sáenz; Colima - Lizbeth Rodríguez; Durango - Giselle Núñez; Michoacán - Ivonne Hernández; Puebla - Sharon Mejía; Quintana Roo - Minerva Luna; Veracruz - Alejandra Vargas |

==== Top Model ====
| Final Result | Candidate |
|---|---|
| Winner | Estado de México - María Malo |
| 1st Runner-Up | Guerrero - Mavi Miranda |
| 2nd Runner-Up | Mexico City - Vanessa Ponce de León |
| Top 5 | Aguascalientes - Paula Bernal; Chiapas - Grecia Esparza |
| Top 12 | Chihuahua - Andrea Sáenz; Jalisco - Lezly Diaz; Quintana Roo - Minerva Luna; San Luis Potosí - Fernanda Barbosa; Sinaloa - Diana Romero; Sonora - Daniela Ochoa; Veracruz - Alejandra Vargas |

==== Sports ====
| Final Result | Candidate |
|---|---|
| Winner | Yucatán - Mónica Hernández |
| 1st Runner-Up | Michoacán - Ivonne Hernández |
| 2nd Runner-Up | Zacatecas - Bárbara Gallegos |
| Top 8 | Baja California - Karen Aguilar; Mexico City - Vanessa Ponce de León; Jalisco - Lezly Diaz; Nayarit - Andrea González; Puebla - Sharon Mejía |

==== Dances of México ====
| Final Result | Candidate |
|---|---|
| Top 6 | Baja California - Karen Aguilar; Campeche - Paola Gutiérrez; Durango - Giselle Núñez; Michoacán - Ivonne Hernández; Quintana Roo - Minerva Luna; Sonora - Daniela Ochoa |
| Top 12 | Estado de México - María Malo; Jalisco - Lezly Diaz; Nayarit - Andrea González; Puebla - Sharon Mejía; Tlaxcala - Ely Martin; Zacatecas - Bárbara Gallegos |

==== Multimedia ====
| Final Result | Candidate |
|---|---|
| Winner | Tabasco - Flora Magdaleno |

== Judges ==
=== Final Judges ===
These are the members of the judges who evaluated the contestants during the finals:

- Mariana Berumen - Miss World Mexico 2012
- Daniela Álvarez - Miss World Mexico 2014
- Alexander González - Image Advisor and International Speaker
- Duc Vincie - International Fashion Designer
- Nabani Matus - Aesthetic Surgeon
- Gerardo Murray - Vice-president of Brands, Marketing and Business Strategy of Intercontinental Hotels Group
- Heriberto Martínez - Connoisseur of beauty contests

=== Preliminary Judges ===
These are the members of the preliminary judges, who chose the 16 semifinalists, after seeing the candidates in during private interview sessions and catwalk sessions in swimsuits and evening gowns:

- Mariana Berumen - Miss World Mexico 2012
- Daniela Álvarez - Miss World Mexico 2014
- Alexander González - Image Advisor and International Speaker
- Duc Vincie - International Fashion Designer
- Nabani Matus - Aesthetic Surgeon
- Gerardo Murray - Vice-president of Brands, Marketing and Business Strategy of Intercontinental Hotels Group
- Heriberto Martínez - Connoisseur of beauty contests

== Official Delegates ==
| State | Candidate | Age | Height | Hometown |
|---|---|---|---|---|
| Aguascalientes | Paula Bernal Martinez | 23 | 1.74 m (5 ft 8 1/2 in) | Aguascalientes |
| Baja California | Karen Aguilar García | 25 | 1.75 m (5 ft 9 in) | Mexicali |
| Baja California Sur | Valeria Castro Verdugo | 23 | 1.71 m (5 ft 7 1/2 in) | Cabo San Lucas |
| Campeche | Paola Gutiérrez Guerrero | 19 | 1.71 m (5 ft 7 1/2 in) | Campeche City |
| Chiapas | Grecia Esparza Nieto | 18 | 1.76 m (5 ft 9 1/2 in) | Tapachula |
| Chihuahua | Yamil Andrea Sáenz Castillo | 20 | 1.76 m (5 ft 9 1/2 in) | Cuauhtémoc |
| Ciudad de México | Silvia Vanessa Ponce de León Sánchez | 25 | 1.74 m (5 ft 8 1/2 in) | Mexico City |
| Coahuila | Karla Gabriela Campbell Zetina | 23 | 1.73 m (5 ft 8 in) | Saltillo |
| Colima | Lizbeth Fernanda Rodríguez Álvarez | 18 | 1.70 m (5 ft 7 in) | Villa de Álvarez |
| Durango | Giselle Núñez Ochoa | 23 | 1.75 m (5 ft 9 in) | Santiago Papasquiaro |
| Estado de México | Maria Malo Juvera Raimond Kedilhac | 21 | 1.83 m (6 ft 0 in) | Huixquilucan |
| Guanajuato | Angélica Hernández López | 23 | 1.82 m (5 ft 11 1/2 in) | León |
| Guerrero | Mavi Miranda Esparza | 23 | 1.83 m (6 ft 0 in) | Cocula |
| Hidalgo | Priscila Viveros Estrada | 21 | 1.74 m (5 ft 8 1/2 in) | Tezontepec de Aldama |
| Jalisco | Lezly Viridiana Díaz Pérez | 22 | 1.73 m (5 ft 8 in) | Guadalajara |
| Michoacán | Ivonne Hernández Mendoza | 24 | 1.74 m (5 ft 8 1/2 in) | Morelia |
| Morelos | Priscila Moreno Valverde | 18 | 1.82 m (5 ft 11 1/2 in) | Cuautla |
| Nayarit | Andrea González Gómez | 22 | 1.72 m (5 ft 7 1/2 in) | Bahía de Banderas |
| Nuevo León | Mariana González Nava | 22 | 1.72 m (5 ft 7 1/2 in) | Monterrey |
| Oaxaca | Minerva Gopar Santos | 24 | 1.74 m (5 ft 8 1/2 in) | Ejutla de Crespo |
| Puebla | Sharon Mejía Cruz | 21 | 1.68 m (5 ft 6 in) | Puebla |
| Querétaro | Mayra Alejandra Vásquez Lara | 23 | 1.76 m (5 ft 9 1/2 in) | Querétaro City |
| Quintana Roo | Whitney Minerva Luna Correa | 23 | 1.73 m (5 ft 8 in) | Tlaquepaque |
| San Luis Potosí | María Fernanda Barbosa Gutiérrez | 24 | 1.75 m (5 ft 9 in) | San Luis Potosí |
| Sinaloa | Diana Romero Ortega | 25 | 1.74 m (5 ft 8 1/2 in) | Mazatlán |
| Sonora | Daniela Ochoa Torres | 20 | 1.74 m (5 ft 8 1/2 in) | Cajeme |
| Tabasco | Flora Elena Magdaleno Campos | 24 | 1.73 m (5 ft 8 in) | Paraíso |
| Tamaulipas | Xaviera Ayala Castillo | 23 | 1.67 m (5 ft 5 1/2 in) | Ciudad Madero |
| Tlaxcala | Elizabeth "Ely" Ramírez Martin | 25 | 1.82 m (5 ft 11 1/2 in) | Ixtenco |
| Veracruz | Alejandra Vargas Lara | 20 | 1.76 m (5 ft 9 1/2 in) | Poza Rica |
| Yucatán | Mónica Fernanda Hernández Reynaga | 23 | 1.71 m (5 ft 7 1/2 in) | Mérida |
| Zacatecas | Diana Bárbara Gallegos Torres | 21 | 1.73 m (5 ft 8 in) | Zacatecas City |

== Notes ==
=== Replacements ===
- Michoacán - Ivonne Hernández was appointed to represent Michoacán after the original state titleholder, Daniela Frutos, resigned for personal reasons.
