= Nuestra Belleza Zacatecas 2012 =

- Date: July 12, 2012
- Entertainment: Dan Masciarelli, Kristina Koban
- Venue: Teatro Ramón López Velarde, Zacatecas, Zacatecas
- Broadcaster: Televisa
- Entrants: 10
- Placements: 3
- Winner: Artemisa Rivera; Zacatecas City

Nuestra Belleza Zacatecas 2012, was held at the Teatro Ramón López Velarde of Zacatecas, Zacatecas on July 12, 2012. At the conclusion of the final night of competition Artemisa River from Zacatecas City was crown the winner. Rivera was crowned by Nuestra Belleza Zacatecas titleholder Michelle Román. Ten contestants competed for the title.

== Results ==
=== Placements ===
Final results	Contestant
Nuestra Belleza Zacatecas 2012	Artemisa Rivera
1st Runner-up	Roxana Reyes Herrera
2nd Runner-up	Edna Denisse Chávez

== Contestants ==
Hometown	Contestant
Cd. Cuauhtémoc	Roxana Reyes Herrera
Fresnillo	Olivia Noemí Espino Rodríguez
Fresnillo	Itzel Bethzaida Martínez Rucobo Rincón
Guadalupe	Judith Alejandra Martínez Rivera
Jalapa	Edna Denisse Chávez Ruiz
Jerez	Daniela Medina Revele
Juchipila	Elizabeth Cervantes Luján
Teúl de González Ortega	Itzel Uribe Carrillo
Zacatecas	Thalía Artemisa Rivera Montañez
Zacatecas	María Victoria Loya Rico

|Zacatecas || Mariell Galldri
