= Rebeca Tamez =

Rebeca Lynn Tamez Jones (born October 18, 1975 in Ciudad Victoria, Tamaulipas) is a Mexican artist and beauty pageant titleholder who won Nuestra Belleza México 1996. The daughter of a Mexican father and an American mother, Rebeca represented her country in the 1997 Miss Universe pageant on May 16, 1997 in Miami Beach, Florida, U.S..

She joined the Mexican musical group Garibaldi during its last year, and she appeared in former Mexican soap operas. Rebeca Tamez also represented Mexico in the Miss Continente Americano in 1997 winning the crown and the title.

Preceded by Vanessa Guzmán	Nuestra Belleza México; 1996	Succeeded by Katty Fuentes
