= Andrea Meza =

Mexican beauty queen, Miss Universe 2020

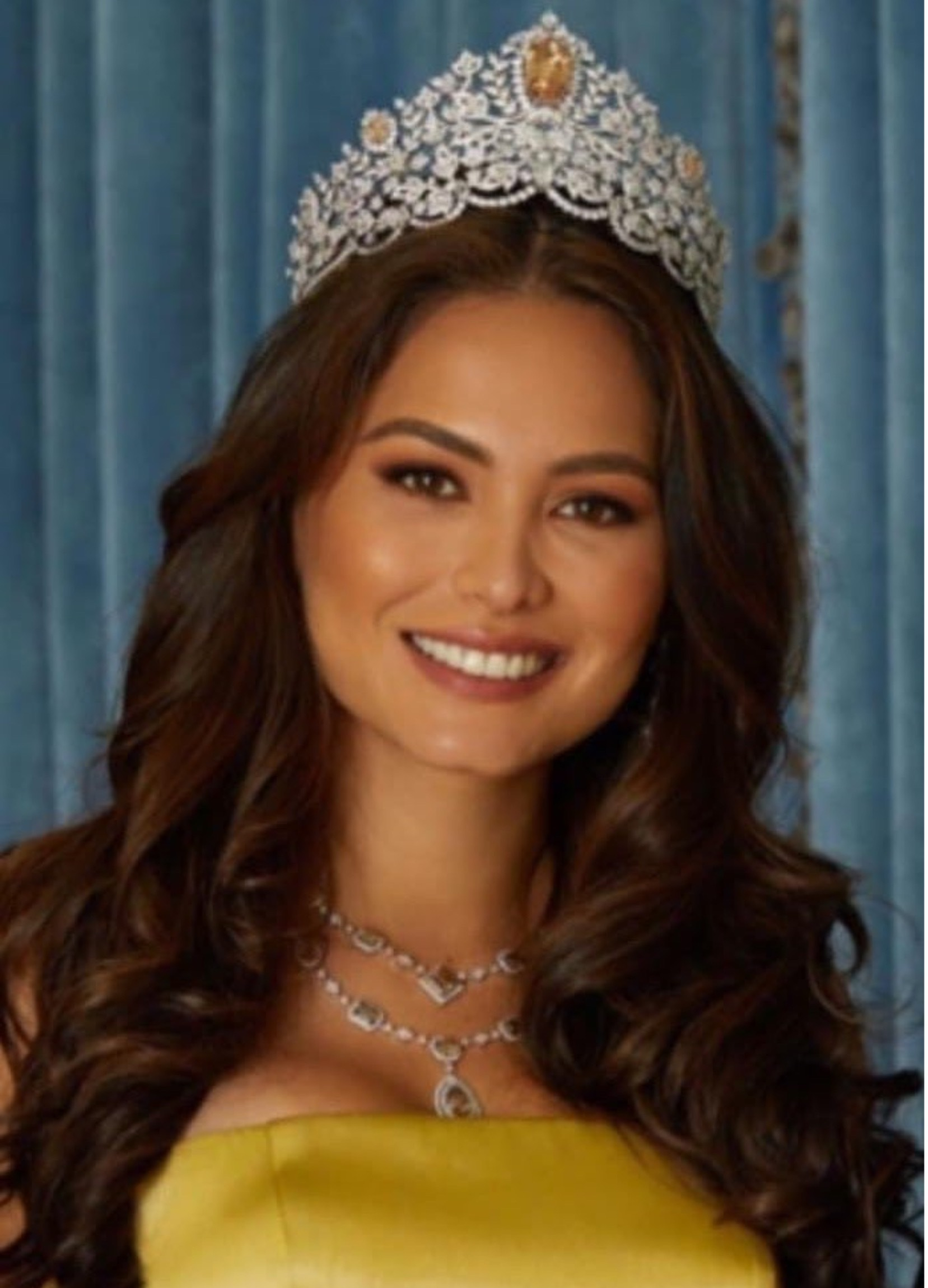
- Meza in 2021
- Born: Alma Andrea Meza Carmona; 13 August 1994 (age 32); Chihuahua, Chihuahua, Mexico
- Education: Autonomous University of Chihuahua (BS)
- Height: 1.80 m (5 ft 11 in)
- Beauty pageant titleholder
- Title: Miss Chihuahua 2016; Miss Mexico 2017; Miss World Americas 2017; Mexicana Universal Chihuahua 2020; Mexicana Universal 2020; Miss Universe 2020
- Major competitions: Miss Mexico 2017; (Winner); Miss World 2017; (1st Runner-up); Mexicana Universal 2020; (Winner); Miss Universe 2020; (Winner)

Alma Andrea Meza Carmona (Spanish pronunciation: [anˈdɾea ˈmesa]; born 13 August 1994) is a Mexican beauty pageant titleholder best known for winning the title of Miss Universe 2020. The third Mexican contestant to win the title, Meza holds the record for the shortest complete reign in Miss Universe history to date.

Meza previously won Mexicana Universal 2020 and Miss Mexico 2017, and finished as the first runner-up at Miss World 2017. In November 2025, Meza served as one of eleven judges on the selection committee at the 74th annual Miss Universe 2025 pageant, held in Nonthaburi, Thailand.

== Early life and education ==
Alma Andrea Meza Carmona was born on 13 August 1994 in Chihuahua City, Mexico. She grew up in Chihuahua City as the eldest of three daughters, and is of partial Chinese ancestry.

After completing secondary school, Meza enrolled at the Autonomous University of Chihuahua, where she studied software engineering. She graduated with a degree in 2017 and began working in Mexico as a software engineer in addition to her career as a model.

== Pageantry ==
=== Miss México 2017 ===
Meza began her pageantry career in 2016, after she was selected to represent Chihuahua at Miss World Mexico 2016. Meza was one of the two contestants awarded a crown, being crowned as Miss México 2017. Ana Girault, representing Mexico City, was crowned Miss México 2016 and given the opportunity to represent Mexico at Miss World 2016, while Meza was given the opportunity to represent Mexico at Miss World 2017. Additionally, Meza won the sports challenge at the competition.

=== Miss World 2017 ===
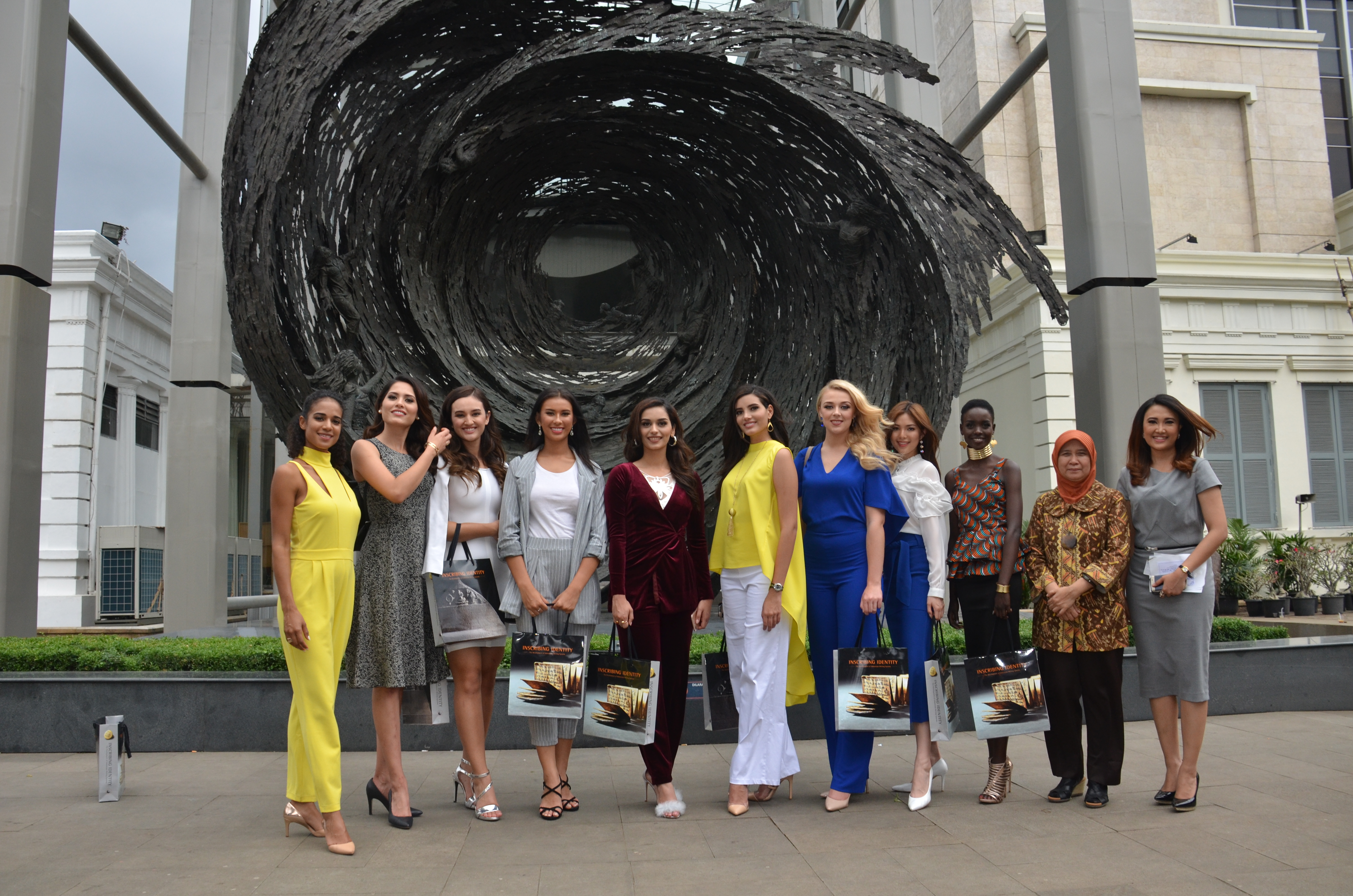
Meza (second from the left) with Miss World 2016 and 2017 Continental Queens visiting the National Museum of Indonesia

As the winner of Miss México 2017, Meza represented Mexico at Miss World 2017, held on 18 November 2017 at Sanya City Arena in Sanya, China. During the pre-pageant activities, Meza won group 16 of the Head-to-Head Challenge, securing her direct entry into the top 40. Additionally, she placed as the fourth runner-up in the talent competition.

In the finals of the competition, Meza reached the top five, and Julia Morley announced her as the first runner-up behind the winner, Manushi Chhillar from India. Meza was also crowned Miss World Americas, placing her within the 2017 Miss World Continental Queens of Beauty.

=== Mexicana Universal 2020 ===
In 2020, Meza won Mexicana Universal Chihuahua 2020, and went on to represent Chihuahua at Mexicana Universal 2020, where she emerged as the winner. During the pre-pageant activities, Meza won six challenges, including the sports challenge. The final was held on 29 November 2020 in Querétaro City.

=== Miss Universe 2020 ===
As Mexicana Universal, Meza represented Mexico at Miss Universe 2020 and won the title, on 16 May 2021, at the Seminole Hard Rock Hotel & Casino Hollywood in Hollywood, Florida, after the event was postponed from late 2020 to May 2021 due to the COVID-19 pandemic. Meza was crowned by the outgoing titleholder, Zozibini Tunzi of South Africa. She became the third Mexican woman to win the title, following Lupita Jones in 1991 and Ximena Navarrete in 2010.

This marked Mexico's second consecutive year in the top three at Miss Universe, following Sofía Aragón, Mexicana Universal 2019, who finished as the second runner-up at Miss Universe 2019. Meza also surpassed Brook Lee's record of being the oldest contestant to win at the age of 26 years and 276 days. However, this record was later broken during the Miss Universe 2022 competition when R'Bonney Gabriel won at the age of 28 years and 300 days.

As Miss Universe, Meza traveled to various cities within the United States, South Africa, the Bahamas, Dominican Republic, Puerto Rico, Israel, and her home country of Mexico.

After her reign, Meza was succeeded as Mexicana Universal 2021 by Débora Hallal.

Awards and achievements
Preceded by (Mexico City) Ana Girault	Miss Mexico; 2017	Succeeded by (Mexico City) Vanessa Ponce
Preceded by (United States) Audra Mari	Miss World Americas; 2017	Succeeded by (Panama) Solaris Barba
Preceded by (Dominican Republic) Yaritza Reyes	1st Runner-up Miss World; 2017	Succeeded by (Thailand) Nicolene Limsnukan
Preceded by (Jalisco) Sofía Aragón	Mexicana Universal; 2020	Succeeded by (Sinaloa) Débora Hallal
Preceded by (South Africa) Zozibini Tunzi	Miss Universe; 2020	Succeeded by (India) Harnaaz Sandhu
