= Mexicana Universal 2020 =

- Date: November 29, 2020
- Presenters: Mónica Noguera, Ana Alicia Alba
- Venue: Hotel Misión Grand Juriquilla Santiago de Querétaro
- Broadcaster: Imagen TV
- Entrants: 30
- Placements: 15
- Withdrawals: Durango; Estado de México; Guerrero; Zacatecas
- Returns: Campeche; Coahuila; Quintana Roo; Tlaxcala
- Winner: Andrea Meza; Chihuahua

Mexicana Universal 2020 was the third edition of the Mexicana Universal pageant, held at the Hotel Misión Grand Juriquilla in Santiago de Querétaro, Mexico, on November 29, 2020.

Claudia Lozano of Nuevo León crowned Andrea Meza of Chihuahua at the end event. Meza represented Mexico at the Miss Universe 2020 pageant which she won to become the third Mexican Miss Universe.

== Results ==
=== Placements ===
Color keys

- The contestant won in an International pageant.
- The contestant was a Finalist/Runner-up in an International pageant.
- The contestant was a Semi-Finalist in an International pageant.
- The contestant did not place.

Placement	Contestant	International Placement
Mexicana Universal 2020	Chihuahua – Andrea Meza	Winner – Miss Universe 2020
Mexicana Hispanoamericana 2021	Nuevo León – Andrea Bazarte	Winner – Reina Hispanoamericana 2021
Mexicana Charm International 2021	San Luis Potosí – Karen Bustos	Top 20 – Miss Charm 2023
Mexicana Latinoamericana 2021	Oaxaca – Ángeles Castro	Resigned – Nuestra Latinoamericana 2022
1st Runner-Up (Appointed as Mexicana Universal 2021)	Sinaloa – Débora Hallal	Unplaced – Miss Universe 2021
2nd Runner-Up (Represented Panama at Miss Universe 2021)	Ciudad de México – Brenda Smith	Top 16 – Miss Universe 2021
3rd Runner-Up (Appointed as Miss Orb Int'l Mexico 2022)	Puebla – Camila Canto	Winner – Miss Orb International 2022
Top 10	Colima – Ivonne Barocio; Sonora – Karla Ochoa; Yucatán – Natalia Elizarráras	
Top 15	Baja California – Grisell Osuna; Coahuila – Ana Lucila Linaje; Jalisco – Michel Sosa; Tamaulipas – Patricia Morato; Veracruz – Estefanía Ruíz	

== Contestants ==
Thirty contestants competed for the title.

State	Contestant	Age	Hometown	Super Power of Woman
Aguascalientes	Sandra Pamela Barrera Medel	26	Aguascalientes	Inspirar a los demás
Baja California	María Grisell Osuna Benett	24	Tijuana	Robar
Baja California Sur	Italy Yedid Reynoso Arvizu	24	Loreto	Ser auténtica
Campeche	Ivanna Díaz Vázquez	22	Ciudad del Carmen	Mi Valentía
Chiapas	Paulina Ruíz Hernández	22	Tuxtla Gutiérrez	Contagiar de Alegría
Chihuahua	Alma Andrea Meza Carmona	26	Chihuahua	Mi Determinación
Ciudad de México	Brenda Andrea Smith Lezama	26	Ciudad de México	Amplificar las voces que no han sido escuchadas
Ciudad de México	Carolina Lucero Castillo	26	Coyoacán	Mantener mi Autenticidad aún en la Adversidad
Coahuila	Ana Lucila Linaje Ezquivel	24	Monclova	Mi Determinación
Colima	Ivonne Lizeth Barocio Sandoval	22	Villa de Álvarez	La Perseverancia
Guanajuato	Luz María Guillén Jiménez	22	León	Mi Voz que Inspira
Hidalgo	Gloria Griselda Garzón Quiroz	26	Pachuca	Crer en Mí Misma
Jalisco	Michel López Sosa	24	Guadalajara	Buscar la Belleza de lo que me rodea
Michoacán	Adriana Zacarías Avilés	26	Morelia	La Resiliencia
Morelos	Grisel Ramírez Roldán	22	Cuernavaca	Mi Espiritú Inquebrantable
Nayarit	Ana Victoria Leija Navidad	24	Tepic	Alzar mi Voz de Defensa
Nuevo León	Andrea Paola Martínez Bazarte	28	Monterrey	Ser Valiente
Oaxaca	Alma Ángeles Castro Chávez	22	Oaxaca	Compartir Mis Raíces
Puebla	Camila Canto Vera	20	Zacatlán	La Grandeza de mi Escencia
Querétaro	Alejandra Isabel Sánchez Díaz de León	28	Querétaro	Mirar desde el Interior de las Personas
Quintana Roo	Monserrat Sánchez Flores	21	Playa del Carmen	Ser Audazmente Imparable
San Luis Potosí	Ana Karen Bustos Gutiérrez	23	San Luis Potosi	Maximizar y Empoderar a las Personas
Sinaloa	Débora Hallal Ayala	24	Los Mochis	Mi Fuerza Transformadora
Sonora	Karla Idolina Ochoa Gutiérrez	24	Hermosillo	Mi Determinación y Disciplina
Sonora	Nathalia Martínez Vázquez	24	Ciudad Obregón	El Amor Propio
Tabasco	Thania de la Fuente Córdova	23	Comacalco	La Resiliencia
Tamaulipas	Claudia Patricia Morato García	28	Matamoros	Conectar atraves de Mi Voz
Tlaxcala	Yessica Lizeth Olvera Pérez	22	Apizaco	Ser mas Valiente que las Adversidades
Veracruz	Estefanía Ruíz Íñiguez	26	Úrsulo Galván	Impulsar a otros a Alcanzar sus Sueños
Yucatán	Natalia Elizarráras Flores	24	Mérida	Ser Auténtica

== Charms Award ==
Some candidates throughout the concentration were winning different challenges, obtaining a badge according to their performance:

State	Reto Fotografico (Beauty)	Reto Deportivo	Reto "Upgrade my Look" de Liverpool	Reto de Idioma Inglés	Reto de Redes Sociales	Reto Pasarela	Mejor Actitud	Reto "look Urbano" de Liverpool	Mejor Foto "look urbano"	Reto Rendimiento Físico	Reto Deportivo	Reto Comunicación "Proy. Soc."	Reto Campaña Digital	Reto Adopcion de perros	Reto Rally	Reto Compromiso Social	Desfile con Mascotas	Mejor Actitud	Reto Fotográfico	Reto Comunicación	Reto Pasarela	Mujeres Empoderadas	Mejor Actitud	TOTAL
Aguascalientes																							GANADORA👑	1 Achievement
Baja California															GANADORA👑									1 Achievement
Baja California Sur																							GANADORA👑	1 Achievement
CDMX				GANADORA👑										GANADORA👑						GANADORA👑	GANADORA👑			4 Achievements
CDMX Designada																					GANADORA👑			1 Achievement
Chiapas														GANADORA👑								GANADORA👑		2 Achievements
Chihuahua		GANADORA👑							GANADORA👑			GANADORA👑		GANADORA👑			GANADORA👑					GANADORA👑		6 Achievements
Coahuila					GANADORA👑					GANADORA👑											GANADORA👑			3 Achievements
Colima	GANADORA👑											GANADORA👑			GANADORA👑									3 Achievements
Hidalgo															GANADORA👑	GANADORA👑								2 Achievements
Jalisco					GANADORA👑									GANADORA👑		GANADORA👑					GANADORA👑			4 Achievements
Michoacán							GANADORA👑					GANADORA👑	GANADORA👑	GANADORA👑								GANADORA👑		5 Achievements
Morelos															GANADORA👑								GANADORA👑	2 Achievements
Nayarit											GANADORA👑										GANADORA👑			2 Achievements
Nuevo Leon	GANADORA👑	GANADORA👑		GANADORA👑		GANADORA👑	GANADORA👑		GANADORA👑										GANADORA👑	GANADORA👑				8 Achievements
Oaxaca							GANADORA👑								GANADORA👑			GANADORA👑	GANADORA👑	GANADORA👑	GANADORA👑			6 Achievements
Puebla										GANADORA👑								GANADORA👑						2 Achievements
Queretaro														GANADORA👑										1 Achievement
Quintana Roo								GANADORA👑								GANADORA👑								2 Achievements
San Luis Potosí	GANADORA👑		GANADORA👑			GANADORA👑											GANADORA👑	GANADORA👑	GANADORA👑					6 Achievements
Sinaloa					GANADORA👑		GANADORA👑								GANADORA👑	GANADORA👑	GANADORA👑					GANADORA👑		6 Achievements
Sonora										GANADORA👑				GANADORA👑										2 Achievements
Sonora Designada																		GANADORA👑				GANADORA👑		2 Achievements
Tabasco														GANADORA👑										1 Achievement
Tamaulipas																GANADORA👑							GANADORA👑	2 Achievements
Tlaxcala																							GANADORA👑	1 Achievement
Veracruz									GANADORA👑						GANADORA👑			GANADORA👑						3 Achievements
Yucatán		GANADORA👑		GANADORA👑			GANADORA👑																	3 Achievements
Zacatecas ≠														GANADORA👑										1 Achievement

Simbología

	Premios otorgados en la semana 1
	Premios otorgados en la semana 2
	Premios otorgados en la semana 3
≠	Apesar de haber ganado premios, se retiró de la competencia

== Crossovers ==
Contestants who previously competed or will be competing in other national beauty pageants or in international beauty pageants.

Miss Universe

- 2021: (Mexico City) Ciudad de México Brenda Smith (as Panama; Top°16)

Miss World

- 2017: Chihuahua Andrea Meza (as Mexico; 1st Runner-Up)

Miss Earth

- 2017: San Luis Potosí Karen Bustos (as Mexico)

Miss Teen USA

- 2013: (Mexico City) Ciudad de México Brenda Smith (as Missouri; Top°16)

Nuestra Belleza Latina

- 2018: Mexico Andrea Bazarte (Top°15)
- 2018: Mexico Brenda Smith (Top°15)

Miss Tourism International

- 2018: Tamaulipas Patricia Morato (Top°10)

Nuestra Belleza México

- 2017: Veracruz Estefanía Ruiz
- 2016: Coahuila Ana Lucila Linaje

Miss México

- 2016: Chihuahua Andrea Meza (Winner)
- 2016: Tamaulipas Patricia Morato (Top°16)

Mexicana Universal Jalisco

- 2018: Jalisco Michel Sosa (1st Runner-up)

Mexicana Universal Sinaloa

- 2018: Sinaloa Deborah Hallal (2nd Runner-up)

Mexicana Universal Tabasco

- 2017: Tabasco Thania de la Fuente (2nd Runner-up)

Miss Teen Mundial

- 2016: Sinaloa Débora Hallal (Top°10)

Teen Universe México

- 2016: Campeche Ivanna Díaz (Top°16)

Reina de la Feria Nacional de San Marcos

- 2018: Aguascalientes Pamela Barrera (Winner)

Miss Tourism Worldwide

- 2019: Zacatecas Grecia Victoria Soto

Señorita México

- 2018: Quintana Roo Monserrat Sánchez Flores (Winner)

== Notes ==
=== Withdrawals ===
- Durango
- (State of Mexico) Estado de México
- Guerrero
- Zacatecas

=== Returns ===
- Last competed in 2018:
  - Campeche
  - Coahuila
  - Quintana Roo
  - Tlaxcala
