= Vanessa Ponce =

Mexican model and beauty queen, Miss World 2018 winner

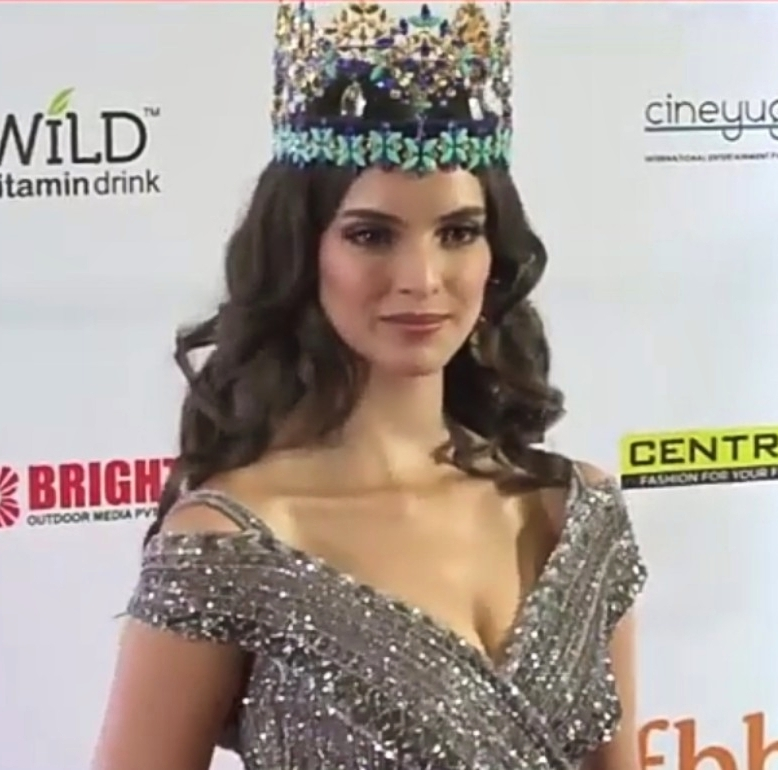
- Ponce in 2019
- Born: Silvia Vanessa Ponce de León Sánchez; 7 March 1992 (age 34); Mexico City, Mexico
- Height: 5 ft 8 1/2 in (1.74 m)
- Beauty pageant titleholder
- Title: Miss Ciudad de México 2018; Miss México 2018; Miss World 2018
- Hair color: Black
- Eye color: Dark Brown
- Major competitions: Miss Ciudad de México 2018; (Winner); Miss México 2018; (Winner); Miss World 2018; (Winner)

Silvia Vanessa Ponce de León Sánchez (born 7 March 1992), known simply as Vanessa Ponce, is a Mexican model and beauty queen who was crowned Miss World 2018. She is the first Mexican to be crowned as Miss World. In the history of the Miss World competition, she holds the record for being the oldest winner thus far.

== Life and career ==
Vanessa Ponce was born in Mexico City, Mexico on 7 March 1992. She studied international commerce at the University of Guanajuato, in the state of Guanajuato. She resided for ten years in the State of Aguascalientes, Mexico, and for five years in the State of Guanajuato. She then returned to her hometown in Mexico City, Mexico to live and work.

She speaks English, in addition to her mother tongue Spanish.

During the Miss World 2018 competition, she promoted her project called "NaVali", whose objective is to help the children of the indigenous Mexican day laborers who emigrated from the State of Guerrero, Mexico to the State of Guanajuato. She also works in a school called Nenemi dedicated to the intercultural education for indigenous people.

In April 14, 2022, She was married to her private boyfriend at Carmel Valley in California, United States.

== Pageantry ==
=== Mexico's Next Top Model ===
At the age of 22, she participated in the fifth season of Mexico's Next Top Model, which ran in 2014. At the end of the reality show, she was eventually declared as the winner. Her prize package included a cash prize of Mex$300,000, an appearance at the New York Fashion Week, $50,000 worth of Mary Kay cosmetics, a modeling contract with Queta Rojas management, a Volkswagen Tiguan, $125,000 worth of Tommy Hilfiger apparel and an editorial spread in Glamour magazine.

=== Miss México 2018 ===
She was crowned Miss Ciudad de México 2018, and later was crowned Miss México 2018 on 5 May 2018, in the Imperial Hall of Villa Toscana, Sonora, to represent Mexico in Miss World 2018. She was crowned by Miss Mexico 2017 and Miss World Americas 2017 outgoing Andrea Meza from the State of Chihuahua, Mexico.

=== Miss World 2018 ===
She represented Mexico at the 68th edition of Miss World. During the final question and answer round of the contest, she was asked - “How would you use your influence as Miss World to help others?” she replied by stating:

“I would use my position just as I have been doing for the past three years, by being an example. We all can be an example of good in the world. We all have to care, we all have to love and we all have to be kind. It doesn't cost a thing and helping is not that hard. You just have to go out there and there will always be someone who needs what you have to offer. So, help anyone you can guys.”

At the end of the event, she won the title and was crowned Miss World 2018, on 8 December 2018 in the city of Sanya, China. She was crowned by the outgoing titleholder, Manushi Chhillar of India.

Vanessa Ponce de Leon is the oldest Miss World as of now. She won the contest when she was 26 years and 276 days, surpassing the previous record of Miss World 1989, Aneta Kręglicka, who was 24 years old and 244 days old at the time of her victory.

During her reign as Miss World, she lived in England and visited China, Thailand, Indonesia, India, Uganda, the Philippines, Ghana, Singapore, Poland, Tanzania, the Bahamas and various cities in her home country Mexico.

On 19 August 2019, she gave an interview in Women Fitness about her exercise routine, diet, workout, skincare and hair care, under the title 'Miss World Vanessa Ponce de León: An Unmatched Beauty'.

At the end of her reign, Ponce crowned her successor Toni-Ann Singh of Jamaica as Miss World 2019 in London on 14 December 2019. She finished her reign at 371 days.

Awards and achievements
Preceded by (India) Manushi Chhillar	Miss World; 2018	Succeeded by (Jamaica) Toni-Ann Singh
Preceded by Andrea Meza	Miss Mexico; 2018	Succeeded by Ashley Alvídrez
Preceded by Ana Girault	Miss Ciudad de México; 2018	Succeeded by Jeanette Karam
