= Miss México 2016 =

- Date: October 14, 2016
- Presenters: Karla Carrillo; Mauricio Cuevas
- Entertainment: Julian Figueroa; Ballet de Michoacán; The Orchestra and Choir of the Transformation of Miguel Bernal Jiménez
- Venue: Teatro Morelos, Morelia, Michoacán, Mexico
- Entrants: 31
- Placements: 16
- Withdrawals: Guanajuato
- Returns: Campeche; Guerrero; Quintana Roo
- Winner: Ana Girault (Mexico City) Ciudad de México; Andrea Meza (Chihuahua (state)) Chihuahua

Miss World México 2016, now referred to as Miss México 2016, is the very first edition of a new pageant organization formed by Hugo Castellanos after Lupita Jones, president of Nuestra Belleza México (now Mexicana Universal), lost the franchise with Miss World. The pageant held at Teatro Morelos of Morelia, Michoacán on 14 October 2016. 31 contestants of the Mexican Republic competed for the national title. Two winners were crowned at the end of the event: Ana Girault of Ciudad de México (Mexico City) as Miss World Mexico 2016/Miss México 2016, and Andrea Meza of Chihuahua as Miss World Mexico 2017/Miss México 2017. Ana Girault of Ciudad de México (Mexico City) was crowned as the titleholder for 2016 and Andrea Meza of Chihuahua was crowned as the titleholder for 2017. Meza represented the country at Miss World 2017 in China.

== Results ==
=== Placements ===
Placement	Contestant
Miss World Mexico 2016	Ciudad de México – Ana Girault
Miss World Mexico 2017	Chihuahua – Andrea Meza
Miss Supranational Mexico 2016	Guerrero – Samantha Leyva
Miss Grand Mexico 2016	Jalisco – Yoana Gutiérrez
Reina Internacional del Café México 2016	Veracruz – Marilú Acevedo
Top 10	Durango – María Elena Bechelani; Querétaro – Ruth Grosser; Quintana Roo – Fabiola Peniche; Sonora – Norhely Celaya; Zacatecas – Roxana Reyes
Top 16	Aguascalientes – Giovanna Alfieri; Chiapas – Phegda Bustillos; Nayarit – Camila Villalvazo; San Luis Potosí – Alejandra Delgadillo; Sinaloa – Melissa Lizarraga; Tamaulipas – Patricia Morato

== Judges ==
=== Final Judges ===
These are the members of the jury who evaluated the contestants:

- José Medel - Beauty Contest Historian
- Misael Espinoza - Models and Public Relations agent of the Queta Rojas Agency
- Aldo Esparza - Mister Mexico 2016
- Alejo Rios - Trainer of Misses in Los Angeles
- Alejandro Mata - Fashion Designer

=== Preliminary Judges ===
These are the members of the preliminary jury, who chose the 16 semifinalists, after seeing the candidates in private during interviews and catwalk in swimsuits and gala:

- José Medel - Beauty Contest Historian
- Karla Carrillo - Nuestra Belleza México 2009, Model, Actress and Television Host
- Aldo Esparza - Mister Mexico 2016
- Dra. Vicky Benitez - Director of Modstil, a collaborator of Elite Mexico
- Alejandro Mata - Fashion Designer

== Candidates ==
31 Candidates have been officially chosen

State	Candidate	Age	Height (m)	Origin
Aguascalientes	Giovanna Alfieri González	24	1.75	Aguascalientes
Baja California	Analy Soliz Wong	25	1.75	Mexicali
Baja California Sur	Cristina Zacarías Flores	25	1.76	La Paz
Campeche	Monique Lomelí Canavaggio	24	1.76	Campeche City
Chiapas	Phegda Becerra Bustillo	24	1.80	Tuxtla Gutiérrez
(Chihuahua (state)) Chihuahua	Alma Andrea Meza Carmona	22	1.82	Chihuahua City
Coahuila	Liliana Rodríguez Saucedo	25	1.75	Ramos Arizpe
Colima	Claudia Delgado Munguía	24	1.75	Colima City
(Mexico City) Ciudad de México	Ana Girault Contreras	25	1.82	Mexico City
Durango	María Elena Bechelani Ánima	24	1.73	Durango
(State of Mexico) Estado de México	Eva Liliana Velasquez Ye	24	1.78	Naucalpan de Juarez
Guerrero	Samantha Leyva Trujillo	24	1.82	Acapulco
(Hidalgo (state)) Hidalgo	Jennifer Rodríguez Sosa	25	1.75	Pachuca
Jalisco	Yoana Gutiérrez Vázquez	24	1.80	San Miguel el Alto
Michoacán	María Nefertari González Nuñez	24	1.68	Lázaro Cárdenas
Morelos	Ximena Cardoso Gutiérrez	24	1.80	Cuernavaca
Nayarit	Camila Villalvazo Osoria	18	1.73	Tepic
Nuevo León	Mariel Mátar Herrera	25	1.75	San Pedro Garza Garcia
Oaxaca	Mitzy Ruschke Lira	25	1.70	San Pedro Pochutla
Puebla	Giovanna de la Barreda Angon	25	1.70	Puebla
Querétaro	Ruth Grosser Alcántara	25	1.87	Corregidora
Quintana Roo	Fabiola Peniche Gómez	21	1.75	Cancún
Sinaloa	Melissa Carolina Lizárraga Castro	25	1.75	Culiacán
San Luis Potosí	Alejandra Delgadillo Salazar	24	1.81	San Luis Potosí
Sonora	Norhely Celaya Bracamontes	25	1.82	Hermosillo
Tabasco	Yussihey Litzahally Vidal Celorio	24	1.66	Villahermosa
Tamaulipas	Claudia Patricia Morato García	24	1.72	Matamoros
Tlaxcala	Areli García González	25	1.72	Tlaxcala
Veracruz	Marilú Acevedo Dominguez	24	1.76	Córdoba
Yucatán	María Carolina Estrada Fritz	25	1.78	Mérida
Zacatecas	Roxana Reyes Herrera	24	1.78	Cuauhtémoc

== Challenges ==
=== Sports ===
Final Result	Candidate
(gold) Winner	(Chihuahua (state)) Chihuahua - Andrea Meza
(silver) 1st Runner-Up	San Luis Potosí - Alejandra Delgadillo
(bronze) 2nd Runner-Up	Colima - Claudia Delgado
Top 5	Nuevo León - Andrea Garza; Tlaxcala - Areli García

=== Top Model ===
Final Result	Candidate
Winner	Zacatecas - Roxana Reyes
1st Runner-Up	Jalisco - Yoana Gutiérrez
2nd Runner-Up	Chihuahua - Andrea Meza
Top 10	Ciudad de México - Ana Girault; Coahuila - Liliana Rodríguez; Guerrero - Samantha Leyva; Morelos - Ximena Cardoso; Nayarit - Camila Villalvazo; San Luis Potosí - Alejandra Delgadillo; Sonora - Norhely Celaya

=== Beach Beauty ===
Final Result	Candidate
Winner	San Luis Potosí - Alejandra Delgadillo
1st Runner-Up	Oaxaca - Mittzy Ruschke
2nd Runner-Up	Jalisco - Yoana Gutiérrez
Top 12	Ciudad de México - Ana Girault; Durango - María Elena Bechelani; Guerrero - Samantha Leyva; Michoacán - Nefertari González; Nuevo León - Andrea Garza; Tabasco - Yussihey Vidal; Tamaulipas - Patricia Morato; Veracruz - Marilú Acevedo; Zacatecas - Roxana Reyes

=== Beauty With a Purpose ===
Final Result	Candidate
Winner	Chiapas - Phegda Bustillo
Top 5	Aguascalientes - Giovanna Alfieri; (Mexico City) Ciudad de México - Ana Girault; Guerrero - Samantha Leyva; Veracruz - Marilú Acevedo
Top 12	Baja California Sur - Cristina Zacarías; Campeche - Monique Lomelí; Chihuahua - Andrea Meza; Colima - Claudia Delgado; (Hidalgo (state)) Hidalgo - Jennifer Rodríguez; Sonora - Norhely Celaya; Yucatán - Carolina Estrada

=== Talent ===
Final Result	Candidate
Winner	Tamaulipas - Patricia Morato
1st Runner-up	Guerrero - Samantha Leyva
2nd Runner-up	Durango - María Elena Bechelani; Querétaro - Ruth Grosser
Top 12	Campeche - Itziar Alarcón; (Mexico City) Ciudad de México - Ana Girault; Chiapas - Jennifer Vázquez; Chihuahua - Andrea Meza; Coahuila - Liliana Rodríguez; Nayarit - Camila Villalvazo; Sinaloa - Melissa Lizárraga; Veracruz - Marilú Acevedo

=== Golf Challenge ===
Final Result	Candidate
Winner	(Mexico City) Ciudad de México - Ana Girault
1st Runner-Up	Coahuila - Liliana Rodríguez
2nd Runner-Up	Baja California - Analy Solís

=== Multimedia ===
Final Result	Candidate
Winner	Guerrero - Samantha Leyva
1st Runner-Up	Chiapas - Phegda Bustillo
2nd Runner-Up	Michoacán - Nefertari González
Top 10	Chihuahua - Andrea Meza; (Mexico City) Ciudad de México - Ana Girault; Colima - Claudia Delgado; Jalisco - Yoana Gutiérrez; Nuevo León - Andrea Garza; Tabasco - Yussihey Vidal; Zacatecas - Roxana Reyes

==== Dances of México ====
Final Result	Candidate
Top 6	Aguascalientes - Giovanna Alfieri; Campeche - Monique Lomelí; Guerrero - Samantha Leyva; Michoacán - Nefertari González; Nuevo León - Andrea Garza; Veracruz - Marilú Acevedo

== About the contestants ==
- Aguascalientes – Giovana Alfieri participated in Nuestra Belleza Aguascalientes 2015, and is the actual "Reina de la Feria de San Marcos".
- Coahuila – Liliana Saucedo was Miss Earth Coahuila 2014 and Top 16 in Miss Earth México 2014.
- Guanajuato – Renata Aguirre resigned from the competition a few days before the finale because of online bullying.
- Jalisco – Yoanna Gutierrez won the Regional pageant of Señorita Turismo Región de los Altos in 2013.
- Nayarit – Camila Villalvazo was Miss Teen Universe Nayarit 2015.
- San Luis Potosí – Veronica Sánchez who participated in Nuestra Belleza México 2012 resigned from the title after getting an offer for a job at an international model agency. Alejandra Delgadillo from Nuevo León takes the thrown of Miss San Luis Potosí 2016.
- Sinaloa – Melissa Lizarraga participated in Nuestra Belleza Sinaloa in 2015 and was placed as the first runner up.
- Sonora - Norhely Celaya participated in Nuestra Belleza Sonora 2009 where she was placed as the second runner up and was finalist in Nuestra Belleza Sonora 2011.
- Tabasco – Yussihey Vidal was Miss Earth Tabasco 2011 and finished in second place (Miss Air Mexico or First Runner-Up) in Miss Earth Mexico 2011 and 2013 she won Flor Tabasco in representing to Jonuta.
- Tamaulipas – Patricia Morato participated in Nuestra Belleza Tamualipas 2016, where she was placed as the first runner up.
- Veracruz – Marilú Acevedo participated in Nuestra Belleza Veracruz 2012, where she was placed as the first runner up.
- Zacatecas - Roxana Reyes participated in Nuestra Belleza Zacatecas 2012, where she was placed as the 1st Runner-up.
