= Miss México Organization =

Mexican beauty pageant organization

Miss México
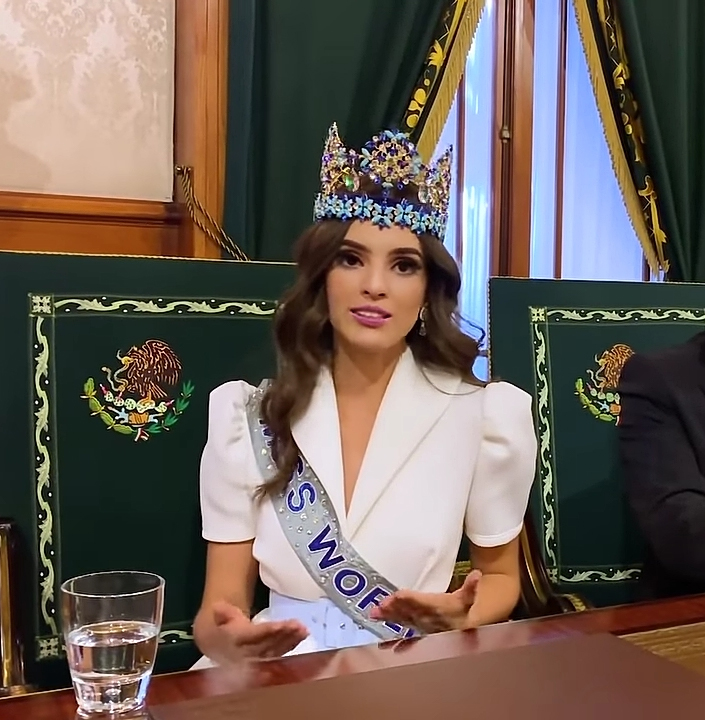
- Miss México 2018 Vanessa Ponce
- Formation: 2013; 13 years ago
- Headquarters: Mexico City
- Location: Mexico
- Official language: Spanish
- President: Hugo Castellanos
- Affiliations: Miss World; Mister World; Miss and Mister Supranational; Miss Cosmo; Top Model of the World; Reina Internacional del Café; Miss Global City; Miss Elite World

Miss México is a national beauty pageant in Mexico. It selects contestants for Miss World, Miss Supranational, Miss Cosmo and Top Model of the World.

In association with Telemax and Televisa, the pageant is directed by Hugo Castellanos. It has 32 contestants from 31 states and Mexico D.F. who compete for the title of Miss México or Miss World Mexico. The 2016 winner was crowned in the Teatro José María Morelos in Morelia, Michoacan, in September 2016.

Since 2013, the pageant has been responsible for sending contestants to Miss Supranational, and all have been from Jalisco. In 2016. The organization acquired the franchise to select the contestant for Miss World and Mister World.

The organization produced one Miss World winner in 2018, one Top Model of the World winner in 2023, and one Reina Internacional del Café winner in 2017.<

== Titleholders ==
Color key

- : Declared the winner
- : Finished as a runner-up
- : Finished as one of the finalists or semi-finalists

Year	Titleholder	State	Venue	Placement at International
2013	Jacqueline Morales	Jalisco	Appointed	1st Runner-up
2014	Natalia Sánchez	Jalisco	Appointed	
2015	Karina Martín	Jalisco	Appointed	4th Runner-up
2016	Ana Girault	Ciudad de México	Morelia, Michoacán	
2017	Andrea Meza	Chihuahua	Morelia, Michoacán	1st Runner-up
2018	Vanessa Ponce	Ciudad de México	Hermosillo, Sonora	Miss World 2018
2019	Ashley Alvídrez	Chihuahua	Mexico City	Top 12
2021	Karolina Vidales	Michoacán	Chihuahua City	Top 6
2023	Alejandra Díaz	San Luis Potosí	Morelia, Michoacán	
2024	Maryely Leal	Sinaloa	Mexico City	
2025	Cassandra García	Morelos	Monterrey, Nuevo León	TBA

== Representatives at major international pageants ==
Below are the names of the delegates enlisted by the Miss México Organization to represent the country at major worldwide beauty contests. They are listed according to the year in which they participated in their respective international pageants, which do not always coincide with when their national crowning took place.

Color key

- : Declared the winner
- : Finished as a runner-up
- : Finished as one of the finalist/semi-finalists

=== Miss World ===
Year	Miss World Mexico	State	Competition performance		
Year	Miss World Mexico	State	Placements	Title/Award	Fast Track
2026	Cassandra García Olea	Morelos			
2025	Maryely Leal Cervantes	Sinaloa			Miss World Multimedia (Top 20); Miss World Sports (Top 32)
2023	Alejandra Díaz de León Soler	San Luis Potosí			
2021	Karolina Vidales Valdovinos	Michoacán	Top 6	Miss World Sports	Miss World Sports (Winner); Miss World Multimedia (Top 10); Miss World Top Model (Top 13); Head-to-Head Challenge (Top 16); Beauty with a Purpose (Top 28)
~~2020~~	Due to the impact of COVID-19 pandemic, no pageant in 2020				
2019	Ashley Alvídrez Estrada	Chihuahua	Top 12		Head to Head Challenge (Winner); Miss World Multimedia (2° Place); Miss World Top Model (Top 40)
2018	Silvia Vanessa Ponce de León Sánchez	Ciudad de México	Miss World 2018		Head to Head Challenge (Winner); Miss World Multimedia (2° Place); Beauty With A Purpose (3° Place); Miss World Sport (Top 24); Miss World Top Model (Top 32)
2017	Alma Andrea Meza Carmona	Chihuahua	1st Runner-up	Miss World Americas	Head to Head Challenge (Winner); Miss World Multimedia (2° Place); Miss World Talent (5° Place); Miss World Sports (Top 25); Miss World Top Model (Top 30)
2016	Ana Girault Contreras	Ciudad de México			

=== Miss Supranational ===
Year	Miss Supranational Mexico	State	Competition performance	
Year	Miss Supranational Mexico	State	Placements	Special award(s)
2027	Isabel Sarahí Zamora Soria	Jalisco	TBA	
2026	Sofía Zamora Macías	Colima		
2025	Angie López Melchum	Hidalgo	Top 25	From The Ground Up
2024	Yamil Andrea Sáenz Castillo	Chihuahua	Top 25	Miss Supranational America
2023	Vanessa López Quijada	Sonora	Top 12	
2022	Regina González Salman	Quintana Roo		
2021	Palmira Ruiz	Oaxaca		
~~2020~~	Due to COVID-19 pandemic, no pageant in 2020			
2019	Dariana Giselle Urista Soto	Sinaloa	Top 25	Best National Costume
2018	Diana Romero Ortega	Sinaloa	4th Runner-Up	Best National Costume
2017	Samantha Leyva Trujillo	Guerrero	Top 25	
2016	Cynthia de la Vega	Nuevo León	Top 25	
2015	Karina Martín	Jalisco	4th Runner-Up	Miss Fashion City
2014	Natalia Sánchez Díaz	Jalisco		
2013	Jacqueline Alejandra Morales Pérez	Jalisco	1st Runner-Up	

== State tally ==
Below is a table of the top rankings for the Miss Mexico pageant, of the thirty-two Mexican states, based on all results from 2013 to the most recent competition.

Rank	State	Miss World Mexico	Miss Supranational Mexico	Miss Cosmo Mexico	Top Model of the World Mexico	Reina Internacional del Café México	Total
1	Chihuahua	2	1				3
2	Mexico City	2					2
3	Sinaloa	1	2	1		1	5
4	Morelos	1			2		3
5	Michoacán	1			1		2
6	San Luis Potosí	1					1
7	Jalisco		4		2		6
8	Sonora		1		1		2
9	Colima		1			1	2
10	Hidalgo		1				1
10	Guerrero		1				1
10	Nuevo León		1				1
11	Tabasco			1			1
11	USA Mexico			1			1
12	Oaxaca				2	2	4
13	Tlaxcala				1		1
13	Aguascalientes				1		1
14	Yucatán					2	2
15	Nayarit					1	1
15	Chiapas					1	1
15	Veracruz					1	1

== Delegates at other pageants ==
=== Miss Cosmo ===
Year	Miss Cosmo Mexico	State	Competition performance	
Year	Miss Cosmo Mexico	State	Placements	Special award(s)
2026	Esmeralda Meza Justiniano	Tabasco	TBA	
2025	Ángela Michelle León Yuriar	Sinaloa	Top 20	
2024	Melody Deyanira Murguía Reyes	USA Mexico	Top 10	

=== Top Model of the World ===
Year	Top Model of the World Mexico	State	Competition performance	
Year	Top Model of the World Mexico	State	Placements	Special award(s)
2026	Sara Cruz Porras	Oaxaca		
2025	María Fernanda López Hernández	Jalisco	Top 6	Miss Congeniality
2024	Grecia Paulina Miranda Salgado	Morelos	Top 6	
2023	Mariana Macías Ornelas	Jalisco	Top Model of the World 2023	
2022	Fedra Alondra Pérez Solís	Tlaxcala		
2020	Priscila Natalie Moreno Valverde	Morelos	1st Runner-up	
2019	Elizabeth de Alba Ruvalcaba	Aguascalientes	Top 15	
2018	Ivonne Hernández Mendoza	Michoacan	Top 5	Miss Photogenic
2017	Norhely Rocio Celaya Bracamontes	Sonora	2nd Runner-up	
Did not compete between 2014—2016
2013	Mittzy Delfina Ruschke Lira	Oaxaca	Top 15	

=== Reinado Internacional del Café ===
Year	Reinado Internacional del Café México	State	Competition performance	
Year	Reinado Internacional del Café México	State	Placements	Special award(s)
2026	Ruslana Zicaru Remenyuk	Nayarit	2nd Princess	Queen of the Police
2025	Danna Paola Ávalos Larrañaga	Oaxaca	Top 12	
2024	Karla Astrid Maraboto Rivas	Sinaloa	3rd Princess	
2023	Ana Paulina Rivero Hernández	Yucatán		
2022	Adriana Daniela Ramírez Cruz	Colima		
2020	Laura Mojica Romero	Oaxaca	Vice Queen	
2019	Monica Hernández Reynaga	Yucatán		
2018	Phegda Alkaith Becerra Bustillo	Chiapas		
2017	María de Lourdes Acevedo Domínguez	Veracruz	Reinado Internacional del Café 2017	

=== Miss Global City ===
Year	Miss Global City Mexico	State	Competition performance	
Year	Miss Global City Mexico	State	Placements	Special award(s)
2025	Sofía Zamora Macías	Colima		
Due to the COVID-19 pandemic, no competition held between 2020—2024
2019	Diana Romero Ortega	Sinaloa	1st Runner-up	Best National Costume
2018	Giselle Núñez Ochoa	Durango	Miss Global City 2018	

=== Miss Elite World ===
Year	Miss Elite Mexico	State	Competition performance	
Year	Miss Elite Mexico	State	Placements	Special award(s)
2026	Luisana García Alderete	Chihuahua	TBA	
2024	Sofía González Fonseca	Nuevo León	3rd Runner-up	Miss Elite Americas
2023	Vanessa Rodelo Mendivi	Querétaro		
2022	Evelyn Álvarez Armendáriz	Nuevo León	Top 10	
2021	Fernanda Pumar Gómez	Veracruz	Miss Elite World 2021	Best National Costume

== See also ==
- Mr World Mexico
- Mister México
- Mexicana Universal
- Miss Grand Mexico
- Miss Earth México
