= Mexicana Universal Colima =

- Formation: 1994 (as Nuestra Belleza Colima); 2017 (as Mexicana Universal Colima)
- Type: Beauty Pageant
- Headquarters: Colima
- Location: Mexico
- Local Coordinator: Andrea Shelley

Mexicana Universal Colima (until 2016 called Nuestra Belleza Colima) is a state-level contest in the state of Colima, Mexico, which selects the state representative for the national contest Mexicana Universal (formerly called Nuestra Belleza México), thus aspiring to represent the country internationally on one of the platforms offered.

The state organization has achieved the following results since 1994:

- Winner: 5 (2006, 2017, 2021, 2022, 2025)
- 2nd Runner-up: 1 (2014)
- 3rd Runner-up: 2 (2007, 2018)
- Top 5/6: 1 (1994)
- Top 10/11/12: 1 (2019)
- Top 15/16: 4 (1995, 1997, 2015, 2016)
- Top 20/21: 1 (2000)
- Unplaced: 12 (1996, 1998, 1999, 2001, 2002, 2003, 2008, 2009, 2011, 2012, 2013, 2023)
- Absences: 2 (2004, 2005)

== National Queens ==
- Valeria Espinoza - Mexicana Internacional 2026
- Valeria Villanueva - Mexicana Internacional 2023
- Itzia García - Mexicana Internacional 2022
- Andrea Toscano - Mexicana Internacional 2019 (Designated)
- Andrea Toscano - Mexicana Universal 2018
- Lorena Sevilla - Nuestra Belleza Internacional México 2015 (Designated)
- Denisse Guzmán - Miss Costa Maya México 1999 (Designated)

== International Queens ==
- Denisse Guzmán - Miss Costa Maya International 1999

== Titleholders ==
The following are the names of the annual winners of Mexicana Universal Colima, listed in ascending order, as well as their results during the national Mexicana Universal pageant. State queens who represented the country in a current or past franchise of the national organization are also highlighted in a specific color.

Current Franchises:

- Competed at Miss Grand International.
- Competed at Miss International.
- Competed at Miss Charm.
- Competed at Reina Hispanoamericana.
- Competed at Miss Orb International.
- Competed at Nuestra Latinoamericana Universal.

Former Franchises:

- Competed at Miss Universe.
- Competed at Miss World.
- Competed at Miss Continente Americano.
- Competed at Miss Costa Maya International.
- Competed at Miss Atlántico Internacional.
- Competed at Miss Verano Viña del Mar.
- Competed at Reina Internacional del Café.
- Competed at Reina Internacional de las Flores.
- Competed at Señorita Continente Americano.
- Competed at Nuestra Belleza Internacional.

Year	Titleholder	Hometown	Placement	Special Award	Notes
2025	Norma Valeria Espinoza Ramos	Colima	Mexicana Internacional	-	Will compete at Miss International 2026; 1st Runner-up at Mexicana Universal Colima 2023; Was born in Guerrero
2024	In 2024, due to changes in the dates of the national pageant, the election of the state queens was postponed for one year.				
2023	Fernanda Rincón Pérez	Manzanillo	-	-	Martha Pérez's daughter, Nuestra Belleza Colima 1995
2022	Valeria López Villanueva	Manzanillo	Mexicana Internacional	-	Competed at Miss International 2024; Teen Universe México 2015; Teen Universe Colima 2015
2021	Itzia Margarita García Jiménez	Manzanillo	Mexicana Internacional	-	Top 7 at Miss International 2023
2020	In 2020, due to the contingency of COVID-19 there was a lag in the year of the state contest				
2019	Ivonne Lizeth Barocio Sandoval	Villa de Álvarez	Top 10	Steps to Fame	-
2018	Ángela Margarita Delgado Hernández	Tecomán	3rd Runner-up	-	-
2017	Andrea Isabel Toscano Ramírez	Manzanillo	Mexicana Universal	Personality Fraiche; Best National Costume	1st Runner-up at Miss International 2019; Mexicana Internacional 2019; Competed at Miss Universe 2018
Until 2016 the Title was Nuestra Belleza Colima
2016	Margarita Magaña Vega	Colima	Top 15	Miss Top Model	-
2015	Giovanna Salazar García	Villa de Álvarez	Top 15	-	-
2014	Lorena Marlene Sevilla Mesina	Colima	2nd Runner-up	Miss Talent	3rd Runner-up at Miss Universe Mexico 2024; Miss Universe Colima 2024; Top 10 at Miss International 2015; Nuestra Belleza Internacional México 2015
2013	Karen Estefanía Arceo Gallegos	Colima	-	-	-
2012	Mirna Guadalupe Parra Orozco	Armería	-	-	Competed at Reina de la Feria de Todos los Santos Colima 2011; Reina Armería 2010
2011	Ana Karen Martínez Salazar	Manzanillo	-	-	-
2010	Brenda Geraldine Valencia Madrigal	Villa de Álvarez	Did Not Compete	-	Reina de la Feria de Todos los Santos Colima 2009
2009	Giannina Giselle Huerta Dueñas	Villa de Alvarez	-	-	Top 15 at Miss Tourism Queen of the Year International 2010; Miss Tourism Queen México 2010
2008	Roxana Espinoza Morentin	Villa de Álvarez	-	-	-
2007	Irene Chavira Maravilla	Manzanillo	3rd Runner-up	-	-
2006	Carolina Morán Gordillo	Manzanillo	Nuestra Belleza Mundo México	The Queens Choice	Miss World Americas 2007; 2nd Runner-up at Miss World 2007
2005	No candidate was sent				
2004	No candidate was sent				
2003	Karina Gutiérrez Verdugo	Colima	-	-	-
2002	Edith Marisol García Hernández	Colima	-	-	-
2001	Laura Tayde Mancilla Alonso	Colima	-	-	-
2000	Martha Yadira Martínez	Colima	Top 20	-	Top 20 at Nuestra Belleza Mundo México 2000
1999	Marcela Bueno Reyes	Colima	-	-	-
1998	Denisse Zarahid Guzmán Virgen	Colima	-	-	Miss Costa Maya International 1999; Miss Costa Maya México 1999
1997	Karla Ofelia Cortéz Figueroa	Colima	Top 16	-	-
1996	Alma Alicia de la Torre Robledo	Colima	-	-	-
1995	Martha Peréz Rodríguez	Colima	Top 16	-	Fernanda Rincón's mother, Mexicana Universal Colima 2023
1994	Gloría Michel Ramírez	Colima	Top 6	-	-

== Designated Contestants ==
Starting in 2000, states were allowed to have more than one candidate, as some states were not sending candidates for various reasons. The following contestants from Colima were invited to compete in the national pageant alongside the reigning queen, and in some cases, they achieved even better results.

Year	Titleholder	Hometown	Placement	Special Award	Notes
2001	María Rosario Meza Anguiano	Colima	-		1st Runner-up at Nuestra Belleza Colima 2001

== See also ==
- Miss Colima
