= List of Nuestra Belleza México editions =

The following is a list of Nuestra Belleza México pageant editions and information.

Year	Edition	Date	Venue	Host State	Entrants
1994	1st	November 13	Auditorio Benito Juárez, Zapopan	Jalisco	32
1995	2nd	October 22	Teatro Morelos, Toluca	State of Mexico	32
1996	3rd	September 22	Centro de Convenciones, Cancún	Quintana Roo	32
1997	4th	September 20	Salon Teotihuacan, Centro Internacional de Convenciones Acapulco, Acapulco	Guerrero	32
1998	5th	September 19	Salon Teotihuacan, Centro Internacional de Convenciones Acapulco, Acapulco	Guerrero	32
1999	6th	September 12	Lienzo Charro "Cuna de la Charrería", Pachuca	Hidalgo	32
2000	7th	September 2	Auditorio Emilio Sánchez Piedras, Apizaco	Tlaxcala	43
2001	8th	September 28	Aeropuerto Internacional "Lic. Adolfo López Mateos", Toluca	State of Mexico	47
2002	9th	September 6	World Trade Center, Boca del Río	Veracruz	33
2003	10th	September 5	Teatro del Arte, Morelia	Michoacán	38
2004	11th	September 11	Teatro Tangamanga, San Luis Potosí	San Luis Potosí	25
2005	12th	September 2	Antiguo Taller de Locomotoras, Aguascalientes	Aguascalientes	32
2006	13th	September 2	Espacio Cultural Metropolitano, Tampico	Tamaulipas	30
2007	14th	October 6	Auditorio "Profr. Manuel Bonilla Valle", Manzanillo	Colima	33
2008	15th	September 20	Arena Monterrey, Monterrey	Nuevo León	33
2009	16th	September 20	Centro de Convenciones Yucatán Siglo XXI, Mérida	Yucatán	34
2010	17th	September 25	Auditorio del Parque Las Maravillas, Saltillo	Coahuila	31
2011	18th	August 20	Centro Internacional de Convenciones, Puerto Vallarta	Jalisco	34
2012	19th	September 1	Poliforum del Centro de Convenciones, Tuxtla Gutiérrez	Chiapas	35
2013	20th	October 19	Aeropuerto Internacional "Lic. Adolfo López Mateos", Toluca	State of Mexico	33
2014	21st	October 25	Jardines de México, Jojutla	Morelos	32
2016	22nd	January 31	Foro 2, Televisa San Angel, Mexico City	Mexico City	29
2017	23rd	March 11	Foro 5, Televisa San Angel, Mexico City	Mexico City	32
2018	24th	June 3	Foro, TV Azteca, Mexico City	Mexico City	32
2019	25th	June 23	Foro, TV Azteca, Mexico City	Mexico City	31
2020	26th	November 29	Hotel Misión Grand Juriquilla, Querétaro	Querétaro	30
2022	27th	May 21	Centro de Convenciones, San Luis Potosí	San Luis Potosí	31
2023	28th	September 2	Centro de Convenciones y Exposiciones, Aguascalientes	Aguascalientes	32
2025	29th	September 4	Hotel Holiday Inn Trade Center, Mexico City	Mexico City	23
2026	30th	August 6	Teatro Auditorio Charles Chaplin, Guadalajara	Jalisco	31
