= Mexicana Universal Guerrero =

- Formation: 1994 (as Nuestra Belleza Guerrero); 2017 (as Mexicana Universal Guerrero)
- Type: Beauty Pageant
- Headquarters: Acapulco
- Location: Mexico
- Local Coordinator: Guillermo Ulises González

Mexicana Universal Guerrero (until 2016 called Nuestra Belleza Guerrero) is a state-level contest in the state of Guerrero, Mexico, which selects the state representative for the national contest Mexicana Universal (formerly called Nuestra Belleza México), thus aspiring to represent the country internationally on one of the platforms offered.

The state organization has achieved the following results since 1994:

- 1st Runner-up: 1 (2022)
- 3rd Runner-up: 1 (2017)
- 4th Runner-up: 1 (1995)
- Top 10/11/12: 2 (2004, 2023)
- Top 20/21: 1 (2018)
- Unplaced: 13 (1994, 1996, 1997, 1998, 1999, 2003, 2006, 2008, 2009, 2010, 2012, 2013, 2025)
- Absences: 11 (2000, 2001, 2002, 2005, 2007, 2011, 2014, 2015, 2016, 2019, 2021)

== Titleholders ==
The following are the names of the annual winners of Mexicana Universal Guerrero, listed in ascending order, as well as their results during the national Mexicana Universal pageant. State queens who represented the country in a current or past franchise of the national organization are also highlighted in a specific color.

Current Franchises:

- Competed at Miss Grand International.
- Competed at Miss International.
- Competed at Miss Charm.
- Competed at Reina Hispanoamericana.
- Competed at Miss Orb International.
- Competed at Nuestra Latinoamericana Universal.

Former Franchises:

- Competed at Miss Universe.
- Competed at Miss World.
- Competed at Miss Continente Americano.
- Competed at Miss Costa Maya International.
- Competed at Miss Atlántico Internacional.
- Competed at Miss Verano Viña del Mar.
- Competed at Reina Internacional del Café.
- Competed at Reina Internacional de las Flores.
- Competed at Señorita Continente Americano.
- Competed at Nuestra Belleza Internacional.

Year	Titleholder	Hometown	Placement	Special Award	Notes
2025	Lucero Fabiola Béjar Nájera	Chilpancingo	-	-	Miss Earth Puebla 2025; Competed at Miss Turismo Guerrero 2022; 4th Runner-up at Miss Guerrero 2021
2024	In 2024, due to changes in the dates of the national pageant, the election of the state queens was postponed for one year.				
2023	Norma Lizeth Gochicoa Basurto	Acapulco	Top 10		Competed at Miss Guerrero 2018
2022	Andrea Díaz Farill	Acapulco	1st Runner-up	-	Miss Model of the World México 2018; Miss Model of the World Guerrero 2018
2021	No candidate was sent				
2020	In 2020, due to the contingency of COVID-19 there was a lag in the year of the state contest				
2019	No candidate was sent				
2018	Cristal Ivete Rodríguez Urquiza	Cutzamala	Top 20	-	Competed at La Flor más Bella del Campo 2017; La Flor más Bella de Guerrero 2017; Miss Belleza Turismo México 2016; Miss Belleza Turismo Guerrero 2016; Señorita Tierra Caliente 2015
2017	María Guadalupe Valero Catalán	Iguala	3rd Runner-up	-	2nd Runner-up at Nuestra Belleza Latina 2021; Top 16 at Miss Earth México 2016; Miss Earth Guerrero 2016; Reina de la Bandera 2014
Until 2016 the Title was Nuestra Belleza Guerrero
2016	No candidate was sent				
2015	Susana Rentería González (Resigned)	Acapulco	Did not Compete	-	1st Runner-up at Miss F1 México 2015; First Mexican-cuban born in Guerrero
2014	Estephany García Veléz (Resigned)	Acapulco	Did not Compete	-	-
2013	Barbara Mariel Pozos Morales	Acapulco	-	-	-
2012	Fátima Paloma Hernández Carpio	Coyuca de Benítez	-	-	1st Runner-up at Miss Guerrero 2021; Reina de los Clavadistas 2012; Reina de la Expo-Feria de la Palmera 2010
2011	No candidate was sent				
2010	Suslim Patrón Jiménez	Chilpancingo	-	-	1st Runner-up at Flor de Noche Buena 2009
2009	Ana Rosa Manrique Aguirre	Tlapehuala	-	-	-
2008	Natali Bastidas García	Acapulco	-	-	-
2007	No candidate was sent				
2006	Cinthia Valle Vidal	Acapulco	-	-	-
2005	No candidate was sent				
2004	Priscila Avellaneda Padilla	Acapulco	Top 10	-	-
2003	Lilian Cepeda Martínez	Iguala	-	-	-
2002	No candidate was sent				
2001	No candidate was sent				
2000	No candidate was sent				
1999	Alejandra López Duchesneau	Acapulco	-	-	-
1998	Paulina Crofton Nadal †	Acapulco	-	-	Second Mexican-lebanese born in Guerrero; Died on 1999
1997	Carla Coral López Solís	Chilpancingo	-	-	-
1996	Nancy Karina Bejar Bernal	Chilpancingo	-	-	First Mexican-lebanese born in Guerrero
1995	Karla Patricia González López	Acapulco	4th Runner-up	-	-
1994	Liliana Abaroa Caso	Acapulco	-	-	-

== See also ==
- Miss Guerrero
