= Mexicana Universal Campeche =

- Formation: 1994 (as Nuestra Belleza Campeche); 2017 (as Mexicana Universal Campeche)
- Type: Beauty Pageant
- Headquarters: Campeche
- Location: Mexico
- Local Coordinator: Pedro Peniche

Mexicana Universal Campeche (until 2016 called Nuestra Belleza Campeche) is a state-level contest in the state of Campeche, Mexico, which selects the state representative for the national contest Mexicana Universal (formerly called Nuestra Belleza México), thus aspiring to represent the country internationally on one of the platforms offered.

The state organization has achieved the following results since 1994:

- Winner: 1 (2001)
- Top 10: 1 (2015)
- Top 15/16: 1 (1997)
- Top 20: 2 (2004)
- Unplaced: 19 (1994, 1995, 1996, 1998, 1999, 2002, 2005, 2006, 2007, 2008, 2009, 2010, 2011, 2013, 2017, 2019, 2021, 2022)
- Absences: 6 (2000, 2003, 2012, 2014, 2018, 2023, 2025)

== National Queens ==
- Diana Juárez - Miss Costa Maya México 2003 (Designated)
- Tatiana Rodríguez - Nuestra Belleza Mundo México 2001
- Barbara Macossay - Miss Costa Maya México 1998 (Designated)

== Titleholders ==
The following are the names of the annual winners of Mexicana Universal Campeche, listed in ascending order, as well as their results during the national Mexicana Universal pageant. State queens who represented the country in a current or past franchise of the national organization are also highlighted in a specific color.

Current Franchises:

- Competed at Miss Grand International.
- Competed at Miss International.
- Competed at Miss Charm.
- Competed at Reina Hispanoamericana.
- Competed at Miss Orb International.
- Competed at Nuestra Latinoamericana Universal.

Former Franchises:

- Competed at Miss Universe.
- Competed at Miss World.
- Competed at Miss Continente Americano.
- Competed at Miss Costa Maya International.
- Competed at Miss Atlántico Internacional.
- Competed at Miss Verano Viña del Mar.
- Competed at Reina Internacional del Café.
- Competed at Reina Internacional de las Flores.
- Competed at Señorita Continente Americano.
- Competed at Nuestra Belleza Internacional.

| Year | Titleholder | Hometown | Placement | Special Award | Notes |
|---|---|---|---|---|---|
| 2025 | Ana Carolina Ortiz Aquino | Campeche | - | - | - |
| 2024 | In 2024, due to changes in the dates of the national pageant, the election of the state queens was postponed for this year. | | | | |
| 2023 | Gabriela Paola Gutiérrez Guerrero; Withdrew from the national competition due to the postponement of the national pageant. | Campeche | Did not Compete | - | Top 16 at Miss México 2018; Miss Campeche 2017; Reina del Carnaval de Campeche 2017; 1st Runner-up at Teen Universe México 2015; Teen Universe Campeche 2015 |
| 2022 | Alexia de Jesús Paredes Buenfil | Champotón | - | - | - |
| 2021 | Jessica Jayleen Terán Castilla | Ciudad del Carmen | - | - | Reina de los Juegos Florales Nacionales 2017 |
| 2020 | In 2020, due to the contingency of COVID-19 there was a lag in the year of the state contest | | | | |
| 2019 | Ivanna Díaz Vázquez | Ciudad del Carmen | - | - | Top 16 at Teen Universe México 2016; Teen Universe Campeche 2016 |
| 2018 | No candidate was sent | | | | |
| 2017 | María de Jesús Rodríguez Toledo | Escárcega | - | - | Competed at Mexicana Universal Quintana Roo 2017 |
Until 2016 the Title was Nuestra Belleza Campeche
| 2016 | No candidate was sent | | | | |
| 2015 | Ana Lilia Alpuche Tovar | Campeche | Top 10 | - | The Miss Globe México 2014; Miss Earth México-Air 2013; Miss Earth Campeche 2013 |
| 2014 | No candidate was sent | | | | |
| 2013 | Silvia Minerva García Cruz | Ciudad del Carmen | - | - | Princesa del Carnaval del Carmen 2010 |
| 2012 | No candidate was sent | | | | |
| 2011 | Karla Eugenia Buenfil Ayala | Campeche | - | - | - |
| 2010 | Michelle Arjona Hernández | Campeche | - | - | - |
| 2009 | Laura Gabriela Rodríguez Toraya | Escárcega | - | - | - |
| 2008 | Nazli Gantus Bernés | Campeche | - | - | - |
| 2007 | Rossina Isabel Saravia Lugo | Campeche | - | - | - |
| 2006 | Irlanda Ana Luisa Campos López | Campeche | - | - | - |
| 2005 | Sonia Carolina Tatua Castilla | Campeche | - | - | - |
| 2004 | María Beatriz Ortegón Baqueiro | Campeche | Top 20 | - | - |
| 2003 | No candidate was sent | | | | |
| 2002 | Diana Juárez Rodríguez de la Gala | Campeche | - | Best National Costume | Competed at Miss Costa Maya International 2003; Miss Costa Maya México 2003; Samantha Juárez's twin sister, Designada Campeche 2004 |
| 2001 | Tatiana Rodríguez Romero | Ciudad del Carmen | Nuestra Belleza Mundo México | - | Competed at Miss World 2001; María Romero's daughter, Señorita Campeche 1973 |
| 2000 | No candidate was sent | | | | |
| 1999 | Jocelyn Selem Trueba | Campeche | - | Best National Costume | - |
| 1998 | Kathia Patricia Villegas Heredia | Campeche | - | - | - |
| 1997 | Barbara Macossay Arteaga | Campeche | Top 16 | - | Competed at Miss Costa Maya International 1998; Miss Costa Maya México 1998; Tatiana Macossay's sister, Señorita Campeche 1995 |
| 1996 | Liliana Rendis Buenfil | Campeche | - | - | Reina del Carnaval de Campeche 1996 |
| 1995 | Eddy Esther Magaña Domínguez | Campeche | - | - | - |
| 1994 | Claudia Esperanza Santini Sosa | Campeche | - | - | - |

== Designated Contestants ==
Starting in 2000, states were allowed to have more than one candidate, as some states were not sending candidates for various reasons. The following contestants from Campeche were invited to compete in the national pageant alongside the reigning queen, and in some cases, they achieved even better results.

| Year | Titleholder | Hometown | Placement | Special Award | Notes |
|---|---|---|---|---|---|
| 2004 | Samantha Juárez Rodríguez de la Gala | Campeche | Top 20 | - | 1st Runner-up at Nuestra Belleza Campeche 2004; Diana Juárez's twin sister, Nuestra Belleza Campeche 2002 |

== See also ==
- Miss Campeche
