= Mexicana Universal Yucatán =

Beauty pageant

- Formation: 1994 (as Nuestra Belleza Yucatán); 2017 (as Mexicana Universal Yucatán)
- Type: Beauty Pageant
- Headquarters: Mérida
- Location: Mexico
- Local Coordinator: Laura Castro

Mexicana Universal Yucatán (until 2016 called Nuestra Belleza Yucatán) is a state-level contest in the state of Yucatán, Mexico, which selects the state representative for the national contest Mexicana Universal (formerly called Nuestra Belleza México), thus aspiring to represent the country internationally on one of the platforms offered.

The state organization has achieved the following results since 1994:

- Winner: 2 (2001, 2009, 2023)
- 2nd Runner-up: 1 (2018)
- 3rd Runner-up: 1 (2002)
- 4th Runner-up: 1 (2015)
- Top 10/11/12: 6 (1998, 2010, 2014, 2016, 2017, 2019)
- Top 15/16: 4 (1994, 1996, 2007, 2013)
- Top 20/21: 4 (2000, 2003, 2004, 2005)
- Unplaced: 9 (1995, 1997, 1999, 2006, 2008, 2011, 2012, 2021, 2022)

== National Queens ==
- Melissa Payró - Mexicana Hispanoamericana 2026
- Anabel Solis - Nuestra Belleza Mundo México 2009
- María José Rosado - Reina de las Flores México 2003
- Ericka Cruz - Nuestra Belleza México 2001
- Esther López - Miss Costa Maya México 2001

== Titleholders ==
The following are the names of the annual winners of Mexicana Universal Veracruz, listed in ascending order, as well as their results during the national Mexicana Universal pageant. State queens who represented the country in a current or past franchise of the national organization are also highlighted in a specific color.

Current Franchises:

- Competed at Miss Grand International.
- Competed at Miss International.
- Competed at Miss Charm.
- Competed at Reina Hispanoamericana.
- Competed at Miss Orb International.
- Competed at Nuestra Latinoamericana Universal.

Former Franchises:

- Competed at Miss Universe.
- Competed at Miss World.
- Competed at Miss Continente Americano.
- Competed at Miss Costa Maya International.
- Competed at Miss Atlántico Internacional.
- Competed at Miss Verano Viña del Mar.
- Competed at Reina Internacional del Café.
- Competed at Reina Internacional de las Flores.
- Competed at Señorita Continente Americano.
- Competed at Nuestra Belleza Internacional.

Year	Titleholder	Hometown	Placement	Special Award	Notes
2025	Andrea Gutiérrez Zamudio	Mérida	TBD		
2024	In 2024, due to changes in the dates of the national pageant, the election of the state queens was postponed for one year.				
2023	Melissa Payró de la O	Mérida	Mexicana Hispanoamericana	-	2nd Runner-up at Reina Hispanoamericana 2026; 15 at Miss Glam World 2019; Miss Glam World México 2019; Miss Globe Yucatán 2019; 2nd Runner-up at Miss Yucatán 2017; Was born in Tabasco
2022	Scandy Michelle Patrón Palma	Mérida	-	-	Miss Eco México 2019; Miss Earth Quintana Roo 2019; 1st Runner-up at Miss Earth Yucatán 2016; Competed at Teen Universe México 2014; Teen Universe Yucatán 2014
2021	Aryan Trava Cavazos	Mérida	-	-	2nd Runner-up at Teen Universe 2017; Teen Universe México 2017; Teen Universe Yucatán 2017
2020	In 2020, due to the contingency of COVID-19 there was a lag in the year of the state contest				
2019	Natalia Elizarrarás Flores	Mérida	Top 10	-	-
2018	María Eugenia Nava del Río	Mérida	2nd Runner-up	-	Reina de la Feria Ixmatkuil 2019
2017	Anapaola de Anda Aviña	Mérida	Top 10	-	-
Until 2016 the Title was Nuestra Belleza Yucatán
2016	Rossana Kin Castillo	Mérida	Top 10	-	-
2015	Yaris Cháidez Zumaya	Mérida	4th Runner-up	Miss Talent; Personality Fraiche	Reina del Carnaval de Mérida 2017; 1st Runner-up at Nuestra Belleza Yucatán 2014
2014	Renata Rábago Domínguez	Mérida	Top 10	-	Miss F1 México 2015
2013	Maritza Heredia Torre	Mérida	Top 15	Miss Sports	Reina del Carnaval de Mérida 2016; Competed at Miss F1 México 2015
2012	Marsha Mariana Ramírez Martínez	Mérida	-	-	Competed at Miss F1 México 2015; Reina del Carnaval de Mérida 2015; Top 20 at Miss Grand International 2014; Miss Grand México 2014; Miss Grand Yucatán 2014; Was born in Jalisco
2011	Jessica Margarita Duarte Hermida	Mérida	-	-	Competed in Miss F1 México 2015
2010	María Fernanda López Cuéllar	Mérida	Top 10	The Queens' Choice	-
2009	Anabel Solís Sosa	Mérida	Nuestra Belleza Mundo México	Miss Sensodyne Whitening	Competed at Miss World 2010
2008	María Esther Magadán Solís	Progreso	-	-	-
2007	Valentina Cervera Ávila	Mérida	Top 15	Best National Costume; Miss Skin Palmolive Optims	Miss Costa Maya International 2011; Miss Costa Maya México 2011; World Sea Queen 2004; Competed at Miss Maja Mundial 2004; Competed at Miss Ámbar Mundial 2004; Competed at Miss Intercontinental 2004; Competed at Miss Globe 2004; Competed at Miss Earth 2004; Miss Latina México 2003; Miss Latina Yucatán 2004
2006	Isis Amor Barrera Correa	Mérida	-	-	Competed at Miss Costa Maya International 2007; Miss Costa Maya México 2007; Competed at Maja Mundial 2006
2005	Mariana Ancona García	Mérida	Top 20	Academic Award	Ana María García's daughter, Señorita Turismo México 1980
2004	María Esther Molina Fuente	Mérida	Top 20	Best National Costume	-
2003	Marisol Rojas Avila	Mérida	Top 20	-	Miss Costa Maya International 2004; Miss Costa Maya México 2004
2002	María José Rosado Solís	Mérida	3rd Runner-up	-	1st Runner-up at Miss Costa Maya International 2006; Miss Costa Maya México 2006; Competed at Reina Internacional de las Flores 2003; Reinas de las Flores México 2003
2001	Ericka Yadira Cruz Escalante	Mérida	Nuestra Belleza México	Best National Costume	Reina del Carnaval de Mérida 2010; Competed at Miss Universe 2002; 1st Runner-up at Nuestra Belleza Mundo México 2001; First afrodescent born in Yucatán
2000	Evelyn Esther López Pacheco	Mérida	Top 20	-	Competed at Miss Costa Maya International 2001; Miss Costa Maya México 2001; Top 20 at Nuestra Belleza Mundo México 2000
1999	Katty Mirlé Risueño Coello	Mérida	-	-	-
1998	María Teresa Campos Ríos	Mérida	Top 11	-	-
1997	Amelia Sierra Calderón	Mérida	-	-	-
1996	Lyndia Quiroz Zavala	Mérida	Top 16	-	-
1995	Mary Tony Gasque López	Mérida	-	-	-
1994	Angélica Juanita Schober Laferl	Mérida	Top 16	-	First Mexican-German representing Yucatán; Was born in Mexico City

== Designated Contestants ==
Starting in 2000, states were allowed to have more than one candidate, as some states were not sending candidates for various reasons. The following contestants from Yucatán were invited to compete in the national pageant alongside the reigning queen, and in some cases, they achieved even better results.

Year	Titleholder	Hometown	Placement	Special Award	Notes
2000	Selena del Pilar Monsreal Vera	Mérida	-	-	-

== See also ==
- Miss Yucatán
