= Mexicana Universal Querétaro =

- Formation: 1994 (as Nuestra Belleza Querétaro); 2017 (as Mexicana Universal Querétaro)
- Type: Beauty Pageant
- Headquarters: Querétaro
- Location: Mexico
- Local Coordinator: Alejandra González

Mexicana Universal Querétaro (until 2016 called Nuestra Belleza Querétaro) is a state-level contest in the state of Querétaro, Mexico, which selects the state representative for the national contest Mexicana Universal (formerly called Nuestra Belleza México), thus aspiring to represent the country internationally on one of the platforms offered.

The state organization has achieved the following results since 1994:

- 4th Runner-up: 1 (1996)
- Top 10/11/12: 4 (2002, 2008, 2015, 2016)
- Top 15/16: 7 (1994, 1995, 2009, 2013, 2016, 2017, 2022)
- Top 20/21: 2 (2000, 2018)
- Unplaced: 17 (1997, 1998, 1999, 2001, 2003, 2005, 2006, 2007, 2009, 2010, 2011, 2012, 2014, 2018, 2019, 2023, 2025)
- Absences: 2 (2004, 2021)

== Titleholders ==
The following are the names of the annual winners of Mexicana Universal Querétaro, listed in ascending order, as well as their results during the national Mexicana Universal pageant. State queens who represented the country in a current or past franchise of the national organization are also highlighted in a specific color.

Current Franchises:

- Competed at Miss Grand International.
- Competed at Miss International.
- Competed at Miss Charm.
- Competed at Reina Hispanoamericana.
- Competed at Miss Orb International.
- Competed at Nuestra Latinoamericana Universal.

Former Franchises:

- Competed at Miss Universe.
- Competed at Miss World.
- Competed at Miss Continente Americano.
- Competed at Miss Costa Maya International.
- Competed at Miss Atlántico Internacional.
- Competed at Miss Verano Viña del Mar.
- Competed at Reina Internacional del Café.
- Competed at Reina Internacional de las Flores.
- Competed at Señorita Continente Americano.
- Competed at Nuestra Belleza Internacional.

| Year | Titleholder | Hometown | Placement | Special Award | Notes |
|---|---|---|---|---|---|
| 2026 | Ángela Moya Muñoz | Querétaro | TBD | | |
| 2025 | Mariana Soto González | Querétaro | - | Best National Costume | Was born and raised in Guanajuato |
| 2024 | In 2024, due to changes in the dates of the national pageant, the election of the state queens was postponed for one year. | | | | |
| 2023 | Lorena González Ortega; Resigned from her state title due to the postponement of the national pageant. | Querétaro | Did not Compete | - | Top 10 at Miss Tourism World Intercontinental 2019; Miss Tourism World México 2018; Miss Earth México-Air 2018; Miss Earth Querétaro 2018; Competed at Teen Universe México 2016; Teen Universe Querétaro 2016 |
| 2023 | Elisa Flores Anaya (Assumed) | Querétaro | - | - | Competed at Mexicana Universal Querétaro 2022 |
| 2022 | Esmeralda Guadalupe Meza Justiniano | Querétaro | Top 16 | - | Will compete at Miss Cosmo 2026; Top 11 at Miss México 2025; Miss Tabasco 2025; Top 16 at Miss Universe México 2024; Miss Universe Querétaro 2024 |
| 2021 | No candidate was sent | | | | |
| 2020 | In 2020, due to the contingency of COVID-19 there was a lag in the year of the state contest | | | | |
| 2019 | Alejandra Sánchez Díaz de León | Querétaro | - | - | Competed at Mexicana Universal Querétaro 2018 |
| 2018 | Karla Sofía Duque Jáuregui | Querétaro | - | - | Competed at Miss Earth Querétaro 2018; Miss Earth Cadereyta 2019; 1st Runner-up at Mexicana Universal Querétaro 2017 |
| 2017 | María José Hernández Ledesma | Cadereyta de Montes | Top 16 | - | - |
Until 2016 the Title was Nuestra Belleza Querétaro
| 2016 | Ana Luisa Ganuza Pérez | Querétaro | Top 15 | - | - |
| 2015 | Michelle León López | Querétaro | Top 10 | - | - |
| 2014 | Karen Guadalupe Saldaña Sandoval | Querétaro | - | - | - |
| 2013 | Carla Korina Salinas Orban | Querétaro | Top 15 | Academic Award | Competed at Miss F1 México 2015; Top 5 at Nuestra Belleza Mundo México 2013 |
| 2012 | Ana Elisa García Hugues | Querétaro | - | - | Competed at Miss F1 México 2015 |
| 2011 | Adriana Martínez de Anda | Querétaro | - | - | - |
| 2010 | Natasha Kaufmann Gómez (Resigned) | Querétaro | Did not Compete | - | - |
| 2010 | María Perusquía Flores (Assumed) | Querétaro | - | - | - |
| 2009 | Alejandra Cabral Cabrera | Querétaro | - | - | - |
| 2008 | Ana Catherina Castrejón y Pérez | Querétaro | Top 10 | Academic Award; Best National Costume | Was born in Hidalgo |
| 2007 | Adriana Monroy Mendoza | Querétaro | - | - | - |
| 2006 | María Fernanda Quinzaños Herrera | Querétaro | - | - | - |
| 2005 | Diana Pereyra San Román | Querétaro | - | - | - |
| 2004 | No candidate was sent | | | | |
| 2003 | Ivonne Obando González | Querétaro | - | - | - |
| 2002 | Joan Michelle Glenn Garza | Querétaro | Top 12 | - | - |
| 2001 | Paulina Vázquez Miranda | Querétaro | - | - | - |
| 2000 | María Antonieta Fierro Aguilera | Querétaro | Top 20 | - | Top 20 at Nuestra Belleza Mundo México 2000 |
| 1999 | Ericka Thomas Minutti | Querétaro | - | - | - |
| 1998 | Myriam Adaliz Domínguez Yemez | Querétaro | - | - | - |
| 1997 | Laura Barbeito Chávez | Querétaro | - | - | - |
| 1996 | Hortencia Iveth García Espinoza | Querétaro | 4th Runner-up | Best Smile | 4th Runner-up at Nuestra Belleza Mundo México 1996 |
| 1995 | Rocío Cytlalhi Galindo Gómez | Querétaro | Top 16 | - | - |
| 1994 | Andrea Guevara Roslyn Rowland | Querétaro | Top 16 | - | Was born in Mexico City |

== Designated Contestants ==
Starting in 2000, states were allowed to have more than one candidate, as some states were not sending candidates for various reasons. The following contestants from Querétaro were invited to compete in the national pageant alongside the reigning queen, and in some cases, they achieved even better results.

| Year | Titleholder | Hometown | Placement | Special Award | Notes |
|---|---|---|---|---|---|
| 2018 | Carolina Martínez Orozco | Querétaro | Top 20 | - | 2nd Runner-up at Mexicana Universal Querétaro 2018 |
| 2016 | Laila Kuri Baños | Querétaro | Top 10 | Miss Sports | 1st Runner-up at Nuestra Belleza Querétaro 2016 |
| 2009 | Paulina Cabrera Balderas | Querétaro | Top 15 | Miss Sports | 1st Runner-up at Nuestra Belleza Querétaro 2009 |
| 2003 | Grisel Franco Rivera | Querétaro | - | - | 1st Runner-up at Nuestra Belleza Querétaro 2003 |

== See also ==
- Miss Querétaro
