= Mexicana Universal Hidalgo =

- Formation: 1994
- Type: Beauty Pageant
- Headquarters: Pachuca
- Location: Mexico
- Local Coordinator: Shantal Montaño

Mexicana Universal Hidalgo (until 2016 called Nuestra Belleza Hidalgo) is a state-level contest in the state of Hidalgo, Mexico, which selects the state representative for the national contest Mexicana Universal (formerly called Nuestra Belleza México), thus aspiring to represent the country internationally on one of the platforms offered.

The state organization has achieved the following results since 1994:

- Winner: 1 (2023)
- Top 15/16: 2 (1994, 2021)
- Unplaced: 27 (1995, 1996, 1997, 1998, 1999, 2000, 2001, 2002, 2003, 2004, 2005, 2006, 2007, 2008, 2009, 2010, 2011, 2012, 2013, 2014, 2015, 2016, 2017, 2018, 2019, 2022, 2025)
- Absences: 7 (2003, 2004, 2005, 2006, 2007, 2009, 2010)

== National Queens ==
- Montserrat Villalva - Mexicana Grand Internacional 2025
- Lili Rosales - Reina Hispanoamericana México 2011 (Designated)

== Titleholders ==
The following are the names of the annual winners of Mexicana Universal Hidalgo, listed in ascending order, as well as their results during the national Mexicana Universal pageant. State queens who represented the country in a current or past franchise of the national organization are also highlighted in a specific color.

Current Franchises:

- Competed at Miss Grand International.
- Competed at Miss International.
- Competed at Miss Charm.
- Competed at Reina Hispanoamericana.
- Competed at Miss Orb International.
- Competed at Nuestra Latinoamericana Universal.

Former Franchises:

- Competed at Miss Universe.
- Competed at Miss World.
- Competed at Miss Continente Americano.
- Competed at Miss Costa Maya International.
- Competed at Miss Atlántico Internacional.
- Competed at Miss Verano Viña del Mar.
- Competed at Reina Internacional del Café.
- Competed at Reina Internacional de las Flores.
- Competed at Señorita Continente Americano.
- Competed at Nuestra Belleza Internacional.

Year	Titleholder	Hometown	Placement	Special Award	Notes
2025	Grecia Guadalupe Zambrano Orozco	Tasquillo	-	-	Competed at Miss Hidalgo 2018
2024	In 2024, due to changes in the dates of the national pageant, the election of the state queens was postponed for one year.				
2023	Montserrat Magaly Villalva Castillo	Mixquiahuala	Mexicana Grand Internacional	Ambassador Dabalash	5th Runner-up at Miss Grand International 2025; Miss Teen Mundial México 2017; Miss Teen Mundial Hidalgo 2017
2022	Daniela Mayte Oviedo Torres	Ixmiquilpan	-	-	-
2021	Katya Vanessa Cornejo Hernández	Ixmiquilpan	Top 16	-	-
2020	In 2020, due to the contingency of COVID-19 there was a lag in the year of the state contest				
2019	Griselda Garzón Quiroz	Pachuca	-	-	-
2018	Marili Vázquez Olguín	Ixmiquilpan	-	-	-
2017	Jenyfer Benítez Peñafiel (Resigned)	Pachuca	Did not Compete	-	Miss Teenager Intercontinental 2016; Miss Teen Mundo México 2016; Miss Teen Hidalgo 2016
2017	Constanza Kanahuati Arellano (Assumed)	Pachuca	-	-	-
Until 2016 the Title was 'Nuestra Belleza Hidalgo
2016	Claudia Michelle Rodríguez Berlanga	Pachuca	-	-	Miss Earth Veracruz-Air 2015; Competed at Nuestra Belleza Veracruz 2014
2015	Nicktell Rodríguez Apodaca	Mineral de la Reforma	-	-	Competed at Nuestra Belleza Universitaria 2011
2014	Orianna Barrera Alarcón	Pachuca	-	-	-
2013	Shantal Montaño Ricaño	Tulancingo	-	-	Competed at Miss F1 México 2015; Competed at Miss Earth México 2008; Miss Earth Hidalgo 2008; Señorita UAEH 2008
2012	María de los Ángeles Cuevas de Anda	Tulancingo	-	-	-
2011	Martha Lili Marlene Rosales López	Pachuca	-	-	Competed at Reina Hispanoamericana 2011; Reina Hispanoamericana México 2011; Was born in Jalisco
2010	No candidate was sent				
2009	No candidate was sent				
2008	Karla Solano Armenta	Tulancingo	-	-	Was born in Sinaloa
2007	No candidate was sent				
2006	No candidate was sent				
2005	No candidate was sent				
2004	No candidate was sent				
2003	No candidate was sent				
2002	Verónica Gabriela Reyes Cerda	Pachuca	-	-	-
2001	Sara Guadalupe García Amador	Pachuca	-	-	-
2000	Marisol Mandujano Cerrilla	Huejutla	-	-	-
1999	Monserrat Jaime Flores	Tulancingo	-	-	-
1998	Laura Gabriela Pérez Cuevas	Tulancingo	-	-	-
1997	Gabriela García Muro	Tulancingo	-	-	-
1996	Isela Erendira Ruíz Castañeda	Pachuca	-	-	-
1995	Lizbeth Hernández Orta	Pachuca	-	-	Embajadora de Conciencia Turística 1995
1994	Viridiana Cortés Domínguez	Pachuca	Top 16	-	-

== See also ==
- Miss Hidalgo
