= Mexicana Universal Nayarit =

- Formation: 1994 (as Nuestra Belleza Nayarit); 2017 (as Mexicana Universal Nayarit)
- Type: Beauty pageant
- Headquarters: Tepic
- Location: Mexico
- Local coordinator: Daniela Ortiz

Mexicana Universal Nayarit (until 2016 called Nuestra Belleza Nayarit) is a state-level contest in the state of Nayarit, Mexico, which selects the state representative for the national contest Mexicana Universal (formerly called Nuestra Belleza México), thus aspiring to represent the country internationally on one of the platforms offered.

The state organization has achieved the following results since 1994:

- Winner: 4 (2018, 2021, 2023, 2025)
- 1st Runner-up: 1 (2018)
- 2nd Runner-up: 2 (1995, 2015)
- 3rd Runner-up: 1 (2022)
- Top 10/11/12: 2 (1998, 2006)
- Top 15/16: 4 (1996, 1997, 2012, 2016)
- Top 20/21: 1 (2004)
- Unplaced: 16 (1994, 1999, 2000, 2001, 2002, 2003, 2005, 2007, 2008, 2009, 2010, 2011, 2013, 2014, 2017, 2019)
- Absences: 1 (2000)

== National Queens ==
- Jashia Alegría - Mexicana Hispanoamericana 2026
- Francia Cortés - Miss Grand All Stars México 2026 (Designated)
- Francia Cortés - Mexicana Charm 2025
- Verónica Gamboa - Nuestra Latinoamericana Universal México 2022
- Yuridia Durán - Mexicana Internacional 2020
- Geraldine Ponce - Nuestra Belleza Internacional México 2016 (Designated)
- Tania Vázquez - Miss Costa Maya México 1997 (Designated)

== Titleholders ==
The following are the names of the annual winners of Mexicana Universal Nayarit, listed in ascending order, as well as their results during the national Mexicana Universal pageant. State queens who represented the country in a current or past franchise of the national organization are also highlighted in a specific color.

Current Franchises:

- Competed at Miss Grand International.
- Competed at Miss International.
- Competed at Miss Charm.
- Competed at Reina Hispanoamericana.
- Competed at Miss Orb International.
- Competed at Nuestra Latinoamericana Universal.

Former Franchises:

- Competed at Miss Universe.
- Competed at Miss World.
- Competed at Miss Continente Americano.
- Competed at Miss Costa Maya International.
- Competed at Miss Atlántico Internacional.
- Competed at Miss Verano Viña del Mar.
- Competed at Reina Internacional del Café.
- Competed at Reina Internacional de las Flores.
- Competed at Señorita Continente Americano.
- Competed at Nuestra Belleza Internacional.

Year	Titleholder	Hometown	Placement	Special Award	Notes
2025	Jashia del Carmen Alegría Sánchez	Acaponeta	Mexicana Hispanoamericana		Will compete at Reina Hispanoamericana 2027; Top 10 at Teen Universe 2024; Teen Universe México 2023; Teen Universe Nayarit 2022
2024	In 2024, due to changes in the dates of the national pageant, the election of the state queens was postponed for this year.				
2023	Alondra Paulette Azcona Serrano (Resigned)	Tepic	Did not Compete	-	2nd Runner-up at Señorita Tepic 2023; First married woman and mother from Nayarit
2023	Francia Monserrat Cortés Sandoval (Assumed)	Bahía de Banderas	Mexicana Charm	-	Top 18 at MGI All Stars 2026; Miss Grand All Stars México 2026; Top 5 at Miss Charm 2025; 1st Runner-up at Mexicana Universal Nayarit 2023
2022	Cora Fernanda Mejía Ramírez	Xalisco	3rd Runner-up	-	1st Runner-up at Reina de la Feria de Nayarit 2020; Nuestra Reina Xalisco 2019
2021	Ana Verónica Gamboa Hernández	La Yesca	NLU México	-	Reina de la Feria de Nayarit 2020
2020	In 2020, due to the contingency of COVID-19 there was a lag in the year of the state contest				
2019	Ana Victoria Leija Navidad	Tepic	-	-	-
2018	Yuridia del Carmen Durán Peña	Ahuacatlán	Mexicana Internacional	Miss Photogenic	Competed at Miss International 2022; Mexicana Charm 2020; Reina de la Feria de Nayarit 2018; Nuestra Belleza Ahuacatlán 2016
2017	Hilda Viridiana Zamora Mejía	Tuxpan	-	-	-
Until 2016 the Title was Nuestra Belleza Nayarit
2016	Estefanía Carillo Inda (Resigned)	Compostela	Did not Compete	-	3rd Runner-up at Mrs Globe 2019; Mrs Globe México 2019
2016	Jocelyn Preciado Becerra (Assumed)	Rosamorada	Top 15	Miss Digital	1st Runner-up at Nuestra Belleza Nayarit 2016
2015	María Geraldine Ponce Méndez	Xalisco	2nd Runner-up	Miss Digital; Steps to Fame	Top 15 at Miss International 2016; Nuestra Belleza Internacional México 2016; 1st Runner-up at Nuestra Belleza Nayarit 2013; Reina de la Feria del Elote Xalisco 2013
2014	Xitlali Anaid López Hernández	San Blas	-	-	Competed at Miss F1 México 2015; 1st Runner-up at Nuestra Belleza Nayarit 2011
2013	Jessica Jazmín Orozco Huitrón	Tepic	-	-	-
2012	Lilia Jasibi Suma Cueva	Bahía de Banderas	Top 15	-	Was born in Jalisco
2011	Linda Rubí Ugarte Osuna	Tepic	-	-	Competed at Miss F1 México 2015
2010	Ana Priscila Zarate Cortéz	Tepic	-	-	Top 8 at Miss Earth México 2011; Miss Earth Nayarit 2011
2009	Viridiana Torrijos Valencia	Tepic	-	-	-
2008	Araceli Félix Partida	Tepic	-	-	-
2007	Ana Karen Romero Ponce	Tepic	-	-	Top 20 at Mexico's Next Top Model 2009; Señorita Universidad 2005
2006	Carolina González Serrato	San Blas	Top 10	-	-
2005	Daniela Ortíz Palacios	Tepic	-	-	-
2004	Paulina Pérez Parra	Tepic	Top 20	-	-
2003	Alejandra del Río López	Tepic	-	-	-
2002	Estrella Guadalupe Morales Guzmán	Compostela	-	-	-
2001	Claudia Isabel Fernández Medina	Tepic	-	-	-
2000	No candidate was sent				
1999	Bertha Guadalupe Tirado Espinoza	Tepic	-	-	-
1998	Claudia Liliana González Ramos	Tepic	Top 10	-	-
1997	Corinna Torres Cañas	Tepic	Top 16	-	4th Runner-up at Nuestra Belleza Mundo México 1997
1996	Tania Elizabeth Vázquez Pérez	Acaponeta	Top 16	-	Competed at Miss Costa Maya International 1997; Miss Costa Maya México 1997
1995	María Consuelo Rodríguez Tarabay	Tepic	2nd Runner-up	-	First Mexican-lebanese born in Nayarit
1994	Marcela Guadalupe Aragón González	Tepic	-	-	-

== Designated Contestants ==
Starting in 2000, states were allowed to have more than one candidate, as some states were not sending candidates for various reasons. The following contestants from Aguascalientes were invited to compete in the national pageant alongside the reigning queen, and in some cases, they achieved even better results.

Year	Titleholder	Hometown	Placement	Special Award	Notes
2018	Luz Alejandra Ávila Varela	Tepic	1st Runner-up	-	1st Runner-up at Mexicana Universal Nayarit 2018

== See also ==
- Miss Nayarit
