= Nuestra Belleza Nayarit 2011 =

- Date: July 8, 2011
- Presenters: Consuelo Rodríguez, Miguel Zapien
- Entertainment: Kiakoy
- Venue: Disco Palazzo, Tepic, Nayarit
- Broadcaster: Televisa
- Entrants: 8
- Placements: 4
- Winner: Linda Ugarte; Tepic

Nuestra Belleza Nayarit 2011, was held at the Disco Palazzo of Tepic, Nayarit on July 8, 2011. At the conclusion of the final night of competition Linda Ugarte from Tepic was crowned the winner. Ugarte was crowned by outgoing Nuestra Belleza Nayarit titleholder Priscila Zarate. Eight contestants competed for the title.

== Results ==
=== Placements ===
Final results	Contestant
Nuestra Belleza Nayarit 2011	Linda Ugarte
Suplente / 1st Runner-up	Xitlallí López
2nd Runner-up	Karem Gradilla
3rd Runner-up	Rocío López

== Judges ==
- Patricia Brogeras - Regional Coordinator of Nuestra Belleza México
- Rocío Mondragón - DIF Nayarit Director
- Richard Zarkim - Rivera Nayarit Brand Manager
- Noé Moreno - Revista Rostros Director
- Estrella Morales - Nuestra Belleza Nayarit 2002

== Background Music ==
- Kakoy

== Contestants ==
Hometown	Contestant	Age	Height
Tepic	Ana Karen Álzate Corona	20	1.69
Tepic	Anai Beltrán González	22	1.73
Tepic	Carolina Sánchez Vázquez	19	1.73
Tepic	Karen Vianey Gradilla Rodríguez	19	1.70
Tepic	Linda Rubí Ugarte Osuna	19	1.70
Tepic	Merari Lizeth Herrera Rodelo	20	1.80
Tepic	Roció López Fregoso	20	1.70
Tepic	Xitlally Anaid López Hernández	19	1.73
