= Mexicana Universal USA =

- Formation: 2021
- Type: Beauty pageant
- Headquarters: Houston
- Location: United States
- National coordinator: Paulina Lua

Mexicana Universal USA is a national-level contest in the United States, which selects the national representative for the national contest Mexicana Universal (formerly called Nuestra Belleza México), thus aspiring to represent the country internationally on one of the platforms offered.

The national organization has achieved the following results since 2021:

- 5th Runner-up: 1 (2022)
- Top 15/16: 1 (2021)
- Unplaced: 1 (2025)
- Absences: 1 (2023)

== Titleholders ==
The following are the names of the annual winners of Mexicana Universal USA, listed in ascending order, as well as their results during the national Mexicana Universal pageant. State queens who represented the country in a current or past franchise of the national organization are also highlighted in a specific color.

Current Franchises:

- Competed at Miss Grand International.
- Competed at Miss International.
- Competed at Miss Charm.
- Competed at Reina Hispanoamericana.
- Competed at Miss Orb International.
- Competed at Nuestra Latinoamericana Universal.

Year	Titleholder	Hometown	Placement	Special Award	Notes
2025	Layla Herrera Saucedo	Colorado	-	-	Competed at Mexicana Universal USA 2021; Mexicana Universal Colorado 2021; Was born in Jalisco
2024	In 2024, due to changes in the dates of the national pageant, the election of the state queens was postponed for one year.				
2023	Bibyana Márquez (Resigned)	Texas	Did not Compete	-	Mexicana Universal San Antonio 2023; Miss Teen Universe 2020; Miss Teen Universe USA 2019
2023	Sayra Alondra García Ramos; Withdrew from the national competition due to the postponement of the national pageant.	California	Did not Compete	-	1st Runner-up at Mexicana Universal USA 2023; Mexicana Universal Sacramento 2023; With ancestry in Michoacán
2022	Melody Deyanira Murguía Reyes	Arizona	5th Runner-up	-	Top 10 at Miss Cosmo 2024; Miss México Cosmo 2024; Miss México USA 2024; Was born in Sonora
2021	Pamela Lee Urbina	Nueva York	Top 16	-	World's Top Model 2019; World's Top Model México 2019; 4th Runner-up at Miss Global 2018; Miss Global USA 2018; Miss Texas Global 2018; Miss San Antonio Global 2018; With ancestry in Nayarit and Nuevo León

== Contestants selected for international competitions ==
Mexicana Universal USA and its sister pageant Nuestra Latinoamericana Universal USA opened the possibility of participating in international pageants representing the Hispanic community in the United States.

=== Reina Hispanoamericana ===
Year	Titleholder	Hometown	Placement	Special Award	Notes
2025	Ana Paula Morales	Texas	-	-	Reina Hispanoamericana USA 2024; 2nd Runner-up at Mexicana Universal USA 2023; Mexicana Universal Miami 2023; With ancestry in Jalisco
2023	Estephania de la Cruz	Nueva York	-	-	Reina Hispanoamericana USA 2023; Competed at Nuestra Latinoamericana Universal USA 2022; Nuestra Latinoamericana Universal Nueva York 2021; With ancestry in Dominican Republic
2022	Silvia Marie Colón	Florida	-	-	Reina Hispanoamericana USA 2022; Nuestra Latinoamericana Universal USA 2022; Nuestra Latinoamericana Universal Florida 2021; With ancestry in Puerto Rico

=== Miss ORB International ===
Year	Titleholder	Hometown	Placement	Special Award	Notes
2024	Azalia Arredondo	Texas	Top 10	-	Top 10 at Miss Universe Latina 2025; Miss ORB Latina USA 2024; 3rd Runner-up at Mexicana Universal USA 2023; Mexicana Universal Houston 2023; Was born in the Mexico City

== See also ==
- Miss México USA
