= Miss Earth México 2013 =

12th edition of Miss Earth México beauty pageant

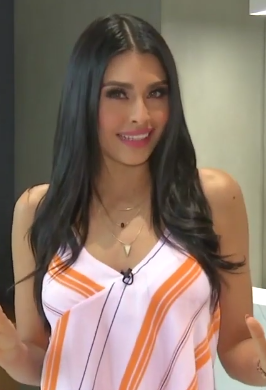
- Kristal Silva
- Date: October 26, 2013
- Presenters: Ana Yareth Aldrete; Jerry
- Entertainment: Hotel Barceló Animation Team
- Venue: Barcelo Montelimar, Huatulco, Oaxaca
- Entrants: 32
- Placements: 16
- Winner: Kristal Silva; Tamaulipas

The 12th annual Miss Earth México pageant was held at Hotel Barceló of Huatulco, Oaxaca on October 26, 2013. Thirty-two contestants of the Mexican Republic competed for the national title, which was won by Kristal Silva from Tamaulipas who later competed in Miss Earth 2013 in Philippines where she was a Finalist in the Top 8. Silva was crowned by outgoing Miss Earth México titleholder Paola Aguilar. She is the second Tamaulipeca to win this title.

== Results ==
=== Placements ===
Final results	Contestant
Miss Earth México 2013	Tamaulipas - Yuselmi Kristal Silva Dávila
Miss Air	Campeche – Ana Lilia Alpuche
Miss Water	Baja California Sur – Estefanía Olachea
Miss Fire	Chiapas – Tania Lara Cigarroa
Top 8	
Top 16	

=== Special awards ===
Award	Contestant
Miss Figure	Campeche – Ana Lilia Alpuche
Miss Photogenic	Campeche – Ana Lilia Alpuche
Best Evening Gown	Campeche – Ana Lilia Alpuche
Miss Friendship	Nuevo León – Ilse Acosta Vargas
Miss Internet	Veracruz – Erendira Cazarín
Ecological Project	Baja California Sur - Estefanía Olachea
Best National Costume	Nayarit – Grecia Ochoa
Stylized Costume	Oaxaca – Daniela Zendejas

== Partial Contestants ==
State	Contestant	Age	Height
Aguascalientes			
Baja California	Lidia Isabel Quiroz Dorantes	21	1.71
Baja California Sur	Estefanía Elizabeth Olachea Bermúdez		
Campeche	Ana Lilia Alpuche Tovar	21	1.70
Chiapas	Tania Lara Cigarroa	23	1.74
Chihuahua	Ana Corral		
Coahuila	Haydée Otero	24	
Colima	Montserrat Solorio	21	1.80
(Mexico City) Distrito Federal	Cynthia Castañeda		
Durango	Daniela Castillo	20	1.69
(State of Mexico) Estado de México	Atenea Torrico		
Guanajuato	Dévora Hernández		
Guerrero	Itzel Atenas Medrano Alarcón	19	1.70
Hidalgo	Estrella González		
Jalisco			
Michoacán			
Morelos			
Nayarit			
Nuevo León	Ilse Acosta Vargas	18	1.82
Oaxaca			
Puebla			
Querétaro			
Quintana Roo			
San Luis Potosí			
Sinaloa			
Sonora			
Tabasco			
Tamaulipas	Kristal Silva	21	1.77
Tlaxcala			
Veracruz			
Yucatán			
Zacatecas			
