= Miss México USA =

National-level beauty pageant

- Formation: 2024
- Type: Beauty pageant
- Headquarters: Phoenix
- Location: United States
- National coordinator: Francisco Adame

Miss México USA is a national-level contest in the United States of America, which selects the national representative for the national contest Miss México, thus aspiring to represent the country internationally on one of the platforms offered.

The national organization has achieved the following results since 2021:

- 5th Runner-up: 1 (2022)
- Top 15/16: 1 (2021)
- Absences: 1 (2023)

== Titleholders ==
The following are the names of the annual winners of Miss México USA, listed in ascending order, as well as their results during the national Miss México pageant. State queens who represented the country in a current or past franchise of the national organization are also highlighted in a specific color.

Current Franchises:

- Competed at Miss World.
- Competed at Miss Supranational.
- Competed at Miss Cosmo.
- Competed at Miss Elite.
- Competed at Top Model of the World.
- Competed at Reina Internacional del Café.
- Competed at Reina Mundial del Banano.
- Competed at Miss Continentes Unidos.
- Competed at Miss Global City.

Former Franchises:

- Competed at Miss Grand International.
- Competed at Miss Costa Maya International.

Year	Titleholder	Hometown	Placement	Special Award	Notes
2026	Thalía Calderón García Peña	Arizona	TBD		Competed at Nuestra Latinoamericana Universal USA 2022; Competed at Mexicana Universal USA 2022; Nuestra Latinoamericana Universal Arizona 2021; Mexicana Universal Northern Arizona 2021; Top 10 at Miss Teen Grand Universo 2021; Teen United States 2020; Competed at Teen Universe USA 2019; Teen Universe Arizona 2019; With ancestry in Chihuahua
2025	Amy Bibiana de la Torre (Resigned)	Illinois	Did not Compete	-	-
2025	Rocío Sánchez del Río (Assumed).	Texas	Did not Compete	-	Miss Charm Americas 2026; 1st Runner-up at Miss México USA 2025; Miss South Texas 2024; Was born in Jalisco
2024	Melody Deyanira Murguía Reyes	Arizona	Miss México Cosmo	English Challenge	Top 10 at Miss Cosmo 2024; 5th Runner-up at Mexicana Universal 2023; Mexicana Universal USA 2022; Mexicana Universal Arizona 2022; Was born in Sonora

== See also ==
- Mexicana Universal USA
