= Miss Querétaro =

Beauty pageant in Querétaro, Mexico

- Formation: 2016
- Type: Beauty pageant
- Headquarters: Querétaro City
- Location: Mexico
- Local Coordinator: Elizabeth Barcenas

Miss Querétaro is a state-level contest in the state of Querétaro, Mexico, which selects the state representative for the national contest Miss México, thus aspiring to represent the country internationally on one of the platforms offered.

The state organization has achieved the following results since 2016:

- Winner: 1 (2021)
- Top 10/11: 2 (2016, 2018)
- Top 16: 1 (2023)
- Unplaced: 3 (2017, 2019, 2025)

== National Queens ==
- Alejandra Correa - Reina del Banano México 2026
- Vanessa Rodelo - Miss México Elite 2023

== Titleholders ==
The following are the names of the annual winners of Miss Querétaro, listed in ascending order, as well as their results during the national Miss México pageant. State queens who represented the country in a current or past franchise of the national organization are also highlighted in a specific color.

Current Franchises:

- Competed at Miss World.
- Competed at Miss Supranational.
- Competed at Miss Cosmo.
- Competed at Miss Elite.
- Competed at Top Model of the World.
- Competed at Reina Internacional del Café.
- Competed at Reina Mundial del Banano.
- Competed at Miss Continentes Unidos.
- Competed at Miss Global City.

Former Franchises:

- Competed at Miss Grand International.
- Competed at Miss Costa Maya International.

Year	Titleholder	Hometown	Placement	Special Award	Notes
2026	Paulina Rodríguez	Querétaro	TBD		Top 10 at Miss Teen International 2023; Miss Teen International México 2023; Teen Universe Querétaro 2022
2025	Alejandra Correa Rodríguez	San Juan del Río	-	-	Will compete at Reina Mundial del Banano 2026; Reina del Banano México 2026; Top 12 at Miss Cosmo México 2025; Reina de la Feria de San Juan del Río 2018
2024	In 2024, due to changes in the dates of the national pageant, the election of the state queens was postponed for one year.				
2023	María Elena Martínez Escutia	San Juan del Río	Top 16	-	Top 8 at Miss México Top Model of the World 2024
2022	In 2022, due to changes in the dates of the national pageant, the election of the state queens was postponed for one year.				
2021	Fernanda Vanessa Rodelo Mendivi	Querétaro	Miss México Elite	-	Competed at Miss Elite 2023
2020	In 2020, due to the contingency of COVID-19 there was a lag in the year of the state contest				
2019	Valeria Ruiz Hernández	Monterrey	-	-	Top 6 at Miss Nuevo León 2024; Señorita Regia 2023; Competed at Miss México Elite 2022; 1st Runner-up at Miss Nuevo León 2019; Competed at Mexicana Universal Nuevo León 2017; Was born and raised in Nuevo León
2018	Karen Gastélum Espinoza	Mexico City	Top 10	-	Competed at Miss Ciudad de México 2018; 2nd Princess at Reina de la Feria de San Marcos 2013; Wss born and raised in Mexico City
2017	Mayra Alejandra Vázquez Lara	Querétaro	-	-	-
2016	Ruth Eustolia Grosser Alcántara	Corregidora	Top 10	-	Top 15 at Reina Turismo México 2015; Reina Turismo Querétaro 2015; 2nd Runner-up at Nuestra Belleza Querétaro 2011; First Mexican-german born in Querétaro; Eustolia Alcántara's daughter, Señorita Querétaro 1989

== See also ==
- Mexicana Universal Querétaro
