= Miss Nayarit =

State-level contest in Nayarit, Mexico

- Formation: 2016
- Type: Beauty Pageant
- Headquarters: Tepic
- Location: Mexico
- Local Coordinator: Mario Nasser

Miss Nayarit is a state-level contest in the state of Nayarit, Mexico, which selects the state representative for the national contest Miss México, thus aspiring to represent the country internationally on one of the platforms offered.

The state organization has achieved the following results since 2016:

- Winner: 1 (2025)
- 4th Runner-up: 1 (2021)
- Top 16: 1 (2016)
- Unplaced: 4 (2017, 2018, 2019, 2023)

== National Queens ==
- Ruslana Zicaru - Reina del Café México 2026

== Titleholders ==
The following are the names of the annual winners of Miss Nayarit, listed in ascending order, as well as their results during the national Miss México pageant. State queens who represented the country in a current or past franchise of the national organization are also highlighted in a specific color.

Current Franchises:

- Competed at Miss World.
- Competed at Miss Supranational.
- Competed at Miss Cosmo.
- Competed at Miss Elite.
- Competed at Top Model of the World.
- Competed at Reina Internacional del Café.
- Competed at Reina Mundial del Banano.
- Competed at Miss Continentes Unidos.
- Competed at Miss Global City.

Former Franchises:

- Competed at Miss Grand International.
- Competed at Miss Costa Maya International.

Year	Titleholder	Hometown	Placement	Special Award	Notes
2026	Silvia Leticia Pelayo Vidrio	Puerto Vallarta	TBD		
2025	Ruslana Zicaru Hurtado Remenyuk	Bahía de Banderas	Reina del Café México	Miss Congeniality	2nd Runner-up at Reinado Internacional del Café 2026; First Mexican-ucranian born in Nayarit
2024	Due to changes in the dates of the national pageant, the election of the state queens was postponed for this year.				
2023	Fátima Jacqueline Caro García	Xalisco	-	-	Reina de la Feria del Elote Xalisco 2023
2022	Due to changes in the dates of the national pageant, the election of the state queens was postponed for this year.				
2021	Mónica Lizbeth Carrillo Coronado	Acaponeta	4th Runner-up	-	1st Runner-up at Miss México Supranational 2023; 1st Runner-up at Mexicana Universal Nayarit 2017; Embajadora del Orgullo Nayarit 2014; Miss Teen Earth-Air 2014; Top 8 at Miss Earth México 2014; Miss Earth Nayarit 2014
2020	Due to the contingency of COVID-19 there was a lag in the year of the state contest				
2019	Alejandra Maricela Ávila Denis (Dethroned)	Tuxpan	Did not Compete	-	2nd Runner-up at Nuestra Belleza Nayarit 2016; Embajadora del Orgullo Nayarit 2015
2019	Lenaura Blessing Ifeoma Chukwu (Assumed)	San Blas	-	Miss Sports	1st Runner-up at Miss Nayarit 2019; First Mexican-nigerian born in Nigeria
2018	Arlett Gutiérrez Corona	Ixtlán del Río	-	Miss Photogenic	-
2017	Andrea González Gómez	Bahía de Banderas	-	-	-
2016	Diana Camila Villalvazo Osoria	Tepic	Top 16	-	Top 15 at Miss México Grand 2017; Competed at Miss Teen Universe México 2015; Miss Teen Universe Nayarit 2015

== See also ==
- Mexicana Universal Nayarit
