= Miss Campeche =

State-level contest in Campeche, Mexico

- Formation: 2016
- Type: Beauty Pageant
- Headquarters: Monterrey
- Location: Mexico
- Local Coordinator: Raúl Rosado

Miss Campeche is a state-level contest in the state of Campeche, Mexico, which selects the state representative for the national contest Miss México, thus aspiring to represent the country internationally on one of the platforms offered.

The state organization has achieved the following results since 2016:

- Top 16: 1 (2017)
- Unplaced: 7 (2016, 2018, 2019, 2021, 2023, 2025)

== Titleholders ==
The following are the names of the annual winners of Miss Campeche, listed in ascending order, as well as their results during the national Miss México pageant. State queens who represented the country in a current or past franchise of the national organization are also highlighted in a specific color.

Current Franchises:

- Competed at Miss World.
- Competed at Miss Supranational.
- Competed at Miss Cosmo.
- Competed at Miss Elite.
- Competed at Top Model of the World.
- Competed at Reina Internacional del Café.
- Competed at Reina Mundial del Banano.
- Competed at Miss Continentes Unidos.
- Competed at Miss Global City.

Former Franchises:

- Competed at Miss Grand International.
- Competed at Miss Costa Maya International.

Year	Titleholder	Hometown	Placement	Special Award	Notes
2026	Carla Paola Martínez Chulini	Campeche	TBD		Reina del Carnaval de Campeche 2026
2025	Gabriela Beltrán	Monterrey	-	-	Top 12 at Miss México Cosmo 2025; Competed at Miss Teen Charm International 2024; Miss Teen Charm Riviera Maya 2024; Competed at Wonderful Teen International 2024; Wonderful Teen Riviera Maya 2024; Competed at Miss Junventud México 2024; Teen Juventud Nuevo León 2024; Competed at Teen Universe Nuevo León 2022; Was born and raised in Nuevo León
2024	Due to changes in the dates of the national pageant, the election of the state queens was postponed for this year.				
2023	Daniela Alcázar Telis	Campeche	-	Miss Sports	Top 10 at Miss México Supranational 2025
2022	Due to changes in the dates of the national pageant, the election of the state queens was postponed for this year.				
2021	Elsa Donají Zavala Martínez	Querétaro	-	-	2nd Runner-up at Miss Querétaro 2021; Top 5 at Miss Michoacán 2016; Competed at Miss Earth Michoacán 2015; Was born and raised in Michoacán
2020	Due to the contingency of COVID-19 there was a lag in the year of the state contest				
2019	Jennifer Álvarez Ruíz	Campeche	-	Dances of Mexico	Competed at Miss Orb International 2022; Miss Orb Cuba 2022; Competed at Miss México Elite 2022; Competed at Reinado Internacional del Café 2022; Reina del Café Cuba 2022; Competed at Miss International 2018; Miss Cuba International 2018; First Mexican-cuban born in Cuba
2018	Paloma Yazmin Sandoval Mendoza	Escárcega	-	-	Duquesa at Reina Turismo México 2016; Reina Turismo Campeche 2016; Competed at Miss Earth México 2015; Miss Earth Campeche 2015; Linda Campechana 014
2017	Gabriela Paola Gutiérrez Guerrero	Campeche	Top 16	-	Mexicana Universal Campeche 2023; Reina del Carnaval de Campeche 2017; 1st Runner-up at Teen Universe México 2015; Teen Universe Campeche 2015
2016	Monique Nicole Lomelí Canavaggio	Campeche	-	-	-

== See also ==
- Mexicana Universal Campeche
