= Denisse Franco =

Mexican model

- Born: Denisse Iridane Franco Piña; March 3, 1998 (age 28); Culiacán, Sinaloa, Mexico
- Occupation: Model
- Height: 1.76 m (5 ft 9 1/2 in)
- Title: Nuestra Belleza Sinaloa 2016; Nuestra Belleza México 2017

Denisse Iridane Franco Piña (born March 3, 1998) is a Mexican model and beauty pageant titleholder who won Miss Mexico 2017.

Franco was previously won Nuestra Belleza México 2017 and represented Mexico at the Miss Universe 2017 pageant, but she failed to enter the Top 16 semifinals, and she was the last candidate to hold the title of Nuestra Belleza Mexico before the organization changed its name to Mexicana Universal.

== Personal life ==
Franco was born in Culiacán, Sinaloa, Mexico. She works as a professional model.

== Pageantry ==
Franco was crowned Nuestra Belleza Sinaloa in her hometown. On March 11, 2017, she won the national title of Nuestra Belleza México 2017.

Franco represented Mexico at the Miss Universe 2017 pageant in Las Vegas on November 26, 2017, but did not place.

Awards and achievements
Preceded by Karolina Vidale; Michoacáns	Miss Mexico; 2022	Succeeded by Incumbent
Preceded by Kristal Silva; Tamaulipas	Nuestra Belleza México; 2017	Succeeded by Andrea Toscano; Colima
Preceded by Patricia de la Vega	Nuestra Belleza Sinaloa; 2016	Succeeded by Mariely Leal
