= Miss Guerrero =

State-level contest in Guerrero, Mexico

- Formation: 2016
- Type: Beauty Pageant
- Headquarters: Acapulco
- Location: Mexico
- Local Coordinator: Cristopher Acosta

Miss Guerrero is a state-level contest in the state of Guerrero, Mexico, which selects the state representative for the national contest Miss México, thus aspiring to represent the country internationally on one of the platforms offered.

The state organization has achieved the following results since 2016:

- 1st Runner-up: 1 (2016)
- Top 10/11: 1 (2018)
- Top 16: 2 (2021, 2023)
- Unplaced: 3 (2017, 2019, 2025)

== National Queens ==
- Carol Méndez - Reina del Banano México 2025 (Designated)
- Samantha Leyva - Miss Supranational México 2017 (Designated)

== Titleholders ==
The following are the names of the annual winners of Miss Guerrero, listed in ascending order, as well as their results during the national Miss México pageant. State queens who represented the country in a current or past franchise of the national organization are also highlighted in a specific color.

Current Franchises:

- Competed at Miss World.
- Competed at Miss Supranational.
- Competed at Miss Cosmo.
- Competed at Miss Elite.
- Competed at Top Model of the World.
- Competed at Reina Internacional del Café.
- Competed at Reina Mundial del Banano.
- Competed at Miss Continentes Unidos.
- Competed at Miss Global City.

Former Franchises:

- Competed at Miss Grand International.
- Competed at Miss Costa Maya International.

Year	Titleholder	Hometown	Placement	Special Award	Notes
2026	Vanessa Pineda	Cutzamala	TBD		2nd Runner-up at Reina Internacional del Pacífico 2026; Señorita Tierra Caliente 2023
2025	Isadora Lagos (Resigned)	Acapulco	Did not Compete	-	-
2025	Victoria Zermeño (Assumed)	Aguascalientes	-	-	1st Runner-up at Embajadora México 2022; Embajadora Aguascalientes 2022; Was born and raised in Aguascalientes
2024	Due to changes in the dates of the national pageant, the election of the state queens was postponed for this year.				
2023	Carol Marianne Méndez Roa	Iguala	Top 16	Best National Costume; Dances of Mexico	Top 10 at Reina Mundial del Banano 2025; Reina del Banano México 2025
2022	Due to changes in the dates of the national pageant, the election of the state queens was postponed for this year.				
2021	Mariana Estrada Hernández (Resigned)	Iguala	Did not Compete	-	Reina de la Bandera 2020
2021	Diana Karen Marín Sandoval (Assumed)	Aguascalientes	Top 16	-	Will Compete at Miss Universe México 2026; Miss Universe Aguascalientes 2026; Competed at Mexicana Universal Jalisco 2021; 3rd Runner-up at Mexicana Universal Aguascalientes 2019; Was born and raised in Aguascalientes
2020	Due to the contingency of COVID-19 there was a lag in the year of the state contest				
2019	Isabel Aurora Ruiz Gómez	Acapulco	-	-	Competed at Miss Universe México 2025; Miss Universe Guerrero 2025; 1st Runner-up at Reina del Carnaval Acapulco; Top 3 at Miss México Elite 2022; Competed at Miss Guerrero 2018
2018	Jennifer Vázquez Galeana	San Marcos	Top 10	Beauty with a Purpose	Sanmarqueña Bonita 2017
2017	Itziar Alarcón (Resigned)	Atizapán	Did not Compete	-	2nd Runner-up at Miss Estado de México 2017; Was born and raised in Estado de México
2017	Mavi Gabriela Miranda Esparza (Resigned)	Cocula	-	-	-
2016	Aida Samantha Leyva Trujillo	Acapulco	1st Runner-up	Miss Multimedia	Top 25 at Miss Supranational 2017; Miss Supranational México 2017; Top 8 at Miss Grand México 2017

== See also ==
- Mexicana Universal Guerrero
