= Irma Miranda =

Mexican model and TV host (born 1996)

- Born: Irma Cristina Miranda Valenzuela; August 15, 1996 (age 29); Ciudad Obregón, Sonora, Mexico
- Education: Sonora Institute of Technology
- Occupation: TV host
- Height: 1.74 m (5 ft 8 1/2 in)
- Title: Mexicana Universal Sonora 2022; Mexicana Universal 2022

Irma Cristina Miranda Valenzuela (born August 15, 1996) is a Mexican model, TV host and beauty pageant titleholder who was crowned Mexicana Universal 2022 at the pageant on May 21, 2022. As Mexicana Universal, Miranda represented Mexico at the Miss Universe 2022 competition.

== Early life and education ==
Miranda was born in Ciudad Obregón, Sonora. She earned her bachelor's degree in economics and finance at Sonora Institute of Technology in Ciudad Obregón.

== Pageantry ==
=== Mexicana Universal 2022 ===
As Mexicana Universal Sonora, Miranda received the right to represent Sonora at the Mexicana Universal 2022 pageant held at the Centro de Convenciones in San Luis Potosí. In the pageant, Miranda advanced to the top sixteen and ultimately the top five.

Miranda went on to win the competition and was crowned Miss Universe Mexico 2022 by outgoing titleholder Débora Hallal of Sinaloa.

=== Miss Universe 2022 ===
As Mexicana Universal, Miranda represented Mexico at the Miss Universe 2022 competition in January 14, 2023, but she did not make it to the Top 16.

Awards and achievements
| Preceded by Yamelin Ramírez | Nuestra Belleza Sonora; 2015 | Succeeded by María José Antillón |
| Preceded by Karina Martin | Nuestra Belleza México 1st Runner-Up; 2016 | Succeeded by Citlaly Higuera |
| Preceded by Karla Ochoa | Mexicana Universal Sonora; 2021 | Succeeded by Coralia Vega Jiménez |
| Preceded by Débora Hallal | Mexicana Universal; 2022 | Succeeded by Melissa Flores |
