= Nuestra Belleza Querétaro 2011 =

- Date: July 14, 2011
- Venue: Centro de Congresos Querétaro, Querétaro, Querétaro
- Broadcaster: Televisa
- Entrants: 9
- Placements: 4
- Winner: Adriana Martínez; Querétaro

Nuestra Belleza Querétaro 2011, was held at the Centro de Congresos Querétaro in Querétaro, Querétaro on July 14, 2011. At the conclusion of the final night of competition Adriana Martínez of Querétaro City was crowned the winner. Martínez was crowned by outgoing Nuestra Belleza Querétaro titleholder María Perusquía. Nine contestants competed for the title.

== Results ==
=== Placements ===
Final results	Contestant
Nuestra Belleza Querétaro 2011	Adriana Martínez
Suplente / 1st Runner-up	Magaly Morales
2nd Runner-up	Ruth Grosser
3rd Runner-up	Michelle Vera

== Background Music ==
- Ragazzi

== Contestants ==
Hometown	Contestant	Age
Querétaro	Adriana Martínez de Anda	19
Querétaro	Celia Andrea González Quintanar	20
Querétaro	Elizabeth Carolina Brizuela Padilla	19
Querétaro	Erica Killian Lizaldi	23
Querétaro	Mayela Thomas Perusquía	19
Querétaro	Magaly Morales Hidalgo	18
Querétaro	Michelle Vera Hinojosa	19
Querétaro	Ruth Eustolia Grosser Alacántara	20
Querétaro	Sharon Enid Gaona Gochicoa	20
