= Nuestra Belleza Durango 2012 =

- Date: June 14, 2012
- Entertainment: Orlando Reséndiz
- Venue: Teatro Ricardo Castro, Durango, Durango.
- Broadcaster: Televisa
- Entrants: 7
- Placements: 4
- Winner: Ana Victoria Sánchez; Durango City

Nuestra Belleza Durango 2012, was a beauty contest held at the Teatro Ricardo Castro in Durango, Durango, Mexico on June 14, 2012. At the conclusion of the final night of competition, Ana Victoria Sánchez of Durango City was crowned the winner. Sánchez was crowned by outgoing Nuestra Belleza Durango titleholder, Mónica Ayala. Eight contestants competed for the title.

== Results ==
=== Placements ===
Final results	Contestant
Nuestra Belleza Durango 2012	Ana Victoria Sánchez
Suplente / 1st Runner-up	Nidia Salas Félix
2nd Runner-up	Monserrat Romo
3rd Runner-up	Martha Delfina Hernández.

=== Special awards ===
Award	Contestant
Miss Photogenic	Nidia Salas Félix
Miss Congeniality	Diana Ravelo
Miss Elegance	Ana Victoria Sánchez
Best Figure	Martha Delfina Hernández.

== Judges ==
- Melina Carrete
- Carmen Saláis
- Ofelia Correa - Regional coordinator of Nuestra Belleza México
- Patricia Brogeras - Regional coordinator of Nuestra Belleza México
- Marcela Máynez - Nuestra Belleza Durango 2009
- Carlo Eduardo Rico - Televisa producer
- Sonia García

== Background music ==
- Orlando Reséndiz

== Contestants ==
Contestant	Age	Height	Hometown
Ana Victoria Alexandra Sánchez Soto	23	1.70	Durango
Carmen Ibarra Samaniego	22	1.72	Durango
Daniela Castillo	19	1.69	Durango
Diana Elizabeth Ravelo Luna	22	1.70	Santa Catarina de Tepehuanes
Martha Delfina Hernández	23	1.70	Lerdo
Monserrat Romo	21	1.74	Durango
Nidia Salas Félix	20	1.77	Durango
