= Miss Yucatán =

Beauty pageant in Yucatán, Mexico

- Formation: 2016
- Type: Beauty pageant
- Headquarters: Veracruz
- Location: Mexico
- Local Coordinator: Suheil Cabrera

Miss Yucatán is a state-level contest in the state of Yucatán, Mexico, which selects the state representative for the national contest Miss México, thus aspiring to represent the country internationally on one of the platforms offered.

The state organization has achieved the following results since 2016:

- 3rd Runner-up: 1 (2021)
- Top 10/11: 1 (2017, 2019)
- Top 16: 1 (2025)
- Unplaced: 3 (2016, 2018, 2023)

== National Queens ==
- Ana Paulina Rivero - Reina del Café México 2023 (Designated)
- Mónica Hernández - Miss México Costa Maya 2019 (Designated)
- Mónica Hernández - Reina del Café México 2019 (Designated)

== Titleholders ==
The following are the names of the annual winners of Miss Yucatán, listed in ascending order, as well as their results during the national Miss México pageant. State queens who represented the country in a current or past franchise of the national organization are also highlighted in a specific color.

Current Franchises:

- Competed at Miss World.
- Competed at Miss Supranational.
- Competed at Miss Cosmo.
- Competed at Miss Elite.
- Competed at Top Model of the World.
- Competed at Reina Internacional del Café.
- Competed at Reina Mundial del Banano.
- Competed at Miss Continentes Unidos.
- Competed at Miss Global City.

Former Franchises:

- Competed at Miss Grand International.
- Competed at Miss Costa Maya International.

Year	Titleholder	Hometown	Placement	Special Award	Notes
2026	TBA				
2025	Angélica Briones Landeros	Ciudad Juárez	Top 16	-	Will compete at Miss Global City 2026; Miss México Global City 2026; Top 12 at Miss México Cosmo 2025; Competed at Miss Chihuahua 2021; Was born and raised in Chihuahua
2024	In 2024, due to changes in the dates of the national pageant, the election of the state queens was postponed for one year.				
2023	Vianey Cardós	Mérida	-	-	Top 8 at Miss México Top Model of the World 2024
2022	In 2022, due to changes in the dates of the national pageant, the election of the state queens was postponed for one year.				
2021	Emma Soledad Puerto Arteaga	Mérida	3rd Runner-up	Miss Multimedia	Teen Globe International 2019; Teen Globe México 2019; Teen Globe Yucatán 2019
2020	In 2020, due to the contingency of COVID-19 there was a lag in the year of the state contest				
2019	Ana Paulina Rivero Hernández	Mérida	Top 10	Miss Talent	Top 16 at Miss Universe México 2024; Miss Universe Yucatán 2024; Competed at Reinado Internacional del Café 2023; Reina del Café México 2023; Competed at Miss México Elite 2022
2018	Edsamar Suey Hernández Rodríguez	Mérida	-	-	-
2017	Mónica Fernanda Hernández Reynaga	Mérida	Top 10	Miss Talent; Miss Sports	1st Runner-up at Miss Costa Maya International 2019; Miss México Costa Maya 2019; Competed at Reinado Internacional del Café 2019; Reina del Café México 2019; Top 8 at Miss Eco International 2018; Miss Eco México 2018; Miss Earth México-Fire 2015; Miss Earth Yucatán 2015
2016	María Carolina Estrada Fritz	Mérida	-	-	-

== See also ==
- Mexicana Universal Yucatán
