= Miss Hidalgo =

State-level contest in Hidalgo, Mexico

- Formation: 2016
- Type: Beauty Pageant
- Headquarters: Pachuca
- Location: Mexico
- Local Coordinator: Rigoberto Gori & Juan Bautista

Miss Hidalgo is a state-level contest in the state of Hidalgo, Mexico, which selects the state representative for the national contest Miss México, thus aspiring to represent the country internationally on one of the platforms offered.

The state organization has achieved the following results since 2016:

- Winner: 1 (2023)
- 1st Runner-up: 1 (2025)
- Top 5/6: 1 (2018)
- Unplaced: 3 (2016, 2017, 2019, 2021)

== National Queens ==
- Angie Melchum - Miss Supranational México 2025

== Titleholders ==
The following are the names of the annual winners of Miss Hidalgo, listed in ascending order, as well as their results during the national Miss México pageant. State queens who represented the country in a current or past franchise of the national organization are also highlighted in a specific color.

Current Franchises:

- Competed at Miss World.
- Competed at Miss Supranational.
- Competed at Miss Cosmo.
- Competed at Miss Elite.
- Competed at Top Model of the World.
- Competed at Reina Internacional del Café.
- Competed at Reina Mundial del Banano.
- Competed at Miss Continentes Unidos.
- Competed at Miss Global City.

Former Franchises:

- Competed at Miss Grand International.
- Competed at Miss Costa Maya International.

Year	Titleholder	Hometown	Placement	Special Award	Notes
2026	Ivanna Rodríguez	San Bartolo	TBD		
2025	María de la Luz Mondragón Orozco	Pachuca	1st Runner-up	Miss Multimedia	-
2024	Due to changes in the dates of the national pageant, the election of the state queens was postponed for this year.				
2023	Angie López Melchum	Tulancingo	Miss México Supranational	Beauty with a Purpose	Top 24 at Miss Supranational 2025; Top 16 at Miss México Top Model of the World 2024
2022	Due to changes in the dates of the national pageant, the election of the state queens was postponed for this year.				
2021	Alejandra Suárez Pérez	Pachuca	-	-	Competed at Miss Earth Hidalgo 2020
2020	Due to the contingency of COVID-19 there was a lag in the year of the state contest				
2019	Jaqueline Gómez Cisneros	Tulancingo	-	-	3rd Runner-up at Reina Internacional del Cacao 2022; Reina del Cacao México 2022
2018	Jessica Huerta Ramírez	Tizayuca	Top 5	-	Top 3 at Miss México Elite 2022; Top 6 at Miss México Grand 2020; Miss México Centro
2017	Erica Priscila Viveros Estrada	Tezontepec	-	Miss Congeniality; Head to Head	-
2016	Jennifer Rodríguez García	Pachuca	-	-	Top 15 at Miss México Grand 2017

== See also ==
- Mexicana Universal Hidalgo
