= Sofía Aragón =

Mexican beauty pageant titleholder (born 1994)

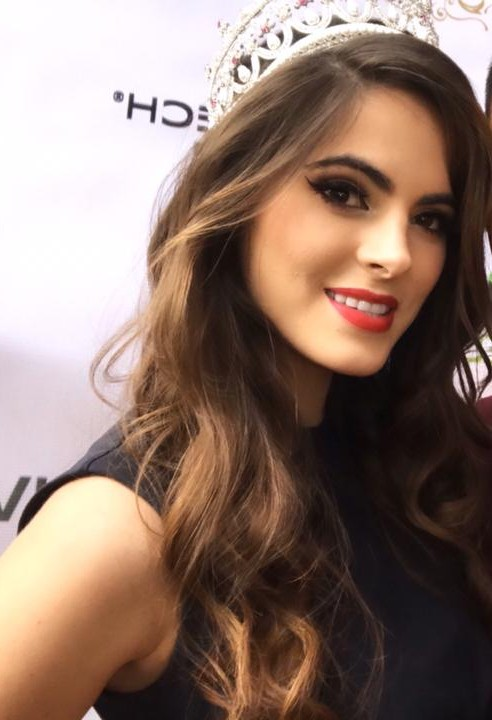
- Aragón in 2020
- Born: Sofía Montserrat Aragón Torres; 13 February 1994 (age 32); Guadalajara, Jalisco, Mexico
- Beauty pageant titleholder
- Title: Mexicana Universal Jalisco 2018; Mexicana Universal 2019
- Major competitions: Mexicana Universal 2019; (Winner); Miss Universe 2019; (2nd Runner-Up)

Sofía Montserrat Aragón Torres (born 13 February 1994) is a Mexican beauty pageant titleholder who was crowned Mexicana Universal 2019. She represented Mexico at the Miss Universe 2019 competition, where she finished as second runner-up.

== Personal life ==
Aragón was born on 13 February 1994 in Guadalajara, Jalisco.

Aragón has said she contemplated suicide, and has become an advocate for mental health awareness and suicide prevention, working with the organization Sonrisas Reales as a public speaker and writer.

== Pageantry ==
In 2019 she competed for the title of Mexicana Universal Jalisco, aiming to represent her state at Mexicana Universal 2019. She was not selected and Dorothy Sutherland became the Mexican representative instead. After Sutherland came in breach of her contract for not appearing at required events, she was replaced by Aragón as Mexicana Universal Jalisco 2018.

Days after her appointment, Aragón competed in the Mexicana Universal 2019 competition in Mexico City. She was selected as one of the top twenty finalists following the first round on 16 June, and entered the top ten prior to the final held on 23 June. During the 23 June airing, Aragón was crowned Mexicana Universal by outgoing titleholder Andrea Toscano, besting first runner-up Claudia Lozano Domínguez of Nuevo León. She represented Mexico at Miss Universe 2019, where she placed as the second runner-up, the highest placement for Mexico since Ximena Navarrete, who won Miss Universe 2010.

== Filmography ==
=== Television ===
Year	Title	Role
2020-2022	La Voz	Backstage host
2021-2022	Venga la alegría	Weekend show's host
2024	Oríllese a la orilla	Dr. Susy
2025	Velvet: El nuevo imperio	Bárbara Otegui

Awards and achievements
Preceded by (Venezuela) Sthefany Gutiérrez	Miss Universe 2nd Runner-Up; 2019	Succeeded by (Peru) Janick Maceta
Preceded by (Colima) Andrea Toscano	Mexicana Universal; 2019	Succeeded by (Chihuahua (state)) Andrea Meza
Preceded by Dorothy Sutherland (Dethroned)	Mexicana Universal Jalisco; 2018	Succeeded by Michel López
