= Yuridia Durán =

Mexican model who won Mexicana Universal Internacional 2020

- Born: Yuridia del Carmen Durán Peña; December 20, 1998 (age 27); Ahuacatlán, Nayarit, Mexico
- Height: 1.73 m (5 ft 8 in)
- Beauty pageant titleholder
- Title: Mexicana Universal Nayarit 2018; Mexicana Universal Internacional 2020
- Hair color: Brown
- Eye color: Blue
- Major competitions: Mexicana Universal 2019 (Winner - Mexicana Universersal International); Miss International 2022 (Unplaced)

Yuridia del Carmen Durán Peña (born December 20, 1998) is a Mexican model and beauty pageant titleholder who participated in Mexicana Universal 2019 and won the title of Mexicana Universal Internacional 2020. She represented Mexico in Miss International 2022 pageant held in Tokyo, Japan.

== Early life ==
Yuridia was born on December 20, 1998, in Ahuacatlán, Nayarit. As of 2019 she was studying to become a dental surgeon at the Universidad Autónoma de Nayarit.

== Pageantry ==
At 19 years old, Yuridia was crowned Reina de la Feria de Nayarit 2018. That same year, when she was still holding this title, she decided to participate in Mexicana Universal Nayarit 2018, which took place on December 15, 2018, where she was the winner. On June 23, 2019, the final of Mexicana Universal was held and Yuridia managed to win the title of Mexicana Universal Internacional 2020, being crowned by Mariem Velazco, Miss International 2018.

On September 25, 2021, Yuridia was a special guest at the Reina de la Feria Ahuacatlán 2021 pageant, during which she tripped on the hem of her long gown and fell down, causing her crown to slip from her head. She represented Mexico at Miss International 2022 pageant that took place in Tokyo Dome, Japan. Where she failed to rank in the top 15.

Awards and achievements
Preceded by (Colima) Andrea Toscano	Mexicana Universal Internacional; 2020	Succeeded by (Colima) Itzia García
Preceded by (Nayarit) Viridiana Zamora	Mexicana Universal Nayarit; 2018	Succeeded by (Nayarit) Victoria Leija
