= Miss Colima =

State-level contest in Colima, Mexico

- Formation: 2016
- Type: Beauty Pageant
- Headquarters: Colima
- Location: Mexico
- Local Coordinator: Cristian Alamilla

Miss Colima is a state-level contest in the state of Colima, Mexico, which selects the state representative for the national contest Miss México, thus aspiring to represent the country internationally on one of the platforms offered.

The state organization has achieved the following results since 2016:

- 1st Runner-up: 1 (2021)
- Top 5/6: 1 (2018)
- Top 10/11: 1 (2019)
- Unplaced: 1 (2016, 2017, 2023, 2025)

== National Queens ==
- Sofía Zamora - Miss México Supranational 2026 (Designated)
- Sofía Zamora - Miss México Global City 2025 (Designated)
- Daniela Ramírez - Reina del Café México 2022 (Designated)

== Titleholders ==
The following are the names of the annual winners of Miss Colima, listed in ascending order, as well as their results during the national Miss México pageant. State queens who represented the country in a current or past franchise of the national organization are also highlighted in a specific color.

Current Franchises:

- Competed at Miss World.
- Competed at Miss Supranational.
- Competed at Miss Cosmo.
- Competed at Miss Elite.
- Competed at Top Model of the World.
- Competed at Reina Internacional del Café.
- Competed at Reina Mundial del Banano.
- Competed at Miss Continentes Unidos.
- Competed at Miss Global City.

Former Franchises:

- Competed at Miss Grand International.
- Competed at Miss Costa Maya International.

Year	Titleholder	Hometown	Placement	Special Award	Notes
2026	TBA				
2025	Luisa Vallejo	Ecatepec	-	-	Top 3 at Miss Estado de México 2025; Was born and raised in Estado de México
2024	Due to changes in the dates of the national pageant, the election of the state queens was postponed for this year.				
2023	María Fernanda Sánchez Nares	Colima	-	Miss Congeniality	Competed at Embajadora Feria de Todos los Santos Colima 2022
2022	Due to changes in the dates of the national pageant, the election of the state queens was postponed for this year.				
2021	Sofía Zamora Macías	Colima	1st Runner-up	Beauty with a Purpose	Will compete at Miss Supranational 2026; Miss México Supranational 2026; 1st Runner-up at Miss México Supranational 2025; Competed at Miss Global City 2025; Miss México Global City 2025; 1st Runner-up at Miss México 2024; Miss Quintana Roo 2023
2020	Due to the contingency of COVID-19 there was a lag in the year of the state contest				
2019	Adriana Daniela Ramírez Cruz	Colima	Top 10	Dances of Mexico	Competed at Reinado Internacional del Café 2022; Reina del Café México 2022; Miss United Countries 2016; Top 8 at Miss Earth México 2015; Miss Earth Colima 2015
2018	Kenia Pineda Sánchez (Dethroned)	Manzanillo	Did not Compete	-	
2018	Vanesa Hernández Pérez (Sucessor)	Coquimatlán	Top 5	-	Miss México Occidente; Top 6 at Miss México Grand 2020; Top 15 at Global Charity Queen 2018; 1st Runner-up at Mexicana Universal Colima 2017; Reina de las Fiestas de Coquimatlán 2012
2017	Lizbeth Fernanda Rodríguez Álvarez	Villa de Álvarez	-	-	-
2016	Claudia Lucero Delgado Munguía	Colima	-	-	1st Runner-up at Reina de Colima 2010

== See also ==
- Mexicana Universal Colima
