= Kristal Silva =

Mexican beauty pageant titleholder (born 1991)

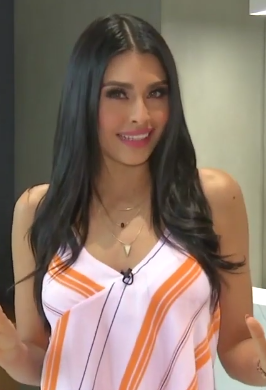
- Born: Yuselmi Kristal Silva Dávila; 26 December 1991 (age 34); Ciudad Victoria, Tamaulipas, Mexico
- Height: 1.78 m (5 ft 10 in)
- Beauty pageant titleholder
- Hair color: Dark brown
- Eye color: Amber
- Major competitions: Miss Earth México 2013; (Winner); Miss Earth 2013; (Top 8); Nuestra Belleza México 2016; (Winner); Miss Universe 2016; (Top 9)

Yuselmi Kristal Silva Dávila is a Mexican TV host, model and beauty pageant titleholder who won Nuestra Belleza México 2016 and represented his country at the Miss Universe 2016 pageant, where she placed Top 9.

== Early life and education ==
Silva was born December 26, 1991 in Ciudad Victoria, Tamaulipas. During her school years, she experienced bullying due to her height, which contributed to insecurities and the development of eating disorders in adolescence. Silva pursued her higher education at the Universidad Autónoma de Tamaulipas (UAT), where she enrolled in the business administration degree program.

== Career ==
In 2013, Silva began her career in pageantry winning the Miss Earth México title, representing the country at Miss Earth 2013, where she placed Top 8. Three years later, she was crowned Nuestra Belleza México, earning the opportunity to compete at Miss Universe 2016, where she advanced to the Top 9.

In 2018, Silva moved to Mexico City and joined TV Azteca as a co-host on Venga la Alegría, where her spontaneous energy and engaging personality quickly made her a beloved figure among audiences. She has since become a staple on the program, often sharing insights from her pageant experiences and personal stories, including overcoming adolescent eating disorders stemming from beauty industry pressures. In 2021, Silva ventured into reality television by participating in Survivor México, demonstrating her physical resilience and strategic mindset during the competition.

Awards and achievements
Preceded by (Yucatán) Lourdes Paola Aguilar	Miss Earth México; 2013	Next: (Sinaloa) Yareli Carrillo
Preceded by (Aguascalientes) Wendolly Esparza	Nuestra Belleza México; 2016	Next: (Sinaloa) Denisse Franco
