= Nuestra Belleza Chiapas 2011 =

- Date: July 17, 2011
- Presenters: Natalia Ruiz y César Cancino (Local Public TV)
- Venue: Tuxtla Gutiérrez, Chiapas
- Broadcaster: TV10 (Local Public TV)
- Entrants: 10
- Placements: 5
- Debuts: Juárez
- Withdrawals: Acapetahua, Catazajá, Tecpatán, Villa Corzo, Villaflores
- Winner: Krytell Padilla; Tonalá

Nuestra Belleza Chiapas 2011, was held in Tuxtla Gutiérrez, Chiapas on July 17, 2011. At the conclusion of the final night of competition, Krystell Padilla of Tonalá was crowned as the winner. Padilla was crowned by outgoing Nuestra Belleza Chiapas titleholder Grisell Hernández. Ten contestants competed for the crown.

== Results ==
=== Placements ===
Final results	Contestant
Nuestra Belleza Chiapas 2012	Tonalá - Krystell Padilla Sáyago
Nuestra Belleza Turismo Chiapas 2012	Arriaga - María Fernanda Vázquez Martínez
Reina de la Feria Chiapas	Cintalapa - Karla Von Smelling Ernult

== Background Music ==
- Carlos Macías
- Daniel Luján

== Contestants ==
Hometown	Contestant	Age	Height
Arriaga	María Fernanda Vázquez Martínez	18	169
Cintalapa	Karla Von Smelling Ernult	23	171
Comitán	Laura Patricia Pinto Pineda	23	170
Tuxtla Gutiérrez	Montserrat Zentella Quezada	21	172
Tuxtla Gutiérrez	Darian Ivonne Domínguez Santiago	19	174
Tuxtla Gutiérrez	Tania Lara Cigarroa	21	174
