= Andrea Toscano =

Mexican model who won Mexicana Universal 2018

- Born: Andrea Isabel Toscano Ramírez; Manzanillo, Colima, Mexico
- Height: 1.75 m (5 ft 9 in)
- Beauty pageant titleholder
- Hair color: Brown
- Eye color: Brown
- Major competitions: Mexicana Universal Colima 2017; (Winner); Mexicana Universal 2018; (Winner); Miss Universe 2018; (Unplaced); Miss International 2019; (1st Runner-Up)

Andrea Isabel Toscano Ramírez is a Mexican beauty pageant titleholder who won Mexicana Universal 2018 on June 3, 2018. She represented Mexico at Miss Universe 2018, but was unplaced. Toscano represented Mexico at Miss International 2019 and was first runner-up.

== Pageantry ==
=== Mexicana Universal 2018 ===
Toscano began her pageantry career representing Colima, one of 24 finalists in her country's national beauty pageant Mexicana Universal 2018, held on June 3, 2018, in Foro de TV Azteca, Ciudad de México, México where she was crowned as Miss Universe Mexico 2018. She succeeded Nuestra Belleza México 2017 Denisse Franco.

=== Miss Universe 2018 ===
As Mexicana Universal, Toscano represented Mexico at the Miss Universe 2018 pageant in Bangkok, Thailand, but was unplaced.

=== Miss International 2019 ===
On 23 June 2019, Toscano was appointed by Mexicana Universal Organization as the representative of Mexico at Miss International 2019, held in Japan on November 12, 2019, and was first runner-up

Awards and achievements
Preceded by (Philippines) Ahtisa Manalo	Miss International 1st Runner-up; 2019	Succeeded by (Cape Verde) Stephany Amado
Preceded by (Jalisco) Nebai Torres	Mexicana Universal International; 2019	Succeeded by (Nayarit) Yuridia Durán
Preceded by (Sinaloa) Denisse Franco	Mexicana Universal; 2018	Succeeded by (Jalisco) Sofía Aragón
Preceded by Margarita Magaña Vega	Mexicana Universal Colima; 2017	Succeeded by Ángela Delgado
