= Mexicana Universal 2022 =

4th edition of Mexicana Universal

- Date: May 21, 2022
- Presenters: Ximena Navarrete; Andrea Meza; Fer Sagreeb
- Venue: Centro de Convenciones, San Luis Potosí
- Broadcaster: TV Azteca , Imagen TV
- Entrants: 31
- Placements: 16
- Debuts: United States
- Withdrawals: Querétaro
- Returns: Estado de México; Zacatecas
- Winner: Irma Miranda; Sonora

Mexicana Universal 2022 was the fourth edition of the Mexicana Universal pageant, held at the Centro de Convenciones in San Luis Potosí, Mexico, on May 21, 2022.

Débora Hallal of Sinaloa crowned Irma Cristina Miranda of Sonora as her successor at the end of the event. Miranda represented Mexico at the Miss Universe 2022 pageant, held in New Orleans.

== Results ==
=== Placements ===
Color keys

- The contestant won in an International pageant.
- The contestant was a Finalist/Runner-up in an International pageant.
- The contestant was a Semi-Finalist in an International pageant.
- The contestant did not place.

Placement	Contestant	International Placement
Mexicana Universal 2022	Sonora – Irma Miranda	Unplaced – Miss Universe 2022
Mexicana International 2023	Colima – Itzía Garcia	Top 7 – Miss International 2023
Mexicana Hispanoamericana 2022	Guanajuato – Diana Robles	3rd Runner-up – Reina Hispanoamericana 2022
Mexicana Latinoamericana 2023	Nayarit – Verónica Gamboa	Resigned – Nuestra Latinomericana Universal 2023
Runner-Up	Nuevo León – Mayra Valencia	
Top 16	Ciudad de México – Daniela Cardona	Top 12 – Reina Hispanoamericana 2025
Top 16	Aguascalientes – Alejandra Parada; Baja California – Krystel Aguayo; Estado de México – Desiré Ayón; Estados Unidos – Pamela Urbina; Hidalgo – Katya Hernández; Jalisco – Maria Guadalupe Vargas; Jalisco – Priscila Franco; Puebla – Paula de la Barrera; San Luis Potosí – Aranza Laguna; Tamaulipas – Melissa Mireles	

== Contestants ==
31 contestants competed in Mexicana Universal 2022:

State	Delegate	Age	Hometown	Ref.
Aguascalientes	Alejandra Parada López	22	Aguascalientes	
Baja California	Janine Krystel Aguayo Gonzalez	26	Tijuana	
Baja California Sur	Fernanda Verdugo Juarez	26	La Paz	
Campeche	Jessica Terán Castilla	23	Ciudad del Carmen	
Chiapas	Brenda Zuarth Aragon	21	Tuxtla Gutierrez	
Chihuahua	Janeth Loya Trillo	25	Ciudad Juarez	
Ciudad de México	Daniela Cardona Rosales	21	Mexico City	
Coahuila	Frida Elizabeth Reynoso Rivas	25	Torreón	
Colima	Itziá Margarita Garcia Jiménez	22	Manzanillo	
Estado de Mexico	Desiré Velázquez Ayón	22	Toluca	
Estados Unidos	Pamela Lee Urbina	23	New York	
Guanajuato	Diana Laura Abigail Robles Rivera	24	León	
Hidalgo	Katya Hernandez	25	Ixmiquilpan	
Jalisco	Maria Guadalupe Vargas Naranjo	23	Zapopan	
Jalisco	Priscila Franco Franco	26	Tepatitlán de Morelos	
Michoacán	Maria Guadalupe Barragan	27	Lazaro Cardenas	
Morelos	Dayana González	22	Cuernavaca	
Nayarit	Verónica Gamboa	23	La Yesca	
Nuevo León	Mayra Carolina Valencia Gamez	22	Monterrey	
Oaxaca	Scanda Joseline Castillo Alvarado	25	Loma Bonita	
Puebla	Paula de la Barrera Zaballa	21	Puebla	
Quintana Roo	Fernanda Sotelo	24	Cancun	
San Luis Potosí	Aranza Laguna	26	San Luis Potosí	
Sinaloa	Deisy Unzueta	25	Navolato	
Sonora	Irma Cristina Miranda Valenzuela	26	Ciudad Obregón	
Tabasco	Paola Ligonio Gamas	22	Villahermosa	
Tamaulipas	Melissa Mireles Escobedo	21	Ciudad Victoria	
Tlaxcala	Andrea Denisse Rosas Arcega	24	Chiautempan	
Veracruz	Samantha Margarita del Ángel Herrera	27	Xalapa	
Yucatán	Aryan Trava Cavazos	25	Mérida	
Zacatecas	Maria Ramírez Delgado	21	Fresnillo	

=== Withdrawals ===
- Guerrero - Due a health problems Andrea Farril, Mexicana Universal Guerrero 2021 did not compete in Mexicana Universal 2022, but she will return next year.

=== Replacements ===
- Sinaloa – Christel Ortiz was the winner of Mexicana Universal Sinaloa 2021 but resigned from the title because of personal reasons. The Suplente/1st Runner-up, Deisy Unzueta represented Sinaloa in Mexicana Universal 2022.

== Judges ==
- Rebeca Tamez - Nuestra Belleza México 1996 from Tamaulipas
- Elisa Nájera - Nuestra Belleza México 2007 from Guanajuato
- Lorena Sevilla - Nuestra Belleza Internacional México 2015
- Andrea Toscano - Mexicana Universal 2018 from Colima
- Andrea Bazarte - Mexicana Hispanoamericana 2021 and Reina Hispanoamericana 2021

== Notes ==
=== Debut ===
- United States

=== Returns ===
- Last competed in 2019:
  - Estado de Mexico
  - Zacatecas

=== Withdrawals ===
- Querétaro
