= Mexicana Universal 2018 =

1st edition of Mexicana Universal

- Date: June 3, 2018
- Presenters: Brandon Peniche; Kristal Silva
- Venue: Foro de TV Azteca, Mexico City, Mexico
- Broadcaster: TV Azteca
- Entrants: 32
- Placements: 16
- Returns: Campeche; Guerrero; Quintana Roo; Zacatecas
- Winner: Andrea Toscano; Colima

Mexicana Universal 2018 is the first edition of the Mexicana Universal beauty pageant, formerly called Nuestra Belleza Mexico until 2017. This edition will feature several changes held at the Foro de TV Azteca in Mexico City on June 3, 2018.

Lupita Jones crowned Andrea Toscano of Chihuahua at the end event. Toscano represented Mexico at the Miss Universe 2018 pageant, held in Thailand.

== Results ==
=== Placements ===
Color keys

- The contestant won in an International pageant.
- The contestant was a Finalist/Runner-up in an International pageant.
- The contestant was a Semi-Finalist in an International pageant.
- The contestant did not place.

Placement	Contestant	International Placement
Mexicana Universal 2018	Colima – Andrea Toscano	Unplaced – Miss Universe 2018
Mexicana Universal 2018	Colima – Andrea Toscano	1st Runner-up – Miss International 2019
1st Runner-Up	Tabasco – Aranza Molina	1st Runner-up – Reina Hispanoamericana 2018
2nd Runner-Up	Sinaloa – Mariely Leal	
3rd Runner-Up	Guerrero – Guadalupe Valero	2nd Runner-up – Nuestra Belleza Latina 2021
4th Runner-Up	Jalisco – Nebai Torres	Top 15 – Miss International 2018
5th Runner-Up	Zacatecas – Karely Sandoval	
Top 10	Michoacán - Leslie González; Puebla – Montserrat Curis; Veracruz – Martha María Briano; Yucatán – AnaPaola de Anda	
Top 16	Baja California Sur – Juliana Marinez; Coahuila – Priscilla Leal; Nuevo León – Andrea Merodio; Oaxaca – Yarith Cerón; Querétaro – Maria José Hernández; San Luis Potosí – Geraldine Machado	

== Contestants ==
32 contestants has been confirmed:

State	Contestant	Age	Height	Hometown
Aguascalientes	María Sareth Carranza Martin	19	1.80	Aguascalientes
Baja California	Belem Acevedo	25	1.69	Baja California
Baja California Sur	Juliana Martínez Camacho	18	1.77	Ciudad Constitución
Campeche	María de Jesús Rodríguez Toledo	21	1.70	Escárcega
Chiapas	Deborah Ozuna Rivera	23	1.73	Tuxtla Gutiérrez
(Chihuahua (state)) Chihuahua	Janneth Marleny Vargas Díaz	20	1.74	Chihuahua
Mexico City	Daniela Larraguivel Ortíz	23	1.68	Morelia
Coahuila	Priscila Leal	22	1.76	Ciudad Frontera
Colima	Andrea Isabel Toscano Ramírez	19	1.75	Manzanillo
Durango	Idaly Ayala Anaya	18	1.75	Guanacevi
State of Mexico	Martha Isabel Chávez López	23	1.70	Atizapán de Zaragoza
Guanajuato	Karla Marcela Marcochio Hernández	24	1.71	Irapuato
Guerrero	María Guadalupe Valero Catalán	22	1.68	Iguala
Jalisco	Nebai Torres Camarena	24	1.78	Guadalajara
Michoacán	Leslie González Villagomez	21	1.72	Apatzingán
Morelos	Valeria Gabriela Vélez Gutiérrez	24	1.71	Cuernavaca
Nayarit	Viridiana Zamora Mejía	22	1.80	Tuxpan
Nuevo León	Andrea Merodio Reyes	22	1.72	General Escobedo
Oaxaca	Sayra Yarith Cerón Enriquez	24	1.76	Oaxaca
Puebla	Montserrat Curis López	22	1.71	Puebla
Querétaro	María José Hernández Ledesma	25	1.75	Cadereyta de Montes
Quintana Roo	Eyra Daniela Leines Velasco	25	1.74	Cancún
San Luis Potosí	Geraldine Machado Argüelles	22	1.76	Ciudad Valles
Sinaloa	Maryely Leal Cervantes	21	1.78	Los Mochis
Sonora	Brenda Janeth Vargas Romero	24	1.76	Hermosillo
Tabasco	Aranza Molina Rueda	21	1.77	Macuspana
Tamaulipas	Rita Zulema Rodríguez Flores	20	1.75	Tampico
Tlaxcala	Jessica Juárez Márquez	22	1.72	Tlaxco
Veracruz	Martha Leticia Suárez Briano	25	1.74	Boca del Río
Yucatán	Anapaola De Anda Aviña	22	1.70	Tekax
Zacatecas	Karely Sandoval Aranda	19	1.81	Río Grande
