= Mexicana Universal 2019 =

2nd edition of Mexicana Universal

- Date: June 23, 2019
- Venue: Foro de TV Azteca, Ciudad de México, México
- Broadcaster: Azteca Uno; Azteca América; TV Azteca
- Entrants: 31
- Placements: 20
- Withdrawals: Campeche; Coahuila; Quintana Roo; Tlaxcala
- Winner: Sofía Aragón; Jalisco

Mexicana Universal 2019 was the second edition of the Mexicana Universal beauty pageant, formerly called Nuestra Belleza Mexico until 2017. Andrea Toscano of Colima crowned her successor Sofía Aragón of Jalisco at the end of the event. Later, in November 2020, Claudia Lozano of Nuevo León, replaced her as 1st Runner Up and take her place.

== Results ==
=== Placements ===
Color keys

- The contestant won in an International pageant.
- The contestant was a Finalist/Runner-up in an International pageant.
- The contestant was a Semi-Finalist in an International pageant.
- The contestant did not place.

Placement	Contestant	International Placement
Mexicana Universal 2019	Jalisco – Sofía Aragón	2nd Runner-Up – Miss Universe 2019
1st Runner-Up	Nuevo León – Claudia Lozano	
2nd Runner-Up	Yucatán – Maru Nava	
3rd Runner-Up	Colima – Ángela Delgado	
4th Runner-Up	Oaxaca – Cintya Avendaño	
5th Runner-Up	Chiapas – Ximena Torres	
Mexicana Internacional 2022	Nayarit – Yuridia Durán	Unplaced – Miss International 2022
Runner-Up/Suplente	Chihuahua – Marissa Navarro	
Mexicana Hispanoamericana 2019	Puebla – Regina Peredo	Winner – Reina Hispanoamericana 2019
Runner-Up/Suplente	Nayarit – Luz Ávila	
Top 20	Baja California – Paola Guerrero; Guanajuato – Carolina Gaona; Guerrero – Cristal Rodríguez; Michoacán – Diana Martínez; Morelos – Samantha Ortega; Querétaro – Carolina Martínez; San Luis Potosí – Aurora Mancilla; Sinaloa – Rubí Pérez; Tabasco – Raquel Romero; Veracruz – Miriam Carballo	

== Contestants ==
The following are the list of official candidates of Mexicana Universal 2019:

State	Delegate	Age	Height	Hometown
Aguascalientes	Martha Daniela Landín Camarillo	23	1.81 m (5 ft 11 1/2 in)	Aguascalientes City
Baja California	Hilda Paola Guerrero Serrano	25	1.70 m (5 ft 7 in)	Mexicali
Baja California Sur	Melissa Tiscareño Antuna	25	1.76 m (5 ft 9 1/2 in)	La Paz
Chiapas	Ximena Torres Ochoa	22	1.71 m (5 ft 7 1/2 in)	Tuxtla Gutiérrez
(Chihuahua (state)) Chihuahua	Marissa Angélica Navarro Meza	25	1.70 m (5 ft 7 in)	Ciudad Juárez
(Mexico City) Ciudad de México	Mirabai Schönburg Othon	21	1.70 m (5 ft 7 in)	Ciudad de México
Colima	Ángela Margarita Delgado Hernández	21	1.73 m (5 ft 8 in)	Tecomán
Durango	Wendolin Esmeralda Chávez Martínez	24	1.74 m (5 ft 8 1/2 in)	Santiago Papasquiaro
(State of Mexico) Estado de México	Arantza Ceceña Romero	22	1.71 m (5 ft 7 1/2 in)	Otzolotepec
Guanajuato	Ana Carolina Gaona Camarena	20	1.71 m (5 ft 7 1/2 in)	Irapuato
Guerrero	Cristal Ivete Rodríguez Urquiza	22	1.72 m (5 ft 7 1/2 in)	Cutzamala
(Hidalgo (state)) Hidalgo	Marili Vázquez Olguín	24	1.77 m (5 ft 9 1/2 in)	Ixmiquilpan
Jalisco	Sofia Montserrat Aragón Torres	25	1.74 m (5 ft 8 1/2 in)	Zapopan
Michoacán	Diana Martínez Lagunas	24	1.74 m (5 ft 8 1/2 in)	Nueva Italia
Morelos	Samantha Ortega Bahena	22	1.71 m (5 ft 7 1/2 in)	Cuernavaca
Nayarit	Yuridia del Carmen Peña Durán	20	1.74 m (5 ft 8 1/2 in)	Ahuacatlán
Nayarit	Luz Alejandra Ávila Varela	19	1.73 m (5 ft 8 in)	Tepic
Nuevo León	Claudia Lozano Domínguez	25	1.81 m (5 ft 11 1/2 in)	San Pedro Garza García
Oaxaca	Cintya Karen Avendaño Bamaca	20	1.79 m (5 ft 10 1/2 in)	Oaxaca
Puebla	Regina Peredo Gutiérrez	21	1.74 m (5 ft 8 1/2 in)	Puebla
Querétaro	Karla Sofía Duque Jáuregui	25	1.73 m (5 ft 8 in)	Querétaro
Querétaro	Carolina Martínez Orozco	25	1.80 m (5 ft 11 in)	Querétaro
San Luis Potosí	Aurora Mancilla Castro	24	1.73 m (5 ft 8 in)	San Luis Potosí City
Sinaloa	Carla Mariant Sánchez González	24	1.74 m (5 ft 8 1/2 in)	Mocorito
Sinaloa	Alejandra Rubí Pérez López	21	1.78 m (5 ft 10 in)	Culiacán
Sonora	Marcela Castillo Orduño	20	1.76 m (5 ft 9 1/2 in)	Hermosillo
Tabasco	Raquel Guadalupe Romero Hernández	23	1.75 m (5 ft 9 in)	Comalcalco
Tamaulipas	Diana Lucía Rivera de León	23	1.70 m (5 ft 7 in)	Tampico
Veracruz	Miriam Alejandra Carballo Gallardo	24	1.75 m (5 ft 9 in)	Boca del Río
Yucatán	María Eugenia Nava del Río	22	1.70 m (5 ft 7 in)	Mérida
Zacatecas	Itza Xunely Serna Salazar	23	1.69 m (5 ft 6 1/2 in)	Jalpa

== Notes ==
=== Withdrawals ===
- Campeche
- Coahuila
- Quintana Roo
- Tlaxcala

=== Dethroned ===
- Jalisco Dorothy Sutherland was dismissed as Mexicana Universal Jalisco for breach of contract and not showing up at the national contest rally in Mexico City.
