= Mexicana Universal =

National beauty pageant competition in Mexico

- Formation: 1994; 32 years ago
- Type: Beauty pageant
- Headquarters: Mexico City
- Location: Mexico
- Members: Miss Grand International; Miss International; Reina Hispanoamericana
- Official language: Spanish
- President: Lupita Jones
- Website: www.mexicanauniversal.com

The Mexicana Universal is a national beauty pageant in Mexico held annually since 2018, replacing the former pageant, Nuestra Belleza México, held since 1994. Currently, the pageant is responsible for selecting the country's delegates to Miss Grand International, Miss International and Reina Hispanoamericana. Since 2025, the winner of the pageant represents Mexico at Miss Grand International as Miss Grand Mexico.

The organization is directed by the nation's first Miss Universe titleholder, Lupita Jones (1991), who originally produced the pageant as Nuestra Belleza México in association with the Televisa TV network. In October 2017, the organization parted ways with Televisa, and found a new home for the pageant's broadcasting in rival network TV Azteca, rebranding the pageant due to televisa still owning the trademark, and changing the format.

The organization has produced two Miss Universe winners (2010, 2020), two Miss International winners (2007, 2009), and three Reina Hispanoamericana winners (2008, 2019, 2021).

== Contestants ==
Aspiring hopefuls, ranging from 18 to 27 years of age and a minimum height of 1.68 m (5 ft 6 in), must fulfill the organization's additional requirements and consequently vie in their respective state pageants for eligibility to participate in the national pageant. Contestants are permitted to compete for their sub-national beauty titles more than once. However, this can no longer be done once they have taken part in the national event. They may also choose to represent a different state, as long as they provide proof of having resided in it for at least the last twelve months before registration.

As of the year 2000's edition of the pageant, it is not uncommon for some states to have more than one delegate competing simultaneously. This occurs when non-winning hopefuls from select subdivisions are invited (designated) by the organization to partake in the nationwide competition, taking into consideration their potential, and to possibly make up for other states which may lack representation. Usually three or four are designated annually.

Once in the national concentration, the participants engage in various events and appearances prior to the crucial preliminary competition from which a number of semi-finalists are chosen, only to be announced during the final competition. Additionally, five special awards given through sub-challenges enable the recipients an automatic pass to the semi-finals. During the crowning night, the semi-finalists are evaluated by a panel of judges while vying in swimsuit and evening gown, with eliminations taking place after each of these rounds. The remaining contestants are subsequently interviewed, and the runners-up and winners are respectively announced at the conclusion of the Nuestra Belleza México telecast.

If any of the titleholders is unable to fulfill her duties, the next in turn, known as the suplente (substitute), assumes the right to represent the country abroad. The pageant is held a year prior to when the winners compete internationally, giving them sufficient time to prepare for their corresponding beauty events.

== Titleholders ==
Below are the names of the annual titleholders of Nuestra Belleza México/Mexicana Universal, the states they represented and the venue which played host to their crowning, in ascending order. Titleholders whose names appear highlighted went on to win a major international pageant. For further details, see the representatives at major international pageants section.

Color key

- : Ended as Winner
- : Ended as Runner-up
- : Ended as one of the Finalists or Semi-finalists

Year	Titleholder	State	Venue	Placement at International
Winner's Title is Mexicana Universal
2026	Pety Juárez	Sinaloa	Guadalajara, Jalisco	5th Runner-up
2025	Montserrat Villalba	Hidalgo	Mexico City	5th Runner-up
2024	No Pageant			
2023	Melissa Flores	Michoacán	Aguascalientes	
2022	Irma Miranda	Sonora	San Luis Potosí	
2021	Débora Hallal	Sinaloa	Appointed^{[a]}	
2020	Andrea Meza	Chihuahua	Juriquilla, Querétaro	Miss Universe 2020
2019	Sofía Aragón	Jalisco	Mexico City	2nd Runner-up
2018	Andrea Toscano	Colima	Mexico City	1st Runner-up
Until 2017 the Title was Nuestra Belleza México
2017	Denisse Franco	Sinaloa	Mexico City	
2016	Kristal Silva	Tamaulipas	Mexico City	Top 9
2015	No Pageant			
2014	Wendolly Esparza	Aguascalientes	Jojutla, Morelos	Top 15
2013	Josselyn Garciglia	Baja California	Toluca, State of Mexico	
2012	Cynthia Duque	Nuevo León	Tuxtla Gutiérrez, Chiapas	
2011	Karina González	Aguascalientes	Puerto Vallarta, Jalisco	Top 10
2010	Karin Ontiveros	Jalisco	Saltillo, Coahuila	
2009	Ximena Navarrete	Jalisco	Mérida, Yucatán	Miss Universe 2010
2008	Karla Carrillo	Jalisco	Monterrey, Nuevo León	
2007	Elisa Nájera	Guanajuato	Manzanillo, Colima	4th Runner-up
2006	Rosa María Ojeda	Sinaloa	Tampico, Tamaulipas	Top 10
2005	Priscila Perales	Nuevo León	Aguascalientes	Miss International 2007
2005	Priscila Perales	Nuevo León	Aguascalientes	Top 10
2004	Laura Elizondo	Tamaulipas	San Luis Potosí	3rd Runner-up
2003	Rosalva Luna	Sinaloa	Morelia, Michoacán	Top 15
2002	Marisol González	Coahuila	Boca del Río, Veracruz	
2001	Ericka Cruz	Yucatán	Toluca, State of Mexico	
2000	Jacqueline Bracamontes	Jalisco	Apizaco, Tlaxcala	
1999	Leticia Murray	Sonora	Pachuca, Hidalgo	Top 15
1998	Silvia Salgado	Nuevo León	Acapulco, Guerrero	Top 10
1997	Katty Fuentes	Nuevo León	Acapulco, Guerrero	
1996	Rebeca Tamez	Tamaulipas	Cancún, Quintana Roo	
1995	Vanessa Guzmán	Chihuahua	Toluca, State of Mexico	Top 6
1994	Luz María Zetina	State of Mexico	Zapopan, Jalisco	

^{a} Appointed; 1st Runner-Up at Mexicana Universal 2020

=== Mexican Miss Universe Winners ===
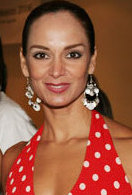
Señorita México 1990 and Miss Universe 1991
Lupita Jones,
Baja California

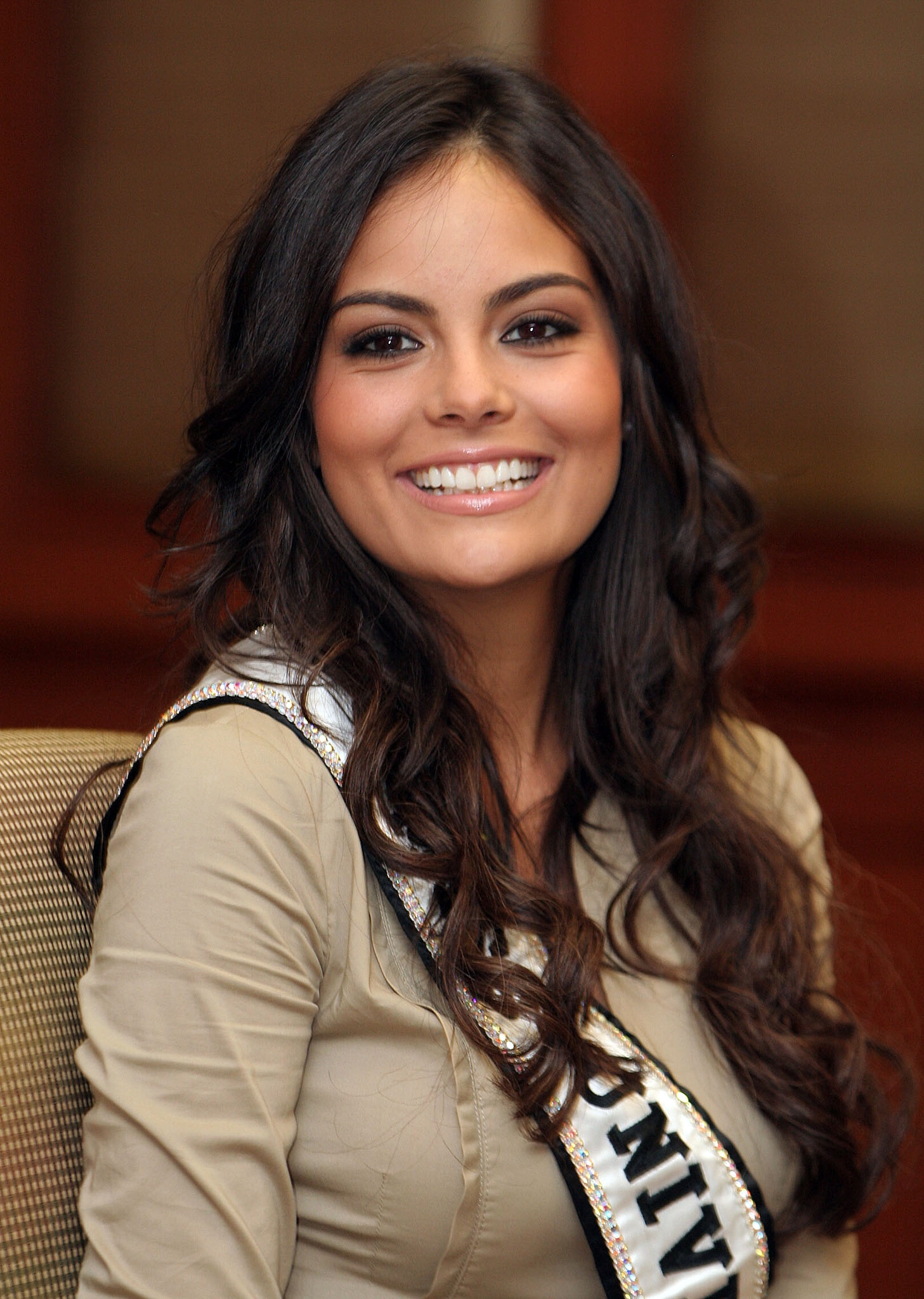
NB México 2009 and Miss Universe 2010
Ximena Navarrete,
Jalisco

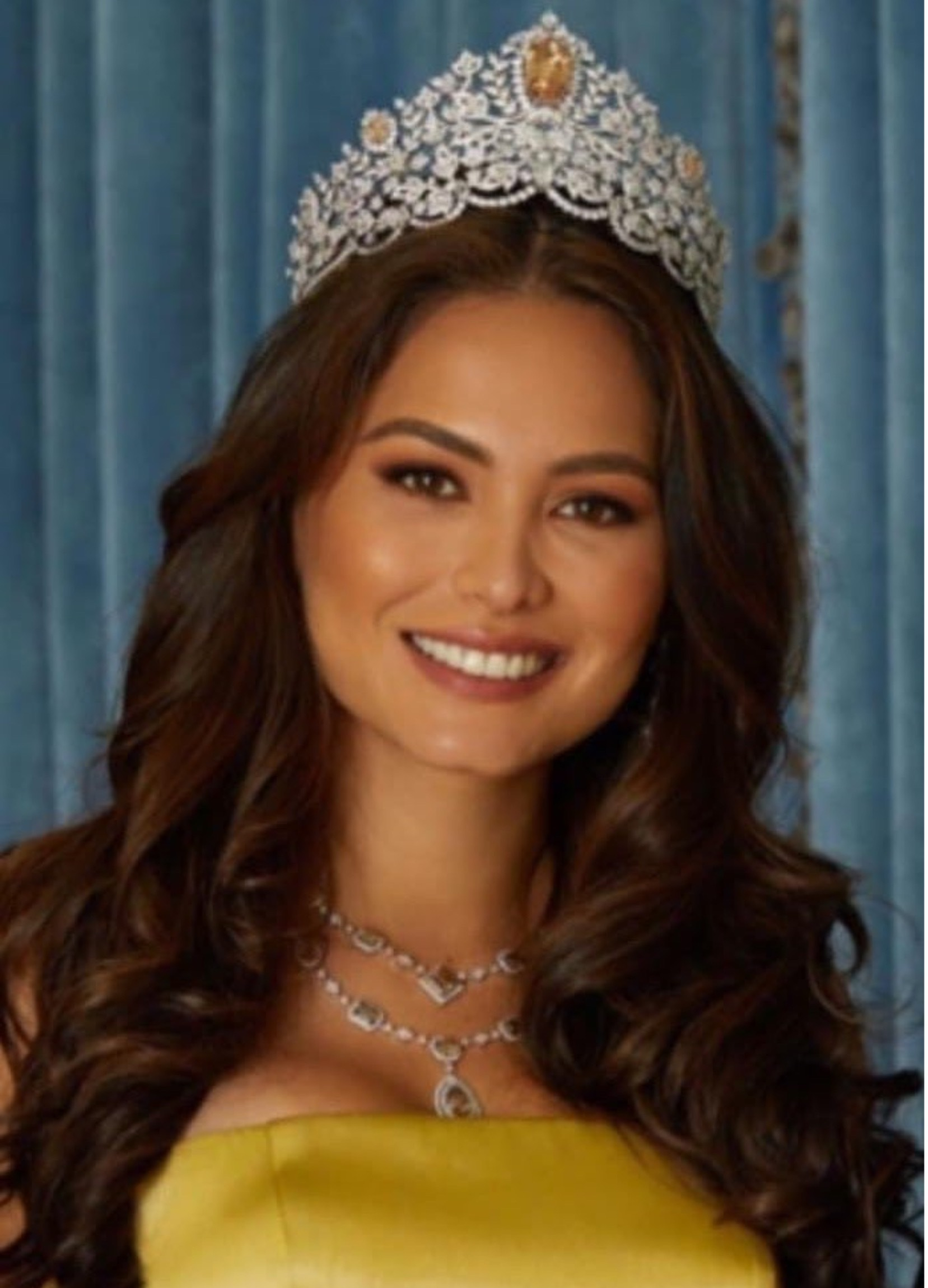
Mexicana Universal 2020 and Miss Universe 2020
Andrea Meza,
Chihuahua

== Representatives at major international pageants ==
Below are the names of the delegates enlisted by the Nuestra Belleza Mexico Organization to represent the country at major worldwide beauty contests. Keep in mind that they are listed according to the year in which they participated in their respective international pageants, which do not always coincide with when their national crowning took place, as explained in the last paragraph of the contestants section.

Color key

- : Declared as Winner
- : Ended as Runner-up or top 5/6 qualification
- : Ended as one of the Finalist/Semi-finalists
- : Unplaced but given Special award(s)

=== Miss Grand International ===
Year	Delegate	State	Competition performance	
Year	Delegate	State	Placements	Special award(s)
2026	Pety Juárez	Sinaloa	5th Runners-up	
2025	Montserrat Villalva	Hidalgo	5th Runners-up	Best Evening Gown
2024	Tania Estrada	Chihuahua	Top 20	

=== Miss International ===
Year	Delegate	State	Competition performance	
Year	Delegate	State	Placements	Special award(s)
2026	Valeria Espinoza	Colima	TBA	
2025	Natalia Garibay Valencia	Jalisco	Top 20	
2024	Valeria Villanueva López	Colima		Miss Photogenic
2023	Itzia Margarita García Jiménez	Colima	Top 7	People's Choice Award
2022	Yuridia del Carmen Durán Peña	Nayarit		
Due to the impact of COVID-19 pandemic, no competition held between 2020—2021
2019	Andrea Isabel Toscano Ramírez	Colima	1st Runner-up	
2018	Nebai Torres Camarena	Jalisco	Top 15	Miss Best Dresser
2017	Treisy Citlaly Higuera López	Tamaulipas		
2016	María Geraldine Ponce Méndez	Nayarit	Top 15	
2015	Lorena Marlene Sevilla Mesina	Colima	Top 10	
2014	Vianey Vázquez Ramírez	Aguascalientes	Top 10	
2013	Miroslava Montemayor García	Nuevo León		
2012	Jessica García Formenti	Baja California Sur	Top 15	
2011	Karen Alicia Higuera Contreras	Baja California Sur		Miss Friendship
2010	Gabriela Palacio Díaz de León	Aguascalientes		Miss Photogenic
2009	Anagabriela Espinoza Marroquín	Nuevo León	Miss International 2009	Miss Chengdu Glamor
2008	Lorenza Bernot Krauze	Morelos		
2007	Silvia Priscila Perales Elizondo	Nuevo León	Miss International 2007	
2000	Leticia Judith Murray Acedo	Sonora	Top 15	

=== Miss Universe ===
Year	Titleholder	State	Competition performance	
Year	Titleholder	State	Placements	Special award(s)
2023	Melissa Flores Godínez	Michoacán		
2022	Irma Cristina Miranda Valenzuela	Sonora		
2021	Débora Hallal Ayala	Sinaloa		
2020	Alma Andrea Meza Carmona	Chihuahua	Miss Universe 2020	
2019	Sofía Montserrat Aragón Torres	Jalisco	2nd Runner-up	
2018	Andrea Isabel Toscano Ramírez	Colima		
2017	Denisse Iridiane Franco Piña	Sinaloa		
2016	Yuselmi Kristal Silva Dávila	Tamaulipas	Top 9	
2015	Wendolly Esparza Delgadillo	Aguascalientes	Top 15	
2014	Josselyn Garciglia Bañuelos	Baja California Sur		
2013	Cynthia Lizeth Duque Garza	Nuevo León		
2012	Laura Karina González Muñoz	Aguascalientes	Top 10	
2011	Karin Cecilia Ontiveros Meza	Jalisco		
2010	Ximena Navarrete Rosete	Jalisco	Miss Universe 2010	
2009	Karla María Carrillo González	Jalisco		
2008	Elisa Nájera Gualito	Guanajuato	4th Runner-up	Best Swimsuit & Best Figure
2007	Rosa María Ojeda Cuen	Sinaloa	Top 10	
2006	Silvia Priscila Perales Elizondo	Nuevo León	Top 10	
2005	Laura Elizondo Erhard	Tamaulipas	3rd Runner-up	
2004	Rosalva Yazmín Luna Ruiz	Sinaloa	Top 15	
2003	Marisol González Casas	Coahuila		
2002	Ericka Yadira Cruz Escalante	Yucatán		
2001	Jacqueline Bracamontes	Jalisco		
2000	Leticia Judith Murray Acedo	Sonora		Best National Costume
1999	Silvia Salgado Cavazos	Nuevo León	Top 10	
1998	Katty Fuentes García	Nuevo León		Clairol Herbal Essences Style
1997	Rebeca Lynn Tamez Jones	Tamaulipas		
1996	Vanessa Guzmán Niebla	Chihuahua	Top 6	
1995	Luz María Zetina Lugo	Estado de México		

=== Miss World ===
Year	Delegate	State	Competition performance	
Year	Delegate	State	Placements	Special award(s)
2015	Yamelin Ramírez Cota	Sonora		
2014	Daniela Álvarez Reyes	Morelos	Top 10	
2013	María Elena Chagoya Triana	Veracruz		
2012	Mariana Berumen Reynoso	Guanajuato	Top 15	
2011	Gabriela Palacio Díaz de León	Aguascalientes		
2010	Anabel Solís Sosa	Yucatán		
2009	Perla Judith Beltrán Acosta	Sinaloa	1st Runner-up	Miss World Americas; Miss World Top Model
2008	Anagabriela Espinoza Marroquín	Nuevo León	Top 15	Miss World Beach Beauty
2007	Carolina Morán Gordillo	Colima	2nd Runner-up	Miss World Americas
2006	Karla Verónica Jiménez Amezcua	Puebla	Top 17	
2005	Dafne Molina Lona	Distrito Federal	1st Runner-up	Miss World Americas
2004	Yessica Ramírez Meza	Baja California	Top 15	Miss World Top Model
2003	Erika Honstein	Sonora		
2002	Blanca Zumárraga Contreras	Puebla		
2001	Tatiana Rodríguez Romero	Campeche		
2000	Paulina Flores Arias	Sinaloa		
1999	Danette Velasco Bataller	Distrito Federal		
1998	Vilma Verónica Zamora Suñol	Guanajuato		
1997	Blanca Delfina Soto Benavides	Morelos		
1996	Yessica Salazar González	Jalisco	Top 10	Spectacular Beach Wear
1995	Alejandra Aidee Quintero Velasco	Nuevo León	Top 10	

=== Replaced delegates ===
The Nuestra Belleza México contestants below were slated to participate in an international pageant, but were unable to go through with it for one reason or another. And thus, they were eventually replaced.

Year	Name	State	Did not compete in	Reason
2024	Tania Estrada	Chihuahua	Miss Charm 2024	Resigned
2011	Cynthia de la Vega	Nuevo León	Miss World 2011	Dethroned
2009	Laura Zúñiga	Sinaloa	Miss International 2009	Dethroned
2000	Jacqueline Bracamontes	Jalisco	Miss World 2000	Resigned
1999	Lynette Delgado	Sinaloa	Miss International 1999	Resigned

== State tally ==
Below is a table of the top rankings for the Nuestra Belleza Mexico pageant, of the thirty-two Mexican states, based on all results from the first event in 1994 to the most recent competition.

Rank	State	NB México MxU Universal until 2023	NB Mundo México until 2015	NB Internacional México MxU Internacional	Miss Charm Internacional México MxU Charm Internacional	Reina Hispanoamericana México MxU Hispanoamericana	Total
1	Jalisco	5	2^{[c]}	2			8
2	Nuevo León	4	2^{[a]}	3			9
3	Sinaloa	4	2	^{[b]}		^{[b]}	6
4	Tamaulipas	3		1		1	5
5	Aguascalientes	2	1	2		1	6
6	Sonora	1	2	1		2	6
7	Guanajuato	1	2			1	4
8	Colima	1	1	2			4
9	Yucatán	1	1			1	3
10	Baja California Sur	1		2			3
11	Michoacán	1				1	2
11	Chihuahua	1				1	2
12	Coahuila	1					1
12	Estado de México	1					1
13	Morelos		2	2			4
14	Ciudad de México		2		1	1	4
15	Puebla		2			1	3
16	Baja California		1			1	2
17	Campeche		1				1
17	Veracruz		1				1
18	Nayarit			2	1		3
19	San Luis Potosí				1		1
20	Tabasco					1	1
20	Oaxaca					1	1
20	Hidalgo					1	1

^{a} Cynthia de la Vega was dethroned, decreasing the number of Nuestra Belleza Mundo México titles for Nuevo León by one. The title was passed on to Gabriela Palacio of Aguascalientes.
^{b} Laura Zuñiga was dethroned, decreasing the number of Nuestra Belleza Internacional México titles for Sinaloa by one. The title was passed on to Anagabriela Espinoza of Nuevo León.
^{c} Jacqueline Bracamontes resigned her title after winning the main Nuestra Belleza México crown, decreasing the number of Nuestra Belleza Mundo México titles for Jalisco by one. The title was passed on to Paulina Flores.

== Delegates at other pageants ==
=== Reina Hispanoamericana ===
Year	Delegate	State	Competition performance	
Year	Delegate	State	Placements	Special award(s)
2026	Melissa Payró de la O	Yucatán	2nd Runner-up	
2025	Daniela Cardona Rosales	Ciudad de México	Top 12	
2023	Carolina Pérez Martínez	Sinaloa	Top 13	Fan Vote Choicely
2022	Diana Abigail Robles Rivera	Guanajuato	3rd Runner-up	
2021	Andrea Martínez Bazarte	Nuevo León	Reina Hispanoamericana 2021	Best Smile
2019	Regina Peredo Gutierrez	Puebla	Reina Hispanoamericana 2019	
2018	Aranza Anaid Molina Rueda	Tabasco	1st Runner-up	Miss Photogenic; Miss Elegance; Best Lips
2017	Karla María López Berumen	Aguascalientes	3rd Runner-up	
2016	Magdalena Chipres Herrera	Michoacán	Virreina Hispanoamericana 2016	Best National Costume
2015	Sandra Ahumada Treviño	Tamaulipas	Top 10	
2014	Vanessa López Quijada	Sonora	Virreina Hispanoamericana 2014	Miss Photogenic; Look Oster; Amazonas Girl
2013	Gabriela Prieto Díaz Infante	Chihuahua	3rd Runner-up	
2012	Jeraldine González Meza	Baja California		Miss Elegance
2011	Lili Marlene Rosales López	Hidalgo		
2010	Ángeles Aguilar del Puerto	Oaxaca		
2009	Andrea Martínez de Velasco	Guanajuato		Best National Costume
2008	Laura Elena Zúñiga Huizar	Sinaloa	Reina Hispanoamericana 2008 (dethroned)	
2007	Melissa Estrella Pérez	Sonora		Miss Friendship

=== Miss Charm ===
Year	Delegate	State	Competition performance	
Year	Delegate	State	Placements	Special award(s)
2025	Francia Cortés Sandoval	Nayarit	Top 5	
2024	Xiadani Saucedo Arrieta	Ciudad de México	Top 5	
2023	Ana Karen Bustos González	San Luis Potosí	Top 20	

=== Miss Continente Americano ===
Year	Delegate	State	Competition performance	
Year	Delegate	State	Placements	Special award(s)
2012	Karen Joselin Padilla Brizuela	Distrito Federal	5th Runner-up	Miss Photogenic
2011	Blanca Cecilia Montaño Moreno	Sonora	1st Runner-up	
2010	Karla María Carrillo González	Jalisco	1st Runner-up	
2009	Paulina Hernández Calderón	Baja California		
2008	María Guadalupe González Gallegos	Jalisco	Miss Continente Americano 2008	Miss Photogenic; Miss Yanbal Face
2007	Gladys Castellanos Jiménez	Jalisco	2nd Runner-up	
2006	Diana Karime Jiménez Pérez	Zacatecas		

=== Reina Internacional del Café ===
Year	Delegate	State	Competition performance	
Year	Delegate	State	Placements	Special award(s)
2008	Georgina Holguín Lozano	Chihuahua	Top 10	
2007	Monserrat Montagut Enciso	Chihuahua	2nd Runner-up	
2006	Daniela de Jesús Cosío	Baja California Sur	Top 10	
2004	Brisseida Moya Leal	Nuevo León		
2003	María Félix Espinoza	Sonora		
2002	Mónica Aragón Herrera	Tamaulipas		
2001	Eva Ruíz Torres	Zacatecas	Vice Queen	
2000	Hortensia Teruel Contreras	Nuevo León		
1999	Silvia Salgado Cavazos	Nuevo León		Best Face
1998	Karla Corral Salomón	Tabasco		

=== Miss Atlantic International ===
Year	Delegate	State	Competition performance	
Year	Delegate	State	Placements	Special award(s)
2007	Natalia Pérez Suárez	Morelos	1st Runner-up	Miss Photogenic
2004	Mónica Rodríguez	Chihuahua		
2003	Ofelia Chávez Moreno	Chihuahua		
2002	Claudia Collado Careaga	Sinaloa		
2000	Gmelina Coutiño Glovner	Chiapas		
1999	Solagne Rivera Astudillo	Quintana Roo		Best National Costume
1998	Katty Fuentes García	Nuevo León	1st Runner-up	Miss Elegance; Miss Congeniality

=== Miss Costa Maya Internacional ===
Year	Delegate	State	Competition performance	
Year	Delegate	State	Placements	Special award(s)
2002	Elsa Lucia Burgos Pérez	Nuevo León	Miss Costa Maya Internacional 2002	Best National Costume
2001	Evelyn Esther López Pacheco	Yucatán		
2000	Valeria de Anda González	Yucatán		
1999	Denisse Guzmán Virgen	Colima	Miss Costa Maya Internacional 1999	
1998	Bárbara Macossay Artega	Campeche		
1997	Tania Elizabeth Vásquez Pérez	Nayarit		
1996	Socorro Retolaza Ulloa	Veracruz	Miss Costa Maya Internacional 1996	

=== Nuestra Belleza Internacional ===
Year	Delegate	State	Competition performance	
Year	Delegate	State	Placements	Special award(s)
1995	Helen Amina Blancarte Tirado	Sinaloa	Nuestra Belleza Internacional 1995	

== See also ==
- Señorita México
- Miss Grand Mexico
- Miss Universe Mexico
- Miss Mexico Organization
- Mr World Mexico
- Miss Earth México
