= List of Mexico's Next Top Model contestants =

This is a list of contestants who have appeared on the Mexican television show Mexico's Next Top Model. Contestants compete against each other to become the next top Mexican top model. They are judged by model Jaydy Michel (Elsa Benítez in previous cycles) and her panel of judges, to win a modeling contract with a top modeling agency and along with other prizes. The series first aired in 2009 and as of 2014, there have been five cycles.

| Name | Age | Home state | Height | Rank | Cycle |
|---|---|---|---|---|---|
| Kathya Guadalupe Amor Rodríguez García | 19 | Sinaloa | 1.75 m (5 ft 9 in) | 13th | Cycle 1 |
| Yatzil Rubio | 22 | Mexico | 1.80 m (5 ft 11 in) | 12th | Cycle 1 |
| María Isabel "Isabel" Nieto | 22 | Sonora | 1.73 m (5 ft 8 in) | 11th | Cycle 1 |
| María Fernanda Sánchez | 20 | Mexico | 1.74 m (5 ft 8 1/2 in) | 10th | Cycle 1 |
| Ana Laura Cubas | 21 | Nuevo León | 1.72 m (5 ft 7 1/2 in) | 9th | Cycle 1 |
| Maria Silvia "Silvia" Loyola Ugalde | 19 | Mexico City | 1.70 m (5 ft 7 in) | 8th | Cycle 1 |
| Anelis Echegaray | 23 | Morelos | 1.72 m (5 ft 7 1/2 in) | 7th | Cycle 1 |
| Verónica Sánchez Alonso | 18 | San Luis Potosí | 1.79 m (5 ft 10 1/2 in) | 6th | Cycle 1 |
| Andrea Carrión Gutierrez | 20 | Jalisco | 1.71 m (5 ft 7 1/2 in) | 5th | Cycle 1 |
| Paulina Haro Segura | 24 | Nuevo León | 1.73 m (5 ft 8 in) | 4th | Cycle 1 |
| Cecilia Pérez Delgadillo | 21 | San Luis Potosí | 1.77 m (5 ft 9 1/2 in) | 3rd | Cycle 1 |
| Nohemí Hermosillo Villalobos | 18 | Jalisco | 1.71 m (5 ft 7 1/2 in) | Runner-up | Cycle 1 |
| Mariana Bayón Pérez | 18 | Coahuila | 1.78 m (5 ft 10 in) | Winner | Cycle 1 |
| Priscila "Pris" Zamora Balderrama | 27 | Sinaloa | 1.73 m (5 ft 8 in) | 14th | Cycle 2 |
| Silvia Verónica "Verónica" Sánchez | 18 | Mexico City | 1.71 m (5 ft 7 1/2 in) | 13th (quit) | Cycle 2 |
| Marina Isabel Ávila Victoria | 25 | Guanajuato | 1.73 m (5 ft 8 in) | 12th | Cycle 2 |
| Xareni Carolina Sajaropulos | 24 | Mexico City | 1.75 m (5 ft 9 in) | 11th | Cycle 2 |
| Ana Claudia Reyes Armas | 22 | Michoacán | 1.74 m (5 ft 8 1/2 in) | 10th | Cycle 2 |
| Lucero Quetzalli "Quetzalli" Bulnes | 23 | Mexico City | 1.70 m (5 ft 7 in) | 9th | Cycle 2 |
| Erika Itzel Coronel | 21 | Morelos | 1.76 m (5 ft 9 1/2 in) | 8th/7th | Cycle 2 |
| Grecia Vargas de Santiago | 20 | Nayarit | 1.82 m (5 ft 11 1/2 in) | 8th/7th | Cycle 2 |
| Melina Isabelle Laporta Castro | 20 | Quintana Roo | 1.74 m (5 ft 8 1/2 in) | 6th | Cycle 2 |
| Hilda Lizeth "Lee" Velázquez | 24 | Sonora | 1.73 m (5 ft 8 in) | 5th | Cycle 2 |
| María Fernanda "Fer" Herrera Espraza | 20 | Chihuahua | 1.78 m (5 ft 10 in) | 4th | Cycle 2 |
| Yael Aurora Álvarez Arroyo | 25 | Mexico City | 1.73 m (5 ft 8 in) | 3rd | Cycle 2 |
| Nikoll Suset Vogas Reynoso | 20 | Jalisco | 1.72 m (5 ft 7 1/2 in) | Runner-up | Cycle 2 |
| Tracy Ariel Reuss | 20 | Durango | 1.73 m (5 ft 8 in) | Winner | Cycle 2 |
| Amira del Carmen Díaz Olaldez | 19 | Veracruz | 1.76 m (5 ft 9 1/2 in) | 13th | Cycle 3 |
| Lilia 'Lili' Dorotea Fifield Sánchez | 22 | Baja California | 1.77 m (5 ft 9 1/2 in) | 12th | Cycle 3 |
| Leticia "Leti" Ortíz Zapatera | 20 | Puebla | 1.77 m (5 ft 9 1/2 in) | 11th | Cycle 3 |
| Analí Ramos Pérez | 22 | Chihuahua | 1.73 m (5 ft 8 in) | 10th | Cycle 3 |
| Eloina Cavazos Vallejo | 22 | Nuevo León | 1.77 m (5 ft 9 1/2 in) | 9th | Cycle 3 |
| Ana Paula Crippa Méndez | 20 | Veracruz | 1.71 m (5 ft 7 1/2 in) | 8th | Cycle 3 |
| Sue Ellen Belinda Garcia Salinas | 21 | Nuevo León | 1.71 m (5 ft 7 1/2 in) | 7th | Cycle 3 |
| Jessica Ortíz Palma | 20 | Yucatán | 1.71 m (5 ft 7 1/2 in) | 6th | Cycle 3 |
| Sofía Saviano García | 19 | Coahuila | 1.78 m (5 ft 10 in) | 5th | Cycle 3 |
| Perla Gaspar Valdéz | 18 | Sonora | 1.70 m (5 ft 7 in) | 4th | Cycle 3 |
| Alessandra "Alessa" Bravo Agredano | 19 | Jalisco | 1.69 m (5 ft 6 1/2 in) | 3rd | Cycle 3 |
| Paulina Barragán Morales | 24 | Jalisco | 1.76 m (5 ft 9 1/2 in) | Runner-up | Cycle 3 |
| Sahily Vianey Cordova Madrid | 18 | Sonora | 1.76 m (5 ft 9 1/2 in) | Winner | Cycle 3 |
| Laura Jonnuem "Jonnuem" Curiel Torres | 18 | Mexico City | 1.77 m (5 ft 9 1/2 in) | 14th | Cycle 4 |
| Alejandra "Ruz" Ruz | 19 | Jalisco | 1.75 m (5 ft 9 in) | 13th | Cycle 4 |
| Lucía de la Vega Verano | 19 | Quintana Roo | 1.70 m (5 ft 7 in) | 12th | Cycle 4 |
| Valeria Carmona | 18 | Chihuahua | 1.73 m (5 ft 8 in) | 11th | Cycle 4 |
| Hilda Margarita "Magui" Jiménez Aguirre | 21 | Guanajuato | 1.78 m (5 ft 10 in) | 10th | Cycle 4 |
| Stefanía "Stefy" Vargas Ambriz | 18 | Colima | 1.73 m (5 ft 8 in) | 9th | Cycle 4 |
| Renata Aguilar Arana | 19 | Mexico City | 1.73 m (5 ft 8 in) | 8th | Cycle 4 |
| Karely Carreón | 18 | Nuevo León | 1.77 m (5 ft 9 1/2 in) | 7th (quit) | Cycle 4 |
| Mechelle "Michel" Estrada Rodeles | 18 | Sonora | 1.74 m (5 ft 8 1/2 in) | 6th | Cycle 4 |
| Clara de Asís González Padilla | 22 | Jalisco | 1.75 m (5 ft 9 in) | 5th | Cycle 4 |
| Bárbara Cogua Cortéz Guajardo | 21 | Nuevo León | 1.78 m (5 ft 10 in) | 4th | Cycle 4 |
| Dina Iliana "Iliana" Ruiz | 18 | Sonora | 1.76 m (5 ft 9 1/2 in) | 3rd | Cycle 4 |
| Cindy Nayeli Gradilla | 19 | Jalisco | 1.75 m (5 ft 9 in) | Runner-up | Cycle 4 |
| Paloma Aguilar Valencia | 18 | Sonora | 1.77 m (5 ft 9 1/2 in) | Winner | Cycle 4 |
| Nydia Galindo Salas | 23 | Puebla | 1.80 m (5 ft 11 in) | 13th | Cycle 5 |
| Montserrat Curis López | 18 | Puebla | 1.70 m (5 ft 7 in) | 12th | Cycle 5 |
| Diana Gill | 22 | Sinaloa | 1.75 m (5 ft 9 in) | 11th | Cycle 5 |
| Samantha Ochoa | 22 | Aguascalientes | 1.77 m (5 ft 9 1/2 in) | 10th | Cycle 5 |
| Andrea Ibáñez Farga | 22 | Puebla | 1.73 m (5 ft 8 in) | 9th | Cycle 5 |
| Elsa Cecilia Chapa Rodríguez | 23 | Nuevo León | 1.75 m (5 ft 9 in) | 8th | Cycle 5 |
| Elisa Ayon Garcia | 18 | Sonora | 1.75 m (5 ft 9 in) | 7th | Cycle 5 |
| Kristen Fara | 18 | Chihuahua | 1.74 m (5 ft 8 1/2 in) | 6th (quit) | Cycle 5 |
| Roxana Reyes Herrera | 21 | Zacatecas | 1.76 m (5 ft 9 1/2 in) | 5th/4th | Cycle 5 |
| Nebai Torres Camarena | 21 | Jalisco | 1.76 m (5 ft 9 1/2 in) | 5th/4th | Cycle 5 |
| Karen Miranda "Miranda" Chamosa | 20 | Mexico | 1.74 m (5 ft 8 1/2 in) | 3rd | Cycle 5 |
| Mariana Angelli Berumen Reynoso | 22 | Jalisco | 1.78 m (5 ft 10 in) | Runner-up | Cycle 5 |
| Silvia Vanessa "Vanessa" Ponce de León Sánchez | 22 | Mexico City | 1.72 m (5 ft 7 1/2 in) | Winner | Cycle 5 |
