= Nuestra Belleza México 2014 =

21st edition of Nuestra Belleza México beauty pageant

- Date: October 25, 2014
- Presenters: Ximena Navarrete, Alan Tacher
- Entertainment: Alex Midi, Maite Perroni, Alexander Acha
- Venue: Jardines de México, Jojutla, Morelos
- Broadcaster: Televisa
- Entrants: 32
- Placements: 15
- Withdrawals: Campeche, Guerrero
- Returns: Zacatecas
- Winner: Wendolly Esparza; Aguascalientes

Nuestra Belleza México 2014, the 21st annual Nuestra Belleza México beauty pageant, was held at the Jardines de México in Jojutla, Morelos, Mexico on October 25, 2014. Thirty-two contestants of the Mexican Republic competed for the national title, which was won by Wendolly Esparza from Aguascalientes who later competed in Miss Universe 2015 in the United States, where she was a semifinalist in the Top 15. Esparza was crowned by outgoing Nuestra Belleza México titleholder Josselyn Garciglia. She is the second Hidrocálida to win this title.

The Nuestra Belleza Mundo México title was won by Yamelin Ramírez from Sonora who later competed in Miss World 2015 in China. Ramírez was crowned by outgoing Nuestra Belleza Mundo México titleholder Daniela Álvarez. She is the second Sonorense to win this title, also was the last Nuestra Belleza Mundo México titleholder before the Nuestra Belleza México Organization lost the Miss World franchise.

For the third consecutive time and for the seventh time in the history of the pageant, two separate events were held to select the two winners for the titles Nuestra Belleza México and Nuestra Belleza Mundo México.

This year, nobody was recognized with the "Corona al Mérito 2014".

== Results ==
=== Placements ===
Placement	Contestant
Nuestra Belleza México 2014	Aguascalientes – Wendolly Esparza
1st Runner-Up	Jalisco – Karina Martin
2nd Runner-Up	Jalisco – Alessa Bravo
3rd Runner-Up	Colima – Lorena Sevilla
4th Runner-Up	Tamaulipas – Sandra Ahumada
Top 10	Distrito Federal – María Fernanda Garduño; Nuevo León – Alejandra Medina; Puebla – Fernanda Pulido; Tlaxcala – Samantha González-Rubio; Yucatán – Renata Rábago
Top 15	Baja California – Gabriela Bibayoff; Chiapas – Fernanda Córdova; Chihuahua – Yaritza Castillo; Morelos – Mariela Sanders; Sinaloa – Kynue Mascareño

=== Nuestra Belleza Mundo México ===
Two days before the final competition was held, the semi-final competition featured a live show entitled "Nuestra Belleza Mundo Mexico", in which it was announced that the winner of the Nuestra Belleza Mundo México title was Yamelin Ramírez from Sonora, who went on to represent Mexico in Miss World 2015. All contestants competed in swimsuit and evening gown categories during the contest.

The Nuestra Belleza Mundo México pageant was held at the Jardines de México in Jojutla, Morelos, Mexico on October 23, 2014 and was hosted by Luz Elena González and David Zepeda. It was the 7th edition of the "Nuestra Belleza Mundo México" contest and as an official separate pageant to choose Mexico's representative to Miss World. The winner of this event did not compete in the final night competition.

Placement	Contestant	International Placement
Nuestra Belleza Mundo México 2014	Sonora – Yamelin Ramírez	
1st Runner-Up	Jalisco – Alessa Bravo	
Top 5	Puebla – Fernanda Pulido; Sinaloa – Kynue Mascareño; Tamaulipas – Sandra Ahumada	

== Contestants ==
State	Contestant	Age	Height	Hometown
Aguascalientes	Wendolly Esparza Delgadillo	22	1.73	Aguascalientes City
Baja California	María Gabriela Bibayoff Ureña	20	1.79	Ensenada
Baja California Sur	Adela Isela Cázarez Bojórquez	21	1.72	Cabo San Lucas
Chiapas	María Fernanda Córdova Carrillo	23	1.71	Tapachula
(Chihuahua (state)) Chihuahua	Yaritza Anahí Castillo Loera	20	1.75	Cuauhtémoc
Colima	Lorena Marlene Sevilla Mesina	23	1.76	Colima
Coahuila	Ángela del Carmen Del Río Moncayo	21	1.73	Torreón
(Mexico City) Distrito Federal	María Fernanda Garduño Vázquez	18	1.73	Mexico City
Durango	Gisela Yeraldi Barraza Barraza	21	1.70	Durango
(State of Mexico) Estado de México	Lizbeth Bravo Gutiérrez	20	1.72	Cuautitlán Izcalli
(State of Mexico) Estado de México	Vanessa Acero Jaimes	22	1.75	Huixquilucan
Guanajuato	Hilda Margarita Jiménez Aguirre	22	1.78	León
(Hidalgo (state)) Hidalgo	Orianna Barrera Alarcón	20	1.70	Pachuca
Jalisco	Alessa Bravo Agredaño	21	1.72	Guadalajara
Jalisco	Karina Stephania Martín Jiménez	23	1.74	Tonalá
Michoacán	Michelle Anaid Garibay Cocco	19	1.70	Morelia
Morelos	Claudia Mariela Sanders Ibarrola	21	1.69	Cuernavaca
Nayarit	Xitlali Anaid López Hernández	22	1.74	San Blas
Nuevo León	Alejandra Monserrat Medina Casas	22	1.74	Monterrey
Oaxaca	Nayra Garibo González	20	1.72	Tuxtepec
Puebla	Fernanda Pulido Díaz Mercado	20	1.72	Puebla
Querétaro	Karen Guadalupe Saldaña Sandoval	19	1.69	Querétaro
San Luis Potosí	Azucena Moro Viveros	19	1.70	San Luis Potosí City
Sinaloa	Stefy Unzueta Cázares	19	1.75	Navolato
Sinaloa	Kynué Mascareño Lugo	23	1.74	Guamúchil
Sonora	Yamelin Ramírez Cota	21	1.72	Navojoa
Tabasco	María José Taboada Rodríguez	18	1.75	Emiliano Zapata
Tamaulipas	Sandra Ahumada Treviño	21	1.78	Tampico
Tlaxcala	Samantha Gutiérrez González-Rubio	23	1.74	Tlaxcala
Veracruz	Zara Lorena Ichante Sosa	22	1.70	Poza Rica
Yucatán	Renata Rábago Domínguez	23	1.74	Mérida
Zacatecas	Marleth Geraldine Pinedo Domínguez	20	1.71	Fresnillo

== Designates ==
- State of Mexico – Vanessa Acero
- Jalisco – Karina Martín
- Sinaloa – Kynué Mascareño

== Returning states ==
- Last competed in 2012:
  - Zacatecas

== Withdrawals ==
- Campeche
- Guerrero – Estephany García resigned to compete for personal reasons.
