= Mexico's Next Top Model season 2 =

Mexico's Next Top Model
- Season 2
- Judges: Elsa Benítez; Allan Fis; Jo Lance; Glenda Reyna
- No. of contestants: 14
- Winner: Tracy Reuss
- No. of episodes: 13

Release
- Original network: Sony Entertainment Television
- Original release: 9 August – 1 November 2011

Season chronology
- ← Previous; Season 1 Next → Season 3

Season two of Mexico's Next Top Model, the Mexican adaptation of Tyra Banks' America's Next Top Model, aired on Sony Entertainment Television from August 9 to November 1 2011. The show was hosted by Mexican model Elsa Benítez, with the judging panel of the previous season remaining unchanged.

The prize package for this season included a US$100,000 contract with Shock Modeling management, a cover feature and an editorial spread in Elle magazine, replacing the show's previous magazine, Glamour, and brand new Nissan.

The winner of the competition was 20-year-old Tracy Reuss from Gómez Palacio, Durango.

== Cast ==
=== Contestants ===
(Ages stated are at start of contest)

| Contestant | Age | Height | Hometown | Finish | Place |
|---|---|---|---|---|---|
| Priscila 'Pris' Zamora | 27 | 1.73 m (5 ft 8 in) | Los Mochis | Episode 2 | 14 |
| Verónica Sánchez | 18 | 1.70 m (5 ft 7 in) | Mexico City | Episode 3 | 13 (quit) |
| Marina Avila | 25 | 1.73 m (5 ft 8 in) | León | Episode 4 | 12 |
| Xareni Sajarópulous | 24 | 1.75 m (5 ft 9 in) | Mexico City | Episode 5 | 11 |
| Ana Claudia Armas | 22 | 1.74 m (5 ft 8 1/2 in) | Zamora | Episode 6 | 10 |
| Lucero 'Quetzalli' Bulnes | 23 | 1.70 m (5 ft 7 in) | Mexico City | Episode 7 | 9 |
| Grecia Vargas | 20 | 1.82 m (5 ft 11 1/2 in) | Tepic | Episode 8 | 8–7 |
| Erika Coronel | 21 | 1.76 m (5 ft 9 1/2 in) | Cuernavaca | Episode 8 | 8–7 |
| Melina Laporta | 20 | 1.74 m (5 ft 8 1/2 in) | Cozumel | Episode 9 | 6 |
| Hilda 'Lee' Velázquez | 24 | 1.73 m (5 ft 8 in) | Hermosillo | Episode 10 | 5 |
| Maria Fernanda 'Fer' Herrera | 20 | 1.78 m (5 ft 10 in) | Chihuahua City | Episode 11 | 4 |
| Yael Álvarez | 25 | 1.73 m (5 ft 8 in) | Mexico City | Episode 12 | 3 |
| Nikoll Vogas | 20 | 1.72 m (5 ft 7 1/2 in) | Guadalajara | Episode 12 | 2 |
| Tracy Reuss | 20 | 1.73 m (5 ft 8 in) | Gómez Palacio | Episode 12 | 1 |

=== Judges ===
- Elsa Benítez (host)
- Allan Fis
- Jo Lance
- Glenda Reyna

=== Other cast members ===
- Oscar Madrazo - creative director

== Episodes ==
| No. overall | No. in season | Title | Original release date |
|---|---|---|---|
| 13 | 1 | "Episode 1" | 9 August 2011 |
The 20 chosen semi-finalists met the judges for interviews during casting, and after the first elimination, the remaining contestants had a photo shoot wearing the same red dress. At the end of the episode, the judges selected the final 14 contestants.
| 14 | 2 | "Episode 2" | 16 August 2011 |
The contestants moved into their new home and had a makeup challenge, won by Tracy, before attending a casting for a beauty feature in Elle magazine, where Nikoll was chosen as the winner. Later, the models were photographed wearing colorful swimwear inside of a light box. At elimination, Priscila became the first contestant to leave the competition.: Featured photographer: Zony Maya; Special guests: Yetli, Pavel Marrero, Chamo, Paulina Soto, Sara Galindo
| 15 | 3 | "Episode 3" | 23 August 2011 |
The remaining contestants received makeovers, and had a pep talk with host Elsa Benítez on embracing their new looks. They later had a photo shoot with photographer Anairam, where they had to portray butterflies blooming out of colorful cellophane. At elimination, Ana Claudia was eliminated when she landed in the bottom two with Xareni. However, Verónica quit the competition and Ana Claudia was allowed to stay.: Featured photographer: Anairam; Special guests: Gustavo García-Villa, Carlota de la Vega
| 16 | 4 | "Episode 4" | 30 August 2011 |
The contestants received a catwalk lesson from runway coach Dinorah Cetina in preparation for the upcoming challenge, a slippery runway show for designer Kris Goyri at the Revolution Monument, where Ana Claudia was chosen as the winner. They later took part in a nude photo shoot shot by photographer Adrian Burns, and met the judges for elimination at panel, where Marina became the third contestant to leave the competition.: Featured photographer: Adrian Burns; Special guests: Dinorah Cetina, Kris Goyri
| 17 | 5 | "Episode 5" | 6 September 2011 |
The contestants had a styling challenge at Sears where they were asked to dress themselves based on different themes, where Yael was chosen as the winner. The models were later photographed on a rotating platform wearing high end designs for the week's photo shoot. At elimination, Xareni became the fourth contestant to leave the competition, after which host Elsa Benítez announced that a double elimination would be taking place sometime in the coming weeks.: Featured photographer: Santiago Ruiseñor; Special guests: Edgar Smolensky, Gianfranco Reni
| 18 | 6 | "Episode 6" | 13 September 2011 |
The contestants had a pole dancing lesson with instructor Johanna Lovera, where Melina was deemed to be the best performer. They later had a challenge with actor Gonzalo García Vivanco in which they had to get his attention through the art of seduction, which was won by Yael, and had a romantic photo shoot with a male model for the new Nissan. At elimination, Ana Claudia became the fifth contestant to leave the competition.: Featured photographer: Greg Allen; Special guests: Johanna Lovera, Gonzalo García Vivanco
| 19 | 7 | "Episode 7" | 20 September 2011 |
The remaining contestants had a mock interview challenge with model Paulina Flores in which Erika was deemed to be the best performer. They later attended an a-list gala where they were interviewed by E! News presenter John Paul Ospina and season 1 winner Mariana Bayón for a challenge, which was won by Lee. The models then had to embody different model stereotypes in a photo shoot with photographer Óscar Turco. At elimination, Quetzalli became the sixth contestant to leave the competition.: Featured photographer: Óscar Turco; Special guests: Paulina Flores, Daniela Rodriguez, Pamela Ocampo, Mariana Bayón, John Paul Ospina, Gabriel Ibarzábal, Carlota de la Vega
| 20 | 8 | "Episode 8" | 27 September 2011 |
The contestants celebrated their progress in the competition before participating in runway challenge for designer Natalie Amkie across Paseo de la Reforma during traffic, where Tracy was chosen as the best performer. They later had to pose underwater for the week's photo shoot. At panel, Erika and Grecia landed in the bottom two, and left the competition in a double elimination.: Featured photographer: David Torres; Special guests: Natalie Amkie, Dinorah Cetina, Anna Fusoni
| 21 | 9 | "Episode 9" | 4 October 2011 |
The remaining contestants were taken to Teatro Fru Fru, where they met Óscar Madrazo and Mexican director Gustavo Loza for an acting lesson. They later had a challenge with actor Mauricio Islas, in which Melina was deemed to be the best performer, and had to shoot a commercial for Sedal's Co-Creations shampoo. At elimination, Melina became ninth contestant to leave the competition.: Featured director: Chava Cartas; Special guests: Gustavo Loza, Mauricio Islas
| 22 | 10 | "Episode 10" | 11 October 2011 |
The contestants had go sees with designers around the city, and were given a four-hour time limit to complete the challenge, at the end of which Nikoll was chosen as the winner. They were later photographed wearing couture gowns at an antique mansion before meeting with the judges for elimination, where Lee became the tenth contestant to leave the competition.: Featured photographer: Fabiola Zamora; Special guests: Carla Fernández, Josette Carbajal, Daniel Espinosa, Sara Galindo
| 23 | 11 | "Episode 11" | 18 October 2011 |
The contestants traveled to San Miguel de Allende, and after a sight-seeing tour of the city, were introduced to former model Soraya González for a posing lesson and challenge, which was won by Nikoll. At the end of the week, the models were photographed at the Empalme Escobedo train station, where they had to pose as gypsies. At panel, Fer became the eleventh contestant to be eliminated from the competition, leaving Nikoll, Tracy, and Yael as the three remaining finalists.: Featured photographer: David Franco; Special guests: Soraya González
| 24 | 12 | "Episode 12" | 25 October 2011 |
This episode recapped the entire season up to the selection of the final three, and showed previously unaired footage for the first time.
| 25 | 13 | "Episode 13" | 1 November 2011 |
The final three had to shoot a second commercial for Sedal in one take, and later had a mock photo shoot for the cover of Elle magazine, for which Yael was later eliminated. The remaining two contestants, Nikoll and Tracy, took part in a final runway show for Alejandro Carlín alongside previously eliminated contestants, and met Top Model creator Tyra Banks, who served as the season's final guest judge for the final deliberation. After the judges reviewed each of the finalists' body of work throughout the competition, Tracy was crowned as the second winner of Mexico's Next Top Model.: Featured director: Bernardo Serna; Featured photographer: Tito Trueba; Special guests: Ernesto Moncada, Tyra Banks

== Results ==
| Order | Episodes | | | | | | | | | | | | |
| Order | 1 (Note: In episode 1, the group of 20 semi-finalists was reduced to 14 contestants.) | 2 | 3 (Note: In episode 3, Verónica's decision to quit at panel automatically saved Ana Claudia from elimination .) | 4 | 5 | 6 | 7 | 8 (Note: In episode 8, Erika and Grecia were both eliminated while in the bottom two.) | 9 | 10 | 11 | 13 | |
|---|---|---|---|---|---|---|---|---|---|---|---|---|---|
| 1 | Lee | Tracy | Melina | Nikoll | Yael | Lee | Fer | Tracy | Yael | Tracy | Nikoll | Nikoll | Tracy |
| 2 | Tracy | Erika | Lee | Yael | Lee | Erika | Grecia | Melina | Nikoll | Fer | Tracy | Tracy | Nikoll |
| 3 | Erika | Lee | Nikoll | Fer | Melina | Grecia | Nikoll | Nikoll | Tracy | Yael | Yael | Yael | |
| 4 | Grecia | Nikoll | Tracy | Erika | Grecia | Fer | Lee | Yael | Fer | Nikoll | Fer | | |
| 5 | Nikoll | Verónica | Verónica | Lee | Quetzalli | Quetzalli | Melina | Lee | Lee | Lee | | | |
| 6 | Fer | Grecia | Erika | Ana Claudia | Nikoll | Yael | Erika | Fer | Melina | | | | |
| 7 | Pris | Quetzalli | Marina | Quetzalli | Erika | Tracy | Yael | Erika; Grecia | | | | | |
| 8 | Yael | Marina | Grecia | Melina | Fer | Nikoll | Tracy | Erika; Grecia | | | | | |
| 9 | Verónica | Fer | Quetzalli | Tracy | Ana Claudia | Melina | Quetzalli | | | | | | |
| 10 | Melina | Xareni | Fer | Xareni | Tracy | Ana Claudia | | | | | | | |
| 11 | Marina | Ana Claudia | Yael | Grecia | Xareni | | | | | | | | |
| 12 | Xareni | Yael | Xareni | Marina | | | | | | | | | |
| 13 | Ana Claudia | Melina | Ana Claudia | | | | | | | | | | |
| 14 | Quetzalli | Pris | | | | | | | | | | | |

The contestant was eliminated
The contestant quit the competition
The contestant was eliminated but allowed to remain in the competition
The contestant won the competition
