= Miss Earth Nuevo León =

- Formation: 2001
- Type: Beauty Pageant
- Headquarters: Monterrey
- Location: Mexico
- Local Coordinator: Roberto Salazar López

Miss Earth Nuevo León is a state-level contest in the state of Nuevo León, Mexico, which selects the state representative for the national contest Miss Earth México, thus aspiring to represent the country internationally on one of the platforms offered.

The state organization has achieved the following results since 2007:

- Miss Earth México-Fire: 2 (2018, 2021)
- Top 8/10: 1 (2015, 2023)
- Top 16/20: 2 (2016)
- Unplaced: 3 (2009, 2010, 2011, 2012, 2013, 2014, 2017, 2019, 2024)

== International Queens ==
- Sugheidy Willie - Reina Internacional del Trópico 2016

== National Queens ==
- Gloria Cano - Miss Earth México-Fire 2021
- Paola Tanguma - Miss Earth México-Fire2018

== Titleholders ==
The following are the names of the annual winners of Miss Earth Nuevo León, listed in ascending order, as well as their results during the national Miss Earth México pageant. State queens who represented the country in a current or past franchise of the national organization are also highlighted in a specific color.

Current Franchises:

- Competed at Miss Earth.
- Competed at Miss Eco International.
- Competed at The Miss Globe.
- Competed at Miss Freedom of the World.
- Competed at Miss Panamerican International.
- Competed at Miss Polo International.
- Competed at Reina Mundial de la Piña.

Former Franchises:

- Competed at Miss Intercontinental.
- Competed at Miss Supranational.
- Competed at Reina Internacional del Trópico.
- Competed at Miss Exclusive of the World.

Year	Titleholder	Hometown	Placement	Special Award	Notes
2026					
2025	In 2025, due to changes in the dates of the national pageant, the election of the state queens was postponed for one year.				
2024	Alejandra Hernández	Monterrey	-	-	-
2023	Karen Elizabeth García de León	García	Top 10	Beach Beauty	Miss Culture International for Arts 2019; Top 15 at Miss Intercontinental México 2018; Miss Intercontinental Nuevo León 2018; Competed at Mexicana Universal Nuevo León 2017; Competed at Miss Earth Nuevo León 2016; Miss Earth García 2016
2022	In 2022, due to changes in the dates of the national pageant, the election of the state queens was postponed for one year.				
2021	In 2021, due to changes in the dates of the national pageant, the election of the state queens was postponed for one year.				
2020	Gloria Sofía Cano Méndez	Guadalupe	3rd Runner-up	-	Competed at Mrs Universe México 2024; Mrs Universe Nuevo León 2024; Competed at Miss Ciudad de México 2017; Competed at Miss Earth Ciudad de México 2017; Competed at Miss Earth Nuevo León 2016; Miss Earth Guadalupe
2019	Debanhi Alejandra Alemán Rocha	Guadalupe	-	-	Señorita CEU 2018; Competed at Queen & Beauty Universe 2017; Reina Belleza Universo México 2017; Reina Belleza Nuevo León 2017; Reina Belleza Guadalupe 2017; Competed at Miss Earth Nuevo León 2016; Miss Earth Cadereyta 2016
2018	Paola Sofía Tanguma Villareal	Monterrey	3rd Runner-up	-	Competed at Miss Nuevo León 2019; Competed at The Miss Globe 2018; The Miss Globe México 2018; Competed at Mexicana Universal Nuevo León 2017
2017	Dania Steysie Sánchez Niño	Aramberri	-	-	Competed at Mexicana Universal 2023: Mexicana Universal Nuevo León 2022; Competed at Nuestra Belleza Nuevo León 2016; Competed in Miss Earth Nuevo León 2015
2016	Andrea Merodio Reyes	Escobedo	Top 20	-	Top 16 at Mexicana Universal 2018; Mexicana Universal Nuevo León 2017; Miss Earth Escobedo 2016
2015	Graciela Judith García Yves	Monterrey	Top 8	Miss Photogenic	Competed at Nuestra Belleza Nuevo León 2013
2014	Sugheidy Yasmín Willie Sauceda	Monterrey	-	-	Top 7 at Miss Emerald International 2020; Miss Emerald México 2020; Reina Internacional del Trópico 2016; Reina del Trópico México 2016; 3rd Runner-up at Nuestra Belleza Nuevo León 2013
2013	Ilse Georgina Acosta Vargas	San Nicolás	-	Miss Friendship	Miss Multiverse México 2022; Top 6 at Miss México 2021; Miss Coahuila 2019; Miss Multiverse México 2019; Competed at Miss Model of the World México 2019; Competed at Miss Nuevo León 2016; Was born in Coahuila
2012	Evelyn Elvia Nelly Castro Martínez	Guadalupe	-	-	Competed at Nuestra Belleza Nuevo León 2012
2011	Lesly García Peña	Monterrey	-	-	-
2010	Issamar Cavazos Olivares	Monterrey	-	-	-
2009	Alejandra Treviño García	Monterrey	-	Miss Friendship	-

== See also ==
- Mexicana Universal Nuevo León
- Miss Nuevo León
