= Mexico's Next Top Model season 1 =

Mexico's Next Top Model
- Season 1
- Season 1 cast
- Presented by: Elsa Benítez
- Judges: Elsa Benítez; Allan Fis; Glenda Reyna; Jo Lance
- No. of episodes: 12

Release
- Original network: Sony Entertainment
- Original release: 1 October – 17 December 2009

Season chronology
- Next → Season 2

Season one of Mexico's Next Top Model, the Mexican adaptation of Tyra Banks' America's Next Top Model, aired on Sony Entertainment Television from October 1 to December 17 2009. The show was hosted by Mexican model Elsa Benítez, with a judging panel composed of photographer Allan Fis, TV personality Jo Lance, and former model Glenda Reyna.

The prizes for this season included a US$100,000 contract with Shock Modeling, a cover feature and an editorial spread in Glamour magazine, and trips to San Francisco and London sponsored by Sedal.

The winner of the competition was 18-year-old Mariana Bayón from Coahuila.

== Cast ==
=== Contestants ===
(Ages stated are at the start of the contest)

Name	Age	Height	Home state	Finish	Place
Kathya Amor	19	1.75 m (5 ft 9 in)	Sinaloa	Episode 2	13
Yatzil Rubio	22	1.80 m (5 ft 11 in)	State of Mexico	Episode 3	12
Maria Isabel Nieto	22	1.73 m (5 ft 8 in)	Federal District	Episode 4	11
Maria Fernanda Sánchez	20	1.73 m (5 ft 8 in)	State of Mexico	Episode 5	10
Ana Laura Cubas	21	1.72 m (5 ft 7 1/2 in)	Nuevo León	Episode 6	9
Silvia Noyola	19	1.70 m (5 ft 7 in)	Federal District	Episode 7	8
Anelís Echegaray	23	1.73 m (5 ft 8 in)	Morelos	Episode 8	7
Verónica Sánchez	18	1.79 m (5 ft 10 1/2 in)	San Luis Potosí	Episode 9	6
Andrea Carrión	20	1.72 m (5 ft 7 1/2 in)	Jalisco	Episode 10	5
Paulina Haro	24	1.74 m (5 ft 8 1/2 in)	Nuevo León	Episode 11	4
Cecilia Pérez	21	1.73 m (5 ft 8 in)	San Luis Potosí	Episode 12	3
Nohemí Hermosillo	18	1.74 m (5 ft 8 1/2 in)	Estado de México	Episode 12	2
Mariana Bayón	18	1.78 m (5 ft 10 in)	Coahuila	Episode 12	1

=== Judges ===
- Elsa Benítez (host)
- Allan Fis
- Jo Lance
- Glenda Reyna

=== Other cast members ===
- Oscar Madrazo - creative director

== Episodes ==
No. overall	No. in season	Title	Original release date
1	1	"Episode 1"	1 October 2009
The 20 chosen semi-finalists converged on Puebla's La Purificadora hotel for casting week, where they met the judges for interviews and took part in a photo shoot where they had to portray angels. At the end of the episode, the judges selected the final 13.
2	2	"Episode 2"	8 October 2009
The contestants moved into their new home in Mexico City, and were later taken to meet Sears representative Edgar Smolensky for a styling challenge, which was won by Cecilia. The models later posed as dog walkers wearing lingerie for the photo shoot, and at elimination, Kathya became the first contestant to leave the competition.: Featured photographer: Tito Trueba; Special guests: Edgar Smolensky, Mauricio Olvera
3	3	"Episode 3"	15 October 2009
The contestants were introduced to MAC representative Jorge Rios, and had a make-up challenge, which was won by Verónica. They later received makeovers, and had a colorful fabric photo shoot in pairs. At elimination, Yatzil became the second contestant to leave the competition.: Featured photographer: David Franco; Special guests: Jorge Rios, Alex Lopex, Desiré Navarro
4	4	"Episode 4"	22 October 2009
The contestants received a runway lesson at the circus, and had a runway challenge later that night. Cecilia was deemed as the best performer, winning a feature in Glamour magazine. At the photo shoot the models were given colorful styling and hung upside down, with the final shots being judged right-side up. At elimination, Isabel became the third contestant to leave the competition.: Featured photographer: Tito Trueba; Special guests: JLo, Paulina Flores
5	5	"Episode 5"	29 October 2009
The remaining ten contestants visited the Etro boutique in Polanco for a posing lesson with boutique owner Andrea Ororica, and had a posing challenge as window display mannequins, which was won by Nohemí. They later posed as couture interpretations of la Catrina. At elimination, Fernanda became the fourth contestant to leave the competition.: Featured photographer: Edgar Ladrón de Guevara; Special guests: Andrea Ororica
6	6	"Episode 6"	5 November 2009
The contestants were taken to the Anahuacalli Museum to practice their emoting for a challenge in which they had to portray six different emotions for a series of photos, where Silvia, Paulina, and Nohemí were chosen as the winners. At the photo shoot, the models had to pose as criminals getting their mugshots taken, with each contestant portraying a different character. At elimination, Ana Laura became the fifth contestant to leave the competition.: Featured photographer: David Franco; Special guests: Paulina Flores
7	7	"Episode 7"	12 November 2009
The contestants were taken to the offices of Shock Modeling management to meet agency director Estela Saenz for a go-sees challenge with designers around the city, at the end of which Paulina, Verónica, Nohemí, and Andrea were chosen as the winners. The models later arrived at the Naucalpan Arena for a photo shoot where they were styled in glamorous outfits while wrestlers fought in the background. At elimination, Silvia became the sixth contestant to leave the competition.: Featured photographer: Hermanos Clint; Special guests: Estela Saenz, Mauricio Olvera
8	8	"Episode 8"	19 November 2009
The contestants met commercial director Freddy Garza for a workshop, before being introduced to actor and RBD band member Alfonso Herrera for an acting challenge, which was won by Cecilia. The models later shot a commercial for Sedal, under the direction of Mario Muñoz. At elimination, Anelís became the seventh contestant to leave from the competition.: Featured director: Mario Muñoz; Special guests: Freddy Garza, Alfonso Herrera, Mario Muñoz, Laura Ramirez
9	9	"Episode 9"	26 November 2009
The contestants had a challenge in which they had to learn the skills of communication between a photographer and model by taking photos of one another, where Paulina was chosen as the winner. The models later had a photo shoot, with male model Guillerme Casali, in which they had to portray a couple stuck on the side of the road, and found out that they would be getting their photos taken by America's Next Top Model judge Nigel Barker. At elimination, Verónica became the eighth contestant to leave the competition.: Featured photographer: Nigel Barker; Special guests: Aislinn Derbez, Guilherme Casali
10	10	"Episode 10"	3 December 2009
The remaining contestants met the director of Glamour magazine, Mar Abascal, and had a runway challenge on top of a bar counter where Cecilia was deemed as the best performer, winning a photo shoot session with judge Allan Fis. The models later met photographer Gregory Allen for a photo shoot where they posed with actor Erick Elías, to portray famous Telenovela posters. At elimination, Andrea became the ninth contestant to leave the competition.: Featured photographer: Gregory Allen; Special guests: Dinora Cetina, Mar Abascal, Erick Elías,
11	11	"Episode 11"	10 December 2009
The contestants met TV presenter Rebecca de Alba for a lesson on dealing with the press, as well as maintaining their self-esteem while competing with other models in the industry. They were then taken for an interview challenge with Candela Ferro, which was won by Cecilia, who was given half of Mariana's frames for the next photo shoot. The models later visited the Frida Kahlo Museum, where they posed in a composite photo shoot dressed as Frida Kahlo painting a self-portrait. At elimination, Paulina became the tenth contestant to be eliminated from the competition, leaving Cecilia, Mariana, and Nohemí as the three remaining finalists.: Featured photographer: Ivan Aguirre; Special guests: Rebecca de Alba, Candela Ferro
12	12	"Episode 12"	17 December 2009
The final three traveled to Ixtapa, where they shot a commercial for Sedal, before having their photos taken in a trampoline photo shoot, after which Cecilia was eliminated. The remaining two contestants, Mariana and Nohemí, took part in a final runway show. After the final deliberation, Mariana was crowned as the first winner of Mexico's Next Top Model.: Featured photographer: Alan Fis

== Results ==
Order	Episodes												
Order	1 (Note: In episode 1, the group of 20 semi-finalists was reduced to 13 contestants.)	2	3	4	5	6	7	8	9	10	11	12	
1	Cecilia	Fernanda	Nohemí	Anelís	Nohemí	Mariana	Mariana	Nohemí	Nohemí	Paulina	Nohemí	Nohemí	Mariana
2	Verónica	Verónica	Paulina	Silvia	Ana Laura	Nohemí	Cecilia	Mariana	Paulina	Cecilia	Cecilia	Mariana	Nohemí
3	Ana Laura	Cecilia	Mariana	Andrea	Andrea	Cecilia	Paulina	Andrea	Mariana	Mariana	Mariana	Cecilia	
4	Paulina	Nohemí	Cecilia	Nohemí	Cecilia	Andrea	Andrea	Cecilia	Cecilia	Nohemí	Paulina		
5	Mariana	Mariana	Verónica	Paulina	Paulina	Paulina	Anelís	Verónica	Andrea	Andrea			
6	Yatzil	Isabel	Anelís	Mariana	Silvia	Silvia	Nohemí	Paulina	Verónica				
7	Silvia	Andrea	Ana Laura	Ana Laura	Mariana	Verónica	Verónica	Anelís					
8	Nohemí	Ana Laura	Fernanda	Fernanda	Verónica	Anelís	Silvia						
9	Fernanda	Anelís	Silvia	Cecilia	Anelís	Ana Laura							
10	Isabel	Paulina	Isabel	Verónica	Fernanda								
11	Anelís	Silvia	Andrea	Isabel									
12	Kathya	Yatzil	Yatzil										
13	Andrea	Kathya											

The contestant was eliminated
The contestant won the competition
