= Mexico's Next Top Model season 3 =

Mexico's Next Top Model
- Season 3
- Judges: Elsa Benítez; Allan Fis; Antonio González de Cosío; Glenda Reyna
- No. of contestants: 13
- Winner: Sahily Córdova
- No. of episodes: 13

Release
- Original network: Sony Entertainment Television
- Original release: 4 September – 27 November 2012

Season chronology
- ← Previous; Season 2 Next → Season 4

Season three of Mexico's Next Top Model, the Mexican adaptation of Tyra Banks' America's Next Top Model, aired on Sony Entertainment Television from September 4 to November 27 2012. The show was hosted by Mexican model Elsa Benítez. Former judge Jo Lance was replaced by fashion correspondent and consultant Antonio González de Cosío.

The prize package for this season included a US$100,000 modeling contract with Queta Rojas management, a cover feature and an editorial spread in Elle magazine, an all-expenses paid trip to New York City to meet with modeling agencies, and a brand new Volkswagen.

The winner of the competition was 18-year-old Sahily Córdova from Hermosillo, Sonora.

== Cast ==
=== Contestants ===
(Ages stated are at start of contest)

Contestant	Age	Height	Hometown	Finish	Place
Amira Díaz	19	1.76 m (5 ft 9 1/2 in)	Veracruz	Episode 2	13
Lilia Fifield	22	1.77 m (5 ft 9 1/2 in)	Tijuana	Episode 3	12
Leti Ortíz	20	1.78 m (5 ft 10 in)	Puebla City	Episode 4	11
Analí Ramos	22	1.73 m (5 ft 8 in)	Chihuahua City	Episode 5	10
Eloina Cavazos	21	1.78 m (5 ft 10 in)	Monterrey	Episode 6	9
Ana Paula Crippa	20	1.74 m (5 ft 8 1/2 in)	Veracruz	Episode 7	8
Sue Ellen García	21	1.73 m (5 ft 8 in)	Monterrey	Episode 8	7
Jessica Ortíz	20	1.73 m (5 ft 8 in)	Mérida	Episode 9	6
Sofía Saviano	19	1.79 m (5 ft 10 1/2 in)	Torreón	Episode 10	5
Perla Gaspar	18	1.74 m (5 ft 8 1/2 in)	Hermosillo	Episode 11	4
Alessa Bravo	19	1.69 m (5 ft 6 1/2 in)	Guadalajara	Episode 12	3
Paulina Barragán	24	1.76 m (5 ft 9 1/2 in)	Guadalajara	Episode 12	2
Sahily Córdova	18	1.78 m (5 ft 10 in)	Hermosillo	Episode 12	1

=== Judges ===
- Elsa Benitez (host)
- Allan Fis
- Antonio González de Cosío
- Glenda Reyna

=== Other cast members ===
- Oscar Madrazo - creative director
- Jackie Saad Robinson - Original Creative Direction and concept

=== Episodes ===
No. overall	No. in season	Title	Original release date
26	1	"Episode 1"	4 September 2012
The top 20 semi-finalists converged at Mexico City's Downtown hotel, where they took part in a styling lesson and later had runway practice with judges Óscar Madrazo and Glenda Reyna. After a simplistic beauty shoot, the models had one on one interviews with the judges, which were followed by an elimination. The remaining contestants took part in a gymnastics themed photo shoot, and at the end of the week, the judges selected the final 13.: Featured photographer: Óscar Turco
27	2	"Episode 2"	11 September 2012
The final 13 moved into the top model house, and had a discussion with judge Antonio González de Cosío about their personal style. They later had a styling and catwalk challenge at Sears which was won by Paulina, where they were judged by purchasing director Edgar Smolensky alongside former winners Mariana Bayón and Tracy Reuss. At the photo shoot, the models were photographed as Aztec goddesses wearing swimwear, and following the first deliberation, Amira became the first contestant to leave the competition.: Featured photographer: Mauricio Vélez; Special guests: Edgar Smolensky, Mariana Bayón, Tracy Reuss
28	3	"Episode 3"	18 September 2012
The remaining contestants received makeovers, and later had a makeup lesson in preparation for a timed makeup challenge in groups, which was won by Sue. The models were later photographed by judge Allan Fís for a disco-themed photo shoot, and at elimination, Lili became the second contestant to leave the competition.: Featured photographer: Allan Fís; Special guests: Olivia Peralta, Yetli Delgado, Rodolfo Arciga
29	4	"Episode 4"	25 September 2012
The contestants had a meeting with nutritionist Ana Lucía Mendoza, which was followed by a workshop with model coach Dinorah Cetina where they learned about posing and channeling emotions. They later had a posing and photo shoot challenge in the countryside with motorcyclists, where Perla and Ana Paula were chosen as the winners. For the main photo shoot, the models had to pose alongside hanging meat in a butcher shop. At elimination, Leti was chosen as the third contestant to leave the competition.: Featured photographers: Joaquín Raya, Rames Xelhuantzi; Special guests: Ana Lucía Mendoza, Dinorah Cetina
30	5	"Episode 5"	2 October 2012
The contestants were introduced to Argentinian model Betiana Wolenberg for a runway lesson, and had a group challenge where they were made to walk on the runway for three consecutive hours. They later had a runway challenge on a slippery surface wearing raincoats, where Alessa was chosen as the best performer. For the photo shoot, the models were photographed in motion alongside a Volkswagen. At elimination, Analí was chosen as the fourth contestant to leave the competition.: Featured photographer: Álvaro Nates; Special guests: Betiana Wolenberg, Norby Legareso
31	6	"Episode 6"	9 October 2012
The contestants attended a yoga class with instructor Alejandro Maldonado before participating in a boxing challenge at the Sport City Acoxpa gym, where judge Glenda Reyna emphasized the importance of endurance, health, and fitness in a model's career. Sofía delivered the best overall performance, winning a one-year gym membership at Sport City to support her fitness journey. For their final challenge, the models had to showcase both their masculine and feminine sides in two separate photo shoots—the first styled as women and the second as men. At elimination, Eloína became the fifth contestant to leave the competition.: Featured photographer: Jean Berard
32	7	"Episode 7"	16 October 2012
The contestants attended an acting class with actor Leonardo García, where Sahily shocked everyone by kissing him during an exercise. Back at the house, judges Glenda Reyna and Antonio González de Cosío visited the models for a game of “Truth or Dare” and “Spin the Bottle,” leading to personal revelations and daring challenges. For the weekly photo shoot, the models paid homage to María Félix, by portraying the iconic renowned actress from the Golden Age of Mexican Cinema. At elimination, Ana Paula became the sixth contestant to leave the competition.: Featured photographer: Iván Aguirre; Special guests: Leonardo García
33	8	"Episode 8"	23 October 2012
Featured photographer: Johnny Lopera; Special guests:
34	9	"Episode 9"	30 October 2012
The remaining six contestants underwent a second round of makeovers, and later had a posing lesson under the instruction of choreographer Guillermina Gómez, which was followed by a posing challenge with mannequins where Jessica was deemed to be the best performer. The models then had a rock-themed photo shoot session with the members of Moderatto, and at the end of the week, Jessica became the eighth contestant to leave the competition.: Featured photographer: S País; Special guests: Guillermina Gómez, Moderatto
35	10	"Episode 10"	6 November 2012
Featured photographer: Fernando Degaray; Special guests:
36	11	"Episode 11"	13 November 2012
Featured photographer: Anairam; Special guests:
37	12	"Episode 12"	20 November 2012
Featured photographer: Santiago Ruiseñor; Special guests:
38	13	"Episode 13"	27 November 2012
This episode recapped the entire season, and showed previously unaired footage for the first time.

== Results ==
Order	Episodes												
Order	1 (Note: In episode 1, the group of 20 semi-finalists was narrowed down to 13.)	2	3	4	5	6	7	8	9	10	11	12	
1	Perla	Leti	Perla	Alessa	Jessica	Paulina	Paulina	Perla	Sahily	Paulina	Alessa	Sahily	Sahily
2	Sue	Alessa	Paulina	Paulina	Sahily	Sofía	Jessica	Paulina	Paulina	Alessa	Sahily	Paulina	Paulina
3	Analí	Sahily	Sahily	Sahily	Paulina	Jessica	Sahily	Alessa	Sofía	Sahily	Paulina	Alessa	
4	Leti	Ana Paula	Leti	Perla	Perla	Sue	Perla	Jessica	Perla	Perla	Perla		
5	Amira	Paulina	Sue	Sofía	Alessa	Alessa	Alessa	Sahily	Alessa	Sofía			
6	Paulina	Jessica	Analí	Sue	Sofía	Ana Paula	Sue	Sofía	Jessica				
7	Lili	Sue	Alessa	Eloina	Eloina	Perla	Sofía	Sue					
8	Jessica	Analí	Ana Paula	Ana Paula	Ana Paula	Sahily	Ana Paula						
9	Sahily	Sofía	Jessica	Analí	Sue	Eloina							
10	Eloina	Eloina	Sofía	Jessica	Analí								
11	Ana Paula	Perla	Eloina	Leti									
12	Alessa	Lili	Lili										
13	Sofía	Amira											

The contestant was eliminated
The contestant won the competition
