= Mexico's Next Top Model season 5 =

Mexico's Next Top Model
- Season 5
- Judges: Jaydy Michel; Allan Fis; Glenda Reyna; Oscar Madrazo
- No. of contestants: 13
- Winner: Vanessa Ponce
- No. of episodes: 13

Release
- Original network: Sony Entertainment Television
- Original release: 29 September – 15 December 2014

Season chronology
- ← Previous; Season 4

Season five of Mexico's Next Top Model, the Mexican adaptation of Tyra Banks' America's Next Top Model, aired on Sony Entertainment Television from September 29 to December 15 2014. The show was once again hosted by Mexican model Jaydy Michel. The panel of the previous season remained largely unchanged, save for the addition of creative director Oscar Madrazo as one of the main judges, with judge Antonio González de Cosío serving as the show's creative director in his place.

The prize package for this season included a cash prize of Mex$300,000, $125,000 worth of Tommy Hilfiger apparel along with an appearance for a presentation in New York Fashion Week, $50,000 worth of Mary Kay cosmetics, a modeling contract with Queta Rojas management, a brand new Volkswagen Tiguan, and an editorial spread in Glamour magazine, replacing the show's previous magazine sponsor, Elle.

The winner of the contest was Vanessa Ponce, 22 years old. She was born in Mexico City, Mexico, and represented the city of León in the State of Guanajuato, Mexico.

== Cast ==
=== Contestants ===
(Ages stated are at start of contest)

Contestant	Age	Height	Home state	Finish	Place
Nydia Galindo	23	1.80 m (5 ft 11 in)	Puebla	Episode 2	13
Montserrat Curis	18	1.70 m (5 ft 7 in)	Puebla	Episode 3	12
Diana Gill	22	1.75 m (5 ft 9 in)	Sinaloa	Episode 4	11
Samantha Ochoa	22	1.77 m (5 ft 9 1/2 in)	Aguascalientes	Episode 5	10
Andrea Ibañez	22	1.73 m (5 ft 8 in)	Puebla	Episode 6	9
Elsa Chapa	23	1.75 m (5 ft 9 in)	Nuevo León	Episode 7	8
Elisa Garcia	18	1.75 m (5 ft 9 in)	Sonora	Episode 8	7
Kristen Fara	18	1.74 m (5 ft 8 1/2 in)	Nuevo León	Episode 9	6 (quit)
Roxana Reyes	21	1.76 m (5 ft 9 1/2 in)	Zacatecas	Episode 11	5–4
Nebai Torres	21	1.76 m (5 ft 9 1/2 in)	Jalisco	Episode 11	5–4
Miranda Chamosa	20	1.74 m (5 ft 8 1/2 in)	State of Mexico	Episode 12	3
Mariana Berumen	22	1.78 m (5 ft 10 in)	Jalisco	Episode 12	2
Vanessa Ponce	22	1.72 m (5 ft 7 1/2 in)	Mexico City	Episode 12	1

=== Judges ===
- Jaydy Michel (host)
- Allan Fis
- Glenda Reyna
- Oscar Madrazo

=== Other cast members ===
- Antonio González de Cosío - creative director

== Episodes ==
No. overall	No. in season	Title	Original release date
51	1	"Episode 1"	29 September 2014
The top 20 semi-finalists took part in a bootcamp-themed photo shoot which saw two contestants leave the competition. After a selfie photo shoot and individual interviews with the judges, the contestants faced a second cut. The remaining models then filmed the opening sequence for the show, and at the end of the week, the judges selected the final 13.: Featured photographer: Paco Díaz; Featured director: Alejandro de la Peña
51	2	"Episode 2"	6 October 2014
The finalists moved into the model house, and had a role-playing exercise and style lesson with Antonio González de Cosío where Elsa was deemed to be the best performer. They later had a styling challenge in groups, won by Andrea, before posing in pairs for a photo shoot where they had to embody fatal attraction. At elimination, host Jaydy Michel announced that Antonio González de Cosío would be given the opportunity to save one model from elimination at any point of the competition. Nydia and Roxana landed in the bottom two, and Nydia was chosen as the first contestant to leave the competition.: Featured photographer: Fabián Morassut; Special guest: Edgar Smolensky
53	3	"Episode 3"	13 October 2014
The contestants had a makeup lesson and challenge, won by Vanessa, and later had mock photo shoot to test their professionalism. They also received a visit from singer Carlos Rivera, and were later given makeovers in time for a warrior themed photo shoot that would serve as the season's fade-out at the end of each elimination. At panel, Montserrat became the second contestant to leave the competition.: Featured photographer: Elena Soriano; Special guests: Luis Casco, Rodrigo Magaña, Carlos Rivera, Chino Burgos
54	4	"Episode 4"	20 October 2014
The contestants were introduced to model Denise Duarte, and had a discussion on their body confidence and self-image. They later had a challenge which involved transforming and personalizing several articles of clothing, where Mariana was chosen as the winner, and had to pose as circus oddities in a photo shoot that highlighted their flaws. At elimination, Diana became the third contestant to leave the competition.: Featured photographer: Chris Hunt; Special guests: Denise Duarte, Sergio Alcala
55	5	"Episode 5"	27 October 2014
The remaining contestants were taken to an ice rink for a runway lesson and challenge, where Kristen was chosen as the winner. They later took part in a motion photo shoot that had them walking down the runway wearing eccentric fashion, and had a costume runway challenge in pairs back at the house, which was won by Kristen and Vanessa. At elimination, Samantha became the fourth contestant to leave the competition.: Featured photographer: Stefano Raphael; Special guests: Federico Laboureau, Brenda Felix, Armando Franco, DJ Sexy Devil, Erika Zaba
56	6	"Episode 6"	3 November 2014
The contestants were taken to Xochimilco for a yoga session, which was followed by a timed obstacle-course styling challenge, won by Elisa. They later had a runway and posing lesson with Dinorah Cetina, and were photographed by Jvdas Berra for an underwater photo shoot wearing couture gowns. At elimination, Andrea became the fifth contestant to leave the competition.: Featured photographer: Jvdas Berra; Special guests: Óscar Bojórquez, Dinorah Cetina
57	7	"Episode 7"	10 November 2014
The contestants were introduced to agency owner Queta Rojas, and had a go-sees challenge with representatives from Sears, Mary Kay cosmetics, and Glamour magazine, won respectively by Vanessa, Miranda and Kristen. They later took part in a ballerina photo shoot wearing stilts on a rooftop that overlooked the skyline of Paseo de la Reforma. At elimination, Elsa became the sixth contestant to leave the competition.: Featured photographer: Owen Behan; Special guests: Queta Rojas, Edgar Smolensky, Liliana Camba, Bianca Mier, Gabriela Maldonado, Lucy Lara
58	8	"Episode 8"	17 November 2014
The contestants were introduced to fashion director Lisette Trepaud for a fashion crash course that tested their knowledge of the industry at home and abroad. They then had an interview challenge, won by Mariana, where they had to impress several important guests to receive their business cards. After a house visit from Antonio González de Cosío, the models were whisked off to Teotihuacan for their next photo shoot, where they had to pose on the ladder of a hot air balloon wearing gowns. At elimination, Elisa became the seventh contestant to leave the competition.: Featured photographer: Zony Maya; Special guests: Lisette Trepaud, Gianfranco Reni, Guillermo Tragant, Juanchi Torreh, Lorena Saravia, Monika Biringer, Sara Cuellar, Sarah Bustani
59	9	"Episode 9"	24 November 2014
The contestants received an acting lesson in preparation for an acting challenge, where Nebai was chosen as the winner. They later had a photo shoot with judge Allan Fis in which they had to portray female villains from the ABC series, Once Upon a Time, where it was revealed that the five remaining contestants would be traveling to Hollywood. At elimination, Kristen decided to drop out of the competition. Nebai was eliminated when she landed in the bottom two with Roxana, but was allowed to stay due to Kristen's decision to quit.: Featured photographer: Allan Fis; Special guests: Ana Cecilia Anzaldúa, Anette Michel, Tiziana Domínguez
60	10	"Episode 10"	1 December 2014
The remaining five contestants arrived at Hollywood, and were taken to the Resurrection Vintage boutique for a styling lesson. After moving into their hotel, the models were taken to the Tommy Hilfiger store for a styling challenge, won by Mariana. The second and third best performers, Nebai and Vanessa, accompanied Mariana to the America's Next Top Model launch party for season 21, and were introduced to season 12 contestant, Fo Porter. For the photo shoot, the contestants were styled wearing Tommy Hilfiger clothing at a pool party. At elimination, Roxana was chosen as the ninth contestant to leave the competition, but was saved from elimination by Antonio González de Cosío.: Featured photographer: Derek Woods; Special guests: Sidola Scott, Kathy Rodríguez, Ty Severe, Fo Porter, Trent Wisehart
61	11	"Episode 11"	8 December 2014
The contestants were taken to an amusement park, where they met Dexiree Bandes for pointers on how to conduct a good interview. They later had to interview Yahir on top of a roller coaster while maintaining their composure, with Nebai being chosen as the best performer. In place of the week's photo shoot, the models had to shoot a commercial for the new Volkswagen Tiguan. At elimination, Nebai and Roxana left the competition in a surprise double elimination, leaving Mariana, Miranda, and Vanessa as the three remaining finalists.: Featured director: Chivo Escalante; Special guests: Dexiree Bandes, Yahir, Sergio de Mara
62	12	"Episode 12"	15 December 2014
The final three contestants were sent on individual castings, which later turned out to be secret reunions with their family members. They were later taken to Saks Fifth Avenue to meet the editor-in-chief of Glamour Mexico, Lucy Lara, and had a photo shoot for the magazine wearing high-end designer labels for which Miranda was later eliminated. The remaining two contestants, Mariana and Vanessa, took part in a final runway show alongside previously eliminated contestants and met model Karolina Kurkova, who served as the season's final guest judge for the final deliberation. After the judges reviewed each of the finalists' body of work throughout the competition, Vanessa was crowned as the fifth winner of Mexico's Next Top Model.: Special guests: Lucy Lara, Karolina Kurkova
63	13	"Episode 13"	15 December 2014
This episode recapped the entire season, and showed previously unaired footage for the first time.

== Results ==
Order	Episodes											
Order	1 (Note: In episode 1, the group of 20 semi-finalists was narrowed down to 13.)	2	3	4	5	6	7	8	9 (Note: In episode 9, Kristen quit the competition after learning she was safe. This automatically saved Nebai from elimination.)	10 (Note: In episode 10, Roxana was originally eliminated when she landed in the bottom two with Nebai.)	11 (Note: In episode 11, Nebai and Roxana were both eliminated while in the bottom two.)	12
1	Vanessa	Elisa	Elisa	Vanessa	Nebai	Elsa	Roxana	Mariana	Miranda	Miranda	Mariana	Vanessa
2	Mariana	Kristen	Nebai	Miranda	Vanessa	Vanessa	Miranda	Roxana	Kristen	Vanessa	Vanessa	Mariana
3	Andrea	Vanessa	Miranda	Elisa	Roxana	Kristen	Nebai	Vanessa	Mariana	Mariana	Miranda	Miranda
4	Roxana	Elsa	Kristen	Elsa	Kristen	Nebai	Mariana	Kristen	Vanessa	Nebai	Nebai; Roxana	
5	Kristen	Andrea	Elsa	Roxana	Mariana	Mariana	Vanessa	Miranda	Roxana	Roxana	Nebai; Roxana	
6	Samantha	Nebai	Vanessa	Nebai	Elsa	Miranda	Elisa	Nebai	Nebai			
7	Nydia	Montserrat	Mariana	Mariana	Miranda	Roxana	Kristen	Elisa				
8	Nebai	Diana	Roxana	Kristen	Andrea	Elisa	Elsa					
9	Elisa	Miranda	Diana	Samantha	Elisa	Andrea						
10	Diana	Samantha	Andrea	Andrea	Samantha							
11	Elsa	Mariana	Samantha	Diana								
12	Miranda	Roxana	Montserrat									
13	Montserrat	Nydia										

The contestant was eliminated
The contestant quit the competition
The contestant was eliminated but allowed to remain in the competition
The contestant won the competition
