= Nuestra Belleza Estado de México 2011 =

- Date: July 9, 2011
- Venue: Clássico Toluca, Toluca, Estado de México
- Broadcaster: Televisa
- Entrants: 8
- Placements: 5
- Winner: Nohemí Hermosillo; Toluca

Nuestra Belleza Estado de México 2011, was held at the Clássico Toluca, Toluca, Estado de México on July 9, 2011. At the conclusion of the final night of competition Nohemí Hermosillo of Toluca was crowned the winner. Hermosillo was crowned by Nuestra Belleza Estado de México 2009 Mercedes Gutiérrez. Eight contestants competed for the title.

== Results ==
=== Placements ===
Final results	Contestant
Nuestra Belleza Estado de México 2011	Nohemí Hermosillo
Suplente / 1st Runner-up	Ana Paula Arochi
2nd Runner-up	Melissa Cabral
3rd Runner-up	Cintia Medina
4th Runner-up	Sheiry López

== Contestants ==
Hometown	Contestant	Age	Height
Temoaya	Ana Cristina Tellez Becerril	22	1.72
Tlalnepantla	Cintia Irene Medina Arauna	19	1.69
Toluca	Ana Paula Arochi López	21	1.70
Toluca	Beatríz Mancilla López	23	1.69
Toluca	María Luisa Varela Vilchis	20	1.70
Toluca	Melisa Cabral Robledo	18	1.71
Toluca	Nohemí Hermosillo Villalobos	20	1.73
Toluca	Sheiry Quetzalt López Vergara	22	1.68
