= Mexico's Next Top Model season 4 =

Mexico's Next Top Model
- Season 4
- Judges: Jaydy Michel; Allan Fis; Antonio González de Cosío; Glenda Reyna
- No. of contestants: 14
- Winner: Paloma Aguilar

Release
- Original network: Sony Entertainment Television
- Original release: 19 August – 4 November 2013

Season chronology
- ← Previous; Season 3 Next → Season 5

Season four of Mexico's Next Top Model, the Mexican adaptation of Tyra Banks' America's Next Top Model, aired on Sony Entertainment Television from August 19 to November 4 2013. Former host Elsa Benítez left the show and was replaced by Jaydy Michel. With the exception of Benítez, all of the judges from the previous season returned for the new season of the show.

The prize package for this season included a US$100,000 modeling contract with Queta Rojas management, a cover feature and an editorial spread in Elle magazine, and a brand new Volkswagen.

The winner of the competition was 18-year-old Paloma Aguilar from Sonora.

== Cast ==
=== Contestants ===
(Ages stated are at start of contest)

Contestant	Age	Height	Home state	Finish	Place
Jonnuem Torres	18	1.77 m (5 ft 9 1/2 in)	Federal District	Episode 2	14
Alejandra Ruz	19	1.75 m (5 ft 9 in)	Jalisco	Episode 3	13
Lucía De la Vega	19	1.70 m (5 ft 7 in)	Quintana Roo	Episode 4	12
Valeria Carmona	18	1.73 m (5 ft 8 in)	Chihuahua	Episode 5	11
Magui Jimenez	21	1.78 m (5 ft 10 in)	Guanajuato	Episode 6	10
Stefy Vargas	18	1.73 m (5 ft 8 in)	Colima	Episode 6	9
Renata Aguilar	19	1.73 m (5 ft 8 in)	Federal District	Episode 7	8
Karely Carreón	18	1.77 m (5 ft 9 1/2 in)	Nuevo León	Episode 8	7 (quit)
Michel Estrada	18	1.74 m (5 ft 8 1/2 in)	Sonora	Episode 9	6
Clara Gonzalez	22	1.75 m (5 ft 9 in)	Jalisco	Episode 10	5
Bárbara Cortéz	21	1.78 m (5 ft 10 in)	Nuevo León	Episode 11	4
Iliana Ruiz	18	1.77 m (5 ft 9 1/2 in)	Sonora	Episode 12	3
Cindy Gradilla	19	1.76 m (5 ft 9 1/2 in)	Jalisco	Episode 12	2
Paloma Aguilar	18	1.77 m (5 ft 9 1/2 in)	Sonora	Episode 12	1

=== Judges ===
- Jaydy Michel (host)
- Allan Fis
- Antonio González de Cosío
- Glenda Reyna

=== Other cast members ===
- Oscar Madrazo - creative director

== Episodes ==
=== Episodes ===
No. overall	No. in season	Title	Original release date
39	1	"Episode 1"	19 August 2013
Featured photographer: Special guests:
40	2	"Episode 2"	26 August 2013
Featured photographer: Special guests:
41	3	"Episode 3"	2 September 2013
Featured photographer: Special guests:
42	4	"Episode 4"	9 September 2013
Featured photographers: Special guests:
43	5	"Episode 5"	16 September 2013
Featured photographer: Special guests:
44	6	"Episode 6"	23 September 2013
Featured photographer: Special guests:
45	7	"Episode 7"	30 September 2013
Featured photographer: Special guests:
46	8	"Episode 8"	7 October 2013
Featured photographer: Special guests:
47	9	"Episode 9"	14 October 2013
Featured photographer: Special guests:
48	10	"Episode 10"	21 October 2013
Featured photographer: Special guests:
49	11	"Episode 11"	28 October 2013
Featured photographer: Special guests:
50	12	"Episode 12"	4 November 2013
Featured photographer: Special guests:

== Results ==
Order	Episodes											
Order	2 (Note: In episode 1, the group of 20 semi-finalists was narrowed down to 14.)	3	4	5	6 (Note: In episode 6, Magui was called first for having the best photo but was eliminated for performing the worst in both of the challenges.)	7	8 (Note: In episode 8, Karely withdrew from the competition due to an injury. Clara was eliminated when she landed in the bottom two with Iliana, but was allowed to remain in the competition.)	9	10	11	12	
1	Karely	Iliana	Cindy	Iliana	Magui	Iliana	Cindy	Clara	Paloma	Cindy	Paloma	Paloma
2	Clara	Paloma	Bárbara	Bárbara	Bárbara	Paloma	Bárbara	Cindy	Cindy	Paloma	Cindy	Cindy
3	Renata	Michel	Karely	Clara	Cindy	Cindy	Paloma	Bárbara	Iliana	Iliana	Iliana	
4	Iliana	Stefy	Clara	Cindy	Paloma	Clara	Michel	Paloma	Bárbara	Bárbara		
5	Stefy	Cindy	Paloma	Paloma	Iliana	Michel	Iliana	Iliana	Clara			
6	Paloma	Karely	Iliana	Karely	Clara	Karely	Clara	Michel				
7	Bárbara	Bárbara	Stefy	Renata	Michel	Bárbara	Karely					
8	Magui	Lucía	Magui	Magui	Renata	Renata						
9	Cindy	Renata	Valeria	Michel	Karely							
10	Lucía	Clara	Michel	Stefy	Stefy							
11	Michel	Magui	Renata	Valeria								
12	Valeria	Valeria	Lucía									
13	Ruz (Note: Alejandra was referred to by her surname, Ruz, on the show.)	Ruz										
14	Jonnuem											

The contestant was eliminated
The contestant quit the competition
The contestant was eliminated but allowed to remain in the competition
The contestant won the competition
