= Mexico's Next Top Model =

- Genre: Reality television
- Created by: Tyra Banks
- Presented by: Jaydy Michel
- Judges: Jaydy Michel (4-5); Allan Fis (1-5); Glenda Reyna (1-5); Óscar Madrazo (5); Antonio Gonzalez de Cosio (3-4); Elsa Benítez (1-3); Jo Lance (1-2)
- Country of origin: Mexico
- No. of seasons: 5
- No. of episodes: 63

Production
- Running time: 60 mins

Original release
- Network: Sony Entertainment
- Release: October 1, 2009 – December 15, 2014

Mexico's Next Top Model is a Mexican reality television series that aired on Sony Entertainment Television from October 1, 2009, to December 15, 2014. The show, hosted by Mexican fashion model Elsa Benitez, and later Jaydy Michel, was based on Tyra Banks' America's Next Top Model (2003–2018) and aimed to discover Mexico's next top fashion model.

Over the course of five seasons, contestants competed for an array of prizes including modeling and advertisement contracts, while taking part in a number of photo shoots and other fashion related challenges. It was the second adaptation of Top Model in Latin America after Brazil's Next Top Model, which aired three seasons from 2007 to 2009, and was hosted by model Fernanda Motta.

== Series overview ==
The series closely followed the format of America's Next Top Model, where each episode featured a challenge focused on an important aspect of modeling, designed to help the contestants improve for the weekly photo shoot. These challenges were typically judged by a variety of special guests, including actors and relevant figures from the fashion industry. Following the challenge segment, the contestants participated in a photo shoot, with their overall performance being evaluated by the show's judges, along with a guest judge unique to each episode.

After the individual evaluations, the judges would deliberate privately to decide which model(s) to eliminate. Once the decision was made, the models would return to the room, where the host would call out the names of the contestants, from best to worst, who had advanced to the next week of the competition, handing them a copy of their best photo from the shoot. The last two contestants, whose names had not been called, would receive feedback on why they were in the bottom two, with one or more being eliminated.

In season five, creative director and former judge Antonio Gonzalez de Cosio was granted the opportunity to save one contestant from elimination at any point in the competition. He ultimately chose to save 21 year-old Roxana Reyes during the season's tenth episode, though she wound up being eliminated again just one episode later.

== Judges ==
The following have served as judges or mentors within the show, appearing as either a head judge, main judge or a recurring judge:

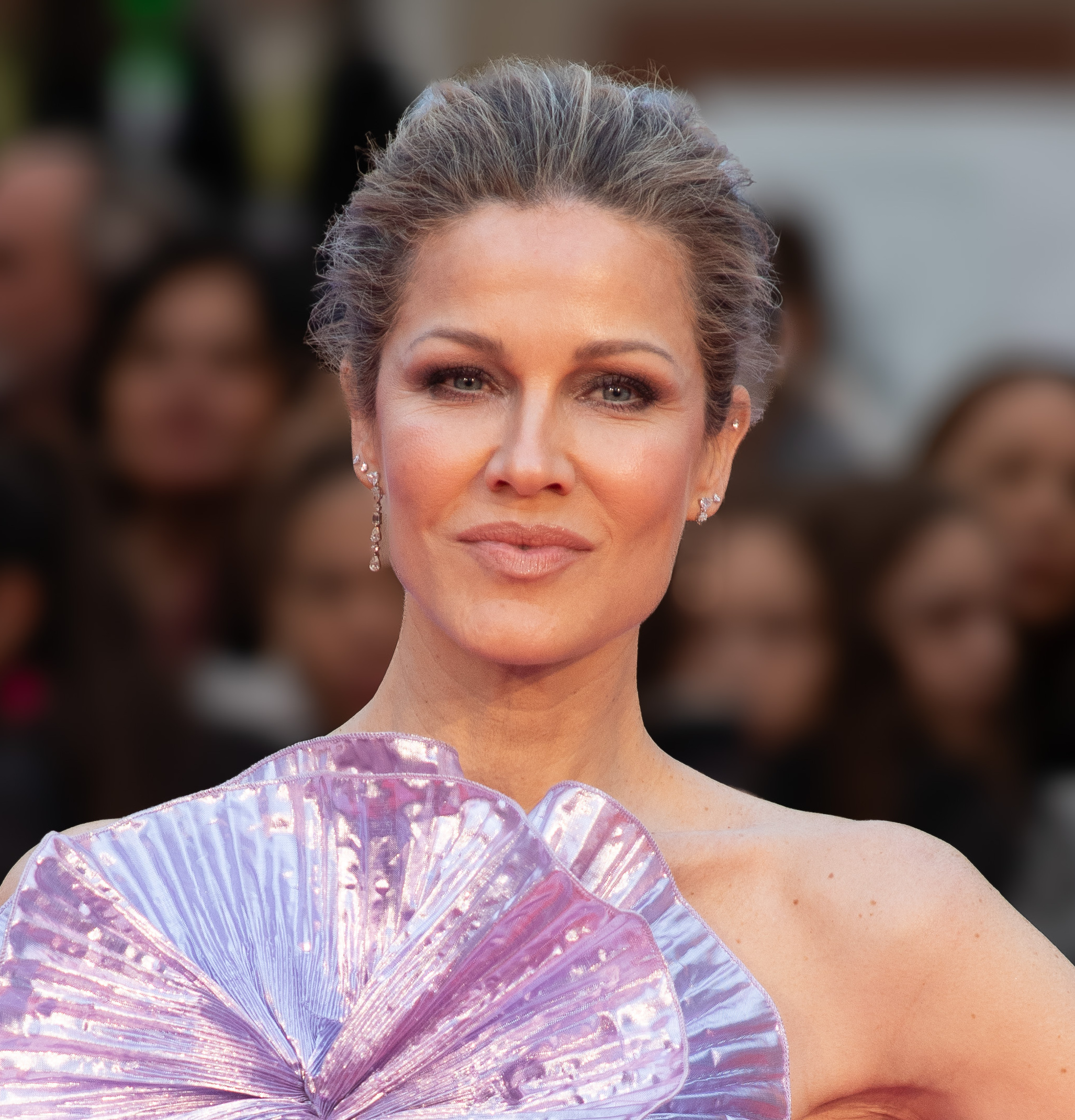
Mexican actress and model Jaydy Michel, who hosted the series for seasons 4 and 5.

Jaydy Michel, Mexican model and actress. She has walked for designers such as Torretta, Javier Larrainzar, and Agatha Ruiz de la Prada and appeared on the covers of Elle, Marie Claire, Vogue, and GQ. She has also worked on campaigns for Tous, Wella, Gillette, and Platino Lingerie.

Glenda Reyna, former model, public relations specialist, and artist manager, led Shock Modeling management, which represented Mariana Bayón and Tracy Reuss, winners of the first two seasons. In the 1970s, she modeled for designers such as Carlo y Keko de Mikchelis and Ricardo Santana. She worked with photographers like Cristian Benson and appeared in Vogue, Kena, and Vértigo. She collaborated with Oscar de la Renta and Marc Jacobs in Mexico.

Antonio González de Cosio, fashion director, editor, stylist, and public relations specialist, has worked as a contributor for Vogue, Elle, Harper's Bazaar, and Esquire. He was a television commentator on Hacer y Deshacer and helped produce fashion shows for Chanel and Louis Vuitton.

Allan Fís, professional photographer, worked in Paris before becoming a photo editor for Elle magazine. His work has appeared in Vogue, Rolling Stone, Esquire, and Gatopardo.

Óscar Madrazo, director of Contempo Internacional Model Management, led one of the top modeling agencies in Latin America. He began modeling at age 9 and appeared in campaigns for El Palacio de Hierro, Nissan, and Coca-Cola. He has worked with Tyra Banks, Coco Rocha, Cindy Crawford, and Karolina Kurkova.

Elsa Benítez, Mexican top model, has made appearances in Vogue, Marie Claire, Elle, Cosmopolitan, and Harper's Bazaar. She has walked for Chanel, Valentino, Versace, Christian Dior, and Oscar de la Renta and starred in campaigns for CoverGirl, Nine West, and J.Crew. She was one of the few Latin American models to walk Haute Couture runways.

Jo Lance, stylist and creative director, known for innovative concepts. His work has appeared in television, theater, and campaigns such as Avon.

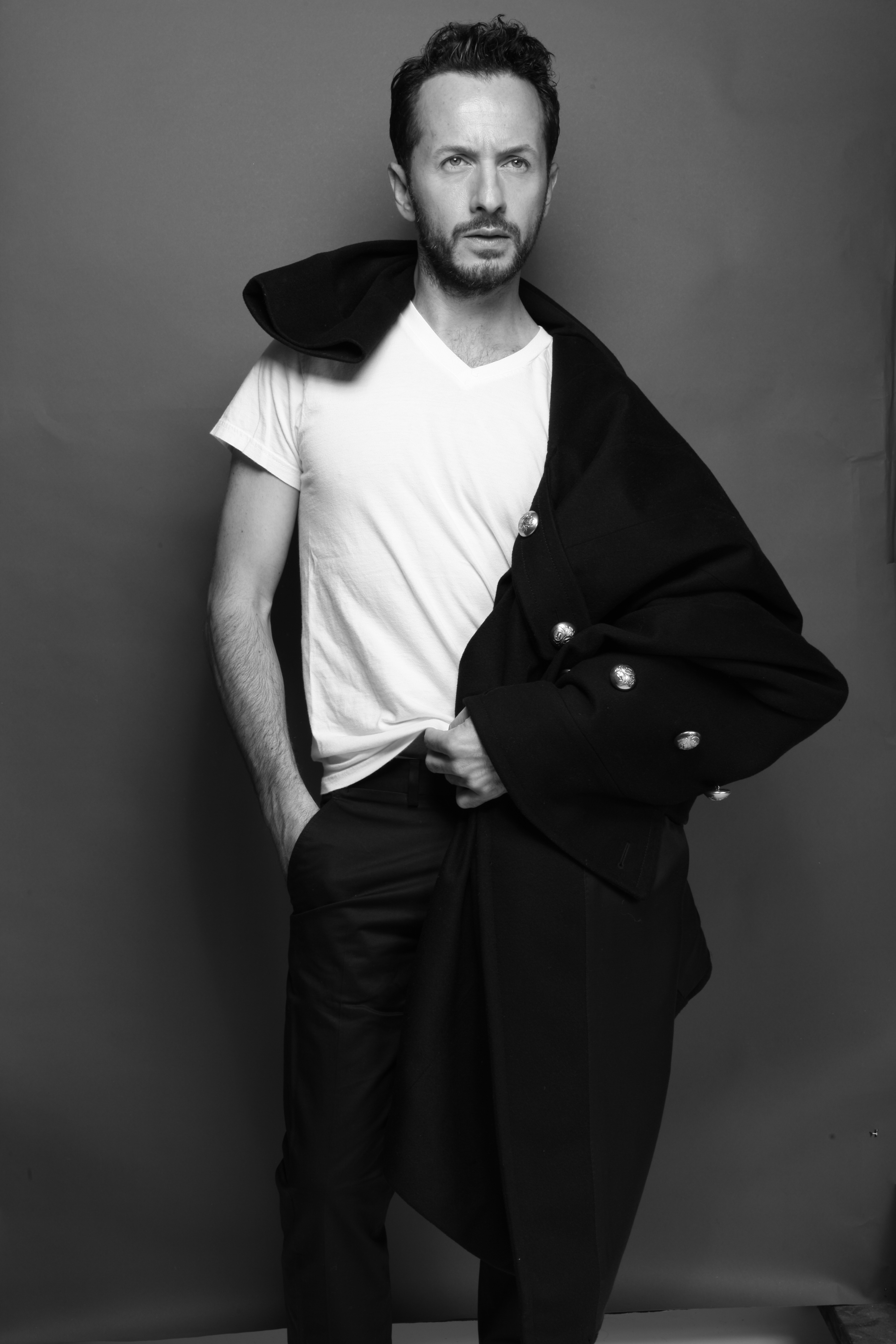
Creative director Óscar Madrazo.

Judge/Mentor	Season				
Judge/Mentor	1 (2009)	2 (2011)	3 (2012)	4 (2013)	5 (2014)
Hosts
Elsa Benítez	Head Judge	Head Judge	Head Judge		
Jaydy Michel				Head Judge	Head Judge
Judging panelists
Allan Fis	Main	Main	Main	Main	Main
Jo Lance	Main	Main			
Glenda Reyna	Main	Main	Main	Main	Main
Antonio González de Cosío			Main	Main	Recurring
Óscar Madrazo	Recurring	Recurring	Recurring	Recurring	Main

== Seasons ==
Cycle	Premiere date	Winner	Runner-up	Other contestants in order of elimination	Number of contestants	International Destinations
1	1 October 2009	Mariana Bayón	Nohemí Hermosillo	Kathya Amor Rodriguez, Yatzil Rubio, Isabel Nieto, Fernanda Sánchez, Ana Laura Cubas, Silvia Noyola, Anelís Echegaray, Verónica Sánchez Alonso, Andrea Carrión, Paulina Haro, Cecilia Pérez Delgadillo	13	None
2	9 August 2011	Tracy Reuss	Nikoll Vogas	Pris Zamora, Veronica Sánchez (quit), Marina Ávila, Xareni Sajarópulos, Ana Claudia Armas, Quetzalli Bulnes, Grecia Vargas & Erika Coronel, Melina Laporta, Lee Velázquez, Fer Herrera, Yael Álvarez	14	None
3	4 September 2012	Sahily Córdova	Paulina Barragán	Amira del Carmen Díaz, Lili Fifield Sanchez, Leti Ortíz Zapatera, Analí Ramos, Eloina Cavazos, Ana Paula Crippa, Sue Ellen García, Jessica Ortíz Palma, Sofía Saviano Garcia, Perla Gaspar Valdez, Alessa Bravo	13	None
4	19 August 2013	Paloma Aguilar	Cindy Gradilla	Jonnuem Torres, Alejandra Ruz, Lucía de la Vega, Valeria Carmona, Magui Jimenez & Stefy Vargas, Renata Aguilar, Karely Carreón (quit), Michel Estrada, Clara Gonzalez, Bárbara Cortéz, Iliana Ruiz	14	None
5	29 September 2014	Vanessa Ponce De Leon	Mariana Berumen	Nydia Galindo, Montserrat Curis, Diana Gill, Samantha Ochoa, Andrea Ibañez Farga, Elsa Chapa, Elisa Ayon Garcia, Kristen Fara (quit), Roxana Reyes Herrera & Nebai Torres, Miranda Chamosa	13	Los Angeles
