= Miss Earth México 2015 =

- Date: September 19, 2015
- Presenters: Anette Cuburu, Patricio Cabezut
- Entertainment: Carlos Marín
- Venue: Hacienda Doña Isabel of Bahía Príncipe Riviera Maya Resorts, Tulum, Quintana Roo
- Broadcaster: Dish Network
- Entrants: 32
- Placements: 16
- Winner: Gladys Flores; Puebla

The 14th annual Miss Earth México pageant was held at the Hacienda Doña Isabel of Bahía Príncipe Riviera Maya Resorts, Tulum, Quintana Roo on September 19, 2015. Thirty-two contestants of the Mexican Republic competed for the national title, which was won by Gladys Flores from Puebla who later competed in Miss Earth 2015 in Austria. Flores was crowned by outgoing Miss Earth México titleholder Yareli Carrillo and Miss Earth 2014 Jamie Herrell. She is the first Poblana to win this title.

== Results ==
=== Miss Earth México ===
Final results	Contestant
Miss Earth México 2015	Puebla – Gladys Flores
Miss Earth Air 2015	Oaxaca – Laura Mojica
Miss Earth Water 2015	Veracruz – Martha Suárez
Miss Earth Fire 2015	Yucatán – Mónica Hernández
Top 8	Chiapas - Deborah Ozuna; Colima - Adriana Ramírez; Nayarit - Belsy Corona; Nuevo León – Graciela García
Top 16	Baja California Sur - Yessica Ascencio; Chihuahua - Lizbeth Trujillo; Durango - Alejandra Castañeda; Guanajuato - Tamara Valenzuela; Jalisco - Patricia Márquez; Sinaloa - Rosaura Ríos; Sonora - Alessandra Serrano; Tamaulipas - Diana Rivera

=== Special awards ===
Award	Contestant
Miss Figure	Veracruz – Martha Suárez
Miss Friendship	Colima - Adriana Ramírez
Miss Photogenic	Nuevo León – Graciela García
Miss Elegance	Sinaloa - Rosaura Ríos
Miss Internet	Chihuahua - Lizbeth Trujillo
Best Evening Gown	Querétaro - Carolina Castro
Recycled Clothing	Veracruz – Martha Suárez
Ecological Project	Campeche – Paloma Sandoval
Best National Costume	Yucatán – Mónica Hernández
Stylized Costume	Campeche – Paloma Sandoval

== Judges ==
=== Preliminary Competition ===
- Anette Cuburu - TV Hostess
- Isaura Espinoza - Actress
- Alejandro Tomassi - Actor
- Fernanda Tapia
- Paty Cantú - Singer

=== Final Competition ===
- Pablo Patton - HR Manager of Earth Checo
- Paola Aguilar - Miss Earth México 2012
- Fernando Santos - Gaviota International Awards' President
- Kateryna Olek - Fashion Designer
- Jesús Gallegos - TV y Novelas magazine's Founder
- Irma Sebada - International Franchice's Director of Miss Earth México
- Isaura Espinosa - Actress
- Paola Arsof - Mexican Lady of Society
- Yazuri González - Fashion Designer
- María Luisa Villarreal - Reina de la Feria de Tulum 2008
- Wendy Ruíz - Politician

== Contestants ==
State	Contestant	Age	Height
Aguascalientes	Andrea De Pablo Vinatier	22	1.73
Baja California	Stephany Itzel Rivera Camarena	24	1.70
Baja California Sur	Yessica Rosalba Ascencio Cisneros	22	1.78
Campeche	Paloma Yazmín Sandoval Mendoza	18	1.70
Chiapas	Deborah Ozuna Rivera	20	1.70
Chihuahua	Lizbeth Alejandra Trujillo Ordoñez	23	1.75
Coahuila	Regina Alejandra González Rentería	23	1.72
Colima	Adriana Daniela Ramírez Cruz	21	1.78
(Mexico City) Distrito Federal	Itzel Sánchez González	21	1.72
Durango	Keila Alejandra Castañeda Tovar	18	1.80
(State of Mexico) Estado de México	Ana Leticia Durán Muños	20	1.70
Guanajuato	Tamara Valenzuela Navarro	19	1.68
Guerrero	Mayra Nallely Moreno Domínguez	23	1.74
Hidalgo	María Daniela Ortiz Zarco	20	1.70
Jalisco	Patricia Márquez Ramírez	23	1.81
Michoacán	Verónica Patiño Duarte	18	1.76
Morelos	Odett González Gómez	20	1.76
Nayarit	Belsy Analí Corona Arce	21	1.80
Nuevo León	Graciela Judith García Yves	23	1.70
Oaxaca	Laura Mojica Romero	20	1.72
Puebla	Gladys Georgete Flores Simón	22	1.83
Querétaro	Carolina Alejandra Castro Chávez	18	1.70
Quintana Roo	Mariana del Carmen Espinoza Vega	23	1.70
San Luis Potosí	Julieta Sheccid Enríquez Ramírez	18	1.76
Sinaloa	Rosaura Ríos Angulo	23	1.75
Sonora	Alessandra Serrano Echave	20	1.74
Tabasco	Estefany Alba Aguirre	23	1.75
Tamaulipas	Diana Lucía Rivera De León	20	1.69
Tlaxcala	Brenda del Rocio Solis López	20	1.70
Veracruz	Martha Leticia Suárez Briano	22	1.74
Yucatán	Mónica Hernández Reynaga	21	1.70
Zacatecas	Blanca Daniela Mauricio Trejo	18	1.68
