= Nuestra Belleza Nuevo León 2014 =

- Date: July 22, 2014
- Venue: Las Lomas Eventos, Monterrey, Nuevo León
- Broadcaster: Televisa
- Entrants: 9
- Placements: 5
- Winner: TBD

Nuestra Belleza Nuevo León 2014, will be held at Las Lomas Eventos in Monterrey, Nuevo León on July 22, 2014. At the conclusion of the final night of competition, Vanesa Montemayor Nuestra Belleza Nuevo León 2013 from Guadalupe will crown her successor. Nine contestants will compete for the title.

== Results ==
=== Placements ===
Final results	Contestant
Nuestra Belleza Nuevo León 2014	Alejandra Medina
Suplente / 1st Runner-up	Lluvia Carrillo
2nd Runner-up	Daniela García
3rd Runner-up	Antoni Silva

=== Special awards ===
Award	Contestant
Miss Personality	Alejandra Medina
Miss Sports	

== Judges ==
TBD

== Contestants ==
Hometown	Contestant	Age	Height (m)
	Alejandra Montserrath Medina Casas	22	1.74
	Antoni Karen Silva Pérez	19	1.70
	Cecilia Velazco Elizondo	20	1.70
	Damaris Sarahí Esquivel García	22	1.75
	Daniela García Martínez	18	1.73
	Edith Lucero Flores Soto	23	1.72
	Julieta Janeth Ramos Sánchez	19	1.70
	Lluvia Quetzalli Carrillo Rivera	20	1.74
	Patricia del Socorro Arizpe Flores	21	1.70
