= Miss Nuevo León =

- Formation: 2016
- Type: Beauty pageant
- Headquarters: Monterrey
- Location: Mexico
- Local Coordinator: Rubén Dávila

Miss Nuevo León is a state-level contest in the state of Nuevo León, Mexico, which selects the state representative for the national contest Miss México, thus aspiring to represent the country internationally on one of the platforms offered.

The state organization has achieved the following results since 2016:

- Winner: 1 (2023)
- Top 10/11: 1 (2019)
- Top 16: 2 (2017, 2025)
- Unplaced: 3 (2016, 2018, 2021)

== International Queens ==
- Sofía González - Miss Elite Americas 2024

== National Queens ==
- Sofía González - Miss México Elite 2024
- Evelyn Álvarez - Miss México Elite 2021 (Designated)

== Titleholders ==
The following are the names of the annual winners of Miss Nuevo León, listed in ascending order, as well as their results during the national Miss México pageant. State queens who represented the country in a current or past franchise of the national organization are also highlighted in a specific color.

Current Franchises:

- Competed at Miss World.
- Competed at Miss Supranational.
- Competed at Miss Cosmo.
- Competed at Miss Elite.
- Competed at Top Model of the World.
- Competed at Reina Internacional del Café.
- Competed at Reina Mundial del Banano.
- Competed at Miss Continentes Unidos.
- Competed at Miss Global City.

Former Franchises:

- Competed at Miss Grand International.
- Competed at Miss Costa Maya International.

Year	Titleholder	Hometown	Placement	Special Award	Notes
2026	Mayra Carolina Valencia Gámez	Monterrey	TBD	-	1st Runner-up at Mexicana Universal 2022; Mexicana Universal Nuevo León 2021
2025	Salma Habibe Garza Quijano	San Pedro	Top 16	-	Top 12 at Miss México Cosmo 2025; Competed at Mexicana Universal Nuevo León 2017
2025	Diana Vanessa Navarro Treviño	Monterrey	-	-	Top 12 at Miss México Cosmo 2025; Competed at Mexicana Universal Nuevo León 2023; Competed at Señorita Regia 2022
2024	In 2024, due to changes in the dates of the national pageant, the election of the state queens was postponed for one year.				
2023	Sofía González Fonseca	García	Miss México Elite	Beach Beauty	Miss Elite Americas 2024; 3rd Runner-up at Miss Elite 2024
2022	In 2022, due to changes in the dates of the national pageant, the election of the state queens was postponed for one year.				
2021	Valeria Cázares Guzmán	San Nicolás	-	-	-
2020	In 2020, due to the contingency of COVID-19 there was a lag in the year of the state contest				
2019	Evelyn Montserrat Álvarez Armendáriz	Santa Catarina	Top 10	-	Top 10 at Miss Elite 2022; Miss México Elite 2022
2018	Alejandra Estefanía Bernal Martínez	Juárez	-	Miss Congeniality	Competed at Señorita UANL 2014
2017	Mariana González Nava	Monterrey	Top 16	Head to Head	-
2016	Mariel Mátar Herrera (Resigned)	San Pedro	Did not Compete	-	-
2016	Andrea Garza Méndez (Assumed)	San Nicolás	-	-	2nd Runner-up at Miss Nuevo León 2016; Top 5 at Señorita UANL 2015; Señorita FOD 2015

== See also ==
- Mexicana Universal Nuevo León
- Miss Earth Nuevo León
