= Lorena Sevilla =

Mexican model (born 1991)

- Born: Lorena Marlene Sevilla Mesina; April 16, 1991 (age 35); Colima, Colima, Mexico
- Occupations: Model; Actress
- Height: 1.76 m (5 ft 9 1/2 in)
- Beauty pageant titleholder
- Hair color: Black
- Eye color: Hazel
- Major competitions: Nuestra Belleza Colima 2014 (Winner); Nuestra Belleza México 2014 (3rd Runner-up) (Nuestra Belleza Int'l México); Miss International 2015 (Top 10); Miss Universe Mexico 2024 (3rd Runner-up)

Lorena Marlene Sevilla Mesina (born April 16, 1991) is a Mexican model, actress and beauty queen who was crowned Nuestra Belleza Interncional México 2015. She represented Mexico at Miss International 2015 and finished in the Top 10.

== Pageant career ==
=== Nuestra Belleza México 2014 ===
On October 25, 2014, Sevilla participated in the Nuestra Belleza México 2014 pageant held at the Jardines de México in Jojutla, Morelos. At the end of the event, Sevilla was announced as the third runner-up and following the coronation, she was crowned Nuestra Belleza Internacional México.

=== Miss International 2015 ===
As the winner of Nuestra Belleza Internacional México, Sevilla represented Mexico at Miss International 2015, held at the Grand Prince Hotel Takanawa in Tokyo, Japan on November 5, 2015. At the end of the event, Sevilla placed in the Top 10 finalists.

=== Miss Universe Mexico 2024 ===
On September 7, 2024, Sevilla was appointed as Miss Universe Colima titleholder, marking her second attempt at securing the national title. Leading up to the competition, she was considered a "heavy favorite" to win. At the end of the event, Sevilla was announced as the third runner-up.

Awards and achievements
Preceded by First	Miss Universe Colima; 2024	Succeeded by Marcela Corona
Preceded by Vianey Vázquez	Nuestra Belleza Int'l México; 2015	Succeeded by Geraldine Ponce
Preceded by Karen Arceo	Nuestra Belleza Colima; 2014	Succeeded by Giovanna Salazar
