= Miss Earth México 2017 =

- Presenters: Lupita Jones, Jaime Camil, Marisol González
- Venue: Tuxtla Gutierrez, Chiapas
- Broadcaster: Azteca América, Unicable, Telemundo
- Entrants: 32
- Placements: 16
- Winner: Karen Bustos

The 16th annual Miss Earth México pageant was held at Cancún on Quintana Roo. Thirty-two contestants of the Mexican Republic competed for the national title, which was won by Karen Bustos from San Luis Potosí who later competed in Miss Earth 2017 in the Philippines where she placed 28th. Karen Bustos was crowned by outgoing Miss Earth México titleholder Itzel Astudillo.

== Results ==
=== Miss Earth México ===
Final results	Contestant
Miss Earth México 2017	(San Luis Potosí) San Luis Potosí - Karen Bustos
Miss Earth Air 2017	(Hidalgo (state)) Hidalgo - Mara Orduño
Miss Earth Water 2017	(State of Mexico) Estado de México - Brenda Portelinha
Miss Earth Fire 2017	(Baja California) Baja California - Diana García
TOP 8	(Chiapas) Chiapas - Eloisa Moral (Colima) Colima - Alondra Sandoval (Jalisco) Jalisco - Yara Gusmán (Sinaloa) Sinaloa - Nataly Beltrán

=== Special awards ===
Miss Friendship:

- Guanajuato, Diana Guzmán

Miss Photogeny:

- San Luis Potosí, Yuridia Vázquez

Miss National Costume:

- Jalisco, Yolanda Monroy

Miss Talent:

- Oaxaca, Iroshka Montes

Miss Digital:

- Tamaulipas, Arlette Martínez

Miss Direct Pass★:

- Zacatecas, Danna González

== Expected Contestants ==
State	Contestant	Age	Height	Hometown
Aguascalientes	Guadalupe López	21	1.74	Aguascalientes City
Baja California	Diana García	23	1.68	Mexicali
Baja California Sur	Natalia Matteotti	20	1.70	Los Cabos
Campeche	Rosa Vergara	19	1.76	Campeche City
Chiapas	Miranda Jiménez	22	1.70	Tuxtla Gutiérrez
Chihuahua	Dayra Cisneros	20	1.85	Chihuahua
Coahuila	Telliz Rodríguez	23	1.68	Saltillo
Colima	Eva Velazquez	27	1.71	Manzanillo
(Mexico City) Distrito Federal	Naomi Morales	20	1.72	Tláhuac
Durango	Judith González	19	1.72	Durango
(State of Mexico) Estado de México	Fernanda Arteaga	24	1.73	Teotihuacan
Guanajuato	Diana Guzmán	21	1.75	Ocampo
Guerrero	Karla García	24	1.76	Acapulco
Hidalgo	Mireya Rios	23	1.72	Mineral de la Reforma
Jalisco	Yolanda Monroy	24	1.79	Autlán
Michoacán	Esmeralda Jiménez	18	1.78	Uruapan
Morelos	Cassandra Fernández	23	1.74	Cuernavaca
Nayarit	Yoselin Cosio Gómez	19	1.73	Ahuacatlán
Oaxaca	Iroshka Montes	24	1.74	Pinotepa Nacional
Puebla	Liliana Ortíz	26	1.73	Tehuacán
Querétaro	Estela Salazar	25	1.78	Querétaro City
Quintana Roo	Natalia Soto	18	1.78	Cancún
San Luis Potosí	Yuridia Vazquez	19	1.76	San Luis Potosí City
Sinaloa	Karen Leal	27	1.73	Mazatlán
Sonora	Irma Arellano	25	1.77	Hermosillo
Tabasco	Claudia Ruiz	20	1.73	Ciudad del Carmen
Tamaulipas	Arlette Martínez	22	1.74	Reynosa
Tlaxcala	Melani Gonzalez	20	1.73	Tlaxcala City
Veracruz	Viviana Reyes	24	1.72	Coatzacoalcos
Yucatán	Daniela Cosx	24	1.70	Mérida
Zacatecas	Danae Gonzalez	21	1.75	Zacatecas City
