= Jaydy Michel =

Mexican actress and fashion model (born 1973)

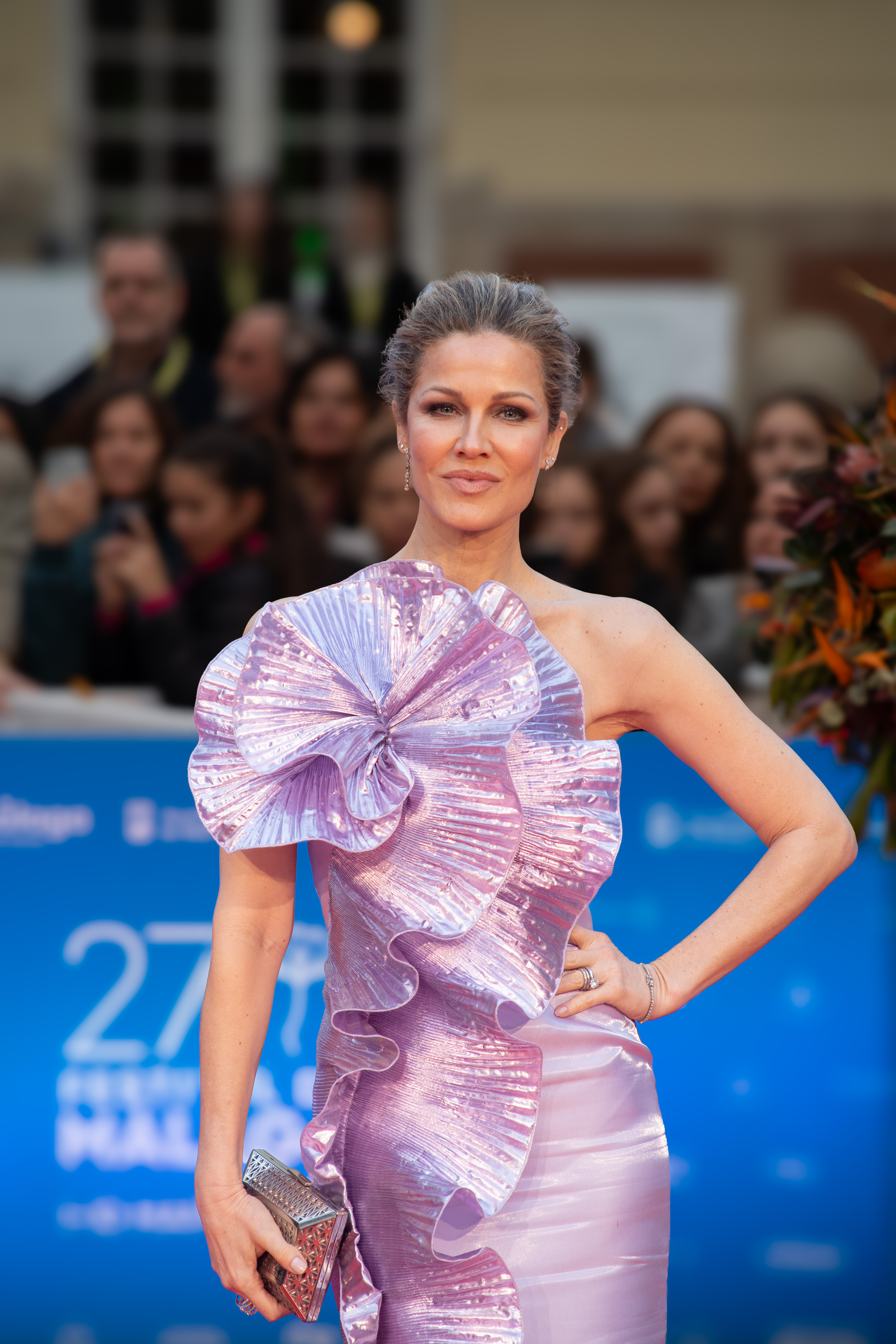
- Michel in 2024
- Born: Jaydy Michel Brixon; December 20, 1975 (age 50); Guadalajara, Jalisco, Mexico
- Occupations: Actress, fashion model
- Spouses: Alejandro Sanz (m. 1999; div. 2005); Rafa Márquez (m. 2011)

Jaydy Michel Brixon (Spanish pronunciation: [ˈɟʝejði miˈtʃel]; born December 20, 1975) is a Mexican actress and fashion model.

== Early life ==
Jaidy Michel was born in Guadalajara, Jalisco, on December 20, 1975, to a Mexican father and an American mother. She grew up in Puerto Vallarta.

== Career ==
A friend of her mother recommended that she go to Europe. Michel went to Spain in 1994, beginning her career as an international model. Since then, she has been featured in many top magazines and fashion shows, both in Mexico and Europe.

She made her film debut as an actress in Isi/Disi (2004), starring alongside Santiago Segura and Florentino Fernández.

In 2007, she started working in the Spanish series Los Serrano, until its end in 2008. She played the role of an English teacher named Celia, replacing the deceased Lucía.

In 2013, she began hosting the fourth season of Mexico's Next Top Model.

== Personal life ==
Michel and Spanish singer Alejandro Sanz married in Bali on December 30, 1999. The couple divorced in 2005. On January 4, 2011, she married Mexican international football player Rafael Márquez on the beach in Manzanillo, Colima, Mexico and had one child named Leonardo Márquez Michel (born 2016).
