= Nuestra Belleza Nuevo León 2013 =

- Date: July 16, 2013
- Presenters: Pablo Lyle, Alejandra Quintero, Priscila Perales, Anagabriela Espinoza
- Entertainment: Río Roma, Samo, Paty Cantú
- Venue: Las Lomas Eventos, Monterrey, Nuevo León
- Broadcaster: Televisa
- Producer: Fernando E. de León Ayala
- Entrants: 8
- Placements: 4
- Winner: Vanessa Montemayor; Guadalupe

Nuestra Belleza Nuevo León 2013, a beauty pageant in Mexico, was held at Las Lomas Eventos in Monterrey, Nuevo León on July 16, 2013. At the conclusion of the final night of competition Vanesa Montemayr from Guadalupe was crowned the winner. Montemayor was crowned by outgoing Nuestra Belleza Nuevo León and Nuestra Belleza México titleholderCynthia Duque. Eight contestants competed for the title.

== Results ==
=== Placements ===
Final results	Contestant
Nuestra Belleza Nuevo León 2013	Guadalupe - Vanesa Montemayor
Suplente / 1st Runner-up	San Nicolás - María Fernanda Villaseñor
2nd Runner-up	San Nicolás -Mariana Peña
3rd Runner-up	Monterrey -Sugheidy Willie

=== Special awards ===
Award	Contestant
Miss Elegance	Vanessa Montemayor
Miss Sports	Yazmín García

== Judges ==
- Laura Elizondo - Nuestra Belleza México 2004
- Jauma Mateu - Actor
- Silvia Galván - Image Designer
- Vero Solís - Fashion Designer
- Felipe Ríos - IHG México Vicepresident
- Ana Laura Corral - National Coordinator of Nuestra Belleza México
- Dr. Jorge Torales

== Background Music ==
- Samo
- Paty Cantú
- Río Roma

== Contestants ==
Hometown	Contestant	Age	Height (m)
Guadalupe	Elsa Cecilia Chapa Rodríguez	22	1.76
Guadalupe	Vanesa Montemayor Cortéz	19	1.75
Monterrey	Graciela Judith García Yves	21	1.71
Monterrey	Norma Guadalupe Álvarez Coronado (Resigned)	19	1.74
Monterrey	Sugheidy Yasmín Willie Sauceda	23	1.71
Monterrey	Yasmín García Pedro	19	1.81
San Nicolás	Mariana Alejandra Peña Cisneros	19	1.70
San Nicolás	María Fernanda Villaseñor Múzquiz	23	1.82
San Nicolás	Selma Victoria Alpuing Salinas	23	1.68
San Pedro	Claudia Lozano Domínguez (Resigned)	19	1.80
