= Mariana Bayón =

Mexican model

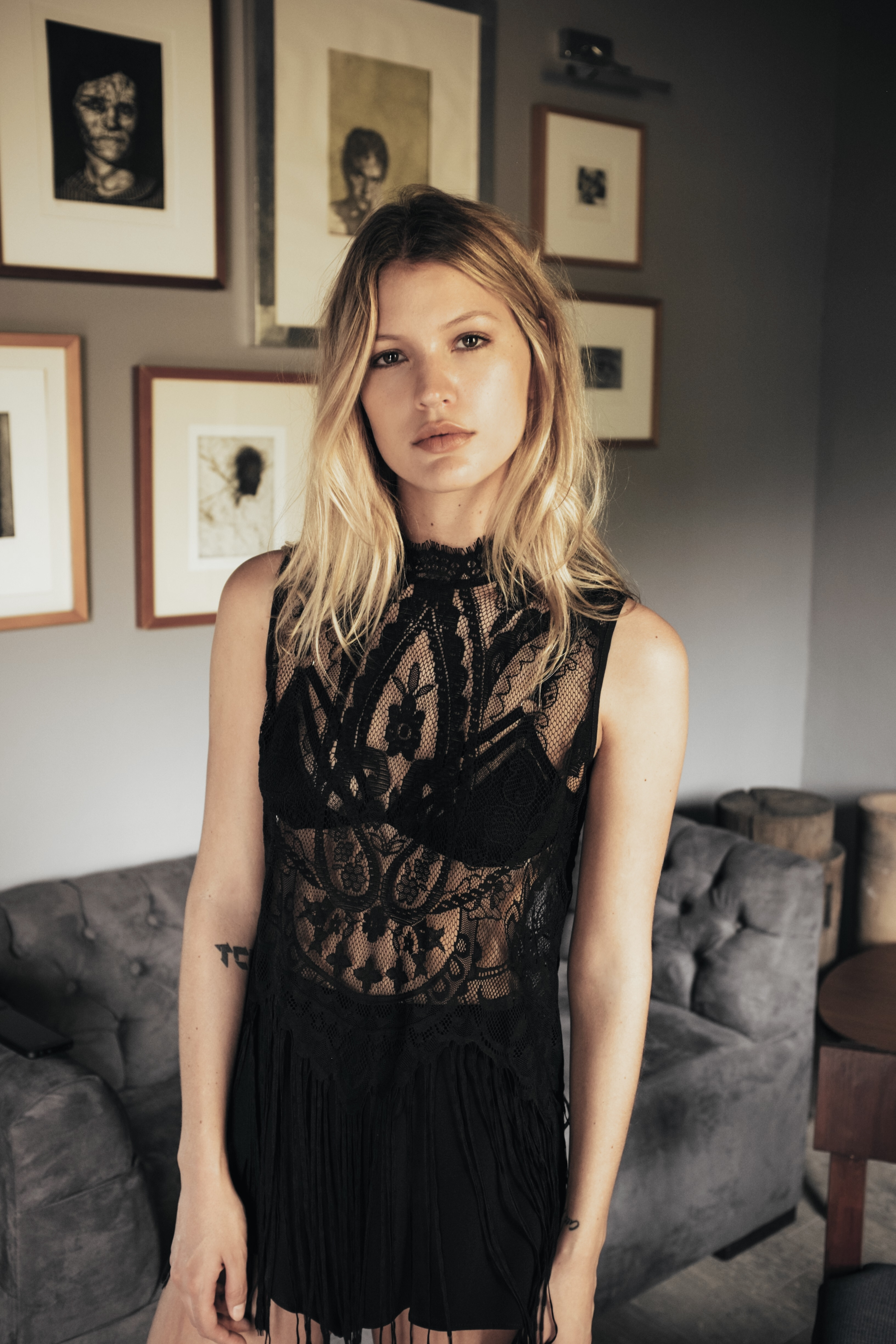
- Mariana Bayón in 2014
- Born: February 14, 1991 (age 35); Torreón, Coahuila, México
- Years active: 2009–
- Modeling information
- Height: 5 ft 10 in (1.78 m)
- Hair color: Brown
- Eye color: Hazel
- Agency: Shock Modeling(Mexico); Modelwerk (Germany); Nevs (UK); Wilhelmina (Miami/NY)

Mariana Bayón (born February 14, 1991, in Torreón, Coahuila) is a Mexican model, best known for winning the first cycle of Mexico's Next Top Model, hosted by Elsa Benítez.

== Early life ==
At age eight, her ten-year-old sister Maria Rosa died of cancer, and her parents divorced six months later. Prior to entering Mexico's Next Top Model, Bayón began modeling locally in her hometown. She is an avid soccer player.

== Modeling ==
As the winner of Mexico's Next Top Model, Bayón received a US$100,000 contract and representation by Shock Modeling—one of the top modeling agencies in the country, and a cover and editorial in the Mexican edition of Glamour magazine. In addition, she obtained a trip to London and San Francisco, courtesy of Sedal and Volaris, respectively, and a MXN$20,000 gift card by Sears.

In late February, came to light that Bayón had signed a contract with a renowned German modeling agency called Model Werk, however, her mother agency remains Shock Modeling. On March 4, modeled for the presentation of Fashion Fest sponsored by the department store chain Liverpool. She is the face of Mercedes-Benz Fashion Mexico 2010.

She featured in Alejandro Fernández's music video "Me hace tanto bien".
