= Óscar Madrazo =

Mexican actor

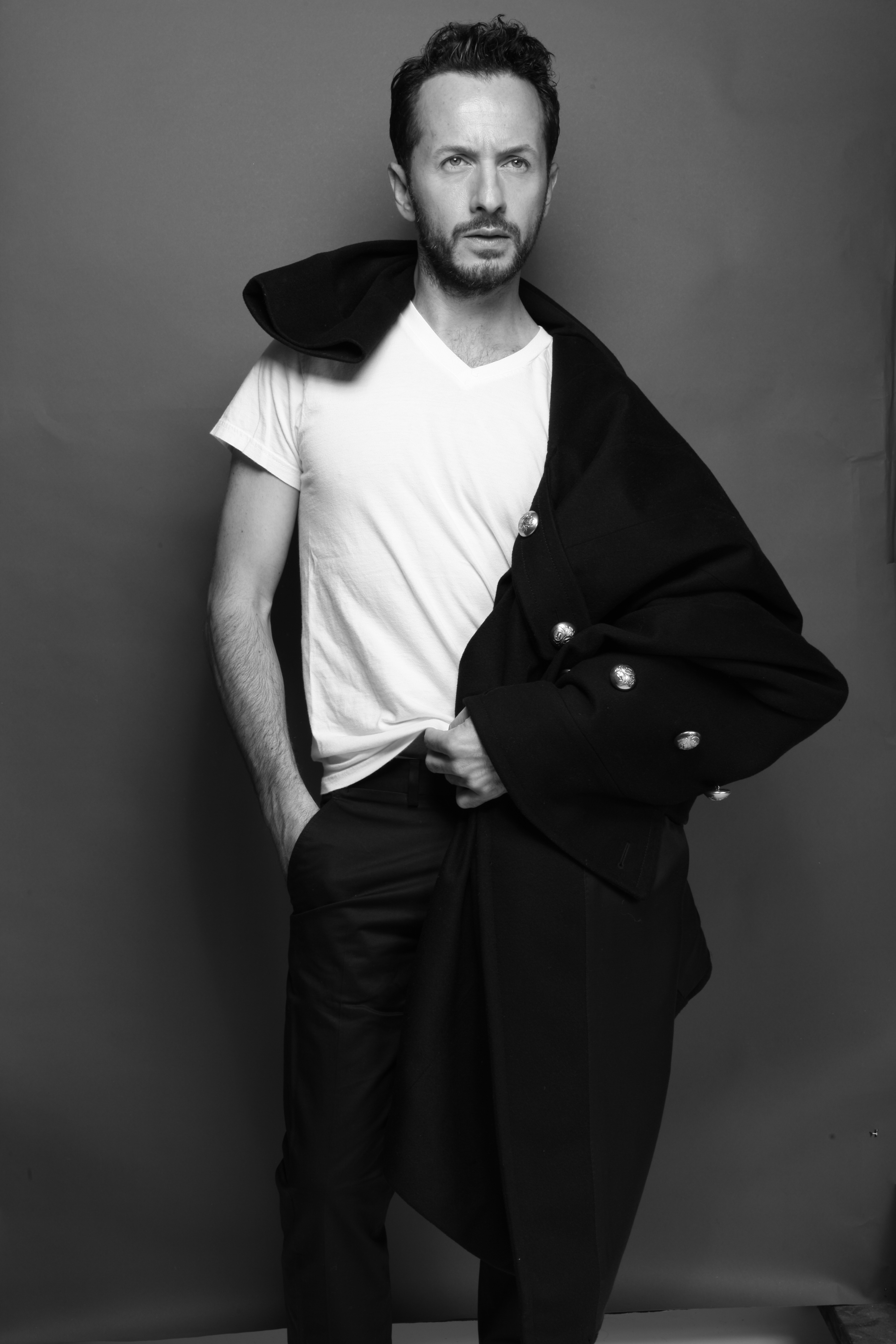

Óscar Madrazo is a Mexican actor. He is a judge on Drag Race México and was previously a judge on Mexico's Next Top Model.

== Filmography ==
- Mexico's Next Top Model
- Drag Race México
