= Sony Channel (Latin America) =

Latin American pay television channel

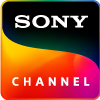
- Country: United States
- Broadcast area: Latin America
- Headquarters: Culver City, California

Programming
- Languages: Spanish; Portuguese; English
- Picture format: 1080i HDTV (downscaled to 16:9 480i/576i for the channel's SDTV feeds)

Ownership
- Owner: Sony Pictures Entertainment (distributed by Ole Distribution)
- Sister channels: AXN; Sony Movies

History
- Launched: 20 September 1995 (Latin America); March 1996 (Mexico); 4 September 1996 (Brazil)
- Former names: Sony Entertainment Television (1995–2014); Canal Sony (2014–2019)

Links
- Website: Latin America; Brazil

Sony Channel (commonly referred to on-air as Sony) is a Latin American pay television channel that broadcasts TV series and movies. It is owned by Sony Pictures Entertainment and distributed by Ole Distribution. It was the first pan-regional basic-tier channel that offered programming in English with Spanish subtitles.

== History ==
Sony Channel was launched in August 1995 as Sony Entertainment Television, a basic cable television channel. In Mexico, it was first available on Televisa's Cablevisión cable TV system in March 1996 followed by its launch in Brazil that same year. Unlike most television networks in Latin America, which air all imported shows dubbed in Spanish or Portuguese, Sony started airing its programming with subtitles, which led to its role as a regional TV leader.

In 2011, the Sony Pictures channels in Brazil gained greater autonomy from the Spanish-language feeds, and as part of that, it was announced that CSI: Crime Scene Investigation would return to Canal Sony in Brazil, while in the rest of the region, that show remained airing on AXN. In October 2011, CSI: Miami was picked up by Sony Channel Brazil.

In 2015, HBO Latin America (now Ole Distribution) switched from subtitles to dubbing in most of its channels, including Sony and AXN, which has caused some criticism among viewers. The networks appeal to its users to use the channel's SAP audio track to view programming in its original language.

== Logos ==
Sony Entertainment Television (1995–2007)

Sony Entertainment Television (2007–2014)

Canal Sony (2014–2019)

Sony Channel (2019–2023)

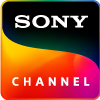
Sony Channel (2023–present)

Horizontal Logo
