= Elsa Benítez =

Mexican model and television presenter

- Born: Elsa Benítez Yáñez; December 8, 1977 (age 48); Hermosillo, Sonora, Mexico
- Spouse: Rony Seikaly (m. 1999; div. 2005)
- Children: 1
- Modeling information
- Height: 1.78 m (5 ft 10 in)
- Hair color: Brown
- Eye color: Hazel
- Agency: Front Management (Miami); Modelink (Stockholm)

Elsa Benítez Yáñez (Latin American Spanish pronunciation: [ˈelsa βeˈnites]; born December 8, 1977) is a Mexican model and television presenter, perhaps best known for her appearances in the Sports Illustrated Swimsuit Issue, including her appearance on the cover in 2001.

== Career ==
Benítez became a model after winning a modeling contest in Costa Rica in 1995. Her early opportunities were soon marching to local firms in Mexico and later in the United States where she earned more recognition and with it, her move to Europe. In 1996 she obtained one of her best chances when chosen to appear in one of the major fashion magazines: Vogue Italia, once accepted, she was on the cover of the Journal for three consecutive months.

After being hired by Elite agency, she began appearing on the cover of many magazines like Vogue, Elle, Glamour, Mademoiselle, Harper's Bazaar and Marie Claire. After appearing on the cover of Vogue from various countries such as Mexico, Greece, Germany, and Marie Claire in several numbers, Benítez received the offer that would launch success and worldwide recognition to any model: US magazine Sports Illustrated.

After arriving in Europe, specifically in France and Italy, participating in fashion, presenting collections of top designers; starts on runways prêt-à-porter becoming the muse of Dolce & Gabbana Italian house for which she starred in their shows and marketing campaigns.

She also paraded on runways and/or campaigns for Chanel, Valentino, Christian Lacroix, Versace, Fendi, Christian Dior, Pierre Balmain, Karl Lagerfeld, John Galliano, Gianfranco Ferré, MaxMara, Salvatore Ferragamo, Chloé, Escada, Emanuel Ungaro, Massimo Dutti and in the U.S. for Carolina Herrera and Oscar de la Renta, Anna Sui, and CoverGirl.

Benítez is perhaps the only model that has marched in Latin Couture during her stay in Paris. She marched for some of the most important fashion houses presenting Haute Couture, which have always been a few of the significant work involved in this fraction fashion, so Benítez walked for Chanel, Christian Dior, Christian Lacroix, Pierre Balmain, Emanuel Ungaro and Versace.

She has worked for the houses Macy's, Episode, INC, J.Crew, Rena Lange, Nine West and Jones New York. Benítez has also modeled for Victoria's Secret.

Benítez appeared in the 1999 Pirelli calendar showing women through the decades. She was photographed as representative of the "groovy" in the 1970s. In 2002, she appeared in the music video for "Love to See You Cry" by Enrique Iglesias.

From 2009 to 2012, Benítez presented Mexico's Next Top Model.

== Personal life ==
In 1999, Benítez married former basketball player Rony Seikaly. In 2003, they had a daughter named Mila. She divorced him in 2005. She later had a romantic relationship for several months with Mexican businessman Roberto Slim. In February 2007, Benítez started dating producer, Valerio Morabito. Benítez currently resides in Santa Monica, California.

In the 2004 swimsuit issue of Sports Illustrated magazine, Elsa Benítez spoke about nearly boarding doomed TWA Flight 800 on July 17, 1996: "I was scheduled to be on TWA Flight 800. I got to the airport and I just had a bad feeling. I started crying, and I couldn't stop. I called my husband and said, "I feel something is going to happen on the flight." He said, "Don't worry." I said, "No, something is going to happen." He told me to wait 10 minutes and if I still had the same feeling, I should change the ticket. I couldn't stop crying, so I bought a ticket for another flight and took off 10 minutes after that flight did. It made me appreciate so much that just being alive is a gift."
