= List of Miss Universe editions =

This is a list of Miss Universe editions and host countries or territories since the inaugural edition of the competition in 1952 to the present.

== Editions ==
This list includes the winner, date, venue, and host country or territory, and total entrants of each Miss Universe edition since the inaugural edition in 1952.

Year	Edition	Winner	Date	Venue	Host country or territory	Entrants
1952	1st	Finland	June 28, 1952	Long Beach Municipal Auditorium, Long Beach, California	United States	30
1953	2nd	France	July 17, 1953	Long Beach Municipal Auditorium, Long Beach, California	United States	26
1954	3rd	United States	July 24, 1954	Long Beach Municipal Auditorium, Long Beach, California	United States	33
1955	4th	Sweden	July 22, 1955	Long Beach Municipal Auditorium, Long Beach, California	United States	33
1956	5th	United States	July 20, 1956	Long Beach Municipal Auditorium, Long Beach, California	United States	30
1957	6th	Peru	July 19, 1957	Long Beach Municipal Auditorium, Long Beach, California	United States	32
1958	7th	Colombia	July 26, 1958	Long Beach Municipal Auditorium, Long Beach, California	United States	36
1959	8th	Japan	July 24, 1959	Long Beach Municipal Auditorium, Long Beach, California	United States	34
1960	9th	United States	July 9, 1960	Miami Beach Auditorium, Miami Beach, Florida	United States	43
1961	10th	Germany	July 15, 1961	Miami Beach Auditorium, Miami Beach, Florida	United States	48
1962	11th	Argentina	July 14, 1962	Miami Beach Auditorium, Miami Beach, Florida	United States	52
1963	12th	Brazil	July 20, 1963	Miami Beach Auditorium, Miami Beach, Florida	United States	50
1964	13th	Greece	August 1, 1964	Miami Beach Auditorium, Miami Beach, Florida	United States	60
1965	14th	Thailand	July 24, 1965	Miami Beach Auditorium, Miami Beach, Florida	United States	56
1966	15th	Sweden	July 16, 1966	Miami Beach Auditorium, Miami Beach, Florida	United States	58
1967	16th	United States	July 15, 1967	Miami Beach Auditorium, Miami Beach, Florida	United States	56
1968	17th	Brazil	July 13, 1968	Miami Beach Auditorium, Miami Beach, Florida	United States	65
1969	18th	Philippines	July 19, 1969	Miami Beach Auditorium, Miami Beach, Florida	United States	61
1970	19th	Puerto Rico	July 11, 1970	Miami Beach Auditorium, Miami Beach, Florida	United States	64
1971	20th	Lebanon	July 24, 1971	Miami Beach Auditorium, Miami Beach, Florida	United States	60
1972	21st	Australia	July 29, 1972	Cerromar Beach Hotel, Dorado	Puerto Rico	61
1973	22nd	Philippines	July 21, 1973	Theatre of Herod Atticus, Athens	Greece	61
1974	23rd	Spain	July 21, 1974	Folk Arts Theater, Malate, City of Manila	Philippines	65
1975	24th	Finland	July 19, 1975	Gimnasio Nacional José Adolfo Pineda, San Salvador	El Salvador	71
1976	25th	Israel	July 11, 1976	Lee Theatre, Causeway Bay	Hong Kong	72
1977	26th	Trinidad and Tobago	July 16, 1977	Teatro Nacional, Santo Domingo	Dominican Republic	80
1978	27th	South Africa	July 24, 1978	Centro de Convenciones de Acapulco, Acapulco, Guerrero	Mexico	75
1979	28th	Venezuela	July 20, 1979	Perth Entertainment Centre, Perth, Western Australia	Australia	75
1980	29th	United States	July 8, 1980	Sejong Cultural Center, Seoul	South Korea	69
1981	30th	Venezuela	July 20, 1981	Minskoff Theatre, New York City, New York	United States	76
1982	31st	Canada	July 26, 1982	Coliseo Amauta, Lima	Peru	77
1983	32nd	New Zealand	July 11, 1983	Kiel Auditorium, St. Louis, Missouri	United States	80
1984	33rd	Sweden	July 9, 1984	James L. Knight Center, Miami, Florida	United States	81
1985	34th	Puerto Rico	July 15, 1985	James L. Knight Center, Miami, Florida	United States	79
1986	35th	Venezuela	July 21, 1986	Atlapa Convention Centre, Panama City	Panama	77
1987	36th	Chile	May 27, 1987	Singapore World Trade Centre	Singapore	68
1988	37th	Thailand	May 24, 1988	Linkou Stadium, Taipei	Taiwan	66
1989	38th	Netherlands	May 23, 1989	Fiesta Americana Condesa Hotel, Cancún, Quintana Roo	Mexico	76
1990	39th	Norway	April 15, 1990	Shubert Theatre, Los Angeles, California	United States	71
1991	40th	Mexico	May 17, 1991	Aladdin Theatre for the Performing Arts, Las Vegas, Nevada	United States	73
1992	41st	Namibia	May 8, 1992	Queen Sirikit International Convention Center, Bangkok	Thailand	78
1993	42nd	Puerto Rico	May 21, 1993	National Auditorium, Mexico City	Mexico	79
1994	43rd	India	May 21, 1994	Philippine International Convention Center, Pasay, Metro Manila	Philippines	77
1995	44th	United States	May 12, 1995	Windhoek Country Club Resort, Windhoek	Namibia	82
1996	45th	Venezuela	May 17, 1996	Aladdin Theatre for the Performing Arts, Paradise, Nevada (Note: Originally scheduled to be held in Johannesburg, South Africa, but was moved to the United States.)	United States	79
1997	46th	United States	May 16, 1997	Miami Beach Convention Center, Miami Beach, Florida	United States	74
1998	47th	Trinidad and Tobago	May 12, 1998	Stan Sheriff Arena, Honolulu, Hawaii	United States	81
1999	48th	Botswana	May 26, 1999	Chaguaramas Convention Centre, Chaguaramas	Trinidad and Tobago	84
2000	49th	India	May 12, 2000	Eleftheria Indoor Hall, Nicosia	Cyprus	79
2001	50th	Puerto Rico	May 11, 2001	Coliseo Rubén Rodríguez, Bayamón	Puerto Rico	77
2002	51st	Russia (terminated)	May 29, 2002	Roberto Clemente Coliseum, San Juan	Puerto Rico	75
2002	51st	Panama (assumed)	May 29, 2002	Roberto Clemente Coliseum, San Juan	Puerto Rico	75
2003	52nd	Dominican Republic	June 3, 2003	Figali Convention Center, Panama City	Panama	71
2004	53rd	Australia	June 1, 2004	CEMEXPO, Quito	Ecuador	80
2005	54th	Canada	May 31, 2005	Impact Arena, Muang Thong Thani, Pak Kret, Nonthaburi	Thailand	81
2006	55th	Puerto Rico	July 23, 2006	Shrine Auditorium, Los Angeles, California	United States	86
2007	56th	Japan	May 28, 2007	Auditorio Nacional, Mexico City	Mexico	77
2008	57th	Venezuela	July 14, 2008	Crown Convention Center, Nha Trang	Vietnam	80
2009	58th	Venezuela	August 23, 2009	Imperial Ballroom, Atlantis Paradise Island, Nassau	Bahamas	83
2010	59th	Mexico	August 23, 2010	Mandalay Bay Events Center, Las Vegas, Nevada	United States	83
2011	60th	Angola	September 12, 2011	Credicard Hall, São Paulo	Brazil	89
2012	61st	United States	December 19, 2012	Zappos Theater, Las Vegas, Nevada	United States	89
2013	62nd	Venezuela	November 9, 2013	Crocus City Hall, Krasnogorsk, Moscow	Russia	86
2014	63rd	Colombia	January 25, 2015	FIU Arena, University Park, Florida	United States	88
2015	64th	Philippines	December 20, 2015	Zappos Theater, Las Vegas, Nevada	United States	80
2016	65th	France	January 30, 2017	SM Mall of Asia Arena, Pasay, Metro Manila	Philippines	86
2017	66th	South Africa	November 26, 2017	Zappos Theater, Las Vegas, Nevada	United States	92
2018	67th	Philippines	December 17, 2018	Impact, Muang Thong Thani, Pak Kret, Nonthaburi	Thailand	94
2019	68th	South Africa	December 8, 2019	Tyler Perry Studios, Atlanta, Georgia	United States	90
2020	69th	Mexico	May 16, 2021	Seminole Hard Rock Hotel & Casino, Hollywood, Florida	United States	74
2021	70th	India	December 13, 2021	Universe Dome, Eilat, Southern District	Israel	80
2022	71st	United States	January 14, 2023	New Orleans Morial Convention Center, New Orleans, Louisiana	United States	83
2023	72nd	Nicaragua	November 18, 2023	José Adolfo Pineda Arena, San Salvador	El Salvador	84
2024	73rd	Denmark	November 16, 2024	Arena CDMX, Mexico City	Mexico	125
2025	74th	Mexico	November 21, 2025	Impact, Muang Thong Thani, Pak Kret, Nonthaburi	Thailand	118
2026	75th	TBA	November 24, 2026	José Miguel Agrelot Coliseum, San Juan	Puerto Rico	116

== Editions by host country or territory ==
This list includes the editions of Miss Universe by host country or territory in ascending order.

Country/territory	Edition	Year
United States	38	1952–1971, 1981, 1983–1985, 1990, 1991, 1996–1998, 2006, 2010, 2012, 2014–2015, 2017, 2019–2020, 2022
Mexico	5	1978, 1989, 1993, 2007, 2024
Puerto Rico	4	1972, 2001–2002, 2026
Thailand	4	1992, 2005, 2018, 2025
Philippines	3	1974, 1994, 2016
El Salvador	2	1975, 2023
Panama	2	1986, 2003
Israel	1	2021
Russia	1	2013
Brazil	1	2011
Bahamas	1	2009
Vietnam	1	2008
Ecuador	1	2004
Cyprus	1	2000
Trinidad and Tobago	1	1999
Namibia	1	1995
Taiwan	1	1988
Singapore	1	1987
Peru	1	1982
South Korea	1	1980
Australia	1	1979
Dominican Republic	1	1977
Hong Kong	1	1976
Greece	1	1973

== Editions by host cities ==
This map includes the host cities of the editions of Miss Universe by year.

Miss Universe host cities

== See also ==
- List of Miss Universe titleholders
