= Señorita Panamá 2001 =

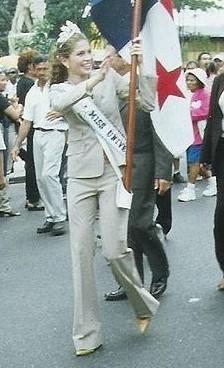
- Justine Pasek Señorita Panamá 2001
- Date: August 30, 2001
- Presenters: Carlos Mastellari; Madelaine Legnadier
- Entertainment: Eduardo Verástegui; Ulpiano Vergara; Juliette Roy
- Venue: Gran Salón Hotel Continental, Panama City, Panama
- Broadcaster: RPC Televisión
- Entrants: 12
- Winner: Justine Pasek; Panamá Centro

Señorita Panamá 2001 was the 19th Señorita Panamá pageant and 36th celebration of the Miss Panamá contest, held at the Grand Ballroom of the Riande Continental Hotel, in Panama City, Panama, on August 30, 2001. The winner of the pageant was Justine Pasek later Miss Universe 2002.

The pageant was broadcast on September 10 through RPC Televisión Channel 4. 12 contestants from all over Panama competed for the prestigious crown. At the conclusion of the final night of competition, outgoing titleholder Ivette Cordovez Usuga of Panamá Centro crowned Justine Pasek of Panamá Centro as the new Señorita Panamá.

In the same night was celebrated the election of the "Señorita Panamá World", was announced the winner of the Señorita Panamá Mundo title. Señorita Panamá World 2000 Ana Raquel Ochy Pozo of Coclé crowned Lourdes Cristina González Montenegro of Los Santos as the new Señorita Panamá World.

Pasek competed in the Miss Universe 2002 pageant, held at the Coliseo Roberto Clemente, in San Juan, Puerto Rico on May 29, 2002. She became the first woman to assume the title of Miss Universe when the Miss Universe Organization revoked the crown from then-reigning winner Oxana Fedorova for not fulfilling the duties stipulated in her contract. She was formally crowned Miss Universe 2002 by pageant co-owner Donald Trump in New York City.

In other hands González competed in Miss World 2001, the 51st edition of the Miss World pageant, was held on 16 November 2001 at the Super Bowl of Sun City Entertainment Centre in Sun City, South Africa.

== Results ==
=== Placements ===
Placement	Contestant
Señorita Panamá 2001	Panama City – Justine Pasek
Señorita Panamá World 2001	Los Santos – Lourdes González
1st Runner-Up	Panama City – Carolina Troncoso Thayer
2nd Runner-Up	Panama City – Melissa Bocharel
3rd Runner-Up	Panama City – Karyn Sempf

=== Special awards ===
Final results	Designer	Topic
Best National Costume to Miss Universe	Horacio Prado	Princesa Zaratí
Best National Costume to Miss World	José Luis González	Aguila Harpía

Award	Contestant
Miss Congeniality	Melissa del Carmen Bocharel
Miss Photogenic	Melissa del Carmen Bocharel

== Contestants ==
These are the competitors who have been selected this year.

Represent	Contestant	Age	Height (m)	Hometown	Sponsor
Panamá Centro	Justine Lissette Pasek Patiño	22	1.72	Panama City	Yogurt Vita Slim
Panamá Centro	Karin Natalie Sempf Kahn	22	1.75	Panama City	Zero Frizz
Panamá Centro	Bertha Giovanna Peric Torres	23	1.78	Panama City	Coca-Cola Light
Los Santos	Lilibeth Yanina Camaño Frías	23	1.76	Guararé	Figali
Panamá Centro	Melissa del Carmen Bocharel	25	1.68	Panama City	Saba
Los Santos	Jessica Doralis Segui Barrios	20	1.70	Los Santos	Muebleria Ancon
Veraguas	Katherine Massiel Quirós Vásquez	20	1.71	Santiago	Jabon Class
Los Santos	Lourdes Cristina González Montenegro	21	1.73	Las Tablas	L'oreal
Coclé	Beatriz del Carmen Nogueira Domínguez	18	1.70	Penonomé	Mistolin
Panamá Centro	Carolina del Carmen Troncoso Thayer	19	1.74	Panama City	Skoda
Panamá Centro	Melina Franco Fonseca	24	1.75	Panama City	Max Factor
Chiriquí	Yulín Sinara Guerra Sanjur	18	1.80	David	Kellogg's

== Election schedule ==
- Thursday August 30 Final night, coronation of Señorita Panamá 2001

== Contestant notes ==
- Justine Pasek became Miss Universe 2002 and was formally crowned by pageant co-owner Donald Trump in New York City on September 24, 2002.
- Bertha Peric Torres won Miss Atlantic International 2005 in Punte del Este, Uruguay.
- Jessica Segui Barrios competed in Miss Earth 2003 as Miss Earth Panamá 2003 and won the Best National Costume. On September 27, 2010, Jessica Segui died in a Panamanian hospital due to cerebral aneurysm.
