= Oxana Fedorova =

Russian beauty pageant winner

Oksana Fedorova
- Оксана Фёдорова
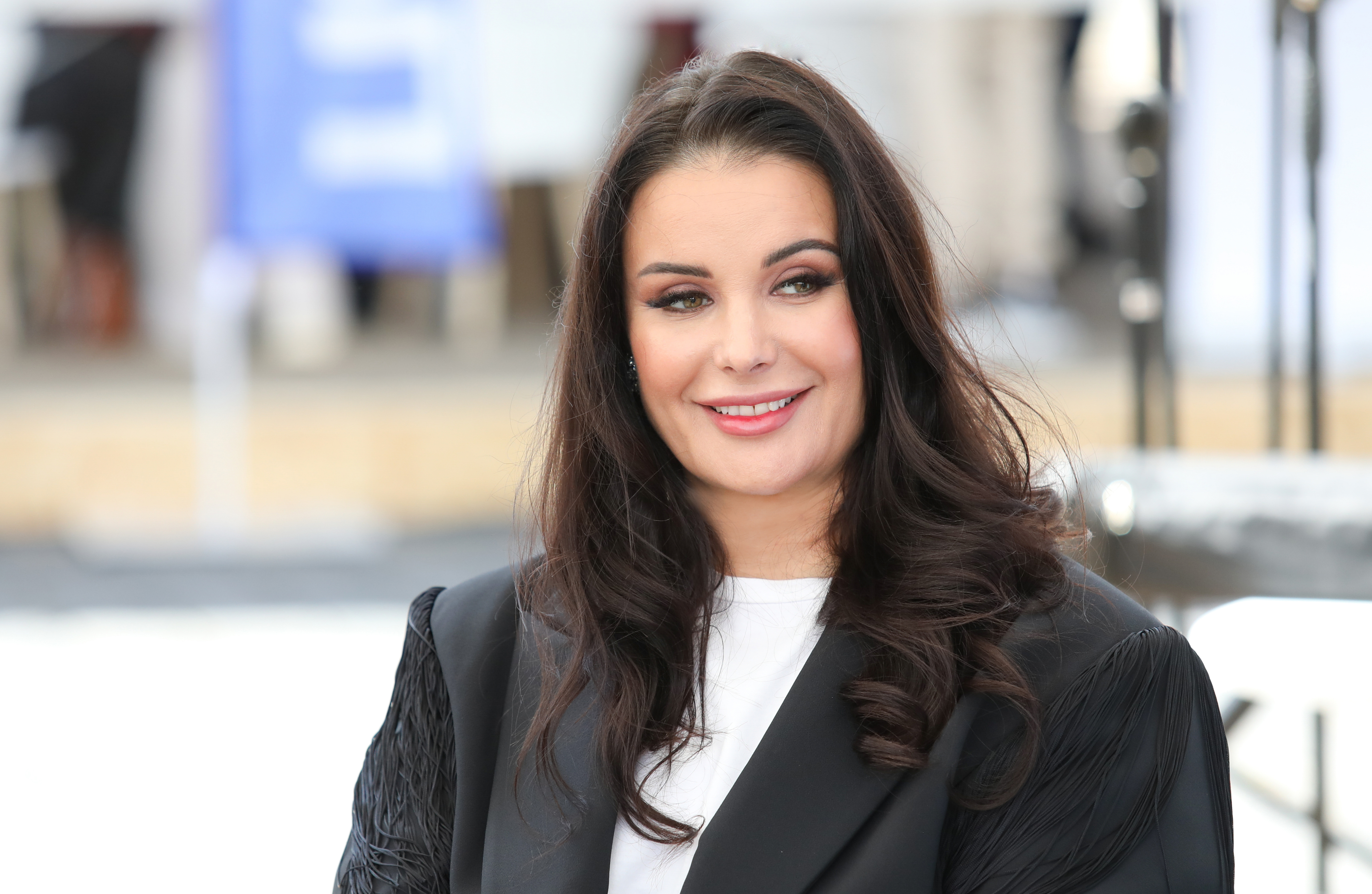
- Fedorova in 2023
- Born: Oksana Gennadyevna Fedorova; 17 December 1977 (age 48); Pskov, Russian SFSR, Soviet Union
- Occupations: Television presenter; model
- Spouses: Philip Toft (m. 2007; div. 2010); Andrey Borodin (m. 2011)
- Children: 2
- Beauty pageant titleholder
- Title: Miss Russia 2001; Miss Universe 2002 (Dethroned)
- Years active: 1999–present
- Hair color: Brown
- Eye color: Green
- Major competitions: Miss Russia 2001 (Winner); Miss Universe 2002 (Winner; Dethroned)
- Oxana Fedorova's voice From the Echo of Moscow program, 14 June 2007

Oksana Gennadyevna Borodina (Russian: Оксана Геннадьевна Бородина, romanized: Oksana Gennad'yevna Borodina; née Fedorova, Russian: Фёдорова, romanized: Fyodorova; born 17 December 1977), known professionally as Oxana Fedorova, is a Russian beauty pageant winner who was crowned Miss Universe 2002, but later was terminated for not fulfilling her duties. In 2024, she was awarded the Honored Artist of the Russian Federation.

Fedorova began her career in the entertainment industry as a model, later becoming Miss Saint Petersburg 1999 and Miss Russia 2001. She went on to win Miss Universe 2002, becoming the first Russian entrant to win Miss Universe. She reigned for 119 days until becoming the first Miss Universe to be terminated, because she was unable to fulfill the duties required of the title, mainly being too busy to travel. Thereafter, she began a career in television, hosting shows such as Good Night, Little Ones! and Fort Boyard: Russia. She has also participated in numerous charity projects, becoming a UNICEF Goodwill Ambassador in 2007. She said in 2016 she became annoyed and frustrated during Donald Trump’s presidential campaign because Western media pestered her for information to apparently defame the billionaire.

== Early life and education ==
Fedorova was born in Pskov to parents Gennadiy Fedorov, a nuclear physicist, and Elena Fedorova (née Trofimovich), a psychiatric nurse. Her parents divorced when she was three years old. As an only child she was brought up by her mother and maternal grandparents. From 1985-1995, she attended lyceum at Pskov and was the captain of the volleyball team and learned to play the guitar while in school. After graduation, she tried to begin a modeling career but various modeling agencies in Saint Petersburg and Moscow were not interested in her.

After working as a police officer in Pskov, she moved to Saint Petersburg to attend the Saint Petersburg State University of the Ministry of Internal Affairs of Russia. While a student, she worked as an investigator for the Pulkovo Transport Police.

Fedorova graduated from university in 2000, and later began post-graduate studies at the same university. She wrote her thesis on "Regulation of Private Detective and Security Activity in the Russian Federation," and also taught civil law to students. In 2002, Fedorova received her Doctor of Philosophy degree in civil law from the Saint Petersburg University of the Ministry of Internal Affairs of Russia in 2003. After receiving her doctorate, she continued to teach at the Saint Petersburg University of the Ministry of Interior of Russia.

== Career ==
=== Police career ===
Fedorova enrolled in the police academy as a teenager, where she played the saxophone in the academy's brass band. After graduating, Fedorova worked as an inspector in Pskov for six months. While a university student in Saint Petersburg, she worked as an investigator for the Pulkovo Transport Police. After finishing her doctorate in 2005, she continued her career as a police officer, being promoted to captain in September 2002 and major in 2005.

=== Modeling and pageantry ===
In 1999, Fedorova began working professionally as a model, and later became introduced to beauty pageants. That year, she was named Miss Saint Petersburg and Miss Kalokagathia. In 2001, she represented Saint Petersburg at Miss Russia, where she was declared the winner.

As a model, Fedorova has worked for designers such as Tony Ward and Yulia Yanina, in addition to participating in fashion weeks in Rome, Milan, and Moscow.

==== Miss Universe 2002 ====
As Miss Russia 2001, Fedorova was unable to attend Miss Universe 2001 due to her studies, but competed the following year at Miss Universe 2002, in San Juan, Puerto Rico. Donald Trump, owner of the Miss Universe Organization said, "This is an unusual year, and these countries are right in the middle of a lot of turmoil. It's tough stuff. Once they're [in San Juan] they feel safe, but it's the getting there that concerns some of them." Fedorova won both the swimsuit and evening gown competitions over the other nine semi-finalists. Upon being crowned Miss Universe 2002, Fedorova was given multiple honors and gifts. Russian designer Helen Yarmak created a doll for her. Fedorova traveled to Canada, France, Greece, Indonesia, Italy, Kenya, Panama, Puerto Rico, and the United States as Miss Universe 2002.

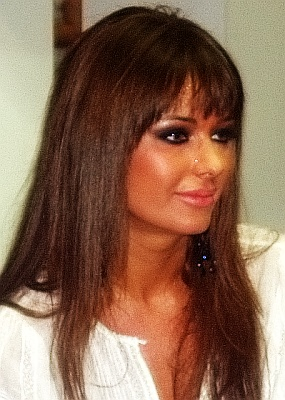
Fedorova in 2008

In Kenya, Fedorova toured HIV/AIDS programs in and around Nairobi, including AIDS orphanages. When she was in Indonesia, she visited Borobudur in Central Java with Miss Indonesia 2002 Melanie Putria Dewita Sari. They also met the President of Indonesia Megawati Sukarnoputri at her residence Istana Negara. In Paris, Fedorova attended the 131st General Assembly of the International Exhibitions Bureau, where she met Nobel Prize winner in physics Zhores Alfyorov. In Italy, Fedorova helped crown Miss Universe Italy 2003 Silvia Ceccon, and while visiting Canada, Fedorova attended the 2002 Toronto International Film Festival. In Panama, Fedorova attended the contract signing that made Panama the host country of the Miss Universe 2003 competition, and in September 2002, Fedorova returned to Puerto Rico to help crown Miss Puerto Rico Universe 2003, Carla Tricoli.

A few months after Fedorova's crowning, she was terminated by the Miss Universe Organization. She later stated in an interview that she had declined to perform her duties because she was so insulted by her treatment on The Howard Stern Show. She blamed the pageant organizers for not warning her of the sexual questions Howard Stern frequently asks. The Mikimoto Crown was passed on to first-runner up Justine Pasek of Panama, who subsequently became her country's first Miss Universe. Fedorova was the first Miss Universe to be terminated.

=== Film and television career ===
Following her dethronement in 2003, Fedorova began pursuing a career in television after she was given an offer to host Star Factory for Channel One but she turned it down and later being selected to host the long-running Russian children's program Good Night, Little Ones! for the VGTRK, beginning in January 2003. The show won the TEFI award for Best Children's Show in October 2003. She went on to cohost the show Subbotnik on Russia-1 from 2004 to 2010. She hosted the Russian national selections for the Junior Eurovision Song Contest 2009 and Eurovision Song Contest 2010, in addition to serving as Russia's spokesperson for the 2008, 2010, and 2012 Eurovision Song Contests. In 2014, she began hosting the style and fashion program Koroleva krasoty.

In 2006, Fedorova competed in the second season of the Russian version of Dancing with the Stars. She came in fifth place. She additionally appeared as a guest judge on the Russian version of Project Runway in 2011, and as a contestant on the Russian version of Name That Tune in 2014. As a voice actress, Fedorova has voiced Russian language versions of Barbie in Toy Story 3 and Queen Clarion in the Tinker Bell film series.

=== Music career ===
Fedorova began her music career in 2009, releasing the single "Prava lyubov" with Nikolay Baskov. The song went on to win Duet of the Year at the 2010 Golden Gramophone Awards. She later released the solo single "Na shag odin" in 2010. Her debut studio album Na krayu u lyubvi was released in 2011. She released the single "Moya doktrina" in 2013. Fedorova and Russian tenor, Dmitry Galikhin released the official video of their Spanish duet "Historia de un Amor" in 2019.

=== Other ventures ===
In 2008, Fedorova released her first book The Formula of Style. The book contained beauty and style advice, in addition to autobiographical information on Fedorova. In 2010, she became the editor-in-chief of MODA TOPICAL Magazine. Fedorova launched her fashion line OFERA in 2014. It made its debut at the Spring/Summer 2015 Mercedes-Benz Fashion Week in Moscow.

Fedorova has partaken in numerous charity projects. She has been a member of UNICEF since 2006, and became a UNICEF Goodwill Ambassador in 2007. Fedorova is additionally a member of the Board of Advisors for the Russian Children's Welfare Society. She created the charity Speshite delat dobro! in October 2009 with the assistance of the Russian Ministry of Defence. The foundation provides support to orphans and children in difficult situations, providing specific attention to orphaned children of parents who died while serving in the Russian Ministry of Internal Affairs or Russian Armed Forces. In 2011, Fedorova founded a school in Ufa for girls ages 10–16.

== Personal life ==
Fedorova is a practicing member of the Russian Orthodox Church. In 2007, Fedorova married German model Philip Toft in Munich. They divorced in 2010. In 2011, Fedorova married Andrey Borodin, a KGB officer, member of the Presidential Administration of Russia, and vice president of the Russian Boxing Federation. Fedorova and Borodin have two children.

Fedorova had previously participated in campaigns for the Russian Party of Life.

== Discography ==
- Na krayu u lyubvi (2011)

== Filmography ==
Year	Title	Role	Notes
2003–present	Good Night, Little Ones!	Herself	Host
2003–2004; 2006	Fort Boyard: Russia	Herself	Host; contestant
2004–2010	Subbotnik	Herself	Cohost
2005	Ty - supermodel (season 2)	Herself	Judge
2006	Ne rodis krasivoy	Herself	1 episode
2006	Yolka		
2006	Tantsy so zvyozdami	Herself	Contestant; 5th place
2006	Sofi	Sofi	French Teacher
2008	Tinker Bell	Queen Clarion	Russian dub
2009	Zolotaya ribka	Herself	
2009	National Final 2009	Herself	
2009	Zolotaya ribka	Herself	
2009	2009 Slavianski Bazaar in Vitebsk	Herself	Cohost
2010	Evrovidenie-2010	Herself	Cohost
2010	Toy Story 3	Barbie	Russian dub
2010	2010 Slavianski Bazaar in Vitebsk	Herself	Cohost
2011	Realnye patsany	Herself	18 episode
2011	Project Runway Russia	Guest judge; 1 episode	
2012	Secret of the Wings	Queen Clarion	Russian dub
2012	Eurovision Song Contest 2012	Herself	Guest Spokesperson and Voting Announcer
2014	The Pirate Fairy	Queen Clarion	Russian dub
2014	Name That Tune Russia	Herself	Contestant; 1 episode
2014–present	Koroleva krasoty	Herself	Host

== Awards and nominations ==
- 2001 — Miss Russia
- 2002 — Miss Universe 2002

Year	Award	Category	Nominated work	Result	Ref.
2010	ZD Award	Duet of the Year	Prava lyubov (with Nikolay Baskov)	Won	
2010	Golden Gramophone Award	Duet of the Year	Prava lyubov (with Nikolay Baskov)	Won	

- 2012 — BIAF for contribution to charity (Lebanon, Beirut)

Awards and achievements
Preceded by (Puerto Rico) Denise Quiñones	Miss Universe; 2002 (Terminated)	Succeeded by (Panama) Justine Pasek (Assumed)
Preceded by Anna Kruglova, Tatarstan	Miss Russia; 2001	Succeeded by Svetlana Koroleva, Karelia
