= Miss Universo Italia 2004 =

- Winner: Laia Manetti

The Miss Universo Italia 2004 pageant was held on March 14, 2004. The chosen winner represented Italy at the Miss Universe 2004 .

== Results ==
- Miss Universo Italia 2004 : Laia Manetti
