= Evelina Papantoniou =

Greek model

Evelina Papantoniou Pateras Εβελίνα Παπαντωνίου Πατέρα
- Born: Evelina Papantoniou; 7 June 1979 (age 47); Athens, Greece
- Height: 5 ft 11 in (1.80 m)
- Beauty pageant titleholder
- Title: Star Hellas 2001 (Miss Greece 2001)
- Hair color: Brown
- Eye color: Brown
- Major competitions: Star Hellas 2001 (Winner); Miss Universe 2001 (1st Runner-Up)

Evelina Papantoniou Pateras (Greek: Εβελίνα Παπαντωνίου Πατέρα; born 7 June 1979) is a Greek actress, model and beauty pageant titleholder who was crowned Star Hellas 2001 and represented Greece at Miss Universe 2001 pageant where she placed 1st Runner-Up. She continued her career as a jewelry designer and founder of the brand “ANILEVE” and is currently pursuing a career in the maritime business.

== Miss Universe 2001 ==
Papantoniou won Star Hellas 2001 gaining the right to represent Greece at the Miss Universe 2001 pageant in Bayamón, Puerto Rico, where she finished as 1st Runner-Up to Denise Quiñones of Puerto Rico.

== Personal ==
She started modeling at the age of 15 and worked as a bartender and waitress. She was part of an elite volunteer team that supported and counseled victims after the earthquake which hit Athens in 1999. She has a diploma in Arts and Interior Design and enjoys sculpting, painting and photography. Aside from modeling, she has also had some parts in various films. In the past, she was pursuing a modeling career, represented by Ace Models Agency and appearing on the covers of numerous fashion magazines, such as Close Up, Vogue, and Madame Figaro

In her personal life she has been a couple since 2009 with shipowner Nikolaos D. Pateras and they have a son.

Awards and achievements
Preceded by (Venezuela) Claudia Moreno	Miss Universe 1st Runner-Up; 2001	Succeeded by (Panama) Justine Pasek
Preceded by Nancy Tzoulaki	Star Hellas; 2001	Succeeded by Lena Paparigopoulou
