= Naked Heart Foundation =

Russian children's charity organization

- Founded: 2004
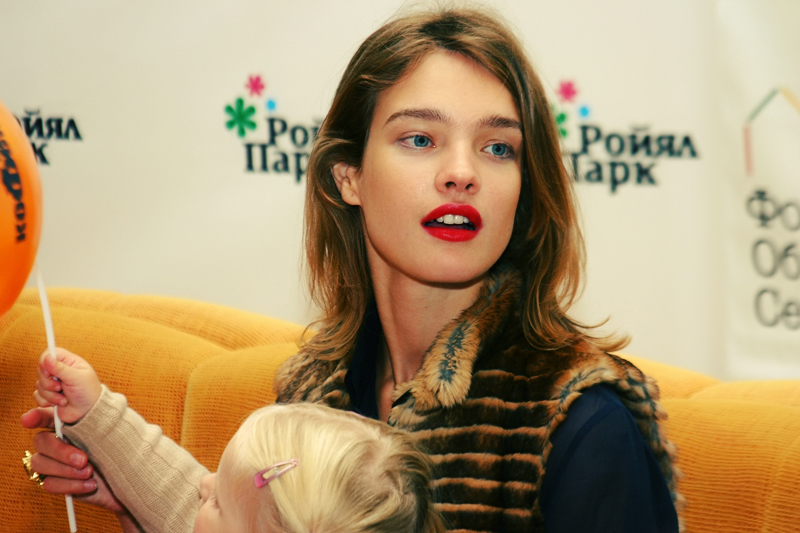
- Founder: Natalia Vodianova
- Type: Non-governmental organization
- Purpose: Providing play facilities across Russia for underprivileged children and supporting children with special needs and their families.
- Location: Russia
- Region served: Russia
- Method: Constructing play parks; Raising awareness about special needs and disability among children; Preventing the institutionalization of underprivileged and disabled children.
- Key people: Natalia Vodianova – Founder
- Website: nakedHeart.org

Naked Heart Foundation is an NGO for disabled children based in Russia. The foundation provides educational programs, free support services, play facilities in impoverished areas, and support for foster families and families raising disabled children, along with funding NGOs that work with such families.

== History ==
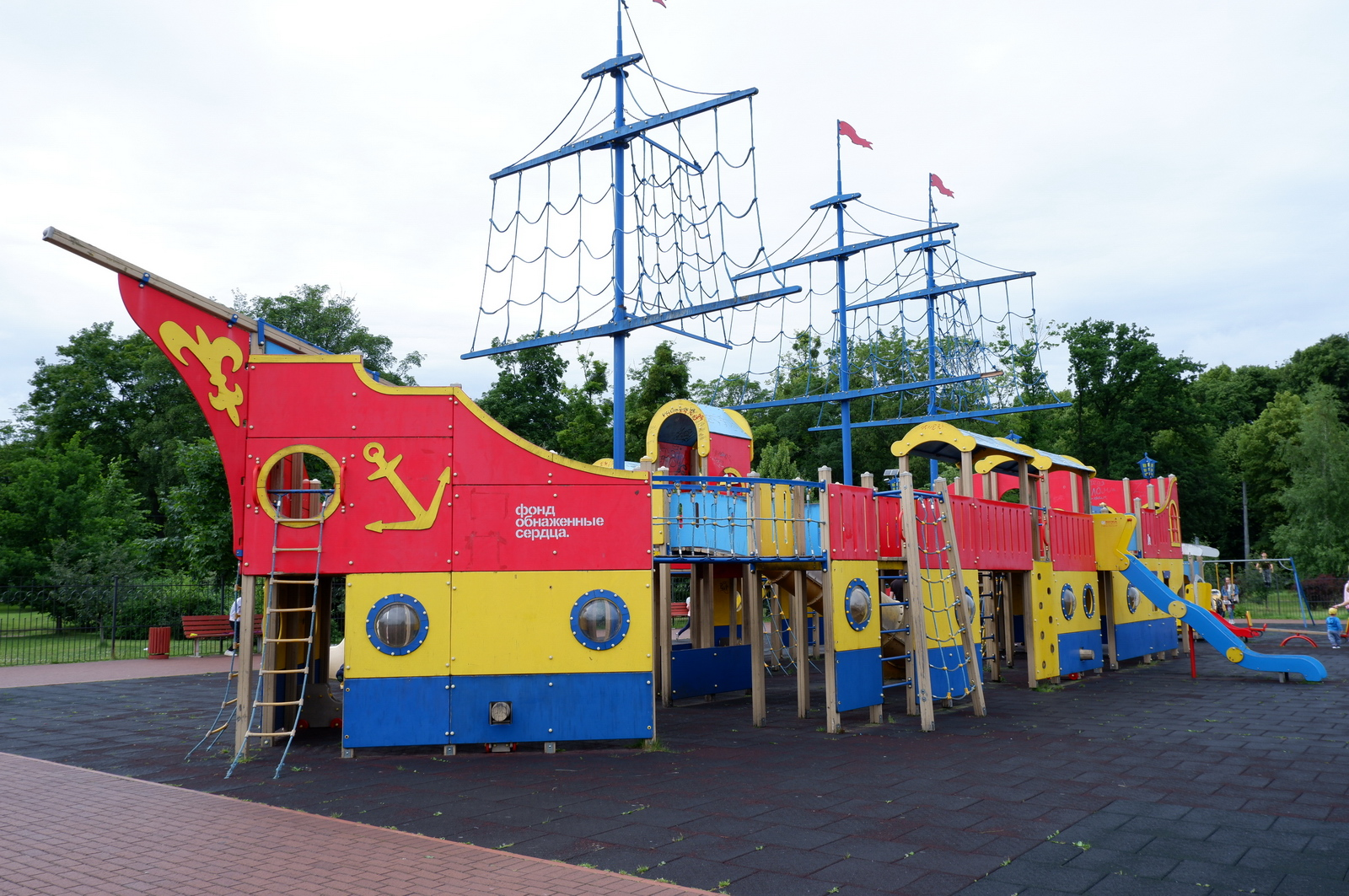
Playground in Kaliningrad

The organization was founded in 2004 by Russian model and actress Natalia Vodianova in response to 2004 Beslan School siege and, more generally, her perception of the importance of play for children. The organization built its first play parks in 2006 in Nizhny Novgorod as part of its "Play with Purpose" program. It has since built over 158 play parks and playgrounds (the distinction being that the latter are smaller in size). Architect and artist Adam Kalkin designed the parks' recreation centers, which are constructed out of shipping containers.

In 2011, the Naked Heart Foundation launched "Every Child Deserves a Family" programme with a goal to support families raising children with special needs. The foundation gives financial and administrative aid to social workers who work for NGOs and assist families of children with special developmental needs. In 2011, the charity opened its first Family Support Centre in Nizhny Novgorod, where families raising children with special needs are provided free support from teachers, psychologists and therapists.

There have been several events to raise funds for the Foundation – most notably the Love Ball. The event has been held biannually and served as the main source of funding for the charity's programmes. The 2008 Love Ball in Moscow (12–14 February 2008) was organized as a three-day event. The event raised $5 million for the Naked Heart Foundation's programs. The 2010 Love Ball, held in London, was supported by De Beers that participated in a charity auction conducted by Christie's. The event raised £1.2 million for the Naked Heart Foundation, which enabled the construction of 14 new play parks and playgrounds around Russia.

The 2011 Love Ball was a summer event held on the grounds of Valentino Garavani's 17th century Château de Wideville near Paris. The theme of the event was "White Fairy Tale", with most guests dressing in white or silver in keeping with the fairytale theme. The event raised €2.3 million. Guests included Christian Louboutin, Margherita Missoni, Olivia Palermo, Eva Herzigova, Paolo Roversi, Tommy Hilfiger, Daphne Guinness, Marc Newson, "Arki" Arpad Busson, Riccardo Tisci, Matthew Freud, and Valentino Garavani. Anne Hathaway was the hostess for the evening. Fashion designers created a unique collection of dresses that were sold as lots during the charity auction. Designers included: Agent Provocateur, Alena Akhmadullina, Alexander McQueen, Alexander Wang, Balmain, Burberry, Calvin Klein, Chanel, Christopher Kane, Christian Dior, Denis Simachev, Diane von Furstenberg, Dolce and Gabbana, Franck Sorbier, Gareth Pugh, Giambattista Valli, Giles Deacon, Giorgio Armani, Givenchy, Gucci, Hussein Chalayan, Julien Macdonald, Lanvin, Louis Vuitton, Marchesa, Nina Ricci, Olivier Theyskens, Oscar de la Renta, Prada, Riccardo Tisci, Roberto Cavalli, Stella McCartney, Tsumori Chisato, Ulyana Sergeenko, Valentin Yudashkin, Valentino, Vera Wang, Versace, Vika Gazinskaya, Viktor and Rolf, Vivienne Westwood, Worth, Yves Saint Laurent, and Yulia Yanina.

The 2013 Love Ball RIVIERA took place on 27 July 2013 in Monaco, held in Salle Garnier of the Opéra de Monte-Carlo that was transformed specially for the event in a dining room. It took place with the high patronage of Albert II, Prince of Monaco, and Charlene, Princess of Monaco. The Naked Heart Foundation raised 3.2 mln euro during the charity auction. The 2019 Love Ball Arabia held under the patronage of Her Excellency Sheikha Al Mayassa bint Hamad bin Khalifa Al Thani and Natalia Vodianova in Doha as part of the Qatar–Russia cultural exchange. The charity gala raised 7.4 million USD for both Naked Heart Foundation and Al Shafallah.

== Structure ==
The organization has an office in London. The Foundation's accounts are available under its entry on the Charity Commission's website.
