= Opéra de Monte-Carlo =

Opera house in Monaco

Coordinates: 43°44′20″N 07°25′42″E

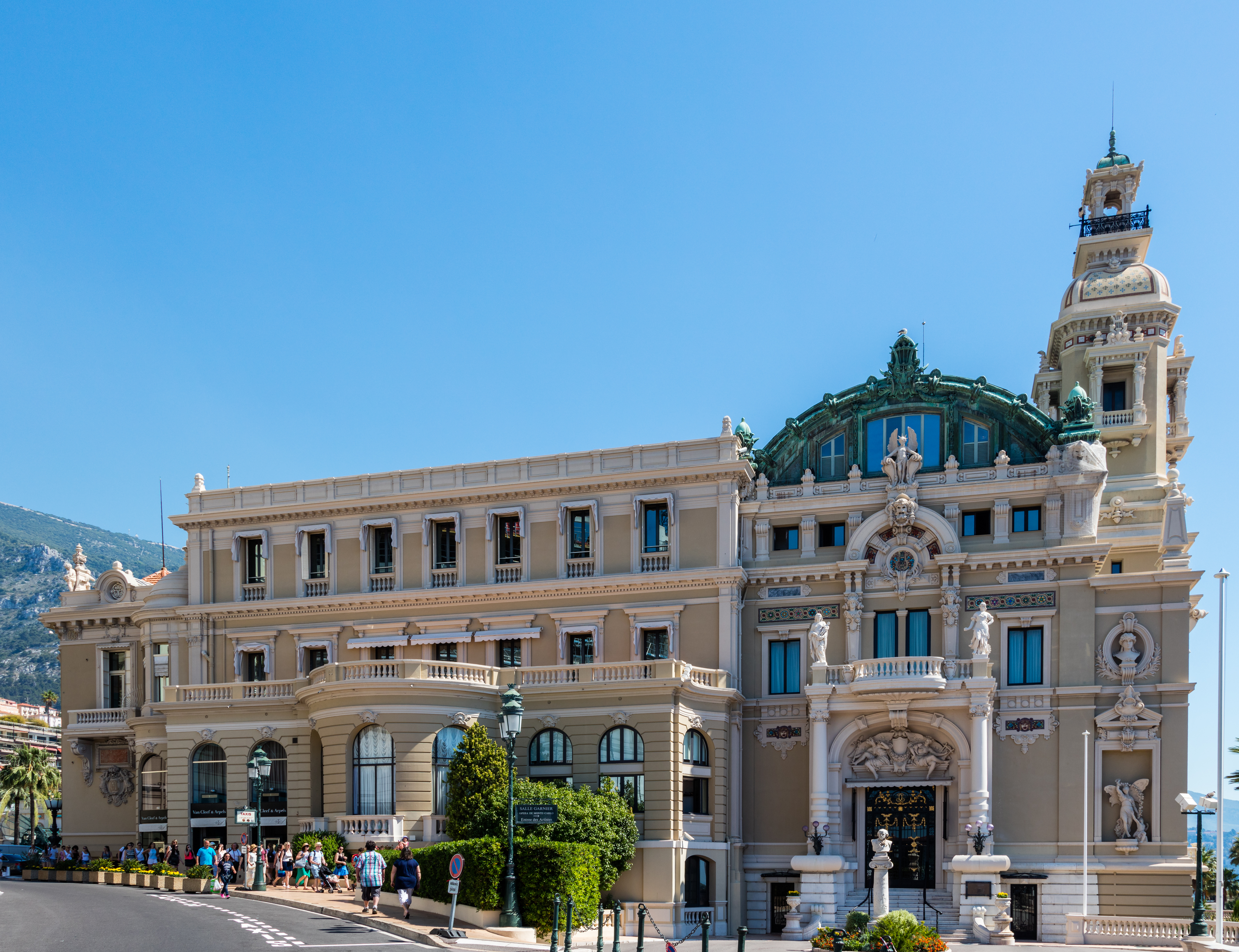
Entrance to the Salle Garnier

The Opéra de Monte-Carlo (French pronunciation: [ɔpeʁa d(ə) mɔ̃te kaʁlo]) is an opera house which is part of the Monte Carlo Casino located in the Principality of Monaco.

With the lack of cultural diversions available in Monaco in the 1870s, Prince Charles III, along with the Société des Bains de Mer, decided to include a concert hall as part of the casino. The main public entrance to the hall was from the casino, while Charles III's private entrance was on the western side. It opened in 1879 and became known as the Salle Garnier, after the architect Charles Garnier, who designed it.

During the renovation of the Salle Garnier in 2004–05, the company presented operas at the Salle des Princes in the local Grimaldi Forum, a modern conference and performance facility where Les Ballets de Monte-Carlo and the Monte-Carlo Philharmonic Orchestra regularly perform.

== Salle Garnier ==
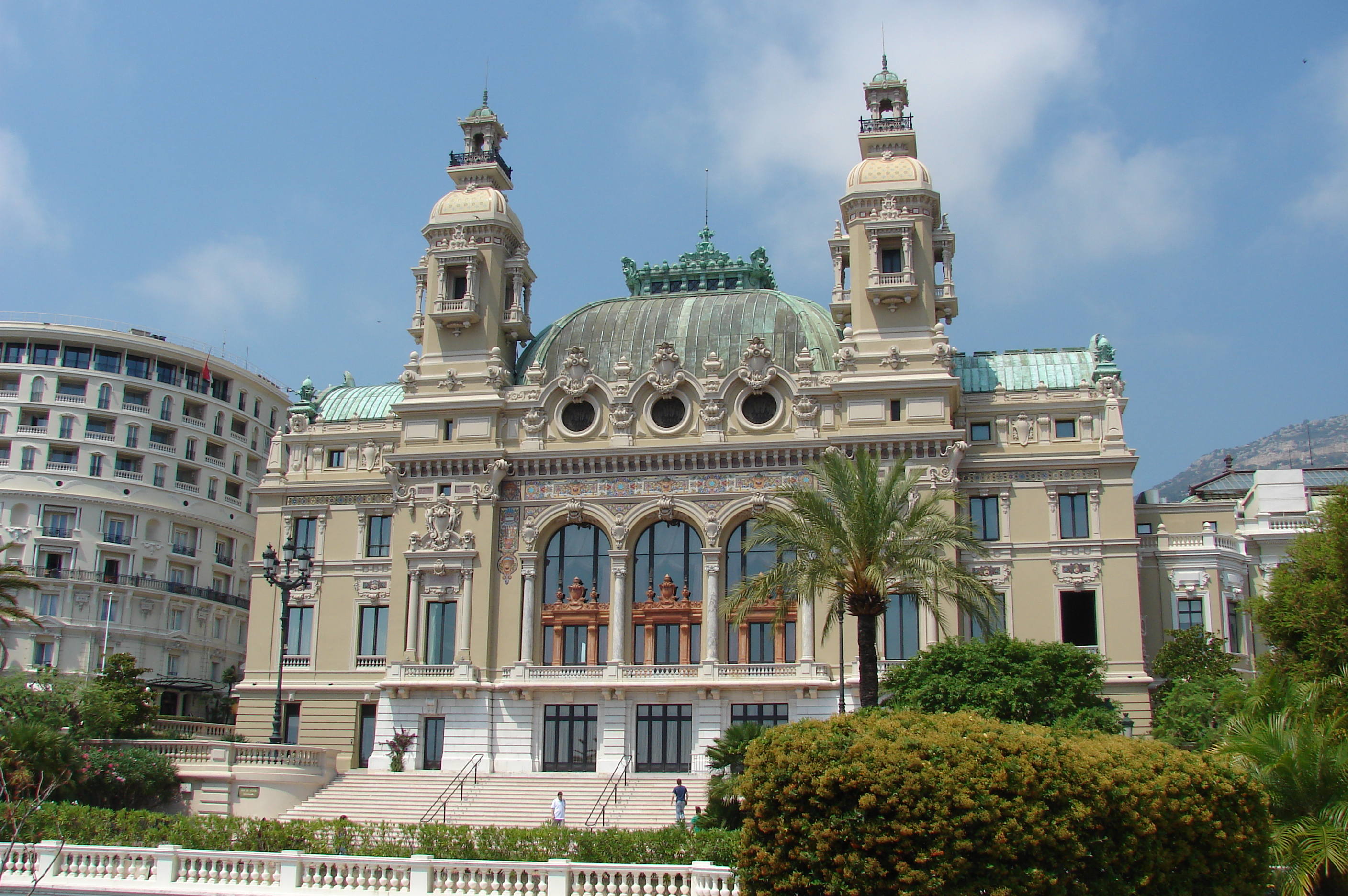
Seaside façade of the Salle Garnier, home of the Opéra de Monte-Carlo

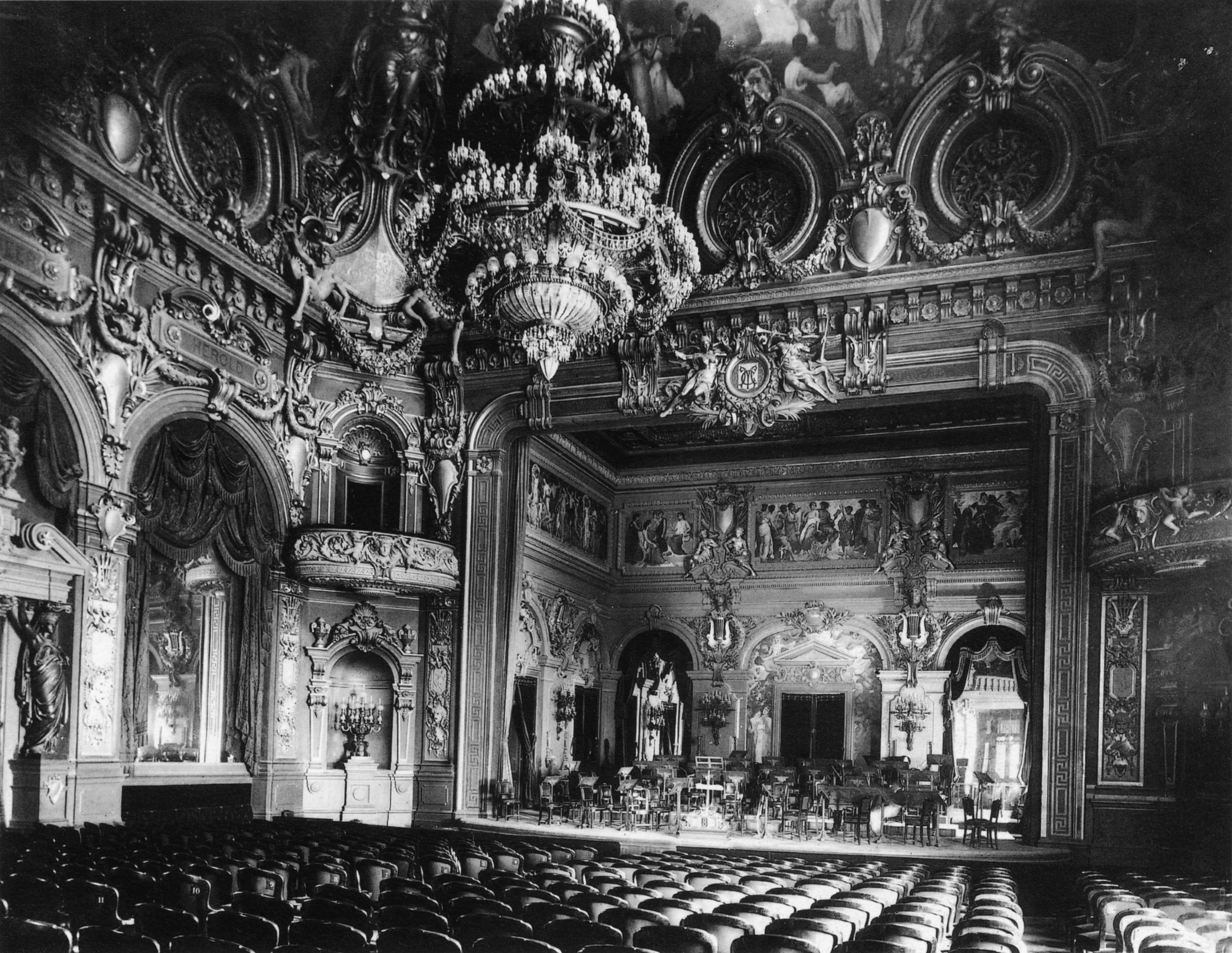
Auditorium and stage (c. 1879)

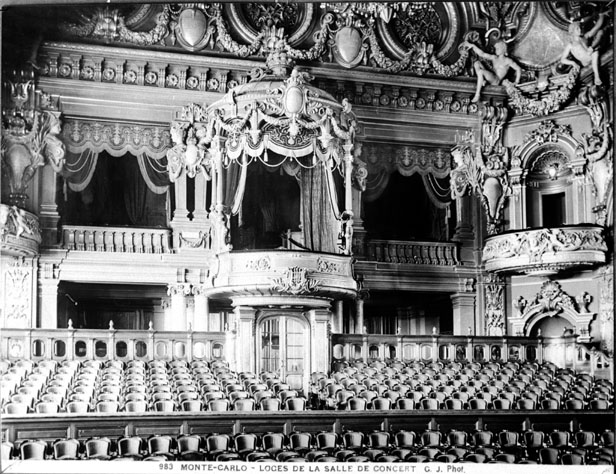
Royal box (c. 1900)

The architect Charles Garnier also designed the Paris opera house now known as the Palais Garnier. The Salle Garnier is much smaller, seating 524, compared to about 2,000 for the Palais Garnier, and unlike the Paris theatre, which was started in 1861 and only completed in 1875, the Salle Garnier was constructed in only eight and a half months. Nevertheless, its ornate style was heavily influenced by that of the Palais Garnier, and many of the same artists worked on both theatres, including Gustave Boulanger. Although the Monte Carlo theatre was not originally intended for opera, it was soon used frequently for that purpose and was remodeled in 1898–99 by Henri Schmit, primarily in the stage area, to make it more suitable for opera.

The hall was inaugurated on 25 January 1879 with a performance by Sarah Bernhardt dressed as a nymph. The first opera performed there was Robert Planquette's Le Chevalier Gaston on 8 February 1879, followed by three additional operas in the first season.

With the influence of the first director, Jules Cohen (who was instrumental in bringing Adelina Patti) and the fortunate combination of Raoul Gunsbourg, the new director from 1892, and Princess Alice, the opera-loving American wife of Charles III's successor, Albert I, the company was thrust onto the world's opera community stage. Gunsbourg remained for sixty years, overseeing such premiere productions as Hector Berlioz's La damnation de Faust in 1893 with Jean de Reszke and Rose Caron as Faust and Marguerite, and the first appearances in January 1894 of the heroic Italian tenor Francesco Tamagno in Verdi's Otello, whose title role he had created for the opera's premiere in Italy 7 years prior. In 1909, the Monte-Carlo Opera presented the French version of Richard Wagner's Ring of the Nibelung in its entirety. Conductor Arturo Vigna served as music director of the Monte Carlo Opera from 1895 to 1903.

By the early years of the twentieth century, the Salle Garnier was to see such great performers as Nellie Melba and Enrico Caruso in La bohème and Rigoletto (in 1902), and Feodor Chaliapin in the premiere of Jules Massenet's Don Quichotte (1910). This production formed part of a long association between the company and Massenet and his operas, two of which were presented there posthumously.

Other famous twentieth-century singers to appear at Monte Carlo included Titta Ruffo, Geraldine Farrar, Mary Garden, Tito Schipa, Beniamino Gigli, Claudia Muzio, Georges Thill, Lily Pons, and Mary McCormic.

Apart from Massenet, composers whose works had their first performances at Monte Carlo included Saint-Saëns (Hélène, 1904), Mascagni (Amica, 1905), and Puccini (La rondine, 1917). Indeed, since its inauguration, the theatre has hosted 45 world premiere productions of operas. René Blum was retained to found the Ballets Russes de Monte-Carlo. The "Golden Age" of the Salle Garnier has passed, since small companies with small houses are not able to mount highly expensive productions. Nonetheless, the present day company still presents a season containing five or six operas.

== Gala events in the Salle Garnier ==
Three times in its 130-year history the Opéra was transformed into a spectacular venue to host gala-dinners. The first occasion was in 1966 for the celebration of centenary of Monte-Carlo hosted by Grace Kelly and Rainier III; the second was for the royal wedding of Prince Albert II and Princess Charlene. The Opéra was transformed for the third time on 27 July 2013 to host the Love Ball, a fundraising gala event organised by the Naked Heart Foundation.

== See also ==
- Category:Opera world premieres at the Opéra de Monte-Carlo
- Mondial du Théâtre
