= Denise Quiñones =

Puerto Rican actress, Miss Universe (born 1980)

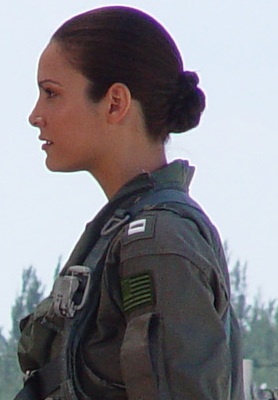
- Denise Quiñones as Lt. Rachel Torres in Aquaman.
- Born: Denise Marie Quiñones August; September 9, 1980 (age 46); Ponce, Puerto Rico
- Occupations: Actress, singer
- Beauty pageant titleholder
- Title: Miss Lares Universe 2001; Miss Puerto Rico Universe 2001; Miss Universe 2001
- Hair color: Brown
- Eye color: Brown
- Major competitions: Miss Puerto Rico Universe 2001 (Winner); Miss Universe 2001 (Winner) (Miss Photogenic) (Bluepoint Best in Swimsuit) (Clairol Herbal Essences Style Award)
- Website: https://twitter.com/DeniseQuinones9

Denise Marie Quiñones August (born 9 September 1980) is a Puerto Rican actress, model and beauty queen who was crowned Miss Universe 2001. Prior to winning the Miss Universe pageant, she represented her hometown of Lares in the Miss Puerto Rico Universe 2001 pageant.

== Career ==
Quiñones won the Miss Universe 2001 pageant in Bayamon, Puerto Rico in 2001. She was crowned by Lara Dutta, Miss Universe 2000 of India and also won the awards of Miss Photogenic, Bluepoint Swimsuit, and Clairol Best Style. She is only the fourth Miss Universe winner to also win Miss Photogenic after Margareta Arvidsson, Margarita Moran, and Janelle Commissiong. Her win came on the Miss Universe pageant's 50th anniversary. As Miss Universe, Quiñones resided in New York City for a year, enjoying the benefits that all winners of the pageant receive, including complimentary make-up and haircare, a car, complete wardrobe, professional representation by the Miss Universe Organization, a $60,000 scholarship to a New York City film school, and traveling opportunities. Quiñones was the first winner to wear the reputed Mikimoto Crown during its official press presentation by Mikimoto's former brand director, Mr. Toyohiko Miyamoto.

On the night of the Miss Universe 2002 contest, she passed on her crown, once again in Puerto Rico (this time the event was held in the city of San Juan), to Oxana Fedorova of Russia.

After relinquishing the title, Quiñones attended the School for Film and Television's two-year conservatory acting program. Presently an actress, Quiñones has starred in the Spanish version of Nilo Cruz's play Ana en el trópico (Anna in the Tropics) and continues to hone her talent in the United States. For her role in Anna in the Tropics, she was nominated and awarded an HOLA Award (from the Hispanic Organization of Latin Actors) and an ACE Award. In October 2005, she was selected for the role of Doña Rosita, in a production of Federico García Lorca's play Doña Rosita la soltera.

Quiñones guest-starred in a season 5 episode of the WB Network television series Smallville. She played Andrea, a masked avenger who fought crime in Metropolis and invited Clark Kent (Tom Welling) to join her in her adventures. On the heels of her Smallville role, she was also cast in the role of "Rachel", a young fighter pilot in the pilot for the TV series Aquaman, which was in development for the CW Television Network. The pilot did not make the fall 2006 lineup.

In November 2006, Quiñones led the off-Broadway cast of Zanahorias (or Carrots in English), a Spanish comedy by Spanish playwright Antonio Zancada. For her role in Zanahorias, she won an ACE Award in 2007.

In July 2008, it was announced that Quiñones would play the part of Lara in the upcoming film I Hope They Serve Beer In Hell, based on the book of the same name. On July 24, 2008, producer Tucker Max announced on the film's official production blog that Quiñones had dropped out due to a scheduling conflict.

In February 2014, Quiñones joined the eighth season of Univision's beauty pageant reality show Nuestra Belleza Latina 2014 as a team mentor where she coaches a team of young women on modeling industry success techniques.

On February 15, 2018, Quiñones was named as the new pageant director for Miss Universe Puerto Rico, taking over responsibilities previously held by former director Desiree Lowry. As national director, Quiñones assisted in preparing the island's delegates for the Miss Universe pageant. Her most successful delegate was Madison Anderson who finished as 1st Runner-Up in 2019. Other successful delegates under her directorship were Kiara Ortega who finished in the Top 5 in 2018 and Estefanía Soto who finished in the Top 10 in 2020, respectively. In 2021, Quiñones stepped down as national director and Yizette Cifredo was designated as her successor.

== Personal life ==
Quiñones was born in Ponce, Puerto Rico. She dated rapper René Pérez, from the band Calle 13, from 2006 to 2009. From 2010 to 2011, Quiñones was in a relationship with Dominican actor Frank Perozo.

== Filmography ==
=== Films ===
- Elite (2010) - Special agent Sandra Torres
- La Soga aka The Butcher’s Wife (2009) - Jenny
- Party Time
- Bad Boys II (2003) (uncredited) - Street walker in Cuba

=== Television ===
- Elena Santos - Yarelis (serie de TV de PR)
- Aquaman (2006) TV series - Rachel
- Smallville - "Vengeance Chronicles” (2006) Webisode - Andrea Rojas (Angel of Vengeance)
- Smallville - "Vengeance" (2006) TV episode - Andrea Rojas (Angel of Vengeance)
- The Bedford Diaries (2006) TV series - Mia Thorne (post-production)
- Freddie - "The Two That Got Away" (2006) TV episode - Denise
- Freddie - "The Mixer" (2006) TV episode - Denise
- Love Monkey - Pilot (2006) TV episode - Gorgeous Woman

== Theater ==
- Pantaleón y las visitadoras
- Ana en el Tropico
- Doña Rosita la Soltera
- Doña Flor Y Sus Dos Maridos
- Zanahorias (Primera edicion)

== See also ==
- List of Puerto Ricans
- History of women in Puerto Rico

Awards and achievements
Preceded by (India) Lara Dutta	Miss Universe; 2001	Succeeded by (Russia) Oxana Fedorova (Terminated) (Panama) Justine Pasek (Assumed)
Preceded by (Spain) Helen Lindes	Miss Photogenic Universe; 2001	Succeeded by (Puerto Rico) Isis Casalduc
Preceded by Zoraida Fonalledas (Guaynabo)	Miss Puerto Rico Universe; 2001	Succeeded by Isis Casalduc (Utuado)
