= Miss Universe 2004 =

53rd edition of the Miss Universe competition

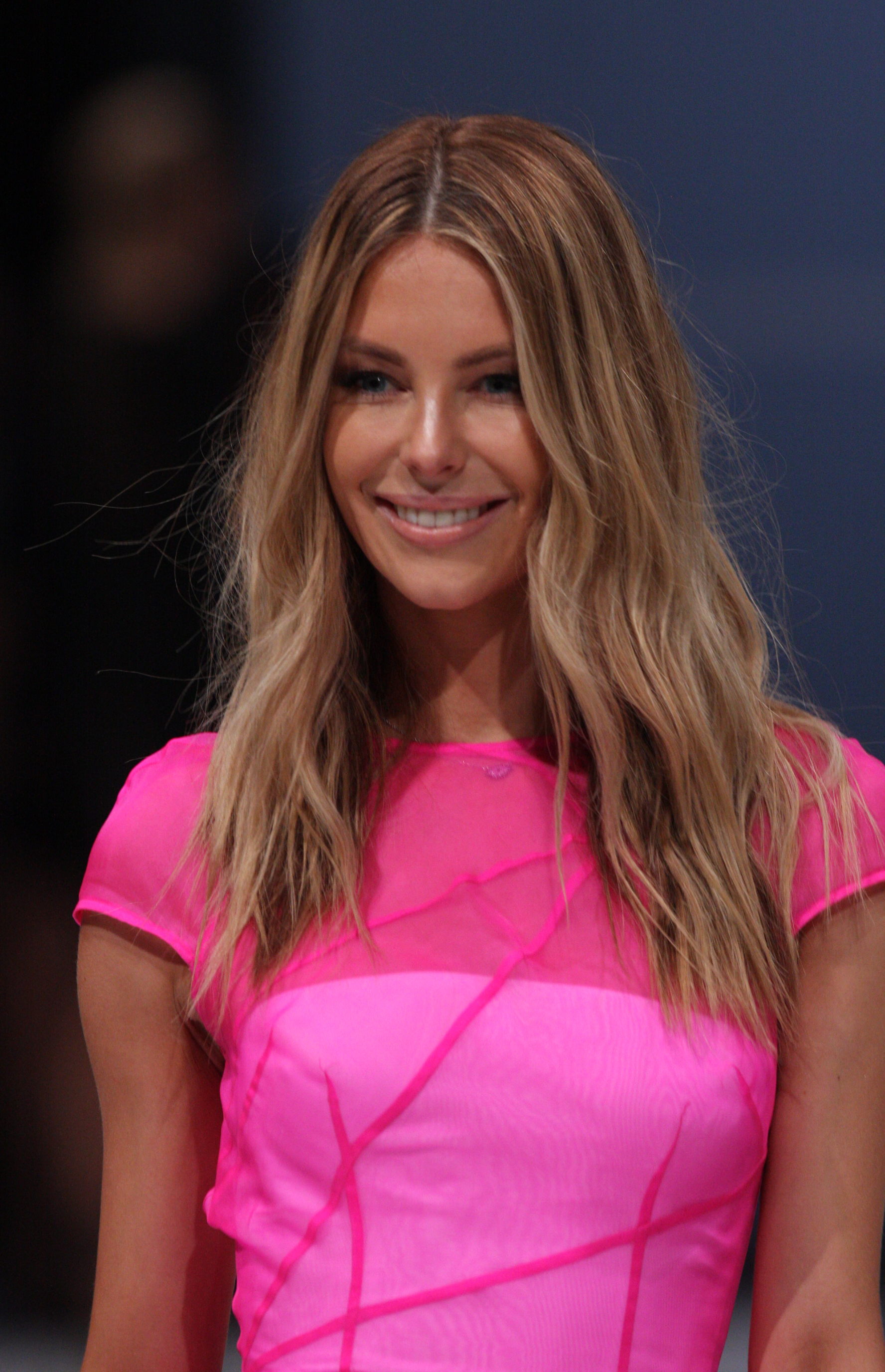
- Jennifer Hawkins
- Date: 1 June 2004
- Presenters: Billy Bush; Daisy Fuentes
- Entertainment: Gloria Estefan
- Venue: Centro de Convenciones CEMEXPO, Quito, Ecuador
- Broadcaster: International: NBC; Telemundo; Official: Gamavisión; Asociación Ecuatoriana de Canales de Televisión
- Entrants: 80
- Placements: 15
- Debuts: Ethiopia; Georgia; Vietnam
- Withdrawals: Albania; Argentina; Mauritius; Namibia; New Zealand
- Returns: Austria; Botswana; Chile; Denmark; Ghana; Kenya; Lebanon; Paraguay; Saint Vincent and the Grenadines; Turks and Caicos Islands; Uruguay
- Winner: Jennifer Hawkins; Australia
- Congeniality: Laia Manetti; Italy
- Best National Costume: Jessica Rodríguez; Panama
- Photogenic: Alba Reyes; Puerto Rico

Miss Universe 2004 was the 53rd Miss Universe pageant, held at the Centro de Convenciones CEMEXPO in Quito, Ecuador, on 1 June 2004.

At the conclusion of the event, Amelia Vega of the Dominican Republic crowned Jennifer Hawkins of Australia as Miss Universe 2004. It is Australia's first victory in thirty-two years, and the second victory in the pageant's history.

Contestants from eighty countries competed in this year's pageant. The competition was hosted by Billy Bush and Daisy Fuentes. Cuban-American singer and songwriter Gloria Estefan performed in this year's pageant.

== Background ==
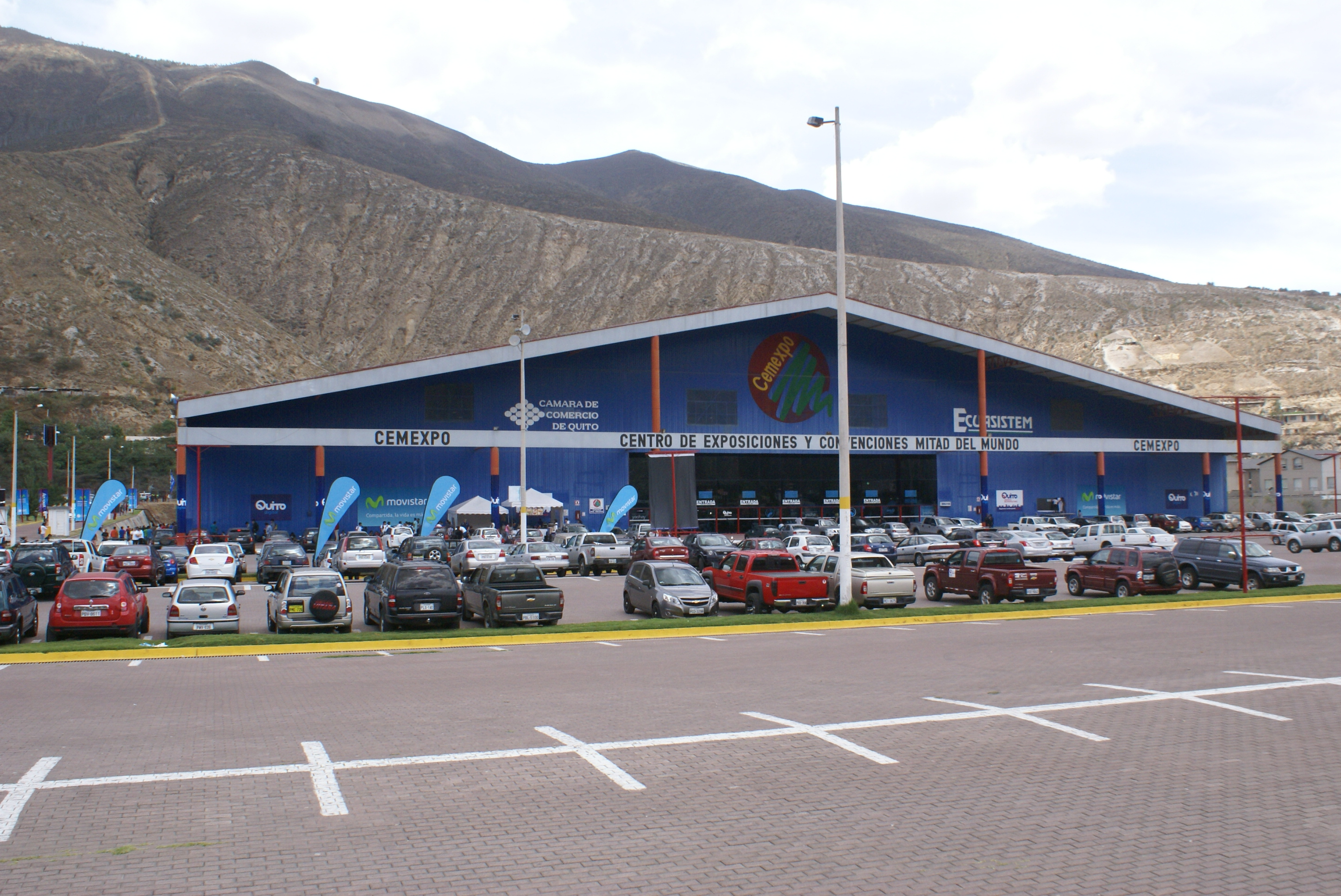
CEMEXPO, venue for Miss Universe 2004

=== Location and date ===
In September 2002, the Miss Bahamas Universe Organization announced that the Bahamas is tentatively set to host the pageant. However, plans to host the pageant did not materialize, and the Bahamas hosted the pageant in 2009.

Quito, Ecuador was announced as host city of the pageant on 19 August 2003. The city paid $5 million for the right to host the event, although it anticipated recouping this through visitors and promotion of the country during the televised competition.

In March, Ecuador's foreign trade minister was forced to reject rumours that the pageant was at risk of being moved to China, and he urged Ecuadorians to back the pageant. As an added incentive for tourists, American Airlines, official airline sponsor of the pageant, offered 5% off airfares to Quito for travel to the pageant, as well as 10% off for those who booked a month in advance. The attempted use of the pageant to promote Ecuador threatened to be derailed just prior to the telecast, when a corruption scandal led to growing demands for the removal of President Lucio Gutiérrez in the politically unstable country.

Prior to the arrival of delegates in early May, officials in Quito attempted to renovate areas where they would be visiting, which involved temporarily removing beggars and homeless people from certain areas of the city. The event was protested by native Indian activists and environmentalists who accused the government of concealing the nations poverty whilst the pageant was being hosted.

The delegates, judges, media and tourists were heavily protected by a security detail involving over 5000 police officers. On 16 May, just hours before delegates were expected to participate in a parade in Cuenca, a pamphlet bomb was deactivated by police. Although it was protesting the economic policies of the Ecuadorian government, police suspected that the bomb, found just six blocks from the parade route, was timed specifically to coincide with the event.

=== Selection of participants ===
Contestants from eighty countries and territories were selected to compete in the pageant. Two delegates were appointees to their position to replace the original dethroned winner.

Zita Galgociová was initially chosen to represent Slovakia, but she was replaced with her first runner-up Zuzana Dvorská because she was under the minimum age. Miss Hanoi-Vietnam 2003 Hồng Vân Nguyễn was chosen to represent Vietnam, but she was replaced by the gold medal winner of Vietnam Supermodel Award 2004 Khánh Ngọc Hoàng with unknown reasons.

The 2004 edition saw the debuts of Ethiopia, Georgia, and Vietnam, and the returns of Austria, Botswana, Chile, Denmark, Ghana, Kenya, Lebanon, Paraguay, Saint Vincent and the Grenadines, Turks and Caicos Islands, and Uruguay. Saint Vincent and the Grenadines last competed in 1991, Austria in 1999, Denmark in 2000, Botswana, Turks and Caicos Islands, Lebanon, and Paraguay in 2001, while the others last competed in 2002. Albania, Argentina, Mauritius, Namibia, and New Zealand withdrew. Sabine Bourdet of Mauritius withdrew due to health problems, while Petrina Thomas of Namibia withdrew due to lack of sponsorship. Albania, Argentina, and New Zealand withdrew after their respective organizations failed to hold a national competition or appoint a delegate.

Maria José Girol Jimenez was set to compete at Miss Universe. However, Jimenez withdrew due to the lack of sponsorship. Dian Krishna, Puteri Indonesia 2003, was welcomed by the pageant organizers and was given the chance to attend the show in the audience as an observer. Ragnhildur Jónsdóttir of Iceland was also set to compete at Miss Universe, but withdrew due to undisclosed reasons.

== Results ==
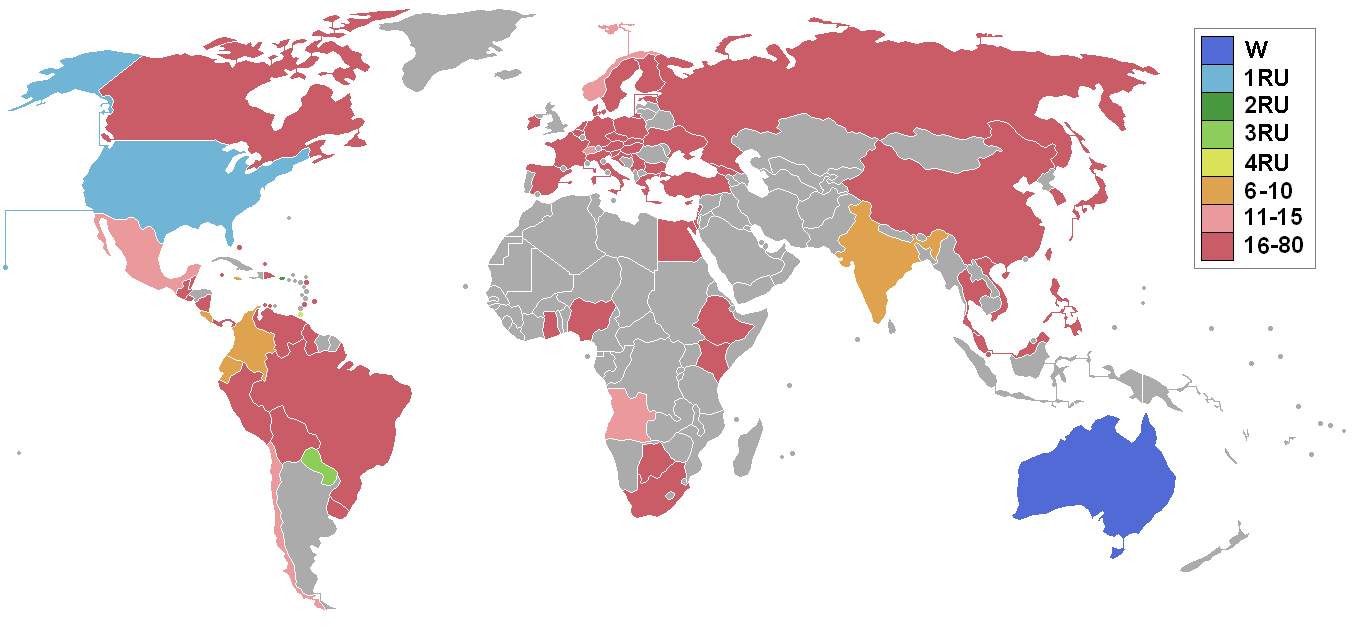
Miss Universe 2004 participating countries and territories

=== Placements ===
Placement	Contestant
Miss Universe 2004	Australia – Jennifer Hawkins
1st Runner-Up	United States – Shandi Finnessey
2nd Runner-Up	Puerto Rico – Alba Reyes
3rd Runner-Up	Paraguay – Yanina González
4th Runner-Up	Trinidad and Tobago – Danielle Jones
Top 10	Colombia – Catherine Daza; Costa Rica – Nancy Soto; Ecuador – Susana Rivadeneira; India – Tanushree Dutta; Jamaica – Christine Straw
Top 15	Angola – Telma Sonhi; Chile – Gabriela Barros; Mexico – Rosalva Luna; Norway – Kathrine Sørland; Switzerland – Bianca Sissing

=== Special awards ===
Award	Contestant
Miss Photogenic	Puerto Rico – Alba Reyes
Miss Congeniality	Italy – Laia Manetti
Best National Costume	Panama – Jessica Rodríguez
Best Catwalk	Vietnam – Khánh Ngọc Hoàng

== Pageant ==
=== Format ===
Same with 2003, fifteen semifinalists were chosen through the preliminary competition— composed of the swimsuit and evening gown competitions and closed-door interviews. The fifteen semifinalists competed in the evening gown and were narrowed down to ten afterward. The ten semifinalists competed in the swimsuit competition and were narrowed down to five afterward. The five finalists competed in the question and answer round and the final look.

=== Selection committee ===
==== Final telecast ====
- Bo Derek – Film actress
- Bill Rancic – Winner of the first season of The Apprentice
- Katie Pritz – Today Show's "You Be The Judge" contest winner
- Wendy Fitzwilliam – Miss Universe 1998 from Trinidad and Tobago
- Elsa Benítez – International supermodel
- Jon Tutolo – President of Trump Model Management
- Anne Martin – Vice President of Global Cosmetics and Marketing of Procter & Gamble Cosmetics
- Monique Menniken – Supermodel
- Petra Němcová – Sports Illustrated supermodel
- Jefferson Pérez – 1996 Ecuadorian Olympic gold medalist
- Emilio Estefan – Music producer and entertainer

Note: Kwame Jackson, runner-up on the first season of The Apprentice, was initially chosen as a judge, but he was disqualified because he inadvertently visited the hotel where the delegates were staying and interacted with some of the contestants.

== Contestants ==
Eighty contestants competed for the title.

Country/Territory	Contestant	Age (Note: Ages at the time of the pageant)	Hometown
Angola	Telma Sonhi	18	Lunda Sul
Antigua and Barbuda	Ann-Marie Brown	25	St. John's
Aruba	Zizi Lee	22	Oranjestad
Australia	Jennifer Hawkins	20	Newcastle
Austria	Daniela Strigl	23	Salzburg
(The Bahamas) Bahamas	Raquel Horton	24	New Providence
Barbados	Cindy Batson	19	Saint Michael
Belgium	Lindsy Dehollander	21	Brussels
Belize	Leilah Pandy	23	Belize City
Bolivia	Gabriela Oviedo	21	Santa Cruz
Botswana	Icho Keolotswe	24	Gaborone
Brazil	Fabiane Niclotti †	19	Gramado
Bulgaria	Ivelina Petrova	18	Varna
Canada	Venessa Fisher	18	Waterdown
Cayman Islands	Stacey-Ann Kelly	25	Bodden Town
Chile	Gabriela Barros	23	Viña del Mar
China	Alina Zhang	23	Tianjin
Chinese Taipei	Janie Hsieh	26	Taipei
Colombia	Catherine Daza	21	Cali
Costa Rica	Nancy Soto	23	San Lorenzo
Croatia	Marijana Rupčić	18	Slavonia
Curaçao	Angeline da Silva	19	Willemstad
Cyprus	Nayia Iacovidou	21	Nicosia
Czech Republic	Lucie Váchová	19	Příbram
Denmark	Tina Christensen	22	Copenhagen
Dominican Republic	Larimar Fiallo	20	Santo Domingo
Ecuador	Susana Rivadeneira	24	Quito
Egypt	Heba El-Sisy	22	Mansoura
El Salvador	Gabriela Mejía	19	San Salvador
Estonia	Sirle Kalma	22	Viljandi
Ethiopia	Ferehyiwot Abebe	18	Bahir Dar
Finland	Mira Salo	23	Helsinki
France	Lætitia Bléger	23	Saint-Hippolyte
(Georgia (country)) Georgia	Nino Murtazashvilli	21	Tbilisi
Germany	Shermine Shahrivar	21	Süddeutschland
Ghana	Menaye Donkor	23	Accra
Greece	Valia Kakouti	23	Athens
Guatemala	Marva Weatherborn	20	Izabal
Guyana	Odessa Phillips	21	Vergenoegen
Hungary	Blanka Bakos	19	Ibrány
India	Tanushree Dutta	20	Jamshedpur
(Republic of Ireland) Ireland	Cathriona Duignam	23	Dublin
Israel	Gal Gadot	19	Rosh HaAyin
Italy	Laia Manetti	23	Milan
Jamaica	Christine Straw	24	Blue Mountains
Japan	Eri Machimoto	20	Fukuyama
Kenya	Anita Maina	21	Nairobi
Lebanon	Marie-José Hnein	19	Byblos
Malaysia	Andrea Fonseka	19	Petaling Jaya
Mexico	Rosalva Luna	21	Los Mochis
Netherlands	Lindsay Grace Pronk	21	The Hague
Nicaragua	Marifely Argüello	22	Managua
Nigeria	Anita Uwagbale	19	Lagos
Norway	Kathrine Sørland	24	Sola
Panama	Jessica Rodríguez	22	Panama City
Paraguay	Yanina González	24	Asunción
Peru	Liesel Holler	24	Cerro de Pasco
Philippines	Maricar Balagtas	21	Plaridel
Poland	Paulina Panek	21	Rzeszów
Puerto Rico	Alba Reyes	22	Cidra
Russia	Ksenia Kustova	20	Novosibirsk
Saint Vincent and the Grenadines	Laferne Fraser	20	Kingstown
Serbia and Montenegro	Dragana Dujović	19	Novi Sad
Singapore	Sandy Chua	19	Singapore
Slovakia	Zuzana Dvorská	19	Banská Bystrica
Slovenia	Sabina Remar	22	Trbovlje
South Africa	Joan Ramagoshi	25	Gauteng
South Korea	Yun-yong Choi	20	Seoul
Spain	María Jesús Ruiz	21	Andújar
Sweden	Katarina Wigander	21	Lerum
Switzerland	Bianca Sissing	25	Lucerne
Thailand	Morakot Kittisara	20	Bangkok
Trinidad and Tobago	Danielle Jones	26	Saint James
Turkey	Fatoş Seğmen	22	İzmir
Turks and Caicos Islands	Shamara Ariza	19	Grand Turk
Ukraine	Oleksandra Nikolayenko	22	Odesa
United States	Shandi Finnessey	25	Florissant
Uruguay	Nicole Dupont	20	Maldonado
Venezuela	Ana Karina Áñez	19	Barquisimeto
Vietnam	Khánh Ngọc Hoàng	19	Hải Dương
