= Alba Reyes =

Model, beauty queen, tv host

- Born: Alba Giselle Reyes Santos; June 15, 1981 (age 45); Cidra, Puerto Rico
- Education: University of Puerto Rico at Cayey (BS); University of Puerto Rico School of Law (JD); University of Houston Law Center (LL.M.)
- Height: 6 ft 0 in (1.83 m)
- Beauty pageant titleholder
- Title: Miss Cidra Universe 2004; Miss Puerto Rico Universe 2004
- Major competitions: Miss Puerto Rico Universe 2004 (Winner); Miss Universe 2004 (2nd Runner-Up) (Miss Photogenic)

Alba Giselle Reyes Santos (born June 15, 1981) is a Puerto Rican actress, model and beauty pageant titleholder who won the title of Miss Puerto Rico Universe 2004 in which later on she placed 2nd Runner-Up at the Miss Universe 2004 pageant, and won the award of Miss Photogenic. She is known for being the first woman with noticeably mixed (African and Indigenous) features to represent Puerto Rico at Miss Universe, different from past titleholders who all have distinct European features. She obtained a Juris Doctor magna cum laude from the University of Puerto Rico School of Law in 2011, although she never became a licensed lawyer.

In 2013, Reyes was a contestant on reality matchmaking competition television series Ready for Love, in which she competed for the attention of Ernesto Arguello where she finished as runner-up to Shandi Finnessey, whom she had competed against in Miss Universe 2004.

Awards and achievements
| Preceded by (South Africa) Cindy Nell | Miss Universe 2nd runner-up 2004 | Succeeded by (Dominican Republic) Renata Soñé |
| Preceded by (Puerto Rico) Carla Tricoli | Miss Photogenic Universe; 2004 | Succeeded by (Philippines) Gionna Cabrera |
| Preceded by Carla Tricoli | Miss Puerto Rico Universe; 2004 | Succeeded by Cynthia Olavarría |
| Preceded by - | Miss Cidra Universe; 2004 | Succeeded by - |
