= Lesley Turner =

Irish beauty queen (born 1983)

Lesley Turner (born 1983) is an Irish model and beauty pageant titleholder who represented her country at the Miss Universe 2001 pageant in San Juan, Puerto Rico. Turner competed in the Miss Ireland Universe 2001 pageant at the age of 18, and she won the title and the rights to represent Ireland at the Miss Universe 2001 pageant. She hails from Newport, County Tipperary.
