= Miss Perú 2002 =

- Date: April 27, 2002
- Presenters: Francisco Paz
- Venue: Studio 4, Barranco
- Broadcaster: América Televisión
- Entrants: 12
- Placements: 5
- Winner: Adriana Zubiate; Callao

After the election of Marina Mora as Miss World Peru 2001/02. The Miss Perú Universe 2002 pageant was held on April 27, 2002. That year, just 12 candidates were competing for that national crown. The chosen winner represented Peru at the Miss Universe 2002 and for the first time at Miss Earth 2002. The rest of the finalists would enter in different pageants.

== Placements ==
| Final Results | Contestant |
|---|---|
| Miss Peru Universe 2002 | Callao - Adriana Zubiate Flores |
| Miss Earth Peru 2002 | Arequipa - Claudia Ortiz de Zevallos |
| Top 5 | Loreto - Mónica Chacón D’Vettori; Moquegua - Jennifer Fon; Puno - Caroline Aguilar |

== Special awards ==
- Best Regional Costume - Distrito Capital - Danitza Autero Stanic
- Miss Photogenic - Arequipa - Claudia Ortiz de Zevallos
- Miss Elegance - Moquegua - Jennifer Fon
- Miss Body - Loreto - Mónica Chacón D’Vettori

== Delegates ==
- Áncash - Katiuska Romero
- Arequipa - Claudia Ortiz de Zevallos
- Cajamarca - Giovanna Durán
- Callao - Adriana Zubiate
- Distrito Capital - Danitza Autero Stanic
- Junín - Mariana Orihuela
- La Libertad- Maricris Rubio
- Loreto - Mónica Chacón D’Vettori
- Moquegua - Jennifer Fon
- Pasco - Jazmin Dorfman
- Puno - Caroline Aguilar
- Ucayali - Karla Casanova

== Trivia ==
- Mónica Chacón D’Vettori won Miss World Peru in 1996 and International Queen of Coffee in 1997.
- Katiuska Romero entered Miss Peru 1999.
- Claudia Ortiz de Zevallos and Danitza Autero Stanic would enter Miss Peru 2003.
- Adriana Zubiate sported the same Evening Gown that Miss Ica 2001, Mirna Cabrera, wore during Miss Peru 2001.
