= Eva Sisó =

Spanish model

- Born: 3 August 1979 (age 47); Soses, Spain
- Beauty pageant titleholder
- Title: Miss Spain
- Major competition: Miss Universe 2001

Eva Sisó Casals (born 3 August 1979) is a Spanish model and beauty pageant titleholder who represented her country at the Miss Universe 2001 pageant in Puerto Rico.

== Miss España 2001 ==
Sisó, a runway model, competed in the Miss España 2001 pageant, representing the province of Lleida, located in the Autonomous region of Catalonia. She was first runner-up, with Lorena Van Heerde Ayala of Alicante winning the crown. However, because Van Heerde was only 17 at the time, she was ineligible to compete at Miss Universe 2001 pageant, so Sisó represented Spain at the Miss Universe pageant instead. In Miss España 2001 she won several prizes, including Miss Elegance.

== Miss Universe 2001 ==
Sisó was considered a favorite in the Miss Universe 2001 pageant. She was the first to be called to be in the Top 10, but she did not enter the Top 5. She was 21 years old when she competed in the pageant.

== Trivia ==
- She was born in Soses, a small village in Lleida.
- She wore a torero costume as her national costume.
