= Nakera Simms =

Bahamian model

- Born: Nassau, The Bahamas
- Occupation: Model
- Beauty pageant titleholder
- Title: Miss Universe Bahamas 2001
- Major competitions: Miss Universe Bahamas 2001 (Winner); Miss Universe 2001 (Unplaced) (Miss Congeniality)

Nakera Simms is a Bahamian model and beauty pageant titleholder who was crowned Miss Universe Bahamas 2001 then represented the Bahamas at Miss Universe 2001 and was named Miss Congeniality. She attended Bethune–Cookman University.
