= Isis Casalduc =

Puerto Rican beauty pageant winner

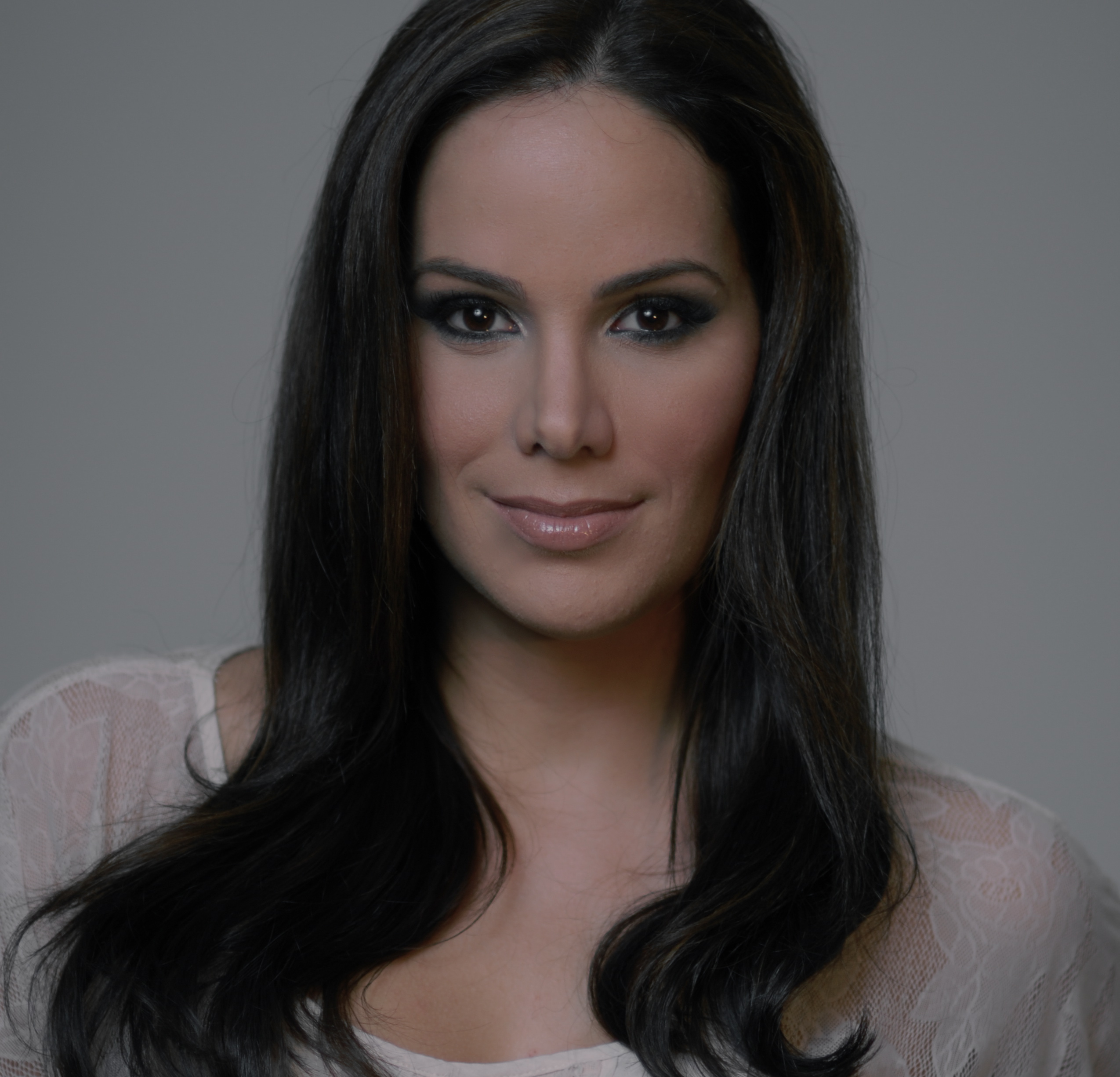
- Born: Isis Marie Casalduc González; April 3, 1981 (age 45); Utuado, Puerto Rico
- Height: 5 ft 3 in (1.60 m)
- Beauty pageant titleholder
- Title: Miss Utuado Universe 2002; Miss Puerto Rico Universe 2002
- Hair color: Brown
- Eye color: Brown
- Major competitions: Miss Puerto Rico Universe 2002 (Winner); Miss Universe 2002 (Unplaced) (Miss Photogenic) (2nd Place – Best National Costume)

Isis Marie Casalduc González is a Puerto Rican beauty pageant titleholder. As the Miss Puerto Rico Universe 2002 titleholder, she represented Puerto Rico at the Miss Universe 2002 where she won the Miss Photogenic competition and finished second for the title of Best National Costume after dressing in white lace with embroidered flowers. The former student at the University of Puerto Rico has been described as having a renowned career. Isis Casalduc is married to German filmmaker and entrepreneur Markus Neuert.

== See also ==
- Carla Tricoli
- List of Puerto Ricans

Awards and achievements
Preceded by Denise Quiñones (Ponce)	Miss Puerto Rico Universe; 2002	Succeeded by Carla Tricoli (Vieques)
Preceded by (Puerto Rico) Denise Quiñones	Miss Photogenic Universe; 2002	Succeeded by (Puerto Rico) Carla Tricoli
Preceded by -	Miss Utuado Universe; 2002	Succeeded by -
