= Carla Tricoli =

Puerto Rican beauty pageant titleholder

- Born: Carla Tricoli Rodriguez; 1982 (age 43–44); Vieques, Puerto Rico
- Beauty pageant titleholder
- Title: Miss Vieques Universe 2003; Miss Puerto Rico Universe 2003
- Major competitions: Miss Puerto Rico Universe 2003 (Winner); Miss Universe 2003 (Unplaced) (Miss Photogenic)

Carla Tricoli Rodriguez is a Puerto Rican actress and beauty pageant titleholder who was crowned Miss Puerto Rico Universe 2003.

As a child, Tricoli enjoyed music and she played the cuatro, an instrument that is popular in Puerto Rican music.

As an actress, she has been in a movie named The Losers.

Tricoli is a Spanish immersion teacher at Fort Hunt Elementary School in Alexandria, Virginia.

== See also ==
- List of Puerto Ricans
- Isis Casalduc

Awards and achievements
Preceded by (Puerto Rico) Isis Casalduc	Miss Photogenic Universe; 2003	Succeeded by (Puerto Rico) Alba Reyes
Preceded by Isis Casalduc	Miss Puerto Rico Universe; 2003	Succeeded by Alba Reyes
Preceded by -	Miss Vieques Universe; 2003	Succeeded by -
