= Justine Pasek =

Panamanian-Polish model and beauty queen

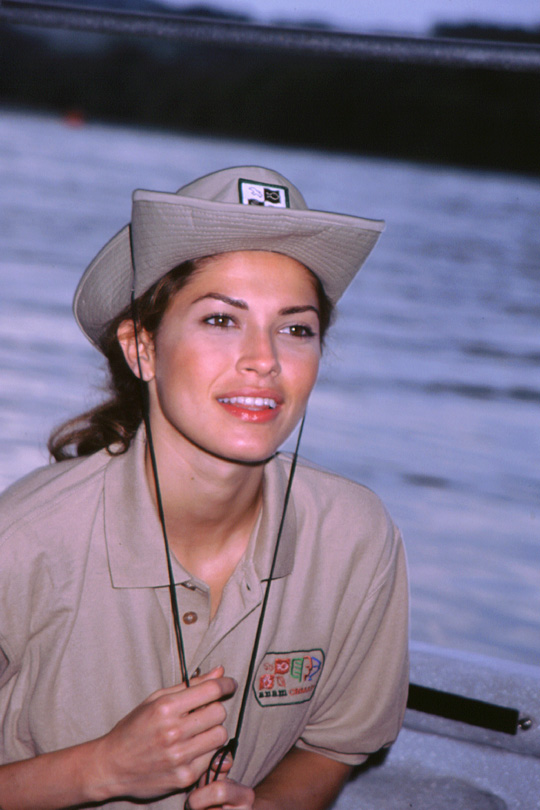
- Pasek in 2004.
- Born: Yostin Lissette Pasek Patiño; 29 August 1979 (age 47); Kharkiv, Ukrainian SSR, Soviet Union
- Height: 1.70 m (5 ft 7 in)
- Beauty pageant titleholder
- Title: Señorita Panamá 2001; Miss Universe 2002
- Eye color: brown
- Major competitions: Señorita Panamá 2001; (Winner); Miss Universe 2002; (Winner; Assumed) (Note: Pasek originally placed as first runner-up behind original winner Oxana Fedorova of Russia. 119 days after her crowning, Fedorova was terminated. As the first runner-up, Pasek assumed the title of Miss Universe 2002 in her place. The Miss Universe Organization considers Pasek to be the sole titleholder of the Miss Universe 2002 crown.)

Justine Lissette "Yostin" Pasek Patiño (Spanish pronunciation: [xusˈtin ˈpa.sek]; born 29 August 1979) is a Panamanian-Polish model and beauty queen who was crowned Miss Universe 2002. Originally the first runner-up at the Miss Universe 2002 competition, Pasek became the first ever runner-up to be crowned the winner after the termination of original winner Oxana Fedorova.

== Early life ==
Pasek was born in Kharkiv, USSR, to a Panamanian mother and a Polish father; her mother was a homemaker, while her father was an engineer. Despite her birth name being Yostin, Pasek was raised being affectionately referred to by her Polish name Justyna. She is the eldest of three children. The family resided in Soviet Ukraine for one year, and later moved to the village of Wożuczyn, near Zamość in southeastern Poland, close to the border with Ukraine. After her mother finished her studies in chemistry, the family left Poland and settled in Panama City, where Pasek was raised.

She has been the image model of numerous international brands and is a Goodwill Ambassador of FAO (Food and Agriculture Organization of the United Nations). In 2016, Pasek is the co-owner of the Señorita Panamá Organization and new national director for Miss Universe.

== Career ==
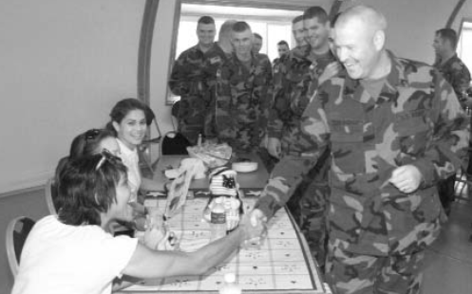
Miss Universe 2002, Pasek, with Miss USA 2002 and Miss Teen USA 2002 in 2003

Pasek's start in the modelling world took place when she joined the "Chica Modelo" (a model search) contest in 1996 where she won the award for Best Editorial Model. It also gave her the chance to work for Physical Modelos, her official modeling agency as of today.

=== Pageantry ===
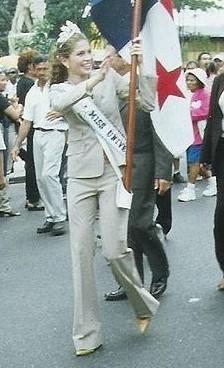
Pasek wearing the Mikimoto Crown at her welcoming parade in November 2002

After participating in the national contest Señorita Panamá 2001 on August 30, 2001; she won the Señorita Panamá Universe title, and represented her country at Miss Universe 2002, at the Coliseo Roberto Clemente, San Juan, Puerto Rico on May 29, 2002. She finished as first runner-up.

Four months after the pageant, Pasek became the first woman to assume the crown when the reigning Miss Universe Oxana Fedorova was removed by the organization for not fulfilling the duties stipulated in her contract. Pasek became the first Panamanian and Central American Miss Universe.

Pasek was formally crowned Miss Universe 2002 by then pageant co-owner Donald Trump in New York City. Pasek also received the Mikimoto Crown worth $250,000 in addition to an extensive prize package. As Miss Universe, Pasek represented the Miss Universe Organization. A self-described "citizen of the world", Pasek has since traveled to Japan, Indonesia, Thailand, Egypt, Aruba, Ecuador, Peru, Cuba, Canada, Mexico, and the United States. She championed the cause against HIV/AIDS and established the first HIV/AIDS prevention center in her country. As part of her year-long reign as Miss Universe, she lived in New York City in a riverside apartment provided by the Miss Universe Organization. She worked with the Global Health Council, the Harvard AIDS Institute, AmFAR, and the Centers for Disease Control's "Act Now" campaign.

== Notes ==
Awards and achievements
Preceded by (Russia) Oxana Fedorova (Terminated)	Miss Universe; 2002 (Assumed)	Succeeded by (Dominican Republic) Amelia Vega
Preceded by (Greece) Evelina Papantoniou	Miss Universe 1st Runner-Up; 2002	Succeeded by (Venezuela) Mariángel Ruiz
Preceded by Ivette Cordovez	Señorita Panamá; 2001	Succeeded by Stefanie de Roux
