= Figali Convention Center =

Indoor arena in Panama City, Panama

Coordinates: 8.939656°N 79.54649°W

- Interactive map of Figali Convention Center
- Location: Fort Amador, Panama City
- Capacity: 25,000

Construction
- Opened: June 2003

Figali Convention Center (or Amador Convention Center) is an indoor sports arena, in Fort Amador, Panama City, Panama. The capacity of the arena is 25,000.

Built in 2003, as the main venue for the Miss Universe 2003 pageant, which took place in Panama that year. Since then, it has been used mainly for many concerts and sports events, such as boxing and ice skating.

== Notable events ==
- On March 8, 2010, Metallica performed a show as part of their Latin American Leg of the " World Magnetic Tour " .
- On April 12, 2011, Shakira performed a sold-out show in the convention center as part of her 2011 "Sun Comes Out World Tour"
- On May 24, 2011, American superstar Miley Cyrus performed in the convention center as part of her 2011, Gypsy Heart Tour.
- On June 14, 2012, American popstar Jennifer Lopez kicked off her first world tour, Dance Again World Tour, at the convention center.
- June 10, 2015, Violetta cast performed here as part of their Violetta Live.
- October 15, 2015, Katy Perry with her Prismatic World Tour, it was the second-last show of this tour.
- April 21, 2017, Canadian pop singer Justin Bieber performed here as part of his Purpose World Tour.
- May 9, 2017, Soy Luna cast performed here as part of their Soy Luna en Concierto.

| Preceded by Roberto Clemente Coliseum (Puerto Rico) San Juan | Miss Universe venue 2003 | Succeeded by CEMEXPO (Ecuador) Quito |
