= CEMEXPO =

- Centro de Exposiciones y Convenciones Mitad del Mundo
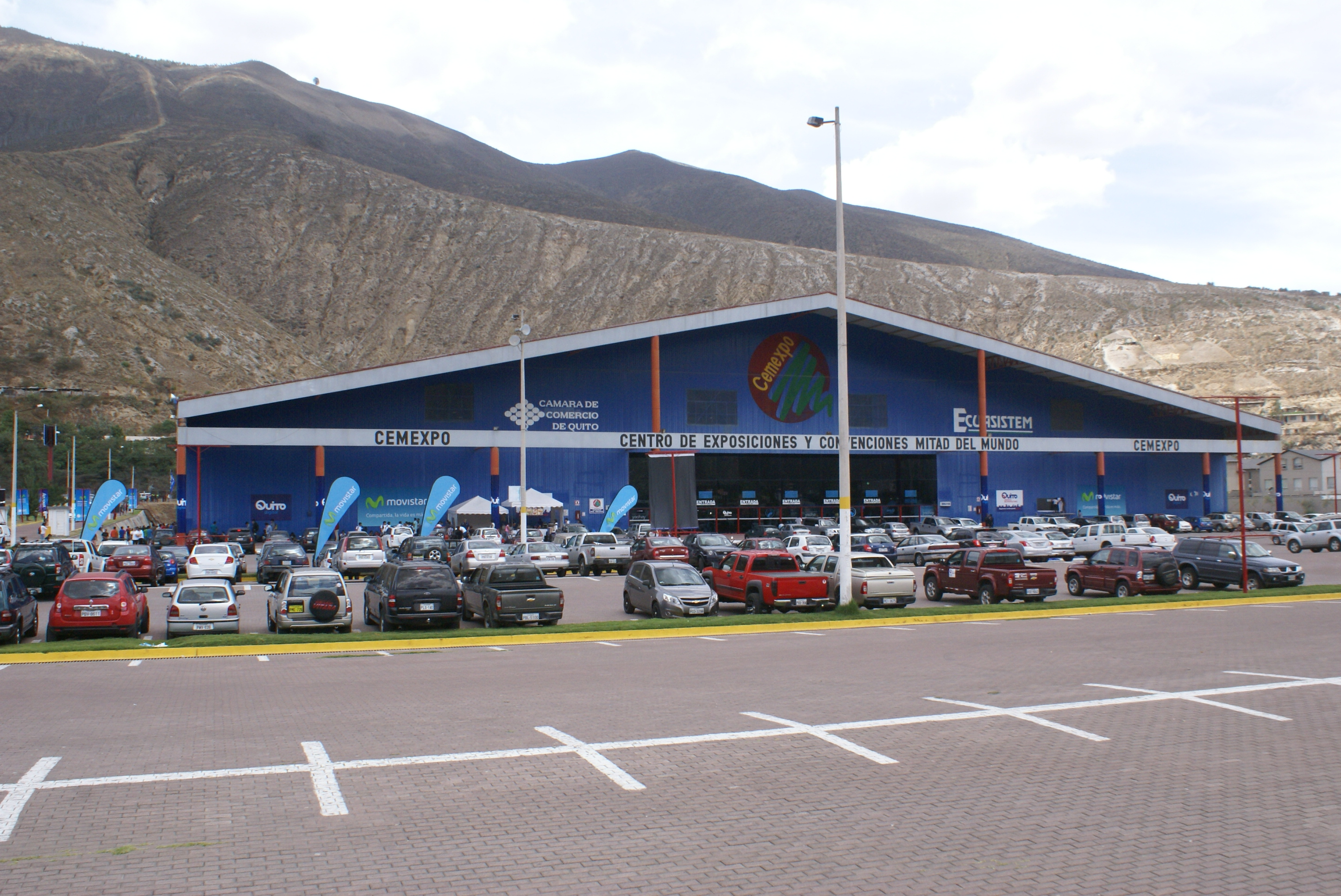
- CEMEXPO in 2013
- Alternative names: Centro de Convenciones CEMEXPO

General information
- Status: Completed
- Type: Convention center
- Location: Quito, Pichincha, Ecuador, Km. 9 Manuel Cordova Galarza freeway via Mitad del Mundo
- Inaugurated: September 1999

Technical details
- Floor area: More than 13,500 m^{2} (145,000 sq ft)

CEMEXPO (Centro de Exposiciones y Convenciones Mitad del Mundo) is an international convention center located at Manuel Córdova Galarza freeway km. 9. Quito, Ecuador.

== History ==
It was inaugurated in September 1999 and has a surface area of 85,253 square meters. During its time it has hosted various corporate and entertainment events. Including as a Rave venue for international techno artists.

== Events ==
- Miss Universe 2004
- Miss Ecuador 2008
- Miss Ecuador 2010
- Campus Party Ecuador 2015

Preceded by Figali Convention Center; Panama City	Miss Universe venue 2004	Succeeded by Impact Arena (Thailand) Pak Kret
