= Helen Yarmak =

Russian fashion designer

- Елена Ярмак
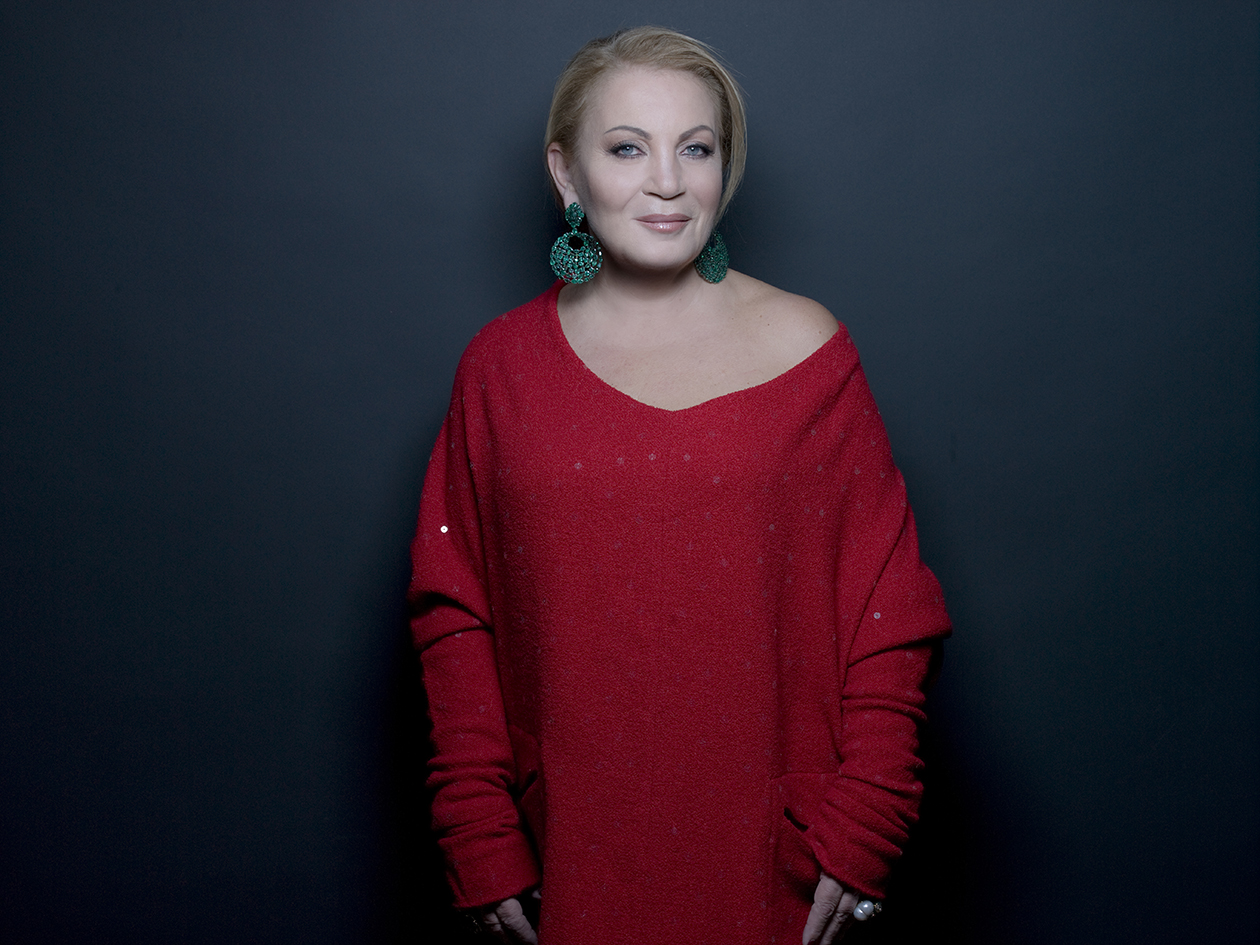
- Born: July 6, 1949 (age 77); Kyiv, Ukraine
- Education: Taras Shevchenko National University of Kyiv

Yelena Davydovna Yarmak (Russian: Елена Давыдовна Ярмак; born July 6, 1949, in Kyiv, Ukrainian Soviet Socialist Republic), known professionally as Helen Yarmak, is a Russian fashion designer and the founder of the Helen Yarmak fashion house.

== Background ==
Yarmak studied as a mathematician at Taras Shevchenko University in Kyiv. She earned the Doctor of Sciences title and academy seats at the French Academy of Architecture and the New York Academy of Sciences. She transitioned into designs at Moscow.

Vogue magazine named Yarmak the "Mistress of a Sable Mountain" (Vogue, November 1998). She was the first Russian designer to have a collection appear on a Vogue cover.
