= Yulia Yanina =

Russian fashion designer

- Born: Saratov, Soviet Union
- Occupation: fashion designer
- Years active: 1993—present
- Notable work: Yanina Couture

Yulia Yanina (born in Saratov) is a Russian fashion designer. She is founder and creative director of the Yanina Fashion House, a family run venture.

In 2021, the Fédération de la Houte Couture et de la Mode announced Yanina officially as Guest Member of the Paris Fashion Week, thus including Yanina Fashion House into the couture club that defines the history and the trends of global fashion. Starting from SS2022 season, Yanina Couture (whose collections have been shown at each Week since 2010 and whose creations are worn by top global celebrities at the biggest events and red carpets around the world) is listed on the FHCM’s calendar.

== Life ==
Yanina has a degree in Arts. In 1993 she founded her own fashion house. In 2007, Yanina Couture debuted at AltaRomaAltaModa in Rome.

Since 2010, her fashion house shows at the Paris Fashion Week and she dresses celebrities for red carpets like the Cannes Film Festival.

The Paris Fashion Institute has included the Yanina Fashion House study course into its program.

== Recognition ==
Yanina was the first Russian fashion designer to partner with amFAR, the world’s largest charity organization. Yanina is a celebrity dresser for ceremonies like the Oscars, Grammy Awards and more. Her clientele list includes Lady Gaga, Rita Ora, Naomi Campbell, Gigi Hadid.

Yanina took part in the Animalia Fashion exhibition at the Uffizi Gallery and in the Dentelles en Scéne show at the Musée de la Dentelle de Caudry. To celebrate the 25th anniversary of the Yanina Fashion House, the Russian Orthodox Spiritual and Cultural Centre in Paris held the 25 Years — 25 Iconic Dresses exhibit.
