= Miss Universe 2001 =

50th Miss Universe pageant

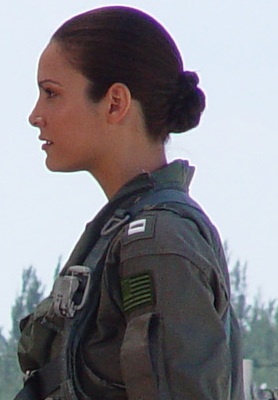
- Denise Quiñones
- Date: May 11, 2001
- Presenters: Elle Macpherson; Naomi Campbell; Todd Newton; Brook Lee
- Entertainment: Ricky Martin; La Ley
- Venue: Coliseo Rubén Rodríguez, Bayamón, Puerto Rico
- Broadcaster: CBS
- Entrants: 77
- Placements: 10
- Debuts: Slovenia
- Withdrawals: Australia; Belize; Denmark; Great Britain; Guam; Hong Kong; Mauritius; Namibia; Sint Martin
- Returns: Antigua and Barbuda; Curaçao; Nicaragua; Northern Mariana Islands; Turkey; United States Virgin Islands
- Winner: Denise Quiñones; Puerto Rico
- Congeniality: Nakera Simms, Bahamas
- Best National Costume: Kim Sa-rang, South Korea
- Photogenic: Denise Quiñones, Puerto Rico

Miss Universe 2001 was the 50th Miss Universe pageant, held at the Coliseo Rubén Rodríguez in Bayamón, Puerto Rico, on May 11, 2001.

At the conclusion of the event, Lara Dutta of India crowned Denise Quiñones of Puerto Rico as Miss Universe 2001. This was Puerto Rico's fourth win in the history of the pageant.

Contestants from seventy-seven countries competed in this pageant. The competition was hosted by Elle Macpherson and Naomi Campbell. Todd Newton acted as backstage correspondent, while Miss Universe 1997 Brook Lee provided commentary for the whole event. Ricky Martin and La Ley performed in this edition.

== Background ==
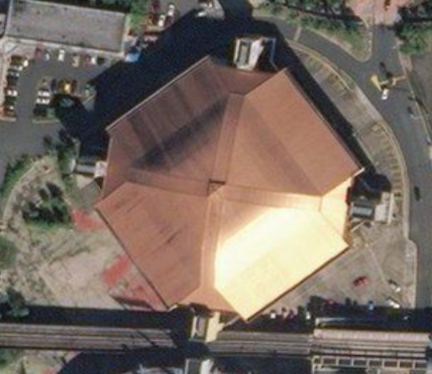
Coliseo Rubén Rodríguez, the venue of Miss Universe 2001

=== Location and date ===
After twenty-nine years, the Miss Universe pageant returned to San Juan to hold its 50th edition on May 11, 2001. According to Puerto Rico's tourism director, Jorge Pesquera, the final telecast of the competition will help promote the territory to potential tourists.

=== Selection of participants ===
Seventy-seven countries and territories competed in the pageant. Three candidates were appointed to their position to replace the original winner.

==== Replacements ====
Poland was to be represented by the first runner-up of Miss Polonia, Malgorzata Rozniecka. However, studies prevented her from attending, and the organization replaced her with Monika Gruda. The organization invited Miss Russia 2001, Oxana Fedorova, to attend the pageant, but was unable to compete due to her studies. She was replaced by first runner-up, Oxana Kalandyrets, who reached the top 10. Fedorova would go on to win the following year's Miss Universe pageant, only to be replaced with her runner-up four months later.

Miss Spain 2001, Lorena van Heerde Ayala, was unable to compete as she was underage. She was replaced by first runner-up, Eva Sisó. Ayala was due to compete in Miss Universe 2002, but after the threat of lawsuit by her family against the Miss España Organization for breach of contract, she cut all ties with the Miss España organization and lost the right to represent Spain at any international pageant.

==== Debuts, returns, and withdrawals ====
This edition marked the debut of Slovenia; and the returns of Antigua and Barbuda who last competed in 1979; and Curaçao, Nicaragua, the Northern Mariana Islands, Turkey, and the United States Virgin Islands who last competed in 1999. Australia, Belize, Denmark, Great Britain, Guam, Hong Kong, Mauritius, Namibia and Sint Maarten withdrew after their respective organizations failed to hold a national competition or appoint a delegate. Phan Thu Ngân of Vietnam got married and refused to compete in Miss Universe 2001.

=== Controversies during the pageant ===
Élodie Gossuin of France was confirmed to be a woman by medical examination, when it was rumoured that she was a transsexual.

Juliana Borges of Brazil admitted to the media that she had undergone plastic surgery nineteen times, stating "It's like studying for a math exam and you get good grades... you study and you work hard to have the perfect body". Despite a public outcry she was allowed to compete.

== Results ==
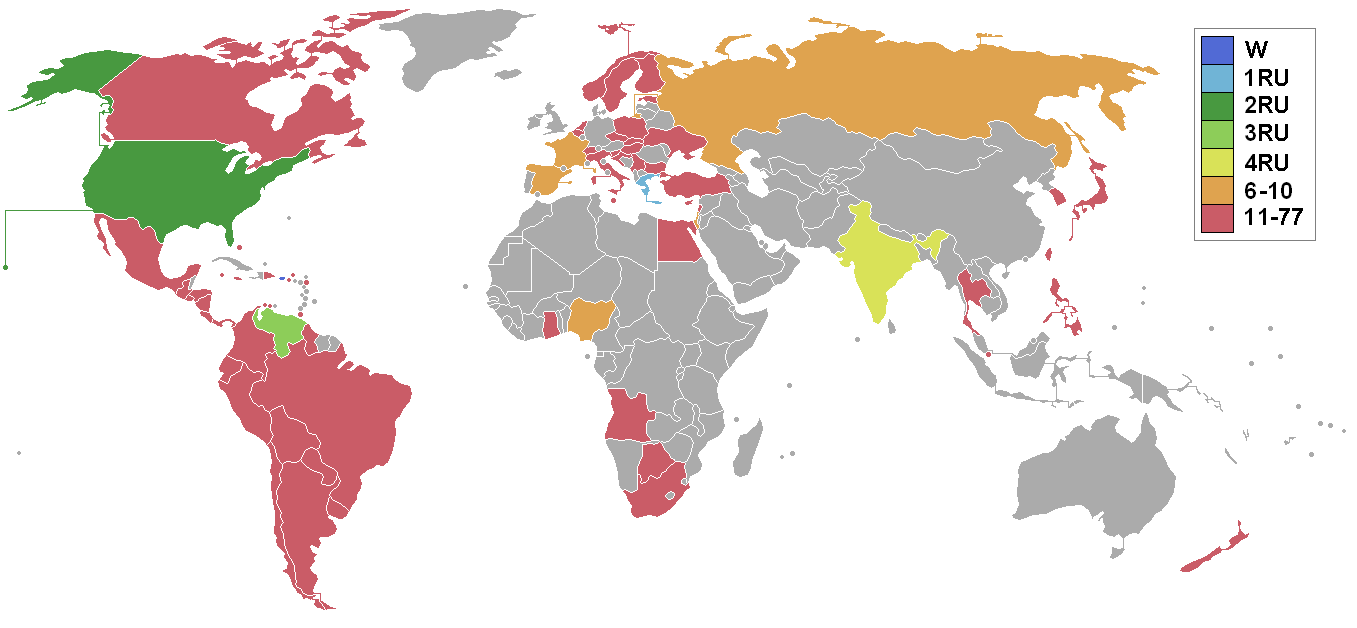
Miss Universe 2001 participating countries and territories

=== Placements ===
Placement	Contestant
Miss Universe 2001	Puerto Rico – Denise Quiñones
1st Runner-Up	Greece – Evelina Papantoniou
2nd Runner-Up	United States – Kandace Krueger
3rd Runner-Up	Venezuela – Eva Ekvall
4th Runner-Up	India – Celina Jaitly
Top 10	France – Élodie Gossuin; Israel – Ilanit Levy; Nigeria – Agbani Darego; Russia – Oksana Kalandyrets; Spain – Eva Sisó

=== Special awards ===
Award	Winner
Miss Photogenic	Puerto Rico – Denise Quiñones
Clairol Herbal Essences Style Award	Puerto Rico – Denise Quiñones
Best in Swimsuit	Puerto Rico – Denise Quiñones
Miss Congeniality	(The Bahamas) Bahamas – Nakera Simms
Best National Costume	South Korea – Kim Sa-rang

== Pageant ==
=== Format ===
Ten semifinalists were chosen through the preliminary competition— composed of the swimsuit and evening gown competitions and closed-door interviews. The ten semifinalists competed in the evening gown and swimsuit competitions and were narrowed down to five afterward. The five finalists competed in the question and answer round and the final question round, after which Miss Universe 2001 and her runners-up were announced.

=== Selection committee ===
==== Final broadcast ====
- Mini Andén – Swedish model, actress, and television personality
- Marc Anthony – American singer
- Tyson Beckford – Jamaican-American model and actor
- Marc Bouwer – South African fashion designer
- Kel Gleason – A contestant from Survivor: The Australian Outback
- Richard Johnson – American columnist for the New York Post
- Dayanara Torres – Miss Universe 1993 from Puerto Rico
- Veronica Webb – American model and actress

== Contestants ==
Seventy-seven contestants competed for the title.

Country/Territory	Contestant	Age (Note: Ages at the time of the pageant)	Hometown
Angola	Hidianeth Cussema	19	Cuíto
Antigua and Barbuda	Janil Bird	22	St. John's
Argentina	Romina Incicco	18	Buenos Aires
Aruba	Denise Balinge	21	Oranjestad
(The Bahamas) Bahamas	Nakera Simms	22	Nassau
Belgium	Dina Tersago	22	Puurs
Bolivia	Claudia Arano	19	Santa Cruz de la Sierra
Botswana	Mataila Sikwane	23	Gaborone
Brazil	Juliana Borges	22	Santa Maria
British Virgin Islands	Kacy Frett	19	Road Town
Bulgaria	Ivaila Bakalova	19	Varna
Canada	Cristina Rémond	20	Montreal
Cayman Islands	Jacqueline Bush	25	George Town
Chile	Carolina Gámez	19	Santiago
Colombia	Andrea Nocetti	23	Cartagena
Costa Rica	Paola Calderón	20	Guanacaste
Croatia	Maja Cecić-Vidoš	20	Rijeka
Curaçao	Fatima St. Jago	22	Willemstad
Cyprus	Stella Demetriou	21	Nicosia
Czech Republic	Petra Kocarova	22	South Moravia
Dominican Republic	Claudia Cruz de los Santos	18	San Juan
Ecuador	Jessica Bermudez	23	Guayaquil
Egypt	Sarah Shaheen	19	Cairo
El Salvador	Grace Marie Zabaneh	22	San Salvador
Estonia	Inna Roos	19	Tallinn
Finland	Heidi Willman	19	Jyväskylä
France	Élodie Gossuin	20	Reims
Germany	Claudia Bechstein	22	Thuringia
Ghana	Precious Agyare	18	Accra
Greece	Evelina Papantoniou	22	Athens
Guatemala	Rosa María Castañeda	20	Chiquimula
Honduras	Olenka Fuschich	21	Yoro
Hungary	Agnes Helbert	21	Budapest
India	Celina Jaitly	21	Shimla
(Republic of Ireland) Ireland	Lesley Turner	19	Newport
Israel	Ilanit Levy	18	Rehovot
Italy	Stefania Maria	20	Lombardy
Jamaica	Zahra Burton	21	Kingston
Japan	Misao Arauchi	19	Aomori
Lebanon	Sandra Rizk	19	Koura District
Malaysia	Tung Mei Chin	20	Kuantan
Malta	Rosalie Thewma	19	Birżebbuġa
Mexico	Jacqueline Bracamontes	21	Guadalajara
Netherlands	Reshma Roopram	22	South Holland
New Zealand	Kateao Nehua	19	Ngātiwai
Nicaragua	Ligia Cristina Argüello	21	Managua
Nigeria	Agbani Darego	18	Lagos
Northern Mariana Islands	Janet King	24	Tinian
Norway	Linda Marshall	22	Buskerud
Panama	Ivette Cordovez	21	Panama City
Paraguay	Rosmary Brítez	21	Caazapá
Peru	Viviana Rivasplata	23	Lambayeque
Philippines	Zorayda Ruth Andam	24	Baguio
Poland	Monika Gruda	19	Masovia
Portugal	Telma Santos	19	Lisbon
Puerto Rico	Denise Quiñones	20	Ponce
Russia	Oksana Kalandyrets	20	Khanty-Mansi
Singapore	Jaime Teo	24	Singapore
Slovakia	Zuzana Baštúrová	19	Revúca
Slovenia	Minka Alagič	21	Maribor
South Africa	Jo-Ann Strauss	20	Cape Town
South Korea	Kim Sa-rang	23	Seoul
Spain	Eva Sisó	21	Soses
Sweden	Malin Olsson	19	Skattungbyn
Switzerland	Mahara McKay	19	Zurich
Taiwan	Hsin Ting Chiang	21	Taipei
Thailand	Varinthorn Phadoongvithee	24	Nonthaburi
Trinidad and Tobago	Alexia Charlerie	24	Tunapuna–Piarco
Turkey	Sedef Avcı	19	Adana
Turks and Caicos Islands	Shereen Novie Gardiner	19	Cockburn Town
Ukraine	Yuliya Linova	23	Zaporizhzhia
United States	Kandace Krueger	24	Austin
United States Virgin Islands	Lisa Hasseba Wynne	26	Charlotte Amalie
Uruguay	Carla Piaggio	25	Montevideo
Venezuela	Eva Ekvall	18	Caracas
(Serbia and Montenegro) Yugoslavia	Ana Janković	19	Belgrade
Zimbabwe	Tsungai Muswerakuenda	23	Harare
