= Miss Universe 2002 =

51st Miss Universe competition, beauty pageant edition

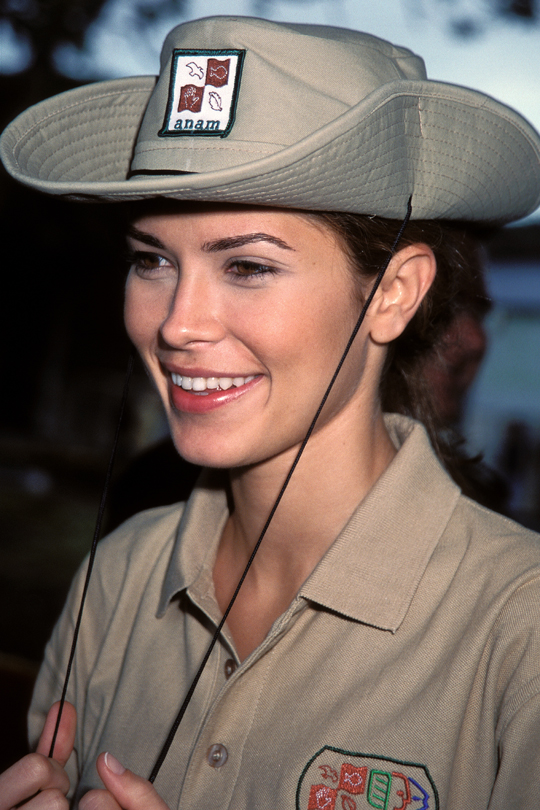
- Justine Pasek
- Date: 29 May 2002
- Presenters: Phil Simms; Daisy Fuentes; Brook Lee
- Entertainment: Marc Anthony
- Venue: Coliseo Roberto Clemente, San Juan, Puerto Rico
- Broadcaster: CBS
- Entrants: 75
- Placements: 10
- Debuts: Albania; China
- Withdrawals: Argentina; Botswana; Lebanon; Malta; New Zealand; Paraguay; Taiwan; Turks and Caicos Islands; Zimbabwe
- Returns: Australia; Guyana; Kenya; Mauritius; Namibia
- Winner: Oxana Fedorova (Russia) (Terminated); Justine Pasek (Panama) (Assumed)
- Congeniality: Merlisa Rhonda George, (United States Virgin Islands)
- Best National Costume: Vanessa Mendoza (Colombia)
- Photogenic: Isis Casalduc, (Puerto Rico)

Miss Universe 2002 was the 51st Miss Universe pageant, held at the Roberto Clemente Coliseum in San Juan, Puerto Rico, on 29 May 2002.

At the conclusion of the event, Denise Quiñones of Puerto Rico crowned Oxana Fedorova of Russia as Miss Universe 2002. This was the first time that Russia had been crowned Miss Universe.

Fedorova had her title terminated four months later as she could not travel to fulfill her duties, and was replaced by first runner-up Justine Pasek of Panama.

Contestants from seventy-five countries competed in this pageant. The competition was hosted by Phil Simms and Daisy Fuentes, and Miss Universe 1997 Brook Lee was the backstage correspondent. Marc Anthony performed at this pageant. This was also the last Miss Universe edition to be aired on CBS.

== Background ==
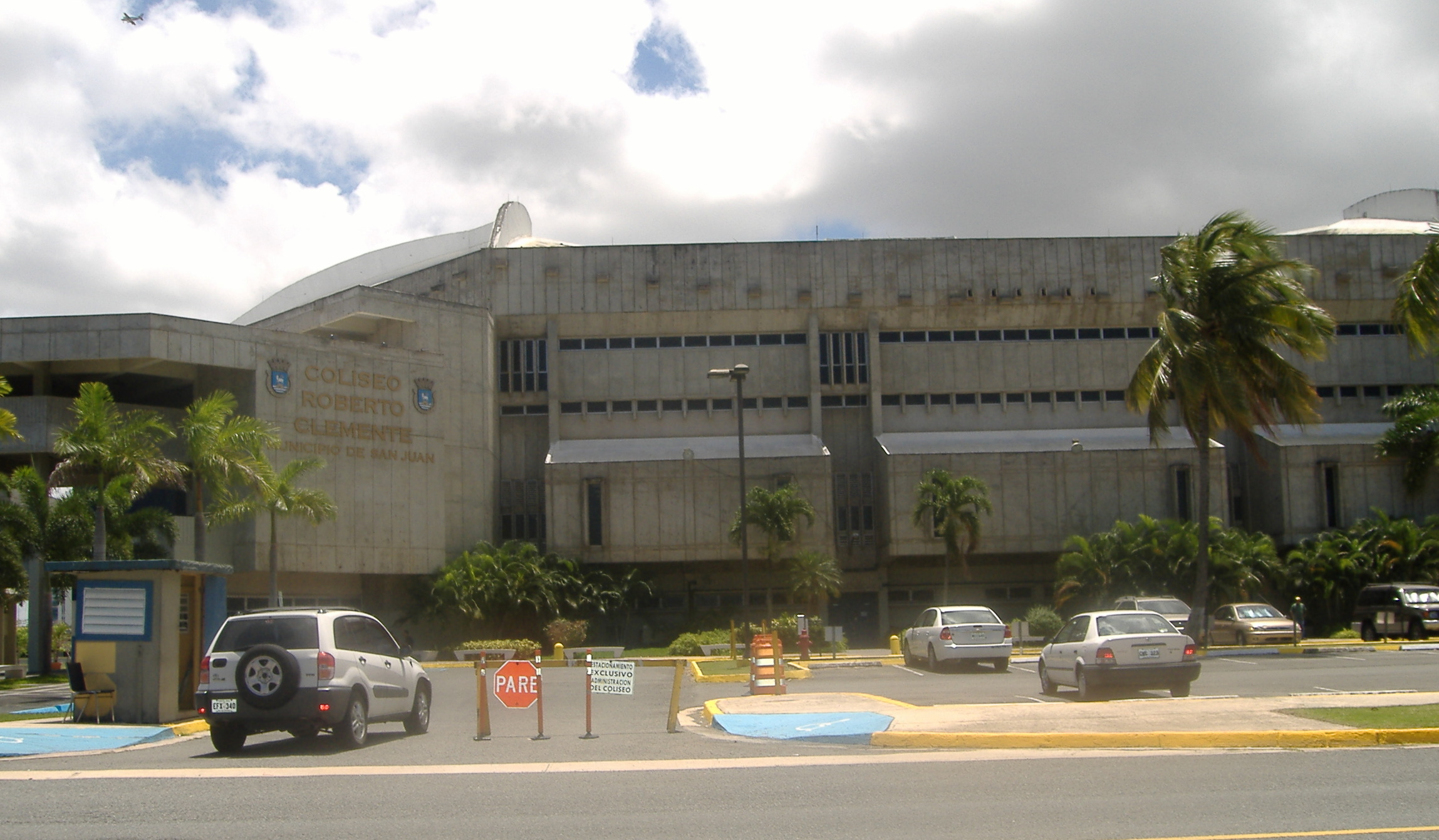
Coliseo Roberto Clemente, Miss Universe 2002 venue

=== Location and date ===
In December 2001, Jorge Santini, then-mayor of San Juan and Miss Universe 2001 Denise Quiñones attended at a news conference in San Juan where it was announced that the 2002 pageant will be held in Puerto Rico for the second consecutive year. The city of San Juan was chosen as the venue of the pageant from eight other cities.

=== Selection of participants ===
Seventy-five countries and territories competed in the pageant. One candidate was appointed to her position to replace the original winner.

==== Replacements ====
Lorena Ayala, the winner of Miss España 2001 pageant, cut all ties with the Miss España organization and lost the right to represent Spain at any international pageant after a threat of a lawsuit against the Miss España Organization by her family, due to a contractual breach with the organization. Ayala was replaced by Vania Millán at the request of the Miss Universe Organization.

==== Debuts and withdrawals ====
The 2002 edition saw the debuts of Albania and China, and the returns of Kenya who last competed in Miss Universe 1995, Guyana who last competed in Miss Universe 1999, and Australia, Mauritius, and Namibia who last competed in Miss Universe 2000. Karen Russell of Belize and Yana Booth of Great Britain withdrew due to a change of the local franchise holder. Christina Sawaya, Miss Lebanon 2001, withdrew due to her support of the Second Intifada, stating that she wouldn't compete with Miss Israel 2002, Yamit Har-Noy at the pageant. Euwonka Selver of the Turks and Caicos Islands had her title removed a few weeks before leaving for the pageant, and the organization didn't replace her. Shirley Yeung of Hong Kong, Loredana Zammit of Malta, and Gabriela Riquelme of Paraguay withdrew after their respective organizations lost their licenses. Hong Kong began sending their candidates to Miss China in 2003. Argentina, Barbados, Botswana, New Zealand, and Taiwan withdrew after their respective organizations failed to hold a national competition or appoint a delegate.

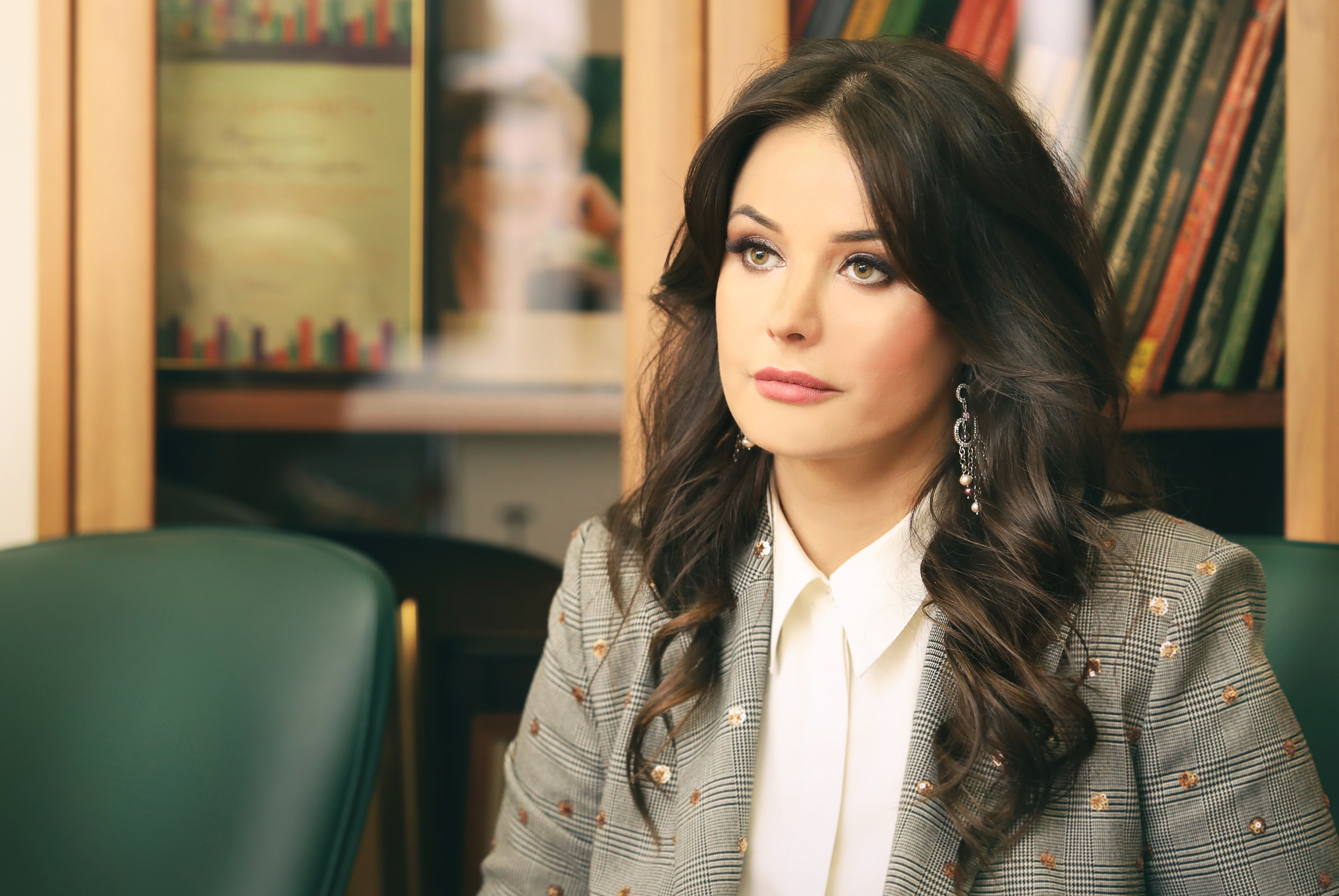
Oxana Fedorova, the original winner

=== Replacement of Oxana Fedorova ===
In September 2002, four months after winning Miss Universe, Fedorova was replaced by Justine Pasek, making her the first Miss Universe to be removed during their reign. According to then-president of the Miss Universe Organization Paula Shugart, Fedorova was not able to fulfill her duties as she needed to spend a lot of time in Russia. Fedorova was expected to travel extensively and make personal appearances as part of her duties, but she declined to participate in some of those assignments, including the 2002 Miss Teen USA pageant.

In an interview with Russian TV Channel 2, Fedorova said she was surprised when the Miss Universe Organization described her resignation as an ouster, and that the decision to return the crown was up to her. According to Fedorova, the reason why she spent so much time in Russia was because of her education. Fedorova is a police lieutenant in Russia, and at the time she was Miss Universe, she was finishing her dissertation at the Academy of Internal Affairs which she defended in October of the same year. Fedorova also refuted speculations that she is pregnant because she is not yet married.

First runner-up Justine Pasek was crowned as Miss Universe 2002 at a press conference in New York City by Donald Trump.

== Results ==
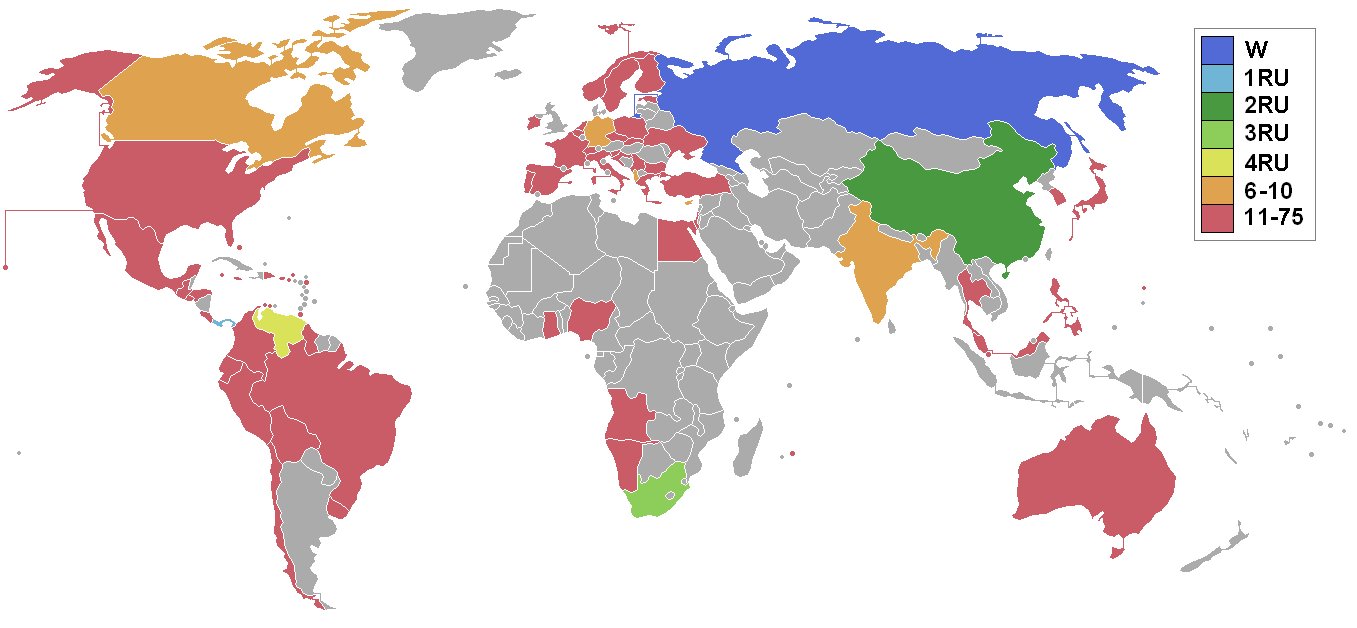
Miss Universe 2002 participating countries and territories

=== Placements ===
Placement	Contestant
Miss Universe 2002	Russia – Oxana Fedorova (terminated)
1st Runner-Up	Panama – Justine Pasek (assumed)
2nd Runner-Up	China – Ling Zhuo
3rd Runner-Up	South Africa – Vanessa Carreira
4th Runner-Up	Venezuela – Cynthia Lander
Top 10	Albania – Anisa Kospiri; Canada – Neelam Verma; Cyprus – Demetra Eleftheriou; Germany — Natascha Börger; India – Neha Dhupia

=== Special awards ===
Award	Winner
Miss Photogenic	Puerto Rico – Isis Casalduc
Miss Congeniality	United States Virgin Islands – Merlisa George

==== Best National Costume ====
Placement	Contestant
Winner	Colombia – Vanessa Mendoza
1st runner-up	Puerto Rico – Isis Casalduc
2nd runner-up	Dominican Republic – Ruth Ocumárez

== Pageant ==
=== Format ===
Same with 2001, ten semifinalists were chosen through the preliminary competition— composed of the swimsuit and evening gown competitions and closed-door interviews. The ten semifinalists competed in the evening gown and swimsuit competitions and were narrowed down to five afterward. The five finalists competed in the question and answer round and the final question round, after which Miss Universe 2002 and her runners-up were announced.

=== Selection committee ===
==== Final broadcast ====
- Marshall Faulk – American football player
- Tyrese Gibson – American singer, actor, and model
- Marisol Malaret – Miss Universe 1970 from Puerto Rico
- Christopher McDonald – American actor
- Yue-Sai Kan – Chinese-American actress, host, humanitarian, and entrepreneur
- Oswald Mendez – A contestant from The Amazing Race 2
- Nicole Miller – American fashion designer and businesswoman
- Gena Lee Nolin – American actress and model
- Tatjana Patitz – German model
- Ethan Zohn – American television personality

== Contestants ==
Seventy-five contestants competed for the title.

Country/Territory	Contestant	Age (Note: Ages at the time of the pageant)	Hometown
Albania	Anisa Kospiri	19	Tirana
Angola	Giovana Leite	18	Luanda
Antigua and Barbuda	Aisha Ralph	24	St. John's
Aruba	Deyanira Frank	23	San Nicolaas
Australia	Sarah Davies	19	Brisbane
The Bahamas	Nadia Albury	21	Nassau
Belgium	Ann Van Elsen	22	Mol
Bolivia	Paola Coimbra	21	Santa Cruz de la Sierra
Brazil	Joseane Oliveira	20	Canoas
British Virgin Islands	Anestasia Tonge	18	Tortola
Bulgaria	Elina Georgieva	19	Sofia
Canada	Neelam Verma	26	Montreal
Cayman Islands	Shannon McLean	24	East End
Chile	Nicole Rencoret	25	Santiago
China	Zhuo Ling	19	Shanghai
Colombia	Vanessa Mendoza	20	Unguía
Costa Rica	Merilyn Villalta	22	Cartago
Croatia	Ivana Paris	18	Pazin
Curaçao	Ayanette Statia	19	Willemstad
Cyprus	Demetra Eleftheriou	19	Nicosia
Czech Republic	Diana Kobzanová	20	Roudná
Dominican Republic	Ruth Ocumárez	20	Santo Domingo
Ecuador	Isabel Ontaneda-Pinto	23	Quito
Egypt	Sally Shaheen	24	Cairo
El Salvador	Elisa Sandoval	22	San Salvador
Estonia	Jana Tafenau	19	Tallinn
Finland	Janette Broman	20	Lieto
France	Sylvie Tellier	20	Nantes
Germany	Natascha Börger	21	Bönningstedt
Ghana	Stephanie Walkins-Fia	22	Accra
Greece	Lena Paparigopoulou	21	Athens
Guatemala	Carina Velasquez	21	Zacapa
Guyana	Mia Rahaman	22	Georgetown
Honduras	Erika Ramirez	18	Atlántida
Hungary	Edit Friedl	23	Budapest
India	Neha Dhupia	21	Delhi
(Republic of Ireland) Ireland	Lisa O'Sullivan	20	South Dublin
Israel	Yamit Har-Noy	20	Oranit
Italy	Anna Rigon	23	Vicenza
Jamaica	Sanya Hughes	19	Kingston
Japan	Mina Chiba	24	Tokyo
Kenya	Julie Njeru	19	Laikipia
Malaysia	Karen Lit Eit Ang	25	Kuching
Mauritius	Karen Alexandre	22	Port Louis
Mexico	Ericka Cruz	20	Mérida
Namibia	Michelle Heitha	26	Windhoek
Netherlands	Kim Kötter	19	Losser
Nicaragua	Marianela Lacayo	21	Managua
Nigeria	Chinenye Ochuba	18	Lagos
Northern Mariana Islands	Virginia Gridley	22	Chalan Kanoa
Norway	Hege Hatlo	21	Rogaland
Panama	Justine Pasek	22	Panama City
Peru	Adriana Zubiate	20	Callao
Philippines	Karen Loren Agustín	19	Manila
Poland	Joanna Dozdrowska	23	Szczecin
Portugal	Iva Lamarão	19	Ovar
Puerto Rico	Isis Casalduc	21	Utuado
Russia	Oxana Fedorova	24	Saint Petersburg
Singapore	Nuraliza Osman	25	Singapore
Slovakia	Eva Džodlová	19	Prešov
Slovenia	Iris Mulej	20	Kranj
South Africa	Vanessa Carreira	22	Boksburg
South Korea	Kim Min-kyoung	20	Seoul
Spain	Vania Millan	24	Almería
Sweden	Malou Hansson	19	Järfälla
Switzerland	Jennifer Ann Gerber	20	Aargau
Thailand	Janjira Janchome	19	Phitsanulok
Trinidad and Tobago	Nasma Mohammed	23	Princes Town
Turkey	Çağla Kubat	23	İzmir
Ukraine	Liliana Gorova	20	Kyiv
United States	Shauntay Hinton	23	Washington, D.C.
United States Virgin Islands	Merlisa Rhonda George	26	Saint Croix
Uruguay	Fiorella Fleitas	20	Canelones
Venezuela	Cynthia Lander	19	Caracas
(Serbia and Montenegro) Yugoslavia	Slađana Božović	21	Kragujevac
