= Miss Russia 2017 =

25th edition of the Miss Russia competition

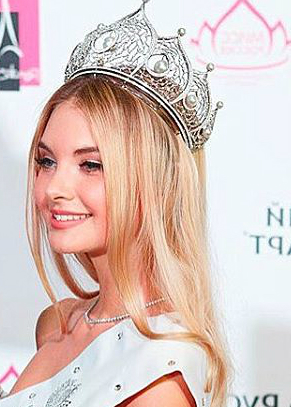
- Miss Russia 2017
- Date: 15 April 2017
- Presenters: Maxim Privalov; Victoria Lopyreva
- Entertainment: Elka; Stas Piekha; Nyusha; Ani Lorak; Dmitry Malikov
- Venue: Barvikha Luxury Village, Moscow
- Broadcaster: STS
- Entrants: 50
- Placements: 20
- Withdrawals: Angarsk; Belgorod Oblast; Chelyabinsk Oblast; Dagestan; Irkutsk Oblast; Ivanovo Oblast; Kabardino-Balkaria; Kaliningrad Oblast; Kemerovo Oblast; Karelia; Khimki; Kirov Oblast; Krasnodar City; Krasnodar Krai; Murmansk Oblast; North Ossetia-Alania; Orenburg Oblast; Oryol Oblast; Petrozavodsk; Rostov Oblast; Sayansk; Sevastopol; Sochi; Sverdlovsk Oblast; Tomsk Oblast; Tuapse; Ulyanovsk Oblast; Usolye Sibirskoye; Volgograd Oblast; Yalta; Yamalo-Nenets; Yaroslavl Oblast; Zabaykalsky Krai
- Returns: Bakhchysarai; Belebey; Berezovsky; Cheboksary; Chelyabinsk; Chuvashia; Kalmykia; Kaluga; Khabarovsk; Krasnoyarsk Krai; Lyubertsy; Mozhaysk; Novocheboksarsk; Novokuznetsk; Novorossiysk; Novosibirsk; Primorsky Krai; Ryazan; Sakhalin Oblast; Samara; Saratov; Simferopol; Syktyvkar; Tambov; Tver; Tver Oblast; Velikiy Novgorod; Vladivostok; Volgodonsk; Vologda; Zhukovsky
- Winner: Polina Popova; Sverdlovsk Oblast

Miss Russia 2017 the 25th edition of the Miss Russia pageant, was held in concert hall Barvikha Luxury Village in Moscow on 15 April 2017. Fifty contestants from around Russia competed for the crown. Yana Dobrovolskaya of Tyumen crowned her successor Polina Popova of Sverdlovsk Oblast at the end of the event. The pageant was hosted by Miss Russia 2003 Victoria Lopyreva and Maxim Privalov, and featured guest performances from Elka, Stas Piekha, Nyusha, Ani Lorak, and Dmitry Malikov.

== Contestants ==
No.	Representing	Name	Age
1	Beryozovsky	Elizaveta Savicheva	20
2	Chelyabinsk	Anna Khlyzova	19
3	Tyumen	Roya Bayramova	22
4	Chita	Ekaterina Gorkovenko	22
5	Kalmykia	Dayana Kostikova	19
6	Vladivostok	Liya Selivanova	23
7	Chuvashia	Anna Antonova	19
8	Yekaterinburg	Elizaveta Anikhovskaya	19
9	Buryatia	Anastasia Danilenko	22
10	Khabarovsk	Ksenia Novachuk	22
11	Tver Oblast	Alexandra Selts	18
12	Orsk	Margarita Khokhlova	21
13	Volgodonsk	Tatyana Frolova	20
14	Novorossiysk	Viktoria Kosenko	20
15	Irkutsk	Olga Portnova	21
16	Zhukovsky	Maria Evdokimova	23
17	Tatarstan	Zulfiya Sharafeyeva	22
18	Saratov Oblast	Anastasia Ammosova	18
19	Belgorod	Maria Morozova	19
20	Udmurtia	Yulia Ermolina	21
21	Kaluga	Maria Bogomazova	21
22	Primorsky Krai	Anastasia Aleksandrova	23
23	Novosibirsk	Lydia Molodtsova	20
24	Bashkortostan	Albina Akhtyamova	22
25	Sergiyev Posad	Lina Dobrorodnova	18
26	Anapa	Anastasia Tolstaya	21
27	Sakhalin Oblast	Ksenia Azarova	23
28	Novocheboksarsk	Kristina Andreyeva	23
29	Krasnoyarsk Krai	Anastasia Yakusheva	19
30	Vologda	Elizaveta Tokareva	20
31	Simferopol	Evgenia Pokrovskaya	20
32	Yakutia	Anzhelika Nazarova	21
33	Sverdlovsk Oblast	Polina Popova	21
34	Bakhchysarai	Viktoria Zabiyako	20
35	Mozhaisk	Anastasia Gevko	21
36	Lyubertsy	Natalya Grishchenko	21
37	Novokuznetsk	Nadezhda Prokofiyeva	21
38	Ryazan	Maria Kuzina	21
39	Crimea	Evgenia Shesterikova	19
40	Syktyvkar	Lyubov Varpiotas	21
41	Kazan	Kamilya Kharisova	20
42	Moscow	Kseniya Alexandrova	22
43	Saint Petersburg	Alesya Semerenko	22
44	Belebey	Maria Mashkova	22
45	Samara	Ksenia Yashkina	20
46	Cheboksary	Anastasia Ryzhkova	20
47	Moscow Oblast	Olga Nikolayeva	18
48	Tver	Anastasia Kozlova	19
49	Tambov	Veronika Emelyanova	20
50	Veliky Novgorod	Alesya Shofman	18

== Judges ==
- Lyasan Utiasheva – Television presenter and former rhythmic gymnast
- Jonathan Becker – Photographer
- Sofia Nikitchuk – Actress and Miss Russia 2015
- Arkadiy Novikov – Restaurateur
- Oxana Fedorova – Miss Russia 2001 and Miss Universe 2002
- Ksenia Sukhinova – Miss Russia 2007 and Miss World 2008
