= Janet Kerdikoshvili =

Georgian model, singer, and beauty pageant titleholder

- Born: Janeta Kerdikoshvili; 29 November 1991 (age 34); Tbilisi, Georgia
- Height: 1.75 m (5 ft 9 in)
- Beauty pageant titleholder
- Title: Miss Georgia 2011; Miss Georgia Universe 2013; Miss Georgia Universe 2015
- Hair color: Light Brown
- Eye color: Green
- Major competitions: Miss World 2011 (Unplaced); Miss Universe 2015 (Unplaced)

Janet Kerdikoshvili (Georgian: ჟანეტ ქერდიყოშვილი; born 29 November 1991) is a Georgian model, singer, and beauty pageant titleholder. She was crowned Miss Georgia 2011 and competed at the Miss World 2011 pageant, and was later designated to represent Georgia at Miss Universe 2013, before withdrawing due to unexpected health problems. In 2015, the Miss Georgia Organization appointed her to compete at the Miss Universe 2015 pageant.

In 2013, Kerdikoshvili competed in the Russian reality singing competition Khochu v VIA Gru, which attempted to cast a revamped version of the Ukrainian girl group Nu Virgos.

== Miss Georgia Universe 2015 ==
On 16 October 2015 Kerdikoshvili was appointed to compete at the Miss Universe 2015 pageant, which took place on 20 December 2015. She was unplaced in the semi-finals.

Awards and achievements
Preceded by Eka Gurtskaia	Miss Georgia; 2011	Succeeded by Tamar Shedania
Preceded by Ana Zubashvili	Miss Georgia Universe; 2015	Succeeded by Nuka Karalashvili
