= Natalya Stroeva =

Russian beauty pageant contestant

- Наталья Строева
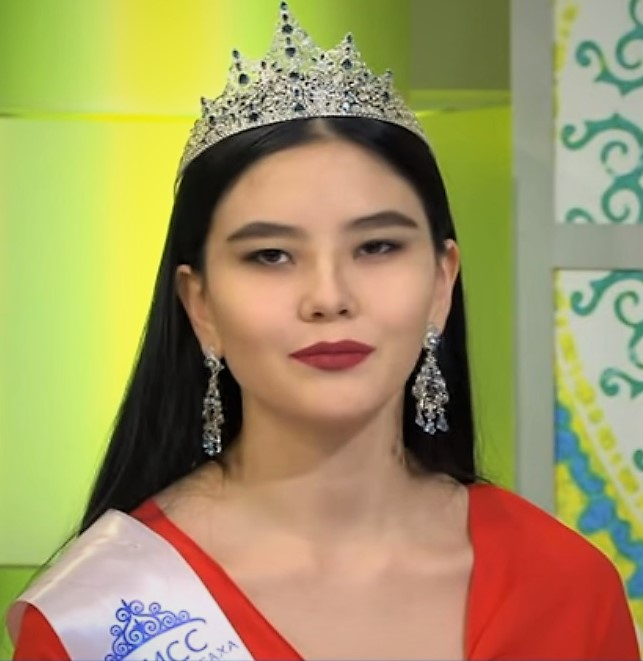
- Stroeva interviewed on Noviy Den in 2018
- Born: 20 August 1999 (age 27); Yakutsk, Russia
- Other name: Natasha Stroeva
- Education: Russian National Research Medical University
- Height: 1.73 m (5 ft 8 in)
- Beauty pageant titleholder
- Title: Miss Yakutia 2017; Miss World Russia 2018
- Hair color: Black
- Eye color: Brown
- Major competitions: Miss Russia 2018 (2nd Runner-Up); Miss World 2018 (Top 30)

Natalya "Natasha" Stroeva (Russian: Наталья "Наташа" Строева; born 20 August 1999) is a Russian model and beauty pageant titleholder who placed as the second runner-up at Miss Russia 2018, representing Yakutia. She was later appointed Miss World Russia 2018, and represented Russia at Miss World 2018.

== Early life ==
Stroeva was born in Yakutsk, Sakha Republic, and is an ethnic Yakut. She is an orphan; her mother abandoned the family shortly after Stroeva's birth, and her father died of cancer when she was 12 years old. Stroeva's older brother became her legal guardian after the death of their father. Prior to competing in Miss Russia, she resided in Moscow, where she was a student at the Russian National Research Medical University with plans to become a dermatologist after graduating.

== Pageantry ==
Stroeva began her pageantry career in January 2018 after being crowned Miss Yakutia 2017, which allowed her to compete in the Miss Russia 2018 competition. She went on to place as the second runner-up in the competition held in Moscow after qualifying to the top twenty through the fan vote, becoming the highest-placing entrant from Yakutia since Sardana Syromyatnikova placed as the second runner-up at Miss Russia 2006.

In September 2018, following the announcement of the dates of Miss Universe 2018 and Miss World 2018, it was confirmed by the Miss Russia contest management that Miss Russia 2018 winner Yulia Polyachikhina would only compete in Miss Universe, while Stroeva would represent Russia at Miss World in Sanya, China, where she made the top 30.

Awards and achievements
Preceded by Anzhelika Nazarova	Miss Yakutia; 2017	Succeeded by Vladislava Potapova
Preceded by Albina Akhtyamova	Miss Russia 2nd Runner-Up; 2018	Succeeded by Ralina Arabova
Preceded by Polina Popova	Miss World Russia; 2018	Succeeded by Alina Sanko
