= Miss World 2018 =

68th edition of the Miss World pageant

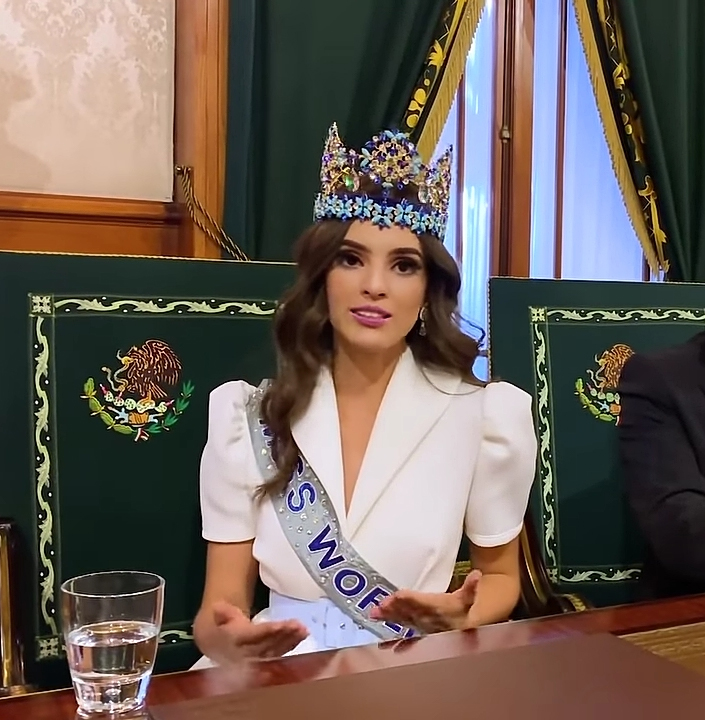
- Vanessa Ponce
- Date: 8 December 2018
- Presenters: Fernando Allende; Angela Chow; Megan Young; Stephanie Del Valle; Frankie Cena; Barney Walsh
- Entertainment: Donel Mangena; Dimash Kudaibergen; Sister Sledge
- Venue: Sanya City Arena, Sanya, China
- Broadcaster: Estrella TV; London Live; CCTV
- Entrants: 118
- Placements: 30
- Withdrawals: Cape Verde; Côte d'Ivoire; Fiji; Guinea; Israel; Liberia; Macau; Romania; Seychelles; Sweden; Tunisia; Uruguay
- Returns: Barbados; Belarus; Czech Republic; Guinea-Bissau; Haiti; Latvia; Luxembourg; Malaysia; Martinique; Puerto Rico; Sierra Leone; Uganda
- Winner: Vanessa Ponce; Mexico

Miss World 2018 was the 68th edition of the Miss World pageant, held at the Sanya City Arena in Sanya, China, on 8 December 2018.

At the end of the event, Manushi Chhillar of India crowned Vanessa Ponce of Mexico as her successor at the end of the event. It is the first victory of Mexico in the history of the pageant. Runner-Up was Nicolene Limsnukan of Thailand.

== Returns, and, withdrawals ==
This edition saw the return of Barbados, Belarus, Czech Republic, Guinea-Bissau, Haiti, Latvia, Luxembourg, Malaysia, Martinique, Puerto Rico, Sierra Leone and Uganda; Barbados, Luxembourg and Martinique in 2014 and Belarus, Czech Republic, Guinea-Bissau, Haiti, Latvia, Malaysia, Puerto Rico, Sierra Leone and Uganda in 2016.

Cape Verde, Côte d'Ivoire, Fiji, Guinea, Israel, Liberia, Macau, Romania, Seychelles, Sweden, Tunisia and Uruguay, withdrew from the competition.

== Results ==
=== Placements ===
Placement	Contestant
Miss World 2018	Mexico – Vanessa Ponce
Runner-up	Thailand – Nicolene Limsnukan
Top 5	Belarus – Maria Vasilevich; Jamaica – Kadijah Robinson; Uganda – Quiin Abenakyo
Top 12	France – Maëva Coucke; Martinique – Larissa Segarel; Mauritius – Murielle Ravina; Nepal – Shrinkhala Khatiwada; New Zealand – Jessica Tyson; Panama – Solaris Barba; Scotland – Linzi McLelland
Top 30	Bangladesh – Jannatul Ferdous; Barbados – Ashley Lashley; Belgium – Angeline Flor Pua; Chile – Anahi Hormazabal; China – Mao Peirui; Cook Islands – Reihana Koteka-Wiki; India – Anukreethy Vas; Indonesia – Alya Nurshabrina; Japan – Kanako Date; Malaysia – Larissa Ping; Nigeria – Anita Ukah; Northern Ireland – Katharine Walker; Russia – Natalya Stroeva; Singapore – Vanessa Peh Ting Ting; South Africa – Thulisa Keyi; United States – Marisa Butler; Venezuela – Veruska Ljubisavljević; Vietnam – Trần Tiểu Vy

==== Continental Queens of Beauty ====
Continent	Contestant
Africa	Uganda – Quiin Abenakyo
Americas	Panama – Solaris Barba
Asia	Thailand – Nicolene Limsnukan
Caribbean	Jamaica – Kadijah Robinson
Europe	Belarus – Maria Vasilevich
Oceania	New Zealand – Jessica Tyson

== Challenge events ==
=== Top Model ===
Miss France, Maëva Coucke won the Top Model Competition and became the first quarter-finalist of Miss World 2018.

Final result	Contestant
Winner	France – Maëva Coucke
1st runner-up	China – Peirui Mao
2nd runner-up	Senegal – Aissatou Filly
3rd runner-up	South Korea – Bo Ah Cho
4th runner-up	South Africa – Thulisa Keyi
Top 32	Australia – Taylah Cannon; Barbados – Ashley Lashley; Belarus – Maria Vasilevich; Belgium – Angeline Flor Pua; Brazil – Jéssica Carvalho; Chile – Anahi Hormazabal; Croatia – Ivana Mudnić Dujmina; Germany – Christine Keller; Greece – Maria Lepida; Guadeloupe – Morgane Thérésiné; Italy – Nunzia Amato; Japan – Kanako Date; Malaysia – Larissa Ping; Mexico – Vanessa Ponce; Nepal – Shrinkhala Khatiwada; New Zealand – Jessica Tyson; Nigeria – Anita Ukah; Panama – Solaris Barba; Philippines – Katarina Rodriguez; Poland – Agata Biernat; Russia – Natalya Stroeva; Serbia – Ivana Trišić; Spain – Amaia Izar; Sri Lanka – Nadia Gyi; Thailand – Nicolene Limsnukan; Turkey – Sevval Sahin; Vietnam – Trần Tiểu Vy

=== Talent ===
Miss Japan, Kanako Date won the Talent Competition and became the second quarter-finalist of Miss World 2018.

Final result	Contestant
Winner	Japan – Kanako Date
1st runner-up	China – Peirui Mao
2nd runner-up	Canada – Hanna Begovic
3rd runner-up	Poland – Agata Biernat
4th runner-up	Malaysia – Larissa Ping
Top 18	Bulgaria – Kalina Miteva; Cook Islands – Reihana Koteka-Wiki; Guyana – Ambika Ramraj; Haiti – Stephie Morency; India – Anukreethy Vas; Indonesia – Alya Nurshabrina; Nicaragua – Yoselin Reyes; Panama – Solaris Barba; Paraguay – Maquenna Gaiarín; Puerto Rico – Dayanara Martinez; Spain – Amaia Izar; Thailand – Nicolene Limsnukan; United States – Marisa Butler

=== Sports ===
Miss United States, Marisa Butler won the Sports Competition and became the third quarter-finalist of Miss World 2018.

Final result	Contestant
Winner	United States – Marisa Butler
1st runner-up	Bolivia – Vanessa Vargas
2nd runner-up	Netherlands – Leonie Hesselink
Team Challenge Winner	Red Team
Long jump	Bolivia – Vanessa Vargas
Athletics (60 metres)	Netherlands – Leonie Hesselink
Swimming	New Zealand – Jessica Daniel Tyson

Team	Blue Team	Red Team	Yellow Team
Top 18	New Zealand – Jessica Daniel Tyson; Northern Ireland – Katharine Walker; Panama – Solaris Barba; Scotland – Linzi McLelland; Slovenia – Lara Kalanj; United States – Marisa Butler	Belarus – Maria Vasilevich; Bolivia – Vanessa Vargas; Canada – Hanna Begovic; Cayman Islands – Kelsie Woodman Bodden; Dominican Republic – Denise Romero; Ireland – Aoife O'Sullivan	Ecuador – Nicol Ocles; Hungary – Andrea Szarvas; Kazakhstan – Ekaterina Dvoretskaya; Latvia – Daniela Gods-Romanovska; Netherlands – Leonie Hesselink; Poland – Agata Biernat
Reserve	Mexico – Vanessa Ponce; Sierra Leone – Sarah Laura Tucker	Cook Islands – Reihana Koteka-Wiki; Guinea Bissau – Rubiato Nhamajo	Finland – Jenny Lappalainen; Moldova – Tamara Zareţcaia

=== Multimedia ===
Miss Nepal, Shrinkhala Khatiwada won the Multimedia Challenge, securing her place in the finals of Miss World 2018.

Final result	Contestant
Winner	Nepal – Shrinkhala Khatiwada
1st runner-up	Mexico – Vanessa Ponce
2nd runner-up	Kenya – Finali Galaiya
Top 10	France – Maëva Coucke; India – Anukreethy Vas; Indonesia – Alya Nurshabrina; Malaysia – Larissa Ping; Mongolia – Erdenebaatar Enkhriimaa; Thailand – Nicolene Limsnukan; Venezuela – Veruska Ljubisavljević

=== Beauty With A Purpose ===
The Top 5 winners of the Beauty with a purpose Award (Miss Nepal, Indonesia, New Zealand, Mexico & Vietnam) became the quarter-finalists of Miss World 2018.
The 25 projects that were shortlisted are:

Final result	Contestant
Winner	Nepal – Shrinkhala Khatiwada
Top 5	Indonesia – Alya Nurshabrina; Mexico – Vanessa Ponce; New Zealand – Jessica Tyson; Vietnam – Trần Tiểu Vy
Top 12	Chile – Anahi Hormazabal; Jamaica – Kadijah Robinson; Kenya – Finali Galaiya; Lebanon – Mira Al Toufaily; Malaysia – Larissa Ping; Panama – Solaris Barba; Trinidad and Tobago – Ysabel Bisnath
Top 25	Barbados – Ashley Lashley; Brazil – Jéssica Carvalho; China – Peirui Mao; Cook Islands – Reihana Koteka-Wiki; Guyana – Ambika Ramraj; Italy – Nunzia Amato; Japan – Kanako Date; Mongolia – Erdenebaatar Enkhriimaa; Myanmar – Han Thi; Russia – Natalya Stroeva; Rwanda – Liliane Iradukunda; Scotland – Linzi McLelland; Singapore – Vanessa Peh

=== Global Vote ===
Final result	Contestant
Winner	Thailand – Nicolene Limsnukan
1st runner-up	Mexico – Vanessa Ponce
2nd runner-up	Uganda – Quiin Abenakyo

=== World Fashion Designer Award ===
Miss South Africa, Thulisa Keyi and Miss China, Peirui Mao emerged as the joint winners of the Designer Award.

Final result	Contestant
Winners	China – Peirui Mao; South Africa – Thulisa Keyi
Top 5	Malaysia – Larissa Ping; Portugal – Carla Rodrigues; Thailand – Nicolene Limsnukan

=== Sanya Tourism Promotional Video Award ===
Miss Kenya, Finali Galaiya won the Sanya Tourism Promotional Video award.

Final result	Contestant
Winner	Kenya – Finali Galaiya
1st runner-up	China – Peirui Mao
2nd runner-up	Nepal – Shrinkhala Khatiwada
3rd runner-up	Puerto Rico – Dayanara Martinez
4th runner-up	England – Alisha Cowie

== Contestants ==
118 contestants competed for the title:

Country/Territory	Contestant	Age (Note: Ages at the time in the pageant)	Hometown
Albania	Nikita Preka (Note: ALBANIA – Nikita Preka was appointed as "Miss World Albania 2018" by Vera Grabocka after she was reappointed the franchise holder of Miss World in Albania.)	22	Lezhë
Angola	Nelma Ferreira	20	Luanda
Argentina	Victoria Soto	25	Concepción del Uruguay
Armenia	Arena Zeynalyan	25	Yerevan
Aruba	Nurianne Arias	24	Oranjestad
Australia	Taylah Cannon	23	Melbourne
Austria	Izabela Ion (Note: AUSTRIA– Izabela Ion was awarded the title of Miss Austria 2018 after the original winner Daniela Zivkov was dethroned by Jörg Rigger, the new national director of Miss Austria pageant for violating the terms and conditions stipulated in her contract. Ion represented the federal state of Vorarlberg at Miss Austria 2018 and was crowned the 1st runner-up at the pageant.)	24	Bregenz
(The Bahamas) Bahamas	Brinique Gibson	22	New Providence
Bangladesh	Jannatul Ferdous Oishee	18	Pirojpur
Barbados	Ashley Lashley	19	Bridgetown
Belarus	Maria Vasilevich	21	Minsk
Belgium	Angeline Flor Pua	23	Antwerp
Belize	Jalyssa Arthurs (Note: BELIZE – Jalyssa Arthurs was appointed as "Miss World Belize 2018" after a closed door ceremony took place organized by Michael Arnold, the national director of Miss World in Belize.)	18	Santa Elena
Bolivia	Vanessa Vargas	22	Cochabamba
Bosnia and Herzegovina	Anđela Paleksić	20	Sarajevo
Botswana	Moitshepi Elias	24	Gaborone
Brazil	Jéssica Carvalho	22	Parnaíba
British Virgin Islands	Yadali Thomas Santos	22	Tortola
Bulgaria	Kalina Miteva	19	Sofia
Cameroon	Aimee Caroline Nseke	22	Yaoundé
Canada	Hanna Begovic	19	Toronto
Cayman Islands	Kelsie Woodman Bodden	22	Grand Cayman
Chile	Anahi Hormazabal	19	Santiago
China	Mao Peirui	26	Yinchuan
Colombia	Laura Osorio	22	Medellín
Cook Islands	Reihana Koteka-Wiki	26	Rarotonga
Croatia	Ivana Mudnić Dujmina	17	Dubrovnik
Curaçao	Nazira Colastica	18	Willemstad
Cyprus	Andriánna Fiakká	19	Nicosia
Czech Republic	Kateřina Kasanová	19	Prague
Denmark	Tara Jensen (Note: DENMARK – Tara Jensen was crowned the new Miss Denmark 2018 by Lisa Lents, the national director of Miss Denmark pageant after the original winner Louise Sander Henriksen resigned due to personal reason. Jensen was crowned the 1st runner-up at the Miss Denmark 2018 pageant.)	18	Hvidovre
Dominican Republic	Denise Romero	24	Higüey
Ecuador	Nicol Ocles	21	Pimampiro
Egypt	Mony Helal (Note: EGYPT – Mony Helal was appointed to represent Egypt by Youseff Sphai after he was reappointed the franchise holder for Miss World in Egypt.)	26	Cairo
El Salvador	Metzi Solano (Note: EL SALVADOR – Metzi Solano was appointed as "Miss World El Salvador 2018" after Carlos Jimenez acquired the Miss World franchise in El Salvador. Metsi previously was Miss Supranational El Salvador 2013 and Miss Intercontinental El Salvador 2017.)	27	Santa Ana
England	Alisha Cowie	19	Newcastle
Equatorial Guinea	Silvia Adjomo Ndong	20	Malabo
Ethiopia	Soliyana Abayneh	22	Addis Ababa
Finland	Jenny Lappalainen (Note: FINLAND – Jenny Lappalainen was appointed as Miss World Finland 2018 by the national director of Miss Suomi pageant. Lappalainen was crowned the 2nd runner-up at the Miss Suomi 2018 pageant.)	23	Helsinki
France	Maëva Coucke	24	Ferques
(Georgia (country)) Georgia	Nia Tsivtsivadze	24	Tbilisi
Germany	Christine Keller	24	Düsseldorf
Ghana	Nana Ama Benson	23	Accra
Gibraltar	Star Farrugia	22	Gibraltar
Greece	Maria Lepida	20	Patras
Guadeloupe	Morgane Thérésine	22	Le Gosier
Guam	Gianna Sgambelluri	18	Hagåtña
Guatemala	Elizabeth Gramajo	22	Guatemala City
Guinea-Bissau	Rubiato Nhamajo (Note: GUINEA-BISSAU – Rubiato Nhamajo was appointed to represent Guinea-Bissau, she was previously Miss Guinea-Bissau 2014.)	23	Bafatá
Guyana	Ambika Ramraj	19	Georgetown
Haiti	Stephie Morency	26	Port-au-Prince
Honduras	Dayana Sabillón	23	Siguatepeque
Hong Kong	Wing Wong	25	Kowloon
Hungary	Andrea Szarvas	20	Vésztő
Iceland	Erla Ólafsdóttir (Note: ICELAND – Erla Ólafsdóttir was appointed to represent Iceland by Björn Leifsson, national director of Miss World in Iceland after no national pageant was held.)	24	Reykjavík
India	Anukreethy Vas	20	Tiruchirappalli
Indonesia	Alya Nurshabrina	22	Bandung
(Republic of Ireland) Ireland	Aoife O'Sullivan	23	Bandon
Italy	Nunzia Amato	21	Naples
Jamaica	Kadijah Robinson	23	Saint Elizabeth
Japan	Kanako Date	21	Tokyo
Kazakhstan	Ekaterina Dvoretskaya	20	Atyrau
Kenya	Finali Galaiya	24	Nairobi
Laos	Kadoumphet Xaiyavong	21	Oudomxay
Latvia	Daniela Gods-Romanovska (Note: LATVIA – Daniela Gods-Romanovska was appointed to compete at the Miss World 2018 pageant by Julia Djadenko-Muggler and Kristina Djadenko, the national directors of Miss World in Latvia.)	21	Riga
Lebanon	Mira Al-Toufaily (Note: LEBANON – Mira Al-Toufaily was appointed to represent Lebanon after finishing 1st runner-up as the Miss Lebanon 2018 pageant.)	26	Beirut
Lesotho	Rethabile Thaathaa	21	Maseru
Luxembourg	Cassandra Lopes Monteiro (Note: LUXEMBOURG – Cassandra Lopes Monteiro was appointed to compete at Miss World 2018 pageant as a replacement to Kelly Nilles, Miss Luxembourg 2018 by Hervé Lancelin, the president of Miss Luxembourg pageant, because of scheduling conflicts between Miss World 2018 and Miss Luxembourg 2019 pageants. Monteiro was the 3rd runner up at the Miss Luxembourg 2018 pageant.)	18	Luxembourg City
Madagascar	Miantsa Randriambelonoro	20	Antananarivo
Malaysia	Larissa Ping	19	Lutong
Malta	Maria Ellul	24	Valletta
Martinique	Larissa Segarel	20	Fort-de-France
Mauritius	Murielle Ravina	22	Port Louis
Mexico	Vanessa Ponce	26	Mexico City
Moldova	Tamara Zareţcaia	21	Chișinău
Mongolia	Erdenebaatar Enkhriimaa	21	Ulaanbaatar
Montenegro	Natalija Glušcević	18	Podgorica
Myanmar	Han Thi	21	Yangon
Nepal	Shrinkhala Khatiwada	26	Kathmandu
Netherlands	Leonie Hesselink	26	Amsterdam
New Zealand	Jessica Tyson	25	Auckland
Nicaragua	Yoselin Gómez Reyes	23	Boaco
Nigeria	Anita Ukah	23	Owerri
Northern Ireland	Katharine Walker	23	Belfast
Norway	Madelen Michelsen	19	Oslo
Panama	Solaris Barba	19	Panama City
Paraguay	Maquenna Gaiarín	22	Asunción
Peru	Clarisse Uribe (Note: PERU – Clarisse Uribe was crowned Miss World Peru 2018 by Tito Paz, the national director of the Miss World Peru contest, after the original winner Estefany Mauricci was dismissed for not having her accredited professional degree, which is one of the prerequisites to compete in the national contest. Uribe represented the department of Chincha and was the first finalist in the contest.)	22	Chincha Alta
Philippines	Katarina Rodriguez	26	Davao City
Poland	Agata Biernat	29	Zduńska Wola
Portugal	Carla Rodrigues	25	Lisbon
Puerto Rico	Dayanara Martínez	25	Canóvanas
Russia	Natalya Stroeva (Note: RUSSIA – Natalya Stroeva was appointed as Miss World Russia 2018 by Larisa Tikhonova the national director of Miss Russia pageant after the Miss Russia Organization took a collective decision to send Yulia Polyachikhina, the original winner of Miss Russia 2018 pageant only to Miss Universe 2018 so as to avoid scheduling conflicts. Stroeva represented the Republic of Yakutia at Miss Russia 2018 and was the 2nd runner-up at the pageant.)	19	Yakutsk
Rwanda	Liliane Iradukunda	19	Western Province
Scotland	Linzi McLelland	24	East Kilbride
Senegal	Aïssatou Filly	22	Dakar
Serbia	Ivana Trišić	24	Belgrade
Sierra Leone	Sarah Laura Tucker	24	Bonthe
Singapore	Vanessa Peh	23	Singapore
Slovakia	Dominika Grecová	20	Bratislava
Slovenia	Lara Kalanj	18	Ljubljana
South Africa	Thulisa Keyi	26	East London
South Korea (Note: Competed as Korea in the pageant)	Bo Ah Cho	25	Seoul
South Sudan	Florence Thompson	19	Juba
Spain	Amaia Izar	21	Agoitz
Sri Lanka	Nadia Gyi	18	Colombo
Tanzania	Queen Elizabeth Makune	22	Dar es Salaam
Thailand	Nicolene Limsnukan	20	Bangkok
Trinidad and Tobago	Ysabel Bisnath	26	Port of Spain
Turkey	Şevval Şahin	19	Istanbul
Uganda	Quiin Abenakyo	22	Mayuge
Ukraine	Leonila Guz	19	Kherson
United States	Marisa Butler (Note: UNITED STATES – Marisa Butler was appointed to compete at Miss World 2018 pageant after a video interview selection process was organized by Michael Blakey, after he was appointed the new franchise holder for Miss World in the United States due time constraints in organizing a pageant.)	24	Standish
Venezuela	Veruska Ljubisavljević	27	Caracas
Vietnam	Trần Tiểu Vy	18	Quảng Nam
Wales	Bethany Harris	20	Newport
Zambia	Musa Kalaluka	20	Lusaka
Zimbabwe	Belinda Potts	21	Harare

== Notes ==
=== Withdrawals ===
- Cape Verde - Joyce Delgado; Did not compete for an unknown reason, will compete in 2019
- Côte d'Ivoire - Fatem Suy
- Sweden — Amanda Wiberg
- Tunisia — Haifa Ghedir
