= Miss Belarus =

Beauty contest

Miss Belarus Міс Беларусь
- Formation: 1998
- Type: Beauty pageant
- Headquarters: Minsk
- Location: Belarus
- Members: Miss Universe; Miss Global; Miss Charm
- Official language: Belarusian
- National Director: Olga Serejnikova
- Website: belarusmodels.by

Miss Belarus (Belarusian: Міс Беларусь) is a national beauty pageant in Belarus that send candidates in big four international beauty pageants.

== History ==
The Miss Belarus beauty pageant was established in 1998. Olga Serejnikova has been the director since 2003. Miss Belarus is traditionally held once every two years. The winner is expected to become a national ambassador for the country.

== Prizes ==
The Miss Belarus crown, made of white gold, contains half a thousand of cubic zirconia and topazes and weighs 120 grams. The winner also receives special prizes, including a BelGee offroader.

== International winners ==
Winners of Miss Belarus who won International pageants:

- Miss Supranational 2012 ― Katsiaryna Buraya

== Titleholders ==
Winner International Title
Miss Universe Belarus
Miss World Belarus
Miss International Belarus
Miss Global Belarus
Miss Charm Belarus

=== 1998―2006 ===
Year	Miss Belarus	Region
1998	Svetlana Kruk	Grodno
2000	Anna Stičjnskaja	Mogilev
2002	Olga Neudach	Brest
2004	Olga Antropova	Vitebsk
2006	Ekaterina Litvinova	Mogilev

=== 2008―present ===
Year	Miss Belarus	Region	1st Princess	Region	2nd Princess	Region
2008	Olga Khizhynkova	Vitebsk	Lyubov Yakovina	Minsk	Anna Shevchenko	Minsk
2010	Ljudmila Jakimovič	Grodno	Anna Kindruk	Brest	Anastasia Kharlanova	Gomel
2012	Julia Skalkovich	Brest	Viktoria Shavel	Gomel	Anastasia Pogranichnaya	Minsk
2014	Viktoria Mihanovich	Minsk	Kristina Martsinkevich	Minsk	Darya Fomina	Minsk
2016	Polina Borodacheva	Minsk	Yekaterina Savchuk	Minsk	Anastasia Soroko	Molodechno
2018	Maria Vasilevich	Minsk	Margarita Martynova	Grodno	Anastasia Lavrinchuk	Minsk
2021	Darya Hancharevich	Grodno	Julia Ivoleva	Minsk	Alexandra Popok	Minsk
2023	Eleonora Kachalovskaya	Minsk	Ksenia Vlasiuk	Brest	Milan Yakimovich	Grodno
2025	Alena Kucheruk	Vitebsk	Aliya Korotkaya	Minsk	Tatiana Marchuk	Gomel

=== Wins by region ===
Province	Titles	Years
Minsk	4	2014, 2016, 2018, 2023
Vitebsk	3	2004, 2008, 2025
Grodno	3	1998, 2010, 2021
Brest	2	2002, 2012
Mogilev	2	2000, 2006

== Titleholders under Miss Belarus and Miss Universe Belarus Org. ==
=== Miss Universe Belarus ===
- : Declared as Winner
- : Ended as runner-up or top 5/6 qualification
- : Ended as one of the finalists or semifinalists
- : Ended as special awards winner

Year	Region	Miss Universe Belarus	Belarus name	Placement at Miss Universe	Special awards	Notes
Oleg Klimov directorship — a franchise holder to Miss Universe for 2024
2026	Minsk	Aliya Korotkaya	Алия Короткая	TBA		Appointed, Aliya was a first runner-up at Miss Belarus 2025 since no national competition in 2026.
2025	Vitebsk	Alena Kucheruk	Алена Кучарук	Unplaced		
2024	Minsk	Eleonora Kachalovskaya	Элеонора Качаловская	Unplaced		Eleonora Kachalovskaya, Miss Belarus 2023 was selected by Miss Belarus Organization to represent Belarus at Miss Universe 2024 for the first time.
2024	Minsk	Karyna Kisialiova	Карина Киселёва	Did not compete		Karyna Kisialiova was actually the main representation under Miss Queen Belarus pageant but she withdrew at Miss Universe 2024.

=== Miss Global Belarus ===
- : Declared as Winner
- : Ended as runner-up or top 5/6 qualification
- : Ended as one of the finalists or semifinalists
- : Ended as special awards winner

Year	Region	Miss Global Belarus	Belarus name	Placement at Miss Global	Special awards	Notes
Olga Serejnikova directorship — a franchise holder to Miss Global from 2025
2026	Gomel	Tatiana Marchuk	Татьяна Марчук	TBA		Appointed, Tatiana was a second runner-up at Miss Belarus 2025.
2025	Grodno	Darya Hancharevich	Дарья Гончаревич	Top 12		She won Miss Belarus 2021 but she was unable to compete at Miss World 2021 in Puerto Rico. She allocated to Miss Global 2025
Appointed Belarusian representatives to Miss Global from 2017 to 2024
2024	No competition held					
2023	Did not compete					
2022	—	Maria Hodakovskaya	Марыя Хадакоўская	Unplaced		
Due to the impact of COVID-19 pandemic, no pageant in 2020–2021
2019	Did not compete					
2018	—	Hanna Maroz	Ганна Мароз	Top 20		
2017	—	Natallia Pratasevich	Наталля Пратасевіч	Unplaced		

=== Miss Charm Belarus ===
- : Declared as Winner
- : Ended as runner-up or top 5/6 qualification
- : Ended as one of the finalists or semifinalists
- : Ended as special awards winner

Year	Region	Miss Charm Belarus	Belarus name	Placement at Miss Charm	Special awards	Notes
Olga Serejnikova directorship — a franchise holder to Miss Charm from 2026
2026	Grodno	Milan Yakimovich	Миланой Якимович	TBA		Appointed, Milan was a second runner-up at Miss Belarus 2023.
Appointed Belarusian representatives to Miss Charm in 2024
2025	Did not compete					
2024	Minsk	Vitaliya Svetasheva	Віталія Светашава	Unplaced		Appointed, Vitaliya was the 1st Vice Queen Bikini of Russia 2023.

== Past license holders ==
=== Miss World Belarus ===
- : Declared as Winner
- : Ended as runner-up or top 5/6 qualification
- : Ended as one of the finalists or semifinalists
- : Ended as special awards winner

Year	Region	Miss World Belarus	Belarus name	Placement at Miss World	Special awards	Notes
Did not compete since 2025
Olga Serejnikova directorship — a franchise holder to Miss World between 2003—2023
2024	Miss World 2023 was rescheduled to 2024 due to the change of host and when entering India as the new host, there were several issues that caused the postponement until March 2024.					
2023	Minsk	Eleonora Kachalovskaya	Элеонора Качаловская	Did not compete		She allocated to Miss Universe 2024.
2022	Miss World 2021 was rescheduled to 16 March 2022 due to the COVID-19 pandemic outbreak in Puerto Rico, no edition started in 2022					
2021	Grodno	Darya Hancharevich	Дарья Гончаревич	Did not compete		She allocated to Miss Global 2025.
2020	Due to the impact of COVID-19 pandemic, no pageant in 2020. Began 2020 Belarus does not compete at Miss World until unknown years					
2019	Minsk	Anastasia Laurynchuk	Анастасія Лаўрынчук	Unplaced		Appointed, Anastasia was a second runner-up at Miss Belarus 2018 since no national competition in 2019.
2018	Minsk	Maria Vasilevich	Марыя Васільевіч	Top 5	Miss World Europe; Miss World Sport (Top 18); Miss World Top Model (Top 32)	
2017	Did not compete					
2016	Minsk	Polina Borodacheva	Паліна Барадачова	Unplaced		
2015	Did not compete					
2014	Minsk	Viktoria Mihanovich	Вікторыя Мігановіч	Unplaced		
2013	Vitebsk	Maryia Vialichka	Марыя Вялічка	Unplaced		Appointed from one of the contestants at Miss Belarus competition.
2012	Brest	Julia Skalkovich	Юлія Скалковіч	Unplaced		
2011	Gomel	Anastasiya Kharlanava	Анастасія Харланава	Unplaced		Appointed, Kharlanava was a second runner-up at Miss Belarus 2010 since no national pageant in 2011.
2010	Grodno	Lyudmila Yakimovich	Людміла Якімовіч	Unplaced		
2009	Minsk	Yulia Sindzeyeva	Юлія Сіндзеева	Unplaced		Appointed
2008	Vitebsk	Volha Khizhynkova	Вольга ХІЖЫНКОВА	Unplaved		Appointed
2007	Minsk	Alena Aladka	Алена Аляска	Unplaced		Appointed
2006	Mogilev	Ekaterina Litvinova	Кацярына Літвінава	Unplaced		
2005	Did not compete					
2004	Vitebsk	Olga Antropova	Вольга Антропава	Unplaced		
2003	Minsk	Volha Nevdakh	Вольга Неўдах	Unplaced		Appointed
Miss Belarus directorship — a franchise holder to Miss World in 2000
Did not compete between 2001—2002
2000	Grodno	Svetlana Kruk	Святлана Крук	Unplaced		
