= Skhirtladze =

Skhirtladze (Georgian: სხირტლაძე) is a Georgian surname. Notable individuals with this surname include:

- Boleslav Skhirtladze (born 1987), Georgian long jumper
- Davit Skhirtladze (born 1993), Georgian football player
- Georgi Skhirtladze (1932–2008), Georgian wrestler
- Khatuna Skhirtladze (born 1990), Georgian beauty pageant contestant
- Natia Skhirtladze (born 1990), Georgian football defender
