= Miss Russia 2015 =

23rd edition of the Miss Russia competition

- Date: April 18, 2015
- Presenters: Alexander Belov and Victoria Lopyreva
- Venue: Bravikha Luxury Village Concert Hall, Moscow, Russia
- Entrants: 50
- Placements: 20
- Winner: Sofia Nikitchuk; Yekaterinburg

Miss Russia 2015, the 23rd edition of the Miss Russia pageant, was held on April 18, 2015 at the Bravikha Luxury Village Concert Hall, where fifty contestants from different oblasts across Russia competed for the crown. The winner Sofia Nikitchuk from Yekaterinburg was crowned.

== Contestants ==
No.	Representing	Name	Age	Height
1	Amur Oblast	Maria Tuguskina	20	1.80 m (5 ft 11 in)
2	Belgorod	Darya Kuznetsova	21	1.79 m (5 ft 10 1/2 in)
3	Gorno-Altaysk	Maria Zubyuk	23	1.77 m (5 ft 9 1/2 in)
4	Murmansk	Anastasia Popova	20	1.80 m (5 ft 11 in)
5	Barnaul	Maria Zasorina	20	1.78 m (5 ft 10 in)
6	Yaroslavl	Elena Roshal	19	1.80 m (5 ft 11 in)
7	Stavropol	Viktoria Bakanova	20	1.78 m (5 ft 10 in)
8	Yakutia	Lidiya Semenova	21	1.78 m (5 ft 10 in)
9	Khanty-Mansiysk	Alexandra Maslakova	19	1.75 m (5 ft 9 in)
10	Ivanovo	Ksenia Shurakova	20	1.74 m (5 ft 8 1/2 in)
11	Saratov	Christina Odincova	19	1.74 m (5 ft 8 1/2 in)
12	Perm	Nina Yskova	20	1.76 m (5 ft 9 1/2 in)
13	Ufa	Diana Adiatullina	22	1.78 m (5 ft 10 in)
14	Samara	Yana Vasilyeva	21	1.78 m (5 ft 10 in)
15	Kirov	Ksenia Nikitenko	19	1.79 m (5 ft 10 1/2 in)
16	Saint Petersburg	Anastasia Vyacheslavova	22	1.78 m (5 ft 10 in)
17	Tyumen Oblast	Ksenia Zemlyannikova	18	1.80 m (5 ft 11 in)
18	Sochi	Oxana Stoyanovskaya	19	1.77 m (5 ft 9 1/2 in)
19	Tyumen	Darya Norkina	18	1.78 m (5 ft 10 in)
20	Simferopol	Anzhelika Pomityn	23	1.76 m (5 ft 9 1/2 in)
21	Tver	Alexandra Alexandrova	19	1.80 m (5 ft 11 in)
22	Taganrog	Lizaveta Matveeva	19	1.81 m (5 ft 11 1/2 in)
23	Novorossiysk	Tatyana Skachko	19	1.77 m (5 ft 9 1/2 in)
24	Bolshoy Kamen	Alexandra Samoylova	19	1.77 m (5 ft 9 1/2 in)
25	Volkhov	Darya Shmakova	19	1.75 m (5 ft 9 in)
26	Kalmykia	Kermen Sangadzhi-Goryaeva	21	1.73 m (5 ft 8 in)
27	Stary Oskol	Anastasia Lepikhova	21	1.75 m (5 ft 9 in)
28	Volgodonsk	Valeria Zhuravlyova	19	1.74 m (5 ft 8 1/2 in)
29	Kirovsk	Anna Kotova	18	1.74 m (5 ft 8 1/2 in)
30	Kerch	Kristina Klimenko	20	1.73 m (5 ft 8 in)
31	Voronezh	Anastasia Naydynova	20	1.75 m (5 ft 9 in)
32	Severodvinsk	Natalya Samilyk	19	1.74 m (5 ft 8 1/2 in)
33	Khabarovsk	Elena Boyko	18	1.74 m (5 ft 8 1/2 in)
34	Krasnoyarsk Krai	Darya Pyatkovskaya	21	1.76 m (5 ft 9 1/2 in)
35	Kaliningrad Oblast	Evgenia Dravina	18	1.73 m (5 ft 8 in)
36	Chita	Vladislava Evtushenko	18	1.73 m (5 ft 8 in)
37	Chelyabinsk	Ekaterina Feoktistova	19	1.74 m (5 ft 8 1/2 in)
38	Orenburg	Veronika Tyurina	18	1.73 m (5 ft 8 in)
39	Rostov-on-Don	Darya Martynenko	19	1.73 m (5 ft 8 in)
40	Kaliningrad	Yvetta Makarova	22	1.75 m (5 ft 9 in)
41	Sevastopol	Anya Shkurenkova	19	1.75 m (5 ft 9 in)
42	Yekaterinburg	Sofia Nikitchuk	21	1.77 m (5 ft 9 1/2 in)
43	Tomsk	Viktoria Rogova	21	1.77 m (5 ft 9 1/2 in)
44	Krasnodar	Violetta Igoshina	21	1.77 m (5 ft 9 1/2 in)
45	Saratov Oblast	Margarita Parkina	22	1.75 m (5 ft 9 in)
46	Kazan	Alia Zinatullina	20	1.80 m (5 ft 11 in)
47	Karelia	Evgenia Puchinskaya	20	1.76 m (5 ft 9 1/2 in)
48	Tatarstan	Viktoria Romanova	19	1.77 m (5 ft 9 1/2 in)
49	Moscow	Olya Krasikova	21	1.75 m (5 ft 9 in)
50	Novosibirsk	Evgenia Sidorova	23	1.76 m (5 ft 9 1/2 in)

== Judges ==
- Oxana Fedorova – Miss Russia 2001 and Miss Universe 2002
- Tatiana Kotova - Miss Russia 2006
- Ksenia Sukhinova – Miss Russia 2007 and Miss World 2008
- Igor Chapurin – Fashion designer
- Regina von Flemming - CEO of a publishing house
- Alexander Oleshko - Actor
