= Miss Russia 2018 =

26th edition of the Miss Russia competition

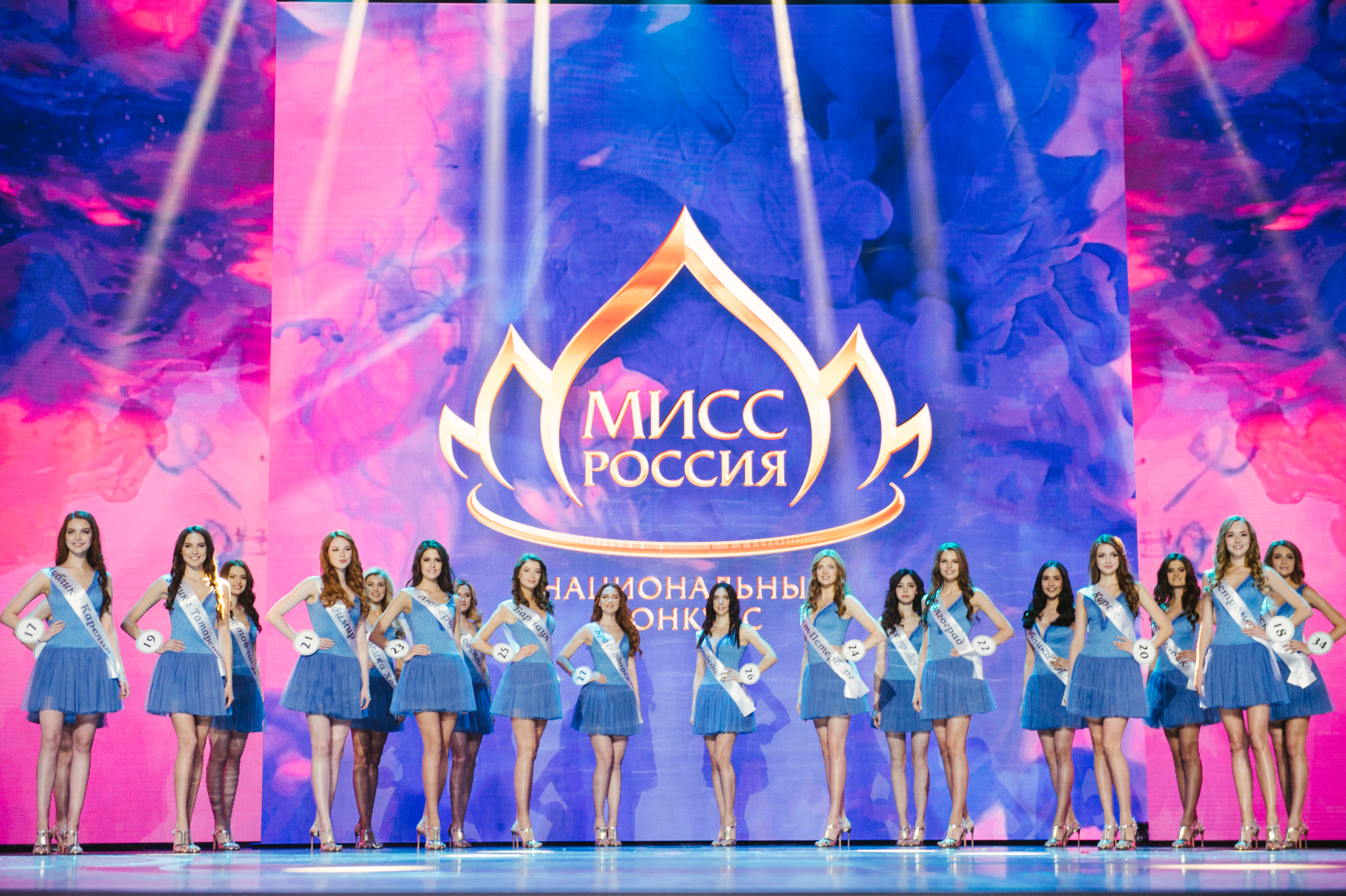
- Finalists of the competition "Miss Russia" 2018
- Date: 14 April 2018
- Presenters: Maxim Privalov; Vera Krasova
- Venue: Barvikha Luxury Village, Moscow
- Broadcaster: STS
- Entrants: 50
- Placements: 20
- Withdrawals: Anapa; Bakhchysarai; Belebey; Berezovsky; Chelyabinsk; Chita; Crimea; Kalmykia; Kazan; Khabarovsk; Moscow Oblast; Mozhaysk; Novocheboksarsk; Novokuznetsk; Novorossiysk; Orsk; Primorsky Krai; Ryazan; Sakhalin Oblast; Samara; Saratov; Sergiev Posad; Syktyvkar; Tver; Tver Oblast; Udmurtia; Velikiy Novgorod; Vladivostok; Volgodonsk; Vologda; Zhukovsky
- Returns: Alexandrov; Altai Krai; Barnaul; Belogorsk; Cherkessk; Domodedovo; Kabardino-Balkaria; Kaliningrad; Karelia; Khakassia; Kostroma; Kotlas; Krasnodar; Krasnodar Krai; Krasnogorsk; Krasnoyarsk; Kursk; Magadan; Magnitogorsk; Nizhny Novgorod; Nizhny Novgorod Oblast; Novosibirsk Oblast; Rostov-on-Don; Samara Oblast; Sevastopol; Tambov Oblast; Tuva; Vladimir; Vladimir Oblast; Volgograd; Yelets
- Winner: Yulia Polyachikhina; Chuvashia

Miss Russia 2018 the 26th edition of the Miss Russia pageant, held in concert hall Barvikha Luxury Village in Moscow on 14 April 2018. Fifty contestants from around Russia competed for the crown. Polina Popova of Sverdlovsk Oblast crowned her successor Yulia Polyachikhina of Chuvashia at the end of the event. The competition was hosted by Maxim Privalov and Vera Krasova.

Yulia Polyachikhina represented Russia at Miss Universe 2018 in Bangkok, Thailand. The second runner up, Natalya Stroeva entered Miss World 2018 in Sanya, China.

== Contestants ==
No.	Representing	Name	Age	Height
1	Chuvashia	Yulia Polyachikhina	18	1.77 m (5 ft 9 1/2 in)
2	Ekaterinburg	Anastasiya Kaunova	19	1.81 m (5 ft 11 1/2 in)
3	Irkutsk	Ekaterina Mokretsova	22	1.76 m (5 ft 9 1/2 in)
4	Kotlas	Anna Kvasnikova	22	1.75 m (5 ft 9 in)
5	Yelets	Olga Lomakina	23	1.77 m (5 ft 9 1/2 in)
6	Nizhny Novgorod Oblast	Anastasiya Shikanova	18	1.75 m (5 ft 9 in)
7	Alexandrov	Olesya Grimaylo	21	1.75 m (5 ft 9 in)
8	Tambov	Ulyana Lyakhova	21	1.76 m (5 ft 9 1/2 in)
9	Krasnoyarsk	Vladislava Bezdenezhnaya	22	1.80 m (5 ft 11 in)
10	Krasnodar	Natalya Kirichek	19	1.75 m (5 ft 9 in)
11	Magnitogorsk	Viktoria Kushik	19	1.79 m (5 ft 10 1/2 in)
12	Tuva	Norgyanma Mongush	20	1.75 m (5 ft 9 in)
13	Vladimir Oblast	Alexandra Kosogorova	19	1.75 m (5 ft 9 in)
14	Novosibirsk	Maria Stupina	20	1.82 m (5 ft 11 1/2 in)
15	Kabardino-Balkaria	Diana Nagoyeva	19	1.76 m (5 ft 9 1/2 in)
16	Krasnoyarsk Krai	Maria Emelyanenko	20	1.76 m (5 ft 9 1/2 in)
17	Karelia	Anastasiya Mikhailenko	18	1.81 m (5 ft 11 1/2 in)
18	Kostroma	Svetlana Khokhlova	22	1.77 m (5 ft 9 1/2 in)
19	Tatarstan	Kamilla Khusainova	19	1.83 m (6 ft 0 in)
20	Kursk	Arina Denisova	18	1.77 m (5 ft 9 1/2 in)
21	Vladimir	Edita Lushnikova	22	1.76 m (5 ft 9 1/2 in)
22	Volgograd	Irina Chekunova	18	1.75 m (5 ft 9 in)
23	Lyubertsy	Veronika Arsich	20	1.80 m (5 ft 11 in)
24	Saint Petersburg	Darina Abramova	19	1.77 m (5 ft 9 1/2 in)
25	Barnaul	Anastasiya Ilinykh	19	1.75 m (5 ft 9 in)
26	Domodedovo	Ekaterina Romanova	21	1.75 m (5 ft 9 in)
27	Krasnodar Krai	Angelina Likhopud	18	1.82 m (5 ft 11 1/2 in)
28	Novosibirsk Oblast	Yulia Grishmanova	19	1.75 m (5 ft 9 in)
29	Tambov Oblast	Svetlana Savelyeva	23	1.78 m (5 ft 10 in)
30	Buryatia	Yulia Olzoyeva	20	1.77 m (5 ft 9 1/2 in)
31	Khakassia	Viktoria Simakova	19	1.76 m (5 ft 9 1/2 in)
32	Krasnogorsk	Anna Kozlova	21	1.75 m (5 ft 9 in)
33	Rostov-on-Don	Arina Gladkova	18	1.76 m (5 ft 9 1/2 in)
34	Moscow	Yulia Ilina	22	1.84 m (6 ft 1/2 in)
35	Samara Oblast	Svetlana Grigoruk	21	1.76 m (5 ft 9 1/2 in)
36	Kaliningrad	Violetta Maurer	20	1.76 m (5 ft 9 1/2 in)
37	Bashkortostan	Zemfira Baydavletova	19	1.83 m (6 ft 0 in)
38	Cheboksary	Anna Shvetsova	21	1.75 m (5 ft 9 in)
39	Cherkessk	Viktoria Artemenko	22	1.76 m (5 ft 9 1/2 in)
40	Simferopol	Maria Barbakhovska	20	1.77 m (5 ft 9 1/2 in)
41	Altai Krai	Miroslava Krashina	22	1.78 m (5 ft 10 in)
42	Tyumen	Alina Kolomoytseva	19	1.75 m (5 ft 9 in)
43	Sverdlovsk Oblast	Polina Kostyuk	20	1.75 m (5 ft 9 in)
44	Yakutia	Natalya Stroeva	19	1.83 m (6 ft 0 in)
45	Kaluga	Tatiana Fitsukova	23	1.75 m (5 ft 9 in)
46	Sevastopol	Irina Shulyap	19	1.77 m (5 ft 9 1/2 in)
47	Belgorod	Violetta Tyurkina	19	1.79 m (5 ft 10 1/2 in)
48	Magadan	Anastasiya Baktimirova	23	1.77 m (5 ft 9 1/2 in)
49	Nizhny Novgorod	Maria Martyshko	20	1.76 m (5 ft 9 1/2 in)
50	Belogorsk	Anastasiya Bochkova	20	1.77 m (5 ft 9 1/2 in)

== Judges ==
- Igor Chapurin – fashion designer
- Dmitry Malikov – actor, singer, and composer
- Vladimir Matetsky – composer, producer, and radio host
- Denis Rodkin – ballet dancer at the Bolshoi Theatre
- Ksenia Sukhinova – Miss Russia 2007 and Miss World 2008
