= Miss Georgia =

Miss Georgia may refer to these national/state pageants:

- Miss Georgia (country), affiliates with Miss World and Miss Universe
- Miss Georgia (U.S. state), affiliates with Miss America
- Miss Georgia USA, affiliates with Miss USA
