= Alina Sanko =

Russian model and beauty pageant titleholder (born 1998)

- Алина Санько
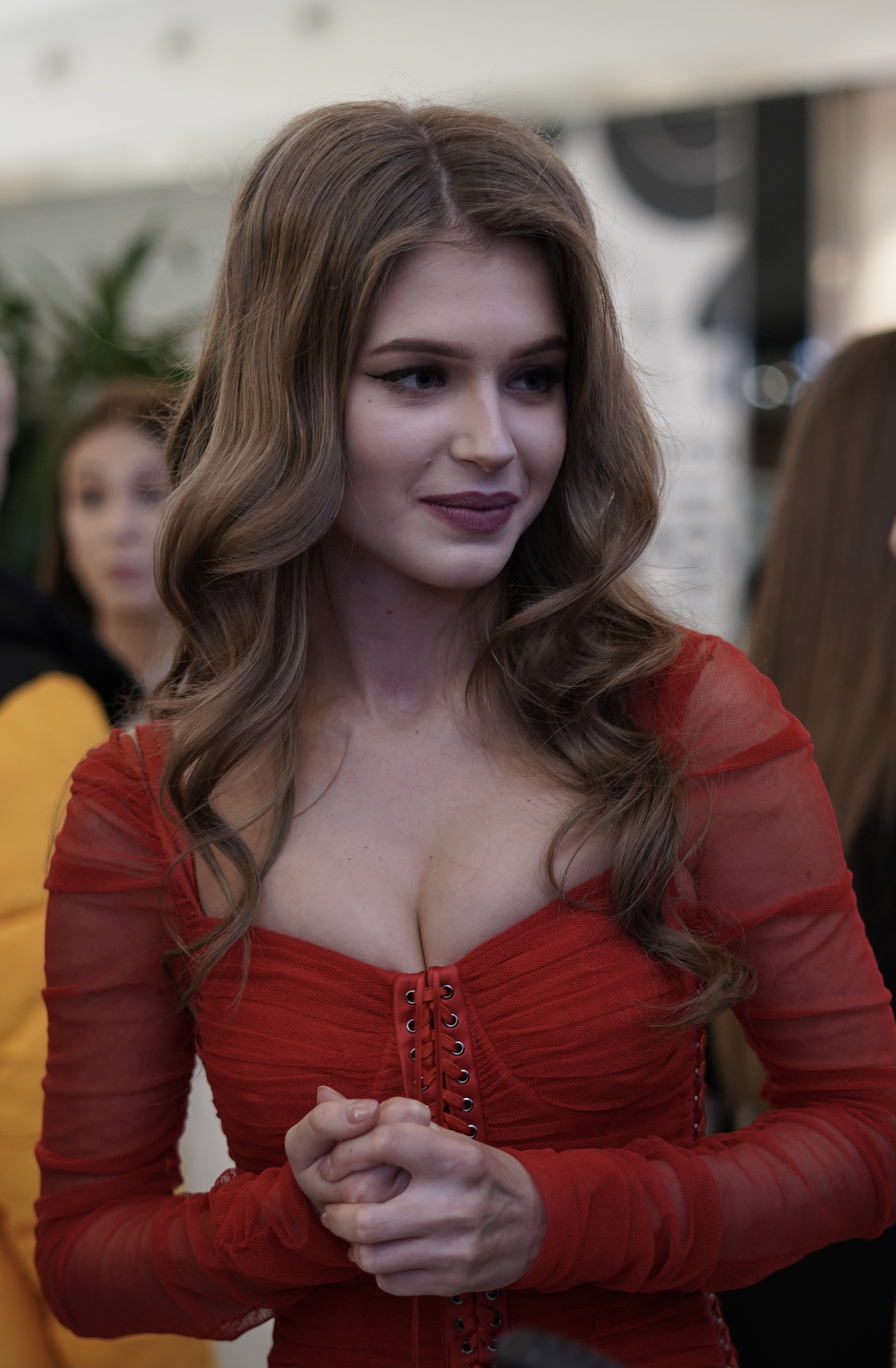
- Born: Alina Stanislavovna Sanko; Azov, Russia
- Education: State University of Land Use Planning
- Beauty pageant titleholder
- Title: Miss Russia 2019
- Major competitions: Miss Russia 2019; (Winner); Miss World 2019; (Top 12); Miss Universe 2020; (Unplaced)

Alina Stanislavovna Sanko (Russian: Алина Станиславовна Санько) is a Russian beauty pageant titleholder who was crowned Miss Russia 2019. She represented Russia at Miss World 2019, where she reached the top twelve, and at Miss Universe 2020, where she was unplaced.

== Early life and education ==
Sanko was born in Azov. Prior to winning Miss Russia 2019, Sanko resided in Moscow and studied architecture at the Moscow State University of Land Management. She had previously worked as a model for an online catalogue.

== Pageantry ==
In 2019, Sanko represented Azov and won Miss Russia 2019. She succeeded Yulia Polyachikhina of Chuvashia. The runners-up were Arina Verina of Yekaterinburg and Ralina Arabova of Tatarstan. As part of her winning prize, Sanko was awarded a brand new car and ₽3 million.

As Miss Russia, Sanko was supposed to represent Russia at both Miss World 2019 and Miss Universe 2019; however, due to conflicting dates she only competed in Miss World. Russia withdrew from Miss Universe following delays in announcing the date and venue for the competition, which would have made it difficult to find a replacement for Sanko and secure an American visa. In March 2021, it was confirmed that Sanko would represent Russia at Miss Universe 2020.

Awards and achievements
Preceded by Yulia Polyachikhina, Chuvashia	Miss Russia; 2019	Succeeded by Anna Linnikova, Orenburg
Preceded by Natalya Stroeva, Yakutia	Miss World Russia; 2019	Incumbent
Preceded by Yulia Polyachikhina, Chuvashia	Miss Universe Russia; 2020	Succeeded by Ralina Arabova, Tatarstan
