= Vladislava Evtushenko =

Russian actress

- Владислава Евтушенко
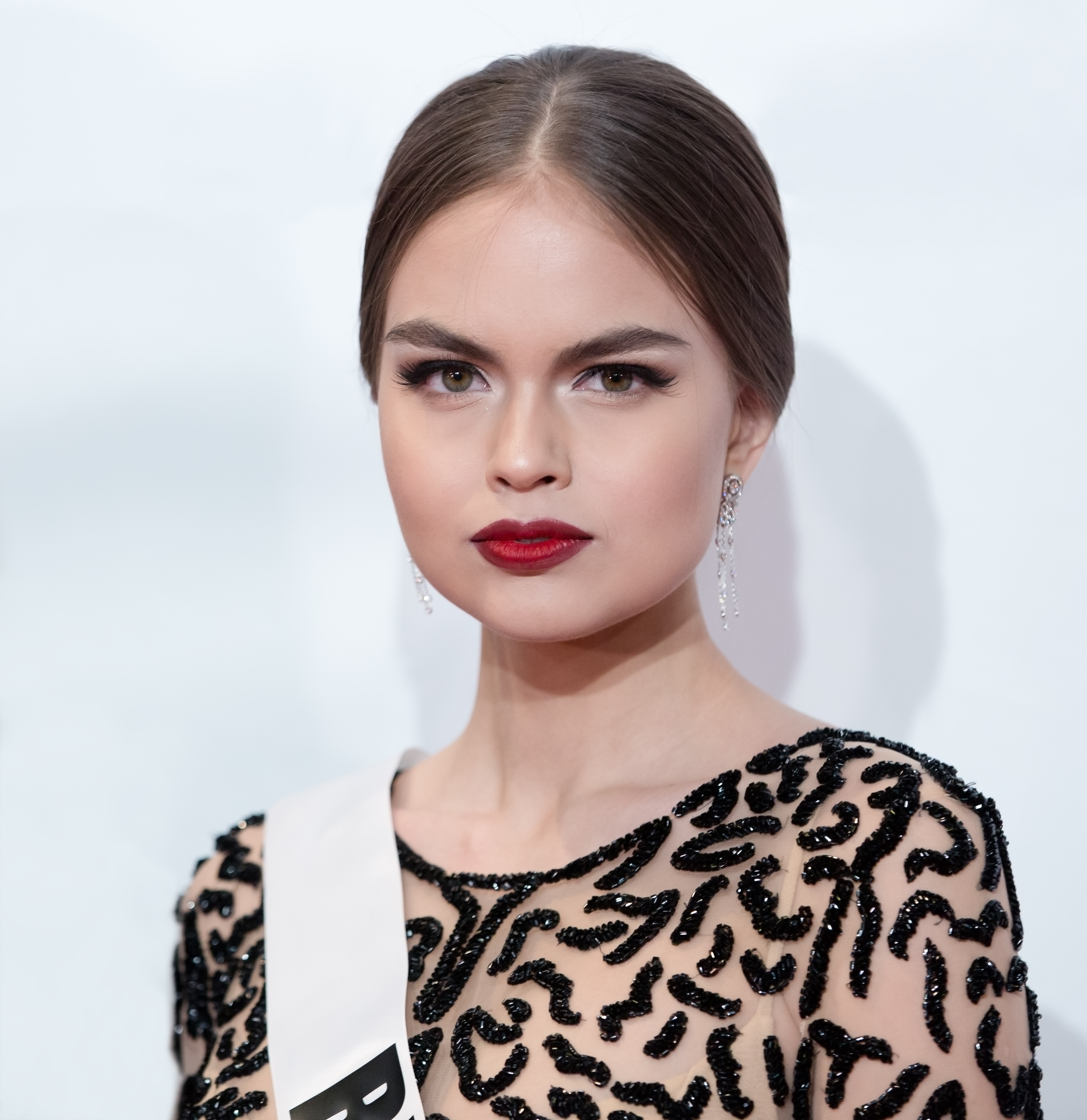
- Born: 1 May 1996 (age 30); Chita, Zabaykalsky Krai, Russia
- Height: 1.76 m (5 ft 9 in)
- Beauty pageant titleholder
- Title: Miss Universe Russia 2015
- Hair color: Brown
- Eye color: Green
- Major competitions: Miss Russia 2015 (1st Runner-up); Miss Universe 2015 (Unplaced)

Vladislava Evtushenko (Russian: Владислава Евтушенко; born May 1, 1996) is a Russian actress, dancer, model, and beauty pageant titleholder who was placed as the 1st Runner-up of Miss Russia 2015 and appointed as Miss Universe Russia 2015. She represented Russia at the Miss Universe 2015 pageant.

== Early and personal life ==
Vladislava was born on May 1, 1996, in Chita, Zabaykalsky Krai, Russia.

== Career ==
=== Miss Russia 2015 ===
Sofia Nikitchuk was crowned Miss Russia 2015. The first “Vice-Miss” was Vladislava and the second “Vice-Miss” was Anastasia Naydenova.

==== Appointment ====
Traditionally, Miss Russia sends the winner of the Miss Russia pageant to the Miss Universe pageant. In October 2015, Vladislava was appointed as Miss Universe Russia by the Miss Russia Committee. Sofia Nikitchuk was replaced by Vladislava after Miss Universe 2015 was scheduled on December 20, 2015, and Nikitchuk had to participate in Miss World, which took place on December 19, 2015.

=== Miss Universe 2015 ===
In the Miss Universe 2015 pageant, held on 20 December 2015, Evtushenko did not place as a semi-finalist.

=== Other work ===
In 2016, she starred in the music video for Russia's 2016 Eurovision entry "You Are the Only One" by Sergey Lazarev.

== Filmography ==
- The Junior Team (2017)

Awards and achievements
Preceded by Yulia Alipova	Miss Universe Russia; 2015	Succeeded by Yuliana Korolkova
