= Lika Ordzhonikidze =

Lika Ordzhonikidze (Georgian: ლიკა ორჯონიკიძე, born c. 1990) is a Georgian model and beauty pageant titleholder who placed as the 1st Runner-up in the Miss Georgia 2008 pageant, and because a Miss Georgia 2009 pageant was never held her organization decided that Lika would get the opportunity to represent her country in both Miss Universe 2009 in the Bahamas and Miss Intercontinental 2009 in Belarus.
