= Volha Khizhynkova =

Belarusian model

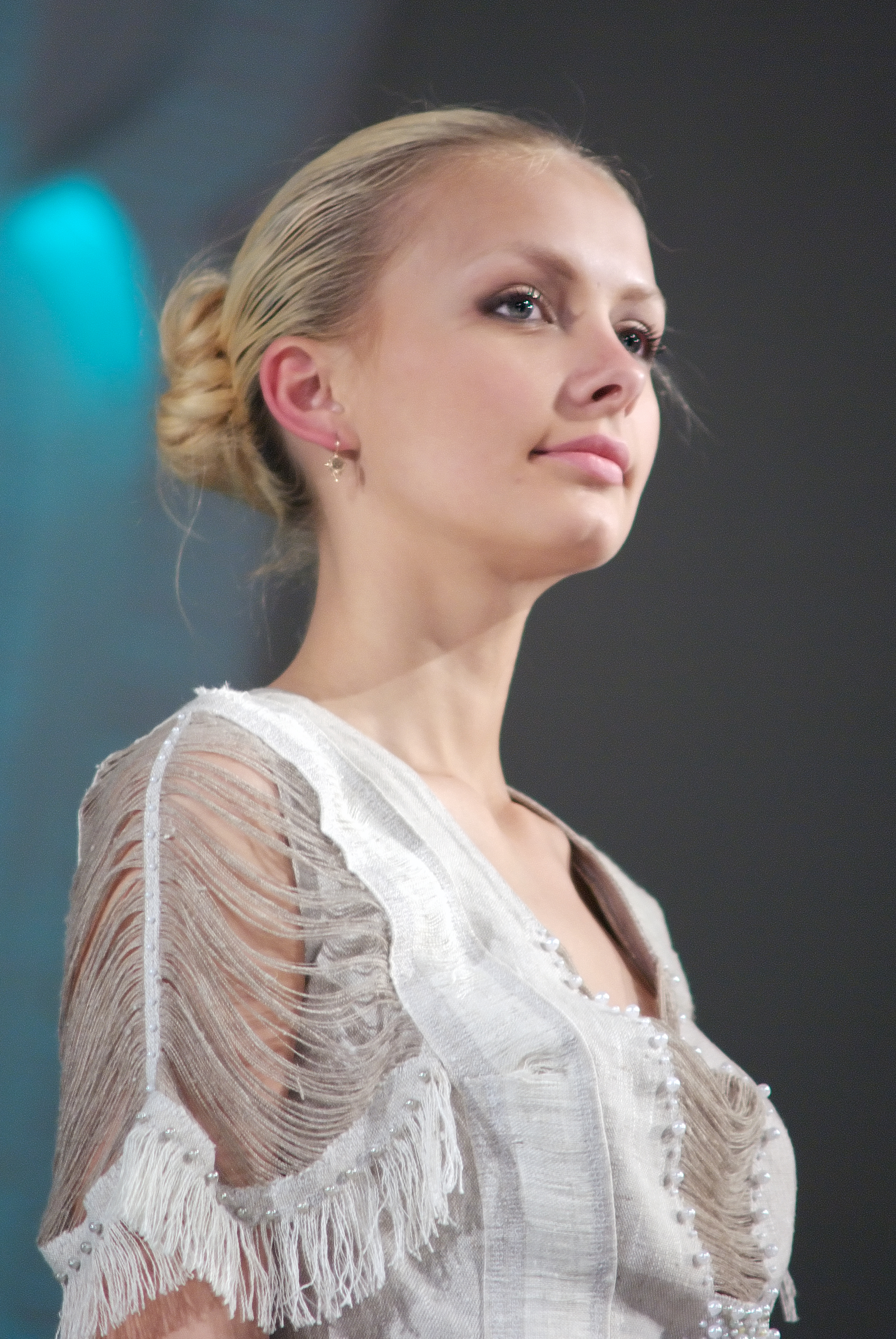
- Born: 22 November 1986 (age 39); Vitsebsk Voblast, Belarus
- Occupation: Journalist
- Height: 1.84 m (6 ft 0 in)
- Beauty pageant titleholder
- Title: Miss Belarus 2008
- Hair color: Blonde
- Eye color: Light Blue

Volha Khizhynkova is a Belarusian journalist and beauty pageant titleholder who won the title of Miss Belarus 2008 and represented Belarus in Miss World 2008 in Johannesburg, South Africa. She completed her studies and works as a model.

Khizhynkova graduated from the Institute of Journalism of the Belarusian State University with a degree in journalism. She worked on television and in the press services of the ONT TV channel and Belcoopsoyuz; she was a press secretary of the Dynamo Brest football club (2016 - 2020).

Khizhynkova became an active participant in Belarusian protests after the 2020 presidential elections; she has repeatedly spoken in favor of democratic changes in the country.

On 15 September 2020, Khizhynkova was fired from the National School of Beauty.

On 8 November 2020, Khizhynkova was detained by the police at a peaceful protest in Minsk and placed in the pre-trial Okrestina Detention Center. She was sentenced to 12 days in prison on one count and 15 days on another count by a Belarusian court for taking part in illegal demonstrations. Shortly thereafter, her sentence was increased by another 15 days after she was found guilty of participating in additional unauthorized rallies. In total, the court found her guilty on three counts of violating the Belarusian Administrative Code. She was released from detention on 21 December that same year, having served 42 days in prison.

Khizhynkova is an avid marathon runner.
