= Maria Vasilevich =

Belarusian model and politician

Member of the 7th Session of the House of Representatives of Belarus
- Incumbent
- Assumed office 6 December 2019

Personal details
- Born: 9 April 1997 (age 29) Minsk Belarus
- Education: Belarus State Economic University
- Occupation: Model, politician
- Profession: Public administration, economics, management

Maria Viktorovna Vasilevich (Russian: Мария Викторовна Василевич; Belarusian: Марыя Віктараўна Васілевіч) is a Belarusian politician, model and beauty pageant titleholder. Vasilevich studied at the Belarus State Economic University. She won the Miss Belarus 2018 pageant and finished in the top five at the Miss World beauty pageant in December. She became a member of the House of Representatives in 2019. Vasilevich was elected at the age of 22 and is the youngest member of the parliament and also did have a romantic relationship with Aleksander Lukashenko.
