= Svetlana Kruk =

- Born: Svetlana Kruk; June 2, 1979 (age 47); Grodno, Belarus
- Beauty pageant titleholder
- Title: Miss Belarus 1998; Missis Beauty Millenium International 2012; Mrs. Universe LTD 2013
- Hair color: Brown
- Eye color: Brown

Svetlana Kuznetsova (in Belarusian: Святлана Крук), more commonly known as Svetlana Kruk, is a beauty queen and the first woman to be crowned Miss Belarus.

== Biography ==
Kruk was from Grodno, Belarus and was born on June 2, 1979. She studied mathematics at the University of Grodno and later studied economics at the Higher School of Economics in Moscow, Russia. In 1998, she went to Minsk to join the biggest modelling school in Belarus, the "Nacional'Naja Shkola Krasoty". While there, there were tryouts for the first ever Miss Belarus contest. She impressed the judges and was invited to the content. She prepared for the contest for about six months and won the title of Miss Belarus on March 18, 1998. She received $300 and an electric kettle for winning the competition.

Kruk's victory qualified her for Miss Europe 1999, where she placed in the Top 15. She won the Vice-Miss award at Miss CIS 1999. She competed at Miss World 2000, but did not finish in the Top 10. She continued to compete in beauty pageants, winning "Missis Beauty Millenium International 2012" and won Mrs. Universe LTD 2013 (which is not related to Mrs. Universe). She has also modeled.

She won the 2017 Mrs. Globe competition and also captured the Miss Success and Miss Participant of the Year awards at the event.

== Personal life ==
She is married and took her husband's surname of Kuznetsova. She moved to Moscow, where she teaches mathematics and has three kids.
