= Lara Yan =

21st-century Georgian model

- Born: Larissa Petrosyan(Lara Yan); 5 April 1993 (age 33); Telavi, Georgia
- Height: 1.83 m (6 ft 0 in)
- Beauty pageant titleholder
- Title: Miss Universe Georgia 2018
- Hair color: Brown
- Eye color: Brown
- Major competitions: Miss Georgia 2017 (1st Runner-Up); Miss Universe 2018 (Unplaced)

Larissa Petrosyan (Georgian: ლარისა პეტროსიანი)(born 5 April 1993), known professionally as Lara Yan is a Georgian beauty pageant titleholder and model.

== Personal life ==
Petrosyan was born in Telavi, Georgia and is an Armenian-Georgian. She is signed to IC Model Management in Tbilisi. In December 2017, she placed as the first runner-up in Miss Georgia 2017, and represented Georgia in Miss Universe 2018.

Awards and achievements
Preceded by Marita Gogodze	Miss Universe Georgia; 2018	Succeeded by Tako Adamia
