= State University of Land Use Planning =

Agricultural school in Moscow, Russia

- Государственный университет по землеустройству
- Type: Public research university
- Established: 27 May 1779; 247 years ago
- Rector: Alexander Linnikov
- Academic staff: ≈300
- Students: ≈5 500
- Location: Moscow, Russia
- Campus: Urban
- Language: Russian
- Website: guz.ru
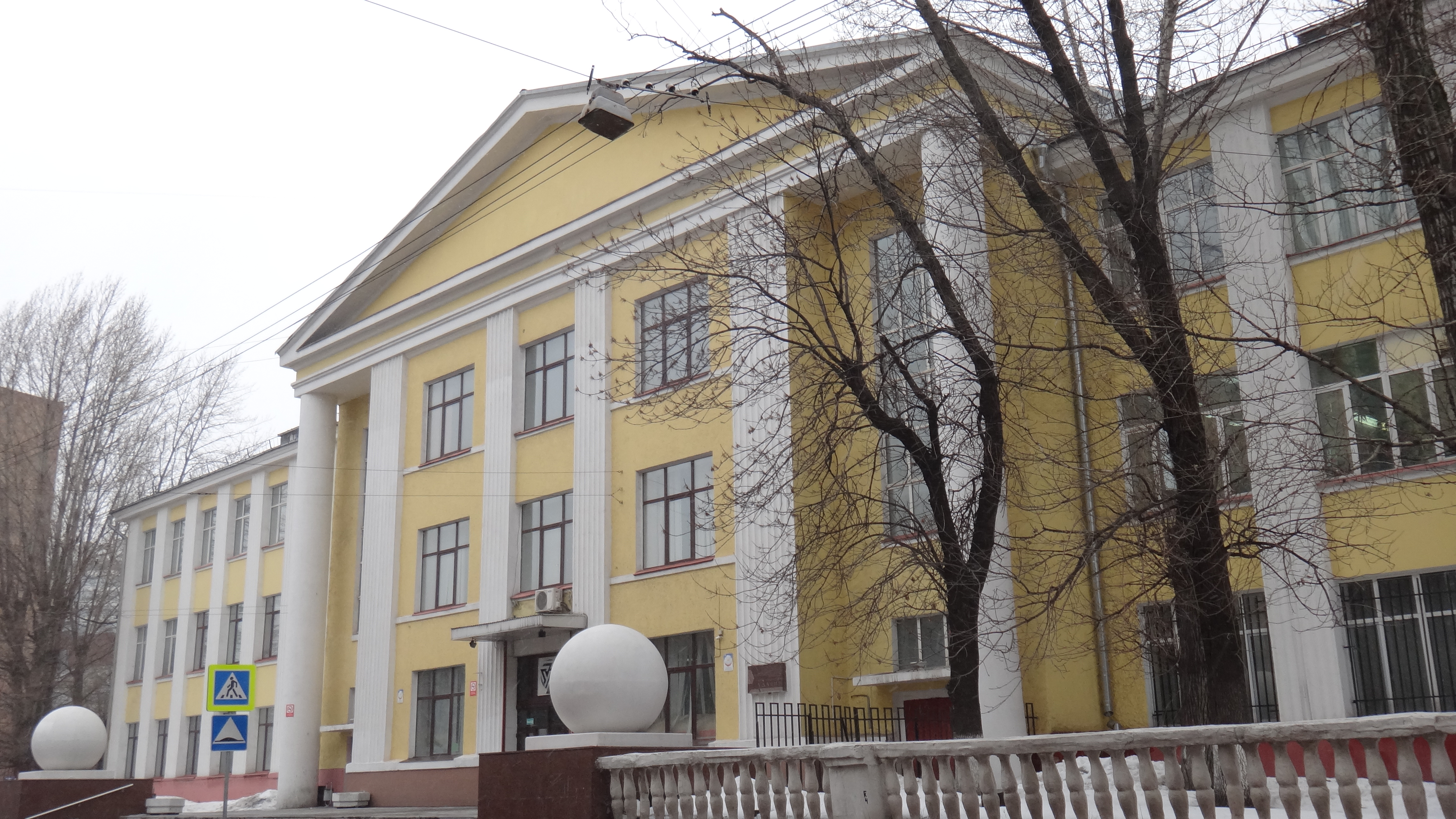

General information
- Location: 15 Kazakova str. Moscow, Russia
- Coordinates: 55.7628°N 37.6637°E

The State University of Land Use Planning (SULUP; Russian: Государственный университет по землеустройству) is a public higher education institution located in Moscow, Russia. Founded in 1779, it is one of the oldest specialized universities in the country and a leading institution in education and research in land management, cadastral sciences, geodesy, urban and regional planning, architecture, management, law, environmental engineering, and related fields. The university operates under the jurisdiction of the Ministry of Agriculture of the Russian Federation.

The university’s mission is to advance knowledge and professional practice in land use planning and spatial development, to support sustainable management of land and natural resources, and to train highly qualified specialists capable of addressing social, economic, and environmental challenges in Russia and beyond. The university library holds extensive collections of specialized literature, historical journals, and unique archival materials related to land surveying. The university is a member of major national educational authorities and is integrated into international professional associations.

== History ==
The State University of Land Use Planning traces its origins to 1779, when a land surveying school was established in Moscow by decree of Empress Catherine II to train specialists for land measurement and territorial administration in the Russian Empire. This original institution was known as the Konstantin Surveying School (1779–1818), named in honor of Grand Duke Konstantin Pavlovich. This institution became the first specialized educational establishment in Russia dedicated to the systematic training of land surveyors.

In 1835, it was elevated to a higher educational establishment and became the Konstantin Surveying Institute (1835–1916), one of the foremost institutions for training land surveyors and engineers in the Russian Empire. During the nineteenth century, the school expanded its curriculum, evolving into a higher educational establishment that combined theoretical instruction with practical training in geodesy, cartography, and land management. Graduates of the institution played an important role in the development of Russia’s land cadastre and agrarian reforms.

Following the upheavals of the early twentieth century, the institution received a new charter and was renamed the Moscow Surveying Institute (1917–1929) during and after the Russian Revolution, adapting its educational mission to the changing political and administrative context. It was integrated into the network of Soviet technical universities and continued to train specialists in land use planning, cadastral surveying, and spatial development for the national economy.

In 1930, the land surveying functions were separated and reconstituted as the Moscow Institute of Land Use Planning (1930–1944) under the jurisdiction of the Soviet agricultural commissariat. In 1945, the institute was further renamed the Moscow Institute of Land Use Planning Engineers (1945–1990), under which name it trained specialists in land management, geodesy, and related disciplines.

In the period of political reform in the late Soviet and early post-Soviet years, the institution was reconstituted as a university. In accordance with a resolution of the Council of Ministers of the RSFSR and subsequent orders, it assumed its current title, the State University of Land Use Planning (from 1992 onward), continuing its mission in education and research in land law, land management, cadastral sciences, and spatial planning.

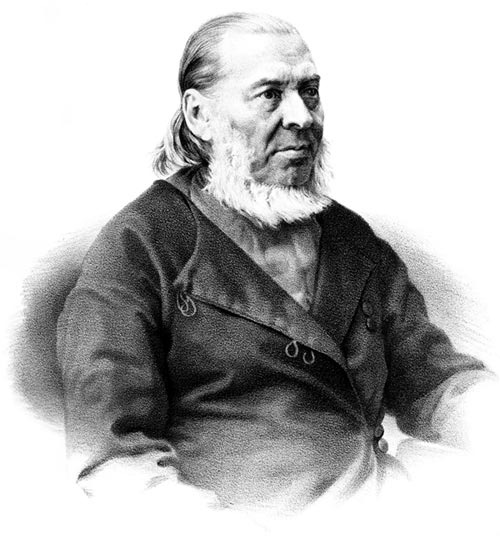
Sergey Aksakov was the first director of the surveying school

== Structure ==
The State University of Land Use Planning is organized into 7 faculties that provide undergraduate, graduate, and postgraduate education in land management, spatial development, and related disciplines:

- Faculty of Land Use and Management
- Faculty of Geomatics and Spatial Development
- Faculty of Architecture
- Faculty of Law
- Faculty of Bioeconomics and Information Technology
- Pre-University Training Faculty (provides Russian language and foundational subject training for international students)
- Institute of Part-Time Studies

== Finances ==
As a state-funded institution under the Ministry of Agriculture, the university's finances support its educational, research, and infrastructural activities. Funding sources include federal budgetary allocations, tuition fees, and grants for scientific research and innovation projects.

== Research ==
Research at the State University of Land Use Planning is focused on fundamental and applied studies in land management, spatial development, and sustainable use of natural resources. The university conducts research in close cooperation with federal and regional authorities, research institutes, and industry partners.

Key research areas include land use planning and territorial organization, cadastral systems and land registration, geodesy and geoinformation technologies, remote sensing and digital cartography, urban and regional development, real estate valuation, environmental engineering, and legal regulation of land and property relations. Special attention is given to the development of digital technologies for land administration and spatial data infrastructures.

The university supports postgraduate and doctoral research programs and operates specialized laboratories, research centers, and scientific schools. Faculty members and researchers regularly publish in Russian and international academic journals and participate in national and international conferences.

== Admissions ==
Admission for Russian students is based primarily on unified state exam (USE) results. For international students, admission involves entering exams. The Pre-University Training Faculty offers a one-year program to prepare international students for entry into Russian-taught degree programs.

== Study programs ==
SULUP offers a full educational cycle aligned with the lifelong learning concept:

- Bachelor's Degrees (4 years): Full-time, part-time, and correspondence formats in Land Management, Urban Cadastre, Real Estate Cadastre, Applied Geodesy, Architecture, Law, Ecology, Management, and Design.
- Master's Degrees (2 years): Advanced programs in Land Use Planning, Cadastral Valuation, Spatial Data Infrastructure, Land Law, Environmental Design, and more.
- Postgraduate Degrees (PhD, 3–4 years): Research-focused programs in Economics of Land Use, Land Management & Cadastre, Geodesy, Geoecology, and Public Law related to land resources.

== Student life ==
Students can maintain an active lifestyle by choosing from a wide array of sports, including badminton, basketball, volleyball, mini-football, table tennis, fitness, athletics, arm wrestling, chess, and even tug of war. For those seeking practical experience, the university's Specialized Student Teams provide invaluable hands-on training. These teams specialize in land surveying, cadastre, geodesy, and architecture —allow students to apply their academic knowledge to real-world projects.

Student organizations include a Hiking Club, Theater Studio, cybersports groups, a Volunteer Center, and historical and parliamentary clubs.

== Career prospects ==
Graduates are exceptionally sought after. They occupy key positions in:

- State Bodies: The Federal Service for State Registration, Cadastre and Cartography (Rosreestr), municipal planning committees, and the Ministry of Agriculture.
- Commercial Sector: Real estate development companies, appraisal and consulting firms, and land surveying enterprises.
- Research and Academia: Leading research institutes and universities in Russia and abroad.

Alumni are directly involved in implementing national projects related to spatial development, infrastructure, and environmental conservation.

== International Cooperation ==
SULUP maintains active international engagement as an integral part of its academic life. The university has established partnerships with approximately 50 institutions from 17 countries, spanning collaborative research, academic mobility programs, and joint educational initiatives.

The university values these relationships and approaches them with mutual respect and a commitment to long-term, meaningful cooperation. SULUP cultivates an educational environment where professional responsibility, interdisciplinary thinking, and respect for diverse perspectives form the foundation of our approach.

Since the core mission of university is to prepare highly qualified specialists capable of addressing complex challenges related to land use management, cadastre, architecture and other spheres, utilizing both theory and practical application it is considered to be essential to welcome students and scholars from around the world and sharing expertise with partners, thus contributing to the global academic community while remaining true to institutional identity and strengths.

== Rankings and Awards ==
2002 – The Honorary Corporate Diploma and the "Gold Ingot" (award of Geneva Institute of Business Management)

2003 – Honorary Diploma and the Gold Medal of Napoleon — the highest award of the Société d'Encouragement pour l'Industrie Nationale (SPI) of France.

2005 – the International Socrates Award by the General Assembly of the Europe Business Assembly

2006 – the gold medal from the Swiss School of Business and Management in the category "For Business, Prestige, and Reputation."

2019 – the 21st place in National Ranking of Green Universities

2021 – 25th place in the International Ranking of the IAAR Eurasian University Ranking (IAAR EUR)

2024 – 924th place in UI Green Metrics World University Ranking

2025:

- 43th place in Ranking of Local Universities in the Central Federal District by RAEX
- 1st place in National Ranking on Graduate Employment of Educational Organizations in the "Art and Culture" cluster
- 218-221 place in National University Ranking by Interfax

2026:

- 38th place in Ranking of Local Universities in the Central Federal District by RAEX

== Rectors ==
- 1779-1789 - Sergei Rozhnov
- 1789-1798 - Matvei Dmitriev-Mamonov
- 1798-1803 - Nikolai Maslov
- 1804-1814 - Peter Obreskov
- 1814-1818 - vacant
- 1818-1822 - Alexander Aliabev
- 1823-1833 - Bogdan Germes
- 1833-1835 - Ivan Peiker
- 1835-1839 - Sergey Aksakov
- 1839-1840 - Vasilii Lange
- 1840-1856 - Nikolai Smetskii
- 1856-1864 - Nikolai Loshkarev
- 1864-1879 - Aleksandr Apukhtin
- 1879-1887 - Evstafii Kostrov
- 1888-1897 - Mikhail Lialin
- 1897-1900 - Aleksandr Shvarts
- 1900-1912 - Vasilii Struve
- 1900-1912 - Ivan Germanov
- 1917 - Nikolai Veselovskii
- 1917-1918 - Konstantin Tsvetkov
- 1918-1919 - Nikanor Kislov
- 1919 - Mikhail Sergeev
- 1919-1921 - Feodosii Krasovskii
- 1921-1924 - Sergei Novikov
- 1924-1925 - Peter Kobozev
- 1925-1927 - Ivan Mirtov
- 1927-1928 - Martyn Latsis
- 1928-1929 - Reingold Berzin
- 1929-1930 - Nikolai Kozyrev
- 1930-1936 - Fedor Misnik
- 1936-1937 - Vladimir Sharapov
- 1937-1938 - Fedor Trudoliubov
- 1938 - Iogann Birn
- 1939-1941 - Lev Cherkasskii
- 1941-1942 - Ivan Golubev
- 1941-1943 - Aleksei Maslov
- 1942-1943 - Leontii Egorov
- 1944-1945 - Alexander Andreev
- 1945-1951 - Abram Mazmishvili
- 1951-1961 - Leonid Kostarev
- 1961-1973 - Nikolai Ilinskii
- 1973-1979 - Ivan Degtiarev
- 1980-1997 - Iurii Neumyvakin
- 1997-2021 - Sergey Volkov
- 2021-2025 - Timur Papaskiri
- 2025 - up to the present - Alexander Linnikov
