= Miss Europe 1999 =

International beauty pageant

- Date: 25 June 1999
- Presenters: Daniel McVicar
- Venue: Beirut, Lebanon
- Entrants: 39
- Placements: 15
- Debuts: Moldova
- Withdrawals: England; Israel; Luxembourg
- Returns: Albania; Austria; Denmark; Finland; Germany; Great Britain; Iceland; Ireland; Norway; Sweden; Switzerland
- Winner: Yelena Rogozhina; Russia

Miss Europe 1999, was 53rd edition of the Miss Europe pageant and 42nd under the Mondial Events Organization. It was held in Beirut, Lebanon on 25 June 1999. Yelena Rogozhina of Russia was crowned Miss Europe 1999 by outgoing titleholder Isabelle Darras of Greece.

== Results ==
=== Placements ===
Placement	Contestant
Miss Europe 1999	Russia – Yelena Rogozhina
1st Runner-Up	Italy – Cristina Cellai
2nd Runner-Up	Estonia – Kadri Väljaots
3rd Runner-Up	Finland – Minna Lehtinen
4th Runner-Up	Czech Republic – Jitka Kocurová
Top 15	Armenia – Gohar Harutyunyan (model); Belarus – Svetlana Kruk; Croatia – Tijana Safar; France – Pamela Semmache; Iceland – Katrín Rós Baldursdóttir; Slovakia – Dusana Fridrichova; Sweden – Malin Jonsson; Switzerland – Tiziana Bölsterli; Turkey – Hulya Mutlu; Ukraine – Yuliya Zharkova

=== Special awards ===
Award	Contestant
Miss Elegance	Italy – Cristina Cellai
Miss Friendship	Switzerland – Tiziana Bölsterli
Miss Photogenic	Finland – Minna Lehtinen
Miss Talent	Armenia – Gohar Harutyunyan (model)

== "Comité Officiel et International Miss Europe" Competition ==
Miss Europa 1999
- Date: 8 September 1999
- Venue: Taormina Greek Theatre, Taormina, Sicily, Italy
- Entrants: 34
- Placements: 2
- Debuts: Latvia
- Withdrawals: Andorra, Belgium, Croatia, Cyprus, Denmark, France, Greece, Holland, Ireland, Italy, Israel, Luxembourg, Macedonia FYRO, Moldova, Monaco, New Caledonia (French Territory), Norway, Poland, Russia, Scandinavia, Scotland, Switzerland, Turkey, Turkish Republic of Northern Cyprus, United Kingdom & Wales
- Returns: England, Germany, Hungary & Malta
- Winner: Anna Maria Tudorache; Romania

From 1951 to 2002 there was a rival Miss Europe competition organized by the "Comité Officiel et International Miss Europe". This was founded in 1950 by Jean Raibaut in Paris, the headquarters later moved to Marseille. The winners wore different titles like Miss Europe, Miss Europa or Miss Europe International.

This year's competition took place at the Taormina Greek Theatre in Taormina, Sicily, Italy. There were 34 contestants from 12 countries. At the end, Anna Maria Tudorache of Romania was crowned as Miss Europa 1999. Tudorache succeeded her predecessor Mimmi Gunnarsson of Sweden.

=== Placements ===
Placement	Contestant
Miss Europa 1999	Romania – Anna Maria Tudorache
1st Runner-Up	Spain – Eva Maria Blanco Games

=== Contestants ===
- Albania – Aldona Elezi
- Bulgaria – Ana Maria Oproiu
- Bulgaria – Cristina Stan
- England – Angela Lynn Smedley
- England – Danielle Wall
- England – Katie Vigers
- England – Kishmiro Dickinson
- England – Zara Baynes
- Finland – Anu Pekkarinen
- Finland – Jenni Ahola
- Finland – Linda Kvalvaag
- Germany – Jessica Stahl
- Hungary – Lilla Hartai
- Hungary – Szilvia Booli
- Latvia – Iveta Vanaga
- Malta – Citianne Balzan
- Romania – Alina Tautan
- Romania – Anna Maria Tudorache
- Romania – Simona Verestiuc
- Spain – Eva Maria Blanco Games
- Sweden – Nadine Callus
- Ukraine – Galina Lakhtina
