= Miss Russia 2016 =

24th edition of the Miss Russia competition

- Date: 16 April 2016
- Presenters: Maxim Privalov, Glukoza
- Entertainment: DJ Leonid Rudenko, Glukoza, Mayakovsky, Tatiana Kotova, Alexey Vorobyov, Nikolay Baskov, Mikhail Smirnov, Veronika Ustimova
- Venue: Barvikha Luxury Village, Moscow
- Broadcaster: STS
- Entrants: 50
- Placements: 20
- Winner: Yana Dobrovolskaya; Tyumen

Miss Russia 2016 the 24th edition of the Miss Russia pageant, was held in concert hall Barvikha Luxury Village in Moscow on 16 April 2016. Fifty contestants from around Russia competed for the crown. Sofia Nikitchuk of Yekaterinburg crowned her successor, Yana Dobrovolskaya of Tyumen at the end of the event.

== Contestants ==
No.	Representing	Name	Age	Height	Hometown
1	Angarsk	Kristina Koroleva	20	1.76 m (5 ft 9 1/2 in)	Angarsk
2	Krasnodar Krai	Maria Antonets	18	1.76 m (5 ft 9 1/2 in)	Moscow
3	Anapa	Elizaveta Goryunova	20	1.76 m (5 ft 9 1/2 in)	Anapa
4	Khimki	Regina Skoroletova	20	1.76 m (5 ft 9 1/2 in)	Khimki
5	Orsk	Inna Bychkova	19	1.76 m (5 ft 9 1/2 in)	Orsk
6	Simferopol	Anastasia Samkova	18	1.74 m (5 ft 8 1/2 in)	Simferopol
7	Tatarstan	Dilyara Yalaltynova	18	1.75 m (5 ft 9 in)	Moscow
8	Yekaterinburg	Anastasia Voynova	21	1.75 m (5 ft 9 in)	Yekaterinburg
9	Kabardino-Balkaria	Nazima Goova	18	1.77 m (5 ft 9 1/2 in)	Nalchik
10	Udmurtia	Polina Tensina	18	1.75 m (5 ft 9 in)	Izhevsk
11	Ulyanovsk	Talia Aybedullina	19	1.75 m (5 ft 9 in)	Ulyanovsk
12	Orenburg Oblast	Yuliana Korolkova	21	1.75 m (5 ft 9 in)	Orsk
13	Kaliningrad	Anastasia Khizhnyak	19	1.75 m (5 ft 9 in)	Kaliningrad
14	Noyabrsk	Valeria Shakhovtseva	19	1.75 m (5 ft 9 in)	Noyabrsk
15	Irkutsk Oblast	Daria Pershina	20	1.75 m (5 ft 9 in)	Moscow
16	Ivanovo	Valeria Kashintseva	20	1.73 m (5 ft 8 in)	Ivanovo
17	Krasnodar	Anna Dmitrenko	20	1.74 m (5 ft 8 1/2 in)	Krasnodar
18	Sayansk	Anastasia Simbirtseva	22	1.74 m (5 ft 8 1/2 in)	Sayansk
19	Oryol	Ekaterina Tsybrina	19	1.74 m (5 ft 8 1/2 in)	Oryol
20	Tyumen	Yana Dobrovolskaya	18	1.74 m (5 ft 8 1/2 in)	Tyumen
21	Novokuznetsk	Vladislava Kruzhkova	18	1.73 m (5 ft 8 in)	Novokuznetsk
22	Dagestan	Albina Ildarova	21	1.73 m (5 ft 8 in)	Moscow
23	Usolye-Sibirskoye	Maria Kolesnik	21	1.73 m (5 ft 8 in)	Usolye Sibirskoye
24	Sochi	Valentina Bardina	20	1.73 m (5 ft 8 in)	Sochi
25	Yalta	Ekaterina Luganskaya	18	1.73 m (5 ft 8 in)	Yalta
26	Sevastopol	Marina Solodova	19	1.73 m (5 ft 8 in)	Sevastopol
27	Tomsk	Anastasia Kalinina	19	1.73 m (5 ft 8 in)	Tomsk
28	Irkutsk	Irina Zhdanova	19	1.73 m (5 ft 8 in)	Irkutsk
29	Chelyabinsk	Evgeniya Nikolayevskaya	19	1.73 m (5 ft 8 in)	Chelyabinsk
30	Karelia	Tatiana Kizimova	22	1.73 m (5 ft 8 in)	Moscow
31	Sverdlovsk Oblast	Elena Belkova	22	1.75 m (5 ft 9 in)	Moscow
32	Petrozavodsk	Ekaterina Dorozhko	18	1.73 m (5 ft 8 in)	Petrozavodsk
33	Yaroslavl	Anastasia Polkhova	23	1.73 m (5 ft 8 in)	Yaroslavl
34	Saint Petersburg	Yulia Belyakova	22	1.73 m (5 ft 8 in)	Saint Petersburg
35	Buryatia	Anna Serebrennikova	23	1.75 m (5 ft 9 in)	Ulan-Ude
36	Volgograd	Angelina Samokhina	18	1.75 m (5 ft 9 in)	Volgograd
37	Bashkortostan	Gulnur Zinnatova	23	1.76 m (5 ft 9 1/2 in)	Moscow
38	Sergiyev Posad	Daria Kurdyukova	18	1.78 m (5 ft 10 in)	Sergiyev Posad
39	North Ossetia-Alania	Ekaterina Khachirova	21	1.76 m (5 ft 9 1/2 in)	Moscow
40	Moscow	Valeria Deryagina	19	1.76 m (5 ft 9 1/2 in)	Moscow
41	Belgorod	Galina Solovyeva	20	1.77 m (5 ft 9 1/2 in)	Belgorod
42	Yakutia	Alexandra Pavlova	18	1.78 m (5 ft 10 in)	Moscow
43	Kirov	Yulia Khoroshavina	21	1.79 m (5 ft 10 1/2 in)	Kirov
44	Rostov-on-Don	Alina Goncharova	22	1.86 m (6 ft 1 in)	Rostov-on-Don
45	Kazan	Sofia Mustafina	21	1.79 m (5 ft 10 1/2 in)	Kazan
46	Chita	Violetta Petrovskaya	20	1.78 m (5 ft 10 in)	Chita
47	Tuapse	Alina Toroshchina	20	1.79 m (5 ft 10 1/2 in)	Tuapse
48	Murmansk	Elizaveta Gold	20	1.77 m (5 ft 9 1/2 in)	Murmansk
49	Krasnogorsk	Anna Sarycheva	20	1.79 m (5 ft 10 1/2 in)	Krasnogorsk
50	Krasnokamensk	Anastasia Lyakhova	21	1.80 m (5 ft 11 in)	Krasnokamensk
