= Yuliana Korolkova =

Russian model

- Юлиана Королькова
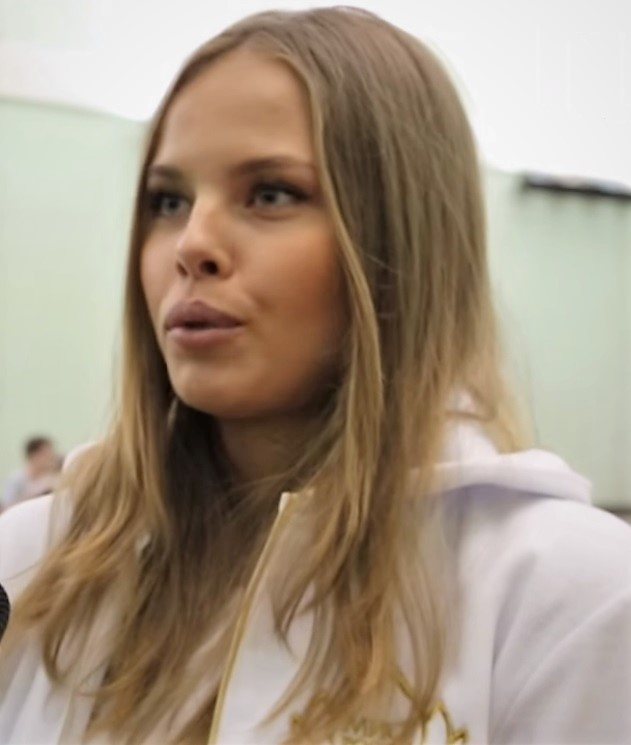
- Korolkova interviewed on Russia Beyond in 2016
- Born: September 9, 1994 (age 32); Orsk, Orenburg Oblast, Russia
- Height: 5 ft 8 in (173 cm)
- Beauty pageant titleholder
- Title: Miss Universe Russia 2016
- Hair color: Dark Blonde
- Eye color: Green
- Major competitions: Miss Russia 2016 (1st Runner-up); Miss Universe 2016 (Unplaced)

Yuliana Korolkova (Russian: Юлиана Королькова; born 9 September 1994) is a Russian model and beauty pageant titleholder. She was first runner-up at the Miss Russia 2016 pageant and later represented Russia at the Miss Universe 2016.

== Early life ==
Korolkova was born and raised in Orsk in Orenburg Oblast.

== Pageantry ==
Korolkova began her pageantry career representing Orenburg in the Miss Russia 2016 competition. She was declared first runner-up and would compete at the Miss Universe 2016 pageant which is slated to be held on 30 January 2017. Yana represented Russia at the Miss World 2016 pageant scheduled to be held on 18 December 2016. She did not placed in the Top 13.

Awards and achievements
Preceded by Vladislava Evtushenko	Miss Russia 1st Runner-up; 2016	Succeeded by Kseniya Alexandrova
Preceded by Vladislava Evtushenko	Miss Universe Russia; 2016	Succeeded by Kseniya Alexandrova
