= Kseniya Alexandrova =

Russian model, television host and beauty pageant titleholder (1994–2025)

- Ксения Александрова
- Born: 12 November 1994; Moscow, Russia
- Died: 12 August 2025 (aged 30); Moscow, Russia
- Occupations: Model; host; psychologist; beauty pageant titleholder
- Height: 5 ft 10 in (178 cm)
- Beauty pageant titleholder
- Title: Miss Universe Russia 2017
- Hair color: Brown
- Eye color: Brown
- Major competitions: Miss Russia 2017 (1st Runner-Up); Miss Universe 2017 (Unplaced)

Kseniya Sergeyevna Alexandrova (Russian: Ксения Сергеевна Александрова, 12 November 1994 – 12 August 2025) was a Russian model, television host, psychologist and beauty pageant titleholder. She was first runner-up at the Miss Russia 2017 pageant and later represented Russia at the Miss Universe 2017 pageant.

== Early life and career ==
Alexandrova was born and raised in Moscow. Kseniya was a model with Modus Vivendis agency from the age of 19. She spoke fluent Russian only.

In 2016, she graduated from Plekhanov Russian University of Economics, where she earned a degree in Finance and Credit.

In 2020, she completed her studies at the High School of Cinema and Television "Ostankino".

In 2022, she graduated from Moscow Pedagogical State University with a degree in Psychology.

Kseniya was a psychologist and psychodrama therapist.

== Pageantry ==
=== Miss Russia 2017 ===
Alexandrova represented Moscow in the Miss Russia 2017 competition, and placed as first runner-up. She succeeded outgoing Miss Russia 2016 1st Runner-up and Miss Universe Russia 2016 Yuliana Korolkova.

=== Miss Universe 2017 ===
Alexandrova represented Russia at the Miss Universe 2017 competition, but did not place in the Top 16 semifinalists. The pageant was won by Demi-Leigh Nel-Peters of South Africa.

== Death ==
In July 2025, she was involved in a car collision in Tver Oblast. An elk ran onto the road and crashed through the car windshield. Alexandrova was in the passenger seat and suffered a head injury. She was hospitalized in the intensive care unit of the Sklifosovsky Institute for Emergency Medicine, but died on 12 August, at the age of 30.

Awards and achievements
Preceded by Yuliana Korolkova	Miss Russia 1st Runner-up; 2017	Succeeded by Violetta Tyukina
Preceded by Yuliana Korolkova	Miss Universe Russia; 2017	Succeeded by Yulia Polyachikhina
