= Miss Russia 2019 =

27th edition of the Miss Russia competition

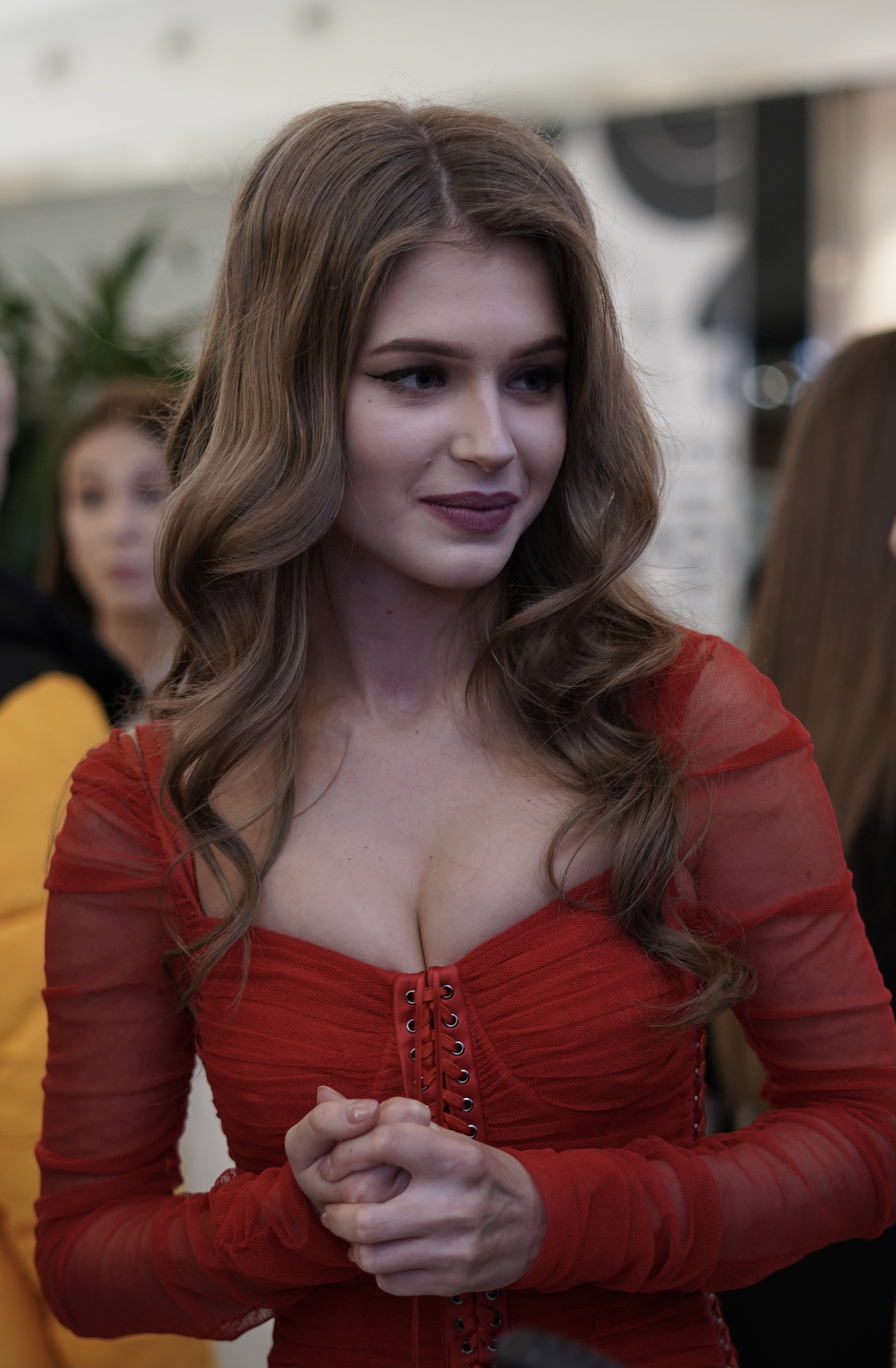
- Alina Sanko, Miss Russia 2019
- Date: 13 April 2019
- Presenters: Maxim Privalov; Ksenia Sukhinova
- Entertainment: Thomas Grazioso; Sergey Lazarev
- Venue: Barvikha Luxury Village, Moscow
- Broadcaster: STS
- Entrants: 50
- Placements: 20
- Winner: Alina Sanko; Azov

Miss Russia 2019 the 27th edition of the Miss Russia pageant, held in concert hall Barvikha Luxury Village in Moscow on 13 April 2019. Fifty contestants from across Russia competed for the crown. The competition was hosted by Maxim Privalov and Ksenia Sukhinova. Yulia Polyachikhina of Chuvashia crowned her successor Alina Sanko of Azov at the end of the event. Sanko represented Russia at the Miss World 2019 pageant where she placed Top 12, and also represented Russia at Miss Universe 2020 pageant, where she unplaced. The second runner up, Ralina Arabova entered Miss Universe 2021 in Eilat, Israel.

== Contestants ==
No.	Representing	Name	Age
1	Penza	Olga Bezrukova	20
2	Bashkortostan	Elvira Karamysheva	20
3	Yekaterinburg	Arina Verina	21
4	Volgograd	Violetta Milovanova	19
5	Tolyatti	Ksenia Belova	18
6	Belgorod	Natalya Vorobyova	23
7	Kerch	Alina Vitkovskaya	19
8	Tobolsk	Elena Panovikova	23
9	Nizhny Novgorod	Daria Melnikova	22
10	Khabarovsk	Anastasia Krivolapova	22
11	Tver	Tatiana Pachisko	21
12	Tyumen	Kristina Barinova	20
13	Anapa	Anastasia Dyadyura	19
14	Kazan	Milyausha Galimova	20
15	Tver Oblast	Elizaveta Stratenko	22
16	Saint Petersburg	Elena Linkevich	19
17	Nizhny Novgorod Oblast	Yana Patsenker	22
18	Kirov	Maria Kudryavtseva	22
19	Mari El	Anna Rudakova	19
20	Sochi	Kristina Rebrik	19
21	Stavropol Krai	Valeria Skolota	20
22	Tatarstan	Ralina Arabova	19
23	Perm Krai	Ekaterina Neklyudova	21
24	Chelyabinsk	Elizaveta Smolina	23
25	Samara Oblast	Daria Mitichkina	18
26	Barnaul	Lidia Ivanova	19
27	Ufa	Linara Isayeva	18
28	Leningrad Oblast	Ekaterina Kalyazina	22
29	Yakutia	Vlada Potapova	23
30	Simferopol	Yulia Chernyuk	22
31	Rostov-on-Don	Elena Razinkova	20
32	Azov	Alina Sanko	20
33	Moscow	Ekaterina Nenasheva	18
34	Tyumen Oblast	Polina Kachanova	20
35	Sevastopol	Anastasia Voznyuk	20
36	Buryatia	Namzhilma Dorzhiyeva	21
37	Chuvashia	Yulia Tikhonova	20
38	Noyabrsk	Daria Verkhoturtseva	21
39	Kaluga Oblast	Sabina Rabaya	23
40	Ivanovo Oblast	Maria Kalibina	20
41	Anadyr	Anastasia Konareva	19
42	Samara	Anna Kharisova	19
43	Moscow Oblast	Viktoria Guseva	23
44	Volgograd Oblast	Marina Grosheva	22
45	Ivanovo	Alexandra Yelicheva	18
46	Novokuznetsk	Lolita Prudnikova	19
47	Sverdlovsk Oblast	Vlada Sadirova	22
48	Krasnodar	Elizaveta Zadorozhnaya	19
49	Novosibirsk	Polina Atamanova	18
50	Bogorodsk	Veronika Shchelkanova	22

== Jury ==
- Igor Chapurin – fashion designer
- Oxana Fedorova – television presenter, Miss Russia 2001
- Tatiana Kotova – singer and Miss Russia 2006
- Vladimir Matetsky – composer, producer, and radio presenter
- DJ Smash – DJ and music producer
