= Nia Tsivtsivadze =

Georgian model (born 1994)

- Born: 1 September 1994 (age 32); Tbilisi, Georgia
- Height: 1.80 m (5 ft 11 in)
- Beauty pageant titleholder
- Title: Miss Georgia 2017
- Hair color: Blonde
- Eye color: Blue
- Major competitions: Miss Georgia 2017 (Winner); Miss World 2018 (Unplaced)

Nia Tsivtsivadze (Georgian: ნია წივწივაძე; born 1 September 1994) is a Georgian model and beauty pageant titleholder who was crowned Miss Georgia 2017. She represented Georgia in the Miss World 2018 competition.

Awards and achievements
Preceded by Nuka Karalashvili	Miss Georgia; 2017	Succeeded by Nini Gogichaishvili
