= Miss Georgia (country) =

Beauty pageant

Miss Georgia მის საქართველო Mis Sakartvelo
- Formation: 2003; 23 years ago
- Type: Beauty pageant
- Headquarters: Tbilisi
- Location: Georgia
- Members: Miss Universe; Miss World; Miss Intercontinental; Miss Tourism International
- Official language: Georgian
- Organizer: IC Model Management
- Website: missgeorgia.ge

Miss Georgia (Georgian: მის საქართველო, romanized: mis sakartvelo) is a national beauty pageant in Georgia.

== History ==
The Miss Georgia beauty contest is the biggest national pageant in Georgia since 2003. Since that year the pageant's winner competes at the Miss World competition where London becomes a home of the pageant. Miss Georgia and IC Model Management together develop its pageant to bring the country on International stage. In 2004 Georgia started to participate at the Miss Universe International beauty contest in Ecuador by Nino Murtazashvili of Tbilisi. Usually the main winner goes to Miss World while second title went to Miss Universe as Miss Universe Georgia.

== Titleholders ==
Year	Miss Georgia	Georgian Name	Miss Georgia Universe	Georgian Name	Miss Georgia World	Georgian Name
2003	Irina Onashvili	ირინა ონაშვილი	Nino Murtazashvili (Note: Murtazashvili was originally selected to represent Georgia in Miss Universe 2003, but the Miss Georgia Organization later pulled her out of the competition and selected her to represent Georgia in Miss Universe 2004 instead.)	ნინო მურთაზაშვილი	Irina Onashvili	ირინა ონაშვილი
2004	Salome Chikviladze	სალომე ჩიკვილაძე	Nino Murtazashvili	ნინო მურთაზაშვილი	Salome Chikviladze	სალომე ჩიკვილაძე
2005	Salome Khelashvili	სალომე ხელაშვილი	Rusudan Bochoidze	რუსუდან ბოჩოიძე	Salome Khelashvili	სალომე ხელაშვილი
2006	Nino Kalandadze	ნინო კალანდაძე	Ekaterine Buadze	ეკატერინე ბუაძე	Nino Kalandadze	ნინო კალანდაძე
2007	Nino Likuchova	ნინო ლიკუჩოვ	Ana Giorgelashvili	ანა გიორგელაშვილი	Tamar Nemsitsveridze	თამარ ნემსიწვერიძე
2007	Tamar Nemsitsveridze (Note: Nemsitsveridze was originally crowned the second runner-up at Miss Georgia 2007. However, she received the crown when both Likuchova and the first runner-up were dethroned.)	თამარ ნემსიწვერიძე	Ana Giorgelashvili	ანა გიორგელაშვილი	Tamar Nemsitsveridze	თამარ ნემსიწვერიძე
2008	Khatuna Skhirtladze	ხათუნა სხირტლაძე	Gvantsa Daraselia	გვანცა დარასელია	Khatuna Skhirtladze	ხათუნა სხირტლაძე
2009	Tsira Suknidze	ცირა სუქნიძე	Lika Ordzhonikidze	ლიკა ორჯონიკიძე	Tsira Suknidze	ცირა სუქნიძე
2010	Dea Arakishvili	დეა არაყიშვილი	Nanuka Gogichaishvili	ნანუკა გოგიჩაიშვილი	Dea Arakishvili	დეა არაყიშვილი
2011	Janet Kerdikoshvili	ჟანეტ ქერდიყოშვილი	Eka Gurtskaia	ეკა ღურწკაია	Janet Kerdikoshvili	ჟანეტ ქერდიყოშვილი
2012	Tamar Shedania	თამარ შედანია	Tamar Shedania	თამარ შედანია	Salome Khomeriki	სალომე ხომერიკი
2013	Ana Zubashvili	ანა ზუბაშვილი	Janet Kerdikoshvili (Note: Kerdikoshvili originally was selected to represent Georgia in Miss Universe 2013, but withdrew from the competition shortly before the final due to unexpected health concerns. She was later sent to Miss Universe 2015 instead.)	ჟანეტ ქერდიყოშვილი	Tamar Shedania	თამარ შედანია
2014	No pageant		Ana Zubashvili	ანა ზუბაშვილი	Ana Zubashvili	ანა ზუბაშვილი
2015	Nuka Karalashvili	ნუკა ყარალაშვილი	Janet Kerdikoshvili	ჟანეტ ქერდიყოშვილი	Nuka Karalashvili	ნუკა ყარალაშვილი
2016	No pageant		Nuka Karalashvili	ნუკა ყარალაშვილი	Victoria Kocherova	ვიქტორია კოჩეროვა
2017	Nia Tsivtsivadze	ნია წივწივაძე	Marita Gogodze (Note: Gogodze was selected to represent Georgia at Miss Universe 2017 by IC Model Management. She had previously placed in the top five at Miss Georgia 2015, but was chosen due to Miss Georgia 2017 taking place after Miss Universe 2017.)	მარიტა გოგოძე	Keti Shekelashvili	ქეთი შეყელაშვილი
2018	Nini Gogichaishvili	ნინი გოგიჩაიშვილი	Larissa Petrosyan	ლარისა პეტროსიანი	Nia Tsivtsivadze	ნია ცივცივაძე
2019	No pageant		Tako Adamia	თაკო ადამია	Nini Gogichaishvili	ნინი გოგიჩაიშვილი
2020	No pageant		No national representative due to the COVID-19 pandemic			
2021	No pageant		No national representative due to the COVID-19 pandemic			
2022	No pageant		No national representative due to the COVID-19 pandemic			
2023	No pageant		No national representative due to the COVID-19 pandemic			
2024						

== International pageants ==
=== Miss Georgia Universe ===
- : Declared as Winner
- : Ended as runner-up or top 5/6 qualification
- : Ended as one of the finalists or semifinalists
- : Ended as special awards winner

The winner of Miss Georgia Universe represents her country at the Miss Universe. On occasion, when the winner does not qualify (due to age) for either contest, a runner-up is sent.

Year	Miss Georgia Universe	Georgian Name	Placement at Miss Universe	Special Award(s)
Due to the impact of COVID-19 pandemic, no representative between 2020—2022
2019	Tako Adamia	თაკო ადამია	Unplaced	
2018	Larissa Petrosyan	ლარისა პეტროსიანი	Unplaced	
2017	Marita Gogodze	მარიტა გოგოძე	Unplaced	
2016	Nuka Karalashvili	ნუკა ყარალაშვილი	Unplaced	
2015	Janet Kerdikoshvili	ჟანეტ ქერდიყოშვილი	Unplaced	
2014	Ana Zubashvili	ანა ზუბაშვილი	Unplaced	
2013	Did not compete			
2012	Tamar Shedania	თამარ შედანია	Unplaced	
2011	Eka Gurtskaia	ეკა ღურწკაია	Unplaced	
2010	Nanuka Gogichaishvili	ნანუკა გოგიჩაიშვილი	Unplaced	
2009	Lika Ordzhonikidze	ლიკა ორჯონიკიძე	Unplaced	
2008	Gvantsa Daraselia	გვანცა დარასელია	Unplaced	
2007	Ana Giorgelashvili	ანა გიორგელაშვილი	Unplaced	
2006	Ekaterine Buadze	ეკატერინე ბუაძე	Unplaced	
2005	Rusudan Bochoidze	რუსუდან ბოჩოიძე	Unplaced	
2004	Nino Murtazashvili	ნინო მურთაზაშვილი	Unplaced	

=== Miss Georgia World ===
- : Declared as Winner
- : Ended as runner-up or top 5/6 qualification
- : Ended as one of the finalists or semifinalists
- : Ended as special awards winner

The winner of Miss Georgia World represents her country at the Miss World. On occasion, when the winner does not qualify (due to age) for either contest, a runner-up is sent.:

Year	Miss Georgia World	Georgian Name	Placement at Miss World	Special Award(s)
Due to the impact of COVID-19 pandemic, no pageant Between 2020 and 2022
2019	Nini Gogichaishvili	ნინი გოგიჩაიშვილი	Unplaced	Head-To-Head challenge (Top 20); Miss World Sports (Top 32)
2018	Nia Tsivtsivadze	ნია წივწივაძე	Unplaced	
2017	Keti Shekelashvili	ქეთი შეყელაშვილი	Unplaced	
2016	Victoria Kocherova	ვიქტორია კოჩეროვა	Unplaced	Miss World Top Model (Top 40)
2015	Nuka Karalashvili	ნუკა ყარალაშვილი	Unplaced	Miss World Top Model (Top 20)
2014	Ana Zubashvili	ანა ზუბაშვილი	Unplaced	
2013	Tamar Shedania	თამარ შედანია	Unplaced	
2012	Salome Khomeriki	სალომე ხომერიკი	Unplaced	
2011	Janet Kerdikoshvili	ჟანეტ ქერდიყოშვილი	Unplaced	
2010	Dea Arakishvili	დეა არაყიშვილი	Unplaced	
2009	Tsira Suknidze	ცირა სუქნიძე	Unplaced	Miss World Talent (Top 22)
2008	Khatuna Skhirtladze	ხათუნა სხირტლაძე	Unplaced	
2007	Tamar Nemsitsveridze	თამარ ნემსიწვერიძე	Unplaced	
2006	Nino Kalandadze	ნინო კალანდაძე	Unplaced	Miss World Beach Beauty (Top 20)
2005	Salome Khelashvili	სალომე ხელაშვილი	Unplaced	
2004	Salome Chikviladze	სალომე ჩიკვილაძე	Unplaced	Miss World Top Model (Top 20)
2003	Irina Onashvili	ირინა ონაშვილი	Top 20	Best Talent
