= Tamar Shedania =

Georgian model and beauty pageant titleholder

- Born: Tamar Shedania; 31 January 1992 (age 34); Zugdidi, Georgia
- Height: 1.78 m (5 ft 10 in)
- Beauty pageant titleholder
- Title: Miss Georgia 2012
- Hair color: Blonde
- Eye color: Blue
- Major competitions: Miss Georgia 2012 (Winner); Miss Universe 2012; Miss World 2013

Tamar Shedania (Georgian: თამარ შედანია; born 31 January 1992) is a Georgian model and beauty pageant titleholder who represented her country in the Miss Universe 2012 and Miss World 2013 pageants.

== Early life ==
Tamar Shedania competed in International Elite Model Look contest in 2007. In her professional life and spare time, she loves to travel where she can learn about different cultures and people.

Her vital statistics are: 32 – 23.5 – 34.5 inches.

== Pageantry ==
Tamar Shedania has been crowned Miss Georgia 2012 at the 10th edition of Miss Georgia beauty contest at the Rabati Castle in Akhaltsikhe on 26 September 2012. Shedania represented Georgia in Miss Universe 2012. Although considered a big favorite and a front runner, she failed to place in the Top 16. In some speculations, Tamar was one of the predicted winner of many fans during that year dominating the swimsuit and evening gown round but due to sash factor she didn’t made it. She also represented Georgia in Miss World 2013, but failed to place in the Top 20 Semi-Finalists.

Awards and achievements
Preceded by Eka Gurtskaia	Miss Georgia Universe; 2012	Succeeded by Ana Zubashvili
