= Eka Gurtskaia =

Georgian beauty pageant titleholder (born 1986)

Eka Gurtskaia ეკა ღურწკაია
- Born: Eka Gurtskaia c. 1986 (age 39–40)
- Height: 1.81 m (5 ft 11 1/2 in)
- Beauty pageant titleholder
- Title: Miss Georgia Universe 2011
- Hair color: Brown
- Eye color: Green
- Major competitions: Miss Georgia 2010 (Miss Georgia Universe); Miss Universe 2011

Eka Gurtskaia (Georgian: ეკა ღურწკაია; born c. 1986) is a Georgian beauty pageant titleholder who represented her country at the 2011 Miss Universe pageant.

== Miss Georgia 2010 ==
Gurtskaia, who stands 1.81 m (5 ft 11 1/2 in), competed as one of 23 finalists in the Miss Georgia beauty pageant, held in Batumi on 20 September 2010, when she gained the right to represent Georgia at Miss Universe 2011.

== Miss Universe 2011 ==
As the official representative of Georgia at the 2011 Miss Universe pageant held in São Paulo, Brazil, on 12 September 2011, Gurtskaia competed to succeed Miss Universe titleholder Ximena Navarrete of Mexico.

Awards and achievements
Preceded by Nanuka Gogichaishvili	Miss Georgia Universe; 2011	Succeeded by Tamar Shedania
