= Yulia Polyachikhina =

Russian model and beauty pageant titleholder

- Юлия Полячихина
- Polyachikhina in 2026
- Born: Yulia Sergeyevna Polyachikhina; 6 February 2000 (age 26); Cheboksary, Russia
- Education: Chuvash State University
- Beauty pageant titleholder
- Title: Miss Chuvashia 2016; Miss Russia 2018
- Major competitions: Miss Russia 2018 (Winner); Miss Universe 2018 (Unplaced)

Yulia Sergeyevna Polyachikhina (Russian: Юлия Сергеевна Полячихина; born 6 February 2000) is a Russian model and beauty pageant titleholder who was crowned Miss Russia 2018. She represented Russia at Miss Universe 2018 but did not make it to the top 20.

== Early life ==
Polyachikhina was born in Cheboksary to Russian father Sergey Polyachikhin and Chuvash mother Olga Polyachikhina. Prior to becoming Miss Russia, Polyachikhina was studying journalism at the Chuvash State University. She has worked as a professional model in Paris and Osaka.

== Pageantry ==
Polyachikhina began her pageantry career after competing in Miss Chuvashia 2015, where she was the first runner-up. She won the following year and was crowned Miss Chuvashia 2016. Afterwards, she represented Russia at Miss Globe 2016 and reached the top ten. Polyachikhina later represented Chuvashia at Miss Russia 2018 in Moscow. She went on to win the competition, succeeding Polina Popova of Sverdlovsk Oblast. Her runners-up were Violetta Tyurkina of Belgorod and Natalya Stroeva of Yakutia. As part of the winning prize, she received a brand new car and ₽3 million. As Miss Russia, she represented Russia at Miss Universe 2018, and was unplaced.

Polyachikhina crowned Alina Sanko of Azov as her successor at Miss Russia 2019 on 13 April 2019.

Awards and achievements
| Preceded by Polina Popova, Sverdlovsk Oblast | Miss Russia; 2018 | Succeeded by Alina Sanko, Azov |
| Preceded by Kseniya Alexandrova, Moscow | Miss Universe Russia; 2018 | Succeeded by Alina Sanko, Azov |
