= Polina Popova =

Russian model and Miss Russia 2017

- Полина Попова
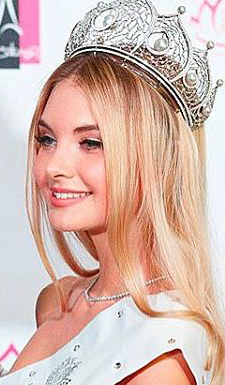
- Popova after being crowned Miss Russia 2017
- Born: Polina Alexeyevna Popova; 1 June 1995 (age 31); Yekaterinburg, Russia
- Height: 1.78 m (5 ft 10 in)
- Children: 1
- Beauty pageant titleholder
- Title: Miss Russia 2017
- Hair color: Blonde
- Eye color: Blue
- Major competitions: Miss Russia 2017 (Winner); Miss World 2017 (Top 10)

Polina Alexeyevna Popova (Russian: Полина Алексеевна Попова; born 1 June 1995) is a Russian model and beauty pageant titleholder who was crowned Miss Russia 2017. She represented Russia at the Miss World 2017 competition, where she placed in the Top 10.

== Early life ==
Popova was born in Yekaterinburg. She works as a model, and in addition to Russian, she can speak fluent English and Chinese. Prior to Miss Russia, Popova was studying at Moscow State University, with plans to become a journalist.

== Personal life ==
Prior to marrying her husband, he was her boyfriend, however she did not want to talk about her personal life being a really private person. They married on February 11, 2020. On May 25, 2020, she gave birth to their child named Alexander.

== Pageantry ==
=== Miss Russia 2017 ===
Popova represented Sverdlovsk Oblast in the Miss Russia 2017 pageant; it was her first ever pageant. She went on to win the competition, winning ₽3,000,000, a Hyundai Solaris, and the opportunity to study at any university in the world. Her runners-up were Ksenia Alexandrova of Moscow and Albina Akhtyamova of Bashkortostan.

=== Miss World 2017 ===
Popova represented Russia in the Miss World 2017 competition, where she placed in the Top 10.

Awards and achievements
Preceded by (Tyumen Oblast) Yana Dobrovolskaya	Miss Russia; 2017	Succeeded by (Chuvashia) Yulia Polyachikhina
