= Olga Serejnikova =

Belarusian model (born 1978)

- Born: 21 September 1978 (age 48); Minsk, Belarus
- Modeling information
- Height: 1.76 m (5 ft 9 in)
- Hair color: Black
- Eye color: Brown
- Website: http://www.belarusmodels.by

Olga Valeryevna Serejnikova (Belarusian: Вольга Валер'еўна Сярэжнікава, Russian: Ольга Валерьевна Сережникова; born 21 September 1978) is a Belarusian model, National Beauty School manager and art director.

== Biography ==
On September 21, 1978, Serejnikova was born in Minsk, Belarus. As a child she enjoyed dancing, painting, and designing. When she was 15 years old, she started working in a model agency in Minsk. After finishing school, she was certified as an economist, and worked in that profession.

Serejnikova, with her atypical for Belarus, rather exotic appearance, attracts mass-media attention: she gives interviews, shoots for magazine covers, and participates as a member of the jury in beauty pageants.

== Beauty contests ==
- In 2002 Serejnikova won the "Miss Photo" title at the "Miss Belarus" national beauty contest.
- She was given "Audience Choice Award" from the First National TV-Channel.
- In 2003 she represented Belarus in the international beauty pageant "Miss Europe" in Paris. During the 30 days she spent in Paris, she was photographed for the French ELLE and modelled in the Chopard jewelry show.

== National Beauty School ==
In 2003 Olga became the head of the National Beauty School, having become the organizer of Miss Belarus, the National Beauty Contest, and Miss Minsk.
