= Rating-Agentur Expert RA GmbH =

- Industry: Financial services
- Founded: 2013
- Headquarters: Frankfurt am Main, Germany
- Key people: Svetlana Grishankova (Managing Director)
- Website: https://raexpert.eu/

Rating-Agentur Expert RA GmbH (RAEX Europe) is a credit rating agency established in Frankfurt am Main, Germany. The agency is a business unit of International group RAEX operating in the European Union since 2013. It is the first rating agency with Russian roots, officially recognized by European Union Supervisory Authority.

== European Regulation ==
The European Securities and Markets Authority (ESMA) the EU's direct supervisor of credit rating agencies (CRAs), has registered Rating-Agentur Expert RA GmbH as a CRA under Regulation (EC) No 1060/2009 of the European Parliament and of the Council of 16 September 2009 on credit rating agencies with effect from 1 December 2015. The Agency received an official status of the External Credit Assessment Institution (ECAI), and the credit ratings issued by the agency can be used for regulatory purposes on financial markets of the European Union.

== Activities ==
Rating-Agentur Expert RA GmbH assigns credit ratings to financial institutions, insurance undertakings, non-financial companies and public finance, as well as sovereign ratings for countries and regions.

The first public non-sovereign rating was assigned by the agency to a Russian bank JSC CB "Assotsiatsiya". In the beginning of 2017 Rating-Agentur Expert RA GmbH has issued credit ratings to Russian regions - Krasnodar region and Chuvash republic. In May 2017 the agency has assigned rating of creditworthiness to Latvian insurance company Balcia Insurance SE.

== Sovereign ratings ==
On a half-year basis Rating-Agentur Expert RA GmbH conducts scheduled reviews of unsolicited sovereign ratings and prepares reports on economic situation of countries. RAEX Europe issues sovereign government rating, reflecting the Agency's opinion on the government's ability to meet current and future financial obligations, and country credit environment rating, which is a measure of the systemic credit risks of the country in comparison with other countries of the world. Among these countries are Russia, Kazakhstan, Kyrgyzstan, Armenia, Belarus, Germany, Uzbekistan, Cyprus, China and USA.

== ESG ratings ==
Rating-Agentur Expert RA GmbH is a signatory of the ESG in Credit Rating Statement maintained by the UNPRI.

An ESG rating represents the opinion of the Agency on the environmental, social and governance strengths and weaknesses of a rated entity. On the 5th of October 2017 RAEX Europe assigned the first ESG rating to Chuvash Region.

== Green Bond Second Opinion ==
RAEX-Europe provides services of the issuance of Green Bond Second Opinion. The Green Bond Second Opinion is an independent opinion defining how the framework of the issued green bonds complies with the Green Bond Principles and defining the issuer’s environmental performance related to the eligible projects. On 19 December 2018 the Agency issued a Second Opinion for the first Green Bonds issued in Russia by “RSB HMAO” Ltd. (a subsidiary of “Waste Management” JSC). RAEX-Europe is added to the External Review Service Mapping maintained by ICMA and "RSB HMAO Ltd." bond is included to ICMA database and to the international register of green bonds - the Environmental Finance Bond Database (EFBD).

== Memorandum of understanding ==
On 17 December 2018 in Beijing a cooperation memorandum was signed by four credit rating agencies: largest Chinese rating agency China Chengxin International Credit Rating Co., Ltd.(CCXI), Rating-Agentur Expert RA GmbH (RAEX-Europe), Pakistan rating agency JCR-VIS Credit Rating Co. Ltd. and the Bahraini Islamic International Rating Agency (IIRA). The main purpose of this alliance is to provide informational support for investors to the Belt & Road countries and projects. The agencies prepared the annual joint report “Country Risk Report Along the Belt and Road 2018”.
