= Ana Zubashvili =

Georgian beauty queen (born 1993)

Ana Zubashivili
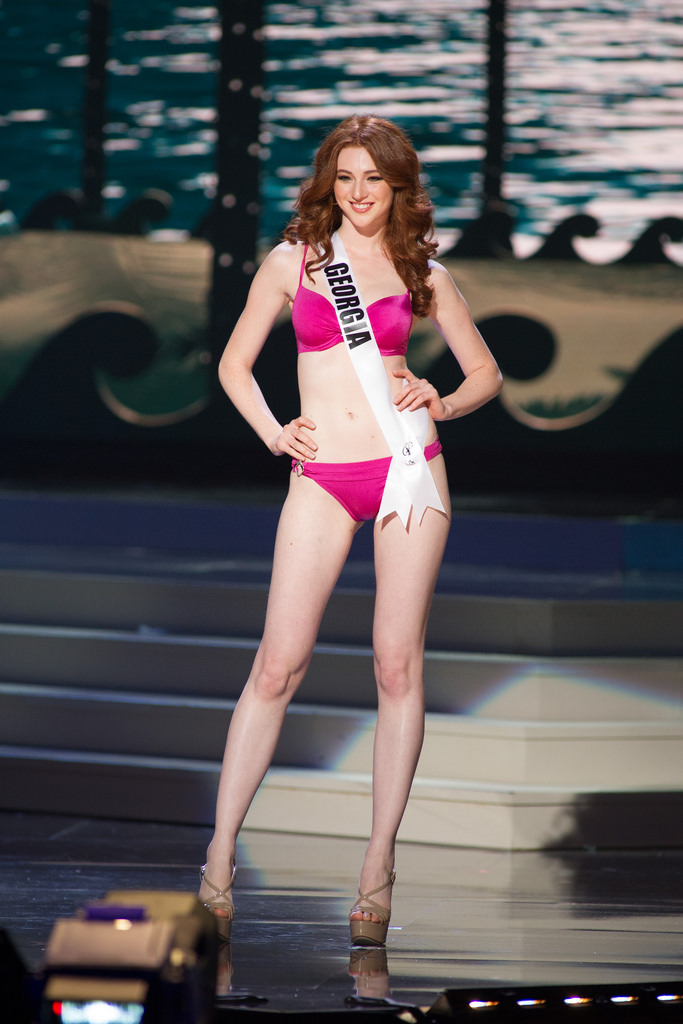
- Ana Zubashivili (2014)
- Born: 11 October 1993 (age 32); Tbilisi, Georgia
- Height: 177 cm (5 ft 9 1/2 in)
- Beauty pageant titleholder
- Title: Miss Georgia 2014
- Hair color: Red
- Eye color: light brown
- Major competitions: Miss Georgia 2014 (Winner); Miss World 2014 (Unplaced); Miss Universe 2014 (Unplaced)

Ana Zubashvili (Georgian: ანა ზუბაშვილი) is a Georgian beauty pageant titleholder who was crowned Miss Georgia 2014. She competed at Miss World 2014 and Miss Universe 2014.

== Early life ==
Ana was a student at Tbilisi State University.

== Pageantry ==
=== Miss Georgia 2014 ===
Ana was crowned as Miss Georgia 2014 on 9 February 2014, at the Pavilion in the capital city of Tbilisi.

=== Miss World 2014 ===
Ana represented Georgia at the Miss World 2014 pageant in London but did not place among the semifinalists.

=== Miss Universe 2014 ===
Ana represented Georgia at the Miss Universe 2014 pageant but did not place among the semifinalists.

Awards and achievements
| Preceded by Tamar Shedania | Miss Georgia; 2014 | Succeeded by Nuka Karalashvili |
