= Yana Dobrovolskaya =

Miss Russia 2016

- Яна Добровольская
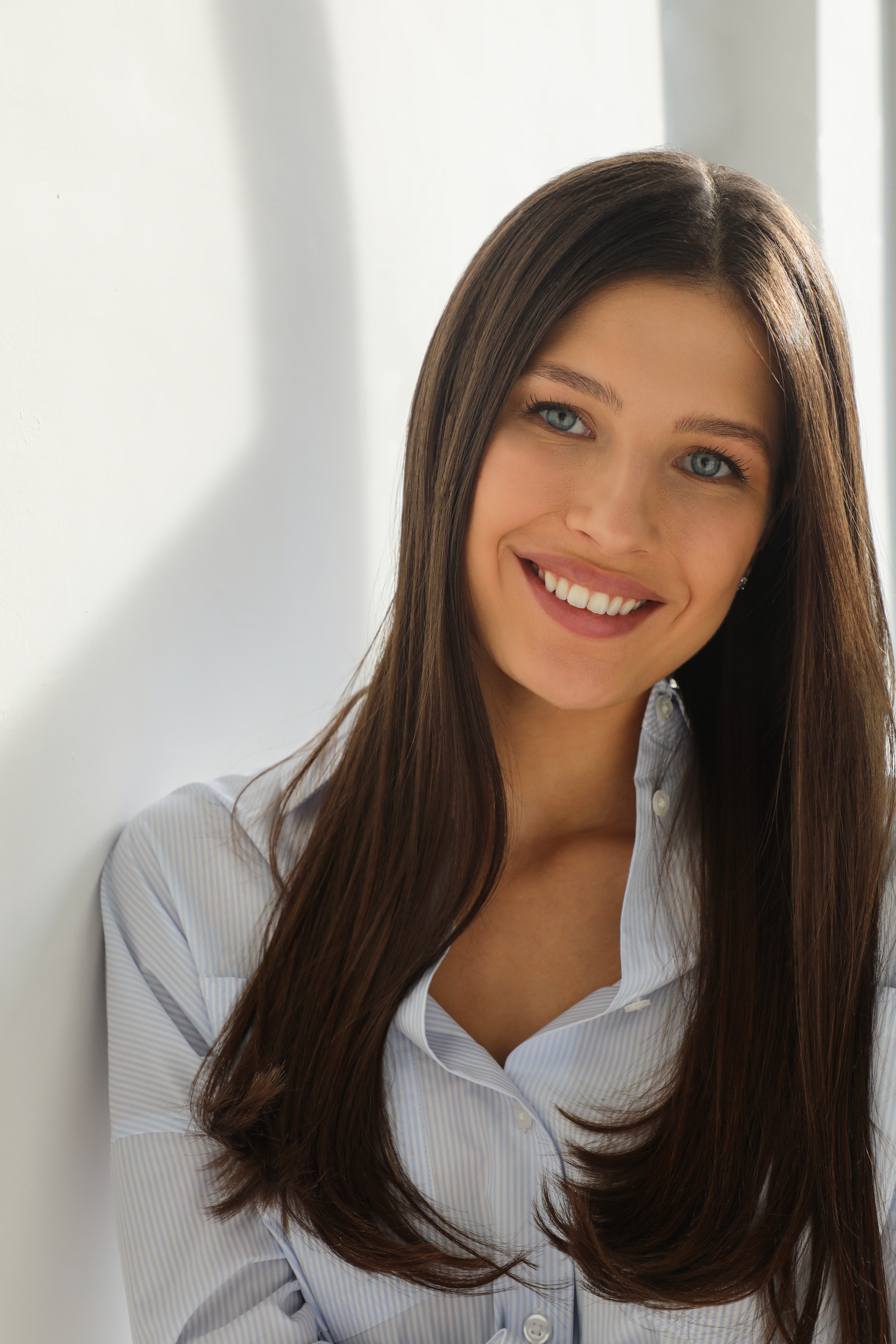
- Born: Yana Denisovna Dobrovolskaya; 8 December 1997 (age 28); Tyumen, Russia
- Height: 1.74 m (5 ft 9 in)
- Spouse: Ilya Piskulin (m. 2022)
- Children: 1
- Beauty pageant titleholder
- Title: Miss Russia 2016
- Hair color: Brown
- Eye color: Blue
- Major competitions: Miss Russia 2016 (Winner); Miss World 2016 (Unplaced)

Yana Denisovna Dobrovolskaya (Russian: Яна Денисовна Добровольская, born 8 December 1997) is a Russian dancer, model, and beauty pageant titleholder who won Miss Russia 2016. She represented Russia at the Miss World 2016 pageant.

== Miss Russia 2016 ==
Dobrovolskaya competed as Miss Tyumen in Miss Russia 2016 on April 16, 2016. She was later declared the winner, succeeding Miss Russia 2015 Sofia Nikitchuk of Yekaterinburg.

== Miss World 2016 ==
Dobrovolskaya represented Russia in the Miss World 2016 pageant where she was unplaced.

== Personal life ==
Dobrovolskaya married businessman Ilya Piskulin on December 24, 2022 in Central Park, New York City. On May 20, 2024, they welcomed their first child together, a son.

Awards and achievements
Preceded by Sofia Nikitchuk	Miss Russia; 2016	Succeeded by Polina Popova
