= Khatuna Skhirtladze =

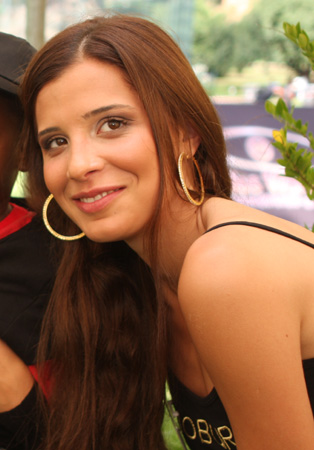
Miss Georgia 2008 Khatuna Skhirtladze during Miss World 08 in Johannesburg

Khatuna Skhirtladze (Georgian: ხათუნა სხირტლაძე, born c. 1990) is a Georgian model and beauty pageant titleholder who was crowned Miss Georgia 2008. She represented Georgia in Miss Intercontinental 2008, where she placed in the top fifteen, as well as in Miss Leisure 2008, and Miss World 2008.

Preceded by Tamar Nemsitsveridze	Miss Georgia (country); 2008	Succeeded by Tsira Suknidze
