= Sofia Nikitchuk =

Russian model (born 1993)

Sofia Nikitchuk София Никитчук
- Born: Sofia Viktorovna Nikitchuk; 20 October 1993 (age 32); Snezhinsk, Chelyabinsk Oblast, Russia
- Occupations: Actress, model
- Height: 1.77 m (5 ft 10 in)
- Beauty pageant titleholder
- Title: Miss Russia 2015
- Hair color: Brown
- Eye color: Hazel
- Major competitions: Miss Russia 2015 (Winner); Miss World 2015 (1st Runner-Up)

Sofia Viktorovna Nikitchuk (Russian: София Викторовна Никитчук; born 20 October 1993) is a Russian actress, model and beauty pageant titleholder who was crowned Miss Russia 2015 and represented her country at the Miss World 2015 pageant.

== Pageantry ==
In 2015 she won the title of Miss Yekaterinburg. She represented the Sverdlovsk Oblast subdivision at the Miss Russia 2015 contest.

=== Miss Russia 2015 ===
On 18 April 2015 was crowned Miss Russia 2015 at Barvikha Luxury Village Concert Hall in Moscow.

=== Miss World 2015 ===
As Miss Russia 2015, represented Russia at Miss World 2015. She was awarded 1st-runner up on 19 December.

Awards and achievements
Preceded by (Hungary) Edina Kulcsár	Miss World 1st Runner Up; 2015	Succeeded by (Dominican Republic) Yaritza Reyes
Preceded by Yulia Alipova	Miss Russia; 2015	Succeeded by Yana Dobrovolskaya
