= Miss World 2016 =

Beauty pageant edition

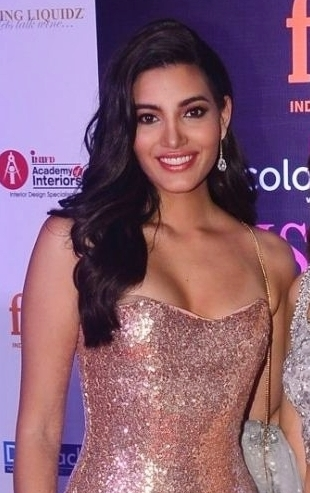
- Stephanie Del Valle, Miss World 2016
- Date: 18 December 2016
- Presenters: Jason Cook; Megan Young; Frankie Cena; Steve Douglas
- Entertainment: Rodrick Dixon, Morrison Brothers
- Venue: MGM National Harbor, Oxon Hill, Maryland, United States
- Broadcaster: E!; London Live
- Entrants: 117
- Placements: 20
- Debuts: Rwanda
- Withdrawals: Bermuda; Cameroon; Ethiopia; Gabon; Macedonia; Namibia; Norway; Saint Kitts and Nevis; Samoa; Zambia; Zimbabwe
- Returns: Antigua and Barbuda; Belarus; Canada; Cayman Islands; Cook Islands; Democratic Republic of the Congo; Egypt; Equatorial Guinea; Ghana; Guinea-Bissau; Israel; Saint Lucia; Sierra Leone
- Winner: Stephanie Del Valle; Puerto Rico

Miss World 2016 was the 66th edition of the Miss World pageant, held at the MGM National Harbor in Oxon Hill, Maryland, United States, on 18 December 2016.

At the conclusion of the event, Mireia Lalaguna of Spain crowned her successor Stephanie Del Valle of Puerto Rico at the end of the event. It was the second time the Miss World pageant was held in the United States, and the second time where Puerto Rico was crowned Miss World, after Wilnelia Merced in 1975. The first and second runners-up was Yaritza Reyes from the Dominican Republic and Natasha Mannuela Halim from Indonesia.

== Selection of participants ==
=== Replacements ===
Camila Macías of Argentina, was crowned the new Belleza Argentina 2016 by Nadia Cerri, the national director of Belleza Argentina pageant, after Elena Roca, the original winner was dethroned for committing repeated breaches of obligations stipulated in her contract. Macias represented the province of Córdoba at Belleza Argentina 2016 and was the first runner-up at the pageant.

Lebakile Mokhohlane, the original winner of Miss Lesotho 2016 pageant, declined to participate at Miss World 2016 pageant due to her study commitments, hence Rethabile Tsosane was appointed to replace Mokhohlane. Tsosane was the fourth runner-up at Miss Lesotho 2016 pageant and had also won the Top Model award.

Evelyn Njambi replaced Roshanara Ebrahim, Miss World Kenya 2016 after she was stripped of her title by Terry Muigai, the national director of Miss World Kenya pageant for the breach of code of conduct stipulated in her contract. Njambi represented Kiambu County at the Miss World Kenya 2016 and was the first runner-up at the pageant

=== Debuts, returns, and, withdrawals ===
This edition saw the debut of Rwanda, and the return of Antigua and Barbuda, Belarus, Canada, Cayman Islands, Cook Islands, the Democratic Republic of the Congo, Egypt, Equatorial Guinea, Ghana, Guinea-Bissau, Israel, Saint Lucia and Sierra Leone; Cook Islands, which last competed in 1990, Antigua and Barbuda and the Democratic Republic of the Congo in 2008, Saint Lucia in 2010, Cayman Islands in 2011, Sierra Leone in 2012, Guinea-Bissau in 2013 and Belarus, Canada, Egypt, Equatorial Guinea, Ghana and Israel in 2014.

Bermuda, Cameroon, Ethiopia, Gabon, Macedonia, Namibia, Norway, Saint Kitts and Nevis, Samoa, Zambia and Zimbabwe, withdrew from the competition.

== Results ==
=== Placements ===
Placement	Contestant
Miss World 2016	Puerto Rico – Stephanie Del Valle
1st Runner-Up	Dominican Republic – Yaritza Reyes
2nd Runner-Up	Indonesia – Natasha Mannuela Halim
Top 5	Kenya – Evelyn Njambi; Philippines – Catriona Gray
Top 11	Belgium – Lenty Frans; Brazil – Beatrice Fontoura; China – Jing Kong; Mongolia – Bayartsetseg Altangerel §; South Korea – Myriam Wang; United States – Audra Mari
Top 20	Australia – Madeline Cowe; Cook Islands – Natalia Short; France – Morgane Edvige; Ghana – Antoinette Kemavor; Hungary – Tímea Gelencsér; India – Priyadarshini Chatterjee; Japan – Priyanka Yoshikawa; Slovakia – Kristína Činčurová; Thailand – Jinnita Buddee

§ People's Choice winner

==== Continental Queens of Beauty ====
Continental Group	Contestant
Africa	Kenya – Evelyn Njambi
Americas	United States – Audra Mari
Asia	Indonesia – Natasha Mannuela Halim
Caribbean	Dominican Republic – Yaritza Reyes
Europe	Belgium – Lenty Frans
Oceania	Australia – Madeline Cowe

== Challenge events ==
The Miss World Organization reintroduced for the 2016 finals the Fast-Track system, in which the winners of the five Challenge Events automatically earned a place in the Top 20. The 2016 Challenge Events included Sports, Top Model, Talent, Multimedia and Beauty With A Purpose. The Interview scores determined the rest of the Top 20.

=== Top Model ===
Miss China won the Top Model Competition held on 15 December 2016. She became the second quarter-finalist of Miss World 2016.

Placement	Contestant
Winner	China – Jing Kong
2nd place	Indonesia – Natasha Mannuela Halim
3rd place	Dominican Republic – Yaritza Reyes
Top 5	France – Morgane Edvige; Kenya – Evelyn Njambi

=== Talent ===
Miss World worked in partnership with Mobstar to conduct the public vote and find the winner of the Talent challenge. Miss Mongolia received the most votes and became the third quarter-finalist of Miss World 2016.

Placement	Contestant
Winner	Mongolia – Bayartsetseg Altangerel
Top 10	Canada – Anastasia Lin; Chile – Antonia Figueroa; Croatia – Angélica Zacchigna; Hungary – Tímea Gelencsér; Latvia – Linda Kinca; Malta – Anthea Zammit; Philippines – Catriona Gray; Poland – Kaja Klimkiewicz; Ukraine – Oleksandra Kucherenko
Top 21	Cook Islands – Natalia Short; Czech Republic – Natálie Kotková; Ecuador – Mirka Cabrera; Fiji – Pooja Priyanka; India – Priyadarshini Chatterjee; Puerto Rico – Stephanie Del Valle; Russia – Yana Dobrovolskaya; Scotland – Lucy Kerr; Serbia – Katarina Šulkić; Slovenia – Maja Taradi; South Africa – Ntandoyenkosi Kunene

=== Multimedia ===
Miss Philippines was named the winner of the Multimedia challenge and became the fourth quarter-finalist of Miss World 2016. The decision was based on the candidate's posts on her official Facebook page and Twitter account, as well as her Mobstar ranking.

Placement	Contestant
Winner	Philippines – Catriona Gray

=== Beauty With a Purpose ===
Five finalists were announced on 17 December 2016. Miss Indonesia was named the winner during the final night and became the fifth quarter-finalist of Miss World 2016.

Placement	Contestant
Winner	Indonesia – Natasha Mannuela Halim
Top 5	India – Priyadarshini Chatterjee; Kenya – Evelyn Njambi; Nepal – Asmi Shrestha; Philippines – Catriona Gray

== Contestants ==
117 delegates competed in Miss World 2016:

Country/Territory	Contestant	Age (Note: Ages at the time in the pageant)	Hometown
Albania	Ëndrra Kovaçi	21	Tirana
Antigua and Barbuda	Latisha Greene	24	St. John's
Argentina	Camila Macias	19	Córdoba
Aruba	Lynette Do Nascimento	23	Oranjestad
Australia	Madeline Cowe	24	Tully
Austria	Dragana Stanković	20	Traiskirchen
(The Bahamas) Bahamas	Ashley Hamilton	24	Long Island
Belarus	Polina Borodacheva	23	Minsk
Belgium	Lenty Frans	22	Antwerp
Belize	Iris Salguero	21	Belmopan
Bolivia	Leyda Suarez	20	Tarija
(Bosnia and Herzegovina) Bosnia & Herzegovina	Halida Krajišnik	19	Živinice
Botswana	Thata Kenosi	21	Gaborone
Brazil	Beatrice Fontoura	26	Goiânia
British Virgin Islands	Kadia Turnbull	25	Road Town
Bulgaria	Galina Mihaylova	26	Sofia
Canada	Anastasia Lin	26	Toronto
Cayman Islands	Monyque Brooks	24	West Bay
Chile	Antonia Figueroa	21	Coquimbo
China	Jing Kong	21	Nanyang, Henan
Colombia	Shirley Atehortua	23	Pereira
Cook Islands	Natalia Short	22	Avarua
Costa Rica	Melania González	25	San José
(Ivory Coast) Côte d'Ivoire	Esther Memel	20	Yamoussoukro
Croatia	Angélica Zacchigna	22	Pazin
Curaçao	Sabrina Namias de Castro	20	Willemstad
Cyprus	María Moráru	23	Nicosia
Czech Republic	Natálie Kotková	22	Prague
(Democratic Republic of the Congo) Democratic Republic Congo	Andrea Moloto	25	Kinshasa
Denmark	Helena Heuser	20	Copenhagen
Dominican Republic	Yaritza Reyes	23	Santo Domingo
Ecuador	Mirka Cabrera	22	Machala
Egypt	Nadeen Osama El Sayed	18	Cairo
El Salvador	Ana Cortez	21	Santa Ana
England	Elizabeth Grant	20	Preston
Equatorial Guinea	Anunciación Ongueme Esono	21	Micomeseng
Fiji	Pooja Priyanka	25	Ba
Finland	Heta Sallinen	21	Turku
France	Morgane Edvige	20	Le François
(Georgia (country)) Georgia	Victoria Kocherova	21	Tbilisi
Germany	Selina Kriechbaum	21	Frankfurt
Ghana	Antoinette Delali Kemavor	21	Accra
Gibraltar	Kayley Mifsud	24	Gibraltar
Guadeloupe	Magalie Adelson	23	Basse-Terre
Guam	Phoebe Denight Palisoc	17	Tamuning
Guatemala	Melanie Espina	22	Guatemala City
Guinea	Safiatou Baldé	21	Conakry
Guinea-Bissau	Sandra Araújo	19	Bissau
Guyana	Nuriyyih Gerrard	25	Georgetown
Haiti	Suzana Sampeur	21	Port-au-Prince
Honduras	Kerelyne Campigotti Webster	18	El Progreso
Hungary	Tímea Gelencsér	22	Budapest
Iceland	Anna Orlowska	22	Reykjavík
India	Priyadarshini Chatterjee	20	Guwahati
Indonesia	Natasha Mannuela Halim	22	Pangkal Pinang
(Republic of Ireland) Ireland	Niamh Kennedy	22	Portroe
Israel	Karin Alia	18	Tel Aviv
Italy	Giada Tropea	18	Lamezia Terme
Jamaica	Ashlie Barrett	21	Kingston
Japan	Priyanka Yoshikawa	22	Tokyo
Kazakhstan	Alia Mergenbaeva	18	Aktau
Kenya	Evelyn Njambi	22	Nairobi
Kyrgyzstan	Perizat Rasulbek-Kyzy	18	Bishkek
Latvia	Linda Kinca	18	Ķekava
Lebanon	Sandy Tabet	21	Beirut
Lesotho	Rethabile Tsosane	21	Maseru
Malaysia	Tatiana Kumar	18	Kuala Lumpur
Malta	Anthea Zammit	22	Żebbuġ
Mauritius	Véronique Allas	20	Port Louis
Mexico	Ana Girault	25	Mexico City
Moldova	Daniela Marin	17	Leova
Mongolia	Bayartsetseg Altangerel	26	Ulaanbaatar
Montenegro	Katarina Keković	22	Podgorica
Myanmar	Myat Thiri Lwin	18	Naypyidaw
Nepal	Asmi Shrestha	23	Tandi
Netherlands	Rachelle Reijnders	24	Amsterdam
New Zealand	Karla De Beer	23	Auckland
Nicaragua	María Laura Ramírez	19	Masaya
Nigeria	Debbie Collins	24	Lagos
Northern Ireland	Emma Carswell	21	Belfast
Panama	Alessandra Bueno	25	Panama City
Paraguay	Simone Freitag	21	Ciudad del Este
Peru	Pierina Wong	25	Lambayeque
Philippines	Catriona Gray	22	Oas
Poland	Kaja Klimkiewicz	19	Glinojeck
Portugal	Cristiana Viana	19	Valbom
Puerto Rico	Stephanie Del Valle	19	San Juan
Romania	Diana Dinu	22	Bucharest
Russia	Yana Dobrovolskaya	19	Tyumen
Rwanda	Jolly Mutesi	20	Kigali
Saint Lucia	La Toya Moffat	24	Castries
Scotland	Lucy Kerr	19	East Dunbartonshire
Serbia	Katarina Šulkić	18	Belgrade
Seychelles	Christine Barbier	24	Victoria
Sierra Leone	Aminata Adialin Bangura	22	Port Loko
Singapore	Bhaama Padmanathan	24	Singapore
Slovakia	Kristína Činčurová	19	Lučenec
Slovenia	Maja Taradi	26	Ljubljana
South Africa	Ntandoyenkosi Kunene	24	Mkhondo
South Korea (Note: Competed as Korea in the pageant)	Hyun Wang	21	Seoul
South Sudan	Akuany Ayuen	23	Juba
Spain	Raquel Tejedor	20	Zaragoza
Sri Lanka	Amritaa De Silva	23	Colombo
Sweden	Emma Strandberg	20	Stockholm
Tanzania	Diana Luqumay	18	Dodoma
Thailand	Jinnita Buddee	22	Chiang Rai
Trinidad and Tobago	Daniella Walcott	24	Port of Spain
Tunisia	Mariem Hammami	22	Béja
Turkey	Buse İskenderoğlu	19	Ankara
Uganda	Leah Kagasa	21	Kampala
Ukraine	Oleksandra Kucherenko	19	Dnipro
United States	Audra Mari	22	Fargo
United States Virgin Islands	Kyrelle Thomas	18	Charlotte Amalie
Uruguay	Romina Trotto	19	Montevideo
Venezuela	Diana Croce	19	Calabozo
Vietnam	Trương Thị Diệu Ngọc	26	Danang
Wales	Ffion Moyle	23	Carmarthen

== Notes ==
=== Designations ===
- (Antigua and Barbuda) Antigua & Barbuda – Latisha Greene was appointed as Miss Antigua & Barbuda World by Calvin Southwell, president of Antigua Pageants Ltd and national director of Miss World in the island nation.
- British Virgin Islands – Kadia Turnbull was chosen Miss World British Virgin Islands 2016 at a casting call held by Damion Grange, the national director of Miss World British Virgin Islands pageant.
- Costa Rica - Melania González was appointed Miss Mundo Costa Rica 2016 after a casting call was organized by Allan Aleman, the national director of Reinas de Costa Rica pageant who is also franchise holder for Miss World in Costa Rica.
- El Salvador - Ana Cortez was appointed to represent El Salvador at Miss World 2016 by Telecorporacion Salvadorena, the license holder for Miss World in El Salvador after the national pageant, Nuestra Belleza El Salvador was not held for the second consecutive year. Cortez works for the company as a TV presenter and DJ radio host.
- Germany - Selina Kriechbaum was appointed to compete at Miss World 2016 by Detlef Tursies, the national director of Miss Deutschland pageant after the 2016 edition of the pageant was postponed to early November. Kriechbaum represented the state of Hesse at Miss Deutschland 2015 and was the 3rd runner-up at the pageant.
- Mongolia - Bayartsetseg Altangerel was appointed Miss World Mongolia 2016 after a casting call was organized by Asian Future Group the franchise holder for Miss World in Mongolia.
- Montenegro - Katarina Keković, Miss Universe Montenegro 2015 was appointed to compete at Miss World 2016 by Vesna De Vinča, the national director of Miss Montenegro pageant who decided to send Tea Babic, Miss Montenegro 2016 to Miss World 2017 pageant so as to allow more preparation time for the new delegate after the national contest was postponed to late October 2016. Keković was the 1st runner-up at Miss Montenegro 2015 pageant and was supposed to compete at Miss Universe 2016 however she has been replaced by Adela Zoranić, Miss Universe Montenegro 2016.
- Nigeria - Debbie Collins, MBGN Universe 2015 was appointed to compete at Miss World 2016 by Silverbird Group, the license holder for Miss World in Nigeria after MBGN 2016 pageant was cancelled because of economic recession plaguing the country. Collins represent the Ebonyi State at MBGN 2015 and was the 1st runner-up at the pageant.
- Panama – Alessandra Bueno was chosen Señorita Panamá Mundo 2016 by Edwin Dominguez after being appointed the new franchise holder for Miss World in Panama. Bueno was selected at casting call held in association with Justine Pasek and Cesar Anel Rodríguez, the organizers of Señorita Panamá pageant due to time constraints in organizing the pageant. Previously Medcom Corporation under the direction of Marisela Moreno held the franchise for Miss World in Panama.
- Romania – Diana Dinu was appointed Miss World Romania 2016 by Ernest Hadrian Böhm, the national director of Miss World Romania after a casting call was organized by ExclusivEvent agency franchise holders for Miss World in Romania.
- Singapore - Bhamaa Padmanathan was appointed Miss World Singapore 2016 after a casting call was held by Inès Ligron the new national director of Miss World Singapore pageant. Previously Raymund Ooi held the franchise for Miss World in Singapore.
- Trinidad and Tobago - Daniella Marie Walcott was appointed Miss World Trinidad and Tobago 2016, by Vanessa Sahatoo-Manoo, the President of Oneness Entertainment and the national director of Miss World Trinidad & Tobago pageant after taking into account the weak corporate economic situation in the country. Walcott is also the younger sister of Gabrielle Walcott who was 2nd runner-up at Miss World 2008 and also the cousin of Magdalene Walcott, who made it to the Top 20 at Miss World 2003. Daniella has been training since she was 12 years old by Miss World 1986, Giselle Laronde to become Miss World.
- Tunisia – Meriem Hammemi was appointed to represent Tunisia at Miss World 2016 by Aida Antar the national director of Miss Tunisie pageant because of scheduling conflicts after the 2016 edition of the pageant was postponed to early December 2016. Hammemi represented the Governorate of Béja at the Miss Tunisie 2015 and was the 2nd runner-up at the pageant.
- United States Virgin Islands - Kyrelle Thomas was appointed Miss US Paradise World 2016 after a casting call was organised by Cnydee Frontal, the national director of Miss US Paradise pageant.
- Venezuela - Diana Croce was appointed to compete at Miss World 2016 by Osmel Sousa, the national director of Miss Venezuela pageant after Miss Venezuela Mundo 2016 pageant was not held because of ongoing economic recession in the country. Croce represented the state of Nueva Esparta at Miss Venezuela 2016 and was the 1st Runner-Up at the pageant.

=== Replacements ===
- Curaçao – Nashaira Balentien, Miss World Curaçao 2016 will not compete in this edition due personal reason. Sabrina Namias de Castro, replace her, Sabrina previously competed at Reina Hispanoamericana 2016.
- France - Morgane Edvige was appointed Miss World France 2016 by Sylvie Tellier, the national director of Miss France pageant, as a replacement to Iris Mittenaere, Miss France 2016, who will not be able to compete at Miss World contest because of conflicting schedules, as she crowns her successor just a day before the Miss World 2016 finals. Edvige represented the island of Martinique at Miss France 2016 and was the 1st runner-up at the pageant. Mittenaere would later win Miss Universe 2016 in Manila.

=== Withdrawals ===
- Bermuda– Miss Bermuda 2016 pageant was not held due to lack of funding and sponsorship.
- Cameroon – Julia Nguimfack, Miss Cameroon 2016 withdrew due to visa problems.
- Ethiopia – Soliyana Assefa, Miss Ethiopia 2016 withdrew at the last minute.
- Gabon – Miss Gabon 2016 pageant was postponed due to the political turmoil and unrest in the country that followed after the general elections.
- Macedonia – No delegate was appointed due to lack of funding and sponsorship.
- Namibia – Lizelle Esterhuizen, Miss Namibia 2016, not compete at Miss World pageant after Conny Maritz, the national director of the Miss Namibia pageant, decided to send Esterhuizen only to Miss Universe 2016 due to lack of funding and sponsorship. Usually the winner of Miss Namibia pageant competes at both Miss World and Miss Universe pageants.
- Norway – No delegate was appointed due to lack of funding and sponsorship.
- Saint Kitts and Nevis– No delegate was appointed due to lack of funding and sponsorship.
- Samoa – No delegate was appointed due to lack of funding and sponsorship.
- Zambia – the Miss Zambia 2016 pageant finals were scheduled just a day before the Miss World finals.
- Zimbabwe – Miss Zimbabwe Trust chairperson Mary Chiwenga cancelled the 2016 edition of the Miss Zimbabwe pageant due to lack of quality candidates to compete at an international level.
