= Youssef Mansour (actor) =

- Born: 1966 (age 59–60)
- Known for: Martial artist, actor, producer, director
- Notable work: Qabdet El Hilaly ("El Hilaly's Fist") El Shares ("The Fierce") Desert Cat

Youssef Mansour (Arabic: يوسف منصور) is an Egyptian martial artist, actor, producer, and director best known for his martial arts films. Born in Cairo, he trained in the style of Kung-fu in China and America before embarking on a film career. He entered the Egyptian film industry by chance when he met director Ibrahim Afifi and was offered his first role in the movie El Agooz Wil Baltagi ("The Old Man and the Thug") in 1989. He became famous in the 1990s for starring in Egyptian films that relied on martial arts, such as Qabdet El Hilaly ("El Hilaly's Fist") in 1991, El Shares ("The Fierce") in 1992, and "Desert Cat" in 1995.

== Early life and education ==
Youssef Mansour was born in Cairo in 1966. He immigrated to the US with his family when he was nine years old. He decided to study psychology and trained in the style of Kung-fu in China and America.

== Career ==
His first role in an Egyptian film was as a mute person in El Agooz Wil Baltagi ("The Old Man and the Thug") (1989), due to his difficulty speaking the Arabic language, as he lived in the US from his childhood until the age of 34.

Mansour became famous in the 1990s for his Egyptian films that relied on martial arts, such as Qabdet El Hilaly ("El Hilaly's Fist") and El Shares ("The Fierce"). In 2001, he presented his last film Badr, which he wrote, produced and directed, and co-starred with Miss Egypt 1999, Angie Abdalla.

Mansour is a fan of American action films. He believes the future of Egypt lies in its ability to promote a new face to revive wilting tourism and an unfavorable international image, instead of ancient civilizations and historical treasures. In 2003, it was revealed that he would produce and star in Triple I, an action-packed drama that revolves around a good-looking rescue team of seven women and three men, who will – following the pattern of such adventure-based shows – chase criminals and save lives. "I loved Baywatch and decided it was a good vehicle to promote many things in modern Egypt, to show beautiful beaches and the reefs, our underwater treasures," Mansour said regarding the series.

== Personal life ==
Mansour has a daughter, Monika Youssef Mansour, who is an athlete and sportswear designer.
