= Lara Debbana =

Egyptian model

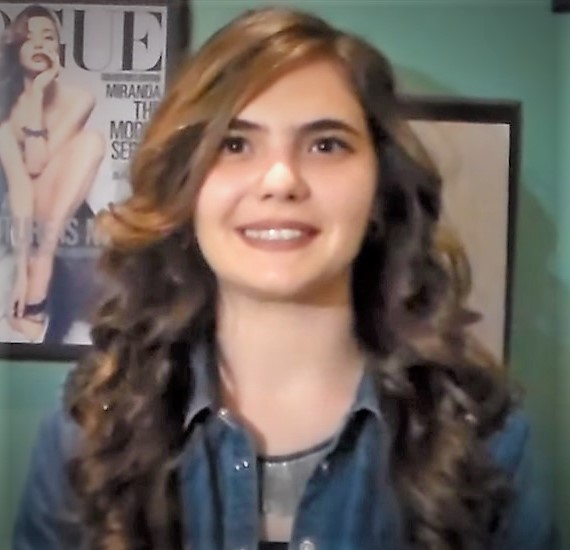
- Height: 1.75 m (5 ft 9 in)
- Beauty pageant titleholder
- Hair color: Brown
- Eye color: Brown
- Major competition: Miss Egypt 2014 (Winner)

Lara Debbane is an Egyptian beauty pageant titleholder who was crowned Miss Egypt 2014 and represented her country at Miss Universe 2014 and Miss World 2015

== Pageantry ==
=== Miss Egypt 2014 ===
Debanne was crowned as Miss Egypt 2014 after the pageant was stopped following the events of the January 25 revolution, and has been the coronation city of Sharm el-Sheikh in Egypt, in the presence of VIPs from Egyptian and international and Egyptian Minister of Tourism. The Miss Egypt Organization in 2014 for the first time invited titleholders of famous beauty pageants to become judges. They were Miss Universe 2009, Stefania Fernandez, Miss Earth 2012, Tereza Fajksová, the reigning Miss Earth 2013, Alyz Henrich and Miss Intercontinental 2013, Ekaterina Plekhova. Lastly, special host with former Miss Egypt 2009, Elham Wagdy and special guests from Egypt, former Miss Egypt 2004 and 2005, Heba El-Sisy and Meriam George and from Tunisia, Wahiba Arres Miss Tunisia 2014.

=== Miss Universe 2014 ===
Debanne competed at Miss Universe 2014, but was unplaced.

=== Miss World 2015 ===
Debanne was due to compete at Miss World 2015 in China but could not attend due to visa issues.

Preceded by Sara El-Khouly	Miss Egypt Universe; 2014	Succeeded by Farah Sedky

Preceded by Amina Ashraf	Miss Egypt World; 2015	Succeeded by Nadeen Osama El Sayed
