= Sunishma Singh =

Fijian climate activist

Sunishma Singh is a climate activist from Fiji. She was also the youth representative from Fiji for COP 25.

== Early life and education ==
Singh lives in Nagroga. She studied at DAV College Suva and continued her education at The University of the South Pacific by taking geospatial science and geography course. She graduated in April 2021.

== Activism ==
When she was 19 years old, she participated in Hibiscus queen with Cal Valley Solar as the sponsor. She is part of Fiji Youth council which is consist of youth from ages 15 to 35 years old who works with Ministry of Youth and Sport as social media co-ordinator. On the event of COP 25, she became one of the youth representatives from Fiji with Apenisa Vaniqi, Stephen Simon, Shivani Karan and Otto Navunicagi.

== Career ==
Currently, she is Resilience officer in United Nations Human Settlements Programme which is located in Lami Town Council.
