= Ramez Movie Star =

TV show

- Ramez Movie Star cover
- Arabic: رامز موفي ستار
- Genre: Comedy; Entertainment; Pranks
- Created by: Ramez Galal
- Presented by: Ramez Galal; Jean-Claude Van Damme
- Country of origin: Saudi Arabia
- Original languages: Arabic; English

Production
- Producer: MBC Group
- Production locations: Riyadh, Saudi Arabia
- Camera setup: Multi-camera

Original release
- Release: April 2 – May 1, 2022

Related
- Ramez Aqlo Tar

Ramez Movie Star (Arabic: رامز موفي ستار, romanized: rɑmez ˈmuːvi stɑː) is a television hidden camera–pranks show presented by Ramez Galal and Jean-Claude Van Damme. The programme was aired in Ramadan 2022 by MBC Group. It is sponsored by the General Entertainment Authority of Saudi Arabia.

== Plot ==
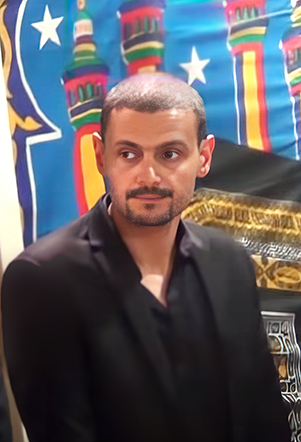
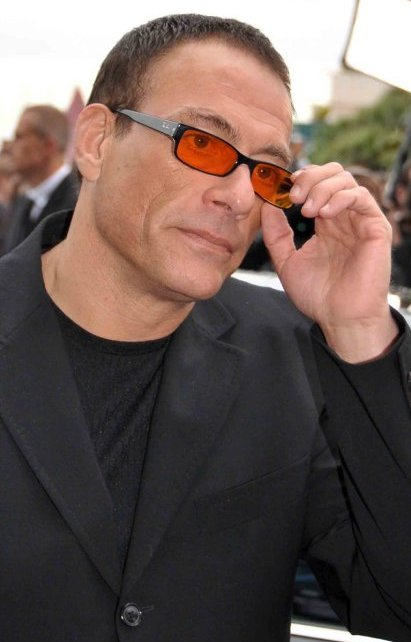
Ramez Galal and Jean-Claude Van Damme represent the show.

The show was shot in Riyadh desert, Saudi Arabia. In the middle of the desert, and in Mad Max: Fury Road (2015) setting, with elements of excitement, suspense and fear. The guest arrives to the show being told that there was a movie in which Jean-Claude Van Damme was starring. Consequently, the guest of the episode assumes that he was chosen to perform one of the scenes.

First of, the guest is interviewed. The show's guest then meets Van Damme to discuss the upcoming scene. The prank starts when the guest gets to the car, which is a convertible Chevrolet Camaro ZL1. The guest is then faced with maniacal high speed, shocking stunts, and a snake priorly planted in the car. Finally, the car stops immediately before it tips into a crocodile infested lake.

The ZL1 convertible Chevrolet is considered to be the fastest Chevrolet convertible ever. Its engine power is equivalent to 580 horsepower.

== Episodes guests ==
This is a list of show guests sorted by date:

No.	The Guest	Original air date	Country	Occupation
1	Sabreen	April 2	Egypt	Actress
2	Yasmine Sabri	April 3	Egypt	Actress
3	Hamo Bika	April 4	Egypt	Singer
4	Hana El Zahed	April 5	Egypt	Actress
5	Ghada Adel	April 6	Egypt	Actress
6	Mohammad Anwar	April 7	Egypt	Actor
7	Rania Youssef	April 8	Egypt	Actress
8	Abdallah Sadhan	April 9	Saudi Arabia	Actor
9	Huda al-Mufti	April 10	Egypt	Actress
10	Ahmad Fathi	April 11	Egypt	Actor
11	Aïcha Ben Ahmed	April 12	Tunisia	Actress
12	Amr El Solia	April 13	Egypt	Footballer
13	Naglaa Badr	April 14	Egypt	Actress, presenter
14	Mayan al-Sayed	April 15	Egypt	Actress
15	Mohammad Mahmoud	April 16	Egypt	Actor
16	Dorra Zarrouk	April 17	Tunisia	Actress
17	Mohamed Sherif	April 18	Egypt	Footballer
18	Tara Emad	April 19	Egypt	Actress
19	Cynthia Khalifeh	April 20	Lebanon	Actress, presenter
20	Soleiman Eid	April 21	Egypt	Actor
21	Salem Al-Dawsari	April 22	Saudi Arabia	Footballer
22	Big Ramy	April 23	Egypt	Bodybuilder
23	Mohamed Tharwat	April 24	Egypt	Actor
24	Badr Benoun	April 25	Morocco	Footballer
25	Amr Youssef	April 26	Egypt	Actor
26	Hassan Abouelrouss	April 27	Egypt	Actor
27	Zizo	April 28	Egypt	Footballer
28	Mayssa Maghrebi	April 29	Morocco	Actress
29	Farida Saif Al-Nasr	April 30	Egypt	Actress
30	Behind-the-scenes	May 1	–	–
