= Mony Helal =

Egyptian model

- Born: 1 May 1992 (age 34); Cairo, Egypt
- Height: 1.74 m (5 ft 9 in)
- Beauty pageant titleholder
- Hair color: Dark hair
- Eye color: Brown
- Major competitions: Miss Egypt 2018 (Winner); Miss World 2018 (Unplaced)

Mony Helal (Arabic: موني هلال) is an Egyptian TV host, content creator and beauty pageant titleholder who was crowned Miss Egypt 2018 and represented her country at Miss World 2018 pageant in China.

== Career ==
Co host in Ramez Galal prank show 2017.

Miss Egypt World 2018.

Modeled in Bilal Saeed & Bloodline Music ft. Muhfaad -Hookah Hookah ( Official Music Video ) 23M views

First Female Arab host/MC in Riyadh season, Saudi Arabia with EAsports ,2019.

Modeled in Diljit Dosanjh - Kylie + Kareena ( Official Music Video ) 29M views

Founder of Enti Boutique 2020.

Hosted The Arab Woman Awards 2020.

Moderated Emirati Women's day 2021 with HH. Sh. Fatima Bint Mubarak at W hotels.

Hosted FIFA Champ with Gamers without borders 2021

Mazaj channel Co-host 2021- Expensive Taste show season 4.

Speaker-Global Women Fashion Forum with HE Princess Sh. Noura Bint Khalifa.

She started her modeling career in 2012. She has been featured in campaigns for beauty brands such as Huda Beauty, Makeup Forever, Mac Cosmetics and She also joined Ramez Galal in his international TV prank show Ramez Taht Al Ard.

=== Pageantry ===
Mony was crowned Miss Egypt in September 2018 and qualified to participate in the 68th Edition of Miss World Pageant scheduled to be held in China (December 2018). She competed at Miss World 2018 pageant but unplaced.
