= Nour El-Semary =

Egyptian actress and model

Nour Elsemary
- Born: September 28, 1982 (age 44); Cairo, Egypt

Nour Elsemary (Arabic: نور السمري; born 28 September 1982, in Cairo) is an Egyptian actress and beauty pageant titleholder.

Elsemary was the official Pantene Miss Egypt 2003 winner. She represented Egypt in Miss Universe 2003. In 2003 she also acted in the TV Series Al Atar Wa Elsabaa Banat (العطار و السبع بنات) with Nour El-Sherif.

Nour currently hosts 'The Bollywood Show' on Nogoum FM, the Largest radio channel in the middle east which is presented in association with MBC Bollywood.

Preceded by Sally Shaheen	Pantene Miss Egypt; 2003	Succeeded by Heba El-Sisy
