= Yara Naoum =

- يارا نعوم
- Born: 1 September 1987 (age 39); Cairo, Egypt
- Height: 1.74 m (5 ft 9 in)
- Beauty pageant titleholder
- Hair color: Brown
- Eye color: Brown
- Major competition: Pantene Miss Egypt 2008

Yara Naoum (Arabic: يارا نعوم, born 1 September 1987 in Cairo, Egypt) is an Egyptian beauty queen. She is married to the Egyptian Football player Emad Moteab. She earned the title of Miss Egypt in 2008.

== Life ==
Naoum was born in Cairo on September 1, 1987. She won the title of Miss Egypt in 2008 and represented Egypt in the Miss World and Miss Universe To date, she has had only one acting role: in the film Hīna Maisara by director Khaled Youssef. She has not appeared on screen since then, as she was occupied with her studies in set design at the Higher Institute of Cinema in Cairo. She is the wife of Egyptian footballer Emad Moteab.

== Legal proceedings ==
Yara Naoum and her mother were brought before the local misdemeanor court in Hurghada in 2021. They were accused of discrimination for denying a babysitter access to a swimming pool. Naoum emphasized that she does not discriminate against anyone and respects all segments of society.

The case ignited a debate about classism within Egyptian society.

Preceded by Ehsan Hatem El Kirdany	Pantene Miss Egypt; 2008	Succeeded by Elham Wajdi Fadel
