= Charlotte Wassef =

Egyptian model

- شارلوت واصف
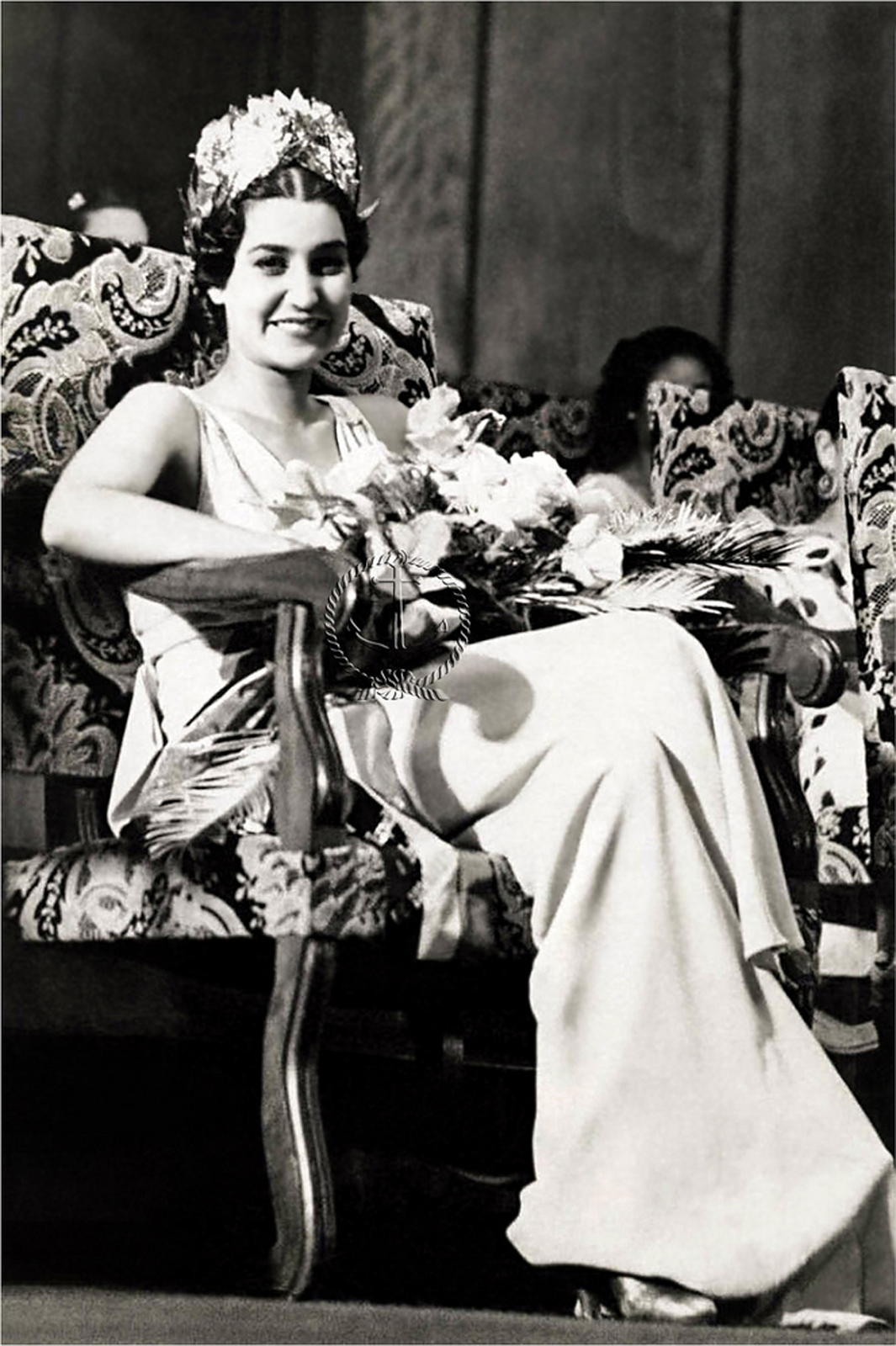
- Charlotte Wassef in 1935
- Born: 15 July 1912; Alexandria, Egypt
- Died: 17 January 1988 (aged 75); Brookfield, Connecticut, United States
- Spouse: Michel Hindi
- Children: 1
- Modeling information
- Hair color: Black
- Eye color: Brown

Charlotte Wassef (Egyptian Arabic: شارلوت واصف; Coptic: ϣⲁⲣⲗⲟⲧ ⲟⲩⲁⲥⲉⲫ; 15 July 1912 – 17 January 1988) was an Egyptian beauty queen and Miss Universe 1935, born in Alexandria to an Egyptian Christian (Coptic) family. She was crowned Miss Egypt in 1934 and also won International Pageant of Pulchritude, the predecessor of Miss Universe, in 1935 in Brussels.
