= Maja Čukić =

Montenegrin model

- Born: Maja Čukić; 26 May 1995 (age 31); Podgorica, Montenegro
- Height: 1.83 m (6 ft 0 in)
- Beauty pageant titleholder
- Title: Miss Universe Montenegro 2015
- Hair color: Brown
- Eye color: Brown
- Major competitions: Miss Montenegro 2014 (1st Runner-Up); Miss Universe 2015 (Unplaced)

Maja Čukić (born 26 May 1995) is a Montenegrin fashion model and beauty pageant titleholder who earned the title of Miss Universe Montenegro 2015 and represented her country at the Miss Universe 2015 pageant.

== Career ==
Čukić used to work at a fashion agency in New York City where she began her career in the fashion industry as a model.

Miss Montenegro 2014

In 2014, Čukić represented Bar at the Miss Montenegro 2014 pageant where she placed as the 1st Runner-Up to the winner, Natasa Novaković, who competed at Miss World 2014 later on.

In late 2014, Čukić was appointed as Miss Universe Montenegro 2015 and competed at the Miss Universe 2015 pageant, marking the country's return after their withdrawal at Miss Universe in 2013 when Nikoleta Jovanović pulled out from the pageant. Montenegro also did not compete the following year at Miss Universe 2014 either.

=== Miss Universe 2015 ===
Čukić represented Montenegro at the Miss Universe 2015 pageant on 20 December 2015. She was one of the candidates who pushed and disrespected the winner, Pia Wurtzbach of the Philippines. She deleted her social media accounts due to the fear of receiving hate from her bashers. Even the Miss Montenegro Organization condemned the attitude she displayed towards Miss Universe 2015. Up to this day, Maja Čukić doesn't have an active project. Brands and producers declined booking her as a model or a talent due to her bad attitude.

Awards and achievements
Preceded by Nikoleta Jovanović	Miss Montenegro; 2014	Succeeded by Katarina Keković
