= Sara El-Khouly =

Egyptian model and beauty queen (born 1988)

- Born: 15 February 1988 (age 38); Cairo, Egypt
- Height: 1.75 m (5 ft 9 in)
- Beauty pageant titleholder
- Title: Miss World Egypt 2010; Miss Mediterranean 2011; Miss Universe Egypt 2011
- Hair color: Dark brown
- Eye color: Brown
- Major competitions: Miss Egypt 2010 (2nd runner-up); Miss World 2010 (Unplaced); Miss Mediterranean 2011 (Winner); Miss Universe 2011 (Unplaced)

Sara El-Khouly (Arabic: سارة الخولي; born February 15, 1988, in Cairo, Egypt) is an Egyptian model and beauty pageant titleholder.

== Early life ==
Sara was born in Cairo, Egypt to an Egyptian father and a Croatian mother and grew up in Dubai, United Arab Emirates.

== Miss Egypt World 2010 ==
Sara was the second runner-up in Miss Egypt 2010 national pageant and was crowned Miss Egypt World 2010 on July 7, 2010, in Cairo. At the time of the coronation, she was a student at the American University of Sharjah. Eventually, on October 20, 2010, she represented her nation at the Miss World 2010 beauty pageant, held in Sanya, China. She did not place among the 25 semi-finalists of the pageant, which was won by Alexandria Mills, representing the United States.

== Miss Mediterranean 2011 ==
On June 4, 2011, Sara represented Egypt at the 2011 Miss Mediterranean pageant held in Nicosia, Cyprus. She beat 14 other contestants to take home the crown and title. This marked the first Egyptian representative to an international pageant after the 2011 Egyptian revolution.

== Miss Universe 2011 ==
Due to the political situation in Egypt, there was no national pageant in 2011. As an experienced beauty pageant contestant, Sara was therefore handpicked as the official Egyptian representative to the 2011 Miss Universe pageant to be held on September 12, 2011, in São Paulo, Brazil.

Preceded by Donia Hamed	Miss Egypt; 2011	Succeeded by Lara Debbane
