= Ramez Wakel el-Gaw =

2015 Egyptian television program

- رامز واكل الجو
- Genre: Comedy, pranks
- Created by: Ramez Galal
- Directed by: Yousif Yasin
- Presented by: Ramez Galal
- Opening theme: Ramez Wakil el-Gaw (by Ramez Galal)
- Countries of origin: Egypt; United Arab Emirates
- No. of episodes: 30 (planned)

Production
- Producer: Middle East Broadcasting Center
- Running time: 23−26 minutes

Original release
- Network: MBC Masr, MBC 1
- Release: June 18 – July 18, 2015

Ramez Wakel el-Gaw ("Ramez in Control") is an Egyptian pranking television program, which aired everyday, through Ramadan 2015, on MBC Masr and MBC 1.

== Background ==
Ramez Galal is a famous Egyptian prankster whose prank TV show episodes are released and watched during Ramadan. In 2011, he starred in Ramez Qalb al-Assad, Ramez, The Desert Fox in 2012, which was highly criticized, Ramez Ankh Amon in 2013 and Ramez, The Sea Shark in 2014. This show, filmed in Dubai, is highly similar to Galal's past prank shows.

== Plot ==
The star gets invited to an opening ceremony of a hotel in Dubai. The host, Shaimaa, convinces the star to get on a plane for a tour in the skies of Dubai, where a masked Ramez Galal is sitting next to them in the plane. He has four different masks of characters, "Fayiq al-Ayiq", "Fathiyya al-Montahiyya", "Bulbul" and a mask that looks like the American actor, Morgan Freeman. The plane's engine stops or gets hijacked and the pilot of the plane orders some of the people on the plane to jump. Being experts at jumping from planes, they do it. Ramez annoys the star in every way possible until the plane lands and everyone gets out of it, where Ramez tells the star that it's a prank.

== Production ==
Waleed bin Ibrahim Al Ibrahim, the owner of Middle East Broadcasting Center (MBC), and Hamdan bin Mohammed Al Maktoum, the crown prince of Dubai, supported the show, spiritually and financially. The show had American makeup experts to make the masks and put them on Ramez and for every episode, they needed three hours to put the mask on him. The plane that the prank happens on is a Spanish Short SC.7 Skyvan with a Czech pilot.

At the end of most of the episodes, the stars either beat Ramez or say cutting words to him or even spit at him. Some of them stayed mad at him and cut their relationship with him, but most of them forgave him and apologized for anything they said or did to him in the end of the episodes. Ramez also appeared in an advertisement for the show, apologizing to the American star, Paris Hilton, and her saying that she will be appearing in an episode of the show. There were mentions of Hilton being paid $50k to do the episode in the show.

== Criticism ==
After the air of the first episode of the show, some agencies and papers started criticizing it. Al Youm Al Sabea criticized the show, calling it: "It is a show that contains fake materials and underestimate the minds of the viewers". They also called the MBC as a company that only cares about the profit of advertisement that comes from all these fake shows. The Ain al-Youm news agency said that the first episodes of the show turned out artificial and weak.
