= Katarina Keković =

Montenegrin model (born 1994)

- Born: Katarina Keković; October 2, 1994 (age 32); Podgorica, FR Yugoslavia
- Height: 1.80 m (5 ft 11 in)
- Beauty pageant titleholder
- Title: Miss World Montenegro 2015
- Hair color: Brown
- Eye color: Brown
- Major competitions: Miss Montenegro 2015 (Miss World Montenegro); Miss World 2016 (Unplaced)

Katarina Keković (born October 2, 1994) is a Montenegrin fashion model and beauty pageant titleholder who was awarded the title of Miss World Montenegro 2015 and represented her Montenegro at the Miss World 2016 pageant. pageant. She began her career as a model and TV host.

== Personal life ==
=== Miss Montenegro 2015 ===
Keković represented Podgorica on September 14, 2015, at the Hotel Palmon Bay in Igalo in the 2015 Miss Montenegro pageant. She was crowned Miss World Montenegro 2015–2016 and competed at the Miss World 2016 pageant.

Awards and achievements
Preceded by Maja Cukic	Miss Montenegro; 2015	Succeeded by Maja Čukić
