= Martial arts film =

Film genre

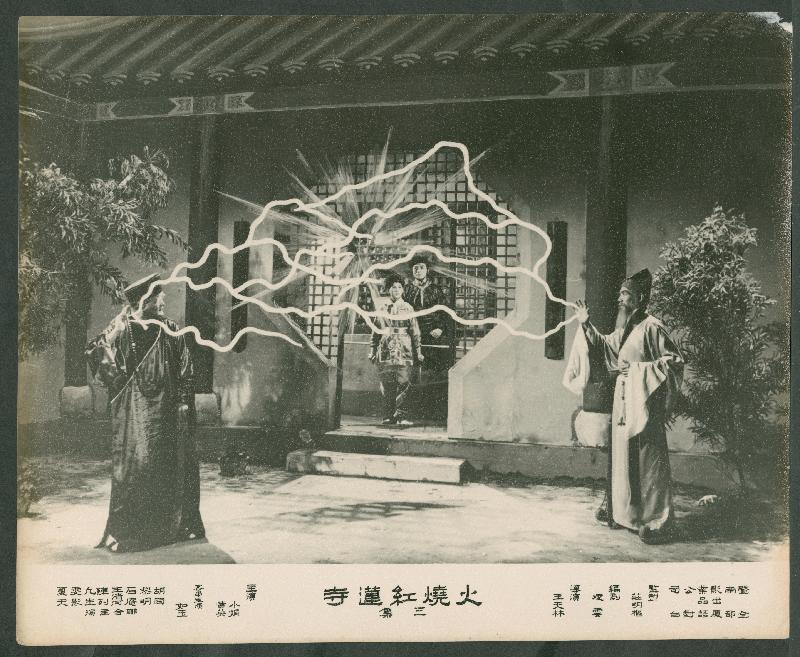
The first martial arts film The Burning of the Red Lotus Temple (1928), a Chinese film directed by Zhang Shichuan

Martial arts films are a sub-genre of action films that feature stylized combat as its primary narrative element and component. Originating within Asian cinema—specifically the wuxia and kung fu traditions of Hong Kong, Taiwan, and China—the genre achieved widespread international distribution and commercial success during the late 20th century. Earlier cinema laid the foundations for the genre through classic swordplay and traditional opera-inspired staging, which transitioned into highly influential 1960s milestones such as King Hu's Come Drink with Me (1966) and Dragon Inn (1967), and Chang Cheh's The One-Armed Swordsman (1967).

The genre's global market expansion began in the early 1970s, driven by Bruce Lee, whose films popularized martial arts internationally. Following Lee, Jackie Chan integrated martial arts with physical comedy and stunt work. Concurrently, the Shaw Brothers Studio and actor Gordon Liu collaborated on Shaolin-themed films, such as The 36th Chamber of Shaolin (1978), which codified the standard training-montage narrative structure. The studio also pioneered a martial arts horror hybrid, blending supernatural elements with action choreography in cult classics like The Legend of the 7 Golden Vampires (1974) and The Boxer's Omen (1983). In the early 1980s, Jet Li rose to prominence in mainland China before transitioning to Hong Kong action cinema, where he spearheaded the representation of wushu and established himself as its most prominent practitioner. Meanwhile, Western cinema began heavily embracing martial arts themes, epitomized by the commercial success of The Karate Kid franchise (beginning in 1984). Concurrently, Belgian-born actor Jean-Claude Van Damme popularized tournament-style plots in Western productions through cult classics like Bloodsport (1988), Kickboxer (1989), Lionheart (1990), and The Quest (1996).

The genre's choreographic techniques heavily influenced mainstream global action cinema through high-profile blockbusters such as The Matrix (1999). This crossover ran parallel to a major global resurgence of modern wuxia films, initiated by Ang Lee's critically acclaimed Crouching Tiger, Hidden Dragon (2000) and followed by major commercial blockbusters such as Hero (2002) and House of Flying Daggers (2004). Prominent Asian martial arts choreographers, most notably Yuen Woo-ping and Corey Yuen, were instrumental in bringing together the filmmaking styles of both Hollywood and Asian cinema.

Outside of East Asian and Western markets, the martial arts genre expanded during the early 1990s through Egyptian productions, notably via actor Youssef Mansour's action films and Mohamed Khan's drama Mr Karate (1993). In Southeast Asia, Thailand expanded physical stunt-work with Prachya Pinkaew's Ong-Bak (2003), which prioritized practical stunts and Muay Thai choreography over digital visual effects. This regional shift continued into Indonesia with Gareth Evans's The Raid (2011), which brought international attention to Pencak silat through long-take, close-quarters combat choreography. Some martial arts films are based on fighting video games, such as the Mortal Kombat, Dead or Alive, Street Fighter, Double Dragon, and Tekken franchises.

== History ==
=== Early films ===
The first Chinese-language martial arts films can be traced to Shanghai cinema of the late 1920s. The first martial arts film was a Chinese film released in 1928, The Burning of the Red Lotus Temple (also translated as "The Burning of the Red Lotus Monastery"), a silent film directed by Chinese film director Zhang Shichuan and produced by the Mingxing Film Company. The film pioneered the martial arts film genre, and was the first kung fu action film ever created. The film is based on the popular Chinese novel The Romance of the Red Lotus Temple, which is set in the Qing dynasty and tells the story of a group of Chinese martial artists who band together to defend their temple from raiders. The film is notable for its action sequences and fight scenes, which were groundbreaking for the time and helped establish the martial arts film genre.

Subsequent films emulated The Burning of the Red Lotus Temple; these films were popular during the period, comprising almost 60% of total Chinese films. Man-Fung Yip stated that these films were "rather tame" by contemporary standards. He wrote that they lacked the kind of dazzling action choreography as expected today and had crude and rudimentary special effects. The early martial-arts films came under increasing attack by both government officials and cultural elites for their allegedly superstitious and anarchistic tendencies, leading them to be banned in 1932. It was not until the base of Chinese commercial filmmaking was relocated from Shanghai to Hong Kong in the late 1940s that martial arts cinema was revived. These films contained much of the characteristics of the previous era. During this period, over 100 films were based on the adventures of real life Cantonese folk hero Wong Fei-hung who first appeared in film in 1949. These films primarily on circuited within Hong Kong and Cantonese-speaking areas of Overseas Chinese. Yip contends that these Hong Kong films still lagged behind the aesthetic and technical standards of films from Japan, the United States, and Europe.

Jujutsu appeared in a variety of Hollywood films of the 1930s, first in G Men (1935) and in other films starring James Cagney, who loved judo. The first Asian to perform a martial art in an American film was Miki Morita in The Awful Truth (1937), followed by Teru Shimada in Tokyo Joe (1949). The fashion of judo in American culture was cut short by World War II.

=== 1950s and 1960s ===
Yip describes Japanese cinema as the most advanced in Asia at the time. This was showcased by the international breakthrough of Akira Kurosawa's films like Rashomon (1950). The film genre known as the chanbara was at its height in Japan. The style was a sub-genre to the jidai-geki, or period drama, with an emphasis on sword fighting and action. It had a similar level of popularity to that of the Western in the United States. The most internationally known films of this era were the Kurosawa films Seven Samurai (1954), The Hidden Fortress (1958), and Yojimbo (1961). Toshiro Mifune starred in many of these films.

By at least the 1950s, Japanese films were looked upon as a model to be emulated by Hong Kong film production, and Hong Kong film companies began actively enlisting professionals from Japan, such as cinematographer Tadashi Nishimoto, to contribute to color and widescreen cinematography. New literary sources also developed in martial arts films of this period, with the xinpai wuxia xiaoshuo (or "new school martial arts fiction") coming into prominence with the success of Liang Yusheng's Longhu Dou Jinghua (1954) and Jin Yong's Shujian enchou lu (1956), which showed influence of the Shanghai martial arts films but also circulated from Hong Kong to Taiwan and Chinese communities overseas. This led to a growing demand in both local and regional markets in the early 1960s and saw a surge in production of Hong Kong martial arts films that went beyond the stories about Wong Fei-hung which were declining in popularity. These new martial arts films featured magical swordplay and higher production values and more sophisticated special effects than the previous films with Shaw Brothers a campaign of "new school" (xinpai) martial arts swordplay films, such as Xu Zenghong's Temple of the Red Lotus (1965) and King Hu's Come Drink with Me (1966).

One of the earliest Hollywood movies to employ the use of martial arts was the 1955 film Bad Day at Black Rock, though the scenes of Spencer Tracy performed barely any realistic fight sequences, but composed mostly of soft knifehand strikes.

Burt Kwouk practiced martial arts in a famous US-British comedy, A Shot in the Dark (1964). The Shaw Brothers began producing Hong Kong kung fu movies beginning with Come Drink with Me (1966). According to The New York Times, in the 1960s Jimmy Wang Yu was "the biggest star of Asian martial arts cinema until the emergence of Bruce Lee." He initially starred in The One-Armed Swordsman (1967).

=== 1970s, 1980s, and 1990s ===
In the US, Tom Laughlin starred in Billy Jack (1971), a film about the anti-war counterculture in which the hero practices hapkido.

In the 1970s, the Hong Kong martial arts films began to grow under the format of yanggang ("staunch masculinity") mostly through the films of Chang Cheh which were popular. This transition led to the kung fu film sub-genre at beginning of the decade and moved beyond the swordplay films with contemporary settings of late Qing or early Republican periods and had more hand-to-hand combat over supernatural swordplay and special effects. A new studio, Golden Harvest quickly became one of independent filmmakers to grant creative freedom and pay and attracted new directors and actors, including Bruce Lee. The popularity of kung fu films and Bruce Lee led to attract a global audience of these films in the United States and Europe, but was cut short on Lee's death in 1973. 1973 was a pivotal year in which kung fu films became mainstream in the United States.

During the 1970s and 1980s, the most visible presence of martial arts films was the hundreds of English-dubbed kung fu and ninja films produced by the Shaw Brothers, Godfrey Ho and other Hong Kong producers. These films were widely broadcast on North American television on weekend timeslots that were often colloquially known as Kung Fu Theater, Black Belt Theater or variations thereof. Inclusive in this list of films are commercial classics like The Big Boss (1971), Drunken Master (1978) and One Armed Boxer (1972). Those films had a large impact on the spread of practice of traditional Chinese and Japanese martial arts in English-speaking countries. Following Lee's death, there were many films starring imitators, sometimes called Brucesploitation. There was some popularity for Japanese karate films starring Sonny Chiba. Beginning with Snake in the Eagle's Shadow (1978), Jackie Chan eventually became the star of Hong Kong action films, though he did not cross over to fame in the United States until the 1990s; Hendrix and Poggiali argues that this led to a split in the martial arts film market:

Asian and American kung fu movies parted ways at this point. In America, kung fu movies raced for the bottom, the rails greased with an endless supply of shoddy Bruceploitation shlock and increasing levels of grimdark ultraviolence. In Hong Kong, an upwardly mobile population, partying under a non-stop money shower thanks to an economic boom, wanted contemporary dramas and their kung fu served with a side of comedy.

Other notable figures in the Chinese kung fu genre include Gordon Liu, Cynthia Rothrock, Jet Li, Sammo Hung, Yuen Biao, Donnie Yen, and Hwang Jang-lee. Sonny Chiba, Etsuko Shihomi, and Hiroyuki Sanada starred in numerous karate and jidaigeki films from Japan during the 1970s and early 1980s. Hollywood has also participated in the genre with actors such as Chuck Norris, Sho Kosugi, Jean-Claude Van Damme, Steven Seagal, Brandon Lee (son of Bruce Lee), Wesley Snipes, Gary Daniels, Mark Dacascos, and Jason Statham.

The Karate Kid (1984), a coming-of-age drama, represented an alternative type of martial arts film that emphasizes humanistic values more than combat.

According to the American Film Institute, the success of Bloodsport (1988), starring Van Damme, helped the resurgence of the martial arts film genre in the United States. According to Van Damme, the film "helped give the martial arts genre a boost but also foretold certain things like the Ultimate Fighting Championship and the idea of pitting different styles against each other."

There was a general decline in the industry, until it was revived close to the 2000s. The Matrix (1999), whose fight scenes were choreographed by Hong Kong fight choreographer Yuen Woo-ping, is considered revolutionary in American cinema for raising the standard of fight scenes in Western cinema.

=== 21st century ===
Crouching Tiger, Hidden Dragon (2000), a critical and financial success, restored prestige to martial arts films. In the 2000s, Thailand's film industry became an international force in the genre with the films of Tony Jaa and the cinema of Vietnam followed suit with The Rebel (2007) and Clash (2009). In more recent years, the Indonesian film industry has offered Merantau (2009) and The Raid: Redemption (2011).

The Middle East has also participated in the genre with actors such as Youssef Mansour who became famous in the 1990s for his Egyptian films that relied on martial arts.

Women have also played key roles in the genre, including such actresses as Cheng Pei-pei, Michelle Yeoh, Angela Mao, Zhang Ziyi, Josephine Siao, Cynthia Rothrock, and Kuo Hsiao-Chuang. In addition, western animation has ventured into the genre with the most successful effort being the internationally hailed DreamWorks Animation film franchise Kung Fu Panda, starring Jack Black and Angelina Jolie.

== Subgenres ==
In the Chinese-speaking world, martial arts films are commonly divided into two subcategories: the wuxia period films (武俠片), and the more modern kung fu films (功夫片, best epitomized in the films of Bruce Lee). However, according to Hong Kong film director, producer, and movie writer Ronny Yu, wuxia movies are not to be confused with martial arts movies.

Kung fu films are a significant movie genre in themselves. Like westerns for Americans, they have become an identity of Chinese cinema. As the most prestigious movie type in Chinese film history, kung fu movies were among the first Chinese films produced and the wuxia period films (武俠片) are the original form of Chinese kung fu films. The wuxia period films came into vogue due to the thousands of years popularity of wuxia novels (武俠小說). For example, the wuxia novels of Jin Yong and Gu Long directly led to the prevalence of wuxia period films. Outside of the Chinese speaking world the most famous wuxia film made was the Ang Lee film Crouching Tiger, Hidden Dragon (2000), which was based on the Wang Dulu series of wuxia novels: it earned four Academy Awards, including one for Best Foreign Film.

Martial arts westerns are usually American films inexpensively filmed in Southwestern United States locations, transposing martial arts themes into an "old west" setting; e.g., Red Sun with Charles Bronson and Toshiro Mifune.

== See also ==
- Action fiction
- Combat in film
- List of martial arts films
- List of mixed martial arts films
- Orange Sky Golden Harvest
- Samurai cinema
- Wuxia

== Bibliography ==
- Corcoran, John (1992). The Martial Arts Companion: Culture, History, and Enlightenment. Mallard Press. ISBN 0-7924-5762-5.
- Hendrix, Grady; Poggiali, Chris (2021). These Fists Break Bricks: How Kung Fu Movies Swept America and Changed the World. Mondo Books. ISBN 978-1-7368916-0-5.
- Sharpe, Jasper (2011). Historical Dictionary of Japanese Cinema. Scarecrow Press. ISBN 978-0-8108-7541-8.
- Yip, Man-Fung (2017). Martial Arts Cinema and Hong Kong Modernity. Hong Kong University Press. ISBN 978-988-8390-71-7.
