= Pooja Priyanka =

- Born: May 23, 1991 (age 35); Lautoka, Fiji
- Citizenship: Fiji; Australia
- Occupations: Beauty Pageant Titleholder; Fashion Model; Actor; Dancer
- Organization: Miss World Organisation

Pooja Priyanka (born 23 May 1991) is a Fijian-Indian actress, model, dancer, entrepreneur and beauty pageant titleholder. She holds the Miss World Fiji 2016 Pageant title and debuted in Bollywood by landing a role in a short film, "The Dream Catcher", with Dharmendra.

== Career ==
Priyanka started her career when she was 18 years old by competing for local beauty pageants. She subsequently won many titles due to her strong talent performances in dancing. In 2016, Pooja competed and won the Miss World Fiji title amongst nine other candidates. This victory led her to represent her country at the 66th Miss World Pageant in Washington DC, where she was amongst the top 20 finalists.

Priyanka has been training in Indian traditional dance forms since she was five years old. She is the co-founder and creator of ViDesi Girls, a Bollywood dance company based in Australia. She has her own fashion label ViDesi as well as a co-founder of jewellery brand PaperPeonies. In 2016, it was announced that Pooja Priyanka will be the brand ambassador for Fiji International.

In 2017, Priyanka debuted in Bollywood by landing a role in a short film with Dharmendra for The Dream Catcher. This movie has been nominated for international film festivals around the world.

== Pageantry ==
=== Miss World Fiji 2016 ===
Priyanka was crowned Miss World Fiji 2016 on 7 May 2016 in the ballroom at the Grand Pacific Hotel in Suva and competed at Miss World 2016 on 18 December 2016 in Washington, D.C., United States.

=== Miss World 2016 ===
Priyanka represented Fiji at Miss World 2016 and placed Top 20 for Talent and Beauty with a purpose.
