= Mohra Tantawy =

Egyptian model

- Born: 25 October 2001 (age 24); Cairo, Egypt
- Occupation: Model
- Height: 1.70 m (5 ft 7 in)
- Beauty pageant titleholder
- Title: Miss Universe Egypt 2023
- Major competitions: Miss Universe Egypt 2023 (Winner); Miss Universe 2023 (Unplaced); Miss Intercontinental Egypt (Winner)
- Website: www.instagram.com/mohratantawy

Mohra Tantawy (Arabic: مهره طنطاوى; born 25 October 2001) is an Egyptian model and beauty pageant titleholder who was crowned Miss Universe Egypt 2023. She represented Egypt at the Miss Universe 2023 competition in El Salvador.

== Background ==
=== Early life ===
Tantawy was born in Cairo, the capital of Egypt. She graduated in business and marketing. As an activist, she campaigns for women's rights for equality through education.

== Pageantry ==
Tantawy represented Egypt at the Miss Universe 2023 in El Salvador on November 18, 2023 and was unplaced.

Awards and achievements
Preceded by Diana Hamed	Miss Egypt; 2023	Succeeded by Logina Salah
