= Donia Hamed =

Egyptian model

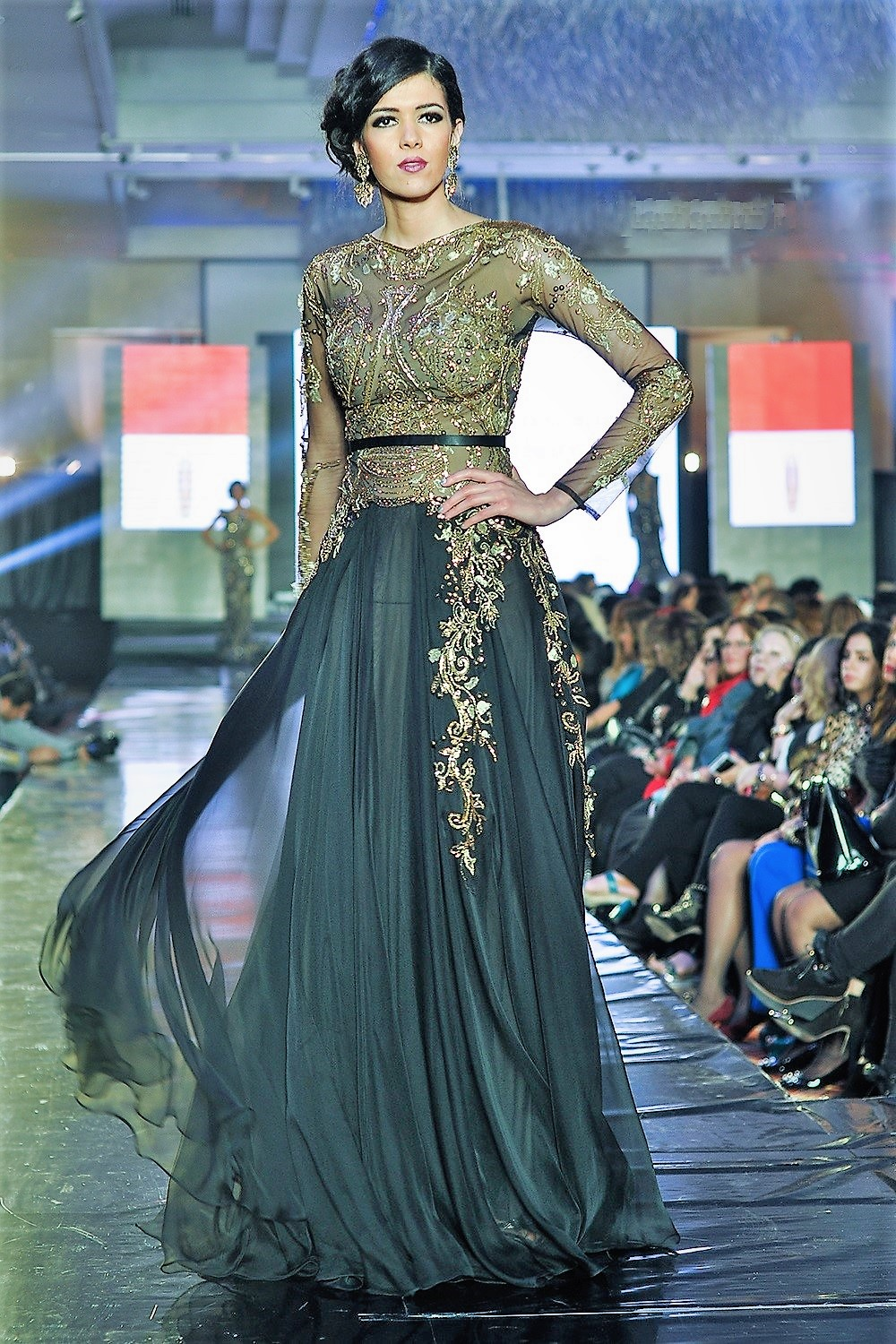
- Hamed modeling Hany ElBehairy Haute Couture in 2014
- Born: Cairo, Egypt
- Height: 1.79 m (5 ft 10 in)
- Beauty pageant titleholder
- Hair color: Black
- Eye color: Dark brown
- Major competition: Miss Egypt 2010 (winner)

Donia Hamed (Arabic: دنيا حامد) is an Egyptian model and beauty pageant titleholder. She was crowned Miss Egypt Universe 2010 and competed at Miss Universe 2010 and Miss World 2011, but remained unplaced at both events. She has another career in the stock market.

Preceded by Elham Wagdy	Miss Egypt; 2010	Succeeded by Sara El-Khouly
