= Camila Estico =

Seychellois model and beauty pageant titleholder

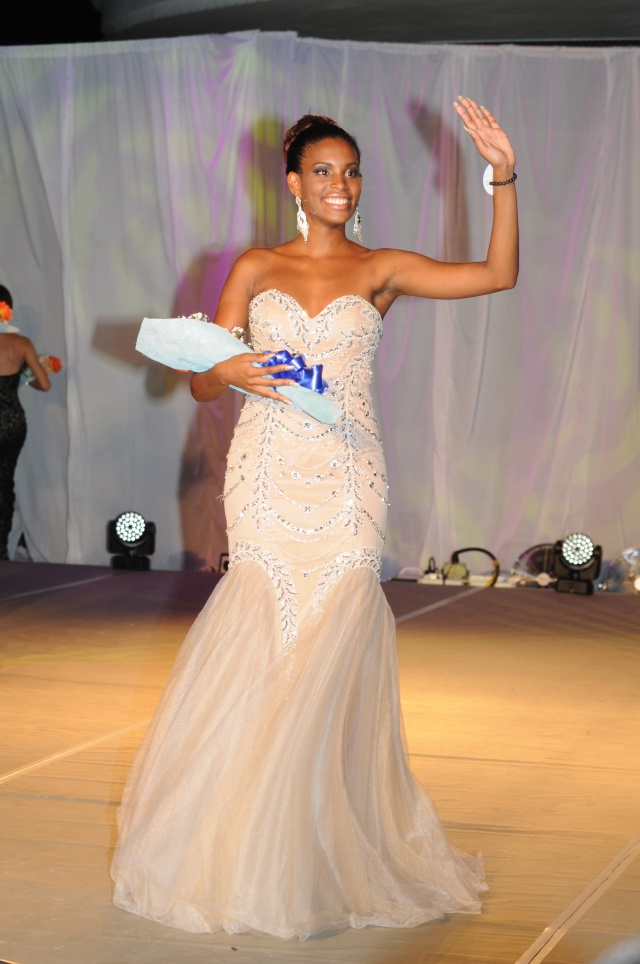
- Estico waving after being crowned Miss Seychelles 2014
- Born: Camila Estico; 1992 (age 33–34)
- Education: Hillsborough Community College
- Occupation: Model
- Height: 163 cm (64 in)
- Beauty pageant titleholder
- Title: Miss Seychelles 2014
- Years active: 2007–present
- Hair color: Black
- Major competition: Miss World 2014 (unplaced)

Camila Estico (born c. 1992) is a Seychellois model and beauty pageant titleholder. She won the 2014 edition of Miss Seychelles, earning her the right to represent Seychelles at Miss World 2014.

== Early life ==
Camila was born to a Cuban mother and Seychellois father. She grew up on the island of Seychelles until she turned 14 years of age and later she and her family moved to the United States of America. There, at Tampa, Florida, she attended Howard W. Baker Performing Arts High School until 2009. After a semester break she went to the New York City where she took a two-year program at the Alvin Ailey Dance School. As soon as she came back from here New York trip she returned to Florida to pursue an Associate of Arts in Business Administration at the Hillsborough Community College. She returned to her homeland after 9 years of being an American.

== Pageantry ==
=== Miss Seychelles 2014 ===
On 1 June 2014, she was crowned winner of Miss Seychelles 2014 by Agnes Gerry at a grand ceremony at Savoy Resort and Spa, Seychelles. At the same pageant she won Miss Talent and Miss Photogenic.

=== Miss World 2014 ===
Estico represented Seychelles at Miss World 2014, reaching the talent competition quarter-finals.

=== Acting career ===
Camila Estico is one of the actresses in A Love Like This, a movie which was shot on both Seychelles and Sri Lanka.

Awards and achievements
Preceded by Agnes Gerry	Miss Seychelles; 2014	Succeeded by Linne Freminot
