= Antoinette Delali Kemavor =

Ghanaian Beauty Queen/ model

Antoinette Kemavor
- Born: Antoinette Delali Kemavor
- Beauty pageant titleholder
- Title: Miss World Ghana 2015
- Hair color: black
- Eye color: brown
- Major competitions: Miss World Ghana 2015 (Winner); Miss World 2016 (Top 20)

Antoinette Delali Kemavor is a Ghanaian model and beauty pageant titleholder who was crowned Miss World Ghana in 2015 and represented Ghana at the Miss World 2016 pageant. She has been spotted in countless music videos, and TV commercials.

== Personal life ==
=== Miss World Ghana 2015 ===
Antoinette was crowned Miss World Ghana in 2015. As Miss World Ghana 2015, she competed at the Miss World 2016 pageant.

=== Miss World 2016 ===
Antoinette represented Ghana at Miss World 2016 pageant where she placed Top 20.
