= Christine Barbier =

Seychellois model and beauty pageant title holder

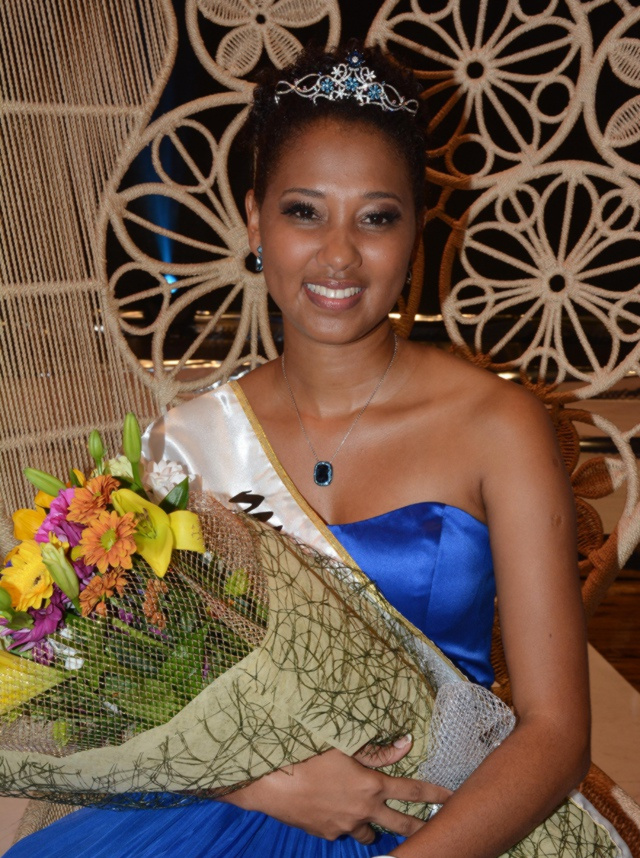
- Born: Christine Barbier; 1992 (age 33–34); Cascade, Mahé, Seychelles
- Height: 1.83 m (6 ft 0 in)
- Beauty pageant titleholder
- Title: Miss Seychelles 2016
- Hair color: Black
- Eye color: White
- Major competitions: Miss Seychelles 2016 (Winner); Miss World 2016 (Unplaced)

Christine Barbier (born 1992) is a Seychellois model and beauty pageant title holder who was crowned winner of Miss Seychelles 2016.

== Life ==
Barbier was born in the Cascade administrative district of Mahé. She is an alumna of the Seychelles Tourism Academy where she studied tourism and tour guiding. She works as an accounts assistant at Mason's Exchange in Victoria.

== Pageantry ==
=== Miss Seychelles 2016 ===
Barbier contested at the 2016 edition of Miss Seychelles and was crowned winner of the competition on 28 May 2016 at the International Conference Centre of Seychelles. She represented Seychelles at Miss World 2016 in the United States.

Awards and achievements
Preceded by Linne Freminot	Miss Seychelles; 2016	Incumbent
