= Ramez Level Al-Wahsh =

- Genre: Prank, Entertainment
- Created by: General Entertainment Authority, MBC Group
- Presented by: Ramez Galal
- Starring: Ramez Galal
- Country of origin: Egypt
- Original language: Arabic

Production
- Production locations: Riyadh, Saudi Arabia

Original release
- Network: MBC Group

Ramez Level Al-Wahsh is an Egyptian television program presented by the artist Ramez Galal, scheduled to be shown during Ramadan in 2026 on MBC Masr.

== Premise ==
The program is a prank show, based around placing public figures in unexpected situations within a pre-prepared acting framework, with the aim of recording their reactions on a hidden camera.

== Production ==
MBC Egypt announced that the program was included in its programming schedule for Ramadan 2026, and would be broadcast every day during the month.
