= Sarah Shaheen =

Egyptian model

- Born: Egypt
- Spouse: Amr Waked (m. 2015)
- Beauty pageant titleholder
- Title: Miss Egypt 2001
- Hair color: Black
- Eye color: Hazel
- Major competitions: Miss Egypt 2001 (Winner); Miss Universe 2001 (Unplaced)

Sarah Shaheen (Arabic: سارة شاهين [ˈsɑːɾɑ ʃæˈhiːn]) is an Egyptian-Canadian model and beauty pageant titleholder who was crowned Miss Egypt 2001 and represented her country at Miss Universe 2001 but was unplaced.

== Career ==
Shaheen started her career as an interior designer in El Gouna, working for Orascom Hotels & Development, on projects like La Maison Bleu and El Gouna Yacht Club.

== Personal life ==
Shaheen has been married to actor Amr Waked since 2015.

Preceded by Ranea El Sayed	Miss Egypt; 2001	Succeeded by Sally Shaheen
