= Miss Montenegro =

Beauty contest

Mis Crne Gore
- Formation: 2006
- Type: Beauty pageant
- Headquarters: Podgorica
- Location: Montenegro
- Members: Miss Universe; Miss World
- Official language: Montenegrin
- President: Vesna de Vinča
- Website: www.missyu.rs

Miss Montenegro (Montenegrin: Mis Crne Gore) is a national beauty pageant in Montenegro.

== History ==
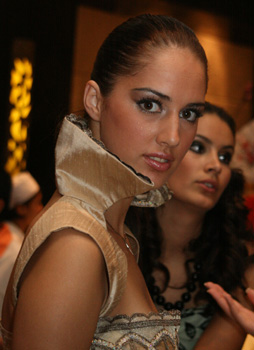
Marija Ćirović, Miss Montenegro 2007

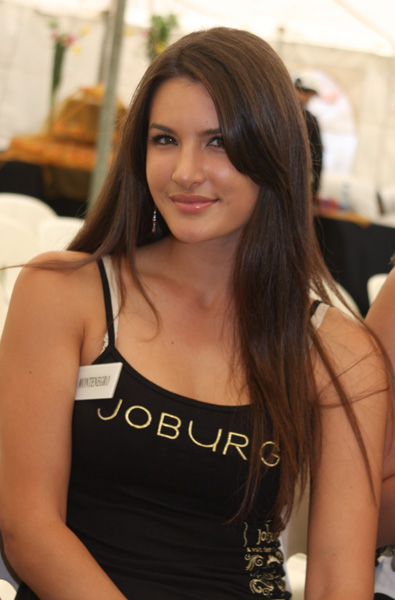
Mariana Mihajlović, Miss Montenegro 2008

Prior to the birth of Miss Montenegro in late 2006, Ivana Knežević was handpicked to become the first official international representative of Montenegro as an independent state to Miss World 2006, after the union of Serbia and Montenegro came to an end on 3 June 2006. Ivana was a Montenegrin finalist in the last Miss Serbia and Montenegro ever held, won by Serbian Vedrana Grbović in 2006.

== President ==
Vesna de Vinča president of Miss Montenegro is a TV author, journalist, TV director, editor, and screenwriter. Since 1993, she has been the TV programme editor on the documentary programme, RTS, the biggest radio and TV network in Serbia & Montenegro. Her TV programs are broadcast via satellite. She has been running her own TV production company since 2004.

== Titleholders ==
=== Miss Montenegro ===
The following is a list of winners. From 2006 to present.

Year	Miss Montenegro	Municipality
2006	Ivana Knežević	Bar
2007	Marija Ćirović	Nikšić
2008	Mariana Mihajlović	Plavnica
2009	Marijana Pokrajac	Kotor
2010	Milica Milatović	Podgorica
2011	Maja Maraš	Podgorica
2012	Nikolina Lončar	Pljevlja
2013	Ivana Milojko	Kotor
2014	Nataša Novaković	Podgorica
2015	Nataša Milosavljević	Herceg Novi
2016	Katarina Keković	Cetinje
2017	Tea Babić	Podgorica
2018	Natalija Glušcević	Podgorica
2019	Mirjana Muratović	Podgorica
2021	Natalija Labović	Berane
2023	Anđela Vukadinović	Kotor
2025	Andrea Nikolić	Podgorica

=== Miss Universe Montenegro ===
Began 2024, the Miss Universe Montenegro held independently and the program joined with Miss Universe Albania Organization LIVE on MCN TV (Eduart Dedaj directorship).

Year	Miss Universe Montenegro	Municipality
2024	Rumina Ivezaj	Tuzi

== Big Four pageants representatives ==
=== Miss Universe Montenegro ===
- : Declared as Winner
- : Ended as runner-up or top 5/6 qualification
- : Ended as one of the finalists or semifinalists
- : Ended as special awards winner

Year	Municipality	Miss Montenegro	Placement at Miss Universe	Special awards	Notes
Eduart Dedaj directorship — a franchise holder to Miss Universe from 2024
2026	Tuzi	Aleksandra Ivezaj	TBA	TBA	
2025	Did not compete				
2024	Tuzi	Rumina Ivezaj	Unplaced		
Vesna de Vinča directorship — a franchise holder to Miss Universe between 2007―2015; between 2016 and 2018 Miss Universe Montenegro did not come to Miss Universe, due to license matter. Miss Montenegro did not extend the license since 2016.
Did not compete between 2015—2023
2018	Budva	Verica Qimee	Did not compete		Withdrew at Miss Universe after the official confirmation did not present; Verica selected as Miss Montenegro by another agency
2017	Bar	Adela Zoranić	Did not compete		
2016	Cetinje	Katarina Keković	Did not compete		Withdrew at Miss Universe after the official Miss Montenegro postponed; in 2016 Miss Universe Montenegro allocated to Miss World 2016 in the United States
2015	Podgorica	Maja Čukić	Unplaced		
2014	Bar	Nikoleta Jovanović	Did not compete		
Did not compete in 2013
2012	Podgorica	Andrea Radonjić	Unplaced		
2011	Pljevlja	Nikolina Lončar	Unplaced	Miss Congeniality	
Did not compete in 2010
2009	Podgorica	Anja Jovanović	Unplaced		
2008	Nikšić	Daša Živković	Unplaced		Daša was 2nd Runner-up at Miss Tourism Queen International 2008
2007	Podgorica	Snežana Bušković	Unplaced		

=== Miss World Montenegro ===
- : Declared as Winner
- : Ended as runner-up or top 5/6 qualification
- : Ended as one of the finalists or semifinalists
- : Ended as special awards winner

Year	Municipality	Miss Montenegro	Placement at Miss World	Special awards	Notes
Vesna de Vinča directorship — a franchise holder to Miss Universe from 2006
2026	Cetinje	Maša Vukićević	Unplaced		
2025	Podgorica	Andrea Nikolić	Top 40	Multimedia Challenge Winner	
Miss World 2023 was rescheduled to 2024 due to the change of host and when entering India as the new host, there were several issues that caused the postponement until March 2024.
2023	Podgorica	Anđela Vukadinović	Unplaced		
Miss World 2021 was rescheduled to 16 March 2022 due to the COVID-19 pandemic outbreak in Puerto Rico, no edition started in 2022.
2021	Berane	Natalija Labovic	Did not compete		
Due to the impact of COVID-19 pandemic, no competition held in 2020
2019	Podgorica	Mirjana Muratović	Unplaced	Miss World Top Model (Top 40)	
2018	Podgorica	Natalija Glušcević	Unplaced		
2017	Podgorica	Tea Babić	Unplaced		
2016	Cetinje	Katarina Keković	Unplaced		
2015	Herceg Novi	Nataša Milosavljević	Unplaced		
2014	Podgorica	Nataša Novaković	Unplaced		
2013	Kotor	Ivana Milojko	Unplaced		
2012	Pljevlja	Nikolina Lončar	Unplaced		
2011	Podgorica	Maja Maraš	Unplaced		
2010	Podgorica	Milica Milatović	Unplaced		
2009	Kotor	Marijana Pokrajac	Unplaced		
2008	Plavnica	Mariana Mihajlović	Unplaced		
2007	Nikšić	Marija Ćirović	Unplaced		
2006	Bar	Ivana Knežević	Unplaced		

== See also ==
- Miss Serbia
