= Andrea Radonjić =

Montenegrin beauty pageant titleholder (born 1992)

- Born: Andrea Radonjić; 13 December 1992 (age 33); Podgorica, Montenegro (then Federal Republic of Yugoslavia)
- Height: 1.76 m (5 ft 9 1/2 in)
- Beauty pageant titleholder
- Title: Miss Montenegro 2011
- Hair color: Brown
- Eye color: Green
- Major competitions: Miss Montenegro Universe 2011 (Winner); Miss Tourism Queen International 2011; Miss Universe 2012

Andrea Radonjić (born 13 December 1992) is a Montenegrin beauty pageant titleholder who was crowned Miss Montenegro Universe 2011 and represented her country in the 2012 Miss Universe.

== Miss Montenegro 2011 & Miss Universe 2012 ==
Miss Montenegro 2011 beauty pageant was held at the Hotel Mediterranean in Becici on 25 August 2011. Fifteen beauties were selected to prepare a stay in the Mediterranean. Radonjić from Podgorica was crowned Miss Montenegro 2011. She represented Montenegro in the Miss Universe 2012 beauty pageant.

In 2013, she competed for Miss Zeta River.

Awards and achievements
Preceded by Nikolina Lončar	Miss Montenegro; 2011	Succeeded by Nikoleta Jovanović
