= Vesna de Vinča =

Serbian journalist

- Born: Vesna Jugović; 1957 (age 68–69); Belgrade, Yugoslavia
- Occupations: Television author, producer, journalist, writer

Vesna De Vinča (born Vesna Jugović, Serbian: Весна Југовић / Весна де Винча; 1957) is a Serbian television author, journalist, writer, director, and film and event producer.

== Biography ==
Since 1993, de Vinča has been the television program editor for the documentary program of the Serbian state TV network Radio Television of Serbia. Her television programs have been broadcast via RTS satellite, RTV Pink, and on BN TV and BN TV satellite in Bosnia and Herzegovina.

Since 2004 she has run a private company called De Vinca Production. She is the author of the book, Mandela's Code. From 2006, De Vinča was jury member on the ÉCU The European Independent Film Festival.

== Education ==
She received her Ph.D. in communication from Megatrend University. Her doctoral thesis was entitled Exclusive TV Journalism. She also has a master's degree in economics from the University of Belgrade.

== Interviews and documentaries ==
The television series Top Encounters (1993–2011) is a documentary program that features De Vinca interviewing notable people. Some of her guests on the program were Nelson Mandela, Elisabeth Murdoch, Muammar Gaddafi, Arthur C. Clarke, Paco Rabanne, Yassar Arafat, Simon Wiesenthal, Sirimavo Bandaranaike, Pablo Raptis, and Gina Lollobrigida.

De Vinca made other documentaries and short films including Hasid's Song, Tenge Njenge, Angels wear Prada, Serbia the Land of Roman Emperors, and The Cross of the Holy Land.

== Other activities ==
de Vinča is the creator of the "Serbia, the Land of Lilacs" project, established in 2007, and supported by royal families from Europe. Working with the Military and Hospitaller Order of Saint Lazarus of Jerusalem, she donated medical equipment to hospitals in Kraljevo and Slankamen in Serbia.

"Belgrade Calling! Save Christmas trees!" was an action supported by Mensa, the Olympic Committee of Serbia, and European Rotaract to save more than 2,000 trees.

As a general producer, de Vinca produced the Fashion Week in Greece in Thessalonica in 2007, 2008, and 2009, and Balkan Beauty Ambassador international events in Porto Carras in Greece, working with FASHION TV.

Vesna de Vinča is the author and producer of Serbia Fashion Day, a Serbian brand promoting Serbian designers, culture and fashion.

She is the president of the Miss Serbia and Miss Montenegro organizations and owner of licences for Miss World from owner Julia Morley and Miss Universe from owner Donald Trump.
