= Nadeen Osama El Sayed =

Egyptian model

- Born: 21 August 1998 (age 28); Cairo, Egypt
- Other name: Nadeen Osama
- Height: 1.74 m (5 ft 9 in)
- Beauty pageant titleholder
- Hair color: Dark Brown
- Eye color: Black
- Major competitions: Miss Egypt 2016 (Winner); Miss World 2016 (Unplaced)
- Website: https://instagram.com/nadeenosamaa

Nadeen Osama El Sayed (Arabic: نادين أسامة السيد pronounced [næˈdiːn ʔoˈsæːmæ (ʔe)sˈsæj.jed]) is an Egyptian model and beauty pageant titleholder who was crowned Miss Egypt 2016 and She represented Egypt at Miss World 2016 pageant in the United States.

== Early life ==
Nadeen Osama El Sayed was born in Cairo. She graduated last year from Nermein Ismael American school "NIAS" and now studies Business Administration at The British University in Egypt. She grew up with two sisters, Merna, the oldest and Reem, the youngest. She also has another baby sister.

== Pageantry ==
=== Miss Egypt 2016 ===
Nadeen was crowned Miss Egypt 2016 on 18 September 2016. As Miss Egypt World 2016.

=== Miss World 2016 ===
Nadeen represented Egypt in the Miss World 2016 pageant but Unplaced.

Awards and achievements
| Preceded by Lara Debbana | Miss Egypt World; 2016 | Succeeded by Farah Shabaan |
