= Rania Youssef =

Egyptian actress (born 1973)

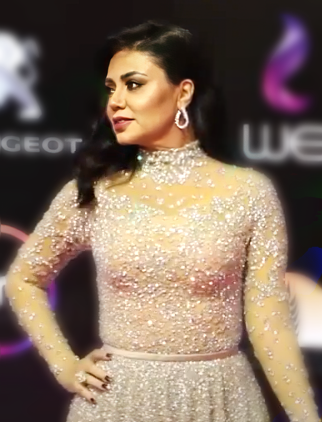
- Born: رانيا سيد محمد السيد يوسف; 1 December 1973 (age 52); Cairo, Egypt
- Education: Cairo University
- Occupation: actress
- Years active: 1993–present

Rania Youssef (born 1 December 1973) is an Egyptian actress. She began her career as a model when she competed for Miss Egypt. She made a notable television comeback when she landed the role of Dalal (Dida), Farah's mother, in the American television series Miss Farah (2019–2022), a remake of the television series Jane the Virgin (2014–2019).

== Biography ==
Rania Youssef was born in Cairo, Egypt, to an officer father and a flight attendant mother. She identifies strongly with her character "Dida" in the series Miss Farah, who is also a young single mother raising her daughter alone. She studied English literature at Cairo University.

In 1997, she competed for the title of Miss Egypt where she finished as runner-up. She took her jobs as an actress in commercials as well as a model for photographers.

In March 2018, she was chosen as a member of the jury for the Sharm el-Sheikh Film Festival, one of the biggest festivals in Egypt, a jury chaired by Swedish film critic Eva Girstam.

On 29 November 2018, at the closing ceremony of the Cairo Film Festival, she wore a dress that revealed her legs, which led to a lawsuit filed against her by two Egyptian lawyers, Amrou Abdessalam and Samir Sabri, for "inciting debauchery". The outfit was described as a "black leotard covered by a transparent overdress with criss-cross detailing and a large bow belt". The latter told Agence France-Presse; "Rania Youssef's appearance is contrary to the traditions, values, and morals of society, and it has harmed the festival and the image of Egyptian women". The affair provoked an international outcry, and Rania Youssef publicly apologized on her Instagram account for wearing the dress. On 5 December, the charges were dropped after his public apology.

== Personal life ==
Despite numerous rumors over the years, she regularly says that her ex-husband, director Mohamed Mokhtar supported her career choices, even the most controversial ones. They divorced in 2011.

=== Notable television comeback ===
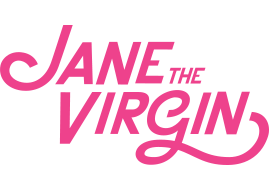
Logo of the television series Jane the Virgin which Miss Farah was based on.

In 2019, Rania Youssef signed on for the role of Dalal, the mother of the main character in the American series Miss Farah, which has been broadcast in France since 19 April 2020 on the Téva channel and rebroadcast free-to-air since 18 July 2021 on 6ter. The show starts on 29 December 2019 on the MBC4 channel and is very well received by critics.

The wacky comedy series is adapted from the remake of the television series Jane the Virgin, based on a Venezuelan telenovela, Juana la Virgen, it depicts the tortured life of Jane Villanueva, a young woman who accidentally undergoes artificial insemination and must then deal with this unexpected pregnancy.

In 2021, that year, critics praised her performance in the fourth season of Miss Farah, her character being afflicted with cancer.

In 2022, Miss Farah ended after five seasons and one hundred and ten episodes.

== Filmography ==
=== Television ===
- 2019 - 2022: Miss Farah (الآنسة فرح) : Dalal (Dida) (main role - 110 episodes)
- 2020: Ahwak (Al Anisa Farah) from Abu
- 2016: Al Farah (Ya Bakhta Biya) (Al Anisa Farah) by Asmaa Abulyazeid and Mohammed Al Kilany
- 2020: Ya Lil (Al Anisa Farah) from Ramage
