= Meriam George =

Egyptian model (born 1987)

- Born: Meriam George; 30 May 1987 (age 39); Cairo, Egypt
- Height: 1.75 m (5 ft 9 in)
- Beauty pageant titleholder
- Title: Pantene Miss Egypt 2005
- Hair color: Brown
- Eye color: Brown
- Major competitions: Miss Universe 2005; (Unplaced); Miss Intercontinental 2005; (Top 16); Miss Earth 2006; (Top 8); Miss Supertalent 2013; (1st Runner-Up)

Meriam George (Arabic: مريم چورچ, IPA: [ˈmeɾjæm ˈʒoɾʒ]; born 30 May 1987 in Cairo, Egypt) is an Egyptian model and beauty pageant titleholder.

== Career ==
At the age of eighteen, she was the official Pantene Miss Egypt 2005 winner. She represented Egypt in Miss Universe 2005, Miss Intercontinental 2005 and Miss Earth 2006. She was among the eight finalists in Miss Earth, a semifinalist in Miss Intercontinental, and did not place in Miss Universe. In October 2013, she traveled to Seoul, South Korea, to represent her country as "Miss Egypt" at the Miss Supertalent of the World 2013, where she placed as first runner-up, Egypt's best showing in the grand slam pageants since Antigone Costanda was Miss World in 1954.

== Personal life ==
She is a Coptic Christian.

Preceded by Heba El-Sisy	Miss Egypt; 2005	Succeeded by Fawzia Mohamed

Preceded by Elham Wagdy	Miss Egypt Earth; 2006	Succeeded by Doa Hakam El Mal
