= Pierina Wong =

Peruvian beauty pageant titleholder (born 1990)

Pierina Sue Wong Mori is a Peruvian model and beauty pageant titleholder who won the 2016 edition of Miss Peru. She represented her country at the Miss World 2016 pageant, but did not enter the finals.

== Pageantry ==
At 23 years of age, Wong competed in the 2013 edition of Miss Perú Tusán|es, held on October 26, 2013, in the city of Lima. She won the contest and was crowned by the outgoing titleholder, Andrea Paz.

On December 5, 2015, Wong represented the department of Lambayeque in the national Miss World Peru 2016 contest, held at the Plaza de Armas of Trujillo. She won the title and was crowned by the outgoing titleholder, Karla Chocano.

Awards and achievements
Preceded by Karla Chocano	Miss World Peru; 2016	Succeeded by Pamela Sanchez
