= Maja Maraš =

Montenegrin beauty pageant contestant (born 1991)

- Born: Maja Maraš; 1991 (age 34–35); Cetinje, Yugoslavia
- Height: 1.75 m (5 ft 9 in)
- Beauty pageant titleholder
- Title: Miss Crne Gore 2011
- Major competitions: Miss Montenegro 2011 (winner), Miss World 2011

Maja Maraš (born 1991 in Cetinje, Yugoslavia) is a Montenegrin model and beauty pageant titleholder who won Miss Montenegro 2011. She represented her country in Miss World 2011 in London.
