= Angie Abdalla =

Egyptian actress, model (born 1980)

- Born: 1980 (age 45–46); Egypt
- Occupations: Actress, model
- Spouse: Alper Bosuter (m. 2015)
- Beauty pageant titleholder
- Hair color: Black
- Eye color: Brown
- Major competition: Pantene Miss Egypt 1999 (winner)

Angie Abdalla (Arabic: إنجي عبد الله) is an Egyptian actress, model and beauty pageant titleholder.

She was crowned Miss Egypt 1999 and represented her country at Miss Universe 1999 pageant.

Abdalla later moved to acting and presentation. She has participated in a number of Egyptian films and TV series.

== Personal life ==
She is married to Alper Bosuter, a Turkish Chargé d'affaires in Cairo.

== Filmography ==
- 2001: Badr, film
- 2010: Iktefaa Sa'eid Mahran, film
- 2010: Alnar Watine, TV series
- 2013: Ahlam, TV series

Preceded by Karine Fahmy	Pantene Miss Egypt; 1999	Succeeded by Ranea El Sayed
