= Miss Seychelles =

Beauty pageant

Miss Seychelles Organization
- Formation: 1969; 57 years ago
- Type: Beauty pageant
- Headquarters: Victoria
- Location: Seychelles
- Members: Miss World; Miss International
- Official language: English; French; Seychellois Creole
- Chairperson: Stephanie Duval
- Parent organization: Beauty Empowerment Seychelles (BES)

Miss Seychelles is the national beauty pageant of the Seychelles responsible for selecting an ambassador of the country.

== History ==
After a four-year absence from the Seychelles' events calendar, the Miss Seychelles Beauty Pageant was reintroduced in 2012. This was the last pageant financed by the government in 2017. Miss Seychelles will return in 2020 under the new moniker "Miss Seychelles the National Pageant," and it will be conducted by the newly founded organization, Beauty Empowerment Seychelles (BES), with Stephanie Duval as chairperson and Margaret Raguin and Kevin Perine assisting her.

=== Mission ===
The pageant's mission is to continue to:

"Propose a new era of involvement for the winner of the competition, opening the door of opportunity in the form of travelling abroad to represent Seychelles, not only in the Miss World pageant, but also at trade fairs and other international events as an ambassadress and spokesperson for our islands - their culture, spectacular natural beauty and national identity."

=== National franchise ===
The National Contest is conducted in agreement with Miss World Limited, the owners and organizers of the Miss World Contest, to elect "Miss World" and it is also an official preliminary contest to select a representative to participate in the Miss World Contest.

== Titleholders ==
This is a list of the pageant's titleholders over time.

Year	Miss Seychelles	District	Notes
1969	Sylvia Labonte	Victoria	
1970	Nicole Barallon	Victoria	
1971	Nadia Morel du Boil	Victoria	
1972	Jane Edna Straevens	Victoria	
1973	June Gouthier	Victoria	
1975	Amelie Lydia Michel	Victoria	
1992	Myrna Chantal Hoareau	La Digue	
1994	Marquise David	Victoria	
1995	Shirley Low-Meng	Victoria	
1996	Christina Pillay	Victoria	
1997	Michelle Lane	Victoria	
1998	Alvina Antoinette Grandcourt	Victoria	
1999	Anna-Mary Jorre de St. Jorre	Victoria	
2008	Elena Angione	Mahé	
2012	Sherlyn Ferneau	Victoria	
2013	Agnes Gerry	Victoria	
2014	Camila Estico	Victoria	
2015	Linne Freminot	Mahé	
2016	Christine Barbier	Mahé	
2017	Hilary Joubert	Victoria	
2020	Kelly-Mary Annette	Mahé	
