= Elena Roca =

Argentine beauty pageant winner (born 1995)

Elena Roca (Born 9 March 1995, in Jujuy) has a degree in Journalistic Communication from the UCA, Universidad Catolica Argentina, Argentine and was an international model in China and beauty pageant titleholder who was crowned Belleza Argentina 2016 but dethroned her title. She had a loving relation with Santiago Moreno Charpentier (better well-known like "Chano"), the ex- singer of the Tan Biónica band and present singer soloist.
