= Miss Fiji =

Beauty pageant

- Formation: 1956
- Type: Beauty pageant
- Headquarters: Suva
- Location: Fiji
- Members: Miss Universe; Miss Earth
- Official language: Fijian; English
- National Directors: Ellen-Whippy Knight; (Miss Hibiscus); Andhy Blake; (Miss World Fiji); Paris Jade; (Miss Universe Fiji); Asvin Singh; (Miss Earth Fiji); Ana Tuiketei; (Miss Fiji)

Miss Fiji is a national Beauty pageant in Fiji.

== History ==
In 1956, the Miss Fiji Pageant Association was established by the local government and Fiji Airways. This event was previously known as the Miss Hibiscus National Pageant. The first Miss Fiji crowned was Liebling Marlow.

The pageant evolved over the years, becoming a platform for young women to showcase their abilities and represent their country on the global stage. In 1979, Fiji made its debut in the Miss Universe pageant with Tanya Whiteside as its representative. This milestone highlighted Fiji's growing presence in the international pageantry scene and allowed its contestants to engage with diverse cultures and global audiences.

In 2023, Fiji won its first International title when Alisha Idana won Miss World Supermodel Teen at the world Supermodel Pageant in Tasmania.

In 2024, Manshika Prasad was initially named the winner only to be told two days later that the title's winner was Nadine Roberts. Miss Universe Fiji, run by Lux Projects, issued a press release saying that Prasad had been chosen in a rigged vote which favoured a "Fiji Indian" contestant to win because it would bring financial benefits to the event's manager. However, media reported that Roberts had been married to Jamie McIntyre, a man closely associated with Lux Projects. The Miss Universe Organization reappointed Prasad as the winner following an investigation.

== Hibiscus Queens Titleholders ==
Year	Miss Hibiscus
1956	Liebling Marlow
1957	Filimaina Koto
1958	Mary Joan Ah Koy
1959	Robin Ann Riemenschnei
1960	Emma Whitcombe
1962	Eta Uluvula Qereqeretabua
1963	Ruci Koroi
1964	Patricia Pickering
1970	Adi Talatoka Lalabalavu (Miss US Consulate)
1972	Esther Quai-Hoi
1974	Sandra Hazelman
1975	Michele Smith
1978	Tanya Whiteside (Miss Tiki Togs)
1979	Margaret Singh
1980	Lynn Michelle MacDonald
1981	Loretta Ragg
1982	Lorna Cristoferson
1983	Annie Raymond
1984	Irene Butt
1985	Ulamila Kaisau
1986	Jane Sharon
1988	Lenora Qereqeretabua (Miss BNZ)
1989	Natalie Grey (Miss BNZ)
1990	Litia Dewa (Miss FTIB)
1991	Sala Toganivalu
1992	Ilisapeci Kubuabola (Miss Reserve Bank of Fiji)
1994	Miranda Foon (Miss Courts)
1995	Jacqueline Mavoa (Miss Reserve Bank of Fiji)
1996	Lynda Tabuya (Miss Suva City Council)
1997	Letila Mitchell (Miss Pasifika Communications)
1998	Ranadi Johnston
1999	Joanne Terubea (Miss Reserve Bank of Fiji)
2002	Sheetal Shivani Ram
2004	Aishwarya Sukhdeo
2005	Shital Ram
2006	Lusia Delai (Miss Reserve Bank of Fiji)
2007	Patricia Ann Naisara (Miss FMF)
2008	Filomena Tuivanualevu Tagivetaua (Miss FBC)
2009	Merewalesi Nailatikau (Miss FNPF)
2010	Sera Tikotikoivatu (Miss Suva City Council)
2011	Alisi Rabukawaqa (Miss Suva City Council)
2012	Drue Slatter (Miss Mai Life Magazine)
2013	Priscilla Preetika Reddy (Miss FBC)
2014	Nanise Noel Ragarau Rainima (Miss APCO)
2015	Marie Fall (Miss Carpenters)
2016	Anne Dunn (Miss Home & Living)
2017	Candace Veramu (Miss Telecom Fiji)
2018	Jessica Fong (Miss Fiji Society for the Blind)
2024	Melania Tora (Miss Tents & Awnings)
2025	Rhyelle Aisea (Miss National Fire Authority)
2026	Salamalawa Korosaya (Miss MHCC & Carpenters Tower)

== Miss Fiji ==
First held in 2015, The Miss Fiji Pageant was established to give winners of municipal-level pageants across the country—from Fiji's 13 town and city municipalities—the chance to compete for a national title, and ultimately represent Fiji at the regional level. Before the national pageant was founded, Fiji's representative to the regional competition was traditionally selected through the Miss Hibiscus pageant. Under that older system, Fiji won two Miss South Pacific (now Miss Pacific Islands) crowns: Merewalesi Nailatikau in 2009 and Alisi Rabukawaqa in 2011. Under the new format, Anne Christine Dunn became the first woman to win at all three levels—municipal, national, and regional—when she won municipal (Hibiscus), was crowned Miss Fiji, and went on to win Miss Pacific Islands 2016. Her sweep was widely referred to in local media as the "Dunn Deal".

Ailava Samuels, won Fiji's 4th Regional Title in 2026, becoming the first woman to have won without clinching the national Miss Fiji title. This came after the titleholder, Dr Peggy Ravusiro declined to sign a contract that would permit her to be Fiji's representative to the regional level. Samuels is also Fiji's first representative to win the regional crown without winning Miss Hibiscus.

In 2025, the Minister for Local Government, Maciu Katamotu and Miss Fiji Pageant Director Ana Tuiketei have confirmed that members of the Fijian diaspora living abroad are also invited to send representatives to participate in the pageant. However, no diaspora representatives were confirmed to have been sent.

Miss Fiji 2015
Venue:	Prince Charles Park, Nadi
Placement	Contestant
Miss Fiji 2015	Miss Ba – Zaira Begg
1st Runner-Up	Miss Suva – Marie Fall
2nd Runner-Up	Miss Nausori – Sheryl Mudaliar
3rd Runner-Up	Miss Sigatoka – Adele Lingam
4th Runner-Up	Miss Levuka – Oliva Vakadranu
Award	Contestant
Best Sarong	Miss Suva – Marie Fall
Best Traditional Attire	Miss Ba – Zaira Begg
Best Research Topic	Miss Ba – Zaira Begg
Best Talent	Miss Ba – Zaira Begg
TFL Favourite Facebook Contestant	Miss Suva – Marie Fall
Miss Internet	Miss Sigatoka – Adele Lingam
Miss Personality	Miss Tavua – Sheetal Raj
National Tourism Award	Miss Lautoka – Neha Narayan
People's Choice Award	Miss Nadi – Seasea Misiki
Miss Photogenic	Miss Suva – Marie Fall
Miss Fiji Placement at Regional Pageant	3rd Runner-Up
Regional Pageant Host	Cook Islands

Miss Fiji 2016
Venue:	Lawaqa Park, Sigatoka
Placement	Contestant
Miss Fiji 2016	Miss Suva – Anne Dunn
1st Runner-Up	Miss Nausori – Sharlin Singh
2nd Runner-Up	Miss Tavua – Nushrat Nisha
3rd Runner-Up	Miss Rakiraki – Sereima Tabuya
4th Runner-Up	Miss Lautoka – Matilda Vakarau
Award	Contestant
Miss Internet	Miss Lautoka – Matilda Vakarau
Miss People's Choice	Miss Lautoka – Matilda Vakarau
Best Float	Miss Lautoka – Matilda Vakarau
Miss Photogenic	Miss Nasinu- Ruci Marama
Miss Personality	Miss Nadi- Grace Senirosi Tueli
Best Talent	Miss Rakiraki- Sereima Tabuya
Best Sarong	Miss Suva – Anne Dunn
Best Research Presentation	Miss Labasa- Alitia Epi
Best Traditional Attire	Miss Nasinu- Ruci Marama
Miss Fiji Placement at Regional Pageant	Miss Pacific Islands 2016
Regional Pageant Host	Samoa

Miss Fiji 2017
Venue:	Thurston Gardens, Suva
Placement	Contestant
Miss Fiji 2017	Miss Nasinu – Hally Qaqa
1st Runner-Up	Miss Suva – Candace Veramu
2nd Runner-Up	Miss Sigatoka – Magdalene Vollmer
3rd Runner-Up	Miss Savusavu – Lusiana Mulo
4th Runner-Up	Miss Levuka – Eka Buadromo
Award	Contestant
Miss People's Choice	Miss Nasinu – Hally Qaqa
Miss Photogenic	Miss Sigatoka – Magdalene Vollmer
Miss Internet	Miss Levuka – Eka Buadromo
Miss Personality	Miss Ba – Teupola Waqabaca
Miss National Tourism	Miss Sigatoka – Magdalene Vollmer
Best Talent	Miss Sigatoka – Magdalene Vollmer
Best Research Topic	Miss Nasinu – Hally Qaqa
Best Traditional Attire	Miss Labasa – Sheral Chand
Best Sarong	Miss Levuka – Eka Buadromo
Best Float	Miss Ba – Teupola Waqabaca
Miss Fiji Placement at Regional Pageant	2nd Runner Up
Regional Pageant Host	Fiji

Miss Fiji 2019
Venue:	Suva Civic Center Auditorium
Placement	Contestant
Miss Fiji 2019	Miss Suva – Jessica Fong
1st Runner-Up	Miss Labasa – Alisi Kautoga
2nd Runner-Up	Miss Lautoka – Crystal Kapoor
3rd Runner-Up	Miss Levuka – Samantha Whippy
4th Runner-Up	Miss Nadi – Kiristiana Uluwai
Award	Contestant
Best Research Topic	Miss Suva – Jessica Fong
Best Traditionally Inspired Attire	Miss Labasa – Alisi Kautoga
Best Sarong	Miss Levuka – Samantha Whippy
Best Talent	Miss Nadi – Kirisitiana Uluwai
Miss Personality	Miss Sigatoka – Cema Bolawaqatabu
Miss Fiji Placement at Regional Pageant	Unplaced
Regional Pageant Host	Papua New Guinea

Miss Fiji 2026
Venue:	Suva Civic Center Auditorium
Placement	Contestant
Miss Fiji 2026	Miss Labasa – Peggy Symmone Ravusiro
1st Runner-Up	Miss Nasinu – Ailava Samuels
2nd Runner-Up	Miss Suva – Rhyelle Aisea
3rd Runner-Up	Miss Rakiraki – Shrdha Mala
4th Runner-Up	Miss Nausori – Berenadeta Waqavanua
Award	Contestant
Best Research Presentation	Miss Labasa – Peggy Ravusiro
Miss Internet	Miss Suva – Rhyelle Aisea
Best Sarong	Miss Suva – Rhyelle Aisea
Miss Photogenic	Miss Nasinu – Ailava Samuels
Best Traditionally Inspired Attire	Miss Nasinu – Ailava Samuels
Best Talent	Miss Rakiraki – Shrdha Mala
Miss Personality	Miss Nadi – Alumeci Davu
Miss Fiji Placement at Regional Pageant (Ailava Samuels-1st Runner Up)	Miss Pacific Islands 2026
Regional Pageant Host	Fiji

=== Miss Hibiscus Regional Representatives ===
Year	Miss Hibiscus	Placement at Miss South Pacific	Regional Pageant Host
1995 (Inaugural Appearance)	Jacqueline Movoa	Unplaced	Tonga
1997	Letila Mitchell	1st Runner Up	New Zealand
1998	Ranadi Johnson	1st Runner Up	Samoa
1999	Joanne Kakoa Terubea	4th Runner Up	Tonga
2002	Sheetal Shivani Ram	Unplaced	Cook Islands
2008	Filomena Tuivanualevu Tagivetaua	3rd Runner Up	American Samoa
2009	Merewalesi Nailatikau	'Miss South Pacific 2009'	Fiji
2010	Sera Tikotikoivatu	3rd Runner Up	Papua New Guinea
2011	Alisi Rabukawaqa	'Miss South Pacific 2011'	Samoa
2012	Drue Slatter	2nd Runner Up	American Samoa
2013	Priscilla Preetika Reddy	Unplaced	Solomon Islands
2014	Nanise Noel Rainima	2nd Runner Up	Samoa

== Fijians at international pageants ==
=== Miss Fiji Universe ===
- : Declared as Winner
- : Ended as runner-up or top 5/6 qualification
- : Ended as one of the finalists or semifinalists
- : Ended as special awards winner

On occasion, when the winner does not qualify (due to age) for either contest, a runner-up is sent.

Year	Division	Miss Fiji	Placement at Miss Universe	Special awards	Notes
Paris Jade directorship — a franchise holder to Miss Universe from 2024
2024	Eastern Division	Manshika Prasad	Unplaced		
Hibiscus Festival of Fiji (Fiji Airways) directorship — a franchise holder to Miss Universe between 1979―1981
Did not compete between 1982—2023
1981	Central Division	Lynn Michelle McDonald	Unplaced		
Did not compete in 1980
1979	Central Division	Tanya Whiteside	Unplaced		

=== Miss Fiji World ===
- : Declared as Winner
- : Ended as runner-up or top 5/6 qualification
- : Ended as one of the finalists or semifinalists
- : Ended as special awards winner

In 2012, the Miss World Fiji pageant was established as a separate entity, distinct from the original Miss Fiji Pageant Association. This move marked a significant development in the Fijian pageantry landscape, allowing for a dedicated platform to select representatives specifically for the Miss World competition.

Year	Division	Miss Fiji World	Placement at Miss World	Special awards	Notes
Andhy Blake directorship — a franchise holder to Miss World from 2012
Did not compete since 2018—Present
2017	Central Division	Nanise Noel Ragarau Rainima	Unplaced	Miss World Talent (Top 5); Beauty with a Purpose (Top 20)	
2016	Western Division	Pooja Priyanka	Unplaced	Miss World Talent (Top 21); Beauty with a Purpose (Top 24)	
2015	Central Division	Brittany Hazelman	Unplaced	Miss World Sports (Top 10); People's Choice Award (Top 15); Multimedia (Top 10); National Dance and Costume (Top 10)	
2014	Western Division	Charlene Sulueti Tafuna'i	Unplaced		
2013	Western Division	Caireen Erbsleben	Unplaced		
2012	Western Division	Koini Elesi Vakaloloma^{[a]}	Unplaced	Miss World Beach Beauty (Top 40)	Torika Watters, the original of Miss World Fiji 2012 did not come to Miss World. A Runner-up, Koini Elesi Vakaloloma was appointed by the committee to compete at Miss World 2012 in Inner Mongolia, China.
Did not compete between 2005—2011
Unknown directorship — a franchise holder to Miss World in 2004
2004	Central Division	Aishwarya Sukhdeo	Unplaced	Miss World Sport (Top 10); Miss World Talent (Top 20)	

=== Miss Fiji Earth ===
- : Declared as Winner
- : Ended as runner-up or top 5/6 qualification
- : Ended as one of the finalists or semifinalists
- : Ended as special awards winner

Year	Division	Miss Fiji Earth	Placement at Miss Earth	Special awards	Notes
Asvin Singh directorship — a franchise holder to Miss Earth from 2014
2024	Western Division	Ashlin Alveena Prasad	Unplaced		
2023	Central Division	Sera Volavola	Did not compete		
Did not compete since 2020—2022
2019	Central Division	Zaira Begg	Unplaced	(silver) Miss Friendship (Air); (bronze) Talent (Air)	
Did not compete between 2016—2018
2015	Central Division	Shyla Angela Prasad	Unplaced	(gold) Most Cheerful	
2014	Central Division	Zoe McCraken	Unplaced		
Talents Fiji directorship — a franchise holder to Miss Earth in 2012
Did not compete in 2013
2012	Central Division	Esther Cheyanne Foss	Unplaced	(gold) I Love My Planet School Campaign	
Unknown directorship — a franchise holder to Miss Earth in 2007
Did not compete between 2008—2011
2007	Central Division	Minal Maneesha Ali	Unplaced		

=== Miss Fiji International ===
- : Declared as Winner
- : Ended as runner-up or top 5/6 qualification
- : Ended as one of the finalists or semifinalists
- : Ended as special awards winner

The Miss International Fiji title does not exist. In 2012, under new ownership, there was an attempt to send a Fijian representative to the Miss International pageant. Unfortunately, this effort did not succeed due to a lack of sponsorship.

Year	Division	Miss Fiji International	Placement at Miss International	Special awards	Notes
Talents Fiji directorship — a franchise holder to Miss International in 2012
Did not compete since 2013—Present
2012	Central Division	Kesaia Kacilala	Did not compete		Due to lack of sponsorship, Kesaia did not attend the Miss International 2012 in Okinawa, Japan.
Unknown directorship — a franchise holder to Miss International between 1994―1996
Did not compete between 1997—2011
1996	Central Division	Sharlotte R. Johenson	Winner		Miss Fiji Title holder
1995	Central Division	Rejieli Ratu	Unplaced		
1994	Central Division	Sunita Devi	Top 15		
