= Tavua District =

District in Ba, Fiji

Coordinates: 17°26′31″S 177°51′47″E

Tavua
- Tikina (District)
- Interactive map of Tavua
- Country: Fiji
- Province: Ba

Population (2017)
  - Total: 23,269

Tavua is a district in the Western Division on the north west coast of the island of Viti Levu in Fiji. It is part of the province of Ba. It is situated some 20 kilometers by road from Ba town. Its main economy is sugar cane, although the establishment of Tavua township was the result of a gold mine in Vatukoula, which is in the interior of Viti Levu but easily accessible from Tavua. A wharf, used by the mine, also exists at Vatia a few kilometres near the coast. The wharf is of historical significance as it was used as the main route of transportation from Suva to the western districts before the coastal road was built.

The district is home to Tavua F.C., who play at Garvey Park (Fiji) in Tavua.

== See also ==
- Local government of Fiji
