= Miss Egypt =

Beauty pageant

- Formation: 1927; 99 years ago
- Headquarters: Cairo
- Location: Egypt
- Official language: Arabic
- Affiliations: Miss Universe; Miss Eco International; Miss Intercontinental; Top Model of the World; Miss Elite World; Miss Elegant International
- Website: www.miss-egypt.com

Miss Egypt (Arabic: ملكة جمال مصر) is a national beauty pageant in Egypt. As of 2024, two competitions are held annually, Miss Universe Egypt and Miss Egypt Bent Masr.

== History ==
=== Early years ===
The first Miss Egypt contest was held in 1927. Charlotte Wassef won the competition in 1934 and was also crowned Miss Universe 1935 in Brussels. The only Miss Egypt winner that held the title of Miss World was Antigone Costanda, who was Miss Egypt 1954 and Miss World the same year.

=== 2012–2013: Absence in pageantry ===
In its 2012 – 2013 edition the pageant was cancelled due to revolutionary conflicts in Egypt.

=== 2014–2015: Face to Face Modelling Agency ===
In 2014, Miss Egypt returned after two years absence, organized by Miss Egypt Organization Face to Face (modelling agency), Let's Take Care of the Planet (Youssef Spahi), the Egyptian Ministry of Tourism, and the Egyptian Tourism Authority. On 27 of August, 2014, the first auditions were held at Sofitel Cairo El Gezirah Hotel, with 79 girls from across the country. The elimination took part over two rounds with 35 girls selected in round 1 and 20 final contestants to enter the semi-finals (round 2), which was held at Citadel of Salah Ed-Din, then they participated in the qualifiers on the final round for the title of Miss Egypt 2014. The ceremony was held in Sharm el Sheikh on 27 September 2014. Lara Debbane was crowned Miss Egypt 2014, Amina Ashraf was crowned Miss Egypt World 2014 and Nancy Magdy was crowned Miss Egypt Earth 2014.

== Titleholders ==
=== Miss Egypt 1927–1965 ===
Year	Miss Egypt	Notes
1927	Yolanda Kassar	
1934	Charlotte Wassef	Miss Universe 1935
1940	Laila Fawzy	
1951	Margeurite Alessendrella	Mr. Bertin's agency
1953	Marina Papaelia	
1954	Antigone Costanda	Miss World 1954
1955	Iolanda Cristina Gigliotti (Dalida)	
1955	Karima Abdulla	
1956	Norma Dugo	
1958	Leila Saad	
1964	Laila Sho’air	
1965	Omaima Emara	

=== Pantene Miss Egypt 1986–2010 ===
The following is a list of winners. From 1986 to 2010, Pantene acquired the naming rights and the competition.

Year	Miss Egypt	Notes
1987	Hoda Aboud	Marie France directorship
1988	Amina Sami El Shelbaya	
1989	Sally Attah	
1990	Dalia El Behery	
1992	Samia Mohamed	
1993	Lamia Noshi	
1994	Ghada El Salem	
1995	Nadia Ezz	
1996	Hadeel Aboulnaga	
1997	Amel Shawky Soleiman	
1997	Iman Abdilla Thakeb	
1998	Karine Fahmy	Youssef Spahi directorship
1999	Angie Abdalla	
2001	Sarah Shaheen	
2003	Horeya Farghaly	Dethroned
2004	Heba Ahmed El Sisy	
2005	Meriam George	
2006	Fawzia Mohamed	
2007	Ehsan Hatem El Kirdany	
2008	Yara Naoum	
2009	Elham Wagdy	
2010	Donia Hamed	

=== Miss Egypt 2014 ===
In 2014 after 3 years absence, Miss Egypt managed the Top 3 into 3 major winners; Miss Egypt, Miss Egypt World and Miss Egypt Earth under Youssef Spahi directorship.

Year	Miss Egypt	Miss Egypt World	Miss Egypt Earth
2014	Lara Debbana	Amina Ashraf	Nancy Magdy

=== Miss Egypt Bent Masr ===
dr. Amaal Rezk took over the brand of Miss Egypt and rebranded as Miss Egypt Bent Masr. The winner sets to Miss Eco International.

Year	Miss Egypt Bent Masr	Notes
2016	Nadine Osama	Amaal Rezk directorship
2017	Farah Shaaban	
2018	Reem Raafat	
2019	Alaa Atef	
2020	Nesma Atallah	
2021	Nadeen Elgayar	
2022	Hagar Mokhtar	
2023	Shaden Galal	
2024	Salma Ali	

=== Miss Egypt Universe ===
Year	Miss Egypt	Notes
2017	Farah Sedky	Hoda Aboud directorship
2018	Nariman Khaled	
2019	Diana Hamed	
2023	Mohra Tantawy	Josh Yugen directorship
2024	Logina Salah	
2025	Sabrina Maged	

== Placements ==
The following women have represented Egypt in the Big Four international beauty pageants, the four major international beauty pageants for women. These are Miss World, Miss Universe, Miss International and Miss Earth.

=== Miss Egypt Universe ===
- : Declared as Winner
- : Ended as runner-up or top 5/6 qualification
- : Ended as one of the finalists or semifinalists
- : Ended as special awards winner

The Miss Egypt has started to send a Miss Egypt to Miss Universe from 1987. Miss Egypt 1986, Hoda Aboud was winning the first title of Miss Egypt after many years did not held in Egypt by Miss Egypt Organization. Began 2017 a brand new of Miss Egypt Universe organized by Hoda Aboud sends a national winning title to Miss Universe. On occasion, when the winner does not qualify (due to age) for either contest, a runner-up is sent.

Year	Governorate	Miss Egypt Universe	Placement at Miss Universe	Special award(s)	Notes
Josh Yugen directorship — a franchise holder to Miss Universe from 2023
2026	Cairo	Sonia Gergis	TBA		
2025	Cairo	Sabrina Maged	Unplaced		
2024	Alexandria	Logina Salah	Top 30		
2023	Cairo	Mohra Tantawy	Unplaced		
Hoda Aboud directorship — a franchise holder to Miss Universe between 2017―2019
Did not compete between 2020—2022
2019	Cairo	Aya Abdelrazik	Did not compete		Replacement — Aya Abdelrazik assumed the title after Diana Hamed was dethroned.
2019	Cairo	Diana Hamed	Unplaced		Withdrawal — Dethroned after competing at Miss Universe 2019, her runner-up, Aya Abdelrazik replaced her as the new Miss Egypt 2019.
2018	Red Sea	Nariman Khaled	Unplaced		
2017	Cairo	Farah Sedky	Unplaced	Miss Congeniality	
Youssef Spahi directorship — a franchise holder to Miss Universe between 1998―2014
Did not compete between 2015—2016
2014	Cairo	Lara Debbana	Unplaced		
Did not compete between 2012—2013
2011	Cairo	Sara El-Khouly	Unplaced		Appointed — The 1st Runner-up of Miss Egypt 2010, Sara El-Khouly was designated by Miss Egypt Organization after the Miss Egypt Contest failed to be held in 2011; Sara El-Khouly previously won Miss Mediterranean 2011.
2010	Cairo	Donia Hamed	Unplaced		
2009	Cairo	Elham Wagdy	Unplaced		
2008	Cairo	Yara Naoum	Unplaced		
2007	Alexandria	Ehsan Hatem El Kirdany	Unplaced		
2006	Cairo	Fawzia Mohamed	Unplaced		
2005	Cairo	Meriam George	Unplaced		Veteran queen who made the Top 12 of Miss Intercontinental 2005, Top 8 of Miss Earth 2006 and 1st Runner-up of Miss Asia Pacific World Super Talent 2013.
2004	Dakahlia	Heba Ahmed El Sisy	Unplaced	Best National Costume (Top 10)	
2003	Cairo	Nour El-Semary	Unplaced		Replacement — The Miss Egypt 2003, Horeya Farghaly was dethroned by Miss Egypt Organization — Nour El-Semary took over as the new Miss Egypt 2003 and represented Egypt at Miss Universe 2003 in Panama.
2002	Cairo	Sally Shaheen	Unplaced		
2001	Cairo	Sarah Shaheen	Unplaced		
2000	Cairo	Ranea El Sayed	Unplaced		
1999	Alexandria	Angie Abdalla	Unplaced		
1998	Cairo	Karine Fahmy	Unplaced		
Marie France directorship — a franchise holder to Miss Universe between 1987―1997
1997	Alexandria	Iman Abdilla Thakeb	Unplaced		
1996	Cairo	Hadeel Abd El Naga	Unplaced		
1995	Cairo	Nadia El Ezz	Unplaced		
1994	Cairo	Ghada El Salem	Unplaced		
Did not compete in 1993
1992	Cairo	Lamina Noshi	Unplaced		
Did not compete in 1991
1990	Gharbia	Dalia El Behery	Unplaced		
1989	Cairo	Sally Atta	Unplaced		
1988	Alexandria	Amina Sami El Shelbaya	Unplaced		
1987	Alexandria	Hoda Aboud	Unplaced		In 2017 Hoda Aboud was appointed by Miss Universe Organization as the President of Miss Egypt Universe.

=== Miss Egypt World ===
- : Declared as Winner
- : Ended as runner-up or top 5/6 qualification
- : Ended as one of the finalists or semifinalists
- : Ended as special awards winner

The 1st Runner-up at Miss Egypt between 1987 and 2014 went to Miss World and began in 2016 the franchise holder took over by Miss Egypt Bent Msr (operated by Dr. Amel Rizk). Egypt sends a delegate to Miss World since 1953 and now a delegate will be casting by Youssef Spahi (former president of Miss Egypt, Face of Face Agency) who last operated Miss Egypt in 2014.

Year	Governorate	Miss Egypt World	Placement at Miss World	Special award(s)	Notes
Youssef Spahi directorship — a franchise holder to Miss World from 2018
Did not compete since 2019—Present
2018	Cairo	Mony Helal	Unplaced		
dr. Amel Rizk directorship — a franchise holder to Miss World between 2016―2017
2017	Cairo	Farah Shaaban	Unplaced		
2016	Cairo	Nadeen Osama El Sayed	Unplaced		
Youssef Spahi directorship — a franchise holder to Miss World between 2004―2015
2015	Cairo	Lara Debbana	Did not compete		Appointed — Miss Egypt 2014 designated for Miss World 2015 but withdrew for personal reasons.
2014	Cairo	Amina Ashraf	Unplaced		
Did not compete between 2012—2013
2011	Cairo	Donia Hamed	Unplaced		Appointed — The Miss Egypt 2010, Donia Hamed was designated by Miss Egypt Organization after the Miss Egypt Contest failed to be held in 2011 — Miss Egypt traditionally sends its runner-up or second position to Miss World under Youssef Spahi directorship.
2010	Cairo	Sara El-Khouly	Unplaced		
2009	Cairo	Samah Adel Shalaby	Unplaced		
2008	Cairo	Sanna Ismail Hamed	Unplaced		
Did not compete between 2005—2007
2004	Dakahlia	Heba Ahmed El Sisy	Unplaced		
Marie France directorship — a franchise holder to Miss World between 1987―1997
Did not compete between 1998—2003
1997	Cairo	Amel Shawky Soleiman	Unplaced		
Did not compete between 1991—1996
1990	Gharbia	Dalia El Behery	Unplaced		
Did not compete in 1989
1988	Cairo	Dina El Nagar	Unplaced		
1987	Alexandria	Heba Khalef	Unplaced		
Miss Egypt (old) directorship — a franchise holder to Miss World between 1953―1956
Did not compete between 1957—1986
1956	Cairo	Norma Dugo	Unplaced		
1955	―	Gladys Hoene	Did not compete		
1954	Alexandria	Antigone Costanda	Miss World 1954		
1953	Alexandria	Marina Papaelia	2nd Runner-up		

=== Miss Egypt International ===
- : Declared as Winner
- : Ended as runner-up or top 5/6 qualification
- : Ended as one of the finalists or semifinalists
- : Ended as special awards winner

The Miss Egypt for Miss International awarded to former Miss Egypt winners or designation queens. Since the Miss International franchise in Egypt has rarely taken, the title has not extended since 2019. Last franchise holder was in 2018 by Hoda Aboud directorship.

Year	Governorate	Miss Egypt International	Placement at Miss International	Special award(s)	Notes
Hoda Aboud directorship — a franchise holder to Miss International from 2018
Did not compete since 2019—Present
2018	Cairo	Farah Sedky	Unplaced		
dr. Amel Rizk directorship — a franchise holder to Miss International in 2016
Did not compete in 2017
2016	Cairo	Sandra Saeed	Did not compete		
Youssef Spahi directorship — a franchise holder to Miss International between 1999―2015
Did not compete in 2015
2014	Cairo	Perihan Fateen	Unplaced		
Did not compete between 2008—2013
2007	Cairo	Madonna Khaled Adib	Unplaced		
2006	Cairo	Elham Wagdy	Unplaced		
Did not compete in 2005
2004	Cairo	Dina Abel	Unplaced		
Did not compete between 2001—2003
2000	Cairo	Hagar El Taher	Unplaced		
1999	Alexandria	Angie Abdalla	Unplaced		

=== Miss Egypt Earth ===
- : Declared as Winner
- : Ended as runner-up or top 5/6 qualification
- : Ended as one of the finalists or semifinalists
- : Ended as special awards winner

The Miss Egypt for Miss Earth awarded to former Miss Egypt winners or runners-up. Began 2018 the Miss Egypt Earth individual casting opened under Mustafa Elizali directorship.

Year	Governorate	Miss Egypt Earth	Placement at Miss Earth	Special awards	Notes
Mustafa Elizali directorship — a franchise holder to Miss Earth from 2018
2025	Cairo	Kenzy Elmongy	Did not compete		
Did not compete between 2019—2024
2018	Cairo	Lamia Fathi	Unplaced		
Youssef Spahi directorship — a franchise holder to Miss Earth between 2014―2015
Did not compete between 2016—2017
2015	Cairo	Imaj Ahmed Hassan	Unplaced	(bronze) Snowman Building Challenge	
2014	Cairo	Nancy Magdy	Top 16	(bronze) Best National Costume	
The Miss Egypt Earth held by closed casting or model agency
Did not compete between 2011—2013
2010	Cairo	Doa Hakam El Mal	Unplaced		
Youssef Spahi directorship — a franchise holder to Miss Earth between 2003―2006
Did not compete between 2007—2009
2006	Cairo	Meriam George	Top 8		
2005	Cairo	Elham Wagdy	Unplaced		
2004	Alexandria	Arwa Yhaia Gouda	Top 16		
2003	Did not compete				
2002	Cairo	Ines Gohar	Unplaced		

== See also ==
- List of beauty pageants
