= Marija Ćirović =

Montenegrin model (born 1989)

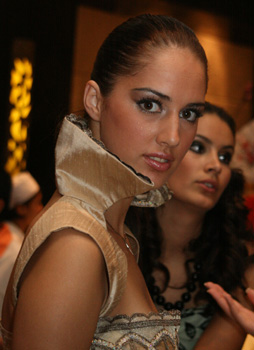
- Marija during Miss World 2007
- Born: Marija Ćirović; 1989 (age 36–37); Nikšić, Yugoslavia
- Beauty pageant titleholder
- Title: Miss Montenegro 2007

Marija Ćirović is a Montenegrin model and beauty pageant titleholder who represented Montenegro at Miss World 2007 in Sanya, China.
