= Ramez Galal =

Egyptian actor and singer, and prankster (born 1973)

- رامز جلال
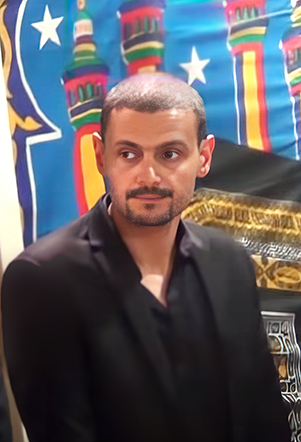
- Galal in 2014
- Born: 20 April 1973 (age 53); Cairo, Egypt
- Education: Academy of Arts
- Occupations: Actor, singer
- Years active: 1993–present

Ramez Galal (Arabic: رامز جلال; born 20 April 1973) is an Egyptian prankster, actor, and singer. He graduated from the Egyptian Academy of Arts.

== Biography ==
Ramez Galal is the son of the theater director Galal Tawfik and the younger brother of Yasser Galal. He studied at Kasr Al Tefl primary school and then moved to El Orman preparatory school. His secondary school was El Giza. After graduating, Galal decided to join the institute for dramatic arts, the acting and directing section. Galal entered military service after graduating, then returned to acting. In his early career, he got the chance to act alongside the prominent actor Salah Zulfikar in the 1993 TV special "Al-Rajul Al-Tayeb". In 2014 he appeared in a TV advertisement for Zain.

== Television ==
In his prank show episodes, which are aired during Ramadan, Galal's guests are seen in fear for their lives. He has pranked famous Egyptian people and international stars like Paris Hilton, Steven Seagal, and Shah Rukh Khan. The reaction by Shah Rukh Khan during the punked show, was the fourth most trending YouTube video during the first week of Ramadan 2017. Despite the wild popularity of his shows, Galal has met with criticism. A person speaking for animal rights complained that a lion was sedated for the show. Another critic said the "insults" that fly when his guests are punked ruin Egypt's reputation. In 2020, Zamalek president Mortada Mansour filed a lawsuit demanding that Ramez Magnoon Rasmy (Ramez is Officially Crazy) prank show be suspended.

== Filmography ==
List of show performances
Year	Title	Role	Notes
2026	Ramez Level Al-Wahsh (Ramez Beast Level)	Host / Commentator	Prank Show
2025	Ramez Elon Masr (Ramez Elon Egypt)	Host / Commentator	Prank Show
2024	Ramez Gab Mn El Akher (Ramez Cuts to the Chase)	Host / Commentator	Prank Show
2023	Ramez Never End	Host / Commentator	Prank Show
2022	Ramez Movie Star	Host / Commentator	Prank Show
2021	Ramez Aqlo Tar (Ramez Lost His Mind)	Host / Commentator	Prank Show
2020	Ramez Magnoon Rasmy (Ramez is Officially Crazy)	Host / Commentator	Prank Show
2019	Ramez Fe Al-Shallal (Ramez in the Waterfall)	Host / Commentator	Prank Show
2018	Ramez Taht Al-Sefr (Ramez Sub-Zero)	Host / Commentator	Prank Show
2017	Ramez Taht El-Ard (Ramez Underground)	Host / Commentator	Prank Show
2016	Ramez Byla'ab Bel-Nar (Ramez Plays with Fire)	Host / Commentator	Prank Show
2015	Ramez Wakel el-Gaw (Ramez in Control)	Host / Commentator	Prank Show
2014	Ramez Qirsh Al-Bahr (Ramez Sea Shark)	Host / Commentator	Prank Show
2013	Ramez Ankh Amon (Ramez Tutankhamun)	Host / Commentator	Prank Show
2012	Ramez Thaalab El-Sahra (Ramez Desert Fox)	Host / Commentator	Prank Show
2011	Ramez Qalb al-Assad (Ramez Lionheart)	Host / Commentator	Prank Show
2010	Ramez Around The World 2 (in America)	Host / Himself	Reality TV
2009	Ramez Around The World	Host / Himself	Reality TV

List of film performances
Year	Title	Role	Notes
2001	55 Esaf	Officer Magdy	
2003	Mido Mashakel	Ramzy	Galal sings
2004	Hobak Nar	Tarek	
2004	El Basha Telmiz	Hamza Abdelhak	Galal sings
2005	Ghawy Hob	Walid	
2005	Eial Habiba	Memes	
2005	Ahlam Omrena	Mohamed	
2007	A7lam EL Fata EL Tayesh	Wahid Farid Fathi Lbab	Galal sings Ayzany Akhess
2008	Shebh Mon7aref	Nasser Mo3giza	Galal composed and sang Ayesh Fe Seeba.
2009	Had Same3 Haga	Sami	Galal sings the title song
2012	Ghesh El Zawgeya	Hazim	Galal sings the title song
2014	Meraty w Zawgaty	Hassam	
2016	Kanghar Hubbena	Khaled	
2018	Savage Raghda	Ismail/Raghda	
2019	Sab'e Alboromba	Omar	
2021	Ahmed Notre Dame	Ahmed Lashin	

== Interviews ==
In an interview discussing the 2017 Minya attack where 29 Christians, including children, on their way to a monastery in Minya were killed, Galal burst into tears describing his feelings about the tragedy.
