= Slankamen =

Slankamen may refer to:

- Stari Slankamen ("Old Slankamen"), a village in Vojvodina, Serbia
- Novi Slankamen ("New Slankamen"), a village in Vojvodina, Serbia
- Battle of Slankamen, during the Great Turkish War in 1691
