= Pantene =

Hair product brand

- Product type: Hair care
- Current owner: Procter & Gamble
- Produced by: Richardson Vicks (1985); Procter & Gamble (1985–present)
- Country: Switzerland (1945–1985) (original); United States (1985–present)
- Introduced: 1945; 81 years ago, Switzerland (original); 1985; 41 years ago, United States
- Discontinued: 1985; 41 years ago, Switzerland (original)
- Markets: Worldwide
- Previous owners: Hoffmann-La Roche (1945–1985) (original); Richardson Vicks (1985)
- Ambassadors: Maudy Ayunda, Priyanka Chopra and Selena Gomez (Worldwide)
- Tagline: Strong Is Beautiful (English) 让奇迹发生 (Ràng qíjì fāshēng, Chinese); Kuat Itu Cantik (Malay Indonesian)
- Website: pantene.com

Pantene (/ˌpænˈtiːn, -ˈtɛn/) is an American brand of hair care products now owned by Procter & Gamble (P&G). The product line originated in Europe in 1945 by Hoffmann-La Roche of Switzerland, which based the name on panthenol. It started to be introduced in the United States and around the world in 1985 when it was purchased by Richardson Vicks (Vicks) of the United States. That company was taken over in the same year by P&G in order for P&G to compete in the "beauty product" market rather than only functional products.

The brand's best-known product became the 2-in-1 shampoo and conditioning formula, Pantene Pro-V (Pantene Pro-Vitamin). The product became most noted due to an advertising campaign in the 1989 in which fashion models said, "Don't hate me because I'm beautiful." Kelly Le Brock and Iman gained notoriety as the first television spokeswomen to speak the line. The line was criticized by feminists and became a pop-culture catchphrase for "annoying" narcissistic behavior.

== Marketing and advertising campaigns ==
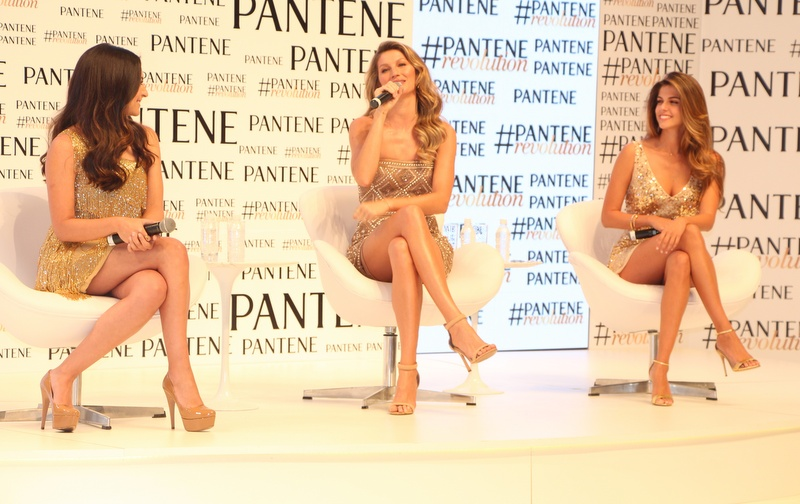
The ambassadors of Pantene (from left to right: Ana Brenda, Gisele Bündchen and Stephanie Cayo)

In 1990, Procter & Gamble Taiwan launched a new advertising campaign surrounding its new Pantene Pro-V formula, a combination of Pantene's vitamin formula and P&G's 2-in-1 technology. Pantene Pro-V was first introduced in Taiwan and a year later in the US and globally. Research results, compiled from markets around the world, led P&G to hypothesize that health positioning might provide the basis for a new worldwide hair care franchise. The research indicated that: Women believed the ideal standard for hair is "healthy". Women considered their own hair damaged and therefore believed that shine signaled health. Pro-vitamin formulation provided real support for claims. Advertising was developed around a health positioning and customized at the local level with the tagline, "Hair So Healthy It Shines." The new product, Pantene Pro-V was introduced in newly designed cylindrical shaped bottles. There were four lead countries involved in Pantene's Pro-V launch. Each communicated a different piece of the strategy and execution elements, as follows

- United States: a television campaign was developed using an authoritative spokeswoman and showing the transformation of the model's hair;
- Taiwan: dramatized the end-result - the shine (a very powerful end benefit in this part of the world);
- France: dramatized the vitamin capsule ingredient story;
- United Kingdom: demonstrated product efficacy via the hair root demonstration.

By 1994, following its launch in 55 countries, Pantene was the #1 hair care brand around the world with sales reaching over $1 billion. By 1996, it was still leading in 78 countries and by 1998, it was the leading shampoo in 90 countries. Pantene was advertised as approved by Swiss Vitamin Institute.

Currently, Pantene is widely available in much of the world. Maudy Ayunda, Priyanka Chopra, Selena Gomez, and Kelsea Ballerini are the current global ambassadors for Pantene. Pantene ambassadors for specific countries include Nolwenn Leroy for Pantene France, Anushka Sharma for Pantene India, Urassaya Sperbund for Pantene Thailand,Zhou Xun and Lin Chi-ling for Pantene Southeast Asia, Tang Wei and Liu Yifei for Pantene Southeast Asia, K-pop idols Yuri and Seohyun of Girls' Generation for Pantene Southeast Asia, Gabbi Garcia for Pantene Singapore and Philippines, Ellie Goulding for Pantene Australia, New Zealand and United Kingdom, Farah Ann Abdul Hadi for Pantene Malaysia and Brunei, Maudy Ayunda and Raline Shah for Pantene Indonesia, Tini Stoessel for Pantene Argentina and Latin America (in Latin America it was renamed PanTini), Gisele Bündchen for Pantene Brazil, Ana Brenda for Pantene Mexico, Stephanie Cayo for Pantene Peru, Evgenia Medvedeva for Pantene Russia and Neslihan Atagül & Demet Özdemir for Pantene Turkey. Arashi's Kazunari Ninomiya appeared as a stylist for the 2025 campaign in Japan.

From June 2006 to December 2018, Pantene and the Entertainment Industry Foundation operated the Pantene Beautiful Lengths' charity campaign in the United States, which allowed individuals to donate hair for women who lost their own due to cancer treatment.

In 2021, in an advertising campaign, the brand featured a young trans girl with her parents, a lesbian couple.

== Ambassadors ==
- Priyanka Chopra (Pantene Worldwide)
- Selena Gomez (Pantene Worldwide)
- Ronda Rousey (Pantene Worldwide)
- Cornelia Agatha (2003–2009) (Pantene Indonesia)
- Siti Nurhaliza (2006–2008) (Pantene Indonesia, Malaysia, Singapore and Brunei)
- Marissa Nasution (2011–2012) (Pantene Indonesia)
- Nirina Zubir (2011) (Pantene Indonesia)
- Eva Ria Hafizta (2011–2012) (Pantene Indonesia)
- Mariana Renata (2011) (Pantene Indonesia)
- Rossa (2011–2012) (Pantene Indonesia)
- Gita Gutawa (2012–2013) (Pantene Indonesia)
- Dominique Diyose (2012–2013) (Pantene Indonesia)
- Anggun Cipta Sasmi (2008–31 December 2016 and 1 February 2017 – 31 August 2020) (Pantene Indonesia)
- Jenahara Nasution (1 February 2017 – 31 August 2020) (Pantene Indonesia)
- Tara Basro (1 February 2017 – 31 August 2020) (Pantene Indonesia)
- Elle & Jess Yamada (1 February 2017 – 31 August 2020) (Pantene Indonesia)
- Maudy Ayunda (1 July 2018–present) (Pantene Indonesia and Worldwide)
- Raline Shah (1 August 2016–present) (Pantene Indonesia)
- Farah Ann Abdul Hadi (Pantene Malaysia and Brunei)
- Yuri of Girls' Generation (Pantene Korea)
- Seohyun of Girls' Generation (Pantene Korea)
- Nolwenn Leroy (Pantene France)
- Woranuch Bhirombhakdi (Pantene Thailand)
- Urassaya Sperbund (Pantene Thailand)
- Niki Chow (Pantene Hong Kong)
- Vivian Chow (Pantene Hong Kong)
- Kathy Chow (Pantene Hong Kong)
- Vanessa Yeung (Pantene Hong Kong)
- Zhou Xun (2009-2010) (Pantene China)
- Tang Wei (2010–2016) (Pantene China)
- Liu Yifei (Pantene China)
- Lin Chi-ling (Pantene China)
- Barbie Hsu (Pantene Taiwan and Philippines) (2003–2009)
- Bipasha Basu (Pantene India) (2010–2012)
- Anushka Sharma (Pantene India)
- Manushi Chhillar (Pantene India)
- Ellie Goulding (Pantene Australia, New Zealand and Great Britain)
- Tini Stoessel (2018–present) (Pantene Argentina and Latin America)
- Gisele Bündchen (Pantene Brazil)
- Ana Brenda (Pantene Mexico)
- Stephanie Cayo (Pantene Peru)
- Evgenia Medvedeva (Pantene Russia)
- Chin Chin Gutierrez (1995–1997) (Pantene Philippines)
- Dayanara Torres (1998–1999) (Pantene Philippines)
- Bergüzar Korel (Pantene Turkey)
- Neslihan Atagül (Pantene Turkey)
- Demet Özdemir (Pantene Turkey)
- Angel Aquino (1995–2004, 2006–2010) (Pantene Philippines)
- Gretchen Barretto (2001–2002, 2006–2012) (Pantene Philippines)
- Maxene Magalona (2003–2005) (Pantene Philippines and Vietnam)
- Iza Calzado (2002–2006, 2012) (Pantene Philippines)
- Jennylyn Mercado (2005) (Pantene Philippines)
- Kris Aquino (2006–2018) (Pantene Philippines)
- Bianca Gonzalez (2006–2007, 2012–2014) (Pantene Philippines)
- Dawn Zulueta (2006–2008) (Pantene Philippines)
- Ruffa Gutierrez (2006–2009) (Pantene Philippines)
- Vicky Morales (2007) (Pantene Philippines)
- Claudine Barretto (2008–2011) (Pantene Philippines)
- Judy Ann Santos (2008–2009) (Pantene Philippines)
- Carla Abellana (2010–2011) (Pantene Philippines)
- Andi Eigenmann (2010–2011) (Pantene Philippines)
- Maricar Reyes (2010–2012) (Pantene Philippines)
- Angelica Panganiban (2010–2013) (Pantene Philippines)
- Erich Gonzales (2010–2013) (Pantene Philippines)
- Empress Schuck (2010-2015) (Pantene Philippines)
- Cristine Reyes (2012–2013) (Pantene Philippines)
- Iya Villania (2012–2014) (Pantene Philippines)
- Denise Laurel (2013–2015) (Pantene Philippines)
- Bea Alonzo (2014–2016) (Pantene Philippines)
- Gabbi Garcia (2017–present) (Pantene Singapore and Philippines)
- Jasmine Curtis (2017–2019) (Pantene Philippines)
- Anne Curtis (2018–present) (Pantene Philippines)
- Moira Dela Torre (2024) (PANTENE PHILIPPINES)
- Heaven Peralejo (2017) (Pantene Philippines)
- Hidilyn Diaz (2022–present) (Pantene Philippines)
- Maddison Brown (2017–present) (Pantene Australia)
- Katie Piper (2019–present) (Pantene Great Britain)
- Lucy Edwards (2021–present) (Pantene Great Britain)
- Roxie Smith (2021–2024) (Pantene Philippines)
- Jane de Leon (2023–present) (Pantene Philippines)
- Kelsea Ballerini (2024–present) (Pantene Worldwide)
- Janella Salvador (2025–present) (Pantene Philippines)
- Michał Szpak (2022–present) (Pantene Poland)
- Kazunari Ninomiya (2025–present) (Pantene Japan)

== Slogan ==
- Strong Is Beautiful (English)
- Fuerza es belleza (Spanish)
- Měi zìqiáng rèn (Chinese)
- Kuat Itu Cantik (Indonesian)

=== Campaign slogans ===
- See Beauty, Not Gender (Thai: ความสวยไม่ได้ดูที่เพศ, romanized: Khwām suaymai dai du thīphēt) (Thailand, 2018)
- Don't hate me because I'm strong (Indonesia, 2016)
