= Miss Russia 2024 =

30th edition of the Miss Russia competition

- Date: 5 October 2024
- Presenters: Maxim Privalov; Olga Zhuk
- Entertainment: Margarita Golubeva; MONA; Yulianna Karaulova
- Venue: Barvikha Luxury Village, Moscow, Russia
- Entrants: 50
- Placements: 20
- Winner: Valentina Alekseeva; Chuvashia

Miss Russia 2024 (Russian: Мисс Россия 2024, romanized: Miss Rossiya 2024) was the 30th edition of the Miss Russia pageant. The competition was held on 5 October 2024 at Barvikha Luxury Village in Moscow. The pageant was hosted by Maxim Privalov and Olga Zhuk, while Margarita Golubeva, MONA, and Yulianna Karaulova performed.

Margarita Golubeva of Saint Petersburg crowned her successor Valentina Alekseeva of Chuvashia at the end of the event. She represented Russia at Miss Universe 2024, where she placed in the Top 12.

== Results ==
=== Placements ===
Placement	Contestant
Miss Russia 2024	Chuvashia – Valentina Alekseeva §
1st Runner-Up	Tolyatti – Irina Mironova §
2nd Runner-Up	Saint Petersburg – Ulyana Evdokimova §
Top 10	Ivanovo – Elizaveta Krylova; Kozmodemyansk – Valeria Lebedeva; Rostov Oblast – Yana Alekseeva §; Rostov-on-Don – Alexandra Mandrykina §; Saratov Oblast – Angelina Gorbunova §; Simferopol – Anastasia Krainyuk; Udmurtia – Kamilla Faizulova §
Top 20	Bashkortostan – Radmila Asfandiyarova; Feodosia – Diana Kravchik; Krasnoyarsk – Eva Schmidt; Moscow – Polina Kalinchuk §; Tambov Oblast – Daria Sokolova; Tula – Milana Yavorskaya; Tula Oblast – Anastasia Azimova; Ulyanovsk – Adel Ilyasova §; Volgograd – Victoria Lazareva; Yakutia – Aiyyna Pudova §

§ – Qualified to the Top 20 via the fan vote

=== Special awards ===
Award	Contestant
Best National Costume	Bashkortostan – Radmila Asfandiyarova; Feodosia – Diana Kravchik; Khabarovsk Krai – Maria Zhukova; Krasnoyarsk – Eva Schmidt; Yakutia – Aiyyna Pudova
Best Charity Project	Bashkortostan – Radmila Asfandiyarova; Chuvashia – Valentina Alekseeva; Krasnodar Krai – Daria Reshta; Krasnoyarsk – Eva Schmidt; Nizhnevartovsk – Polina Kvitka; Orenburg – Elizaveta Tikhonova; Tula Oblast – Anastasia Azimova; Vladivostok – Anna Neskorodyeva; Yekaterinburg – Sofia Ershkova; Yoshkar-Ola – Anastasia Merkurieva

== Contestants ==
50 contestants competed in Miss Russia 2024:

#	Representing	Name	Age	Result
1	Krasnoyarsk	Eva Schmidt	22	Top 20
2	Nizhnevartovsk	Polina Kvitka	22	
3	Komsomolsk-on-Amur	Alla Makaida	22	
4	Yakutia	Aiyyna Pudova	23	Top 20
5	Khabarovsk	Kristina Andreychuk	20	
6	Krasnodar Krai	Daria Reshta	19	
7	Izhevsk	Alexandra Ivanova	20	
8	Tver	Sofia Levashova	19	
9	Chuvashia	Valentina Alekseeva	18	Miss Russia 2024
10	Belgorod	Daria Bout	19	
11	Ulyanovsk	Adel Ilyasova	21	Top 20
12	Saint Petersburg	Ulyana Evdokimova	20	2nd Runner-Up
13	Yuzhno-Sakhalinsk	Nadezhda Igamberdyeva	20	
14	Vladivostok	Anna Neskorodyeva	18	
15	Yoshkar-Ola	Anastasia Merkurieva	21	
16	Orenburg	Elizaveta Tikhonova	21	
17	Khakassia	Yulia Pogorelova	23	
18	Simferopol	Anastasia Krainyuk	19	Top 10
19	Volgograd	Victoria Lazareva	18	Top 20
20	Moscow	Polina Kalinchuk	20	Top 20
21	Yekaterinburg	Sofia Ershkova	21	
22	Omsk	Alina German	22	
23	Kozmodemyansk	Valeria Lebedeva	18	Top 10
24	Udmurtia	Kamilla Faizulova	21	Top 10
25	Birobidzhan	Diana Strunnikova	18	
26	Moscow Oblast	Ksenia Tolochek	19	
27	Bashkortostan	Radmila Asfandiyarova	23	Top 20
28	Khabarovsk Krai	Maria Zhukova	22	
29	Volzhsky	Yulia Kiyashkina	19	
30	Volgograd Oblast	Valeria Korostyleva	22	
31	Leningrad Oblast	Anastasia Feliferova	20	
32	Ivanovo	Elizaveta Krylova	18	Top 10
33	Severodvinsk	Darina Tyulina	18	
34	Saratov Oblast	Angelina Gorbunova	22	Top 10
35	Tambov Oblast	Daria Sokolova	23	Top 20
36	Ulyanovsk Oblast	Zlata Antonova	21	
37	Kazan	Sofia Moiseeva	22	
38	Feodosia	Diana Kravchik	18	Top 20
39	Tula Oblast	Anastasia Azimova	21	Top 20
40	Rostov-on-Don	Alexandra Mandrykina	18	Top 10
41	Kemerovo	Daria Arzanykh	23	
42	Mari El	Ekaterina Kozhevnikova	18	
43	Cheboksary	Alla Kadeeva	18	
44	Tatarstan	Ramina Pronina	22	
45	Rostov Oblast	Yana Alekseeva	21	Top 10
46	Tyumen	Anastasia Sokolova	23	
47	Crimea	Veronika Naumova	21	
48	Tolyatti	Irina Mironova	22	1st Runner-Up
49	Tula	Milana Yavorskaya	18	Top 20
50	Astrakhan	Valeria Pavlova	21	

== Judges ==
The judges for the competition were:

- Anastasia Belyak – Miss Russia director
- Yulianna Karaulova – singer
- Igor Kimyashov – hairstylist
- Dmitry Malikov – singer
- Vladimir Matetsky – composer
