= Miss Russia 2025 =

31st edition of the Miss Russia competition

- Date: 4 October 2025
- Presenters: Vera Krasova; Maxim Privalov
- Entertainment: Eva Vlasova; Dmitry Malikov; Alsou
- Venue: Barvikha Luxury Village, Moscow, Russia
- Entrants: 50
- Placements: 20
- Winner: Anastasia Venza; Moscow Oblast

Miss Russia 2025 (Russian: Мисс Россия 2025, romanized: Miss Rossiya 2025) was the 31st edition of the Miss Russia pageant. The competition was held on 4 October 2025 at Barvikha Luxury Village in Moscow.

Valentina Alekseeva of Chuvashia crowned her successor Anastasia Venza of Moscow Oblast at the end of the event. Venza represented Russia at Miss Universe 2025.

== Contestants ==
50 contestants competed in Miss Russia 2025:

#	Representing	Name	Age	Result
1	Tambov Oblast	Viktoria Grigorova	21	
2	Rostov-on-Don	Elizaveta Maslova	18	Top 10
3	Penza	Alena Mikhailova	19	Top 10
4	Yessentuki	Viktoria Dogayeva	23	
5	Tolyatti	Milana Shuvalova	18	Top 20
6	Chuvashia	Viktoria Pavlova	20	
7	Novosibirsk	Alisa Vishnevskaya	21	
8	Orenburg	Liana Tabuldina	22	
9	Krasnodar	Alisa Oganezova	23	
10	Ufa	Sofia Byakova	20	
11	Nizhnevartovsk	Aleksandra Serdyuk	22	
12	Dubna	Adelina Vertunova	20	Top 20
13	Moscow Oblast	Anastasia Venza	22	Miss Russia 2025
14	Yakutia	Valentina Mikhailova	20	Top 20
15	Tver	Daria Sergeyeva	21	
16	Karelia	Maria Aleshko	22	Top 10
17	Novosibirsk Oblast	Ekaterina Mineeva	23	
18	Ulyanovsk	Daria Libina	21	
19	Novy Urengoy	Adelia Lapova	20	Top 20
20	Yalta	Viktoria Alymova	18	Top 10
21	Yekaterinburg	Dina Safina	23	
22	Nizhny Novgorod	Ekaterina Kulagova	20	
23	Saint Petersburg	Daria Zamanskaya	21	Top 20
24	Cheboksary	Ekaterina Martynova	20	
25	Altai Krai	Zoya Nokhrina	22	
26	Bashkortostan	Eliza Suleymanova	18	
27	Kazan	Ekaterina Gaynullina	21	Top 20
28	Samara Oblast	Elizaveta Rozenfeld	23	
29	Krasnogorsk	Ekaterina Iglina	20	
30	Kerch	Alena Lesnyak	20	1st Runner-Up
31	Sochi	Nicole Chukhontseva	21	Top 20
32	Kaluga	Albina Kolchugina	18	Top 10
33	Chelyabinsk	Polina Lavrenyuk	20	Top 10
34	Tatarstan	Alberta Abdrakhmanova	18	Top 20
35	Nizhny Novgorod Oblast	Anastasia Kudryashova	22	
36	Sestroretsk	Viktoria Makarova	20	2nd Runner-Up
37	Khanty-Mansiysk	Maria Rytkina	23	
38	Leningrad Oblast	Anna Ryakina	23	
39	Simferopol	Alina Plakhotnyuk	19	Top 20
40	Novorossiysk	Maria Vadkovskaya	18	
41	Chelyabinsk Oblast	Polina Bolshukhina	19	
42	Pskov	Valeria Zaytseva	18	Top 20
43	Mari El	Anna Stepanova	18	
44	Vladivostok	Sofia Tsovbun	21	
45	Yaroslavl	Viktoria Mladova	21	Top 10
46	Crimea	Anna Obraztsova	18	
47	Moscow	Kira Artamonova	18	
48	Kaliningrad	Alyona Gendeleva	18	
49	Tula Oblast	Anna Zhulikova	23	
50	Stavropol Krai	Tatiana Dogayeva	23	

== Judges ==
The judges for the competition were:

- Oxana Fedorova – Miss Russia 2001 and Miss Universe 2002
- Dmitry Malikov – Singer
- Tatiana Kotova – Miss Russia 2006
- Vladimir Matetsky – Composer
- Anastasia Belyak – Miss Russia national director
- Igor Chapurin – Fashion designer
- Igor Kimyashov – Hairstylist
