= Miss Russia 2023 =

29th edition of the Miss Russia competition

- Date: 8 October 2023
- Presenters: Sasha Maslakova; Maxim Privalov
- Entertainment: Hanna; Stas Piekha; Nyusha
- Venue: Barvikha Luxury Village, Moscow, Russia
- Entrants: 50
- Placements: 20
- Winner: Margarita Golubeva; Saint Petersburg

Miss Russia 2023 (Russian: Мисс Россия 2023, romanized: Miss Rossiya 2023) was the 29th edition of the Miss Russia pageant. The competition was held on 8 October 2023 at Barvikha Luxury Village in Moscow.

Anna Linnikova of Orenburg crowned Margarita Golubeva of Saint Petersburg as her successor at the end of the event. Golubeva represented Russia at Miss Universe 2023.

== Results ==
=== Placements ===
Placement	Contestant
Miss Russia 2023	Saint Petersburg – Margarita Golubeva §
1st Runner-Up	Tolyatti – Elizaveta Dudina
2nd Runner-Up	Yakutia – Lyubov Khokholova §
Top 10	Kirovo-Chepetsk – Varvara Shutova §; Krasnodar Krai – Ksenia Zakharchenko §; Mari El – Anastasia Antonova §; Moscow – Polina Polenovich; Perm – Anastasia Omelina §; Tyumen – Aleksandra Stashkevich §; Udmurtia – Anastasia Teterina
Top 20	Chita – Arina Filippova; Karelia – Anfisa Popova; Kazan – Ekaterina Morozova; Krasnodar – Anastasia Vesninova; Moscow Oblast – Anastasia Minayeva §; Nizhnekamsk – Kamilla Garipova; Odintsovo – Ekaterina Smilyanets §; Samara Oblast – Vlada Prilepina; Tuva – Ariana Akhmetova §; Yekaterinburg – Alyona Kharlanova

§ – Qualified to the Top 20 via the fan vote.

== Contestants ==
50 contestants competed in Miss Russia 2023:

#	Representing	Name	Age	Result
1	Tolyatti	Elizaveta Dudina	20	1st Runner-Up
2	Kazan	Ekaterina Morozova	22	Top 20
3	Nizhny Novgorod	Maria Budnyakova	22	
4	Chelyabinsk	Sofia Kovrizhinkova	19	
5	Orenburg Oblast	Ekaterina Vorobyeva	21	
6	Tyumen Oblast	Elizaveta Efremova	19	
7	Birobidzhan	Elizaveta Oleksina	22	
8	Dagestan	Marianna Aliyeva	22	
9	Yemanzhelinsk	Ksenia Pogozhina	21	
10	Perm	Anastasia Omelina	19	Top 10
11	Krasnodar Krai	Ksenia Zakharchenko	22	Top 10
12	Tyumen	Aleksandra Stashkevich	18	Top 10
13	Nizhnekamsk	Kamilla Garipova	22	Top 20
14	Mari El	Anastasia Antonova	23	Top 10
15	Primorsky Krai	Viktoria Fedorishcheva	22	
16	Tambov	Anastasia Klimova	18	
17	Karelia	Anfisa Popova	19	Top 20
18	Stavropol	Sofya Khropal	19	
19	Krasnodar	Anastasia Vesninova	18	Top 20
20	Yaroslavl	Alina Prismareva	20	
21	Tuva	Ariana Akhmetova	18	Top 20
22	Tver	Ulyana Odintsova	18	
23	Sochi	Elizaveta Vasilenko	20	
24	Omsk	Daria Beznoshchenko	18	
25	Moscow	Polina Polenovich	23	Top 10
26	Chita	Arina Filippova	20	Top 20
27	Novosibirsk Oblast	Milena Kislova	18	
28	Samara	Polina Matrenina	23	
29	Nalchik	Evelina Shogenova	20	
30	Odintsovo	Ekaterina Smilyanets	22	Top 20
31	Bashkortostan	Tatiana Politova	22	
32	Kabardino-Balkaria	Dayana Ivanova	18	
33	Yakutia	Lyubov Khokholova	22	2nd Runner-Up
34	Yekaterinburg	Alyona Kharlanova	23	Top 20
35	Khakassia	Milena Vatsik	22	
36	Orenburg	Eva Avramenko	20	
37	Magnitogorsk	Anastasia Isayeva	20	
38	Chuvashia	Anna Elizaveta Mits	20	
39	Moscow Oblast	Anastasia Minayeva	18	Top 20
40	Ivanovo	Valeria Lukina	23	
41	Udmurtia	Anastasia Teterina	22	Top 10
42	Irkutsk	Anna Chernenko	18	
43	Kirovo-Chepetsk	Varvara Shutova	19	Top 10
44	Samara Oblast	Vlada Prilepina	21	Top 20
45	Altai Krai	Anzhelika Grigoryevskaya	22	
46	Saint Petersburg	Margarita Golubeva	22	Miss Russia 2023
47	Novosibirsk	Yulia Kolmakova	23	
48	Cherepovets	Zlata Sokolova	19	
49	Rostov-on-Don	Arina Morgunova	19	
50	Tatarstan	Radelya Akhmetshina	21	

== Judges ==
The judges for the competition were:

- Anastasia Belyak – Miss Russia director
- Igor Chapurin – fashion designer
- Oxana Fedorova – Miss Universe 2002 and Miss Russia 2001
- Tatiana Kotova – Miss Russia 2006
- Dmitry Malikov – singer
- Vladimir Matetsky – composer
