= Alexandra Petrova =

Russian model (1980–2000)

- Александрa Петрова
- Petrova at Miss Russia 1996 representing Cheboksary
- Born: Alexandra Valeryevna Petrova; 18 September 1980; Cheboksary, Chuvash ASSR, Russian SFSR, USSR
- Died: 16 September 2000 (aged 19); Cheboksary, Russia
- Occupation: Model
- Height: 1.80 m (5 ft 11 in)
- Beauty pageant titleholder
- Title: Miss Russia 1996
- Hair color: Brown
- Eye color: Blue
- Major competitions: Miss Russia 1996 (Winner); Miss Universe 1999 (Unplaced)

Alexandra Valeryevna Petrova (Russian: Александра Валерьевна Петрова; 18 September 1980 – 16 September 2000) was a Russian model and beauty pageant titleholder who was crowned Miss Russia 1996. She later competed in Miss Universe 1999, where she was unplaced.

== Life and career ==
Petrova was born in Cheboksary, Chuvash ASSR to parents Valery Petrov and Tatyana Petrova. At age fourteen, she began studying at the Cheboksary School of Modeling, and later began taking part in beauty pageants.

Petrova represented the city of Cheboksary in the Miss Russia 1996 competition, held in Veliky Novgorod. She went on to win the competition, at only sixteen years old. During her reign, she was also crowned Miss Model International. After her reign as Miss Russia ended, she crowned Yelena Rogozhina as her successor. Petrova was later offered a contract with Ford Models, but declined due to the fact that they would have required her to lose weight, learn English, and cut her hair short. Petrova went on to represent Russia in the Miss Universe 1999 competition, where she was unplaced.

== Death ==
On 16 September 2000, Petrova was killed by a single gunshot to the head while outside of her apartment in Cheboksary, two days before her 20th birthday. Her boyfriend, Konstantin Chuvilin, and his friend, Radik Akhmetov, were also killed in the attack. It was believed that the assailant had intended to assassinate Chuvilin, a crime boss, and that Petrova was simply a witness to the killing.

She never married and had no children.

Awards and achievements
Preceded by (Kaluga Oblast) Elmira Touyusheva	Miss Russia; 1996	Succeeded by (Samara Oblast) Yelena Rogozhina
Preceded by Anna Malova	Miss Universe Russia; 1999	Succeeded by Svetlana Goreva
