= Miss Central African Republic =

National beauty pageant

- Formation: 2015; 11 years ago
- Purpose: Beauty pageant
- Headquarters: Bangui
- Location: Central African Republic
- Official languages: French
- Leader: COMISCA

Miss Central African Republic (French: Miss Centrafrique) is a national beauty pageant of the Central African Republic. The current Miss Central African Republic 2026 is Aaliyah Fleur Poguy.

== History ==
The Miss Central African Republic pageant is a national beauty contest held to select the country's beauty representative. It was officially established by government decree in 2009.

The competition was suspended during the period of unrest and widespread violence in 2013–2014, when many public and cultural events were disrupted.

An edition of the pageant was held in 2014, but it was marked by significant disruptions and controversies amid ongoing instability. In 2015, the winner, Flora Habiba, emphasized peace and reconciliation and was described in the media as "Miss Central African Republic for peace".

In 2018, the pageant was reinstated with the support of the Wagner Group, The final event was held on 9 December 2018 at the Bangui National Stadium in Bangui, Central African Republic. Miss Russia 2013, Elmira Abdrazakova, was invited to assist in organizing the event.

== Titleholders ==
=== List of winners ===
Beginning in 2024, the winner of each edition receives the title for the following year

Year	Miss Central African Republic	Age (Note: Ages at the time of the pageant)	Region	Ref.
2015	Ursula "Flora" Habiba Nghahally	25	Bangui	
2017	Noémie Guerepou	—N/a	Haute-Kotto	
2018	Solène Charlène Sombo	23	Bangui	
2021	Estime Mbikana (resigned)	—N/a	—N/a	
2024	Emmanuela Jessy Esther Ngaïganazoui	—N/a	Bangui	
2025	Aaliyah Fleur Poguy	20	—N/a	

=== List of runners-up ===
Year	First Runner-Up	Second Runner-Up	Ref.
2015	Sekony Danwili	Fanny Bgelima	
2024	Chrysty Brenda Mandaba	Maeve Mbote	

== Editions ==
Year	License	Date
2014	—N/a	3 July 2014
2015	Tatiana Thoka	21 March 2015
The 2016 edition was cancelled
2017	Olga Yvonne Gouzhy	17 June 2017
2018	Léa Floride Mokodopo	9 December 2018
The 2019–2020 national pageant was cancelled due to the COVID-19 pandemic
2021	Jihane Events	—N/a
No national pageant was held between 2022 and 2023
2024	—N/a	21 December 2024
2025	Liam Groupe	12 December 2025

== International placements ==
Color key

- Declared as Winner
- Ended as runner-up
- Ended as top Finalists
- Ended as one of the Semifinalists
- Ended as special awards winner

Year	Venue	Miss C.A.R.	Placement	Special Award(s)	Ref.
2026	Yaoundé, Cameroon	Emmanuela Ngaïganazoui	Winner at Miss Flambeau D'Afrique		
2015	N'Djamena, Chad	Flora Habiba	2nd Runner-Up at Miss-CEMAC		

== See also ==
- List of beauty pageants
