= Miss Russia 2014 =

22nd edition of the Miss Russia competition

- Date: March 1, 2014
- Presenters: Konstantin Kryukov and Vera Brezhneva
- Venue: Crocus National Exhibition Hall, Moscow
- Broadcaster: STS
- Entrants: 50
- Placements: 20
- Winner: Yulia Alipova; Balakovo

Miss Russia 2014 the 22nd Miss Russia pageant was held at the concert hall at Barvikha Luxury Village in Moscow on March 1, 2014. 50 contestants from all over Russia competed for the crown. Elmira Abdrazakova of Mezhdurechensk crowned her successor, Yulia Alipova, who represented Russia in Miss Universe 2013 and Miss World 2013.

Each year, there are 477 beauty contests in states and cities of Russia to go to compete in the Miss Russia. Each year, 4 months before the national competition, a pre-preliminary happens in Moscow to select the 50 official candidates. In 2014 for the first time, the public selected the 20th semifinalist by Internet votes.

== Contestants ==
The final competition featured 50 contestants representing regions across Russia.

Represents	Contestant	Age	Height	Hometown
Adygean Republic	Medea Kadyrov	23	1.73 m (5 ft 8 in)	Maykop
Astrakhan Oblast	Leah Assanova	22	1.74 m (5 ft 8 1/2 in)	Astrakhan
Balakovo	Yulia Alipova	23	1.79 m (5 ft 10 1/2 in)	Balakovo
Bratsk	Olga Likhanova	23	1.74 m (5 ft 8 1/2 in)	Bratsk
Bryansk Oblast	Julia Mil'shin	20	1.74 m (5 ft 8 1/2 in)	Gordeyevsky
Buryatian Republic	Natalia Beletskaya	18	1.76 m (5 ft 9 1/2 in)	Ulan-Ude
Capital City	Anastasia Reshetova	18	1.77 m (5 ft 9 1/2 in)	Moscow
Cheboksary	Jeanne Tekleva	18	1.84 m (6 ft 1/2 in)	Cheboksary
Chelyabinsk Oblast	Catherine Dorokhova	20	1.75 m (5 ft 9 in)	Katav-Ivanovsky
Chuvash Republic	Bred Alexandra	20	1.82 m (5 ft 11 1/2 in)	Kanash
Ivanovo Oblast	Victoria Kuznetsova	18	1.77 m (5 ft 9 1/2 in)	Lukhsky
Jewish Autonomous Oblast	Oksana Chizhov	22	1.84 m (6 ft 1/2 in)	Smidovich
Kaliningrad Oblast	Victoria Korotkova	19	1.78 m (5 ft 10 in)	Kaliningrad
Kemerovo Oblast	Catherine Feldman	19	1.79 m (5 ft 10 1/2 in)	Anzhero-Sudzhensk
Khanty-Mansiysk Okrug	Angelica Dimitrenko	20	1.79 m (5 ft 10 1/2 in)	Khanty-Mansiysk
Korolev	Elena Machkevich	19	1.79 m (5 ft 10 1/2 in)	Korolev
Krasnodar Krai	Alla Gribova	20	1.83 m (6 ft 0 in)	Krasnodar
Krasnoyarsk Krai	Valeria Chikcha	18	1.78 m (5 ft 10 in)	Krasnoyarsk
Leningrad Oblast	Paolina Kondratieva	22	1.81 m (5 ft 11 1/2 in)	Sosnovy Bor
Magnitogorsk	Anastasia Lavrenova	19	1.74 m (5 ft 8 1/2 in)	Magnitogorsk
Mezhdurechensk	Eugena Potapova	23	1.78 m (5 ft 10 in)	Mezhdurechensk
Mordovian Republic	Valeria Semenchikova	19	1.73 m (5 ft 8 in)	Saransk
Moscow Oblast	Anastasia Shchipanova	22	1.83 m (6 ft 0 in)	Khimki
Novokuznetsk	Yana Sharlay	18	1.74 m (5 ft 8 1/2 in)	Novokuznetsk
Novosibirsk City	Daria Sidorova	22	1.73 m (5 ft 8 in)	Novosibirsk
Novosibirsk Oblast	Xenia Ipatova	18	1.80 m (5 ft 11 in)	Iskitim
Omsk Oblast	Veronica Yakushina	22	1.75 m (5 ft 9 in)	Tyukalinsk
Orenburg City	Xenia Gegel	20	1.73 m (5 ft 8 in)	Orenburg
Penza Oblast	Anastasia Moiseyeva	21	1.83 m (6 ft 0 in)	Kuznetsk
Perm Krai	Anastasia Gareva	18	1.77 m (5 ft 9 1/2 in)	Perm
Rostov Oblast	Anastasia Kostenko	19	1.74 m (5 ft 8 1/2 in)	Zverevo
Rostov-on-Don	Nelly Tolkacheva	21	1.75 m (5 ft 9 in)	Rostov-on-Don
Saint Petersburg	Viktoria Afanasyev	23	1.83 m (6 ft 0 in)	Saint Petersburg
Sakha Republic	Milena Shadrina	21	1.74 m (5 ft 8 1/2 in)	Yakutsk
Saratov City	Daria Prokhorova	18	1.81 m (5 ft 11 1/2 in)	Saratov
Saratov Oblast	Maria Belonogova	23	1.73 m (5 ft 8 in)	Krasnoarmeysk
Sverdlovsk Oblast	Anna Lesun	23	1.77 m (5 ft 9 1/2 in)	Novouralsk
Tambov Oblast	Alina Zhigulina	18	1.78 m (5 ft 10 in)	Rasskazovo
Tatarstan Republic	Dinara Akbasheva	22	1.73 m (5 ft 8 in)	Kazan
Tomsk Oblast	Catherine Mukovnikova	21	1.75 m (5 ft 9 in)	Seversk
Tver City	Irina Maximova	20	1.76 m (5 ft 9 1/2 in)	Tver
Tver Oblast	Maria Hramnikova	21	1.80 m (5 ft 11 in)	Bezhetsky
Tyumen Oblast	Anna Puminova	19	1.73 m (5 ft 8 in)	Tobolsk
Udachny	Alice Usoltseva	20	1.74 m (5 ft 8 1/2 in)	Udachny
Ulyanovsk City	Diana Borisova	21	1.85 m (6 ft 1 in)	Ulyanovsk
Veliky Novgorod	Veronica Bagaeva	23	1.88 m (6 ft 2 in)	Veliky Novgorod
Vladimir Oblast	Anastasia Semenkova	19	1.74 m (5 ft 8 1/2 in)	Kovrov
Vologda Oblast	Alexandra Lavruk	20	1.73 m (5 ft 8 in)	Veliky Ustyug
Yamalo-Nenets Okrug	Victoria Butyrskaja	18	1.79 m (5 ft 10 1/2 in)	Novy Urengoy
Yekaterinburg	Catherine Lokshin	21	1.77 m (5 ft 9 1/2 in)	Yekaterinburg
