= Golovanov =

Golovanov (in Russian Голова́нов, feminine form Golovanova/Голова́нова) is a Russian surname.

People with this surname include:

- Alexander Golovanov (1904–1975), a Soviet pilot and officer
- Alex Golovanov, a Russian Progressive House producer who goes under the name Mango
- Denis Golovanov (born 1979), tennis player
- Diana Golovanov (born 1992), an Israeli musician
- Elizaveta Golovanova (born 1993), Russian beauty pageant titleholder
- K. Golovanov, founder of the Drama and Comedy Theatre in Moscow in 1925, later Gogol Center
- Nikolay Semyonovich Golovanov (1891–1953), a Soviet conductor and composer
- Oleg Golovanov (1934–2019), a Soviet rower
- Vladimir Golovanov (1938–2003), a Soviet weightlifter and Olympic champion
- Yaroslav Golovanov (1932–2003), a Soviet journalist and writer
