= Shishkov =

Shishkov (Russian: Шишко́в, pronounced [ʂɨʂˈkof]) and Shishkova (Russian: Шишко́ва, pronounced [ʂɨʂˈkovə]; feminine) is a common Russian surname.

People with this surname include:

- Alexander Shishkov (1754–1841), Russian statesman, writer, and admiral
- Vyacheslav Shishkov, Russian and Soviet writer
- Evgenia Shishkova (1972–2025), Russian professional pairs figure skater and coach
- Alena Shishkova (born 1992), Russian model
