= Miss Russia 2012 =

20th edition of the Miss Russia competition

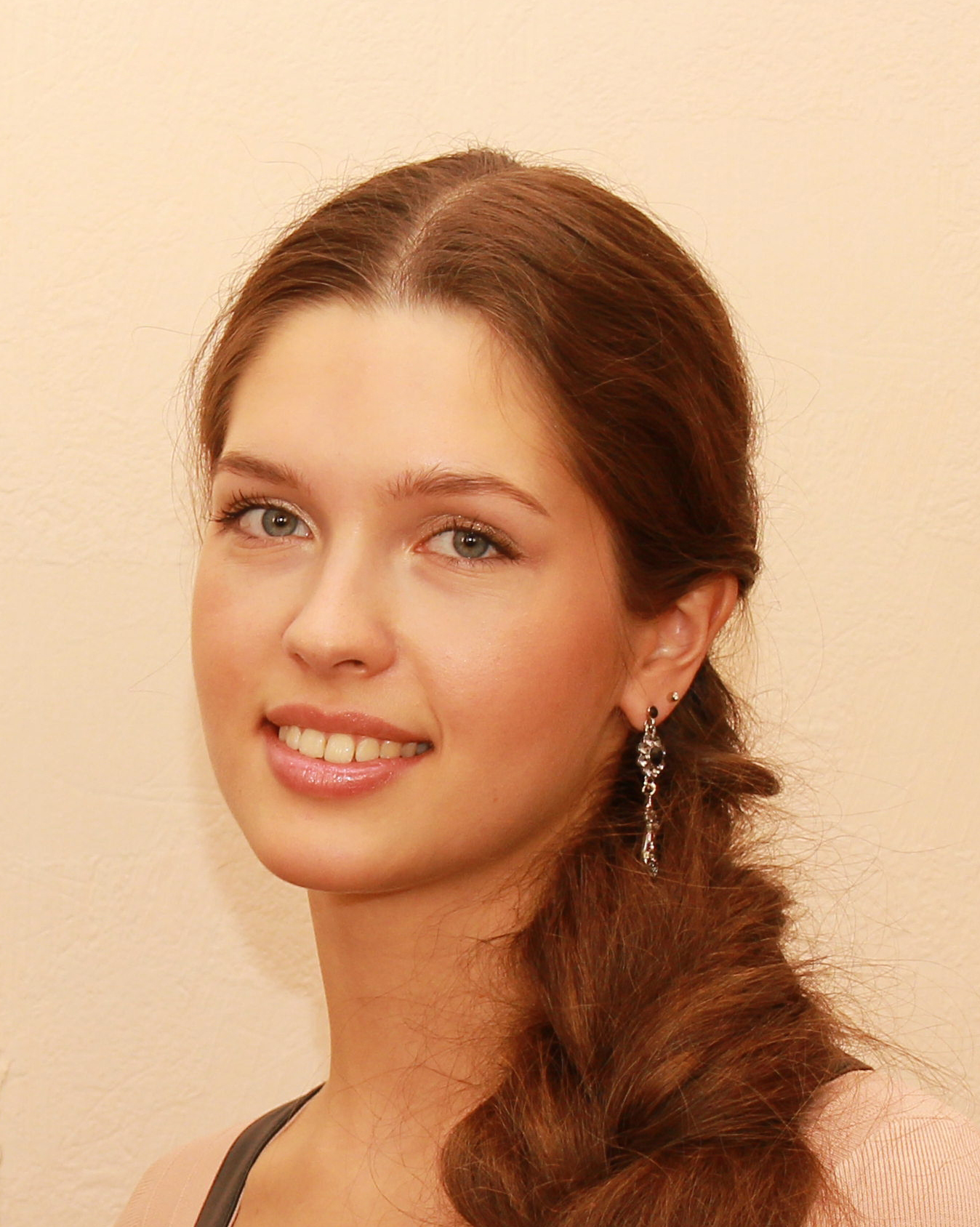
- Miss Russia 2012
- Date: 3 March 2012
- Presenters: Timur Batrutdinov and Julia Kovalchuk
- Venue: Barvikha Luxury Village, Moscow, Russia
- Broadcaster: NTV
- Entrants: 50
- Placements: 15
- Debuts: Atkarsk, Belgorod, Fryazino, Hanty-Mansiysk, Kemerov Oblast, Magadan, Novocheboksarsk, Petropavlovsk-Kamchatsky, Sakhalin Oblast, Severodvinsk, Zheleznodorozhny
- Withdrawals: Chelyabinsk, Chita, Izhevsk, Kazan, Khakasia, Khimki, Korolev, Kurgan, Lipetzk, Mari El Republic, Nizhniy Novgorod, Novokuznetsk, Novorossiisk, Obninsk, Petrozavodsk, Pyatigorsk, Sochi, Tolyatti, Tver, Tula, Tula Oblast, Ussuriisk, Veliky Novgorod, Vladikavkaz, Vologod Oblast, Volzhsky, Yakutsk, Yaroslavl, Yoshkar-Ola, Yuzho-Sakhalinsk
- Returns: Barnaul, Kaliningrad Oblast, Krasnodar, Leningrad Oblast, Mordovia, Murmansk, Novgorod Oblast, Oryol Oblast, Perm Oblast, Perm, Rostov Oblast, Samara Oblast, Sakha Republic, Smolensk Oblast, Stavropol, Surgut, Ulyanovsk, Vladimir, Volgograd Oblast, Yekaterinburg
- Winner: Elizaveta Golovanova; Smolensk Oblast

Miss Russia 2012, the 20th edition of the Miss Russia pageant, was held in a concert hall Barvikha Luxury Village in Moscow on 3 March 2012. 50 contestants from all over the Russia competed for the crown. Natalia Gantimurova of Moscow crowned her successor Elizaveta Golovanova of Smolensk, at the end of the event. Leila Lopes and Ivian Sarcos participated in the event.

== Results ==
=== Placements ===
| Placement | Contestant |
|---|---|
| Miss Russia 2012 | Smolensk Oblast – Elizaveta Golovanova |
| 1st Runner-Up | Zheleznodorozhny – Kristina Gontar |
| 2nd Runner-Up | Tyumen – Alena Shishkova |
| Top 10 | Krasnodar – Anna Shikhobalova; Magadan – Ksenia Potapova; Murmansk Oblast – Ekaterina Grigorieva; Orekhovo-Zuyevo – Anastasia Tekunova; Vladivostok – Viktoria Levina; Volgograd Oblast – Daria Chebotareva; Voronezh – Anastasia Pominova |
| Top 15 | Atkarsk – Veronika Trofimova; Belgorod – Vladlena Radchenko; Novocheboksarsk – Yuliya Ishmuratova; Novosibirsk – Viktoria Egorova; Yekaterinburg – Tatiana Neverova |

== Contestants ==
| Represents | Name | Age | Height |
|---|---|---|---|
| Atkarsk | Veronika Trofimova | 18 | 1.80 m (5 ft 11 in) |
| Barnaul | Maria Galkina | 20 | 1.76 m (5 ft 9 1/2 in) |
| Belgorod City | Vladlena Radchenko | 18 | 1.76 m (5 ft 9 1/2 in) |
| Capital City | Darya Adushkina | 21 | 1.76 m (5 ft 9 1/2 in) |
| Cheboksary | Anastasiya Linkova | 21 | 1.83 m (6 ft 0 in) |
| Fryazino | Ekaterina Plisko | 20 | 1.78 m (5 ft 10 in) |
| Irkutsk City | Ekaterina Plesko | 21 | 1.81 m (5 ft 11 1/2 in) |
| Kaliningrad City | Sofia Nazarenko | 18 | 1.81 m (5 ft 11 1/2 in) |
| Kaliningrad Oblast | Natalia Vaschenko | 21 | 1.77 m (5 ft 9 1/2 in) |
| Kemerovo Oblast | Maria Romanenko | 19 | 1.77 m (5 ft 9 1/2 in) |
| Khabarovsk City | Ksenia Zholudeva | 20 | 1.78 m (5 ft 10 in) |
| Khanty–Mansi Okrug | Veronika Shilova | 20 | 1.76 m (5 ft 9 1/2 in) |
| Krasnodar City | Anna Shikhobalova | 21 | 1.77 m (5 ft 9 1/2 in) |
| Leningrad Oblast | Ekaterina Kolesnikova | 20 | 1.79 m (5 ft 10 1/2 in) |
| Magadan City | Ksenia Potapova | 21 | 1.81 m (5 ft 11 1/2 in) |
| Mordovian Republic | Milana Makeeva | 23 | 1.77 m (5 ft 9 1/2 in) |
| Murmansk Oblast | Ekaterina Grigorieva | 23 | 1.80 m (5 ft 11 in) |
| Novgorod Oblast | Irina Vanyasheva | 21 | 1.81 m (5 ft 11 1/2 in) |
| Novocheboksarsk | Yuliya Ishmuratova | 18 | 1.78 m (5 ft 10 in) |
| Novosibirsk City | Viktoria Egorova | 23 | 1.84 m (6 ft 1/2 in) |
| Orekhovo-Zuyevo | Anastasiya Tekunova | 19 | 1.81 m (5 ft 11 1/2 in) |
| Oryol City | Yulia Fakhrutdinova | 21 | 1.80 m (5 ft 11 in) |
| Oryol Oblast | Elizabeth Starchak | 19 | 1.77 m (5 ft 9 1/2 in) |
| Perm City | Maria Dashkevich | 21 | 1.77 m (5 ft 9 1/2 in) |
| Perm Krai | Alena Pavlova | 18 | 1.78 m (5 ft 10 in) |
| Petropavlovsk-Kamchatsky | Karolina Traktina | 18 | 1.80 m (5 ft 11 in) |
| Rostov Oblast | Ekaterina Zvereva | 22 | 1.75 m (5 ft 9 in) |
| Rostov-on-Don | Viktoria Lesovaya | 18 | 1.76 m (5 ft 9 1/2 in) |
| Saint Petersburg | Ekaterina Maksimova | 22 | 1.78 m (5 ft 10 in) |
| Sakhalin Oblast | Anastasia Li | 18 | 1.79 m (5 ft 10 1/2 in) |
| Samara City | Tatiana Guseva | 19 | 1.77 m (5 ft 9 1/2 in) |
| Samara Oblast | Alexandra Pankratova | 20 | 1.78 m (5 ft 10 in) |
| Saratov City | Maria Kovaleva | 19 | 1.78 m (5 ft 10 in) |
| Severodvinsk | Maria Shchetinina | 20 | 1.80 m (5 ft 11 in) |
| Smolensk Oblast | Elizaveta Golovanova | 18 | 1.78 m (5 ft 10 in) |
| Stavropol City | Margarita Koshkina | 21 | 1.76 m (5 ft 9 1/2 in) |
| Surgut | Inessa Yurinskaya | 21 | 1.76 m (5 ft 9 1/2 in) |
| Tambov City | Svetlana Konobeeva | 20 | 1.81 m (5 ft 11 1/2 in) |
| Tatarstan Republic | Alina Devyateeva | 18 | 1.75 m (5 ft 9 in) |
| Tyumen City | Alena Shishkova | 19 | 1.77 m (5 ft 9 1/2 in) |
| Ulan-Ude | Zhanna Ryabova | 22 | 1.79 m (5 ft 10 1/2 in) |
| Ulyanovsk City | Valentina Demitrova | 18 | 1.75 m (5 ft 9 in) |
| Vladimir City | Ekaterina Tkacheva | 19 | 1.79 m (5 ft 10 1/2 in) |
| Vladivostok | Viktoria Levina | 18 | 1.79 m (5 ft 10 1/2 in) |
| Volgograd City | Anastasiya Ovchinnikova | 20 | 1.78 m (5 ft 10 in) |
| Volgograd Oblast | Daria Chebotareva | 20 | 1.76 m (5 ft 9 1/2 in) |
| Voronezh City | Anastasia Pominova | 19 | 1.76 m (5 ft 9 1/2 in) |
| Yakutsk | Olesya Kondakova-Zakharova | 20 | 1.75 m (5 ft 9 in) |
| Yekaterinburg | Tatiana Neverova | 23 | 1.81 m (5 ft 11 1/2 in) |
| Zheleznodorozhny | Kristina Gontar | 20 | 1.75 m (5 ft 9 in) |
