= Miss Russia 2022 =

28th edition of the Miss Russia competition

- Date: 25 July 2022
- Entertainment: Asiya; Dmitry Malikov
- Broadcaster: Okko
- Entrants: 25
- Placements: 10
- Winner: Anna Linnikova; Orenburg

Miss Russia 2022 the 28th edition of the Miss Russia pageant, was held on 25 July 2022 and was the first edition of the competition to be held since 2019. The pageant was streamed on Okko. Alina Sanko of Azov crowned Anna Linnikova of Orenburg as her successor at the end of the event.

== Results ==
=== Placements ===
Placement	Contestant
Miss Russia 2022	Orenburg – Anna Linnikova
1st Runner-Up	Chuvashia – Anna Budayeva
2nd Runner-Up	Khabarovsk Krai – Daria Nemayeva
Top 10	Chelyabinsk – Anastasia Sofina; Kazan – Lyaysan Tagirova; Moscow – Kristina Sakharova; Rostov-on-Don – Anna Rybalko; Saint Petersburg – Valeria Valuyko; Tatarstan – Anna Semyonovykh; Yekaterinburg – Violetta Sarayeva

== Contestants ==
The 25 contestants were:

#	Representing	Name	Age	Result
1	Chuvashia	Anna Budayeva	19	1st Runner-Up
2	Rostov-on-Don	Anna Rybalko	18	Top 10
3	Nizhnekamsk	Anna Atamanova	18	
4	Chelyabinsk	Anastasia Sofina	19	Top 10
5	Khabarovsk Krai	Daria Nemayeva	19	2nd Runner-Up
6	Ivanovo	Maria Kuznetsova	18	
7	Kazan	Lyaysan Tagirova	22	Top 10
8	Orenburg	Anna Linnikova	22	Miss Russia 2022
9	Penza Oblast	Diana Valyakina	23	
10	Moscow Oblast	Akulina Morozova	19	
11	Cheboksary	Yana Galanina	19	
12	Saint Petersburg	Valeria Valuyko	23	Top 10
13	Moscow	Kristina Sakharova	20	Top 10
14	Sverdlovsk Oblast	Ekaterina Sokolova	21	
15	Udmurtia	Valeria Belyayeva	22	
16	Perm	Ksenia Strelkova	21	
17	Engels	Polina Ivanova	19	
18	Yemanzhelinsk	Yana Krutitskikh	18	
19	Yalta	Anastasia Evmenenko	22	
20	Yekaterinburg	Violetta Sarayeva	20	Top 10
21	Penza	Veronika Fayerovich	22	
22	Tolyatti	Olga Pynu	19	
23	Primorsky Krai	Elizaveta Mits	19	
24	Tver	Natalya Pavlova	19	
25	Tatarstan	Anna Semyonovykh	21	Top 10

== Jury ==
- Dmitry Malikov – singer and musician
- Vladimir Matetsky – composer, producer, and radio presenter
- Maxim Privalov – television and radio presenter
