= Victoria Lopyreva =

Russian actress and model (born 1983)

- Виктория Лопырёва
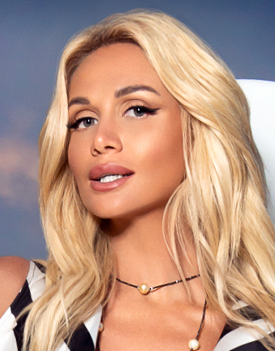
- Born: Viktoriya Lopyryova; Rostov-on-Don, Russian SFSR, USSR
- Occupations: Television presenter; actress; model
- Beauty pageant titleholder
- Title: Miss Russia 2003
- Major competition: Miss Russia 2003 (Winner)

Victoria Lopyreva (Russian: Виктория Лопырёва, romanized: Viktoriya Lopyryova) is a Russian television presenter, actress, model, and beauty pageant titleholder who won Miss Russia 2003. She was an official ambassador of the FIFA World Cup 2018 in Russia.

As a model, Lopyreva has appeared in magazines such as Cosmopolitan, Gala, Future Television, L'Officiel, Beauty, Beauty Unlimited, NRG, OK!, and HELLO!. She also was a director of the Miss Russia pageant for a period of time. In 2006, Lopyreva hosted the Miss Europe pageant held in Ukraine. In 2008, she took part in the Russian version of Survivor, Last Hero.

== Early life ==
Victoria Lopyreva (Russian: Виктория Лопырёва) was born in Rostov-on-Don, Russian SFSR, Soviet Union,

== Model career ==
- Award winner of "Super Model of the World" – 2000
- Miss Russian Photo – 2001
- Miss Russia – 2003

== TV ==
- TV anchor of "Miss Europe Awards" on central European TV channels
- TV anchor of the show "Football Night" on NTV
- TV anchor of the show "The real sport" on Post TV-2009
- TV anchor of the show "Happiness! The video version" on the "U" channel
- TV anchor "Fashion ambulance" on MUZ TV since 2011
- MUZ TV FASHION CHART TV anchor since 2012

== Football ==
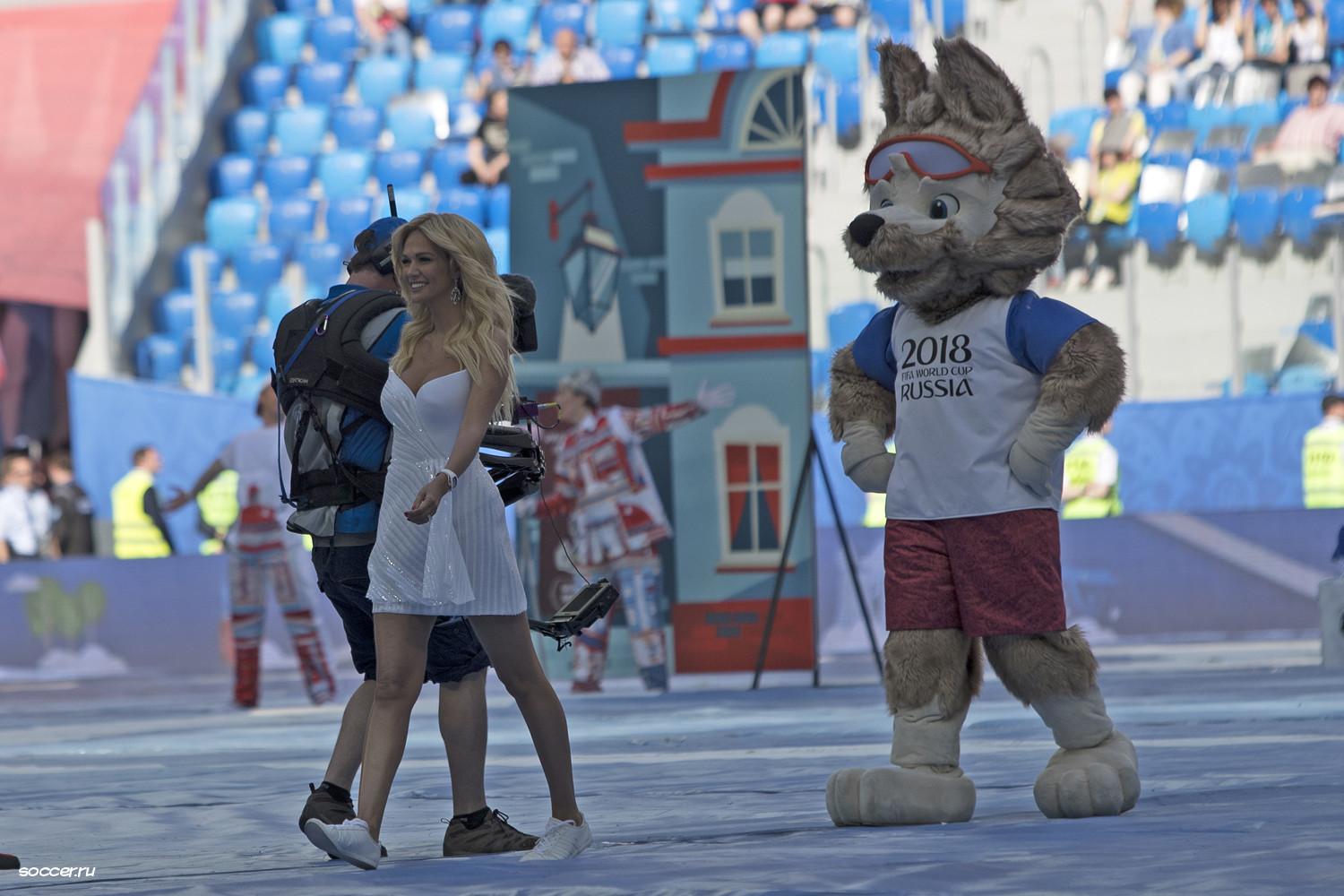
Lopyreva in 2017

Lopyreva was a co-anchor of the "Football Night" TV show in 2007.

Preceded by Svetlana Koroleva	Miss Russia; 2003	Succeeded by Diana Zaripova
