= Miss Europe 2002 =

International beauty pageant

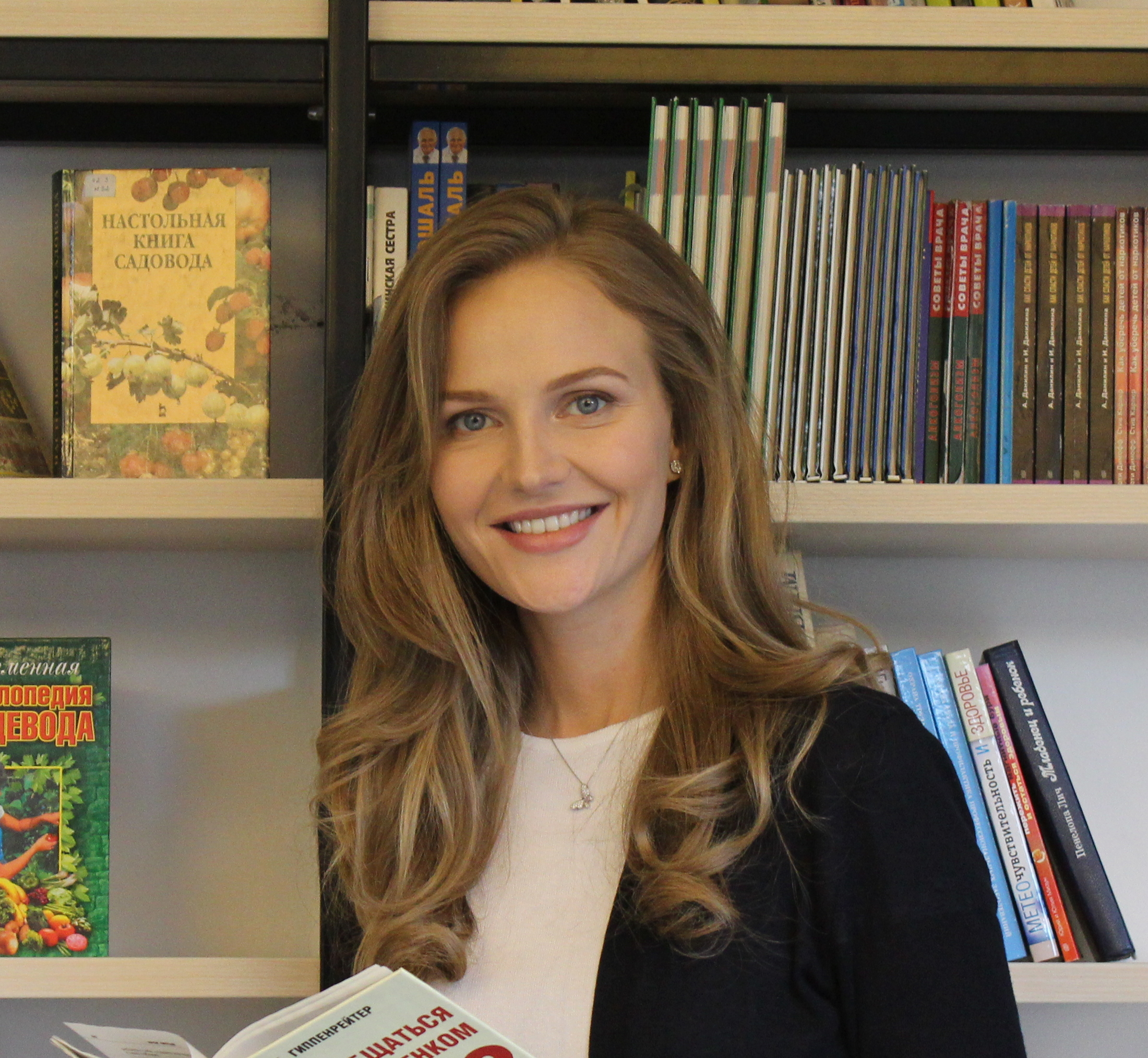
- Svetlana Koroleva
- Date: December 28, 2002
- Presenters: Julien Lepers; Diana Hayden; Joelle Behlock
- Venue: Beirut International Exhibition & Leisure Center, Beirut, Lebanon
- Broadcaster: New TV, TV5
- Entrants: 35
- Placements: 15
- Withdrawals: Macedonia FYRO, Slovenia & Sweden
- Returns: Bulgaria & Great Britain
- Winner: Svetlana Koroleva; Russia

Miss Europe 2002, was the 55th edition of the Miss Europe pageant and the 44th & final edition under the Mondial Events Organization. After this edition Mr. Roger Zeigler (owner of the pageant and Mondial Events Organization) sold the pageant to Endemol France (the French branch of the Dutch company Endemol). This years pageant was held at the Beirut International Exhibition & Leisure Center in Beirut, Lebanon on December 28, 2002. Svetlana Koroleva, Miss Russia, was crowned Miss Europe 2002 by outgoing titleholder Elodie Gossuin of France.

== Results ==
=== Placements ===
Placement	Contestant
Miss Europe 2002	Russia – Svetlana Koroleva
1st Runner-Up	Germany – Natascha Börger
2nd Runner-Up	Turkey – Esra Eron
3rd Runner-Up	Holland – Kim Kötter
4th Runner-Up	Romania – Adina Dimitru
Top 10	Denmark – Tina Christensen; Estonia – Svetlana Makaritseva; France – Louise Prieto; Great Britain – Yana Booth; Poland – Monika Angermann
Top 15	Belarus – Ol'ga Nevdakh; Cyprus – Valentina Christofourou; Greece – Georgia Miha; Lithuania – Raimonda Valinciute; Ukraine – Kataryna Kambova

== Contestants ==
Thirty-five contestants competed for the title.

- Albania – Anjeza Maja
- Armenia – Anna Abrahamyan
- Austria – Nicole Kern
- Belarus – Ol'ga Nevdakh
- Belgium – Sundus Madhloom
- Bosnia and Herzegovina – Branka Cvijanovic
- Bulgaria – Svilena Stoyanova
- Croatia – Ivana Cernok
- Cyprus – Valentina Christofourou
- Czech Republic – Radka Kocurová
- Denmark – Tina Christensen
- Estonia – Svetlana Makaritseva
- Finland – Katariina Kulve
- France – Louise Prieto
- Georgia – Natalia Marikoda
- Germany – Natascha Börger
- United Kingdom – Yana Booth
- Greece – Georgia Miha
- Holland – Kim Kötter
- Hungary – Edit Fried
- Iceland – Berglind Óskarsdóttir
- Latvia – Zanda Zarina
- Lithuania – Raimanda Vlinciute
- Malta – Tiziana Mifsud
- Republic of Moldova – Elena Streapunina
- Norway – Fay Larsen
- Poland – Monika Angermann
- Romania – Adina Dimitru
- Russia – Svetlana Koroleva
- San Marino – Melania Astolfi
- Slovakia – Hnana Burianova
- Spain – Gemma Ruiz Garcia
- Turkey – Esra Eron
- Ukraine – Kataryna Kambova
- Serbia and Montenegro – Olga Bozovic
