= Valentina Alekseeva =

Russian model and beauty queen

- Валентина Алексеева
- Born: Valentina Andreevna Alekseeva; 11 August 2006 (age 20); Cheboksary, Russia
- Education: Russian National Research Medical University
- Occupation: Model
- Height: 1.79 m (5 ft 10 in)
- Beauty pageant titleholder
- Title: Miss Chuvashia 2023; Miss Russia 2024; Miss Brics 2026
- Major competitions: Miss Russia 2024; (Winner); Miss Universe 2024; (Top 12); Miss Brics 2026; (Winner)

Valentina Andreevna Alekseeva (Russian: Валентина Андреевна Алексеева; born 11 August 2006) is a Russian model and beauty pageant titleholder who was crowned Miss Russia 2024. As Miss Russia, Alekseeva represented Russia at Miss Universe 2024, where she placed in the top 12.

== Early life and education ==
Alekseeva was born on 11 August 2006 in Cheboksary to parents Andrey Alekseev and Olga Alekseeva. Her mother also competed in pageantry, and won the title of Vice-Mrs. Chuvashia 2023. Alekseeva also has a younger brother named Ivan. From a young age, Alekseeva was interested in biology and ecology, and regularly participated in the All-Russian Olympiad of schoolchildren as a child. After studying at Lyceum No. 44 in Cheboksary, Alekseeva transferred to Gymnasium No. 5 as her prior school did not offer classes in chemistry or biotechnology. Alekseeva ultimately graduated from secondary school in 2024, receiving a gold medal for her score of 280 on the Unified State Exam.

After completing her secondary education, Alekseeva relocated to Moscow to enroll in the Russian National Research Medical University, studying general medicine.

== Pageantry ==
Alekseeva began her modeling and pageantry career in 2023, aged 16, after seeing an advertisement for a casting by the modeling agency Volga Models on social media. She ultimately was selected by the agency, and was later crowned Miss Chuvashia 2023 after receiving only one month of training in modeling. Following her victory, Alekseeva also participated in the Miss Tourism Russia 2023 pageant, but afterwards paused her modeling and pageantry career in order to focus on her education.

=== Miss Russia 2024 ===
After completing her secondary education in 2024, Alekseeva opted to return to pageantry. She applied as a contestant for the Miss Russia 2024 pageant, and ultimately was selected as one of its 50 official contestants, representing Chuvashia. During the competition, Alekseeva launched her charity project Bird of Happiness, which created a fund to help terminally ill children; her project was ultimately awarded as one of the best charity projects in the competition. The pageant was held on 5 October in Moscow, where Alekseeva advanced into the top 20, top 10, and ultimately was crowned the winner. As part of her prize package, Alekseeva received ₽1 million, and announced that she intended to spend part of her winnings on her education and donate the remainder to charity. Upon her victory, Alekseeva became the third representative of Chuvashia to win the Miss Russia title.

=== Miss Universe 2024 ===
As Miss Russia, Alekseeva represented Russia at the Miss Universe 2024 pageant. The pageant was held at the Arena CDMX in Mexico City on 16 November. Alekseeva went on to advance into the initial top 30 semifinalists, before ultimately placing in the top 12; this was the first time that a Russian representative had advanced to the semifinals of a Miss Universe pageant since Elizaveta Golovanova at Miss Universe 2012. The pageant was ultimately won by Victoria Kjær Theilvig of Denmark.

=== Miss BRICS 2026 ===
In 2026, Alekseeva represented Russia at the Miss BRICS International pageant, where she won the title of Miss BRICS 2026. The international competition was held in Kazan, Russia, bringing together contestants from countries associated with the BRICS cultural initiative and partner nations.

Awards and achievements
Preceded by (Saint Petersburg) Margarita Golubeva	Miss Russia; 2024	Succeeded by (Moscow Oblast) Anastasia Venza
Preceded by (Saint Petersburg) Margarita Golubeva	Miss Universe Russia; 2024	Succeeded by (Moscow Oblast) Anastasia Venza
