= Lavanda (song) =

Song by Sofia Rotaru
- Language: Russian
- English title: "Lavender"
- Recorded: 1985
- Genre: Pop music
- Composer: Vladimir Matetsky
- Lyricist: Mikhail Shabrov

"Lavanda" (Russian: Лава́нда, English: Lavender) is one of the major hits of Sofia Rotaru, a popular song for duet performance of 1985. It was first performed on the New Year TV.

The lyrics were written by Mikhail Shabrov and the music was composed by Vladimir Matetsky. This song became the debut of collaboration of Rotaru and with the new author and composer. Rotaru was awarded platinum disc for selling more than one million of copies of the song and the album of the same name.

Leonard Cohen had released a similar tune in December 1984, "Dance Me to the End of Love".

== Performers and covers ==
- Sofia Rotaru and Jaak Joala (USSR 1985, 1986 USSR)
- Rainer Friman and Hirvijärvi Minna ( Finland 1986)
- Milk and Coffee – Mi Manchi (Italy 1986)
- Sofia Rotaru and Philipp Kirkorov (Russia 2001)
- Sofia Rotaru and Nikolay Baskov (Russia 2007)
