= Alena Shishkova =

Russian fashion model (born 1992)

- Алёна Шишкова
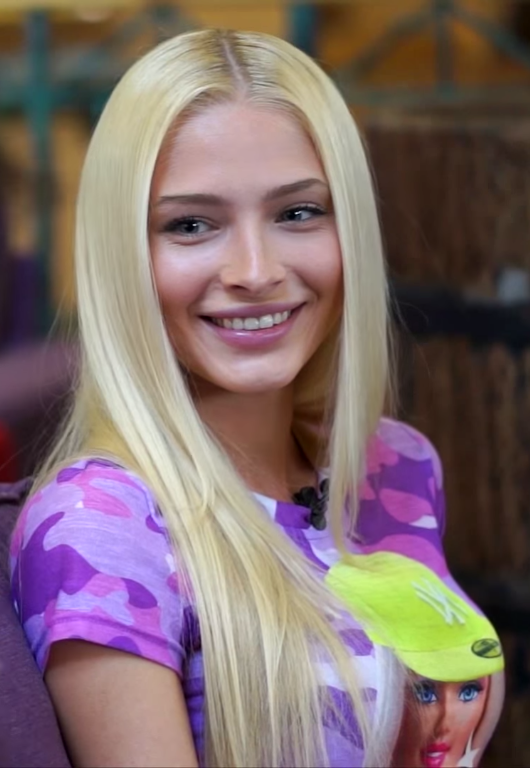
- Born: Alena Shishkova; 12 November 1992 (age 34); Tyumen, Russia
- Occupation: Model
- Years active: 2005–present
- Children: 1
- Modeling information
- Height: 176 cm (5 ft 9 in)
- Hair color: Blonde
- Eye color: Blue

Alena Shishkova (Russian: Алёна Шишкова, pronounced [ɐˈlʲɵnə ʂɨʂˈkovə]; born 12 November 1992) is a Russian glamour model. She has modeled for glamour photo shoots with Russian men's magazine Maxim, commercial advertising campaigns and walked at fashion shows. She appeared in the Miss Russia 2012 beauty pageant of Russia and was crowned Vice Miss Russia.

== Early life ==
Shishkova was born in Tyumen, the daughter of Nadezhda and Alex Shishkov. She attended the Institute of Law, Economics and Management at Tyumen State University, specializing in management.

== Career ==
As an adolescent, she went to a musical arts school, studying vocals and guitar. After shooting for Fashion Collection magazine at the age of 13, she competed in the Image 2008 beauty contest and won the titles "Miss Hope" and "Miss Dream". In 2009, she competed again and won the title "Miss Sunshine". In 2012, she won the title Vice Miss Russia 2012, 2nd place runner up.

Shishkova has carved out an international glamour modeling career working around the globe with international representation. In March 2014, she gave birth to a daughter with the rapper Timati, whom she had been dating since 2012.

In 2017, Telegram featured Alena in its promotional screenshots of the app under the pseudonym Alena Shy.

== Awards and nominations ==
Year	Award	Result
2008	Miss Hope	Won
2008	Miss Dream	Won
2009	Little Miss Sunshine	Won
2010	Supermodel	Nominated
2012	Miss Russia	Runner Up
