= Svetlana Koroleva (model) =

Russian beauty pageant titleholder

- Светлана Королёва
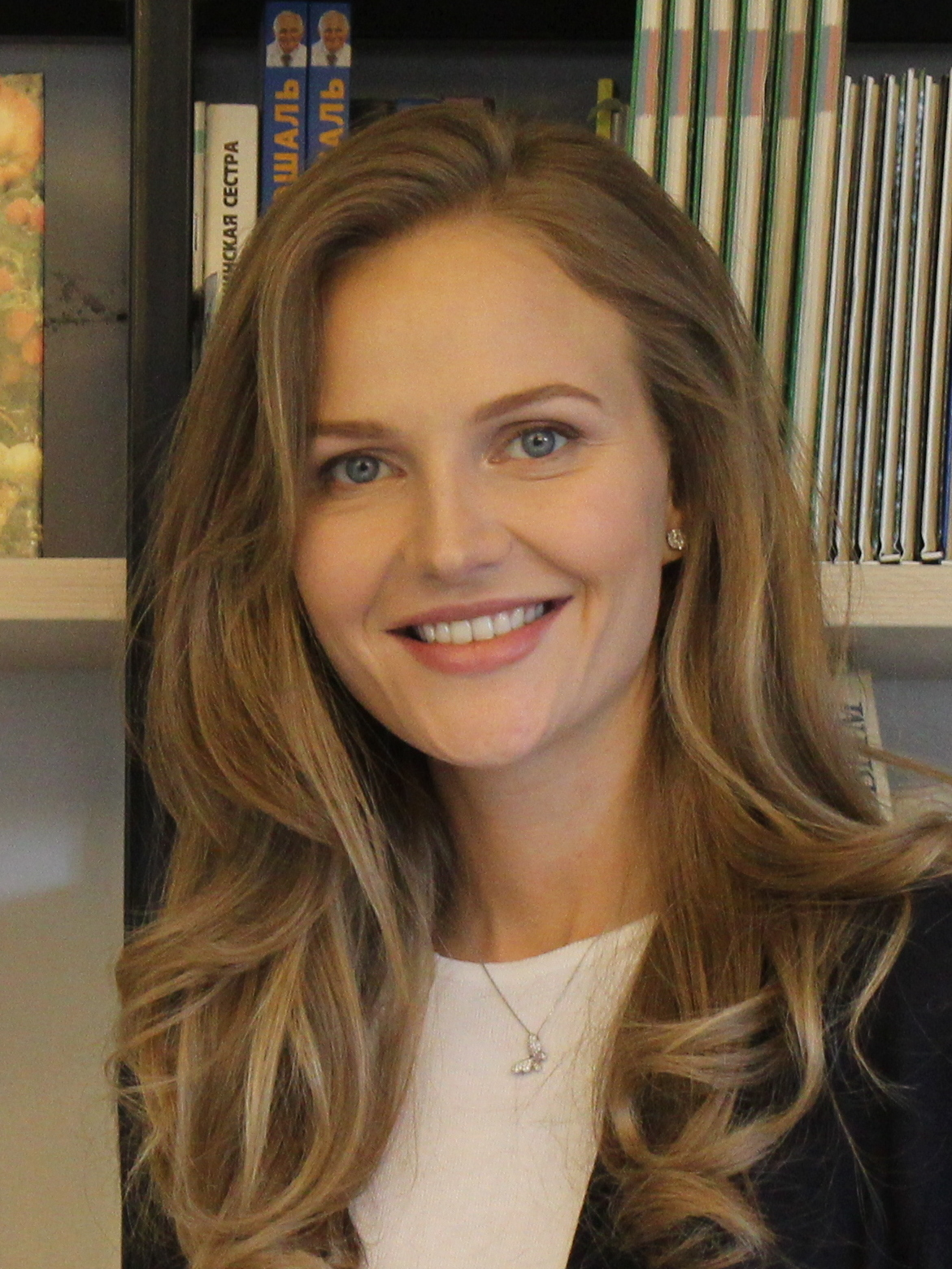
- Height: 1.77 m (5 ft 10 in)
- Beauty pageant titleholder
- Title: Miss Russia 2002; Miss Europe 2002
- Major competitions: Miss Russia 2002 (Winner); Miss Europe 2002 (Winner)

Svetlana Yuryevna Koroleva (Russian: Светлана Юрьевна Королёва) is a Russian beauty pageant titleholder who was crowned Miss Russia in June 2002, competing against 69 other contestants from various regions of Russia. During the pageant, she represented her home city of Petrozavodsk. That same year, she represented Russia at the Miss Europe 2002 pageant and won.

Koroleva attended the technical school for municipal services, where she studied water supply and drainage systems.

Preceded by Oxana Fedorova	Miss Russia; 2002	Succeeded by Victoria Lopyreva
