= Anna Linnikova =

Russian model and beauty queen (born 2000)

- Анна Линникова
- Born: Anna Vladislavovna Linnikova; 4 April 2000 (age 26); Orenburg, Russia
- Education: Saint Petersburg State University
- Beauty pageant titleholder
- Title: Miss Russia 2022
- Major competitions: Miss Russia 2022 (winner); Miss Universe 2022 (unplaced)

Anna Vladislavovna Linnikova (Russian: Анна Владиславовна Линникова; born 4 April 2000) is a Russian beauty pageant titleholder who was crowned Miss Russia 2022. As Miss Russia, Linnikova represented Russia at Miss Universe 2022.

== Early life and education ==
Born on 4 April 2000, Linnikova was raised in Orenburg and began working professionally as a model at age 16. As a professional model, Linnikova has worked under contract in several countries, such as China, Japan, South Korea, Vietnam, and Malaysia. She later moved to Saint Petersburg to attend the Saint Petersburg University of Management Technologies and Economics. Prior to winning Miss Russia 2022, Linnikova was in her second year of university, studying public relations.

== Pageantry ==
Linnikova began her career in pageantry in 2022, after being one of 750,000 women throughout Russia to audition to be a finalist in Miss Russia 2022. She was ultimately selected as an official candidate, representing Orenburg. Linnikova advanced to the top ten in the final held on 25 July 2022, before being declared the winner. As Miss Russia, Linnikova officially represented Russia at Miss Universe 2022.

== Personal life ==
In 2023, Linnikova became engaged to and then subsequently separated from Jackson Hinkle, an American social media influencer known for his pro-Russian views and support of Donald Trump's MAGA movement.

Awards and achievements
| Preceded by Alina Sanko | Miss Russia; 2022 | Succeeded by Margarita Golubeva |
| Preceded by Ralina Arabova | Miss Universe Russia; 2022 | Succeeded by Margarita Golubeva |
