= Elmira Abdrazakova =

Russian model (born 1994)

- Эльмира Абдразакова
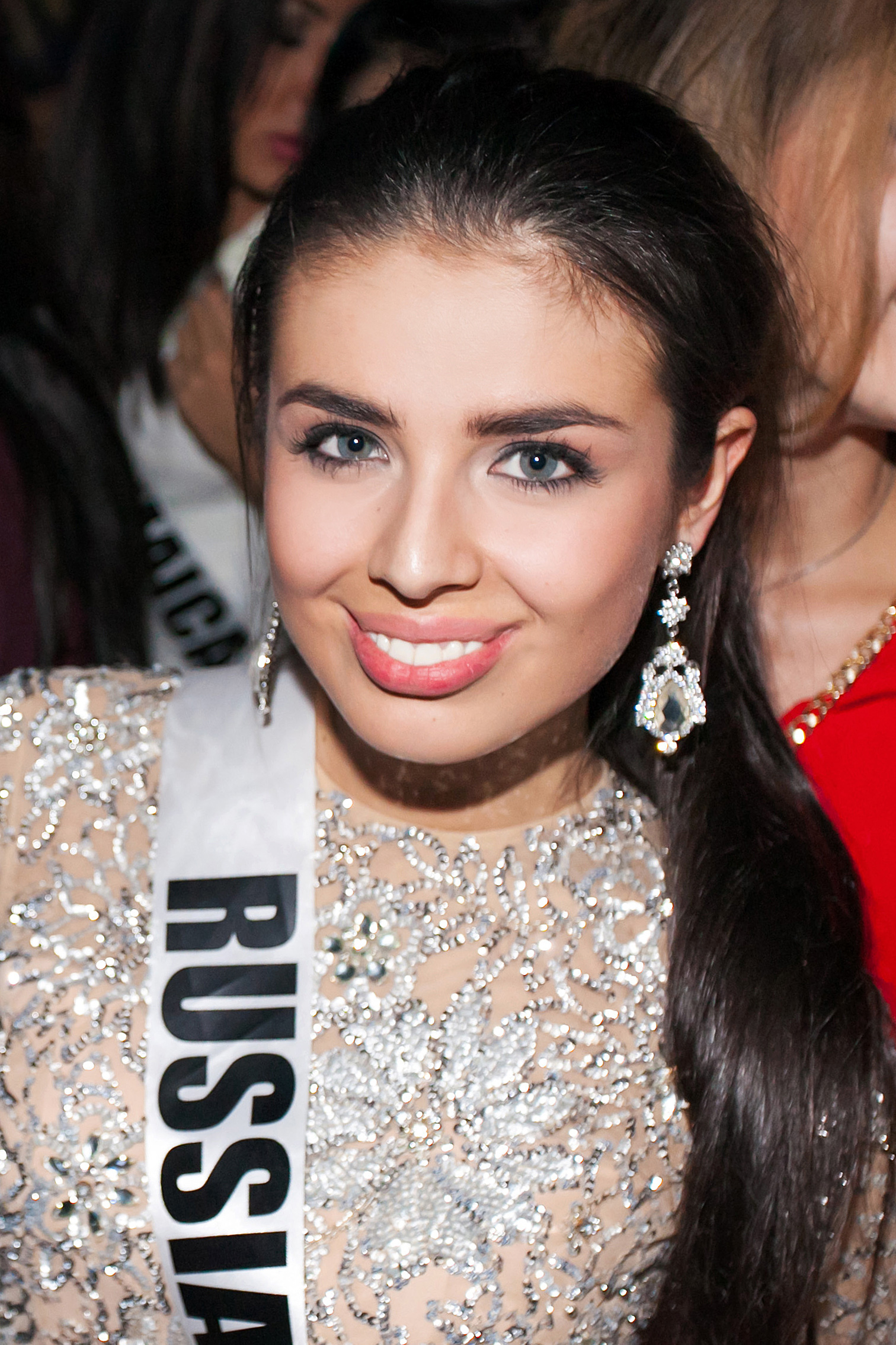
- Born: 7 October 1994 (age 32); Zhelezin District, Pavlodar Province, Kazakhstan
- Height: 1.75 m (5 ft 9 in)
- Beauty pageant titleholder
- Title: Miss Russia 2013
- Hair color: Brown
- Eye color: Green
- Major competitions: Miss Russia 2013 (Winner); Miss World 2013 (Unplaced); Miss Universe 2013 (Unplaced)
- Website: http://www.elmiraabdrazakova.ru

Elmira Rafailovna Abdrazakova (Russian: Эльмира Абдразакова; born 7 October 1994 in Zhelezin District) is a Russian model and beauty pageant titleholder who was crowned Miss Russia 2013 and represented Russia at the Miss Universe 2013 and Miss World 2013 pageants.

== Personal life ==
Born to a Tatar father Rafail Abdrazakov and Russian mother Olga Pshenichnikova, Elmira was raised in Mezhdurechensk, Kemerovo Oblast. Abdrazakova, was invited to assist in the first Miss Central African Republic edition on 9 December 2018 with the Wagner Group.

== Miss Russia 2013 ==
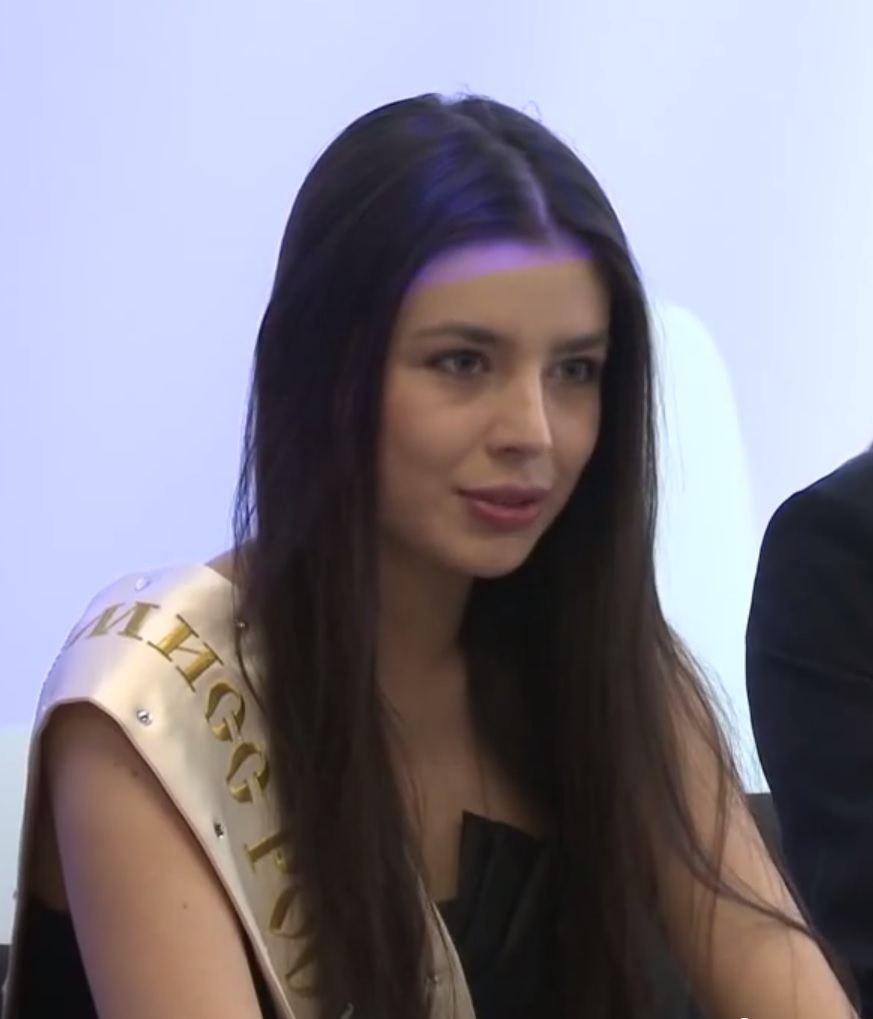
Elmira Abdrazakova wearing her Miss Russia sash in 2013.

Abdrazakova was crowned Miss Russia 2013 at the 21st edition of Miss Russia beauty pageant, held at the Concert Hall Barvikha Luxury Village in Moscow on 2 March 2013. She is 5 ft. 9 ins. (1.75 m) tall. The Miss Russia 2013 final ceremony was televised on the NTV channel on 8 March 2013. The ceremony started with the hit song "Christmas Tree". She was an official representative of Russia at the world's two most prestigious beauty contests, Miss Universe and Miss World.

She was of a victim of racial abuse due to her Tatar background. She closed her social network accounts after repeated abuse by trolls.

== Miss World 2013 ==
Elmira represented Russia at the Miss World 2013 pageant, held in Bali, Indonesia on 9 September 2013. She failed to place in the Top 20.

== Miss Universe 2013 ==
Abdrazakova later represented Russia at the Miss Universe 2013 pageant in Moscow, Russia, her home country.

== Public reaction to the victory ==
Elmira's success in the beauty pageant generated a massive negative response on social media. As Elmira reported at a press conference, she received thousands of messages, most of which included attacks on both her appearance and her ethnic identity. According to Elmira's report, "when she arrived home and looked at her page, she was shocked by the amount of disgruntled comments that Internet users wrote to her". Popular humorous communities posted satirical cartoons. As a result, she was forced to delete her page on the social network VKontakte. However, the page was restored later.

Awards and achievements
Preceded by Elizaveta Golovanova	Miss Russia; 2013	Succeeded by Yulia Alipova
