= Jaak Joala =

Estonian singer

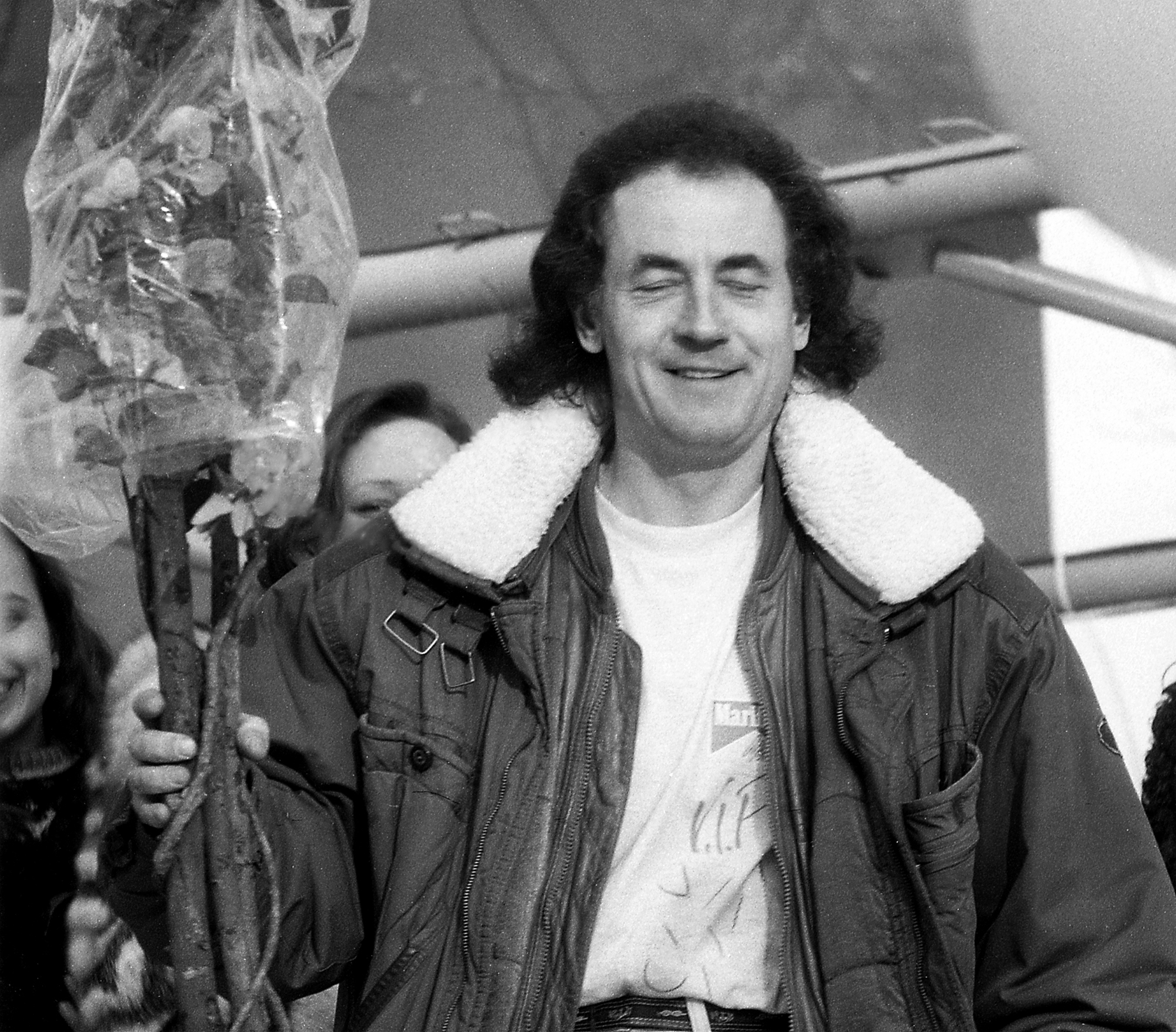
- Joala in 1994
- Born: 26 June 1950; Viljandi, then part of Estonian SSR, Soviet Union
- Died: 25 September 2014 (aged 64); Tallinn, Estonia
- Occupations: Singer, flautist
- Awards

Jaak Joala (26 June 1950 – 25 September 2014) was an Estonian singer, musician and a member of two bands: Kristallid and Virmalised. He began as a flautist, later adding singing and bass guitar.

== Biography ==
=== Early life ===
Jaak Joala was born in Viljandi, Estonia and grew up in Tallinn. His mother, Helgi Ridamäe, was a music teacher at various schools in Tallinn. His father was Arno Joala, who was a musician and who was later also known as a healer. When Jaak turned seven years old, he started to take piano lessons and in adolescence also began taking flute lessons.

=== Career ===
He began his musical career with the beat group Kristallid (English: The Crystals) in 1966 as a flautist, then as a singer and bassist. In 1968, he was the bassist and lead singer in the popular group Virmalised (English: Northern Lights). With Virmalised, he sang several of Toivo Kurmet's songs: Ainult sul (Only You Have), Ma ei tea, miks (I Don't Know Why), Naer (Laughter), Taas on päev (Once Again The Day) and Üksinda (Alone). Joala introduced western rock music to Estonian and Soviet audiences by singing in his native language.

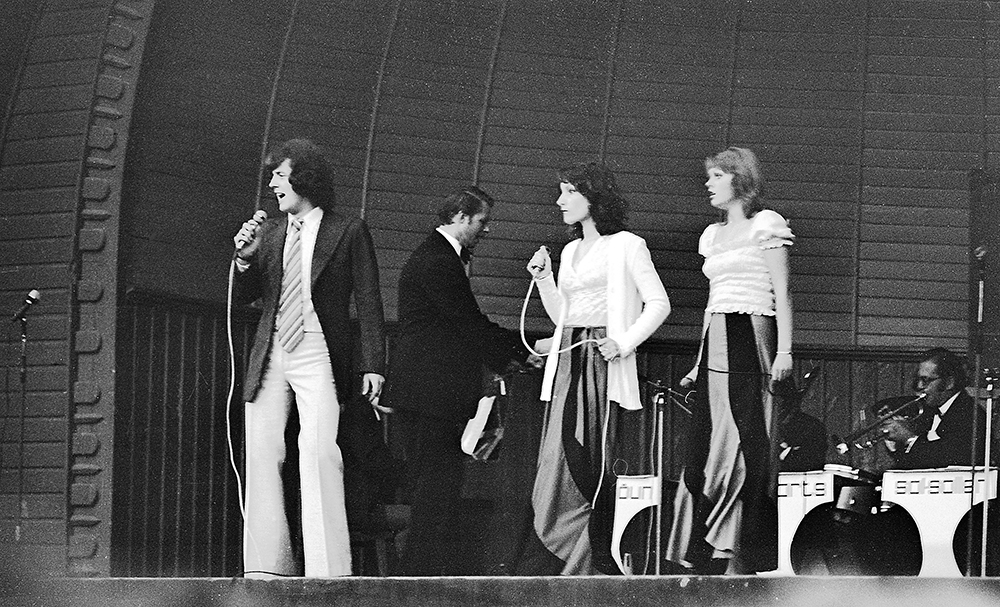
Joala performing in Tallinn in 1974

In the 1980s, he earned the nickname Kremlin's Nightingale because he often performed and recorded in Russia, and a large part of his repertoire, comprising songs written by such composers as Raimonds Pauls, David Tukhmanov and Alexander Zatsepin, at that time was sung in Russian.

Joala's bandmate Paap Kõlar recounted that eventually Joala grew tired of performing, saying that Goskontsert, the Soviet entertainment agency, demanded that he perform. Kõlar suggested that Joala did not have much choice as to whether to perform or not.

=== Later career ===
In the 1990s, Joala's most well-known projects as a singer were with Kollane Allveelaev G (English: Yellow Submarine G). They performed 1960s music along with Ivo Linna, Karl Madis, Meelis Punder and others. In the middle of the 1990s he performed in joint concerts with Ivo Linna and Tõnis Mägi. The concert tour was informally nicknamed The Three Tenors Tour. After the 1990s Joala devoted his time to teaching, producing and hosting on TV/radio. In the last ten years of his life he was largely reclusive.

== Death ==
He died on 25 September 2014. He was buried in the Forest Cemetery of Tallinn.

== Popular songs ==
- Naerata (Smile)
- Öö Chicagos (Night In Chicago)
- Suveöö (Summer Night)
- Unustuse jõel (On The River Of Forgetting)
- Suvi (Summer)
- Я тебя рисую (Ya tebya risuyu)
- Подберу музыку (Podberu muzyku)
- Лаванда (Lavanda), duet with Sofia Rotaru
- Фотографии любимых (Fotogafii lyubimykh)
- Свадебные кони (Svadbenie koni)

== Acknowledgements ==
- Merited Artist of the Estonian SSR (1980)
