= Natalia Gantimurova =

Russian beauty pageant titleholder (born 1991)

Natalia Gantimurova Наталья Гантимурова
- Born: Natalia Gantimurova; 14 August 1991 (age 35); Chelyabinsk, Russian SFSR, Soviet Union
- Height: 1.81 m (5 ft 11 1/2 in)
- Beauty pageant titleholder
- Title: Miss Russia 2011
- Hair color: Brown
- Eye color: Blue
- Major competitions: Miss Universe 2011 (Unplaced); Miss World 2011 (Top 30)

Natalia Sergeyevna Gantimurova (Russian: Наталья Серге́евна Гантимурова; born 14 August 1991) is a Russian beauty pageant titleholder who was crowned Miss Russia 2011 and represented her country at the 2011 Miss Universe and Miss World pageants.

== Early life ==
Gantimurova is a descendant of the Russian princely family of Evenki Gantimurov. She was born in Chelyabinsk to Sergei Gantimurov and Svetlana Nosyreva. Gantimurova was pursuing a bachelor's degree in international relations at the Russian State University for the Humanities and knew two foreign languages. She also enjoys snowboarding.

== Miss Russia 2011 ==
Gantimurova, who stands 1.81 m (5 ft 11 1/2 in) tall, competed as the representative of Moscow, one of 50 finalists in her country's national beauty pageant, Miss Russia, held on 5 March 2011, in Barvikha. She won the title, gaining the right to represent Russia at Miss Universe 2011 and Miss World 2011.

== Miss Universe and Miss World 2011 ==
As the official representative of her country at the 2011 Miss Universe pageant, held in São Paulo, Brazil, on 12 September 2011, Gantimurova competed to succeed the Miss Universe titleholder, Ximena Navarrete of Mexico, but was unplaced. She later competed in Miss World 2011 in London, United Kingdom on 6 November 2011, but placed in the top 30.

Awards and achievements
Preceded by Irina Antonenko	Miss Russia; 2011	Succeeded by Elizaveta Golovanova
