= Anna Malova =

Russian model (born 1974)

- Born: Anna Malova c. 1974; Yaroslavl, Russia
- Height: 1.79 cm (0.70 in)
- Beauty pageant titleholder
- Title: Miss Baltic Sea 1994; Miss Russia 1998
- Hair color: blonde
- Eye color: green

Anna Malova (Russian: Анна Малова) is a Russian model and beauty pageant titleholder who was appointed as Miss Russia 1998 and competed at Miss Universe 1998 and placed Top 10.

== Biography ==
As a child, Anna was engaged in artistic gymnastics. She finished school in Yaroslavl. After high school, Anna was admitted to the Yaroslavl Medical Institute at the Medical Faculty in psychotherapy. She trained as a doctor in Russia but has not licensed to practice in the United States.

The first major step for Malova as a model was the "Ford Supermodel of Russia 1993" contest which was held in Moscow in late November 1992. In 1993, she took part in the regional competition Miss Volga 1993 where she became 1st runner-up and was invited to the Miss Russia 1993 pageant - where she came in second. Then she won the title of Miss Baltic Sea 1994 in Finland and competed in the Miss World 1994 pageant in Sun City where she didn't place.

In 1995, she left Moscow, spent six weeks learning English in Florida, where she met Donald Trump, who at the time was still married to his second wife, Marla Maples. In 1996, Malova moved to New York City into a condominium in Trump Tower on Fifth Avenue. That October, Trump acquired three beauty pageants from ITT Corp.: Miss Universe, Miss USA, and Miss Teen USA.

In 1998, she was appointed as "Miss Russia" to compete in the Miss Universe pageant and made it to the Top 10 of the Miss Universe 1998 pageant in Honolulu. But the very fact she had even entered the pageant was - as New York magazine noticed - an anomaly. After the pageant she became a popular socialite girl in New York, and was the face of some commercials and advertising such as Chopard and Home Shopping Network. Malova signed up with Karin Models, which had been founded by Jeffrey Epstein's friend Jean-Luc Brunel. Malova was once romantically linked to hedge-fund billionaire George Soros, as well as comedian Garry Shandling.

In 2010, Malova was accused of stealing prescription pads from doctors, and writing herself prescriptions for anti-anxiety drugs. She was subsequently jailed for failing to attend a drug-treatment programme.

In 2019, a federal judge in New York released flight logs that showed she flew on board Epstein's private Boeing 727 with Epstein's close friend Ghislaine Maxwell and Prince Andrew, Duke of York from Epstein's Little St. James private island in the Virgin Islands back to Florida in February 1999.

| Preceded by Yelena Rogozhina | Miss Russia; 1998 | Succeeded by Anna Kruglova |
