= Margarita Golubeva =

Russian model and beauty queen

- Маргарита Голубева
- Born: Margarita Aleksandrovna Golubeva; 3 May 2001 (age 25); Saint Petersburg, Russia
- Education: Moscow State Art and Cultural University
- Occupations: Model; singer
- Height: 1.76 m (5 ft 9 in)
- Beauty pageant titleholder
- Title: Miss Student Russia 2021; Miss Europe Russia 2023; Miss Russia 2023
- Major competitions: Miss Europe 2023; (1st Runner-Up); Miss Russia 2023; (Winner); Miss Universe 2023; (Unplaced)

Margarita Aleksandrovna Golubeva (Russian: Маргарита Александровна Голубева; born 3 May 2001) is a Russian model, singer, and beauty pageant titleholder who was crowned Miss Russia 2023. As Miss Russia, Golubeva represented Russia at Miss Universe 2023.

== Early life and education ==
Golubeva was born on 3 May 2001 in Saint Petersburg to a mother who worked as a doctor and a father who worked as an engineer, and was raised in an ordinary family with three younger brothers and sisters. She began taking lessons in singing and dancing at age five. At age 15, Golubeva decided to pursue a career as an actress and signed up to audition for a dumpling commercial. After accidentally walking into the wrong office, she arrived at a casting for a modeling agency and ultimately was signed to the agency, beginning her modeling career. While in school, Golubeva was bullied for her tall height and appearance, and she did not become confident in her appearance until realizing it was considered an asset in the modeling world.

Prior to winning Miss Russia, Golubeva was a fifth-year student at the Russian Customs Academy of the Federal Customs Service of Russia in Moscow and a second-year student at the Moscow State Art and Cultural University in Khimki, studying pop-jazz singing at the latter institution. In 2021, she was a contestant on season ten of the Russian version of the singing competition television series The Voice, although she did not advance past the first round. Her experience on The Voice inspired her to enroll in the Moscow State Art and Cultural University as a music student.

== Pageantry ==
Golubeva began her pageantry career in 2021, after being crowned Miss Student Russia 2021. In 2023, she was selected as the Russian representative for Miss Europe 2023, where she went on to place as the first runner-up.

=== Miss Russia 2023 ===
In 2023, Golubeva registered for the Miss Russia 2023 pageant, having aspired to compete in the pageant since she was 16 years old. She was ultimately selected as one of its 50 finalists out of over 85,000 applicants, representing Saint Petersburg. Prior to the competition's final show, Golubeva was one of the ten contestants who received the most online votes from the Russian public, thus allowing her direct admission into the pageant's Top 20. The competition was held on 8 October in Moscow, where Golubeva advanced further into the Top 10, and later was crowned the winner. As part of her prize package, Golubeva was awarded ₽1 million, in addition to other prizes.

As Miss Russia, Golubeva represented Russia at Miss Universe 2023.

Awards and achievements
| Preceded by (Orenburg) Anna Linnikova | Miss Russia; 2023 | Succeeded by (Chuvashia) Valentina Alekseeva |
| Preceded by (Orenburg) Anna Linnikova | Miss Universe Russia; 2023 | Succeeded by (Chuvashia) Valentina Alekseeva |
