= Elizaveta Golovanova =

Russian model and beauty pageant titleholder

- Елизавета Голованова
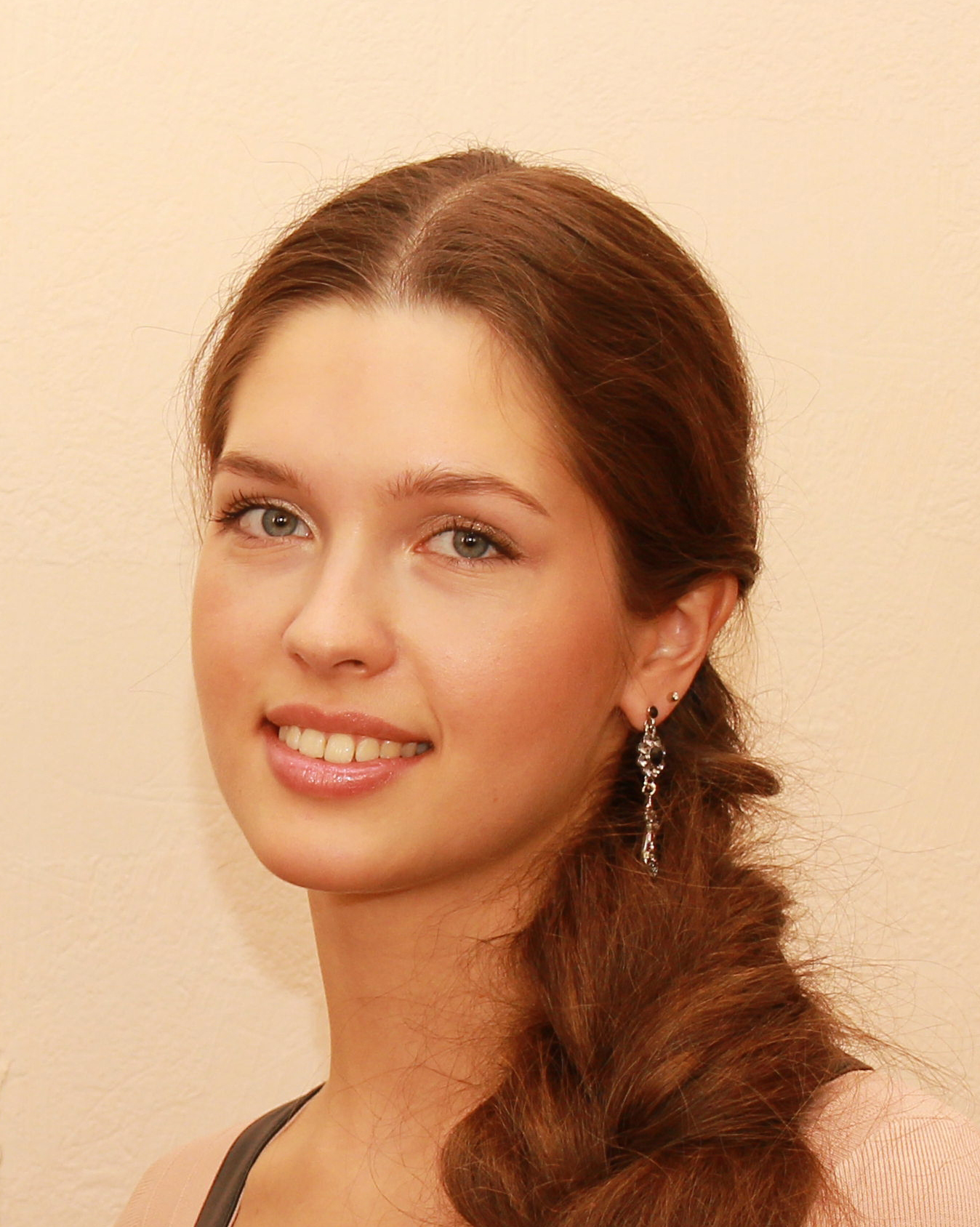
- Golovanova in March 2012
- Born: Elizaveta Golovanova; 2 April 1993 (age 33); Smolensk, Russia
- Occupation: Beauty pageant contestant
- Height: 5 ft (1.5 m)
- Beauty pageant titleholder
- Title: Miss Russia 2012
- Hair color: Brown
- Eye color: Blue
- Major competitions: Miss Russia 2012; (Winner); Miss World 2012; (Unplaced); Miss Universe 2012; (Top 10)

Elizaveta Igorevna Golovanova (Russian: Елизаве́та И́горевна Голова́нова; born 2 April 1993) is a Russian model and beauty pageant titleholder who was crowned Miss Russia 2012 and represented her country at Miss World 2012, where she did not place, and Miss Universe 2012, where she finished in the Top 10. She is the first Miss Russia to be born after the Soviet Union collapsed in 1991.

Awards and achievements
Preceded by Natalia Gantimurova	Miss Russia; 2012	Succeeded by Elmira Abdrazakova
