= Miss Russia =

Beauty pageant

Miss Russia Organization; Мисс Россия
- Formation: 1989; 37 years ago
- Type: Beauty pageant
- Headquarters: Moscow
- Location: Russia
- Members: Miss Universe; Miss BRICS
- Official language: Russian
- National director: Anastasia Belyak
- Website: www.missrussia.ru(in Russian)

Miss Russia (Russian: Мисс Россия, romanized: Miss Rossiya) is a national beauty pageant in Russia. It selects the Russian representatives to compete in two of the major beauty pageants: Miss World and Miss Universe.

== History ==
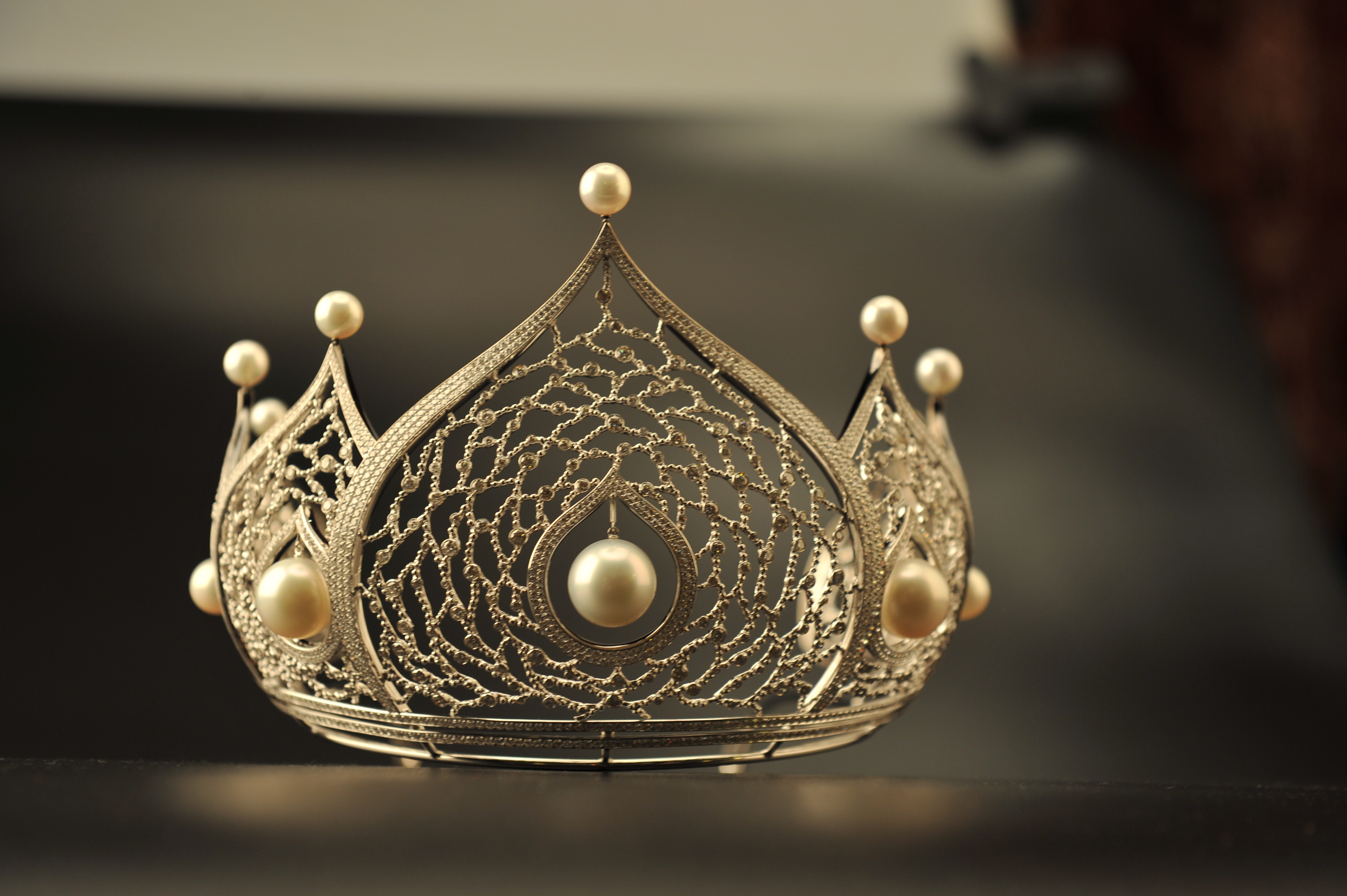
The Miss Russia crown

The pageant began in 1992; however, there was no Miss Russia 1994, or 2000 or 2008.

Since 2007, the winner of Miss Russia represents her country at Miss World and Miss Universe. If the winner is unable to participate, a runner-up is sent instead.

Russia has won three major international titles: Miss World 1992, Miss Universe 2002, although later dethroned, and Miss World 2008.

It is estimated that Miss Russia has over 80,000-100,000 applicants annually.

=== International winners ===
Russian representatives under Miss Russia Organization who won International titles.

- Miss Universe
  - 2002 — Oxana Fedorova
- Miss World
  - 2008 — Ksenia Sukhinova
  - 1992 — Julia Kourotchkina
- Miss Europe
  - 2002 — Svetlana Koroleva
  - 1999 — Yelena Rogozhina

== Titleholders ==
Year	Miss Russia	Russian name	Represented	Notes
1992	Julia Kourotchkina	Юлия Курочкина	Shcherbinka	Miss World 1992
1993	Anna Baitchik	Анна Витальевна Байчик	Saint Petersburg	
1995	Elmira Touyusheva	Эльми́ра Альбе́ртовна Тую́шева	Kaluga Oblast	
1996	Alexandra Petrova	Александра Валерьевна Петрова	Cheboksary	
1997	Yelena Rogozhina	Елена Рогожина	Samara Oblast	Miss Europe 1999
1998	Anna Malova	Анна Малова	Yaroslavl Oblast	
1999	Anna Kruglova	Анна Круглова	Tatarstan	
2001	Oxana Fedorova^{[α]}	Оксана Геннадьевна Фёдорова	Saint Petersburg	Miss Universe 2002
2002	Svetlana Koroleva	Светлана Юрьевна Королёва	Karelia	Miss Europe 2002
2003	Victoria Lopyreva	Виктория Петровна Лопырёва	Rostov Oblast	
2004	Diana Zaripova	Диана Зарипова	Tatarstan	
2005	Alexandra Ivanovskaya	Александра Ивановская	Khabarovsk Krai	
2006	Tatiana Kotova	Татьяна Николаевна Котова	Rostov Oblast	
2007	Ksenia Sukhinova	Ксе́ния Влади́мировна Сухи́нова	Tyumen Oblast	Miss World 2008
2009	Sofia Rudieva	София Андреевна Рудьева	Saint Petersburg	
2010	Irina Antonenko	Ири́на И́горевна Анто́ненко	Sverdlovsk Oblast	
2011	Natalia Gantimurova	Наталья Серге́евна Гантимурова	Moscow Oblast	
2012	Elizaveta Golovanova	Елизаве́та И́горевна Голова́нова	Smolensk Oblast	
2013	Elmira Abdrazakova	Эльмира Рафаи́ловна Абдразакова	Mezhdurechensk	
2014	Yulia Alipova	Юлия Сергеевна Алипова	Balakovo	
2015	Sofia Nikitchuk	София Викторовна Никитчук	Yekaterinburg	
2016	Yana Dobrovolskaya	Яна Денисовна Добровольская	Tyumen Oblast	
2017	Polina Popova	Полина Алексеевна Попова	Sverdlovsk Oblast	
2018	Yulia Polyachikhina	Юлия Сергеевна Полячихина	Chuvashia	
2019	Alina Sanko	Алина Станиславовна Санько	Azov	
2022	Anna Linnikova	Анна Владиславовна Линникова	Orenburg	
2023	Margarita Golubeva	Маргарита Александровна Голубева	Saint Petersburg	
2024	Valentina Alekseeva	Валентина Андреевна Алексеева	Chuvashia	Miss Brics 2026
2025	Anastasia Venza	Анастасия Венза	Moscow Oblast	

Note:
- ^α She reigned for 119 days until becoming the first Miss Universe to be dethroned (the reasons for which are not entirely clear)

=== Winners' gallery ===
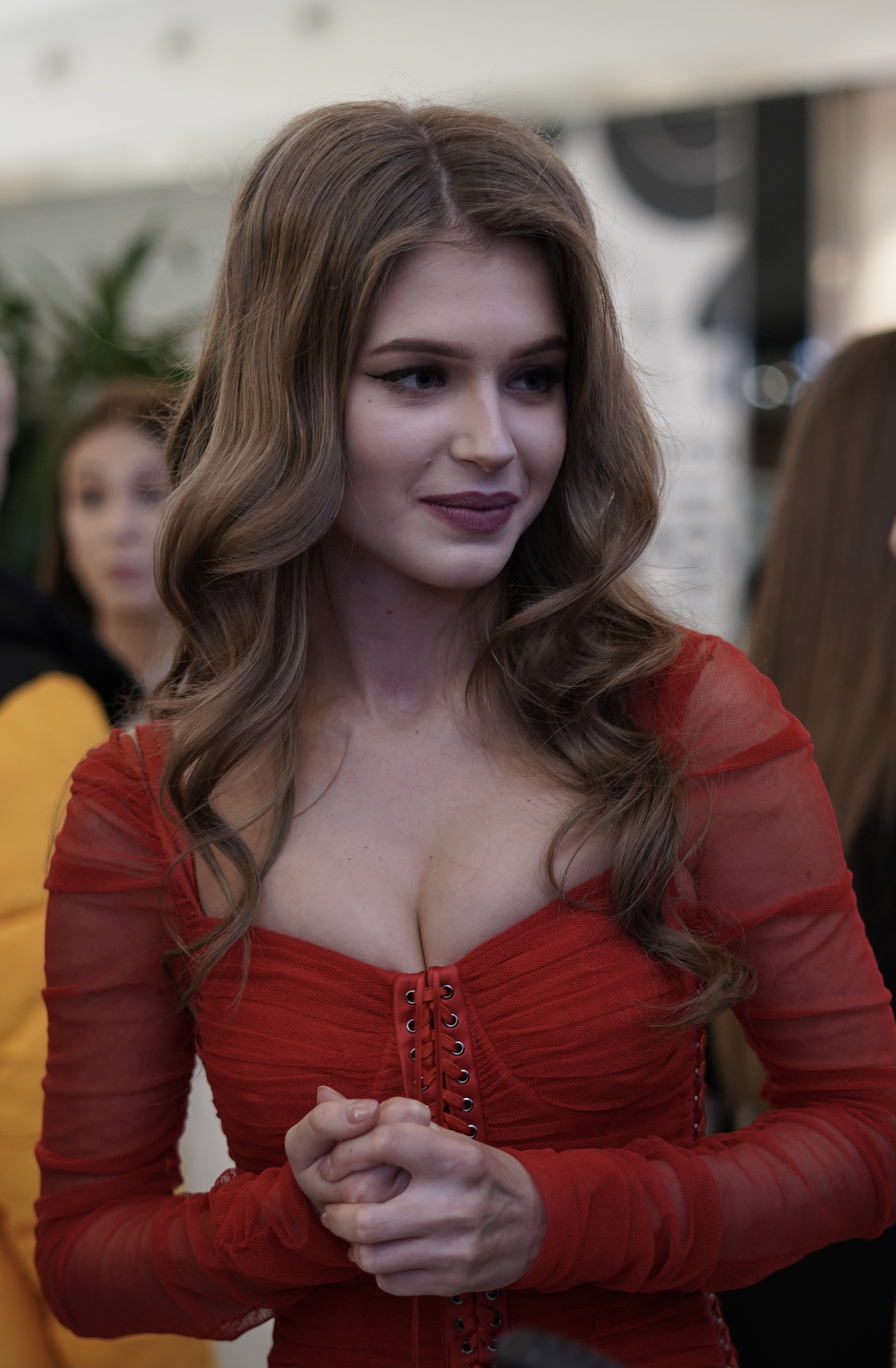
Alina Sanko, Miss Russia 2019

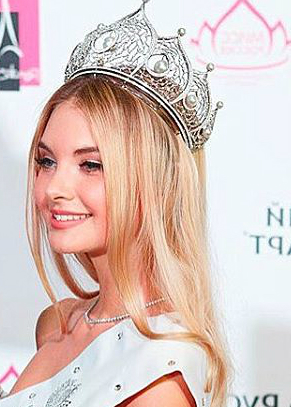
Polina Popova, Miss Russia 2017

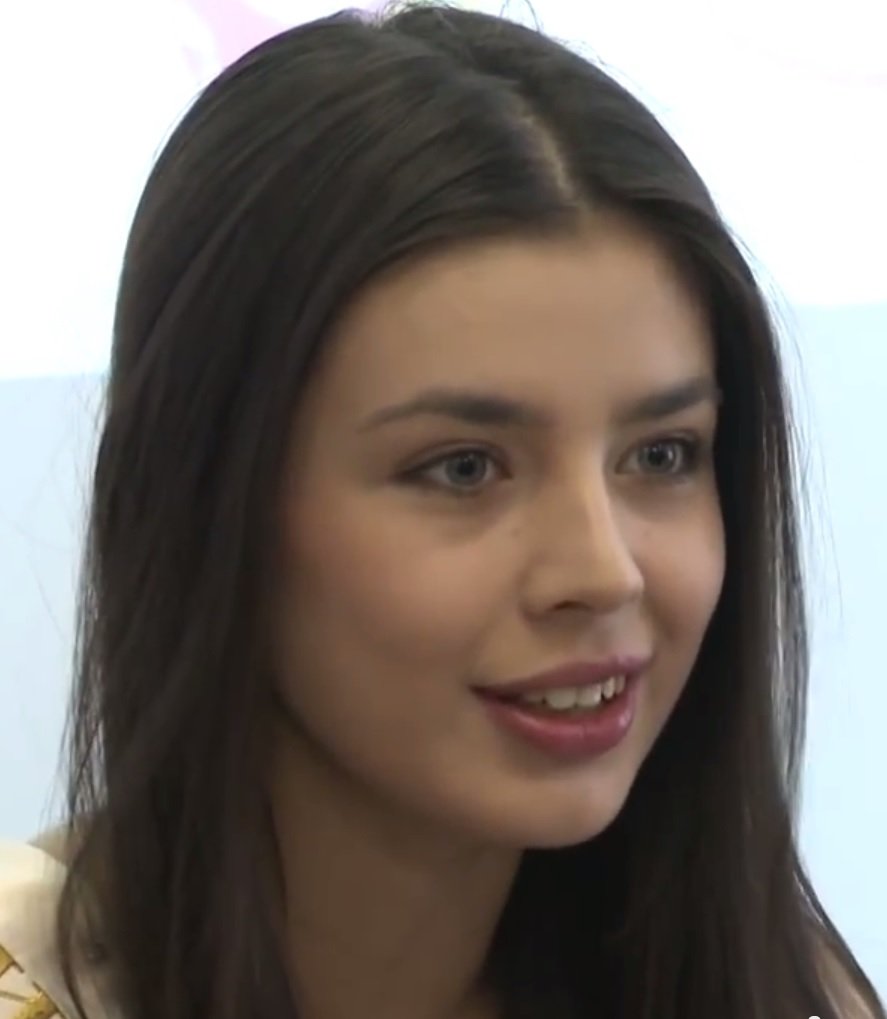
Elmira Abdrazakova, Miss Russia 2013

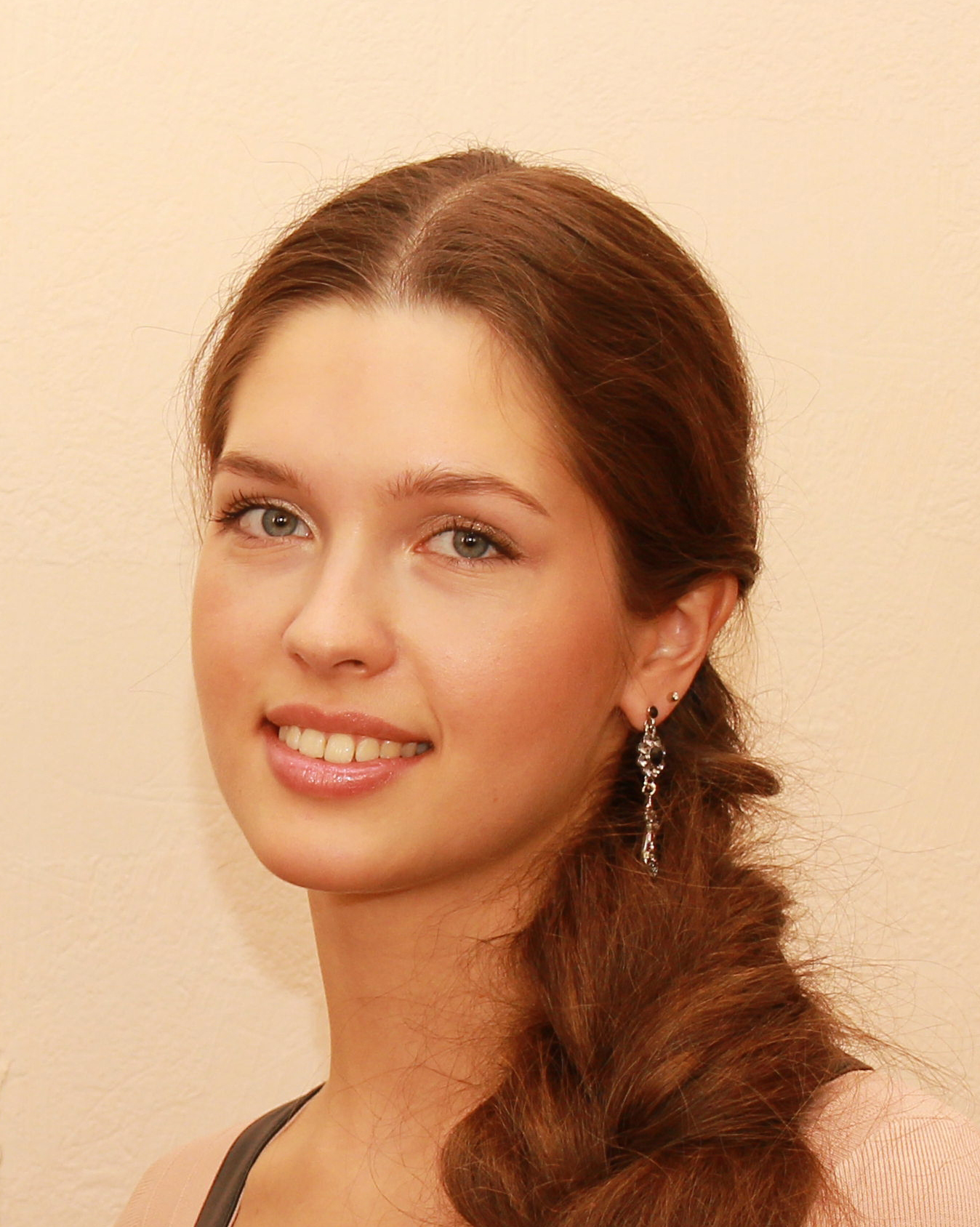
Elizaveta Golovanova, Miss Russia 2012

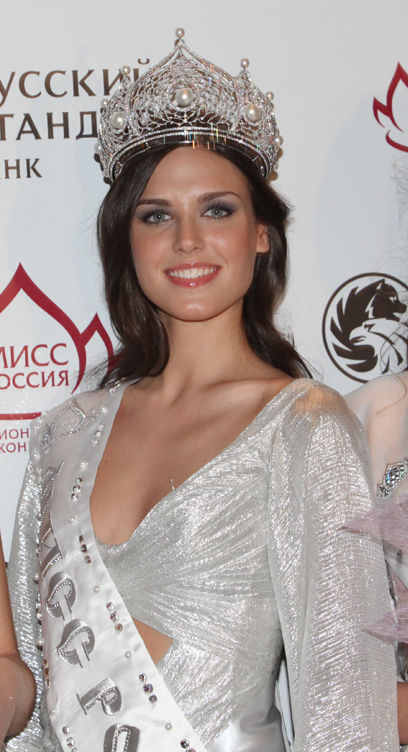
Irina Antonenko, Miss Russia 2010

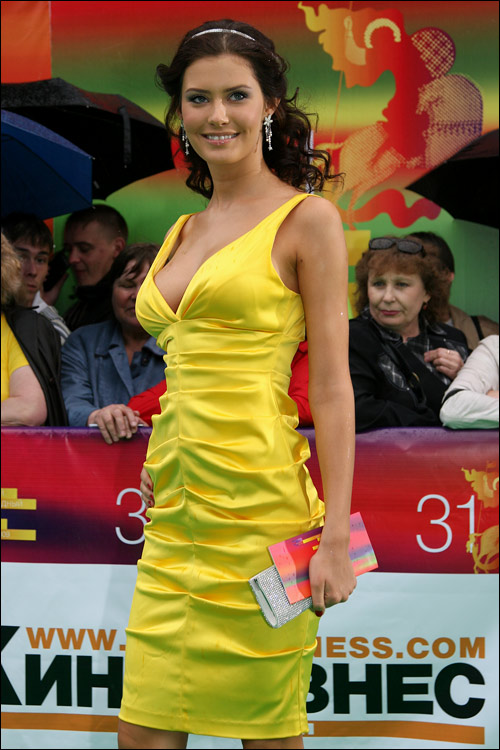
Sofia Rudieva, Miss Russia 2009

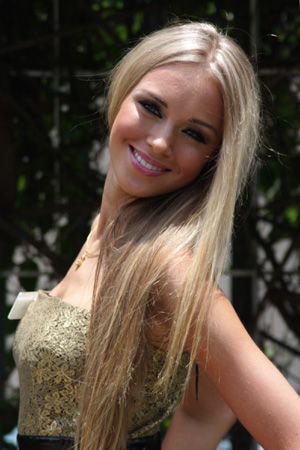
Ksenia Sukhinova, Miss Russia 2007

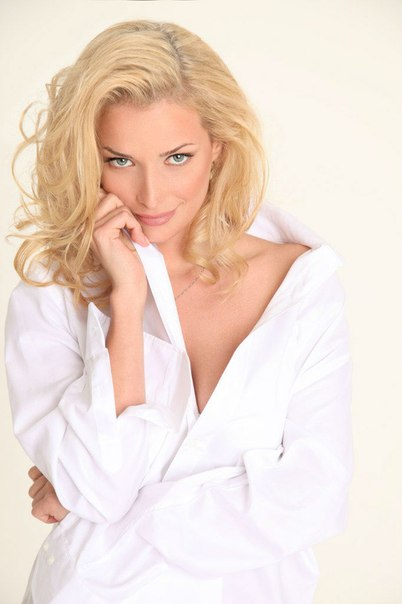
Tatiana Kotova, Miss Russia 2006

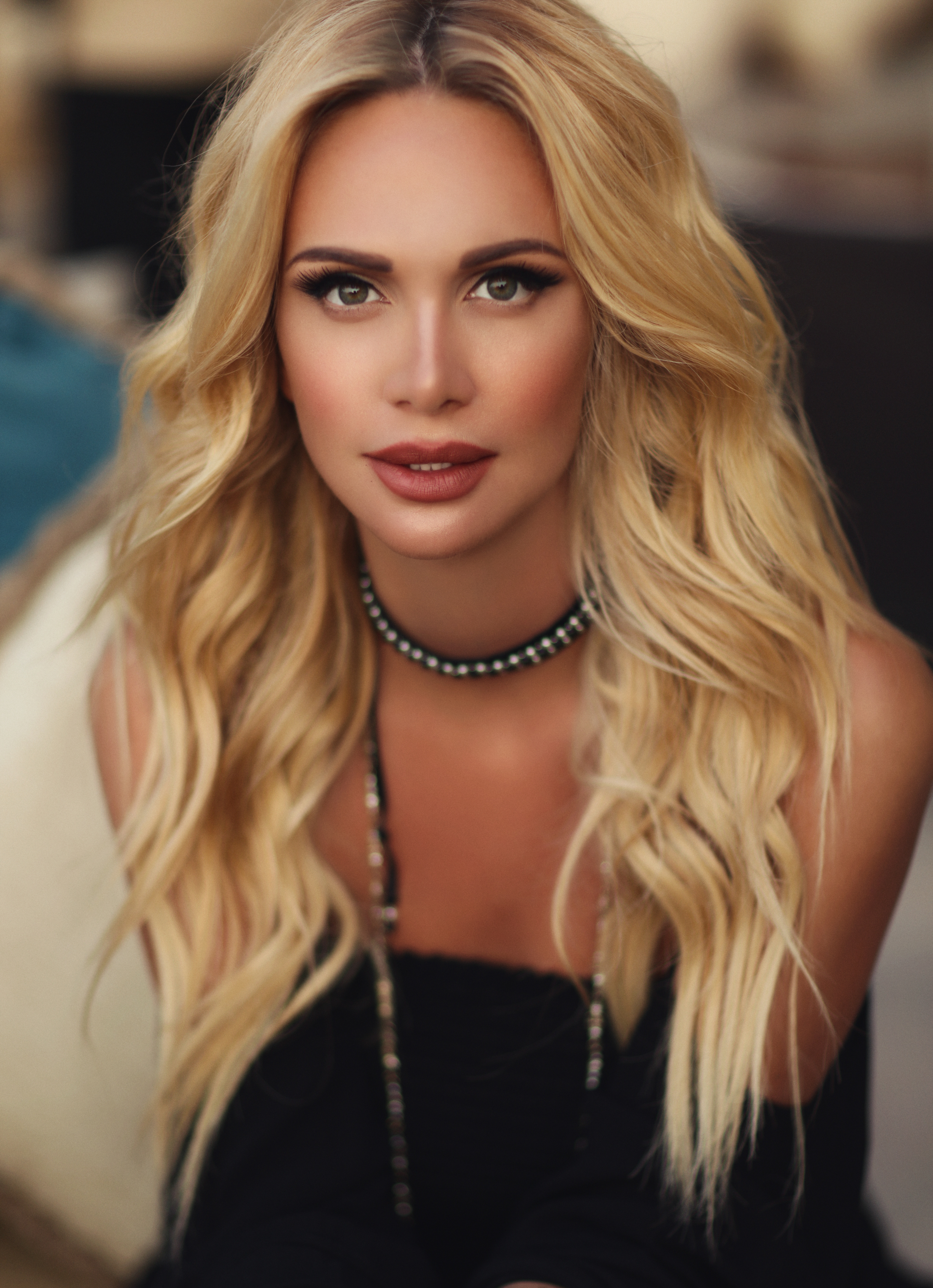
Victoria Lopyreva, Miss Russia 2003

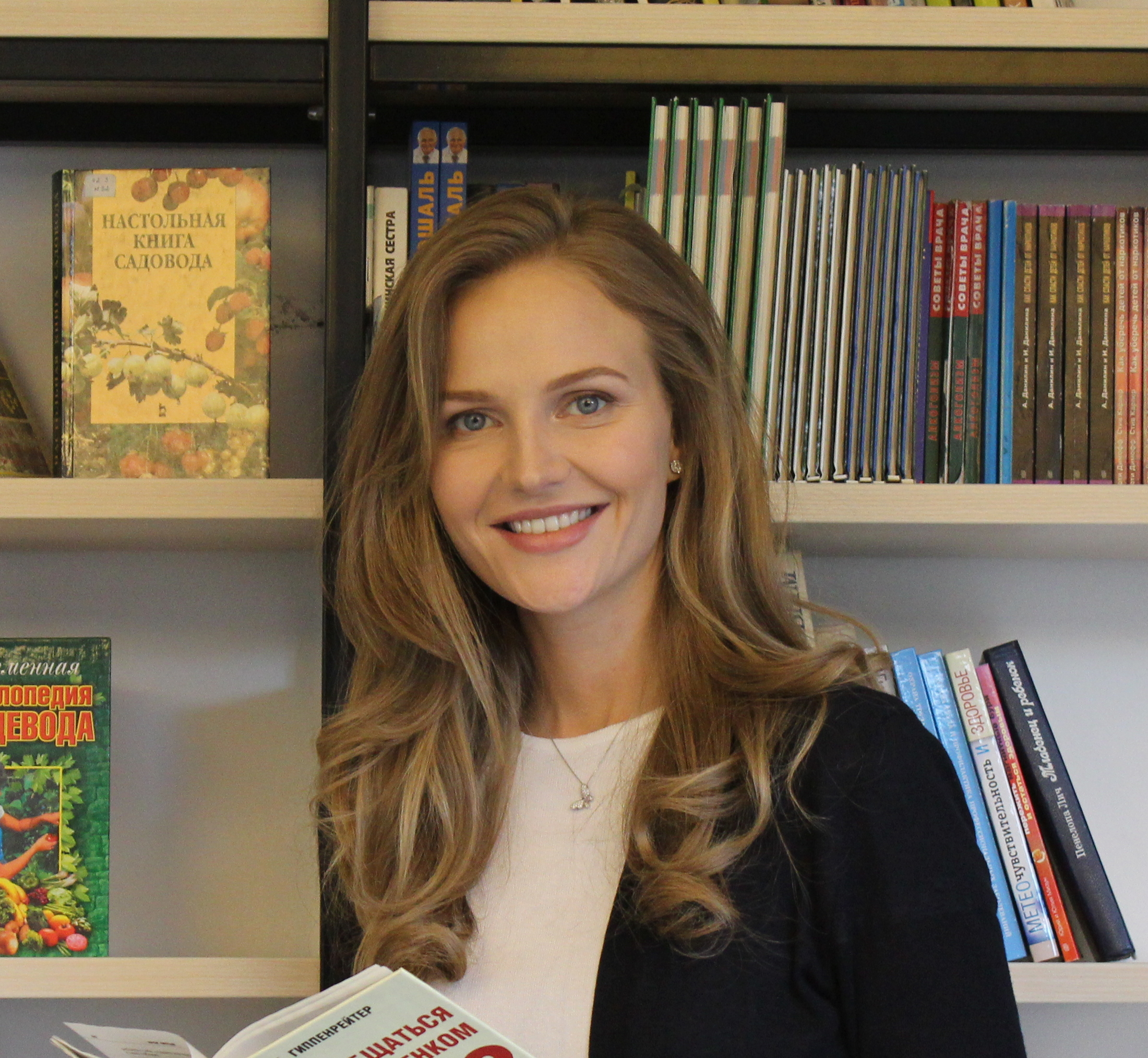
Svetlana Koroleva, Miss Russia 2002

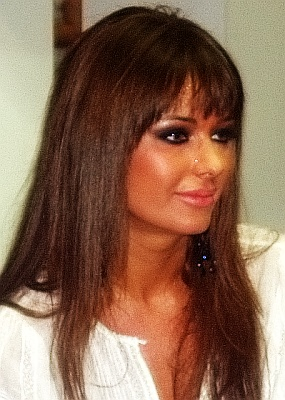
Oxana Fedorova, Miss Russia 2001

== International representatives ==
The following women have represented Russia under Miss Russia Organization in the Miss Universe and Miss World pageants. The Miss Russia Organization received the license for Miss Universe in 1994, and for Miss World in 2007. Occasionally, a runner-up or former titleholder is sent to represent Russia instead of the incumbent Miss Russia titleholder.

Color key

- : Declared as Winner
- : Ended as runner-up or top 5/6 qualification
- : Ended as one of the finalists or semifinalists
- : Ended as special awards winner

=== Miss Universe Russia ===
The main winner of Miss Russia represents Russia at Miss Universe and Miss World pageant. On occasion, when the winner does not qualify (due to age), or decides to not compete at one of the pageants, a runner-up is sent.

Year	Federal Subject	Miss Universe Russia	Placement at Miss Universe	Special awards
Miss Russia directorship — a franchise holder to Miss Universe from 1994―2003, since 2007 Miss Russia sends the winner to Miss Universe
2026	Tyumen Oblast	Alexandra Stashkevich	TBA	
2025	Moscow Oblast	Anastasia Venza	Unplaced	
2024	Chuvashia	Valentina Alekseeva	Top 12	
2023	Saint Petersburg	Margarita Golubeva	Unplaced	
2022	Orenburg Oblast	Anna Linnikova	Unplaced	
2021	Tatarstan	Ralina Arabova	Unplaced	
2020	Rostov Oblast	Alina Sanko	Unplaced	
Did not compete in 2019
2018	Chuvashia	Yulia Polyachikhina	Unplaced	
2017	Moscow	Kseniya Alexandrova	Unplaced	
2016	Orenburg Oblast	Yuliana Korolkova	Unplaced	
2015	Chita Oblast	Vladislava Evtushenko	Unplaced	
2014	Saratov Oblast	Yulia Alipova	Unplaced	
2013	Kemerovo Oblast	Elmira Abdrazakova	Unplaced	Best National Costume (2nd Place)
2012	Smolensk Oblast	Elizaveta Golovanova	Top 10	
2011	Moscow Oblast	Natalia Gantimurova	Unplaced	
2010	Sverdlovsk Oblast	Irina Antonenko	Top 15	
2009	Saint Petersburg	Sofia Rudieva	Unplaced	
2008	Moscow	Vera Krasova	3rd Runner-up	
2007	Rostov Oblast	Tatiana Kotova	Unplaced	
Miss Universe Russia ― Russian representatives were selected by an independent pageant, Miss Russia Universe between 2004―2006
2006	Kemerovo Oblast	Anna Litvinova	Top 20	Best National Costume (Top 20)
2005	Rostov Oblast	Nataliya Nikolayeva	Unplaced	
2004	Novosibirsk Oblast	Kseniya Kustova	Unplaced	
Miss Russia directorship — a franchise holder to Miss Universe between 1994―2003
2003	Khabarovsk	Olesya Bondarenko	Unplaced	
2002	Saint Petersburg	Oxana Fedorova	Miss Universe 2002	Best Swimsuit
2001	Khanty-Mansi	Oksana Kalandyrets	Top 10	
2000	Moscow	Svetlana Goreva	Unplaced	
1999	Chuvashia	Alexandra Petrova	Unplaced	
1998	Yaroslavl Oblast	Anna Malova	Top 10	
1997	Saint Petersburg	Anna Baitchik	Unplaced	
1996	Saratov Oblast	Ilmira Shamsutdinova	Top 6	Best National Costume
1995	Moscow	Yuliya Alekseyeva	Unplaced	
1994	Moscow	Inna Zobova	Unplaced	

=== Miss World Russia ===
Year	Federal Subject	Miss World Russia	Placement at Miss World	Special awards
Miss Russia directorship — a franchise holder to Miss World between 2007−2019
Did not compete between 2021—present
2019	Rostov Oblast	Alina Sanko	Top 12	Miss World Top Model (Top 40)
2018	Yakutia	Natalya Stroeva	Top 30	Beauty with a Purpose (Top 25); Miss World Top Model (Top 32)
2017	Sverdlovsk Oblast	Polina Popova	Top 10	Beauty with a Purpose (Top 20); Miss World Top Model (Top 30)
2016	Tyumen Oblast	Yana Dobrovolskaya	Unplaced	Miss World Talent (Top 21)
2015	Sverdlovsk Oblast	Sofia Nikitchuk	1st Runner-up	
2014	Rostov Oblast	Anastasiya Kostenko	Top 25	
2013	Kemerovo Oblast	Elmira Abdrazakova	Unplaced	
2012	Smolensk Oblast	Elizaveta Golovanova	Unplaced	
2011	Moscow Oblast	Natalia Gantimurova	Top 30	
2010	Tatarstan	Irina Sharipova	Top 25	
2009	Ivanovo Oblast	Kseniya Shipilova	Unplaced	
2008	Tyumen Oblast	Ksenia Sukhinova	Miss World 2008	Miss World Top Model; Continental Queen of Europe
2007	Rostov Oblast	Tatiana Kotova	Unplaced	

== See also ==
- Miss USSR
- Miss International Russia
- Krasa Rossii (Miss Earth Russia)
