= Vladimir Matetsky =

Russian composer (born 1952)

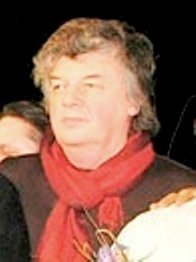

Background information
- Born: 14 May 1952 (age 74); Moscow, Russia
- Origin: Moscow, USSR
- Genres: rock, blues, Pop, electronica, folk, R&B
- Occupations: Singer-songwriter, musician, record producer, author
- Instrument: guitar
- Years active: 1968–present

Vladimir Leonardovich Matetsky (Russian: Владимир Леонардович Матецкий; born 14 May 1952 in Moscow) is a Russian composer, producer, and radio presenter.

== Personal Life and Career ==
Matetsky is a member of the Russian Authors' Society.

He is married and has one daughter, Maria (born 1987) and son, Leonid (born 2001).

Matetsky started to take music classes under the direction of Sofija Moisseevna Karpilovskaya, a student of Elena Fabianovna Gnesina. Vladimir learned to play guitar just as piano. He was particularly influenced by The Beatles. At the end of the 1960s, Matetsky started to play in various rock bands, piano, guitar, bass-guitar. Around the same time he first started writing songs–unusually, in English rather than Russian.

His major success is considered to be his song Lavanda, which was written for Sofia Rotaru. It was awarded a golden disc by Melodiya.

Currently he lives and works in Moscow.

== Popular Songs ==
- "Lavanda" ("Лаванда") by Sofia Rotaru and Jaak Joala
- "Hutoryanka" ("Хуторянка") by Sofia Rotaru
- "Luna, luna" ("Луна, луна") by Sofia Rotaru
- "Bilo, No proshlo'" ("Было, но прошло") by Sofia Rotaru
- "Tolko etogo malo'" ("Только этого мало") by Sofia Rotaru
- "Lunnaya raduga'" ("Лунная радуга") by Sofia Rotaru
- "Dikie Lebedi'" ("Дикие лебеди") by Sofia Rotaru
- "Byla ne byla'" ("Была не была") by Sofia Rotaru
- "Tvoi pecialinie glaza'" ("Твои печальные глаза") by Sofia Rotaru
- "Nochnoi motilek'" ("Ночной мотылёк") by Sofia Rotaru
- "Zasentebrilo'" ("Засентябрило") by Sofia Rotaru
- "Net mne mesta v tvyom serdce'" ("Нет мне места в твоём сердце") by Sofia Rotaru
- "Bolsche ne vstrechu" ("Больше не встречу") by Alexander Barykin
- "Avtomobili" (" Автомобили") by Vesiolie Rebiata
- "Pozovi menya v nochi" ("Позови меня в ночи") by Vlad Stashevsky
- "Malish" ("Малыш") by Danko
- "Zheltaya noch" ("Жёлтая ночь") by Vadim Kazachenko
