= Anu Namshir =

Mongolian model and beauty queen

Namshiryn Anu Намширын Ану
- Born: April 12, 1991 (age 34); Ulaanbaatar, Mongolia
- Education: Mongolian University of Science and Technology {B.Sc}
- Occupation: model
- Years active: 2010–present
- Agent(s): Mongolian Model Agency (from 2010 to present), Colorset LLC, Mongolian National Designer's Association
- Height: 1.78 m (5 ft 10 in)
- Title: World Bikini Model International 2014 (1st Runner up); Miss Manzhouli 2014 (Winner); Asian Star Model 2015 (Winner); Supermodel International 2015 (1st Runner up); Miss World Mongolia 2015 (Winner); Miss Tourism Queen International 2016 (Winner); Asian Queen 2016
- Website: Facebook

Anu Namshir (Mongolian: Намширын Ану, Chinese: 阿努·纳姆希尔, Korean: 아누 남시르, born April 12, 1991), is a Mongolian model and beauty pageant titleholder. She was first runner up at World Bikini Model International 2014, and Miss Manzhouli 2014 (winner) in China, and Asian Star Model 2015. She also participated in Supermodel International 2015 (winner) in Korea, and Miss World Mongolia 2015 (national winner). She represented Mongolia in the Miss World 2015.On September 26, 2016, she was crowned Miss Tourism Queen International 2016 and awarded Miss Charity. December 1, 2016, she participated first in Goyol 2017, which was organized by Mongolian Designers Association annually was awarded "Photo Model". She worked at Mongolia's Next Top Model show 14th number representing Z24 online ticket reservation through Z24 face.

== Modeling career ==
=== Miss World Mongolia 2015 ===
Anu competed in the Miss World Mongolia 2015 pageant and was the winner of the national pageant. She was the delegate for Mongolia in the Miss World 2015 competition via a TV reality show that concluded on July 5 at the State Academic Theater of Opera and Ballet, Ulaanbaatar. This beauty pageant competition was aired on MNC television. She represented Mongolia in the Miss World 2015 pageant held in Sanya, Hainan Island, China PR. In October, 2016 she passed her crown on to next national winner, A. Bayartsetseg, during the winner's ceremony. Anu has the talent to paint portraits by her lips. She first painted for 'Miss talent' in the Miss Mongolia 2013, and then for 'Miss talent' in the Miss World 2015. She put on an art exhibition which was named 'Charity Kiss Art Event' on September 18, 2015, at the Q Art Gallerie in Ulaanbaatar for 'Beauty With A Purpose' in Miss World 2015. During 'Charity Kiss Art Event,' she screened famous people's portraits such as Genghis Khan, Michael Jackson, and Marilyn Monroe.

=== Miss World 2015 ===
She represented Mongolia in the Miss World 2015, the 65th edition of the Miss World pageant, was held on 19 December 2015 at the Crown of Beauty Theatre, Sanya, China. 114 contestants from all over the world competed for the crown. During the pageant, her dress became one of the top 10 designer dresses which was made by Tserenlkhagva, a designer at Precious Fashion House. She was also invited to put on her exhibition of her portraits that she painted by her lips in London. She became one of the best 25 beauty of purpose miss.

=== Miss Tourism Queen International 2016 ===
She participated representing Mongolia in the Miss Tourism Queen International 2016. The beauty pageant continued from 12 September to 26 September 2016. At the conclusion of the finale of Miss Tourism Queen International 2016 held on 26 September 2016 at Wenzhou, China, Namshir was crowned as the winner. She succeeds Kantapat Peeradachainarin from Thailand as the new Miss Tourism Queen International 2016, and battled out 27 other contestants to clinch the coveted title. And she also awarded Miss Charity. In addition to winning the title, Anu also received US$10,000 in cash as prize. In this pageant Miss Oyungerel Gankhuyag participated first in 2007 representing Mongolia. Anu wrote on her Facebook page, “My dream came true. I want to express my gratitude to my family, my love, founder of Mongol Model Agency D.Bolormaa, and all Mongolians for always being on my side. I am also very thankful for Precious Fashion House for making all of my dresses. I always wanted to promote Mongolia in the world by being crowned in international competitions. I tried hard to reach my dream. I harvested what I planted. If you have a dream, work on it. If it’s in your heart, then never give up.” In October 2016, she traveled around Taiwan such as Pacific Ocean through Miss Tourism Queen International 2016 winner and she participated as guest Golden Horse Film Festival and Awards 2016 in Taipei, Taiwan. From Jan 1, 2017 She flew to Vietnam through Miss Tourism Queen International 2016 winner. During visiting there she was invited to attend at the Press Conference in Ho Chi Minh City for Miss Tourism Queen Vietnam 2017 contest. March 7, 2017, she flew to Vietnam to judge Miss Tourism Vietnam 2017 final contest.

== Appearance ==
=== Music videos ===
Year	Song title	Artist
2012	We (Бид)	Nomin Talst
2013	Four seasons (Дөрвөн улирал)	Bold Dorjsuren
2014	How to draw light video lesson	with Lkhagva-Ochir (contortionist)
2015	Ocean of Feeling (Сэтгэлийн тэнгис)	Serchmaa

=== Stage show ===
Year	Title	Role	Network
2015	Time passed (Цаг өөр болжээ)	actress	Dream Theatre (Мөрөөдлийн театр)

=== TV program ===
Year	Title	Role	Network
2014	Miss Mongolia 2014	Judge	MNB
2014	NB & Sally	Guest	YouTube
2014	Open House	Guest	ETV
2015	Metropolitan rhythm (Нийслэл хэмнэл)	Guest	C1
2015	Today's beginning (Өнөөдрийн эхлэл)	Guest	C1
2015	New Year's program (Шинэ жилийн хөтөлбөр)	Guest	NTV
2015	New Year's program (Шинэ жилийн хөтөлбөр)	Guest	MNC
2015	Miss World Mongolia 2015	Contestant	MNC
2015	Miss World 2015	Contestant	MNC
2016	Giliin hatan (Гилийн хатан)	Guest	UBS
2016	City Night (City Night шөнийн хөтөлбөр)	Guest	UBS
2016	Freestyle Women (Чөлөөт эмэгтэйчүүд)	Host	NTV
2016	Metropolitan rhythm (Нийслэл хэмнэл)	Guest	C1
2016	City Night (City Night шөнийн хөтөлбөр)	Guest	UBS
2016	Freestyle Women (Чөлөөт эмэгтэйчүүд)	Guest	NTV
2016	Ladies comportment (Бүсгүй ааль)	Guest	SBN
2017	Gyalbaa	Guest	SBN
2017	Changa shivnee	Guest	Star TV Mongolia

== Awards ==
Year	Award	Category	Nominated work	Result
2010	Mongolian University of Science and Technology	The Best Model	The Best Model	Won
2011	Face of Mongolia	The Best Model	—N/a	Won
2013	Mongolian Youth Federation	'The best youth' golden medal	—N/a	Won
2014	World Bikini Model International 2014	first runner up	—N/a	Won
2014	World Bikini Model International 2014	The Taste Award	—N/a	Won
2014	Miss Manzhouli 2014	winner	—N/a	Won
2015	Asian Star Model 2015	winner	—N/a	Won
2015	Supermodel International	first runner up	—N/a	Won
2015	Supermodel International	Best Catwalk Diwa	—N/a	Won
2015	Supermodel International	The Taste Award	—N/a	Won
2015	Supermodel International	Miss Photogenic	—N/a	Won
2015	Miss World Mongolia 2015	winner	—N/a	Won
2015	Miss World Mongolia 2015	Miss Beach Beauty	Miss Beach Beauty	Won
2016	Miss Mongolian Nations	Miss Bikini	—N/a	Won
2016	Miss Mongolian Nations	The Taste Award	—N/a	Won
2016	Miss Tourism Queen International 2016	winner	—N/a	Won
2016	Miss Tourism Queen International 2016	Miss Charity	—N/a	Won
2016	Miss Tourism Queen International 2016	Queen	—N/a	Won
2017	Goyol 2017	Photo Model	—N/a	Won
2023	Goyol 2023	Best Model	—N/a	Won

Awards and achievements
Preceded by (Russia) Butykova Tamara	Miss Manzhouli; 2014	Succeeded by (China) Huang Xiaoling

Awards and achievements
Preceded by Battsetseg Turbat	Miss World Mongolia; 2015	Succeeded by Bayartsetseg Altangerel

Awards and achievements
Preceded by (Philippines) Nancy Leonard	Miss Tourism Queen International 2016; Winner; 2016	Succeeded by TBA
