= Miss World 2017 =

Beauty pageant edition

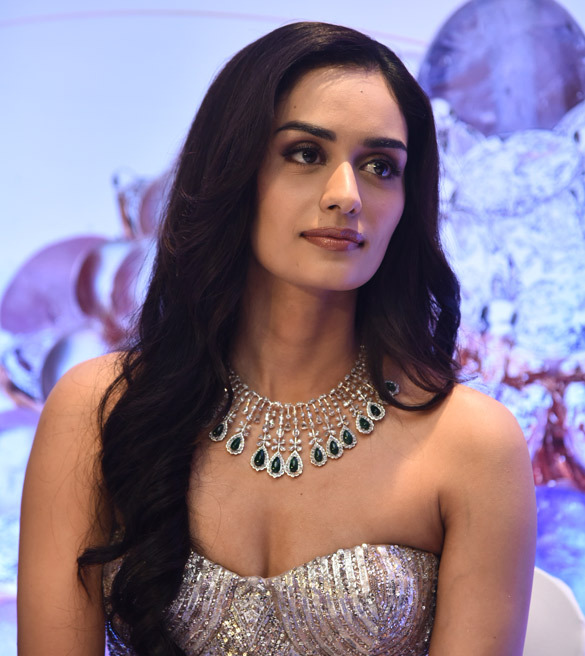
- Manushi Chhillar
- Date: 18 November 2017
- Presenters: Fernando Allende; Angela Chow; Megan Young; Frankie Cena; Barney Walsh; Steve Douglas
- Entertainment: Kristian Kostov; Jeffrey Li; Celine Tam; Zizi
- Venue: Sanya City Arena, Sanya, China
- Broadcaster: Estrella TV; DirecTV
- Entrants: 118
- Placements: 40
- Debuts: Armenia; Laos; Senegal
- Withdrawals: Antigua and Barbuda; Belarus; Costa Rica; Czech Republic; Democratic Republic of the Congo; Guinea-Bissau; Haiti; Kyrgyzstan; Latvia; Malaysia; Puerto Rico; Saint Lucia; Sierra Leone; Uganda; United States Virgin Islands
- Returns: Angola; Bangladesh; Cameroon; Cape Verde; Ethiopia; Greece; Hong Kong; Liberia; Macau; Madagascar; Norway; Zambia; Zimbabwe
- Winner: Manushi Chhillar; India

Miss World 2017 was the 67th edition of the Miss World pageant, held at the Sanya City Arena in Sanya, China, on 18 November 2017.

Stephanie Del Valle of Puerto Rico crowned Manushi Chhillar of India as her successor at the end of the event. It was the sixth victory for India in the history of the pageant, tying with Venezuela for the most wins in the pageant's history. The 1st Runner-Up was Andrea Meza of Mexico, and the 2nd Runner-Up was Stephanie Hill of England.

== Background ==
=== Selection of participants ===
==== Replacements ====
Michèle Ange Minkata of Cameroon was appointed to compete in the Miss World 2017 after Julie Nguimfack, Miss Cameroon 2016, was dethroned due to indiscipline. Nguimfack was denied a U.S. visa to participate in the previous year's event and was expected to compete this year’s but Minkata, who was the fourth runner-up in Miss Cameroon 2016, stepped in as the new representative, Maria Psilou was crowned Star Hellas 2017 at a private casting organized by Vassilis Prevelakis, the national director of the Star Hellas pageant. She replaced Theodora Soukia, Miss Hellas 2017, as Greece's representative at Miss World 2017. The reasons for this change were not publicly disclosed, Felana Tirindraza of Madagascar was appointed to represent her country at the Miss World 2017 pageant after Njara Windye Harris, the original winner, chose to compete in the Miss University Africa 2017 contest instead, and Itır Esen, who was crowned Miss Turkey World 2017, was dethroned just hours later due to a controversial tweet about the 2016 Turkish coup attempt. Aslı Sümen, the first runner-up, was subsequently appointed as Miss Turkey Universe 2017.

Jannatul Nayeem Avril of Bangladesh, was dethroned and she was replaced by her 2nd Runner-up, Jessia Islam. Khephra Sylvester of the British Virgin Islands withdrew from the competition due to the conflicting dates between Miss Universe 2017 and Miss World 2017, she was replaced by her 1st Runner-up, Helina Hewlett. Alicia Aylies of France withdrew due to conflicting dates between Miss World 2017 and Miss Universe 2017, she was replaced by her 1st Runner-Up, Aurore Kichenin. Derri Dacres-Lee of Cayman Islands was replaced by Anika Conolly due to the minimum age requirement, Later Anika Conolly withdrew from the competition for similar allegation, She was replaced by her 1st Runner-up, Kristin Amaya. Virginia Argueta of Guatemala replaced Lisbeth Gómez for reasons unspecified. On the other hand, Vian Ameer Sulaiman of Iraq were dethroned as the Miss World for their respective countries for hiding their marriage information in the entry form, her 1st Runner-up Hama Adil, was crowned the new Miss Iraq 2017 after organisers disqualified Vian Sulaiman for hiding her marital status. But Hama Adil withdrew from the competition for unknown reason.

==== Debuts, returns, and, withdrawals ====
This edition marked the debut of Armenia, Laos and Senegal, and the return of Angola, Bangladesh, Cameroon, Cape Verde, Ethiopia, Greece, Hong Kong, Liberia, Macau, Madagascar, Norway, Zambia and Zimbabwe; Bangladesh and Madagascar in 2001, Cape Verde in 2010, Liberia in 2011, Macau in 2012, Angola in 2013, Greece and Hong Kong in 2014 and Cameroon, Ethiopia, Norway, Zambia and Zimbabwe in 2015.

Antigua and Barbuda, Belarus, Costa Rica, Czech Republic, the Democratic Republic of the Congo, Guinea-Bissau, Haiti, Kyrgyzstan, Latvia, Malaysia, Puerto Rico, Saint Lucia, Sierra Leone, Uganda and the United States Virgin Islands, withdrew from the competition.

== Results ==
=== Placements ===
Placement	Contestant
Miss World 2017	India – Manushi Chhillar
1st Runner-Up	Mexico – Andrea Meza
2nd Runner-Up	England – Stephanie Hill
Top 5	France – Aurore Kichenin; Kenya – Magline Jeruto
Top 10	Indonesia – Achintya Holte Nilsen; Jamaica – Solange Sinclair; Russia – Polina Popova; South Africa – Adè van Heerden; South Korea – Ha-eun Kim
Top 15	El Salvador – Fatima Cuellar; Japan – Haruka Yamashita; Macau – Lan Wan-Ling; Mongolia – Enkhjin Tseveendash ★; Nigeria – Ugochi Ihezue
Top 40	Argentina – Avril Marco; Bangladesh – Jessia Islam; Botswana – Nicole Gaelebale; Brazil – Gabrielle Vilela; China – Guan Siyu; Colombia – Maria Daza; Croatia – Tea Mlinarić; Dominican Republic – Aletxa Mueses; Guatemala – Virginia Argueta; Italy – Conny Notarstefano; Kazakhstan – Gul'banu Azimkhanova; Lebanon – Perla Helou; Liberia – Wokie Dolo; Malta – Michela Galea; Moldova – Ana Badaneu; Nepal – Nikita Chandak; New Zealand – Annie Evans; Peru – Pamela Sánchez; Philippines – Laura Lehmann; Poland – Magdalena Bieńkowska; Sweden – Hanna Louise Haag; Ukraine – Polina Tkach; United States – Clarissa Bowers; Venezuela – Ana Carolina Ugarte; Vietnam – Đỗ Mỹ Linh

'★' People's Choice winner

==== Continental Queens of Beauty ====
Continental Group	Contestant
Africa	Kenya – Magline Jeruto
Americas	Mexico – Andrea Meza
Asia	South Korea – Ha-eun Kim
Caribbean	Jamaica – Solange Sinclair
Europe	England – Stephanie Hill
Oceania	New Zealand – Annie Evans

== Background ==
Miss World emphasis on a new format, giving greater attraction on social media and interactivity. This new format for Miss World 2017, called the Head-to-Head Challenge, would select 20 out of the Top 40 contestants.

== Challenge Events ==
=== Head-to-Head Challenge ===
- Advanced to Top 40
- Advanced to Top 40 via a challenge event other than Head-to-Head Challenge
- Advanced to Top 40 via judges' choice
- Advanced to Top 40 via Head-to-Head Challenge, but also a challenge event winner.

Group	Country 1	Country 2	Country 3	Country 4	Country 5	Country 6
1	Angola	Austria	(The Bahamas) Bahamas	(Georgia (country)) Georgia	Guadeloupe	Italy
2	Albania	Argentina	Bolivia	(Ivory Coast) Cote d'Ivoire	Israel	Mauritius
3	Belgium	Cameroon	Chile	Guinea	Madagascar	Nepal
4	Armenia	Australia	Egypt	France	Germany	Jamaica
5	Colombia	Cook Islands	Curaçao	Gibraltar	Paraguay	Portugal
6	Bangladesh	Botswana	Brazil	Canada	Ethiopia	South Africa
7	Bosnia and Herzegovina	Dominican Republic	Guam	Honduras	Iceland	Macau
8	Cyprus	Kenya	(Republic of Ireland) Ireland	Mongolia	Russia	Singapore
9	Bulgaria	Ecuador	El Salvador	Finland	Greece	India
10	Aruba	Ghana	Hungary	Indonesia	Laos	Netherlands
11	China	Denmark	Equatorial Guinea	Hong Kong	Moldova	Ukraine
12	Croatia	England	Fiji	Guatemala	Romania	Senegal
13	Liberia	Malta	New Zealand	Nigeria	Slovakia	Tunisia
14	Montenegro	Poland	Rwanda	Seychelles	Sweden	Venezuela
15	Guyana	Japan	Peru	Slovenia	Tanzania	Uruguay
16	Mexico	Nicaragua	Northern Ireland	Norway	Scotland	Sri Lanka
17	Lesotho	Myanmar	Philippines	Serbia	Thailand	Turkey
18	Belize	South Sudan	Spain	Vietnam	Wales	Zimbabwe
19	South Korea	Lebanon	Panama	Trinidad and Tobago	United States	—N/a
20	British Virgin Islands	Cape Verde	Cayman Islands	Kazakhstan	Zambia	—N/a

=== Beauty With A Purpose ===
Placement	Contestant
Winners	India – Manushi Chhillar; Indonesia – Achintya Holte Nilsen; Philippines – Laura Lehmann; South Africa – Adè van Heerden; Vietnam – Đỗ Mỹ Linh
Top 20	Australia – Esma Voloder; Brazil – Gabrielle Vilela; British Virgin Islands – Helina Hewlett; Cook Islands – Alanna Smith; England – Stephanie Hill; Fiji – Nanise Rainima; France – Aurore Kichenin; Mongolia – Enkhjin Tseveendash; Nepal – Nikita Chandak; New Zealand – Annie Evans; Russia – Polina Popova; Slovakia – Hanka Závodná; Tanzania – Julitha Kabete; Thailand – Phatlada Kullaphakthanaphat; Zimbabwe – Chiedza Mhosva

== Contestants ==
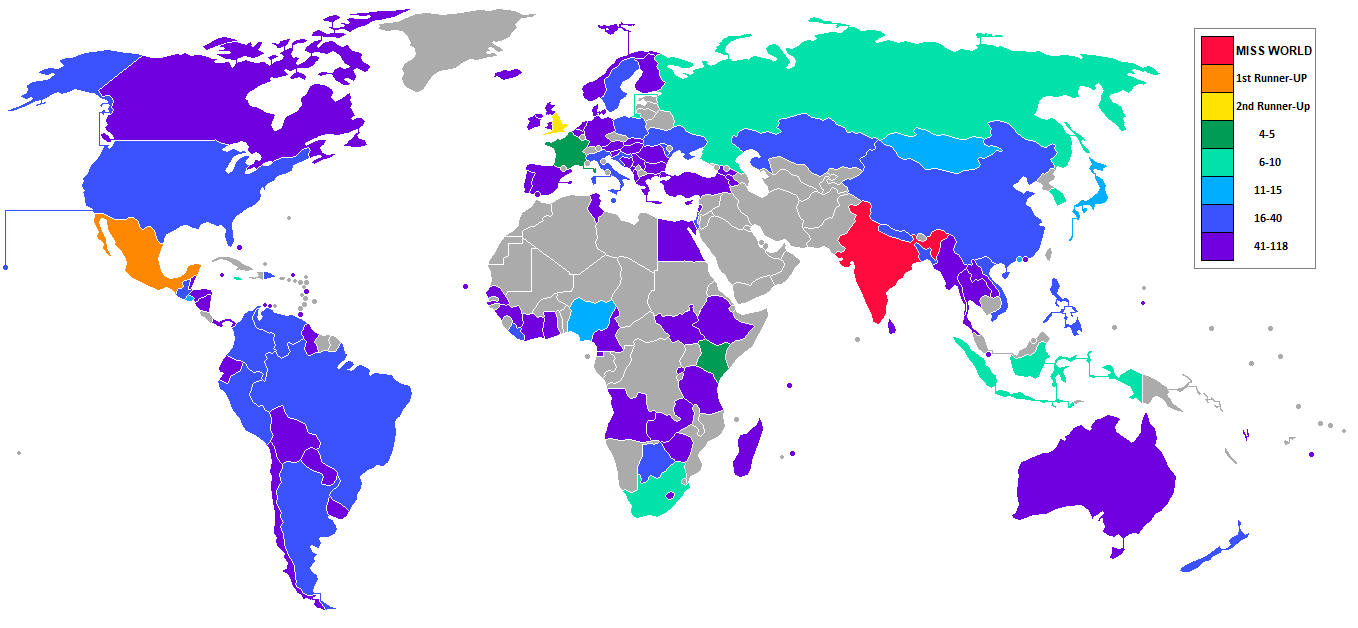
Countries and territories which sent delegates and results for Miss World 2017

118 delegates competed in Miss World 2017:

Country/Territory	Contestant	Age (Note: Ages at the time in the pageant)	Hometown	Continent
Albania	Joana Grabolli	20	Berat	Europe
Angola	Judelsia Bache	22	Luanda	Africa
Argentina	Avril Marco	20	Santiago del Estero	America
Armenia	Lili Sargsyan	18	Yerevan	Europe
Aruba	Anouk Eman	25	Oranjestad	America
Australia	Esma Voloder	25	Melbourne	Asia & Oceania
Austria	Sarah Chvala	22	Vienna	Europe
(The Bahamas) Bahamas	Geena Thompson	24	Nassau	America
Bangladesh	Jessia Islam	20	Dhaka	Asia & Oceania
Belgium	Romanie Schotte	20	Bruges	Europe
Belize	Renae Martinez	20	Belmopan	America
Bolivia	Jasmin Pinto	20	Buena Vista	America
Bosnia and Herzegovina	Aida Karamehmedović	24	Trebinje	Europe
Botswana	Nicole Gaelebale	24	Mahalapye	Africa
Brazil	Gabrielle Vilela	25	Angra dos Reis	America
British Virgin Islands	Helina Hewlett	25	Tortola	America
Bulgaria	Veronika Stefanova	25	Sofia	Europe
Cameroon	Akomo Minkata	23	Yaoundé	Africa
Canada	Cynthia Menard	17	Ottawa	America
Cape Verde	Cristilene Pimienta	21	São Vicente	Africa
Cayman Islands	Kristin Amaya	25	George Town	America
Chile	Victoria Stein	22	Puerto Montt	America
China	Guan Siyu	23	Harbin	Asia & Oceania
Colombia	Maria Daza	21	Riohacha	America
Cook Islands	Alanna Smith	25	Avarua	Asia & Oceania
(Ivory Coast) Côte d'Ivoire	Mandjalia Gbané	21	Bondoukou	Africa
Croatia	Tea Mlinarić	18	Senj	Europe
Curaçao	Vanity Girigori	21	Willemstad	America
Cyprus	Helena Tselepi	22	Limassol	Europe
Denmark	Amanda Petri	20	Copenhagen	Europe
Dominican Republic	Aletxa Mueses	22	San José de las Matas	America
Ecuador	Romina Zeballos	25	Guayaquil	America
Egypt	Farah Shaaban	19	Cairo	Africa
El Salvador	Fatima Cuellar	20	San Salvador	America
England	Stephanie Hill	22	London	Europe
Equatorial Guinea	Catalina Mangue Ondo	18	Mongomo	Africa
Ethiopia	Kisanet Molla	22	Addis Ababa	Africa
Fiji	Nanise Rainima	25	Suva	Asia & Oceania
Finland	Adriana Gerxhalija	22	Turku	Europe
France	Aurore Kichenin	22	Jacou	Europe
(Georgia (country)) Georgia	Keti Shekelashvili	23	Kareli	Asia & Oceania
Germany	Dalila Jabri	20	Hamm	Europe
Ghana	Afua Asieduwaa Akrofi	20	Accra	Africa
Gibraltar	Jodie Garcia	22	Gibraltar	Europe
Greece	Maria Psilou	20	Aigio	Europe
Guadeloupe	Audrey Berville	20	Basse-Terre	America
Guam	Destiny Cruz	20	Hagåtña	Asia & Oceania
Guatemala	Virginia Argueta	23	Jutiapa	America
Guinea	Asmaou Diallo	24	Conakry	Africa
Guyana	Vena Mookram	19	Georgetown	America
Honduras	Celia Monterrosa	22	Santa Bárbara	America
Hong Kong	Emily Wong	23	Hong Kong	Asia & Oceania
Hungary	Virág Koroknyai	20	Budapest	Europe
Iceland	Ólafía Ósk Finnsdóttir	19	Reykjavík	Europe
India	Manushi Chhillar	20	Haryana	Asia & Oceania
Indonesia	Achintya Holte Nilsen	18	Lombok	Asia & Oceania
(Republic of Ireland) Ireland	Lauren McDonagh	18	Donegal	Europe
Israel	Rotem Rabi	21	Tel Aviv	Asia & Oceania
Italy	Conny Notarstefano	21	Lucera	Europe
Jamaica	Solange Sinclair	24	Kingston	America
Japan	Haruka Yamashita	22	Tokyo	Asia & Oceania
Kazakhstan	Gul'banu Azimkhan	18	Kyzylorda	Asia & Oceania
Kenya	Magline Jeruto	24	Nairobi	Africa
Laos	Tonkham Phonchanheuang	20	Vientiane Prefecture	Asia & Oceania
Lebanon	Perla Helou	22	Baabda	Asia & Oceania
Lesotho	Mpoi Ma'hao	19	Maseru	Africa
Liberia	Wokie Dolo	25	Monrovia	Africa
Macau	Wan-Ling Lan	25	Macau	Asia & Oceania
Madagascar	Felana Tirindraza	22	Nosy Be	Africa
Malta	Michela Galea	25	Valletta	Europe
Mauritius	Bessika Bucktawor	21	Triolet	Africa
Mexico	Andrea Meza	23	Chihuahua City	America
Moldova	Ana Badaneu	20	Chișinău	Europe
Mongolia	Enkhjin Tseveendash	24	Ulaanbaatar	Asia & Oceania
Montenegro	Tea Babić	19	Podgorica	Europe
Myanmar	Ei Kyawt Khaing	19	Thandwe	Asia & Oceania
Nepal	Nikita Chandak	21	Urlabari	Asia & Oceania
Netherlands	Philisantha van Deuren	21	Almere	Europe
New Zealand	Annie Evans	19	Auckland	Asia & Oceania
Nicaragua	América Monserrath Allen	18	Rivas	America
Nigeria	Ugochi Ihezue	20	Birnin Kebbi	Africa
Northern Ireland	Anna Henry	22	Belfast	Europe
Norway	Celine Herregården	19	Drammen	Europe
Panama	Julianne Brittón	22	Panama City	America
Paraguay	Paola Oberladstatter	24	Ciudad del Este	America
Peru	Pamela Sánchez	22	Chachapoyas	America
Philippines	Laura Lehmann	23	Makati	Asia & Oceania
Poland	Magdalena Bieńkowska	24	Warsaw	Europe
Portugal	Filipa Barroso	18	Setúbal	Europe
Romania	Mihaela Bosca	26	Baia Mare	Europe
Russia	Polina Popova	22	Yekaterinburg	Asia & Oceania
Rwanda	Elsa Iradukunda	19	Northern Province	Africa
Scotland	Romy McCahill	23	Milngavie	Europe
Senegal	Nar Codou Diouf	20	Dakar	Africa
Serbia	Anđelija Rogić	22	Užice	Europe
Seychelles	Hilary Joubert	23	Victoria	Africa
Singapore	Laanya Ezra Asogan	21	Singapore	Asia & Oceania
Slovakia	Hanka Závodná	21	Bratislava	Europe
Slovenia	Maja Zupan	18	Britof	Europe
South Africa	Adè van Heerden	26	Herolds Bay	Africa
South Korea (Note: Competed as Korea in the pageant)	Ha-eun Kim	25	Seoul	Asia & Oceania
South Sudan	Arual Longar	20	Juba	Africa
Spain	Elisa Tulian	21	Majorca	Europe
Sri Lanka	Dusheni Silva	24	Colombo	Asia & Oceania
Sweden	Hanna Haag	20	Gävle	Europe
Tanzania	Julitha Kabete	21	Dar es Salaam	Africa
Thailand	Phatlada Kullaphakthanaphat	25	Bangkok	Asia & Oceania
Trinidad and Tobago	Chandini Chanka	23	Port of Spain	America
Tunisia	Emna Abdelhedi	22	Sfax	Africa
Turkey	Aslı Sümen	23	Mersin	Asia & Oceania
Ukraine	Polina Tkach	18	Kyiv	Europe
United States	Clarissa Bowers	20	Miami	America
Uruguay	Melina Carballo	21	Montevideo	America
Venezuela	Ana Carolina Ugarte	25	Maturín	America
Vietnam	Đỗ Mỹ Linh	21	Hanoi	Asia & Oceania
Wales	Hannah Williams	23	Cardiff	Europe
Zambia	Mary Chibula	22	Mongu	Africa
Zimbabwe	Chiedza Mhosva	22	Harare	Africa
