= MWJ =

MWJ may refer to:

- Microwave Journal, a technical journal
- Miss World Japan, a national beauty pageant in Japan
- Mystery Writers of Japan, an organization for mystery writers in Japan
