= Bayartsetseg Altangerel =

Mongolian actor

- Born: Bayartsetseg Altangerel; November 29, 1990 (age 35); Ulaanbaatar, Mongolia
- Beauty pageant titleholder
- Title: Miss International Mongolia 2014; Miss Earth Mongolia 2015; Miss World Mongolia 2016
- Major competitions: Miss International 2014 (Unplaced); Miss Earth 2015 (Top 16); (Miss Photogenic); Miss World 2016 (Top 11)

Bayartsetseg Altangerel (Mongolian: Алтангэрэлийн Баярцэцэг; born 29 November 1990), known professionally as Bayra Bela, is a Mongolian actress, producer, and Mongolian cultural envoy. She earned a Master's degree in Acting for Screen from the Royal Central School of Speech and Drama in London, financed through the prestigious Chevening Scholarship. Altangerel is also a model and beauty pageant titleholder, having represented Mongolia at Miss International 2014 (Unplaced), Miss Earth 2015 (top 15), and Miss World 2016 (top 11, Miss Talent, People's Choice). At Miss World, her placement was Mongolia's highest to date.

Altangerel produced "The Mongol Khan," the first-ever Mongolian play to premiere in London's West End at the Coliseum Theatre in 2023, and was subsequently staged at Singapore's Marina Bay Sands in 2024. In the play, Altangerel portrays Queen Tsetser alongside Mark Dacascos. Altangerel's acting career includes roles in the Amazon series The Power as Solongo, Netflix's Marco Polo, Steven Seagal's Attrition, and Christopher Coppola's Sacred Blood. She has also starred in numerous Mongolian films as a lead, showcasing her range and commitment to promoting Mongolian culture through cinema.

In 2024, the Government of Mongolia recognized her contributions by appointing her as a Cultural Envoy of Mongolia.

== Acting credits ==
=== Theatre ===
Year	Title	Role	Notes	Theatre	Country
2025	The Mongol Khan	Queen Tsetser	Also producer	Tokyo Forum Hall C	Tokyo, Japan
2025	The Mongol Khan	Queen Tsetser	Also producer	Aichi Prefecture Theatre	Nagoya, Japan
2024	The Mongol Khan	Queen Tsetser	Also producer	Sands Theatre	Singapore
2023	The Mongol Khan		Producer	London Coliseum	London, United Kingdom

=== Television ===
Year	Title	Role	Notes
2022	The Power	Solongo	3 episodes
2022	Molko	Tuya	
2016	Marco Polo	Bolormaa	1 episode

=== Film ===
Year	Title	Role	Notes
2022	Love	Sarnai	
2021	Shadow		Producer, Co-writer
2021	Kintsugi	Tuya	Producer, Co-writer
2020	The Collective	Cece	
2020	The Tale of the Mother	Mother	
2019	Blue Destiny	Badamtsetseg	
2019	I, The Sunshine	Mother	
2018	Cuckoo	Tuya	
2017	Attrition	San	
2017	Passer by	Ariunaa	
2016	My Wife is Spy	Maralaa	
2015	Sacred Blood	Aria	
2014	Deadbeats	Lilah	

=== Documentary ===
Year	Title	Role
2021	Eating Our Way to Extinction	Mongolia Fixer

=== Video Games ===
Year	Title	Role	Notes
2021	League of Legends	Udyr	Cultural Consultant
2021	Worldbreakers	Princess Khutulun	Voice, Cultural Consultant

Awards and achievements
Preceded by Anu Namshir	Miss World Mongolia; 2016	Succeeded by Enkhjin Tseveendash

Awards and achievements
Preceded by (Vietnam) Trần Ngọc Lan Khuê	Miss World; People's choice award winner 2016	Succeeded by (Mongolia) Enkhjin Tseveendash
Preceded by (Guyana) Lisa Punch	Miss World Talent; 2016	Succeeded by (Malta) Michela Galea
