= Miss World Mongolia =

Beauty pageant in Mongolia

- Formation: 2005
- Type: Beauty pageant
- Headquarters: Ulaanbaatar
- Location: Mongolia
- Members: Miss World; Miss Earth
- Official language: Mongolian

Miss World Mongolia, Miss Mongolia are the national beauty contest for unmarried women of Mongolia which is held annually with breaks. The winner represents Mongolia at the Miss World competition. The alleged winner would participate in the international beauty pageant Miss World.

Miss World Mongolia was held for first time in 2005. The pageant became the national franchise of Miss World in 2005–present, Miss Universe in 2018–present, and Miss International in 2001–present.

The current Miss World Mongolia is Enkhjin Tseveendash. She was crowned on 30 August 2017 in Holiday In Ulaanbaatar hotel and Conference Center.

== Titleholders ==
Color key

- Winner
- Runner-up
- Finalist
- Semi-finalist
- Quarter-finalist

Year	Miss World Mongolia	Venue	Placement	Notes
2005	Khongorzul Ganbat	Crown of Beauty Theatre, Sanya, China	Unplaced	
2006	Selenge Erdene-Ochir	Palace of Culture and Science, Warsaw, Poland	Unplaced	Miss World Talent 4th runner-up; Miss World Sports Top 24
2007	Gankhuyagiin Oyuungerel	Crown of Beauty Theatre, Sanya, China	Unplaced	Miss World Beach Beauty Top 21
2008	Anun Chinbat	Sandton Convention Centre, Johannesburg, South Africa	Unplaced	
2009	Battsetseg Batbaatar	Gallagher Convention Centre, Johannesburg, South Africa	Unplaced	
2010	Sarnai Amar	Crown of Beauty Theatre, Sanya, China	Top 25	Miss World Beach Beauty Top 40; Miss World Sports Top 20
2011	Buyankhishig Unurbayar	Earls Court Exhibition Centre, London, UK	Unplaced	
2012	Bayarmaa Huselbaatar	Dongsheng Fitness Center Stadium, Ordos City, China	Unplaced	Miss World Talent Top 15; Dances of the World performer; Miss World Top Model Top 20; Miss World Sports Top 24
2013	Pagmadulam Sukhbaatar	Bali Nusa Dua Convention Center, Bali, Indonesia	Unplaced	
2014	Battsetseg Turbat	ExCeL London, UK	Unplaced	Miss World Sports Top 32; Miss World Top Model Top 20; People's Choice Top 25; Dances of the World performer; Beauty with a Purpose Top 27
2015	Anu Namshir	Crown of Beauty Theatre, Sanya, China	Unplaced	Miss World Best Fashion Designer Award Top 10; Beauty with a Purpose Top 25; Miss World Talent Top 30
2016	Bayartsetseg Altangerel	MGM National Harbor, National Harbor, Maryland, US	Top 11	People's Choice winner; Miss World Talent winner; Miss World Multimedia 1st runner up; Beauty with a Purpose Top 24
2017	Enkhjin Tseveendash	Sanya City Arena, Sanya, China	Top 15	Dances of the World performer; People's Choice winner; Miss World Multimedia winner; Head-to-Head Challenge (Group 8) winner; Miss World Sport Top 23; Miss World Top Model Top 30; Beauty with a Purpose Top 20
2018	Erdenebaatar Enkhriimaa	Sanya City Arena, Sanya, China	Unplaced	Beauty with a Purpose Top 25
2019	Tsevelmaa Mandakh	ExCeL London, UK	Top 40	Head-to-Head Challenge (Group 4) winner; Miss World Multimedia 2nd runner up; Miss World Talent (Top 6); Beauty With a Purpose (Top 10)
2020	Due to the impact of COVID-19 pandemic, no pageant in 2020			
2021	Burte-Ujin Anu	Coca-Cola Music Hall, San Juan, Puerto Rico	Top 40	Miss World Talent; Head-to-Head Challenge (Round 2)
2022	Miss World 2021 was rescheduled to 16 March 2022 due to the COVID-19 pandemic outbreak in Puerto Rico, no edition started in 2022.			
2023	Bolor Bat-Erdene	Jio World Convention Centre, Mumbai, India	Unplaced	
2025	Erdenesuvd Batyabar	HITEX Exhibition Centre, Hyderabad, Telangana, India	Unplaced	Miss World Sports Top 32
2026	Enkhtuul Bayarsaikhan	April 2nd Square, Nha Trang, Khánh Hòa, Vietnam	Unplaced	

== Miss Earth Mongolia ==
Mongolia debuted at the Miss Earth in 2005. Between 2005 and 2013 Miss Earth Mongolia had selected by another agency. Begun in 2014 the previous winner Miss World Mongolia may compete at the Miss Earth pageant.

Year	Miss World Mongolia 1st princess	Province	Placement	Special Awards
2005	Sarnai Amar	Ulaanbaatar	Unplaced	
2010	Gantogoo Bayaarkhuu	Ulaanbaatar	Unplaced	
2012	Battsetseg Turbat	Ulaanbaatar	Unplaced	(bronze) Resorts Wear
2013	Bayartsatsral Baljinnyam	Ulaanbaatar	Unplaced	Best in Formal Wear
2014	Tugsuu Idersaikhan	Ulaanbaatar	Top 8	(silver) Cocktail Wear
2015	Bayartsetseg Altangerel	Ulaanbaatar	Top 16	(gold) Miss Photogenic; (gold) Evening Gown; (bronze) Cocktail Wear; Top 4 Mat Best Eco Video
2016	Enkhbor Azbileg	Ulaanbaatar	Unplaced	(gold) Talent (Group 3)
2017	Tugs Batjalgar	Ulaanbaatar	Unplaced	(silver) Eco-Video Presentation
2019	Azzaya Tsogt-Ochir	Ulaanbaatar	Unplaced	(gold) Talent (Fire group); (gold) National Costume (Asia & Oceania)
2020	Britta Battogtokh	Ulaanbaatar	Unplaced	(gold) Sport Wears
2022	Nandin Sergelen	Ulaanbaatar	Unplaced	
2023	Munkhchimeg Batjargal	Ulaanbaatar	Unplaced	
2024	Tselmeg Purevjal	Ulaanbaatar	Unplaced	
2025	Nomin-Erdene Bayarkhuu	Darkhan-Uul	Unplaced	

== Notes ==
- In 2008: Sarnai Amar won the title of World Miss University 2008 in Korea.
- In 2010 :Battsetseg Turbat top 10 the title of Asian Super Model 2010
- In 2015: Battsetseg Turbat top 10 the title of Miss Tourism Queen Of The Year International 2015 in Germany
- In 2015: Bayartsetseg Altangerel top 16 the title of Miss Earth 2015 in Austria
- In 2016: Anu Namshir won the title of Miss Tourism Queen International 2016 in China

== Gallery ==
=== Miss World Mongolia winners ===
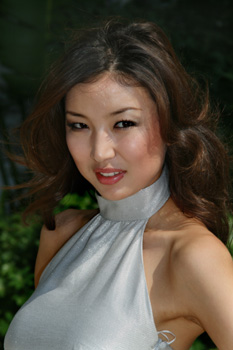
Miss World Mongolia 2007 Oyungerel Gankhuyag

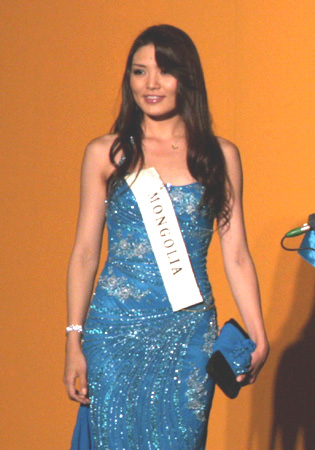
Miss World Mongolia 2008 Anun Chinbat

== See also ==
- Miss Mongolia
