= Miss Chinese Taipei =

Beauty pageant

Miss Taiwan
- Formation: 1960
- Type: Beauty pageant
- Headquarters: Taipei
- Location: Taiwan
- Members: Miss International
- Official language: Taiwanese Mandarin English

Miss Chinese Taipei (also known as Miss Taiwan), formerly known as Miss China is a national beauty pageant in Taiwan ("Chinese Taipei") since 1960. The first and second place titleholders have the opportunity to represent Taiwan at the third largest international beauty pageant, Miss International. The current 2023 titleholder of Miss Chinese Taipei is Oceana Ling-Kurie.

== History ==
=== 1960–1964 ===
Early in 1960 the Space Mass Communication sponsored the Taipei beauty contest and named as "Miss China". The winners became talent representatives of Chinese culture on world stages such as Miss Universe, Miss World and Miss International as "Miss Republic of China". The pageant existed between 1960 and 1964. The first title holder of 1960 was Janet Lin Chin-Yi who competed at the first annual Miss International 1960 in Long Beach, United States. The 1965 pageant was not held due to financial difficulties and controversies related to the personal lives of contestants. Following the end of official relations between Taiwan and the United States in 1979, proposals to restart the pageant focused on focused on making Taiwan more visible to the international community. Representatives of the Miss Universe contest visited Taiwan in 1984, to convince the government to resume the Miss China pageant, as mainland China refused to participate in such a "capitalistic activity". The Kuomintang government's official position through 1986 discouraged beauty pageants, citing the austerity policy in force at the time and its focus on the anti-communist war effort. After the 1986 winner of the Kaohsiung-based Miss Port City pageant placed third at the Miss Wonderland competition, Miss Universe organizers visited Taiwan again, and the ban on national beauty pageants was formally lifted in October 1987.

=== 1988–2004 ===
In April 1988 the pageant was revived as Miss Republic of China, followed by the 37th Miss Universe hosted by Taiwan, on May 24, 1988. Jade Hu Fei-Tsui, Miss Republic of China 1988 competed at the Miss Universe pageant. In 1993 the Miss Taiwan was not held annually.

With the launch of Miss China World in 2001, political implications forced Miss Taiwan to use the name "Miss Chinese Taipei". The name was first used in the 2004 competition.

== Titleholders ==
The following is a list of all Miss Chinese Taipei (Taiwan) titleholders since 1960.

Year	Miss Chinese Taipei	Chinese Name	Notes
1960	Janet Lin	珍妮特林	Miss Republic of China — Space Mass Communication Corporation
1961	Lily Wang	汪麗玲	
1962	Helen Liu	劉秀嫚	
1964	Lana Yu	于 儀	
1988	Jade Hu Fei-Tsui	胡翡翠	Miss Republic of China — Taipei Beauty Association · The 37th Miss Universe 1988 held in Taiwan
1989	Chen Yen-Ping	陳燕萍	
1990	Wen Tzui-Pin	溫翠蘋	
1991	Lin Shu-Chuan	林樹娟	
1992	Shih Hsiu-Chieh	施秀潔	Miss China/Taiwan — Taipei Tourism Association · Wore Miss China/Taiwan sash at Miss Universe 1992 in Bangkok, Thailand
1994	Joanne Wu Chung-Chun	吳忠君	Miss Taiwan — Jiang Bao-ying and Shih Huei (Miss Taiwan Pageant Association) · Wore a Taiwan R.O.C. sash at Miss Universe between 1994 and 1999
1995	Liao Chia-Yi	廖家儀	
1996	Chen Hsiao-Fen	陳曉芬	
1997	Chiou Kai-Ti	邱凱蒂	
1998	Annie Tsai	蔡慧瑛	
1999	Vivi Wang Wan-Fei	王婉霏	
2000	Chang Lei-Ann	張理安	Wore a Chinese Taipei sash at Miss Universe 2000 in Nicosia, Cyprus
2001/2002	Chiang Hsin-Ting	江欣婷	Wore a Taiwan sash at Miss Universe 2001 in San Juan, Puerto Rico
2003	Beverly Chen Szu-Yu	陳思羽	Wore a Chinese Taipei sash at Miss Universe 2003 in Panama City, Panama
2004	Janie Hsieh	謝宜臻	A last Miss Taiwan who wore Chinese Taipei sash at Miss Universe 2004 in Quito, Ecuador
2005	Kimberly Chin	陳家嘉	
2006/2007	Sasha Li	林羿汎	
2008	Jamie Lin	林洁明	
2009/2010	Chiou Yu-Ting	邱于婷	Miss Taiwan Beauty Association
2011/2012	Jenny Lu	盧貞伶	
2013/2014	Yan Yu-Yao	楊于瑤	
2015/2016	Chan Chan	陳海琳	
2017/2018	Kao Man-jung	高曼容	Face of Beauty International 3rd Runner Up
2019/2020	Zheng Ting-Yi	鄭婷怡	
2021/2022	Lo Yang	駱焉	
2023/2024	Oceana Ling-Kurie	林沛瑢（林小海）	

== Big Four pageants representatives ==
The following women have represented Chinese Taipei in the Big Four international beauty pageants, the four major international beauty pageants for women. These are Miss World, Miss Universe, Miss International and Miss Earth. '

=== Miss Universe Chinese Taipei ===
- : Declared as Winner
- : Ended as runner-up or top 5/6 qualification
- : Ended as one of the finalists or semifinalists
- : Ended as special awards winner

From 1960 to 2004 the winner of Miss Taiwan represented her country at the Miss Universe. On occasion, when the winner does not qualify (due to age) for either contest, a runner-up is sent.

Year	Miss Chinese Taipei	Placement at Miss Universe	Special Award(s)
Did not compete since 2005—Present
2004	Janie Hsieh Yu-Chen	Unplaced	
2003	Beverly Chen Szu-Yu	Unplaced	
Miss Taiwan
2002	Did not compete		
2001	Chiang Hsin-Ting	Unplaced	
Miss Chinese Taipei
2000	Chang Lei-Ann	Unplaced	
Miss Taiwan R.O.C.
1999	Wang Wan-Fei	Unplaced	
1998	Annie Tsai	Unplaced	
1997	Chiou Hai-Ta	Unplaced	
1996	Chen Hsiao-Fen	Unplaced	
1995	Liao Chia-Yi	Unplaced	
1994	Joanne Wu Chung-Chun	Unplaced	
Miss China/Taiwan
1993	Did not compete		
1992	Shih Hsiu-Chieh	Unplaced	
Miss Republic of China
1991	Lin Shu-Chuan	Unplaced (45th)	
1990	Wen Tzui-Pin	Unplaced (11th)	
1989	Chen Yen-Ping	Unplaced	
1988	Jade Hu Fei-Tsui	Unplaced	
Did not compete between 1965—1987
1964	Lana Yu Yi	4th Runner-up	
1963	Did not compete		
1962	Helen Liu Shiu-Man	3rd Runner-up	
1961	Lily Wang Li-Ling	Top 15	

=== Miss World Chinese Taipei ===
- : Declared as Winner
- : Ended as runner-up or top 5/6 qualification
- : Ended as one of the finalists or semifinalists
- : Ended as special awards winner

From 1960 to 2004 the Runner-up of Miss Taiwan represented her country at the Miss World. In 2005 and 2008 the winner went to Miss World and 2013 there was Miss World official selection to select Taiwanese representatives separately. On occasion, when the winner does not qualify (due to age) for either contest, a runner-up is sent.

Year	Miss World Chinese Taipei	Placement at Miss World	Special Award(s)
Did not compete since 2014—Present
2013	Chang Shao-Chuan	Unplaced	
Did not compete between 2009—2012
2008	Jamie Lin Chieh-min	Unplaced	
Did not compete between 2006—2007
2005	Hsu Su-Jung	Unplaced	
2004	Dorothy Chu Yi-Hui	Unplaced	
Did not compete between 2001—2003
2000	Hao Shu-Ting	Unplaced	
Taiwanese representatives from Miss Taiwan R.O.C.
1999	Did not compete		
1998	Chen Yi-Ju	Unplaced	
1997	Fang Su-Ling	Unplaced	
1996	Chen Hsiao-Fen	Unplaced	
1995	Hsu Chun-Chun	Unplaced	
1994	Joanne Wu Chung-Chun	Unplaced	
Taiwanese representatives from Miss China/Taiwan
1993	Virginia Long Wei-Yen	Unplaced	
1992	Cheng Wei-Wei	Unplaced	
Taiwanese representatives from Miss Republic of China
1991	Rebecca Lin Lan-Chih	Unplaced	
1990	Did not compete		
1989	Wang Min-Yei	Unplaced	
1988	Wu Yi-Ning	Unplaced	
Did not compete between 1963—1987
1964	Linda Lin Su-hsing	2nd Runner-up	
1963	Did not compete		
1962	Roxsana Chiang	Unplaced	
1961	Grace Li Shiu-ying	1st Runner-up	

=== Miss International Chinese Taipei ===
- : Declared as Winner
- : Ended as runner-up or top 5/6 qualification
- : Ended as one of the finalists or semifinalists
- : Ended as special awards winner

From 1960 to 2004 one of the Runner-ups of Miss Taiwan represented her country at the Miss International. Since 2005 Taiwan set the own winner to Miss International and recent years the Miss Taiwan Beauty Association took over the franchise to the main winner for having chance at Miss International. On occasion, when the winner does not qualify (due to age) for either contest, a runner-up is sent.

Year	Miss International Chinese Taipei	Placement at Miss International	Special Award(s)
2026	Hsin-Hui Chen	TBA	
2025	Yi-Han Chiu	Unplaced	
2024	Oceana Ling-Kurie	Top 20 (13th)	Miss Fitness (4th place)
2023	Anita Wang	Unplaced	
2022	Joanne Ting-Yi Zheng	Unplaced	
Due to the impact of COVID-19 pandemic, no pageant between 2020 and 2021
2019	Joyce Yi Shu-Chiu	Unplaced	
2018	Kao Man-jung	Unplaced	
2017	Xie Lingci	Unplaced	
2016	Tan Ai-Ning	Unplaced	
2015	Yan Chen-ning	Unplaced	
2014	Yan Yu-Yao	Unplaced	
2013	Did not compete		
2012	Yu Nian-yu	Unplaced	
2011	Ying Kuei-Li	Unplaced	
2010	Chen Yi-Wei	Unplaced	
2009	Chen Yi-Chih	Unplaced	
2008	Ting Yen-Yu	Unplaced	
2007	Hung Tzu-Wei	Unplaced	
2006	Liu Tzu-Hsuan	Unplaced	
2005	Li Yen-Chin	Unplaced	
Did not compete between 2001—2004
2000	Chiang Hsin-Ting	Unplaced	
Taiwanese representatives from Miss Republic of China
1964	Philippina Chao Ling-Yu	Unplaced	
1963	Did not compete		
1962	Anne Yui Fang	Top 15	
1961	Dolly Ma	Top 15	
1960	Janet Lin Chin-Yi	Unplaced	

=== Miss Earth Chinese Taipei ===
- : Declared as Winner
- : Ended as runner-up or top 5/6 qualification
- : Ended as one of the finalists or semifinalists
- : Ended as special awards winner

Year	Miss Earth Chinese Taipei	Placement at Miss Earth	Special Award(s)
Did not compete since 2018—Present
2017	Amelie Zhao	Unplaced	(bronze) Talent (Group 2)
2016	Joanne Peng	Unplaced	
2015	Ting Wen-Yin	Did not compete	
2014	Chen Kuan-lien	Unplaced	(bronze) Best Talent
2013	Lyu Ying-Li	Unplaced	
2012	Lu Jen-Ling	Unplaced	(silver) Miss Friendship (Group 1); (bronze) Best Talent (Group 1)
2011	Cherry Liu	Top 16	Miss Photogenic; Miss Ever Bilena
2010	Liu Hsing-Jung	Unplaced	
2009	Chen Yi-Wen	Unplaced	
2008	Yin Yin-Tsai	Unplaced	
2007	Sonya Lee	Unplaced	
2006	Chui Yu-Cheng	Unplaced	
2005	Lin Yi-Fan	Unplaced	
2004	Angel Wu	Unplaced	
Did not compete between 2002—2003
2001	Liza Chao Yun-Hsiu	Unplaced	

- Note: From 2001 to 2006, Miss Taiwan used the sash Taiwan R.O.C. In 2007, she used the sash Taiwan. From 2008, Taiwan changed the sash Chinese Taipei.
