= Miss International 2018 =

58th Miss International pageant

- Date: 9 November 2018
- Presenters: Tetsuya Bessho; Niki
- Entertainment: Orienta-Rhythm; Da Pump; One Voice Children's Choir
- Theme: “Cheer All Women”
- Venue: Tokyo Dome City Hall, Tokyo, Japan
- Broadcaster: Host Broadcaster: Ustream; PlayStation Network; Niconico; YouTube; Indosiar; Panamericana Television; NHK; Co-host Broadcaster: TV Tokyo
- Entrants: 77
- Placements: 15
- Withdrawals: Belarus; Cambodia; Gibraltar; Lithuania; Norway; Sierra Leone; Tunisia
- Returns: Argentina; Aruba; Côte d'Ivoire; Cuba; Denmark; Egypt; Germany; Guam; Kenya; Madagascar; Northern Mariana Islands; Puerto Rico; Romania; Sri Lanka; Zimbabwe
- Winner: Mariem Velazco; Venezuela

Miss International 2018 was the 58th edition of the Miss International pageant, held at the Tokyo Dome City Hall in Tokyo, Japan, on 9 November 2018.

Kevin Lilliana Junaedy of Indonesia crowned Mariem Velazco of Venezuela as her successor at the end of the event. This marks Venezuela's eighth victory at Miss International - the most in the pageant's history.

A total of 78 contestants from countries and territories competed in this year's Miss International pageant, surpassing the previous record of 73 contestants in 2014, making the biggest turnout in the pageant's history.

== Background ==
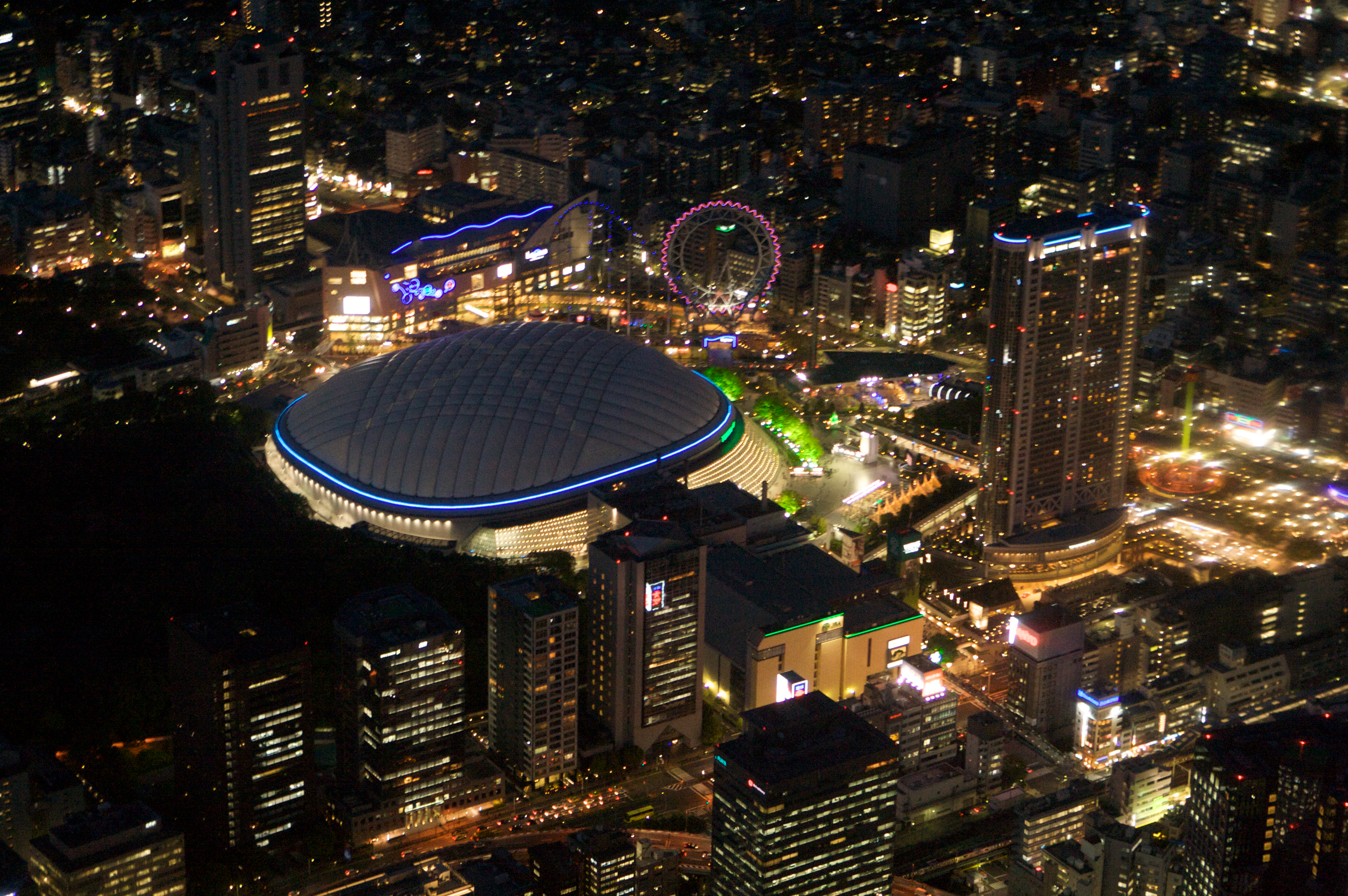
Tokyo Dome City Hall, the venue of Miss International 2018

=== Location and date ===
On 12 April 2018, it was announced during a website conference by Akemi Shimomura, the president of the International Cultural Association and the president of Miss International Organization, that the 2018 pageant would be held in Tokyo Dome City Hall, Bunkyo, Tokyo, Japan, for the third consecutive year on Friday, November 9, 2018.

== Results ==
=== Placements ===
Placement	Contestant
Miss International 2018	Venezuela – Mariem Velazco
1st Runner-Up	Philippines – Ahtisa Manalo
2nd Runner-Up	South Africa – Reabetswe Sechoaro
3rd Runner-Up	Romania – Bianca Tirsin
4th Runner-Up	Colombia – Anabella Castro
Top 8	Ecuador – Michelle Huet; Japan – Hinano Sugimoto; Spain – Susana Sánchez
Top 15	Australia – Emily Tokić; Indonesia – Vania Fitryanti Herlambang; Madagascar – Esmeralda Malleka; Mexico – Nebai Torres; Paraguay – Daisy Lezcano; Thailand – Keeratiga Jaruratjamon; Ukraine – Bohdana Tarasyk

=== Continental queens ===
Continental Group	Contestant
Africa	South Africa – Reabetswe Sechoaro
America	Argentina – Rocío Pérez
Asia	Singapore – Eileen Feng
Europe	Netherlands – Zoë Amber Niewold
Oceania	Guam – Diliana Tuncap

== Pageant ==
Unlike in 2017 contestants were classified under five continents: (1) Europe, (2) Oceania, (3) Africa, (4) Americas, and (5) Asia. During the Competitions Rounds; National Costume, Swimwear, and Evening Gown, then the contestants were trimmed down to 15 Semifinalists, after which, the judges narrowed the finalists down to the Top 8, then judges decided the Top 8 to compete in the question and answer portion. and then the judges choose Top 5 which Miss International 2018 and her four Runners-up like 2017 format.

== Contestants ==
77 contestants competed for the title.

Country/Territory	Contestant	Age	Hometown	Continental group
Argentina	Rocío Magalí Pérez (Note: ARGENTINA – Rocio Pérez was appointed to represent Argentina at Miss International 2018 pageant, by Belleza Argentina Organization, official franchise holder of Miss International in Argentina.)	22	Buenos Aires	Americas
Aruba	Stephanie Anouk Eman (Note: ARUBA – Stephanie Helen Anouk was appointed to represent Aruba at Miss International 2018 pageant, by Srta. Aruba, official franchise holder of Miss International in Aruba. Stephanie was Miss World Aruba 2017.)	26	Oranjestad	Americas
Australia	Emily Tokić	20	Canberra	Oceania
Belgium	Kelly Quanten (Note: BELGIUM – Kelly Quanten was appointed as "Miss International Belgium 2018" after an online casting call took place.)	24	Leuven	Europe
Bolivia	María Elena Antelo	24	Beni	Americas
Brazil	Stephanie Pröglhöf	24	São José dos Campos	Americas
Canada	Camila Gonzalez	21	Toronto	Americas
Chile	María Pía Vilches	22	La Ligua	Americas
China	Wang Chaoyuan	24	Tianjin	Asia
Colombia	Anabella Castro (Note: COLOMBIA – Anabella Castro was appointed to represent Colombia at Miss International 2018 pageant, by Raymundo Angulo Pizarro the President of Señorita Colombia pageant after the 2018 edition winner is setting to represent Colombia in 2019 season. Anabella was Top 10, as Señorita Cesar at Señorita Colombia 2017.)	21	Valledupar	Americas
Cook Islands	Louisa Purea	20	Avarua	Oceania
Costa Rica	Glennys Medina Segura	23	Guanacaste	Americas
(Ivory Coast) Côte d'Ivoire	Jemima Gbato	21	Abidjan	Africa
Cuba	Jennifer Alvarez Ruíz	24	Havana	Americas
Curaçao	Diöna Angela	21	Willemstad	Americas
Czech Republic	Daniela Zálešáková	19	Most	Europe
Denmark	Louise Arild	23	Frederiksberg	Europe
Dominican Republic	Stéphanie Bustamante	25	Paterson	Americas
Ecuador	Michelle Huet	23	Guayaquil	Americas
Egypt	Farah Sedky	24	Cairo	Africa
El Salvador	Ena Cea	20	Santa Ana	Americas
Ethiopia	Frezewd Solomon	21	Addis Ababa	Africa
Finland	Eevi Ihalainen	18	Lappeenranta	Europe
France	Mélanie Labat	23	Poussan	Europe
Germany	Franciska Acs	23	Düsseldorf	Europe
Ghana	Benedicta Nana Adjei	22	Accra	Africa
Guadeloupe	Sarah Eruam	18	Le Gosier	Americas
Guam	Diliana Tuncap	22	Hagåtña	Oceania
Guatemala	Gabriela Castillo	20	Guatemala City	Americas
Haiti	Cassandra Chéry (Note: HAITI – Cassandra Chéry was appointed to represent Haiti at Miss International 2018 pageant, by Miss Haiti Organizationas as a replacement to the original winner Merlie Fleurizard who is not able to compete at this year pageant due to over age. Chery was Miss Haiti 2017.)	23	Port-au-Prince	Americas
Hawaii	Olivia Evelyn Walls	21	Honolulu	Oceania
Honduras	Valeria Cardona (Note: HONDURAS – Valeria Cardona was appointed to represent Honduras at Miss International 2018 pageant, by Miss Honduras Organizationas as a replacement to the original winner Mayra Fuentes who is not able to compete at this year pageant due to lack of preparation.)	20	Tegucigalpa	Americas
Hong Kong	Carmaney Wong	24	Kowloon	Asia
Hungary	Frida Maczkó	22	Vác	Europe
India	Tanishqa Bhosale	19	Pune	Asia
Indonesia	Vania Fitryanti Herlambang	21	Tangerang	Asia
Japan	Hinano Sugimoto	21	Tokyo	Asia
Kenya	Ivy Nyangasi Mido (Note: KENYA – Ivy Mido was designated to compete at Miss International pageant in Japan. She was Miss Supranational Kenya 2017.)	22	Nairobi	Africa
Laos	Piyamarth Phounpaseuth	24	Vientiane Prefecture	Asia
Lebanon	Rachel Younan	23	Beirut	Asia
Macau	Cherry Chin	24	Taipa	Asia
Madagascar	Esmeralda Malleka	25	Vohemar	Africa
Malaysia	Mandy Loo	22	Georgetown	Asia
Mauritius	Ashna Nookooloo	22	Curepipe	Africa
Mexico	Nebai Torres (Note: MEXICO – Nebai Torres was appointed to represent Mexico at Miss International 2018 pageant, by Lupita Jones the President of Mexicana Universal pageant. Nebai was the 4th Runner-up at Mexicana Universal 2018.)	25	Guadalajara	Americas
Moldova	Daniela Marin (Note: MOLDOVA – Daniela Marin was appointed to represent Moldova at Miss International 2018 pageant, by Miss Moldova committee. Daniela was the winner of Miss Moldova 2016 who competed at Miss World 2016 in the United States.)	19	Leova	Europe
Mongolia	Munkhchimeg Batjargal	20	Ulaanbaatar	Asia
Myanmar	May Yu Khatar	19	Yangon	Asia
Nepal	Ronali Amatya	22	Kathmandu	Asia
Netherlands	Zoë Amber Niewold	20	Assen	Europe
New Zealand	Natasha Kristina Unkovich	24	East Auckland	Oceania
Nicaragua	Stefanía Alemán	27	Masaya	Americas
Northern Mariana Islands	Celine Cabrera	23	Saipan	Oceania
Panama	Shirel Ortiz	22	Panama City	Americas
Paraguay	Daisy Diana Lezcano Rojas	24	San Lorenzo	Americas
Peru	Marelid Elizabeth Medina	24	Callao	Americas
Philippines	Maria Ahtisa Manalo	21	Candelaria	Asia
Poland	Marta Pałucka	26	Sopot	Europe
Portugal	Carina Neto	21	Gondomar	Europe
Puerto Rico	Yarelis Salgado (Note: PUERTO RICO – Yarelis Salgado was appointed to represent Puerto Rico at Miss International 2018 pageant, by Nuestra Belleza Puerto Rico Organization after a year of absence because Hurricane Maria destroyed the country. Yarelis was 2nd Runner-up at Miss Mundo Puerto Rico 2018.)	24	Toa Alta	Americas
Romania	Bianca Tirsin	20	Arad	Europe
Russia	Galina Lukina	26	Ufa	Asia
Singapore	Eileen Feng	22	Singapore City	Asia
Slovakia	Radka Grendová	20	Revúca	Europe
South Africa	Reabetswe Sechoaro	24	Pretoria	Africa
South Korea	Yejin Seo (Note: KOREA – Yejin Seo was appointed to represent South Korea at Miss International 2018 pageant, by Hanju E&M Miss Korea Organization which is the national franchise holder of Miss International in South Korea. Seo was one of the two 1st runners-up at Miss Korea 2018.)	21	Seoul	Asia
Spain	Susana Sánchez	25	Huelva	Europe
Sri Lanka	Natalee Fernando	24	Colombo	Asia
Sweden	Izabell Hahn	26	Linköping	Europe
Taiwan	Kao Man-jung	21	Taichung	Asia
Thailand	Keeratiga Jaruratjamon	23	Phitsanulok	Asia
Ukraine	Bohdana Tarasyk	23	Kryvyi Rih	Europe
United Kingdom	Sharon Gaffka	22	Oxford	Europe
United States	Bonnie Walls	24	New York City	Americas
Venezuela	Mariem Velazco	20	San Tomé	Americas
Vietnam	Nguyễn Thúc Thùy Tiên (Note: VIETNAM – Nguyễn Thúc Thuỳ Tiên was appointed to compete at Miss International 2018 pageant by Sen Vang Entertainment, the franchise holder of Miss International in Vietnam, as a replacement to the original winner Nguyễn Thị Thuý An who was not able to compete at this year's pageant due to unexpected health problems. Tiên was the 3rd runner-up at Miss Vietnam 2018 pageant.)	20	Ho Chi Minh City	Asia
Zimbabwe	Tania Tatenda Aaron	22	Harare	Africa

== Notes ==
=== Returns ===
Last competed in 1961:

- Madagascar

Last competed in 1999:

- Côte d'Ivoire

Last competed in 2011:

- Zimbabwe

Last competed in 2014:

- Egypt
- Germany

Last competed in 2015:

- Kenya
- Romania

Last competed in 2016:

- Argentina
- Aruba
- Cuba
- Denmark
- Guam
- Northern Mariana Islands
- Puerto Rico
- Sri Lanka
