= Lui Watanabe =

Japanese actress and model (born 1983)

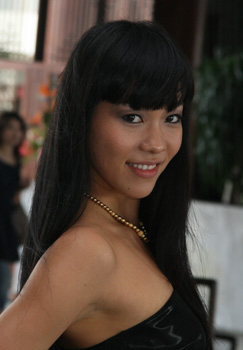
- Lui Watanabe during Miss World
- Born: Rui Watanabe; 6 December 1983 (age 42); Tokyo, Japan
- Height: 5 ft 7 in (1.70 m)
- Beauty pageant titleholder
- Title: Miss World Japan 2007
- Hair color: Black
- Eye color: Brown
- Major competition: Miss Universe Japan 2008 (finalist)

Lui Watanabe (渡部 累, Watanabe Rui) (born 6 December 1983) is a Japanese actress and beauty pageant titleholder who represented Japan in Miss World 2007 in China. She was also one of the finalists of the 2008 edition of Miss Universe Japan. She launched her own yoga company Sunroom Yoga in 2011.

== Early life ==
Born and raised in Yoyogi, Tokyo, Watanabe graduated from Kanto International Senior High School in 2001 and speaks fluent English. From 2004 until 2007 she worked as a fitness instructor at a Central Fitness Club at Tennozu Isle, Tokyo, and held an ambition to take lessons in Hong Kong to become an Asian action actress.

She acted as a supervising director on former kickboxing legend and four-time K-1 World Champion Ernesto Hoost's DVD 'Perfect Combat Part.1.”

== Miss World Japan 2007 ==
Watanabe was selected as the representative of Japan for Miss World 2007 and was assisted in her preparations for the competition by French fashion and beauty expert Ines Ligron and Miss Universe Japan 2003, Miyako Miyazaki.

She lived with the contestants from around the world for one month during November and appeared at the 57th Miss World pageant held at the Crown of Beauty Theatre, Sanya, People's Republic of China on December 1, 2007. The 106 contestants recorded the official torch relay anthem "Light the Passion, Share the Dream" for the 2008 Olympic Games as a major cooperation between the Beijing Olympic Committee and Miss World. The song had its first broadcast to a global audience at the 57th Miss World final.

In addition, to coincide with World AIDS Day, the pageant presented a special tribute to the fight against AIDS, with a televised speech from former South African President Nelson Mandela and the presence of his daughter and grandson, along with traditional dancers from South Africa who joined the contestants in a special song.

Watanabe, at the time using her birth-name of Rui Watanabe, placed in the Top 21 of the Miss World Beach Beauty section of the competition, on November 10, and the Top 16 of Miss World Sports on November 14.

== Miss Universe Japan 2008 ==
In 2008, Watanabe competed with 4000 entrants for the title of Miss Universe Japan, placing in the top ten at the final on April 3 held at Tokyo International Forum. Watanabe then became the face and image of Guthy-Renker skin care and fitness products, including for a DVD of Colombian dance fitness program Zumba, on TV and web media.

On September 6, 2008, she appeared at the seventh Tokyo Girls Collection held at Yoyogi National Stadium as a model for hairdressers Toni & Guy. She also appeared as a model for American fashion designer Betsey Johnson at a festival for breast cancer awareness charity Pink Ribbon.

From 18 April to 5 May 2009, Watanabe appeared on stage in TBS's musical 'Missing Boys: A Tribute to Yutaka Ozaki' held at Akasaka Act Theater.

From May 2009, she became the cover star for fitness magazine Fitness Journal for over one year, appearing on every consecutive cover and became more interested in yoga, participating in fashion shows as a fitness model.

In 2010, Watanabe worked as a catalogue model for Oshman's Sporting Goods and swimsuit model for female fashion apparel brand Roxy.

In 2011 she appeared in a 20th anniversary film for Armani Exchange and was a stage model for the brand.

== Yoga career ==
Watanabe began taking yoga lessons in 2004 and studied as an instructor with the Yoga Alliance from 2010 at YogaJaya. In a 2012 interview she stated that "modeling is a job where you are always treated like merchandise, and your self-worth is determined by judgments based on what is on the outside. So the secret to being able to remain true to yourself is doing your job while recognizing your own true value, so that you don’t lose sight of yourself. I learned that from yoga."

From 2011, Watanabe began giving yoga classes in studios and at luxury hotels such as Conrad and Ritz Carlton. She created her own brand 'Sunroom Yoga' to begin organizing outdoor classes in parks and on beaches with the theme "Yoga among trees and nature, under the sky."

From April 2012, Sunroom Yoga began a three-month tie-up with American clothing company Gap and Fox TV for a series of 'Gap x FOX' outdoor yoga events, TV and video productions called 'Yoga Experience with GapFit' in which Watanabe was the main instructor. Locations for events included in Yoyogi Park and at Fox TV Beach House in Yuigahama, Kamakura.

On August 26, 2012, Watanabe gave a special morning yoga class on the beach in front of the Armani Exchange Beach Lounge in Yuigahama as part of the 'BODY BEACH@A/X Beach Lounge' event.

She gave a lecture on the history of yoga at Japan's largest yoga event, Yoga Fest, held in Yokohama on the weekend of September 21, 2012.

== CSR activities ==
On 23 February 2013, Watanabe was made an ambassador for the Japanese National Trust.

Preceded by Kazuha Kondo	Miss World Japan; 2007	Succeeded by Mizuki Kubodera
