= Haruka Yamashita =

Miss World Japan 2017

- Born: Haruka Yamashita; 28 November 1995 (age 30); Tokyo, Japan
- Height: 1.73 m (5 ft 8 in)
- Beauty pageant titleholder
- Title: Miss World Japan 2017
- Hair color: Black
- Eye color: Brown
- Major competitions: Miss World Japan 2017 (Winner); Miss World 2017 (Top 15)

Haruka Yamashita (Japanese: 山下 晴加, Hepburn: Yamashita Haruka; born 28 November 1995) is a Japanese model and beauty pageant titleholder who won the Miss World Japan 2017 and represented Japan at Miss World 2017. She also went to Thailand to shoot a television series Oh My Boss where she played a Japanese top idol in a few episodes.

== Personal life ==
Haruka was born in Tokyo, graduated with a Bachelor of Laws from Keio University in 2018, worked for 4 years at Morgan Stanley as an Investment Banking analyst and is currently an MBA student at MIT Sloan School of Management.

== Pageantry ==
=== Miss World Japan 2017 ===
On September 4, 2017 Yamashita was crowned as Miss World Japan 2017 by Priyanka Yoshikawa Miss World Japan 2016 and Top 20 in Miss World 2016. She represented Japan in Miss World 2017.

=== Miss World 2017 ===
She competed at the Miss World 2017 where she placed Top 15.

== Filmography ==
=== Television ===
Year	Title	Role	Notes	Ref.
2021	Oh My Boss	Miyakawa Arsuuki (Japanese idols)	Support role	

Awards and achievements
Preceded by Priyanka Yoshikawa	Miss World Japan; 2017	Succeeded by Kanako Date
