= Enkhjin Tseveendash =

Mongolian model

Enkhjin Tseveendash Цэвээндашийн Энхжин
- Born: Tseveendashyn Enkhjin; May 2, 1994 (age 32); Ulaanbaatar, Mongolia
- Height: 174 cm (5 ft 9 in)
- Beauty pageant titleholder
- Title: Miss Mongolia 2015 (2nd Runner up); Miss World Mongolia 2017
- Hair color: Black
- Eye color: Brown
- Major competitions: Miss Globe International 2010; Miss Friendship International 2010(1st runner up); Supermodel International 2012(Top 6); Miss World 2017 (Top 15) (People's Choice Award Winner) (Multimedia Winner) (Head to Head challenge Winner) (BWAP Top 20) (Miss Sports Top 32)

Enkhjin Tseveendash (born May 2, 1994) is a Mongolian model and beauty pageant titleholder who represented Mongolia in Miss Globe International 2010, Miss Friendship International 2010, Supermodel International 2012 and Miss World 2017 pageant. she is the owner of Eden Design.

== General references ==
- Simeon (30 August 2017). "Enkhjin Tseveendash is Miss World Mongolia 2017". indianandworldpageant.com.
