= Miss Equatorial Guinea =

Beauty pageant

Miss Guinea Ecuatorial Organización
- Formation: 2012; 14 years ago
- Type: Beauty pageant
- Headquarters: Malabo
- Location: Equatorial Guinea
- Members: Miss Universe; Miss World; Miss International; Miss Supranational
- Official language: Spanish
- President: Consuelo Obiang Mbulito
- Key people: Agencia Mogue
- Website: agenciamogue.com

Miss Equatorial Guinea (traditionally known as Miss Guinea Ecuatorial) is a national Beauty pageant in Equatorial Guinea where the winner goes to Miss Universe pageant.

== History ==
Began in 2012 the Miss Equatorial Guinea is an annual pageant who responsible for selecting Equatorial Guinea's representative to the Miss World pageant. The pageant is held by Agencia Mouge. In recent year the organization took over the licenses of Miss Universe and Miss International for the first time.

=== Franchise holders ===
Started in 2019 since the Mogue official franchisor of Miss Universe, Miss World and Miss International; three winners divided into three categories such as Miss Equatorial Guinea (ultimate winner goes to Miss Universe), Miss Mundo Equatorial Guinea and Miss Internacional Equatorial Guinea.

=== Directorships ===
- Consuelo Obiang Mbulito (2012)

== Formats ==
The Miss Equatorial Guinea competition is traditionally holding municipality representation every year. At Miss Equatorial Guinea, every year the amount of candidates is different, it said that not all municipalities will compete at the Miss Equatorial Guinea competition. It depends on municipality applicant number then the organization will select the candidates based on their municipalities. During the pageant program, the Miss Mundo Equatorial Guinea who will send to Miss World would select independently earlier. In the finale result there will be Second Runner-up, First Runner-up, then finally Miss Equatorial Guinea winner. In another part, the organization will crown one of the runners-up to be Miss Internacional Equatorial Guinea title.

- Miss Annobón (province)
- Miss Aconibe
- Miss Akurenam
- Miss Añisok
- Miss Ayene
- Miss Baney
- Miss Rebola
- Miss Bata
- Miss Batete
- Miss Bicurga
- Miss Bidjabidján
- Miss Bitica
- Miss Cabo San Juan
- Miss Cogo
- Miss Corisco
- Miss Djibloho
- Miss Ebebiyín
- Miss Evinayong
- Miss Luba
- Miss Machinda
- Miss Malabo
- Miss Mbere
- Miss Mbini
- Miss Mengomeyén
- Miss Micomeseng
- Miss Moca
- Miss Mongomo
- Miss Ncue
- Miss Niefang
- Miss Nkimi
- Miss Nkumekien
- Miss Nsang
- Miss Nsok-Nsomo
- Miss Nsork
- Miss Nzangayong
- Miss Rebola
- Miss Riaba
- Miss Río Campo
- Miss Teguete

== Titleholders ==
Year	Miss Guinea Ecuatorial	Municipality
2012	Jennifer Riveiro Ilende	Malabo
2013	Restituta Mifumu Nguema	Micomeseng
2014	Agnes Genoveva Cheba Abé	Luba
2016	Anunciación Ongueme Esono	Micomeseng
2017	Catalina Mangue Ondo	Mongomo
2018	Silvia Adjomo Ndong	Malabo
2019	Serafina Nchama Eyene Ada	Niefang
2021	Chelsea Martina Mituy Avomo	Ebibeyin
2022	Alba Isabel Obama Moliko	Mbini
2023	Diana-Lita Hinestrosa Eraul	Corisco
2024	Diana Dashaira Angono Mouhafo	Malabo
2025	Carmen Ismelda Avomo Obama	Wele-Nzas

== Titleholders under Miss Guinea Equatorial org. ==
=== Miss Universo Guinea Ecuatorial ===
- : Declared as Winner
- : Ended as runner-up or top 5/6 qualification
- : Ended as one of the finalists or semifinalists
- : Ended as special awards winner

Year	Municipality	Miss Universo Guinea Equatorial	Placement at Miss Universe	Special awards	Notes
Consuelo Obiang Mbulito directorship — a franchise holder to Miss Universe from 2019
2026	Centro Sur	Teresa Isabel Mbomio	TBA		
2025	Wele-Nzas	Carmen Ismelda Avomo Obama	Unplaced		
2024	Malabo	Diana Dashaira Angono Mouhafo	Unplaced		
2023	Corisco	Diana-Lita Hinestrosa Eraul	Unplaced		
2022	Mbini	Alba Isabel Obama Moliko	Unplaced		
2021	Ebibeyin	Chelsea Martina Mituy Avomo	Unplaced		
Due to the impact of COVID-19 pandemic, no representative in 2020
2019	Niefang	Serafina Nchama Eyene Ada	Unplaced		

=== Miss Mundo Guinea Ecuatorial ===
- : Declared as Winner
- : Ended as runner-up or top 5/6 qualification
- : Ended as one of the finalists or semifinalists
- : Ended as special awards winner

Year	Municipality	Miss Mundo Guinea Equatorial	Placement at Miss World	Special awards	Notes
Consuelo Obiang Mbulito directorship — a franchise holder to Miss World from 2012
2025	Akurenam	Estela Nguema	Unplaced		
Miss World 2023 was rescheduled to 2024 due to the change of host and when entering India as the new host, there were several issues that caused the postponement until March 2024.
2023	Akurenam	Estela Nguema Mangue	Did not compete		
2022	Ebibeyin	Vanila Andeme	Did not compete		
Miss World 2021 was rescheduled to 16 March 2022 due to the COVID-19 pandemic outbreak in Puerto Rico, no edition started in 2022.
2021	Malabo	Gladys Adjaba	Unplaced		
Due to the impact of COVID-19 pandemic, no competition held in 2020
2019	Malabo	Djanet Ortiz Oyono	Unplaced	Miss World Sport (Top 32)	
2018	Micomeseng	Silvia Adjomo Ndong	Unplaced		
2017	Mongomo	Catalina Mangue Ondo Biye	Unplaced		
2016	Micomeseng	Anunciación Onguene Esono	Unplaced		
Did not compete in 2015
2014	Luba	Agnes Genoveva Cheba Abé	Unplaced		
2013	Micomeseng	Restituta Mifumu Nguema Okomo	Unplaced		
2012	Luba	Jennifer Riveiro Ilende	Unplaced		

=== Miss Internacional Guinea Ecuatorial ===
- : Declared as Winner
- : Ended as runner-up or top 5/6 qualification
- : Ended as one of the finalists or semifinalists
- : Ended as special awards winner

Year	Municipality	Miss International Guinea Equatorial	Placement at Miss International	Special awards	Notes
Consuelo Obiang Mbulito directorship — a franchise holder to Miss International from 2019
2024	Corisco	Jesica Maken	Did not compete		
2023	Malabo	Nieves Lohoba Bilora	Did not compete		
2022	Akonibe	Maria Marta Asong	Did not compete		
2021	Annobón	Victoria Kalu Gerona	No pageant		
Due to the impact of COVID-19 pandemic, no competition held in 2020
2019	Baney	Arsenia Chanque Bosepe	Unplaced		

=== Miss Supranacional Guinea Ecuatorial ===
- : Declared as Winner
- : Ended as runner-up or top 5/6 qualification
- : Ended as one of the finalists or semifinalists
- : Ended as special awards winner

Year	Municipality	Miss Supranational Guinea Equatorial	Placement at Miss Supranational	Special awards	Notes
Consuelo Obiang Mbulito directorship — a franchise holder to Miss Supranational from 2011
2011	Malabo	Nerre Priscila Barila Buale	Unplaced		
2013	Malabo	Lisa Cristina Ngonde Mbuanangongo	Unplaced		
2014	Malabo	María Begoña Andeme Obama	Unplaced		
2015	Malabo	María Antonia Nach Teruel	Unplaced		
2018	Malabo	María Lucrecia Nve Maleva	Unplaced		
2019	Mbini	Alba Isabel Obama	Unplaced		
