= Guan Siyu =

Chinese model and beauty pageant titleholder

- 关思宇
- Born: May 19, 1994 (age 32); Harbin, Heilongjiang, China
- Education: Bachelor of Arts
- Occupation: Model
- Height: 1.79 m (5 ft 10 in)
- Beauty pageant titleholder
- Title: Miss China World 2017
- Hair colour: Black
- Eye color: Black
- Major competitions: Miss China World 2017 (Winner); Miss World 2017 (Top 40)

Guan Siyu (simplified Chinese: 关思宇; traditional Chinese: 關思宇; pinyin: Guān Sīyǔ; born May 19, 1994) is a Chinese model and beauty pageant titleholder who was crowned Miss China World 2017 and was a contestant for Miss World 2017 in China.

== Early life ==
She was born in Harbin, Heilongjiang, China. She also has a Bachelor of Arts.

== Career ==
=== Miss China World 2017 ===
Siyu was crowned Miss China World 2017 by outgoing titleholder Jing Kong, which qualified her to represent her country at Miss World 2017. She created a public welfare campaign called ‘Made by Mother’.

=== Miss World 2017 ===
She competed at the Miss World 2017 on November 18, 2017, in Sanya, China, and placed Top 40.

Awards and achievements
Preceded by Jing Kong	Miss China World; 2017	Succeeded by Mao Peirui
