= Prafulla Chandra Ghosh =

Indian politician (1891–1983)

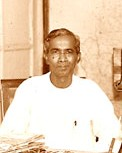
- Ghosh at Writers' Building in 1947

1st Premier of West Bengal
- In office 15 August 1947 – 22 January 1948
- Governor: Chakravarti Rajagopalachari
- Cabinet: Ghosh ministry
- Preceded by: office established (Huseyn Shaheed Suhrawardy as Prime Minister of Bengal)
- Succeeded by: Bidhan Chandra Roy

4th Chief Minister of West Bengal
- In office 21 November 1967 – 20 February 1968
- Governor: Dharma Vira
- Cabinet: Second Ghosh ministry
- Preceded by: Ajoy Kumar Mukherjee
- Succeeded by: president's rule (Ajoy Kumar Mukherjee as Chief Minister)

Member of West Bengal Legislative Assembly
- In office 1957–1962
- Preceded by: Kumar Deba Prosad Garga
- Succeeded by: Sushil Kumar Dhara
- Constituency: Mahisadal
- In office 1967–1968
- Preceded by: Mahendranath Mahato
- Succeeded by: Panchkari De
- Constituency: Jhargram

Personal details
- Born: 24 December 1891 Maliakanda, Bengal Presidency, British India
- Died: 18 December 1983 (aged 91) Calcutta, West Bengal, India
- Party: Independent (post-1967)
- Other political affiliations: PSP (1950–1967); INC (pre-1950)
- Relatives: Priyanka Yoshikawa (great-granddaughter)
- Education: University of Calcutta

Prafulla Chandra Ghosh (24 December 1891 – 18 December 1983) was the first Premier of West Bengal, India from 15 August 1947 to 14 August 1948. He also served as the Chief Minister of West Bengal in the "Progressive Democratic Alliance Front" government from 21 November 1967 to 20 February 1968.

== Early life ==
Prafulla Chandra Ghosh was born on 24 December 1891 at a remote village, Malikanda, in Dhaka district, British India (now Bangladesh) as a son of Purna Chandra Ghosh and Binodini Devi. Prafulla Ghosh was a brilliant student throughout his academic life and always stood first with scholarship. Prafulla had a rural upbringing and enjoyed cultural festivals such as Jatra, Kirtan, Padavali Gan, and also participated in agricultural activities. In 1920, he was awarded a doctorate in Chemistry by the University of Calcutta.

== Political life ==
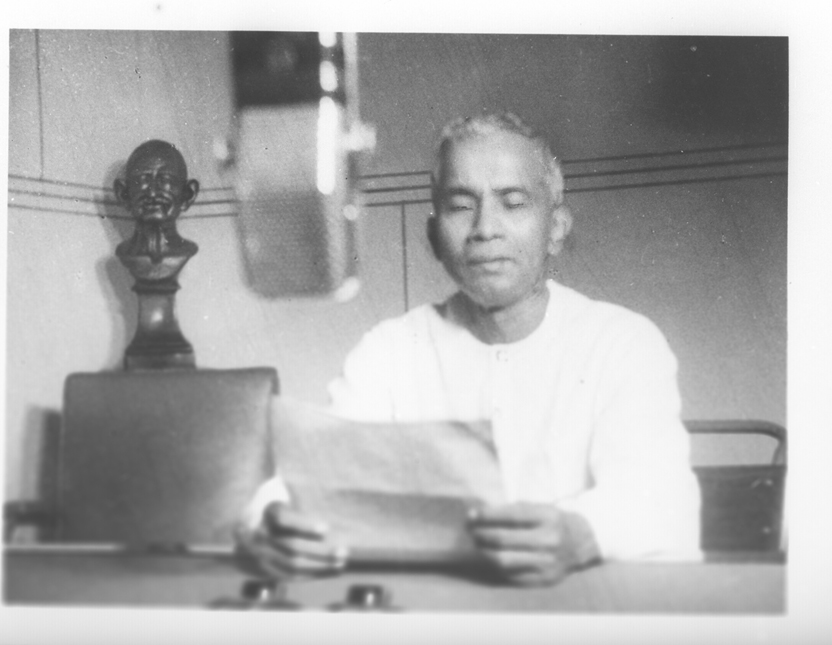
P. C. Ghosh, Member, Congress Working Committee and External Affairs-Premier, West Bengal broadcasting a talk on Indo-Pakistan Agreement from AIR. Calcutta on 26 July 1950.

Ghosh developed an interest in the Swadeshi Movement early on, but was most impressed and inspired by the ideas of armed revolution propagated by the Dhaka Anushilan Samiti, which he joined in 1909. However, the methods of the Samiti for raising money through theft and then defending the same in Court eventually alienated him, and he finally quit in 1913 to focus on academia. During the same time, while working for the Damodar flood relief, he met Surendranath Banerjee and other moderate leaders. Yogendra Nath Saha introduced him to the non-violent principles of Mahatma Gandhi. At the beginning, Gandhian principles did not impress him but he was moved by Gandhi's speech at Dhaka in December 1920 and soon afterwards met with him in Calcutta. In January 1921, he resigned from his position at the Calcutta Mint and along with other members of the Anami Sangh joined the Freedom Struggle.

== Family ==
His great-granddaughter is Priyanka Yoshikawa, who won the 2016 Miss World Japan contest, and his only grandson was Saumya Ghosh, Supreme Court and Inner Temple Bar-at-Law.

== Bibliography ==
- The theory of profits
- India as known to ancient and mediaeval Europe
- Mahatma Gandhi, as I saw him
- West today
- Jībana-smr̥tira bhūmikā
- Mahātmā Gāndhī
- Prācīna Bhāratīẏa sabhyatāra itihāsa

Political offices
Preceded by (new post)	Chief Minister of West Bengal; 15 August 1947 – 14 January 1948	Succeeded by B. C. Roy
Preceded by Ajoy Kumar Mukherjee	Chief Minister of West Bengal; 2 November 1967 – 20 February 1968	Succeeded by President's Rule
