= Gankhuyagiin Oyuungerel =

Mongolian beauty pageant titleholder

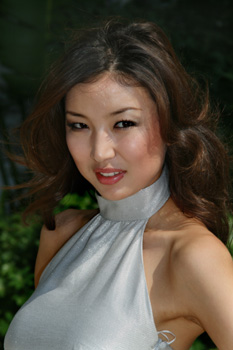
- Oyuungerel during Miss World 2007
- Born: Ганхуягийн Оюунгэрэл; 1985 (age 40–41); Ulaanbaatar, Mongolia
- Beauty pageant titleholder
- Title: Miss Mongolia 2007

Gankhuyagiin Oyuungerel (Mongolian: Ганхуягийн Оюунгэрэл; * 1985) is a Mongolian model and beauty pageant titleholder who was crowned Miss World Mongolia 2007 and represented Mongolia at Miss World 2007 in China. She studied at the Humanitarian University of Mongolia.

== See also ==
- Anun Chinbat
