= Miss Madagascar =

Beauty contest

Comité Miss Madagascar
- Formation: 1960
- Type: Beauty pageant
- Headquarters: Antananarivo
- Location: Madagascar
- Members: Miss World; Miss International
- Official language: Malagasy
- Organization: Comité Miss Madagascar
- Website: http://www.missmadagascar.org/

Miss Madagascar is a national Beauty pageant in Madagascar.

== History ==
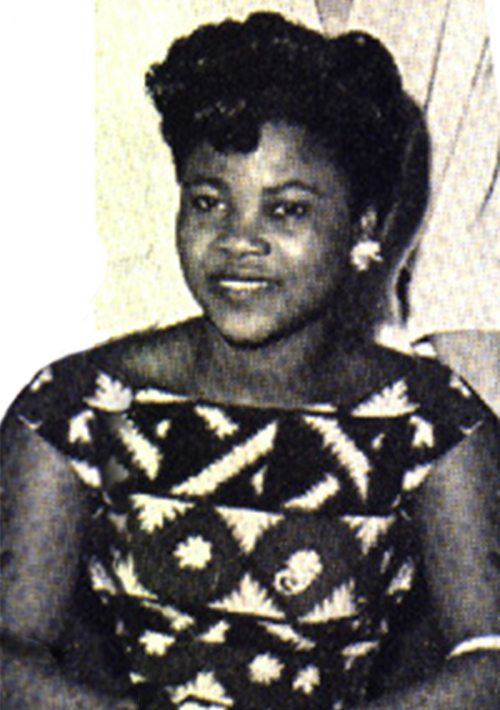
Rajaobelina Bedovoahangy, the first Miss Madagascar 1960. She competed in Miss World 1960.

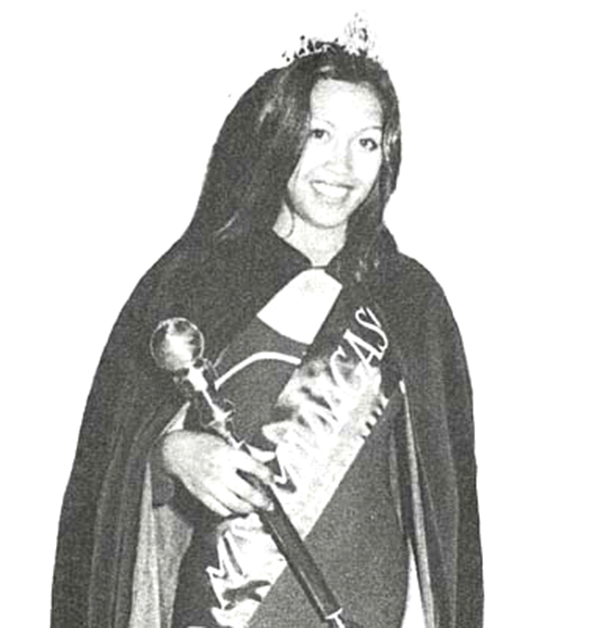
Raobelina Harisoa, Miss Madagascar 1974. She competed in Miss World 1974.

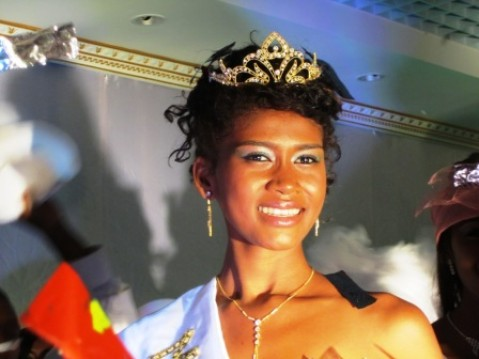
Tanzia Asmina, Miss Madagascar 2012

Miss Madagascar was founded in 1960 as part of the festivities of the country's independence from France. Rajaobelina Bedovoahangy became the first woman from Madagascar to participate in Miss World 1960. Ever since its inception, the organization of the national beauty contest has experienced several years of hiatus at different intervals. The winners of Miss Madagascar traditionally competed in Miss World. In 1998, Helen Hodgson, a Madagascar-based British businesswoman, took over the reins of Comite Miss Madagascar and brought the country back to Miss World. Today, Miss Madagascar is organized by Comite Miss Madagascar and TVM under the auspices of the Office of the First Lady of Madagascar.

== Titleholders ==
Year	Miss Madagascar	Region
1960	Rajaobelina Bedovoahangy	Antananarivo
1961	Jeanne Rakatomahanina	Antsiranana
1974	Raobelina Harisoa	Fianarantsoa
1990	Ellys Razan	Antananarivo
1999	Tantely Naina Ramonjy	Antananarivo
2000	Julianna Todimarina	Toamasina
2001	Tassiana Boba	Toliara
2002	Nirina Rasoamananarivo	Antananarivo
2012	Tanzia Asmina	Toliara
2015	Hanja Ranjalahy	Antsiranana
2016	Samantha Todivelou	Mahajanga
2017	Njara Windye Harris (Dethroned)	Antananarivo
2017	Felana Noelthina Tirindraza	Antananarivo
2018	Miantsa Valisoa Randriambelonoro	Fianarantsoa
2019	Valerie Binguira	Toamasina
2020	Due to the impact of COVID-19 pandemic, no pageant in 2020	
2021	Nellie Anjaratiana	Toamasina
2022	Antsaly Rajoelina	Analamanga

- Notes:
  - Complete list of the names of the winners of all editions of Miss Madagascar is not available.
  - Miss Madagascar is a registered trademark and the contest is not related to Miss RTA Madagascar or Miss Earth Madagascar.

== Big Four pageants representatives ==
=== Miss Universe Madagascar ===
- : Declared as Winner
- : Ended as runner-up or top 5/6 qualification
- : Ended as one of the finalists or semifinalists
- : Ended as special awards winner

Madagascar has competed in Miss Universe once in 1961.

Year	Hometown	Miss Universe Madagascar	Placement	Special Awards
Did not compete since 1962—Present
1961	Antananarivo	Jacqueline Robertson	Unplaced	

=== Miss World Madagascar ===
- : Declared as Winner
- : Ended as runner-up or top 5/6 qualification
- : Ended as one of the finalists or semifinalists
- : Ended as special awards winner

Madagascar has competed in Miss World since 1960. The Winner on Miss Madagascar national competition automatically will compete at the Miss World pageant, but not in 2002, 2012, 2015 and 2016 where the winner of Miss Madagascar did not compete in Miss World.

Year	Hometown	Miss World Madagascar	Placement	Special Awards
2025	Tsiroanomandidy	Cyria Temagnombe	Unplaced	
2024	No competition held			
2023	Analamanga	Antsaly Rajoelina	Top 40	
Due to the impact of COVID-19 pandemic, no pageant in 2022
2021	Antananarivo	Nellie Anjaratiana	Top 40	Beauty with a Purpose (Top 10)
Due to the impact of COVID-19 pandemic, no pageant in 2020
2019	Did not compete			
2018	Fianarantsoa	Miantsa Randriambelonoro	Unplaced	
2017	Antananarivo	Felana Noelthina Tirindraza	Unplaced	
Did not compete between 2002—2016
2001	Toliara	Tassiana Boba	Unplaced	
2000	Toamasina	Julianna Todimarina	Unplaced	
1999	Antananarivo	Tantely Naina Ramonjy	Unplaced	
Did not compete between 1991—1998
1990	Antananarivo	Ellys Raza	Unplaced	
Did not compete between 1975—1989
1974	Fianarantsoa	Raobelina Harisoa	Unplaced	
Did not compete between 1961—1973
1960	Antananarivo	Rajaobelina Bedovoahangy	Unplaced	

=== Miss International Madagascar ===
- : Declared as Winner
- : Ended as runner-up or top 5/6 qualification
- : Ended as one of the finalists or semifinalists
- : Ended as special awards winner

Madagascar has competed in Miss International since 1961. The Runner-up on Miss Madagascar national competition automatically will compete at the Miss International pageant, but not since 1962-2017. Where 2018 was the first time ever, Madagascar back after 57 years not competed in Miss International beauty pageant and marks their first placement in the Big Four international beauty pageants, with Esmeralda Rokotosan Lombardin Malleka, who's placed in the Top 10 at Miss International 2018 held in Tokyo - Japan.

Year	Hometown	Miss International Madagascar	Placement	Special Awards
Did not compete since 2023
2022	Ihorombe	Faratiana Randriamaro	Did not compete	
Due to the impact of COVID-19 pandemic, no pageant in 2020—2021
2019	Did not compete			
2018	Vohemar	Esmeralda Rokotosan Lombardin	Top 15	
Did not compete between 1962—2017
1961	Atsimo-Atsinanana	Ellysserre Ratahirisoa	Unplaced	
