= Miss Universe Mongolia =

Beauty pageant in Mongolia

Miss Universe Mongolia Organization
- Formation: 2018; 8 years ago
- Type: Beauty pageant
- Headquarters: Ulaanbaatar
- Location: Mongolia
- Members: Miss Universe
- Official language: Mongolian
- President / CEO: Ankhbayar Javkhlanbayar

Miss Universe Mongolia is a beauty competition annually held in Ulaanbaatar since 2018, main purpose is to select Mongolian representative for Miss Universe. The national franchise rights to organize the pageant in Mongolia are held by Ankhbayar Javkhlanbayar, a primetime news anchor at the Mongolian National Broadcaster. The winner of the 1st edition in 2018 was Dolgion Delgerjav. The winner of the 2nd edition in 2019 was Gunzaya Bat-Erdene. The winner of the third edition in 2023 was Nominzul Zandangiin.

== History ==
Mongolia has been organizing Miss Mongolia beauty pageant since 2001. In 2018 former Vice President of Miss Mongolia Anh Bayar became an official license holder of Miss Universe beauty pageant in Mongolia.

=== Broadcasters ===
- NTV (2018—present)

== Titleholders ==
| Year | Miss Universe Mongolia | First Runner-up | Second Runner-up | Entrants |
|---|---|---|---|---|
| 2018 | Dolgion Delgerjav | Battsetseg Turbat | Dolgoon Gerelul | 15 |
| 2019 | Gunzaya Bat-Erdene | Tugsuu Idersaikhan | Duurenjargal Gantsetseg | 13 |
| 2023 | Nominzul Zandangiin | Tungalag Natsagdorj | Namuunzul Batmagnai | 17 |

== International pageants ==
=== Miss Universe Mongolia ===
- : Declared as Winner
- : Ended as runner-up or top 5/6 qualification
- : Ended as one of the finalists or semifinalists
- : Ended as special awards winner

| Year | Province | Miss Universe Mongolia | Mongolian Name | Placement at Miss Universe | Special Awards | Notes |
Anh Bayar directorship — a franchise holder to Miss Universe Mongolia from 2018
| 2026 | Ulaanbaatar | Namuunaa Otgonbaatar | Намуунаа Отгонбатаар | TBA | | |
Did not compete in 2025
| 2024 | Ulaanbaatar | Nominzul Zandangiin | Номинзул Зандангийн | Unplaced | | Nominzul was the main winner of 2023, she allocated to Miss Universe 2024 after the organization decided to send her runner-up in 2023. |
| 2023 | Ulaanbaatar | Namuunzul Batmagnai | Намуунзул Батмагнай | Unplaced | | Appointed ― Batmagnai is a runner-up of Miss Universe Mongolia 2023. She was appointed by Miss Universe Mongolia Organization, after the main winner will have a year [re[aration to upcoming Miss Universe 2024. |
Due to the impact of COVID-19 pandemic, no representative between 2020—2022
| 2019 | Ulaanbaatar | Gunzaya Bat-Erdene | Гүнзаяа Бат-Эрдэнэ | Unplaced | | |
| 2018 | Ulaanbaatar | Dolgion Delgerjav | Долгион Дэлгэржав | Unplaced | | Pageant experiences: Miss Mongolia 2012, Miss World Peace 2012 (Top 20), World Supermodel Mongolia 2017. |
