= Miss Moldova =

Beauty pageant

Miss Moldova Organization Miss Universe Moldova Organization
- Formation: 1999
- Type: Beauty pageant
- Headquarters: Chișinău
- Location: Moldova
- Members: Miss Universe; Miss World; Miss International; Miss Earth
- Official language: Romanian
- National director: Ernest Hadrian Böhm (Miss Universe Moldova)
- Key people: Royal Group Corporation
- Website: missmoldova.md missuniversemoldova.md

Miss Moldova or also Miss Universe Moldova Organization is a national beauty pageant responsible for selecting Moldova's representative to the Miss Universe and Miss World pageant.

== History ==
The Miss Moldova pageant, established in 1999, is Moldova's premier national beauty competition. Its purpose is to select representatives for international pageants, primarily Miss World, with contestants evaluated across several categories including physical appearance, personality, communication skills, and social engagement. Over the years, Miss Moldova winners have also participated in other international competitions like Miss Earth and Miss International, reflecting the country's expanding presence in global beauty pageants.

=== Miss Universe Moldova Organization ===
In 2024, the Miss Universe Organization announced that Moldova would participate in Miss Universe for the first time under the directorship of Ernest Hadrian Böhm. A separate selection event was held in Moldova, where Djulieta Calalb from Chișinău emerged as the first titleholder.

== Titleholders ==
=== Miss Universe Moldova ===
- : Declared as Winner
- : Ended as runner-up or top 5/6 qualification
- : Ended as one of the finalists or semifinalists
- : Ended as special awards winner

Year	Adm. Division	Miss Moldova	Placement at Miss Universe	Special awards	Notes
Ernest Hadrian Böhm directorship — a franchise holder to Miss Universe from 2024
2026	Hîncești	Dorina Darii	TBA		
2025	Chișinău	Mariana Ignat	Unplaced		Formerly Miss Supranational Germany 2023 and Miss Charm Germany 2024
2024	Chișinău	Djulieta Calalb	Unplaced		

=== Miss World Moldova ===
- : Declared as Winner
- : Ended as runner-up or top 5/6 qualification
- : Ended as one of the finalists or semifinalists
- : Ended as special awards winner

Year	Adm. Division	Miss Moldova	Placement at Miss World	Special awards	Notes
Miss Moldova Org. directorship — a franchise holder to Miss World from 2000
2025	Chișinău	Anghelina Chitaica	Unplaced		
Miss World 2023 was rescheduled to 2024 due to the change of host and when entering India as the new host, there were several issues that caused the postponement until March 2024.
2023	Găgăuzia	Diana Spotarenko	Unplaced		
Miss World 2021 was rescheduled to 16 March 2022 due to the COVID-19 pandemic outbreak in Puerto Rico, no edition started in 2022.
2021	Chișinău	Tatiana Ovcinicova	Unplaced		
Due to the impact of COVID-19 pandemic, no competition held in 2020
2019	Left Bank of the Dniester	Elizaveta Kuznitova	Top 40	Miss World Sport (Top 32); Miss World Top Model (Top 40)	
2018	Chișinău	Tamara Zarețcaia	Unplaced	Miss World Sport (Top 24)	
2017	Chișinău	Ana Badaneu	Top 40	Head to Head Challenge (Winner)	
2016	Leova	Daniela Marin	Unplaced		
2015	Chișinău	Anastasia Iacub	Unplaced		
2014	Ungheni	Alexandra Caruntu	Unplaced		
2013	Left Bank of the Dniester	Valeriya Tsurkan	Unplaced	Miss World Beach Beauty (Top 11)	
Did not compete in 2012
2011	Chișinău	Veronica Popovici	Unplaced	Miss World Beach Beauty (Top 36)	
2010	Chișinău	Daria Zaiteva	Unplaced	Miss World Beach Beauty (Top 40)	
2009	Chișinău	Maria Bragaru	Unplaced	Miss World Dress Designer (Top 12)	
2008	Chișinău	Iana Varnacova	Unplaced		
2007	Chișinău	Ina Codreanu	Unplaced	Miss World Talent (Top 18)	
2006	Chișinău	Alexandra Demciuk	Unplaced		
2005	Chișinău	Irina Dolovova	Unplaced	Miss World Beach Beauty (1st Runner-up)	
2004	Chișinău	Marina Chivaciuc	Unplaced		
2003	Chișinău	Elena Danilciuc	Unplaced		
Did not compete between 2001 – 2002
2000	Chișinău	Mariana Moraru †	Unplaced		

=== Miss Earth Moldova ===
- : Declared as Winner
- : Ended as runner-up or top 5/6 qualification
- : Ended as one of the finalists or semifinalists
- : Ended as special awards winner

Year	Adm. Division	Miss Moldova	Placement at Miss Earth	Special awards	Notes
Miss Moldova Org. directorship — a franchise holder to Miss Earth from 2016
2025	Left Bank of the Dniester	Elizaveta Kuznitova	Top 25		
Did not compete since 2019–2024
2018	Chișinău	Dumitrița Izbișciuc	Unplaced		
2017	Chișinău	Veronica Buzovoi	Unplaced		
2016	Chișinău	Tatiana Ovcinicová	Unplaced	Best Eco-Beauty Video	
Another agency directorship — a franchise holder to Miss Earth in 2012
Did not compete between 2013–2015
2012	Chișinău	Aliona Chitoroaga	Unplaced		

=== Miss International Moldova ===
- : Declared as Winner
- : Ended as runner-up or top 5/6 qualification
- : Ended as one of the finalists or semifinalists
- : Ended as special awards winner

Year	Adm. Division	Miss Moldova	Placement at Miss International	Special awards	Notes
Miss Moldova Org. directorship — a franchise holder to Miss International from 2015
2024	Strășeni	Arina Mardari	Unplaced		
2023	Chișinău	Djulieta Calalb	Unplaced		
Did not compete between 2019―2022
2018	Leova	Daniela Marin	Unplaced		
2017	Chișinău	Daniela Bejan	Unplaced		
2016	Chișinău	Alina Chirciu	Unplaced	Miss Perfect Body	
2015	Chișinău	Anastasia Fotachi	Unplaced		
