= Priyanka Yoshikawa =

Japanese beauty pageant titleholder (born 1994)

- Born: Priyanka Ghosh; 20 January 1994 (age 32); Tokyo, Japan
- Height: 1.76 m (5 ft 9 1/2 in)
- Beauty pageant titleholder
- Title: Miss World Japan 2016
- Hair color: Black
- Eye color: Brown
- Major competitions: Miss World Japan 2016 (Winner); Miss World 2016 (Top 20)
- Relatives: Prafulla Chandra Ghosh (great-grandfather)

Priyanka Yoshikawa (吉川 プリアンカ, Yoshikawa Purianka; born Priyanka Ghosh; 20 January 1994) is a Japanese beauty pageant titleholder who was crowned Miss World Japan 2016. She is of mixed Japanese and Indian descent. Yoshikawa is the second mixed-race woman to win a major beauty pageant in Japan after Ariana Miyamoto, who won the Miss Universe Japan title in 2015.

== Miss World Japan 2016 ==
On 6 September 2016, Yoshikawa was crowned as Miss World Japan 2016 (Miss Japan 2016). She competed at Miss World 2016 pageant on December in United States and placed in the top 20.

== Personal life ==
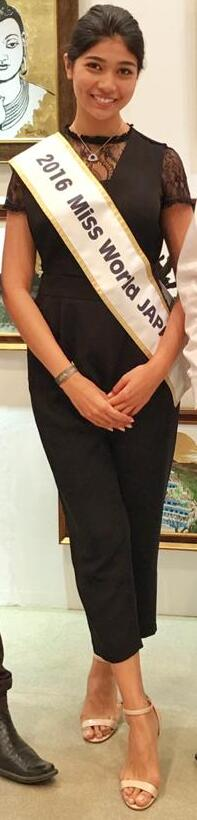

Yoshikawa's mother is Japanese and her father is Bengali Indian. Her great-grandfather Prafulla Chandra Ghosh was a politician and the first Chief Minister of the Indian state of West Bengal.

Yoshikawa was born in Tokyo. From ages 6 to 9, she lived in Sacramento, California. She also lived in Kolkata for one year before returning to Japan. She speaks fluent English, Bengali and Japanese. Before becoming Miss World Japan 2016, she worked as a translator and art therapist and also has a license to train elephants.

In 2020, Yoshikawa launched MUKOOMI, a CBD-based wellness and skincare line.

=== Discrimination ===
Speaking to AFP news, Yoshikawa recalled how she felt like a "germ" growing up in Japan due to her mixed-race heritage. She also stated that her experiences of discrimination were common among other half-Japanese individuals that she knew.

Following her win to represent Miss Japan in 2016, the BBC reported that she received some backlash from Japanese netizens who questioned how someone who isn't of "pure" Japanese ancestry could represent Japan. In response, Yoshikawa stated that while she had some confusion over her identity due to her half-Indian ancestry, she knows that she is "Japanese" and proud to represent her native country.

Awards and achievements
Preceded by Chika Nakagawa	Miss World Japan; 2016	Succeeded by Haruka Yamashita
