= Nicole Gaelebale =

- Born: April 22, 1993 (age 33); Mahalapye, Botswana
- Height: 1.83 m (6 ft 0 in)
- Beauty pageant titleholder
- Title: Miss Global Botswana 2012; Miss Earth Botswana 2014; Miss World Botswana 2017
- Eye color: Brown
- Major competitions: Miss Global Botswana 2012 (Winner); Miss Earth Botswana 2014 (Winner); Miss Earth 2014 (Unplaced); Miss World Botswana 2017 (Winner); Miss World 2017 (Top 40)

Nicole Lisa Gaelebale (born April 22, 1993) is a Botswana model and beauty pageant titleholder. She was crowned Miss Global Botswana 2012. She represented Botswana at Miss Earth 2014 where she was unplaced. In 2015, she won second place and was crowned First Princess of Botswana. She also won Miss World Botswana 2017 and represented Botswana at Miss World 2017.
