= Nomin Talst =

Mongolian boy band

Nomin talst
- Origin: Ulaanbaatar, Mongolia
- Genres: Pop, pop rock
- Years active: 1997–2024
- Members: Sükhee (1997–present); Khayanaa (1997–present); Deegii (1997–present); Khaazaa (1997–present)
- Past members: Erdenetögs; Erdenebayar

Nomin talst (Монгол: Номин талст) was a Mongolian boy band. The group's name is a combination of the names "Nomin" and "Talst". In 2000, they released their album, Gerel suuder, featuring the title track "Gerel süüder". Nomin talst performed a final concert at the "UB Palace" in Ulaanbaatar on 27, 28 November 2007.

== Members ==
=== D. Batsükh ===
D. Batsukh
- Born: D. Batsukh; 17 October 1977 (age 48); Ulaanbaatar, Mongolia
- Genres: Pop
- Occupation: Singer–songwriter
- Years active: 1995–present

Sukhee (born Batsükh /Монгол: Д. Батсүх/, 17 October 1977, Ulaanbaatar) is a Mongolian pop star, and a member of Nomin talst. He is a tenor.

After success with Nomin talst, the band decided in 2007 to move on to solo projects. Batsükh was the first, with his debut solo album, Khotiin khugjim, released in May 2007. In 2008, his second album was released.

In 2016, Batsükh was appointed as the Chief of Tourism for the city of Ulaanbaatar.

=== Amgalangyn Khayankhyarwaa ===
Amgalangyn Khayankhyarwaa
- Born: Amgalangyn Khayankhyarwaa; 20 August 1980 (age 45); Ulaanbaatar, Mongolia
- Genres: Pop
- Occupation: Singer–songwriter
- Years active: 1997–present

Khayanaa (born Amgalangyn Khayankhyarwaa /Монгол: Амгалангийн Хаянхярваа/, 20 August 1980, Ulaanbaatar) is a Mongolian pop star, and a member of Nomin talst. He is a tenor.

Khayanaa graduated from Ulaanbaatar's No.84 ten-year school in 1997. In 2000, he completed his Bachelor of Business Administration degree at the Institute of Finance and Economics.

In 2006, Khayanaa released a solo album titled Ankhnii zakhidal. He is currently studying for a Master's of Business Administration degree at the Academy of Management.

=== T. Delgermörön ===
T. Delgermörön
- Born: T.Delgermörön; 27 November 1979 (age 46); Ulaanbaatar, Mongolia
- Genres: Pop
- Occupation: Singer
- Years active: 1997–present

Deegii (born T. Delgermörön /Монгол: Т. Дэлгэрмөрөн/, 27 November 1979, Ulaanbaatar) is a Mongolian pop star, and a member of Nomin talst. He is a tenor.

He graduated from Ulaanbaatar's No.84 ten-year school in 1997.

He attempted a career as a solo artist in 2005, when he released Amin zurkh, his second solo album, in 2007. His third album Bi Mongol khun was released in 2010.

=== T. Khan-gerel ===
T. Khan-gerel
- Born: T.Khan-gerel; 17 April 1979 (age 46); Ulaanbaatar, Mongolia
- Genres: Pop
- Occupation: Singer
- Years active: 1997–present

Khaazaa (born T. Khan-gerel /Монгол: Т. Хан-гэрэл/, 17 April 1979, Ulaanbaatar) is a Mongolian pop star, and a member of Nomin talst. He is a baritone.

He graduated from Ulaanbaatar's No.5 ten-year school in 1997. In 2003, he completed his law school of General Intelligence Agency.

== Discography ==
- Gerel süüder /Гэрэл сүүдэр/ (2000)
- Eejdee /Ээждээ/ (2001)
- Tatakh khüch /Татах хүч/ (2002)
- Nemekh khasakh tseneg /Нэмэх хасах цэнэг/ (2003)
- Bidnii üye /Бидний үе/ (2005)
- Best of Nomin talst /Шилдгүүдээс шилэв/ (2006)
- 2014 (2014)

== Solo careers ==
=== T. Delgermurun ===
- Amin zürkh /Амин зүрх/ (2005)
- Nadad itge /Надад итгэ/ (2007)
- Bi Mongol khün /Би Монгол хүн/ (2010)

=== A. Khayankhyarwaa ===
- Ankhnii zakhidal /Анхны захидал/ (2007)

=== D. Batsükh ===
- Khotiin khügjim /Хотын хөгжим/ (2007)
- Ergen dursakh ayalguu /Эргэн дурсах аялгуу/ (2008)

== Awards ==
Pentatonic awards

- 1998, Best debut band
- 2000, Best album
- 1998, Best band
- 1998, Best song

Golden Microphone awards

- 2000, Best work

UBS Music Video Awards
