= Miss Mongolia =

Beauty pageant in Mongolia

Miss Mongolia Beauty Pageant Мисс Монголиа
- Formation: 2001
- Type: Beauty pageant
- Headquarters: Ulaanbaatar
- Location: Mongolia
- Members: Miss International
- Official language: Mongolian
- President: Sumiya Dashtseren (Miss Mongolia)
- Key people: Miss Mongolia Association
- Website: Official site

Miss Mongolia (Mongolian: Мисс Монголиа) is the beauty contest held in Mongolia to select Mongolia's representatives for Miss International. The first Miss Mongolia competition took place in 2001. Miss Mongolia pageant's official organizer is Desoft Media company. This pageant is unrelated to Miss World Mongolia and Miss Universe Mongolia.

== History ==
The Miss Mongolia Association is the oldest national competition in Mongolia. Its purposes are to promote Mongolian beauty and values, Mongolian young people, particularly young girls with education, communication, and to conduct activities aimed at improving the knowledge of beauty. The Association runs as a non-profit non-governmental organization. The committee has also arranged for the winners to compete at the Miss International and Miss Earth.

- Miss Mongolia 2014 is Yu Baljidmaa. She withdrew from Miss International 2014 and was replaced by her runner-up, Altangerel Bayartsetseg.

== Designations ==
On October 5, 2014, Altangerel Bayartsetseg was appointed as "Miss International Mongolia". The 2014 winner, Yu Baljidmaa did not compete in unknown reasons. Bayartsetseg is the second princess of 2014.

== Titleholders ==
Year	Miss Mongolia	
2001	Sansarmaa Luvsandoo	Miss International 2001 - Top 15
2002	—	No pageant held / No representative sent
2003	—	No pageant held / No representative sent
2004	Sodtuya Chadraabal	Miss International 2004 – Miss Photogenic
2005	Gantogoo Bayarkhuu	
2006	Bolortuya Dagva	
2007	Gerelchuluun Baatarchuluun	
2008	Ochgerel Khulangoo	
2009	Badamgerel Khurelbaatar	Academy-Andra model management Winner
2010	Badamtsetseg Batmunkh	Miss International 2010 – Miss Active nomination
2011	Tugsuu Idersaikhan	Miss International 2011 – 2nd Runner-Up
2012	Dolgion Delgerjav	
2013	Anu Namshir	Miss Tourism Queen International 2016
2014	Yu Baljidmaa	
2014	Bayartsetseg Altangerel	Miss International 2014
2015	Azzaya Tsogt-Ochir	Miss Asia 2018
2017	Saikhantamir Amarsanaa	
2018	Munkhchimeg Batjargal	Miss Earth 2023 – Best Appearance TOP-5
2019	Gunjidmaa Jargalsaikhan	
2020	—	No representative sent
2021	—	No representative sent
2022	Nomin-Erdene Bayarkhuu	
2023	Javkhlan Munguntsatsralt	
2024	Suvd-Erdene Bayaraa	Miss International 2024 – Top 20
2025	Bayarchimeg Tsegmid	

== Big Four pageants representatives ==
The following women have represented Mongolia in the Big Four international beauty pageants, the four major international beauty pageants for women. These are Miss World, Miss Universe, Miss International and Miss Earth.

=== Miss International Mongolia ===
- : Declared as Winner
- : Ended as runner-up or top 5/6 qualification
- : Ended as one of the finalists or semifinalists
- : Ended as special awards winner

Miss Mongolia has started to send a Miss Mongolia to Miss International from 2001. The winner represents Mongolia at Miss International. On occasion, when the winner does not qualify (due to age) for either contest, a runner-up is sent.

Year	Miss International Mongolia	Placement	Special awards	Notes
2026	Khuslen Shirendev	TBA		
2025	Tsegmid Bayarchimeg	Unplaced		
2024	Bayaraa Suvd-erdene	Top 20		
2023	Javkhlan Munguntsatsralt	Unplaced		
2022	Nomin-Erdene Bayarkhuu	Unplaced		
Due to the impact of COVID-19 pandemic, no pageant in 2020 and 2021
2019	Gunjidmaa Jargalsaikhan	Unplaced		
2018	Munkhchimeg Batjargal	Unplaced		
2017	Saikhantamir Amarsanaa	Unplaced		
2016	Did not compete			
2015	Azzaya Tsogt-Ochir	Unplaced		
2014	Altangerel Bayartsetseg	Unplaced		
2013	Anu Namshir	Unplaced		Miss Tourism Queen International 2016
2012	Dolgion Delgerjav	Unplaced		
2011	Tugsuu Idersaikhan	2nd Runner-up		Miss Earth 2014 (Top 8)
2010	Badamtsetseg Batmunkh	Unplaced	The Most Active award	
2009	Badamgerel Khurelbaatar	Unplaced		
2008	Ochgerel Khulangoo	Unplaced		
2007	Gerelchuluun Baatarchuluun	Unplaced		Miss Tourism Metropolitan International 2007 (Best National Costume)
2006	Bolortuya Dagva	Unplaced		
2005	Gantogoo Bayaarkhuu	Unplaced		
2004	Sodtuya Chadraabal	Top 15		
Did not compete between 2002—2003
2001	Sansarmaa Luvsandoo	Top 15		

== See also ==
- Miss Universe Mongolia
- Miss World Mongolia
