= Miss Cook Islands =

Beauty pageant

Miss Cook Islands Association; Maine Kuki Airani
- Formation: 1960; 66 years ago
- Headquarters: Avarua
- Location: Cook Islands
- Official language: English
- President: Dianna Clarke-Bates
- Affiliations: Miss World; Miss Earth; Miss International; Miss Grand International
- Website: www.misscookislands.com

The Miss Cook Islands is the national beauty pageant in the Cook Islands organised by the Miss Cook Islands Association (MCIA).

== History ==
=== Early ===
The pageant was held for the first time in 1960 and was usually held every two years. The pageant encompasses physical attributes and qualities that are seen to represent the community at large; respectability, talent and commitment to Cook Islands value.

=== International competitions ===
In 1998 the Miss Cook Islands franchised the Miss Universe and Miss South Pacific licenses. The pageant was patronized by Pa Te Ariki Upokotini Marie and Ui Ariki. Between 1983 and 1999 the Miss Cook Islands winners went to the Miss Universe competition.

Today, the pageant is patronised by the First Lady Akaiti Puna, the wife of Prime Minister Henry Puna.

The Miss Cook Islands association is a non-profit organisation that owns and operates the pageant, based on Rarotonga, the Cook Islands. It has evolved into a professionally operated pageant with a passion and focus on developing young Cook Islands women to be the best versions of themselves; and giving them opportunities to showcase their talent & skill on a world stage.

'Identity & Heritage' are the core themes of the pageant, as it strives to ignite cultural pride and self-worth in Cook Islands youth. The main sponsors of the pageant include the government of the Cook Islands and the largest companies in the islands. Every year the pageant sends its top three to Miss World, Miss International and Miss Grand International competitions. In 2018, the second runner up will represent the country at Miss Grand International. The first runner up will represent the country at Miss International. The winner will represent the country at Miss World. 2020 will see the return of the pageant to Miss Universe, in addition to Miss World and Miss Grand International 2020. Miss Cook Islands 2019 coronation is scheduled for Saturday 26 October 2019 at the National Auditorium at Rarotonga, Cook Islands.

== Titleholders ==
Year	Miss Cook Islands
1960	June Taringa (Baudinet)
1961	Tara Utanga (Scott)
1972	Joanna Taria Rere
1973	Ina Manuel Karika
1979	Ellena Tavioni
1980	Moari Luka-Fortes
1981	Celine Tommy
1982	Carmena Blake (Wong)
1983	Margaret Brown (Numanga)
1984	Essie Apolonia Mokotupu
1985	Lorna Sawtell
1986	Michelle Leone Oberg
1988	Annie Wigmore
1989	Angela Manarangi
1990	Raema Chitty
1991	Jeannine Tuavera (Piri)
1993	Leilani Brown
1994	Tarita Brown
1995	Victoria (Vicky) Keil
1998	Tina Marie Vogel
2000	Louisa Mayor Browne
2002	Donna Tuarra
2004	Noovai Tylor
2006	Krystina Te-Rangi Elizabeth Kauvai
2009	Engara Melanie Amanda Gosselin
2012	Teuira Napa
2014	Felicia Rose George
2015	Natalia Short
2016	Lydia Simonis Tariu
2017	Alanna Smith
2018	Reihana Koteka-Wiki
2019	Tajiya Eikura Sahay
2025	Tiarē Henry-Anguna

== International pageants representatives ==
- : Declared as winner
- : Ended as runner-up or top 5/6 qualification
- : Ended as one of the finalists or semifinalists
- : Ended as special awards winner

=== Miss World Cook Islands ===
Year	Miss World Cook Islands	Placement at Miss World	Special award(s)	Notes
2027	TBA	TBA	TBA	
2026	Tiare Henry-Anguna	Top 20	Miss World Oceania	
Did not compete between 2020–2025
2019	Tajiya Eikura Sahay	Top 12	Miss World Oceania	
2018	Reihanna Maire Koteka-Wiki	Top 30		
2017	Alanna Matamaru Matenga Smith	Unplaced		
2016	Natalia Asinata Simahite Short	Top 20	Miss World Sports	
Did not compete between 1991–2015
1990	Angela Manarang	Unplaced		
1989	Did not compete			
1988	Annie Wigmore	Unplaced		
1987	Michelle Leone Oberg	Unplaced		

=== Miss International Cook Islands ===
Year	Miss International Cook Islands	Placement at Miss International	Special award(s)	Notes
2025	Zoe Hoff	Unplaced	Miss Talent	
Did not compete between 2019–2024
2018	Louisa Purea	Unplaced		
2017	Silas Tuaputa	Unplaced		

=== Miss Grand Cook Islands ===
Miss Cook Islands acquired the license of Miss Grand Cook Islands in 2018, and the 2nd runner-up of that year's competition, Teau Moana McKenzie, was assigned to compete in the international tournament in Myanmar.

Year	Miss Grand Cook Islands	Placement at Miss Grand International	Special award(s)	Notes
2026	Matangaro Tarabay	Did not compete		Miss Cook Islands Grand International 2025 (Note: Supplemental title at the Miss Cook Islands 2025 pageant)
Did not compete between 2020–2025
2019	Pearl Lazaro	Did not compete		Miss Cook Islands 2019 2nd Runner-up
2018	Teau Moana McKenzie	Unplaced		Miss Cook Islands 2018 2nd Runner-up

== Past license holders ==
=== Miss Universe Cook Islands ===
Miss Cook Islands started to send a winner to Miss Universe from 1983—1999. On occasion, when the winner does not qualify (due to age) for either contest, a runner-up is sent.

Year	Miss Universe Cook Islands	Placement at Miss Universe	Special award(s)	Notes
Did not compete since 2000
1999	Tina Vogel	Unplaced		
Did not compete between 1997–1998
1996	Victoria Keil	Unplaced		
1995	Tarita Brown	Unplaced		
1994	Leilani Brown	Unplaced		
Did not compete in 1993
1992	Jeannine Tuavera	Unplaced		
1991	Raema Chitty	Unplaced		
Did not compete between 1987–1990
1986	Lorna Sawtell	Unplaced		
1985	Essie Apolonia Mokotupu	Unplaced		
1984	Margaret Brown	Unplaced		
1983	Carmena Blake	Unplaced		

=== Miss Earth Cook Islands ===
Year	Miss Earth Cook Islands	Placement at Miss Earth	Special award(s)	Notes
Did not compete since 2018
2026	Matangaro Tarabay	TBA		
2017	Mona Louisa Taio	Unplaced		
2016	Allanah Keri Herman-Edgar	Unplaced		
Did not compete between 2013–2015
2012	Teuira Raechel Napa	Unplaced		
