= Sambuugiin Serchmaa =

Mongolian singer

Serchmaa Sambuu
- Born: 14 August 1982 (age 44)
- Origin: Mongolia
- Genres: Pop, R&B, rock, folk
- Occupation: Singer
- Instruments: Vocal, violin
- Years active: present
- Label: Michid Records

Serchmaa Sambuu (Mongolian: Самбуугийн Сэрчмаа; Chinese: 斯日其玛), is a Mongolian singer. She was born on 14 August 1982 and graduated from the National University of Mongolia. When Serchmaa was 6 years old, she started playing the violin, then, she started a career in singing. Serchmaa performed in many countries such as China, South Korea, Japan, Russia, Poland, United States, Ireland, UK. One of the albums she recorded is called Tsagaan Süünii Domog.

== Personal life ==
There were rumors that Serchmaa was married, and later divorced. However, in an interview with the Mongolian newspaper “Ödriin Sonin” she denies the rumor entirely. Serchmaa is married to a businessman from Inner Mongolia.

== Life in China ==
She often performed in China, especially in Inner Mongolia. In 2008, she was invited to perform at the opening night of Guangxi Folk Song Festival in Nanning. From 2005 to 2009, every year she was invited to attend the festival of Zhaojun's opening night in Hohhot and Spring Festival Gala of Inner Mongolia Television and other theatrical performances. She once studied at Beijing Language and Culture University, learning Chinese language and studying Chinese culture courses. She also would sing some songs in Chinese. She held the wedding with her Chinese husband in Beijing Shangri-La Hotel on New Year's Day of 2010.

== Discography ==
=== CD ===
- Gantskhan chiniikh (2001)
- Sally-1 (2003)
- Sally-2 (2005)
- Hairaasaa asuuya (2007)
- Making me crazy (2008)
- Tsagaan Süünii Domog (2008)

=== DVD ===
- Süünii Ünertei Hangai (2010)
