= Goyol Fashion Festival =

Fashion event in Mongolia

Goyol (Mongolian: гоёл, decoration or adornment) is an annual fashion event held in Ulaanbaatar, Mongolia. It started in 1988 and the last 21st event took place on 13-15 of December 2008. Foreign designers and models participate in the show since 2000. The grand prix of Goyol-2007 was won by designer of Gobi company B. Nyamsuren, and model G. Tumenjargal was selected as the best model. At the Goyol-2008 event, the designs of 50 designers and 18 companies were featured by 15 male and 55 female models on the catwalk.

== Nominations of Goyol-2008 ==
- Best abstract design – B. Nomungerel
- Best ethnic design – Ts. Enhtuya
- Best daily wear design – O. Bold, Torgo saloon
- Best knitwear design – G. Baasandash, Lats company
- Best leather and fur design – Mönhsaihan & Möngönsor, Monstick company
- Best sewing design – Ts. Uyanga, Shilmel zagvar company
- Best fashion house – Mongoljingoo Institute
- Grand Prix – N. Solyolmaa, Goyo company
- Promising model – O. Purevdulam
- Photo model – J. Bayarmaa
- Second prize – B. Batceceg
- Best female model – M. Garvasuren
- Best male model – M. Bayarjargal
- Best top model – B. Alimaa
- Best top model - B. Dulamsuren

== Nominations of Goyol-2009 ==
Goyol-2009 was organised on the 12-13 December 2008. It featured collections of 50 designers demonstrated by 80 models with more than 500 fashion designs. In addition to the local designers, new collections were also presented by designers from France, the Russian Federation and Korea.

- Top model of the Festival - O. Uyanga
- Grand Prix - Alimaa, Evseg agency
- Best model of the year – E. Selenge
- Best fashion house – Shilmel zagvar agency
- Best male model - D. Samjmyatav
- Second prize - J. Munkhdalai
- Second prize - J. Munkhtsatsaral
- Special prize - S. Ariunbileg
- Photo model - O. Purevdulam

Designers:

- Best ethnic design - D. Unubolor, Shilmel Zagvar agency
- Best daily wear design – Ishdorj, University of Science and Technology
- Best fantasy design - Enkh-Och, City Institute
- Best sewing design – Undraa
- Best knitwear design – Soninjargal, Altai Cashmere LLC
- New material design - Ovdogmid, independent designer
- Special prize - Ganchimeg, City Institute
- Special prize - Ononbayar, Usleg Edlel Zagvar agency
- Special prize - Svetlana Bakyorova, Russian Federation

== Nominations of Goyol-2010 ==
Goyol-2010 took place on the 17-19 December 2009. Sixty models participated in the show .

- Top model of the Festival - Ch. Uranbileg
