= Microwave Journal =

Industry Technical Journal

Microwave Journal (abbreviated as MWJ), ISSN 0192-6225, is an American magazine. It was established in 1958 as an industry technical journal covering RF and microwave applications for practicing engineers and scientists. It is indexed and abstracted in the Science Citation Index The print magazine reaches 50,000 qualified readers monthly (print and digital distribution). The journal articles are reviewed for impact, relevance and accuracy by their editorial review board making them the only industry journal that is peer reviewed in this market. It had an impact factor of 0.35 in 2018 according to the Web of Science Journal list. It also publishes in Chinese bi-monthly reaching 10,000 readers in China. In 2017, a sister journal covering high speed digital applications was launched called Signal Integrity Journal. Both magazines are free to qualified subscribers and are advertiser supported.
