= Miss World Japan =

Beauty pageant

- Formation: 2013
- Type: Beauty pageant
- Headquarters: Tokyo
- Location: Japan
- Members: Miss World
- Official language: Japanese
- Website: www.missworld.jp

Miss World Japan (ミス・ワールド・ジャパン) is a national beauty pageant in Japan.

== History ==
The Miss World Japan contest was started in 2013, by national holder for Miss World in Tokyo, Japan. The winner of Miss World Japan (MWJ) represents her country at Miss World and, on occasion, when the winner does not qualify (due to age) for either contest, a runner-up is sent.

== Titleholders ==
Color keys

- : Declared as Winner
- : Ended as runner-up or Top 5/7 qualification
- : Ended as one of the finalists or semi-finalists
- : Ended as special awards winner

Year	Miss World Japan	Japanese	Represented	Placement	Special Awards
2027	TBA	TBA	TBA	TBA	
2026	Yui Kawana	友だちのユイ	Tokyo	Unplaced	
2025	Kiana Tomita	キアナ と見た	Tokyo	Unplaced	
2024	No competition held				
2023	Kana Yamaguchi	山口佳奈	Toyama	Unplaced	
2022	Due to the impact of COVID-19 pandemic, no pageant in 2022				
2021	Tamaki Hoshi	星 たまき	Akita	Unplaced	Miss World Talent (5th Place); Miss World Sport (Top 32)
2020	Due to the impact of COVID-19 pandemic, no pageant in 2020				
2019	Marika Sera	世良 マリカ	Kanagawa	Unplaced	Miss World Sport (Top 32); Miss World Talent (Top 27)
2018	Kanako Date	伊達 佳内子	Tokyo	Top 30	Miss World Top Model (Top 32); Beauty with a Purpose (Top 25)
2017	Haruka Yamashita	山下 晴加	Tokyo	Top 15	Miss World Talent (Top 20)
2016	Priyanka Yoshikawa	吉川 プリアンカ	Tokyo	Top 20	
2015	Chika Nakagawa	中川 知香	Niigata	Unplaced	Miss World Top Model (Top 30)
2014	Hikaru Kawai	河合 ひかる	Miyagi	Unplaced	People's Choice Award (Top 20)
2013	Michiko Tanaka	田中 道子	Shizuoka	Unplaced	Miss World Beach Beauty (Top 33)
2012	Nozomi Igarashi	五十嵐 希	Yamagata	Unplaced	
2011	Midori Tanaka	田中 緑	Okayama	Top 31	
2010	Hiroko Matsunaga	松永 博子	Fukuoka	Unplaced	
2009	Eruza Sasaki	佐々木 えるざ	Okinawa	Top 16	
2008	Mizuki Kubodera	久保寺 瑞紀	Kanagawa	Unplaced	
2007	Rui Watanabe	渡部 累	Tokyo	Unplaced	
2006	Kazuha Kondo	近藤 和葉	Tokyo	Unplaced	Miss World Sport (Top 24)
2005	Erina Shinohara	篠原 絵理奈	-	Unplaced	
2004	Minako Goto	後藤 美菜子	Akita	Unplaced	
2003	Kaoru Nishide	西出 薫	-	Unplaced	
2002	Yuko Nabeta	鍋田 裕子	-	Unplaced	
2001	Yuka Hamano	浜野 由佳	-	Unplaced	
2000	Mariko Sugai	菅井 万里子	-	Unplaced	
1999	Aya Mitsubori	三堀 彩	-	Unplaced	
1998	Rie Mochizuki	望月 里恵	-	Unplaced	
1997	Shinobu Saraie	更家 しのぶ	-	Unplaced	
1996	Miyuki Fujii	藤井 美由紀	-	Unplaced	
1995	Mari Kubo	久保 真理	-	Unplaced	
1994	Shinobu Sushida	須志田 しのぶ	-	Unplaced	
1993	Yoko Miyasaka	宮坂 謡子	-	Unplaced	
1992	Kaoru Kikuchi	菊池 薫	-	Unplaced	
1991	Junko Tsuda	津田 純子	-	Unplaced	
1990	Tomoko Iwasaki	岩崎 朋子	-	Unplaced	
1989	Kaori Muto	武藤 かをり	-	Unplaced	
1988	Kazumi Sakikubo	崎久保 和美	-	Unplaced	
1987	Keiko Unno	海野 圭子	-	Unplaced	
1986	Mutsumi Sugimura	杉村 睦	-	Unplaced	
1985	Haruko Sugimoto	杉本 治子	-	Unplaced	
1984	Ayako Ohsone	大曽根 文子	-	Unplaced	
1983	Mie Nakahara	中原 三枝	Yamanashi	Unplaced	
1982	Mutsuko Kikuchi	菊地 睦子	Tokyo	Unplaced	
1981	Naomi Kishi	岸 直実	Tokyo	Top 15	Queens of Asia
1980	Kanako Ito	伊藤 加奈子	Tokyo	Unplaced	
1979	Motomi Hibino	日比野 元美	Akita	Unplaced	
1978	Yuko Yamaguchi	山口 裕子	Okayama	Unplaced	
1977	Chizuru Shigemura	重村 千鶴	Saitama	Unplaced	
1976	Noriko Asakuno	朝久野 典子	Osaka	Unplaced	
1975	Chiharu Fujiwara	藤原 千春	Toyama	Unplaced	
1974	Chikako Shima	島 周子	Gifu	Top 7	
1973	Keiko Matsunaga	松永 恵子	Chiba	Unplaced	
1972	Akiko Kajitani		Kyoto	Unplaced	
1971	Emiko Ikeda	池田 恵美子	Tokyo	Unplaced	
1970	Hisayo Nakamura	中村 久代	Fukuoka	Unplaced	
1969	Emiko Karashima	辛島 恵美子	Shizuoka	Unplaced	
1968	Ryoko Miyoshi	三好 僚子	Tokyo	Unplaced	
1967	Chikako Sotoyama	外山 智香子	Tochigi	Unplaced	
1966	Harumi Kobayashi	小早志 春美	Kanagawa	Unplaced	
1965	Yuko Oguchi	小口 侑子	Aichi	Top 16	
1964	Yoshiko Nakatani		Ibaraki	Unplaced	
1963	Miyako Harada	原田 美弥子	Yamanashi	Unplaced	
1962	Teruko Ikeda	池田 照子	Hokkaido	4th Runner-up	
1961	Chie Murakami	村上 千恵	Nagano	Top 15	
1960	Eiko Murai	村井 睿子	Niigata	Top 15	
1959	Chieko Ichinose	一の瀬 千恵子	Tokyo	Unplaced	
1958	Hisako Okuse	奥瀬 寿子	Saitama	Unplaced	
1957	Muneko Yorifuji	依藤 宗子	Hyōgo	4th Runner-up	
1956	Midoriko Tokura	戸倉 緑子	Yamaguchi	3rd Runner-up	

== See also ==
- Miss Universe Japan
- Miss International Japan
- Miss Earth Japan
- Miss Japan
- Miss Nippon
