= Miss Cape Verde =

Beauty pageant

Miss Cape Verde Organization
- Type: Beauty pageant
- Location: Cape Verde
- Official language: Portuguese

Miss Cabo Verde, also rendered Miss Cape Verde, is a national beauty pageant in Cape Verde in which candidates representing the country's municipalities compete for the national title. The winner represents Cape Verde at international beauty competitions held under agreements with the organisation.

== Format ==
The national contest gathers candidates from across the archipelago, each representing a municipality. The 2022 edition, held on the island of Fogo, featured 18 candidates and was won by Juceila Pereira of Ribeira Grande, Santo Antão. The winner received cash and other prizes and the right to represent Cape Verde at Miss CEDEAO and other international contests.

== Titleholders ==
=== Miss Cape Verde ===
Year	Miss Cabo Verde
2022	Juceila Pereira
