= Ugochi Mitchel Ihezue =

Nigerian beauty queen

Mitchel Ugochi Ihezue is a Nigerian beauty queen. She was crowned as Most Beautiful Girl in Nigeria 2017, Miss World Top Model 2017, and Miss Universe Nigeria 2023. Mitchel was born on August 19, 1996, making her currently 29 years old as of 2025. Her birthdate places her under the Leo zodiac sign, often associated with confidence, creativity, and leadership qualities—traits that have been evident throughout her career in pageantry, modeling, and humanitarian work. Growing up during Nigeria's post-millennial era, she belongs to a generation of young Nigerians who have leveraged education, social media, and international exposure to make a mark both locally and globally.

== Early life and education ==
Mitchel is from Umukegwu-Akokwa in the Ideato-North Local Government Area of Imo State. She is a graduate of Fine and Applied Arts from University of Benin. In 2022, she completed her Master of Business Administration from Lagos Business School.

== Career ==
Mitchel represented Miss Kebbi and was crowned the winner of the Most Beautiful Girl in Nigeria 2017. She went on to be Miss World Top Model in 2017 and made top 15 at Miss World 2017.

In 2023, she was crowned Miss Universe Nigeria. She is the first woman to win both the Most Beautiful Girl in Nigeria and Miss Universe Nigeria pageants.

== Personal life ==
Mitchel married Nicholas Ukachukwu in 2023.
