= Miss World China =

Beauty pageant

- Formation: 1994
- Type: Beauty pageant
- Headquarters: Beijing
- Location: China
- Members: Miss World
- Official language: Chinese
- Company: Miss China World Organization
- Website: www.missworld.cn

Miss World China is a national pageant that sends representatives to Miss World Pageant. It is the first and oldest national beauty contest to be established in China.

== History ==
Miss China (simplified Chinese: 世界小姐中国赛区; traditional Chinese: 世界小姐中國賽區; pinyin: shìjiè xiǎojiě zhōngguó sàiqū) is the biggest national beauty pageant in Mainland China. It sends China representatives to Miss World Beauty Pageant since 2001.

== Titleholders ==
Color key

- Declared as Winner
- Ended as runner-up
- Ended as one of the finalists or semifinalists

Year	Province	Miss China	Placement	Special Awards
1994	Anhui	Pan Tao 潘涛	Unplaced	
2001	Jiangxi	Li Bing 李冰	Top 5	Miss World Asia & Oceania
2002	Hainan	Wu Yingna 吴英娜	Top 5	Miss World Asia & Oceania
2003	Jilin	Guan Qi 关琦	2nd Runner-Up	Miss World Asia & Oceania; Miss World Talent (Top 21)
2004	Chongqing	Yang Jin 杨金	Top 15	Miss World Talent (1st Runner-up); Miss World Top Model (Top 20)
2005	Shanxi	Zhao Tingting 赵婷婷	Unplaced	Miss World Talent (Top 16)
2006	Beijing	Liu Duo 刘多	Unplaced	Designer's Evening Wear (Top 20)
2007	Beijing	Zhang Zilin张梓琳	Miss World 2007	Miss World Asia & Oceania; Miss World Top Model; Miss World Beach Beauty (2nd Runner-up)
2008	Liaoning	Mei Yanling 梅妍凌	Unplaced	Miss World Top Model (Top 32)
2009	Anhui	Yu Sheng 余声	Unplaced	Designer's Evening Wear (Top 12)
2010	Liaoning	Tang Xiao 唐潇	Top 5	Miss World Asia & Oceania; Miss World Beach Beauty (3rd Runner-up); Miss World Top Model (Top 20)
2011	Heilongjiang	Liu Chen 刘晨	Unplaced	Miss World Talent (Top 11); Miss World Top Model (Top 20)
2012	Heilongjiang	Yu Wenxia于文霞	Miss World 2012	Miss World Talent; Miss World Beach Beauty (Top 10); Miss World Top Model (Top 10)
2013	Shaanxi	Yu Weiwei 余薇薇	Unplaced	Miss World Beach Beauty (Top 11)
2014	Beijing	Du Yang 杜暘	Top 25	Miss World Top Model (Top5)
2015	Anhui	Yuan Lu袁璐	Top 20	Miss World Top Model (Top 30)
2016	Henan	Jing Kong孔敬	Top 11	Miss World Top Model
2017	Heilongjiang	Guan Siyu关思宇	Top 40	Miss World Top Model (3rd Runner-up)
2018	Ningxia	Mao Peirui 毛培蕊	Top 30	Beauty with a Purpose (Top 25); Miss World Talent (1st Runner-up); Miss World Top Model (1st Runner-up); World Designer Awards; Sanya Tourism Promotional Video Award (1st Runner-up)
2019	Hebei	Peishan Li 李珮姗	Top 40	Miss World Talent (Top 27); Miss World Top Model (Top 40)
2020	Due to the impact of COVID-19 pandemic, no pageant in 2020			
2021	Liaoning	Jiang Siqi 姜思岐	Top 40	Beauty with a Purpose (Top 28)
2022	Hubei	Ruan Yue (Dethroned) 阮悅	Due to the impact of COVID-19 pandemic, no pageant in 2022	
2022	Shanghai	Qin Zewen (Assumed) 秦澤文	Due to the impact of COVID-19 pandemic, no pageant in 2022	
2023	Heilongjiang	Ke Xuxin 柯旭鑫	Unplaced	
2024	No competition held			
2025	Shandong	Liu Wanting 刘婉婷	Unplaced	
2026	Shandong	Yifei Dong 董逸飛	Top 20	World Designer Awards; Miss World Talent (Top 23); Miss World Top Model (Top 21)
2027	Guangdong	Ophelia Chuning He 何楚寧	TBA	TBA

== See also ==
- Miss Universe China
- Miss International China
- Miss Earth China
