= Crown of Beauty Theatre =

Theatre in Sanya, China

Coordinates: 18.256822°N 109.515528°E

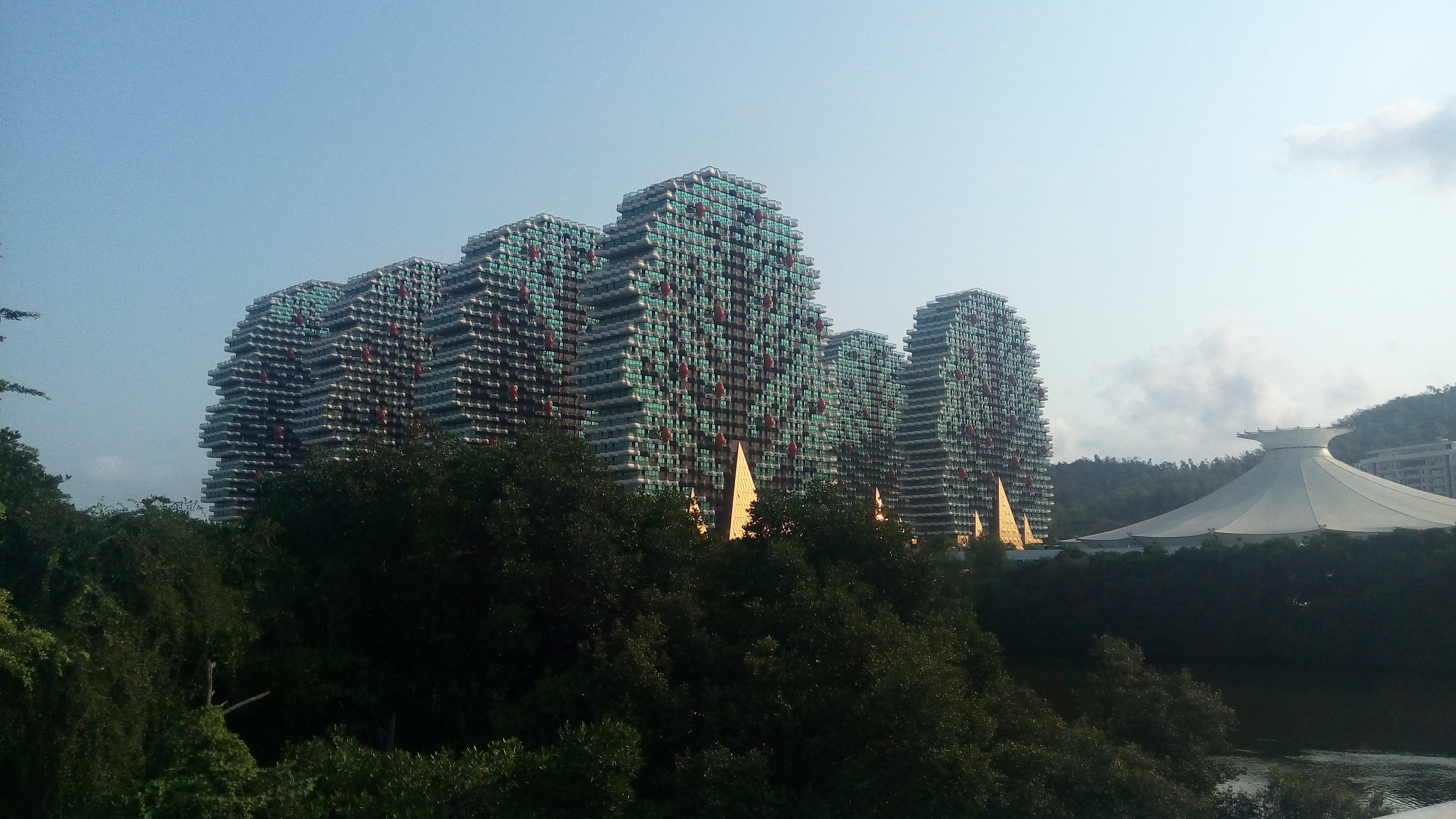
Crown of Beauty Theatre

Beauty Crown Grand Theater (Chinese: 美丽之冠大剧院) is an indoor arena or theater in seven-star Beauty Crown Hotel Complex in the tropical city of Sanya, Hainan Island, China, and it is currently one of the biggest arena or theater for arts and entertainment venues, which stands 36 meters high and covers about 10,000 square meters, and was built in 2003. Located in the city center, the crown-shaped Beauty Crown Theatre or Crown of Beauty Theatre was specially built for the Miss World pageant in 2003. The 3,500-seat theater is equipped with an up-to-date and high-tech audio and lightning system. It hosted 6 Miss World events: 2003, 2004, 2005, 2007, 2010, and 2015.

== Notes ==
- Beauty Crown Hotel Complex Website

Preceded by Alexandra Palace (United Kingdom) London (2002); Congress Hall (Poland) Warsaw (2006); Gallagher Convention Center (South Africa) Johannesburg (2009); ExCeL London (United Kingdom) London (2014)	Miss World venues 2003; 2004; 2005; 2007; 2010; 2015	Succeeded by Congress Hall (Poland) Warsaw (2006); Sandton Convention Center (South Africa) Johannesburg (2008); Earls Court Exhibition Centre (United Kingdom) London (2011); MGM National Harbor (United States) Maryland (2016)
