= Miss International 2019 =

59th Miss International pageant

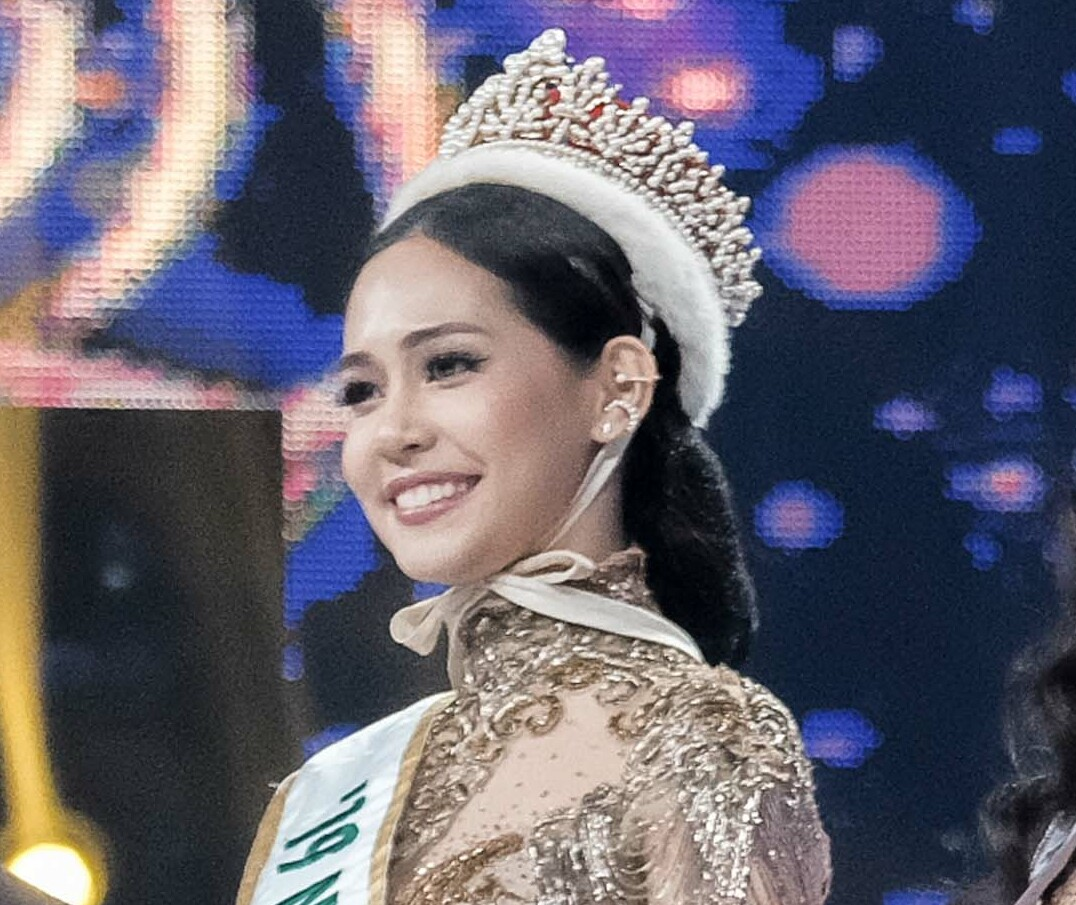
- Sireethorn Leearamwat, Miss International 2019
- Date: 12 November 2019
- Presenters: Tetsuya Bessho; Ayako Kisa; Kylie Verzosa
- Theme: Cheer All Women
- Venue: Tokyo Dome City Hall, Tokyo, Japan
- Broadcaster: Hikari TV; dTV Channel by NTT DoCoMo; YouTube; Indosiar
- Entrants: 82
- Placements: 15
- Debuts: Burkina Faso; Equatorial Guinea
- Withdrawals: Cook Islands; Cuba; Curaçao; Egypt; Ethiopia; Germany; Hungary; Kenya; Lebanon; Madagascar; Moldova; South Korea
- Returns: Armenia; Belarus; Belize; Cambodia; Cameroon; Italy; Liberia; Morocco; Nigeria; Norway; South Sudan; Tahiti; Tunisia; Uganda; Zambia
- Winner: Sireethorn Leearamwat; Thailand
- Best National Costume: Nguyễn Tường San; Vietnam
- Photogenic: Noémie Kribo Milne; Guadeloupe

Miss International 2019 was the 59th Miss International pageant, held on November 12, 2019, at Tokyo Dome City Hall in the Bunkyo district of Tokyo, Japan. Mariem Velazco of Venezuela crowned her successor, Sireethorn Leearamwat of Thailand, at the end of the event.

Contestants from 82 countries and territories participated in this year's Miss International pageant, surpassing the previous record of 77 contestants in 2018 and making this edition the largest turnout in the pageant's history.

The pageant was hosted by Tetsuya Bessho, marking his sixth consecutive year as host.

== Background ==
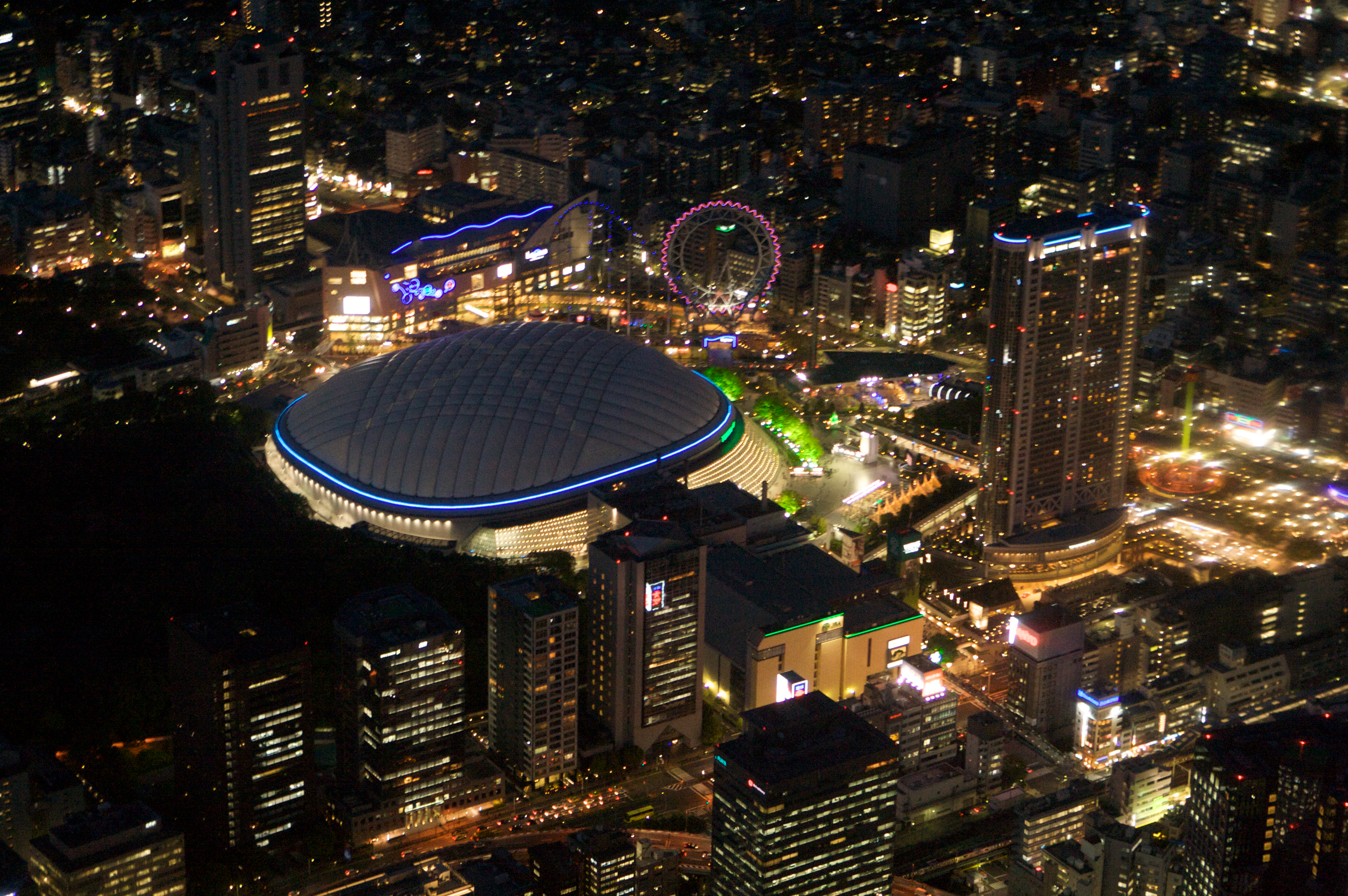
Tokyo Dome City Hall, the venue of Miss International 2019.

On April 11, 2019, the Miss International organization announced that the 2019 pageant would be held on November 12, 2019, in Tokyo Dome City Hall, Bunkyo, Tokyo, Japan, the competition's venue for the fourth consecutive year.

== Results ==
=== Placements ===
| Placement | Contestant |
|---|---|
| Miss International 2019 | Thailand – Sireethorn Leearamwat |
| 1st runner-up | Mexico – Andrea Toscano |
| 2nd runner-up | Uganda – Evelyn Karonde |
| 3rd runner-up | Colombia – Alejandra Vengoechea |
| 4th runner-up | United Kingdom – Harriotte Lane |
| Top 8 | Indonesia – Jolene Marie Rotinsulu; Philippines – Bea Patch Magtanong; Vietnam – Nguyễn Tường San |
| Top 15 | Belarus – Maria Perviy; Finland – Jutta Kyllönen; Hong Kong – Kaye Cheung; Netherlands – Elize Joanne de Hong; Puerto Rico – Ivana Carolina Irizarry; Sri Lanka – Pawani Vithanage; Venezuela – Melissa Jiménez |

=== Continental queens ===
| Continental Group | Contestant |
|---|---|
| Africa | Liberia – Naomi Nucia Glay |
| Americas | Peru – María José Barbis |
| Asia | Thailand – Sireethorn Leearamwat |
| Europe | Netherlands – Elize Joanne de Hong |
| Oceania | Hawaii – Eunice Raquel Basco |

=== Special awards ===
| Award | Contestant |
|---|---|
| Miss Photogenic | Guadeloupe – Noémie Kribo Milne |
| Miss People's Choice | Indonesia – Jolene Marie Rotinsulu |
| Best National Costume | Vietnam – Nguyễn Tường San |
| Best in Evening Gown | Venezuela – Melissa Jiménez |
| Best in Swimsuit | Uganda – Evelyn Karonde |
| Panasonic Beauty Ambassador | Indonesia – Jolene Marie Rotinsulu |
| Miss Visit Japan Tourism | Tunisia – Sarra Brahmi |

=== Top 15 ===
1. Venezuela
2. Thailand
3. United Kingdom
4. Hong Kong
5. Uganda
6. Netherlands
7. Vietnam
8. Finland
9. Puerto Rico
10. Belarus
11. Colombia
12. Philippines
13. Mexico
14. Sri Lanka
15. Indonesia

=== Top 8 ===
1. Mexico
2. Philippines
3. Colombia
4. Uganda
5. Indonesia
6. Vietnam
7. Thailand
8. United Kingdom

== Pageant ==
Following the same format as in the 2018 competition, contestants were classified under five continents: (1) Europe, (2) Oceania, (3) Africa, (4) Americas, and (5) Asia. Competition rounds consisted of national costume, swimwear, and evening gown. The contestants were trimmed to 15 semifinalists. After which, they were narrowed down to the top 8 finalists. The top 8 were then each given a chance to deliver their prepared final speech. The top 5 were then selected: Miss International 2019 and her four runners-up is the same format as in the 2017.

== Contestants ==
82 contestants competed for the title.

| Country/Territory | Contestant | Age | Hometown | Continental Group |
|---|---|---|---|---|
| Argentina | Milena Judt | 22 | Buenos Aires | Americas |
| Armenia | Sona Danielyan | 23 | Yerevan | Europe |
| Aruba | Daniella Piazzi | 25 | Oranjestad | Americas |
| Australia | Monique Shippen | 26 | Sydney | Oceania |
| Belarus | Maria Perviy | 22 | Minsk | Europe |
| Belgium | Rachel Nimegeers | 23 | Antwerp | Europe |
| Belize | Selena Maria Urias (Note: BELIZE — Selena Urias was appointed to represent Belize at the Miss International pageant, by Enrique De Leon, the national director of Miss Belize National Pageant.) | 24 | Belize City | Americas |
| Bolivia | Valentina Pérez Medina | 21 | Sucre | Americas |
| Brazil | Carolina Stankevicius Cruz | 24 | Rio de Janeiro | Americas |
| Burkina Faso | Wendlasida Flora Ouedraogo | 26 | Ouagadougou | Africa |
| Cambodia | Kachnak Thyda Bon | 25 | Phnom Penh | Asia |
| Cameroon | Angèle Kossinda (Note: CAMEROON — Angele Kossinda was appointed Miss International Cameroon 2019. She was Miss Earth Cameroon 2017 and Top 16 finalist at Miss Earth 2017. She soon became Miss Universe Cameroon 2020 and went to compete in Miss Universe 2020, but was unplaced.) | 26 | Douala | Africa |
| Canada | Megha Sandhu | 23 | Montreal | Americas |
| Chile | Ximena Huala Alcaino | 18 | Santiago | Americas |
| China | Teng Yun-Xuan | 26 | Beijing | Asia |
| Colombia | Alejandra Vengoechea (Note: COLOMBIA — Maria Vengoechea was appointed to represent Colombia at Miss International 2019, by Raimundo Aungulo the President of Miss Colombia Pageant. Vengoechea was 2nd runner-up in Miss Colombia 2019.) | 21 | Barranquilla | Americas |
| Costa Rica | Tamara Dal Maso (Note: COSTA RICA — Tamara Dal Maso was appointed to represent Costa Rica at Miss International 2019, by Reinas de Costa Rica Organization.) | 21 | San José | Americas |
| (Ivory Coast) Côte d'Ivoire | Tara Gueye | 22 | Abidjan | Africa |
| Czech Republic | Andrea Prchalová | 19 | Havlíčkův Brod | Europe |
| Denmark | Anna Diekelmann | 26 | Frederiksberg | Europe |
| Dominican Republic | Zaidy Bello | 27 | Santo Domingo | Americas |
| Ecuador | Alegría Tobar Cordovéz | 25 | Quito | Americas |
| El Salvador | Elena Batlle (Note: EL SALVADOR — Elena Batlle was appointed as Miss International El Salvador 2019 after Francisco Cortez became the new national director of Miss International El Salvador.) | 25 | San Salvador | Americas |
| Equatorial Guinea | Arsenia Chanque Bosepe | 19 | Baney | Africa |
| Finland | Jutta Kyllönen | 21 | Oulu | Europe |
| France | Solène Barbot | 24 | Paris | Europe |
| Ghana | Princess Owusua Gyamfi | 25 | Accra | Africa |
| Guadeloupe | Noémie Kribo Milne | 21 | Baie-Mahault | Americas |
| Guam | Athena McNinch (Note: GUAM — Kirsten Lydia Dahilig, Miss International Guam 2019, was replaced by Athena McNinch by Joyce Bamba, the license holder for Miss International of Miss Guam after Lydia did not meet the minimum age requirements for the Miss International pageant. McNinch was crowned as Miss Guam 2018 and later competed at Miss Universe 2018, but was unplaced.) | 22 | Mangilao | Oceania |
| Guatemala | Stephanie Sical | 24 | Quiché | Americas |
| Haiti | Lory-Anne Charles | 20 | Port-au-Prince | Americas |
| Hawaii | Eunice Raquel Basco | 24 | Honolulu | Oceania |
| Honduras | Ariana Bustillo | 27 | Tegucigalpa | Americas |
| Hong Kong | Kaye Cheung | 25 | Kowloon | Asia |
| India | Simrithi Bathija | 20 | Mumbai | Asia |
| Indonesia | Jolene Marie Rotinsulu | 23 | Manado | Asia |
| Italy | Francesca Giordano | 18 | Rome | Europe |
| Japan | Tomomi Okada | 22 | Tokyo | Asia |
| Laos | Phaithida Phothisane | 26 | Vientiane | Asia |
| Liberia | Naomi Nucia Glay | 27 | Monrovia | Africa |
| Macau | Bobo Leong Lok Hei | 26 | Macau | Asia |
| Malaysia | Charmaine Chew (Note: MALAYSIA — Charmaine Chew Qi En was appointed by Miss International Malaysia Organization, the official new license holder of Miss International in Malaysia. Chew placed as the Top 10 finalist at Miss Universe Malaysia 2018.) | 23 | Alor Setar | Asia |
| Mauritius | Nidhishwaree Ruchpaul | 20 | Pamplemousses | Africa |
| Mexico | Andrea Toscano (Note: MEXICO – Andrea Toscano was appointed as Miss International Mexico 2019, by Lupita Jones the President of Mexicana Universal pageant. Toscano represented Mexico in Miss Universe 2018, but was unplaced.) | 20 | Manzanillo | Americas |
| Mongolia | Gunjidmaa Jargalsaikhan | 25 | Ulaanbaatar | Asia |
| Morocco | Sonia Ait Mansour | 26 | Rabat | Africa |
| Myanmar | Khin Ohmar Myint | 23 | Yangon | Asia |
| Nepal | Meera Kakshapati | 24 | Bhaktapur | Asia |
| Netherlands | Elize Joanne de Hong | 25 | Rotterdam | Europe |
| New Zealand | Nikita Ah Horan | 18 | Auckland | Oceania |
| Nicaragua | María Gabriela Saballos | 19 | Managua | Americas |
| Nigeria | Alice Duke Inyang (Note: NIGERIA — Alice Duke Inyang was appointed to represent Nigeria at the Miss International pageant, by Daniel Opuene, the national director of Beauty of African International Pageant.) | 23 | Lagos | Africa |
| Northern Mariana Islands | Shannon Tudela Sasamoto | 20 | Saipan | Oceania |
| Norway | Henriette Janssen Hauge | 19 | Akershus | Europe |
| Panama | Betzaida Rodriguez | 23 | Las Tablas | Americas |
| Paraguay | Elida Lezcano | 19 | Villa Elisa | Americas |
| Peru | María José Barbis | 23 | Chiclayo | Americas |
| Philippines | Bea Magtanong | 25 | Bataan | Asia |
| Poland | Karina Szczepanek | 24 | Warsaw | Europe |
| Portugal | Ana Rita Aguiar | 22 | Vale de Cambra | Europe |
| Puerto Rico | Ivana Carolina Irizarry | 26 | Río Grande | Americas |
| Romania | Andreea Maria Coman | 26 | Bucharest | Europe |
| Russia | Marina Oreshkina | 25 | Vladivostok | Asia |
| Singapore | Charlotte Lucille Chia | 21 | Singapore | Asia |
| Slovakia | Alica Ondrášová | 23 | Bratislava | Europe |
| South Africa | Nicole Middleton | 24 | Pretoria | Africa |
| South Sudan | Acholly Ngaceng Arow | 25 | Juba | Africa |
| Spain | Claudia Cruz | 21 | Murcia | Europe |
| Sri Lanka | Pawani Vithanage | 24 | Colombo | Asia |
| Sweden | Paulina Kielczewska | 23 | Stockholm | Europe |
| (French Polynesia) Tahiti | Poevai Garnier | 22 | Pape'ete | Oceania |
| Taiwan | Joyce Yi Shu-Chiu | 26 | Tainan | Asia |
| Thailand | Sireethorn Leearamwat | 25 | Bangkok | Asia |
| Tunisia | Sarra Brahmi | 25 | Sousse | Africa |
| Uganda | Evelyn Namatovu Karonde | 23 | Kampala | Africa |
| Ukraine | Marina Kiose | 24 | Odesa | Europe |
| United Kingdom | Harriotte Lane | 18 | Newcastle | Europe |
| United States | Ghazal Gill | 23 | Los Angeles | Americas |
| Venezuela | Melissa Jiménez | 20 | Maracaibo | Americas |
| Vietnam | Nguyễn Tường San | 19 | Hanoi | Asia |
| Zambia | Luwi Kawanda (Note: ZAMBIA — Miss Grand Zambia 2019 was appointed as Miss International Zambia 2019 due to the unstable political situation in Venezuela which is the host country of Miss Grand International 2019. Luwi was second runner-up at Miss Universe Zambia 2017.) | 25 | Lusaka | Africa |
| Zimbabwe | Jemimah Kandemiiri | 24 | Harare | Africa |

== Notes ==
=== Debuts ===
- Burkina Faso
- Equatorial Guinea

=== Returns ===
Last competed in 1969:

- Morocco

Last competed in 2008:

- Liberia

Last competed in 2009:

- Uganda

Last competed in 2012:

- Belize
- Cameroon

Last competed in 2013:

- South Sudan
- Tahiti

Last competed in 2014:

- Armenia

Last competed in 2015:

- Italy

Last competed in 2016:

- Nigeria
- Zambia

Last competed in 2017:

- Belarus
- Cambodia
- Norway
- Tunisia

=== Withdrawals ===
- Cook Islands – No contest, will not send their representative to the competition this year.
- Cuba
- Curaçao – No contest, due to lack of sponsorship.
- Egypt – No contest, due to lack of sponsorship.
- Ethiopia – No contest, due to lack of sponsorship.
- Germany - Germany's delegate, Annabella Fleck, was in Japan with the rest of the contestants but withdrew before the competition for undisclosed reasons.
- Hungary – No contest.
- Kenya – No contest, due to lack of sponsorship.
- Lebanon
- Madagascar
- Moldova – No contest, due to lack of sponsorship.
- South Korea – Did not compete this year.
