= Miss International Puerto Rico =

Organization

- Formation: 1960
- Type: Beauty pageant
- Headquarters: San Juan
- Location: Puerto Rico
- Members: Miss International
- Official language: Spanish
- President: Joe Amhed

Miss International Puerto Rico (previously called Miss Puerto Rico) is a national beauty pageant in Puerto Rico.

== History ==
The first Puerto Rican delegate in Miss International was Carmen Sara Látimer, sent in 1960. Since 1960, Puerto Rico has produced two winners (Laurie Simpson in 1987 and Valerie Hernandez in 2014), one 3rd runner-up and ten semi-finalists. The Miss Puerto Rico pageant had the Miss International franchise from 1960 to 1997, after a two-year hiatus, a new pageant was created called Miss Puerto Rico Turismo that sent representatives until 2007 when a new organization acquired the franchise (Creative Options Inc. – Fernando Oquendo Vega). From 2016 to 2025, Nuestra Belleza Puerto Rico owned the Miss International franchise under the directorship of Miguel Deliz. Since 2026, Miss International Puerto Rico is owned by Joe Amhed.

== Representatives ==
The Miss International pageant began in 1960 and since then Puerto Rico has had 15 representatives classify in the finals including: 2 winners, 1 runner-up and 12 semi-finalists.

Color key

- Declared as Winner
- Ended as runner-up
- Ended as one of the finalists or semifinalists

The winner of Miss International Puerto Rico represents her country at the Miss International. On occasion, when the winner does not qualify (due to age) for either contest, a runner-up is sent.

Year	Miss International Puerto Rico	Placement	Special Awards
2026	Paola Michelle Martínez Otero	TBA	
2025	Zamira Lee Allende González		
2024	Zahira Marie Pérez Gerena		
2023	Amanda Paola Pérez Solís	Top 15	
2022	Paola Gonzalez Torres		
Due to the impact of COVID-19 pandemic, no competition held between 2020—2021
2019	Ivana Carolina Irizarry Fritany	Top 15	
2018	Yarelis Yvette Salgado Rodríguez		
2017	Beverly Marie Rodríguez de León	Did not compete	
2016	Gabriela Berríos Pagán		
2015	Wilmary Monción Román		
2014	Valerie Hernández Matías	Miss International 2014	
2013	Ashley Beth Pérez Calderón	Top 15	
2012	Ashley Michelle Ruiz Rodríguez		
2011	Desiree Del Rio De Jesús	3rd Runner-up	Miss Active
2010	Aideliz Hidalgo Betances	Top 15	
2009	Mónica Cristina Pastrana González		
2008	Miriam Pabón Carrión	Top 12	
2007	Haydil Rivera Escobales	Top 15	
2006	Sharon Haydée Gómez Díaz	Top 12	
2005	Dinorah Collazo		
2004	Meredith Herrera Morales		
2003	Dignelis Taymí Jiménez Hernández		
2002	Mariela Lugo Marín		
2001	Lorena Otero Pérez		
2000	Rosiveliz Diaz Rodriguez		
1998	Jacqueline Negrón	Did not compete	
1997	Ymak Farah Fagundo Soto	Top 15	
1996	Lydia Guzmán López		
1995	Maria Del Rocío Arroyo Rivera		
1994	Alice Marina Lee		
1993	Brenda Esther Robles Cortés		
1992	Dayanara Torres Delgado	Top 15	
1991	Lizaura Quiñones Torres		
1990	Ana Rosa Brito Suárez		
1989	Michele Cotto		
1988	Yolanda Martínez		
1987	Laurie Tamara Simpson Rivera	Miss International 1987	
1986	Elizabeth Robison Latalladi	Top 15	
1984	Sandra Beauchamp Roche	Did not compete	
1977	Marta Hernández		Miss Photogenic
1976	Yvonne Torres García	Top 15	
1975	Gladys Salgado Castillo		
1972	Miriam López		Miss Congeniality
1971	Doris L. Morales		
1968	Elsa Maria Schroeder Méndez		
1967	Maria Felisa Seda		
1965	Iraida Palacios		
1964	Zoé Sandra Foy Santiago		
1963	Aida Mercado Cordero	Top 15	
1962	Agnes Toro Garratón		
1961	Ivette Monagas		
1960	Carmen Sara Látimer		
