= Señorita Aruba =

Beauty pageant in Aruba

Srta Aruba Miss Aruba
- Formation: 2012
- Type: Beauty pageant
- Headquarters: Oranjestad
- Location: Aruba
- Members: Miss International; Miss Earth
- Official language: Dutch and English
- Foundation: Miss Aruba Foundation
- Website: Srta-Aruba

Señorita Aruba is the national Beauty pageant in Aruba. The three brands; Miss Teen Aruba, Miss Aruba and Srta. Aruba are registered and are under management of Miss Aruba Foundation

== History ==
A TV Personality and Producer, Isaï Labadie introduced the Miss Aruba Foundation which held the Srta. Aruba, Miss Aruba and Miss Teen Aruba. The foundation is unrelated to Star Promotion Foundation (Miss Universe Aruba)

=== Purpose ===
The purpose is to prepare all the candidates, regardless of social standards, at the same level. They are the only pageant on the island that works to minimize the costs of participating by helping the candidate in various ways. This is effort is made possible by their partners.

The winner will represent Aruba at the MISS INTERNATIONAL Pageant in Japan, MISS WORLD and MISS EARTH.

Chamber of Commerce : 1266

== Titleholders ==
Year	Señorita Aruba
2013	Erialda Croes
2014	Francis Massiel Sousa
2015	Laura Luiz
2016	Tania Nunes
2018	Anouk Eman
2019	Daniella Piazzi
2020	TBA

== International pageants ==
MISS ARUBA FOUNDATION The winners will represent Aruba at the Miss International Miss World and Miss Earth pageants. Before 2011, traditionally the 2nd Runner-up of Star Promotion Foundation Miss Aruba will represent her country at the Miss International pageant. In 2011, Aruba made a debut at Miss Earth. The Star Promotion Foundation sends a delegate to represent Aruba at Miss Earth. In 2011, Mellisa Lacle was appointed to compete at the pageant, she was Miss Aruba 2005 who competed at Miss Universe 2006 in Nevada, USA.

=== Miss Aruba International ===
Color key

- Declared as Winner
- Ended as runner-up
- Ended as one of the finalists or semifinalists

Year	Miss Aruba International	Placement at Miss International
1994	Alexandra Ochoa Hincapié	1st Runner-up
1995	Yolanda Janssen	Unplaced
1996	Julisa Marie Lampe	Unplaced
1997	Louisette Mariela Vlinder	Unplaced
1998	Anushka Sheritsa Lew Jen Tai	Unplaced
1999	Cindy Vanessa Cam Lin Martinus	Unplaced
2000	Carolina Francisca Albertsz	Best National Costume
2001	Daphne Dione Croes	Top 15
2002	Jerianne Tiel	Unplaced
2003	Falon Juliana Lopez	Unplaced
2004	Ysaura Giel	Unplaced
2005	Gita van Bochove	Unplaced
2006	Luizanne "Zenny" Donata	Unplaced
2007	Jonella Oduber	Best National Costume
2008	Nuraisa Lispier	Best National Costume
2009	Christina Trejo	Unplaced
2010	Ivana Werleman	Unplaced
2011	Vivian Chow	Goodwill Ambassador
2013	Erialda Croes	Best National Costume & Goodwill Ambassador
2014	Francis Massiel Sousa	Unplaced
2015	Laura Luiz	Miss International Americas
2016	Tania Nunes	Unplaced
2018	Anouk Eman	Unplaced
2019	Daniella Piazzi	Unplaced
2020	Due to the impact of COVID-19 pandemic, no pageant in 2020	
2021	Yeka Medina Suárez	Unplaced

=== Miss Aruba Earth ===
Color key

- Declared as Winner
- Ended as runner-up
- Ended as one of the finalists or semifinalists

Year	Miss Aruba Earth	Placement at Miss Earth	Special awards
2011	Melissa Laclé	Unplaced	
2015	Kimberly Wever	Unplaced	(bronze) Miss Friendship (Group 1)
2017	Tania Nunes	Did not compete	
