= Miss International Myanmar =

- မယ်အပြည်ပြည်ဆိုင်ရာ မြန်မာ
- Formation: 2013; 13 years ago
- Type: Beauty pageant
- Headquarters: Yangon
- Location: Myanmar
- Official language: Burmese
- National Director: Htoo Ant Lwin
- Parent organization: Mingalarpar Miss Myanmar

Miss International Myanmar or previously known as Miss Myanmar International is an annual national beauty pageant that selects Myanmar's representative to the annual Miss International contest.

The reigning Miss International Myanmar is Nan Inzali.

== History ==
Began in 2012, Myanmar has participated for the first time since 1961 in an international beauty pageant, with Nang Khin Zay Yar being the representative at the Miss International 2012 competition.

== Titleholders ==
Year	Miss International Myanmar	Runners up				Final venue	Host city	Entrants
Year	Miss International Myanmar	First	Second	Third	Fourth	Final venue	Host city	Entrants
2012	Nang Khin Zay Yar (Shan State) Taunggyi	Swan Yee Htun; Yangon	Aye Chan Moe; Yangon	Not awarded	Not awarded	Myanmar Convention Center	Yangon	20
2013	Gonyi Aye Kyaw; Mandalay	Zun Than Sin; Yangon	Sweety Ko; Yangon	Not awarded	Not awarded	Mayangon Township	Yangon	20
2014	Khin Wai Phyo Han (Dethroned); Yangon	May Barani Thaw (Assumed); Yangon	Thadar Mariah; Yangon	Not awarded	Not awarded	National Theatre of Yangon	Yangon	20
2015	Emerald Nyein; Yangon	Thada Maria; Yangon	Kong Nan; Yangon	Not awarded	Not awarded	National Theatre of Yangon	Yangon	20
2016	Inngyin Htoo; Mandalay	Tin Sandar Myo; Yangon	Nay Kyar Khin; Yangon	Not awarded	Not awarded	National Theatre of Yangon	Yangon	20
2017	Sao Yoon Wadi Oo (Shan State) Taunggyi	Htun Palal Yadanar; Yangon	Ei Kay Zin Thann; Yangon	Not awarded	Not awarded	Novotel Yangon Max	Yangon	20
2018	May Yu Khatar; Yangon	Poe Aeint Zin; Yangon	Nay Chit Htun; Yangon	Po Po Htun; Yangon	Thel Thel Su Nyein; Sagaing	Novotel Yangon Max	Yangon	20
2019	Khin Ohmar Myint (Shan State) Taunggyi	Myo Thiri Ko; Yangon	Ya Mone Winn; Yangon	Elena Win; Yangon	Win Lei Mon; Yangon	Novotel Yangon Max	Yangon	20
2020-2021 (No pageant held due to Covid 19 pandemic)
2022	Withdrew							
2023	Ei Ei Myint Aung Thein		Appointed					
2024	Kendra Erika		Appointed					
2025	Nan inzali		Appointed					

=== Winners by City/Town ===
City/Town	Titles	Winning years
Yangon	4	1961, 2014*, 2015, 2018
(Shan State) Taunggyi	3	2012, 2017, 2019
Mandalay	2	2013, 2016

== International pageants ==
- : Declared as Winner
- : Ended as runner-up or top 5/6 qualification
- : Ended as one of the finalists or semifinalists
- : Ended as special awards winner

=== Miss International ===
Year	Representative's Name	Hometown	Title	Placement	Special Awards
2025	Nan Inzali	(Chin State) Hakha	Miss International Myanmar 2025 (Appointed)	Top 10	Miss Popularity
2024	Kendra Erika	(Yangon Region) Yangon	Miss international Myanmar 2024 (Appointed)	Unplaced	
2023	Ei Ei Myint Aung Thein	(Yangon Region) Yangon	Miss International Myanmar 2023 (Appointed)	Unplaced	
2022	Did not compete				
2020/21	Due to the impact of COVID-19 pandemic, no pageant in 2020/21				
2019	Khin Ohmar Myint	(Shan State) Taunggyi	Miss Myanmar International 2019	Unplaced	
2018	May Yu Khatar	Yangon	Miss Myanmar International 2018	Unplaced	
2017	Sao Yoon Wadi Oo	(Shan State) Taunggyi	Miss Myanmar International 2017	Unplaced	
2016	Inngyin Htoo	Mandalay	Miss Myanmar International 2015	Unplaced	
2015	Emerald Nyein	Yangon	Miss Myanmar International 2015	Unplaced	
2014	May Barani Thaw	Yangon	1st Runner-Up of Miss Myanmar International 2014 (Assumed)	Unplaced	
2014	Khin Wai Phyo Han	Yangon	Miss Myanmar International 2014 (Dethroned)	Did not compete	
2013	Gonyi Aye Kyaw	Mandalay	Miss Myanmar International 2013	Unplaced	
2012	Nang Khin Zay Yar	(Shan State) Taunggyi	Miss Myanmar International 2012	Unplaced	1 Special Awards: Miss Internet
Miss Burma International
1961	Minnie Pu	Rangoon	Miss Burma International 1961	Unplaced	

== See also ==
- List of beauty pageants
