= Miss International Zambia =

Beauty pageant in Zambia

- Formation: 2004
- Type: Beauty Pageant
- Headquarters: Lusaka
- Location: Zambia
- Members: Miss International
- Official language: English
- National Director: Thumelo Mboneka

Miss International Zambia previously known as Miss Tourism Zambia is a beauty pageant in Zambia since 2004. The pageant is unrelated to Miss Universe Zambia, Miss Zambia or Miss Earth Zambia.

== History ==
Began in 2004 the ownership of Miss Tourism Zambia is Caroline Makasa who also franchised the Miss International for Zambia since 2004. The pageant aims to market the country's major tourist attractions which include the world famous Victoria Falls, vast wildlife resources, varied scenery, wilderness, diverse culture, national heritage, good weather, adventure activities, including hunting. These features are what are illustrated as themes and concepts in the pageant, which is among the consistently organised in the country. As the pageant also serves as a model and talent search competition, the judges will be looking for a youth tourism ambassador and advocate for wildlife and protection of the environment and climate change.

The Miss International Zambia allowed to 10 Province ambassadors to compete in National level.

== Trademarks ==
The Miss Tourism Zambia business name is registered at the Patents and Companies Registration Agency (PACRA) which is a semi-autonomous executive agency of the Zambian Ministry of Commerce, Trade and Industry. Its principal functions are to operate a legal system for registration and protection of commercial and industrial property and to serve as a legal depository of the information tendered for registration.

== Titleholders ==
Color key

- Declared as International winner

The Miss Tourism Zambia is also called as Miss International Zambia. Since 2014 the winner represents the country at the Miss International. On occasion, when the winner does not qualify (due to age) for either contest, a runner-up is sent. While the pageant also franchises other pageants such as Face of Beauty International, Miss Tourism World and Miss Tourism International.

Year	Miss Tourism Zambia	Province	Notes
2004	Cynthia Kanema	Lusaka	Miss Zambia who competed in four major pageants; Miss World 2003, Miss International 2004, Miss Earth 2005 & Miss Universe 2005
2005	Mofya Chisenga	Copperbelt	4th Runner-up at Miss Tourism Queen International 2005 & Miss Universe Zambia 2006
2006	Eunice Phiri	Lusaka	
2007	Karishma Patel	Lusaka	
2008/2009	Chipo Mulubisha	Copperbelt	
2010/2011	Athrone Milimo	Lusaka	Miss Humanity Zambia 2011
2012	Winnie-Fredah Atieno Kabwe	Lusaka	Miss Earth Zambia 2012 & Miss Grand Zambia 2014
2013	Candy Lupale	Lusaka	Miss Lusaka Golden Jubilee 2014, Miss NIPA 2010 & First Runner-up at Miss Southern Africa Zambia 2010
2014	Kalwa Norine Musonda	Central Province	Miss Freedom of the World 2013
2015	Candy Lupale	Lusaka	
2016/2017	Wendy Manyanga	Southern Province	

== International pageants ==
Color key

- Declared as winner
- Ended as runner-up
- Ended as one of the finalists or semifinalists

The Miss International is the only one Big Four pageant in under Miss Tourism Zambia directorship. While other Tourism pageants have added on Miss Tourism Zambia list. Zambia has existed competing in Miss International history since 2004. In 2004 Cynthia Kanema is the only one Miss Zambia who represented Zambia in Big Four pageants; began with Miss World 2003, Miss Universe 2005, Miss Earth 2005 then Miss International 2005 in Japan.

=== Miss International Zambia ===
Year	Miss International Zambia	Hometown	Placement	Special Awards
2004	Cynthia Kanema	Lusaka	Unplaced	
Did not compete between 2005—2007
2008	Chipo Mulubisha	Copperbelt	Unplaced	
Did not compete between 2009—2013
2014	Mercy Mukwiza	Lusaka	Unplaced	
2015	Brandina Lubuli	Copperbelt	Unplaced	
Did not compete in 2016
2017	Wendy Manyanga	Southern Province	Did not compete	
Did not compete in 2018
2019	Luwi Kawanda	Lusaka	Unplaced	
Did not compete between 2022—2025
2026	Faith Mukonko	Copperbelt	TBA	
