= Miss International Russia =

Russian beauty pageant established in 2016

Zvezda Rossii Miss International Russia Мисс Интернешнл Россия
- Formation: 2016
- Type: Beauty pageant
- Headquarters: Moscow
- Location: Russia
- Members: Miss International; Miss Intercontinental; Miss Cosmo
- Official language: Russian
- Key People: Pedro Fransisco; Ekaterina Sharova

Miss International Russia (Russian: Мисс Интернешнл Россия) is a national Beauty pageant in Russia.

== History ==
In 2016, Miss International Russia began to select its winner to the annual Miss International beauty pageant. Russia has been competed since 1994 and received 9 placements (3 runners-up and 6 semi-finalists) between 1994 and 2015. Before creating Miss International Russia, the delegates audited from casting or finalist at Miss Russia beauty pageant or Miss Moscow/Krasa Rossii winners or sometime the reigning Miss Russia sent to Miss International beauty pageant.

== Franchise holders ==
- Miss USSR pageant (1990)
- Miss Russia pageant (1993 - 2004)
- Krasa Rossii (2007)
- Igor Titov (2008 - 2015)
- Anton Paramonov (2016)
- Pedro Fransisco and Ekaterina Sharova (2017–Present)

== Titleholders ==
Color key

- Declared as Winner
- Ended as runner-up
- Ended as one of the finalists or semifinalists

Year	Miss International Russia	Subdivision	Placement	Special Awards	Notes
1993	Ilmira Shamsutdinova	Saratov Oblast	1st Runner-up		Miss USSR 1991; later Miss Universe Russia 1996
1994	Yelena Vitcheslavovna Gorbachova	Moscow	Unplaced		Miss International Russia 1994
1996	Yuliya Vladimirovna Ermolenko	Omsk	Unplaced		Miss International Russia 1996
1997	Victoriya Vladimirovna Maloivan	Armavir	Unplaced		Miss International Russia 1997
1999	Maria Tchebotkevitch	Krasnodar	Top 15		Miss International Russia 1999
2000	Svetlana Victorovna Goreva	Moscow Oblast	2nd Runner-up		Miss Universe Russia 2000; later Krasa Rossii 2003
2001	Tatiana Pavlova	Tatarstan	2nd Runner-up		Miss International Russia 2001
2002	Kseniya Yefimtseva	Irkutsk	Unplaced		Miss International Russia 2002
2003	Tatiana Chebotarevskaya	Saratov Oblast	Top 12		Miss International Russia 2003
2004	Nataliya Kolodeznikova	Yakutia	Top 15	Goodwill Ambassador	Miss International Russia 2004
2006	Yelena Vinogradova	Samara	Unplaced	Miss Best Language	Miss International Russia 2006
2007	Aleksandra Mazur	Moscow	Top 15		Krasa Rossii 2006
2008	Yekaterina Grushanina	Chelyabinsk	Unplaced		Miss Tourism Queen International 2009
2009	Kseniya Hrabovskaya	Khabarovsk	Unplaced	Miss Vitality	Miss Runet 2009
2010	Anna Danilova	Voronezh	Unplaced		Miss Moscow 2008
2011	Yelena Chepilchenko	Leningrad Oblast	Top 15	Miss Elegance	Miss Leningrad Oblast 2011
2012	Yekaterina Meglinskaya	Saratov	Unplaced	Best Talent	Miss International Russia 2012
2013	Olga Gaidabura	Bashkortostan	Top 15		Miss Exclusive Russia 2015
2014	Alina Rekko	Oryol	Unplaced		Miss International Russia 2014
2015	Valeriya Kufterina	Saint Petersburg	Unplaced		Miss International Russia 2015
2016	Alisa Manenok	Primorsky Krai	Top 15		Miss Primorsky Krai 2013
2017	Elena Kviatkevich	Saint Petersburg	Unplaced		Zvezda Rossii 2017
2018	Galina Lukina	Bashkortostan	Unplaced		Zvezda Rossii 2018
2019	Marina Oreshkina	Vladivostok	Unplaced		
Due to the impact of COVID-19 pandemic, no pageant in 2020 and 2021
Did not compete between 2022-2024
2025	Ekaterina Romanova	Novokuznetsk	Unplaced	Miss Photogenic	Krasa Rossii 2022

Notes:

- No representatives were sent in 1960-1992, 1995, 1998 and 2005.

== Zvezda Rossii Titles ==
=== Miss Intercontinental Russia ===
Color key

- : Declared as Winner
- : Ended as runner-up or top 5/6 qualification
- : Ended as one of the finalists or semifinalists
- : Ended as special awards winner

Year	Miss Russia	Federal Subject	Placement at Miss Intercontinental	Special awards
2015	Valentina Rasulova	Yaroslavl Oblast	Miss Intercontinental 2015	Miss Intercontinental Europe; Best Body
2016	Kseniya Kopylkova	Moscow	Unplaced	
2017	Natalia Naidenko	Moscow	Top 17	
2018	Tatyana Tuzova	Moscow	Unplaced	
2019	Marina Kharitonova	Moscow	Unplaced	
2020	Due to the impact of COVID-19 pandemic, no pageant in 2020			
2021	Polli Cannabis	Minsk	Unplaced	
2022	Anastasia Boslovyak	Komsomolsk-on-Amur	Top 20	
2023	Daria Reshta	Krasnodar	5th Runner-up	Miss Intercontinental Europe
2024	Ekaterina Mineeva	Novosibirsk	Top 20	Miss Photogenic
2025	Varvara Yakovenko	Crimea	Miss Intercontinental 2025	Miss Intercontinental Europe; Miss Photogenic

=== Miss Cosmo Russia ===
Year	Miss Russia	Federal Subject	Placement at Miss Intercontinental	Special awards
2024	Alisa Oganezova	Moscow	Unplaced	
2024	Anna Baranova (Representative of Crimea)	Crimea	Unplaced	
2025	Daria Orlova	Primorsky Krai	Unplaced	

=== Miss Supranational Russia ===
Year	Miss Russia	Federal Subject	Placement at Miss Supranational	Special awards
2009	Nataliya Koroleva	Moscow	Unplaced	Top Model
2010	Yevgeniya Shcherbakova	Moscow	Top 20	Top Model
2011	Yekaterina Rupasova	Moscow	Unplaced	
2013	Yana Dubnik	Novosibirsk Oblast	Top 20	
2015	Anna Grishina	Moscow	Unplaced	
2016	Vlada Gritsenko	Novosibirsk Oblast	Top 25	Best Body
2017	Anastasia Shcheglova	Moscow	Unplaced	
2018	Guzaliya Izmailova	Moscow	Top 25	
2019	Valeriya Skolota	Stavropol	Unplaced	
2021	Angelina Gorbunova	Moscow	Unplaced	
Did not compete since 2022 as the country was barred from competing due to its invasion of Ukraine

== See also ==
- Miss Russia
- Krasa Rossii
