= Miss Singapore International =

Annual national beauty pageant competition in Singapore

- Formation: 1961
- Type: Beauty pageant
- Headquarters: Singapore
- Location: Singapore
- Members: Miss International; Miss Supranational; Miss Asia Pacific International
- Official language: English
- Organization: Singapore Women’s Association (SWA)
- Website: Official website

Miss Singapore International is a competition organised by the Singapore Women's Association.

== History ==
The Singapore Women's Association (SWA), a charity organization has been organising beauty pageants since 1975 and is the first organisation to raise funds for the needy through beauty pageants. The funds raised have benefited many underprivileged children, old folks and the community. For the past 43 years, SWA has been the organiser of the Miss Singapore/Miss International beauty pageant.

=== Purposes ===
The fundamental aspect of the Miss Singapore International is its "Beauty with Heart & Purpose" to inculcate in our young women a sense of community and charity. It is a platform for young women to develop themselves as women leaders through the various training programs and involvement in its charity activities.

Our aim for this group is to create awareness, and encourage participation and contribution for charitable causes.

== Titleholders ==
Year	Miss International Singapore Elemental Court Titlists				
Year	International	Supranational	Asia Pacific International	Tourism Queen of the Year International	
2022	Scarlett Sim	Jiayi Sin	-	-	
Due to the impact of COVID-19 pandemic, no pageant in 2020 & 2021
2019	Charlotte Chia	Naomi Huth	-	-	
2018	Eileen Feng	S Priyanka Annuncia	Nerrine Ng	-	
2017	Kylie Yeo (Note: June Oh won Miss Singapore International but resigned her position. Runner-up Kylie Yeo replaced Oh as Miss Singapore International.)	Lynn Teo	Lynette Chua	Janice Sia	
2016	Wang Hui Qi	Ischelle Koo	Ariel Xu	-	
Year	International	First Runner-up	Second Runner-up	Third Runner-up	Fourth Runner-up
2015	Roxanne Zhang	Hannah Yang	Sharon Nadine	Vivian Quek	Pang Ling Ling
2014	Vanessa Sim	Sonia Mao	Deborah Yeo	-	-
2013	Chew Jia Min	Novell Tan	Michelle Goh	Leah Yang	Reine Wang
2012	Leong Ying Mae	Christina Ng	Shine Koh	Peggy Heng	Maisy Vanessa Lim

== Singapore representatives at Miss International ==
Color key

- Declared as Winner
- Ended as runner-up
- Ended as one of the finalists or semifinalists

The winner of Miss Singapore International represents her country at Miss International. On occasion, when the winner does not qualify (due to age) for either contest, a runner-up is sent. Singapore debut in 1960, before Miss Singapore International, another organization selected to the Miss International pageant. In 1960 Singapore placed for first time as Top 15 with Christl D’Cruz.

Year	Miss International Singapore	Placement at Miss International	Special Awards
2026	Janessa Yang	TBA	
2025	Tanisha Tan	Unplaced	
2024	Vanessa Tiara Tay	Unplaced	
2023	Chavelle Chong	Unplaced	
2022	Scarlett Sim	Unplaced	
Due to the impact of COVID-19 pandemic, no pageant in 2020 & 2021
2019	Charlotte Lucille-Chia	Unplaced	
2018	Eileen Feng	Unplaced	Miss International Asia
2017	Kylie Yeo	Unplaced	
2016	Wang Hui Qi	Unplaced	
2015	Roxanne Zhang	Unplaced	
2014	Vanessa Sim	Unplaced	
2013	Chew Jia Min	Unplaced	
2012	Leong Ying Mae	Unplaced	
2011	Stella Kae Sze	Unplaced	
2010	Kyla Tan	Unplaced	
2009	Annabelle Liang Xiang	Unplaced	
2008	Tok Wee Ee	Unplaced	
2007	Christabelle Tsai	Unplaced	
2006	Genecia Luo Wei Qi	Unplaced	
2005	Catherine Tan	Unplaced	
2004	Sherry Ng Yun Feng	Unplaced	
2003	Berlin Koh Meng Yean	Unplaced	
2002	Marie Wong Yan Yi	Unplaced	
2001	Juley Binte Abdullah	Unplaced	
2000	Lorraine Koo Mann Loo	Unplaced	
1999	Janice Koh Yeok Teng	Unplaced	
1998	Sudha Menon	Unplaced	
1997	Joey Chin Chin Chan	Unplaced	
1996	Carel Siok Liang	Unplaced	
1995	Lynette Lee	Unplaced	
1994	Joycelyn Ching	Unplaced	
1993	Teri Su Lian Tan	Unplaced	
1992	Li Li Goh	Unplaced	
1991	Audrey Siok Ling Tan	Unplaced	
1990	Genni Wan	Unplaced	
1989	Pamela Kurt Ha Chee	Unplaced	
1988	Angeline Lip Lai Fong	Unplaced	
1987	Marjorie Tan	Unplaced	
1986	Teo Ser Lee	Unplaced	
1985	Audrey Chua Chwee Lan	Unplaced	
1984	Wong Leng	Unplaced	
1983	Patricia Ngow	Unplaced	
1982	Angela Tan	Unplaced	
1981	Shanaz Ali Hussein Gandhi	Unplaced	
1980	Jennifer Liong	Top 15	
1979	Annie Tan Chen	Unplaced	
1978	Felina Teo Bee Wah	Unplaced	
1977	Theresa Leu San	Unplaced	
1976	Sandra Jane Binny	Unplaced	
1975	Jenny Tan Gwek Eng	Unplaced	
1974	Valerie Oh Choon Lian	Unplaced	
1973	Doris Ong Swee Gek	Unplaced	
1972	May Tan	Unplaced	
1971	Did not compete		
1970	Margaret Tan Quee Lin	Unplaced	
1969	Jenny Serwan Wong	Unplaced	
1968	Madeleine Teo Kim Neo	Unplaced	
1967	Angela Attias	Unplaced	
1966	No competition held		
Did not compete between 1963-1965
1962	Nancy Liew	Unplaced	
1961	Julie Koh Moot Lei	Withdrew	Due to Hepatitis.
1960	Christl D'Cruz	Top 15	

== See also ==
- Miss Singapore Universe
- Miss World Singapore
- Miss Earth Singapore
