= Miss Marianas =

Beauty pageant

Miss Marianas Organization
- Formation: 1976
- Type: Beauty pageant
- Headquarters: Saipan
- Location: Northern Marianas
- Members: Miss International
- Official language: English
- National director: Chrispin Deleon Guerrero
- Key people: Laila Boyer
- Website: Official page

Miss Marianas is the national Beauty pageant in Northern Marianas.

== History ==
In 2003, the NMBPA sent the winner to Miss World. The runner-up of Miss Marianas has traditionally competed at the Miss International pageant.

In 2015, Miss Marianas will return in new concept from Stellar Marianas Group and will select the winners in 2015 early.

In 2015, Jian Joyner, a sophomore majoring in liberal arts at Northern Marianas College and a tutor at Salty Saipan Corporation was crowned as Miss Marianas during the pageant at the Hyatt's SandCastle on Thursday night where she also won the Stellar Star Best in National Costume and Best in Swimsuit awards. According to Marianas Variety, part of Joyner's prize is an all-expense-paid trip to compete in the Miss International 2015 Pageant from Delta Air Lines and the Marianas Visitors Authority.

== Titleholders ==
Year	Miss Marianas	Represented	Notes
1976	Candelaria Flores Borja	As Teo	
1977	Margarita Benavente Camacho	San Vicente	
1978	Julia Salas Concepcion	Chalan Kanoa Dist.#1	
1979	Barbara Torres	Chalan Kanoa Dist #3	
1980	Angelina Camacho Chong	Garapan	
1981	Juanita Masga Mendiola	Tinian	
1982	Sheryl Sonoda Sizemore	Chalan Kanoa Dist #1	
1983	Thelma Mafnas	Sadog Tasi	
1984	Porsche Salas	Chalan Kanoa Dist#4	
1985	Antoinette Marie Flores	Susupe	
1986	Christine Guerrero	Capital Hill	
1987	Luciana Seman Ada	Fina Sisu	
1988	Ruby Jean Hamilton	Gualo Rai	
1989	Teresa Wamar	San Antonio	
1990	Edwina Taitano Menzies	Tinian	
1991	Sharon Rosario	Chalan Lau Lau	
1992	Imelda Antonio	Puerto Rico	
1993	Victoria Taisakan Tudela	San Jose	
1994	Elizabeth Tomokane	Gualo Rai	
1995	Karah Kirschenheiter	Capital Hill	
1996	Kathleen Williams	Garapan	
1997	Melanie Sibetang	Oleai	
1998	Helene Yun Lizama	Dan Dan	
1999	Cherlyn Cabrera	Chalan Kanoa Dist#1	
2001	Janet Han King	Tinian	
2002	Virginia Ann Gridley	Chalan Kanoa	
2003	Kimberly Castro Reyes	Gualo Rai	
2004	Tracy Lynn Del Rosario	Koblerville	Did not compete
2006	Shequita Deleon Guerrero Bennett	Kagman	
2009	Sorene Maratita	Kagman	
2015	Jian Joyner	Saipan	
2016	Peachy Quitugua	Saipan	
2018	Celine Concepcion Cabrera	Saipan	
2019	Shannon Tudela Sasamoto	Saipan	
2021	Savannah Lyn Delos Santos	Saipan	

== Titleholders under Miss Marianas org. ==
=== Miss Marianas International ===
- : Declared as Winner
- : Ended as runner-up or top 5/6 qualification
- : Ended as one of the finalists or semifinalists
- : Ended as special awards winner

Year	Miss Northern Marianas	Represented	Placement at Miss International	Special Award(s)
1983	Margarita Tenorio Benavente	Saipan	Unplaced	
1984	Mary Celeste Sasakura Mendiola	Saipan	Unplaced	
1985	Antoinette Marie Flores	Susupe	Unplaced	
1986	Lisa Aquiningoc Manglona	Saipan	Unplaced	
1987	Luciana Seman Ada	Fina Sisu	Unplaced	
1988	Gloria Patricia Propst	Saipan	Unplaced	
1989	Teresa Wamar	San Antonio	Unplaced	
1990	Edwina Taitano Menzies	Tinian	Unplaced	Miss Friendship
1991	Christina Rasa Salas	Saipan	Unplaced	
1992	Christina Vincoy Borja	Saipan	Unplaced	
1993	Tayna Castro Belyeu	Saipan	Unplaced	Miss Friendship
1994	Mary Michelle Manibusan	Gualo Rai	Unplaced	
1995	Elaine Tudela	Gualo Rai	Unplaced	
1996	Kathleen Williams	Garapan	Unplaced	Miss Friendship
1997	Maria Theresa "Marites" Acosta	Saipan	Unplaced	
1998	Sonya Palacios Pangelinan	Dan Dan	Unplaced	
1999	Miyuki Coretta Hill	Okinawa	Unplaced	Miss Friendship
Did not compete in 2000
2001	Rowina Taimanao Ogo	Saipan	Unplaced	
2002	Christine Juwelle Cunanan	Saipan	Unplaced	
2003	Nancie Rae King Ripple	Saipan	Unplaced	
2004	Kenyelyn Litumular Arriola	Saipan	Unplaced	
Did not compete in 2005
2006	Shequita Deleon Guerrero Bennett	Kagman	Unplaced	
Did not compete between 2007—2008
2009	Sorene Aldan Maratita	Kagman	Unplaced	
Did not compete between 2010—2014
2015	Jian Joyner	Saipan	Unplaced	
2016	Peachy Quitugua	Saipan	Unplaced	
Did not compete in 2017
2018	Celine Concepcion Cabrera	Saipan	Unplaced	
2019	Shannon Tudela Sasamoto	Saipan	Unplaced	
Due to the impact of COVID-19 pandemic, no pageant between 2020 and 2021
2022	Savannah Lyn Delos Santos	Saipan	Top 15	
Did not compete since 2023

== Former titleholders under Miss Marianas org. ==
=== Miss Marianas Universe ===
- : Declared as Winner
- : Ended as runner-up or top 5/6 qualification
- : Ended as one of the finalists or semifinalists
- : Ended as special awards winner

Year	Miss Northern Marianas	Represented	Placement at Miss Universe	Special Award(s)
1976	Candelaria Flores Borja	As Teo	Unplaced	
1977	Margarita Benavente Camacho	San Vicente	Unplaced	
1978	Julia Salas Concepcion	Chalan Kanoa Dist.#1	Unplaced	
1979	Barbara Torres	Chalan Kanoa Dist #3	Unplaced	
1980	Angelina Camacho Chong	Garapan	Unplaced	
1981	Juanita Mendiola	Tinian	Unplaced	
1982	Sheryl Sonoda Sizemore	Chalan Kanoa Dist #1	Unplaced	
1983	Thelma Mafnas	Sadog Tasi	Unplaced	
1984	Porsche Salas	Chalan Kanoa Dist#4	Unplaced	
1985	Antoinette Marie Flores	Susupe	Unplaced	
1986	Christine Guerrero	Capital Hill	Unplaced	
1987	Luciana Seman Ada	Fina Sisu	Unplaced	
1988	Ruby Jean Hamilton	Gualo Rai	Unplaced	
1989	Soreen Villanueva	Capital Hill	Unplaced	
1990	Edwina Taitano Menzies	Tinian	Unplaced	
1991	Sharon Rosario	Chalan Lau Lau	Unplaced	
1992	Imelda Antonio	Puerto Rico	Unplaced	
1993	Victoria Taisakan Tudela	San Jose	Unplaced	
1994	Elizabeth Tomokane	Gualo Rai	Unplaced	
1995	Karah Kirschenheiter	Capital Hill	Unplaced	
1996	Kathleen Williams	Garapan	Unplaced	
1997	Melanie Sibetang	Oleai	Unplaced	
1998	Helene Yun Lizama	Dan Dan	Unplaced	
1999	Cherlyn Cabrera	Chalan Kanoa Dist#1	Unplaced	
Did not compete in 2000
2001	Janet Han King	Tinian	Unplaced	
2002	Virginia Ann Gridley	Chalan Kanoa	Unplaced	
Did not compete between 2003—2005
2006	Shequita Deleon Guerrero Bennett	Kagman	Unplaced	
Did not compete since 2007—Present

=== Miss Marianas World ===
- : Declared as Winner
- : Ended as runner-up or top 5/6 qualification
- : Ended as one of the finalists or semifinalists
- : Ended as special awards winner

Year	Miss Northern Marianas	Represented	Placement at Miss World	Special Award(s)
2003	Kimberly Castro Reyes	Gualo Rai	Unplaced	
Did not compete since 2004—Present

== Other License Holders ==
=== Miss Earth Northern Mariana Islands ===
- : Declared as Winner
- : Ended as runner-up or top 5/6 qualification
- : Ended as one of the finalists or semifinalists
- : Ended as special awards winner

Year	Miss Earth Northern Marianas	Represented	Placement at Miss Earth	Special Award(s)
2025	Aria Keilbach	Saipan	Top 25	

== Notes ==
- In 1981, the newly crowned queen, Juanita Masga Mendiola relinquished her title to further education. Her successor is unknown as of this time.
- In 1989, newly crowned queen Soreen Villanueva was dethroned for reasons undisclosed, and eventually was succeeded by Teresa Wamar who competed at the Miss International Pageant.
- For the competing years 2000, 2006, 2007, 2009–2014, and 2017 no pageant was held.
- In 2003, Kimberly Castro Reyes was crowned Miss Marianas Universe of that year. Eventually however, she was unable to compete at the national competition in Panama City, Panama that year due to a miscommunication between the pageant's then-organization The Northern Marianas Beauty Pageant Association (NMBPA) and Miss Universe. Outrage and protest had resulted from this by the community and the winning contestant's family and friends. Instead, she was eventually sent to compete at Miss World 2003 in Sanya, China.
- In 2004, Tracy Del Rosario was crowned Miss Marianas World for that year. It was the only time since the U.S. territory's pageant participation, that a winner of the pageant would be crowned a different title other than Miss Marianas Universe. The year before, crowned Miss Marianas Universe-winner Reyes had been expected to compete at its national pageant but was instead sent to Miss World. This was the last year the NMBPA held the pageant license for its competing territory. They disbanded quickly after the year's pageant.
- Since 2005, a new non-profit pageant and talent organization Stellar Marianas currently directs and holds the license to the Miss Marianas Universe.
- Sorene Maratita, Miss Marianas Universe 2008, did not compete in Miss Universe 2008 due to lack of sponsorship and funding. She represented the Marianas in Miss International.
