= Tetsuya Bessho =

Japanese actor and radio presenter

- 別所 哲也
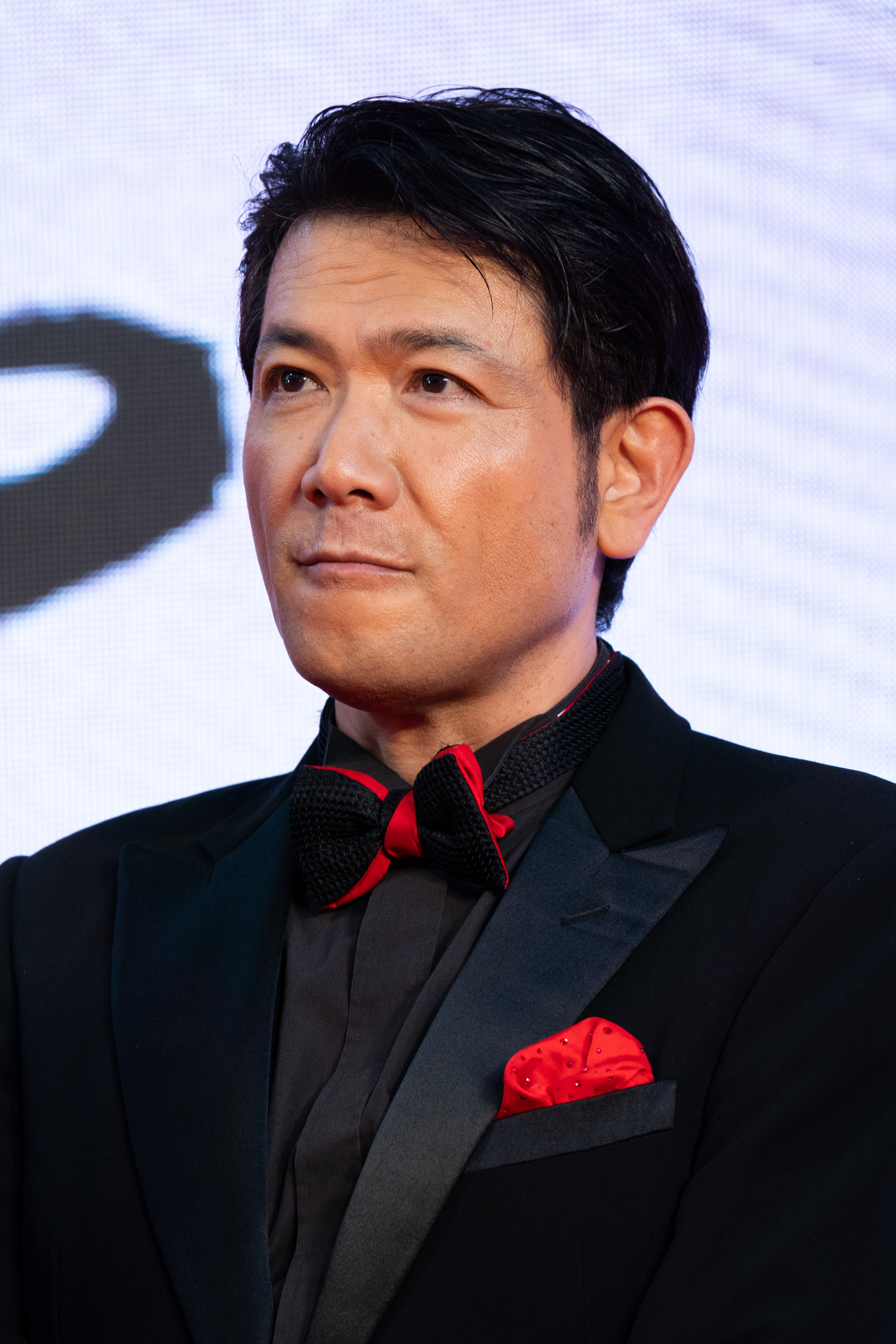
- Bessho in 2019
- Born: August 31, 1965 (age 60); Shimada, Shizuoka, Japan
- Education: Keio University
- Occupations: Actor, radio presenter
- Years active: 1987–present

Tetsuya Bessho (別所 哲也, Bessho Tetsuya; born August 31, 1965) is a Japanese actor and radio presenter. Since 2014, he has hosted the Miss International pageant.

== Filmography ==
=== Films ===
- Solar Crisis (1990), Ken Minami
- Godzilla vs. Mothra (1992), Takuya Fujita
- Art of Fighting (1993), Ryo Sakazaki (voice)
- Parasite Eve (1997), Yoshizumi Takatsugu
- Ultraman: The Next (2004), Shunichi Maki/Ultraman
- You are Umasou (Film) (2010), Baku
- Tatsumi (2011), voice
- Himawari no Oka 1983-nen Natsu (2015)
- Pure Japanese (2022)
- The Secret Battlefield (2026), Tadao Ikawa

=== TV series ===
- Dr X Surgery Daimon Michiko (2013)
- Gunshi Kanbei (2014), Yamanaka Shikanosuke
- Crow's Blood (2016)
- Simulation: Defeat in the Summer of 1941 (2025), Tadao Ikawa

=== Radio ===
- J-Wave Tokyo Morning Radio (J-Wave) – 2009–present

=== Theatre ===
- The Fantastics (1987), Mortimer
- Glass Mask (1988), Yuu Sakurakouji
- When Harry Met Sally... (2002), Harry
- Les Misérables (2003–2011), Jean Valjean
- Miss Saigon (2004–2009), The Engineer
- Urinetown (2004–2011), Bobby Strong (2004), Officer Lockstock (2011)
- Here's Love (2004–2005), Fred Gaily
- NINE the Musical (2005), Guido
- The Woman in White (2007), Walter Hartright
- Opera do Malandro (2009), Max
- The Coast of Utopia (2009), Ivan Turgenev
- Wonderful Town (2010), Robert/Bob Baker
- A Moment to Remember (2010–2012), Choi Chul-soo
- Reading Millionaires' Rechita-Karuda "Yoshitsune" (2012)
- Last Dance -The Musical Koshiji Fubuki - (2012), Maki Kotaro
- Hotel Majestic (2013), Ryuji Okochi
- Upheaval -GEKIDO- (2013), Naniwa Kawashima
- On The Stage crank ☆ Inn (2013), Orio Wakamura
- Carmen (2014), Mayor
- Sherlock Holmes 2: A Bloody Game (2015), Clive
- South Pacific (2015), Emile de Becque
- Love Letters (2016), Andy
- Death Note: The Musical (2017), Soichiro Yagami
- My Fair Lady (2018–2021), Professor Henry Higgins
- CESARE ~Creator of Destruction~ (2023), Rodrigo Borgia
- JoJo's Bizarre Adventure: Phantom Blood (2024), George Joestar I
- 9 to 5 (2024), Franklin Hart
- Tamiou (2026), Taizan Muto

=== Others ===
- Miss International World Competition (2014–2023), Host
  - Miss International 2014 on November 11, 2014 at Grand Prince Hotel Takanawa with Kei Fujimoto
  - Miss International 2015 on November 5, 2015 at Grand Prince Hotel Takanawa with Chisato Kaiho
  - Miss International 2016 on October 27, 2016 at Tokyo Dome City Hall with Amy Ota
  - Miss International 2017 on November 14, 2017 at Tokyo Dome City Hall with Amy Ota
  - Miss International 2018 on November 9, 2018 at Tokyo Dome City Hall with Nikki
  - Miss International 2019 on November 12, 2019 at Tokyo Dome City Hall with Ayoko Kisa and Kylie Verzosa
  - Miss International 2022 on December 13, 2022 at Tokyo Dome City Hall with Rachel Chan
  - Miss International 2023 on October 26, 2023 at Yoyogi National Gymnasium with Rachel Chan

=== Dubbing ===
- The Stolen Princess, King Vladimir

== Bibliography ==
- 夢をカタチにする仕事力 (in Japanese). Japan: Kobunsha. 2009. ISBN 978-4334034078.
