= Miss Internacional Chile =

Beauty contest

Miss Chile International
- Formation: 1996
- Type: Beauty pageant
- Headquarters: Santiago
- Location: Chile
- Members: Miss International
- Official language: Spanish
- Director: Eleni Sira

Miss Internacional Chile is a national beauty pageant that selects Chile's representative to the Miss International pageant.

== History ==
Beginnings and Consolidation (1965 – 1980)

Chilean representation in the pageant formally began in 1965 with Matilde Von San Jorge González. During the 1970s, Chile maintained a regular presence, sending delegates annually starting in 1970.

The most significant turning point of this era occurred in 1980, when Mónica Salinas Ruiz reached the position of 4th runner-up, marking the highest achievement by a Chilean in the history of this competition to date.

Transition and Top Placements (1990 – 2010)

After a hiatus during the second half of the 1980s, Chile resumed its participation with sporadic appearances. During this period, the country managed to stand out again by entering the semifinalist rounds on two occasions:

- 2001: Paula Orchard successfully placed among the Top 12.
- 2007: María Ana Salas Gorboi classified within the Top 15.

Despite these successes, consistency was affected by changes in national franchises, resulting in notable absences in years such as 2008, 2009, and the period between 2011 and 2013.

Modern Era and Recent Challenges (2014 – Present)

Since 2014, Chile has sought to professionalize the preparation of its candidates to regain lost ground in the Asian pageant. This stage was interrupted globally by the COVID-19 pandemic, which forced the cancellation of the competition between 2020 and 2021.

Following the resumption of activities in 2022 with Catalina Huenulao, the country has maintained uninterrupted representation, highlighting the participations of Valerie Johnson (2023)

Since 2024, the event has been run by CNB Chile (National Beauty Contest), under the direction of Eleni Sira.

In this new stage, the pageant has undergone a progressive evolution to consolidate its presence in the country:

- 2024: The competition resumed with a selected group of 8 candidates. Kelsey Kohler was crowned Miss International Chile 2024.
- 2025: The organization opted for the direct appointment of the representative to strengthen her preparation. Nallely Bobadilla was crowned Miss International Chile 2025.
- 2026: The pageant is taking a significant leap forward by opening up to regional franchises, allowing candidates from different communes and sectors across Chile to compete for the national crown.

This regional expansion aims to decentralize the pageant, highlighting the talent and identity of women from throughout the national territory, while establishing a more solid and participatory structure for the future of pageantry in Chile.

On August 23, 2026, the final of the Miss International Chile 2026 pageant was held at the Teatro Fiebre in Santiago, Chile. Representatives from ten communes and regions of the country (Arica, Concón, Iquique, La Florida, La Reina, Los Ángeles, Providencia, Rancagua, Valparaíso, and Viña del Mar) competed for the crown.

The crown and the title of winner were awarded to the representative of Valparaíso, Bárbara Wolfenson. Wolfenson is a dental surgeon, speaks English, and serves as the dental director of the Fundación Felipe Coloma.

== Titleholders ==
Color key

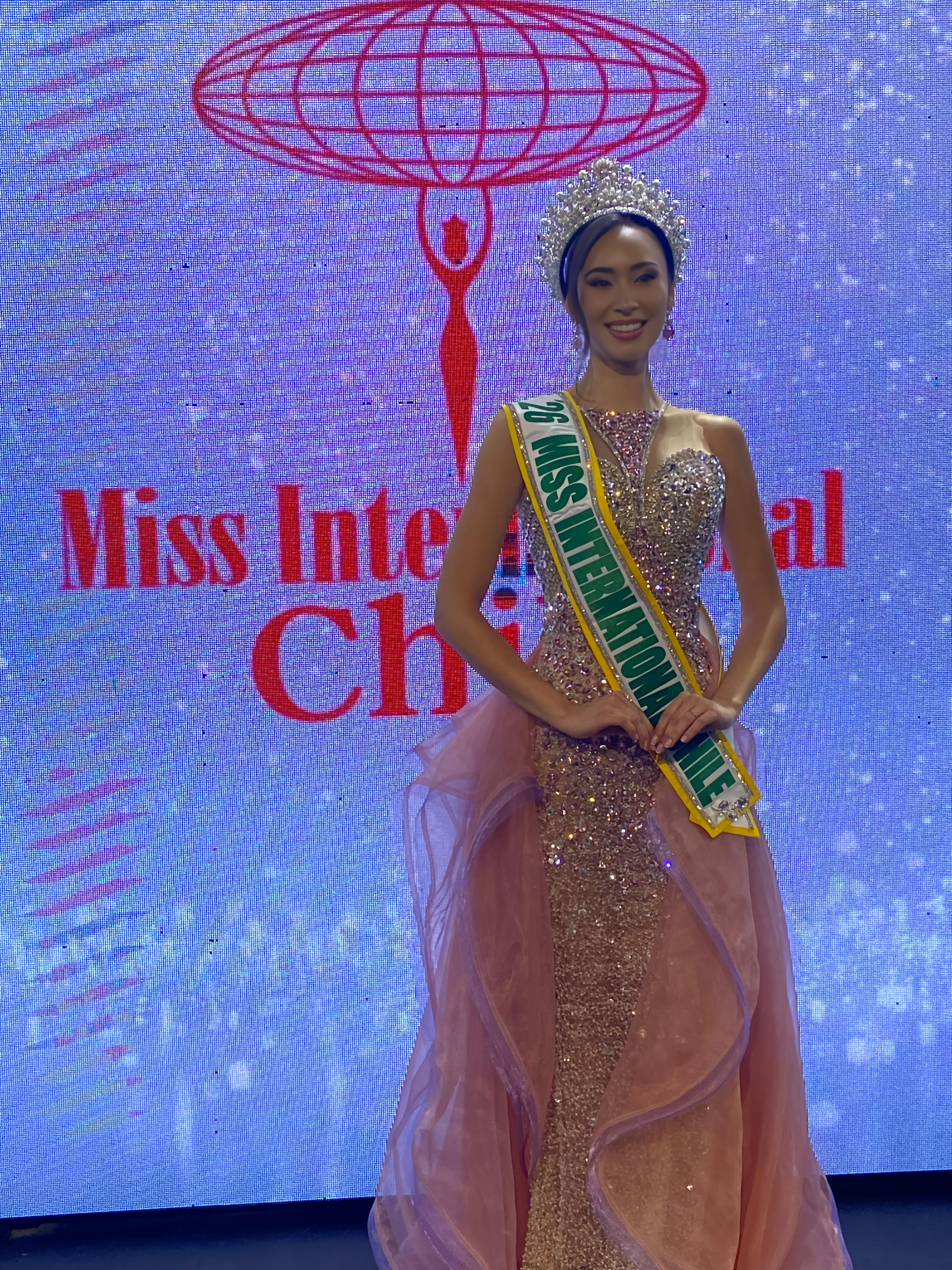
MISS INTERNATIONAL CHILE 2026 - Barbara Wolfenson

Year	Miss International Chile	Placement at Miss International
2026	Bárbara Wolfenson	TBA
2025	Nallely Bobadilla	Unplaced
2024	Kelsey Kohler	Unplaced
2023	Valerie Johnson	Unplaced
2022	Catalina Huenulao	Unplaced
Due to the impact of COVID-19 pandemic, no competition held between 2020—2021
2019	Ximena Huala	Unplaced
2018	Maria Pia Vilches	Unplaced
2017	Estefania Galeota	Unplaced
2014	Tania Dahuabe	Unplaced
2010	Tanya del Solar Prussing	Unplaced
2007	Mary Ann Salas Gorboi	Top 15
2004	Francisca Valenzuela Rendic	Unplaced
2003	Christiane Balmelli Fournier	Unplaced
2001	Paula Orchard	Top 12
1996	Alexandra de Granade Errázuriz	Unplaced
1980	Mónica Salinas Ruiz	4th Runner-up
1979	Paulina Quiroga	Unplaced
1978	Marianela Toledo Rojas	Unplaced
1977	Silvia Ebner Cataldo	Unplaced
1976	María Antonieta Rosselló	Unplaced
1975	Ana Papic Marinovic	Unplaced
1974	María del Carmen Bono	Unplaced
1973	Ethel Klenner Rodríguez	Unplaced
1972	Pamela Santibáñez Berg	Unplaced
1971	Alicia Vicuña	Unplaced
1970	Berta Goldsmith	Unplaced
1965	Matilde Von Saint George González	Unplaced
