= Miss International China =

Beauty contest

- 國際小姐選美大賽中國賽區
- Formation: 2002
- Type: Beauty pageant
- Headquarters: Beijing
- Location: China
- Members: Miss International
- Official language: Chinese
- Company: Aiwan Group
- Website: Official website missinternational.com.cn

The Miss International China or well known as "Miss China International" (traditional Chinese: 國際小姐選美大賽中國賽區; simplified Chinese: 国际小姐选美大赛中国赛区; pinyin: guójì xiǎojiě xuǎnměi dàsài Zhōngguó sàiqū) is an annual national Beauty pageant that selects China's representative to the Miss International pageant.

== History ==
Miss International China was founded in 2002 by the Ministry of Tourism of the People's Republic of China. Current organization, Aiwan Group is the official Miss China International Franchise holder in China. In 2012 the Chinese representative ranked the Second Runner-up and it was the highest placement from China in Miss International history.

== Titleholders ==
Color key

- Declared as Winner
- Ended as runner-up
- Ended as one of the finalists or semifinalists

Year	Miss International China	Chinese name	Province	Placement	Special Awards	Notes
2002	Wei Amy Yan	閻巍	Jilin	Unplaced	Miss Photogenic	Miss Model of the World 2002
2003	Wang Shan	王珊	Chongqing	Top 12	Best National Costume	
2004	Sun Yue	孫岳	Beijing	Top 15	Best National Costume	
2005	Yang Li	楊麗	Shanghai	Unplaced	Miss Photogenic	
2006	Chen Qian	陳倩	Hebei	Top 12	Miss Compassionate	
2007	Ding Lina	丁莉娜	Hebei	Unplaced		Appointed to be the Charity Ambassador of Hebei Province on September 23 at an awarding ceremony in Shijiazhuang, capital of Hebei Province
2008	Liu Changwen	劉暢文	Beijing	3rd Runner-up		
2009	Wang Qian	王芊	Sichuan	Unplaced	Miss Friendship	
2010	Yuan Siyi	袁思怡	Hubei	2nd Runner-up	People's Choice Award	
2011	Baixue Yuting	白雪玉婷	Henan	Unplaced	Best Talent	
2013	Jin Ying	金鶯	Beijing	Unplaced		
2014	Wei Lisi	威力斯	Inner Mongolia	Unplaced		
2015	Liu Xinyue	劉欣悅	Henan	Unplaced		
2016	Zhou Xinna	周欣娜	Beijing	Unplaced		
2017	Wang Shengxu	王晟旭	Shandong	Did not compete		Due to personal reasons, resigned and a runner-up took over
2017	Shi Jia	石 佳	Jiangsu	Unplaced		Miss International China 2017
2018	Wang Chaoyuan	王朝源	Guilin	Unplaced	Miss Visit Japan Tourism Ambassador	
2019	Wang Shengxu	王朝源	Shandong	Unplaced		
Due to the impact of COVID-19 pandemic, no pageant in 2020-2021
2024	Shi Xiaoxuan	石晓轩	Beijing	Unplaced		
2025	Le Weihe	樂偉和	Shanghai	Unplaced		
2026	Kunyu Shi	石昆玉	Shanghai	TBA		

== See also ==
- Miss World China
- Miss Universe China
- Miss Earth China
