= Miss International Japan =

Japanese beauty pageant

- Formation: 1960
- Type: Beauty pageant
- Headquarters: Tokyo
- Location: Japan
- Members: Miss International
- Official language: Japanese
- President: Akemi Shimomura
- Website: https://www.miss-international.org/jp/

Miss International Japan is a national Beauty pageant in Japan. It was created in 1960 in response to Japan's then-recent lack of finalists at the Miss International pageant.

== History ==
Miss International Japan Beauty pageant has consisted of the passion and energy given by the “Goodwill Ambassadors of Beauty" from all over Japan country who aspire to "contribute to global society". This pageant is under of Miss International Organization by ICA (International Cultural Association).

The winner of Miss International Japan will be contributing at the Miss International pageant. Since 1960 participating at the pageant, Japan has only one winner, Ikumi Yoshimatsu (吉松 育美) from Tosu, Japan.

== International Cultural Association ==
The Association was approved and founded in April 1969 (Showa 44) as an incorporated organization of the Ministry of Foreign Affairs (Cultural Exchange Division), for the purpose of "friendship and goodwill between all nations of the world" through international exchange.

== Titleholders ==
Color key

- Declared as Winner
- Ended as runner-up
- Ended as one of the finalists or semifinalists
- Ended as special award winner

Year	Miss International Japan	Japanese	Represented	Placement	Special Awards	National competition date	World competition date
2027	TBA	TBA	TBA	TBA	TBA	TBA	TBA
2026	Michiru Yakuwa	八鍬ミチル	Yamagata	TBA	TBA	December 9, 2025	November 25, 2026
2025	Ai Nozaki	野崎愛	Yamanashi	Top 20	Miss Friendship	December 10, 2024	November 27, 2025
2024	Mei Ueda	上田芽生	Kumamoto	Top 20	Miss International Asia	November 28, 2023	November 12, 2024
2023	Tamao Yoneyama	米山珠緒	Tokyo			November 8, 2022	October 26, 2023
2022	Kiko Matsuo	松尾 綺子	Saga		Miss International Asia	November 30, 2021	December 13, 2022
2021	Due to the impact of COVID-19 pandemic, no pageant in 2021						
2020	Chiho Terauchi	寺内 千穂	Tochigi	Did not compete		November 26, 2019	N/A
2019	Tomomi Okada	岡田 朋峰	Tokyo			October 23, 2018	November 12, 2019
2018	Hinano Sugimoto	杉本 雛乃	Tokyo	Top 8		October 30, 2017	November 9, 2018
2017	Natsuki Tsutsui	筒井 菜月	Saitama	4th Runner-up	Best National Costume	October 25, 2016	November 14, 2017
2016	Junna Yamagata	山形 純菜	Iwate	Top 15		November 3, 2015	October 27, 2016
2015	Arisa Nakagawa	中川 愛理沙	Chiba		Best National Costume	November 4, 2014	November 5, 2015
2014	Rira Hongo	本郷 李來	Tokyo			January 25, 2014	November 11, 2014
2013	Yukiko Takahashi	高橋 由紀子	Tokyo			November 4, 2012	December 17, 2013
2012	Ikumi Yoshimatsu	吉松 育美	Saga	Miss International 2012	Miss Photogenic	November 20, 2011	October 21, 2012
2011	Nagomi Murayama	村山 和実	Kanagawa			November 20, 2010	November 6, 2011
2010	Etsuko Kanagae	金ヶ江 悦子	Osaka	Top 15	Miss Elegance	December 13, 2009	November 7, 2010
2009	Yuka Nakayama	中山 由香	Fukuoka	Top 15	Miss Congeniality	October 25, 2008	November 28, 2009
2008	Kyoko Sugiyama	杉山 恭子	Kanagawa	Top 12		October 15, 2007	November 8, 2008
2007	Hisako Shirata	白田 久子	Osaka	Top 15	Miss Photogenic	October 15, 2006	October 15, 2007
2006	Mami Sakurai	櫻井 麻美	Tokyo	Top 12		September 26, 2005	November 11, 2006
2005	Naomi Ishizaka	石坂 直美	Tokyo	Top 12		October 5, 2004	September 26, 2005
2004	Tamiko Kawahara	川原 多美子	Ibaraki	Top 15		October 8, 2003	October 16, 2004
2003	Saeko Matsumi	松見 早枝子	Tokyo	Top 12	Miss Congeniality	September 30, 2002	October 8, 2003
2002	Hana Urushima	漆島 華	Kyoto	2nd runner-up			September 30, 2002
2001	Hanako Suzuki	鈴木 華子	Saitama	Top 15			October 4, 2001
2000	Kanako Shibata	柴田 加奈子	Hokkaido	Top 15			October 4, 2000
1999	Kana Onoda	小野田 加奈	Fukushima	Top 15			
1998	Megumi Taira	平 恵	Tokyo	Top 15			
1997	Sayuri Seki	関 さゆり	Saitama	Top 15			
1996	Akiko Sugano	菅野 安希子	Tokyo	Top 15			
1995	Yuka Kondo	近藤 由夏	Osaka	Top 15			
1994	Tomomi Hanamura	花村 ともみ	Aichi	Top 15			
1993	Masayo Shibasaki	柴崎 雅代	Kanagawa	Top 15			
1992	Tomoko Nishiki	錦 知子	Osaka				
1991	Miho Takata	高田 美穂	Ehime	Top 15			
1990	Hiroko Ohnishi	大西 啓子	Hyōgo	Top 15			
1989	Tamae Ogura	小倉 玉江	Osaka				
1988	Yuki Egami	江上 有希	Fukui	Top 15			
1987	Yayoi Morita	盛田 弥生	Yamanashi	Top 15			
1986	Rika Kobayashi	小林 利花	Shizuoka	Top 15			
1985	Makiko Matsumoto	松本 万貴子	Osaka	Top 15			
1984	Junko Ueno	上野 順子	Osaka	Top 15			
1983	Akemi Fujita	藤田 明美	Yamaguchi	Top 15			
1982	Yukiko Tsutsumi	堤 由記子	Hokkaido				
1981	Mika Moriwaki	森脇 美香	Okayama	Top 15			
1980	Mayumi Kanbara	蒲原 まゆみ	Osaka		Miss Congeniality		
1979	Hideko Haba	羽場 秀子	Tokyo	4th runner-up			
1978	Atsuko Taguchi	田口 淳子	Akita				
1977	Mieko Kojima	小島 三恵子	Saitama				
1976	Kumie Nakamura	中村 久美江	Osaka	4th runner-up			
1975	Sumiko Kumagai	熊谷 澄子	Tokyo	Top 15			
1974	Hideko Shigekawa	茂川 秀子	Osaka	Top 15			
1973	Miki Yaita	矢板 美季	Hokkaido	Top 15			
1972	Yuko Tamehisa	為久 優子	Yamaguchi	Top 15			
1971	Reiko Yoneyama	米山 礼子	Yamanashi	Top 15			
1970	Toshie Suda	須田 敏恵	Yamanashi	3rd Runner-up			
1969	Akemi Okemoto	桶本 明美	Hiroshima	Top 15			
1968	Yoko Sunami	砂見 葉子	Fukuoka	Top 15			
1967	Hiroko Sasaki	佐々木 裕子	Tokyo	Top 15			
~~1966~~	cancellation						
1965	Hiroko Fukushima	福島 宏子	Tokyo				
1964	Naoko Matsui	松井 尚子	Fukuoka	Top 15			
1963	Shizuko Shimizu	清水 静子	Tokyo				
1962	Kaoru Maki	牧 かほる	Tokyo	Top 15			
1961	Atsuko Kyoto	京藤 敦子	Fukui				
1960	Michiko Takagi	高木 美智子	Osaka	Top 15			

=== Winners by prefectures ===
Prefectures	Titles	Years
Tokyo	16	1962, 1963, 1965, 1967, 1975, 1979, 1996, 1998, 2003, 2005, 2006, 2013, 2014, 2018, 2019, 2023
Osaka	10	1974, 1976, 1980, 1984, 1985, 1989, 1992, 1995, 2007, 2010
Saitama	4	1977, 1997, 2001, 2017
Yamanashi	4	1970, 1971, 1987, 2025
Kanagawa	3	1993, 2008, 2011
Hokkaido	3	1973, 1982, 2000
Fukuoka	3	1964, 1968, 2009
Saga	2	2012, 2022
Fukui	2	1961, 1988
Yamaguchi	2	1972, 1983
Yamagata	1	2026
Kumamoto	1	2024
Tochigi	1	2020
Iwate	1	2016
Chiba	1	2015
Ibaraki	1	2004
Kyoto	1	2002
Fukushima	1	1999
Aichi	1	1994
Ehime	1	1991
Hyōgo	1	1990
Shizuoka	1	1986
Okayama	1	1981
Akita	1	1978
Hiroshima	1	1969

== Controversy ==
In 2013 edition, for the first time in history, the winner of Miss International 2012 Ikumi Yoshimatsu of Japan did not crown her successor; instead Miss International 2008 Alejandra Andreu took over in passing on the crown to Bea Santiago of the Philippines. This is also the first time when a past winner crowned two Miss Internationals, one in 2009 where she crowned her successor, Anagabriela Espinoza of Mexico.

== See also ==
- Miss Universe Japan
- Miss World Japan
- Miss Earth Japan
- Miss Japan
- Miss Nippon
