= Arisa Nakagawa =

Japanese beauty pageant contestant

Nakagawa Arisa
- Born: Tokyo, Japan
- Height: 1.72 m (5 ft 7 1/2 in)
- Beauty pageant titleholder
- Title: Miss International Japan 2015 (Winner)
- Hair color: Black
- Eye color: Brown
- Major competitions: Miss International 2015 (Best National Costume)

Arisa Nakagawa (中川 愛理沙, Nakagawa Arisa) is a Japanese model and beauty pageant titleholder who won the title of Miss International Japan 2015. She represented Japan in Miss International 2015 in Tokyo, Japan.

Awards and achievements
Preceded by Rira Hongo	Miss International Japan; 2015	Succeeded by Junna Yamagata
