= Miss Internacional Italia =

Italian beauty contest

- Formation: 2008
- Type: Beauty pageant
- Headquarters: Rome
- Location: Italy
- Members: Miss International
- Official language: Italian
- Owner: Devis Paganelli
- Website: Official website

Miss Internacional Italia or "Miss International Italy" is an Italian beauty pageant in Italy that selects the Italian representative for the Miss International pageant. The pageant was first organized in 2008 and it is unrelated to Miss Italy or Miss Universo Italia, although some delegates have crossed over from one format to the other throughout the years.

== History ==
Italy started to compete in 1960 until 1992 with Nicole Cinquetti as the last representative. Between 1993 and 2007, Italy did not compete at the Miss International. Begin in 2008 with Luna Voce as the first winner in that year, Italy starts to compete again. Prior to create Miss International Italia pageant, the candidate picked from Miss Italy Runner-up.

== Titleholders ==
Year	Miss International Italia	Province	Placement	Special Awards
2008	Luna Voce	Calabria	Unplaced	
2010	Veronica Tiziani Iafelice	Emilia-Romagna	Unplaced	
2011	Anthea Luca	Emilia-Romagna	Unplaced	
2012	Giulia Masala	Sardinia	Unplaced	
2013	Sara Cavagnari	Emilia-Romagna	Unplaced	
2014	Giulia Brazzarola	Veneto	Unplaced	
2015	Valentina Paganotto	Piedmont	Unplaced	
2019	Francesca Giordano	Lazio	Unplaced	
2022	Beatrice Nardi	Lazio	Unplaced	
2024	Eva Shostak	Viterbo	Unplaced	
2025	Egle Fruttauro	Campania	Unplaced	
2026	Simona Fruttauro	Campania	TBA	

== Notes ==
- 1965: Faida Fagioli became the best representative ever in Miss International history from Italy with the highest placement in 2nd Runner-up.
- 2009: Miss International Italia pageant did not held anymore, due to lack sponsorships.
- 2013: Luna Voce won the title of Miss Universo Italia 2013 and competed at the Miss Universe 2013 in Moscow, Russia.

== See also ==
- Miss Italy
- Miss Universo Italia
- Miss World Italy
