= Miss International 2015 =

55th Miss International pageant

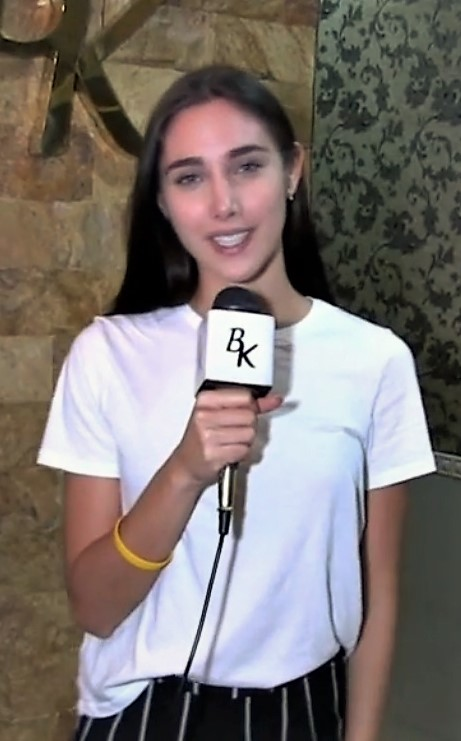
- Edymar Martinez
- Date: November 5, 2015
- Presenters: Tetsuya Bessho; Chisato Kaiho
- Venue: Grand Prince Hotel Takanawa, Tokyo, Japan
- Broadcaster: UStream; PlayStation Network
- Entrants: 70
- Placements: 10
- Withdrawals: Armenia; Chile; Curaçao; Egypt; Estonia; Gabon; Georgia; Germany; Guatemala; Guyana; Israel; Serbia; Sweden
- Returns: Costa Rica; Denmark; Guadeloupe; Guam; Hawaii; Kenya; Luxembourg; Moldova; Northern Mariana Islands; Tunisia
- Winner: Edymar Martínez; Venezuela
- Best National Costume: Arisa Nakagawa; Japan

Miss International 2015 was the 55th Miss International pageant, held at the Grand Prince Hotel Takanawa in Tokyo, Japan, on November 5, 2015.

Valerie Hernandez of Puerto Rico crowned Edymar Martínez of Venezuela as her successor at the end of the event. New crown created and designed by Mikimoto was introduced. The Continental Queens were awarded for the first time in this edition.

== Contestants ==
70 delegates competed in the final night of Miss International 2015.

| Country/Territory | Contestant | Age | Hometown | Continent |
|---|---|---|---|---|
| Argentina | Helena Zuiani | 19 | Córdoba | Americas |
| Aruba | Laura Marcela Ruiz | 23 | Oranjestad | Americas |
| Australia | Larissa Hlinovsky | 26 | Brisbane | Oceania |
| Belarus | Alena Savchuk | 26 | Minsk | Europe |
| Belgium | Elda Nushi | 20 | Brussels | Europe |
| Bolivia | Alejandra Panozo | 23 | Cochabamba | Americas |
| Brazil | Isis Stocco | 23 | Maringá | Americas |
| Canada | Kathryn Kohut | 25 | Wetaskiwin | Americas |
| China | Liu Xinyue | 19 | Shangqiu | Asia |
| Colombia | Natalia Ochoa | 22 | Medellín | Americas |
| Costa Rica | Melania González | 25 | San José | Americas |
| Cuba | Heidy Fass | 22 | Havana | Americas |
| Denmark | Mette Riis Sørensen | 25 | Copenhagen | Europe |
| Dominican Republic | Irina Peguero | 22 | Salvaleón de Higüey | Americas |
| Ecuador | Daniela Armijos | 20 | Cuenca | Americas |
| El Salvador | Eugenia Avalos | 21 | San Salvador | Americas |
| Finland | Saara Ahlberg | 19 | Helsinki | Europe |
| France | Charlotte Pirroni | 22 | Roquebrune-Cap-Martin | Europe |
| Gibraltar | Bianca Pisharello | 22 | Gibraltar | Europe |
| Guadeloupe | Juliette Alimanda | 21 | Les Abymes | Americas |
| Guam | Loriann Rabe | 26 | Hagåtña | Oceania |
| Haiti | Marie Vyannie Manard | 24 | Port-au-Prince | Americas |
| Hawaii | Brianna Acosta | 24 | Waialua | Oceania |
| Honduras | Jennifer Valle | 20 | Copan | Americas |
| Hong Kong | Sabrina Yeung | 22 | Kowloon | Asia |
| Hungary | Linda Szunai | 22 | Nagykovácsi | Europe |
| India | Ayeesha Aiman | 25 | Nawada | Asia |
| Indonesia | Chintya Fabyola | 20 | Pontianak | Asia |
| Italy | Valentina Paganotto | 19 | Turin | Europe |
| Japan | Arisa Nakagawa | 19 | Tokyo | Asia |
| Kenya | Eunice Onyango | 22 | Nairobi | Africa |
| Lebanon | Cynthia Farah | 21 | Beirut | Asia |
| Luxembourg | Natascha Bintz | 25 | Luxembourg City | Europe |
| Macau | Ana Choi | 24 | Macau | Asia |
| Malaysia | Immaculate Lojuki | 21 | Kota Kinabalu | Asia |
| Mauritius | Anoushka Ah Keng | 20 | Port Louis | Africa |
| Mexico | Lorena Sevilla | 24 | Colima | Americas |
| Moldova | Anastasia Fotachi | 20 | Chişinău | Europe |
| Mongolia | Azzaya Tsogt-Ochir | 20 | Ulaanbaatar | Asia |
| Myanmar | Emerald Nyein | 22 | Yangon | Asia |
| Nepal | Medha Koirala | 20 | Biratnagar | Asia |
| Netherlands | Rachel Van Der Meulen | 21 | Enschede | Europe |
| New Zealand | Hayley Rose Coombe | 23 | Palmerston North | Oceania |
| Nicaragua | Yaoska Ruiz | 19 | Managua | Americas |
| Northern Mariana Islands | Jian Joyner | 21 | Saipan | Oceania |
| Norway | Cecilie Andrea Røising | 18 | Sarpsborg | Europe |
| Panama | Jhasmeiry Herrera Evans | 20 | Colón | Americas |
| Paraguay | Mónica Mariani Pascualoto | 22 | Katueté | Americas |
| Peru | Cynthia Lucia Toth Montoro | 23 | Piura | Americas |
| Philippines | Janicel Lubina | 20 | Narra | Asia |
| Poland | Ewa Mielnicka | 23 | Warsaw | Europe |
| Portugal | Isabel Vieira | 22 | Lisbon | Europe |
| Puerto Rico | Wilmary Monción Román | 24 | Salinas | Americas |
| Romania | Andreea Chiru | 23 | Bucharest | Europe |
| Russia | Valeria Kufterina | 22 | Saint Petersburg | Europe |
| Singapore | Roxanne Zhang | 23 | Singapore | Asia |
| Slovak Republic | Barbora Bakošová | 19 | Bratislava | Europe |
| South Korea | Park Ah-reum | 24 | Daegu | Asia |
| Spain | Christina Silva Cano | 22 | Seville | Europe |
| Sri Lanka | Angela Jayatissa | 24 | Kurunegala | Asia |
| Taiwan | Yan Chen Ning | 26 | Taichung | Asia |
| Thailand | Sasi Sintawee | 20 | Songkhla | Asia |
| Tunisia | Wahiba Arres | 21 | Bizerte | Africa |
| Turkey | Berfu Yıldız | 20 | İzmit | Europe |
| Ukraine | Nina Goryniuk | 21 | Lviv | Europe |
| United Kingdom | Sophie Loudon | 22 | Glasgow | Europe |
| United States | Lindsay Becker | 25 | Apple Valley | Americas |
| Venezuela | Edymar Martínez | 20 | Puerto La Cruz | Americas |
| Vietnam | Phạm Hồng Thúy Vân | 22 | Ho Chi Minh City | Asia |
| Zambia | Brandina Lubuli | 20 | Mufulira | Africa |

== Notes ==
=== Returns ===
Countries and territories when previously withdraw and return this year:

- Last competed in 2009:
  - Moldova
  - Northern Mariana Islands
- Last competed in 2010:
  - Kenya
- Last competed in 2011:
  - Hawaii
- Last competed in 2012:
  - Denmark
- Last competed in 2013:
  - Costa Rica
  - Guadeloupe
  - Guam
  - Luxembourg
  - Tunisia

=== Designations ===
- Brazil – Isis Stocco was appointed "Miss International Brazil 2015". She was third runner-up Miss Brasil 2013.
- Hawaii – Brianna Acosta was appointed "Miss Hawaii International 2015" by the Miss Hawaii International Organization under Harrison Productions LLC. She was Miss Hawaii USA 2013. Hawaiian representative attends as Miss Hawaii (special region of Miss International).
- Honduras – Jennifer Valle was appointed "Miss International Honduras 2015" by Senorita Honduras Organization. She was Senorita Honduras 2012.
- Hungary – Linda Szunai was appointed "Miss International Hungary 2015" by Miss International Hungary Organization. She was Miss World Hungary 2011.
- Panama – Jhasmeiry Evans was appointed "Miss International Panama 2015" by Olais Padilla, National Director of Miss International Panama. She was second runner-up at Miss Panama 2015.
- Poland – Ewa Mielnicka was appointed "Miss International Poland 2015" by the Miss Polski Organization. Up to now, the Miss International franchise belonged to Miss Polonia, whereas Miss Polski used to send Polish delegates to Miss World between 2007 and 2014.
- Sri Lanka – Angela Jayatissa was appointed "Miss International Sri Lanka 2015" by the Miss Sri Lanka Organization. She was second runner-up at Miss Sri Lanka 2011.

=== Withdrawals ===
- Armenia – No contest
- Chile – No contest
- Curaçao – No contest
- Egypt – Miss Egypt was postponed, Miss International Egypt will compete in 2018.
- Estonia – No contest
- Gabon – Due to organizational issues. Anis Christine Pitty Yaya withdrew from Miss International.
- Georgia – No contest
- Germany – No contest
- Guatemala – For personal reasons, Saida Jerónimo did not complete.
- Guyana – No contest
- Israel – Due to lack of sponsorship.
- Serbia – Due to lack of sponsorship.
