= Miss International 2017 =

57th Miss International pageant

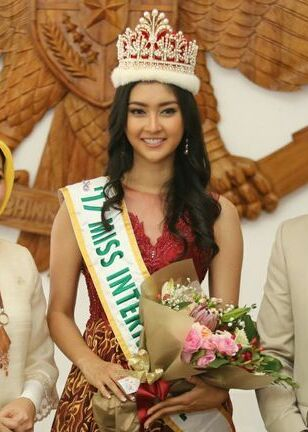
- Miss International 2017, Kevin Junaedy
- Date: November 14, 2017
- Presenters: Tetsuya Bessho; Amy Ota
- Entertainment: Chemistry; StarLights
- Venue: Tokyo Dome City, Tokyo, Japan
- Broadcaster: Host Broadcaster: Ustream; PlayStation Network; YouTube; Indosiar; Panamericana Televisión; NHK; Co-host Broadcaster: TV Tokyo
- Entrants: 69
- Placements: 15
- Debuts: Cambodia; Cook Islands; Laos
- Withdrawals: Argentina; Aruba; Cuba; Denmark; Guam; Ireland; Nigeria; Northern Mariana Islands; Puerto Rico; Sri Lanka
- Returns: Chile; Curaçao; Czech Republic; Ethiopia; Lithuania; Mongolia; Paraguay
- Winner: Kevin Lilliana Junaedy; Indonesia

Miss International 2017, the 57th Miss International pageant, was held on November 14, 2017 at Tokyo Dome City Hall in Tokyo, Japan. Kylie Verzosa of the Philippines crowned her successor Kevin Lilliana Junaedy of Indonesia at the end of the event. This edition also saw the crowning of the first ever Muslim women to win Miss International, and was the first to win one of the four major international pageants for Indonesia.

The show was hosted by Tetsuya Bessho on his fourth consecutive year. Amy Ota co-hosted the event, with a performance by Chemistry. This is the second time in Miss International history that the finals night saw the return of the previous year's runners-up to crown their respective successors.

== Background ==
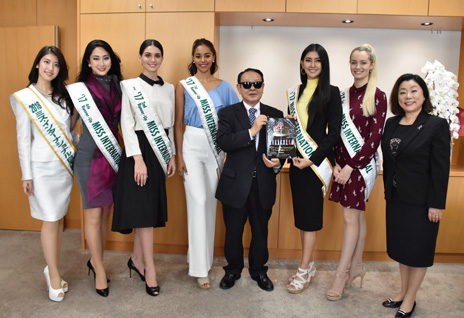
Kevin Lilliana Junaedy after crowning, together with Madame Akemi Shimomura, Fumiaki Matsumoto and the top 5 finalists.

On April 4, 2017, it was announced during a broadcast conference by Akemi Shimomura, president of the International Cultural Association, that the 2017 pageant would be held in Tokyo Dome City Hall, Tokyo, Japan for the second consecutive year on Tuesday, November 14, 2017.

The 2017 edition saw the debuts of Cambodia, Cook Islands and Laos; and the returns of Ethiopia, which last competed in 2009, the Czech Republic in 2010, Lithuania in 2013, Chile and Curaçao in 2014, Mongolia and Paraguay in 2015. Argentina, Aruba, Cuba, Denmark, Guam, Ireland, Nigeria, Northern Mariana Islands, Puerto Rico and Sri Lanka, withdrew from the competition for unknown reasons.

== Results ==
=== Placements ===
Placement	Contestant
Miss International 2017	Indonesia – Kevin Lilliana Junaedy
1st Runner-Up	Curaçao – Chanelle de Lau
2nd Runner-Up	Venezuela – Diana Croce
3rd Runner-Up	Australia – Amber Dew
4th Runner-Up	Japan – Natsuki Tsutsui
Top 8	Ecuador – Jocelyn Mieles; Laos – Phounesup Phonyotha; United Kingdom – Ashley Powell
Top 15	Finland – Pihla Koivuniemi; Ghana – Daniella Akorfa Awuma; Honduras – Vanessa Villars; Panama – Darelys Santos; Slovakia – Petra Varaliová; South Africa – Tayla Skye Robinson; Thailand – Ratiyaporn Chookaew

== Contestants ==
69 contestants competed for the title of Miss International 2017:

Country/Territory	Contestant	Age	Hometown	Continental Group
Australia	Amber Dew	21	Melbourne	Oceania
Belarus	Polina Pimahina (Note: BELARUS – Polina Pimakhina was appointed Miss International Belarus 2017 by Olga Serejnikova, the national director of Miss Belarus pageant. Polina was crowned Miss Supranational Belarus 2016 and was among the Top 25 at Miss Supranational 2016 pageant, also was among the Top 6 at Top Model of the World 2017.)	20	Minsk	Europe
Belgium	Virginie Philippot	24	Brussels	Europe
Bolivia	Carla Maldonado	22	Camiri	Americas
Brazil	Bruna Zanardo	25	Laranjal Paulista	Americas
Cambodia	Nheat Sophea	19	Phnom Penh	Asia
Canada	Marta Stępień	23	Windsor	Americas
Chile	Estefanía Galeota	20	Coquimbo	Americas
China	Jia Shi	23	Jiangsu	Asia
Colombia	Vanessa Pulgarin	25	Medellín	Americas
Cook Islands	Silas Tuaputa	21	Avarua	Oceania
Costa Rica	Paola Chacón	26	San José	Americas
Curaçao	Chanelle de Lau (Note: CURAÇAO – Chanelle de Lau was appointed Miss International Curaçao 2017 by Chris Puesan, the new national director of Miss International Curaçao Organization after three years of absence because unclear reason and was acquired the Miss International new franchise owner pageant for Curaçao. Chanelle was crowned Miss Curaçao 2016 and was failed to placed at Miss Universe 2016.)	22	Willemstad	Americas
Czech Republic	Alice Činčurová	21	Prague	Europe
Dominican Republic	Jennifer Valdez	19	Pedernales	Americas
Ecuador	Jocelyn Mieles	22	Manta	Americas
El Salvador	Fátima Mangandi	25	San Salvador	Americas
Ethiopia	Bamlak Dereje	20	Addis Ababa	Africa
Finland	Pihla Koivuniemi	22	Tampere	Europe
France	Maëva Balan	24	Challans	Europe
Ghana	Daniella Akorfa Awuma	24	Accra	Africa
(United Kingdom) Gibraltar	Tessa Britto	21	Gibraltar	Europe
(France) Guadeloupe	Clotilde Stressais	19	Basse-Terre	Americas
Guatemala	Ana Lucía Villagran	24	Guatemala City	Americas
Haiti	Caroline Minerve	22	Port-au-Prince	Americas
(United States) Hawaii	Courtney Coleman	23	Honolulu	Oceania
Honduras	Vanessa Villars	19	Tegucigalpa	Americas
(China) Hong Kong	Wing Wong	23	Hong Kong	Asia
Hungary	Rebeka Hartó	21	Budapest	Europe
India	Ankita Kumari	22	Jharkhand	Asia
Indonesia	Kevin Lilliana Junaedy	21	Bandung	Asia
Japan	Natsuki Tsutsui	23	Saitama	Asia
Laos	Phounesup Phonnyotha	20	Vientiane Prefecture	Asia
Lebanon	Dima Safi	24	Beirut	Asia
Lithuania	Patricija Belousova	22	Vilnius	Europe
Macau	Sofia Paiva	20	Taipa	Asia
Malaysia	Annie Wong Wei Wei	20	Sibu	Asia
Mauritius	Laetitia Begue	21	Triolet	Africa
Mexico	Citlaly Higuera	22	Ciudad Madero	Americas
Moldova	Daniela Bejan	22	Cahul	Europe
Mongolia	Saikhantamir Amarsanaa	22	Ulaanbaatar	Asia
Myanmar	Sao Yoon Wadi Oo	25	Taunggyi	Asia
Nepal	Niti Shah	21	Ghorahi	Asia
Netherlands	Nathalie Mogbelzada	20	Amsterdam	Europe
New Zealand	Michelle Isemonger	19	Auckland	Oceania
Nicaragua	Helen Martínez	22	Matagalpa	Americas
Norway	Vilde Andresen Bø	20	Tønsberg	Europe
Panama	Darelys Santos (Note: PANAMA – Darelys Santos was appointed to represent Panama by Justine Pasek, a national director of Señorita Panamá for franchise holder of Miss International pageant. Santos crowned the 1st Runner-Up at the Señorita Panamá 2017 pageant.)	23	Panama City	Americas
Paraguay	Tatiana Rolín	25	Obligado	Americas
Peru	Tiffany López Borjas	23	Lima	Americas
Philippines	Mariel de Leon	23	Las Piñas	Asia
Poland	Paulina Maziarz	20	Zwoleń	Europe
Portugal	Ana Marques	19	Lisbon	Europe
Russia	Elena Kviatkevich	20	Saint Petersburg	Europe
Sierra Leone	Leone Abie Mansaray	22	Freetown	Africa
Singapore	Kylie Yeo	23	Singapore	Asia
Slovakia	Petra Varaliová	19	Bardejov	Europe
South Africa	Tayla Skye Robinson	22	Johannesburg	Africa
South Korea	Seung Woo Nam	25	Seoul	Asia
Spain	Elizabeth Ledesma	18	Tenerife	Europe
Sweden	Lina Ljungberg	20	Norrköping	Europe
Taiwan	Xie Lingci	25	Taipei	Asia
Thailand	Ratiyaporn Chookaew (Note: THAILAND – Ratiyaporn Chookaew was appointed to represent Thailand at the Miss International 2017 pageant, by Pawina Bumrungrot, National Director of ERM Marketing Co., Ltd. Ratiyaporn was place the Top 10 at the Miss Grand Thailand 2017 pageant.)	19	Songkhla	Asia
Tunisia	Khaoula Gueye	23	Kasserine	Africa
Ukraine	Kseniya Chifa	24	Zaporizhia	Europe
United Kingdom	Ashley Powell	22	London	Europe
United States	Shanel James	25	Baltimore	Americas
Venezuela	Diana Croce	20	Calabozo	Americas
Vietnam	Huỳnh Thị Thuỳ Dung (Note: VIETNAM – Huỳnh Thị Thùy Dung was appointed to represent Vietnam by Elite Models Vietnam, an franchise holder of Miss International pageant in Vietnam. Dung crowned the 2nd Runner-Up at the Miss Vietnam 2016 pageant.)	21	Ho Chi Minh City	Asia

== Notes ==
=== Debuts ===
- Cambodia
- Cook Islands
- Laos

=== Returns ===
Last competed in 2009:

- Ethiopia

Last competed in 2010:

- Czech Republic

Last competed in 2013:

- Lithuania

Last competed in 2014:

- Chile
- Curacao

Last competed in 2015:

- Mongolia
- Paraguay

== General references ==
- "Miss International 2017". miss-international.org. Miss International Beauty Pageant.
