= Miss International 2014 =

54th Miss International competition, beauty pageant edition

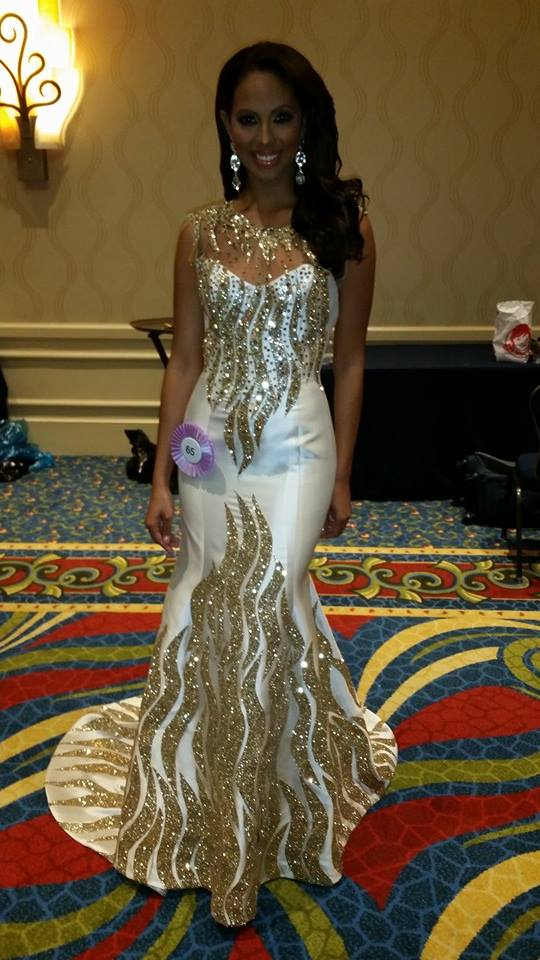
- Miss International 2014, Valerie Hernandez
- Date: November 11, 2014
- Presenters: Tetsuya Bessho; Kei Fujimoto
- Venue: Grand Prince Hotel Takanawa, Tokyo, Japan
- Broadcaster: UStream; PlayStation Network
- Entrants: 73
- Placements: 10
- Withdrawals: Costa Rica; Guadeloupe; Guam; Iceland; Kyrgyzstan; Lithuania; Luxembourg; South Africa; South Sudan; Suriname; Tahiti; Tunisia
- Returns: Argentina; Armenia; Belarus; Chile; Cuba; Curaçao; Egypt; France; Georgia; Guyana; Honduras; Israel; Mauritius; Norway; Serbia; Sri Lanka; Turkey; Zambia
- Winner: Valerie Hernandez; Puerto Rico

Miss International 2014 was the 54th Miss International pageant, held at the Grand Prince Hotel Takanawa in Tokyo, Japan, on November 11, 2014. It was organized by the International Cultural Association.

Bea Santiago of the Philippines crowned Valerie Hernández of Puerto Rico as her successor at the end of the event.

Miss International beauty pageant is aimed at promoting "Love Peace and Excitement to the World". The contestants of the pageant are expected to serve as "Ambassadors of Peace and Beauty", serving tenderness, generosity, friendship, beauty, intelligence and a great international sensibility.

== Background ==
On January 25, 2014, it was announced by Akemi Shimomura, this is the first consecutive year that the 2014 pageant will be held in Grand Prince Hotel Takanawa, Tokyo, Japan on Tuesday, November 11, 2014.

== Results ==
| Placement | Contestant |
|---|---|
| Miss International 2014 | Puerto Rico – Valerie Hernández |
| 1st runner-up | Colombia – Zuleika Suárez |
| 2nd runner-up | Thailand – Punika Kulsoontornrut |
| 3rd runner-up | United Kingdom – Victoria Tooby |
| 4th runner-up | Finland – Milla Romppanen |
| Top 10 | Argentina – Josefina José Herrero; Brazil – Deise Benício; Indonesia – Elfin Pertiwi Rappa; Mexico – Vianey Vázquez; Panama – Aileen Bernal |

== Contestants ==
| Country/Territory | Contestant | Age | Hometown | Continental Group |
|---|---|---|---|---|
| Argentina | Josefina José Herrero | 19 | Mercedes | Americas |
| Armenia | Shushanik Yeritsyan | 19 | Yerevan | Europe |
| Aruba | Francis Massiel Sousa | 20 | Oranjestad | Americas |
| Australia | Bridgette-Rose Taylor | 24 | Melbourne | Oceania |
| Belarus | Natallia Bryshten | 21 | Minsk | Europe |
| Belgium | Gonul Meral | 25 | Brussels | Europe |
| Bolivia | Joselyn Toro Leigue | 20 | Santa Cruz | Americas |
| Brazil | Deise Benício | 23 | São Gonçalo do Amarante | Americas |
| Canada | Kesiah Papasin | 23 | Toronto | Americas |
| Chile | Tania Dahuabe | 21 | Santiago | Americas |
| China | Lisi Wei | 24 | Inner Mongolia | Asia |
| Colombia | Zuleika Suárez | 20 | San Andrés Island | Americas |
| Cuba | Adisleydi Alonso Rodriguez | 24 | Havana | Americas |
| Curaçao | Chimay Damiany Ramos | 21 | Willemstad | Americas |
| Dominican Republic | Bárbara Santana | 21 | New York City | Americas |
| Ecuador | Carla Prado | 19 | Salinas | Americas |
| Egypt | Perihan Fateen | 19 | Cairo | Africa |
| El Salvador | Idubina Rivas | 20 | San Salvador | Americas |
| Estonia | Birgit Konsin | 22 | Tallinn | Europe |
| Finland | Milla Romppanen | 21 | Kuopio | Europe |
| France | Aurianne Sinacola | 20 | Vallauris | Europe |
| Gabon | Maggaly Nguema | 22 | Libreville | Africa |
| (Georgia (country)) Georgia | Inga Tsaturiani | 25 | Tbilisi | Europe |
| Germany | Katharina Rodin | 18 | Frankfurt | Europe |
| Gibraltar | Kristy Torres | 23 | Gibraltar | Europe |
| Guatemala | Claudia María Herrera Morales | 21 | Guatemala City | Americas |
| Guyana | Ruqayyah Boyer | 24 | Georgetown | Americas |
| Haiti | Christie Désir | 22 | Port-au-Prince | Americas |
| Honduras | Mónica Brocato | 18 | Omoa | Americas |
| Hong Kong | Katherine Yim Kuen Ho | 22 | Hong Kong | Asia |
| Hungary | Dalma Kármán | 17 | Tápióbicske | Europe |
| India | Jhataleka Malhotra | 20 | Mumbai | Asia |
| Indonesia | Elfin Pertiwi Rappa | 18 | Palembang | Asia |
| Israel | Shani Hazan | 21 | Kiryat Ata | Asia |
| Italy | Giulia Brazzarola | 21 | Schio | Europe |
| Japan | Rira Hongo | 20 | Tokyo | Asia |
| Lebanon | Lia Saad | 19 | Beirut | Asia |
| Macau | Hio Man Chan | 19 | Macau | Asia |
| Malaysia | Rubini Sambanthan | 23 | Selangor | Asia |
| Mauritius | Shiksha Matabadul | 20 | Port Louis | Africa |
| Mexico | Vianey Vázquez | 19 | Aguascalientes | Americas |
| Mongolia | Bayartsetseg Altangerel | 23 | Ulan Bator | Asia |
| Myanmar | May Barani Thaw | 23 | Yangon | Asia |
| Nepal | Sonie Rajbhandari | 24 | Gandaki | Asia |
| Netherlands | Shauny Built | 23 | Boxtel | Europe |
| New Zealand | Rachel Harradence | 24 | Auckland | Oceania |
| Nicaragua | Jeimmy Garcia | 25 | Rivas | Americas |
| Norway | Thea Cecilie Nordal Bull | 20 | Tønsberg | Europe |
| Panama | Aileen Bernal | 19 | Los Santos | Americas |
| Paraguay | Jéssica Servín | 23 | Asunción | Americas |
| Peru | Fiorella Peirano | 21 | Callao | Americas |
| Philippines | Bianca Guidotti | 25 | Taguig | Asia |
| Poland | Żaneta Płudowska | 22 | Siedlce | Europe |
| Portugal | Rafaela Pardete | 23 | Setúbal | Europe |
| Puerto Rico | Valerie Hernández | 21 | San Juan | Americas |
| Romania | Anca Francesca Neculaiasa | 19 | Buzău | Europe |
| Russia | Alina Rekko | 18 | Orel | Europe |
| Serbia | Lidija Kocić | 26 | Belgrade | Europe |
| Singapore | Vannesa Sim | 19 | Singapore | Asia |
| (Slovakia) Slovak Republic | Lucia Semankova | 22 | Bardejov | Europe |
| South Korea | Lee Seo-bin | 21 | Uiwang | Asia |
| Spain | Rocío Tormo | 21 | Barcelona | Europe |
| Sri Lanka | Tamara Shanelle Makalanda | 26 | Colombo | Asia |
| Sweden | Moa Sandberg | 18 | Stockholm | Europe |
| Taiwan | Yang Yuyao | 23 | Taipei | Asia |
| Thailand | Punika Kulsoontornrut | 22 | Prachuap Khiri Khan | Asia |
| Turkey | Hilal Yabuz | 23 | Bursa | Europe |
| Ukraine | Iana Ravlikovska | 23 | Mariupol | Europe |
| United Kingdom | Victoria Tooby | 19 | Cardiff | Europe |
| United States | Samantha Brooks | 23 | Los Angeles | Americas |
| Venezuela | Michelle Bertolini | 20 | Caracas | Americas |
| Vietnam | Đặng Thu Thảo | 19 | Cần Thơ | Asia |
| Zambia | Mercy Mukwiza | 22 | Lusaka | Africa |

== Notes ==
=== Returns ===
- Last competed in 1962:
  - Guyana
- Last competed in 2002:
  - Curaçao
- Last competed in 2007:
  - Armenia
  - Egypt
- Last competed in 2008:
  - Zambia
- Last competed in 2010:
  - Chile
  - Norway
  - Serbia
- Last competed in 2011:
  - Cuba
  - Georgia
- Last competed in 2012:
  - Argentina
  - Belarus
  - France
  - Honduras
  - Israel
  - Mauritius
  - Sri Lanka
  - Turkey

=== Withdrawals ===
- Costa Rica
- Guadeloupe
- Guam
- Iceland
- Kyrgyzstan
- Lithuania
- Luxemburg
- South Africa
- South Sudan
- Suriname
- Tahiti
- Tunisia

=== Designations ===
- Argentina – Josefina José Herrero was appointed as Miss International Argentina 2014 by Belleza Argentina Organization to mark Argentina return since in 2013 Argentina withdrew with Zaida Schoop, due to lack of funding and sponsorships to compete. Josefina was Miss Mundo Argentina 2012.
- Aruba – Francis Massiel Sousa was appointed as Miss International Aruba 2014 by Senorita Aruba Organization. This official candidate was coming from Senorita Aruba 2013 (first session). She was Senorita Aruba 2013 1st runner-up.
- Brazil – Deise Benicio is 2nd runner-up in Miss Brasil 2014.
- Canada – Kesiah Papasin was appointed as Miss International Canada 2014. She is Miss Universe Canada 2014 1st runner-up.
- Egypt – Perihan Fateen was appointed as Miss International Egypt 2014. She was a Top 10 finalist in Miss Egypt 2014.
- Georgia – Inga Tsaturiani wa appointed as Miss International Georgia 2014. She was Miss Friendship at Miss 7 Continents 2011.
- Guyana – Ruqayyah Boyer was appointed as Miss International Guyana 2014 by National Director, Natasha Martaindale to mark Guyana's return at Miss International. She was Miss Guyana 2012.
- Israel – Shani Hazan was appointed as Miss International Israel 2014 by Miss International Israel Organization. She was Miss World Israel 2012.
- Mexico – Vianey Vázquez as appointed as Miss Mexico International 2014 by Nuestra Belleza México
- Netherlands – Shauny Built was appointed as Miss International Netherlands 2014. She was Miss Earth Netherlands 2012.
- Serbia – Lidija Kocić was appointed as Miss International Serbia 2014. She was Miss Universe Serbije 2010.
- Thailand – Punika Kunsuntornrat was appointed as Miss International Thailand 2014. She was Miss Earth Thailand 2013.

=== Replacements ===
- Ecuador – Inés Panchana did not compete at Miss International, since she failed to meet the age requirements stipulated by the pageant. Carla Pardo was appointed to compete at Miss International 2014, She is Miss Ecuador 2014 2nd runner-up.
- Myanmar – The reigning Miss Myanmar International 2014, Khin Wai Phyo Han did not compete at Miss International, since she failed to meet the age requirements stipulated by the pageant. May Bayani Thaw was appointed to compete at Miss International 2014, She is Miss Myanmar International 2014 1st runner-up.
- Puerto Rico – Patricia Quiñones did not compete at Miss International, Valerie Hernandez was appointed to compete at Miss International 2014.
- Turkey – The reigning Miss International Turkey 2014, Gizem Koçak has resigned her title. Hilal Yabuz replaced Gizem for undisclosed reasons. Hilal Yabuz was appointed from the Miss Turkey 2014 Contestants selection.
