= Valerie Hernández =

Puerto Rican model

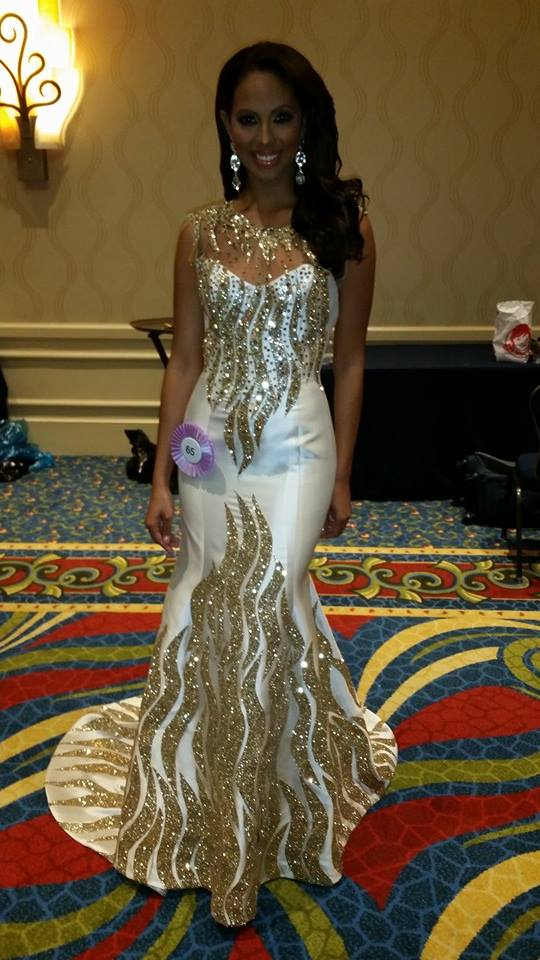
- Born: Valerie Hernández Matías; July 19, 1993 (age 33); San Juan, Puerto Rico
- Height: 1.75 m (5 ft 9 in)
- Beauty pageant titleholder
- Title: Miss Teen International 2012; Miss International Puerto Rico 2014; Miss International 2014
- Hair color: Black
- Eye color: Brown

Valerie Hernández Matías (born July 19, 1993, in San Juan) is a Puerto Rican model and beauty queen who was crowned Miss International 2014 in Tokyo, Japan. She is the second winner of the pageant from Puerto Rico after Laurie Simpson in 1987.

== Pageantry ==
=== Miss Teen International 2012 ===
Hernández was crowned Miss Teen International in 2012, she was the fourth Puerto Rican to obtain this title.

=== Miss International Puerto Rico 2014 ===
Valerie competed in Miss International Puerto Rico 2014 where she finished as the first runner-up. She later assumed the title after the original winner, Patricia Quiñones, resigned for personal reasons.

=== Miss International 2014 ===
In 2014, Hernández represented Puerto Rico at Miss International where she won the title, becoming the second Puerto Rican to win that title after Laurie Simpson in 1987.

=== Miss Universe Puerto Rico 2018 ===
On May 31, 2018, Hernández was designated as Miss Carolina Universe and was initially set to compete at Miss Universe Puerto Rico 2018 for a chance to represent the island at Miss Universe 2018 but withdrew for personal reasons.

Awards and achievements
Preceded by Tanya Romero	Miss Carolina Universe (Withdrew); 2018	Succeeded by Tanya Romero
Preceded by (Philippines) Bea Santiago	Miss International; 2014	Succeeded by (Venezuela) Edymar Martínez
Preceded by Ashley Beth Pérez	Miss Puerto Rico International; 2014	Succeeded by Wilmary Monción
Preceded by (Nicaragua) Adriana Paniagua	Miss Teen International; 2012	Succeeded by (Brazil) Isabella Menin
Preceded by Rebeca Valentín García	Miss Teen Puerto Rico; 2012	Succeeded by Caroline González Torres
