= Grand Prince Hotel Takanawa =

Building in Minato-ku, Tokyo, Japan

Coordinates: 35.6315°N 139.734997°E

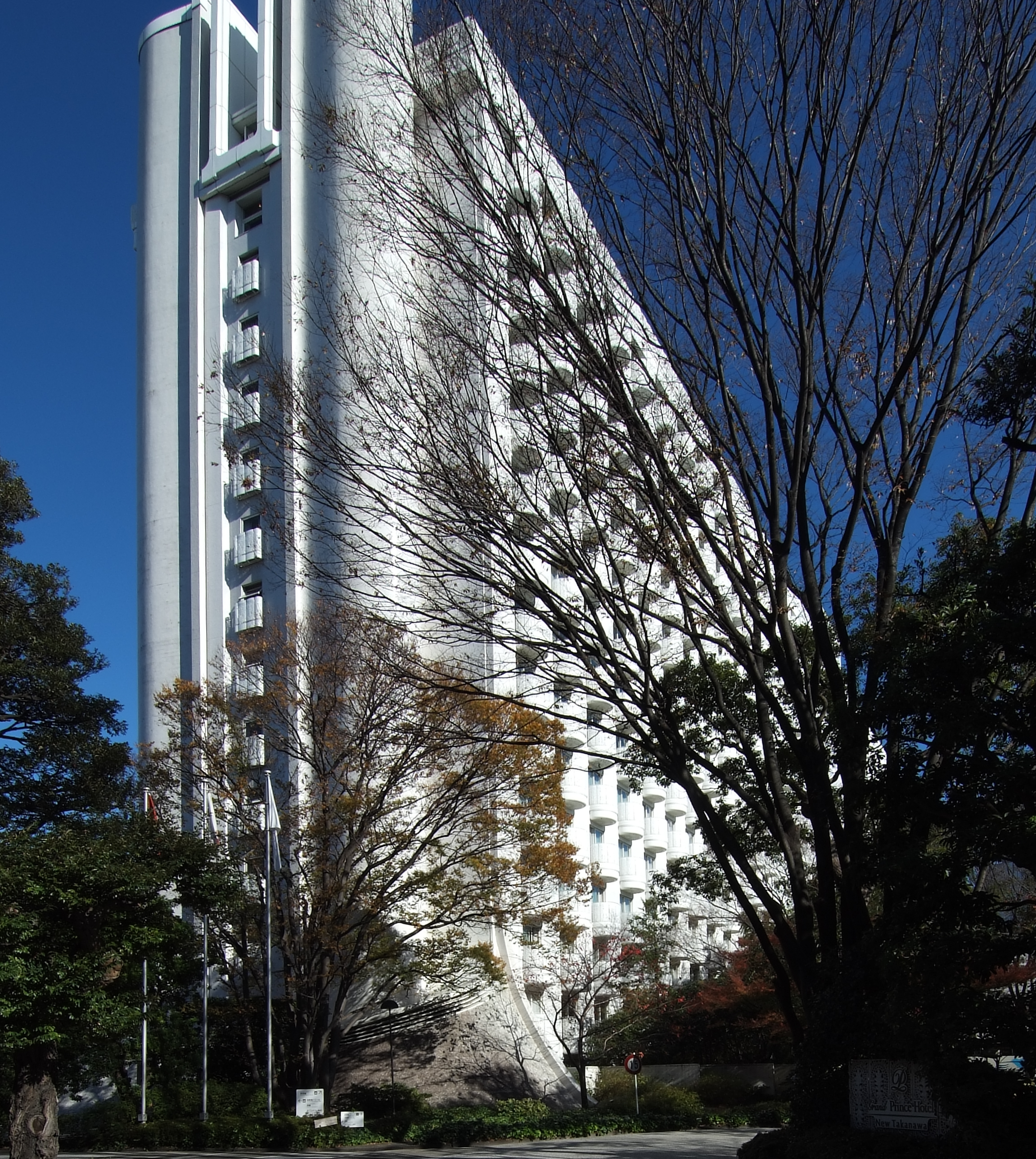
Grand Prince Hotel Shin Takanawa, designed by Togo Murano in 1982.

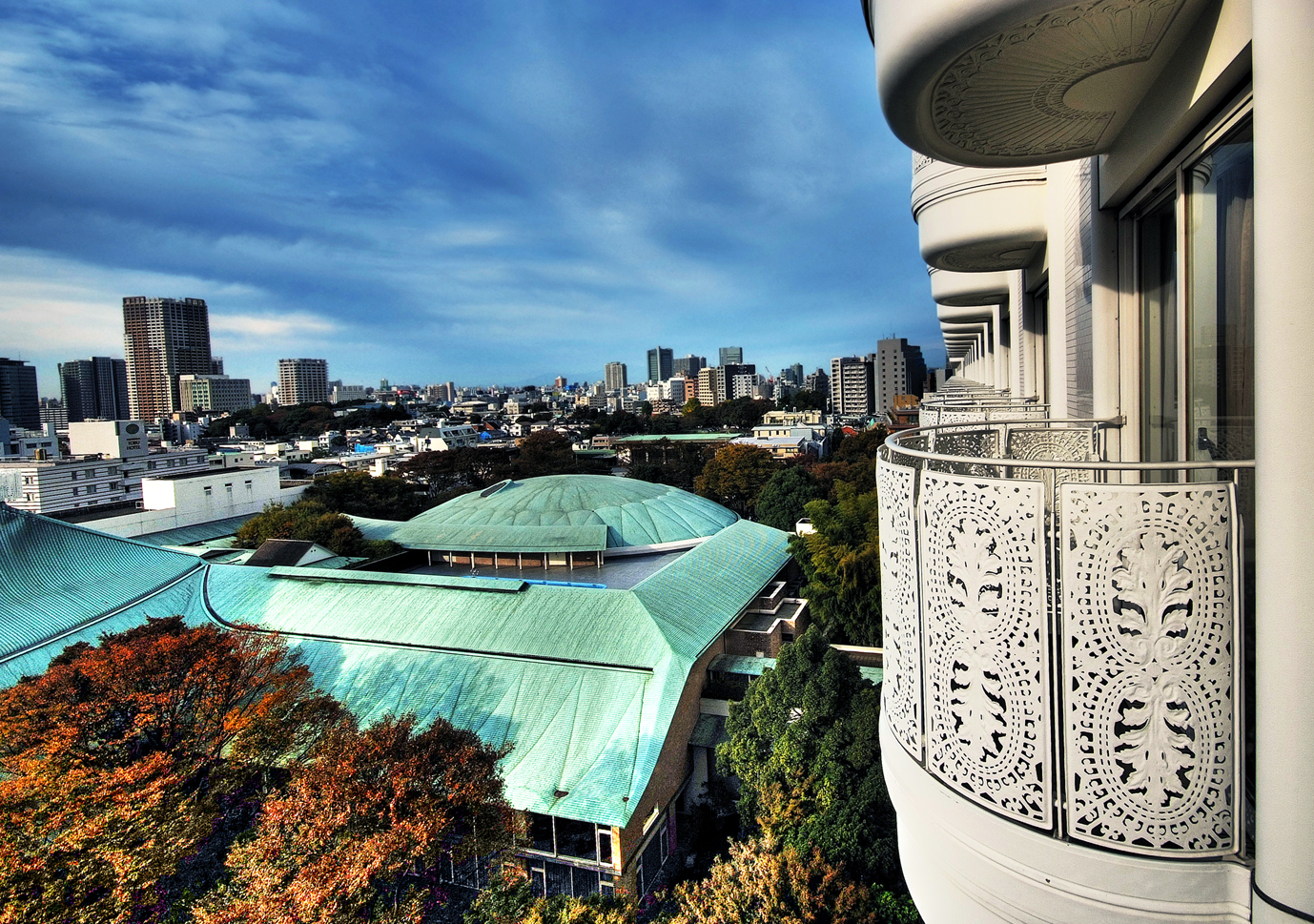
An aerial view from a hotel room balcony of New Takanawa.

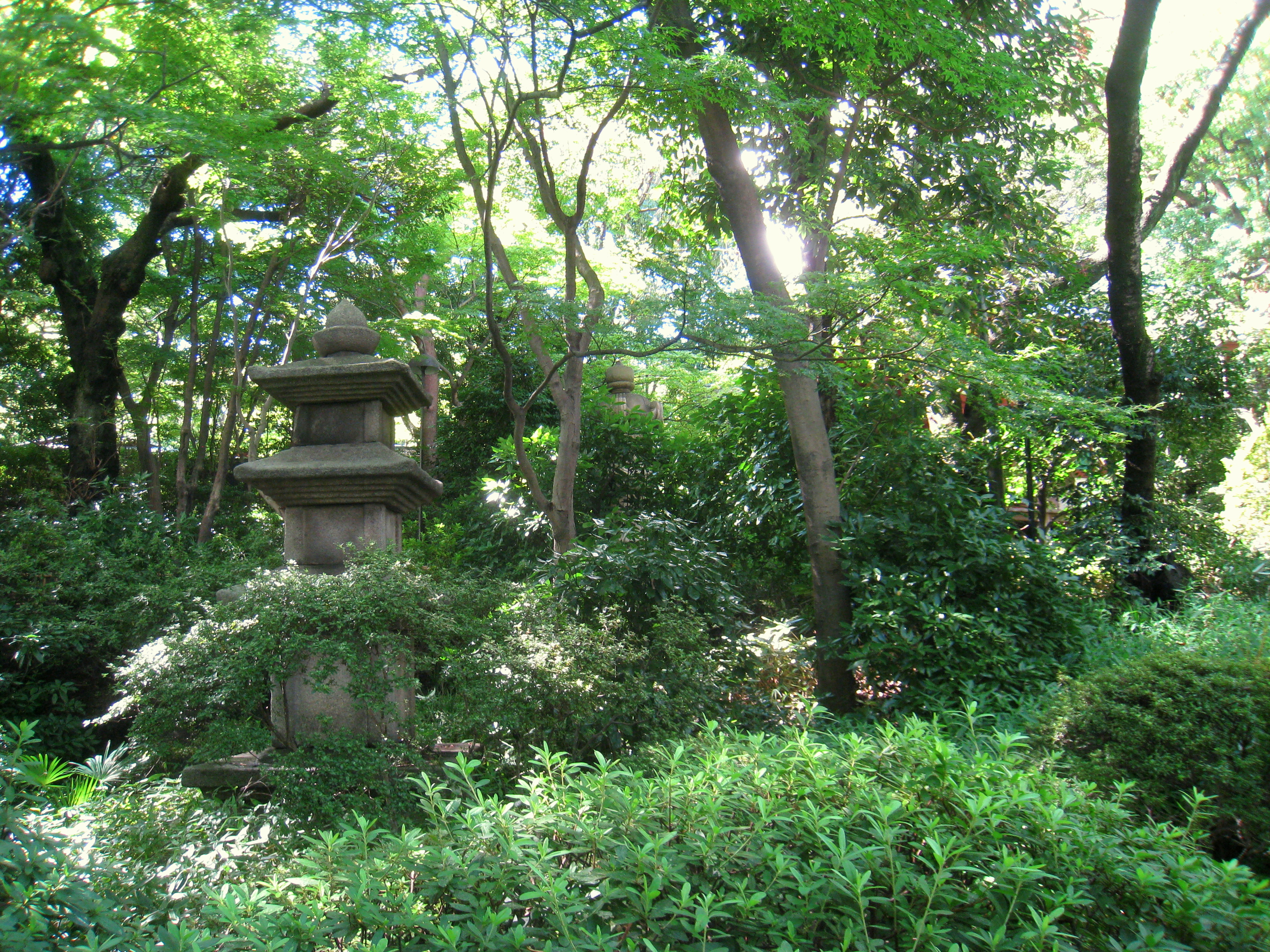
Garden of the Grand Prince Hotel Takanawa

The Grand Prince Hotel Takanawa (グランドプリンスホテル高輪) is a complex of three hotels (Grand Prince Hotel Takanawa, Grand Prince Hotel Shin Takanawa, and The Prince Sakura Tower Tokyo, Autograph Collection) designed by architect Togo Murano in 1982, and situated in the Takanawa district of Minato, Tokyo, Japan. The hotel was originally established as the Takanawa Prince Hotel in 1953.

The three hotels, effectively managed as one, are situated in a 10-acre (40,000 m^{2}) garden which formerly belonged to Takeda Palace of Prince Tsuneyoshi Takeda, a member of the Japanese Imperial Family.

The hotels are the flagship properties of the Prince Hotels group which has a recently checkered history due to events at its corporate parent, Seibu Corporation, an affiliate of Seibu Railway and its former chairman Yoshiaki Tsutsumi.
