= Miss International Belgium =

Beauty pageant

Miss International Belgium Miss Toerisme Benelux
- Formation: 2012
- Type: Beauty pageant
- Headquarters: Brussels
- Location: Belgium
- Members: Miss International
- Official language: Dutch
- National Director: Katia Maes
- Website: missitems.be

The Miss International Belgium (Known as Miss Belgium International) is a beauty pageant which selects Miss Belgium to the Miss International pageant.

== History ==
Belgium was debuted at the Miss International beauty pageant in 1960 by Miss Belgium contest. In 1987 Muriel Jane Georges Rens had been successful placed as the 1st Runner-up at the Miss International 1987 in Tokyo, Japan where Laurie Simpson of Puerto Rico won the title. Between 1997 and 2007 Belgium did not exist at the pageant. In 2008 Miss Belgium Organization signed up to be National franchise holder of Miss International in Belgium again but it was run until 2010 by runner-up of Miss Belgium.

In 2012 Belgium comes from Katia Maes directorship in Miss International history. The winner of Miss International Belgium may come at the Miss International beauty pageant which mostly happens in Japan. The reigning title is expected to serve as Ambassador of Peace in Belgium.

== Titleholders ==
Year	Miss International Belgium	Province
2011	Kristina Johanna María de Munter Cavazza	Brussels
2012	Aliënatie Jacqueline Decock	Brussels
2013	Ekaterina Sarafanova	Brussels
2014	Gönül Meral	Brussels
2015	Elda Nushi	Brussels
2016	Brussels	
2017	Virginie Philippot	Brussels
2018	Kelly Quanten	Flemish Brabant
2019	Rachel Nimegeers	Antwerp
2020	Due to the impact of COVID-19 pandemic, no pageant in 2020	
2021	Due to the impact of COVID-19 pandemic, no pageant in 2021	
2022	Lore Ven	Namur
2023	Jolien Pede	Zwalm
2024	Luka Deproost	Antwerp
2025	Elizabeth Victoria Raska	Brussels
2026	Kayra Wouters	West Flanders

== International pageants ==
=== Miss International Belgium ===
Color key

- Declared as Winner
- Ended as runner-up
- Ended as one of the finalists or semifinalists

Year	Miss International Belgium	Placement at Miss International	Special Awards
1960	Caroline Lecerf	Unplaced	
1961	Jacqueline Oroi	Unplaced	
1962	Danièle Defrère	Unplaced	
1963	Monique Bourgeois	Unplaced	
1964	Eliane Stockmans	Unplaced	
1965	Monique Moret	Unplaced	
1966	Cancelled in 1966		
1967	Eliane Lambrechts	Unplaced	
1968	Janine Patteuw	Unplaced	
1969	Josyjane Minet	Unplaced	
1970	Heidi LeLeu	Unplaced	
1971	Marie-Jeanne Borra	Unplaced	
1972	Caroline A Devienne	Unplaced	
1974	Marie-Rose Pieters	Top 15	
1975	Liliane Marie Walschaers	Top 15	
1976	Beatrice Libert	Unplaced	
1977	Yvette Maria Aelbrecht	Unplaced	
1978	Brigitte Maria Antonia Muyshondt	2nd Runner-up	
1979	Françoise Helene Julia Moens	Unplaced	
1980	Ann Claude Phillipps	Unplaced	
1981	Dominique Van Eeckhoudt	Top 15	Best National Costume
1982	Mimi Dufour	Top 15	
1983	Marina De Ruyck	Top 15	
1984	An Van Den Broeck	Unplaced	
1985	Mireille Paula Baele	Unplaced	
1986	Nancy Maria Marcella Stoop	Unplaced	
1987	Muriel Jane Georges Rens	1st Runner-up	
1988	Alexandra Elisabeth Winkler	Unplaced	
1989	Violetta Blazejczak	Unplaced	
1990	Katia Alens	Top 10	
1991	Stéphanie Dermaux	Unplaced	
1992	Véronique Jacqueline De Roe	Unplaced	
1993	Christelle Roelandts	Top 10	Miss Photogenic
1995	Berenice De Bondt	Unplaced	
1996	Barbara Van der Beken	Unplaced	
2008	Charlotte Van de Vijver	Unplaced	
2009	Cassandra D’Ermilio	Top 15	
2010	Claudia Scheelen	Unplaced	
2011	Kristina Johanna María de Munter Cavazza	Unplaced	
2012	Aliënatie Jacqueline Decock	Unplaced	
2013	Ekaterina Sarafanova	Unplaced	
2014	Gönül Meral	Unplaced	
2015	Elda Nushi	Unplaced	
2016	Caroline Sophie Julie van Hoye	Unplaced	
2017	Virginie Philippot	Unplaced	
2018	Kelly Quanten	Unplaced	
2019	Rachel Nimegeers	Unplaced	
Due to the impact of COVID-19 pandemic, no pageant in 2020 and 2021
2022	Lore Ven	Unplaced	
2023	Jolien Pede	Unplaced	
2024	Luka Deproost	Unplaced	
2025	Elizabeth Victoria Raska	Unplaced	
2026	Kayra Wouters	TBA	TBA
