= Miss International 2004 =

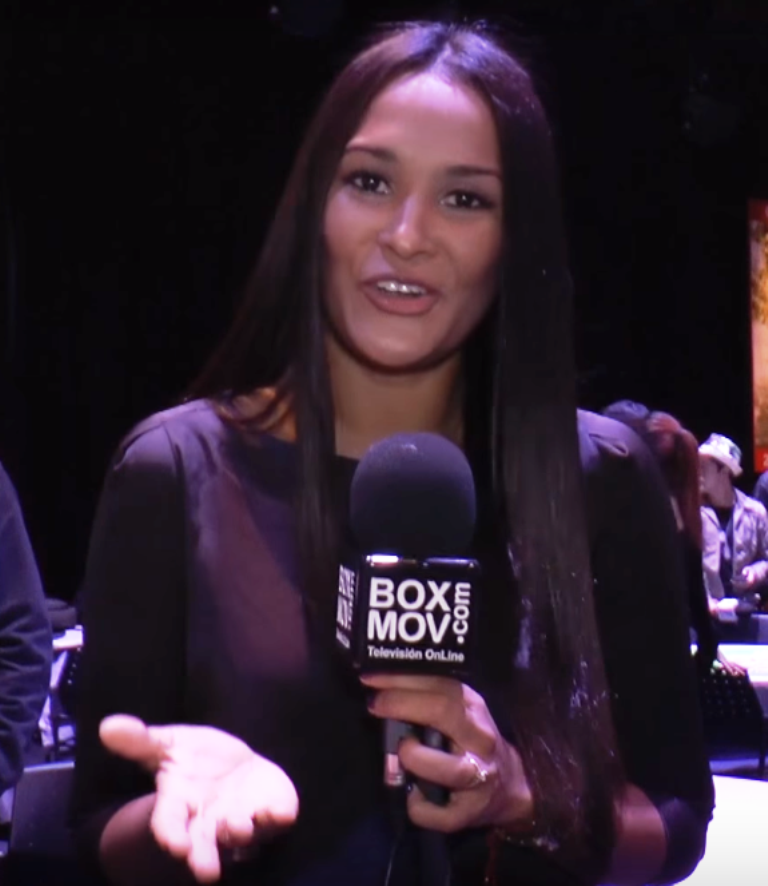
- Jeymmy Vargas, Miss International 2004
- Date: October 16, 2004
- Venue: Workers Indoor Arena, Beijing, China
- Broadcaster: TV Tokyo
- Entrants: 58
- Placements: 15
- Debuts: Angola; Romania; Zambia
- Withdrawals: Argentina; Croatia; Guatemala; Latin Mexico; Malta; Native American; Vietnam
- Returns: Australia; Bahamas; Czech Republic; Dominican Republic; Ecuador; Egypt; El Salvador; Hawaii; Hungary; Iceland; Latvia; Lebanon; Mongolia; New Caledonia; Norway; Panama; Peru; Poland; Senegal
- Winner: Jeymmy Vargas; Colombia
- Congeniality: Fu Sze-Sze; Hong Kong
- Best National Costume: Sun Yue; China
- Photogenic: Sodtuya Chadraabal; Mongolia

Miss International 2004, the 44th Miss International pageant, was held on October 16, 2004 at the Workers Indoor Arena in Beijing, China. This is the first time event to be held in China for contest was being held outside of Japan and the United States are headquarter's homecountry. 58 contestants from all over the world competed for the crown.

At the end of the event, Jeymmy Vargas of Colombia was crowned Miss International 2004 by the previous winner, Goizeder Azúa of Venezuela. Vargas was the third Colombian woman to win the Miss International title.

== Results ==
=== Placements ===
Placement	Contestant
Miss International 2004	Colombia – Jeymmy Vargas
1st Runner-Up	United States – Amy Holbrook
2nd Runner-Up	Greece – Olga Kypriotou
Top 15	China – Sun Yue; France – Lucie Degletagne; Germany – Natascha Börger; India – Mihika Verma; Japan – Tamiko Kawahara; Latvia – Jeļena Keirāne; Mongolia – Sodtuya Chadraabal; Philippines – Margaret Ann Bayot; Russia – Nataliya Kolodeznikova; South Korea – Kim In-ha; Spain – Cristina Domínguez; United Kingdom – Laura Shields

=== Special awards ===
Awards	Contestant
Miss Friendship	Hong Kong - Fu Sze Sze-Wai
Miss Photogenic	Mongolia - Sodtuya Chadraabal
Best National Costume	China - Sun Yue
Miss Goodwill	Russia - Nataliya Kolodeznikova

== Contestants ==
- Angola – Telma de Jesus Sonhi
- Aruba – Ysaura Giel
- Australia – Lacey Davis
- Bahamas – Shantell Nicole Hall
- Bolivia – Vanessa Patricia Morón Jarzun
- Brazil – Grazielli Massafera
- Canada – Adelynn Cupino
- Chile – Francisca Valenzuela Rendic
- China – Sun Yue
- Colombia – Jeymmy Vargas
- Costa Rica – Tatiana Vargas Cruz
- Cyprus – Demetra Mouski
- Czech Republic – Michaela Wostlová
- Dominican Republic – Carol María Arciniegas
- Ecuador – Irene Andrea Zunino Garcia
- Egypt – Dina Abel
- El Salvador – Andrea Hernández
- Ethiopia – Helina Mezegbu
- Finland – Henna Ylilauri
- France – Lucie Degletagne
- Germany – Natascha Vanessa Börger Sevilla
- Greece – Olga Kypriotou
- Hawaii – Kellie Peterson
- Hong Kong – Fu Sze-Sze
- Hungary – Blanka Bakos
- Iceland – Halldora Rut Bjarnadottir
- India – Mihika Verma
- Israel – Li'or Keren
- Japan – Tamiko Kawahara
- Latvia – Jeļena Keirāne
- Lebanon – Nataly Nasrallah
- Malaysia – Lim Lee Ching
- Mexico – Bernadette Gonzalez
- Mongolia – Sodtuya Chadraabal
- New Caledonia – Yvana Parotu
- Northern Mariana Islands – Kenyelyn Litumular Arriola
- Norway – Stephanie Eide Furuguiel
- Panama – Anabella Isabel Hale Ruíz
- Peru – Aldana Joyce García Jahnsen
- Philippines – Margaret Ann "Maan" Awitan Bayot
- Poland – Marta Matyjasik
- Puerto Rico – Meredith Herrera
- Romania – Ramona-Angela Raut
- Russia – Nataliya Kolodeznikova
- Senegal – Aminata Dieye
- Serbia and Montenegro – Jasna Bozovic
- Singapore – Sherry Ng Yun Feng
- Slovakia – Aneta Kailingová
- South Korea – Kim In-ha
- Spain – Cristina Torres Domínguez
- Thailand – Sunisa Pasuk
- Tunisia – Rym Laalai
- Turkey – Gulsah Sahin
- Ukraine – Yuliya Kumpan
- United Kingdom – Laura Shields
- United States – Amy Lynne Holbrook
- Venezuela – Eleidy Aparicio
- Zambia – Cynthia Kanema

== Notes ==
=== Did not compete ===
- Belize – Farah Carisa Evans
- Nigeria – Ene Maya Lawani
- Paraguay – Myriam Raquel Rodriguez
- Sri Lanka – Shehara Silva
- Tahiti – Tania Tinirauarii
