= Miss Universe China =

National beauty pageant competition in China

- Formation: 2002; 24 years ago
- Type: Beauty pageant
- Headquarters: Shanghai
- Location: China
- Members: Miss Universe
- Official language: Chinese
- Owner: Shenzhen Pudum Media
- President: Li Xiaoning
- Website: missuniverseds.com

Miss Universe China (Chinese: 环球小姐中国区大赛) is a national beauty pageant that selects China's representative to the Miss Universe pageant since 2002.

== History ==
The Miss Universe China Organization was established in 2002. The first ever Miss Universe China titleholder, Zhuo Ling, was selected in Guangdong province in March, 2002. She represented her country in Miss Universe 2002 and placed 2nd runner-up.

In July 2002, the Miss Universe license for China was awarded to Johnny Kao, a prominent Chinese-American entrepreneur and businessman. The organization held the Miss Universe China pageant for the next few years.

On January 6, 2011, the Miss Universe Organization designated media icon and entrepreneur Yue-Sai Kan as the official licensee for the People's Republic of China. Miss Universe officials and the then-reigning titleholder, Ximena Navarrete of Mexico, traveled to China to award the license to Kan. In her first year, Yue-Sai Kan set up an international calibre pageant, flying in foreign celebrities including Petra Nemcova, Fadil Berisha and Riyo Mori to headline and launching a multimillion-dollar production with major corporate sponsors. In subsequent years, the pageant has raised millions of dollars for China's national charities as well as Kan's China Beauty Charity Foundation. Celebrities including Paris Hilton and Charles Aznavour have participated in the pageant, and former Harper's Bazaar chief Lizzette Kattan provides styling for each year's candidates. Celebrity makeup artist Yuko Takahashi, ruwnay trainer Lu Sierra and DIBS Beauty CEO Jeff Lee have historically prepared the most successful winners in advance of the Miss Universe finals.

Under Yue-Sai Kan, the Miss Universe China Organization conducts a national search for its titleholder, consisting of a combination of regional preliminaries in major cities and provinces and direct auditions. Contestants and titleholders are trained for both the Miss China and Miss Universe competitions by an international panel of experts who prepare them in a wide range of areas, including media skills, presentation, makeup and English lessons. Winners of the Miss Universe China pageant receive one of the most valuable national crowns in the world, a diamond and ruby-encrusted tiara from Luk Fook valued at over US$430,000, as well as wardrobes supplied by Shanghai Tang, Sherri Hill, LOVA and leading Chinese couturier Guo Pei and professional modeling portfolios. They are also invited to walk for various designers at New York Fashion Week and Shanghai Fashion Week and receive red carpet invitations to the Shanghai International Film Festival and Hawaii International Film Festival.

Nearly every contestant fielded by Kan since she began heading the pageant has brought home an award from the Miss Universe finals, including three finalists and two special awards.

In 2017, Jacky Fan, Xin Fu Lai Enterprise Management Co., LTD. took over Miss Universe China Organization. There will be 33 Regional Competitions happening across the country domestically, 1 Online Regional Competition Area, and 1 Overseas Special Audition happening in the US.

In 2021, Li Xiaoning, took over the Miss Universe China Organization as the new president along with the return of Yue-Sai Kan as official Honorary Chairman.

== Formats ==
Miss China beauty pageant is traditionally holding provincial representation every year. The 21 provinces across China will compete for the crown. In the final result, there will be Second Runner-up, First Runner-up, then finally Miss China winner.

- Miss Anhui
- Miss Fujian
- Miss Gansu
- Miss Guangdong
- Miss Guizhou
- Miss Hainan
- Miss Hebei
- Miss Heilongjiang
- Miss Hubei
- Miss Hunan
- Miss Jiangsu
- Miss Jiangxi
- Miss Jilin
- Miss Liaoning
- Miss Qinghai
- Miss Shaanxi
- Miss Shandong
- Miss Shanxi
- Miss Sichuan
- Miss Yunnan
- Miss Zhejiang

== Documentary ==
In 2014, the contest was the subject of a documentary series, "Finding Miss China" (寻找中国美), produced by Jonathan Finnigan and Lucky Devil Films of Singapore. The documentary featured three of the Miss Universe China 2014 contestants from their recruitment to their training and official visit to Colombo to meet Sri Lanka's first lady Shiranthi Rajapaksa. The six online episodes of the documentary attracted over ten million viewers in their first month.

== Titleholders ==
- : Declared as Winner
- : Ended as runner-up or top 5/6 qualification
- : Ended as one of the finalists or semifinalists
- : Ended as special awards winner

On occasion, when the winner does not qualify (due to age) a runner-up is sent.

Year	Province	Miss China	Simplified Chinese	Traditional Chinese	Placement at Miss Universe	Special awards	Notes
Yue-Sai Kan ownership & Li Xiaoning directorship — a franchise holder to Miss Universe from 2020
2026	Shanghai	Wang Shiqi	王诗琪	王詩琪	TBA		
2025	Shandong	Zhao Na	赵娜	趙娜	Top 12	Miss Universe Asia	
2024	Sichuan	Jia Qi	贾琪	賈琪	Top 30		Jia Qi was Miss China 2023, she withdrew from Miss Universe 2023 and allocated to Miss Universe 2024 in Mexico.
2023	Did not compete						
2022	Shanghai	Jiang Sichen	姜思晨	姜思晨	Unplaced		
2021	Zhejiang	Yang Shiyin	杨诗尹	楊詩尹	Unplaced		
2020	Beijing	Sun Jiaxin	孙嘉欣	孫嘉欣	Unplaced		
Jacky Fan (Xin Fu Lai Enterprise Management Co., LTD.) directorship — a franchise holder to Miss Universe between 2017―2019
2019	Hebei	Zhu Xin	朱鑫	朱鑫	Unplaced		
2018	Liaoning	Qin Meisu	秦美苏	秦美蘇	Unplaced		The second runner-up of Miss China 2017 awarded as Miss China 2018.
2017	Sichuan	Qiu Qiang	邱蔷	邱薔	Top 16		Dethroned after competing at Miss Universe 2017.
Yue-Sai Kan directorship — a franchise holder to Miss Universe between 2011―2016
2016	Zhejiang	Li Zhenying	李珍颖	李珍穎	Unplaced		
2015	Guangdong	Xue Yunfang	薛韵芳	薛韻芳	Unplaced	Best National Costume (4th Runner-up)	
2014	Beijing	Hu Yanliang	胡彦良	胡彦良	Unplaced		Yanliang was a runner-up of Miss China 2014. She competed at Miss Universe, after her winner decided to withdraw at Miss Universe 2014.
2014	Henan	Xu Naiqing	许乃蜻	許乃蜻	Did not compete		Resigned before competing at Miss Universe, Xu Naiqing resigned her title to complete her undergraduate education and was succeeded by Hu Yanliang.
2013	Beijing	Jin Ye	靳烨	靳燁	Top 16	Miss Congeniality	
2012	Jilin	Xu Jidan	许继丹	許繼丹	Unplaced	Best National Costume	
2011	Shanghai	Luo Zilin	罗紫琳	羅紫琳	4th Runner-up		
Johnny Kao directorship — a franchise holder to Miss Universe between 2002―2010
2010	Heilongjiang	Tang Wen	唐雯	唐雯	Unplaced		
2009	Shandong	Wang Jingyao	王静瑶	王靜瑤	Unplaced	Miss Congeniality	
2008	Guizhou	Wei Ziya	魏子雅	魏子雅	Unplaced		
2007	Liaoning	Zhang Ningning	张宁宁	張寧寧	Unplaced	Miss Congeniality	Zhang was a runner-up of Miss China 2007, after the main winner, Wei Ziya allocated to Miss Universe 2008.
2006	Heilongjiang	Gao Yinghui	高英慧	高英慧	Unplaced		Qi Fang was replaced by Gao Yinghui as the official representative to Miss Universe 2006.
2006	Shanxi	Qi Fang	齐芳	齊芳	Did not compete		
2005	Sichuan	Tao Siyuan	陶思媛	陶思媛	Unplaced		
2004	Tianjin	Zhang Meng	张萌	張萌	Unplaced		
2003	Fujian	Wu Wei	吴薇	吳薇	Unplaced		
2002	Shanghai	Zhuo Ling	卓灵	卓靈	2nd Runner-up		

== See also ==
- Miss World China
- Miss International China
- Miss Grand China
- Miss Earth China
