= The Face (American TV series) season 2 =

The Face
- Season 2
- Promotional poster
- No. of episodes: 10

Release
- Original network: Oxygen
- Original release: March 5 – May 7, 2014

Season chronology
- ← Previous; Season 1

The second season of The Face premiered on March 5, 2014, on Oxygen. The season followed three supermodel coaches as they competed with each other to find 'the face' of Frédéric Fekkai's hair care brand by the same name.

Model coaches Coco Rocha and Karolína Kurková both opted to leave the show for season two. They were replaced by Anne Vyalitsyna and Lydia Hearst. Nigel Barker also joined to serve as the host for season two. The winner of the competition was 20-year-old Tiana Zarlin from San Diego, California.

== Casting process ==
For season two, contestants had to be aged 18 as of September 1, 2013. After pre-registering themselves online, applicants had to attend an open casting call at Chelsea Studios in New York City on July 21, 2013. They could also apply online by submitting a home video. The deadline for all applications was 22 July.

== Contestants ==
Contestants

(Ages stated are at the start of filming)

Contestant	Age	Height	Hometown	Model coach	Finish	Rank
Isabelle Bianchi	19	1.75 m (5 ft 9 in)	Geneva, Switzerland	Anne	Episode 1	12
Nakisha Bromfield	20	1.80 m (5 ft 11 in)	The Bronx	Lydia	Episode 2	11
Kira Dikhtyar	24	1.75 m (5 ft 9 in)	Moscow, Russia	Naomi	Episode 3	10
Alana Duval	22	1.70 m (5 ft 7 in)	Brownsville	Naomi	Episode 4	9
Allison Millar	19	1.79 m (5 ft 10 1/2 in)	Charleston	Lydia	Episode 5	8
Khadisha Gaye	20	1.80 m (5 ft 11 in)	Dakar, Senegal	Anne	Episode 6	7
Sharon Gallardo	24	1.75 m (5 ft 9 in)	Santo Domingo, Dominican Republic	Anne	Episode 7	6
Amanda Gullickson	18	1.79 m (5 ft 10 1/2 in)	Charlotte	Lydia	Episode 8	5
Felisa Wiley	19	1.79 m (5 ft 10 1/2 in)	Saint Thomas	Naomi	Episode 9	4 (quit)
Ray Clanton	18	1.80 m (5 ft 11 in)	Miami Lakes	Lydia	Episode 10	2
Afiya Bennett	18	1.77 m (5 ft 9 1/2 in)	Brooklyn	Naomi	Episode 10	2
Tiana Zarlin	20	1.80 m (5 ft 11 in)	San Diego	Anne	Episode 10	1

== Episodes ==
No.	Title	Campaign	Winning team	Eliminated	Original release date
1	"Let the Face Begin"	Juicy Couture in a storefront window	Naomi Campbell	Isabelle Bianchi	March 5, 2014
The season kicks off as the twelve finalists meet their mentors Anne Vyalitsyna, Lydia Hearst, and Naomi Campbell in Bryant Park, where they are divided into three teams of four. Later, they must pose together behind a storefront window in a campaign for Juicy Couture. The winning team is revealed, and one of the model hopefuls has her dreams cut short. Special guest: Matthew Ellenberger. Bottom two: Isabelle Bianchi and Ray Clanton.
2	"Bare Your New Look"	Nude photo shoot for Frédéric Fekkai	Naomi Campbell	Nakisha Bromfield	March 12, 2014
The aspiring models receive make overs at the Frédéric Fekkai salon. For the campaign, the models must pose nude in a shoot for the brand's website. Drama escalates after Naomi calls out one of her models, throwing her into conflict with the rest of the girls. After her team is revealed to be the winner of the campaign, Naomi becomes critical of the two models the losing mentors have chosen to send into the elimination room. Bottom two: Khadisha Gaye and Nakisha Bromfield.
3	"Runway Dinner Party"	Pamella Roland runway show	Anne Vyalitsyna	Kira Dikhtyar	March 12, 2014
Naomi attacks Anne and Lydia for choosing their only black models to be put on the chopping block after the racial controversy in the previous episode. The girls later meet Tyson Beckford for a catwalk lesson challenge in preparation for an upcoming runway show. For the campaign, the models must walk on top of a banquet table catwalk in Pamella Roland gowns. The episode culminates in the emotional breakdown of one of the contestants, and for the first time ever, one of the coaches barges into the elimination room mid-ceremony. Special guests: Pamella Roland and Tyson Beckford. Bottom two: Kira Dikhtyar and Ray Clanton.
4	"Sell, Sell, Sell!"	Alex and Ani commercials	Anne Vyalitsyna	Alana Duval	March 5, 2014
The test shoots are thrown out the window as the models are told that they will have to take on the rest of the campaigns unprepared. After the news are revealed the contestants are introduced to their client for the campaign, the CEO of lifestyle brand Alex and Ani, Giovanni Feroce. The goal for the shoot is to create a thirty-second commercial in just one take. Back in the loft, a feud takes place between two of the models. Special guest: Giovanni Feroce. Bottom two: Alana Duval and Allison Millar.
5	"Going Viral"	Viral videos for Liebeskind Berlin	Anne Vyalitsyna	Allison Millar	April 2, 2014
The teams must once again take part in a video campaign, much to the dismay of team Lydia's Allison. The goal is to create a thirty-second viral video with a dance routine that will generate buzz towards the featured brand, Libeskind Berlin. Karen Elson makes a guest appearance to help the models create the best commercial possible. Team Anne V snags their third consecutive win, and Anne must once again decide the fate of one of the hopefuls. Special guests: Karen Elson and Natalie Sears. Bottom two: Allison Millar and Felisa Wiley.
6	"Just One of the Boys"	Gender reversal for Elle.com	Naomi Campbell	Khadisha Gaye	April 9, 2014
Nigel Barker introduces the models to drag superstar RuPaul, who teaches the girls about gender role reversal. For the campaign, the mentors pose in front of the camera with their models for a photo shoot that will be featured on Elle.com's website. Team Anne's winning streak finally comes to a halt, and in the elimination room, one of the contestants wishes she could switch teams. Special guests: Joe Zee and RuPaul Andre Charles. Bottom two: Khadisha Gaye and Amanda Gullickson.
7	"Male Bonding"	Fleur du Mal lingerie with male models	Lydia Hearst	Sharon Gallardo	April 16, 2014
The models pose intimately with complete strangers, in a sexy lingerie campaign for Fleur du Mal. They'll need to find chemistry with their male models in order to stay in the competition. Lydia steps up her game with a more forceful technique. Special guest: Jennifer Zuccarini; featured photographer: Hao Zeng. Bottom two: Felisa Wiley and Sharon Gallardo.
8	"Diamonds Are a Model's Best Friend"	Futuristic Chopard diamonds adverts	Naomi Campbell	Amanda Gullickson	April 23, 2014
The models shoot a jewelry commercial for Chopard. They must remain composed while running in 10 inch heels and dressed in restrictive dresses made by Lady Gaga's favorite designer, Iris Van Herpen. Afiya and Naomi don't see eye to eye. Special guests: Anne Slowey and Marc Hruschka; featured director: Roberto Serrini. Bottom two: Amanda Gullickson and Tiana Zarlin.
9	"Press Your Luck"	Press conference for Frédéric Fekkai's new Hair Fragrance Mist; Q&A with Perez Hilton	Anne Vyalitsyna	Felisa Wiley (quit)	April 30, 2014
The models' composure is tested when they deliver a speech in front of a room full of press. When something catches the models off guard, one loses face with her coach and has a hard time recovering. Special guests: Alyssa Montemurro, Chandra Coleman Harris, Denise Davila, Frédéric Fekkai, Jennifer Jackson, Jennifer Peros, JP Kuehlwein, Leah Chernikoff, Perez Hilton, and Samantha Yanks. Bottom two: Felisa Wiley and Ray Clanton.
10	"Who Will Be the Face"	Go-sees with Frédéric Fekkai; beauty shots by Gilles Bensimon	Anne Vyalitsyna	-	May 7, 2014
The remaining models must dazzle Frederic Fekkai in three of the most difficult challenges yet. In the end, only one will become a spokesperson and ambassador for Frédéric Fekkai's 2014 national ad campaign and win a coveted spread in the July issue of Elle. Special guests: Anne Slowey, Frédéric Fekkai, Roberta Myers, and Tyson Beckford; featured photographer: Gilles Bensimon. Final three: Afiya Bennett, Ray Clanton, and tiana Zarlin. The Face of Frédéric Fekkai: Tiana Zarlin.

== Elimination table ==
Team Anne	Team Lydia	Team Naomi

Place	Contestant	Episodes										
Place	Contestant	1		2	3	4	5	6	7	8	9	10
1	Tiana	IN	IN	IN	WIN	WIN	WIN	IN	IN	LOW	WIN	WINNER
2-3	Ray	IN	LOW	IN	LOW	IN	IN	IN	WIN	IN	LOW	RUNNER-UP
2-3	Afiya	IN	WIN	WIN	IN	IN	IN	WIN	IN	WIN	IN	RUNNER-UP
4	Felisa	IN	WIN	WIN	IN	IN	LOW	WIN	LOW	WIN	QUIT	
5	Amanda	IN	IN	IN	IN	IN	IN	LOW	WIN	OUT		
6	Sharon	IN	IN	IN	WIN	WIN	WIN	IN	OUT			
7	Khadisha	IN	IN	LOW	WIN	WIN	WIN	OUT				
8	Allison	IN	IN	IN	IN	LOW	OUT					
9	Alana	IN	WIN	WIN	IN	OUT						
10	Kira	IN	WIN	WIN	OUT							
11	Nakisha	IN	IN	OUT								
12	Isabelle	IN	OUT									

The contestant was part of the winning team for the episode.
The contestant was at risk of elimination.
The contestant was eliminated from the competition.
The contestant withdrew from the competition.
The contestant was a Runner-Up.
The contestant won The Face.

- During the first segment of episode 1, the final twelve contestants were divided into their respective teams. The first campaign and resulting elimination also took place this episode.
- In episode 5, team Anne won the campaign. Sharon won an individual prize for being the best performer of the campaign.
- In episode 9, Felisa quit while she was in the bottom two with Ray before Anne had made her decision.
