= Flying Solo NYC =

Fashion store in New York City and Paris

Flying Solo is a fashion retail concept store based in SoHo, New York City, and in Paris near the Louvre Museum. The brand provides a platform for independent designers to showcase and sell their work through a shared retail space, press showroom and participation in fashion events, including New York, Paris, and Milan Fashion Weeks.

== Background ==
Flying Solo was founded in 2016 by a group of fashion designers seeking an alternative to traditional retail and wholesale fashion structures. The cooperative model allows designers to manage their own retail presence while benefiting from collaborative marketing and shared exposure. Flying Solo has since expanded to include beauty and home categories, as well as a media showroom.

Every season, Flying Solo presents collections from over 80 international designers in each show, further establishing itself as a platform for emerging talent to take off.
