= Karen Hu =

Karen Hu may refer to:

- Hu Yingzhen, Taiwanese actress and model
- Hu Yanliang, Chinese model
