= Andrea Boragno =

Italian business executive

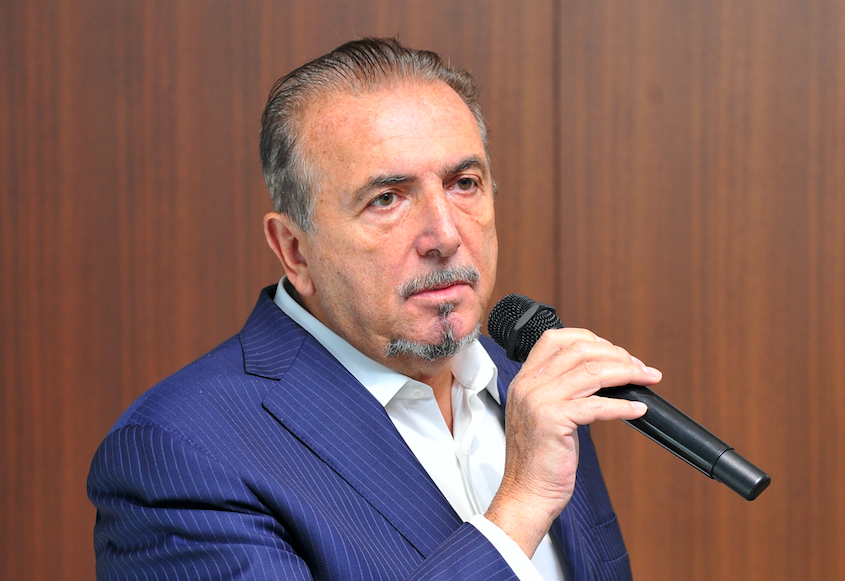
- Born: August 31, 1950 (age 75); Albissola Mare, Savona, Italy
- Education: Genoa University (BS), Bocconi University (MBA)
- Occupation: Advisor of Toray international Europe Gmbh
- Employer: Toray international Europe Gmbh

Andrea Boragno (born in 1950) is an Italian business manager.

In Alcantara where he was CEO from 2004 to 2023 and chairman from 2006 to 2024, pioneered corporate commitment to sustainability

He is also noted for connecting the brand Alcantara to the art world identifying a new form of collaboration between industry and the world of art.

He successfully made brand awareness central to Alcantara’s competitive strategy: Interbrand’s analysis shows that Alcantara brand value, In the period 2006 – 2015, increased 15 times reaching the value of 100 million Euros.

In April 2021, Boragno received from the Japanese Government one of the highest honors assigned to foreign citizens, the Honor of the Rising Sun, for "having contributed to raise the value of Japanese technology and industrial quality, and to promote mutual understanding between Japan and Italy".

Under his leadership in 2010 Alcantara received as certificate of excellence the special Confindustria-Pininfarina Award: the Plate of Presidency of Italian Republic.

== Education ==
Boragno earned a master's degree in business administration (MBA) at Bocconi University in Milan after acquiring a bachelor's degree in chemical engineering at Genoa University.

== Career ==
Earlier in his career Boragno held positions at companies like Pirelli, Montedison, Himont, and Montefibre in a range of functions from marketing and sales to corporate planning, technical marketing, and finance and accounting.

In 1990, he joined Alcantara S.p.A., an Italian company belonging to Toray Industries Inc. In 1998, he was appointed CEO of TUA Inc., a New York-based American company resulting from Toray's takeover of Springs Industries’ microfibre business.

Boragno has been Chairman of the Alcantara company since 2006, and was CEO from 2004 to 2023. He has also been a senior director of Toray Industries Inc. from June 2007 to 2023.

Since 2024 Boragno has been Advisor of Toray international Europe Gmbh

Boragno is Vice President of the Fondazione Italia Giappone (Italy-Japan Foundation).

== Focus on sustainability ==
Boragno is noted for initiating in 2009 Alcantara's strong commitment to sustainability. Under Boragno's leadership, the company carried out widespread stakeholder engagement activities through the involvement of international partners such as the World Bank/Connect4Climate, Venice International University, and the Earth Day Network.

Boragno built on such collaborations to host periodic international symposiums designed to promote sustainability-oriented business management at the global level. As of today, Alcantara, in partnership with the VIU (Venice International University), has organized six Symposia:

- 1st edition: "Sustainability and the New Automotive Value Chain" Venice, October 2014;
- 2nd edition: "The Automotive Ecosystem on the Global Road to Sustainability. The Asian Perspective", Venice, October 2015;
- 3rd edition: "Sustainability and Corporate Value", Tokyo, October 2016, in partnership with Nikkei, and the Waseda University, with the support of The Society of Global Business;
- 4th edition: "Coping with Change: Global Warming and Decarbonization", Venice, March 2018;
- 5th edition: "Climate How: How to Engage Society and Deploy Decarbonization", Venice, February 2019, with the support of the World Bank's Connect4Climate global partnership program;
- 6th edition: "Greenwashing and Sustainability: a Growing Trend that Needs To Be Addressed", Venice, October 2021, with the support of SIA (Social Impact Agenda for Italy)

Andrea Boragno was also invited to speak about Pope Francis's encyclical Laudato Si’ to put forward Alcantara's experience as an example of a sustainable company in 2015.

== Focus on art world ==
Approximately ten years ago, Boragno initiated a series of projects between Alcantara and the art sector. These included collaborations with artists and international museum institutions.

The collaborations with the art world involved more than 15 museums (including MAXXI, Victoria and Albert Museum, Yuz Museum Shanghai, Mori Art Museum, Palazzo Reale), more than 10 cities (among others Rome, London, Shanghai, Tokyo, Milan) and around 100 artists (to mention but a few: Nendo, Marcel Wanders, Ross Lovegrove, Giulio Cappellini, Nanda Vigo, Yuri Ancarani, Qin Feng, Qu Lei Lei, Chiharu Shiota, Iris Van Herpen), for a total of more than 100 artworks exhibited.

Boragno’s important role in the development and growth of Alcantara’s relationship with the art world in recent years was the basis for the book “ALCANTARA The Material of Art”, published by Skira and edited by Luca Masia. The book tells the story of the birth and development of this special relationship, highlighting the many collaborations and projects Alcantara has undertaken with internationally renowned artists and designers.

Over the years, the dialogue with creativity brought to the definition of a new form of cultural collaboration between industry and the art world. In fact the relationship purely based on patronage or fundraising objectives has been replaced by a cultural partnership relationship with international museums and institutions, where Alcantara material has become integral part of the creative process.
