= Zilin (surname) =

Zilin may refer to:

- Ding Zilin, retired professor of philosophy
- Luo Zilin, Chinese fashion model and beauty pageant titleholder
- Zhang Zilin, Chinese actress

== See also ==
- Zilin
