= Jin Ye =

Chinese model (born 1988)

- Born: November 28, 1988 (age 37); Shijiazhuang, Hebei, China
- Height: 1.78 m (5 ft 10 in)
- Beauty pageant titleholder
- Title: Miss Universe China 2013
- Hair color: Black
- Eye color: Black
- Major competitions: Miss China World 2009 (Unplaced); Miss China World 2011 (Unplaced); Miss China World 2013 (Unplaced); Miss Universe China 2013 (Winner); Miss Universe 2013 (Top 16)

Jin Ye
- Traditional Chinese: 靳燁
- Simplified Chinese: 靳烨
- Hanyu Pinyin: Jìn Yè

Jin Ye (靳烨; Jìn Yè; born November 28, 1988) is a Chinese dancer, model and beauty pageant titleholder who was crowned as Miss Universe China 2013 and represented her country at the Miss Universe 2013 pageant in Russia.

== Early life ==
Jin was born in Shijiazhuang, Hebei. She is a model in Hebei. In her spare time, she enjoys reading, dancing and photography. She competed for Miss China World in 2009, 2011, 2013 but did not place. She is good friends with Miss China World 2013 Yu Weiwei who also competed Miss China World in 2009, 2011 and 2013.

== Miss Universe China 2013 ==
Jin was crowned by the previous year's winner, Diana Xu, Miss Universe China 2012. The pageant finale was on September 28, 2013 and was held at Jing An Shangri-La Hotel in Shanghai.

== Miss Universe 2013 ==
Jin competed at Miss Universe 2013 in Moscow, Russia where she finished in the Top 16. She was the third Chinese woman to place at Miss Universe. She was also chosen by her fellow contestants as Miss Congeniality and was awarded a $1,000 cash prize and a gift from Diamond Nexus.

Awards and achievements
| Preceded by Xu Jidan | Miss Universe China; 2013 | Succeeded by Nora Xu |
| Preceded by Xu Jidan | Chinese representative at Miss Universe; 2013 | Succeeded by Karen Hu |
