= Nora Xu =

Chinese model (born 1995)

Xu Naiqing
- Born: 1995 (age 30–31); Luoyang, Henan, China
- Height: 1.78 m (5 ft 10 in)
- Beauty pageant titleholder
- Title: Miss China 2014
- Hair color: Black
- Eye color: Black
- Major competitions: Elite Model Look International 2013; Miss China 2014 (Winner) Resigned

Xu Naiqing (simplified Chinese: 许乃蜻; traditional Chinese: 許乃蜻; pinyin: Xǔ Nǎiqīng; born 1995 in Luoyang, Henan) is a Chinese model and beauty pageant titleholder who was crowned as Miss Universe China in its 2014 edition. On November 3, 2014, she stepped down from the title in order to complete her undergraduate education, and was replaced by Karen Hu as China's representative to the Miss Universe 2014 pageant.

== Early life ==
Xu studied at Donghua University. She has been a model since age 14. She won the right to represent China in the Elite Model Look International 2013 competition when she was 18 years old but did not place.

== Pageantry ==
=== Miss Universe China 2014 ===
Xu was crowned as Miss China 2014 (Miss Universe China 2014) and represented Henan. The pageant was held on September 13 at Shangri-la Pudong Shanghai. Miss Universe 2012, Olivia Culpo was a judge at the final show. During the pageant, Xu jointly won the "Best Hair" award with Muyi (Katrina) Peng of Hunan, which entitles them to serve as spokesmodels for the Conair Corporation and Babyliss lines.

=== Miss Universe 2014 ===
Xu resigned on November 3, 2014, due to conflicts with Yue-Sai Kan, the National Director of Miss Universe China. She was replaced by her first runner-up Hu Yanliang, Miss Universe Beijing, who became the new Miss China and competed for the Miss Universe 2014 crown but was unplaced.

Awards and achievements
Preceded by Jin Ye	Miss Universe China; 2014	Succeeded by Karen Hu
