= Bing (singer) =

Chinese pop singer

BING
- Born: China
- Occupation: Singer
- Years active: 2015–present
- Awards: Music Pioneer List – Top Ten Pioneer Golden Songs

BING is a Chinese pop singer, who became popular through Jiangsu Satellite TV’s program "See Your Voice". She is the first Chinese female singer to be invited to perform at London Fashion Week in September 2015. BING was called "The Queen of Dolphin of New Era" by China Daily.

Her new album includes eleven tracks produced by award-winning musician ZENG Yan and European musicians, including Air Road, Met You, Learning To Say Love, and many other Chinese and English songs. BING was invited to attend the Grammy Awards Ceremony in 2019.

== Career ==
In September 2015, BING debuted during London Fashion Week as the first Chinese female singer to be invited, and released her first single "Air Road (English Version)". She was called "The Queen of Dolphin of New Era" by media. She was invited to Shanghai Fashion Week in October 2015, and released the songs "Air Road (Chinese Version)" and "Met You". These two songs charted on the Chinese "Music Pioneer List". In December 2015, BING received "The Top Ten Golden Melody Awards in the Mainland" and "The Best Performing Singer of the Year" awards on the "Music Pioneer List" 2015 Awards Ceremony, and performed the song "Met You".

In April 2016, BING performed on the program See Your Voice on Jiangsu Satellite TV. Online views of this performance exceeded 110 million, and it was listed as an entertainment focus by Tencent Video. In December 2016, BING won the "Top Ten Golden Melody Awards in the Mainland" and "The Best Performing Artist of the Year" awards.

In September 2017, BING was invited by Timberland during New York Fashion Week to be present on the New York aircraft carrier.

In February 2018, BING was invited by the design brands Yajun, SongJungWan and Chromat to New York Fashion Week. In May 2018 at Cannes Film Festival, BING was invited by the director of the film Whitney to watch the movie's premiere.

In February 2019, BING was invited to perform in the 2019 Spring Festival Gala program held by Guangdong TV Station, singing "左手指月" and her new single "Learning To Say Love". She also attended the 61st Annual Grammy Awards ceremony. BING attended the China Fashion Gala held by Yue-Sai Kan China Beauty Charity Fund and China Institute in New York City as a special performer. BING, as the first Chinese singer ever invited, sang at the 68th United Nation NGO Conference. Bing sang the theme song "Sharing One World" of UN NGO Conference at both the opening and closing ceremonies.

== Works ==
Song
"Hanging On"
"Air Road"
"Met You"
"Teardrop"
"左手指月"
"Learning To Say Love"
