= The Face (American TV series) season 1 =

The Face
- Season 1
- Promotional poster
- No. of episodes: 8

Release
- Original network: Oxygen
- Original release: February 12 – March 26, 2013

Season chronology
- Next → Season 2

The first season of The Face premiered online on February 1, 2013 and on television on February 12, 2013 on Oxygen. The premiere season followed three supermodel coaches as they competed with each other to find 'the face' of cosmetic retail giant Ulta Beauty.

Supermodel and executive producer Naomi Campbell, together with supermodels Karolina Kurkova and Coco Rocha, served as supermodel mentors for the first season. Nigel Barker, a previous judge for cycles 2 to 18 of America's Next Top Model, serve as host as well. It featured 12 aspiring contestants from the United States of America, Canada, China, Belarus, and Australia.

The winner of the competition was 21-year-old Devyn Abdullah from Bronx, New York.

== Casting process ==
Aspiring contestants for the show had to pre-register themselves online, and were encouraged to attend open casting calls or send in a video and application. The deadline for all applications was August 3, 2012. The show required all contestants to be 18 years old and over at the time of auditioning in order to be eligible for the program. Contestants from any country around the world could apply, as long as they had all the required documentation in order to remain in the United States for the duration of the series.

== Contestants ==
Contestants

(Ages stated are at start of filming)

| Contestant | Age | Height | Hometown | Model coach | Finish | Rank |
|---|---|---|---|---|---|---|
| Aleksandra Dubrovskaya | 24 | 1.77 m (5 ft 9 1/2 in) | Murmansk, Russia | Naomi | Episode 2 | 12 |
| Christy Nelson | 25 | 1.81 m (5 ft 11 1/2 in) | Atascadero | Karolina | Episode 3 | 11 |
| Marlee Nichols | 22 | 1.75 m (5 ft 9 in) | Los Angeles | Coco | Episode 4 | 10 (quit) |
| Brittany Mason | 27 | 1.78 m (5 ft 10 in) | Anderson | Coco | Episode 4 | 9 |
| Madeleine Armstrong | 24 | 1.75 m (5 ft 9 in) | Melbourne, Australia | Karolina | Episode 5 | 8 |
| Sandra Woodley | 22 | 1.78 m (5 ft 10 in) | Philadelphia | Naomi | Episode 6 | 7 |
| Stephanie Lalanne | 22 | 1.78 m (5 ft 10 in) | San Francisco | Coco | Episode 7 | 6-5 |
| Jocelyn Chew | 21 | 1.75 m (5 ft 9 in) | Victoria, Canada | Naomi | Episode 7 | 6-5 |
| Ebony Olivia Grace Smith | 22 | 1.75 m (5 ft 9 in) | Indianapolis | Karolina | Episode 8 | 4 |
| Margaux Brooke Snell | 22 | 1.70 m (5 ft 7 in) | Roswell | Coco | Episode 8 | 3-2 |
| Luo Zilin | 26 | 1.83 m (6 ft 0 in) | Zhejiang, China | Naomi | Episode 8 | 3-2 |
| Devyn Abdullah | 22 | 1.80 m (5 ft 11 in) | The Bronx | Karolina | Episode 8 | 1 |

== Episodes ==
| No. | Title | Campaign | Winning team | Eliminated | Original release date | Viewers (millions) |
|---|---|---|---|---|---|---|
| 1 | "The Fight to Make the Final 12" | Natural beauty shots; self-administered 'transformations' with accessories from DKNY (casting) | - | - | February 5, 2013 | 0.34 |
Supermodels Coco Rocha, Karolina Kurkova, and Naomi Campbell begin their search for 'The Face'. The final three teams are selected, and the hopefuls move one step closer to the ultimate prize.
| 2 | "Game On!" | Grouped in a shipyard for W Magazine | Karolina Kurkova | Aleksandra Dubrovskaya | February 12, 2013 | 0.51 |
The final twelve move into their new loft in New York City, and they are coached through their very first campaign photo shoot by their supermodel mentors. The goal is to create an ad campaign worthy of being featured on the pages of W Magazine. Bottom two: Aleksandra Dubrovskaya and Stephanie Lalanne. Special guests: Bethann Hardison, Claudine Ingeneri, Stefano Tonchi; featured photographer: Patrick Demarchelier.
| 3 | "Model Warfare" | Commercial with Cosabella lingerie in teams | Naomi Campbell | Christy Nelson | February 19, 2013 | 0.46 |
The remaining contestants undergo a challenge for Vogue Eyewear, and pressure mounts as bickering begins to ravage Team Naomi. For the shoot, the models must perform a commercial in Cosabella lingerie with their teammates. Bottom two: Christy Nelson and Stephanie Lalanne. Special guest: Guido Campello; featured videographer: Brendan O'Carroll.
| 4 | "Falling From Grace" | Kleinfeld bridal dress fashion show | Naomi Campbell | Brittany Mason (eliminated); Marlee Nichols (quit) | February 26, 2013 | 0.56 |
An unexpected turn of events sees one girl leaving the competition for good. The girls take part in their first runway show for Kleinfeld Bridal, and they must walk in couture bridal gowns on a grand staircase. After the winning team is revealed, it's goodbye for another one of the wannabe models. Bottom two: Brittany Mason and Ebony Olivia Smith.
| 5 | "We Are the Most Miserable Team Here" | Look-books for Marshall's in teams | Naomi Campbell | Madeline Armstrong | March 5, 2013 | 0.50 |
The eight remaining models prepare for a dancing challenge, and must later shoot for a Marshall's lookbook with their teammates. The arguments between Jocelyn and Sandra reach an all-time high when Naomi steps in to intervene, and a shocking elimination catches one team by surprise. Bottom two: Madeline Armstrong and Stephanie Lalanne.
| 6 | "Every Rose Has its Thorns" | Self-directed commercials for Opensky.com | Karolina Kurkova | Sandra Woodley | March 12, 2013 | 0.45 |
The hopefuls prepare for their latest test shoot challenge — shooting a commercial for Christian Louboutin shoes. Tempers flare when one model threatens to leave the competition. For the campaign, the teams must write their own scripts and direct a commercial in which they attempt to sell miscellaneous items from Opensky.com. Bottom two: Margaux Brooke Snell and Sandra Woodley.
| 7 | "Red Carpet Ready?" | Red Carpet interviews conducted by Wendy Williams | Karolina Kurkova | Jocelyn Chew, Stephanie Lalanne | March 19, 2013 | 0.51 |
The girls learn about the double elimination that will be taking place, and prepare to win the final campaign that will assure them a place in the finale. After the glitz and glamour of the red carpet and a surprise interview conducted by Wendy Williams, the winning coach must decide which two girls will be sent home. Model Pat Cleveland makes an appearance to prepare the girls for the competition. Bottom four: Jocelyn Chew, Margaux Brooke Snell, Stephanie Lalanne, and Luo Zilin.
| 8 | "Finding the Face... The Finale" | ULTA Beauty beauty shots | Karolina Kurkova | Ebony Olivia Smith | March 26, 2013 | 0.55 |
The remaining four contestants take part in their final shoot for ULTA beauty. One last surprise elimination sees only three of the models put through to the final task, which is walking in the runway for a Zac Posen fashion show. Final four: Devyn Abdullah, Ebony Olivia Smith, and Margaux Brooke Snell. Face of ULTA Beauty: Devyn Abdullah.

== Elimination table ==
| Team Coco | Team Karolina | Team Naomi |

| Place | Contestant | Episodes | | | | | | | | |
| Place | Contestant | 1 | 2 | 3 | 4 | 5 | 6 | 7 | 8 | |
|---|---|---|---|---|---|---|---|---|---|---|
| 1 | Devyn | IN | WIN | IN | IN | IN | WIN | WIN | IN | WINNER |
| 2-3 | Zilin | IN | IN | WIN | WIN | WIN | IN | LOW | IN | RUNNER-UP |
| 2-3 | Margaux | IN | IN | IN | IN | IN | LOW | LOW | IN | RUNNER-UP |
| 4 | Ebony | IN | WIN | IN | LOW | IN | WIN | WIN | OUT | |
| 5-6 | Jocelyn | IN | IN | WIN | WIN | WIN | IN | OUT | | |
| 5-6 | Stephanie | IN | LOW | LOW | IN | LOW | IN | OUT | | |
| 7 | Sandra | IN | IN | WIN | WIN | WIN | OUT | | | |
| 8 | Madeleine | IN | WIN | IN | IN | OUT | | | | |
| 9 | Brittany | IN | IN | IN | OUT | | | | | |
| 10 | Marlee | IN | IN | IN | QUIT | | | | | |
| 11 | Christy | IN | WIN | OUT | | | | | | |
| 12 | Aleksandra | IN | OUT | | | | | | | |

The contestant was part of the winning team for the episode.
The contestant was at risk of elimination.
The contestant was eliminated from the competition.
The contestant withdrew from the competition.
The contestant was a Runner-Up.
The contestant won The Face.

- Episode 1 was the casting episode. The final twelve were divided into individual teams of four as they were selected.
- In episode 4, Marlee withdrew from the competition due to personal problems.
- In episode 7, both of the remaining models from the losing teams had to face Karolina for elimination. Margaux and Zi Lin were saved, while Stephanie and Jocelyn were eliminated.
- In episode 8, Zilin, Devyn, and Margaux were put through to the final runway show while Ebony was eliminated.
