= Anne Vyalitsyna =

Russian-American model (born 1986)

- А́нна Вьяли́цына
- Born: Anna Sergeyevna Vyalitsyna; 19 March 1986 (age 40); Gorky, Russian SFSR, Soviet Union (now Nizhny Novgorod, Russia)
- Other name: Anne V
- Occupation: Model
- Partner(s): Adam Cahan (2014–2021); Adam Levine (2010–2012)
- Children: 1
- Modelling information
- Height: 1.78 m (5 ft 10 in)
- Hair colour: Blonde
- Eye colour: Green
- Agency: The Lions (New York, Los Angeles); Elite Model Management (Paris); Women Management (Milan); Models 1 (London)

Anna Sergeyevna "Anne" Vyalitsyna (Russian: А́нна Серге́евна Вяли́цына; born 19 March 1986), also known as Anne V, is a Russian-American model best known for her 10-consecutive-year appearances (2005–2014) in the Sports Illustrated Swimsuit Issue.

== Early life and discovery ==
Vyalitsyna was born in the Russian city of Gorky (now Nizhny Novgorod). Both of her parents are physicians. Her father is a sports doctor for an association football team and her mother is a pediatrician. Vyalitsyna started her professional modeling career at the age of 15 after IMG Models scouted her in Saint Petersburg while looking for new faces for MTV's Fashionably Loud Europe. She entered the contest and moved to New York after winning a contest sponsored by IMG and MTV. She became an American citizen on 16 November 2013.

== Career ==
Within six months after winning the contest, Vyalitsyna worked for Anna Molinari, Chloé and Sportmax. She has appeared on the covers of Vogue, ELLE, and Glamour. She made her debut in the Sports Illustrated Swimsuit Issue in 2005 and has appeared in it each year until 2014. She was the object/subject of Joanne Gair body painting works in the 2005 edition.

She had an uncredited cameo in the fifth installment of the Die Hard film franchise, A Good Day to Die Hard.

In 2016, she walked for the Versace SS 2017 fashion show along with Carmen Kass, Bette Franke, Adriana Lima, Naomi Campbell, Caroline Trentini, and Mariacarla Boscono.

In 2018, she walked for the Intimissimi show

Then, in Fall 2020, she walked for Veronica Beard, Rag & Bone, and Salvatore Ferragamo

After a three year hiatus, she made her runway comeback in 2023, starting off with Valentino Haute Couture FW23, and subsequently also walking for the following SS 2024 shows: Carolina Herrera, Retrofete, Prabal Gurung which she opened, Staud, Richard Quinn, John Richmond, Elisabeta Franchi and Chiara Boni Le Petite Robe which she closed, Givenchy SS 2024 walking alongside Jessica Stam, Natasha Poly.

== Personal life ==
In 2009, Vyalitsyna completed the ING New York City Marathon. She volunteered to guide a disabled athlete through the race for Achilles International and tweeted about the race in real-time.

In 2010, Vyalitsyna started dating Adam Levine, the lead singer of Maroon 5, and they appeared together on the November 2011 cover of Vogue Russia. She also appeared in the Maroon 5 music videos for "Misery" and "Never Gonna Leave This Bed." The couple broke up in April 2012. After she and Levine ended their relationship, she dated baseball player Matt Harvey for eight months from 2013 to 2014.

On 19 March 2015, Vyalitsyna announced that she was pregnant with her first child by boyfriend Adam Cahan. They welcomed daughter Alaska on 25 June 2015, stating that this name was chosen because Alaska is "where the U.S. and Russia meet". On 5 June 2016, Vyalitsyna and Cahan got engaged, but had separated by 2018.

== Filmography ==
=== Film ===
Year	Title	Role	Notes
2013	A Good Day to Die Hard	Arsenal Sales Girl	Deleted scene only
2014	Lullaby	Brooke	

=== Television ===
Year	Title	Role	Notes
2014	The Face	Herself / Coach	Season 2

=== Web ===
Year	Title	Role	Notes	Ref.
2010	Palm Trees & Power Lines	Herself	Episode: "Part 2"; cameo appearance	

=== Music videos ===
Year	Title	Artist
2004	"Out Is Through" (Version 2)	Alanis Morissette
2010	"Misery" (Original and UK versions)	Maroon 5
2011	"Never Gonna Leave This Bed"	Maroon 5
