= Jing An Kerry Centre =

Coordinates: 31°13′28.14″N 121°27′0.65″E

- 静安嘉里中心
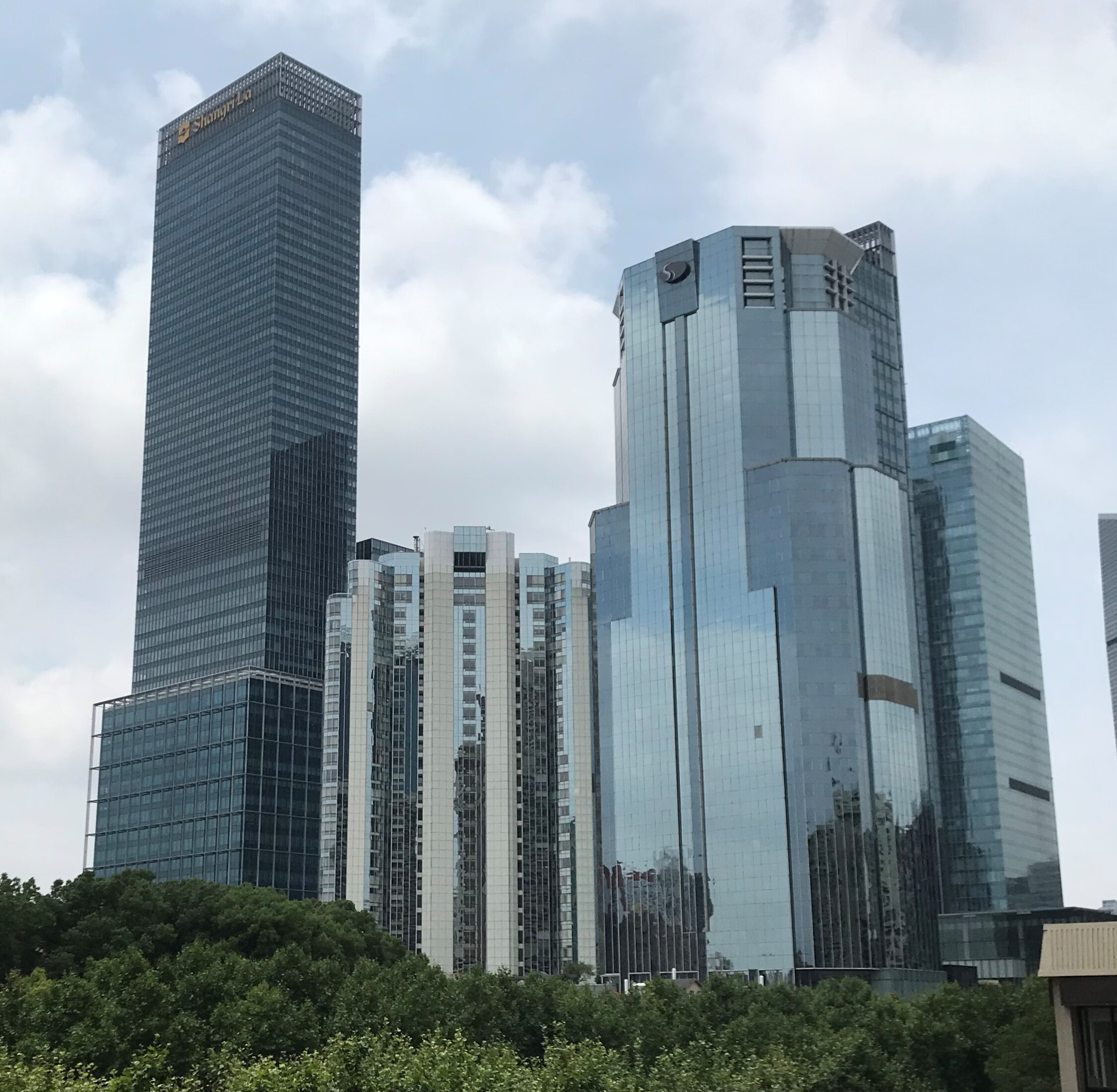
- Tower 3 (left) and Tower 1 (right)
- Interactive map of the Jing An Kerry Centre area

General information
- Status: Completed
- Type: Office, hotel, retail
- Location: 1515 Nanjing Road West, Jing'an District, Shanghai, China
- Construction started: 1994 (Tower 1), 2009 (Tower 2&3)
- Opened: 1998 (Tower 1), 2013 (Tower 2&3)

Height
- Height: Tower 1: 132.8m Tower 2: 260.0m Tower 3: 197.8m

Technical details
- Floor count: Tower 1: 30 Tower 2: 58; Tower 3: 43
- Floor area: Tower 1: 34,000 m^{2} (370,000 sq ft); Tower 2+3: 381,099 m^{2} (4,102,120 sq ft)

Design and construction
- Developer: Kerry Properties Limited

Other information
- Parking: 1340

Jing An Kerry Centre, or Jing'an Kerry Centre, is an integrated commercial complex situated at No. 1515 Nanjing Road West in Jing'an District, Shanghai, China. The complex comprises three skyscrapers: Towers 1, 2, and 3. Tower 1 stands at 132.8 meters (436 ft) tall, Tower 2 is 260 meters (850 ft) tall, and Tower 3 is 197.8 meters (649 ft) tall. The 450,000-square-meter (4,800,000 sq ft) complex features an 86,000 m^{2} (930,000 sq ft) retail space, 152,000 m^{2} (1,640,000 sq ft) of office space, the Jing An Shangri-La, 18,000 m^{2} (190,000 sq ft) (133 units) of residential space, and a 136,000 m^{2} (1,460,000 sq ft) underground car park with 1,340 parking spaces.

As of 2020, Tower 2 is the 24th tallest building in Shanghai, and Tower 3 is the 77th tallest building.

== Transportation ==
Jing An Kerry Centre is connected to both Shanghai Metro Line 2 and Line 7 (Jing'an Temple Station).

== See also ==
- List of shopping malls in China
- List of tallest buildings in Shanghai
