= The Face (American TV series) =

- Genre: Competition
- Presented by: Current: Nigel Barker (1–2)
- Judges: Current: Naomi Campbell (1–2); Anne Vyalitsyna (2); Lydia Hearst (2); Former: Coco Rocha (1); Karolina Kurkova (1)
- Country of origin: United States
- Original language: English
- No. of seasons: 2
- No. of episodes: 18

Production
- Executive producers: Eden Gaha; Paul Franklin; Matt Westmore; Naomi Campbell
- Running time: 40 to 44 minutes
- Production company: Shine America

Original release
- Network: Oxygen
- Release: February 12, 2013 – May 7, 2014

Related
- The Face (U.K.); The Face (Australia)

The Face is an American reality television modeling competition series. The show is hosted by Nigel Barker, who was a previous judge on America's Next Top Model. The Face follows three supermodel coaches as they compete with each other to find 'the face' of a make-up brand. It premiered February 12, 2013, on Oxygen.

The series was renewed in April 2013 for a ten-episode second season, which premiered on March 5, 2014. While Naomi Campbell reappears in two seasons, Anne Vyalitsyna and Lydia Hearst replaced Coco Rocha and Karolina Kurkova as supermodel coaches for season two. In late 2014, Oxygen announced that they had no plans for a third season.

== Hosts and mentors ==
| Mentors | Seasons | |
| Mentors | 1 | 2 |
|---|---|---|
| Naomi Campbell | ✔ | |
| Coco Rocha | ✔ | |
| Karolina Kurkova | ✔ | |
| Anne V | | ✔ |
| Lydia Hearst | | ✔ |
| Hosts | Seasons | |
| Hosts | 1 | 2 |
| Nigel Barker | ✔ | |

== Seasons ==
| Seasons | Premiere date | Winner | Runners-up | Other contestants in order of elimination | Number of contestants |
|---|---|---|---|---|---|
| 1 | February 12, 2013 | Devyn Abdullah | Margaux Brooke; Luo Zilin | Aleksandra Dubrovskaya, Christy Nelson, Marlee Nichols (quit), Brittany Mason, Madeleine Armstrong, Sandra Woodley, Stephanie Lalanne, Jocelyn Chew, Ebony Olivia Smith | 12 |
| 2 | March 5, 2014 | Tiana Zarlin | Ray Clanton; Afiya Bennett | Isabelle Bianchi, Nakisha Bromfield, Kira Dikhtyar, Alana Duval, Allison Millar, Khadisha Gaye, Sharon Gallardo, Amanda Gullickson, Felisa Wiley (quit) | 12 |

Mentor's color symbols

Team Naomi (season 1–2)
Team Coco (season 1)
Team Karolina (season 1)
Team Anne (season 2)
Team Lydia (season 2)
