= Wei Ziya =

Chinese model

- Born: Wèi Jìngtíng (魏静婷); October 1984 (age 41–42); Guiyang, Guizhou, China
- Height: 1.75 m (5 ft 9 in)
- Beauty pageant titleholder
- Title: Miss Universe China 2008
- Hair color: Black
- Eye color: Black

Wei Ziya (Chinese: 魏子雅; pinyin: Wèi Zǐyǎ; usually referred to in the media as Ziya Wei; born October 1984) is a Chinese model and beauty pageant titleholder who the winner of Miss Universe China 2007. Wei represented China in Miss Universe 2008 in Vietnam, but was unplaced.
