= Luo Zilin =

Chinese fashion model

- Born: June 6, 1987 (age 39); Shanghai, China
- Occupation: Model
- Height: 6 ft 0 in (1.83 m)
- Beauty pageant titleholder
- Title: Miss Universe China 2011
- Years active: 2003–present
- Hair color: Black
- Eye color: Brown
- Major competitions: Miss Universe China 2011 (Winner); Miss Universe 2011 (4th Runner-Up)

Luo Zilin, or commonly known in English as Roseline (simplified Chinese: 罗紫琳; traditional Chinese: 羅紫琳; pinyin: Luō Zǐlín; born June 6, 1987, in Shanghai, China) is a Chinese fashion model and beauty pageant titleholder who was crowned Miss Universe China 2011. She represented China at the Miss Universe 2011 pageant in São Paulo, Brazil and placed as the 4th Runner-Up. In the United States she is best known as a former contestant on The Face.

== Personal life ==
Roseline was born in Shanghai, China. She graduated with a degree in Tourism Management from Ouhua College in Shanghai in 2009. She has a personal blog about her pageant and personal experiences.

== Modeling career ==
Roseline started her career as a professional model in 2003, after being inspired by a biography written about Cindy Crawford. During her career, Roseline has done work for well-known brands such as Chanel, Bvlgari, Cartier, Gucci, Guess, Armani, FerrAgamo, Versace, Bottega Veneta, Louis Vuitton, Marc Jacobs, Chloe, agnès b., UPS and Qingdao Beer. She has also served as the brand spokesperson in Shanghai for the Shangri-La Hotel Jade 36 Bar. Roseline has participated in the 2012 New York Fashion Week New York Spring/Summer Fashion Week, the 2011 Shanghai Fashion Week, the China 2006 Fashion Week, the 2005 Singapore Fashion week and been a red carpet or VIP guest for a variety of brands such as Ferrari, Mercedes, Vertu and Coca-Cola. She earned second place in the 2003 Shanghai International Model Finals while still in high school, was the winner of the 2004 fifth CCTV Model Competition for the Hefei Region, and third runner-up overall in China for the 2004 fifth CCTV Model Competition National Finals. She has also walked for Dior.

Roseline competed in reality television series The Face which aired on Oxygen. She was the last standing member on the team of Naomi Campbell, and finished as a runner-up.

== Miss Universe China 2011 ==
Roseline, who stands 1.82 m (6 ft 0 in), competed in the Miss Universe China Pageant, held on July 10, 2011, at the MasterCard Center in Beijing, China. In addition to winning the Pageant, she was also chosen as Miss Popularity in on line voting on popular Chinese websites Sina.com, Tudou.com, Qiyi.com, PPTV, Netease and Youku. In August 2011, after the China Pageant, Roseline traveled to New York City for additional training including English training, Samba lessons and cultural immersion. The training was arranged by the National Director for Miss Universe China, Yue-Sai Kan, an entrepreneur, media icon and philanthropist. As the 2011 Miss Universe China, Roseline has received widespread media both in China and abroad, including: China Daily; Oriental Morning Post; CNN the Wall Street Journal and Forbes.

== Later career choices ==
She later represented China at Miss Universe 2011 held on September 12, 2011, in São Paulo, Brazil, where she placed in the Top 16, becoming the first delegate from China to place in the semifinals since 2002 and eventually finished as fourth runner-up. She wore a traditional costume similar to the dress worn in traditional Kun Opera which was created by famous designer Guo Pei. After competing at Miss Universe, Zilin participated in the reality show The Face on Oxygen where she was mentored by Naomi Campbell. She later finished as a runner-up with Margaux Brooke.

== Controversy ==
In June 2013, Roseline was fired from MIX Model Management for "unprofessional conduct and work ethic." Campbell, who also served as Roseline's mentor on The Face, tweeted, "#omiquotes The moment a person loses appreciation for the goodness others have done for them is the moment they begin their fall. Blsd day x" on June 2, 2013.

Awards and achievements
Preceded by (Philippines) Venus Raj	Miss Universe 4th runner-up 2011	Succeeded by (Brazil) Gabriela Markus
Preceded by Tang Wen	Miss China Universe; 2011	Succeeded by Xu Jidan
