= Li Zhenying =

Chinese model

- 李珍颖
- Born: Shanghai, China
- Beauty pageant titleholder
- Title: Miss Universe China 2016
- Hair color: Black
- Eye color: Black
- Major competitions: Miss Universe China 2016 (Winner); Miss Universe 2016 (Unplaced)

Joyce Li, also known as Li Zhen Ying (simplified Chinese: 李珍颖; traditional Chinese: 李珍穎; pinyin: Lǐ Zhēnyǐng; born August 4) is a Chinese model and beauty pageant titleholder who won Miss Universe China 2016 and represented China at Miss Universe 2016 but Unplaced.

== Miss Universe China 2016 ==
Joyce Li was crowned Miss Universe China 2016 by Jessica Xue, Miss Universe China 2015. The pageant was held on December 11, 2016, at the Shanghai Pudong Shangri-La Hotel Ballroom.

Awards and achievements
Preceded by Jessica Xue	Miss Universe China; 2016	Succeeded by Qiu Qiang
