= Fashion week =

Fashion industry event

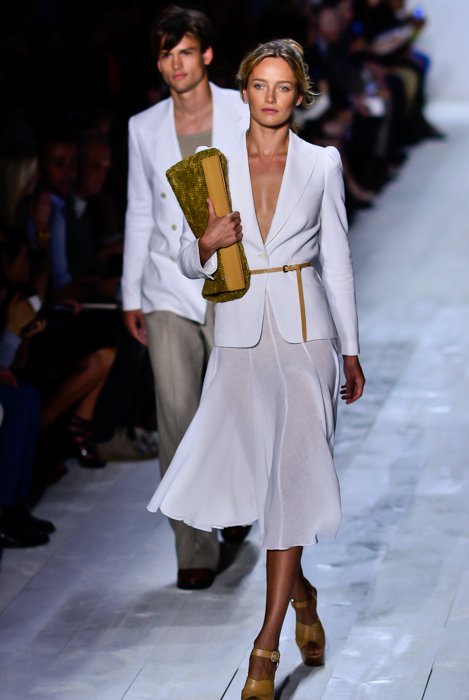
Karmen Pedaru modeling for Michael Kors, Spring/Summer New York Fashion Week, 2013

A fashion week is a week-long fashion industry event where fashion designers, brands, or "houses" display their latest collections in runway fashion shows to buyers and the media which influences upcoming fashion trends for the current and approaching seasons.

The most prominent fashion weeks are held in the fashion capitals of the world—in chronological order, New York City, London, Milan, and Paris. The collection of the fashion weeks in these capitals, accompanied by smaller fashion weeks elsewhere during this period, are referred to as fashion months.

The foundations of fashion week began in Paris in the late 1800s before spreading to New York, Milan, and London in the 20th century. What began as marketing garments in public spaces like racetracks grew into highly publicized events in themselves. In the 2000s, themes of sustainability began emerging at fashion weeks and grew popular across the next decade.

Fashion weeks in recent years have reflected a faster "retail cycle" with "see now, buy-now" and "in-season" fashion shows. Event organizers have proposed combining the collections for one season or men and women's wear shows to reduce the carbon emissions associated with these events. A recent example is of Paris Fashion week 2023–2024.

== History ==
One of history's first signs of a fashion week, or seasonal collection, can be traced back to fashion designer Charles Frederick Worth during the late 1800s. The concept of the fashion week began in Paris, when marketers used to hire women to wear couture items in public places, from racetracks to beauty salons. These parades gradually became social events of their own. In France, runway shows are still called "défilés de mode" which when translated literally means "fashion shows" or "fashion parades." A style show is an occasion placed on by a style planner to exhibit their forthcoming line of dress as well as embellishments during Fashion Week. Style shows debut each season, especially the Spring/Summer and Fall/Winter seasons.

The first Paris Fashion Week was due to the work of designer Paul Poiret. Poiret was known as the King of Fashion and led the fashion world in the first decade of the 20th century. He wished to present his designs on live mobile bodies. Poiret decided that to make this idea a reality he would combine socializing and shopping by throwing multiple galas featuring his pieces. Guests were asked to dress in their best clothing to align with his lavish designs. As the shows continued they became less of a large affair and the invitations became more individualized. Fashion week houses began to dress models in their collections in front of client-only guests. Unlike modern-day fashion shows photographers were prohibited due to tensions regarding copied designs.

The formation of the Fédération Française de la Couture marked the first official Paris Fashion Week in 1973. The show opened with the tension-building Battle of Versailles Fashion Show that displayed the famed battle between Paris and New York Fashion. The battle was set between five of the top French designers and five American designers with no famous backing.

In 1903, a Manhattan shop called Ehrich Brothers put on what is thought to have been the country's first fashion show to lure middle-class women into the store. By 1910, many big department stores were holding shows of their own. It is likely that American retailers saw the "fashion parades" in couture salons and decided to use the idea. These "parades" effectively promoted stores and improved their status. By the 1920s, the fashion show had been used by retailers across the country. They were staged, and often held in the shop's restaurant during lunch or teatime. These shows were usually more theatrical than those of today, heavily based upon a single theme, and accompanied by a narrative commentary.

On July 19, 1943, the first-ever "fashion week," New York Fashion Week, was held to give fashion buyers alternatives to French fashion during World War II, when workers in the fashion industry were unable to travel to Paris. Fashion shows were hugely popular, enticing crowds in their thousands – crowds so large, that stores in New York in the 1950s had to obtain a license to have live models. Until 1994, shows were held in different locations, such as hotels, or lofts. From 1994 to 2009, the event was held in a tent at Bryant Park, behind the New York Public Library. Lincoln Center was the Fashion Week venue from 2010 to 2015, after which it moved to Clarkson Square, an events venue in SoHo in Manhattan. After 2017, Clarkson Square was abandoned for a decentralized format.

=== Sustainability ===
Before mainstream fashion events like fashion week began incorporating sustainable fashion, brands like Patagonia practiced sustainability by designing garments out of recycled materials. The Copenhagen Fashion Summit was then established in 2009 to discuss social and environmental issues facing the fashion industry. Designers were called on to cut their total number of collections per year in exchange for more durable garments which extended lifespan and minimized waste. Similarly, buyers were encouraged to purchase fewer longer lasting pieces. These informal initiatives stimulate a circular economy.

In 2014, the Connect4Climate trust fund (owned by the World Bank Group)financed the “Sustainability Dialogues in the Design Industry” initiative at Milan Fashion Week to create opportunities for pioneering young designers. At London Fashion Week in 2017, Vivienne Westwood and the Mayor of London created the "Fashion Switch" initiative to support UK brands transitioning to renewable energy. In Asia, mindful fashion and conscious designer labels were promoted at Lakme Fashion Week 2018. Connect4Climate also launched “X-Ray Fashion,” a virtual reality experience exploring the relationship between climate change and the fashion industry. In the next year, brands like H&M, Burberry, and Zara followed in Patagonia's footsteps and started producing garments with sustainably sourced materials.

In 2019, initiatives like the “Fashion Pact” and “Fashion Industry Charter for Climate Action” articulated goals for the fashion industry around green energy, material use, and supply chain modernization to reduce carbon emissions. At London Fashion Week, the British Fashion Council promoted upcycling and remanufacturing by featuring new sustainable brands in designer showrooms. Influential brands like Chanel and Dolce & Gabbana showcased sustainable design in the Spring and Summer 2020 collections as well. The same year, Gabriella Hearst organized New York Fashion Week's first carbon neutral fashion show. She offset emissions, booked models already in the area, and hired caterers who used local ingredients. In May, designer Richard Marlone won the 2020 International Woolmark Prize for his radical ideas in sustainable development. Lakme Fashion Week also launched the Circular Design Challenge, the first sustainable fashion award in India.

Since 2021, advocacy groups have both attended and disrupted London Fashion Week and other major shows while calling for environmental and labor protections in the fashion industry. Organizers of Copenhagen Fashion Week 2023 set 18 minimum standards for the brands participating, an unprecedented decision. For example, seat cards and set pieces had to be recyclable, fur on garments was banned, and designs had to be 50% recycled material. Implementation of these rules was left up to the interpretation of designers, resulting in some variation due to the phrasing. Fashion week executives framed the standards as a transitional step to fully sustainable collections.

== About ==
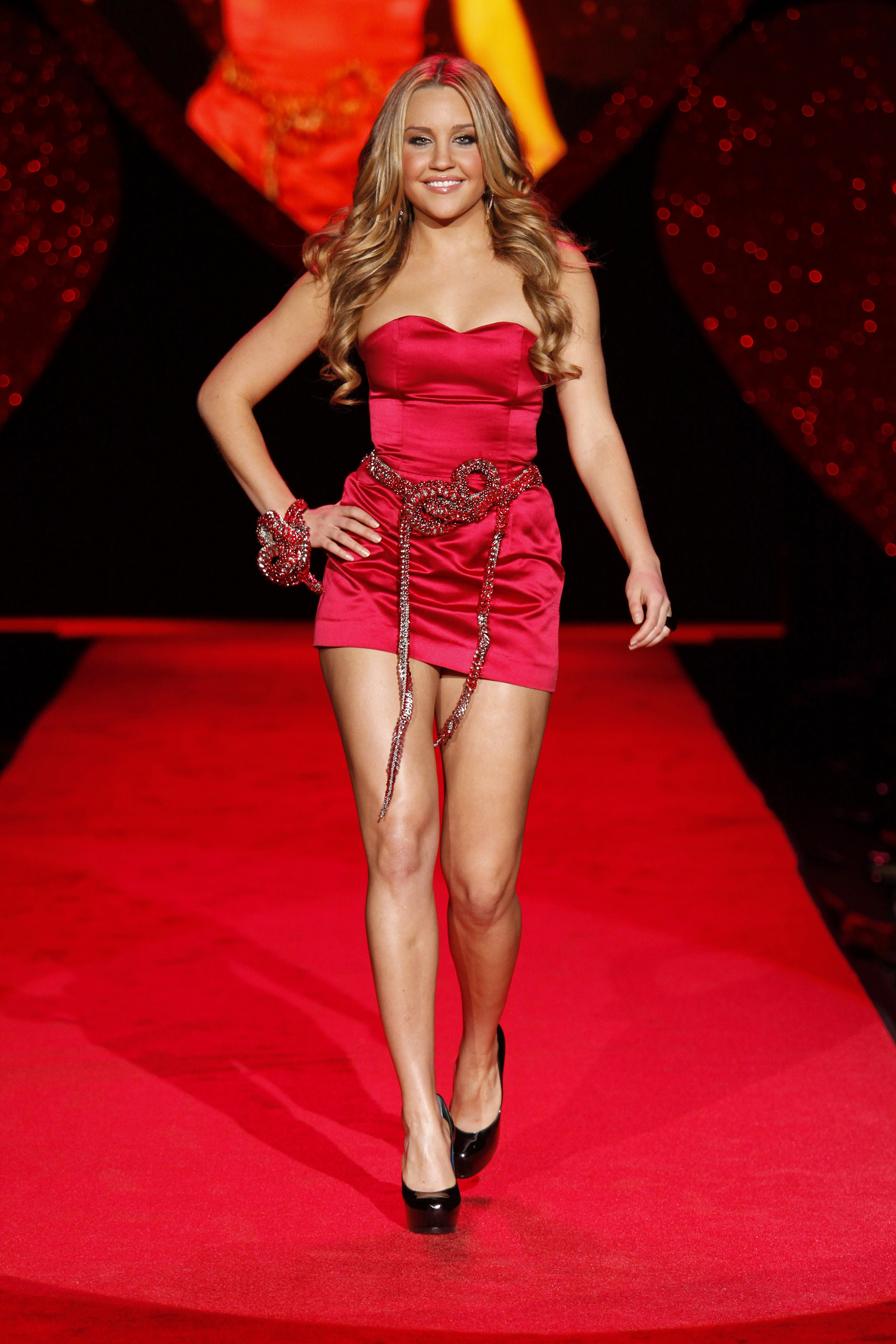
Amanda Bynes at New York Fashion Week, 2009

Although there are many notable fashion weeks around the world, only four are considered to be in the apex tier: in chronological order, New York (Manhattan), London, Milan, and Paris. Although key organizations still organize these main shows, there are independent events and producers in many other cities as well. Other notable fashion weeks are held in Copenhagen, Berlin, Madrid, Shanghai, and Tokyo.

=== Timing ===
Fashion months occur twice a year in the major fashion capitals of the world: New York (Manhattan), London, Milan, and Paris. Traditionally, fashion weeks were held several months in advance of the season to allow the press and buyers a chance to preview fashion designs for the following season. In February and March, designers showcased their autumn and winter collections. In September and October, designers showcased their spring and summer collections.

This timing was largely created to follow the then slower "retail cycle." In other words, it allowed time for retailers to purchase and incorporate the designers into their retail marketing. However, as customer expectations have increased, the retail cycle has increased. As a result, in 2016, designers started moving to "in-season shows."

=== See now, buy now ===
In recent years, shows have begun to feature garments that are available for sale immediately, online or in stores. The other move has been to "see now, buy now" shows, often featuring clickable video, where looks are available online immediately following, or even during the show. "See now, buy now" experiences have included shows from Tom Ford, Nicole Miller, Moschino, and Tommy Hilfiger. In the 2019 Tommy x Zendaya show, Hilfiger commented on the innovation of the "see now, buy now" concept. However, the French Federation of Fashion has not accepted the call to incorporate it as of 2017. The advent of "see now, buy now" shopping has also come about in response to so-called "fast fashion" retailers, who copy designs from the runway and bring them to retail faster than traditional design houses.

=== Environmental costs ===
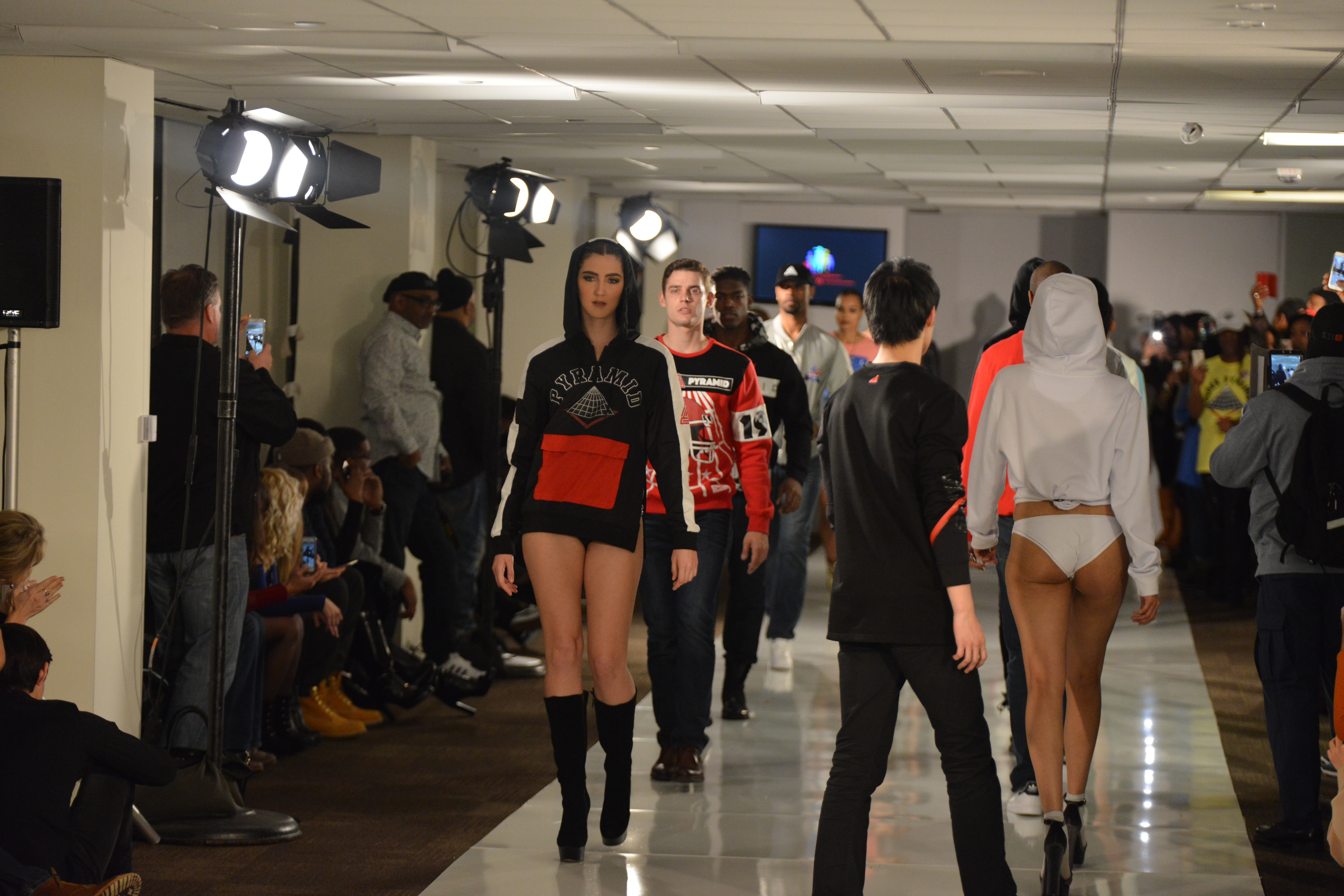
Male and female models on runway at a fashion show in Washington, D.C., February 2017

Since fashion weeks were established, approximately 241,000 tons of CO_{2} have been released each year from attending the "Big Four" and major trade shows. Buyers and sellers generate emissions and waste from air travel, accommodations, ground transportation, and fashion shows. 37% of total CO_{2} emissions are attributed to New York Fashion Week. The carbon footprint of the average global citizen is a fraction of the average professional buyer's from traveling approximately 19,213 km every year. On flights in business class, they generate up to 30% more CO_{2} emissions per person if the ratio of business seats to economy seats in each plane is taken into consideration. It is unrealistic for event organizers to ask guests to fly in economy class, take trains, or share accommodation, but paper invitations and plastic water bottles at events have become obsolete. Organizers for fashion week and other major events have also proposed combining all the collections for one season, displaying men and women's wear at the same event, and establishing fashion “districts” in fashion capitals like New York to minimize traffic congestion during fashion week. Practicing sustainability at fashion week encourages sustainable development in the fashion industry because it reflects and influences major trends and market demand.

== See also ==
- List of fashion events
- Fashion show
  - Runway (fashion)
- Fashion
  - Haute couture
  - Ready-to-wear
