= Jing An Shangri-La =

Hotel in Shanghai, China

- 上海静安香格里拉大酒店
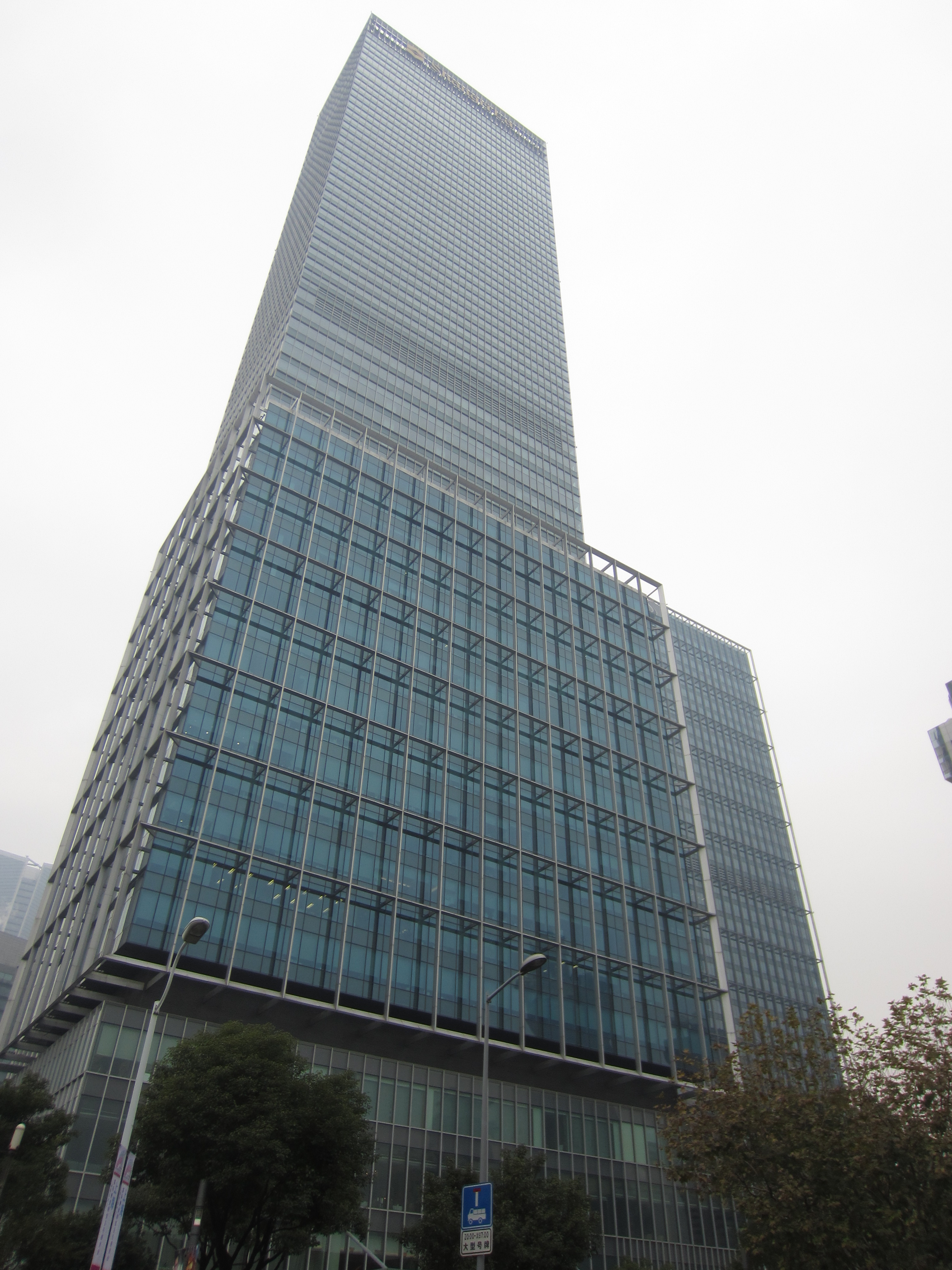

General information
- Location: Shanghai, China

The Jing An Shangri-La (Chinese: 上海静安香格里拉大酒店) is a luxury hotel located within the Jing An Kerry Centre in Shanghai's Jing'an District, in China. The hotel, which is part of the Shangri-La Hotels and Resorts chain, consists of 508 guest rooms within the centre's top 29 floors.

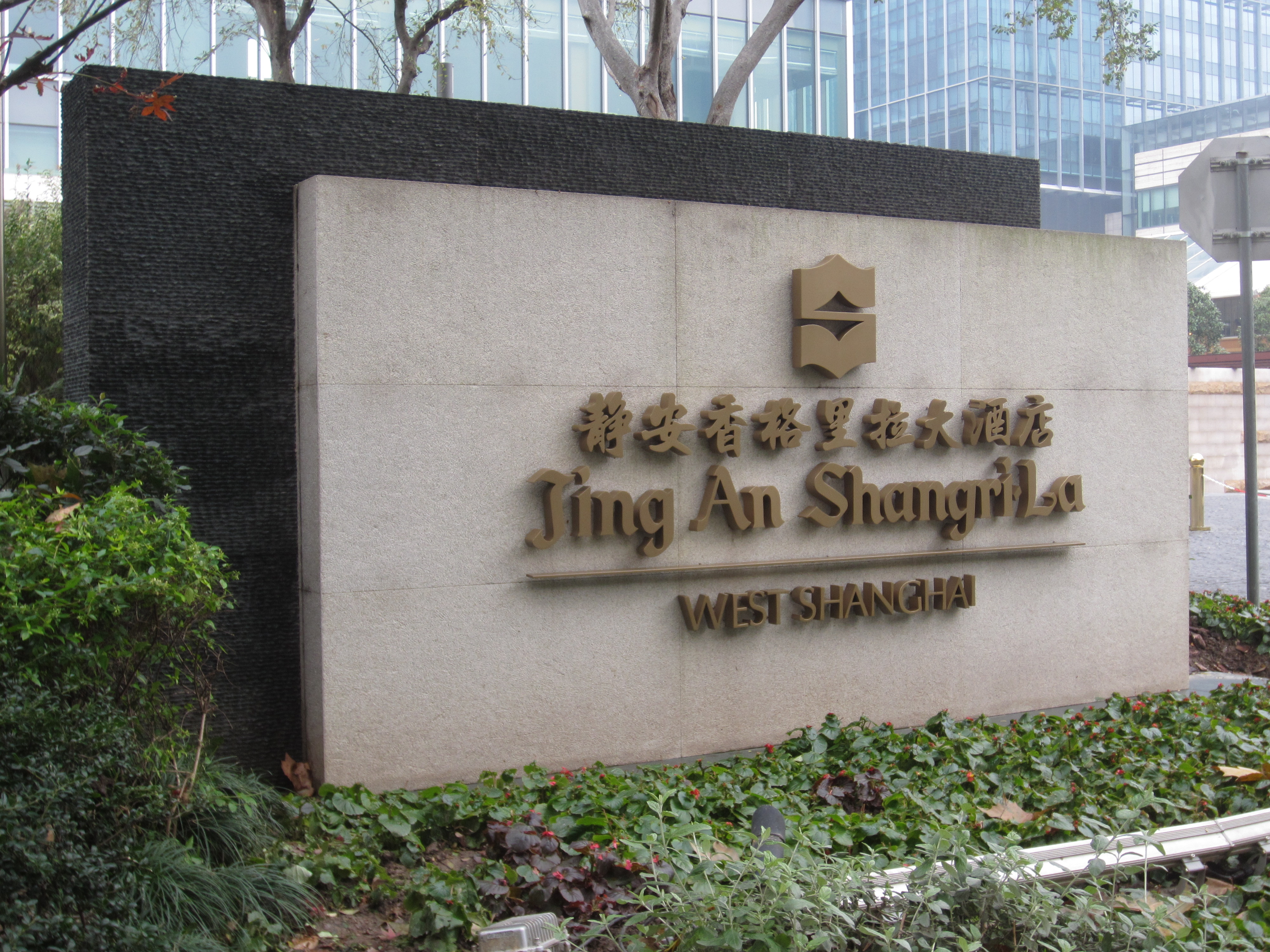
Signage, 2015
