= Hu Yanliang =

Chinese beauty pageant titleholder

Karen Hu
- Born: Hu Yanliang; October 10, 1990 (age 35); Beijing, China
- Height: 1.80 m (5 ft 11 in)
- Beauty pageant titleholder
- Title: Miss Universe China 2014 (Replacing Nora Xu)
- Hair color: Black
- Eye color: Black
- Major competitions: Miss Universe 2014 (Unplaced)

Hu Yanliang (simplified Chinese: 胡彦良; traditional Chinese: 胡彥良; pinyin: Hú Yànliáng; born October 10, 1990, in Beijing) also known as Karen Hu is a Chinese photographer, model and beauty pageant titleholder who was Miss Universe China first runner-up in 2014 session and represented her country at the Miss Universe 2014 pageant in the United States after the title was transferred to her from the original winner Nora Xu.

== Personal life ==
Hu is a photographer from Beijing and a model. She clinched second place in the NSR China Model Contest in 2011. Hu graduated from Beijing Film Academy.

== Pageantry ==
Hu represented Beijing at Miss China 2014 was placed as the first runner-up. Meanwhile, Nora Xu who represented Henan won the title of the pageant. During her reign, Nora Xu resigned from the title to pursue her studies at Donghua University, and Miss Universe China designated Hu as the new titleholder. She competed at the Miss Universe 2014 pageant representing China.

Awards and achievements
Preceded by Nora Xu (Resigned)	Miss Universe China; 2014	Succeeded by Jessica Xue
Preceded by Jin Ye	Chinese representative at Miss Universe; 2014	Succeeded by Jessica Xue
