= Probal Rashid =

Bangladeshi journalist

- প্রবাল রশিদ
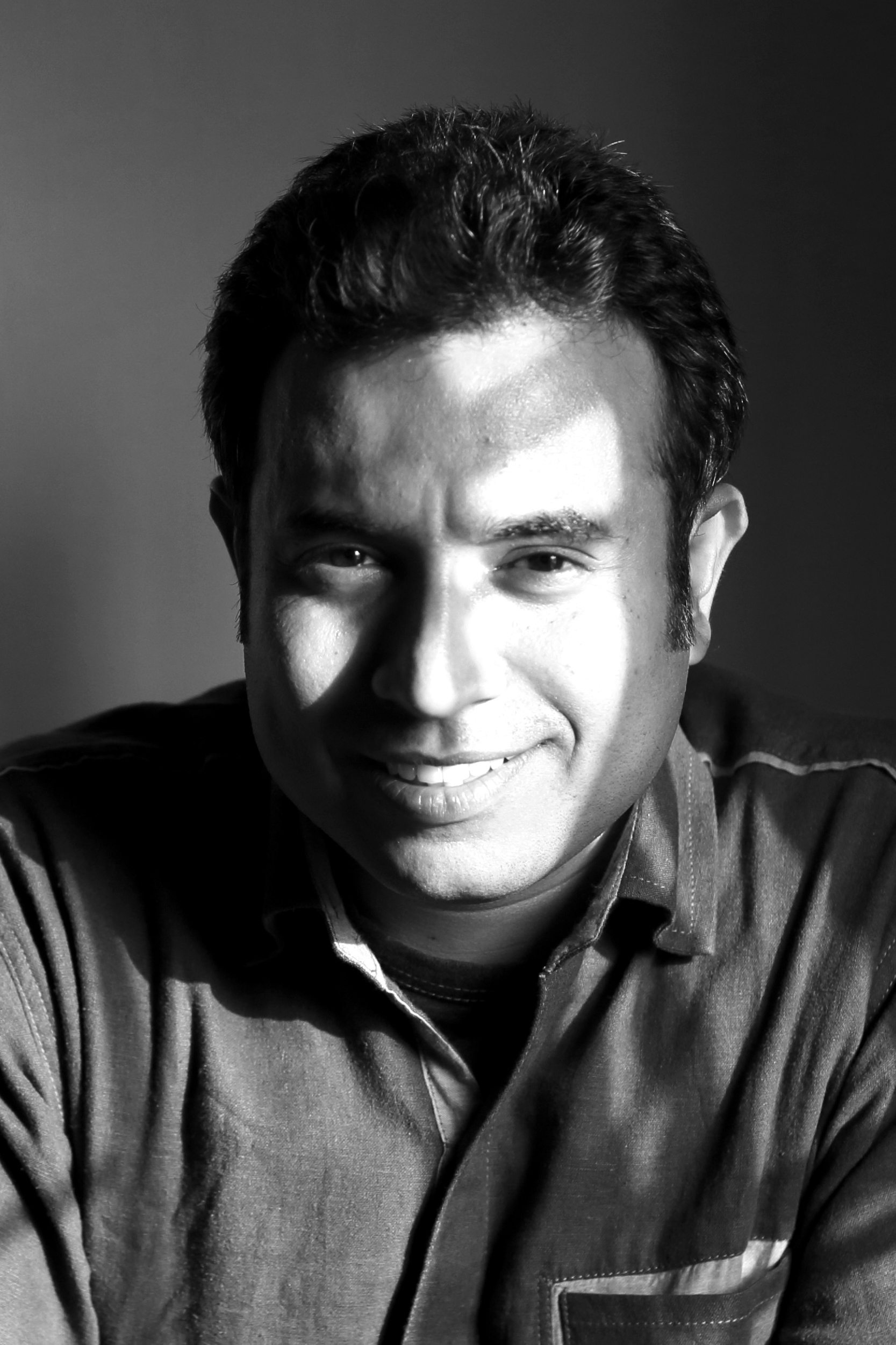
- Born: July 1, 1979 (age 47); Gazipur, Bangladesh
- Occupation: Photojournalist
- Years active: 2004–present
- Agent: Getty images Zuma Press
- Known for: Documentary photography, photojournalism
- Website: probalrashid.com

Probal Rashid (Bengali: প্রবাল রশিদ; born 1979) is a Bangladeshi documentary photographer and photojournalist based in Washington, D.C. He is a contributing photographer at Getty Images. His work has appeared in several magazines and newspapers.

== Early life and education ==
Rashid was born in Gazipur, Bangladesh, in 1979, and grew up there as the rural area urbanized and industrialized. He completed secondary school and a Bachelor's in Business Administration there. His middle-class parents wanted him to get a corporate job, so he moved to Dhaka, earned a Master of Business Administration, and started an internship with a financial aid company. He quit his job and in 2007 enrolled in a two-year course at Pathshala, a school of photography.

Rashid completed a post graduation diploma in photojournalism through a scholarship program of World Press Photo at the Konrad Adenauer Asian Center for Journalism (ACFJ) at Ateneo de Manila University in the Philippines.

== Career ==
For four years Rashid worked as a photographer at Bangabandhu Sheikh Mujibur Rahman Agricultural University. In 2014, he co-founded Absurd Photos, a co-operative photo agency in Dhaka. He is represented by American agency Zuma Press.

His work has been included in newspapers, magazines, and websites: Burn Magazine, Forbes, The Guardian, The Wall Street Journal, Daily Mirror, and HuffPost.

Probal is the recipient of numerous awards for his work, including the Pictures of the Year International (POYi), Days Japan Photojournalism Award, China International Press Photo Award (CHIPP), NPPA's Best of Photojournalism Awards, Yonhap International Press Photo Awards, KL International Photo Award, FCCT/OnAsia Photojournalism Award, "Zoom-in on Poverty" Global Photo Award, CGAP microfinance photo award, WPGA Annual Pollux Awards in the U.K., International Year of Biodiversity Award, and the Atlanta Photojournalism Seminar Contest.

== Awards ==
- Public Prize from the Days Japan International Photojournalism Award 2012.
- Awards of Excellence from the NPPA's the Best of Photojournalism Awards 2013, USA.
- 2nd prize in the Feature Story category of the 2015 Atlanta Photojournalism Seminar Contest
- 2nd prize in Editorial- Photo Essay and Feature Story category of the International Photography Awards (IPA).
- First place in 7th annual FCCT / LightRocket Asia-Pacific Photojournalism Contest in feature photography 2015, Philippines.
- Award of Excellence, World Health Division, 72nd Pictures of the Year International (POYi) 2015, USA
- Honourable Mention in the Portrait category of the NPPA's the Best of Photojournalism Awards 2015, USA.
- Honourable Mention in the Pictorial category of the NPPA's the Best of Photojournalism Awards 2015, USA.
- The FCCT-LightRocket Asia-Pacific Photojournalism Contest.
- Gold Prize in the Daily Life Category of the 4th Asian Press Photo Contest, China
