= Connect4Climate =

Program from World Bank Group to encourage climate action

- Type: Multi-Donor Trust Fund
- Headquarters: Washington, D.C., United States of America
- Region served: Worldwide
- Members: The World Bank Group, Italian Ministry of Ecological Transition, German Federal Ministry for Economic Cooperation and Development
- Program Manager: Giulia Braga
- Parent organization: The World Bank Group
- Website: connect4climate.org

Connect4Climate is a global partnership program of the World Bank Group dedicated to engaging diverse audiences through creative climate communications campaigns. Its goal is to accelerate and consolidate climate action in pursuit of a sustainable future.

The organization’s efforts are geared primarily towards raising climate awareness with innovative storytelling techniques such as virtual reality and collective poetry, by amplifying youth voices and increasing climate literacy, and through collaborations on creative advocacy campaigns with its network of over 500 partners.

== History ==
The Connect4Climate (C4C) program was founded by Lucia Grenna in 2011 as a means of driving communication around climate change. It launched with a photo and video competition that invited African youth to share their stories about climate change in the run-up to that year’s United Nations Climate Change Conference. In all, 54 prizes were awarded to the best of 700 submissions from every country on the African continent.

Since then, C4C has drawn attention to climate issues via events in Vatican City to New York City; films such as Youth Unstoppable and The Great Green Wall;technology such as the X-Ray Fashion virtual reality experience; music such as that of Mali’s Inna Modja; partnerships with surfers, Formula E racers, and other athletes; and youth outreach efforts like the 2020-21 #Youth4ClimateLive Series and social media “youth takeovers” around the world.

Though based in the World Bank Group headquarters in Washington, D.C., the Connect4Climate team, led by Program Manager Giulia Camilla Braga, is globally distributed and regularly supports multinational events held in Africa, Europe, Asia, and South America. C4C frames its objective to take on climate change as an integral component of the World Bank’s mission to end global poverty, as those in poverty are statistically the least likely to have contributed to climate change and the most likely to suffer from it.

Both Connect4Climate’s objectives and those of the World Bank Group align closely with the United Nations’ Sustainable Development Goals—in particular, Goal 1 (“No Poverty”) and Goal 13 (“Climate Action”). The late C4C Climate Expert Max Thabiso Edkins and his successors have made UN summits and meetings among Connect4Climate’s largest collaborations each year.

=== Events ===
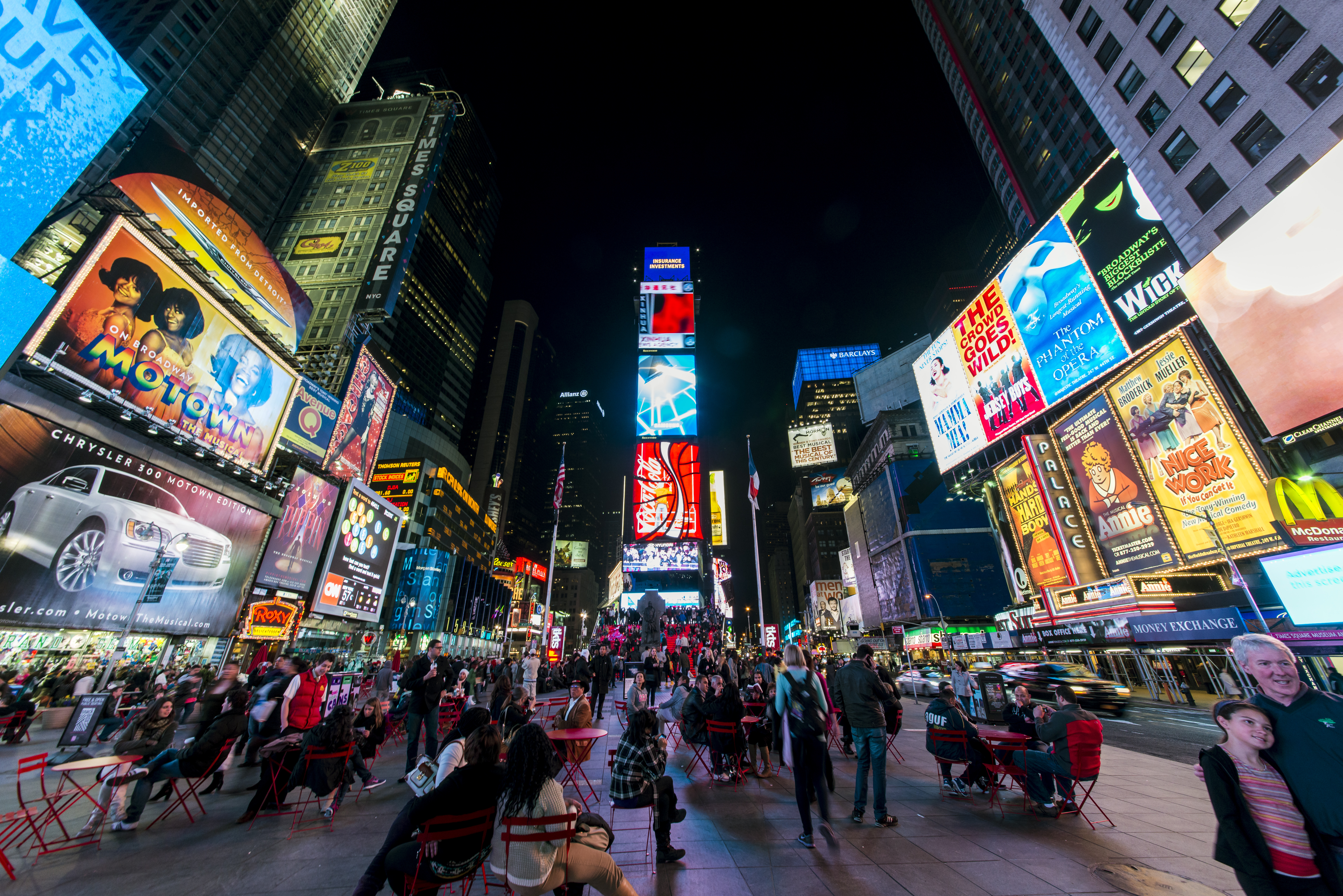
Times Square at night

As a part of its global outreach strategy, Connect4Climate has teamed up with partner organizations on many occasions over the years to host awareness-raising events around the world.

These include:

- Times Square Takeovers (2013, 2014): In 2013, a C4C project with MTV, Autogrill, and Artists’ Project Earth saw a call-to-action video featuring the-World Bank Group President Jim Yong Kim and a musical performance with Eminem and Kenyan hip-hop group TS1 (the winners of a recent C4C video competition) play every two minutes on two jumbo screens for a full day in the heart of New York City. The following weekend, the video was shown on 125 screens in other public venues across the U.S.
- The next year, C4C and MTV Voices once again took over two screens on Times Square, this time for a full week, to present a thirty-second compilation of the hundreds of shorts by international young filmmakers for C4C’s Action4Climate competition.
- Global Citizen 2015 Earth Day: Connect4Climate joined the Earth Day Network and the Global Poverty Project for Global Citizen 2015 Earth Day, an event that drew more than 270,000 people to the National Mall in Washington, D.C. to raise awareness of the interrelated issues of world poverty and climate change and drive concrete action to put an end to them.
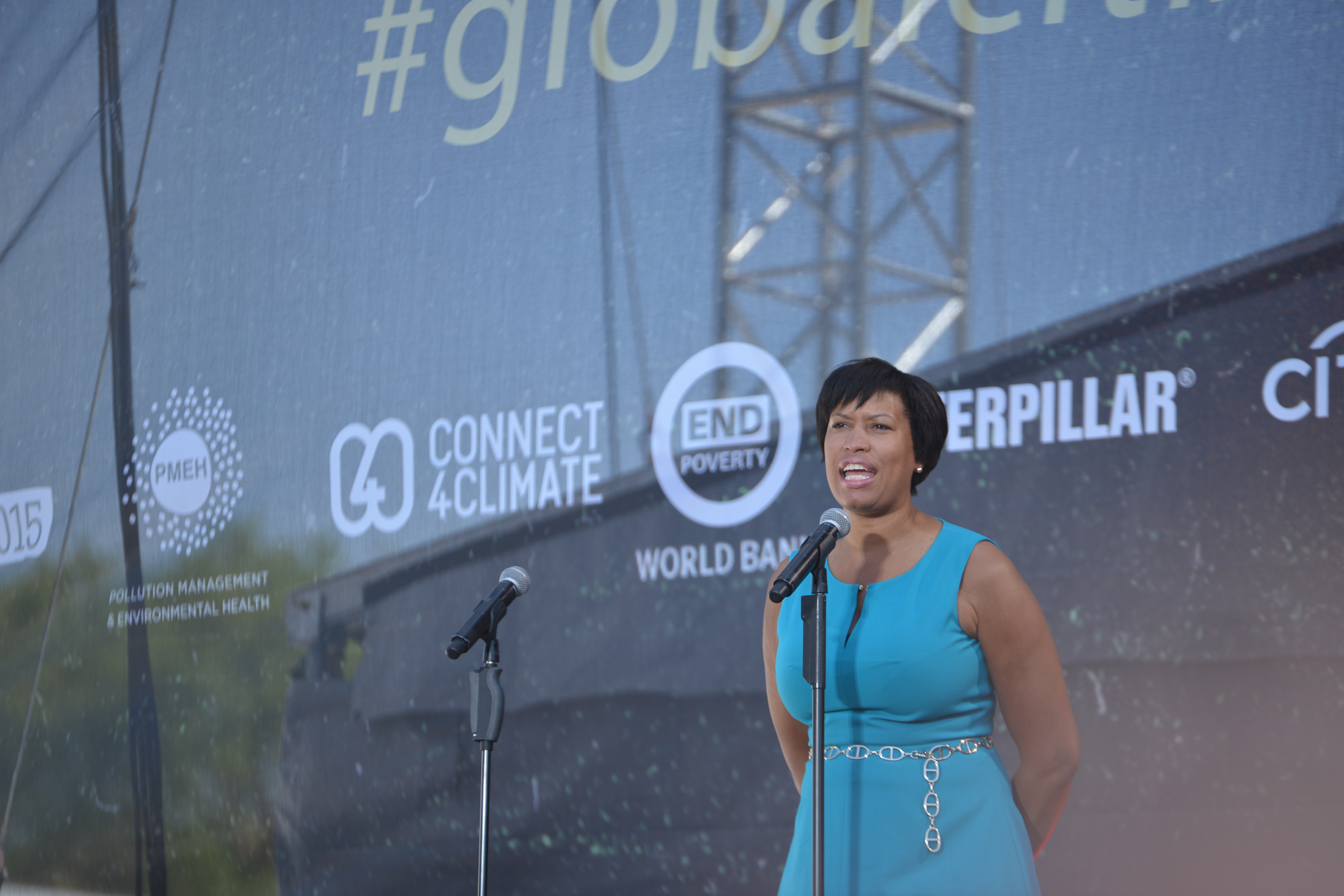
  Global Citizen 2015 Earth Day
- Fiat Lux (2015): A coalition convened by Connect4Climate presented a gift of contemporary public art entitled “Fiat Lux: Illuminating our Common Home” to Pope Francis on the opening day of the Extraordinary Jubilee of Mercy. Consisting of imagery on the themes of climate change, human dignity, and Earth’s living creatures projected onto the facade of St. Peter’s Basilica in Vatican City, this artwork drew inspiration from Francis’s Laudato si’ encyclical and called on viewers to unite in support of our “common home.”

=== Competitions ===
Connect4Climate has made frequent use of international competitions to drive engagement on climate issues and highlight the achievements of climate champions from around the world.

These include:

- Voices Climate (2012): Connect4Climate partnered with MTV to host a photo, video and music video competition highlighting young people’s innovative approaches to the climate crisis. The launch event took place at the Newseum in Washington, D.C.
- iChange (2013): C4C and the TVN Media Group, along with various other media outlets and academic institutions, put together this competition calling on university students to submit compelling 30-second video messages on climate issues. The winning entry, submitted by students from the Lebanese American University, conveyed statistics on domestic water waste by way of a humorous scenario.
- Action4Climate (2014): Some 230 young filmmakers from 70 countries entered short films showing their perspectives on climate change in this competition hosted by C4C. The winning submission, titled “The Trail of a Tale,” came from Portugal’s Gonçalo Tocha and told the story of an individual in the near future writing a letter to the present with advice on how to tackle the climate crisis.
- Film4Climate Global Video Competition (2016): Building on the success of Action4Climate, the Film4Climate Global Video Competition called for inspiring short films by young people on modes of climate action. A total of 860 video submissions were received this time, from 155 countries. Taking first place was “Three Seconds” by filmmaker Spencer Sharp and spoken word artist Prince Ea, which reminds viewers of humanity’s incredibly brief time on Earth and drives home the importance of undoing the damage we have done to our planet.
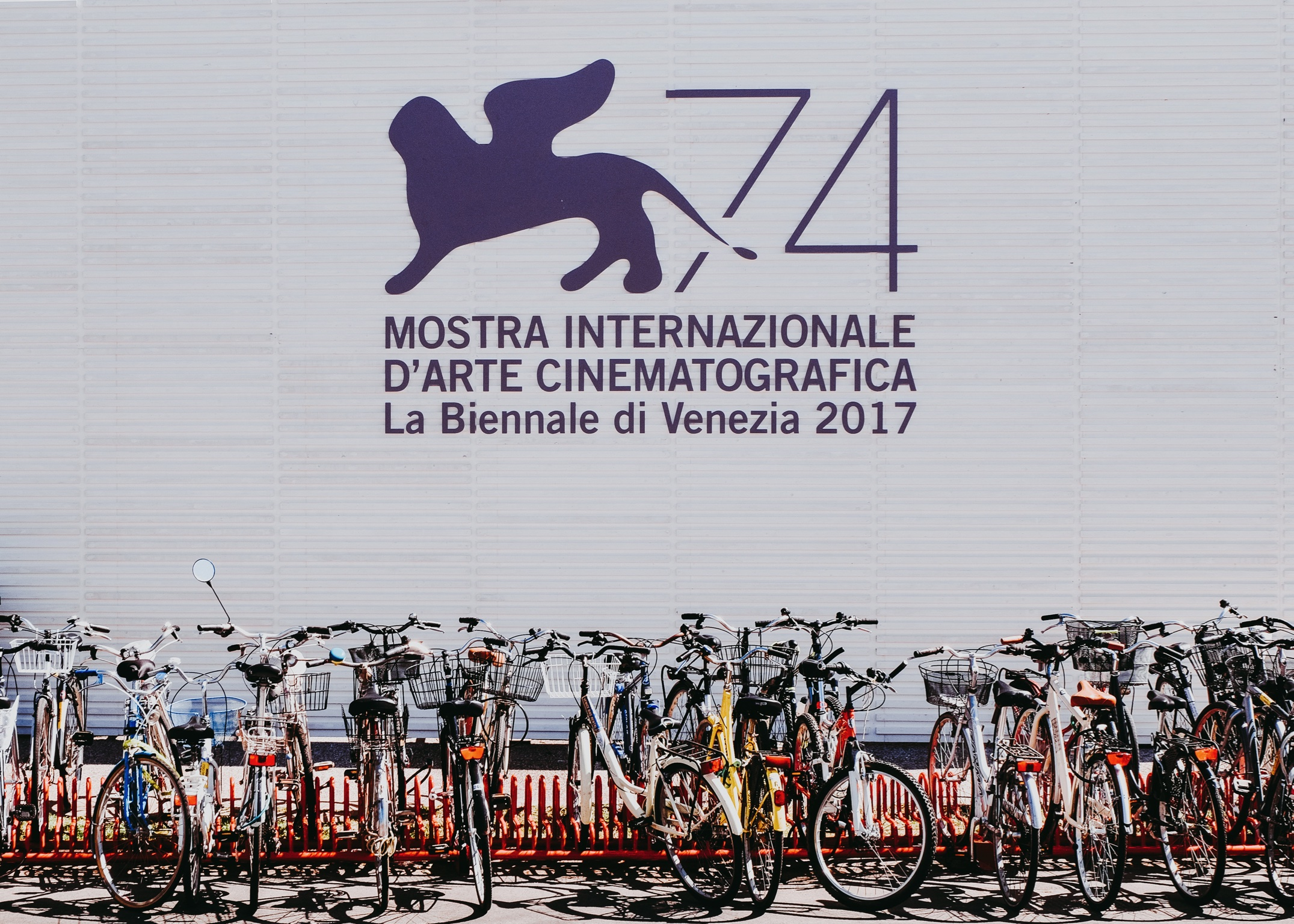
  74th Venice Film Festival
- Uniting Climate VR Pitch Competition (2017): This competition called on applicants to pitch a novel climate engagement concept harnessing the rapidly developing technology of 360-degree virtual reality. The winning pitch, which came from Denmark-based media and design studio MANND, was “X-Ray Fashion.” C4C, along with Paul G. Allen’s Vulcan Productions, subsequently worked with MANND to produce and distribute this inventive exposé on the wastefulness of the fast fashion industry. The installation premiered at Venice International Film Festival in competition as part of Venice VR. “X-Ray Fashion” has since become a core component of C4C’s Fashion4Climate initiative.
- All4theGreen Special Blue Prize (2017): Connect4Climate teamed up with the United Nations’ High-Level Panel on Water to launch the All4theGreen Special Blue Prize in search of original photographs capturing the importance of clean water in communities around the world. The winning entry came from Probal Rashid in Bangladesh, who photographed a child attempting to catch rainwater dripping from the eaves of homes in the village of Shyamnagar.
- D&AD New Blood Awards (2020-2021): The UK-based organization D&AD has long rewarded achievements in design and advertising through its New Blood Awards contest, which spotlights young people with compelling pitches. C4C partnered with D&AD for the first time in 2020, uploading a “Power Sustainable Lives” brief to which applicants could respond with original concepts for promotional strategies aimed at raising climate awareness and fostering concrete action.
- Connect4Climate is once again partnering with D&AD for the 2021 edition of the New Blood Awards with a brief entitled “Cheer on the Planet with Sport4Climate.”

== Advocacy ==
Connect4Climate frames its advocacy in terms of “initiatives,” each of which aims to raise climate awareness throughout a specific influential cross-section of global culture and harness the power of the creative industries to activate young audiences.

=== Fashion4Climate ===
Fast fashion is fueling the global environmental and climate emergency. Fashion4Climate focuses on empowering consumers to understand and decrease their ‘fashion footprint’ while encouraging industry leaders to embrace sustainable production practices and green their supply chains. C4C is a founding member of the United Nations Alliance on Sustainable Fashion, which seeks to contribute to the Sustainable Development Goals through coordinated action in the fashion sector. In 2018 C4C partnered with Vulcan Productions to produce the immersive virtual reality experience “X-Ray Fashion,” created by MANND and directed by Francesco Carrozzini, which premiered at Venice International Film Festival.

=== Film4Climate ===
Map of route of Great Green Wall, participating countries and Sahel

Filmmakers have long been on the forefront of social movements and the climate crisis presents a unique opportunity to harness the creativity of visual storytellers to call for greater ambition and spread climate literacy. Building on the inspiration of film producer Donald Ranvaud, Film4Climate works with the film industry to both promote sustainable messaging within content being produced and also push for sustainable practices and protocols within the production of film and TV. The Film4Climate initiative is perhaps best known for its work supporting Slater-Jewell Kemker documentary Youth Unstoppable, which tells the story of the rise of the global youth climate movement, and The Great Green Wall documentary, produced by UNCCD and executive produced by Fernando Meirelles, which profiles the campaign of the same name unfolding across the Sahel region of Africa.

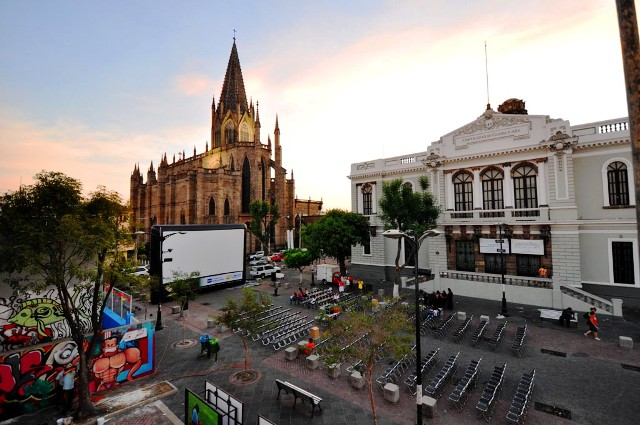
Guadalajara Film Festival

Film4Climate has longstanding partnerships with the Venice Production Bridge, Cannes’ Marché du Film, and Guadalajara International Film Festival, where they have organized panels, hosted screenings, and brought the climate conversation to the heart of the largest film industry gatherings. In partnership with Italian post-production house LaserFilm, they have hosted three editions of the Film4Climate Post-Production Award, which selects a work-in-progress film with a strong sustainable message to receive a full post-production package. Film4Climate has also coordinated with film commissions and advocacy groups (such as EcoProd, PGA Green, Green Film Shooting, Green Spark, and Cine-Regio) to develop sustainable production guidelines.

=== Music4Climate ===
Music4Climate looks to spread messages of climate action through the positive language of song. Most recently, Music4Climate has been supporting Malian vocalist Inna Modja and the other African musicians at the heart of The Great Green Wall film, which tracks Modja on an odyssey across the Sahel. Connect4Climate has also cultivated a relationship with the Mama Initiative, a group of young climate-minded musicians out of Berklee College of Music in Boston, featuring the group in Instagram Live sessions and otherwise collaborating with them on social media.

Previous Music4Climate activities have included partnering with UK charity Artists Project Earth, creators of the Rhythms del Mundo series of awareness-raising remix albums, and inviting the eco-minded band Capone & BungtBangt to headline a creative beach cleanup/jam session at the 2019 “COP of the Mediterranean” in Naples, Italy.

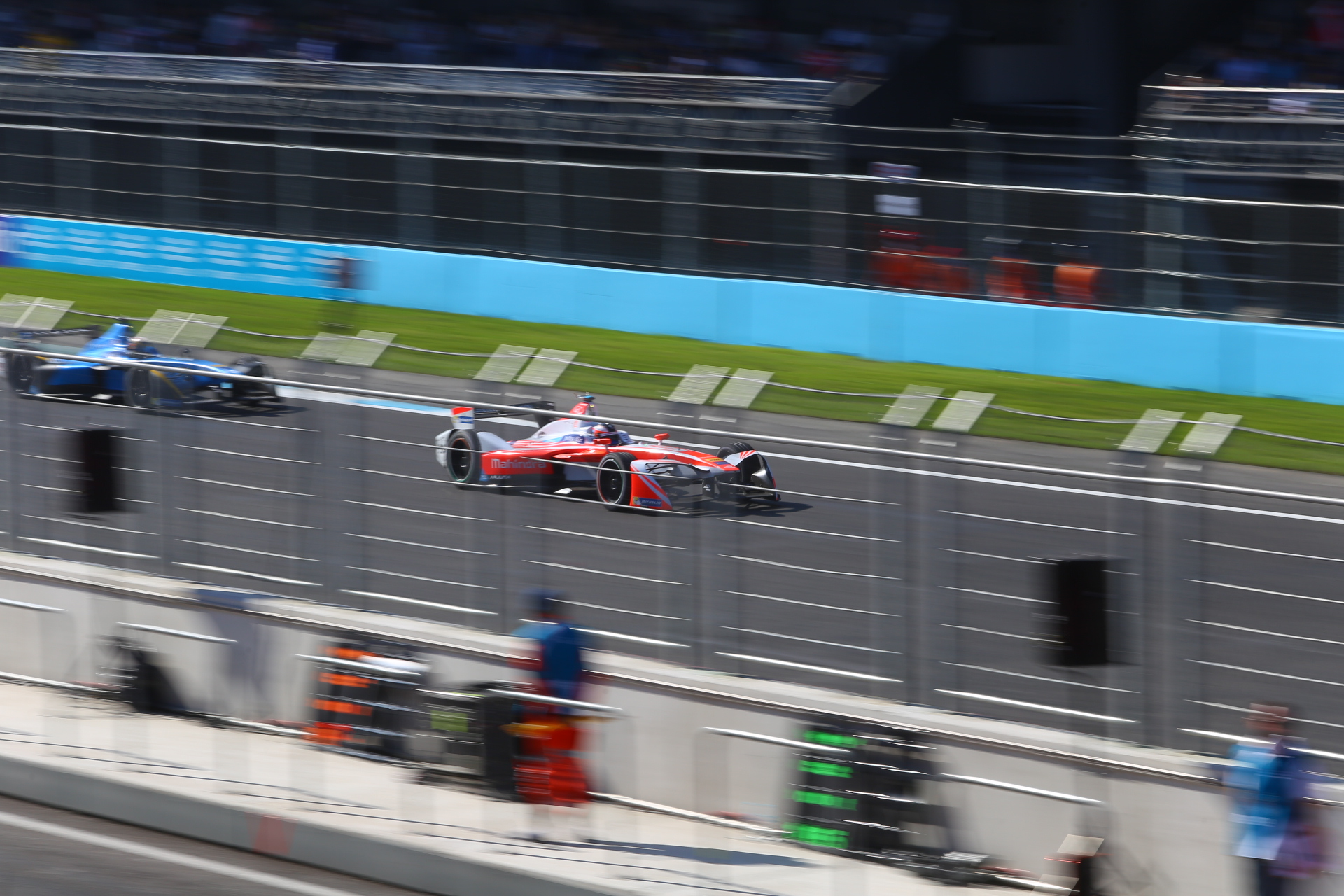
Formula E

=== Sport4Climate ===
Sport4Climate made its debut at 2014’s Interreligious Match for Peace in Rome, an event conceived by Pope Francis. The initiative recruits influential professional athletes to speak out for climate action and lead their fans by example. C4C’s recent Sport4 Climate work has focused on collaborations with Formula E electric auto racing and the International Olympic Committee, along with a “Let’s ride this wave together!” advocacy campaign enlisting professional surfers such as Victoria Vergara and Conor Maguire to speak out on ocean conservation. C4C’s network of ambassador athletes includes Olympian swimmer Allison Wagner, karate world champion Sara Cardin, and many more.

== Partnerships and Capacity Building ==
Connect4Climate maintains relationships with over 500 partner organizations. These ties include “knowledge partnerships” focused on the exchange of climate literacy tools and communication strategies as well as advocacy partnerships aimed at giving life to new on-the-ground projects and campaigns.

=== Knowledge Partnerships ===
Connect4Climate has formed hundreds of “knowledge partnerships” in line with its mission of building a global climate action community, and it regularly collaborates with partner organizations to develop events and other experiences. C4C has worked with international organizations such as the Earth Day Network, UN Climate Change, the IPCC, the UN Environment Programme, and Climate Cardinals; educational institutions such as Oxford University, Venice International University, and the University of Naples Federico II; athletic organizations such as the International Olympic Committee and Formula E; and private-sector companies ranging from Sony to Building Energy.

=== Youth4Climate ===
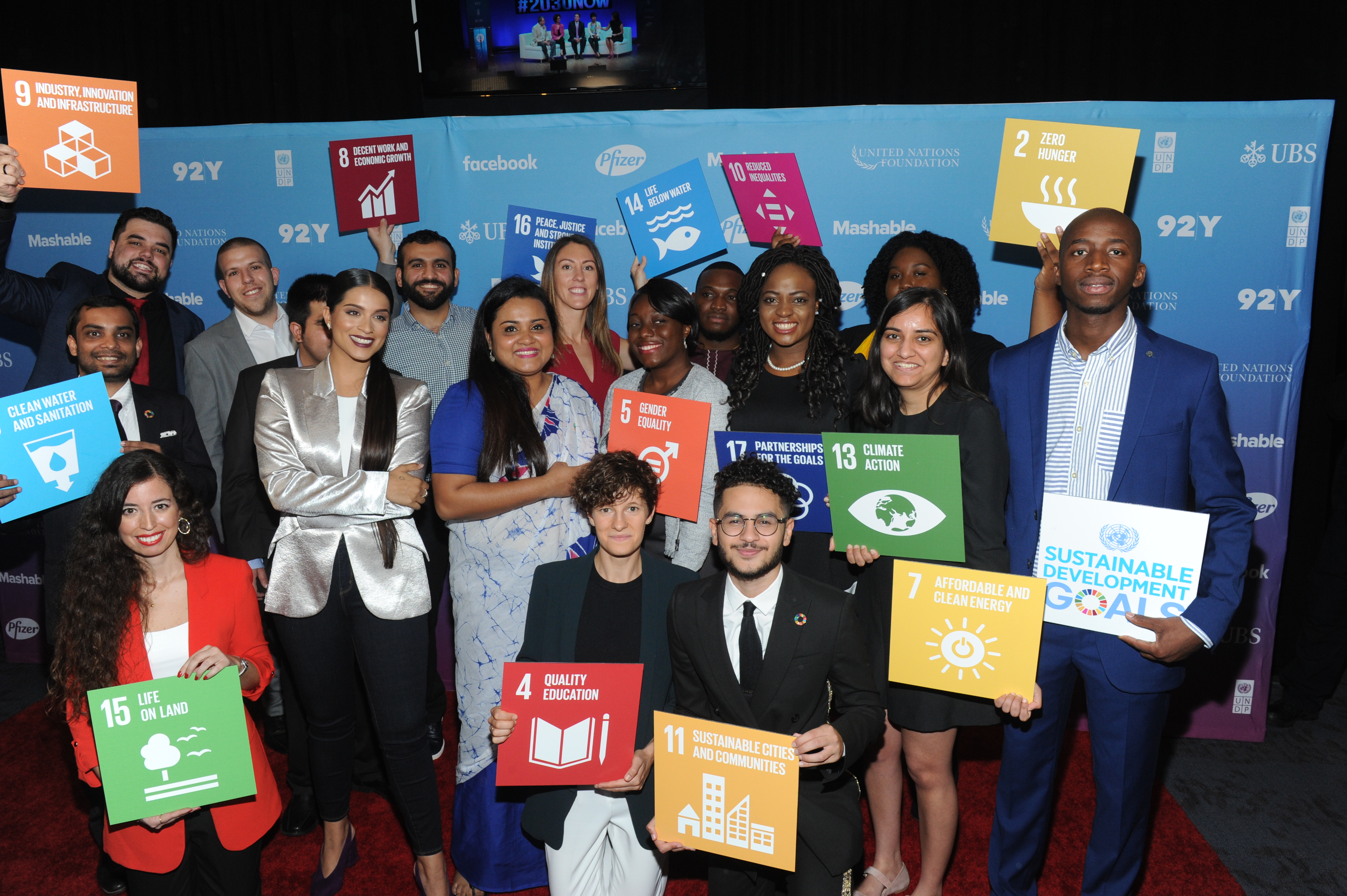
UN Youth Envoy Jayathma Wickramanayake (center) appeared as a guest on the "Driving Youth Action" episode of the #Youth4ClimateLive Series, and Ahmed Badr (kneeling right) co-hosted the Series with Salina Abraha

Since its inception, Connect4Climate has supported young leaders involved in the climate movement. Activities that amplify youth voices underpin all Connect4Climate initiatives, with programs such as #YouthTakeover and global youth video competitions focusing specifically on rising climate communicators.

With the ascendance of youth-led climate action campaigns c. 2018-2019—in particular Greta Thunberg’s worldwide School Strike for Climate movement—Connect4Climate’s outreach in this area has grown. C4C has cultivated relationships with on-the-ground leaders like Thunberg and Alexandria Villaseñor, supported young artists like documentarian Slater Jewell-Kemker, and collaborated with the UNFCCC on scaling up youth engagement and climate education around the annual UN climate summits.

In collaboration with the Office of the UN Secretary General’s Envoy on Youth and the Italian Ministry of Ecological Transition, Connect4Climate hosted monthly episodes of the #Youth4ClimateLive Series from June 2020 through February 2021. Featuring interactive intergenerational discussions that brought together policymakers and young leaders on the forefront of creative climate action, the series was conceived as a means of building momentum towards the 2021 Pre-COP Youth4Climate: Driving Ambition event in Milan and COP26. To complement the series, Connect4Climate developed an Educational Toolkit that teachers, students and parents can use to enhance climate literacy and embed climate learning in all classroom activities.
