= Kira Dikhtyar =

Russian-American fashion model (born 1988)

- Кира Дихтяр
- Born: 1988 (age 37–38); Moscow, Russian SFSR, Soviet Union
- Citizenship: Russia; United States
- Education: Moscow State University
- Years active: 2005–present
- Modeling information
- Height: 1.77 m (5 ft 10 in)
- Hair color: Brown
- Eye color: Green
- Agency: Photogenics Model Management; MC2

Kira Dikhtyar (Russian: Кира Дихтяр; born 1988) is a Russian-American fashion model, actress, and former rhythmic gymnast. She represented the Russian Federation in international rhythmic gymnastics before transitioning to a modeling career in the United States, where she was represented by Photogenics Model Management and later by MC2. She is the founder of the production company 90-60-90.

== Early life and education ==
Kira Dikhtyar was born in 1988 in Moscow, Russia. She began training in rhythmic gymnastics in early childhood and, at the age of nine, won a gold medal at the 1998 Junior Olympic Games. She subsequently joined Russia's junior national gymnastics team and trained at the Novogorsk Training Center, where she was coached by Irina Viner.

At the age of 15, Dikhtyar was scouted as a model in the Moscow Metro and began appearing in Russian fashion shoots, including work at the agency run by photographer Aleksandr Borodulin. She subsequently enrolled at Moscow State University to study geopolitics but did not complete her degree, moving to the United States at the age of 17 to pursue a modeling career.

== Career ==
=== Modeling ===
Dikhtyar began her American modeling career in Los Angeles, where she was signed by Photogenics Model Management, a modeling agency run by Nicole Bordeaux, and appeared in a series of Nike and other sports campaigns. Her first major fashion campaign was for Abercrombie & Fitch, photographed by Bruce Weber, and in June 2006 she appeared in an editorial titled "In Great Shape" for the Italian edition of Vogue, shot by Ellen von Unwerth. Dikhtyar was later represented in the United States by MC2 Model Management, an agency founded by Jean-Luc Brunel. Over the course of her career, she has appeared in editorials and on the covers of more than fifty international publications, including Harper's Bazaar, L'Officiel, Marie Claire, Vanity Fair, Cosmopolitan, GQ, Elle, Glamour, InStyle, FHM, Maxim, and Playboy. She has worked with photographers including Patrick Demarchelier, Rankin, Tony Duran, Ellen Von Unwerth, Bruce Weber, and Francesco Carrozzini.

=== Television and film ===
In 2014, Dikhtyar was a contestant on the second season of the American fashion reality competition The Face on the Oxygen network, joining "Team Naomi" under coach Naomi Campbell. She was eliminated mid-season after a televised on-set dispute with contestant Afiya Bennett.

Dikhtyar later founded the production company 90-60-90, which has filmed fashion events and produced music videos including Tyga's "Servin' Dat Raw." In 2016, she co-starred with model and actress Eugenia Kuzmina in the reality program Model Moms. She played the role of Oksana in Michael Canzoniero's independent comedy-drama Making the Day, which premiered at the 2021 Cinequest Film Festival opposite Steve Randazzo and Dan Fogler.

=== Activism ===
Dikhtyar has been involved in activism focusing on sexual violence. On Russian state television, she publicly accused a former oligarch of raping her. Following the broadcast, Dikhtyar launched a public campaign calling for age of consent laws to be raised to 18 in Russia and worldwide and for greater accountability for powerful men who abuse minors.

=== Business ===
In 2022, following the Russian invasion of Ukraine and the withdrawal of Western retailers including Zara, H&M, Burberry, Chanel, and Hermès from the Russia, Dikhtyar relocated from New York City to Moscow to launch a new clothing line modelled on inexpensive replicas of the departed brands.

== Filmography ==
- The Face (2014)
- Making the Day (2021)
