= Zhang Meng =

Zhang Meng may refer to:

- Zhang Meng (warlord) (fl. 206–210), an administrator in the military history of the Three Kingdoms
- Zhang Meng (director) (born 1975, 张猛), Chinese director
- Alina Zhang or Zhang Meng (born 1981, 张萌), Chinese actress
- Lemon Zhang or Zhang Meng (born 1988, 张檬), Chinese actress
- Zhang Meng (footballer, born 1983), Chinese footballer
- Zhang Meng (murder victim) (1966–2008), Chinese woman murdered in Singapore
- Zhang Meng (swimmer) (born 1996), Chinese Paralympic swimmer
