= Yue-Sai Kan =

American television host and producer

- 靳羽西
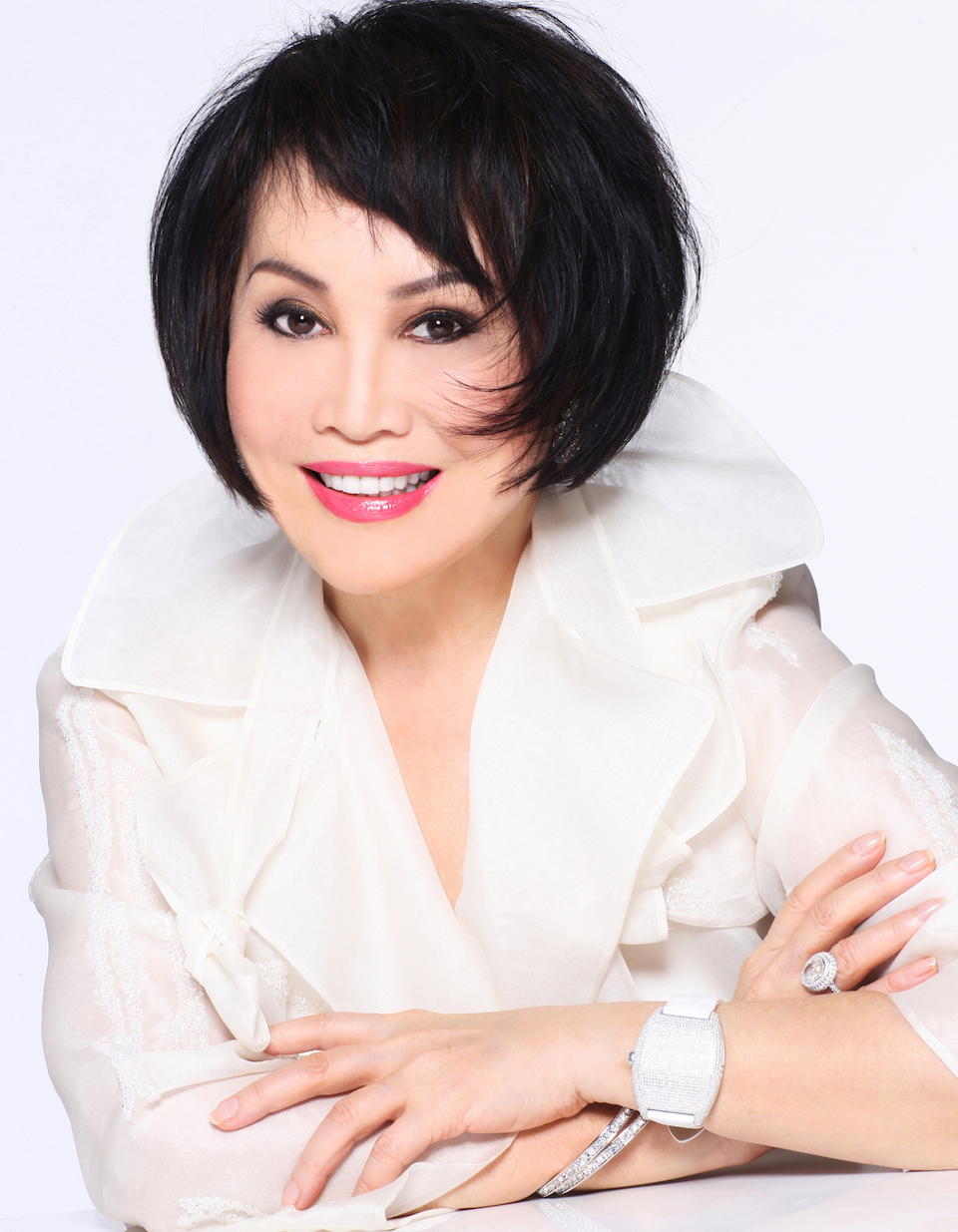
- Photo by Fadil Berisha
- Born: October 6, 1947 (age 79); Guilin, Guangxi, China
- Other name: "The Oprah of China"
- Citizenship: American
- Education: Brigham Young University–Hawaii
- Known for: TV personality, Entrepreneur, Bestselling Author, Director of Miss Universe China
- Relatives: Kan Wing-Lin
- Website: www.yuesaikan.com

Yue-Sai Kan (Chinese: 靳羽西; pinyin: Jìn Yǔxī; Jyutping: gan3 jyu5 sai1) (born October 6, 1947) is a Chinese-American television host, producer, author, entrepreneur and humanitarian. In 1987, People magazine described her as "the most famous woman in China," a description later used by other outlets. In 2020, The Wall Street Journal described her as the "Oprah of China."

Kan moved to New York City in 1972 and created her TV series "Looking East" which introduced Asian cultures to an American audience. In 1984, she hosted the first live broadcast from China on PBS, and later launched "One World" on China's national TV network CCTV, achieving widespread recognition in China and inspiring many to learn English and explore the world.

Kan launched the Yue-Sai cosmetics brand in 1992, promoting a positive self-image for Chinese women and becoming a leading cosmetics company in China. In 2008, she founded the House of Yue-Sai, an East-meets-West lifestyle retail brand. She also created Yue-Sai WaWa, a line of dolls with distinct Asian features, aimed at fostering cultural pride in Asian children.

Kan is the author of eleven books, including best-selling titles in China on television production, beauty, and etiquette.

Kan was the only living American to be featured on a government-issued Chinese postage stamp. She continues to serve as a cultural ambassador and holds positions in several international organizations.

== Early life ==
Kan was born in Guilin, China and grew up in Hong Kong. Her father, Kan Wing-Lin, was a traditional Chinese painter and calligrapher.

In 1966, aged 19, while studying as a piano major at Brigham Young University–Hawaii in Hawaii, Yue-Sai entered the Narcissus Flower Beauty Pageant sponsored by the local Chinese Chamber of Commerce. She became the second runner-up, and as part of her duties traveled internationally.

== Television career ==
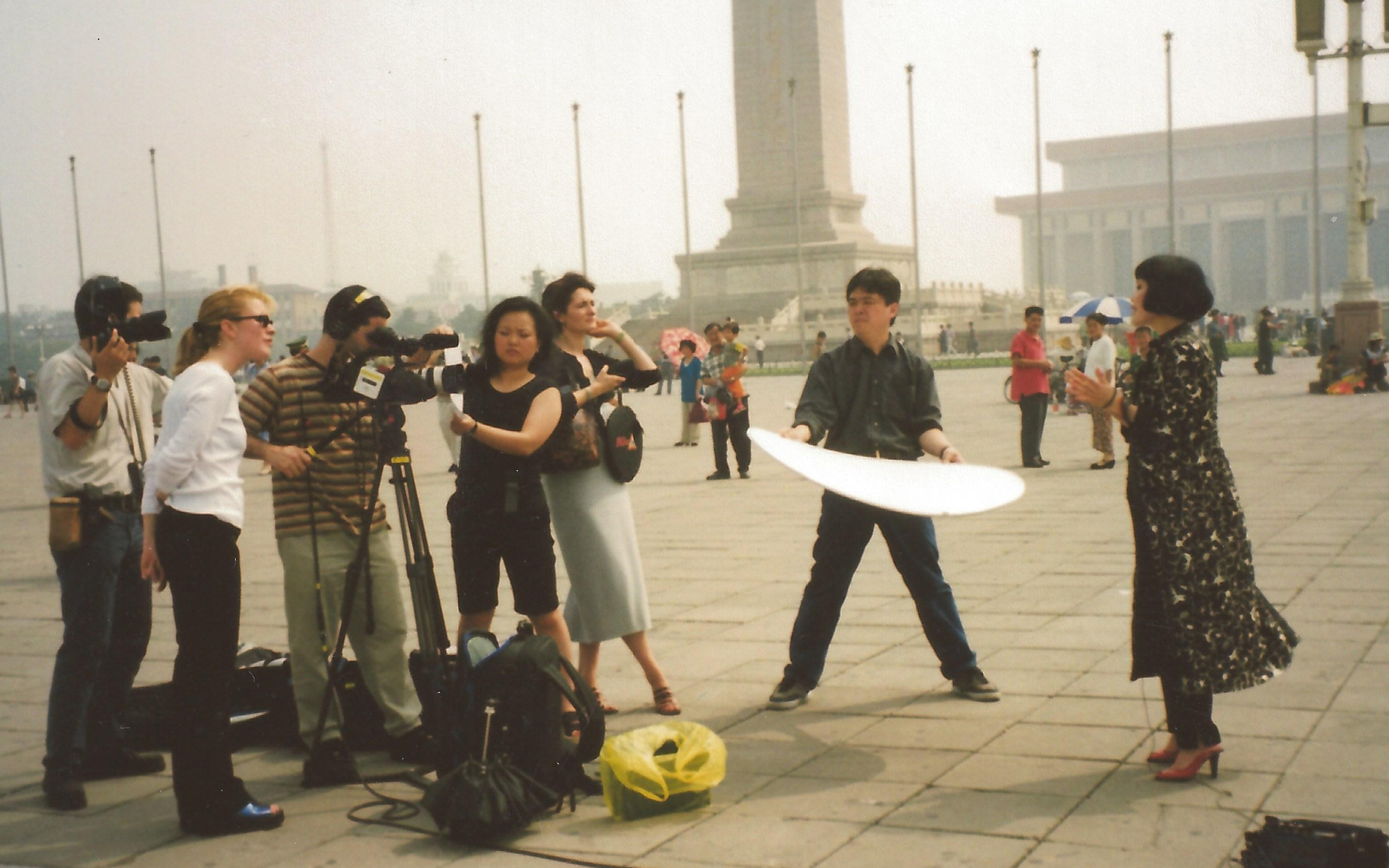
Kan with her production crew were filming One World in Beijing

In 1972, Kan moved to New York City. Soon after, she formed Yue-Sai Kan Productions and created her first major TV production, a weekly series called "Looking East". The program was the first of its kind to introduce Asian cultures and customs to a growing and receptive American audience. It garnered critical acclaim and won awards. As described in The New York Times: "Few people are able to bridge the East and West, but Yue-Sai Kan can, and does it with beauty, intelligence and grace." The series stayed on the air for 12 years, the last 2 years on the Discovery Channel. Based on this and other work, Kan is credited as the first TV journalist to connect the East and West.

In 1984, PBS invited Kan to host the first live broadcast from China on the 35th Anniversary of the People's Republic of China. The inaugural US-China joint telecast led to many collaborations between the two countries' television industries. Two years later, the bilingual television series "One World" produced and hosted by Kan aired on China's national television network CCTV-1, with a weekly viewership of 300 million, giving many Chinese their first glimpse of the outside world. Her broadcast made her a household name in China and inspired millions of young people to learn English and travel abroad. At that time, with broadcasts in both China and the US, Kan was the most watched woman in the world. The bilingual scripts and videos of "One World" were used as teaching materials in schools across China and her easy hosting style influenced TV journalists in China.

Kan's other US TV credits include narrating the ABC documentary "China: Walls and Bridges", which received a Daytime Emmy Award.

"Journey through a Changing China" was syndicated across the country and was so powerful that it was publicly lauded in the US Congressional Record, which called Kan a "citizen ambassador".

"Mini Dragons" and "Doing Business in Asia", which Kan produced and hosted, were broadcast on PBS. A corporate version of the series was created and thousands of copies were sold to corporations and university business schools throughout the world for many years.

Kan has continued to produce a variety of television shows aimed at raising the Chinese consciousness about the latest international lifestyle trends, including segments for the popular CCTV program "Half of the Sky" and more recently "Yue-Sai's World" and "Yue-Sai's Expo". Kan has filmed in more than 25 countries and created thousands of programs.

== Entrepreneur career ==
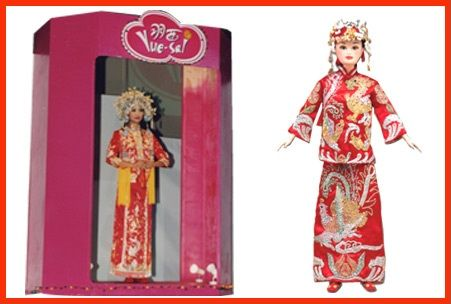
Kan designed and produced a line of Asian female dolls, known as the Yue-Sai WaWa ("doll" in Chinese).

In 1992, Kan transformed herself from a TV personality to an entrepreneur by creating the Yue-Sai cosmetics brand which became China's leading cosmetics company, eventually selling products in more than 800 outlets through 23 regional companies in China's major markets. The company encouraged Chinese women to be proud of their image, and was an early entrant to the cosmetics industry in China. More than 90% of the Chinese population today recognizes the brand, which was purchased by L'Oréal in 2004. Forbes reported that Kan "is changing the face of the Middle Kingdom, one lipstick at a time". Kan stayed on as the Honorary Vice Chairman of L'Oreal China.

In 2008, Kan created a new East-meets-West lifestyle retail brand, the House of Yue-Sai, selling a variety of fine home furnishings, bedding, tableware, lighting, decorative accessories, unique gifts and jewelry. Kan has also designed and produced a line of Asian female dolls, known as the Yue-Sai WaWa ("doll" in Chinese). Seeing that dolls sold in China had blue eyes and blond hair, Kan created dolls with distinctive Asian features, accessories and educational facts to help Asian children develop confidence, knowledge and pride in their heritage as well as educate children of all heritages about Asian cultures.

== Books ==
Kan is the author of eleven books, including best-sellers in China offering advice about television production, beauty, and etiquette.

Her first publication Yue-Sai's Guide to Asian Beauty teaches basic makeup and personal styling techniques.

Encouraged by the Chinese Ministry of Culture, Kan introduced international social standards to China with her book Etiquette for the Modern Chinese (2000).

The subsequent rewrites The Chinese Gentleman, in which she informs people how not to behave like peasants, and The Complete Chinese Woman served as virtual training manuals for volunteers at the 2008 Beijing Olympics and the 2010 Shanghai World Expo.

Exquisite Spaces, 25 Top Interior Designers of the World (2009) is a coffee table book featuring design philosophies and tips from world-class designers, and their works.

Life is a Competition (2013) and 99 Ways to Live a Charmed Life (2014) targeted young Chinese looking for advice in career, relationships and all-round development.

Kan's memoir, The Most Famous Woman in China, an English-language account of her career, was published in August 2024.

Kan's papers, dating from 1983 to 2021, are held by the Schlesinger Library on the History of Women in America at the Harvard Radcliffe Institute.

== Humanitarian work and cultural ambassador ==
Kan's philanthropic initiatives include a donation of nearly $200,000 to the United Nations World Conference on Women in Beijing in 1995 and a scholarship program set up in 1997 at Peking University for outstanding female students. Kan also built schools and libraries in underprivileged regions of China.

In 2002, UNICEF named her as its first and only Global Chinese "Say Yes for Children" ambassador.

As chair of the Soong Ching-ling Foundation's 2010 annual gala, Kan helped raise over $1.5 million to support 12 hospitals in remote regions of China. To acknowledge her tremendous contribution, the Shanghai Soong Qing Ling Foundation sanctioned the establishment of the China Beauty Charity Fund (CBCF) and appointed Kan as Ambassador and Chairman. The CBCF with its sister entity in the US is dedicated to the betterment and advancement of women and children through education, health and cultural programs worldwide.

Kan is a member of the Committee of 100. She is a member of the board of the Ellis Island Honors Society and Prince Albert of Monaco's Philanthropy Round Table. She is a member of the Metropolitan Museum of Art's International Council.

In early 2018, Kan became co-chair of China Institute in America, a non-profit organization dedicated to fostering a deeper understanding of China through programs in education, culture, art, and business. She shares the chairmanship with Chien Chung Pei, son of architect I. M. Pei.

In 2006, Kan began serving as Chairman of the Invitation Committee of the Shanghai International Film Festival (SIFF), the largest film festival in Asia. Her title changed to SIFF International Ambassador in 2015. Kan secured the attendance of nearly 50 international A-list filmmakers, including Oliver Stone, Daniel Boyle, Tom Hooper, Jean-Jacques Annaud, Quincy Jones, Halle Berry, Catherine Deneuve, Susan Sarandon, Adrien Brody, Claire Danes, Hugh Grant, Meg Ryan, Sophie Marceau.

Since 2011, Kan has served as the National Director of Miss Universe China, which she has moved to support education and charity, and create a positive image of Chinese women. She mentored seven Miss China titleholders, all of whom represented China well at the Miss Universe Final Pageant.

Kan also champions Chinese creativity via her annual China Fashion Gala in New York. The Gala boosted the international standing of Chinese photographers Chen Man and Sun Jun as well as designers Lan Yu, Grace Chen and fashion designer Jason Wu. Renowned Chinese couture designer Guo Pei's creations were picked up by the Metropolitan Museum of Art following her debut at the China Fashion Gala.

== Awards and recognition ==
Kan is the first and only living American featured on a government-issued Chinese postage stamp which was issued in 2002.

She received the Magnolia Award from the Shanghai municipal government for her contribution to the economic and social development of Shanghai.

She was named to the "20 Most Influential Women Around the Globe" by Xinhua News Agency.

"Yue-Sai Day" was established in Hawaii on October 6, 2012.

In 2014, Kan received the Ellis Island Medal of Honor as an outstanding Chinese American immigrant. In 2017, she received the Ban Ki-moon Award from Asia Initiatives.

== Personal life ==
Kan became a U.S. citizen in 1978.

Kan married James McManus in February 1990, 6 months after they had met. They divorced in 1997.

In 2015, Kan completed a $9 million renovation of her riverfront townhouse in Sutton Square, New York City. She listed it for sale in 2020 for $28 million. She reduced the price to $20 million in 2025.
