= Shanghai Fashion Week =

Fashion show in Shanghai

Shanghai Fashion Week is a fashion event held two times every year in Shanghai, each time lasting for seven days which is a part of Shanghai International Fashion Culture Festival which usually lasts for a month. The event first began in 2001.

Supported by the Ministry of Commerce, Shanghai Fashion Week is a business and cultural event hosted by the Shanghai Municipal Government. With more and more young designers and models, Shanghai Fashion Week is aiming to build up an international and professional platform and attract top design talents from all over the world.

== Yearly events ==
The current organizer of Shanghai Fashion Week is Shanghai Textile Group, who is in the center of the textile and clothing network in China. In cooperation with many consulates of other countries in Shanghai, Shanghai Fashion Week also invites many international designers to come present their latest work. It's also a venue for those designers who are targeting China.

As part of Fashion Week, Mode Shanghai puts on the Fashion Trade show, offering an expansive window into China's vast geography of regions and markets, while providing a channel for export sales of international brands and China's emerging designers. In 2013, Mode Shanghai collaborated with ENK International, the leading fashion apparel trade show producers headquartered in New York City.

=== 2013 ===
Mode Shanghai 2013 was held from 12-14 March 2013. It will cover approximately 25,000 square metres at the state-of-the-art Shanghai New International Expo Center in Pudong, Shanghai.

=== 2016 ===
Designers who showcased collections at Shanghai Fashion Week 2016 included Zhang Na (Fake Natoo), Moti Bai (Black Spoon), C.J. Yao (C.J. Yao), Momo Wang (Museum of Friendship), Nicole Zhang (Nicole Zhang), Zhang Da (Boundless), Zhang Yuhao (Zhang Yuhao), Mushroom Song (WMWM), Lu Kun (Mikumkum), and Kain Picken and Fiona Lau (Ffixxed Studios).
