= Nashville Fashion Week =

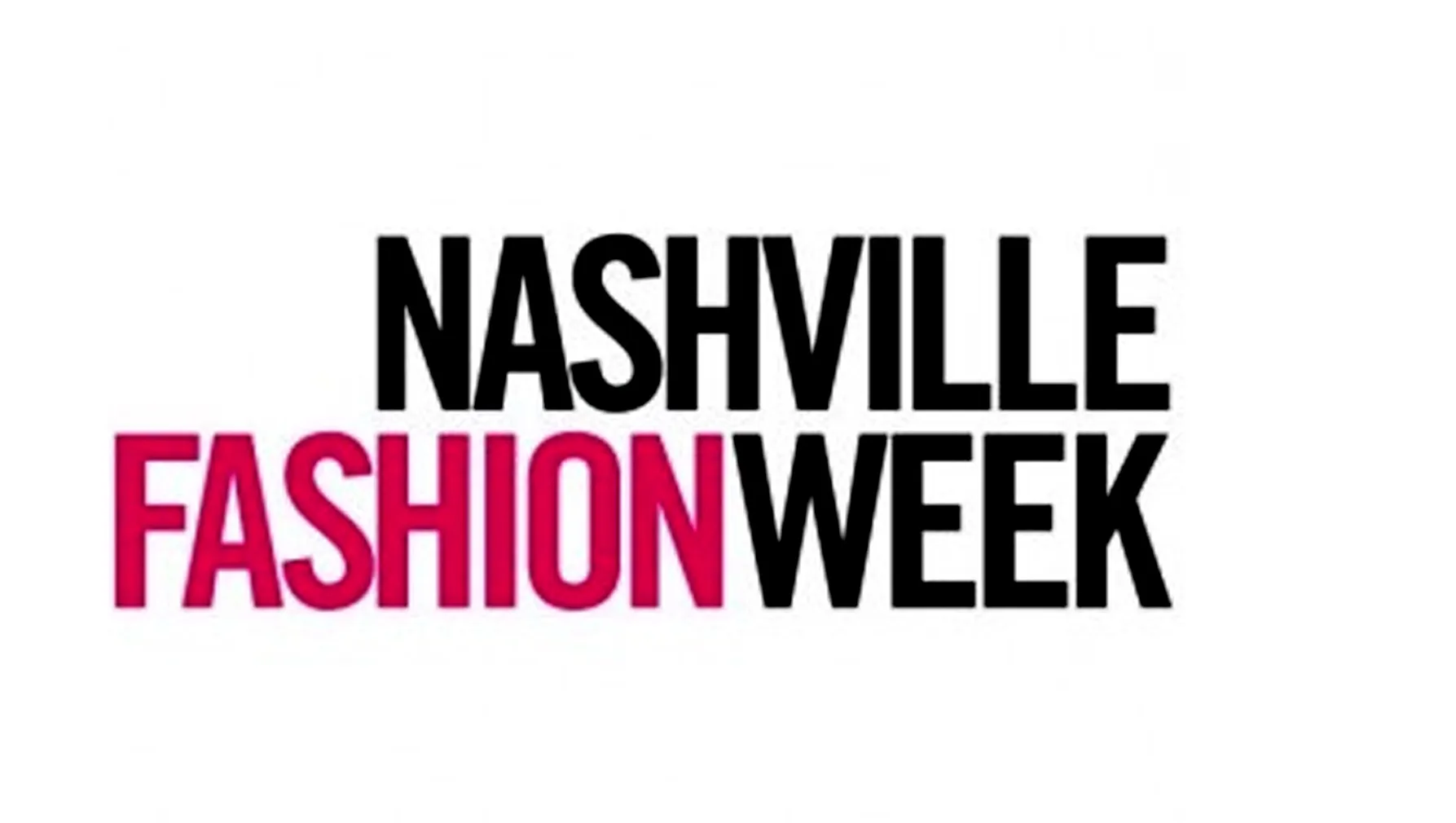
- Status: Active
- Frequency: Semi Annual
- Location: Nashville, Tennessee
- Inaugurated: 2011
- Founder: Connie Cathcart-Richardson, Marcia Masulla, and Mike Smith
- Most recent: 2023
- Website: Official website

Nashville Fashion Week (NFW), a citywide event typically held in March or April, is a celebration of Nashville, Tennessee's fashion and retail community featuring local, regional and national design talent in fashion events and shows.

== History ==
Showcasing his Fall/Winter Collection in March 2011, Christian Siriano was the first major designer to headline Nashville Fashion Week (formerly Lexus Nashville Fashion Week) alongside fashion designer Betsey Johnson. The following year, a runway presentation featuring Versace was held at the historic Parthenon, a full-scale replica of the original Parthenon in Athens, Greece. Fashion designer Randi Rahm closed NFW 2012 showing her collection at The Pinnacle at Symphony Place.

After the show became online-only in 2020 following the COVID-19 pandemic, it returned to physical shows in September 2021.

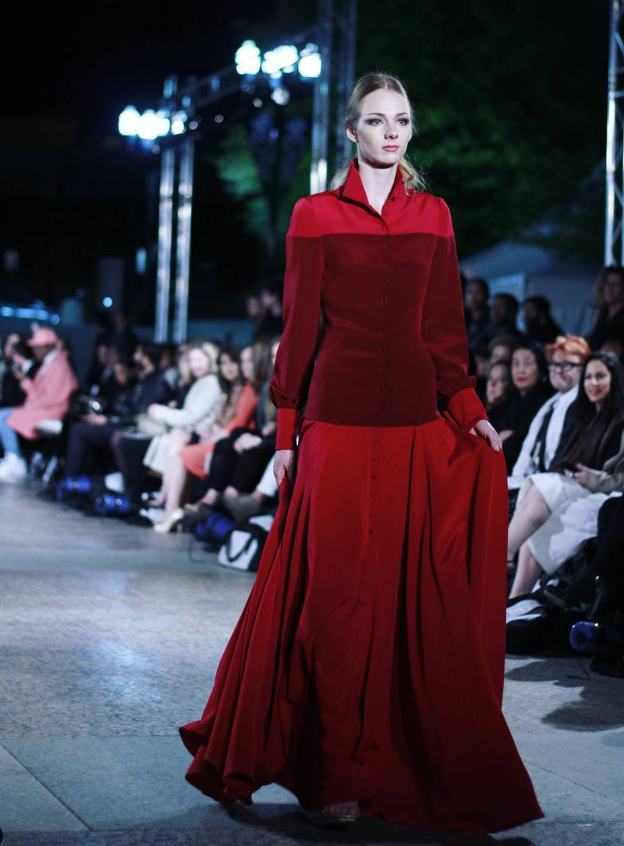
Nashville Fashion Week in 2016 (Julianna Bass Collection)

== Runway Shows ==
Fashion Designer(s)	Year
Akiko, Amanda Valentine, Aman Stovall, Ben Sherman, Betsey Johnson, Christian Siriano, Cooper by Courtney Warren, Coquette, Gado Gado, Gustavo Cadile, Jamie and the Jones, Julianna Bass, Katherine Kidd, Kevork Kiledjian, Leona, Loretta Jane, Melissa Tabor, Norma Clare, Olia Zavozina, Robert Graham, Shea Steele, Steven Oo, Sylvia Heisel, T. Rains, Union of Angels	2011
Amanda Valentine, Amy B., Black by Maria Silver, Brittany Blair, By Smith, Eva Franco, G-Star Raw, James and the Jones, Julianna Bass, Kal Rieman, Katherine Kidd, Leona, Magid Bernard, Truly Alvarenga, Randi Rahm, Red Doll, Shea Steele, Sjobeck, Sylvia Heisel, T. Rains, Trunk, Tuft, Wai Ming, Versace, Zang Toi	2012
Amanda Valentine, Black by Maria Silver, Bone Feather, Circle of Gentleman, Eric Adler Clothing, Fanny & June, Nadeau, Margaret Ellis Jewelry, Megan Huntz, Ola Mai, Ona Rex, Peter Nappi, Truly Alvarenga, Religion, Rinjuel, Seraphine Design, Shutters & Shuttles, Timo Weiland, Van Hoang	2015
Brooke Atwood, Megan Huntz, Lagi Nadeau, Truly Alvarenga, Ashley Balding, Denise Roxen, and Amanda Valentine, along with NFW newcomers including Daniella Kallmeyer, Michael Drummond, Afriyie Poku, and Francesca Marotta	2016
Amanda Valentine, Andrew Gallivan, Any Old Iron, Cavanagh Baker, Fauxgerty, Nadeau, Lily Guilder Design, Article X, Michael Drummond, Minxx, Nasheli Juliana, Ona Rex, Patrick Assaraf, Shea Steele, Splashed by DKG, Truly Alvaranga	2017
Anna Sui, Amanda Casarez, Andrew Gallivan, Any Old Iron, Ariel Inc, Barbara Bultman, Black by Maria Silver, Demestik by Reuben Reuel, Eileen Kelly, Faherty, Fauxgerty, Hickey Freeman Tailors Gold, H American Tailor, Julianna Bass, Justin Mark Richards, Nadeau, Laura Citron, Lily Guilder Design, Ola Mai, Ona Rex, Shea Steele, Splashed by DKG, Truly Alvarenga, Yellowcake Shop	2018

== Nashville Fashion Forward Fund (NFFF) ==
The Nashville Fashion Forward Fund is an endowed fund that supports the next generation of fashion industry professionals with ties to Middle Tennessee by providing an annual financial award and resources for experiential professional development opportunities.

Recipients of the Nashville Fashion Forward Fund (NFFF)
Fashion Designer(s)	Year
Julianna Bass	2011
Lauren Leonard Phelps	2012
Elise Joseph	2013
Ceri Hoover	2014
Eric Adler	2015
Brett Warren	2016
Maria Silver	2017
Van Hoang	2018
Megan Prange	2019
Haley Maddox	2022

== See also ==
- Fashion week
- List of fashion events
