= VTV =

VTV may refer to:

- Vaikundar Thirukkudumbam version, one among the versions of the holy book of Ayyavazhi
- Vinnaithaandi Varuvaayaa, a Tamil movie released in 2010
- VTV Ganesh (born 1961), Indian actor, comedian, and film producer
- V. T. Vijayan, film editor
- Valtiontalouden tarkastusvirasto, the Finnish State Audit Office

== Television channels, stations and networks ==
=== Current ===
- VTV (Belarusian TV channel)
- VTV (Pakistan), Virtual University of Pakistan's TV channel
- VTV (Salvadoran TV channel), a television station operated by Telecorporación Salvadoreña
- VTV (Australian TV station), a station in Victoria, Australia
- Vietnam Television, the national government-owned television network in Vietnam
- Vale TV, a Venezuelan educational TV station
- Venezolana de Televisión, a state-owned Venezuelan television station
- VTV (Maldives), a Maldivian private TV channel
- VTV televizija, a local TV station in Varaždin, Croatia
- VTV (Honduras), a television channel in Honduras, owned by Albavisión
- VTV (Paraguay), a pay television channel in Paraguay, owned by Personal TV
- VTV (Uruguay), a pay television channel in Uruguay, owned by Paco Casal
- VTV Gujarati, a 24-hour regional news channel in Gujarat, India
- VTV (Indonesian TV channel), a television network in Indonesia

=== Former ===
- VTV Vaša Televízia, defunct Slovak TV station
- VTV (Dutch TV channel), a defunct television channel in the Netherlands
- Variety Television Network, a defunct digital subchannel network owned by Newport Television
- VTV (Vancouver Television), the former on-air brand of CIVT-DT (CTV British Columbia)
