= International versions of Wheel of Fortune =

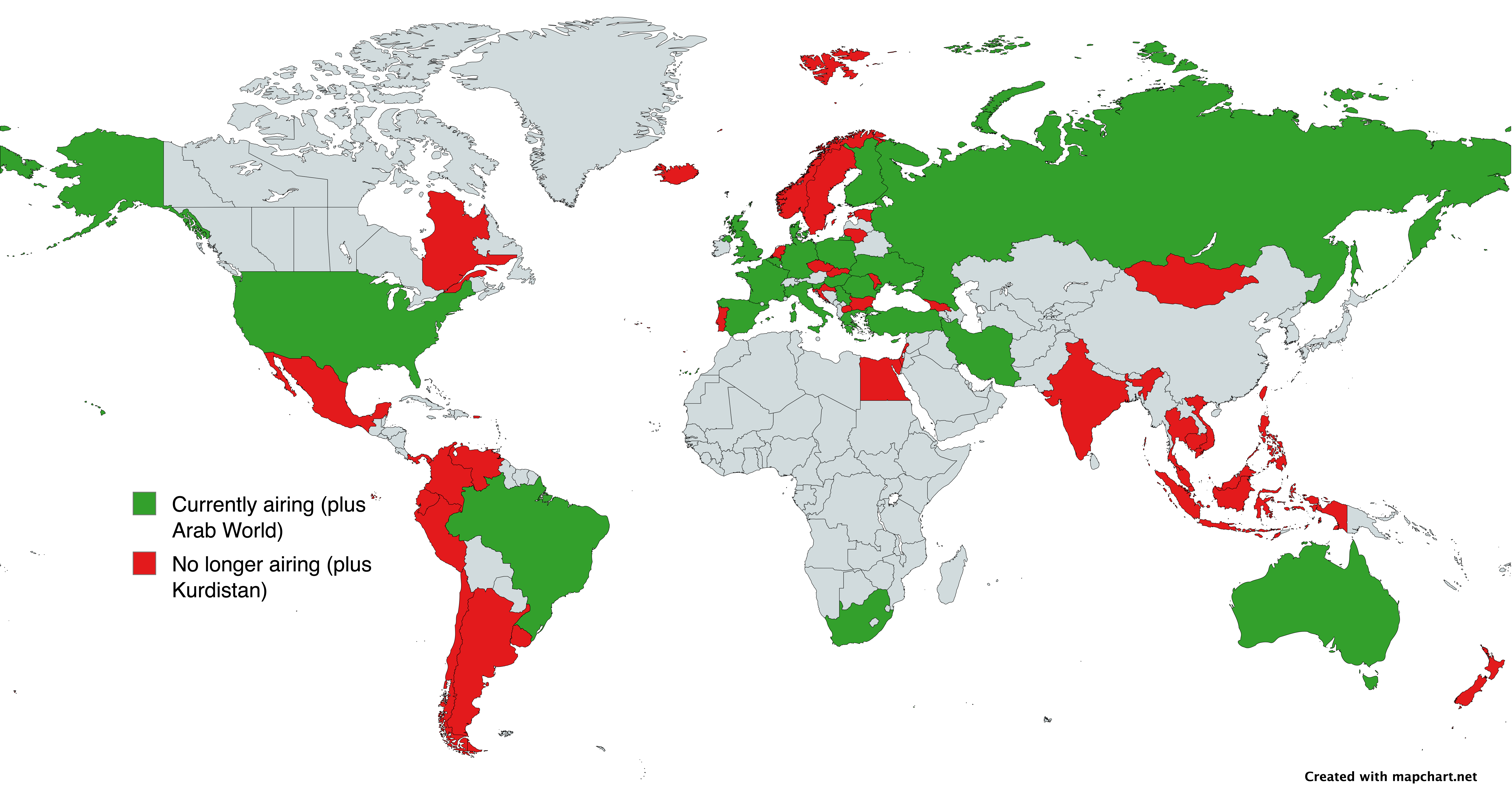
Map of countries that are airing/have aired Wheel of Fortune Current versions Former versions

Wheel of Fortune is an American television game show that was created by Merv Griffin and first aired in 1975, with a syndicated version airing since 1983. Since its premiere, the program has been adapted into several international adaptations. The 1975 version premiered on Australian TV in 1981 and premiered in the UK in 1988. It has also been adapted to numerous countries around the world.

== International versions ==
Legend:

Currently airing
Awaiting confirmation
Status unknown
Upcoming season
No longer airing

Complete list of licensed international adaptations
Region or Country	Local name	Host(s)	Hostess(es) or Co-host(s)	Network	Broadcast dates
Arab World	فالك طيب; Falak Tayeb	Yasser Al-Saqqaf	Taima Al-Khateeb; Sabine Khaled	MBC 1	January 23, 2022 – present
Argentina	Todo al 9	Berugo Carámbula	María Carámbula	Canal 9	1988–91
Argentina	Tiempo Límite	Gerardo Sofovich (2005–06); Alejandro Fantino (2007)	Valeria Urki; Agustina Vicoli; Ivanna Álvarez	América TV	2005–07
Argentina	La Ruleta de tus Sueños	Pamela Davíd	Lucas Loccisano	América TV	September 13, 2021 – March 7, 2022
Australia	Wheel of Fortune	Ernie Sigley (1981–84); John Burgess (1984–96); Tony Barber (1996); Rob Elliott (1997–2003); Steve Oemcke (2004–05); Larry Emdur (2006)	Adriana Xenides (1981–96, 1997–99); Kerrie Friend (1996–97); Sophie Falkiner (1999–2005); Laura Csortan (2006)	Seven Network	July 21, 1981 – July 28, 2006
Australia	Million Dollar Wheel of Fortune	Tim Campbell	Kelly Landry	Nine Network	May 26 – June 27, 2008
Australia	Wheel of Fortune Australia	Graham Norton	No hostess	Network 10	November 25, 2024 – present
Belgium (Flanders)	Het Rad der Fortuin	Mike Verdrengh	Unknown	BRT	1976
Belgium (Flanders)	Rad van Fortuin	Walter Capiau (1989–94); Bart Kaëll (1994–97)	Aurore Dobbelaere (1989); Bé De Meyere; Els Van Dyck (1995); Deborah Ostrega; Valerie Raymakers	VTM	1989–97
Belgium (Flanders)	Rad van Fortuin	Walter Grootaers; Koen Wauters; Luc Appermont (2004–06); Bart van den Bossche	Zoë van Gastel	VTM	2004–06
Belgium (Flanders)	Het Rad	Peter Van de Veire	No permanent assistant (Note: A celebrity guest performs the role in each episode)	VIER	2020–present
Brazil	Roletrando	Silvio Santos	Marisa Teixeira (1982–91); Cláudia Barone (1991–2003)	SBT	August 23, 1981 – September 26, 2003
Brazil	Roda a Roda	Silvio Santos (2003–11, 2013–19, 2021); Patrícia Abravanel (2012–17, 2021–24); Rebeca Abravanel (2017–20, 2022–present); Luís Ricardo (2008–17, 2019, 2021); Silvia Abravanel (2016–17)	Patrícia Salvador (2003–11); Daiane Amêndola (2012–14); Liminha (2005, 2012); Patrícia Abravanel (2013)	SBT	October 13, 2003 – present
Bulgaria	Колелото на късмета Koleloto na kasmeta	Rumen Lukanov	Jasmina Toshkova	Nova TV	January 18, 2010
Canada (Quebec)	La Roue chanceuse	Donald Lautrec	Lyne Sarrazin	TQS	May 1, 1989 – May 29, 1992
Cambodia	Unknown			CTN	2009
Chile	La Rueda de la Fortuna	Rodolfo Torrealba	Elisa de Larraechea	Canal 13	March 21 – September 12, 1979
Chile	La Rueda de la Suerte	Diana Bolocco	Yair Juri	Canal 13	October 19, 2018 – February 16, 2019
Colombia	La Rueda de La Fortuna	Mauro Urquijo	Laura Tobon	Caracól TV	1998–99
Colombia	La Rueda de La Fortuna	Gonzalo Vivanco	Laura Tobon	RCN	2012–13
Croatia	Kolo sreće	Oliver Mlakar	Tanja Tušek (1993–96); Elena Šuran (1996–98); Maja Vračarić (1998–2002)	HRT1	October 25, 1993 – June 21, 2002
Croatia	Kolo sreće	Boris Mirković	Iva Jerković	RTL Televizija	May 18, 2015 – 2017
Czech Republic	Kolotoč	Pavel Poulíček; Dalibor Gondík; Honza Musil	Adéla Gondíková; Radka Rüster	TV Nova	1996; 1997–2002
Denmark	Lykkehjulet	Michael Meyer Heim (1988); Bengt Burg (1989–96, 1997–2000); Keld Heick (1996–97); Lars Herlow (2000–01)	Pia Dresner (1988); Carina "Kategorina" Johannesson (1989–94); Elona Sjøgren; Maria Hirse (1995–2001)	TV2	October 1, 1988 – December 31, 2001
Denmark	Lykkehjulet	Mikkel Kryger	Stephania Potalivo	TV2	October 2018
Denmark	Lykkehjulet	Mikkel Kryger	Kanya Natasja Rørbech	TV 2 Charlie	January 2020 – present
Ecuador	La Rueda de la Fortuna	Francisco Cabanilla	Unknown	Ecuavisa	2004
Egypt	دايرة الحياة; Dayret Al Hayat	Kareem Kojak	Heba Sameer Goudah	Hayat 2	August 19, 2012 – 2013
Estonia	Õnneratas	Emil Rutiku	Kätlin Piirimäe	TV3	1999–2000
Estonia	Suur lotokolmapäev	Mart Sander (2011–12); Kristjan Jõekalda (2012–13)	Kätlin Piirimäe	Kanal 2	2011–13
Finland	Onnenpyörä; Onnenpyörä VIP	Kim Floor (1993); Janne Porkka (1993–2001)	Tiina Vierto (1993–95); Susan Sirén (1995–98); Kati Jalojärvi (1998–99); Saija Palin (1999–2001)	MTV3	January 2, 1993 – August 31, 2001
Finland	Onnenpyörä; Onnenpyörä VIP	Jethro Rosted	Sara Sieppi	TV5	February 28, 2018 – October 23, 2019
Finland	Onnenpyörä; Onnenpyörä VIP	Cristal Snow	Niko Saarinen	FOX	2021
France	La Roue de la fortune	Michel Robbe (1987); Christian Morin (1987–92); Alexandre Debanne (1993–94); Olivier Chiabodo (1995–97)	Annie Pujol (1987–94); Sandra Rossi (1995); Frédérique Calvez (1995–97)	TF1	January 5, 1987 – March 28, 1997
France	La Roue de la fortune	Christophe Dechavanne; Benjamin Castaldi (January–March 2012)	Victoria Silvstedt; Valérie Bègue (January–March 2012)	TF1	August 7, 2006 – March 23, 2012
France	La Roue de la fortune	Éric Antoine	No hostess	M6	January 27, 2025 – present
Georgia	იღბლიანი ბორბალი Igbliani Borbali	Duta Skhirtladze; Vaniko Tarkhnishvili	Shorena Begashvili	Rustavi 2	March 3, 2011 – September 2016
Germany	Glücksrad	Frederic Meisner; Peter Bond	Maren Gilzer	Sat.1	November 7, 1988 – May 15, 1998
Germany	Glücksrad	Frederic Meisner (1998–2001); Thomas Ohrner (2001–02)	Sonya Kraus (1998–2002); Katrin Wrobel (2002)	kabel eins	May 18, 1998 – October 31, 2002
Germany	Glücksrad	Frederic Meisner	Ramona Drews	9Live	March 1, 2004 – March 5, 2005
Germany	Glücksrad	Jan Hahn	Isabel Edvardsson	RTLplus	October 17, 2016 – February 2018
Germany	Glücksrad	Sonya Kraus, Thomas Hermanns (2023) and Guido Cantz (2024)		RTL Zwei	January 26, 2023 – present
Germany	Kinder-Glücksrad	Petra Hausberg	—N/a	Sat.1	May 10, 1992 – 1993
Germany	Glücksrad-Gala	Peter Bond and Frederic Meisner	Maren Gilzer and Gundis Zámbó	Sat.1	1993–96
Greece; Cyprus	Ο τροχός της τύχης O trochós tis tíchis	Giorgos Polychroniou (1990–92); Danis Katranidis (1992–94); Pavlos Haikalis (1994–97)	Stella Manola (1990); Krista (1991–97)	ANT1	January 1, 1990 – 1997
Greece; Cyprus	Ο τροχός της τύχης O trochós tis tíchis	Yannis Koutrakis	Niki Kartsona	MEGA	1997–98
Greece; Cyprus	Ο τροχός της τύχης O trochós tis tíchis	Petros Polychronidis	Julia Nova (2015–18); Iosifina Tzouganaki (2018–19); Valia Hatzitheodwrou (2019–21); Natasa Kouvela (2021–)	Star Channel	March 23, 2015 – present
Hungary	Szerencsekerék	Tamás Gajdos; Viktor Klausmann	Dóra Prokopp	MTV1	January 2, 1993 – 1997
Hungary	Szerencsekerék	Viktor Klausmann; Tamás Gajdos (1997–99); András Vízy (1999–2001)	Györgyi Pataki	TV2	1997 – August 2001
Hungary	Szerencsekerék	Viktor Klausmann; Attila Árpa; Andrea Szulák (2012)	Zsuzsa Rácz	Story4	September 19, 2011 – December 31, 2012
Hungary	Szerencsekerék	Tibor Kasza	Sydney van den Bosch (2021–24); Eleni Balogh	TV2	July 19, 2021 – present
Iceland	Svaraðu Strax	Björn Karlsson	Bryndís Schram	Stöð 2	1988–89
India	Surf Wheel of Fortune	Mohan Kapoor	Vaibhavi Raut	Zee TV	1996–98
India	Wheel of Fortune India	Akshay Kumar	Elnaaz Norouzi	Sony TV	January 27 – April 27, 2026
Indonesia	Roda Impian	Charles Bonar Sirait	Vicki (2001–02); Ike (2002)	SCTV	August 6, 2001 – August 2, 2002
Iran	چرخ شانس; Charkhe Shans	Arash Estilaf	Nasim Arab	MBC Persia	April 3, 2022 – present
Israel	גלגל המזל; Galgal HaMazal	Erez Tal; Gil Sassover	Efrat Rotem; Meirav Levin; Galit Burg; Ruth Gonzales; Ingrid Feldman; Tal Man; Sigal Shachmon; Anat Elimelech	Channel 2	November 1993 – 2000
Italy	La ruota della fortuna	Augusto "Casti" Mondelli	Raffaella de Riso (1987–88); Michelle Klippstein (1988)	Odeon TV	October 19, 1987 – June 25, 1988
Italy	La ruota della fortuna	Mike Bongiorno	Ylenia Carrisi (1989); Paola Barale (1989–95); Roberta Capua (1995); Antonella Elia (1995–96)	Canale 5	March 5, 1989 – June 29, 1996
Italy	La ruota della fortuna	Mike Bongiorno	Claudia Grego (1996–97); Ana Laura Ribas (1997); Miriana Trevisan (1997–2002); Nancy Comelli (2002–03)	Rete 4	September 9, 1996 – December 20, 2003
Italy	La ruota della fortuna	Enrico Papi	Victoria Silvstedt	Italia 1	December 10, 2007 – June 19, 2009
Italy	La ruota della fortuna	Gerry Scotti	Samira Lui	Canale 5	May 6, 2024 – present
Kurdistan	Unknown				2000s
Kurdistan	چەرخی بەخت; Charxi Baxt	Erfan Salamy	Azeez Omed	Kurdmax Show	2017–20
Lebanon	دولاب الحظ; Dulab Al Hazi	Unknown		Telé Liban	1988
Lithuania	Laimės Ratas	Saulius Siparis	Unknown	TV3	1998–1999
Malaysia	Roda Impian	Halim Othman (1996–2002); Hani Mohsin (2002–06)	Zalda Zainal; Abby Abadi; Spell; Liza AF1; Irma Hasmie; Fauziah Gous	Astro Ria	1996–2006
Malaysia	Roda Impian	Kieran	Fauziah Gous	TV3	2009
Mexico	La rueda de la fortuna	Laura Flores	Anastasia	Canal de las Estrellas	1995–97
Mexico	La Rueda de la Suerte	Rafael Mercadante	Curvy Zelma Cherem	Azteca Uno	July 31, 2023 – February 16, 2024
Moldova	Roata norocului	Dan Negru	Anastasia Fotachi	Prime	November 22, 2019 – February 10, 2023
Netherlands	Rad van Fortuin	Hans van der Togt	Leontine Borsato (1989–1994); Patricia Rietveld (1994–95); Cindy Pielstroom (1996–98)	RTL 4	1989–98
Netherlands	Rad van Fortuin	Carlo Boszhard	Leontine Borsato	RTL 4	2009
Netherlands	Rad van Fortuin	Andre Hazes Jr.	Stephanie Tency	SBS 6	August 22, 2016 – July 27, 2017
New Zealand	Wheel of Fortune	Phillip Leishman (1991–96); Simon Barnett (1996)	Lana Coc-Kroft	TV2	February 11, 1991 – May 24, 1996
New Zealand	Wheel of Fortune	Jason Gunn	Sonia Gray; Greer Robson (2009)	TV One	April 14, 2008 – May 2, 2009
North Macedonia	Тркало На Среќата; Trkalo Na Srekata	Igor Dzambazov	Natali Grubovic	A1 Channel	2009–11
Norway	Lykkehjulet	Ragnar Otnes; Knut Bjørnsen	Ulrika Nilsson; Lise Nilsen	TV3	March 13, 1990 – April 16, 1993
Panama	La Rueda de la Fortuna	Rassiel Rodríguez	Nadage Herrera	TVN	2001
Panama	La Rueda de la Fortuna	Jorge Ortega	Nadage Herrera	Telemetro	2011
Peru	La Ruleta de la Suerte	Christian Rivero	Gisela Valcárcel	Frecuencia Latina	2011–12
Philippines	Wheel of Fortune	Rustom Padilla	Victoria London	ABC 5	November 19, 2001 – May 31, 2002
Philippines	Wheel of Fortune	Kris Aquino	Zara Aldana and Jasmine Fitzgerald	ABS–CBN	January 14 – July 25, 2008
Poland	Koło fortuny	Wojciech Pijanowski (1992–95); Jerzy Bończak (1995); Andrzej Kopiczyński (1995); Paweł Wawrzecki (1995); Stanisław Mikulski (1995–98)	Magda Masny (Note: In 1997, Anna Samusionek stood in for Magda Masny for two months due to Masny’s pregnancy.)	TVP2	October 2, 1992 – September 1, 1998
Poland	Koło fortuny	Krzysztof Tyniec	Marta Lewandowska (Note: Maiden name: Lewandowska; married name: Piekarska. Often referred to as ‘Magda’.)	TVP2	October 29, 2007 – October 27, 2009
Poland	Koło fortuny	Rafał Brzozowski (2017–19)	Izabella Krzan (2017–24 (Note: Last episode with Norbi and Krzan was taped in 2023 and broadcast in 2024.) (Note: Krzan first served only as a hostess, but was gradually promoted to become a co-host.))	TVP2	September 11, 2017 – present
Poland	Koło fortuny	Norbert "Norbi" Dudziuk (2019–24); Izabella Krzan (2017–24)		TVP2	September 11, 2017 – present
Poland	Koło fortuny	Agnieszka Dziekan (2024–present); Błażej Stencel (2024–present)		TVP2	September 11, 2017 – present
Portugal	A Roda da Sorte	Herman José	Ruth Rita	RTP1	September 17, 1990 – December 31, 1993
Portugal	A Roda da Sorte	Herman José	Vanessa Palma	SIC	September 8 – December 10, 2008
Portugal	Roda da Sorte	Cristina Ferreira	No hostess	TVI	September 21, 2026 – present
Puerto Rico	Quién Sabe Más	Daniela Droz; Carlos Esteban Fonseca	Jose Juan	WIPR-TV	2012–15
Romania	Roata norocului	Daniel Pitei	Diana Stancu	TVR1	March 1997
Romania	Roata norocului	Mihai Călin	Iulia Frățilă	Pro TV	December 1997 – May 1999
Romania	Roata norocului	Liviu Vârciu (2012–13); Adrian "Bursucu" Cristea (2015–present)	Ana Maria Barnoschi	Kanal D	June 20, 2012 – present
Serbia	Kolo sreće	Milorad Mandić	Soraja Vučelić	Happy TV	December 21, 2015 – June 21, 2016
Serbia	Kolo sreće	Vladimir Đorđević; Predrag Damnjanović; Dušan Kaličanin	Verica Mihajlović	B92	April 21, 2025 – present
Singapore	Wheel of Fortune Singapore	Bernard Lim	Eunice Olsen	MediaCorp Channel 5	May 8, 2002 – April 2, 2003
Slovakia	Koleso šťastia	Jozef Pročko; Tibor Hlista; Roman Feder; Laco Híveš; Roman Pomajbo; Peter Marcin	Unknown	STV; VTV	1994–97
Slovakia	Koleso šťastia	Lukáš Adamec	Alžbeta Ferencová	Markíza	July 25, 2016 – January 23, 2017
Slovakia	Koleso šťastia	Lukáš Adamec	Alžbeta Ferencová	TV Doma	January 7 – March 20, 2020
Slovenia	Kolo sreče	Mito Trefalt	Damjana Golavšek	TV SLO1	September 30, 1989 – September 29, 1990
Slovenia	Kolo sreče	Gorazd Mavretič	Mirjam Poterbin	TV SLO1	1994
Slovenia	Kolo sreče	Klemen Bučan	Nataša Naneva	Planet TV	February 13, 2023 – present
South Africa	Wheel of Fortune South Africa	Rorisang Thandekiso	No hostess	SABC 3	April 8, 2024 – present
Spain	La ruleta de la fortuna	Mayra Gómez Kemp (1990); Ramón García (Summer 1990); Irma Soriano (1990–91); Bigote Arrocet (1991–92); Mabel Lozano (1991–92); Belén Rueda (1992)	Diana Fernández (1991–97)	Antena 3	January 25, 1990 – 1992
Spain	La ruleta de la fortuna	Fernando Esteso (1993); Jesús Vázquez (1993–94); Andoni Ferreño (1994–95); Goyo González (1995–96); Carlos Lozano (1996–97)	Diana Fernández (1991–97)	Telecinco	January 1993 – 1997
Spain	La ruleta de la fortuna junior	Silvia Ruiz	Pedro León	Telecinco	1998–99
Spain	La ruleta de la suerte	Jorge Fernández	Paloma López (2006–15); Laura Moure (2015–present); Bárbara González (2016–20); Brian Pérez (2026–present)	Antena 3	April 18, 2006 – present
Sweden	Lyckohjulet	Ragnar Otnes	Ulrika Nilsson	TV3	March 13, 1990 – April 16, 1993
Sweden	Miljonlotteriet Lyckohjulet	Hans Wiklund	Hannah Graaf	TV8	2010
Thailand	ลาภติดเลข	Triphop Limpapath	Unknown	Channel 5	1983–84
Turkey	Çarkıfelek	Ümit Güner (1975–86); Tarık Tarcan (1986–95); Halit Kıvanç (1995–96); Yıldo (1996); Mehmet Ali Erbil (1997–2004, 2006, 2008–11, 2015–17); Muazzez Ersoy (2003); Deniz Seki and Emel Müftüoğlu (2004); Arto (2004); Hamdi Alkan (2005); Petek Dinçöz (2011–12); İlker Ayrık (2014); Emre Karayel (2018–20); Onur Büyüktopçu (2020); Cem Davran (2024)	Yasemin Koşal (1992–?); Tuğba Özay (2015)	TRT 1 (1975–92); TRT 2 (1986–92); Show TV (1992–96, 2005–06, 2016–17); Cine5 (1995–96); Kanal D (1997–2003, 2014, 2018–20); TGRT (2003–04) atv (2004); Kanal 1 (2008); FOX (2008–09); Flash TV (2009); Star TV (2010, 2015, 2017); TNT (2011–12); TV8 (2024)	1975–2006; 2008–12; 2014–20; 2024
Turkey	Çark 2000	Ataman Erkul	Unknown	Kanal D	2000
Ukraine	Колесо фортуни Кoleso fortuny	Yuriy Horbunov	No hostess	1+1 Ukraine	March 8 – June 7, 2025
United Kingdom	Wheel of Fortune	Nicky Campbell (1988–96); Bradley Walsh (1997); John Leslie (1998–2001); Paul Hendy (2001)	Angela Ekaette (1988); Carol Smillie (1989–94); Jenny Powell (1995–2001); Terri Seymour (2001)	ITV	July 19, 1988 – December 21, 2001
United Kingdom	Wheel of Fortune	Graham Norton	No hostess	ITV	January 6, 2024 – present
United States	Wheel of Fortune (original version)	Chuck Woolery (1975–81); Pat Sajak (1981–89); Rolf Benirschke (1989)	Susan Stafford (1975–82); Vanna White (1982–89)	NBC	January 6, 1975 – June 30, 1989
United States	Wheel of Fortune (original version)	Bob Goen	Vanna White	CBS	July 17, 1989 – January 11, 1991
United States	Wheel of Fortune (original version)	Bob Goen	Vanna White	NBC	January 14 – September 20, 1991
United States	Wheel of Fortune (original version)	Pat Sajak (1983–2024); Ryan Seacrest (2024–present)	Vanna White	Syndication	September 19, 1983 – present
United States	Wheel 2000	David Sidoni	Tanika Ray (as "Cyber Lucy")	CBS	September 13, 1997 – February 7, 1998
United States	Celebrity Wheel of Fortune	Pat Sajak (2021–2025); Ryan Seacrest (2025–present)	Vanna White	ABC	January 7, 2021 – present
Uruguay	La rueda de la fortuna	Marisa Montana	Roberto Butula	Canal 4	1984
Uruguay	La Ruleta de la Suerte	Rafa Villanueva	Roxanne Machin	Teledoce	August 11, 2020 – March 1, 2022
Venezuela	La Estrella de la Fortuna	Orlando Urdaneta; Corina Azopardo; Luis Velazco; Juan Manuel Montesinos	Maru Winckelman	Venevisión	July 18, 1984 – December 23, 1987
Vietnam	Chiếc nón kỳ diệu (Note: Similar to Wheel 2000 in the U.S. (2007–09))	Lại Văn Sâm (2001); Trịnh Long Vũ (2001–06); Phan Tuấn Tú (2006–13); Lưu Minh Vũ (2013); Danh Tùng (2014–15); Bùi Đức Bảo (2015–16)	Phạm Thu Hằng (2001–03); Hương Giang (2003–07); Võ Thuận Sơn (as "MaiKa") (2007–09); Hồng Nhung (2009–16)	VTV3	May 12, 2001 – December 24, 2016

Notes

Complete list of unlicensed international adaptations
Region or Country	Local name	Host(s)	Hostess(es)	Network	Dates
Greece; Cyprus	Τηλερουλετα; Tilerouleta	Giorgos Polychroniou	Krista	ANT1	1991–92
Malaysia	Roller Kata	Fahrin Ahmad	Deeba Halil	Awesome TV	2021
Mongolia	Агшин; Agshin	Sh. Yolk	No hostess	MNB	April 1992 – 2010s
Russia	Поле чудес Pole Chudes	Vladislav Listyev (1990–91); Leonid Yakubovich (1991–present); Valdis Pelsh (December 27, 2002)	Rimma Agafoshina (1997–present)	1TV	October 26, 1990 – present
Taiwan	嚦咕嚦咕樂翻天	Lì gū lì gū lè fāntiān	Unknown	Star TV	2000s
Taiwan	全民字多星	Quánmín zì duō xīng (The Wise Man of the Chinese Characters)	Unknown		January 1 – July 1, 2011
Thailand	เกมปริศนา	Suttipong Thadpitakkul	Unknown	Channel 3	November 2, 2000 – September 27, 2001

== See also ==
- List of television game show franchises
