= Lindsay Timberlake =

American fashion model

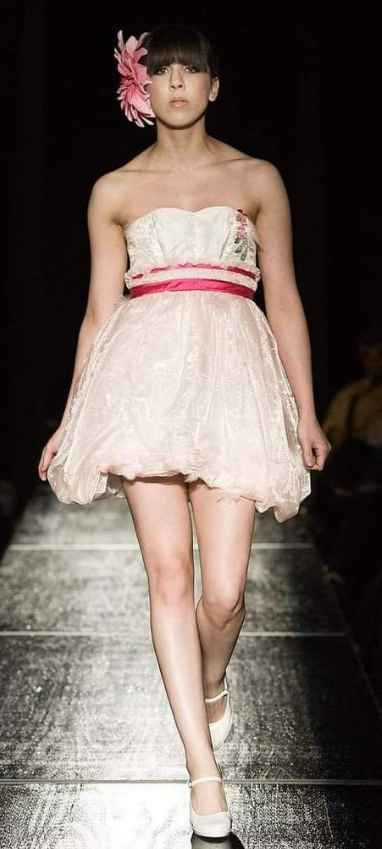
- Born: February 8, 1994 (age 31); Nashville, Tennessee, U.S.
- Occupation: Fashion model
- Height: 6 ft 0 in (1.83 m)

Lindsay Erin Timberlake (born February 8, 1994) is a fashion model of Irish, Northwestern European and Swedish descent.

== Life and career ==
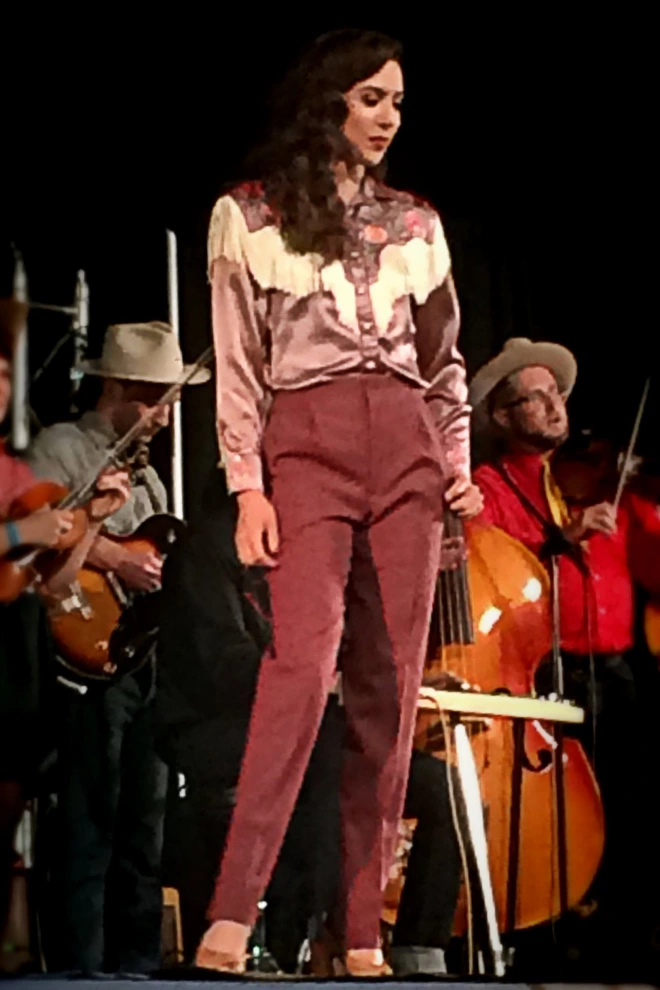
Timberlake walking the runway at the Nashville Boogie Vintage Weekender for Manuel (2016)

Lindsay Timberlake was born in Nashville, Tennessee. Prior to modeling, she sold vintage clothing in East Nashville while working as a wardrobe stylist in the fashion industry. In 2009, Timberlake was nominated 1st runner up in the Miss Chattanooga Pageant. The following year, she worked for fashion designer, Vivienne Tam in New York City. Timberlake began creating online content as a fashion blogger for Today I'm Wearing in 2011, acquired by Associated Newspaper Ltd in 2012.

In 2015, Timberlake walked the runway for western wear designer Manuel Cuevas wearing clothing designed for Linda Ronstadt and again in 2016 alongside Kacey Musgraves at Gaylord Opryland Resort & Convention Center. In 2018, Nashville Fashion Week shows Timberlake wearing Ola Mai by Leslie Stephens for the March issue of Nashville Scene.

She is featured in the February 2021 issue of Vogue for Jerry Lee Atwood photographed by Tierney Gearon.

== Publications ==
Year	Publication	Designer	Role	Publisher	Date
2018	Nashville Scene	Ola Mai	Model	SouthComm Communications	March 2018
2021	Vogue Magazine	Union Western	Model	Condé Nast	February 2021
2021	The United States of Fashion: A New Atlas of American Style	Union Western	Model	Rizzoli Books	September 2021
