= Miss International 1993 =

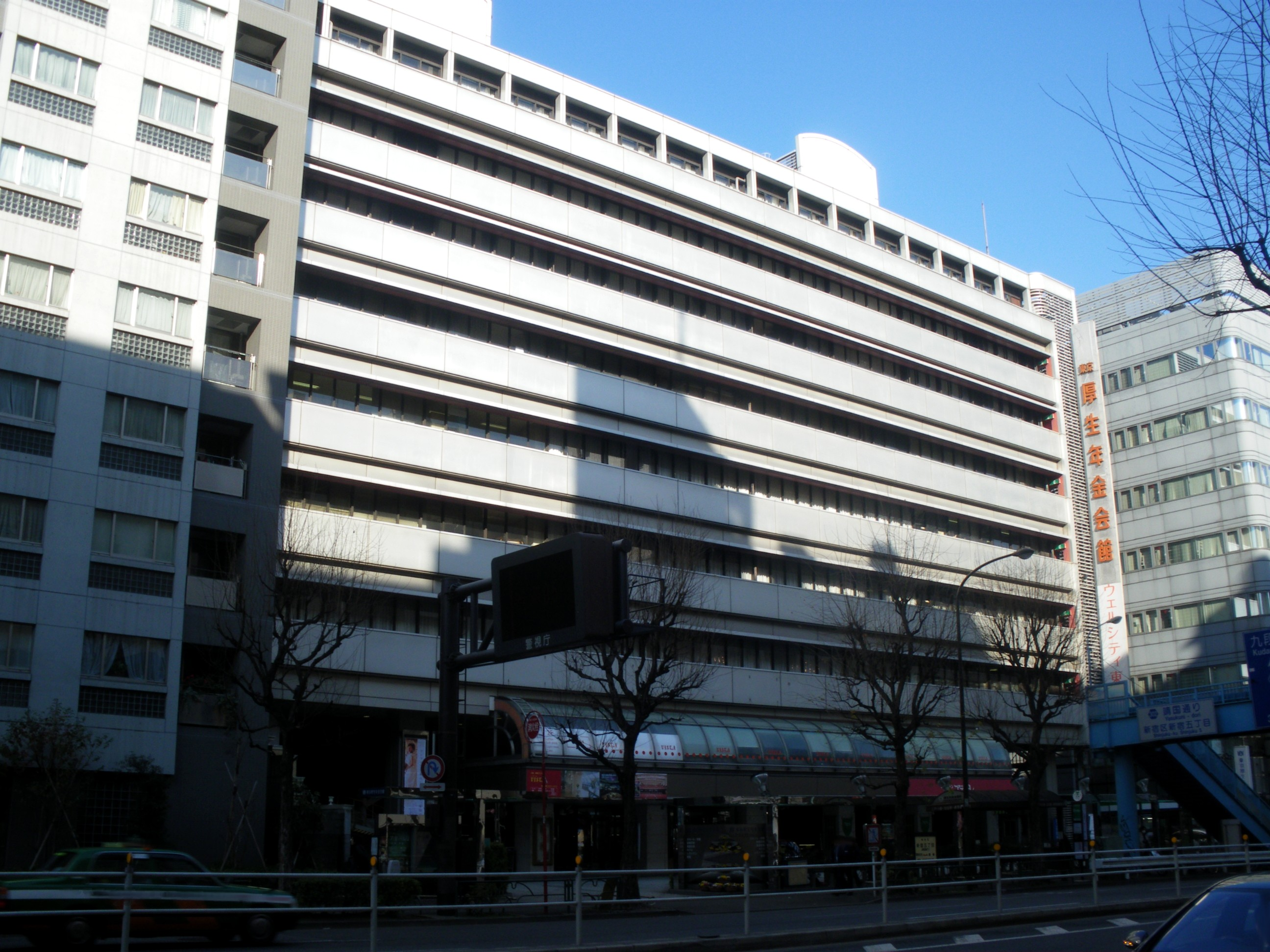
- Date: October 9, 1993
- Presenters: Masumi Okada
- Venue: Koseinenkin Kaikan Hall, Tokyo, Japan
- Broadcaster: TV Tokyo
- Entrants: 47
- Placements: 15
- Debuts: Russia; Slovak Republic; Ukraine
- Withdrawals: Canada; Czechoslovakia; Dominican Republic; El Salvador; Guam; Iceland; Italy; Norway; Senegal
- Returns: New Caledonia; Nicaragua; Portugal
- Winner: Agnieszka Pachałko; Poland

Miss International 1993, the 33rd Miss International pageant, was held on October 9, 1993, in Tokyo, Japan. Agnieszka Pachałko earned Poland's second Miss International crown.

== Results ==
=== Placements ===
Placement	Contestant
Miss International 1993	Poland - Agnieszka Pachalko
1st Runner-up	Russia - Ilmira Shamsutdinova
2nd Runner-up	Ukraine - Victorovna Romanenko
Top 15	Australia - Monique Ann Lysaught; Belgium - Christelle Roelandts; Colombia - Kathy Sáenz; Guatemala - Diana Galván; India - Pooja Batra; Israel - Anat Elimelech ✝︎; Japan - Masayo Shibasaki; Luxembourg - Nathalie Dos Santos; Mexico - María Cristina Arcos; South Korea - Chang Eun-young; Turkey - Hande Kazanova; Venezuela - Faviola Spitale

== Contestants ==
- Argentina - Nazarena Vanesa González Almada
- Australia - Monique Ann Lysaught
- Austria - Silvia Kronbichler
- Belgium - Christelle Roelandts
- Bolivia - Maria Cristina Tondelli
- Brazil - Tatiana Paula Alves
- Colombia - Kathy Sáenz Herrera
- Costa Rica - Laura Odio Salas
- Denmark - Mette Marie Salto
- Finland - Arlene Ulla Kaarina Kotala
- France - Marie-Ange Noelle Contart
- Germany - Katja Mordarski
- Great Britain - Claire Elizabeth Smith
- Greece - Helena Christos Zabaka
- Guatemala - Diana Lucrecia Galván Flores
- Hawaii - Theresa Victoria Tilley
- Holland - Shirley Antoinette Bogaard
- Honduras - Miriam Liseth Zapata Godoy
- Hong Kong - Middy Yu Siu-Po
- India - Pooja Batra
- Ireland - Deborah Hannigan
- Israel - Anat Elimelech ✝︎
- Japan - Masayo Shibasaki
- Luxembourg - Nathalie Dos Santos
- Malta - Melissa Joanne Portelli
- Mexico - María Cristina Arcos Torres
- New Caledonia - Laure Denise Masson
- New Zealand - Monique Lorraine Joel
- Nicaragua - Ida Patricia Delaney
- Northern Mariana Islands - Tayna Castro Belyeu
- Panama - Ismenia Isabel Velásquez
- Philippines - Sheela Mae Capili Santarin ✝︎
- Poland - Agnieszka Pachalko
- Portugal - Anabela Pacheco Centeno
- Puerto Rico - Brenda Esther Robles Cortés
- Russia - Ilmira Shamsutdinova
- Singapore - Teri Su Lian Tan
- Slovak Republic - Karin Majtánová
- South Korea - Chang Eun-young
- Spain - Ana Piedad Galván Malagón
- Sweden - Anna Hofvenstam
- Switzerland - Chantal Hediger
- Thailand - Supasiri Payaksiri
- Turkey - Hande Kazanova ile Astroloji
- Ukraine - Nataliya Victorovna Romanenko
- United States - Lynette Jonene MacFee
- Venezuela - Fabiola Mónica Rita Spitale Baiamonte
