= Miss Slovakia =

Beauty pageant

Miss Slovakia Miss Slovensko
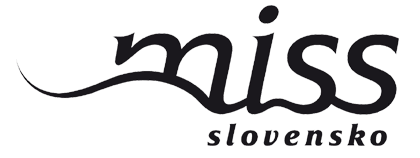
- Formation: 1993
- Type: Beauty pageant
- Headquarters: Bratislava
- Location: Slovakia
- Members: Miss World; Miss Universe; Miss International; Miss Supranational
- Official language: Slovak
- Website: Official website

Miss Slovakia (Slovak: Miss Slovensko) is a national beauty pageant in Slovakia, active since 1993.

== Titleholders ==
Year	Miss Slovenso	Region	I. Vice-miss	II. Vice-miss	Ref.
1993	Karin Majtánová	Trenčín	Silvia Lakatošová	–	
1994	Nikoleta Meszárošová	Rimavská Sobota	–	–	
1995	Iveta Jankulárová	Šaľa	Zuzana Špatinová	Denisa Vanyová	
1996	Marcela Jančová	Bratislava	–	–	

Oklamčák Production agency

Edition	Year	Miss Slovakia (1st place)	Age	Hometown	1st runner-up (2nd place)	2nd runner-up (3rd place)	3rd runner-up (4th place)	Ref.
1	1996	Vladimíra Hreňovčíková	17	Zvolen	Slávka Popíková	Adrianna Varigová	Katarína Štepánková	

Edition	Year	Miss Slovakia (1st place)	Age	Hometown	1st runner-up (2nd place)	2nd runner-up (3rd place)	Miss Sympathy (Public vote)	Ref.
2	1997	Lucia Povrazníková	18	Banská Bystrica	Barbora Vargová	Simona Santnerová	Katarína Haková	
3	1998	Karolína Čičátková	18	Nové Zámky	Jana Kusovská	Monika Tichá	Alena Drozdová	
4	1999	Andrea Verešová	18	Žilina	Adela Bartková	Dušana Fridrichová	Andrea Verešová	
5	2000	Janka Horečná	20	Žilina	Martina Hodruská	Michaela Strählová	Ingrid Bíliková	
6	2001	Jana Ivanová	18	Trenčín	Lucia Pilková	Barbara Pappová	Lucia Pilková	
7	2002	Eva Verešová	20	Veľké Zálužie	Hana Burianová	Zuzana Gunišová	Michaela Beňušková	
8	2003	Adriána Pospíšilová	19	Bratislava	Miroslava Luberdová	Simona Slobodníková	Silvia Mikušová	
9	2004	Mária Sándorová	19	Čaňa	Tatiana Krčméryová	Aneta Kailingová	Tatiana Krčméryová	
10	2005	Ivica Sláviková	21	Bratislava	Katarína Holáňová	Lucia Debnárová	Lenka Vargová	
11	2006	Magdaléna Šebestová	22	Bílkove Humence	Zuzana Lazová	Dagmar Ivanová	Magdaléna Šebestová	
12	2007	Veronika Husárová	20	Komárno	Romana Škamlová	Kristína Valušková	Romana Škamlová	
13	2008	Edita Krešáková	19	Seňa	Kristína Vlková	Lenka Sýkorová	Lucia Gažová	
14	2009	Barbora Franeková	20	Žilina	Soňa Skoncová	Aneta Valentová	Michaela Štítová	
15	2010	Marína Georgievová	18	Banská Bystrica	Martina Dávidová	Tatiana Kohútová	Marína Georgievová	
16	2011	Michaela Ňurciková	20	Nové Zámky	Dušana Lukáčová	Ľubica Kvasnicová	Romana Grišlová	
17	2012	Kristína Krajčírová	20	Bratislava	Denisa Krajčovičová	Silvia Kimličková	Dominika Tóthová	
18	2013	Karolína Chomisteková	19	Oravský Podzámok	Nikoleta Duchoňová	Luciána Čvirková	Barbora Lučivjanská	
19	2014	Laura Longauerová	18	Detva	Lucia Semanková	Michaela Nguyenová	Lucia Semanková	
20	2015	Lujza Straková	20	Banská Bystrica	Barbora Bakošová	Petra Denková	Lujza Straková	
21	2016	Kristína Činčurová	18	Lučenec	Michaela Meňkyová	Lenka Tekeljaková	Lenka Tekeljaková	
22	2017	Hanka Závodná	21	Bratislava	Petra Varaliová	Michaela Cmarková	Petra Varaliová	
23	2018	Dominika Grecová	20	Humenné	Radka Grendová	Jasmina Tatyová	Nicole Hromkovičová	
24	2019	Frederika Kurtulíková	24	Bratislava	Alica Ondrášová	Natália Hrušovská	Tereza Turzová	
25	2020	Leona Novoberdaliu	23	Bratislava	Viktória Podmanická	Kristína Víglaská	Viktória Podmanická	
26	2021	Sophia Hrivňáková	21	Banská Štiavnica	Sylvia Šulíková	Jana Vozárová	Júlia Ivanová	

Edition	Year	Miss Slovakia (1st place)	Age	Hometown	1st runner-up (2nd place)	2nd runner-up (3rd place)	Miss Universe Slovakia	Ref.
27	2023	Daniela Vojtasová	23	Dolný Kubín	Petra Siváková	Sonja Kopčanová	Kinga Puhová	

== Big Four pageants ==
=== Miss World Slovakia ===
Color key

- Declared as winner
- Ended as runner-up
- Ended as one of the finalists or semifinalists

The Miss Slovensko organization has become the national franchise holder for two of the Big Four international beauty pageants, namely: Miss World, Miss International, and since 2023, Miss Universe. The winner goes to Miss World, while the first runner-up is selected for Miss International.

Year	Miss World Slovakia	Region	Placement at Miss World	Special awards	Ref.
1993	Dana Vojtechovská	Bratislava	Unplaced		
1994	Karin Majtánová	Bratislava	Unplaced		
1995	Zuzana Špatinová	Bratislava	Unplaced		
1996	Linda Lenčová	Bratislava	Unplaced		
1997	Marietta Senkacová	Bratislava	Unplaced		
1998	Karolína Čičátková	Nové Zámky	Unplaced		
1999	Andrea Verešová	Žilina	Unplaced		
2000	Janka Horečná	Žilina	Unplaced		
2001	Jana Ivanová	Trenčín	Unplaced		
2002	Eva Verešová	Veľké Zálužie	Unplaced		
2003	Adriana Pospíšilová	Bratislava	Unplaced		
2004	Mária Sándorová	Čaňa	Unplaced		
2005	Ivica Sláviková	Bratislava	Unplaced		
2006	Magdaléna Šebestová	Bílkove Humence	Unplaced		
2007	Veronika Husárová	Komárno	Unplaced		
2008	Edita Krešáková	Seňa	Unplaced		
2009	Barbora Franeková	Žilina	Unplaced		
2010	Marína Georgievová	Banská Bystrica	Unplaced		
2011	Michaela Ňurciková	Nové Zámky	Unplaced		
2012	Kristína Krajčírová	Bratislava	Unplaced		
2013	Karolína Chomisteková	Oravský Podzámok	Top 20	Miss World Talent (Top 12); Miss World Sport (Top 20); Miss World Beach Beauty (Top 32)	
2014	Laura Longauerová	Detva	Unplaced		
2015	Lujza Straková	Banská Bystrica	Unplaced		
2016	Kristína Činčurová	Lučenec	Top 20		
2017	Hanka Závodná	Bratislava	Unplaced	Beauty with a Purpose (Top 20)	
2018	Dominika Grecová	Humenné	Unplaced		
2019	Frederika Kurtulíková	Bratislava	Unplaced	Miss World Talent (Top 27); Miss World Top Model (Top 40)	
2020	Due to the impact of the COVID-19 pandemic, no pageant was held in 2020.				
2021	Leona Novoberdaliu	Bratislava	Unplaced	Miss World Sport (Top 32)	
2022	Miss World 2021 was rescheduled to 16 March 2022 due to the COVID-19 pandemic outbreak in Puerto Rico; no pageant was held in 2022.				
2023	Sophia Hrivňáková	Banská Štiavnica	Unplaced		
2024	No competition held				
2025	Daniela Vojtasová	Dolný Kubín	Unplaced		

=== Miss Universe Slovakia ===
Color key

- Declared as winner
- Ended as runner-up
- Ended as one of the finalists or semifinalists

Year	Miss Universe Slovakia	Region	Placement at Miss Universe	Special awards	Ref.
2023	Kinga Puhová	Dunajská Streda	Unplaced		
2024	Petra Sivakova	Dunajská Streda	Unplaced		

=== Miss International Slovakia ===
Color key

- Declared as winner
- Ended as runner-up
- Ended as one of the finalists or semifinalists

Year	Miss International Slovakia	Hometown	Placement at Miss Internatioaanal	Ref.
1993	Karin Majtánová	Bratislava	Unplaced	
1994	Nikoleta Meszárošová	Rimavská Sobota	Unplaced	
1995	Jana Slúková		Miss Photogenic	
1996	Martina Jajcayová		Unplaced	
1997	Monika Coculová		Unplaced	
1998	Martina Kalmanová		Unplaced	
1999	Adela Bartková		Unplaced	
2000	Michaela Strahlová		Top 15	
2001	Barbara Pappová		Unplaced	
2002	Zuzana Gunišová		Unplaced	
2003	Simona Slobodníková		Unplaced	
2004	Aneta Kailingová		Unplaced	
2005	Lucia Debnárová		Unplaced	
2006	Dagmar Ivanová		Unplaced	
2007	Kristina Valušková		Unplaced	
2008	Lenka Sýkorová	Bratislava	Unplaced	
2009	Soňa Skoncová	Prievidza	Unplaced	
2010	Tatiana Kohútová	Bratislava	Unplaced	
2011	Dušana Lukáčová	Veľký Šariš	Unplaced	
2012	Denisa Krajčovičová	Bratislava	Unplaced	
2013	Nikoleta Duchoňová	Piešťany	Unplaced	
2014	Lucia Semanková	Bardejov	Unplaced	
2015	Barbora Bakošová	Bratislava	Unplaced	
2016	Michaela Meňkyová	Nitra	Unplaced	
2017	Petra Varaliová	Bardejov	Top 15	
2018	Radka Grendová	Revúca	Unplaced	
2019	Alica Ondrášová	Bratislava	Unplaced	
2020	Due to the impact of the COVID-19 pandemic, no pageant was held in 2020			
2021	Due to the impact of the COVID-19 pandemic, no pageant was held in 2021			
2022	Viktória Podmanická	Banská Bystrica	Unplaced	

== Minor pageants ==
=== Miss Supranational Slovakia ===
Color key

- Declared as winner
- Ended as runner-up
- Ended as one of the finalists or semifinalists

The 2nd runner-up is selected for Miss Supranational.

Year	Miss Supranational Slovakia	Hometown	Placement at Miss Supranational	Ref.
2013	Luciána Čvirková	Bratislava	Unplaced	
2014	Michaela Nguyenová		Did not compete	
2015	Petra Denková	Uhorské	Top 10	
2016	Lenka Tekeljaková	Liptovský Mikuláš	Top 10	
2017	Michaela Cmarková	Kanianka	Unplaced	
2018	Katarina Očovanova	Hriňová	Top 25	
2019	Natália Hrušovská	Nitra	Unplaced	
2020	Due to the impact of the COVID-19 pandemic, no pageant was held in 2020			
2021	Kristína Víglaská	Bratislava	Unplaced	
2022	Jana Vozárová	Púchov	Unplaced	
2023	Simona Leskovská	Bratislava	Unplaced	
2024	Petra Sivakova	Šamorín	Top 25	
2025	Did not compete			
2026	Did not compete			
