= Ulrika Nilsson =

Swedish journalist and newspresenter

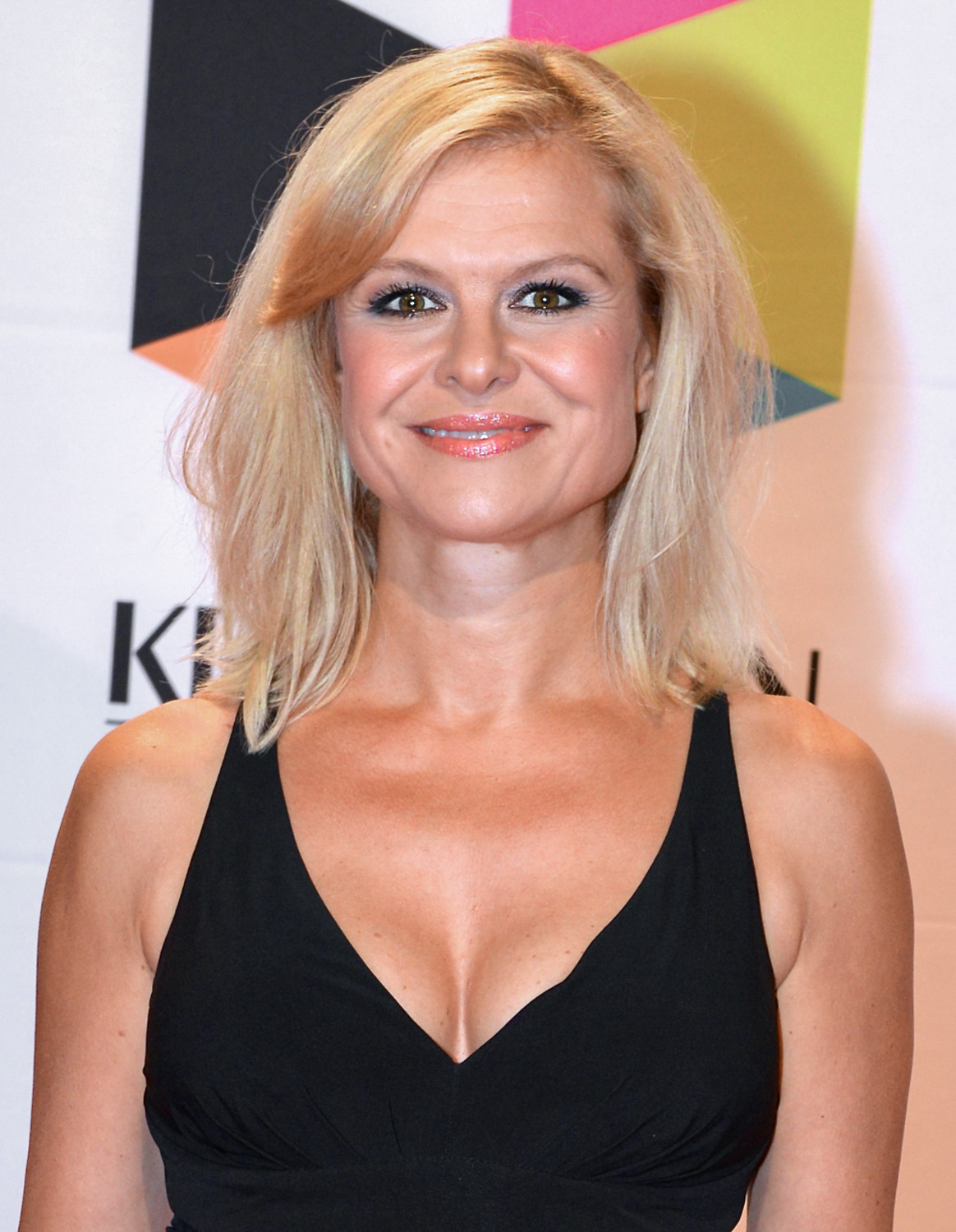
- Nilsson in 2013
- Born: 19 June 1965 (age 60)
- Occupation: Television presenter
- Known for: Nyhetsmorgon

Ulrika Nilsson (born 19 June 1965) is a Swedish journalist and news presenter who works for TV4, she has previously worked for CNN, TV3, SVT and several local news stations in USA. She has an American journalist degree. Nilsson studied journalism at the University of Kansas, USA for four years and graduated in 1989. After that she started working as a reporter for the local ABC-station in Topeka and later at the local NBC-station in Kansas City. After finishing that work she moved to Sweden again and started working as a presenter for The Wheel of Fortune (Lyckohjulet) which was broadcast on TV3, she also did work for TV4 and for the Gothenburg local news for SVT during the next couple of years.

At the start of the TV4 morning show Go'morron, now known as Nyhetsmorgon in 1992 she started working for the show as a weather girl. And in 1993 she became the men's magazine Café's best-known pinup girl for that year, after she appeared in a spread in one of the issues. After Nyhetsmorgon she moved to Atlanta and started working for CNN. She started her career there by writing news for the news presenters, she then moved on to become one of the channels news presenters herself and reporter. She lived in the United States for several years along with her mother.
