= Steven Oo =

Burmese-American TV personality and fashion designer

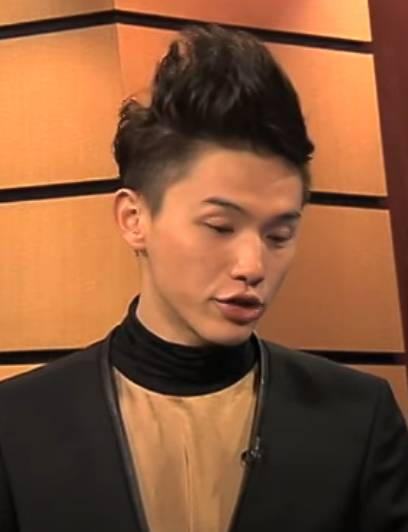
Oo in 2012

Steven Oo (born 10 November 1984), born Than Naing Oo (Burmese: သန်းနိုင်ဦး), is a Burmese-American TV personality and fashion designer of Sino-Burmese descent.

== Early life and education ==
Born in Yangon, Myanmar, Oo and his family immigrated to the United States at the age of 15. He received a BA from the University of California, Berkeley in 1997 and an MFA from the Academy of Art University in San Francisco in Fashion Knitwear Design in 2010.

== Career ==
His graduation collection debuted at the 2010 New York Fashion Week. He now focuses completely on innovative knitwear clothing designs.

Oo used his success in fashion to become a talk show personality in China. He is a permanent member of Informal Talks, a debate show produced by Bilibili and Hubei Television. He has been praised for his sarcasm and humorous aggression towards other members of the show. He has also made guest appearances on shows such as Go! Wardrobe.

== Personal life ==
Oo is openly gay. He has lived and worked in Shanghai, China, since 2013 though he travels often for television filming.
