= Arash Estilaf =

Iranian actor and TV presenter

- Born: Mohammadjavad Estilaf; Tehran, Iran
- Occupation(s): Actor, Television Presenter
- Website: https://www.arashestilaf.com

Arash Estilaf (Persian: آرش استیلاف), known as Hua Bobo (simplified Chinese: 华波波; traditional Chinese: 華波波; pinyin: Huà Bōbō), is an Iranian actor and television presenter active in China. His birth name is Mohammadjavad Estilaf. He was born in Tehran, Iran and moved to China when he was 17 years old.

Estilaf moved to Shanghai in 2006 and began studying Chinese at East China Normal University. He could speak Chinese after three months. He was a contestant in the first Chinese Bridge language competition for foreign students in 2008, and he finished in the top 10.

In 2010 he entered in the Shanghai Theatre Academy in a master's degree course in broadcasting and presenting, which he has now accomplished. He is now studying for a doctorate at the East China Normal University. Estilaf is fluent in Standard Mandarin and has made a name for himself on Chinese television with his humor. He can also speak Shanghainese and other languages like Korean and Russian.

== Television ==
Year	Title
2015	My Sunshine
2015	My Best Ex-Boyfriend
2016	Hi Dulala
2017	Ode to Joy 2
2018	Long Time No See
2018	Made in Iran
2019	Go Go Squid
2020	He is Not That into You

== Television ==
Year	Title
2014	Comedian Talent Show
2015	Chand shanbeh ba sina
2015	Informal Talks
2022	International versions of Wheel of Fortune
