= Informal Talks =

Chinese talk show

- Genre: talk-variety show
- Directed by: Chen Juan, Wan Longhua, Wang Ziting, Gu Xueying, Zhang Longfu, Ma Xiao
- Starring: Da Zuo, Yang Di, Chen Ming, Chen Chao, Brian Gonzalez, Dylan Jaye, Sasha Chzhao, Idris Kartav, Steven Oo, Ichinose Asuka, Ben McMahon, Alex Martini, Kyle Obermann
- Opening theme: Season 1 Sugar by Maroon 5 We Like 2 Party by Big Bang; What Makes You Beautiful by One Direction Season 2 Shadowfall by Audiomachine; Shut Up and Dance by Walk the Moon; Season 3 Blood and Wine by Marcin Przybyłowicz; New York Memories by Borislav Slavov; Les Champs-Élysées by Joe Dassin; Sunny Day by Joy Williams; Legacy of Six by Really Slow Motion; Season 5 Pay It Later by Joshua Francois & Franco Junior; Wake Me Up (cover) by Madilyn Bailey Season 6 Walk Thru Fire by Vicetone (ft. Meron Ryan)
- Country of origin: China
- Original language: Chinese
- No. of seasons: 6

Production
- Production location: China
- Running time: 80 minutes

Original release
- Network: Hubei Television
- Release: April 24, 2015 – present

Informal Talks (simplified Chinese: 非正式会谈; traditional Chinese: 非正式會談; pinyin: Fēi Zhèngshì Huìtán) is a Chinese talk show co-produced by Bilibili and Hubei Television. Informal Talks airs on Hubei Television and Heilongjiang Television on Fridays at 21:20 beginning April 24, 2015.

Starting Season 1 Episode 5, every episode begins with a Culture Discussion (Chinese: 全球文化相对论; pinyin: Quánqiú Wénhuà Xiāngduìlùn), followed by debates related to the discussion topic (Chinese: 提案环节; pinyin: Tíàn Huánjié), where representatives can share their opinions. The show discusses various topics and issues in Mandarin. The atmosphere is meant to emulate a meeting of world leaders, but the tone of the show can range from serious to emotional to humorous.

== Series overview ==
In Season 1, there were 20 regular episodes, and 3 special episodes (Episode 17, 18, 23). In Season 2, there were 46 regular episodes and 3 special episodes that look back at certain moments on the show. Season 6 consisted of 8 episodes filmed in the studio in Beijing, and 16 episodes filmed remotely due to the COVID-19 pandemic.

Season	Episodes		Originally released	
Season	Episodes		First released	Last released
1	23	20	April 24, 2015	October 2, 2015
1	23	3	August 21, 2015	October 2, 2015
2	50	46	December 11, 2015	November 11, 2016
2	50	4	November 18, 2015	December 2, 2016
3	61	59	December 9, 2016	April 27, 2018
3	61	2	November 3, 2017	December 1, 2017
4	12		June 29, 2018	September 14, 2018
5	12		May 17, 2019	August 2, 2019
6	24		January 17, 2020	August 7, 2020

== Hosts ==
The panel consists of a "President" (Chinese: 会长; pinyin: Huìzhǎng), a "Vice President" (Chinese: 副会长; pinyin: Fù Huìzhǎng), a “Secretary General" (Chinese: 秘书长; pinyin: Mìshūzhǎng), a "Clerk" (Chinese: 书记官; pinyin: Shūjì guān) and "representatives" from different countries.

=== Current Hosts ===
Name	Chinese name	Birthday	Title	Episodes	Absences
Da Zuo (Ryan)	大左	July 29, 1985 (age 41)	President	S1 E5 - present	S3 E56, 57
Yang Di (Andy)	杨迪	August 26, 1986 (age 39)	Vice President	S2 E1 - present	
Yang Di (Andy)	杨迪	August 26, 1986 (age 39)	Clerk	S1 E5 - E23	S1 E10, 11
Chen Ming (Calvin)	陈铭	April 7, 1988 (age 38)	Secretary General	S2 E22 - 25, 32 - 39, 44 - 47; S3 E1 - present	S3 E33; S5 E5-9, 12
Chen Chao (Cynthia)	陈超	October 24, 1989 (age 36)	Clerk	S1 E1 - present	S2 E38, 39; S3 E13 - 16; S5 E7, 8

=== Past Substitute Hosts ===
Name	Chinese name	Birthday	Title	Episodes
Liu Yiwei	刘仪伟	April 28, 1969 (age 57)	President	S1 E1 - E4
Yuan Chengjie	袁成杰	March 10, 1983 (age 43)	Vice President	S1 E1 - E4
Ma Weiwei (Vivian)	马薇薇		Vice President	S1 E5 - E23
Ma Weiwei (Vivian)	马薇薇		Secretary General	S1 E1 - S1 E4
Huang Yixin	黄艺馨	November 16, 1982 (age 43)	Clerk	S1 E10, 11
Li Yitong	李艺彤	December 23, 1995 (age 30)	Secretary General	S2 E1, 2, 3, 5, 9, 10
Chen Si	陈思	September 14, 1991 (age 34)	Secretary General	S2 E4, 7
Yu Shasha	于莎莎	May 30, 1985 (age 41)	Secretary General	S2 E6, 8, 11, 12, 17 - 20, 31
Xie Binbin	谢彬彬	December 20, 1995 (age 30)	Secretary General	S2 E13, 14
Shao Mingming	邵明明	October 25, 1996 (age 29)	Secretary General	S2 E15, 16
Jiang Chen (Joanna)	姜尘	November 27, 1987 (age 38)	Secretary General	S2 E26 - 30
Liu Xiye	刘熙烨		Clerk	S2 E38, 39
Jiang Tao	江涛		Secretary General	S2 E40, 43
Zang Hongna	臧洪娜	June 28	Secretary General	S2 E41, 42
Zhang Yu'an	张玉安		Secretary General	S3 E33
Li Songwei	李松蔚		Secretary General	S5 E7-9

== Representatives ==
In Season 1, there were 10 representatives of Informal Talks (known as IT10): Brian Gonzalez, Beijing International Studies University international business student; Arash Estilaf, actor and PhD Film Studies student; YOYO, model; Giuseppe Mighali, Suhrobjon Nazarov, Renmin University of China student; Alexandre Dubos, founder of French-Street (wine company); Nathaus Patrick, Audi executive; Kim Han-il (Jack), singer; Zack Ireland Splittgerber, actor and Mohammed Osama, Xinhua News Agency journalist. After Episode 4, Giuseppe Mighali left due to work related reasons and was replaced by Alec Odahara, marketing manager, in Episode 5. After Episode 15, Suhrobjon Nazarov left to serve in the Russian Army and was replaced by Vladislav Shergin in Episode 17. At the end of Season 1, Alexandre Dubos and Nathaus Patrick left due to work related reasons.

In Season 2, there were 11 representatives (IT11). Alistair Bayley, Monash University arts student; James Ifeanyi Ogbobe, tourism management student and kindergarten teacher; and Steven Oo, fashion designer joined the cast. At the end of Season 2, Steven Oo left due to work related reasons. Mohammed Osama, Zach Ireland Splittgerber, and Vladislav Shergin announced on Weibo that they were informed by the producers of Informal Talks they would not continue to be representatives in Season 3. Kim Han-il (Jack) left for unknown reasons.

In Season 3, Cedric Jun Jie Loo (guest representative in Season 2 Episode 13), actor and model; Mirco Tranchina, Beijing Normal University Linguistics student; Sasha, Harbin Engineering University international business student; Idris Kartav, Xiamen University International Relations and Affairs student and Dominic Romeo joined the cast. After Season 3, Mirco left due to immigration difficulties, and Alec and James left due to work. In Season 3.5, they were replaced with Dylan Jaye, an investment banker; Brian O'Shea and Patrick Köllmer.

=== Current Representatives ===
Country	Name	Chinese name	Occupation	Birthday	Since	Absences
Argentina; Spain	Brian Alejandro; Gonzalez Ruiz	功必扬	BISU International; Business student	April 13, 1991 (age 35)	S1 E1	S4 E8
Russia	Aleksandr "Sasha"; Chzhao	萨沙	HRBEU International; Business student	September 29, 1998 (age 27)	S3 E1	S3 E5, 6, 46; S4 E5-8; S5 E4
Italy	Alessandro Martini	阿雷	Student	June 19, 1996 (age 30)	S6 E1	
United Kingdom	Harry Moore	欧阳森			S6.5	
South Africa	Brett Lyndall Singh	阿乐	Medical Technology Entrepreneur		S6 E9	S6, E12 - 13
United States	Zach Bielak	小白/姜海			S6.5	
Norway	Gustav Gillund	顾思达			S6.5	
Japan	Takeuchi Ryo	竹内亮			S6.5	
Cameroon	Challi	沙力			S6.5	
Myanmar	Steven Oo (Than Naing Oo)	赖合成 OO	Fashion Designer	November 10, 1984 (age 41)	S2 E1-E47; S6 E1	S2 E36, 44 - 47

=== Past Representatives ===
Season 2 Cast - Vlad Shergin, Mohammed Osama, James Ogbobe, Jack Kim, Alec Odahara, Brian Gonzalez, Alistair Bayley, Yūsuke Asai, Arash Estilaf, Steven Oo, Zach Ireland

Country	Name	Chinese name	Occupation	Birthday	Episodes	Absences	Returns
Italy	Giuseppe Mighali	朱赛	Researcher in Chinese; Classical Philology		S1 E1 - 4		
Russia; Tajikistan	Suhrobjon Nazarov	阿克毛	Student	November 20, 1993 (age 32)	S1 E1 - 15	S1 E14	S3 E5, 6, 25
France	Alexandre Dubos	杜波		1986	S1 E1 - 23		S2 E15, 16; S4 E8
Germany	Nathaus Patrick	潘天楷	Audi Executive		S1 E1 - 23	S1 E5 - 7, 9 - 12	S2 E4, 6 - 8, 33, 34; S3 E15, 16
South Korea	Jack Kim (Kim Han-il) †	金韩一	Singer	June 4, 1990	S1 E1 - S2 E47	S2 E25, 41 - 47	
United States	Zach Mark; Ireland Splittgerber	左右		February 13, 1990 (age 36)	S1 E1 - S2 E47	S2 E2, 4, 6 - 8	
Egypt	Mohamed Osama; Mohamed Ragab	穆小龙	Translator	September 6, 1988 (age 37)	S1 E1 - S2 E47		S3 E18 - 22, 25; S4 E5
Russia	Vladislav; Aleksandrovich Shergin	卷弗/弗拉德		October 15, 1990 (age 35)	S1 E17 - S2 E47		S4 E6
United Kingdom; Australia	Alec; Odahara	田原皓	Marketing manager	February 9, 1990 (age 36)	S1 E5 - S3 E40	S2 E27 - 30; S3 E28, 34 - 40	
Nigeria	James Ifeanyi; Ogbobe	钱多多	Tourism; Management student	1988	S2 E1 - S3 E40	S2 E35	
Italy	Mirco Tranchina	米可	BNU Linguistics student	June 26, 1991 (age 35)	S3 E1 - 40	S3 E13, 14, 18; 19, 28 - 30, 34, 37 - 40	S5 E9, 10
Japan	Yūsuke Asai	浅井悠佑; YOYO	Model	September 15, 1985 (age 40)	S1 E1 - S3 E61	S2 E36 - 43; S3 E25	
Malaysia	Cedric Jun Jie Loo	吕锐 吕俊杰	Model, actor	1988	S3 E1 - 61		
Italy; Argentina	Brian O'Shea	波波		April 10, 1993 (age 33)	S3 E41 - 61		
Germany	Patrick Köllmer	吴雨翔		September 16, 1988 (age 37)	S3 E41 - 61	S3 E46	
France	Wilfried Buiron	阮奕信	Student, Entrepreneur	September 2, 1995 (age 30)	S4 E1 - 12		S5 E6
Iran	Arash Estilaf	华波波	Actor, Film Studies student	August 28, 1988 (age 37)	S1 E1 - S5 E12	S4 E8 (start)	
Australia; United Kingdom	Alistair Bayley	贝乐泰	Monash; Arts student	May 26, 1993 (age 33)	S2 E1 - S5 E12	S2 E2, 32 - 35, 45, 46; S3 E29, 30	
United States	Dominic Joseph; Romeo	罗狮杰	Student	1992	S3 E1 - S5 E12	S4 E1 (end), 2	
United Kingdom	Russell	成明	Student		S5 E1 - S5 E12	S5 E4, 9, 10	
United States; Italy	Dylan Jaye	钟逸伦	Investment Banker; Musician	October 22, 1995 (age 30)	S3 E41	S4 E9, 10	
South Africa	Mark Minnie Jr.	宁大人	Student	May 9, 1994 (age 32)	S4 E1		
India; Thailand	Siwathep Singh; Khanderpor	天乐	Student	June 4, 1993 (age 33)	S4 E1	S5 E5, 6	
Japan	Ichinose Asuka	一之瀬飞鸟	Video blogger	1995	S4 E1		
United States	Kyle Obermann	欧阳凯	Photographer		S6 E1		
Australia	Ben McMahon	孟杰明	Real Estate Developer		S6 E1		
Turkey	Idris Talha Kartav †	唐小强	Stone Importer	August 24, 1992	S3 E1		S3 E18 - 22; S4 E5-8

=== Guest Representatives ===
Country	Name	Chinese name	Birthday	Episodes
Brazil	Kevin Tai	戴启明	1992 - 1993	S1 E1 (cut from episode), E14
Spain	Antonio Coll (Nio)	蓝子龙	March 11, 1989 (age 37)	S1 E3, 16
Ukraine	Yegor Shyshov	椰果	May 22, 1989 (age 37)	S1 E5
Canada	Brendan Frentz	范柏仁		S1 E6
Australia		小白		S1 E10
United States	Martin	马丁	1986 - 1987	S1 E10
United States		龙小龙	2001	S1 E11
New Zealand	Patrick Rosevear	罗斯文	June 24, 1987 (age 39)	S1 E14, 21
Spain	David Garcia Lou	搂大卫	October 25	S1 E15
Italy	Anthony	安东尼	May 9, 1990 (age 36)	S1 E15, 33
Spain	Gerald	杰拉德		S1 E19
Cameroon	David	大卫		S1 E20
Egypt		周晓龙		S1 E22
India	Mani	马尼	August 22	S2 E2
United States		罗罗		S2 E3
South Africa	Oliver	奥利/赵子玉	August 11	S2 E4, 7, 35
Italy	Andre	安德		S2 E5
Sweden	Markus	张维		S2 E6; S3 E2, 3
United States		李越	December 30, 1992 (age 33)	S2 E6, 8, 31
Spain	Isa	伊萨		S2 E8, 31
United States	Paul Craddock	美保/美宝	October 14, 1993 (age 32)	S2 E9
Italy	Jacopo Maria Lasala	徐天佑		S2 E10
Germany	Simon Dominic	西蒙		S2 E11, 12
Malaysia	Cedric Jun Jie Loo	吕锐/吕俊杰		S2 E13
Switzerland	Franco Lodovico Maglio	弗朗克		S2 E14
France		方兴为		S2 E17, 18
Thailand	Palang Jakkrawansilp	帕朗		S2 E19
Brazil	Eduardo de Carvalho Rodrigues Filho	栎树		S2 E20
United States	Josh Gordon	戈登		S2 E21, 29, 30, 32, 35; S3 E21, 22
Italy	David	伟鸥	1992	S2 E22
Turkey	Yasin	亚星	September 28, 1993 (age 32)	S2 E23
Italy	Mauri	风明睿		S2 E24
United Kingdom	Elliot O'Donnell	董锦程	1993 - 1994	S2 E25
Italy	Riccardo Moratto (Skanda)	韦佳德	December 4, 1985 (age 40)	S2 E26
Switzerland	Machi	马喜	August 15, 1981 (age 45)	S2 E27
Belgium	Romuald Bronchart	彭望龙	June 24, 1989 (age 37)	S2 E28
Russia	Gaudi	高迪		S2 E32
Japan	Nakamura Onishi	中村大西		S2 E36
France	Pascal Bonnisseau	宋博宁	July 2, 1981 (age 45)	S2 E36, 37, 41 - 46; S3 E9 - 11, 37 - 40
France	Quentin Albert	信誓蛋蛋 (钢蛋)		S2 E38, 39
France	Romeo Delebecque	信誓蛋蛋 (铁蛋)		S2 E38, 39
Thailand		徐才文		S2 E39
Germany	Constantin	康廷	January 11, 1987 (age 39)	S2 E40
Japan	Tsukagoshi Hirotaka	冢越博隆	April 18, 1978 (age 48)	S2 E42, 43; S3 E13, 14
France		晓冬		S2 E43
Russia	Andrey	安德烈		S2 E44
Australia		黎昕		S2 E45, 46
Bangladesh	Rashed	瑞江明		S2 E45
Netherlands	Sander Kole	柯桑德	September 19, 1994 (age 31)	S2 E46
Uzbekistan	Kamol Munisov	康晓鑫		S3 E23
United Kingdom	Mark	马克		S3 E26
Costa Rica	Rodley	罗德利		S3 E27
Germany	David	江南		S3 E28, 34
Thailand		范桂忠		S3 E28
Thailand		兴川瑞		S3 E29, 30
United States		马爱文		S3 E30
Japan		坂尚		S3 E31
Italy; Argentina	Brian O'Shea	波波	April 10	S3 E34
Brazil	Uyan Tien	田舞阳	August 1, 1985 (age 41)	S3 E35, 36
Germany	Patrick Köllmer	吴雨翔	September 16, 1988 (age 37)	S3 E37, 38
United States; Italy	Dylan Jaye	钟逸伦	October 22, 1995 (age 30)	S3 E39
United Kingdom	Laurence Heyes	何安杰	January 1, 1995 (age 31)	S3 E46
United Kingdom		葛金鹰		S3 E49
Israel	Raz Galor	高佑思	September 28, 1994 (age 31)	S3 E50, 51; S5 E8
Lebanon	Michael	卡子彤		S3 E53
United States	Lila Kidson	星悦		S3 E54
Somalia		莫哈		S3 E56
Thailand	Phichet Ang	洪健城		S3 E57
Egypt		王力宏		S3 E59
Brazil	Vinicius Batista de Oliveira	欧力	September 17, 1991 (age 27)	S4 E5
Germany		发币		S4 E6
China	Oscar Sun	孙坚	May 23, 1983 (age 43)	S4 E7
Venezuela; Spain		文楷		S4 E8
DRC		龙儿		S4 E9
United Kingdom		梁悦信		S4 E10
United States	Stephen Turban	唐文理		S5 E3
Sudan		白石		S5 E4
Democratic Republic of the Congo	Elie Kipanga	苏阳		S5 E5
Poland	Philip	菲利普		S5 E7
Japan	Yamashita Tomohiro	山下智博		S5 E11
Egypt; Palestine		刘正曦		S6 E5
France		广坦	1983 (age 37)	S6 E7
Japan	Erica	林绘梨华		S6 E7
Belgium	Gianni Girolami	杰宁	1988	S6 E8
Malaysia	Joey Chua	蔡卓宜		S6 E9
Malaysia	Yan Rujing	颜如晶		S6 E10

== Similar shows ==
=== South Korean show ===
Non-Summit is the original show. It is produced by Korean television company JTBC and features handsome Korean-speaking foreign men discussing a wide range of political and social issues.

In 2015, a Non-Summit spin-off aired called Where is My Friend's Home. The show features the cast of Non-Summit and was filmed across 12 different countries.

=== Turkish franchise ===
In 2014, atv purchased the rights for a Turkish adaptation of Non-Summit, titled Elİn Oğlu, which premiered on 21 March 2015.

=== Chinese franchises ===
In 2015, Jiangsu Television purchased the rights for a Chinese adaptation of Non-Summit, titled A Bright World (世界青年说), which premiered on 16 April 2015.
