= Brett Lyndall Singh =

South African medical doctor

- Born: 29 March 1993 (age 32); Pietermaritzburg, South Africa
- Education: Tsinghua University, Wenzhou University, Wenzhou Medical University, University of Melbourne
- Alma mater: Tsinghua University
- Occupations: Paediatric Doctor; Healthcare entrepreneur

Brett Lyndall Singh (born 29 March 1993) is a South African medical doctor and healthcare entrepreneur. He is the Chairperson of the South African National Department of Trade, Industry and Competition's national Healthcare Products Masterplan Global Value Chain Working Group. He is also CEO of Alpha and Omega MedTech and its subsidiaries as well as executive director of Opulent Entertainment Group.

== Early life ==
Brett Lyndall Singh was born in Pietermaritzburg, South Africa and grew up in uMngeni, Howick, KwaZulu-Natal. He attended his early education at Howick Preparatory School then his secondary education at St. Charles College, Pietermaritzburg.

== Career ==
Brett Lyndall Singh started his career in 2010 doing vocational training at Greys Hospital. In 2011, he relocated to China and enrolled at Wenzhou Medical University, studying Bachelor of Medicine, Bachelor of Surgery. He earned recognition during the initial outbreak of COVID-19 when he was recruited to a special anti-pandemic task force unit which worked on establishing the clinical protocol for five infected Pediatric Patients, those protocols were shared with various governments to help prepare for the pandemic and earned him an honoree at the China national COVID-19 Commendations Ceremony presided over by president Xi Jinping, being one of two African Doctors acknowledged and the only South African to receive this. He is now the Paediatric representative for Forum on China-Africa Cooperation (FOCAC) Healthcare Leaders Roundtable.

Singh was listed on the Forbes 30 Under 30, Class of 2022 (Healthcare and Business Category) and subsequently made the Cover of the Forbes Africa Magazine (June/July) as well as the Mail & Guardian 200 Young South Africans 2022 in partnership with the National Lotteries Commission.

Brett Singh is the founder of Alpha & Omega MedTech, a Subsidiary of Alpha & Omega (AOM) Group. In 2021 Alpha and Omega MedTech received a Medical Device Establishment licence from South African Health Products Regulatory Authority. In July 2021 his company facilitated a historic R25 Million donation worth of Orient Gene Rapid Test Kits to the South African Medical Research Council, for Vaccine Clinical Trial Research and over 400K PPE to the Eastern Cape Government and Johannesburg Children's Orphanage, working with Blazing Youth Community, DGMT Foundation and University of Witwatersrand . This rapid diagnostics technology was presented at the first international conference on public health in Africa, by Centers for Disease Control Africa. He has published National Health Institute Funded Peer and reviewed scientific articles on Elsevier Brain Research Bulletin.

Based on Singh's thesis published at the Geneva Challenge 2020, a product called Alpha & Omega NutriPowder developed under iLifeAfrica Digital Healthcare Platform is the world's first China-Africa initiative combating Sub-Saharan African Paediatric Malnutrition. This MedTech startup competed in over 40 global competitions and was a finalist at the United Nations 75th Anniversary University Startup World Cup through which he was named OTEC Entrepreneur of the Year. He also manages a China Africa Technology incubator in Beijing partnered with HICOOL, DongSheng Science Park and The Innovation Hub Management Company South Africa. Brett was named as the World Economic Forum Global Shaper, selected for the WEF's Annual Meeting of the New Champions and was the delegate for SA at the G20 Young Entrepreneur Alliance in Milan in 2021.

Brett Singh is a panelist on Bilibili's Informal Talks, a Chinese series with this season garnering a 9.4/10 rating and over 120 million viewers. He is a speaker at TEDx, Google for Startups and Global Leadership Summit organized events.

As a Science Citation Index published researcher, he has contributed to a number of forums including Global Vaccine Symposium, United Nations Global Compact participant, Center for China and Globalization Global Young Leaders Dialogue, World Young Scientist Summit, World Federation for Young Scientists, World Health Forum, China Africa Economic & Trade Institute.
