= Karin Majtánová =

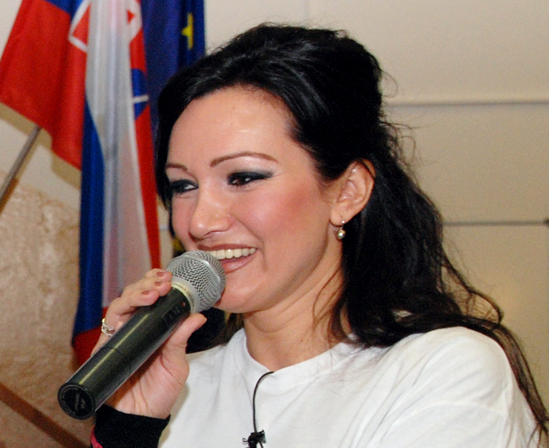
- Majtánová in 2011
- Born: 1 February 1974 (age 51); Trenčín, Czechoslovakia
- Occupation: TV presenter

Karin Majtánová (born 1 February 1974) is a Slovak actress, tv host, model and beauty pageant titleholder who won Miss Slovakia 1993 and then represented her country at both Miss International 1993 and Miss World 1994 but did not place at either of the two contests. Majtánová also placed as 1st Runner-Up at the Miss Czech and Slovak Republic 1993 pageant. She has presented television programmes on Slovenská televízia among other stations.
