= VTV (Salvadoran TV channel) =

VTV was a television channel in El Salvador, operated by Telecorporación Salvadoreña. The channel transmitted on UHF channel 35 and relayed Univision programming.

The channel, unlike the other TCS channels, was 24/7 and didn't link with channels 2, 4 and 6 in the morning hours.

As of September 25, 2017, the channel is called now as TCS+.
