= Miljonlotteriet =

Miljonlotteriet is a Swedish lottery company owned by IOGT-NTO, and incorporated in 1964. Stig Kroon established the organization in its current form.

Miljonlotteriet is a Swedish state licensed lottery operator, fully owned by and incorporated in the charity organization, IOGT-NTO. The whole surplus thus goes to IOGT-NTO. During the past 15 years, Miljonlotteriet has contributed a surplus of more than SEK 1.6 billion to the non – profitable work of IOGT-NTO.

Miljonlotteriet is one of the leading lotteries on the Scandinavian market with more than 50 years’ of profitable experience.

Miljonlotteriet was the first lottery operator to offer subscription of scratch tickets to customers. Years later, Miljonlotteriet, continues to offer offline scratch tickets both as subscription and also as scratch tickets supplied by retailers. To meet the changes in the market and customer needs the product portfolio has grown and now includes online games such as scratch tickets and bingo.

The scratch ticket Miljonlotteriet, is the second most sold scratch ticket in Sweden.

The lottery is supervised by the Swedish Gaming Board.

Miljonlotteriet is situated in Mölnlycke, Sweden and has 60 employees.
