= Randi Rahm =

American fashion designer

- Born: New York City, United States

Randi Rahm is an American fashion designer based in New York City and raised on Long Island. She is a classically trained concert pianist and musician. She is well known for her couture gowns, bridal wear and evening wear collections and her wide range of clientele, including celebrities and socialites.

== Career ==
Rahm is a classically trained conductor and concert pianist with Degrees in Art, History and Music.

Rahm has made wedding gowns and has dressed celebrities ranging from artists such as Carrie Underwood, Beyoncé Knowles, Mariah Carey, Ashanti, Fergie, Starla Smith to actresses such as Catherine Zeta-Jones, Halle Berry, Jennifer Love Hewitt, Katherine Heigl, Hayden Panettiere, Eva Mendes, Eva Longoria, and Nikki Reed along with various other celebrities.

Rahm's designs were featured on the hit ABC reality show The Bachelorette. Ashley Herbert wore one of Rahm's designs in the live "Will you accept the rose?" episode.
