= Anat Elimelech =

Israeli fashion model (1974–1997)

- ענת אלימלך
- Born: 8 March 1974; Jerusalem, Israel
- Died: 2 December 1997 (aged 23); Jerusalem, Israel
- Occupations: Fashion model; actress
- Known for: Winner of the "Queen of Grace" title at the Miss Israel pageant; Israeli fashion model and actress in children's television; Victim of a high-profile murder-suicide case

Anat Elimelech (Hebrew: ענת אלימלך; 8 March 1974 – 2 December 1997) was an Israeli fashion model and an actress who played in commercials and television shows for children. Elimelech was a victim of a murder–suicide in 1997 in which her boyfriend David Afuta killed her and then committed suicide.

== Biography ==
Elimelech was born in Jerusalem in 1974 to Billy and Avi. In her youth, she studied in a high school in Gilo. In 1991, she won the first place in Jerusalem's "Miss Kenyon" beauty pageant, and then began modeling for the modeling agency "Look". During the Contest "Miss Kenyon" beauty pageant she met the successful hairdresser David Afuta (who had many high-profile clients such as the then Prime Minister's wife Sara Netanyahu amongst others), who was 14 years older than her, and they soon became a couple.

In 1993, Elimelech participated in the Miss Israel beauty pageant and won the title "Queen of Grace" (מלכת החן).

In 1995, Elimelech received a lot of media exposure when she competed in an ongoing segment held during the Israeli version of the game show "Wheel of Fortune" during which contestants competed for the role of the new "Wheel Girl". Although she was very popular she eventually did not become the new "Wheel Girl".

In 1996, Elimelech participated in the children's video tape "Efrochim" (אפרוחים) together with Asi Levi, Sherry Brzezinski and Sharon Tzur. During the same year she also participated in the children's video tape "Making A Movie: Golden Heart Flower" (עושים סרט: פרח לב הזהב) together with Vicki Tavor, Mali Chofesh and Tamar Milstein.

During 1996, Elimelech also starred in the TV commercials for the Israeli supermarket chain "Hiperkol" (היפרכל).

During the summer of 1997, Elimelech hosted the TV show "HaChofesh HaGadol" (החופש הגדול) in the Israeli Educational Television. That same year, her relations with David Afuta worsened and as a result subsequently she moved back in with her father and his second wife. During the same year Elimelech was supposed to participate in the annual Israeli singing show "The Festigal" with the song "Ballerina", which subsequently was performed by the participants of the Festigal in her memory after her death. On the evening of December 1, 1997, the day before her death, Elimelech appeared along with the other participants of the Festigal Dudu Topaz's entertainment show on Channel 2.

=== The murder and the investigation ===
In the morning of December 2, 1997 Elimelech was found dead along with her boyfriend, David Afuta, in their home in the Ramat Beit HaKerem neighborhood in Jerusalem. She was shot once while he was shot twice.

Shortly before the murder, Elimelech's father requested the police to confiscate Afuta's personal weapon, for fear that he might use it against Elimelech, although the weapon was never taken from Afuta because Elimelech demanded that the complaint be canceled.

Preliminary investigations of the crime scene revealed that Elimelech was the one who shot Afuta and then committed suicide. The initial presumption, by which Elimelech was the murderer, was because the bodies were found with the gun in Elimelech's hand. Due to these findings, Elimelech was buried in the suicide plot of the Jewish cemetery Har HaMenuchot in Jerusalem, in accordance with Jewish burial customs.

Nevertheless, due to pressure from Elimelech's family, a month after the murder the police conducted a second investigation in which they discovered that the original team of investigators were negligent and that in fact Afuta shot Elimelech and then killed himself. It was also discovered that Afuta's brother arrived on the scene of the crime first, before the police, and in order to obscure the evidence, he moved the gun from Afuta's hand to Elimelech's hand. Although this fact was verified in laboratory tests the prosecution decided, with the support of the police, not to initiate legal proceedings against Afuta's brother and he was released. According to the findings of the renewed police investigation, in the last years of her life Elimelech tried several times to leave Afuta, but Afuta did not let her go and threatened to commit suicide if she left him and as a result she always went back to him.

The findings of the second investigation were published three weeks after the murder. Elimelech's remains were only moved from the suicide plot of the Har HaMenuchot cemetery to the main burial section of the cemetery in 2001, four years after her death.

=== Court ruling ===
In 2004, Elimelech's father and brother filed a lawsuit against David Afuta's brother Joseph Afuta, demanding that the court would formally determine that Afuta was the murderer, and demanded a compensation of 8.4 million NIS. Eventually, on 1 March 2011 justice Menachem Cohen formally ruled that the murder was committed by David Aftuta who afterwards committed suicide. He also determined that his brother, Joseph Afuta, tampered with the evidence in the crime scene with the intention of incriminating Elimelech. As a result, the court ruled that Joseph would compensate Elimelech's family with 300,000 NIS.
