= Hubei Television =

Television network in Hubei province

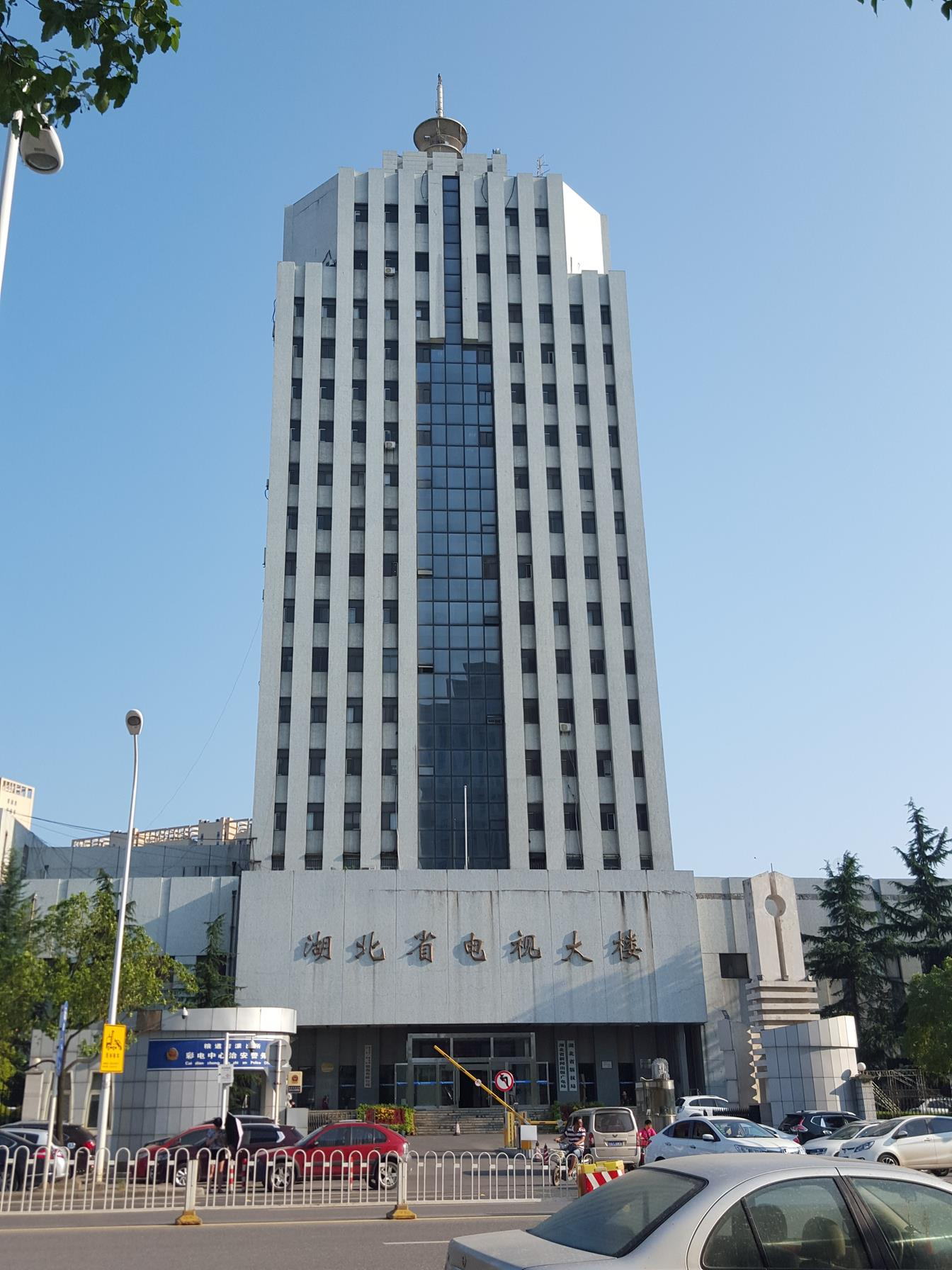
- Hubei Television building
- Headquarters: Wuhan, Hubei, China

History
- Launched: March 2006

Links
- Website: www.hbtv.com.cn

Hubei Television (simplified Chinese: 湖北电视台; traditional Chinese: 湖北電視台; pinyin: Húběi Diànshìtái) is a television network in Hubei province. Programming includes the shows Informal Talks (非正式会谈) and Unlocking the Secrets of Chinese Characters (汉字解密).

The television station opened on December 1, 1960 and began regular broadcasts on September 15, 1965. The satellite channel began broadcasting on January 1, 1997.
