= Bílkove Humence =

- Municipality
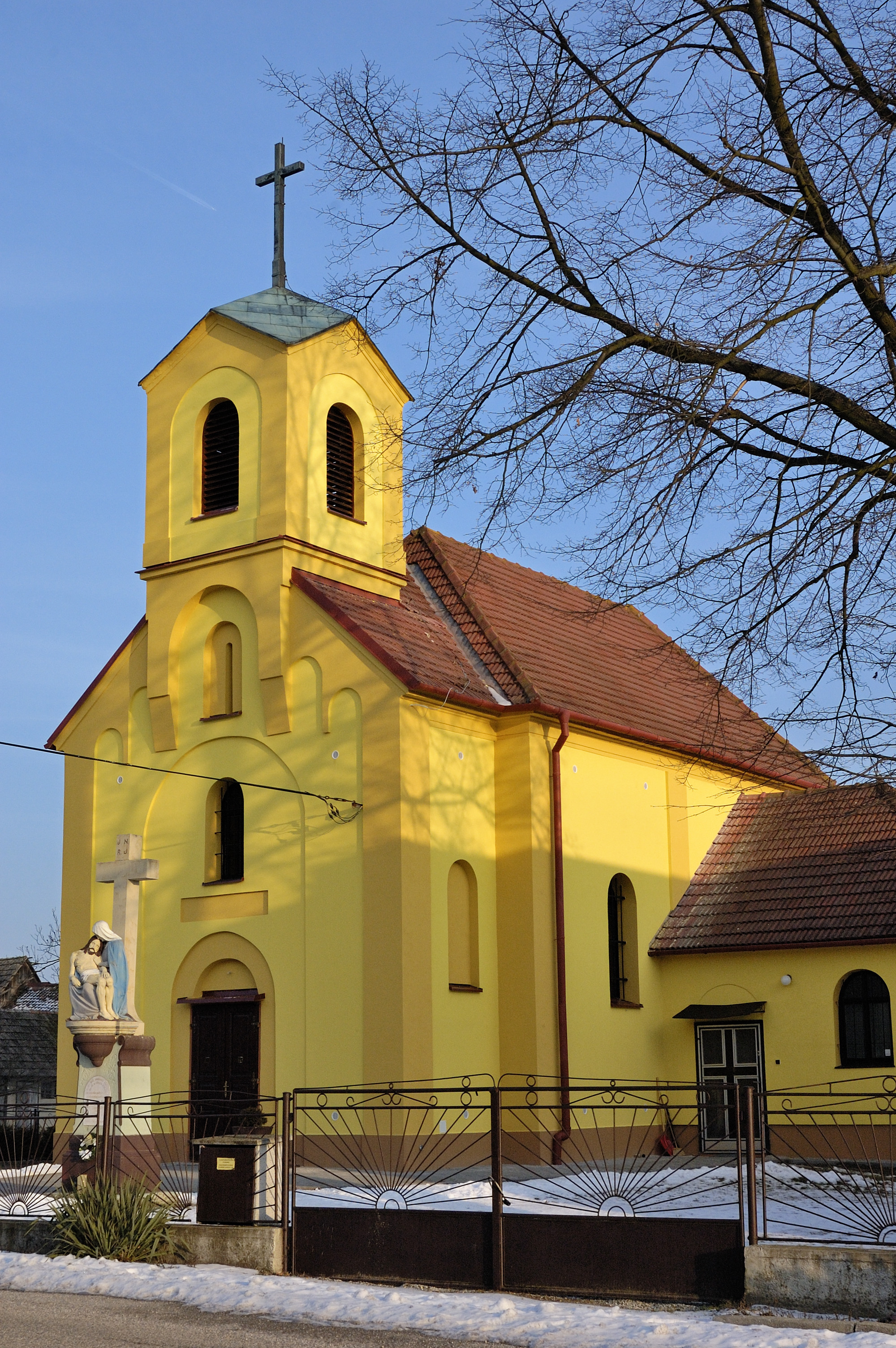

- Flag

- Location of Bílkove Humence in the Trnava Region Location of Bílkove Humence in Slovakia
- Coordinates: 48.58°N 17.23°E
- Country: Slovakia
- Region: Trnava Region
- District: Senica District
- First mentioned: 1828

Area
  - Total: 4.09 km^{2} (1.58 sq mi)
- Elevation: 242 m (794 ft)

Population (2025)
  - Total: 192
- Time zone: UTC+1 (CET)
  - Summer (DST): UTC+2 (CEST)
- Postal code: 908 77
- Area code: +421 34
- Vehicle registration plate (until 2022): SE
- Website: bilkovehumence.sk

Bílkove Humence (Hungarian: Bilkaudvar) is a village and municipality in Senica District in the Trnava Region of western Slovakia.

== History ==
In historical records the village was first mentioned in 1848.

== Geography ==
The municipality lies at an altitude of 242 metres (794 ft) and covers an area of 4.09 km^{2} (1.58 sq mi) (2025).

== Population ==
Population statistic (10 years)
Year	1995	2005	2015	2025
Count	240	220	206	192
Difference		−8.33%	−6.36%	−6.79%

Population statistic
Year	2024	2025
Count	194	192
Difference		−1.03%

It has a population of 192 people (31 December 2025).

=== Ethnicity ===
Census 2021 (1+ %)
Ethnicity	Number	Fraction
Slovak	192	98.96%
Not found out	3	1.54%
Total	194	

In year 2021 was 194 people by ethnicity 192 as Slovak, 3 as Not found out, 1 as Serbian, 1 as Rusyn, 1 as Austrian and 1 as German.

Note on population: The difference values of population numbers in the table "Population statistic" and in the sections "Ethnicity" & "Religion" is caused by the use of various statistical methods.

=== Religion ===
Census 2021 (1+ %)
Religion	Number	Fraction
Roman Catholic Church	151	77.84%
None	35	18.04%
Evangelical Church	3	1.55%
Not found out	2	1.03%
Total	194	

In year 2021 was 194 people by religion 151 from Roman Catholic Church, 35 from None, 3 from Evangelical Church, 2 from Not found out, 1 from Calvinist Church, 1 from Greek Catholic Church and 1 from Ad hoc movements.

== Genealogical resources ==
The records for genealogical research are available at the state archive "Statny Archiv in Bratislava, Slovakia"

- Roman Catholic church records (births/marriages/deaths): 1660-1896 (parish B)

== See also ==
- List of municipalities and towns in Slovakia
