= Daniella Kallmeyer =

South African fashion designer

Daniella Kallmeyer is a South African fashion designer. She is the founder of the label KALLMEYER, which she launched in 2012. It is based in New York City.
