= VTV Vaša Televízia =

Defunct Slovak television channel

VTV was one of the first Slovak private TV channels. It started broadcasting on 22 April 1995 via the Eutelsat 2F2 satellite (position 10° East) in analogue, free-to-air form. Its opening night featured the film Knight Moves; entertainment made up a substantial amount of its output, mostly local production, as well as news bulletins.

The amount of in-house programming started to decrease due to its constant changes of administration, which also led to a shortfall of money available to sustain. The channel's line-up started to be filled by a variety of B movies and was still sustained by its independent news operation, one of the few in Slovakia at the time. It also had the rights to football matches. Throughout its entire existence, it aired Teenage, which was a launch pad for later Slovak TV celebrities.

In 1998, faced by the appearance of Markíza, VTV received an increase in its budget and in September got a new schedule, made up largely of feature films and German TV series. When the package of new titles reached its end, including repeats, the channel continued in its usual position. The appearance of Luna Television in November 1999 was also one of the factors that accelerated its demise.

Since the overwhelming majority of Slovak satellite receivers were fixed on the Astra satellite at 19.2° east, VTV failed to get enough viewers and ended with bankruptcy in January 2000. Its license was withdrawn on 9 February 2000.
