= Miss Guatemala 2011 =

- Date: November 25, 2011
- Venue: Centro de Convenciones Ilumina, Guatemala City, Guatemala
- Broadcaster: Guatevisión
- Entrants: 18
- Winner: Laura Beatriz Godoy Calle; Ciudad Capital

The Miss Guatemala 2011 pageant was held on November 25, 2011 at Centro de Convenciones Ilumina in the capital city Guatemala City, Guatemala. This year only 18 candidates were competing for the national crown. The chosen winner will represent Guatemala at the Miss Universe 2012 and at Miss Continente Americano 2012. The winner of best national costume, the costume will be used in Miss Universe 2012. Miss World Guatemala will represent Guatemala at the Miss World 2012. Miss Guatemala Internacional will represent Guatemala at the Miss International 2012. The First Runner-Up will enter Miss Intercontinental 2012 and the Second Runner-Up will enter Top Model of the World 2012. The Top 10 Semifinalists entered Reina Internacional del Café 2012, Reina Hispanoamericana 2012, Reina Mundial del Banano 2012, Miss Globe International 2012, and Miss Tourism International 2012.

== Final results ==
Final results	Contestant
Miss Guatemala 2011	Ciudad Capital – Laura Godoy
Miss World Guatemala 2011	Quetzaltenango – Monique Aparicio
Miss Guatemala Internacional 2011	Departamento Guatemala – Christa García
First Runner-Up	Sacatepéquez – Alessandra Manzur
Second Runner-Up	(United States) USA Guatemala – Sara Whipple
Semifinalists	Izabal – Lisa Francisca; Chimaltenango – Andrea Morales; Jalapa – Sindy Buezo; Chiquimula – Albertina Sandoval; Baja Verapaz – Gloria Ortíz

=== Special awards ===
- Miss Photogenic – Andrea Morales (Chimaltenango)
- Miss Congeniality (voted by the candidates) – Yasmina Pacay (Alta Verapaz)
- Best National Costume – Stephanie Ramírez (Huehuetenango)

=== Final Competition Scores ===
Representing	Evening Gown	Swimsuit	Average	Question
Ciudad Capital	9.10	9.05	9.08	9.25
Quetzaltenango	9.20	9.20	9.20	9.15
Guatemala	8.70	8.85	8.78	8.95
Sacatepéquez	8.50	8.90	8.70	8.90
USA Guatemala	8.90	9.35	9.13	8.75
Izabal	9.05	8.30	8.68	
Chimaltenango	8.60	8.60	8.60	
Jalapa	8.25	8.65	8.45	
Chiquimula	7.30	9.05	8.18	
Baja Verapaz	8.00	7.85	7.93	

Winner
Miss World Guatemala
Miss Guatemala Internacional
First Runner-Up
Second Runner-Up
Top 10 Semifinalists

== Official Delegates ==
Represent	Contestant	Age	Height	Hometown
Alta Verapaz	Yasmina Noemí Pacay García	26	1.75 m (5 ft 9 in)	Cobán
Baja Verapaz	Gloria Ortíz Jiménez	20	1.72 m (5 ft 7 1/2 in)	Ciudad Guatemala
Chimaltenango	Andrea Alejandra Morales Teo	18	1.71 m (5 ft 7 1/2 in)	Chimaltenango
Chiquimula	María Albertina Sandoval Espinoza	21	1.80 m (5 ft 11 in)	Ipala
Ciudad Capital	Laura Beatriz Godoy Calle	23	1.76 m (5 ft 9 1/2 in)	Ciudad Guatemala
Departamento Guatemala	Christa García de Fernández	19	1.70 m (5 ft 7 in)	Ciudad Guatemala
Escuintla	Dayana Bolaños Oroperda	22	1.73 m (5 ft 8 in)	Escuintla
Huehuetenango	Stephanie Melissa Ramírez García	22	1.74 m (5 ft 8 1/2 in)	Huehuetenango
Izabal	Lisa Hayet Francisca Castillo	18	1.83 m (6 ft 0 in)	Mixco
Jalapa	Sindy Mabel Buezo Recinos	22	1.70 m (5 ft 7 in)	Jalapa
Petén	Xiomara Trujillo de los Oros	25	1.71 m (5 ft 7 1/2 in)	Flores
Progreso	Blanca Stefany Lara Ojeda	21	1.72 m (5 ft 7 1/2 in)	Ciudad Guatemala
Quetzaltenango	Monique Aparicio López	21	1.81 m (5 ft 11 1/2 in)	Quetzaltenango
Quiché	Astrid Karina Perdomo Mora	22	1.77 m (5 ft 9 1/2 in)	Ciudad Guatemala
Sacatepéquez	Alessandra Manzur Franco	23	1.84 m (6 ft 1/2 in)	Villa Nueva
Suchitepéquez	Huceedly Cortez Charchal	24	1.7 m (5 ft 7 in)	Mixco
(United States) USA Guatemala	Sara Whipple García-Manzo	21	1.78 m (5 ft 10 in)	Miami
Zacapa	Flor de María Figueroa Linares	20	1.78 m (5 ft 10 in)	Villa Nueva
