= Channa Divouvi =

Gabonese beauty pageant titleholder

- Born: Channa Divouvi; June 27, 1991 (age 35); Ngounie, Gabon
- Height: 1.77 m (5 ft 9 1/2 in)
- Beauty pageant titleholder
- Title: Miss Gabon 2012 1st runner-up
- Hair color: Black
- Major competitions: Miss Gabon 2012 (1st runner-up); Miss International 2012; Miss Universe 2012

Channa Divouvi is a Gabonese beauty pageant titleholder who was crowned Winner Miss Gabon 2012 1st runner-up and she was represented Gabon at Miss International 2012 and Miss Universe 2012. After She designated as Miss Universe Gabon 2012.

== Biography ==
Channa has worked at Libreville International Airport and she took education at Lycée National Leon Mba.

== Miss Gabon 2011 ==
Marie Noelle Ada is the first ever representative in Miss Universe beauty pageant in 2012. Channa was 1st runner-up Miss Gabon 2012.

== Designations ==
Channa was appointed as Miss Universe Gabon, since Marie-Noëlle Ada withdrew as Gabon representative at the Miss Universe 2012 due to Marie being unable to attend both the pageant and Miss Gabon 2012.

== Miss International 2012 ==
Channa represented Gabon at Miss International 2012 in Okinawa, Japan.

== Miss Universe 2012 ==
Gabon is Located in western Africa, it was a French colony until 1960. About 1.5 million people live in the country. 27 beauties of the 9 provinces participated in the Miss Gabon 2012 beauty pageant.

Awards and achievements
Preceded by Marie-Noëlle Ada	Miss Gabon; 2012	Succeeded by Jennifer Ondo
