= Miss Universe Saint Lucia =

National beauty pageant competition in Saint Lucia

Miss Saint Lucia Organization
- Formation: 1975; 51 years ago
- Type: Beauty pageant
- Headquarters: Castries
- Location: Saint Lucia
- Members: Miss Universe
- Official languages: English
- President: Joycie Mederick
- Website: misssaintlucia.org

The Miss Saint Lucia or Miss Saint Lucia Universe is a national Beauty pageant in Saint Lucia where the winner is sent to Miss Universe. Miss Saint Lucia 2023 is Earlyca Frederick of Choiseul, who represented Saint Lucia at Miss Universe 2023 in El Salvador on November 18, 2023.

Saffron Gilbert-Kaluba, an entrepreneur named in the Forbes 30 under 30, was among the delegates in the Miss Universe Saint Lucia 2025 edition.

== History ==
Saint Lucia owned national winner in 1975 when Sophia St. Omer crowned as the first Miss Saint Lucia winner in history. Under the Ministry of Tourism Saint Lucia, in 1977 the Miss Saint Lucia Organization sent the winner to Miss Universe 1977.

The Miss Saint Lucia Organization deeply holds empowerment programs during years:

- Student Experiences and Mentorship Programs
- Little Sista's Programme

== Franchise ownership ==
- Ministry of Tourism Saint Lucia (1977 & 2011–2014)
- Joan Johnson (Joan Laurencin) (2006–2007)
- Joycie Mederick (Cinnamon Productions) (2017–present)

== Titleholders ==
The following is a list of all Miss Saint Lucia titleholders since 1975:

Year	Miss Saint Lucia	Quarter	Runner-up
1975	Sophia St. Omer	Castries	No Award
1977	Iva Mendes	Castries	No Award
1993	Carnita Cernac	Soufriere	No Award
1994	Yasmine Walcott	Castries	No Award
2006	Sascha-Andrew Rose	Castries	No Award
2007	Yoanna Henry	Castries	No Award
2011	Joy-Ann Biscette	Castries	No Award
2012	Tara Marty Carla Edward	Gros Islet	Oneka McKoy
2014	Roxanne Didier Nicholas	Castries	Louise Victor
2017	Louise Victor	Micoud	Ena Julien
2018	Angella Dalsou	Castries	Kesie Favrier
2019	Bebiana Mangal	Castries	Lisa Marie Austin
2022	Sheris Paul	Castries	Kimani Thomas
2023	Earlyca Frederick	Choiseul	Kaysia Verneuil-Joyeux; Natanni Kya St. Omer
2024	Skye Faucher	Castries	Jannae Leon
2025	Shianne Smith	Micoud	
2026	Bernella Velinor	TBA	

== Titleholders under Miss Saint Lucia org. ==
=== Miss Universe Saint Lucia ===
- : Declared as Winner
- : Ended as runner-up or top 5/6 qualification
- : Ended as one of the finalists or semi-finalists
- : Ended as special awards winner

Miss Saint Lucia has started to send a Miss Saint Lucia to Miss Universe from 1977. On occasion, when the winner does not qualify (due to age) for either contest, a runner-up is sent.

Year	Quarter	Miss Saint Lucia	Placement at Miss Universe	Special Award(s)	Notes
2026	Dennery	Bernella Velinor	TBA	TBA	
2025	Micoud	Shianne Smith	Unplaced		
2024	Castries	Skye Faucher	Unplaced		
2023	Choiseul	Earlyca Frederick	Unplaced		
2022	Castries	Sheris Paul	Unplaced		
Due to the impact of COVID-19 pandemic, no representative between 2020—2021
2019	Castries	Bebiana Mangal	Unplaced		
2018	Castries	Angella Elvina Dalsou	Unplaced		
2017	Micoud	Louise Liza Victor	Unplaced		Joycie Mederick (Cinnamon Productions) directorship.
Did not compete between 2015—2016
2014	Castries	Roxanne Didier Nicholas	Unplaced		
2013	Did not compete				
2012	Gros Islet	Tara Marty Carla Edward	Unplaced		
2011	Castries	Joy-Ann Biscette	Unplaced		In 2011 competed in official Miss Saint Lucia under director and Ministry of Tourism Saint Lucia.
Did not compete between 2008—2010
2007	Castries	Yoanna Henry	Unplaced		
2006	Castries	Sascha Gianne Michaele Andrew-Rose	Unplaced		Joan Johnson (Joan Laurencin) directorship — Miss Universe Saint Lucia ― crowned twice by different organization; in 2004 she was handpicked by casting while in 2006 she is officially crowned as Miss Saint Lucia 2006.
Did not compete between 1978—2005
1977	Castries	Iva Lua Mendes	Unplaced		Ministry of Tourism, Saint Lucia (Carnival) — Support.
