= Miss Universe 2012 =

61st edition of the beauty pageant

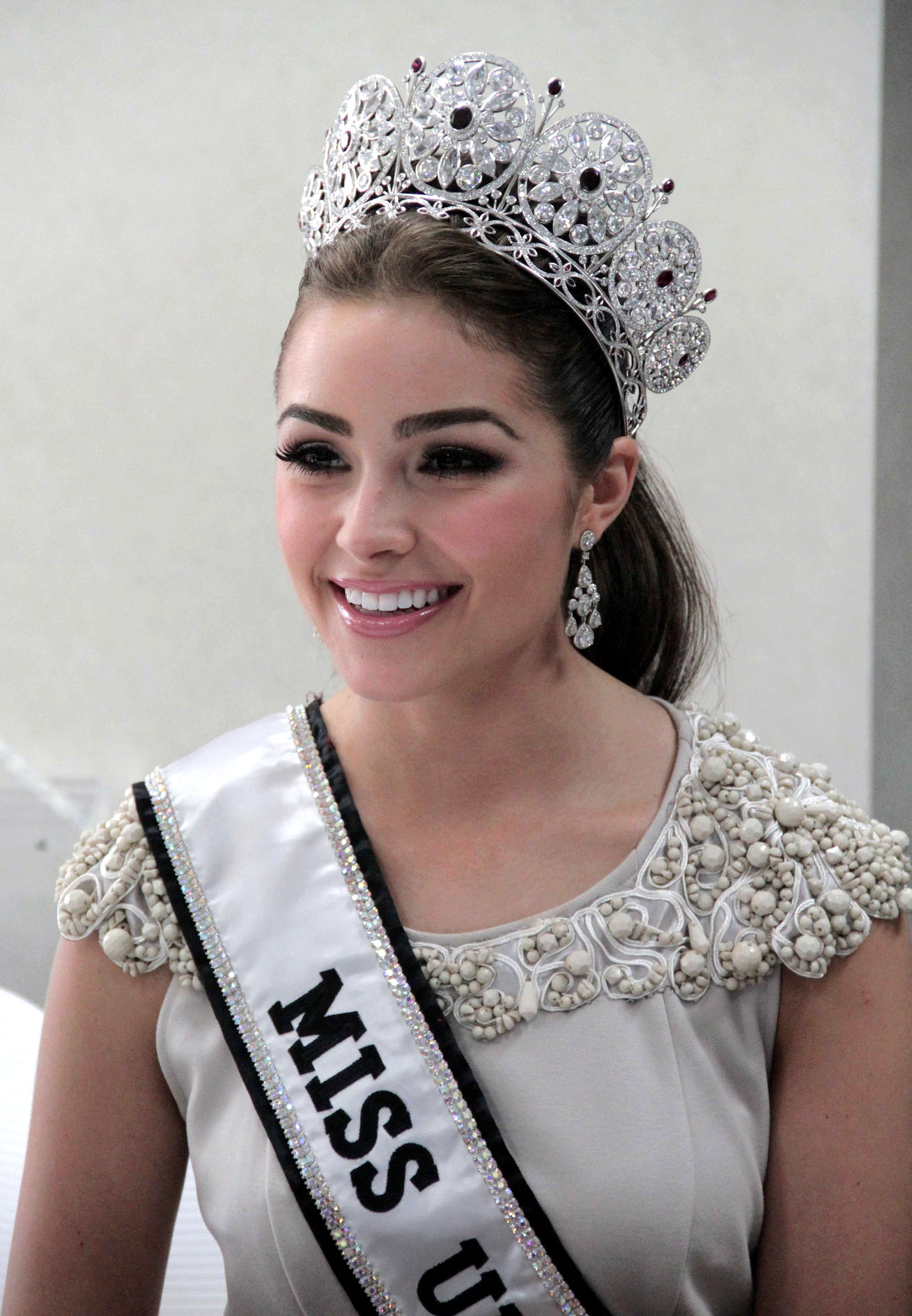
- Olivia Culpo
- Date: December 19, 2012
- Presenters: Andy Cohen; Giuliana Rancic; Jeannie Mai; Shamcey Supsup
- Entertainment: Train; Timomatic
- Venue: PH Live, Planet Hollywood Resort and Casino, Las Vegas, Nevada, United States
- Broadcaster: NBC (KSNV-DT); Telemundo (KBLR)
- Entrants: 89
- Placements: 16
- Debuts: Gabon; Lithuania
- Withdrawals: Egypt; Kazakhstan; Portugal; Slovenia; Turks and Caicos Islands; United States Virgin Islands
- Returns: Bulgaria; Ethiopia; Namibia; Norway
- Winner: Olivia Culpo; United States
- Congeniality: Laura Godoy, Guatemala
- Best National Costume: Xu Jidan, China
- Photogenic: Diana Avdiu, Kosovo

Miss Universe 2012 was the 61st Miss Universe pageant, held at the PH Live at Planet Hollywood Resort & Casino in Las Vegas, Nevada, United States, on December 19, 2012.

At the conclusion of the event, the pageant was won by Olivia Culpo of the United States, who was crowned by Leila Lopes of Angola. It was the United States' first win in fifteen years, and its eighth win at the pageant.

There were contestants from eighty-nine countries and territories, three more than the previous year. It was hosted by Andy Cohen and Giuliana Rancic, with Jeannie Mai as backstage correspondent. American rock band Train and Australian musician Tim Omaji performed in this year's pageant.

== Background ==
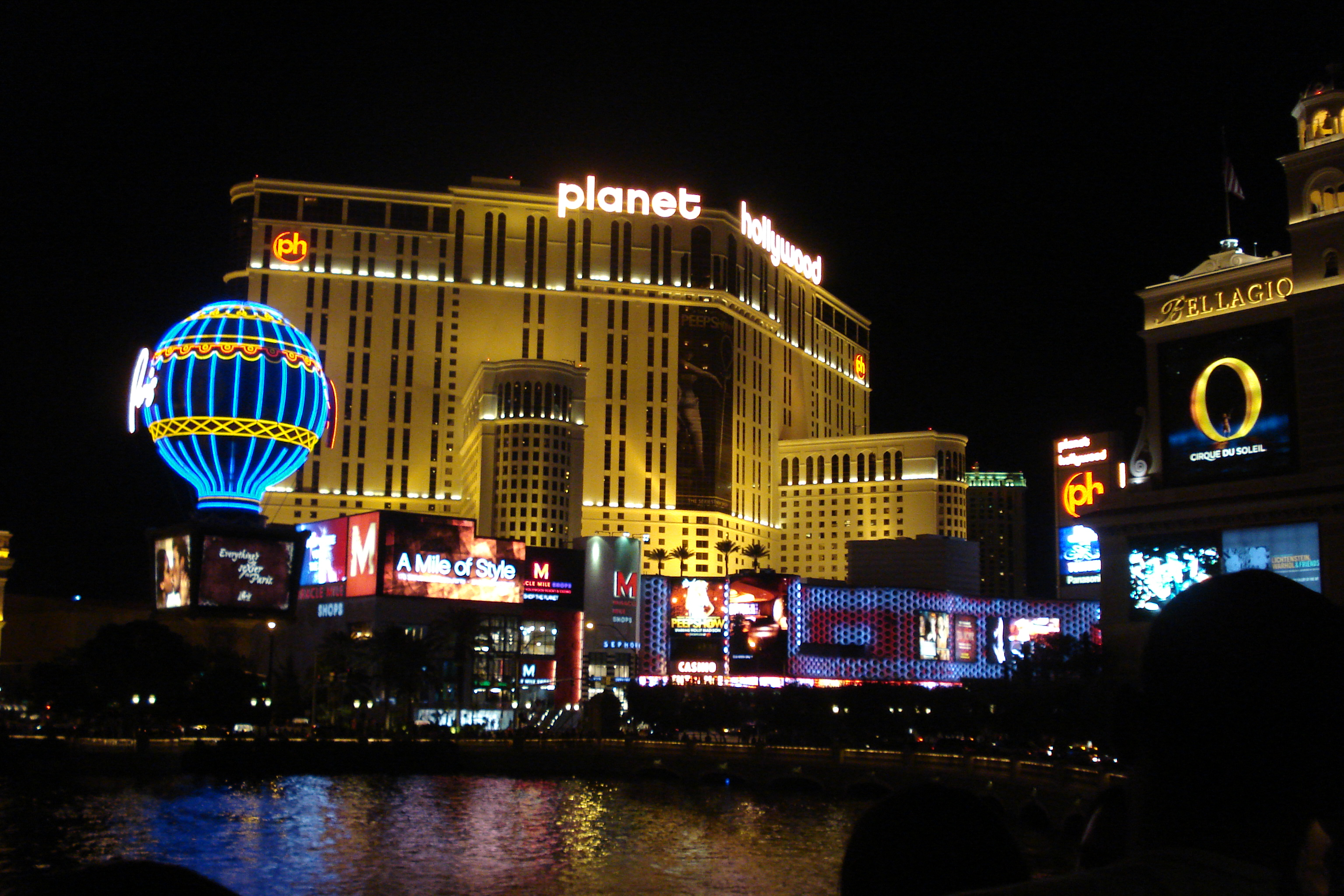
Planet Hollywood Resort and Casino, the venue

=== Location and date ===
In March 2012, the Miss Universe Organization announced that the pageant was postponed to mid-December as broadcaster, NBC, was unable to broadcast the pageant at the same time as the 2012 Summer Olympics and the 2012 United States presidential election. In April 2012, it was announced that Bangladesh would host the pageant on December 13, 2012. However, in July, the Bangladeshi president announced that they would not host the pageant because of financial constraints.

In August 2012, the Dominican government received a proposal from the Miss Universe Organization to host the competition on December 11, 2012. The Dominican Republic had previously hosted Miss Universe 1977 in Santo Domingo. The organization was considering hosting the final night at the Hard Rock Resort and Casino in Punta Cana. However, the government said that the country was not able to provide any kind of financial assistance to the pageant, and so was not granted the hosting rights.

The organization moved the pageant to Las Vegas, Nevada in December changing from the customary mid-year scheduling. On September 27, 2012, the organization confirmed that the 2012 pageant would be held at the Planet Hollywood Resort & Casino in Las Vegas, Nevada, on December 19, 2012.

=== Selection of participants ===
Contestants from eighty-nine countries and territories were selected to compete in the competition. Seven of these were appointed to their positions after being a runner-up of their national pageant or were selected through a casting process, while nine were selected to replace the original winners.

Adwoa Yamoah, the first runner-up of Miss Universe Canada 2012, was appointed to represent Canada after Sahar Biniaz, Miss Universe Canada 2012, withdrew for personal reasons. Ioánna Yiannakoú, the runner-up of Star Cyprus 2012, was appointed to represent Cyprus after Ntaniella Kefala, Star Cyprus 2012, withdrew for undisclosed reasons. Carola Durán, Miss Dominican Republic 2012, was to compete, but was dethroned after it was discovered that she was previously married and is divorced. She was replaced by, Dulcita Lieggi, the first runner-up. Natalie Korneitsik, the first runner-up of Miss Estonia 2012, was appointed to represent Estonia after the winner Kätlin Valdmets, withdrew due to lack of sponsorship. Marie Payet, the second runner-up of Miss France 2012, was appointed to represent France due to a potential date conflict between Miss Universe 2012 and Miss France 2013, at which Delphine Wespiser, Miss France 2012, was contractually obligated to be present.

Channa Divouvi, the first runner-up of Miss Gabon 2012, was appointed to represent Gabon due to a potential date conflict between Miss Universe 2012 and Miss Gabon 2013, at which winner Marie-Noëlle Ada, was contractually obligated to be present. Shilpa Singh, the first runner-up of I Am She 2012, was appointed to represent India after Urvashi Rautela, Miss Universe India 2012, withdrew due as she was underage and also the reigning Miss Tourism Queen of the Year International at that time. Avianca Böhm, Miss Universe New Zealand 2012, was replaced by her first runner-up, Talia Bennett, due to citizenship issues. Isabella Ayuk, Most Beautiful Girl in Nigeria 2012, switched pageants with Damiete Charles Granville, Most Beautiful Girl in Nigeria Universe 2012, due to being overage at Miss World.

Andrea Huisgen, Miss Spain 2011, was unable to participate as the Miss Spain organization was bankrupt, and the license was awarded to a new organization called Miss Universe Spain. Although the rights had changed, Huisgen was allowed to compete having changed contracts.

This contest saw the debuts of Gabon and Lithuania, and the returns of Bulgaria, Ethiopia, Namibia, and Norway. Bulgaria, Ethiopia, and Namibia last competed in Miss Universe 2009, while Norway last competed in Miss Universe 2010. Egypt, Kazakhstan, Portugal, Slovenia, Turks and Caicos Islands, and the United States Virgin Islands withdrew. Aĭnur Tolyeuova of Kazakhstan withdrew as she was underage. Egypt, Portugal, Slovenia, Turks and Caicos, and the U.S. Virgin Islands withdrew after their respective organizations failed to hold a national competition or appoint a delegate.

==== Transgender women allowed to compete ====
Beginning with Miss Universe 2013, the Miss Universe Organization allowed transgender women to compete, following the consultation with the GLAAD Organization. The changes in the rules came after Jenna Talackova, a transgender woman competing at Miss Universe Canada 2012, was reinstated, having been removed from the pageant. Her removal was because she "did not meet the requirements to compete". A month after her removal, the organization allowed Talackova to compete provided that "she meets the legal gender recognition requirements of Canada, and the standards established by other international competitions." Talackova reached the top 12, and was one of the four contestants to win the Miss Congeniality award.

Six years after the pageant rules were changed, Ángela Ponce of Spain made history at Miss Universe 2018 as the first transgender contestant to compete at Miss Universe.

== Results ==
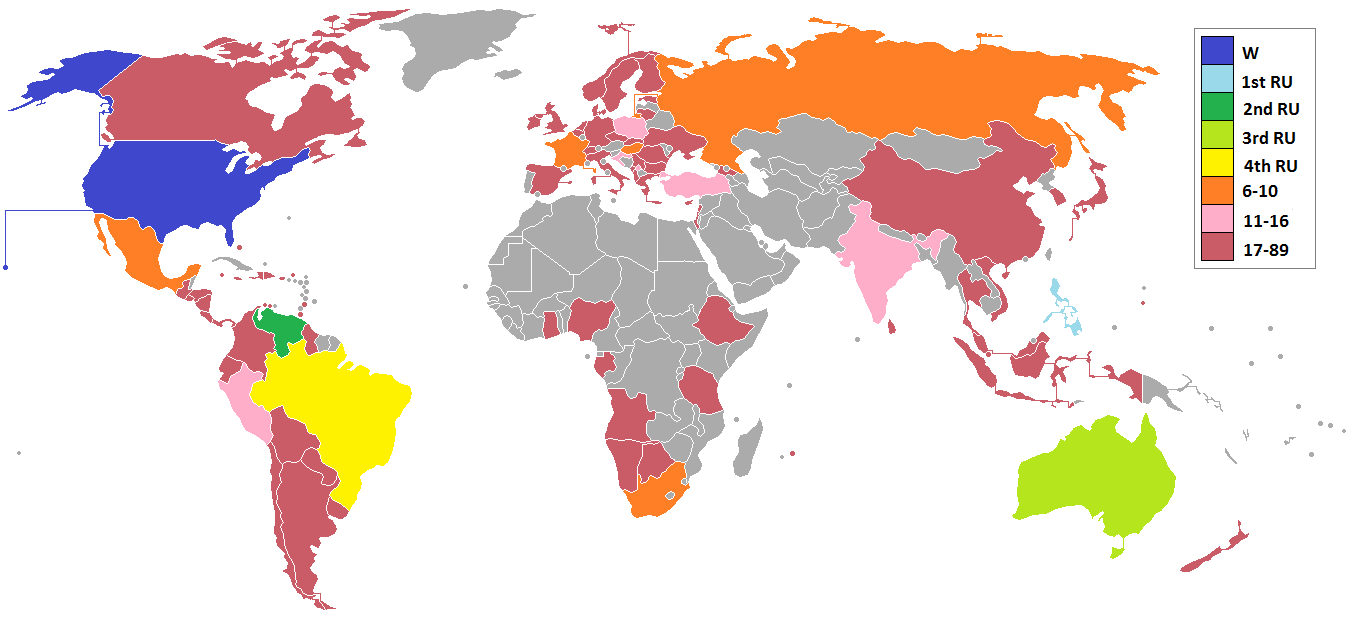
Participating countries and territories

=== Placements ===
Placement	Contestant
Miss Universe 2012	United States – Olivia Culpo
1st Runner-Up	Philippines – Janine Tugonon
2nd Runner-Up	Venezuela – Irene Esser
3rd Runner-Up	Australia – Renae Ayris
4th Runner-Up	Brazil – Gabriela Markus
Top 10	France – Marie Payet; Hungary – Ágnes Konkoly; Mexico – Karina González; Russia – Elizaveta Golovanova; South Africa – Melinda Bam
Top 16	Croatia – Elizabeta Burg; India – Shilpa Singh; Kosovo – Diana Avdiu; Peru – Nicole Faveron; Poland – Marcelina Zawadzka; Turkey – Çağıl Özkul

=== Special awards ===
Award	Contestant
Miss Congeniality	Guatemala – Laura Godoy
Miss Photogenic	Kosovo – Diana Avdiu

==== Best National Costume ====
Placement	Contestant
Winner	China – Xu Jidan
1st runner-up	Mexico – Karina González
2nd runner-up	Netherlands – Nathalie den Dekker
3rd runner-up	Sri Lanka – Sabrina Herft
4th runner-up	Brazil – Gabriela Markus
Top 10	British Virgin Islands – Abigail Hyndman; Nicaragua – Farah Eslaquit; Indonesia – Maria Selena; Panama – Stephanie Vander Werf; Peru – Nicole Faverón

== Pageant ==
=== Format ===
As with Miss Universe 2011, fifteen semifinalists were chosen through the preliminary competition, that was composed of the swimsuit and evening gown competitions, and closed-door interviews. Internet voting was still being implemented, with fans being able to vote for another delegate to advance into the semifinals, making the number of semifinalists sixteen. The winner of the fan vote was not revealed during the final telecast. The sixteen semifinalists competed in the swimsuit competition, narrowing them down to ten. The ten then competed in the evening gown competition, and were narrowed down to five. The five finalists competed in the question and answer round and the final look.

=== Selection committee ===
==== Preliminary competition ====
- Carlos Anaya – Host for My Lifestyle Extra
- Beverly Frank – Executive Vice-president for Business Affairs for 19 Entertainment
- Duane Gazi – International scout with the Trump Model Management
- Michael Greenwald – Vice-President of Talent at Don Buchwald & Associates
- Jimmy Nguyen – Entertainment and new media lawyer
- Corinne Nicolas – President of the Trump Model Management
- Amy Sadowsky – Senior Vice-President of Public Relations for Planet Holywood International
- Crystle Stewart – Miss USA 2008 from Texas

==== Final telecast ====
- Nigel Barker – Fashion photographer and the host of The Face
- Diego Boneta – Singer, actor and songwriter from Mexico
- Scott Disick – Businessman, entrepreneur and reality star of Keeping Up With the Kardashians
- Brad Goreski – Fashion stylist and reality star of It's a Brad, Brad World
- Masaharu Morimoto – Chef and star of Iron Chef and Iron Chef America from Japan
- Ximena Navarrete – Miss Universe 2010 from Mexico
- Pablo Sandoval – Professional baseball player from Venezuela
- Lisa Vanderpump – Reality star of The Real Housewives of Beverly Hills
- Kerri Walsh Jennings – Professional beach volleyball player and triple gold medalist in Summer Olympics

== Contestants ==
Eighty-nine contestants competed for the title.

Country/Territory	Contestant	Age (Note: Ages at the time of the pageant)	Hometown
Albania	Adrola Dushi	19	Rrëshen
Angola	Marcelina Vahekeni	22	Ondjiva
Argentina	Camila Solórzano	23	Tucumán
Aruba	Liza Helder	23	Oranjestad
Australia	Renae Ayris	22	Perth
Bahamas	Celeste Marshall	20	Nassau
Belgium	Laura Beyne	20	Brussels
Bolivia	Yéssica Mouton	24	Santa Cruz
Botswana	Sheillah Molelekwa	19	Gaborone
Brazil	Gabriela Markus	24	Teutônia
British Virgin Islands	Abigail Hyndman	22	Road Town
Bulgaria	Zhana Yaneva	23	Sofia
Canada	Adwoa Yamoah	26	Calgary
Cayman Islands	Lindsay Japal	24	Georgetown
Chile	Ana Luisa König	22	Santiago
China	Xu Jidan	22	Shanghai
Colombia	Daniella Álvarez	24	Barranquilla
Costa Rica	Nazareth Cascante	22	Alajuela
Croatia	Elizabeta Burg	19	Vrbanja
Curaçao	Monifa Jansen	19	Willemstad
Cyprus	Ioanna Yiannakou	19	Paphos
Czech Republic	Tereza Chlebovská	22	Krnov
Denmark	Josefine Hewitt	19	Esbjerg
Dominican Republic	Dulcita Lieggi	23	Santo Domingo
Ecuador	Carolina Aguirre	19	Guayaquil
El Salvador	Ana Yancy Clavel	20	San Salvador
Estonia	Natalie Korneitsik	23	Tallinn
Ethiopia	Helen Getachew	22	Addis Ababa
Finland	Sara Chafak	22	Helsinki
France	Marie Payet	20	Saint-Denis
Gabon	Channa Divouvi	21	Ngounié
Georgia	Tamar Shedania	20	Zugdidi
Germany	Alicia Endemann	23	Hamburg
Ghana	Gifty Ofori	24	Accra
Great Britain	Holly Hale	22	Llanelli
Greece	Vasiliki Tsirogianni	24	Thessaloniki
Guam	Alyssa Cruz Aguero	24	Barrigada
Guatemala	Laura Godoy	24	Guatemala City
Guyana	Ruqayyah Boyer	22	Georgetown
Haiti	Christela Jacques	19	Pétion-Ville
Honduras	Jennifer Andrade	24	Tegucigalpa
Hungary	Ágnes Konkoly	25	Budapest
India	Shilpa Singh	23	Samastipur
Indonesia	Maria Selena	22	Semarang
Ireland	Adrienne Murphy	22	Dublin
Israel	Lina Makhuli	19	Haifa
Italy	Grazia Pinto	24	Catania
Jamaica	Chantal Zaky	24	Port Antonio
Japan	Ayako Hara	24	Sendai
Kosovo	Diana Avdiu	19	Mitrovica
Lebanon	Rina Chibany	21	Zahle
Lithuania	Greta Mikalauskytė	19	Šiauliai
Malaysia	Kimberley Leggett	19	Penang
Mauritius	Ameeksha Dilchand	26	Curepipe
Mexico	Karina González	21	Aguascalientes
Montenegro	Andrea Radonjić	20	Podgorica
Namibia	Tsakana Nkandih	22	Windhoek
Netherlands	Nathalie den Dekker	22	Amstelveen
New Zealand	Talia Bennett	26	Auckland
Nicaragua	Farah Eslaquit	21	La Concepción
Nigeria	Isabella Ayuk	26	Ikom
Norway	Sara Nicole Andersen	20	Oslo
Panama	Stephanie Vander Werf	26	Panama City
Paraguay	Egni Eckert	25	Luque
Peru	Nicole Faverón	24	Iquitos
Philippines	Janine Tugonon	23	Balanga
Poland	Marcelina Zawadzka	23	Malbork
Puerto Rico	Bodine Koehler	20	San Juan
Romania	Delia Duca	26	Brașov
Russia	Elizabeth Golovanova	19	Smolensk
Saint Lucia	Tara Edward	25	Gros Islet
Serbia	Branislava Mandić	21	Čurug
Singapore	Lynn Tan	24	Singapore
Slovakia	Ľubica Štepanová	24	Prievidza
South Africa	Melinda Bam	23	Pretoria
South Korea	Lee Sung-hye	24	Seoul
Spain	Andrea Huisgen	22	Barcelona
Sri Lanka	Sabrina Herft	25	Colombo
Sweden	Hanni Beronius	22	Gothenburg
Switzerland	Alina Buchschacher	21	Bern
Tanzania	Winfrida Dominic	19	Dar es Salaam
Thailand	Farida Waller	19	Krabi
Trinidad and Tobago	Avionne Mark	23	Champ Fleurs
Turkey	Çağıl Özge Özkul	24	Ankara
Ukraine	Anastasia Chernova	19	Kharkiv
United States	Olivia Culpo	20	Cranston
Uruguay	Camila Vezzoso	19	Artigas
Venezuela	Irene Esser	21	Río Caribe
Vietnam	Lưu Thị Diễm Hương	22	Ho Chi Minh City
