= Jennifer Ondo =

Gabonese beauty pageant titleholder (born 1992)

Jennifer Ondo Mouchita
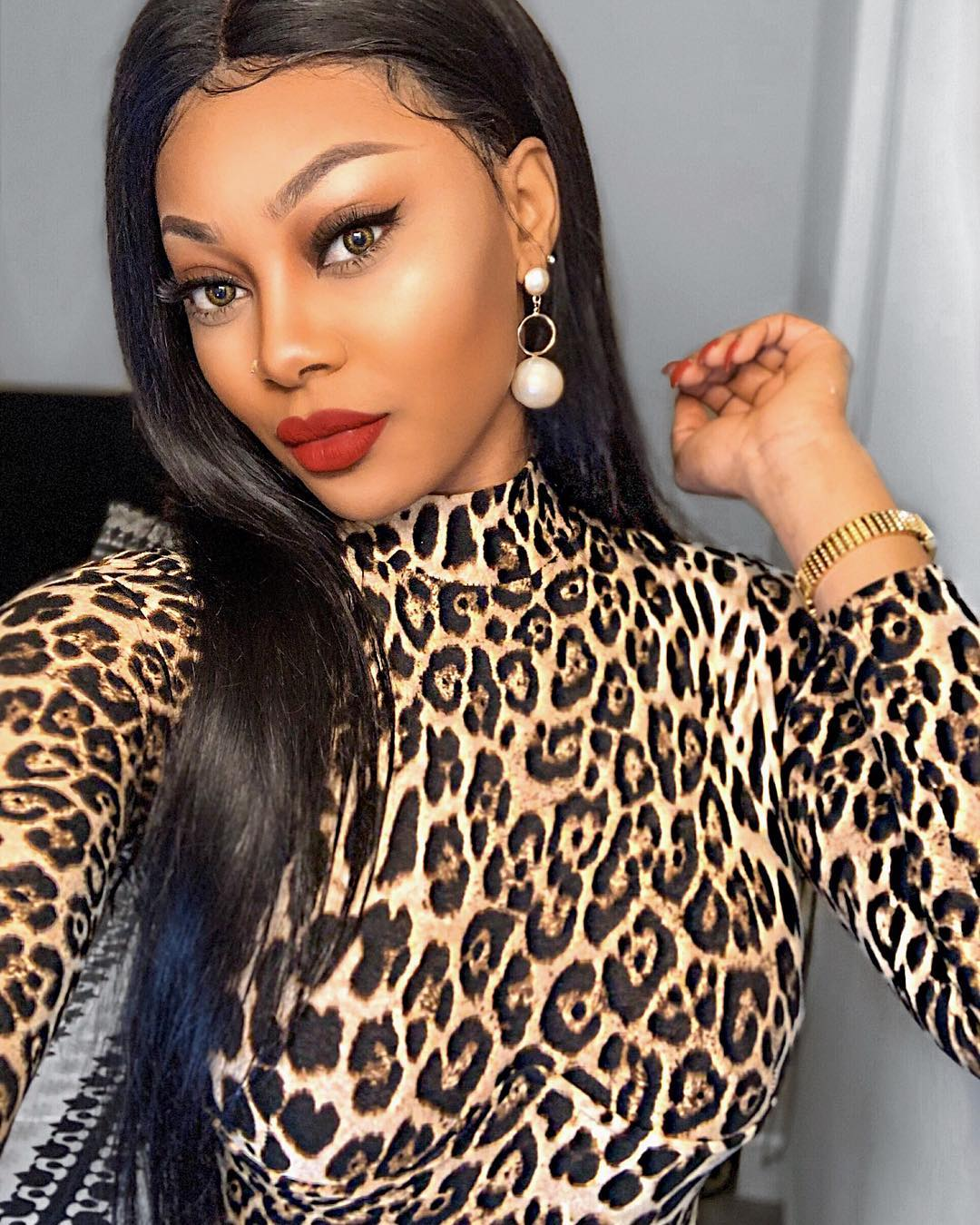
- Jennifer Ondo at Glendale in 2019
- Born: Ruth Jennifer Ondo Mouchita; November 2, 1992 (age 33); Haut-Ogooué Province, Gabon
- Other name: Jennifer Ondo
- Height: 1.8 m (5 ft 11 in)
- Beauty pageant titleholder
- Title: Miss Gabon 2013
- Hair color: Black
- Eye color: Brown
- Major competitions: Miss Gabon 2013 (Winner); Miss Universe 2013

Ruth Jennifer Ondo Mouchita (born 1992) is a Gabonese model and beauty pageant titleholder. She was crowned Miss Gabon 2013 and served as the representative of Gabon in Miss Universe 2013.

== Miss Gabon 2013 ==
Jennifer Ondo Mouchita was the representative of the Haut-Ogooué province. She has been crowned Miss Gabon 2013 by Miss Gabon 2012 Marie-Noëlle Ada during a festive gala at the finals of the most beautiful woman of Gabon. It was held in December 22. 2013 at the "City of Democracy" in Libreville.

== Miss Universe 2013 ==
Jennifer Ondo from Libreville represented the country at the 2013 Miss Universe pageant at the Crocus City Hall in Moscow, Russia on November 9 after she was named Most Beautiful Women of Gabon. However, she did not make it to the top 15.

Awards and achievements
Preceded by Marie-Noëlle Ada	Miss Gabon; 2013	Succeeded by Magalie Nguema
