= Sabaton (disambiguation) =

Sabaton is a knight's foot armour.

Sabaton may also refer to:

- Sabaton (band), Swedish power metal band
- Sabaton, El Salvador TV program with Maria Luisa Vicuña
