= Jeanne Manomba-Kombila =

Gabonese politician

Jeanne Manomba-Kombila is a Gabonese politician.

Manomba-Kombila was the first female government minister for Gabon.
