= Miss Gabon =

Beauty contest

Miss Gabon Organization
- Formation: 2001
- Purpose: Beauty pageant
- Headquarters: Libreville
- Location: Gabon
- Official language: French
- Committee: Défis de femmes
- Affiliations: Miss Universe; Miss World; Miss International; Miss Earth; Miss Supranational; Miss Tourism World
- Website: www.defisdefemmes.com

Miss Gabon is a national beauty pageant in Gabon. The pageant was established in 2001 by Défis de femmes.

== National franchises ==
Miss Gabon has become official national franchise of Miss Universe in Libreville since 2012. The winner automatically declares as Miss Universe Gabon and represent Gabon at the Miss Universe pageant. On occasion, when the winner does not qualify (due to age) for either contest, a runner-up is sent. The Miss Gabon is also selecting the titleholders to participate in the other Big Four international beauty pageants such as Miss World, Miss International, Miss Earth and other minor international pageants such as Miss Tourism World and Miss Supranational.

== Titleholders ==
The following is a list of winners. From 2009 to 2015.

Year	Miss Gabon	1st Runner-up	2nd Runner-up	3rd Runner-up	4th Runner-up	5th Runner-up
2015	Reine Ngotala (Nyanga)	Anis Christine Pitty Yaya (Haut-Ogooué)	Desy Oyane (Ogooué-Lolo)	Ornella Obone (Woleu-Ntem)	Sindiély Obone (Ogooué-Ivindo)	Adama Oumarou (Woleu-Ntem)
2014	Maggaly Nguema (Estuaire)	Pulchérie Nze Nzoughe (Moyen-Ogooué)	Marilyne Nfono (Woleu-Ntem)	Grace Vanessa Abeng (Estuaire)	Jessie Helda Lekekery (Haut-Ogooué)	Lisa Doriane Ndjaboueni (Nyanga)
2013	Jennifer Ondo (Haut-Ogooué)	Brunilla Moussadingou (Moyen-Ogooué)	Hilary Ondo (Woleu-Ntem)	Filiane Mayombo Nfono (Ogooué-Lolo)	Reily Makaya (Nyanga)	—
2012	Marie-Noëlle Ada (Ngounié)	Channa Divouvi (Ngounie)	Nyangue Boubéya (Ogooué-Lolo)	—	—	—
2009	Marlyne Léa Ayene Ella (Estuaire)	Marie Thérèse Bert (Estuaire)	Cynthia Mobumba (Ngounie)	—	—	—
2008	Aurelia Claire Arombino (Moyen-Ogooué)	Paola Ndong (Woleu-Ntem)	Yasmine Piola Arondo (Ogooué-Maritime)	—	—	—
2007	Queenie M'Owono (Moyen-Ogooué)	—	—	—	—	—
2006	Vannesa Simost (Ogooué-Maritime)	—	—	—	—	—
2005	Cornelia Moukagni (Haut-Ogooué)	—	—	—	—	—
2004	Lynn Sanda (Nyanga)	—	—	—	—	—
2003	Tatiana Ndombi (Ogooué-Maritime)	—	—	—	—	—
2002	Chérie Yoni Tsango (Ogooué-Lolo)	—	—	—	—	—
2001	Aicha Sidi (Woleu-Ntem)	—	—	—	—	—

- Due to lack of schedule time Marie-Noëlle Ada (2012) and Reine Ngotala (2015) did not compete at Miss Universe.
- Hilary Ondo (second runner-up 2013) was the runner-up at Miss Tourism World 2014.
- For the first time, the reigning title Magalie Nguema (2014) represented Gabon at Miss Universe, Miss International and Miss Supranational.

== Big Four pageants representatives ==
=== Miss Universe Gabon ===
- : Declared the Winner
- : Finished as a runner-up or top 5/6 qualification
- : Finished as one of the finalists or semifinalists
- : Finished as a special awards winner

Miss Gabon has become official national franchise of Miss Universe in Libreville since 2012. The winner is automatically declared as Miss Universe Gabon and will represent Gabon at Miss Universe. On occasion, when the winner does not qualify (due to age) for either contest, a runner-up is sent.

Year	Province	Miss Gabon	Placement at Miss Universe	Special Award(s)	Notes
Did not compete since 2016—Present
2015	Woleu-Ntem	Ornella Obone	Unplaced		Designation — The third runner-up took over the title of Miss Universe Gabon 2015 after the main winner, Reine Ngotala allocated to Miss World.
2014	Estuaire	Maggaly Nguema	Unplaced		
2013	Haut-Ogooué Province	Ruth Jennifer Ondo Mouchita	Unplaced		
2012	Ngounie	Channa Divouvi	Unplaced		Designation — The first runner-up took over after the main winner, Marie-Noëlle Ada was allocated to Miss World.

=== Miss World Gabon ===
- : Declared the Winner
- : Finished as a runner-up or top 5/6 qualification
- : Finished as one of the finalists or semifinalists
- : Finished as a special awards winner

The 1st Runner-up of Miss Gabon will crown as Miss World Gabon and compete at Miss World.

Year	Province	Miss World Gabon	Placement at Miss World	Special Award(s)	Notes
Did not compete since 2016—Present
2015	Nyanga	Reine Ngotala	Unplaced		
2014	Moyen-Ogooué	Jessie Mathas Lekery	Unplaced		
2013	Moyen-Ogooué	Brunilla Moussadingou	Unplaced		
2012	Ngounie	Marie-Noëlle Ada Meyo	Unplaced		

=== Miss International Gabon ===
- : Declared as Winner
- : Finished as runner-up or top 5/6 qualification
- : Finished as one of the finalists or semifinalists
- : Finished as special awards winner

The Miss International Gabon is usually designated by top candidates at Miss Gabon (runner-up or sometimes winning contest).

Year	Province	Miss Gabon International	Placement at Miss International	Special Award(s)	Notes
Did not compete since 2015—Present
2014	Estuaire	Maggaly Nguema	Unplaced		
2013	Nyanga	Reilly Makaya	Unplaced		
2012	Ngounie	Channa Divouvi	Unplaced		
Did not compete between 2010—2011
2009	Ngounie	Cynthia Mobumba	Unplaced		

=== Miss Earth Gabon ===
- : Declared as Winner
- : Finished as runner-up or top 5/6 qualification
- : Finished as one of the finalists or semifinalists
- : Finished as special awards winner

The 2nd Runner-up of Miss Gabon will crown as Miss Earth Gabon and compete at Miss Earth.

Year	Province	Miss Earth Gabon	Placement at Miss Earth	Special Award(s)	Notes
Did not compete since 2015—Present
2014	Woleu-Ntem	Hulda Marilyne Ondo	Unplaced		
2013	Ogooué-Lolo	Filiane Mayombo Koundi	Unplaced		
2012	Ogooué-Lolo	Nyangue Boubéya	Did not compete		
Did not compete between 2010—2011
2009	Estuaire	Marlyne Léa Ayene Ella	Unplaced		

=== Miss Supranational Gabon ===
- : Declared the Winner
- : Finished as a runner-up or top 5/6 qualification
- : Finished as one of the finalists or semifinalists
- : Finished as a special awards winner

Year	Province	Miss Gabon Supranational	Placement at Miss Supranational	Special Award(s)	Notes
Did not compete since 2015—Present
2015	Libreville	Sindiely Obone Yade	Unplaced		
2014	Libreville	Maggaly Nguema	2nd Runner-up		
2013	Woleu-Ntem	Hilary Ondo	Top 20	Miss Supranational Africa	
2012	Libreville	Victoire Isla Okayi Koumba	Unplaced		
