= Miss Universe Canada 2003 =

- Date: March 1, 2003
- Venue: Le Casino, Montreal, Quebec
- Broadcaster: Livestream
- Entrants: 22
- Placements: 12
- Winner: Leanne Marie Cecile; Ontario Province

Miss Universe Canada 2003 was the inaugural Miss Universe Canada pageant held on March 1, 2003. The winner represented Canada in the Miss Universe 2003 and was a top 10 semi-finalist.

== Final results ==
Final results	Contestant	Results
Miss Universe Canada 2003	Ontario Province - Leanne Cecile	Top 10
1st Runner-up (Miss International Canada 2003)	Alberta Province - Katarzyna Dziedzic	Unplaced
2nd Runner-up	Northwest Territories - Kathy Smith	
3rd Runner-up	British Columbia Province - Nazanin Afshin Jam	
4th Runner-up	New Brunswick Province - María Carolina García	
5th Runner-up	(Prince Edward Island) Prince Edward Province - Svetlana Olipova	
Top 12	Manitoba Province - Lorry Ann Silver; Nova Scotia Province - Ioanna Kapulzcka; Nunavut Territory - Aimée Kuug; Quebec Province - Brooke Johnston; Saskatchewan Province - Frederica Johnson (Ontario) Southeast Canada - Malgosia Majewska	

=== Special awards ===
Award	Contestant
Miss Congeniality	Manitoba Province - Lorry Ann Silver
Miss Photogenic	(Ontario) Lower Canada - Maddisson Accs

== Official delegates ==
Meet the 22 national delegates competing for the title of Miss Universe Canada 2003:

Represents	Contestant	Age	Height	Hometown
Alberta Province	Katarzyna Dziedzic	21	1.80 m (5 ft 11 in)	Edmonton
British Columbia Province	Nazanin Afshin Jam	24	1.72 m (5 ft 8 in)	Vancouver
British Columbia Province	Micaela Whitworth	18	1.67 m (5 ft 6 in)	Vancouver
British Columbia Province	Brandi Alexander	18	1.72 m (5 ft 8 in)	Vancouver
British Columbia Province	Isobel Agar	24	1.72 m (5 ft 8 in)	Vancouver
British Columbia Province	Claire Robinson	22	1.74 m (5 ft 9 in)	Vancouver
British Columbia Province	Sahar Biniaz	18	1.70 m (5 ft 7 in)	Vancouver
British Columbia Province	Brenda Lindstrom	24	1.69 m (5 ft 7 in)	Vancouver
(Ontario) Central Canada	Ashley Miller	18	1.82 m (6 ft 0 in)	Tecumseh
(Ontario) East Canada	Nafeesa Aktar	19	1.73 m (5 ft 8 in)	Toronto
(Ontario) Lower Canada	Maddisson Accs	23	1.71 m (5 ft 7 in)	Toronto
Manitoba Province	Lorry Ann Silver	20	1.77 m (5 ft 10 in)	Winnipeg
New Brunswick Province	María Carolina García	22	1.73 m (5 ft 8 in)	Fredericton
(Newfoundland and Labrador) Newfoundland & Labrador Province	Louise Souffront	26	1.79 m (5 ft 10 in)	St. John's
(Ontario) North Canada	Cynthia Levpol	20	1.81 m (5 ft 11 in)	Thunder Bay
Northwest Territories	Kathy Smith	18	1.74 m (5 ft 9 in)	Yellowknife
Nova Scotia Province	Ioanna Kapulzcka	24	1.85 m (6 ft 1 in)	Halifax
Nunavut Territory	Aimée Kuug	26	1.81 m (5 ft 11 in)	Iqaluit
Ontario Province	Leanne Marie Cecile	26	1.75 m (5 ft 9 in)	Tecumseh
(Prince Edward Island) Prince Edward Province	Svetlana Olipova	18	1.79 m (5 ft 10 in)	Charlottetown
Quebec Province	Brooke Elizabeth Johnston	18	1.83 m (6 ft 0 in)	Montreal
Saskatchewan Province	Frederica Johnson	20	1.73 m (5 ft 8 in)	Saskatoon
(Quebec) South Canada	Geneve de Val	24	1.72 m (5 ft 8 in)	Montreal
(Ontario) Southeast Canada	Malgosia Majewska	22	1.81 m (5 ft 11 in)	Toronto
(Alberta) Southwest Canada	Monica Wells	21	1.76 m (5 ft 9 in)	Calgary
(British Columbia) Upper Canada	Sofia King	19	1.79 m (5 ft 10 in)	Vancouver
(British Columbia) West Canada	Lauren Howard	23	1.86 m (6 ft 1 in)	Vancouver
Yukon Territory	Penelope Drews	26	1.81 m (5 ft 11 in)	Whitehorse
