= Miss Universe Canada 2012 =

10th Miss Universe Canada beauty pageant

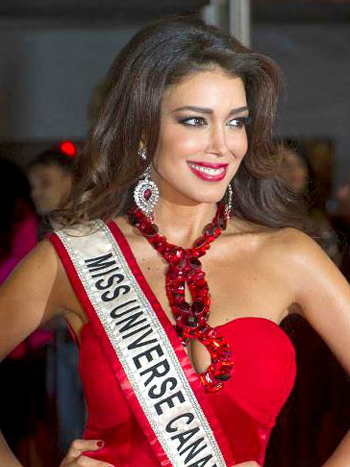
- Sahar Biniaz
- Venue: St. Lawrence Centre for the Arts, Toronto, Ontario
- Entrants: 62
- Placements: 20
- Winner: Sahar Biniaz
- Congeniality: Jenna Talackova; Kylee Apers; Maria Julia Nahri, Maria Cecilia Nicolas
- Photogenic: Ela Mino

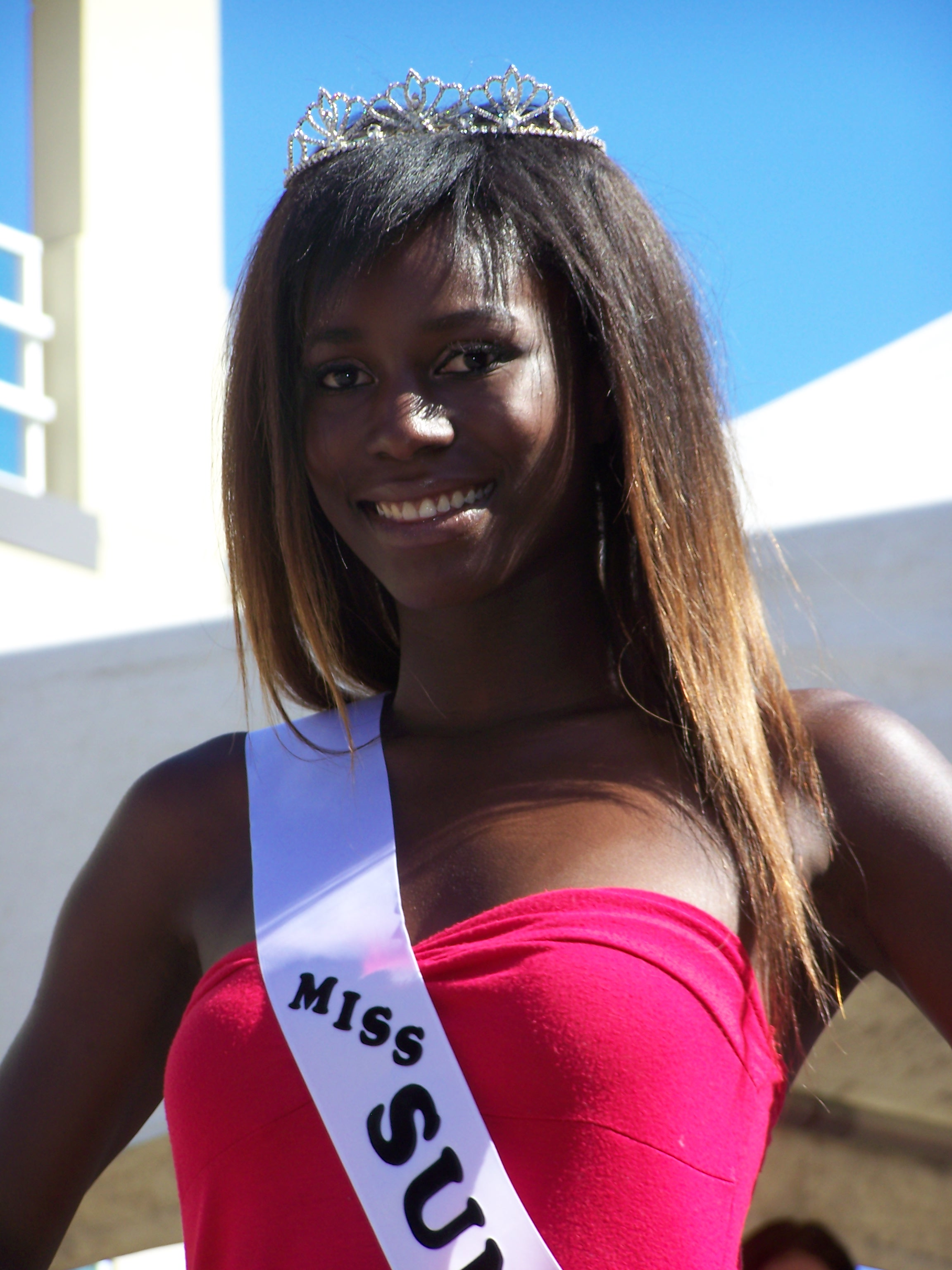
Adwoa Yamoah represented Canada in the Miss Universe 2012 pageant, replacing Sahar Biniaz

Miss Universe Canada 2012 was the 10th of the Miss Universe Canada pageant held at St. Lawrence Centre for the Arts in Toronto, Ontario.

Sahar Biniaz was crowned Miss Universe Canada 2012. She competed against 61 other contestants. Sahar Biniaz was supposed to represent Canada in the Miss Universe 2012 competition. Unfortunately, Biniaz was unable to make it and withdrew from Miss Universe 2012 competition due to a foot injury, the 1st runner-up take her placed.

== Controversy ==
The 2012 contest was accused of transphobia after disqualifying a transgender contestant, Jenna Talackova, for not being a "naturally born female". A spokesperson from Miss Universe Canada released a statement saying she was disqualified because on her entry form she stated she was born a female, which was not the case. Eventually, Talackova was let back into the competition. On 9 April 2012, Talackova confirmed on The View that she would compete for the Miss Universe Canada title on 19 May.

== Results ==
=== Placements ===
Placement	Contestant
Miss Universe Canada 2012	Sahar Biniaz
1st Runner-Up	Adwoa Yamoah
2nd Runner-Up	Majd Soudi
3rd Runner-Up	Katie Starke
4th Runner-Up	Kesiah Papasin
Top 12	Chelsea Bird; Dajana Radovanovic; Ines Kipre; Jenna Talackova; María Julia Nahri; Sarah Harrison; Suzette Hernandez
Top 20	Casar Jacobson; Christine White; Diana Schoutsen; Kuyan Elliott; Lisa Wong; Mandi Gale; Marta Jablonska; Vaughan Marr

=== Special awards ===
- Miss Congeniality – Jenna Talackova, Kylee Apers, Maria Julia Nahri, Maria Cecilia Nicolas
- Miss Photogenic – Ela Mino
- Revlon Professional Best Hair – Sahar Biniaz

== Contestants ==
Contestant	Age	Height	Hometown	Note
Adwoa Yamoah	26	5’9″	Calgary, AB	Replaced an original winner to represent Canada at Miss Universe 2012, after Biniaz withdrew due to a foot injury.
Alena Konovalova	24	5’7″	Maple, ON	
Ali Sarchuk	22	5’10″	Saskatoon, SK	
Alicia George	20	5’10″	Surrey, BC	
Alina Tsymbalarou	25	5’9″	London, ON	
Amanda Kazmierczak	21	5’6″	Toronto, ON	
Amanda Lee	20	5’9″	Steinbach, MB	
Amanda Morie	24	5’6″	Edmonton, AB	
Anna Piatrovich	24	5’10″	Richmond Hill, ON	
Brianne Kidner	19	5’8″	Edmonton, AB	
Carla Bradstock	26	5’10″	Richmond, BC	
Casar Jacobson	26	5’10″	Vancouver, BC	
Casendre Paquet	22	5’6″	Saint-Laurent, QC	
Chelsea Bird	23	5’8″	Edmonton, AB	
Chelsey Smith	23	5’9″	Edmonton, AB	
Chelsi Mittelholzer	21	5’10″	Markham, ON	
Christine Adela White	26	5’11″	Vancouver, BC	
Dajana Radovanovic	20	5’9″	Toronto, ON	
Danielle Murphy	20	6’0″	Brockville, ON	
Diana Schoutsen	24	5’9″	Binbrook, ON	Competed in Miss Universe 2013 as Honduras.
Ela Mino	20	5’8″	Calgary, AB	
Elana Wu	22	5’8″	Richmond, BC	
Ella Law	26	5’5″	Edmonton, AB	
Haley Draper	22	5’6″	London, ON	
Ines Kipre	23	5’10″	Gatineau, QC	
Isabella Romero	21	5’6″	Sherbrooke, QC	
Jasmine Pham	21	5’9″	Kapuskasing, ON	
Jenna Talackova	23	6’1″	Vancouver, BC	
Jennifer Grudic	21	5’6″	Corner Brook, NL	
Jennifer Skroch	21	5’7″	Calgary, AB	
Joyana Mitchell	24	5’7″	Beaumont, AB	
Katerina Kiprich	24	5’6″	Toronto, ON	
Katie Starke	21	5’11″	Uxbridge, ON	
Kesiah Papasin	21	5’7″	Etobicoke, ON	
Kimealia Hercules	20	5’9″	Montreal, QC	
Kuyan Elliott	19	5’9″	LaSalle, ON	
Kylee Apers	24	5’7″	Armstrong, BC	
Kyra Weston	19	5’5″	Calgary, AB	
Lisa Wong	22	5’10″	Toronto, ON	
Majd Soudi	26	5’6″	Ottawa, ON	
Mandi Gale	22	5’4″	Grand Falls-Windsor, NL	
Maria Cecilia Nicolas	26	5’6″	Thompson, MB	
Maria Julia Nahri	26	5’8″	Markham, ON	
Mariangela Avila	19	4’9″	Calgary, AB	
Marta Jablonska	24	5’10″	Hamilton, ON	
Mina Khtaria	21	5’8″	Surrey, BC	
Natka Brestovanska	23	5’10″	Orillia, ON	
Nazanin Gheitasian	23	5’7″	Vancouver, BC	
Raman Basi	23	5’8″	Calgary, AB	
Sahar Biniaz	26	5’8″	Vancouver, BC	Withdrew from the Miss Universe 2012 competition due to an injury. Later Miss Universe Iran 2025.
Samantha Morris	21	5’11″	Calgary, AB	
Sarah Harrison	24	6’0″	Halifax, Nova Scotia	
Signa Love	26	5’7″	Rothesay, NB	
Sophie Mokbel	24	5’5″	Laval, QC	
Stephanie Marinus	21	5’6″	SE Highriver, AB	
Suzette Hernandez	26	5’9″	Vancouver, BC	
Tara Davy	25	5’8″	Whitehorse, YT	
Tara Patterson	24	5’5″	London, ON	
Vania Georgieva	18	5’8″	Ottawa, ON	
Vaughan Marr	23	5’9″	Cremona, AB	
Venessa Facciotti	26	5’6″	Langley, BC	
Veronica Salcedo	21	5’8″	Dorval, QC	
