= Adwoa Yamoah =

Canadian beauty pageant titleholder

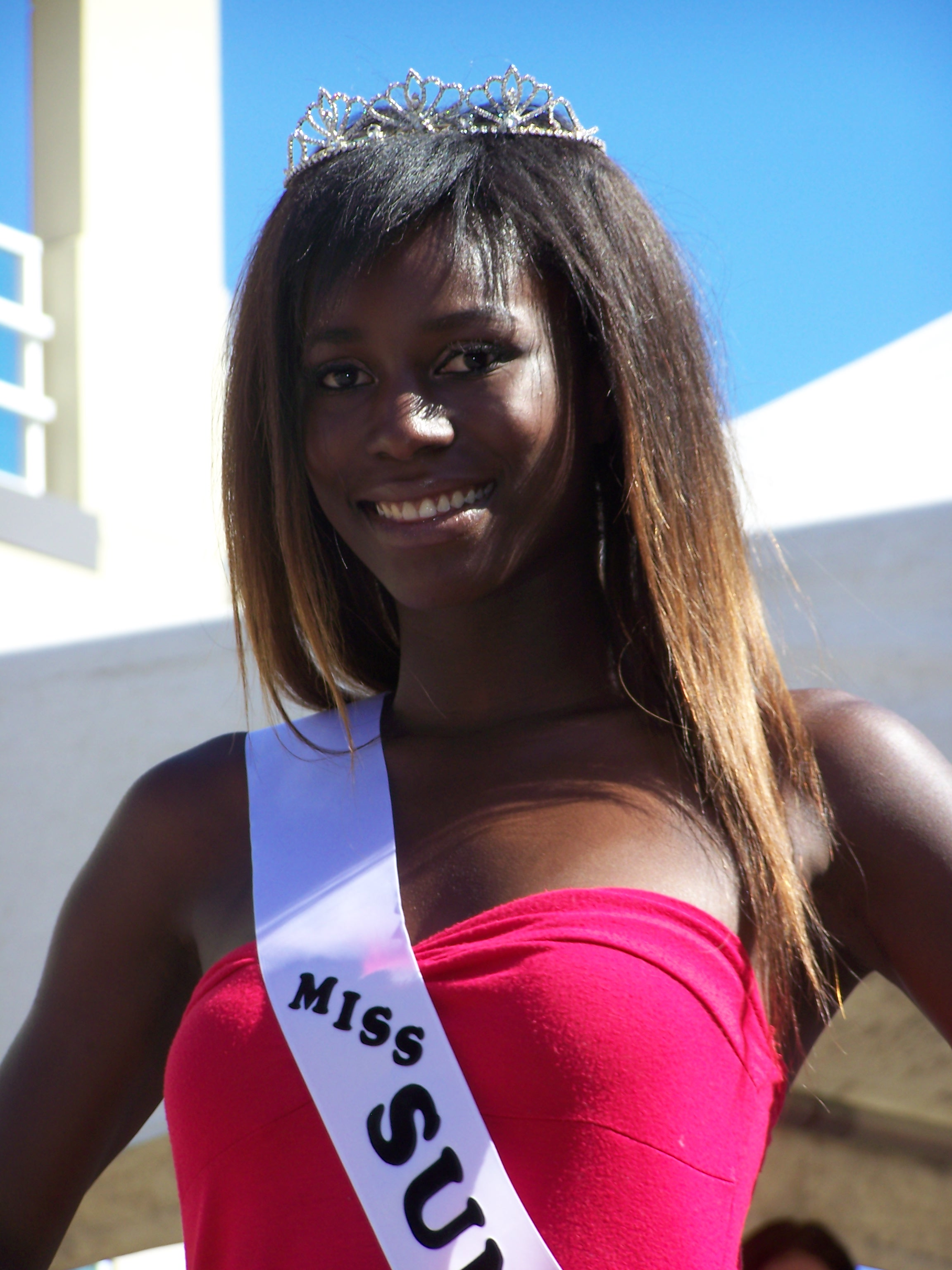
- Yamoah in Calgary (2007)
- Born: Adwoa Yamoah
- Occupation: Model
- Beauty pageant titleholder
- Title: Miss Universe Canada 2012
- Major competitions: Miss Universe Canada 2012 (1st Runner-up); Miss Universe 2012 (Unplaced)

Adwoa Yamoah is a Canadian beauty pageant titleholder who placed 1st runner-up at Miss Universe Canada 2012 and represented Canada in the Miss Universe 2012 pageant, replacing Sahar Biniaz who had been named Miss Universe Canada.

== Pageantry ==
Yamoah participated in Miss Universe 2012, and was named "Best Runway Model", while Sahar Biniaz became Miss Universe Canada 2012. Biniaz was expected to represent Canada at Miss Universe 2012 in Las Vegas, but Adwoa Yamoah, the first runner-up, got the opportunity to represent Canada.

In 2018, Jeffrey Toobin of The New Yorker reported that Donald Trump, owner of the Miss Universe Organization at the time, personally interfered with the selection of finalists in the Miss Universe contestant selection, in order to further his other business interests around the world. Tobin's reporting was based on testimony form contestants, including Yamoah, who said:

He made comments about every girl: 'I've been to that country.' 'We're building a Trump Tower there.' It was clear the countries that he liked did well. He'd whisper to Paula about the girls, and she'd write it down. He basically told us he picked nine of the top fifteen.

Awards and achievements
Preceded by Sahar Biniaz	Miss Universe Canada; 2012	Succeeded by Riza Santos
