= Roxanne Didier Nicholas =

Saint Lucian dancer and beauty pageant titleholder

- Born: Roxanne Didier Nicholas; 1992 (age 33–34); Castries, St. Lucia
- Height: 1.77 m (5 ft 10 in)
- Beauty pageant titleholder
- Title: Miss Saint Lucia Universe 2014
- Hair color: Black
- Eye color: Black
- Major competitions: Miss Saint Lucia Universe 2014 (Winner); Miss Universe 2014 (Unplaced)

Roxanne Didier Nicholas (born 1992 in Castries) is a Saint Lucian dancer and beauty pageant titleholder who was crowned Miss Saint Lucia Universe 2014 and represented her home country at Miss Universe 2014.

== Early life ==
Roxanne is a resident of Coubaril, Castries, born and raised in the community. “I have lived in Coubaril all my life with my parents, sister and brother,” she shares.

She believes her family's support has been vital to the successes in her endeavors, from her studies, to her self-expression through dance and more recently, her participation in pageantry.

This dancer states that she began exploring this talent at the age of nine at the St Lucia School of Ballet and Modern Dance. Passionate about the art form, Roxanne has indicated that she wishes to pursue advance studies in dance, as well as further develop her potential. “I wish I could have begun my study in dance at a younger age but I plan to further my dance education after I have achieved my first degree,” she commented.

“At the age of eleven,” shared Nicholas, “I became a member of the Avad Dance Ministry as well. Both groups have significantly contributed to the dancer I am today. After my first degree I would like to do my masters degree in dance education. Performing at world stage events would also be a ‘dream come’ true of mine.”

Roxanne is an alumnus of the Ave Maria Girl’s Primary School, the St. Joseph’s Convent and the Sir Arthur Lewis Community College (SALCC). “At the end of my five year secondary education I wrote nine CXC subjects, namely; Mathematics, English Language, Chemistry, Biology, Physics, Geography, Spanish, Principle of Accounts and Information Technology. I was successful in all my subjects,” the reigning Miss Carival shared.

At SALCC, Didier-Nicholas furthered her education in Accounting, Economics, Management Studies and Communication Studies.

Nicholas studied at The University of the West Indies Saint Augustine, Trinidad and Tobago.

== Pageantry ==
=== Miss St. Lucia Carnival 2011 ===
Nicholas was crowned as Miss St. Lucia Carnival Queen in the year 2011 which is an annual pageant centered on the islands culture of Carnival and Bachannal.

=== Miss Carival 2012 ===
Nicholas was crowned as Miss Carival in St Vincent in the year 2012.

=== Miss St. Lucia 2014 ===
Nicholas was crowned Miss St. Lucia 2014 and competed in Miss Universe 2014 in the USA on January 25, 2015.

=== Miss Universe 2014 ===
Nicholas competed at Miss Universe 2014 pageant but Unplaced.

Awards and achievements
Preceded by Tara Edward	Miss St. Lucia; 2014	Succeeded by Tangie Butcher
