= Marilyne Nfono =

Gabonese model

- Born: Oyem, Gabon
- Beauty pageant titleholder
- Title: Miss Gabon 2014 (2nd Runner-up)
- Hair color: Black
- Eye color: Black
- Major competitions: Miss Gabon 2014 (2nd Runner-up); Miss Earth 2014

Hulda Marilyne Nfono Ondo is a Gabonese model and beauty pageant titleholder who represented Woleu-Ntem in the 2014 Miss Gabon pageant. She was crowned the second Runner-up at Miss Gabon, behind the winner Maggaly Nguema, who represented the Estuaire province, and automatically awarded Miss Earth Gabon 2014.

== Category ==
- Miss Earth 2014
- Miss Gabon
