= Tara Edward =

Saint Lucian model and beauty pageant titleholder

- Born: Tara Edward; November 11, 1987 (age 38); Gros Islet, St. Lucia
- Height: 1.80 m (5 ft 11 in)
- Beauty pageant titleholder
- Title: Miss St. Lucia 2012
- Hair color: Black
- Major competitions: Miss St.Lucia 2012 (Winner); Miss Universe 2012 (Unplaced)

Tara Edward (born November 11, 1987) is a St. Lucian director, model and beauty pageant titleholder who was crowned Miss Universe St.Lucia in 2012 and represented her country at Miss Universe 2012 in Las Vegas but Unplaced. Tara also participated in St. Lucia Carnival Queen in 2011 where she placed second runner up.

== Early life ==
Tara was born on November 11, 1987, and grew up in Marisule, St. Lucia. She attended the Bocage Secondary School, where she participated in netball and volleyball she was an active student at school, President of a school's Red Cross group and a Peer Helper to her peers. Tara graduated as Netballer of the year in 2006. Tara began work as a model at a young age, and dream of working in the fashion industry.

Tara is currently pursuing a degree Fashion Marketing Management at International Fashion Academy in Paris.

== Pageants ==
Appointed as Ms. St. Lucia for 2012, Tara went on to compete at the Miss Universe 2012 pageant in Las Vegas. Although a heavy favorite especially among the "black" candidates, she was not able to penetrate the semifinals through placing in the Top 16.

Awards and achievements
Preceded by Joy-Ann Biscette	Miss St. Lucia; 2012	Succeeded by Roxanne Nicholas
