= Sahar Biniaz =

Persian-Canadian actress

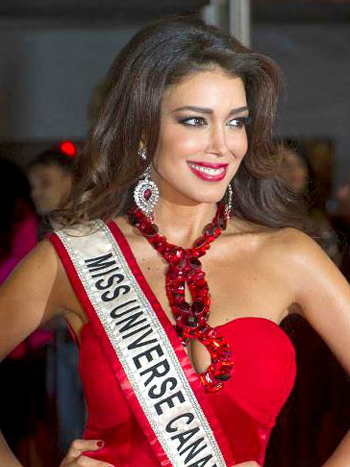
- Sahar Biniaz at the Times Of India Film Awards 2013
- Born: Sahar Biniaz; November 17, 1986 (age 39); Bengaluru, Karnataka, India
- Height: 1.72 m (5 ft 8 in)
- Beauty pageant titleholder
- Title: Miss Universe Canada 2012; Miss Universe Persia 2025
- Hair color: Brown
- Eye color: Brown
- Major competitions: Miss Universe Canada 2003 (Unplaced); Miss Universe Canada 2008 (1st Runner-Up); Miss Universe Canada 2012 (Winner); Miss Universe Persia 2025 (Winner)

Sahar Biniaz (born November 17, 1986) is a Persian-Canadian actress, model and beauty pageant titleholder who won Miss Universe Canada 2012 and Miss Universe Persia 2025. She had a recurring role on the hit TV show Sanctuary as the Hindu goddess of power Kali. She was set to represent Iran at Miss Universe 2025 pageant held in Thailand, but later withdrew in solidarity with and out of respect for her national director, Golshan Barazesh — whose unexplained detention in Iran is a serious human rights concern.

== Biography ==
Biniaz was born in Bengaluru, Karnataka, India to an Iranian family. She grew up in Iran, and a few years later, her family moved to Vancouver, Canada, where she became a naturalized Canadian. She graduated with honors from the Stella Adler Studio of Acting School in Los Angeles.

== Pageant history ==
Biniaz competed in the Miss Universe Canada 2003 pageant where she did not place. She went on to compete in beauty pageants representing Canada, including winning 1st runner-up in Miss Universe Canada 2008. Four years later, she competed in the same pageant and won the title of Miss Universe Canada 2012. She also won the Revlon Professional Best Hair award. Biniaz was initially set to represent Canada at Miss Universe 2012 in the United States, but was forced to withdraw due to a foot injury and was subsequently replaced by 1st Runner-Up Adwoa Yamoah. Thirteen years later, on May 31, 2025, she was crowned Miss Universe Persia 2025 in Oberhausen, Germany and was set to represent Iran at Miss Universe 2025 in Thailand but withdrew.

== Personal causes; pit bulls ==
At the age of 14, Biniaz was mauled by a family pit bull. "The Richmond resident was the victim of a pit bull attack herself at the age of 14, a year after her family adopted a five-month-old pit bull from a breeder. The pit bull 'came from a really nice environment', she said, but 'then I ended up getting 16 stitches. Biniaz still bears the scars on her chest to this day."

As a result of being a pit bull victim, in 2012, she decided to join the fight for pit bull controls and "plans to make the effort a major part of her [Miss Universe Canada] reign... noting that with her Miss Universe Canada title she now has a voice to bring more awareness to this issue."

She consequently became the object of vitriol from pit bull advocates, who lobbied the Miss Universe organization to strip her of her title for speaking out. Some pit bull advocates accused her of not really being Canadian and not representing Canadian values.

Year	Pageant	Placement
2003	Miss Universe Canada	Unplaced
2003	Miss Global Beauty Queen	1st Runner-up
2008	Miss Tourism Queen International	2nd runner-up
2008	Miss Universe Canada	1st runner-up
2012	Miss Universe Canada	Winner
2025	Miss Universe Persia	Winner

== Filmography ==
Film roles
Year	Title	Role	Notes
2005	Neal 'n' Nikki	Teacher	
2009	Watchmen	Foreign Newscaster (as Sahar)	
2009	2012	Showgirl (uncredited)	
2010	The Search for Santa Paws	Posh Poodle Woman	Video
2012	Ambrosia	Leila	
2013	Tom Dick & Harriet	Car Model	TV movie

Television roles
Year	Title	Role	Notes
2006	Blade: The Series	Sabine	6 episodes
2007	Painkiller Jane	Hottie	1 episode
2008	Under One Roof	Sylvia	1 episode
2010	Blue Mountain State	Natrina	1 episode
2007–2010	Smallville	Shayera Hall, background roles	4 episodes
2010	Sanctuary	Kali	4 episodes
2012	True Justice	Madame	1 episode

== See also ==
- List of Iranian women models and beauty pageant titleholders

Awards and achievements
Preceded by Ava Vahneshan	Miss Universe Persia; 2025	Incumbent
Preceded by Chelsae Durocher	Miss Universe Canada; 2012	Succeeded by Adwoa Yamoah
