= Maria Luisa Vicuña =

- Born: María Luisa Vicuña Zamorano; Sonsonate, El Salvador
- Height: 1.75 m (5 ft 9 in)
- Beauty pageant titleholder
- Title: Nuestra Belleza Mundo 2012
- Hair color: brown
- Eye color: brown
- Major competitions: Nuestra Belleza El Salvador 2012; Miss World 2012; Miss Continente Americano 2012

Maria Luisa Vicuña is a Salvadoran TV host and beauty pageant titleholder who represented her country at Miss World 2012 in Ordos City, China.

== Biography ==
Born in the Sonsonate, El Salvador, Vicuña is the youngest of 3 children. Her parents were Colombian civil engineers who came to El Salvador to work on the “El Puente de Oro” (The Golden Bridge) that connected the rest of the country to the east. Vicuña was a model before becoming Nuestra Belleza Mundo 2012. She then competed in the Miss World 2012, but did not place among the semifinals.

After participating in Miss World and Miss Continente Americano, Vicuña became host to a new program in TCS called Sabaton, where she currently works for.
