= Nuestra Belleza El Salvador 2012 =

Beauty pageant edition

- Date: April 27, 2012
- Presenters: Sonia Cruz & Rebeca Iraheta
- Entertainment: Dyland y Lenny
- Broadcaster: Canal 2
- Entrants: 17
- Placements: 10
- Winner: Ana Yancy Clavel and Maria Luisa Vicuña
- Congeniality: Stacy Hercules
- Photogenic: Tania Arteaga

Nuestra Belleza El Salvador 2012 took place on April 27, 2012 at the Hotel Royal Decameron in Salinitas, Sonsonate. Nuestra Belleza Universo 2011, Alejandra Ochoa and Nuestra Belleza Mundo 2011 crowned their perspective successors at the end of the event. The co winners will represent El Salvador at Miss Universe 2012, Miss World 2012 and Miss Continente Americano 2012. Also the overall winner, "Nuestra Belleza Universo 2012" will take home even more prizes than years before, including a brand new Honda car.

For the first time ever, the national preliminary castings took place live on the internet on the official website. The finalists were selected from 164 applicants who were presented to the three day casting made in the forum 4 of TCS in late January, early February judged by Raul Dominguez, Executive Producer of the event, Diana Rivera, head image of TCS and person in charge of the Miss Universe & Miss World franchise, and Tony Melara, runway model instructor. Both the opinion of the jury and public votes cast online were also taken into account in the selection of the 17 finalists.

== Results ==
Final results	Contestant
Nuestra Belleza El Salvador Universo 2012	Ana Yancy Clavel
Nuestra Belleza El Salvador Mundo 2012	Maria Luisa Vicuña
1st Runner-Up	Irene Carballo
2nd Runner-Up	Tania Arteaga
3rd Runner-Up	Michelle Carazo
Top 10	Stacy Hercules; Jeimmy Galvez; Magali Cea; Andrea Quintanilla; Evelyn Franco

== Contestants ==
Contestant	Age	Height
Lucia Flores	18	1.70 m (5 ft 7 in)
Magali Cea	20	1.63 m (5 ft 4 in)
Michelle Caranzo	23	1.67 m (5 ft 5 1/2 in)
Jeimmy Gálvez	21	1.68 m (5 ft 6 in)
Karen Escalante	19	1.70 m (5 ft 7 in)
Sandy Vaquerano	22	1.70 m (5 ft 7 in)
Andrea Quintanilla	18	1.62 m (5 ft 4 in)
Evelyn Franco	19	1.63 m (5 ft 4 in)
Nancy Ramirez	20	1.65 m (5 ft 5 in)
Maria Luisa Vicuna	18	1.75 m (5 ft 9 in)
Irene Carballo	20	1.69 m (5 ft 6 1/2 in)
Lidia Aguilar	21	1.68 m (5 ft 6 in)
Ana Yancy Clavel	19	1.73 m (5 ft 8 in)
Eva Magana	18	1.63 m (5 ft 4 in)
Alejandra Ortiz	19	1.76 m (5 ft 9 1/2 in)
Tania Arteaga	18	1.60 m (5 ft 3 in)
Stacy Hércules	22	1.70 m (5 ft 7 in)
