= Laura Godoy =

Guatemalan volleyball player, model and beauty pageant titleholder

- Born: Laura Beatriz Godoy; July 6, 1988 (age 38)
- Height: 1.76 m (5 ft 9 1/2 in)
- Beauty pageant titleholder
- Title: Miss Guatemala 2011
- Hair color: Brown
- Major competitions: Miss Guatemala 2011 (Winner); Miss Universe 2012 (Unplaced)

Laura Beatriz Godoy Calle (born July 6, 1988) is a Guatemalan volleyball player, model and beauty pageant titleholder who was crowned Miss Guatemala 2011 and represented her country in the 2012 Miss Universe contest.

== Early life ==
Godoy was born on July 6, 1988. She was a volleyball player for the Guatemalan national team.

== Miss Guatemala 2012 ==
Godoy was crowned Miss Universe Guatemala 2012 by Alejandra Barillas (Miss Universe Guatemala 2011) at the Convention Center Light, Real Life Evangelical Church, Zone 10 of Guatemala City on November 25, 2011. Godoy said that, as Miss Guatemala, she felt like an ambassador for her country. She said that she felt a great deal of pressure moving forward to the Miss Universe pageant because she was representing Guatemala instead of just representing herself.

== Miss Universe 2012 ==
Godoy competed in the 61st edition of the Miss Universe pageant. She was named Miss Congeniality Universe. She was the first Guatemalan to win the award.

== Personal ==
In a 2013 interview, Godoy said that modeling was one of her passions but she was about to stop her modeling career as she looked toward work in nutrition. She has also studied elementary education. In 2012, she said that her dream was to establish a nutrition education center.

Awards and achievements
Preceded by Alejandra Jose Barillas	Miss Guatemala; 2011	Succeeded by Paulette Samayoa
