= Weronika Szmajdzińska =

Polish beauty pageant titleholder (born 1994)

- Born: 26 April 1994 (age 32); Szczecin, Poland
- Height: 1.75 m (5 ft 9 in)
- Beauty pageant titleholder
- Title: Miss Polski Nastolatek 2011; Miss Global Teen 2012
- Hair color: Brown
- Eye color: Hazel
- Major competitions: Miss Polski Nastolatek 2011 (Winner); Miss Global Teen 2012 (Winner); Miss World 2012 (Unplaced); Miss Universe 2015 (Unplaced)

Weronika Szmajdzińska (born 26 April 1994) is a Polish beauty pageant titleholder who was crowned Miss Polski Nastolatek 2011 and Miss Global Teen 2012.

She was appointed to compete in Miss Universe 2015 pageant. She also represented Poland at the Miss World 2012 pageant, where she was the first runner-up for the Top Model prize, but did not place in the actual pageant.

== Personal life ==
Szmajdzińska was born in 1994 and raised in the city of Szczecin.

Szmajdzińska was appointed Miss World Poland 2012, after being Miss Polski Nastolatek 2011 (Miss Poland Teen 2011). She then competed at the Miss World 2012 pageant in Ordos City, China. She was the first runner-up for the Top Model award and also a finalist for the Beach Fashion and Interview awards, but did not place in the actual pageant.

She was also appointed Miss Universe Poland 2015 and competed the Miss Universe 2015 pageant, but was unplaced.

== General references ==
- "Weronika Szmajdzińska". missuniverse.com. IMG Universe.
