= Reine Ngotala =

Gabonese model (born 1997)

- Born: Reine Ngotala; October 5, 1997 (age 29); Nyanga, Gabon
- Height: 1.77 m (5 ft 9 1/2 in)
- Beauty pageant titleholder
- Title: Miss Gabon 2015
- Hair color: Black
- Eye color: Brown
- Major competitions: Miss Gabon 2015 (Winner); Miss World 2015 (Unplaced)

Reine Ngotala (born October 5, 1997, in Nyanga, Gabon) is a Gabonese model and beauty pageant titleholder who was crowned Miss Gabon 2015 and represented Gabon at the Miss World 2015 but Unplaced.

== Personal life ==
Ngotala is an economic student at the l'Institut Supérieur d'Ingénierie in Libreville.

=== Miss Gabon 2015 ===
On April 26, 2015, Ngotala was crowned Miss Gabon 2015 which featured eighteen contestants who competed at the pageant. As Miss Gabon 2015, Ngotala represented Gabon at the Miss World 2015.

Reine Ngotala who crowned Miss Gabon actually scheduled to compete at the Miss Universe and Miss World before Miss Universe announced the official schedule. Reine only competed at the Miss World instead. Her runner-up, Anis Christine Pitty Yaya took the title to compete at the Miss Universe 2015.

== Links ==
- Official Miss Gabon Facebook

Awards and achievements
Preceded by Maggaly Nguema	Miss Gabon; 2015	Succeeded by Incumbent
