= Maggaly Nguema =

Gabonese beauty pageant titleholder

Maggaly Omrnellia Emmanuelle Nguema
- Born: Maggaly Omrnellia Emmanuelle Nguema; 1993 (age 32–33); Libreville, Gabon
- Height: 1.75 m (5 ft 9 in)
- Beauty pageant titleholder
- Title: Miss Gabon 2014
- Hair color: Black
- Eye color: Brown
- Major competitions: Miss Gabon 2014 (Winner); Miss International 2014 (Unplaced); Miss Supranational 2014 (2nd runner-up); Miss Universe 2014 (Unplaced)

Maggaly Nguema (born 1993) is a Gabonese beauty pageant titleholder who was crowned Miss Gabon 2014 and represented Gabon at the Miss Universe 2014.

== Early life ==
Nguema is a 3 BA student at the National Institute of Science and Management (INSG. She also works as a model.

== Pageantry ==
=== Miss Gabon 2014 ===
Nguema was crowned as the new Miss Gabon 2014. She was crowned by Jennifer Ondo Mouchita, Miss Gabon 2013. She represented the province of the estuary (province de l'Estuaire) and won the Miss Gabon crown on November 30, 2013 in Libreville.

=== Miss International 2014 ===
Nguema represented Gabon at Miss International 2014 where she competed to succeed the winner of Miss International 2013, Bea Santiago of the Philippines

=== Miss Supranational 2014 ===
Nguema represented Gabon at Miss Supranational 2014 where she competed to succeed the current titleholder, Mutya Datul of the Philippines and placed as 2nd runner up. The Miss Supranational 2014 crown was won by Asha Bhat of India.

=== Miss Universe 2014 ===
Nguema represented Gabon at Miss Universe 2014 where she competed to succeed Miss Universe 2013, Gabriela Isler of Venezuela.

== Links ==
- Official Miss Gabon Facebook
- Page on BeautyPageant.info

Awards and achievements
| Preceded by Jennifer Ondo | Miss Gabon; 2014 | Succeeded by Reine Ngotala |

Awards and achievements
| Preceded by Jennifer Ondo | Gabon Representative at the Miss Universe; 2014 | Succeeded by Ornella Obone |
