= Katarzyna Dziedzic =

Katarzyna Dziedzic is a Polish-born Canadian model and former beauty pageant titleholder who was Miss International Canada 2003. She studied criminology in the faculty of law at the University of Windsor.

== Pageant history ==
Dziedzic competed in pageants including:

- Miss Universe Western Ontario 2002, Windsor, Ontario (Winner)
- Miss Universe Canada 2003, Toronto, Ontario
- Miss International Canada 2003, Edmonton, Alberta (Winner)
- Miss International 2003, Tokyo, Japan
- Miss Polonia International 2004, Vienna, Austria
