= Marie-Noëlle Ada =

Gabonese beauty pageant titleholder

Marie Noëlle Ada Meyo
- Born: 6 April 1990 (age 36); Ngounie, Gabon
- Height: 1.70 m (5 ft 7 in)
- Beauty pageant titleholder
- Title: Miss Gabon 2012
- Hair color: Black
- Major competitions: Miss Gabon 2012 (Winner); Miss World 2012 (Unplaced)

Marie Noëlle Ada Meyo (born 6 April 1990) is a Gabonese beauty pageant titleholder who was crowned Miss Gabon 2012. She attended the École supérieure de journalisme de Lille in Lille, France.

== Miss Gabon 2012 ==
Marie Noelle Ada is from the province of Ngounie. She was crowned Miss Gabon 2012 by Miss Universe 2011 Leila Lopes during a festive gala on December 29, 2011, at the "City of Democracy" in Libreville. She won cash, a house and a Hyundai ix35. She entered the Miss World 2012 competition in China.

== Miss World ==
On August 18, 2012, she represented Gabon at Miss World held in the Ordos Stadium Arena in Ordos City, China.

Ada said that her goals included the construction of a nursing home during her reign as Miss Gabon.

Awards and achievements
Preceded by Marlyne Eyene Ella	Miss Gabon; 2012	Succeeded by Channa Divouvi
