= Casar Jacobson =

Canadian actress, pageant competitor and activist

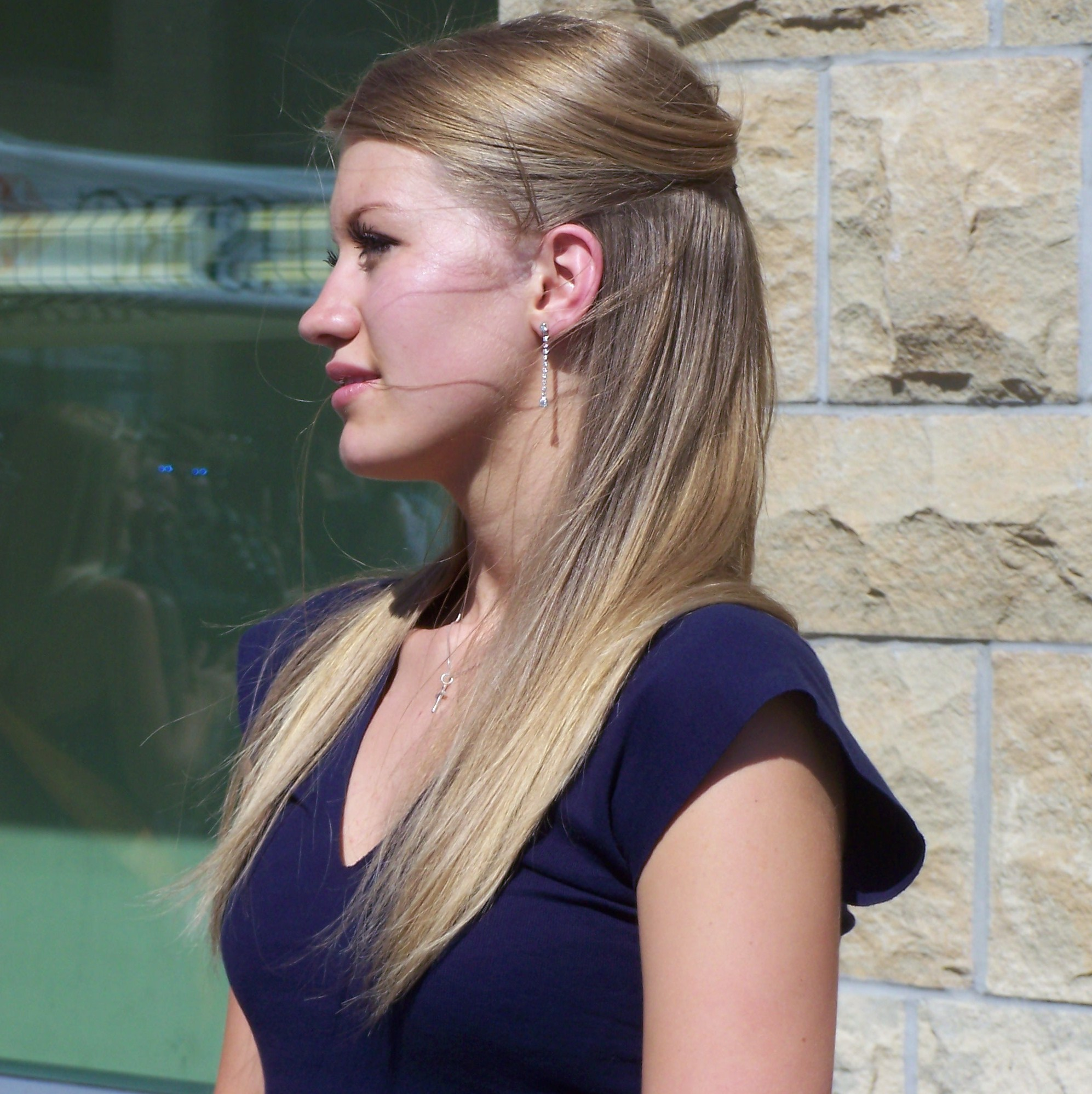
- Jacobson (2008)
- Born: November 8, 1985 (age 41)
- Citizenship: Canadian
- Occupations: actress, disability rights activist, public speaker
- Known for: Disability and gender equality advocacy
- Title: Miss Canada Globe 2012/2013
- Website: https://casarjacobson.com/

Casar Jacobson (born November 8, 1985) is a Norwegian-Canadian actress, UN disability rights campaigner and also former beauty pageant titleholder. She has been a disability, equality and gender rights activist, and a UN Women Youth Champion. She has also been a successful pageant contestant, winning Miss Canada Globe.

== Early life and education ==
Cäsar Jacobson was born in 1985 and grew up on a farm. According to her own account, Jacobson was born hard of hearing, lost the hearing in her right ear in the mid-2000s, and became completely deaf around 2012-2013. She later received a cochlear implant and learned to communicate using American Sign Language. She later lived in Vancouver, British Columbia.

== Pageantry ==
Casar began modeling and competing in pageants in 2008, and in 2012 became the face of the clothing brand Bellissima Style's spring/summer campaign. She competed for Miss Sun and Salsa, Miss Calgary, Canadas Sexiest Girl and in 2012, representing Vancouver, British Columbia, she received the most audience votes on the pageant's opening night and placed in the top 20 in Miss Universe Canada after failing to place in 2011. In 2013 she won the title Miss British Columbia Globe 2012/2013. After that, she became Miss Canada Globe 2013. She traveled to Albania to compete in the Miss Globe pageant, in which she was awarded the title of "Miss Peace". Casar has been romantically linked to a supernatural producer Jim Michaels since 2017.

== Acting career ==
Jacobson appeared in the television series The Murders (2019), in which she played Emily Harris, and ABC's The Good Doctor (2020). Her film work includes Bomb City (2017), Talk to the Hands (2019), and the short film "Came with Cuffs" (2021). She is known for portraying deaf characters.

== Advocacy and public profile ==
Jacobson became involved in disability and gender-equality advocacy following her hearing loss. In 2017, she served as a gender-equality spokesperson for UN Global Compact Canada"Casar Jacobson". Global Compact Network Canada. Archived from the original on 2018-09-09. and participated in a United Nations panel for International Women’s Day that March."UN News". United Nations. 9 March 2017. She was also identified by UN Women as a Youth Champion and participated in the Youth Forum associated with the 61st session of the United Nations Commission on the Status of Women. In an interview published by UN Women, Jacobson discussed access to technology for women with disabilities and said she was working with partners on non-invasive technology intended to restore hearing."From where I stand: "Technology sees skills before gender and disability"". UN Women. April 6, 2017."Watch Live as the United Nations Celebrates International Women's Day". Time. March 8, 2017. Archived from the original on March 13, 2017.

In 2017, Jacobson became a brand ambassador for the NUGUNA Neckband, a wearable device developed by South Korean company UFirst that alerts users with hearing loss to sounds through vibration. The company said that Jacobson was selected in connection with her own hearing disability."Nuguna, the Neckband-type Wearable Device for Hearing-impaired People". AVING News. February 21, 2019. Later that year, she was quoted by ‘’Vice’’ discussing accessibility problems in smart cities, including the reliance of airports on audible announcements and barriers encountered by deaf residents and travellers.

Jacobson’s public profile during this period also included commercial and beauty-industry activities. In a 2014 review published under her name, she stated that she had undergone liposculpture and breast augmentation at Partington Plastic Surgery in Kirkland, Washington. Jacobson linked the procedures both to personal confidence and to what she described as a “competitive edge” in pageantry and on-camera work.Jacobson, Casar (September 18, 2014). "You Don't Know What You Don't Know. Kirkland, WA". RealSelf.

Jacobson was also associated with Kyäni, a nutritional-supplement company operating through network or multi-level marketing. Kyäni described itself as a “global network marketing company”, while Canadian trademark filings for its products state that they were marketed and sold through multi-level-marketing distributors."Kyäni Global Income Disclosure Statement". Kyäni."KYÄNI ORIGIN — 2179409". Canadian Intellectual Property Office.

Jacobson later completed the Saint Elizabeth Home Health Care Assistant program and said that she aspired to become a physician."Hearing Loss Hero: Casar Jacobson". Hearing Associates of Las Vegas. 2020-03-27. During the COVID-19 pandemic, she was among essential workers in Vancouver profiled as part of the ‘‘Humans of Support’’ photography project."Photographers are sharing vivid accounts from frontline workers in an Instagram account called 'Humans of Support,' and it's showing others what life is like in essential services". Business Insider.

== Filmography ==
Film
Year	Title	Role	Notes
2014	Behind the Dress	Herself	Documentary short
2017	Bomb City	Officer Denny's Wife	Uncredited
2021	Came with Cuffs	Siyah	Short film
2022	Talk to the Hands	Emma's Deaf Co-worker	Post-production

Television
Year	Title	Role	Notes
2019	The Murders	Emily Harris	Episode 5: "Toxic"
2020	The Good Doctor	Bartender	Season 3 episode 18: "Heartbreak"
TBA	Lights! Camera! Signs!	Herself	Documentary short Filming
