= Joy-Ann Biscette =

Saint Lucian model (born 1986)

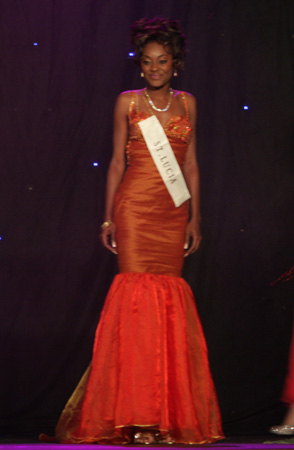
- Biscette in 2008
- Born: Joy-Ann Biscette; 1986 (age 39–40); Castries, Saint Lucia
- Height: 1.73m (5ft 8in)
- Beauty pageant titleholder
- Title: Miss St. Lucia 2008; Miss St. Lucia Universe (2011)
- Hair color: black
- Eye color: brown

Joy-Ann Biscette is a Saint Lucian model and beauty pageant titleholder that has represented her country at several regional and international pageants from 2005 to 2013.

After winning a local pageant in St. Lucia in 2005, she represented the country at Miss World 2008 in South Africa and Miss Jamzone 2010 held in Guyana where she was first runner up. Having worked in the sales and service sector of the tourism industry and as an associate degree holder from Arthur Lewis Community College she entered the Miss St Lucia Universe pageant and won. As Miss St. Lucia Universe, she went to Miss Universe 2011 held in São Paulo, Brazil. In 2013 she also participated as Miss St. Lucia in the Caribbean Miss World pageant, placing as the third runner up.
