= Demographics of Gabon =

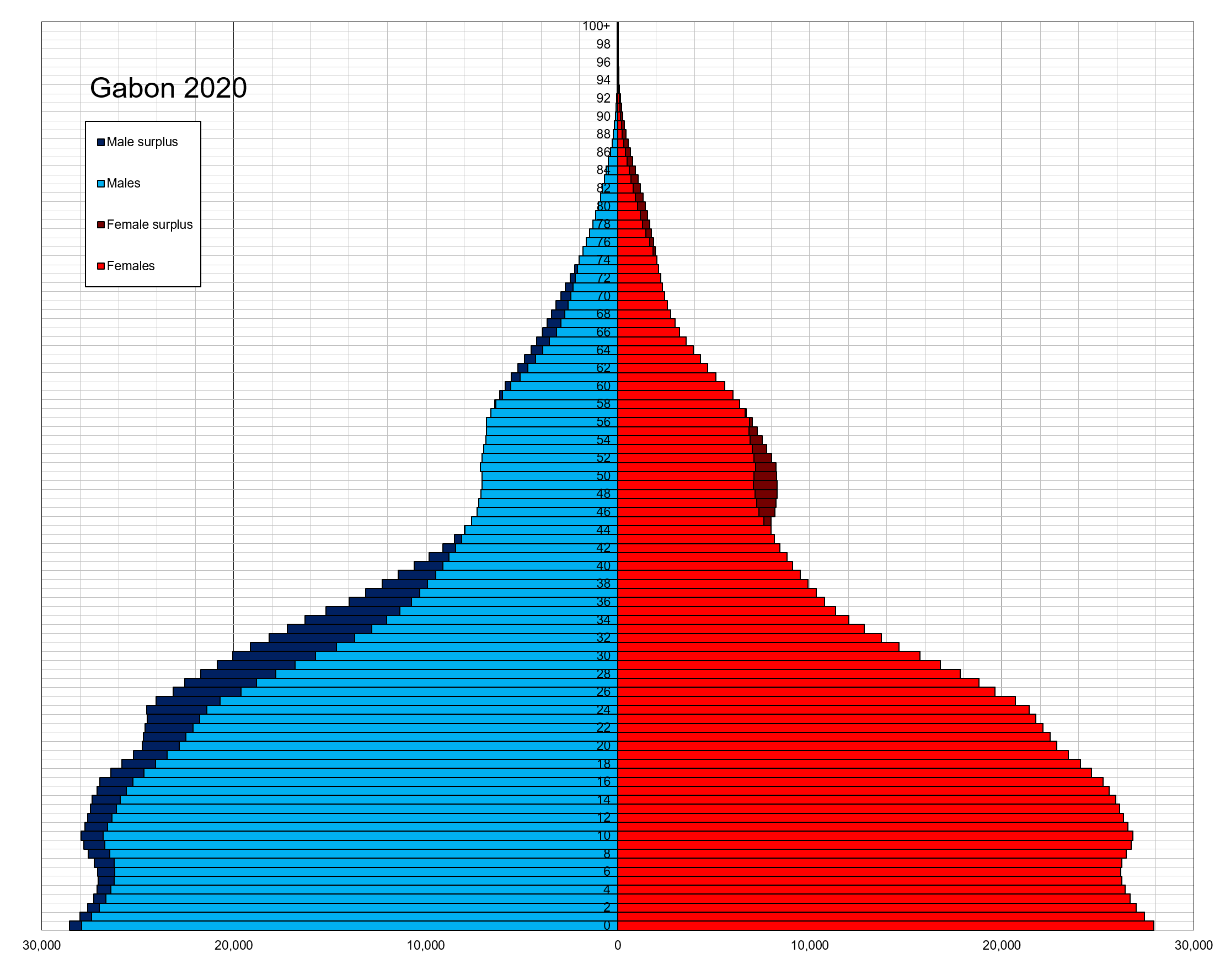
- Population pyramid of Gabon in 2020
- Population: 2,340,613 (2022 est.)
- Growth rate: 2.4% (2022 est.)
- Birth rate: 26.03 births/1,000 population (2022 est.)
- Death rate: 5.67 deaths/1,000 population (2022 est.)
- Life expectancy: 69.7 years
  - male: 67.98 years
  - female: 71.48 years (2022 est.)
- Fertility rate: 3.31 children born/woman (2022 est.)
- Infant mortality: 28.56 deaths/1,000 live births
- Net migration rate: 3.67 migrant(s)/1,000 population (2022 est.)
- Immigrant share: 17.7% (2024)

Age structure
- 0–14 years: 36.45%
- 65 and over: 3.98%

Sex ratio
- Total: 1.08 male(s)/female (2022 est.)
- At birth: 1.03 male(s)/female
- Under 15: 1.03 male(s)/female
- 65 and over: 0.78 male(s)/female

Nationality
- Nationality: Gabonese

Language
- Official: French
- Spoken: Fang and other Bantu languages; Baka

The Demographics of Gabon is the makeup of the population of Gabon. As of 2020, Gabon has a population of 2,225,287. Gabon's population is relatively young with 35.5% of its population under 15 years of age and only 4.3% of its population over 65 years old. Gabon has a nearly even split between males and females with 0.99 males for every female in the population. In the age range of 15–65, the ratio is exactly 1 male to 1 female. The life expectancy of Gabon is lower than the world average. Gabon's population's life expectancy at birth is 53.11 years while the world average is 67.2 years as of 2010. Ethnically, the biggest group in Gabon are the Fang people with over 500,000 people, or about a third of Gabon's population, belonging to this ethnic group. The biggest religion in Gabon is Christianity, with between 55 and 75% of the population of Gabon being Christian.

== Population ==
Gabon population statistics (1950–2014)

According to the 2022 revision of the World Population Prospects the total population was 2,341,179 in 2021, compared to only 469,000 in 1950. The proportion of children below the age of 15 in 2010 was 35.5%, 60.2% was between 15 and 65 years of age, while 4.3% was 65 years or older .

| Year | Total population | Population percent | | |
| Year | Total population | aged 0–14 | aged 15–64 | aged 65+ |
|---|---|---|---|---|
| 1950 | 469 000 | 28.4% | 64.3% | 7.3% |
| 1955 | 476 000 | 29.4% | 63.5% | 7.1% |
| 1960 | 486 000 | 30.3% | 62.6% | 7.1% |
| 1965 | 502 000 | 31.9% | 61.1% | 7.1% |
| 1970 | 530 000 | 33.0% | 59.9% | 7.1% |
| 1975 | 595 000 | 35.2% | 58.0% | 6.8% |
| 1980 | 683 000 | 37.7% | 55.9% | 6.4% |
| 1985 | 794 000 | 40.0% | 54.0% | 6.0% |
| 1990 | 929 000 | 41.4% | 53.0% | 5.6% |
| 1995 | 1 087 000 | 42.0% | 52.8% | 5.1% |
| 2000 | 1 235 000 | 41.0% | 54.3% | 4.8% |
| 2005 | 1 371 000 | 38.6% | 57.0% | 4.4% |
| 2010 | 1 505 000 | 35.5% | 60.2% | 4.3% |

Structure of the population (DHS 2012; males 19,318, females 20,636, total 39,955):

| Age group | Male (%) | Female (%) | Total (%) |
|---|---|---|---|
| 0–4 | 16.0 | 14.3 | 15.1 |
| 5–9 | 12.4 | 12.4 | 12.4 |
| 10–14 | 12.0 | 12.5 | 12.3 |
| 15–19 | 9.6 | 9.9 | 9.7 |
| 20–24 | 7.6 | 9.6 | 8.7 |
| 25–29 | 7.5 | 8.4 | 8.0 |
| 30–34 | 7.8 | 7.0 | 7.4 |
| 35–39 | 6.6 | 5.4 | 5.9 |
| 40–44 | 5.4 | 4.4 | 4.9 |
| 45–49 | 4.1 | 3.3 | 3.7 |
| 50–54 | 3.4 | 4.2 | 3.8 |
| 55–59 | 2.0 | 2.3 | 2.1 |
| 60–64 | 2.6 | 1.7 | 2.1 |
| 65–69 | 1.1 | 1.4 | 1.2 |
| 70–74 | 0.9 | 1.3 | 1.1 |
| 75–79 | 0.6 | 0.7 | 0.6 |
| 80+ | 0.5 | 1.3 | 0.9 |

| Age group | Male (%) | Female (%) | Total (%) |
|---|---|---|---|
| 0–14 | 40.4 | 39.2 | 39.8 |
| 15–64 | 56.5 | 56.1 | 56.4 |
| 65+ | 3.1 | 4.7 | 3.8 |

== Vital statistics ==
Registration of vital events is in Gabon not complete. The Population Department of the United Nations prepared the following estimates. Population estimates account for under numeration in population censuses.

| | Mid-year population | Live births | Deaths | Natural change | Crude birth rate (per 1000) | Crude death rate (per 1000) | Natural change (per 1000) | Total fertility rate (TFR) | Infant mortality (per 1000 live births) | Life expectancy (in years) |
|---|---|---|---|---|---|---|---|---|---|---|
| 1950 | 473,000 | 14,000 | 11,000 | 3,000 | 30.2 | 24.1 | 6.0 | 3.95 | 158.6 | 39.63 |
| 1951 | 476,000 | 14,000 | 11,000 | 3,000 | 30.1 | 23.8 | 6.3 | 3.95 | 154.9 | 40.34 |
| 1952 | 479,000 | 14,000 | 11,000 | 3,000 | 30.1 | 23.5 | 6.6 | 3.97 | 151.3 | 41.04 |
| 1953 | 482,000 | 15,000 | 11,000 | 3,000 | 30.1 | 23.0 | 7.1 | 3.99 | 147.7 | 41.81 |
| 1954 | 486,000 | 15,000 | 11,000 | 4,000 | 30.2 | 22.8 | 7.4 | 4.03 | 144.3 | 42.43 |
| 1955 | 489,000 | 15,000 | 11,000 | 4,000 | 30.3 | 22.3 | 8.0 | 4.07 | 140.7 | 43.18 |
| 1956 | 494,000 | 15,000 | 11,000 | 4,000 | 30.5 | 22.0 | 8.5 | 4.12 | 137.2 | 43.90 |
| 1957 | 498,000 | 15,000 | 11,000 | 5,000 | 30.7 | 21.6 | 9.1 | 4.17 | 133.8 | 44.60 |
| 1958 | 503,000 | 16,000 | 11,000 | 5,000 | 31.1 | 21.3 | 9.8 | 4.25 | 130.5 | 45.28 |
| 1959 | 508,000 | 16,000 | 11,000 | 5,000 | 31.5 | 21.0 | 10.5 | 4.34 | 127.4 | 45.90 |
| 1960 | 513,000 | 16,000 | 11,000 | 6,000 | 31.9 | 20.6 | 11.3 | 4.42 | 124.1 | 46.58 |
| 1961 | 519,000 | 17,000 | 11,000 | 6,000 | 32.3 | 20.3 | 11.9 | 4.50 | 121.0 | 47.23 |
| 1962 | 526,000 | 17,000 | 11,000 | 7,000 | 32.6 | 20.0 | 12.6 | 4.59 | 118.0 | 47.84 |
| 1963 | 533,000 | 18,000 | 10,000 | 7,000 | 32.9 | 19.7 | 13.2 | 4.65 | 115.0 | 48.48 |
| 1964 | 540,000 | 18,000 | 10,000 | 7,000 | 33.1 | 19.3 | 13.8 | 4.71 | 112.2 | 49.05 |
| 1965 | 548,000 | 18,000 | 10,000 | 8,000 | 33.5 | 18.9 | 14.5 | 4.79 | 109.4 | 49.75 |
| 1966 | 556,000 | 19,000 | 10,000 | 8,000 | 33.8 | 18.6 | 15.2 | 4.86 | 106.7 | 50.35 |
| 1967 | 564,000 | 19,000 | 10,000 | 9,000 | 34.1 | 18.3 | 15.8 | 4.92 | 104.0 | 50.89 |
| 1968 | 574,000 | 20,000 | 10,000 | 9,000 | 34.4 | 18.0 | 16.4 | 4.98 | 101.4 | 51.44 |
| 1969 | 585,000 | 20,000 | 10,000 | 10,000 | 34.7 | 17.7 | 17.1 | 5.05 | 98.8 | 51.96 |
| 1970 | 597,000 | 21,000 | 10,000 | 11,000 | 35.1 | 17.3 | 17.8 | 5.10 | 96.3 | 52.56 |
| 1971 | 610,000 | 22,000 | 10,000 | 11,000 | 35.6 | 17.0 | 18.6 | 5.16 | 93.9 | 53.07 |
| 1972 | 622,000 | 22,000 | 10,000 | 12,000 | 36.0 | 16.6 | 19.4 | 5.24 | 91.5 | 53.61 |
| 1973 | 635,000 | 23,000 | 10,000 | 13,000 | 36.3 | 16.3 | 19.9 | 5.29 | 89.2 | 54.06 |
| 1974 | 649,000 | 24,000 | 10,000 | 13,000 | 36.5 | 16.0 | 20.5 | 5.33 | 86.9 | 54.57 |
| 1975 | 663,000 | 24,000 | 10,000 | 14,000 | 36.9 | 15.7 | 21.2 | 5.39 | 84.6 | 55.04 |
| 1976 | 679,000 | 25,000 | 10,000 | 15,000 | 37.3 | 15.3 | 22.0 | 5.46 | 82.4 | 55.57 |
| 1977 | 695,000 | 26,000 | 10,000 | 16,000 | 37.7 | 15.0 | 22.7 | 5.52 | 80.3 | 56.09 |
| 1978 | 712,000 | 27,000 | 10,000 | 17,000 | 38.0 | 14.6 | 23.4 | 5.57 | 78.2 | 56.66 |
| 1979 | 730,000 | 28,000 | 10,000 | 17,000 | 38.2 | 14.3 | 23.9 | 5.61 | 76.1 | 57.05 |
| 1980 | 749,000 | 29,000 | 11,000 | 18,000 | 38.5 | 14.0 | 24.5 | 5.66 | 74.1 | 57.45 |
| 1981 | 769,000 | 30,000 | 11,000 | 19,000 | 38.9 | 13.8 | 25.1 | 5.73 | 72.2 | 57.82 |
| 1982 | 790,000 | 31,000 | 11,000 | 20,000 | 38.9 | 13.5 | 25.4 | 5.74 | 70.3 | 58.11 |
| 1983 | 811,000 | 32,000 | 11,000 | 21,000 | 39.0 | 13.2 | 25.9 | 5.76 | 68.6 | 58.60 |
| 1984 | 833,000 | 32,000 | 11,000 | 22,000 | 38.9 | 12.9 | 26.0 | 5.73 | 67.0 | 58.89 |
| 1985 | 856,000 | 33,000 | 11,000 | 22,000 | 38.8 | 12.5 | 26.3 | 5.71 | 65.5 | 59.31 |
| 1986 | 880,000 | 34,000 | 11,000 | 23,000 | 38.7 | 12.3 | 26.4 | 5.69 | 64.1 | 59.64 |
| 1987 | 905,000 | 35,000 | 11,000 | 24,000 | 38.7 | 12.0 | 26.7 | 5.67 | 62.9 | 59.89 |
| 1988 | 930,000 | 36,000 | 11,000 | 25,000 | 38.5 | 11.8 | 26.6 | 5.62 | 61.8 | 60.01 |
| 1989 | 957,000 | 36,000 | 11,000 | 25,000 | 38.1 | 11.6 | 26.5 | 5.55 | 60.8 | 60.27 |
| 1990 | 983,000 | 37,000 | 11,000 | 26,000 | 37.6 | 11.4 | 26.2 | 5.46 | 60.0 | 60.31 |
| 1991 | 1,010,000 | 38,000 | 11,000 | 26,000 | 37.2 | 11.3 | 26.0 | 5.37 | 59.3 | 60.40 |
| 1992 | 1,037,000 | 38,000 | 11,000 | 27,000 | 36.8 | 11.1 | 25.8 | 5.29 | 58.6 | 60.55 |
| 1993 | 1,065,000 | 39,000 | 12,000 | 27,000 | 36.4 | 10.9 | 25.5 | 5.19 | 58.1 | 60.72 |
| 1994 | 1,094,000 | 39,000 | 12,000 | 27,000 | 35.6 | 10.8 | 24.8 | 5.04 | 57.7 | 60.70 |
| 1995 | 1,122,000 | 39,000 | 12,000 | 27,000 | 34.8 | 10.6 | 24.2 | 4.88 | 57.3 | 60.70 |
| 1996 | 1,151,000 | 39,000 | 12,000 | 27,000 | 34.2 | 10.5 | 23.7 | 4.74 | 57.0 | 60.61 |
| 1997 | 1,180,000 | 40,000 | 12,000 | 28,000 | 34.0 | 10.4 | 23.6 | 4.66 | 56.6 | 60.66 |
| 1998 | 1,210,000 | 41,000 | 12,000 | 28,000 | 33.8 | 10.3 | 23.5 | 4.58 | 56.1 | 60.79 |
| 1999 | 1,241,000 | 42,000 | 13,000 | 29,000 | 33.5 | 10.2 | 23.3 | 4.50 | 55.4 | 60.85 |
| 2000 | 1,273,000 | 43,000 | 13,000 | 30,000 | 33.5 | 10.0 | 23.5 | 4.47 | 54.7 | 61.07 |
| 2001 | 1,307,000 | 43,000 | 13,000 | 31,000 | 33.3 | 9.8 | 23.4 | 4.42 | 53.8 | 61.27 |
| 2002 | 1,342,000 | 44,000 | 13,000 | 31,000 | 33.1 | 9.8 | 23.3 | 4.36 | 52.9 | 61.29 |
| 2003 | 1,378,000 | 45,000 | 13,000 | 32,000 | 32.9 | 9.5 | 23.3 | 4.30 | 51.8 | 61.67 |
| 2004 | 1,417,000 | 46,000 | 13,000 | 33,000 | 32.8 | 9.4 | 23.4 | 4.25 | 50.6 | 61.84 |
| 2005 | 1,458,000 | 48,000 | 14,000 | 34,000 | 32.7 | 9.3 | 23.4 | 4.21 | 49.4 | 61.96 |
| 2006 | 1,503,000 | 49,000 | 14,000 | 35,000 | 32.7 | 9.1 | 23.6 | 4.17 | 48.2 | 62.38 |
| 2007 | 1,550,000 | 50,000 | 14,000 | 37,000 | 32.7 | 8.9 | 23.8 | 4.14 | 46.8 | 62.62 |
| 2008 | 1,600,000 | 52,000 | 14,000 | 38,000 | 32.7 | 8.7 | 24.0 | 4.12 | 45.4 | 63.08 |
| 2009 | 1,654,000 | 54,000 | 14,000 | 40,000 | 33.0 | 8.6 | 24.4 | 4.14 | 43.9 | 63.30 |
| 2010 | 1,711,000 | 57,000 | 14,000 | 42,000 | 33.2 | 8.3 | 24.9 | 4.15 | 42.4 | 63.90 |
| 2011 | 1,773,000 | 59,000 | 14,000 | 44,000 | 33.2 | 8.2 | 25.0 | 4.15 | 41.0 | 64.05 |
| 2012 | 1,837,000 | 60,000 | 14,000 | 45,000 | 32.7 | 7.9 | 24.8 | 4.09 | 39.7 | 64.59 |
| 2013 | 1,902,000 | 61,000 | 15,000 | 46,000 | 32.2 | 7.8 | 24.4 | 4.02 | 38.4 | 64.78 |
| 2014 | 1,967,000 | 62,000 | 15,000 | 47,000 | 31.6 | 7.7 | 24.0 | 3.95 | 37.0 | 64.97 |
| 2015 | 2,029,000 | 63,000 | 15,000 | 48,000 | 31.0 | 7.4 | 23.6 | 3.92 | 35.6 | 65.46 |
| 2016 | 2,086,000 | 63,000 | 15,000 | 48,000 | 30.4 | 7.2 | 23.1 | 3.92 | 33.8 | 65.80 |
| 2017 | 2,140,000 | 64,000 | 15,000 | 48,000 | 29.7 | 7.1 | 22.7 | 3.91 | 32.6 | 66.19 |
| 2018 | 2,192,000 | 64,000 | 15,000 | 48,000 | 29.0 | 7.0 | 22.0 | 3.91 | 31.6 | 66.31 |
| 2019 | 2,243,000 | 64,000 | 15,000 | 48,000 | 28.4 | 6.9 | 21.5 | 3.88 | 30.9 | 66.60 |
| 2020 | 2,295,000 | 69,000 | 16,000 | 53,000 | 29.5 | 6.8 | 22.7 | 3.83 | 30.4 | 67.1 |
| 2021 | 2,350,000 | 69,000 | 16,000 | 53,000 | 28.9 | 6.8 | 22. | 3.78 | 29.4 | 67.1 |
| 2022 | 2,404,000 | 69,000 | 16,000 | 53,000 | 28.3 | 6.5 | 21.8 | 3.71 | 28.4 | 67.7 |
| 2023 | 2,458,000 | 69,000 | 16,000 | 53,000 | 27.7 | 6.3 | 21.4 | 3.65 | 27.5 | 68.3 |
| 2024 | | | | | 27.1 | 6.2 | 20.9 | 3.59 | | |
| 2025 | | | | | 26.6 | 6.2 | 20.5 | 3.54 | | |

=== Demographic and Health Surveys ===
Total Fertility Rate (TFR) (Wanted Fertility Rate) and Crude Birth Rate (CBR):

| Year | Total | | Urban | | Rural | |
| Year | CBR | TFR | CBR | TFR | CBR | TFR |
|---|---|---|---|---|---|---|
| 2000 | 33.1 | 4.3 (3.5) | 33.3 | 3.9 (3.2) | 32.4 | 5.7 (4.7) |
| 2012 | 33.3 | 4.1 (3.2) | 33.2 | 3.9 (3.0) | 33.4 | 6.1 (4.6) |
| 2019–2021 | 31.3 | 3.9 (3.2) | 31.6 | 3.8 (3.1) | 28.9 | 5.4 (4.1) |

View source data.
View source data.
View source data.
View source data.

Fertility data as of 2012 (DHS Program):

| Province | Total fertility rate | Percentage of women age 15–49 currently pregnant | Mean number of children ever born to women age 40–49 |
|---|---|---|---|
| Libreville/Port-Gentil | 3.5 | 9.3 | 4.4 |
| Estuaire (except Libreville) | 4.1 | 8.6 | 5.2 |
| Haut-Ogooué | 4.9 | 10.3 | 5.8 |
| Moyen-Ogooué | 4.9 | 8.9 | 5.4 |
| Ngounié | 5.7 | 10.9 | 6.0 |
| Nyanga | 5.7 | 10.7 | 6.2 |
| Ogooué Maritime (except Port-Gentil) | 4.8 | 9.8 | 4.6 |
| Ogooué-Ivindo | 6.7 | 14.0 | 6.6 |
| Ogooué-Lolo | 5.3 | 11.3 | 5.9 |
| Woleu-N’tem | 5.0 | 9.8 | 4.7 |

=== Life expectancy ===
| Period | Life expectancy in Years |
|---|---|
| 1950–1955 | 37.00 |
| 1955–1960 | ▲39.00 |
| 1960–1965 | ▲40.50 |
| 1965–1970 | ▲44.65 |
| 1970–1975 | ▲48.78 |
| 1975–1980 | ▲52.91 |
| 1980–1985 | ▲57.03 |
| 1985–1990 | ▲60.70 |
| 1990–1995 | ▲61.01 |
| 1995–2000 | ▼60.03 |
| 2000–2005 | ▼59.07 |
| 2005–2010 | ▲61.34 |
| 2010–2015 | ▲64.45 |

== Ethnic groups ==
Broad ethnic groups in Gabon are:

1. Bantu groups including four major groupings (Fang, Eshira, Punu, Teke)
2. Other Africans, notably 'forest people' (pygmy, now sedentary) such as the Babongo tribe

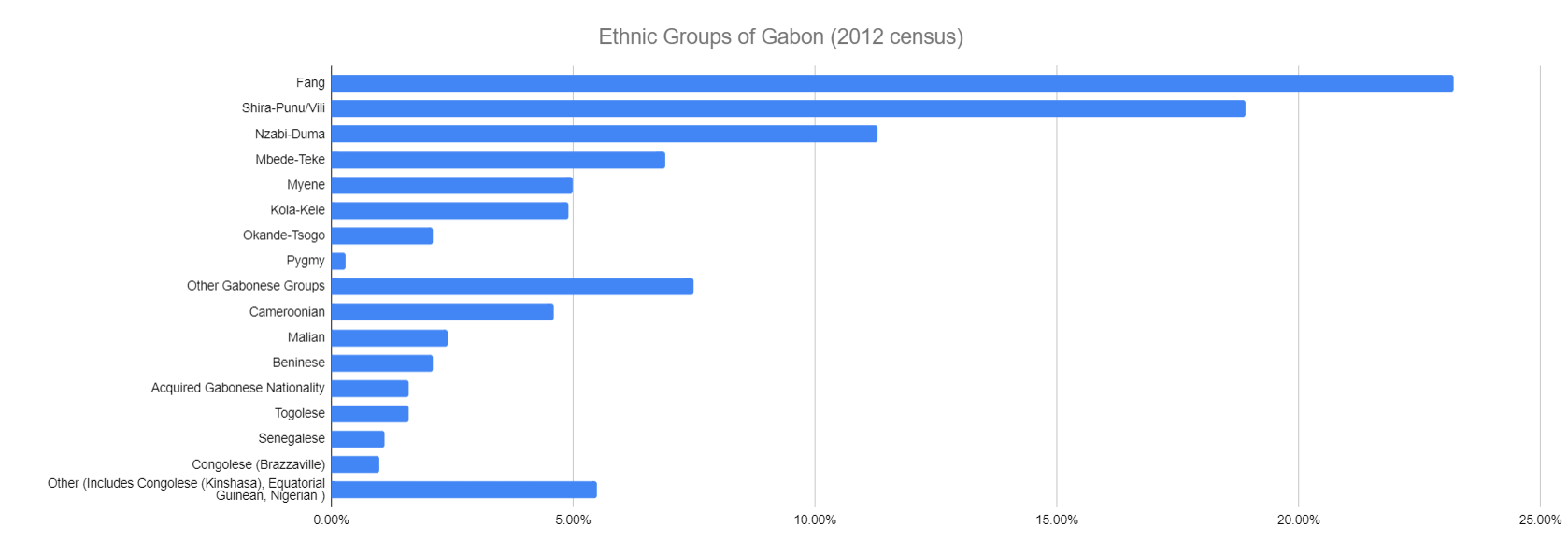

=== 2012 Census ===
| Groups | Percentage |
|---|---|
| Gabonese-born | 80.1% |
| Fang | 23.2% |
| Shira-Punu/Vili | 18.9% |
| Nzabi-Duma | 11.3% |
| Mbede-Teke | 6.9% |
| Myene | 5% |
| Kola-Kele | 4.9% |
| Okande-Tsogo | 2.1% |
| Pygmy | 0.3% |
| Other Gabonese Groups | 7.5% |
| Other | 19.9% |
| Cameroonian | 4.6% |
| Malian | 2.4% |
| Beninese | 2.1% |
| Acquired Gabonese Nationality | 1.6% |
| Togolese | 1.6% |
| Senegalese | 1.1% |
| Congolese (Brazzaville) | 1% |
| Other (Includes Congolese (Kinshasa), Equatorial Guinean, Nigerian ) | 5.5% |

== Language and religion ==
Religions include Roman Catholic 43.5%, Protestant and other Christian 36%, Muslim 10%, animist 3.3%, other 6%, and none 1.2% (2020 figures).

Languages include French (official since colonial rule), Fang, Myene, the Teke group, Punu, and Njebi.

According to research conducted in 2011 at the University of Western Cape:

It has been noted that French is increasingly be-coming the mother tongue and the initial language of the younger generations in urban Gabon (Pambou, 1998:147; Ndinga-Koumba-Binza, 2005a:72 & 2005b:141; Idiata, 2008:85; cf. Blanchon, 1994). In fact, studies by Ntong Amvame (1984), Bouché (1998), Mbondzi (1998), Ompoussa (1998), Itembo (1999) and Mouloungui Nguimbyt (2002) have shown that pupils of various ages and grades at schools learn French more efficiently than any other Gabonese language. Idiata (2008:200 & 2009:126) has also noted that some pupils do not speak any of the Gabonese native languages at all. One of the reasons for this phenomenon (i.e. French being the mother tongue of younger generations) is cross-ethnic marriages.

In fact, many couples of mixed ethnicity prefer French rather than Gabonese native languages as the code for better communication within the family. Children from a family of this kind have no choice but to acquire French as their first language. The children learn the language at home from the parents before they even get to school, therefore lessening the chances of learning any of the Gabonese native languages.

This urbanisation is also to be considered as a cause for French being the initial language of Gabonese younger generations. In fact, “in certain urban contexts there is a large degree of learning by contact at an early age” (Lafage, 1993:216).
