= Miss World 2012 =

International beauty pageant

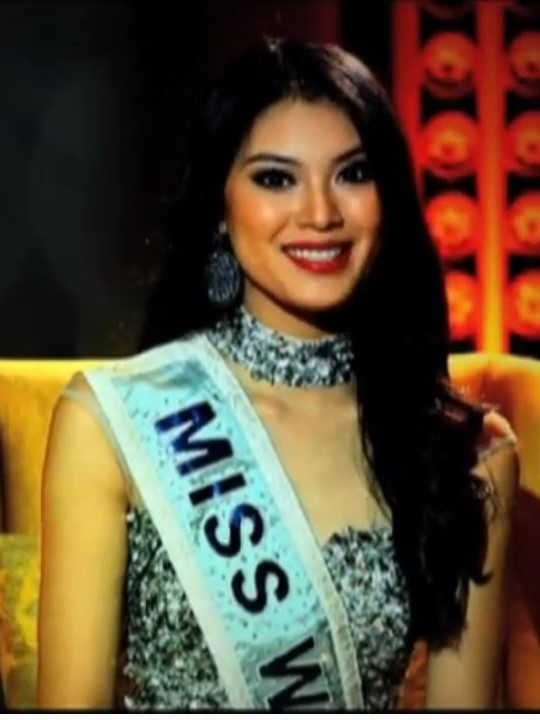
- Yu Wenxia in 2013
- Date: 18 August 2012
- Presenters: Jason Cook; Myleene Klass; Steve Douglas
- Venue: Dongsheng Fitness Center Stadium, Ordos City, Inner Mongolia, China
- Entrants: 116
- Placements: 30
- Debuts: Equatorial Guinea; Gabon; South Sudan
- Withdrawals: Cayman Islands; Egypt; Ghana; Kyrgyzstan; Liberia; Moldova; Namibia; Romania; Saint Barthélemy
- Returns: Angola; Ethiopia; Fiji; Guyana; Macau; Malawi; Saint Kitts and Nevis; Seychelles; Suriname
- Winner: Yu Wenxia; China

Miss World 2012 was the 62nd edition of the Miss World pageant, held at the Dongsheng Fitness Center Stadium in Ordos City, China, on 18 August 2012.

At the end of the event, Ivian Sarcos of Venezuela crowned Yu Wenxia of China as her successor at the end of the event. This is the second time China has won the title after Zhang Zilin in 2007. Runner-Up was Sophie Moulds representing Wales and third was Jessica Kahawaty from Australia.

== Background ==
=== Controversy ===
On 31 January 2013, the official website of Miss World Organisation released a statement regarding the scoreboard errors in the final telecast last 18 August 2012. Miss World was under siege after beauty watchers, fans and even National Directors noticed some inconsistencies in the scoring system. According to the official statement of the Ionoco Ltd., it says that the errors occurred on the graphical scoreboard were solely caused by human error on part of the operator. Miss World Organization provided the Ionoco Ltd. with verified scores, however, the operator failed to update the score table correctly resulting in a discrepancy between the position of the contestants in the scoreboard and the point values displayed.

==== Debuts, returns, and, withdrawals ====
This edition saw the debut of Equatorial Guinea, Gabon and South Sudan, and the return of Angola, Ethiopia, Fiji, Guyana, Macau, Malawi, Saint Kitts and Nevis, Seychelles and Suriname; Fiji, which last competed in 2004, Seychelles in 2008, and Angola, Ethiopia, Guyana, Macau, Malawi, Saint Kitts and Nevis and Suriname in 2010.

Cayman Islands, Egypt, Ghana, Kyrgyzstan, Liberia, Moldova, Namibia, Romania and Saint Barthélemy, withdrew from the competition.

== Results ==
=== Placements ===
Placement	Contestant
Miss World 2012	China – Yu Wenxia
1st Runner-Up	Wales – Sophie Moulds
2nd Runner-Up	Australia – Jessica Kahawaty
Top 7	Brazil – Mariana Notarangelo; India – Vanya Mishra; Jamaica – Deanna Robins; South Sudan - Atong Demach
Top 15	England – Charlotte Holmes; Indonesia – Ines Putri; Kenya – Shamim Ali; Mexico – Mariana Berumen; Netherlands – Nathalie den Dekker; Philippines – Queenierich Rehman; Spain – Aranzazu Estevez; United States – Claudine Book
Top 30	Colombia – Barbara Turbay; Denmark – Iris Thomsen; Dominican Republic – Sally Aponte; Guadeloupe – Brigitte Golabkan; Guam – Jeneva Bosko; Guatemala – Monique Aparicio; Israel – Shani Hazan; Kazakhstan – Evgenia Klishina; Nepal – Shristi Shrestha; Nigeria – Damiete Charles Granville; Northern Ireland – Tiffany Brien; Panama – Maricely Gonzalez; Portugal – Melanie Vicente; Puerto Rico – Janelee Chaparro; Sweden – Sanna Jinnedal

== Challenge Events ==
There were six challenge events. They were Beach Fashion, Beauty With a Purpose, Multimedia, Sport, Talent, and Top Model. Important points were awarded to each winner. All six winners went through to the Top 30.

=== Beach Beauty ===
Sophie Moulds of Wales won Miss World Beach Beauty 2012.

Placement	Contestant
Winner	Wales - Sophie Moulds
Top 10	Australia - Jessica Kahawaty; Brazil - Mariana Notarangelo; China - Yu Wenxia; Colombia - Bárbara Turbay; Czech Republic - Linda Bartošová; Guadeloupe - Brigitte Ramassamy Golabkan; Nepal - Shristi Shrestha; Nigeria - Damiete Charles-Granville; Northern Ireland - Tiffany Brien

=== Beauty With a Purpose ===
Vanya Mishra of India won Miss World Beauty With a Purpose 2012.

Placement	Contestant
Winner	India - Vanya Mishra
1st Runner-up	Australia - Jessica Kahawaty
2nd Runner-up	United States - Claudine Book
3rd Runner-up	Indonesia - Ines Putri
4th Runner-up	Kenya - Shamim Ali

=== Multimedia ===
Vanya Mishra of India won Miss World Multimedia 2012.

Placement	Contestant
Winner	India - Vanya Mishra
1st Runner-up	Mexico - Mariana Berumen

=== Sport ===
Sanna Jinnedal of Sweden won Miss World Sport 2012.

Placement	Contestant
Winner	Sweden - Sanna Jinnedal
Swimming	Portugal - Melanie Vicente
Long Jump	England - Charlotte Holmes
100-Meter Dash	Scotland - Nicole Treacy
Kick-Off	Sweden - Sanna Jinnedal; Uganda - Phiona Bizzu

=== Talent ===
Yu Wenxia of China won Miss World Talent 2012.

Placement	Contestant
Winner	China - Yu Wenxia
Top 5	Jamaica - Deanna Robbins; Norway - Karoline Olsen; Panama - Maricely González; Philippines - Queenierich Rehman
Top 16	Brazil - Mariana Notarangelo; Curaçao - Stephanie Rose Chang; Denmark - Iris Thomsen; Kazakhstan - Evgenia Klishina; Latvia - Anastasija Skibunova; Macau - Winnie Sin; Mongolia - Bayarmaa Huselbaatar; Paraguay - Fiorella Migliore; Saint Kitts and Nevis - Markysa O'Loughlin; Sierra Leone - Vanessa Williams; United States Virgin Islands - Taiesa Lashley

=== Top Model ===
Atong Demach of South Sudan won Miss World Top Model 2012.

Placement	Contestant
Winner	South Sudan - Atong Demach
Top 10	Australia - Jessica Kahawaty; Belize - Chantae Chanice Guy; Brazil - Mariana Notarangelo; Chile - Camila Recabarren; China - Yu Wenxia; Jamaica - Deanna Robbins; Mexico - Mariana Berumen; Poland - Weronika Szmajdzińska; Spain - Aránzazu Estevez

== Judges ==
Miss World 2012 contestants were evaluated by a panel of judges.

- Julia Morley – Chairwoman of the Miss World Organization
- Mike Dixon
- Andrew Minarik – hairstylist for the event
- Stan Reynolds
- Jodie Reynolds
- Chief Mandela
- Zhang Zilin – Miss World 2007 from China
- Jane Wang
- Alfreda Burke
- Shenjian Hong

== Contestants ==
116 contestants competed for the title.

Country/Territory	Contestant	Age (Note: Ages at the time of the pageant)	Height	Hometown
Albania	Floriana Garo	25	1.80 m (5 ft 11 in)	Durrës
Angola	Edmilza dos Santos	21	1.72 m (5 ft 7 1/2 in)	Malanje
Argentina	Josefina Herrero	18	1.78 m (5 ft 10 in)	Mercedes
Aruba	Lucianette Verhoeks	19	1.75 m (5 ft 9 in)	Oranjestad
Australia	Jessica Kahawaty	23	1.75 m (5 ft 9 in)	Sydney
Austria	Amina Dagi	17	1.73 m (5 ft 8 in)	Bregenz
Bahamas	Daronique Young	22	1.73 m (5 ft 8 in)	Nassau
Barbados	Marielle Wilkie	21	1.78 m (5 ft 10 in)	Bridgetown
Belarus	Julia Skalkovich	20	1.78 m (5 ft 10 in)	Baranovichi
Belgium	Laura Beyne	19	1.70 m (5 ft 7 in)	Brussels
Belize	Chantae Chanice Guy	20	1.75 m (5 ft 9 in)	Belmopan
Bermuda	Rochelle Minors	22	1.73 m (5 ft 8 in)	Hamilton
Bolivia	Mariana García	23	1.73 m (5 ft 8 in)	La Paz
Bonaire	Ana Gisel Maciel	19	1.68 m (5 ft 6 in)	Kralendijk
Bosnia and Herzegovina	Fikreta Husić	22	1.78 m (5 ft 10 in)	Brčko
Botswana	Tapiwa Anna-Marie Preston	19	1.74 m (5 ft 8 1/2 in)	Gaborone
Brazil	Mariana Notarangelo	22	1.76 m (5 ft 9 1/2 in)	Duque de Caxias
Bulgaria	Gabriela Vasileva	20	1.76 m (5 ft 9 1/2 in)	Byala Slatina
Canada	Tara Teng	23	1.63 m (5 ft 4 in)	Fort Langley
Chile	Camila Recabarren	21	1.80 m (5 ft 11 in)	La Serena
China	Yu Wenxia	23	1.78 m (5 ft 10 in)	Shangzhi
Colombia	Bárbara Turbay	19	1.77 m (5 ft 9 1/2 in)	Bogotá
Costa Rica	Silvana Sánchez	23	1.80 m (5 ft 11 in)	Palmares
Côte d'Ivoire	Hélène-Valerie Djouka	18	1.70 m (5 ft 7 in)	Divo
Croatia	Maja Nikolić	21	1.75 m (5 ft 9 in)	Zagreb
Curaçao	Stephanie Rose Chang	20	1.67 m (5 ft 5 1/2 in)	Willemstad
Cyprus	Georgia Georgiou	21	1.74 m (5 ft 8 1/2 in)	Limassol
Czech Republic	Linda Bartošová	19	1.71 m (5 ft 7 1/2 in)	Vraclav
Denmark	Iris Thomsen	25	1.80 m (5 ft 11 in)	Osterbro
Dominican Republic	Sally Aponte Tejada	21	1.78 m (5 ft 10 in)	Salcedo
Ecuador	Cipriana Correia	21	1.75 m (5 ft 9 in)	Esmeraldas
El Salvador	Maria Luisa Vicuña	18	1.72 m (5 ft 7 1/2 in)	Sonsonate
England	Charlotte Holmes	23	1.75 m (5 ft 9 in)	Plymouth
Equatorial Guinea	Jennifer Riveiro Ilende	20	1.79 m (5 ft 10 1/2 in)	Malabo
Ethiopia	Melkam Endale	21	1.73 m (5 ft 8 in)	Addis Ababa
Fiji	Koini Elesi Vakaloloma	24	1.73 m (5 ft 8 in)	Lautoka
Finland	Sabina Särkkä	23	1.75 m (5 ft 9 in)	Helsinki
France	Delphine Wespiser	20	1.74 m (5 ft 8 1/2 in)	Magstatt-le-Bas
Gabon	Marie-Noëlle Ada	22	1.68 m (5 ft 6 in)	Mouila
Georgia	Salome Khomeriki	20	1.77 m (5 ft 9 1/2 in)	Tbilisi
Germany	Martina Ivezaj	23	1.69 m (5 ft 6 1/2 in)	Munich
Gibraltar	Jessica Baldachino	24	1.82 m (5 ft 11 1/2 in)	Gibraltar
Greece	Maria Tsagkaraki	23	1.75 m (5 ft 9 in)	Crete
Guadeloupe	Brigitte Golabkan	18	1.73 m (5 ft 8 in)	Le Moule
Guam	Jeneva Bosko	19	1.73 m (5 ft 8 in)	Chalan Pago
Guatemala	Monique Aparicio	21	1.76 m (5 ft 9 1/2 in)	Quetzaltenango
Guyana	Arti Cameron	23	1.65 m (5 ft 5 in)	Georgetown
Honduras	Jennifer Valle	17	1.74 m (5 ft 8 1/2 in)	Santa Rosa de Copan
Hong Kong	Kelly Cheung	21	1.75 m (5 ft 9 in)	Hong Kong
Hungary	Tamara Cserháti	20	1.68 m (5 ft 6 in)	Győr
Iceland	Íris Telma Jónsdóttir	21	1.67 m (5 ft 5 1/2 in)	Reykjavík
India	Vanya Mishra	20	1.73 m (5 ft 8 in)	Jalandar
Indonesia	Ines Putri Chandra	22	1.68 m (5 ft 6 in)	Denpasar
Ireland	Rebecca Maguire	20	1.78 m (5 ft 10 in)	Dublin
Israel	Shani Hazan	19	1.82 m (5 ft 11 1/2 in)	Kiryat Ata
Italy	Jessica Bellinghieri	23	1.75 m (5 ft 9 in)	Messina
Jamaica	Deanna Robins	21	1.78 m (5 ft 10 in)	Kingston
Japan	Nozomi Igarashi	24	1.75 m (5 ft 9 in)	Yamagata
Kazakhstan	Evgeniya Klishina	25	1.75 m (5 ft 9 in)	Astana
Kenya	Shamim Nabil	18	1.70 m (5 ft 7 in)	Mombasa
Latvia	Anastasija Skibunova	23	1.75 m (5 ft 9 in)	Riga
Lebanon	Sonia-Lynn Gabriel	20	1.74 m (5 ft 8 1/2 in)	Mont-Liban
Lithuania	Rasa Vereniūtė	20	1.74 m (5 ft 8 1/2 in)	Vilnius
Macau	Winnie Sin	25	1.55 m (5 ft 1 in)	Macau
Macedonia	Aneta Stojkoska	19	1.80 m (5 ft 11 in)	Gostivar
Malawi	Susan Mtegha †	24	1.67 m (5 ft 5 1/2 in)	Mzuzu
Malaysia	Yvonne Lee	23	1.70 m (5 ft 7 in)	Kuala Lumpur
Malta	Daniela Darmanin	21	1.64 m (5 ft 4 1/2 in)	Mġarr
Martinique	Andy Govindin	23	1.72 m (5 ft 7 1/2 in)	Fort-de-France
Mauritius	Shalini Panchoo	23	1.75 m (5 ft 9 in)	Saint Pierre
Mexico	Mariana Berumen	20	1.79 m (5 ft 10 1/2 in)	Guanajuato
Mongolia	Bayarmaa Huselbaatar	20	1.78 m (5 ft 10 in)	Ulaanbaatar
Montenegro	Nikolina Lončar	19	1.81 m (5 ft 11 1/2 in)	Pljevlja
Nepal	Shristi Shrestha	23	1.75 m (5 ft 9 in)	Bharatpur
Netherlands	Nathalie den Dekker	22	1.68 m (5 ft 6 in)	Amsterdam
New Zealand	Collette Lochore	18	1.81 m (5 ft 11 1/2 in)	Auckland
Nicaragua	Lauren Lawson	24	1.70 m (5 ft 7 in)	Granada
Nigeria	Damiete Charles Granville	23	1.75 m (5 ft 9 in)	Port Harcourt
Northern Ireland	Tiffany Brien	21	1.72 m (5 ft 7 1/2 in)	Belfast
Norway	Karoline Olsen	21	1.69 m (5 ft 6 1/2 in)	Klo
Panama	Maricely González	24	1.70 m (5 ft 7 in)	Panama City
Paraguay	Fiorella Migliore	23	1.68 m (5 ft 6 in)	Asunción
Peru	Giuliana Zevallos	23	1.80 m (5 ft 11 in)	Lima
Philippines	Queenierich Rehman	24	1.76 m (5 ft 9 1/2 in)	Las Piñas
Poland	Weronika Szmajdzińska	18	1.74 m (5 ft 8 1/2 in)	Szczecin
Portugal	Melanie Vicente	21	1.70 m (5 ft 7 in)	Torres Vedras
Puerto Rico	Janelee Chaparro	20	1.70 m (5 ft 7 in)	Barceloneta
Russia	Elizaveta Golovanova	19	1.78 m (5 ft 10 in)	Safonovo
Saint Kitts and Nevis	Markysa O'Loughlin	20	1.68 m (5 ft 6 in)	Basseterre
Scotland	Nicole Treacy	23	1.73 m (5 ft 8 in)	Paisley
Serbia	Bojana Lečić	22	1.81 m (5 ft 11 1/2 in)	Nova Varoš
Seychelles	Sherlyn Ferneau	21	1.79 m (5 ft 10 1/2 in)	Victoria
Sierra Leone	Vanessa Williams	22	1.68 m (5 ft 6 in)	Freetown
Singapore	Karisa Sukamto	19	1.60 m (5 ft 3 in)	Singapore
Slovakia	Kristína Krajčírová	20	1.75 m (5 ft 9 in)	Bratislava
Slovenia	Nives Orešnik	20	1.73 m (5 ft 8 in)	Maribor
South Africa	Remona Moodley	23	1.72 m (5 ft 7 1/2 in)	Cape Town
South Korea (Note: Competed as Korea in the pageant)	Kim Sung-min	23	1.72 m (5 ft 7 1/2 in)	Seoul
South Sudan	Atong Demach	24	1.80 m (5 ft 11 in)	Bor
Spain	Aránzazu Estévez	23	1.81 m (5 ft 11 1/2 in)	Las Palmas
Sri Lanka	Sumudu Prasadini	23	1.78 m (5 ft 10 in)	Kurunegala
Suriname	Stefanie Grace Gentle	22	1.73 m (5 ft 8 in)	Nieuw Nickerie
Sweden	Sanna Jinnedal	19	1.80 m (5 ft 11 in)	Borås
Tanzania	Lisa Jensen	24	1.77 m (5 ft 9 1/2 in)	Dar es Salaam
Thailand	Vanessa Herrmann	21	1.75 m (5 ft 9 in)	Phuket
Trinidad and Tobago	Athaliah Samuel	24	1.78 m (5 ft 10 in)	Port of Spain
Turkey	Açelya Samyeli Danoğlu	20	1.85 m (6 ft 1 in)	Istanbul
Uganda	Phiona Bizzu	19	1.73 m (5 ft 8 in)	Lira
Ukraine	Karina Zhyronkina	20	1.76 m (5 ft 9 1/2 in)	Kharkiv
United States	Claudine Book	20	1.73 m (5 ft 8 in)	California
United States Virgin Islands	Taiesa Lashley	24	1.63 m (5 ft 4 in)	Saint Thomas
Uruguay	Valentina Henderson	18	1.79 m (5 ft 10 1/2 in)	Salto
Venezuela	Gabriella Ferrari	21	1.76 m (5 ft 9 1/2 in)	Valencia
Vietnam	Vũ Thị Hoàng My	23	1.73 m (5 ft 8 in)	Đồng Nai
Wales	Sophie Moulds	19	1.79 m (5 ft 10 1/2 in)	Ferndale
Zimbabwe	Bongani Dlakama	24	1.74 m (5 ft 8 1/2 in)	Bulawayo

== Venues ==
The primary site for the competition was Ordos in Inner Mongolia, China. A fashion show was held in Shanghai, and the beachwear competitions were held at the desert resort of Xiangshawan.

== International broadcasters ==
- Afghanistan: Star World
- Angola: TPA
- Anguilla: Direct TV
- Antigua and Barbuda: Direct TV
- Argentina: Direct TV
- Armenia: Armenia TV
- Aruba: Direct TV
- Australia: FOXTEL-E!
- Bahamas: ZNS
- Bangladesh: SRK showtime
- Barbados: Direct TV
- Belarus: ONT
- Belgium: STAR!
- Belize: Channel 5
- Bermuda: Direct TV
- Bolivia: Unitel
- Bonaire: Direct TV
- Bosnia and Herzegovina: RTRS, FTV
- Botswana: BTV
- Brazil: UOL
- British Virgin Islands: Direct TV
- Brunei: Star World
- Cambodia: Star World
- Canada: E!
- Cayman Islands: Direct TV
- Chile: Canal 13
- China: CCTV 2
- Colombia: Canal 1
- Curaçao: TDS
- Cyprus: Sigma TV
- Denmark: STAR! & TNT
- Dominica: Direct TV
- Dominican Republic: Direct TV
- Ecuador: Direct TV
- Egypt: Dalycartoon
- El Salvador: Canal 2
- England: DRG TV
- Estonia: STAR!
- Fiji: Fiji Broadcast Corporation
- Finland: STAR!
- France: Paris Premiere
- Georgia: Telemedia
- Germany: E!
- Ghana: GBC
- Grenada: Direct TV
- Guadeloupe: Paris Premiere
- Guatemala: Canal 11
- Haiti: Direct TV
- Honduras: Telesistema
- Hong Kong: Star World
- Israel: STAR!
- India: Zee Cafe
- Indonesia: RCTI
- Iran: Manoto
- Ireland: E! Entertainment
- Italy: E!
- Jamaica: TVJ
- Japan: Star World
- Kenya: Royal Media Services Ltd.
- Laos: Star World
- Latvia: STAR!
- Lebanon: LBCI
- Lithuania: Lietuvos rytas TV
- Luxembourg: STAR!
- Macau: Star World
- Macedonia: Sitel
- Malaysia: Star World
- Maldives: Star World
- Montserrat: Direct TV
- Martinique: Paris Premiere
- Mauritius: MBC
- Mexico: Galavision
- Micronesia: Star World
- Mongolia: UBS TV
- Mozambique: STV
- Myanmar: Star World
- Namibia: NBC
- Nauru: Star World
- Netherlands: STAR!
- New Caledonia: Star World
- Nicaragua: Canal 2
- Nigeria: Silverbird
- New Zealand: TV2
- Northern Ireland: DRG TV
- Norway: STAR!
- Pacific Islands: Star World
- Palau: Star World
- Panama: Telemetro
- Papua New Guinea: Star World
- Paraguay: La Tele
- Peru: Direct TV
- Philippines: TV5
- Poland: Polsat
- Portugal: Sic Internacional
- Puerto Rico: Puerto Rico TV
- Russia: Star World
- Saba: Direct TV
- Saint Kitts and Nevis: Direct TV
- Saint Eustasius: Direct TV
- Saint Lucia: Direct TV
- Saint Martin: Direct TV
- Saint Vincent and the Grenadines: Direct TV
- Scotland: DRG TV
- Seychelles: SBC
- Singapore: MediaCorp Channel 5
- Solomon Islands: Star World
- South Africa: SABC 3
- South Korea: T Cast
- Spain: Mediaset España
- Swaziland: Swazi TV
- Sweden: STAR!
- Taiwan: Star World
- Thailand: Channel 3
- Trinidad and Tobago: CTV
- Turkey: CNBC-e
- Turks and Caicos Islands: Direct TV
- Uruguay: Direct TV
- United States: E! Entertainment, Xbox Live (via Xfinity video on demand application)
- United States Virgin Islands: Direct TV
- Vanuatu: Star World
- Venezuela: Venevisión
- Vietnam: VTV
- Wales: DRG TV
- Zambia: ZNBC
- Zimbabwe: ZBC
