= Miss Universe Canada 2017 =

- Date: October 7, 2017
- Presenters: Sonny Borrelli; Chelsae Durocher
- Venue: John Bassett Theatre, Metro Toronto Convention Centre, Toronto, Ontario
- Entrants: 67
- Placements: 20
- Winner: Lauren Howe; Ontario Province
- Congeniality: Chanelle Preradovich; Lower Canada
- Photogenic: Lauren Howe; Ontario Province

Miss Universe Canada 2017, the 15th Miss Universe Canada pageant, was held on October 7, 2017 at John Bassett Theatre, Metro Toronto Convention Centre, Toronto, Ontario. Siera Bearchell of Saskatchewan Province crowned Lauren Howe of Ontario Province at the end of the event. Lauren represented Canada in the Miss Universe 2017 pageant on November 26, 2017, placing in the top 10.

== Results ==
=== Placements ===
Placement	Contestant	International placement
Miss Universe Canada 2017	Ontario – Lauren Howe	Top 10 – Miss Universe 2017
1st Runner-Up	Upper Canada – Marta Stępień	Unplaced – Miss International 2017
2nd Runner-Up	Central Ottawa – Meral Özerdinç	
3rd Runner-Up	Calgary – Diana Lai	
4th Runner-Up	Alberta – Kathryn Kohut	
Top 10	British Columbia – Natasha Smith; Lower Canada – Chanelle Preradovich; Southwest Ontario – Sasha Lombardi; Vancouver – Justine Felizarta; Windsor – Serafina Oliverio	
Top 20	East Canada – Zorica Bruic; Fort McMurray – Vanessa Chauhan; Montreal – Andy Rahi; Northwest Ontario – Tammy Lynn Ghawi; Quebec – Jennifer Daou; South Toronto – Caitlyn Green; Upper Alberta – Samantha Fraughton; Waterloo – Xinying Zhang; West Canada – Shanelle Conell; West Ottawa – Gabriela Vallejo	

=== Special awards ===
Award	Contestant
Miss Congeniality	Ontario Province – Lauren Howe
Miss Photogenic	Lower Canada – Chanelle Preradovich

== Official Delegates ==
Meet the national delegates competing for the title of Miss Universe Canada 2017:

Represents	Contestant	Age	Height	Hometown
Alberta Province	Kathryn Kohut	23	5 ft 7 in (170 cm)	Wetaskiwin
(Ontario) Aurora	Amanda Diflorio	21	5 ft 5 in (165 cm)	Aurora
(Ontario) Belleville	Stephanie Philbin	27	5 ft 5 in (165 cm)	Belleville
British Columbia Province	Natasha Smith	19	5 ft 5 in (165 cm)	Coquitlam
(Ontario) Burlington	Katherine Jarzecki	27	5 ft 5 in (165 cm)	Burlington
Calgary	Diana Lai	19	5 ft 10 in (178 cm)	Calgary
Central Canada	Melissa Knight	21	5 ft 9 in (175 cm)	Ajax
Central Ontario	Stephanie Ajodhar	25	5 ft 6 in (168 cm)	Toronto
Central Ottawa	Meral Özerdinç	25	5 ft 7 in (170 cm)	Ottawa
Central Quebec	Shany Bolte	24	5 ft 7 in (170 cm)	Montreal
Central Toronto	Emma Pearson	25	5 ft 10 in (178 cm)	Toronto
East Canada	Zorica Bruic	26	6 ft 0 in (183 cm)	Windsor
East Ontario	Melissa Montaleone	19	5 ft 7 in (170 cm)	Windsor
East Ottawa	Laura Cavé	18	5 ft 8 in (173 cm)	Ottawa
East Quebec	Alexandra Beaulieu	22	5 ft 1.5 in (156.2 cm)	Quebec City
East Toronto	Cara Castelli	21	5 ft 8 in (173 cm)	Toronto
(Ontario) Etobicoke	Harleen Malhans	18	5 ft 8 in (173 cm)	Etobicoke
(Alberta) Fort McMurray	Vanessa Chauhan	24	5 ft 6 in (168 cm)	Fort McMurray
Guelph	Kim Rivera	24	5 ft 8 in (173 cm)	Guelph
Hamilton	Kaylee Shallow	18	5 ft 9 in (175 cm)	Hamilton
(Ontario) Kanata	Sarah Perry	22	5 ft 7 in (170 cm)	Kanata
(Ontario) Lindsay	Chealse Howell	20	5 ft 9 in (175 cm)	Lindsay
(Ontario) London	Jackie Wojciechowski	19	5 ft 8 in (173 cm)	London
Lower Alberta	Kansas King	18	5 ft 6 in (168 cm)	Airdrie
Lower Canada	Chanelle Preradovich	20	5 ft 10 in (178 cm)	Burlington
(Ontario) Markham	Jasmine Mughal	26	5 ft 11 in (180 cm)	Markham
(Ontario) Mississauga	Regine Semira	26	5 ft 7 in (170 cm)	Mississauga
(British Columbia) Moberly Lake	Augustina Caron	20	5 ft 4 in (163 cm)	Moberly Lake
Montreal	Andy Rahi	18	5 ft 6 in (168 cm)	Montreal
National Capital Region	Patricia Chartrand	21	5 ft 6 in (168 cm)	Ottawa
North Ontario	Leily Figueroa	22	5 ft 10 in (178 cm)	Toronto
North Ottawa	Erin Chapman	22	5 ft 10 in (178 cm)	Ottawa
North Quebec	Nadia Lavoie	24	5 ft 8 in (173 cm)	Chicoutimi
North Toronto	Alicia Kuszelewski	22	5 ft 5 in (165 cm)	Toronto
Northeast Ontario	Sheila Amri	22	5 ft 8 in (173 cm)	London
Northeast Toronto	Heidi Gawad	22	5 ft 5 in (165 cm)	Toronto
Northwest Ontario	Tammy Lynn Ghawi	19	5 ft 7 in (170 cm)	Mississauga
Northwest Toronto	Jacqueline Verellen	22	5 ft 7 in (170 cm)	Toronto
Nova Scotia Province	Rachel Miller	19	5 ft 10 in (178 cm)	Sackville
Ontario Province	Lauren Howe	24	5 ft 9 in (175 cm)	Toronto
(British Columbia) Pacific Coast	Mina Khtaria	22	5 ft 9 in (175 cm)	Vancouver
Prince George	Emmersun Taylor-Ouellet	19	5 ft 10 in (178 cm)	Prince George
Quebec Province	Jennifer Daou	19	5 ft 9 in (175 cm)	Laval
(British Columbia) Richmond	Natalia Lora	18	5 ft 4 in (163 cm)	Richmond
(Ontario) Scarborough	Jenay Maynard	25	5 ft 9 in (175 cm)	Scarborough
South Canada	Victoria Deng	22	5 ft 5 in (165 cm)	Markham
South Ontario	Lola Dan	24	5 ft 7 in (170 cm)	Toronto
South Ottawa	Kaylee Sheppard	24	5 ft 7 in (170 cm)	Ottawa
South Quebec	Amély Poulin	19	5 ft 3 in (160 cm)	East Angus
South Toronto	Caitlin Green	24	5 ft 8 in (173 cm)	Toronto
Southeast Ontario	Olga Kichygina	24	5 ft 7 in (170 cm)	Toronto
Southeast Toronto	Katherine Highgate	18	5 ft 7 in (170 cm)	Toronto
Southwest Ontario	Sasha Lombardi	20	5 ft 8 in (173 cm)	Toronto
(Alberta) Strathmore	Victoria Wilke	21	5 ft 10 in (178 cm)	Strathmore
Sudbury	Chelsey Pitfield	18	5 ft 5 in (165 cm)	Sudbury
(Alberta) The Rockies	Birkley Doll	20	5 ft 6 in (168 cm)	Calgary
Upper Alberta	Samantha Fraughton	24	5 ft 8 in (173 cm)	Fort Saskatchewan
Upper Canada	Marta Stępień	23	5 ft 10 in (178 cm)	Windsor
Vancouver	Justine Felizarta	23	5 ft 9 in (175 cm)	Vancouver
(Ontario) Waterloo	Xinxin Zhang	24	5 ft 7 in (170 cm)	Waterloo
West Canada	Shanelle Connell	21	5 ft 3 in (160 cm)	Kelowna
(British Columbia) West Coast	Jessica Bailey	21	6 ft 0 in (183 cm)	Langley
West Ontario	Maggie McTavish	26	5 ft 8 in (173 cm)	Toronto
West Ottawa	Gabriela Vallejo	21	5 ft 7 in (170 cm)	Ottawa
West Quebec	Amanda Casavant	23	5 ft 7 in (170 cm)	Laval
(Ontario) West Toronto	Eliane Johnson	23	5 ft 7 in (170 cm)	Toronto
(Ontario) Windsor	Serafina Oliverio	19	5 ft 10 in (178 cm)	Windsor
(Ontario) York	Keleigh McCall	23	5 ft 9 in (175 cm)	Toronto

== Crossovers and Returnees ==
Contestants who previously competed in the previous editions of Miss Universe Canada, in other local beauty pageants or in international reality modeling competition.:

Miss Universe Canada

- 2013: Katherine Highgate
- 2016: Katherine Jarzecki
- 2013: Kathryn Kohut
- 2015: Kathryn Kohut (2nd Runner-up)
- 2014: Lauren Howe (2nd Runner-up)
- 2012: Mina Khtaria
- 2014: Mina Khtaria
- 2015: Vanessa Chauhan
- 2016: Vanessa Chauhan (Top 20)
- 2016: Sasha Lombardi
- 2018: Marta Stepien (Winner)

Miss World Canada

- 2014: Kaylee Sheppard
- 2017: Rachel Miller

Miss Earth Canada

- 2013: Regina Semira
- 2014: Kaylee Shallow

Binibining Pilipinas

- 2015: Justine Beatrice Felizarta (Top 15)
- 2021: Justine Beatrice Felizarta (TBA)

Mutya ng Pilipinas

- 2012: Regina Semira

Miss Haiti

- 2019: Gabriela Clesca Vallejo (Winner)

Miss Supranational

- 2014: Gabriela Clesca Vallejo (Top 20)

Miss Grand International

- 2014: Kathryn Kohut (2nd Runner-up)
- 2014: Kaylee Shallow (represented St. Vincent & the Grenadines)
