= Desir =

Desir or Désir may refer to:

== People ==
- Christie Desir (born 1993), Haitian-American beauty queen, model and actress
- Harlem Désir, French politician
- Jean-Claude Désir (born 1946), Haitian football player
- Pierre Desir (born 1990), Haitian-American football cornerback

== Places ==
- Saint-Désir, France

== Other ==
- Désir, song by Garnidelia
