= Gallo-Roman Theater of Lisieux =

Ancient Roman entertainment structure

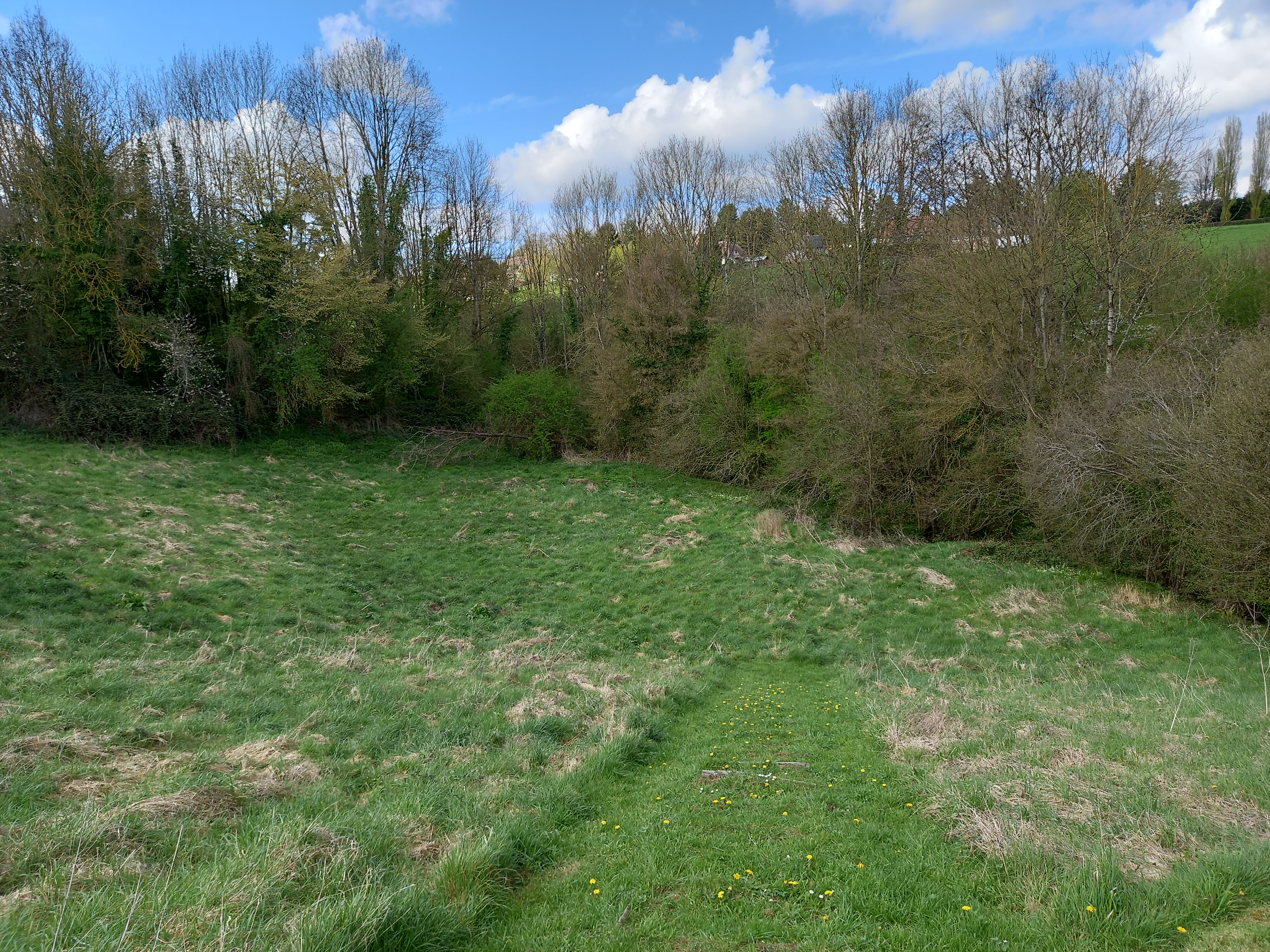
- The cavea descending towards the orchestra in 2022.
- Interactive map of Gallo-Roman Theater of Lisieux
- Location: Saint-Désir, Calvados, France
- Coordinates: 49°08′53″N 0°12′15″E
- Opening date: 2nd century
- Dedicated to: Ancient Rome civilization
- Classified as Historical Monument (1984)

The Gallo-Roman theater of Lisieux is an ancient Roman entertainment structure dating back to the 2nd century. It is situated in the commune of Saint-Désir, near Lisieux in the French department of Calvados, in the Normandy region.

Ruins in the current commune were first observed in the late 17th century and initially believed to be the original location of the Roman city of Noviomagus Lexoviorum. However, recent research indicates that these ruins represent a peripheral district surrounding a sanctuary, similar to other sites such as Gisacum in the Eure department.

Discovered in the early 19th century, the theater has not undergone extensive excavation and remains largely unexplored as of the early 21st century. However, most of the ancient site has been acquired by the hosting commune, which has protected it since the 1980s when the building was classified as a historical monument, and efforts to preserve and enhance it have been initiated.

Despite limited research on the building, it is classified as a theater with an arena capable of hosting various spectacles, a common type in Roman Gaul. The exact date of abandonment is unknown, but evidence suggests possible destruction by fire, as indicated by layers of destruction observed in the 19th century by Arcisse de Caumont, who noted that the monument was at least partially constructed of wood. The building also uses the site's topography, with a stream between the orchestra and the stage wall. The presence of such a structure in the capital of Lexovia signifies the Romanization of this region of Gaule Lyonnaise.

== Location ==
=== Ancient location ===
Antique site of Lisieux.

The Castellier oppidum, which covers an area of 200 hectares, is situated 3 kilometers southwest of Lisieux and probably functioned as the administrative hub of the Lexovii territory, serving various purposes such as artisanal, commercial, and potentially religious activities. Discoveries in the 19th century uncovered a murus gallicus.

The city's history during the Roman Empire is largely unknown due to the limited number of archaeological discoveries and the varying topographical conditions of the Touques and Orbiquet rivers. The lack of information about the ancient city's buildings, including the forum and other public structures, further complicates the understanding of its past.

The site of the ancient city is extensive. Investigations after the destruction of the World War II revealed a configuration that was more or less urbanized, "depending on the terrain layout and salubrity". The theater-amphitheater site is located to the east of a vast complex, of which it is the only remaining vestige with "significant structures".

=== Current location ===
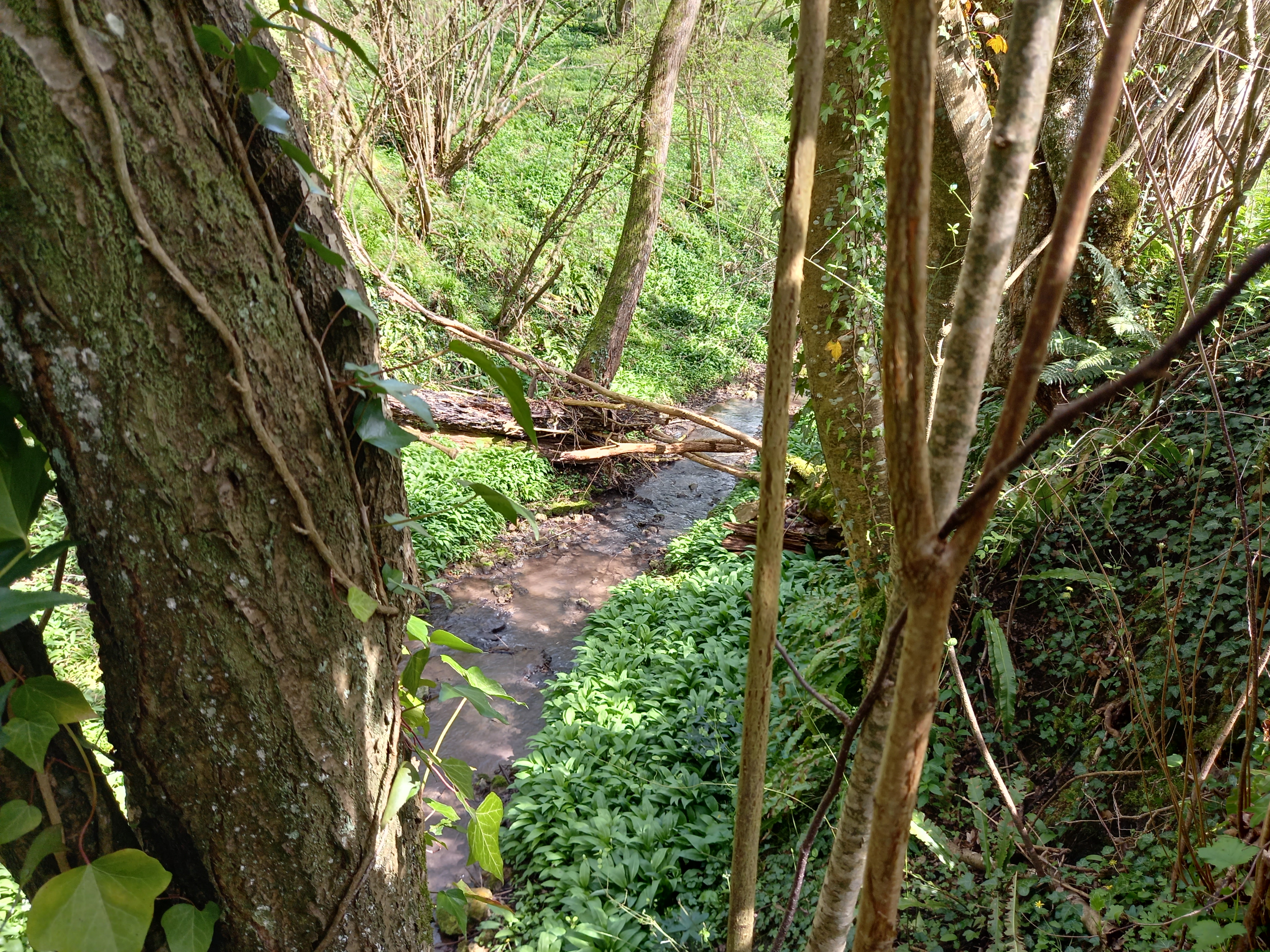
View of the Merderet stream behind the theater's cavea.

The theater is located northwest of present-day Lisieux, along the route to Pré d'Auge, (Note: Collectif 2001, p. 1073) at a place called Les Belles Croix in 1911, now known as La Couture. It is approximately 1,800 meters west of Lisieux's city center, (Note: On cadastral sheet C, plots 401, 402, 403 from 1911, or plots 139, 140, 143 to 145 from 1984. Current plot 26.) (Note: Lantier 1911, p. 332) between the Merderet stream (sometimes confused with the Tourette) and the departmental road D45.

In 1985, the Belles-Croix plots were owned by the Saint-Désir commune, while the left bank of the Douet Merderet remained in private ownership.

== Historical context ==
=== Ancient and medieval history ===
Lisieux, formerly known as Noviomagus Lexoviorum during Roman times, served as the capital of the Lexovii people. The remains of the city, including civil and religious structures, are believed to originate from the 3rd century.

The site known as Vieux-Lisieux is identified as a sanctuary rather than a settlement, as evidenced by Claude Lemaître's research in the 1980s. This extensive rural sanctuary, comparable to sites like Sanxay, Drevant, Vieil-Évreux, or Berthouville, dates back to the Gaulish era. The scale of the site has led Patrice Lajoye to propose that it was not just a sanctuary but a complex with streets and neighborhoods. Pierre Jeanjean views the area as that of an ancient town, stretching one kilometer in length and 800 meters in width. The Vieux-Lisieux site includes a large structure surrounded by porticos, a theater, an aqueduct, a masonry pile, a promontory overlooking the Merderet stream, and streets measuring 10 to 15 meters wide. Some artifacts discovered at Vieux-Lisieux bear resemblance to features identified as hostels in Sanxay and are too substantial to be residential components.

The history and evolution of the building in antiquity are difficult to specify due to the lack of excavations. Located 1,800 meters west of the modern city, the entertainment building was constructed in the 2nd century or the 2nd–3rd century. (Note: Sear 2006, p. 241) It is a mixed type, common in Roman Gaul, functioning as a theater and an amphitheater. (Note: Deniaux et al. 2002, p. 113) The shows included gladiatorial games, theater, and indigenous religious festivals. Combats between gladiators and animals could take place in the orchestra. One of the two aqueducts identified in Noviomagus by François Cottin was located northwest of the Lisieux city, in Saint-Désir.

A ceramic shard dating back to the 2nd century was found in the building's mortar, suggesting that the city "experienced significant monumentation" during that time. The wooden components of the building probably succumbed to fire, as noted by Arcisse de Caumont who observed a layer of charcoal and "black earth". (Note: de Caumont 1838, p. 444) The city appears to have been impacted by destruction around the mid-2nd half of the 3rd century, as indicated by François Cottin. It is possible that the entertainment building was reconstructed after these events.

In modern times, the stream that flows through the building was redirected in the past and had a higher flow rate. (Note: Lantier 1911, p. 334) Pierre Jeanjean, citing Abbé Simon's writings, observed that the path of this stream aligned with ancient entrances that led to the seating areas through "two fairly long vaulted corridors." In the 12th century, a farm was constructed using materials salvaged from the theater's stage wall.

=== Rediscovery and identification of the site since the 18th century ===
The site was discovered in 1770 by engineer Hubert, who conducted some surveys (Note: Delacampagne 1990, pp. 98–100) but did not fully grasp its significance. While working on the section of the current departmental road 613 between Lisieux and Caen, (Note: Lantier 1911, p. 333) Hubert was looking for fill material when locals informed him about the abundance of cut stones. During the roadwork, he stumbled upon vaulted arcades, wide streets measuring 10 to 15 meters, and several buildings, leading him to create a floor plan of the site. Numerous architectural fragments and coins dating back to the reigns of Vespasian, Titus, Trajan, Marcus Aurelius, Commodus, and Constantine were unearthed. Hubert collected 4,000 cubic meters of materials, but his report was overlooked until 1802.

In the 17th century, Nicolas-Claude Fabri de Peiresc visited the site, where locals reported the presence of "old, ancient ruins".

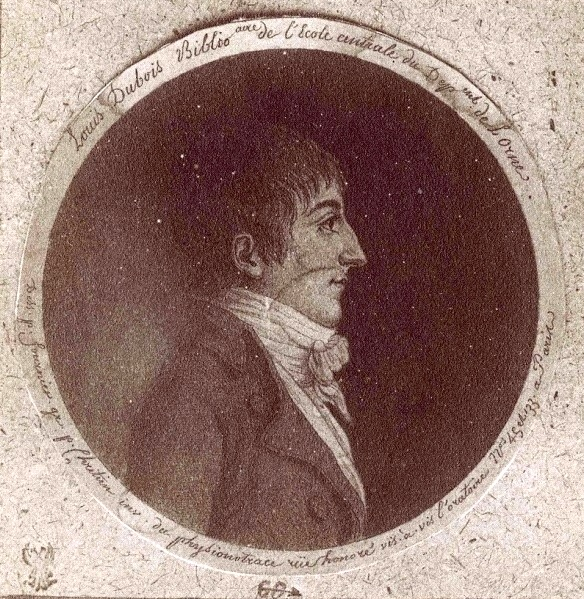
Louis Du Bois (1773–1855); portrait (physionotrace) of Fournier and Chrétien.

On 18 May 1818, Louis Du Bois rediscovered the remains of the building. He was the first to identify it. François Cottin noted that no one at that time attempted to date the construction. Excavations under his direction took place in 1820. Arcisse de Caumont, to whom Du Bois reported the building, (Note: de Caumont 1838, p. 442) attributed it to the form of an amphitheater. (Note: Delacampagne 1990, p. 100) He did not consider it implausible that the building could have hosted naumachiae. (Note: de Caumont 1838, pp. 444–445) The Society of Antiquaries of Normandy allocated funds for excavating the building. However, these excavations did not take place due to the difficult handling of the soil and the cost of compensating farmers for depositing the spoil "on high-yield grassy plots". (Note: de Caumont 1838, p. 445)

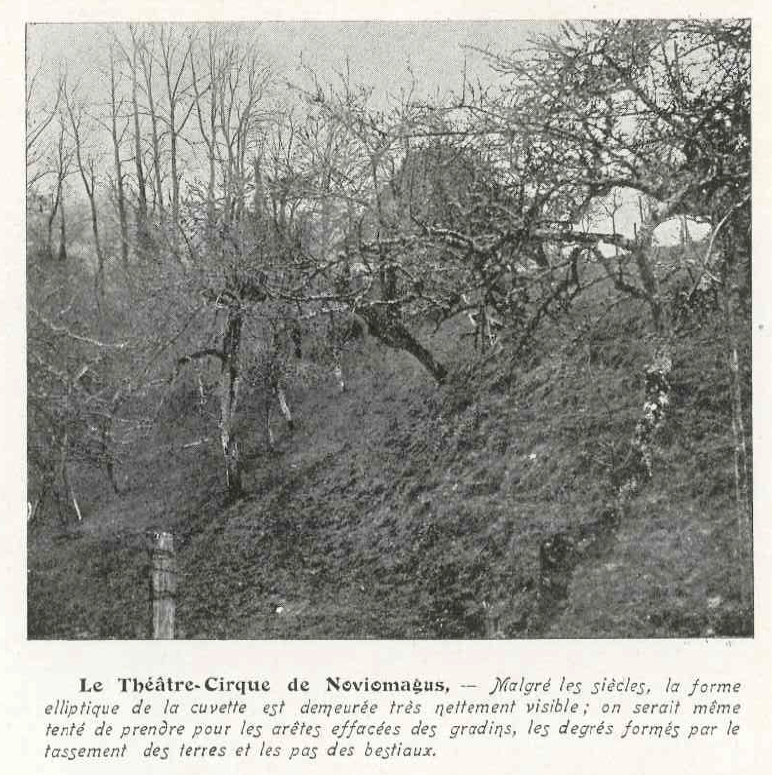
View of the site at the beginning of the 20th century.

The theater site was abandoned. In 1874, Alexandre and Henri Moisy conducted a second investigation of the site, but the uncovered remains did not permit the creation of a comprehensive floor plan.

At the beginning of the 20th century, the site was covered with grass and apple trees and a contour plan was drawn. Later, the site was abandoned, and a house was constructed on it. This house was "partly built on ancient masonry" and incorporated "long, flat, typically Roman bricks" in its walls.

The site has never undergone scientific excavations; only a few "unpublished surveys have been conducted", particularly around 1927–1928 by Abbé Simon, former president of the Historical Society of Lisieux. One of the owners discovered columns in situ.

Apple trees were noted on the site in the early 1970s, and the area was covered with grass or plants in the early 1980s. In 1979, the municipality of Saint-Désir acquired the Gallo-Roman theater site, which was listed as a historic monument on 21 December 1984. Restoration work was carried out by a volunteer association between 1984 and 1985 on the residential buildings dated to the 18th and 19th centuries. In July 1984, a music festival was held on the site, prompting consideration of potential excavations. However, the buried remains were not at risk of destruction, and research could damage the protected structure, with the exposed walls potentially being destroyed by exposure to the elements. Furthermore, the site is threatened by "regular visits from looters equipped with metal detectors", and in 1995, a volleyball court was even considered over the remains.

== Description ==
=== Unknown site ===
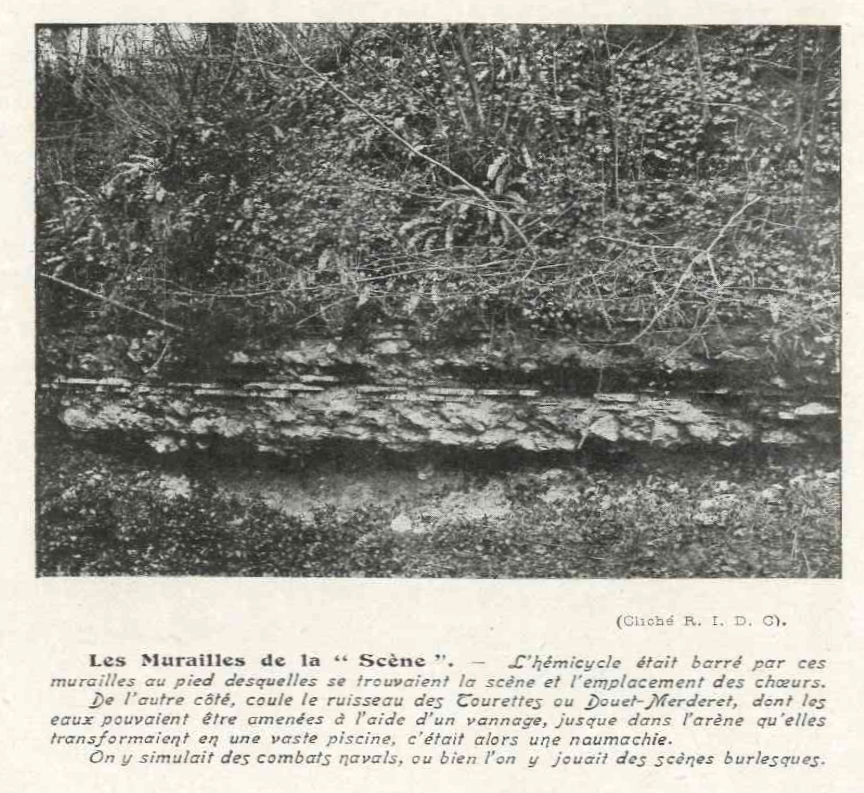
View of the stage wall in an old photograph.

The theater was situated within a complex of Gallo-Roman constructions that spanned both sides of the Pré-d'Auge road. These sites, including Tourettes, Fénèbres, and Couture, were unearthed during the 19th century. Louis Du Bois initially classified the site as a "classical" theater, while Arcisse de Caumont interpreted it as a mixed theater that could accommodate theatrical performances and events requiring an arena.

The precise dimensions of the site remain uncertain due to the absence of archaeological excavations. In the 1980s, small masonry walls with brick courses were observed on the right bank of the Merderet stream.

The architectural form of the building is shaped by the natural topography of the surrounding area, which was integrated into the construction process. In Roman Gaul, theaters frequently incorporated natural elements into their design. (Note: Deniaux et al. 2002, p. 111) The building still retains a considerable "portion of its original volume", and there is potential for "significant substructures to be uncovered".

=== General configuration ===
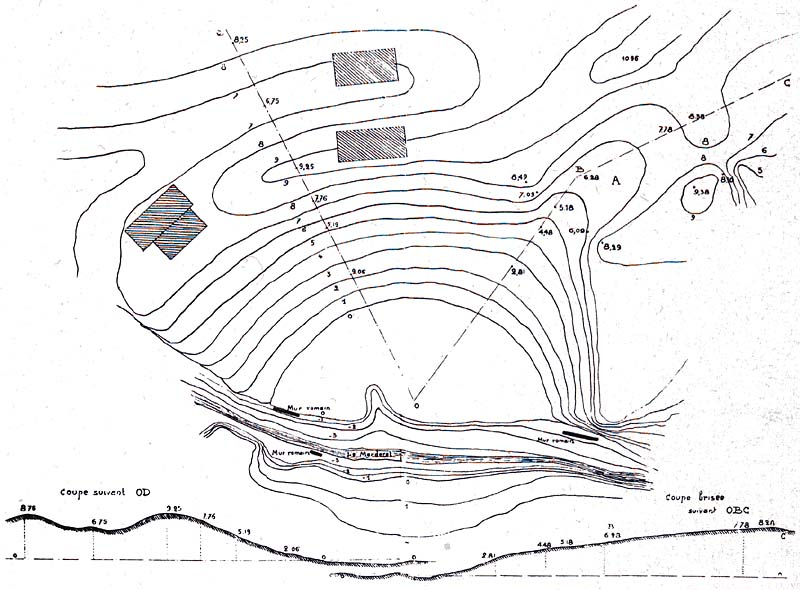
Contour plan of the Gallo-Roman theater in Vieux-Lisieux (north down).

The architectural designs of Gallo-Roman theatres varied, and their construction was "relatively economical," relying on local resources. Patrons could procure all the necessary elements for constructing such an entertainment building.

The cavea is elliptical and exhibits a discernible slope. The upper portion, summa cavea, would have featured two walls for circulation, following the shape of the building. Radiating walls were probably present within the cavea.

The building is situated at the base of the valley, in proximity to the Merderet stream. The semicircular seating areas and supporting structures are situated on the hillside, while the stage and related structures are located on the opposite side of the stream, near the remnants of an ancient structure.

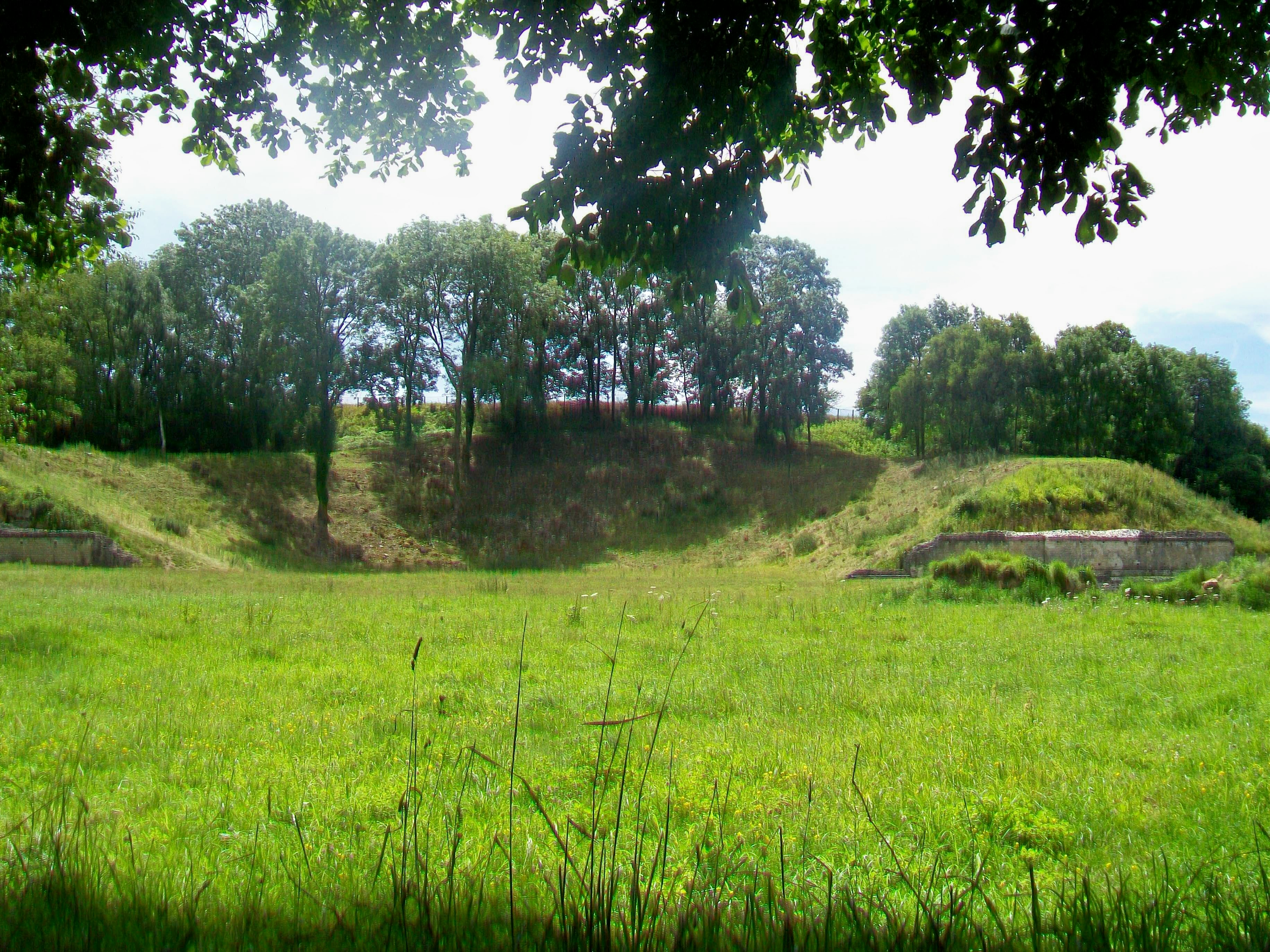
General view of the Genainville theater site.

Seating was assigned according to a "meticulous protocol," with the front rows reserved for priests, magistrates, and citizens, with specific spaces reserved for women and slaves. Early 20th-century surveys indicated that seating was located beneath 0.30–0.35 meters of topsoil. Surveys in the orchestra at the same time did not find masonry traces. The specific material of the seating is uncertain, although, in theatres linked to sanctuaries, the seating was often "simply a grassy earth slope." Stone seating has been found at Genainville.

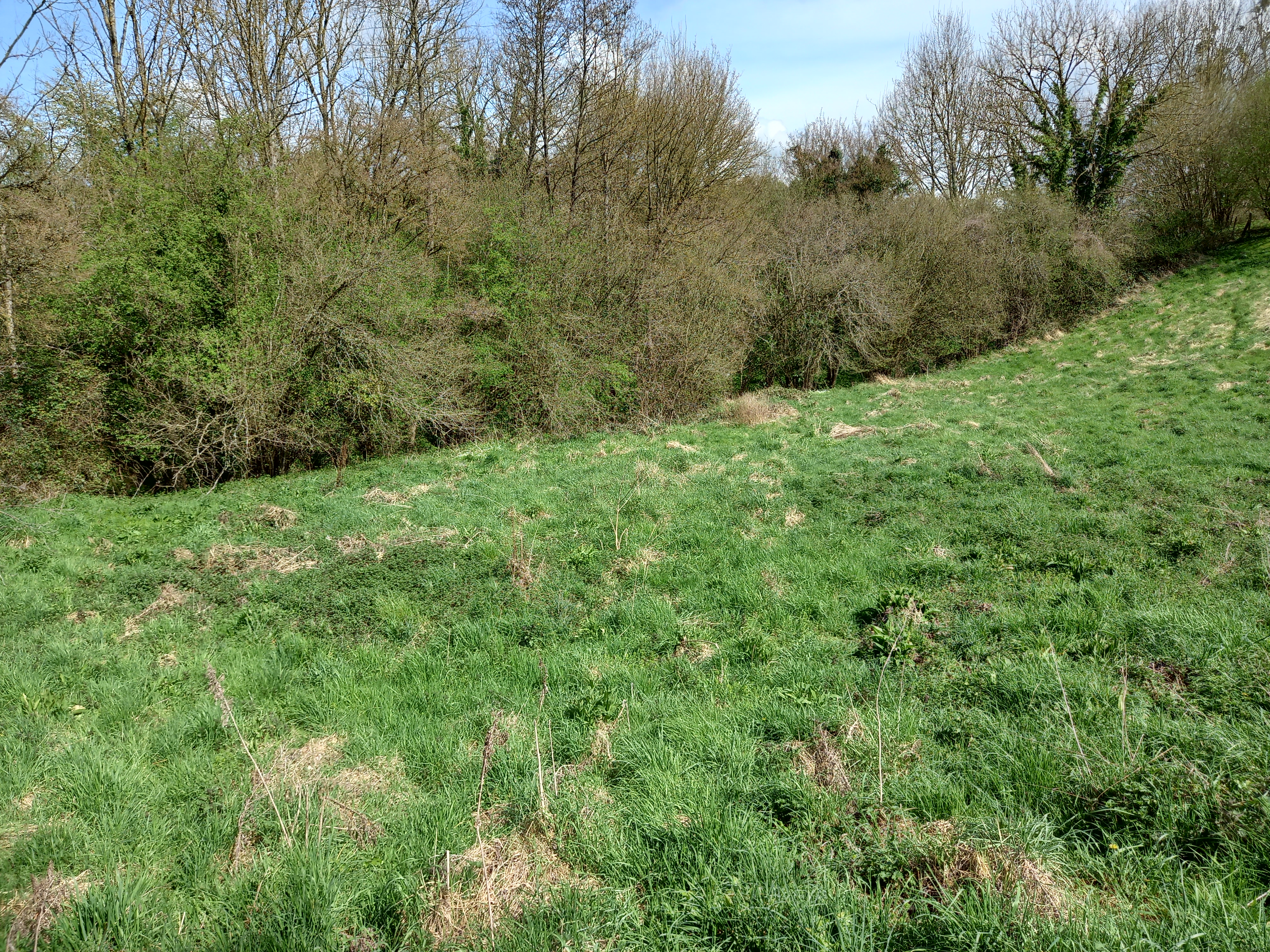
View of the orchestra.

The stage was situated on the left bank of the stream. The stage wall was required to be as high as the highest seating rows. The frons scaena is typically poorly preserved due to its accessibility for material recovery. In the Briga theater, the frons scaenae included columns and an 11-meter inscription. In Lisieux, different parts of the building are situated on both sides of the stream.

The building was constructed using a combination of "small masonry and brick", with alternating courses of stones held together by strong cement and large bricks. Additionally, "there were courses of rubble alternating with two rows of long terracotta slabs, all bound by high-quality lime mortar". The proscenium of the building may have been made of wood. François Cottin identifies three construction phases for the building, involving masonry with brick chaining and white mortar, masonry with pink mortar, and a final phase using bricks and pink mortar.

Arcisse de Caumont estimated the dimensions to be approximately 68 by 40 meters, while Abbé Simon proposed a figure of 109 meters. Raymond Lantier's early 20th-century measurements were approximately 68 by 48 meters (Note: Lantier 1911, pp. 333–334) but excluded the outer enclosure, the frons scaenae, and the part joining the stage front and the semicircle. Pierre Jeanjean estimated the length of the building to be approximately 43 meters. Claude Lemaître estimated the dimensions to be approximately 100 by 70 meters.

=== Adaptation to topography ===
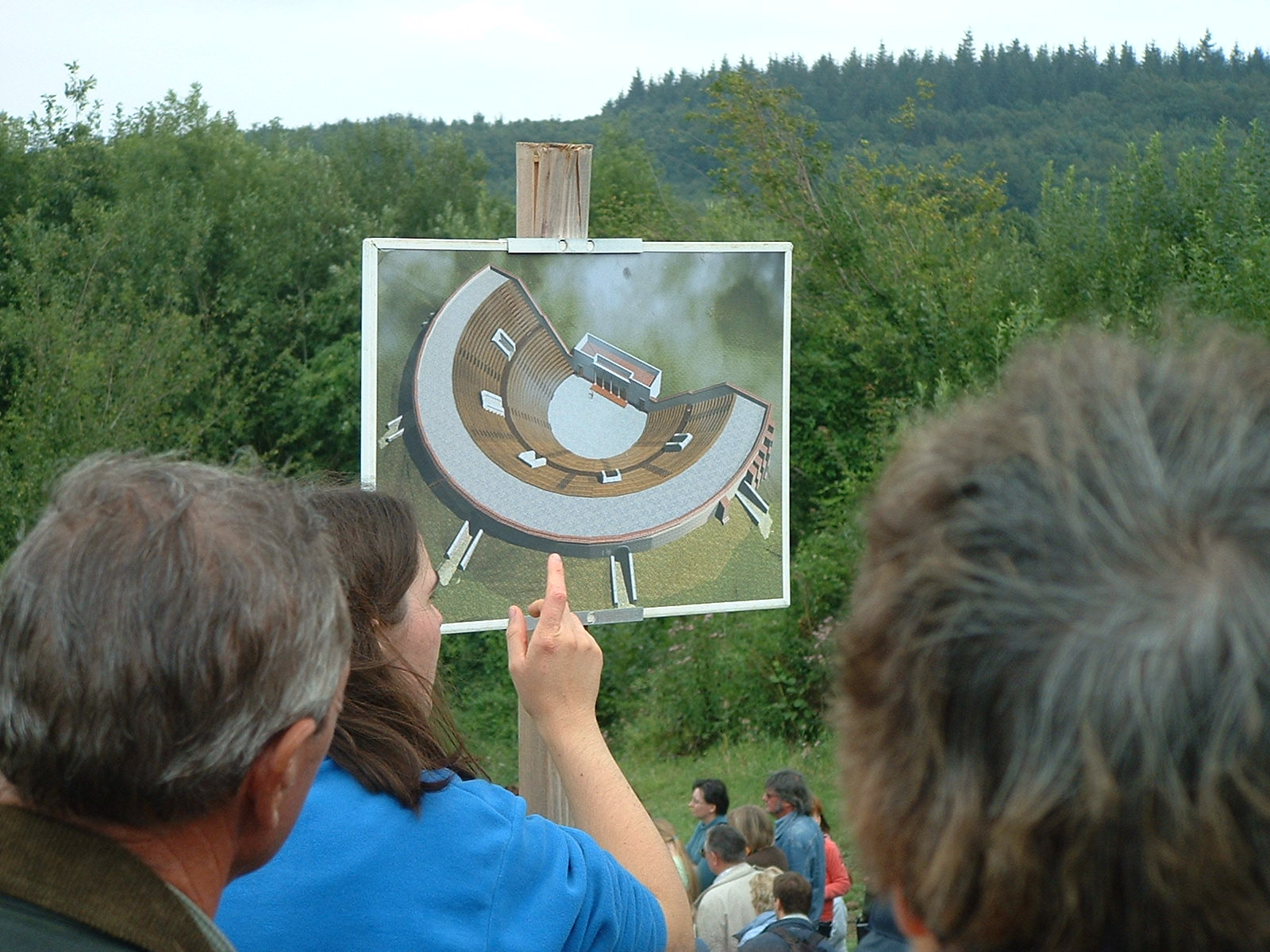
Computer graphics of the Briga theater in present-day Seine-Maritime in 2006.

The site's topography necessitated masonry work at the ends due to level differences, with arcades still visible at the end of the 18th century. The cellars observed by early observers were "a type of internal buttress, in a semicircle", serving as a retaining wall.

The theater's distinctive architectural feature is its construction over a watercourse, which was once channeled and 3 meters wide. This necessitated significant masonry work in the form of masonry arches to compensate for the level differences in the valley bottom. The arcades were designed to support the seating. (Note: Deniaux et al. 2002, p. 112)

== Interpretation ==
=== Uncertain purpose ===
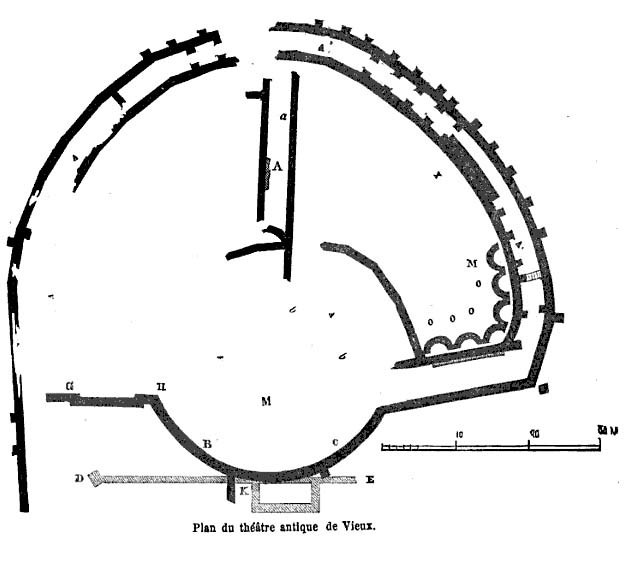
Plan surveyed at the Gallo-Roman theater in Vieux by the Society of Antiquaries of Normandy.

The theater in Vieux is said to bear a "striking resemblance" to the one in Lisieux, according to Pierre Jeanjean.

The purpose of the building "remains uncertain". While the forms of entertainment buildings, such as theaters and amphitheaters, are known, they are rarely used, leading to the creation of a new type of building. (Note: Deniaux et al. 2002, p. 110) This type was widespread in Roman Gaul, except in Narbonese Gaul, and included theater-amphitheaters called Gallo-Roman theaters. This versatile building type allowed for the avoidance of constructing "a costly new building".

This architectural style exemplifies the local adaptation of imported models. The structure should be comparable to those in Lillebonne or Lutetia, although each building was contingent upon the terrain and available funding.

=== Part of a vast rural sanctuary? ===
Theaters were sometimes integrated into religious contexts. Most Gallo-Roman theaters were linked to sanctuaries, while others were connected to secondary settlements. The theaters constructed in connection with a sanctuary were either linked to the upkeep of an existing place of worship or established during the Roman era.

The specific spectacles that could take place in mixed buildings are not well known. However, they likely served as settings for sacred ceremonies, in addition to entertainment. (Note: Golvin 2012, pp. 140–142) Claude Lemaître's work highlighted the presence of elements of a rural sanctuary at the site of Vieux-Lisieux. The theater would be "a complement to the sanctuary".

The rural sanctuary, situated a few kilometers from the city, would not be exceptional, as Vieil Évreux is 7 kilometers away. A comparable theater-sanctuary configuration can also be observed in Autun.

=== Symbolic element of the Romanization process ===
Roman theatre of Lillebonne

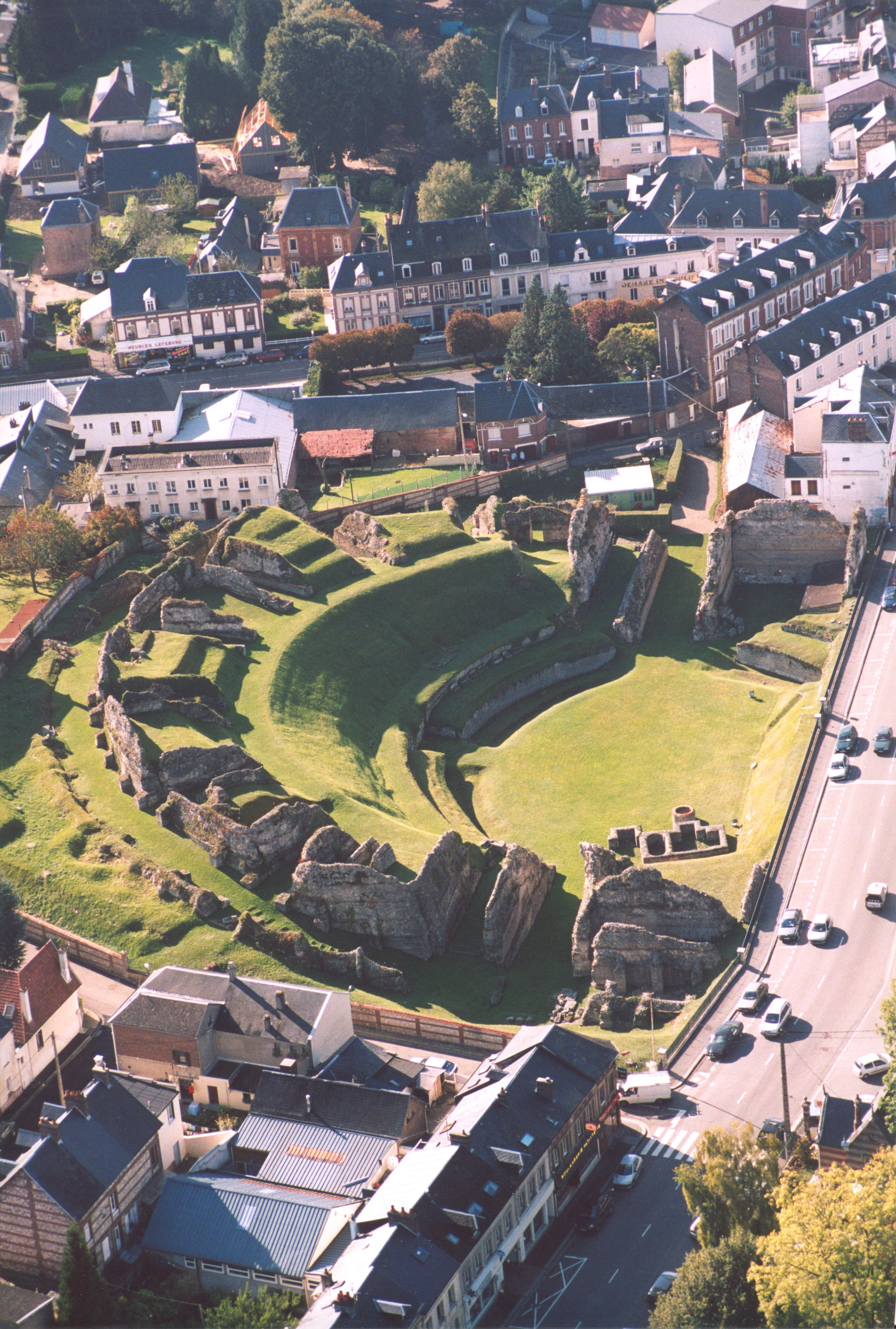
Aerial view of the Roman theatre of Lillebonne.

Successive states of the same building.

The Romans introduced the spectacles they enjoyed to the area that would become Normandy. (Note: Deniaux et al. 2002, p. 109) The adoption of the theater is "an example of the Romanization of Gaul and the integration capabilities of the Romanized populations". It is possible that the building included specific seating around the orchestra reserved for notable individuals.

The construction cost of the building was considerable, and its impact on the urban landscape was significant. A theater is often regarded as "a prestige monument and an ostentatious construction". (Note: Deniaux et al. 2002, pp. 110–111) These buildings were often funded by wealthy evergetes, primarily local magistrates. (Note: Deniaux et al. 2002, p. 115)

The remains do not appear to be associated with the "ancient city of the Lexovii". In 1911, Raymond Lantier expressed the hope that "methodical works would be undertaken, particularly at the entrance, on the mound of deposited earth, and along the banks of the Merderet". A century later, this hope has yet to be fulfilled.

== See also ==
=== Related articles ===
- Roman theatre (structure)
- List of Roman theatres

=== External links ===
- "Le Théâtre Romain de Lisieux, les spectacles chez nous il y a 2000 ans, Victor Le Fort, 1912" (in French). Archived from the original on 24 January 2017.
- "Bibliographie sur l'édifice". theatrum.de (in German). Archived from the original on 13 April 2024.

== Bibliography ==
=== General literature ===
- de Caumont, Arcisse (1838). Cours d'antiquités monumentales (in French). Paris: Derache. pp. 442–445. Archived from the original on 31 May 2024.
- Delacampagne, Florence (1990). Carte archéologique de la Gaule, 14. Le Calvados (in French). Paris: Maison des sciences de l'homme. ISBN 2-87754-011-1.
- Deniaux, Élisabeth; Lorren, Claude; Bauduin, Pierre; Jarry, Thomas (2002). La Normandie avant les Normands, de la conquête romaine à l'arrivée des Vikings (in French). Rennes: Ouest-France. ISBN 2-7373-1117-9.
- Golvin, Jean-Claude (1988). L'amphithéâtre romain : essai sur la théorisation de sa forme et de ses fonctions (in French). Vol. I and II. Paris: De Boccard. pp. 227–229.
- Golvin, Jean-Claude (2013). Le théâtre romain et ses spectacles (in French). Lacapelle-Marival: Archéologie nouvelle. ISBN 979-10-91458-06-1.
- Golvin, Jean-Claude (2012). L'amphithéâtre romain et les jeux du cirque dans le monde romain (in French). Lacapelle-Marival: Archéologie nouvelle. ISBN 978-2-9533973-5-2.
- Sear, Frank (2006). Roman theatres : An architectural study. Oxford University Press. ISBN 978-0-19-814469-4. Archived from the original on 31 May 2024.
- Collectif (2001). Le patrimoine des communes du Calvados (in French). Paris: Flohic. ISBN 2-84234-111-2.

=== Literature on ancient Lisieux or on theater ===
- Mandy, Bernard; Pilet, Christian (1994). Lisieux avant l'an mil : Essai de reconstitution (in French). Lisieux: Ville de Lisieux. ISBN 2-9508063-1-7.
- Cottin, François (1957). "Noviomagus Lexioviorum des temps les plus anciens à la fin de l'époque romaine". Society of Antiquaries of Normandy (offprint published in Lisieux in 1957, p. 31) (in French). LIII (1955–1956): 169–196.
- Jeanjean, Pierre (1971). "Le théâtre romain de Lisieux". Le Pays d'Auge (in French). February (2): 22–26.
- Lajoye, Patrice (2012). Religions et cultes à Lisieux (Normandie) dans l'Antiquité et au haut Moyen ge (in French).
- Lantier, Raymond (1911). "Le théâtre gallo-romain de Vieux-Lisieux". Bulletin archéologique du Comité des travaux historiques et scientifiques (in French): 332–334.
- Lemaître, Claude (1985a). "À propos du théâtre gallo-romain du Vieux-Lisieux". Le Pays d'Auge (in French). April (4): 9–16.
- Lemaître, Claude (1985b). "Lisieux dans l'Antiquité". Art de Basse-Normandie (in French) (89–90–91): 12–29.
