= Camila Gonzalez =

Canadian TV host, producer and journalist

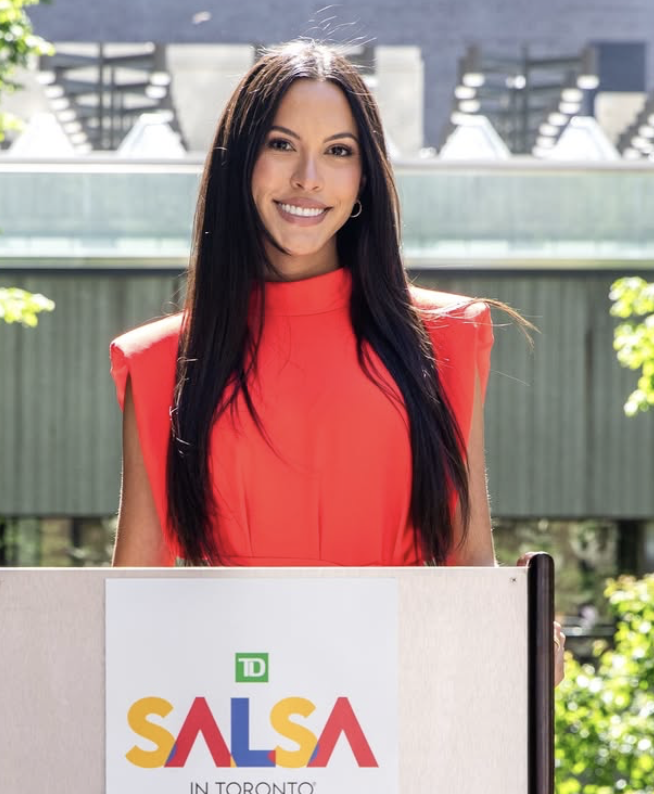
- Born: July 7, 1997 (age 29)
- Education: Toronto Metropolitan University
- Occupations: TV Host, producer and sports reporter
- Years active: 2012–Present

Camila Gonzalez (born July 7, 1997) is a Canadian tv host, producer, journalist and beauty pageant titleholder known for her work across sports, soccer, entertainment and Latin media. Her coverage spans major TV events including international soccer, MLS the NBA Finals, Rogers Cup, and Serie A. She serves as a studio host and on-site reporter for TSN.

== Personal life ==
Gonzalez was born in Cali, Colombia, and raised in Brampton, Ontario. She studied journalism at Toronto Metropolitan University and has worked in radio and television broadcasting in Canada since the age of 14.

== Television ==
Gonzalez first gained wide attention through a viral interview with Bad Bunny in 2017 which accumulated over 4 million views and launched her television career.

She joined TSN as studio host of Major League Soccer on TSN and one of the hosts of SportsCentre: Road to 2026, dedicated programming leading into the 2026 FIFA World Cup. She is a co-host and producer of Game and Glory, a 9-part series produced by S-Media and broadcast in English and Spanish on TSN and distributed internationally, filmed across 14 countries exploring global football culture.

From 2018 to 2024, Gonzalez hosted and produced the Serie A Halftime Show on TLN, filming across three continents with AC Milan, Inter Milan, Juventus, AS Roma, and SSC Napoli. Notable interviews include Carlo Ancelotti, Thibaut Courtois, Victor Osimhen, Lautaro Martínez, and Tijjani Reijnders.

As Canada's only correspondent from 2016 onwards at the Latin Grammy Awards, Premio Lo Nuestro and the Latin Billboard Awards, she covered Latin music's biggest names with Univision Canada.

Gonzalez won a Google News Initiative Award in Multimedia Journalism for her participation in the project “Hong Kong 360.” The multimedia project was produced by undergrad and grad students from Ryerson University’s journalism program from May to June 2018 in Hong Kong.

== Documentary ==
In collaboration with TLN Studios, Gonzalez produced Heart of Goal: The Rise of Canadian Soccer. The feature-length documentary follows the Canadian Men's National Soccer Team as they qualified for the 2022 World Cup. The film highlights the immigrant stories behind the team's success, with appearances by Jonathan Osorio, Cyle Larin, Doneil Henry, Melissa Tancredi, Tosaint Ricketts and more. The film premiered at Scotiabank Theatre in downtown Toronto and on TLN nationwide in October 2022.

== Live events ==
Gonzalez has served as stage host of Salsa on St. Clair, Canada's largest Latin street festival, drawing over 300,000 attendees annually, since 2018. She has also hosted Hispanic Day on Parliament Hill, a national event celebrating Hispanic voices in Canadian policy and public life.

Gonzalez placed 1st runner-up at Miss Universe Canada and was crowned Miss International Canada 2018. The winner was Marta Stępień, who also preceded Gonzalez as Miss International Canada 2017.

Gonzalez represented Canada at Miss International 2018 on November 9, 2018 in Tokyo, Japan.
