= Miss Universe Canada 2018 =

- Date: August 18, 2018
- Presenters: Sonny Borrelli; Chelsae Durocher
- Venue: John Bassett Theatre, Metro Toronto Convention Centre, Toronto
- Broadcaster: Livestream
- Entrants: 60
- Placements: 20
- Winner: Marta Stepien; South Ontario
- Congeniality: Keyla Letanno (Ontario) Bolton
- Photogenic: Nova Stevens; Vancouver

Miss Universe Canada 2018, the 16th Miss Universe Canada pageant, was held on August 18, 2018 at John Bassett Theatre, Metro Toronto Convention Centre, Toronto. Lauren Howe of Ontario Province crowned Marta Stepien of South Ontario at the end of the event. The first runner-up represented Canada at Miss International 2018 and the second runner-up represented the country in Reinado Internacional del Café 2019.

== Final results ==
Final results	Contestant	Results
Miss Universe Canada 2018	South Ontario – Marta Stępień	Top 10
1st Runner-Up (Miss International Canada 2018)	North Toronto – Camila Gonzalez	Unplaced
2nd Runner-up (Miss Eco International)	Central Ontario – Sasha Lombardi	Top 20
3rd Runner-up	Quebec Province – Megha Sandhu	
4th Runner-up	Southeast Ontario – Sallyblossom Wright	
Top 10	East Toronto – Rita Houkayem; (Ontario) Mississauga – Sarah Martens; (Ontario) Pickering – Brittany-Anne Dawes; West Canada – Nicolette Santilli; West Ontario – Tessa Johnston	
Top 20	(Ontario) Belle River – Tasha Toulouse; (Ontario) Bolton – Keyla Letanno; Lower British Columbia – Gloren Guelos; Montreal – Ashley Florestal; Northeast Toronto – Alicia Angus; Ontario Province – Priiya Singh; Southeast Toronto – Elizabeth Quan; (Alberta) Stony Plain – Vanessa Chauhan; (Ontario) Upper Canada – Karol Lopez; Vancouver – Karen Cherry Gosal	

=== Special awards ===
Award	Contestant
Miss Congeniality	(Ontario) Toronto – Keyla Letanno
Miss Photogenic	Vancouver – Nova Stevens

== Official delegates ==
Meet the 60 national delegates competing for the title of Miss Universe Canada 2018:

Represents	Contestant	Age	Height	Hometown
Alberta Province	Jan Kamar	23	1.71 m (5 ft 7 in)	Calgary
Atlantic Canada	Svetlana Mamaeva	19	1.70 m (5 ft 7 in)	Toronto
(Ontario) Belle River	Tasha Toulouse	22	1.75 m (5 ft 9 in)	Belle River
(Ontario) Brampton	Keyla Letanno	23	1.80 m (5 ft 11 in)	Brampton
British Columbia Province	Karen Gosal	18	1.49 m (4 ft 11 in)	Langley
Calgary	Ciara Stewart	24	1.65 m (5 ft 5 in)	Calgary
Central Canada	Yamina Chekroun	27	1.67 m (5 ft 6 in)	Toronto
Central Ontario	Sasha Lombardi	22	1.72 m (5 ft 8 in)	Toronto
Central Toronto	Linnea Kiefer		1.65 m (5 ft 5 in)	Toronto
(Ontario) Dresden	Katherine Highgate	25	1.71 m (5 ft 7 in)	Dresden
East Canada	Michelle Cardozo	23	1.65 m (5 ft 5 in)	Brampton
East Ontario	Sara Tavanaie	26	1.70 m (5 ft 7 in)	Toronto
East Toronto	Rita Houkayem	27	1.75 m (5 ft 9 in)	Toronto
(Ontario) Hammond	Melissa Marengh	24	1.70 m (5 ft 7 in)	Hammond
(Ontario) Huntsville	Ciara Thompson	22	1.68 m (5 ft 6 in)	Huntsville
(Ontario) Lakeshore	Sara Pizzicaroli	21	1.74 m (5 ft 9 in)	Lakeshore
(Ontario) London	Jackie Wojciechowski	24	1.73 m (5 ft 8 in)	London
Lower Alberta	Samantha Morris	24	1.78 m (5 ft 10 in)	Calgary
Lower British Columbia	Gloren Guelos	23	1.65 m (5 ft 5 in)	Surrey
Lower Canada	Alyssa Ortiz	24	1.65 m (5 ft 5 in)	Mississauga
Manitoba Province	Paris Musaphir	21	1.74 m (5 ft 9 in)	East St. Paul
(Alberta) Marwayne	Shania Kulczycki	27	1.72 m (5 ft 8 in)	Marwayne
(Ontario) Mississauga	Sarah Genia Martens	26	1.70 m (5 ft 7 in)	Mississauga
Montreal	Ashley Florestal	23	1.76 m (5 ft 9 in)	Montreal
National Capital Region	Amy Green	20	1.73 m (5 ft 8 in)	Ottawa
New Brunswick Province	Emma McBeil	18	1.81 m (5 ft 11 in)	Moncton
Newfoundland and Labrador Province	Mackenzie Dove	22	1.72 m (5 ft 8 in)	St. John's
North Ontario	Gina Pereira	22	1.70 m (5 ft 7 in)	Thunder Bay
North Toronto	Camila Gonzalez	21	1.76 m (5 ft 9 in)	Toronto
Northeast Toronto	Alicia Angus	22	1.80 m (5 ft 11 in)	Toronto
Northwest Toronto	Nimmi Augustine	23	1.65 m (5 ft 5 in)	Toronto
Nova Scotia Province	Nika Gantar	18	1.69 m (5 ft 7 in)	Bedford
Ontario Province	Priiya Singh	23	1.74 m (5 ft 9 in)	Toronto
Ottawa	Laura Cavé	24	1.73 m (5 ft 8 in)	Ottawa
(Ontario) Pickering	Brittany-Anne Dawes	25	1.72 m (5 ft 8 in)	Pickering
Prince Edward Island Province	Alissa Perniking	22	1.70 m (5 ft 7 in)	Charlottetown
Quebec Province	Megha Sandhu	22	1.76 m (5 ft 9 in)	Montreal
Saskatchewan Province	Rajah Musa Daldum	26	1.70 m (5 ft 7 in)	Regina
South Canada	Kaydee Guillaume	25	1.74 m (5 ft 9 in)	Brampton
South Ontario	Marta Stępień	24	1.78 m (5 ft 10 in)	Windsor
South Toronto	Farishta Barez	26	1.67 m (5 ft 6 in)	Toronto
Southeast Ontario	Sallyblossom Wright	22	1.73 m (5 ft 8 in)	Toronto
Southeast Toronto	Elizabeth Quan	25	1.79 m (5 ft 10 in)	Toronto
Southern Quebec	Olga Vaksman	23	1.66 m (5 ft 5 in)	Montreal
Southwest Ontario	Cierra Bray	25	1.70 m (5 ft 7 in)	Windsor
Southwest Toronto	Bianca Jade Foo	24	1.75 m (5 ft 9 in)	Toronto
(Alberta) Stony Plain	Vanessa Chauhan	26	1.69 m (5 ft 7 in)	Stony Plain
(Ontario) Sudbury	Veronique Langis	18	1.78 m (5 ft 10 in)	Sudbury
(Ontario) Tecumseh	Kallie Szarka	23	1.71 m (5 ft 7 in)	Tecumseh
(Alberta) The Rockies	Sheerin Hai	22	1.75 m (5 ft 9 in)	Calgary
Upper Alberta	Sarah Hungar	27	1.65 m (5 ft 5 in)	Calgary
Upper British Columbia	Rafaella Enderica	21	1.73 m (5 ft 8 in)	Port Coquitlam
Upper Canada	Karol Lopez Penagos	23	1.77 m (5 ft 10 in)	London
Vancouver	Nova Stevens	25	1.83 m (6 ft 0 in)	Vancouver
(Ontario) Vaughan	Alencia Palkilayin	18	1.73 m (5 ft 8 in)	Vaughan
West Canada	Nicolette Santilli	24	1.73 m (5 ft 8 in)	Windsor
West Ontario	Tessa Johnston	22	1.73 m (5 ft 8 in)	Windsor
West Toronto	Kathy Spence	23	1.69 m (5 ft 7 in)	Toronto
(Ontario) Windsor	Jelena Komlenac	20	1.65 m (5 ft 5 in)	Windsor
Yukon Territory	Lucy Lee Croix	19	1.84 m (6 ft 0 in)	Whitehorse
