= Samantha Colas =

Haitian beauty pageant contestant and presenter (born 1992)

- Born: Samantha Colas; October 17, 1992 (age 33); Port-au-Prince, Haiti
- Height: 1.80 m (5 ft 11 in)
- Beauty pageant titleholder
- Title: Miss Haiti 2018
- Hair color: Black
- Eye color: Brown
- Major competitions: Miss Haiti 2018 (Winner); Miss Universe 2018 (Unplaced)

Samantha Colas (born October 17, 1992) is a Haitian model and beauty pageant titleholder who won Miss Haiti 2018. By winning the title, she represented the country in Miss Universe 2018, but failed to place. She is also known for being the presenter of the children's television singing show Soleil d'été.

== Early and personal life ==
Samantha Colas was born on October 17, 1992 in Port-au-Prince. She was an only child and was raised by alone by her mother after her father's died while Colas was young. She attended the Université Notre Dame d'Haïti, where she earned her Bachelor's degree in social communication in 2017.

Colas sustained severe injuries during the 2010 Haiti earthquake, and doctors recommended amputating both of her arms; however, she refused the surgery and recovered.

== Career ==
Her first role in entertainment was as a host of a Catholic radio show as a child, which inspired her to pursue a career in the industry. She began hosting the children's television singing contest Soleil d'été at the age of 16.

On July 6, 2018, Colas was crowned as Miss Haiti at the Marriott Hotel. She succeeded the outgoing Miss Haiti 2017, Cassandra Chery. As Miss Haiti, Colas represented the country at the Miss Universe 2018 pageant in Bangkok, Thailand, however she was unable to place and was eliminated from the contest. During an interview with The Haitian Times, Colas stated that she entered the competition to gain a larger platform so she could gain support for her charitable causes.

During the next Miss Haiti contest in 2019, Colas crowned her successor Gabriela Vallejo at the Hotel El Rancho.

Awards and achievements
Preceded by Cassandra Chéry	Miss Haiti; 2018	Succeeded by Gabriela Vallejo
