= Roman theatre (structure) =

Theatre building built in ancient Roman times

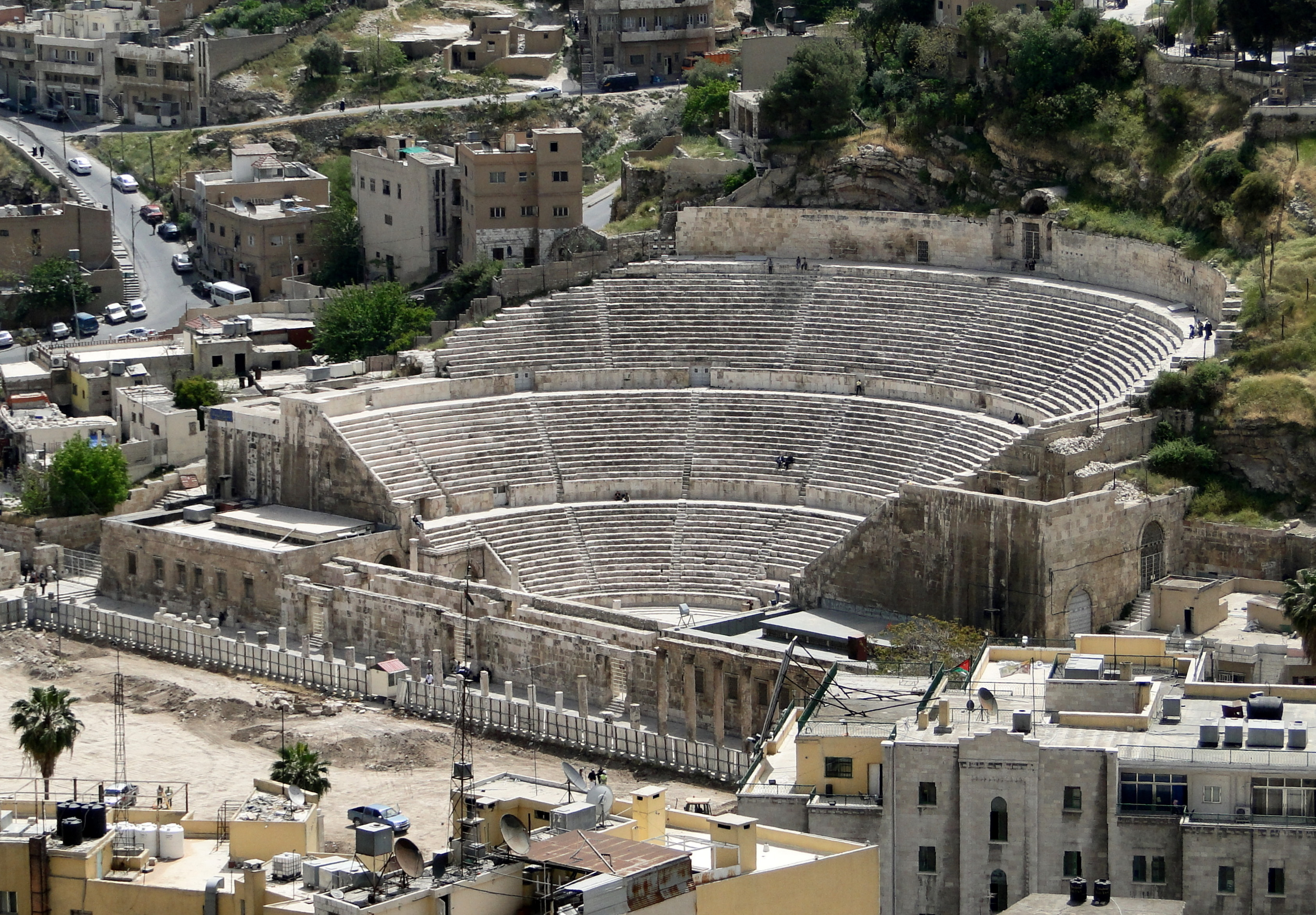
Roman theatre at Amman, Jordan

Roman theatres derive from and are part of the overall evolution of earlier Greek theatres. Much of the architectural influence on the Romans came from the Greeks, and theatre structural design was no different from other buildings. However, Roman theatres have specific differences, such as generally being built upon their own foundations instead of earthen works or a hillside and being completely enclosed on all sides.

== Architecture ==
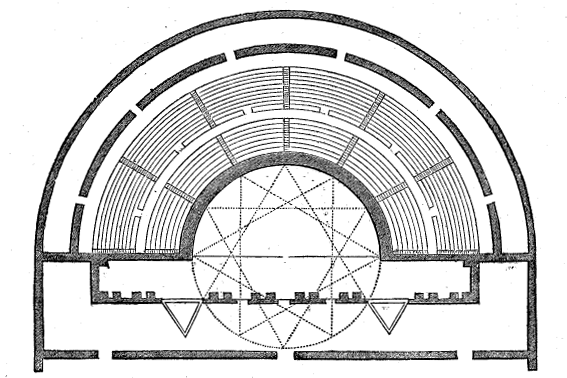
Standard floor plan of a Roman theatre

Roman theatres were built in all areas of the Empire, from Spain to the Middle East. Because of the Romans' ability to influence local architecture, we see numerous theatres around the world with uniquely Roman attributes.

Similarities exist between the theatres and amphitheaters of ancient Rome. They were constructed out of the same material, Roman concrete, and provided a place for the public to go and see numerous events. However, they are two entirely different structures, with specific layouts that lend to the different events they held. Amphitheatres did not need superior acoustics, unlike those provided by the structure of a Roman theatre. While amphitheatres would feature races and gladiatorial events, theatres hosted events such as plays, pantomimes, choral events, orations, and commerce. Their design, with its semicircular form, enhances the natural acoustics, unlike Roman amphitheatres constructed in the round.

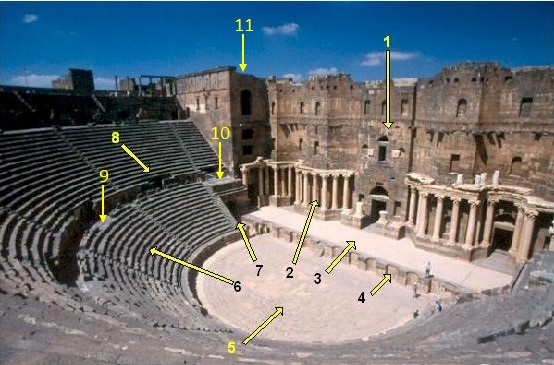
Interior view of the Roman theatre of Bosra, Syria: 1) Scaenae frons 2) Porticus post scaenam 3) Pulpitum 4) Proscaenium 5) Orchestra 6) Cavea 7) Aditus maximus 8) Vomitorium.

These buildings were semi-circular and possessed certain inherent architectural structures, with minor differences depending on the region in which they were constructed. The scaenae frons was a high back wall of the stage floor, supported by columns. The proscaenium was a wall that supported the front edge of the stage with ornately decorated niches off to the sides. The Hellenistic influence is seen through the use of the proscenium. The Roman theatre also had a podium, which sometimes supported the columns of the scaenae frons. The theatre itself was divided into the stage (orchestra) and the seating section (cavea). The cavea was sometimes constructed on a small hill or slope in which stacked seating could be easily made in the tradition of the Greek theatres. The center of the cavea was hollowed out of a hill or slope, while the outer radian seats required structural support and solid retaining walls. This was not always the case as Romans tended to build their theatres regardless of the availability of hillsides. All theatres built within the city of Rome were completely man-made without the use of earthworks. The cavea was not roofed, rather, awnings (velarium) could be pulled overhead to provide shelter from rain or sunlight. Vomitoria, passages situated below or behind a tier of seats, were made available to the audience.

Some Roman theatres, constructed of wood, were torn down after the festival for which they were erected concluded. This practice was due to a moratorium on permanent theatre structures that lasted until 55 BC when the Theatre of Pompey was built with the addition of a temple to avoid the law. Some Roman theatres show signs of never having been completed in the first place.

Inside Rome, few theatres have survived the centuries following their construction, providing little evidence about the specific theatres. The Roman Theatre of Orange in modern Orange, France, is a good example of a classic Roman theatre, with an indented scaenae frons, reminiscent of why Western Roman theatre designs, however, stripped of its ornamental stone columns and statues.

== Gallery ==
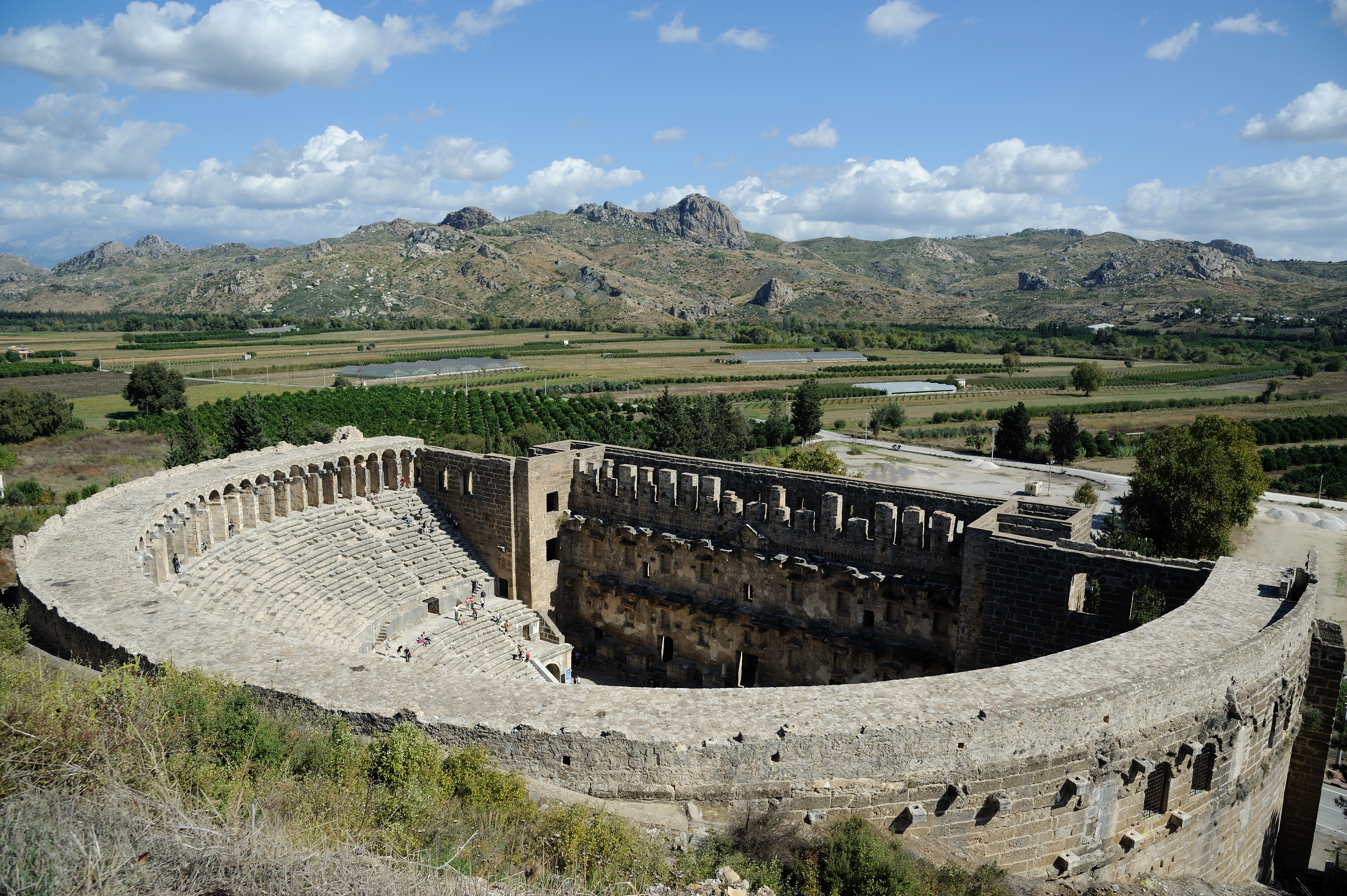
Well preserved Roman Theatre of Aspendos

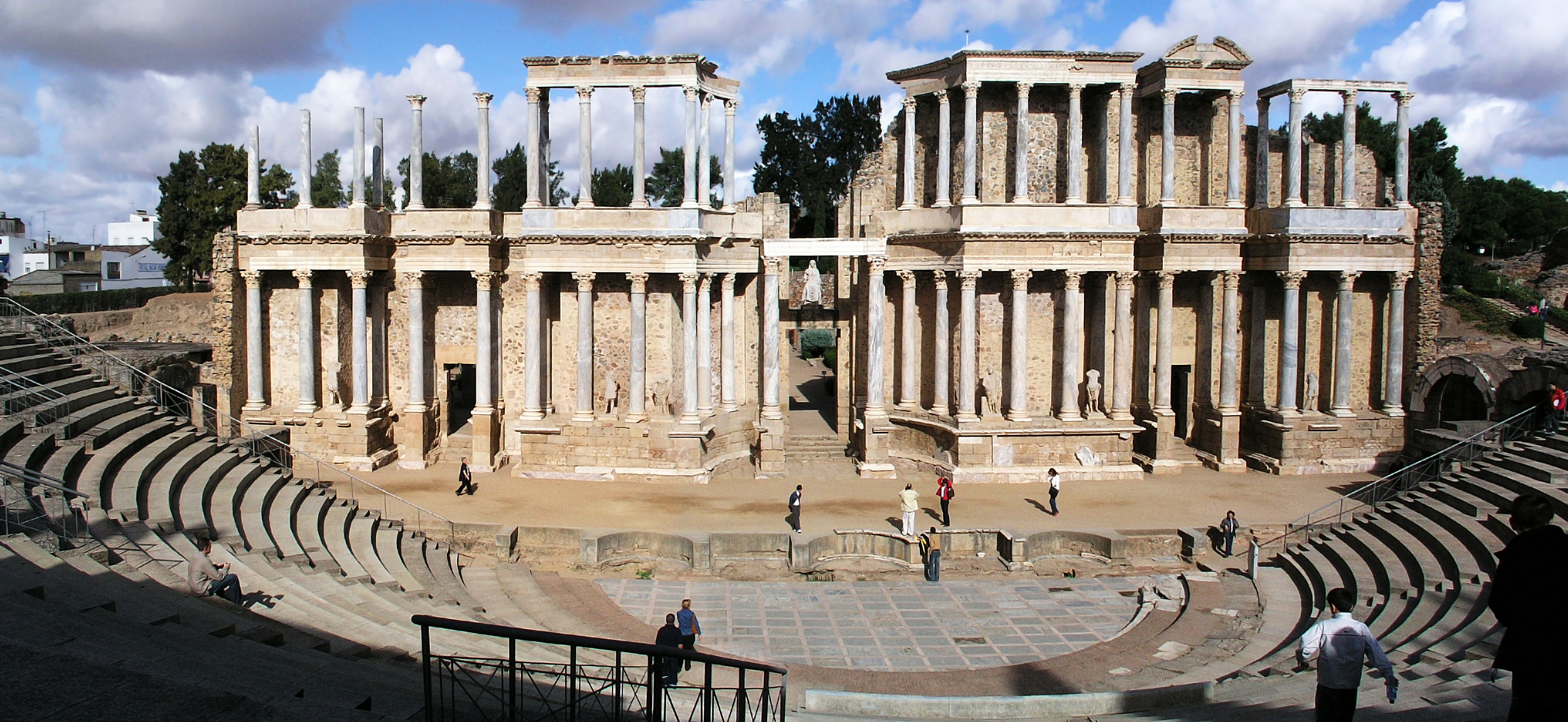
Roman Theatre (Mérida)

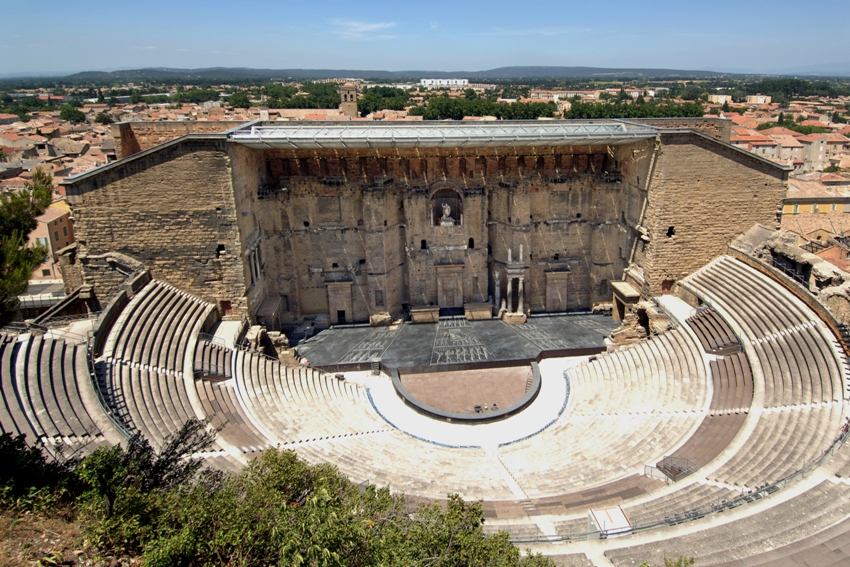
Roman Theatre of Orange, France

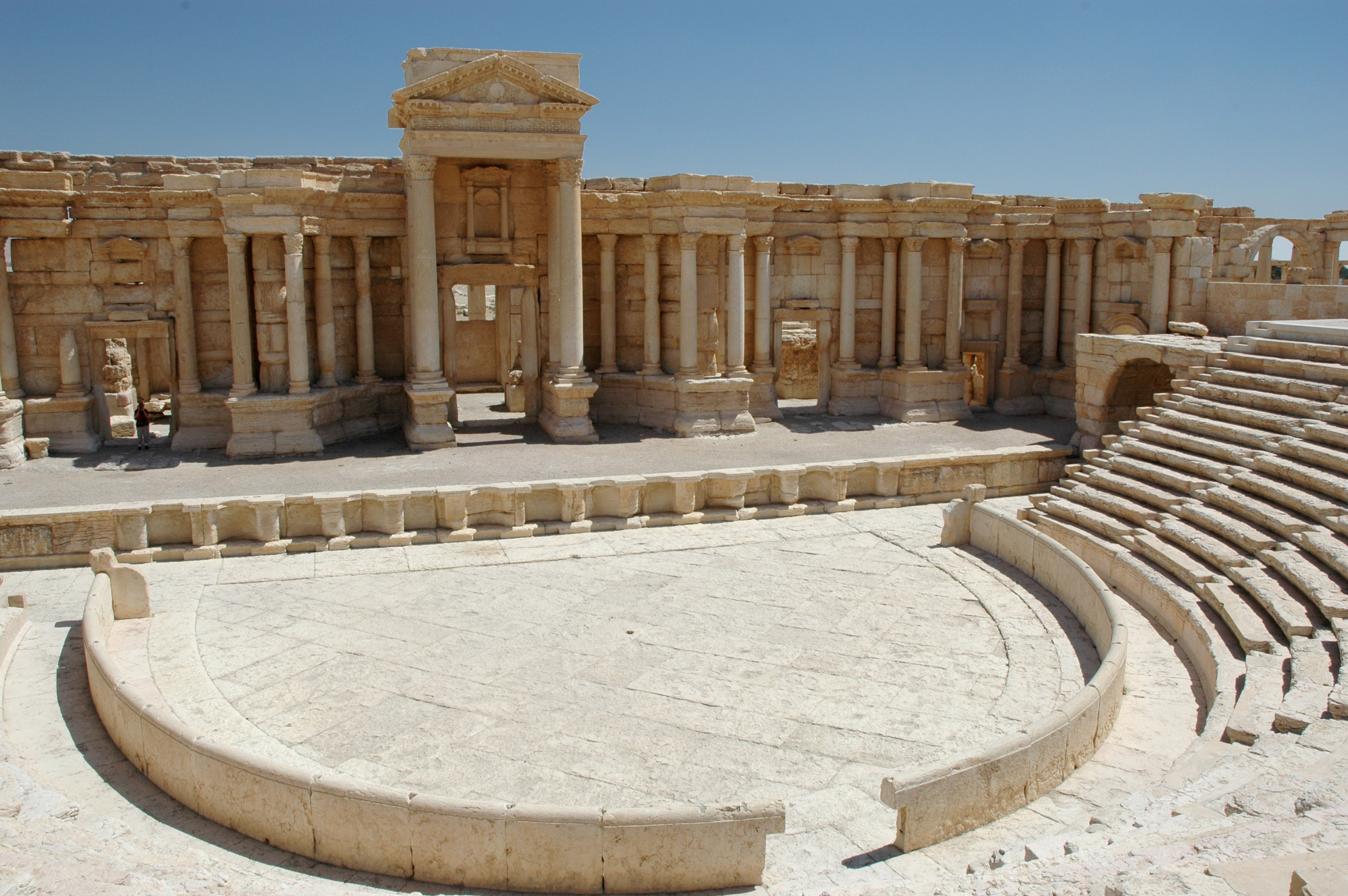
Roman Theatre at Palmyra

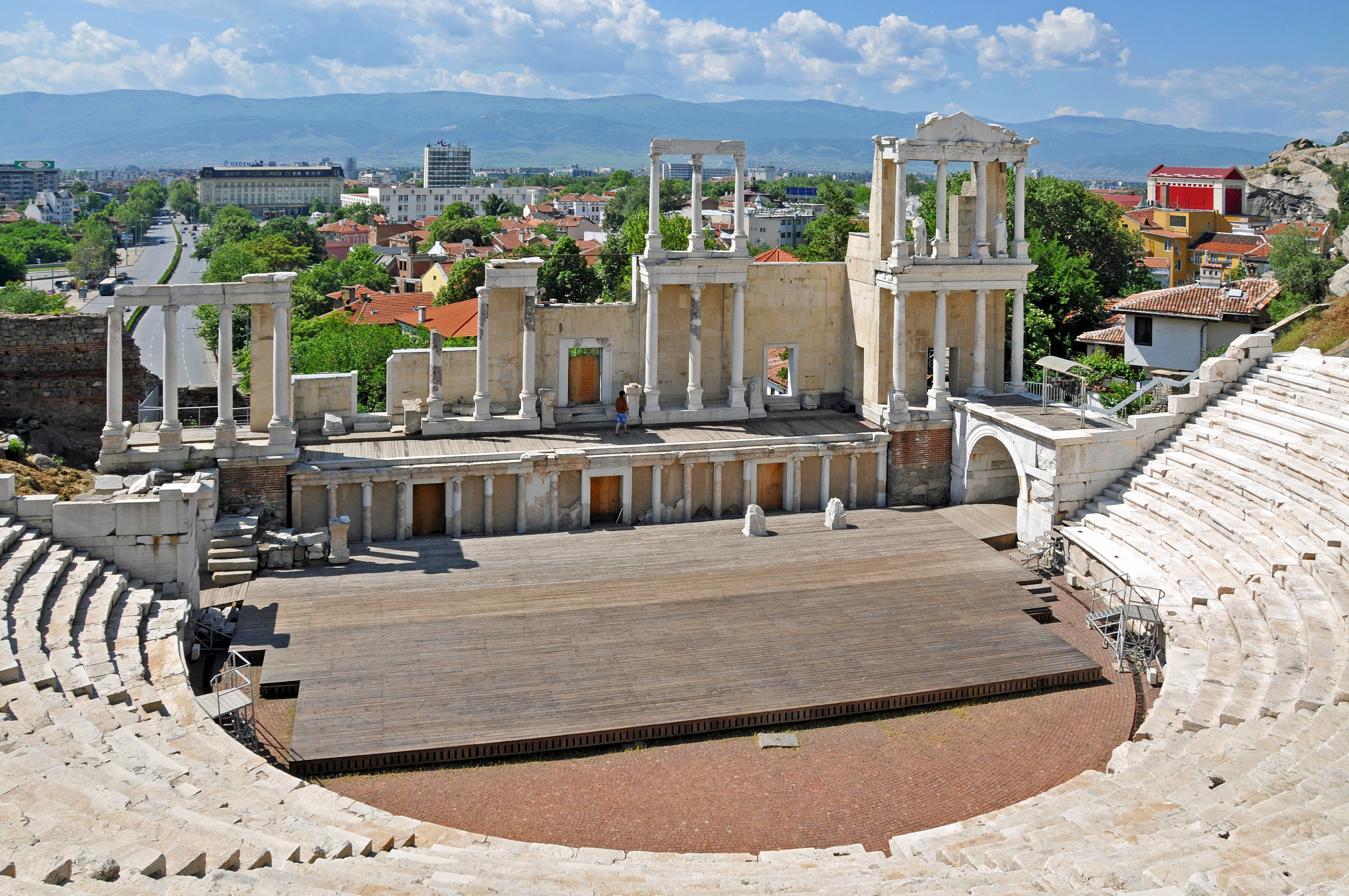
Plovdiv Roman theatre, Bulgaria

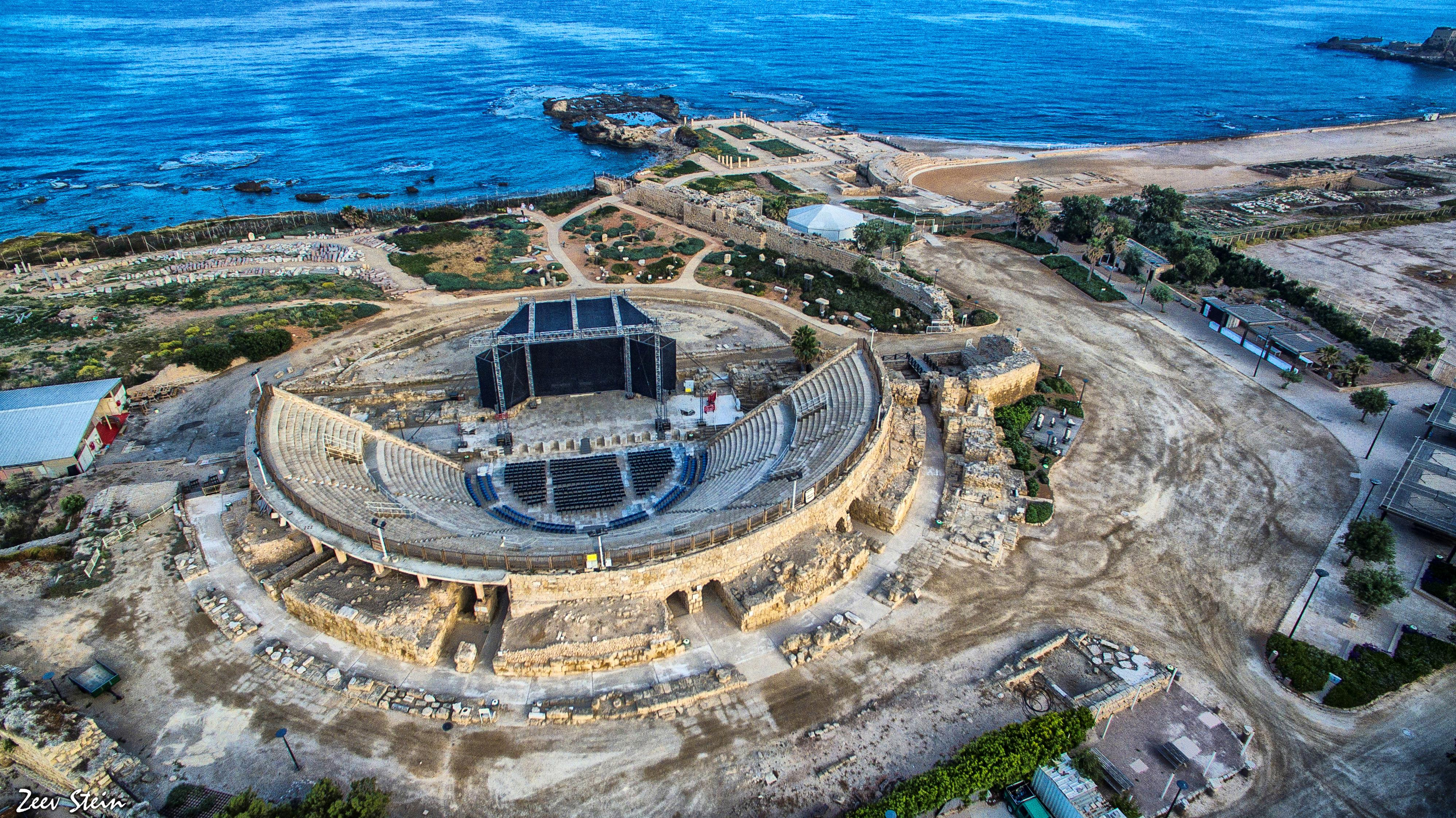
Roman Theatre of Caesarea, Israel

== See also ==
- List of Roman theatres
- Theatre of ancient Rome
- Roman architecture
- Gallo-Roman Theater of Lisieux
