= Marta Stępień =

Canadian model who is Miss Universe Canada 2018

- Born: Marta Magdalena Stępień; 11 March 1994 (age 32); Warsaw, Poland
- Height: 5 ft 11 in (180 cm)
- Spouse: Rodrigo Herrera (m. 2021)
- Beauty pageant titleholder
- Title: Miss International Canada 2017 Miss Universe Canada 2018
- Hair colour: Dark Blonde
- Eye colour: Light Brown
- Major competition: Miss Universe Canada 2017 (1st Runner-Up) Miss International 2017 (Unplaced) Reinado Internacional del Café 2018 (Virreina) Miss Universe Canada 2018 (Winner) Miss Universe 2018 (Top 10)

Marta Magdalena Stępień (born 11 March 1994) is a Canadian model and beauty pageant titleholder. She was crowned Miss International Canada 2017 and Miss Universe Canada 2018, and has represented Canada in the Miss International 2017 was Unplaced, and Miss Universe 2018 placed in the Top 10.

== Personal life ==
Stępień was born in Warsaw, Poland and raised in Windsor, Ontario. She is a student of Biomedical Engineering Technology at St. Clair College and is an applied researcher. She speaks Polish, English, and Spanish. She is also a professional model.

In March 2021, she married Mexican businessman Rodrigo Herrera.

== Pageantry ==
=== Miss Universe Canada 2017 ===
Stępień finished as the 1st Runner-up at Miss Universe Canada 2017 represented Upper Canada. Meanwhile, the official winner was Lauren Howe from Ontario Province crowned as 2017 winner and competed at Miss Universe 2017 in Las Vegas, United States. She placed in Top 10.

=== Miss International 2017 ===
Stępień represented Canada at the Miss International 2017 beauty contest in Tokyo, Japan but was unplaced. The pageant was won by Kevin Lilliana of Indonesia.

=== Reinado Internacional del Café 2018 ===
Stępień also represented her country at Reinado Internacional del Café 2018 in Colombia where she finished as Virreina to Carmen Serrano of Spain.

=== Miss Universe Canada 2018 ===
Stępień represented South Ontario was crowned Miss Universe Canada 2018 at the George Weston Recital Hall, Toronto Centre for the Arts on 18 August 2018. She succeeded outgoing Miss Universe Canada 2017, Lauren Howe.

=== Miss Universe 2018 ===
Stępień represented Canada at Miss Universe 2018 in Bangkok, Thailand. She wore a gown made by designer Michael Cinco. She placed in the top 10 out of 94 contestants.

Awards and achievements
Preceded by Amber Bernachi	Miss International Canada; 2017	Succeeded by Camila Gonzalez
Preceded by Lauren Howe	Miss Universe Canada; 2018	Succeeded by Alyssa Boston
