= Siera Bearchell =

Miss Universe Canada 2016

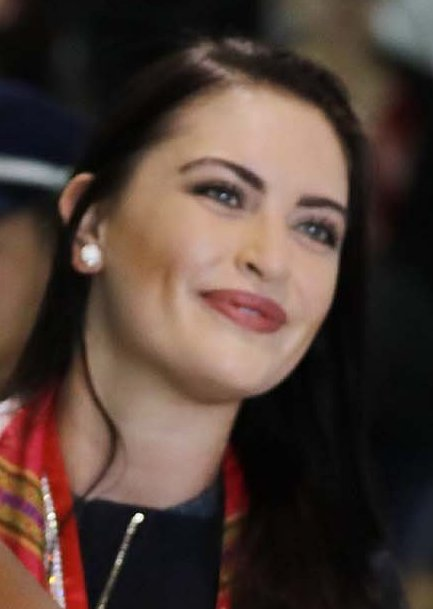
- Bearchell in 2017
- Born: February 15, 1993 (age 33); Moose Jaw, Saskatchewan, Canada
- Education: University of Saskatchewan College of Law (JD)
- Height: 1.75 m (5 ft 9 in)
- Spouse: Brennen Wray (m. 2017)
- Children: 2
- Beauty pageant titleholder
- Title: Miss Teen Saskatchewan World 2009; Miss Teen Canada World 2009; Miss Supranational Canada 2015; Miss Universe Canada 2016
- Hair colour: Brown
- Eye colour: Green
- Major competitions: Miss Supranational Canada 2015 (Winner); Miss Supranational 2015 (1st Runner-Up); Miss Universe Canada 2013 (1st Runner-Up); Miss Universe Canada 2016 (Winner); Miss Universe 2016 (Top 9)
- Website: www.sierabearchell.com

Siera Bearchell (born February 15, 1993) is a Canadian beauty pageant titleholder who was crowned Miss Universe Canada 2016. She represented Canada in the Miss Universe 2016 competition in Manila, where she placed in the top nine. While competing in Miss Universe, Bearchell received media attention for her curvier figure, which was seen as a detraction from the typical body standards associated with beauty pageants, and for her response to immense body shaming from Internet trolls.

Prior to becoming Miss Universe Canada 2016, Bearchell was the first runner-up in Miss Universe Canada 2013.

Apart from being a beauty queen, Siera has also built her brand as a YouTuber, which has garnered 170 thousand subscribers.

== Early life and education ==
Bearchell was born and raised in Moose Jaw, Saskatchewan. As a teenager, she was a dancer. She studied law at the University of Saskatchewan College of Law, graduating with a Juris Doctor specializing in Indigenous law in 2018. She is of Métis descent.

== Pageantry ==
=== Early career ===
Bearchell began her pageantry career as a teenager. After losing her family home to a house fire in 2009, Bearchell wished to pursue charity through pageantry after being inspired by the help her family received from organizations like the Red Cross. She competed in Miss Teen Saskatchewan World 2009, later winning the title and advancing to Miss Teen Canada World 2009, which she also won. As Miss Teen Canada World, she competed in Miss Teen World and placed as the second runner-up.

Bearchell afterwards took a hiatus from pageantry, returning to competition as an adult in 2013. She competed in Miss Universe Canada 2013, where she placed as the first runner-up behind winner Riza Santos. Afterwards, she competed in Miss Supranational Canada 2015 and won, going on to represent Canada at Miss Supranational 2015 in Krynica-Zdrój, Poland, where she placed as the first runner-up.

=== Miss Universe 2016 ===
In 2016, Bearchell returned to Miss Universe Canada, where she was crowned Miss Universe Canada 2016, after previously placing as the first runner-up in 2013. As Miss Universe Canada, she was given the right to represent Canada at the Miss Universe 2016 competition, to be held in Manila, Philippines.

Upon her arrival at Miss Universe, Bearchell became the victim of cyberbullying, with commentators making negative remarks regarding Bearchell's weight and appearance. Following these attacks, Bearchell received widespread media attention for breaking norms regarding the bodies of beauty pageant contestants, and for advocating for body positivity. When one reporter asked her during a media event, “How does it feel to be so much… larger than the other delegates?” her response was "It feels great". Bearchell went on to place in the top nine at Miss Universe, becoming the first Canadian entrant to reach the semifinals since Alice Panikian at Miss Universe 2006; the eventual winner of the competition was Iris Mittenaere, who had been crowned Miss France 2016. After the end of her reign, Bearchell crowned Lauren Howe as her Miss Universe Canada successor in 2017.

== Personal life ==
Bearchell married Brennan Wray, in November 2017 in Las Vegas, Nevada, just prior to attending Miss Universe 2017 They have one daughter, Lily Jaymes, born in 2019 and a son, Iver Thomas Scott, born in 2022.

Awards and achievements
Preceded by Paola Nunez Valdez	Miss Universe Canada; 2016	Succeeded by Lauren Howe
Preceded by (Thailand) Parapadsorn Vorrasirinda	Miss Supranational 1st Runner-up; 2015	Succeeded by (Venezuela) Valeria Vespoli
Preceded by Gabriela Vallejo	Miss Supranational Canada; 2015	Succeeded by Hanna Berkovic
