= Gabriela Vallejo =

Miss Universe Haiti 2019

Gabriela Clesca Vallejo
- Born: Dominican Republic
- Height: 1.70 m (5 ft 7 in)
- Beauty pageant titleholder
- Title: Miss Haiti 2019
- Major competitions: Miss Supranational Canada 2014 (Winner); Miss Supranational 2014 (Top 20); Miss Universe Canada 2017 (Top 20); Miss Haiti 2019 (Winner); Miss Universe 2019 (Unplaced)

Gabriela Clesca Vallejo is a Haitian-Canadian model and beauty pageant titleholder who was crowned Miss Haiti 2019. She represented Haiti at Miss Universe 2019, but was unable to place. She had also won Miss Supranational Canada 2014, as well as placing in the Top 20 of the international Miss Supranational 2014 and Miss Universe Canada 2017 competitions, earning the Miss Congeniality award in the former.

== Early and personal life ==
Gabriela Clesca Vallejo was born in the Dominican Republic to a Dominican mother and a Haitian father. She was raised in Haiti and grew up speaking French and Creole. Vallejo attended the Centre D'excellence Artistique De la Salle, where she specialised in ballet and modern dance. She and her family moved to Canada when she was a teenager. Vallejo studied Civil Law and International Relations at the University of Ottawa. While she was still at university, she also worked for the Federal Government at the Foreign Affairs Canada. She is 1.70 m (5 ft 7 in).

== Pageantry ==
Vallejo began her modelling career in 2011, and frequently worked with designer Gwen Madiba. In February of that year, Vallejo won the inaugural Miss Africa Montreal contest. Three years later, she competed and won Miss Supranational Canada, which earned her the right to represent Canada at the international Miss Supranational 2014 in Poland. She placed as a Top 20 finalist and won the Miss Congeniality award.

She later represented West Ottawa at the 2017 Miss Universe Canada pageant where she placed as a Top 20 finalist, while Lauren Howe won the pageant.

In 2019, Vallejo entered the Haitian contest, Miss Haiti, which she won and was crowned by the previous winner, Samantha Colas, at the Hotel El Rancho. By winning the contest, she was given the right to represent Haiti at Miss Universe 2019, where she was unplaced.

As of 2025, Vallejo was serving as the director of the Miss Turks and Caicos Universe beauty pageant contest.

Awards and achievements
Preceded by Samantha Colas	Miss Haiti; 2019	Succeeded by Eden Berandoive
