= Anedie Azael =

Haitian model and activist (born 1988)

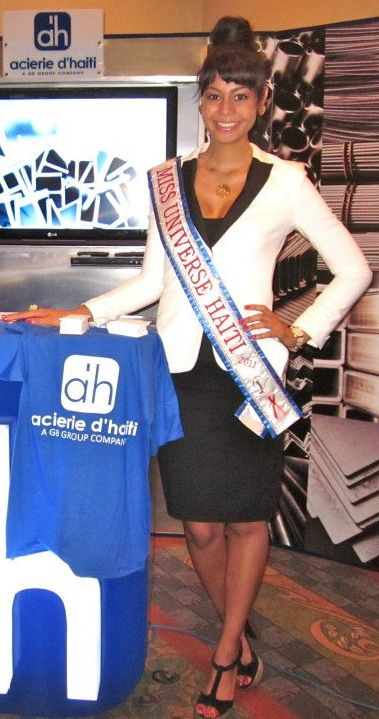
- Born: Anedie Azael; September 15, 1988 (age 38); Port-au-Prince, Haiti
- Height: 1.76 m (5 ft 9 1/2 in)
- Beauty pageant titleholder
- Title: Miss Haiti Universe 2011
- Hair color: Brown
- Eye color: Brown
- Major competitions: Miss Haiti Universe 2011 (Winner); Miss Universe 2011 (unplaced); Miss International 2012 (Top 15)

Anedie Azael (born September 15, 1988) is a Haitian model and activist who won Miss Haiti 2011 and competed in Miss Universe the same year. In 2012, Azael competed in Miss International, becoming the first woman to represent Haiti at the event. She is also known for her humanitarian work, having founded the non-profit charity Peace Love International in 2010.

== Early and personal life ==
Anedie Azael was born on September 15, 1988, in Port-au-Prince to Eddy and Chantale Azael. Azael moved to Miami at the age of 16 to study business management. She graduated from Felix Varela Senior High School in 2006. She then attended Florida State University, where she majored in business management and minored in liberal studies. In 2009, she signed with the Miami-based Runways The Talent Group.

== Humanitarian efforts ==
Following 2010 Haiti earthquake, Azael organised relief efforts for survivors, helping to raise $10 million. After being frequently asked about her charitable organization, she decided to establish her own, launching Peace Love International in August 2010. This organization focuses on aiding women and children. Over time, it expanded its initiatives to include efforts in other countries, such as Ecuador and South Africa. Additionally, Azael serves as an ambassador and head coordinator for the non-profit organization Word and Action, Inc., which aims to prevent child abuse in the United States and Haiti. The organization eventually expanded to offer initiatives in other countries including Ecuador and South Africa.

== Pageantry ==
As a model, she has worked in campaigns for companies such as Carolina Herrera, Dior and Macy's.

On July 27, 2011, Azael won Miss Haiti at the Karibe Convention Center. By winning the contest, she earned the right to represent Haiti at Miss Universe 2011. The latter contest was held in São Paulo, Brazil on September 12, 2011, however Azael failed to place amongst the finalists.

Azael competed in the Miss International 2012 pageant held in Okinawa, Japan, where she placed fifteenth overall. Selected as one of the top fifteen finalists from a field of 92 contestants, she also received the Miss JOICEP special award during the competition. She was the first woman to represent Haiti at a Miss International contest.

== See also ==
Preceded by Sarodj Bertin	Miss Haiti; 2011	Succeeded by Christela Jacques
