= Christela Jacques =

Haitian beauty pageant titleholder

- Born: Christela Jacques; Pétion-Ville, Haiti
- Height: 1.76 m (5 ft 9 1/2 in)
- Beauty pageant titleholder
- Title: Miss Haiti 2012
- Hair color: Black
- Major competitions: Miss Haiti 2012 (Appointed); Miss Universe 2012; Miss Continente Americano 2013

Christela Jacques is a Haitian beauty pageant titleholder was appointed by the organization of Miss Universe Haiti as the Miss Universe Haiti 2012. She was chosen from among other 20 women to take the title. Miss Haiti 2012 and represented her country at the Miss Universe 2012 pageant.

Awards and achievements
Preceded by Anedie Azael	Miss Haiti; 2012	Succeeded by Mondiana Pierre
