= Miss Haiti =

Beauty pageant

Miss Haiti Organization
- Formation: 1920; 106 years ago
- Type: Beauty pageant
- Headquarters: Port-au-Prince
- Location: Haiti
- Members: Miss Universe; Miss Supranational
- Official language: French
- National Director: LuLu Orange (Miss Universe)

The Miss Haiti or Miss Haiti Univers is a national Beauty pageant in Haiti. The pageant was founded in 1920, where the winners were sent to Miss Universe.

== History ==
Historically, the most notable contestants were Evelyn Miot and Gerthie David. On July 14, 1962, Evelyn Miot was the first black contestant to be one of the 15 semi-finalists in the Miss Universe Pageant. This was Miss Haiti's first international meet. Evelyn Miot's placement has been cited as a significant moment in racial integration of international beauty pageants, regarded as a marker in challenging diversity in competition. Gerthie David competed in the Miss Universe Pageant in 1975 and placed in the finals, becoming runner up to Miss Finland, Anne Marie Pohtamo won the 1975 title. In 1975, Gerthie became the second black woman to be placed in the finals. In 1975 Joelle Apollon was declared Miss Haiti World to represent the country in Miss World Pageant, remaining as the fifth finalist, was the only time Haiti sent a candidate to Miss World. The 1968 Miss Haiti Universe delegate, Claudie Paquin, was eliminated in the first round of Miss Universe. The last time Miss Haiti Universe competed in Miss Universe before 2010 was in 1989, the delegate was Glaphyra Jean-Louis.

=== 2010-2015 ===
In 2010, Haiti returned to the Miss Universe pageant under Magali Febles, who was also the franchise holder for Miss Universe in the Dominican Republic. She would end up having the franchise until 2015.

=== 2016-present ===
In 2016, the license of Miss Universe was awarded to Chris Puesan a pageant coach from the Dominican Republic, and end up having the franchise until 2018. Before the creation of Miss Haiti Organization was not common to see Haiti competing in international pageants but after the launch of the national competition Haiti is joining most of the pageants all over the world.

== Pageant format ==
The winner of Miss Haiti is crowned as Miss Universe Haiti and competes at Miss Universe. The remaining contestants continue on to the Miss International contest, whose winner competes as Miss International Haiti.

== Titleholders ==
Year	Miss Haiti	Commune
1920	Maria Bazelais	Port-au-Prince
1948	Paulette Guichard	Port-au-Prince
1960	Claudinette Fourchard	Port-au-Prince
1961	Edna Delinois	Port-au-Prince
1962	Evelyn Miot	Port-au-Prince
1968	Claudie Paquin	Port-au-Prince
1975	Gerthie David	Port-au-Prince
1977	Arielle Jeanty	Port-au-Prince
1985	Arielle Jeanty	Port-au-Prince
1989	Glaphyra Jean-Louis	Port-au-Prince
2010	Sarodj Bertin	Port-au-Prince
2011	Anedie Azael	Port-au-Prince
2012	Christela Jacques	Pétion-Ville
2013	Ketsia Lioudy	Cap-Haïtien
2014	Carolyn Desert	Port-au-Prince
2015	Seydina Allen	Port-au-Prince
2016	Raquel Pélissier	Port-au-Prince
2017	Cassandra Chéry	Port-au-Prince
2018	Samantha Colas	Port-au-Prince
2019	Gabriela Vallejo	Pétion-Ville
2020	Eden Berandoive	Aquin
2021	Pascale Bélony	Cap-Haïtien
2022	Mideline Phelizor	Port-au-Prince
2025	Melissa Sapini	Port-au-Prince
2026	Tatenda Rameau	Syracuse, NY

== Titleholders under Miss Haiti org. ==
=== Miss Universe Haiti ===
- : Declared as Winner
- : Ended as runner-up or top 5/6 qualification
- : Ended as one of the finalists or semifinalists
- : Ended as special awards winner

The following is a list of winners. From 1960 to Present. From 2013 to 2015 the Miss Haiti trademark officially awarded to Miss World Haiti. The winning title to Miss Universe had crowned by Magali Febles (National Director of Miss Haiti Universe between 2010 and 2015). Began 2016 the Miss Haiti Org. and the winner returned to compete at Miss Universe.

Year	Commune	Miss Haiti	Placement at Miss Universe	Special Award(s)	Notes
2026	Syracuse, NY	Tatenda Rameau	TBA		
2025	Port-au-Prince	Melissa Sapini	Unplaced		
Did not compete between 2023—2024
2022	Port-au-Prince	Mideline Phelizor	Top 16		
2021	Cap-Haïtien	Pascale Bélony	Unplaced		
2020	Aquin	Eden Berandoive	Unplaced		Appointed — Due to the impact of COVID-19 pandemic, the Top 5 of 2019 crowned as the Miss Haiti 2020.
2019	Pétion-Ville	Gabriela Vallejo	Unplaced		
2018	Port-au-Prince	Samantha Colas	Unplaced		
2017	Port-au-Prince	Cassandra Chéry	Unplaced		
2016	Port-au-Prince	Raquel Pélissier	1st Runner-up		Chris Puesan directorship.
2015	Port-au-Prince	Lisa Drouillard	Unplaced		
2014	Port-au-Prince	Christie Désir	Unplaced		
2013	Port-au-Prince	Mondiana Pierre	Unplaced		
2012	Pétion-Ville	Christela Jacques	Unplaced		
2011	Port-au-Prince	Anedie Azael	Unplaced		
2010	Port-au-Prince	Sarodj Bertin	Unplaced		Miss Haiti Universe National selection under Magali Febles directorship.
Did not compete between 1990—2009
1989	Port-au-Prince	Glaphyra Jean-Louis	Unplaced		
Did not compete between 1986—1988
1985	Port-au-Prince	Arielle Jeanty	Unplaced		
Did not compete between 1978—1984
1977	Port-au-Prince	Françoise Elie	Unplaced		
1976	Did not compete				
1975	Port-au-Prince	Gerthie David	1st Runner-up		
Did not compete between 1969—1974
1968	Port-au-Prince	Claudie Paquin	Unplaced		
Did not compete between 1963—1967
1962	Port-au-Prince	Evelyn Miot	Top 15		
1961	Port-au-Prince	Edna Delinois	Did not compete		
1960	Port-au-Prince	Claudinette Fourchard	Did not compete		

=== Miss Supranational Haiti ===
- : Declared as Winner
- : Ended as runner-up or top 5/6 qualification
- : Ended as one of the finalists or semifinalists
- : Ended as special awards winner

Year	Commune	Miss Supranational Haiti	Placement at Miss Supranational	Special Award(s)	Notes
2025	Port-au-Prince	Sklouchere Pierre	Unplaced		
2024	Port-au-Prince	Tarah-Lynn Saint-Elien	Unplaced		
2023	Port-au-Prince	Merlie Fleurizard	Unplaced		
2022	Port-au-Prince	Lynn Rubiane St-Germain	Unplaced		
2021	Cap-Haïtien	Pascale Bélony	Top 24		
2019	Port-au-Prince	Schneidine Mondésir	Unplaced		
2018	Port-au-Prince	Mideline Phelizor	Unplaced	Top Model Caribbean	
2016	Gros-Morne	Chrystelle Jean	Unplaced		
2013	Port-au-Prince	Manouchka Luberisse	Unplaced		
2010	Port-au-Prince	Lina Sophie Reyes Duvervielled	Unplaced		

== Past titleholders under Miss Haiti org. ==
=== Miss World Haiti ===
- : Declared as Winner
- : Ended as runner-up or top 5/6 qualification
- : Ended as one of the finalists or semifinalists
- : Ended as special awards winner

From 2013 to 2017 the Miss Haiti trademark officially awarded to Miss Haiti under the directorship of Chris Puesan and Anedie Azael. Began 2018 Haitian representative will select at Miss World Haiti contest.

Year	Commune	Miss World Haiti	Placement at Miss World	Special Award(s)	Notes
2025	Port-au-Prince	Christee Guirand	Top 40		
2023	Pétion-Ville	Valierie Alcide	Unplaced		
2021	Port-au-Prince	Erlande Berger	Unplaced	Head-to-Head Challenge (Round 2)	
2019	Port-au-Prince	Alysha Morency	Unplaced	Miss World Top Model (Top 40)	
2018	Port-au-Prince	Stephie Morency	Unplaced	Miss World Talent (Top 18)	Miss World Haiti Organization independently held the national contest for Miss World pageant.
Did not compete in 2017
2016	Port-au-Prince	Suzana Sampeur	Unplaced		Latest Miss World Haiti under Miss Haiti Organization.
2015	Port-au-Prince	Seydina Allen	Unplaced		
2014	Port-au-Prince	Carolyn Desert	Unplaced	Miss World Top Model (Top 20)	
2013	Cap-Haïtien	Ketsia Lioudy	Unplaced		
Did not compete between 1976—2012
1975	Port-au-Prince	Joelle Apollon	5th Runner-up		

=== Miss International Haiti ===
- : Declared as Winner
- : Ended as runner-up or top 5/6 qualification
- : Ended as one of the finalists or semifinalists
- : Ended as special awards winner

The Miss International Haiti title was awarding to one of runners-up at Miss Haiti pageant. Began 2022 Haitian representative will select in under outside Miss Haiti Organization.

Year	Commune	Miss International Haiti	Placement at Miss International	Special Award(s)	Notes
Did not compete between 2020—Present
2019	Port-au-Prince	Lory-Anne Charles	Unplaced	Best Swimsuit (Top 15)	
2018	Port-au-Prince	Cassandra Chéry	Unplaced		Appointed — Miss Haiti 2017 designated to be Miss International Haiti 2017.
2018	Port-au-Prince	Merlie Fleurizard	Did not compete		Deemed overaged for the international pageant.
2017	Port-au-Prince	Caroline Minerve	Unplaced		
2016	Port-au-Prince	Cassandre Joseph	Unplaced		
2015	Port-au-Prince	Marie Vyannie Menard	Unplaced		
2014	Port-au-Prince	Christie Désir	Unplaced		
2013	Port-au-Prince	Clara Luce Lafond	Unplaced		
2012	Port-au-Prince	Anedie Azael	Top 15	Miss JOICEF	
