= Christie Désir =

Haitian model (born 1993)

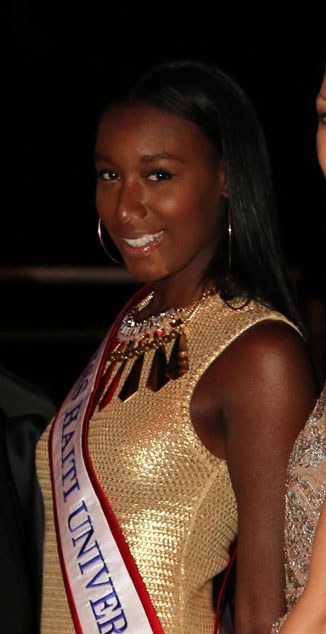
- Désir at the Life Ball in Vienna in 2015
- Born: Christie Désir; February 12, 1993 (age 33); New York City, U.S.
- Height: 5 ft 10 in (1.78 m)
- Beauty pageant titleholder
- Title: Miss International Haiti 2014; Miss Haiti 2014
- Hair color: Black
- Eye color: Brown
- Major competitions: Miss Haiti 2014 (2nd Runner-up) (Miss International Haiti); Miss International 2014; Miss Haiti Universe 2014 (Appointed); Miss Universe 2014 (Unplaced)

Christie Désir (born February 12, 1993) is a Haitian-American actress, model and beauty pageant titleholder who was crowned as Miss Haiti 2014 and competed at Miss Universe 2014 in the USA.

== Early life ==
Desir was born in New York City and holds a BBA in Marketing and a Minor in Fashion Styling. She interned for Sean "Diddy" Combs while attending The Laboratory Institute of Merchandising (L.I.M College). After graduating she worked at Universal Music Group, Interscope Records doing Branded Content and Partnerships, creating advertisement campaigns for artists under the label. Currently, she works closely with an organization to build schools throughout Haiti.

== Pageantry ==
=== Miss Haiti 2014 ===
Previously Désir competed at Miss Haiti 2014 and placed as the 2nd Runner-up. She was designated to compete at Miss International 2014 in Tokyo.

=== Miss International 2014 ===
Désir competed at Miss International 2014 but unplaced.

=== Miss Haiti Universe 2014 ===
Désir was appointed as "Miss Haiti Universe 2014" by Magali Febles as national director in Haiti.

=== Miss Universe 2014 ===
Désir competed at the Miss Universe 2014 pageant but Unplaced.

Awards and achievements
Preceded by Mondiana Pierre	Miss Haiti; 2014	Succeeded by Lisa Drouillard
Preceded by Clara Luce Lafond	Miss International Haiti; 2014	Succeeded by Marie Vyannie Manard
