= Saint-Désir =

- Commune
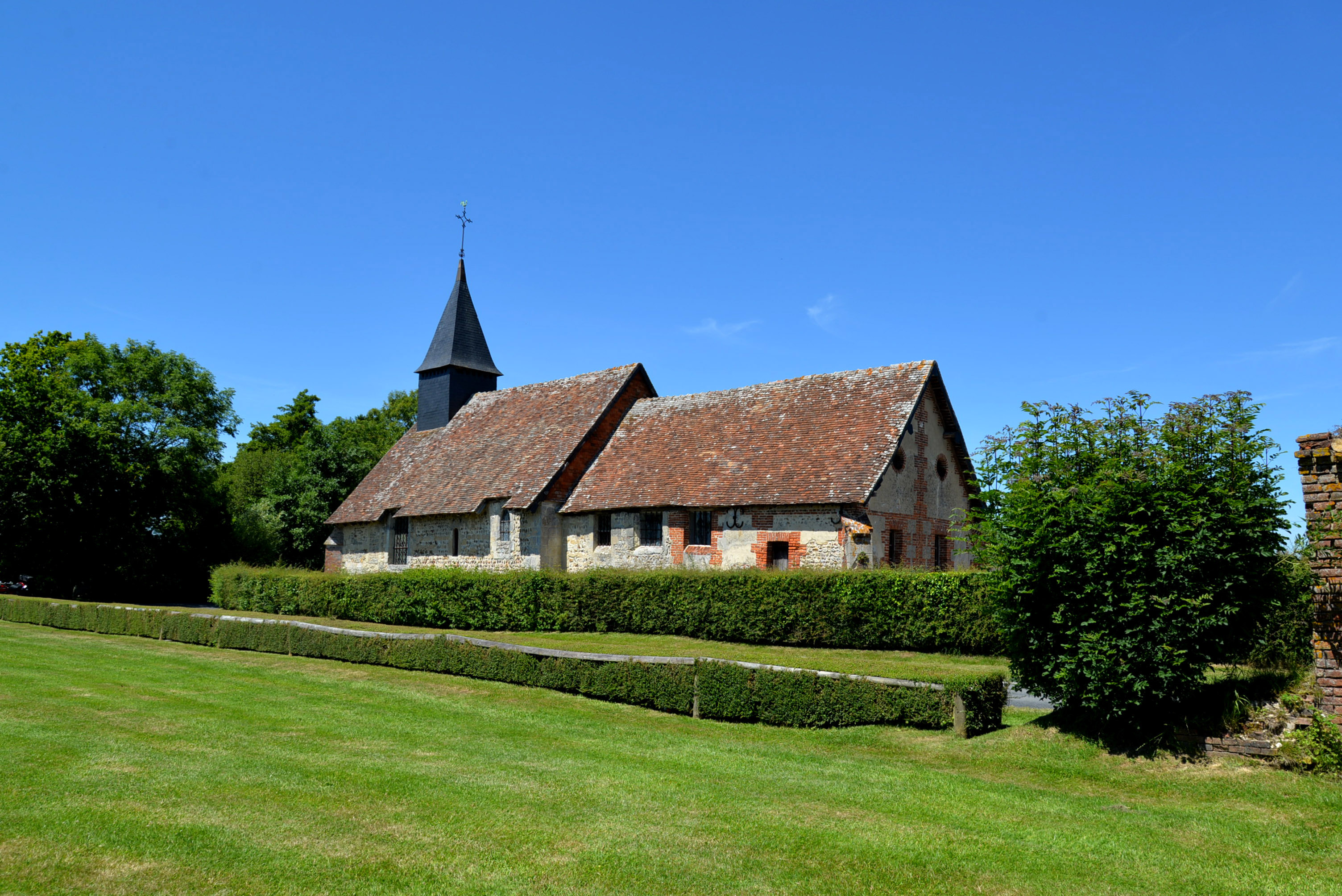
- The church in Saint-Désir

- Coat of arms
- Location of Saint-Désir
- Location within France Location within Normandy
- Coordinates: 49°08′25″N 0°12′42″E
- Country: France
- Region: Normandy
- Department: Calvados
- Arrondissement: Lisieux
- Canton: Mézidon Vallée d'Auge
- Intercommunality: CA Lisieux Normandie

Government
  - Mayor (2020–2026): Dany Targat
- Area^{1}: 19.35 km^{2} (7.47 sq mi)
- Elevation: 60 m (200 ft)
- Highest elevation: 172 m (564 ft)
- Lowest elevation: 42 m (138 ft)
- Population (2023): 1,756
  - Density: 90.75/km^{2} (235.0/sq mi)
- Time zone: UTC+01:00 (CET)
  - Summer (DST): UTC+02:00 (CEST)
- INSEE/Postal code: 14574 /14100
- ^{1} French Land Register data, which excludes lakes, ponds, glaciers > 1 km^{2} (0.386 sq mi or 247 acres) and river estuaries.

Saint-Désir (French pronunciation: [sɛ̃ deziʁ]) is a commune in the Calvados department in the Normandy region in northwestern France.

== Population ==
Historical population
Year	Pop.	±% p.a.
1968	1,254	—
1975	1,448	+2.08%
1982	1,449	+0.01%
1990	1,598	+1.23%
1999	1,701	+0.70%
2007	1,699	−0.01%
2012	1,640	−0.70%
2017	1,710	+0.84%
2023	1,756	+0.44%
Source: INSEE

== See also ==
- Communes of the Calvados department
- Gallo-Roman Theater of Lisieux
- Castellier oppidum
