= Castellier oppidum =

Archaeological site in Normandy, France

- Location within France
- 49°07′53″N 0°10′07″E
- Location: Calvados, Normandy, France

The Castellier oppidum is an archaeological site identified as the main oppidum of the Lexovii during the period of independent Gaul. It is located in the present-day department of Calvados, in the Normandy region of France.

The site was discovered in the early 19th century within the current municipalities of Saint-Désir and Saint-Pierre-des-Ifs. As of the early 21st century, it had been only partially excavated.

== Contexts ==
=== Geography ===
The oppidum is 3 kilometers southwest of Lisieux, occupying a plateau delineated by the Vie and Touques rivers. It is noteworthy that two streams originate within the confines of the oppidum.

The site's natural protection is evident on its southwest, south, and north sides. The oppidum offers a view of an ancient road leading to Jort.

Ancient site of Lisieux.

=== History: The Lexovii ===
The territory of the Lexovii, an ancient tribe, was situated in the Pays d'Auge region, a geographical area located between the Dives and Risle rivers. The primary settlement of the Lexovii underwent a shift in location over time. However, the site of the modern city of Lisieux was already inhabited during the Gallic period, as evidenced by excavations conducted after the 1944 bombings.

The rampart of the oppidum, a fortified settlement, dates back to the La Tène period, a period of significant cultural and historical significance in the region.

The site in question may have been referenced by Julius Caesar in his work Commentaries on the Gallic War (III, 173), specifically in the context of the campaign of Publius Crassus in 56 BC. According to the account, the inhabitants purportedly committed an act of mass violence against their senators and subsequently barricaded their city gates in response to their alliance with the Veneti during a revolt. The senators are believed to have been aligned with the Roman cause.

Patrice Lajoye posits that the city's appellation might have been Rotomagus, a hypothesis derived from a proximate farmstead known as Ferme de Rome.

== History of the site ==
=== Antiquity ===
The site's location on a natural slope break suggests the presence of a sediment layer that was deposited prior to the construction of the embankment. The occupation of the site may be dated to the La Tène period, with its maximum extent occurring during the Late La Tène phase.

The use of iron in construction likely entailed on-site forging, as evidenced by the presence of slag and forge remains. Excavations conducted in the 2000s revealed artifacts from the Late La Tène period, indicating a substantial concentration of remains.

Archaeological excavations have yielded artifacts dating to the 1st century AD, albeit in negligible quantities. Among the artifacts recovered were fragments of Dressel 1 and Greco-Italic ceramic wares.

The site began to decline during the Augustan period with the founding of the new city of Noviomagus Lexoviorum, even though the latter site shows signs of earlier Gallic occupation.

The oppidum was partially dismantled during the reign of Augustus. By the 1st century AD, a villa had been constructed on part of the site. Excavations in 2007, led by Nicola Coulthard, uncovered structures from an Augustan-era construction and a late 1st-century settlement.

=== Post-Antiquity history ===
==== Medieval and modern eras ====
The rampart was leveled to facilitate agriculture.

A tile kiln from the medieval or modern period was uncovered during excavations.

At the center of the oppidum stands the Ferme de la Motte, a group of 16th-century buildings.

==== Archaeological research ====
The site was initially identified by Arcisse de Caumont in 1831, and subsequently by Mortimer Wheeler, who characterized it as the primary oppidum of the Lexovii. In the late 1870s, Louis de Neuville conducted an exploration of the site and documented observations during the demolition of the rampart.

Surveys were conducted in 1996, and trench studies were carried out on the western section in 2005 and the northern area in 2006. No Gallic remains were discovered before the 2000s excavations; however, Gallo-Roman artifacts were found in two fields in 2004.

Two geophysical survey campaigns took place in 2004 and 2005, covering an area of 13 hectares. Test excavations more than 500 meters away were conducted in 2006, uncovering, among other features, postholes. Excavations revealed Iron Age ceramics, possibly produced on-site. A fourth campaign was conducted in 2007, during which two 500-square-meter sectors were excavated. The findings included a cremation grave and a burial, although the bones in the latter had disintegrated.

== Site description ==
The oppidum covers an area of 167 hectares. However, Florence Delacampagne posits that its extent may be as much as 200 hectares. The state of preservation of the rampart varies considerably, with some sections exhibiting signs of erosion, while others remain intact, reaching heights of up to 5 meters.

The oppidum is naturally protected by valleys, except on the north side, where it is defended by a ditch and a rampart.

The rampart is preserved over several kilometers in length.

A section of the rampart has been well-preserved on its western side, particularly at the location designated as La place de la guerre. Observations made during the 19th century identified the rampart as a murus gallicus (a Gallic wall construction technique), a finding substantiated by evidence uncovered during excavations in the 2000s.

The rampart section at La place de la guerre that has been preserved is approximately 2 meters high, and it includes a ditch that is 6 meters wide. On the north side, the rampart is preserved to a height of less than 1 meter.

An embankment measuring 11 meters in width, as ascertained through examination in 2005, yielded charcoal, clay, iron fragments, and rare traces of wooden beams. The rampart's facade may have been adorned with flint stones, a hypothesis substantiated by the presence of debris.

Mortimer Wheeler identified a gate on the western side of the site.

Despite the ambiguity surrounding the layout of the oppidum, evidence suggests the presence of an ancient northwest-southeast axis, which corresponds to the modern La Motte stream.

The 2007 excavations unearthed Gallic structures. The interior space of the oppidum appears to have undergone a process of subdividing through ditches.

== Interpretation ==
During the Late La Tène period, the site encompassed an area of over 10 hectares, a feature that lends credence to the hypothesis that it served as the capital of the Lexovii, as posited by Pierre Giraud.

The presence of imported ceramics led excavators to describe Le Castellier as "one of the sites in Lower Normandy with the largest quantity of imported material."

Archaeological evidence has been unearthed that indicates the presence of grain storage facilities, including granaries. The findings also included artifacts related to ironworking and other craft activities. However, the latter remains unidentified.

== See also ==
- Lexovii

== Bibliography ==
=== General ===
- Fichtl, Stephan (2005). "Murus et pomerium : réflexions sur la fonction des remparts protohistoriques" [Murus and pomerium: reflections on the function of protohistoric ramparts]. Revue archéologique du centre de la France (in French) (44): 55–72.
- Fichtl, Stephan (2005). "Oppidum". L'Archéologue (in French) (108): 12–17.
- Fichtl, Stephan (2010b). "Architecture et fonctions des remparts celtiques" [Architecture and functions of Celtic ramparts]. L'Archéologue (in French) (108): 18–25.
- Kruta, Venceslas (2001). Les Celtes histoire et dictionnaire : Des origines à la romanisation et au christianisme [Celtic history and dictionary: From the origins to Romanization and Christianity]. Bouquins (in French). Paris: Robert Laffont. ISBN 978-2-221-05690-5.
- Kruta, Venceslas (2001). Les Celtes [exposition, Venise, Palazzo Grassi, 1991] [The Celts [exhibition, Venice, Palazzo Grassi, 1991]] (in French). Paris: EDDL. ISBN 2-237-00484-6.

=== Oppidum or Lexovians in antiquity ===
- Cottin, François (1957). "Noviomagus Lexioviorum des temps les plus anciens à la fin de l'époque romaine" [Noviomagus Lexioviorum from earliest times to the end of the Roman era]. Bulletin de la Société des antiquaires de Normandie (in French). LIII (1955–1956): 169–196.
- Delacampagne, Florence (1990). Carte archéologique de la Gaule, 14. Le Calvados [Archaeological map of Gaul, 14. Calvados] (in French). Paris: Éd. de la Maison des sciences de l'homme. ISBN 2-87754-011-1.
- Deniaux, Elisabeth; Lorren, Claude; Bauduin, Pierre; Jarry, Thomas (2002). La Normandie avant les Normands, de la conquête romaine à l'arrivée des Vikings [Normandy before the Normans, from the Roman conquest to the arrival of the Vikings] (in French). Rennes: Ouest-France.
- Giraud, Pierre (2007). "L'oppidum du "Castellier" à Saint-Désir/Saint-Pierre-des-Ifs (14)" [The "Castellier" oppidum at Saint-Désir/Saint-Pierre-des-Ifs (14)]. Bulletin de l'Association française pour l'étude de l'âge du fer (in French) (25): 21–24. Archived from the original on December 5, 2024.
- Giraud, Pierre; Delrieu, Fabien (2008). "Présentation du P.C.R. sur les sites fortifiés protohistoriques de hauteur de Basse Normandie" [Presentation of the P.C.R. on protohistoric fortified sites on the heights of Lower Normandy]. Bulletin de l'Association française pour l'étude de l'âge du fer (in French) (26): 21–22. Archived from the original on March 17, 2024.
- Giraud, Pierre; Coulthard, Nicola (2007). "Saint-Désir – Oppidum du Castellier" [Saint-Désir – Castellier Oppidum]. ADLFI. Archéologie de la France - Informations (in French). doi:10.4000/adlfi.7359. Archived from the original on December 5, 2024.
- Lajoye, Patrice (2012). Religions et cultes à Lisieux (Normandie) dans l'Antiquité et au haut Moyen Âge [Religions and cults in Lisieux (Normandy) in Antiquity and the Early Middle Ages] (in French).
- Lefort, Anthony; Marcigny, Cyril; Méniel, Patrice (2018). "L'occupation militaire romaine préaugustéenne du mont Castel à Port-en-Bessin-Huppain et Commes (Calvados)" [Pre-Augustan Roman military occupation of Mont Castel at Port-en-Bessin-Huppain and Commes (Calvados)]. L'armée romaine en Gaule à l'époque républicaine. Nouveaux témoignages archéologique [The Roman army in Gaul during the Republican era. New archaeological evidence] (in French). pp. 207–248.
- Lemaître, Claude (1985). "Lisieux dans l'Antiquité" [Lisieux in Antiquity]. Art de Basse-Normandie (in French) (89–90–91): 12–29.
- Lannier, Philippe (1985). "Les voies de communication antiques de la cité des Lexovii" [The ancient communication routes of the Lexovii city]. Annales de Normandie (in French). 35 (3): 207–227. doi:10.3406/annor.1985.1677. Archived from the original on March 17, 2024.
- Paillard, M (1998). "Un suburbium à Lisieux" [A suburbium in Lisieux]. Dossiers d'Archéologie (in French) (237): 52–57.
- Giraud, Pierre; Marcigny, Cyril (2011). L'âge du Fer en Basse-Normandie-Gestes funéraires en Gaule au Second-Âge du Fer [The Iron Age in Lower Normandy-Funeral gestures in Gaul during the Second Iron Age] (in French). Vol. I, II. Besançon: Presses universitaires de Franche-Comté. ISBN 978-2-84867-314-1. Archived from the original on September 5, 2024.
