= John Bassett Theatre =

Theatre in Toronto, Ontario, Canada

Coordinates: 43°38′39″N 79°23′12″W

The John W. H. Bassett Theatre is a multi-purpose theatre located in downtown Toronto, Ontario, Canada on Front Street, in the Metro Toronto Convention Centre. The theatre is regularly used by the CTV Television Network for television shows such as Canadian Idol and Canada's Got Talent.

The 1,232 seat, multi-purpose theatre is a self-contained venue within the Metro Toronto Convention Centre's North Building. The adjacent rooms host pre-and post-performance receptions. The theatre also hosts corporate events, a number of nationally televised award shows, community events and national and international TV specials.

The theatre was named for John W. H. Bassett, the founder of Baton Broadcasting, the main predecessor of Bell Media, parent of the CTV Television Network. Since 2003 the theatre has been regularly used by CTV for programs such as Canadian Idol and was used in December 2011 for the Toronto Canada's Got Talent auditions.

During the late 1990s, Thúy Nga has used the theatre several times to produce, perform, and tape Paris by Night.
