= Lauren Howe (model) =

Canadian actress, TV host, model and beauty pageant titleholder (born 1993)

- Born: Lauren Howe; 7 July 1993 (age 33); Toronto, Ontario, Canada
- Education: University of Toronto Faculty of Applied Science and Engineering
- Height: 1.75 m (5 ft 9 in)
- Beauty pageant titleholder
- Title: Miss Teen Canada World 2011 Miss Universe Canada 2017
- Hair colour: Blonde
- Eye colour: Blue
- Major competitions: Miss Teen Canada World 2011 (Winner); Miss Teen World 2012 (4th Runner-Up); Miss Universe Canada 2014 (2nd Runner-Up); Miss Universe Canada 2017 (Winner); Miss Universe 2017 (Top 10)

Lauren Howe (born July 7, 1993) is a Canadian actress, television show host, model and beauty pageant titleholder. She won the title of Miss Universe Canada 2017 and placed in the top 10 at the Miss Universe 2017. She has also worked in the television industry, appearing on various programs and acting in several productions.

Lauren is currently a correspondent for Citytv in Toronto, Ontario, predominantly for CityLine and Breakfast Television. She co-hosted the Canadian Broadcast Coverage of the 61st Annual Grammy Awards with Tracy Moore and Devo Brown.

== Early life ==
Born in Toronto, Canada, Lauren is of French, German and Ukrainian heritage. She was raised as an only child by a single mother, and later studied industrial engineering at the University of Toronto. While in college, she was named one of the "Top Ten Female Students to Watch".

== Career ==
=== Pageantry ===
After joining the Miss Teen Canada pageant in 2011 for scholarship opportunities, Lauren went on to compete at Miss Teen World, placing in the top 5. She used her platform to support women pursuing education and careers in STEM fields. She later ran for Miss Universe Canada in 2014, where she finished as the 2nd runner-up to Chanel Beckenlehner.

Howe was crowned Miss Universe Canada 2017 on October 7, 2017 by Siera Bearchell and placed in the Top 10 at the Miss Universe 2017 pageant in Las Vegas in November.

=== Hosting and television ===
While in university, she worked as the In-Arena Host for the Toronto Maple Leafs from 2014 to 2016. Howe has hosted other live events including the IIHF World U20 Championship, 2015 Pan American Games, Invictus Games and Rogers Cup.

In 2016, she became a correspondent for Citytv, co-hosting the Canadian National Broadcast of the 61st Annual Grammy Awards. She regularly appears on Breakfast Television, CityLine and has guest hosted Breakfast Television.

=== Acting and modeling ===
She is a model with Sutherland Models and an actress with Butler Ruston Bell.

== Personal life ==
In September 2023, Howe announced her engagement to Brayden Irwin.

Awards and achievements
Preceded by Siera Bearchell	Miss Universe Canada; 2017	Succeeded by Marta Stepien
