= Lateesha Ector =

Canadian model (born 1984)

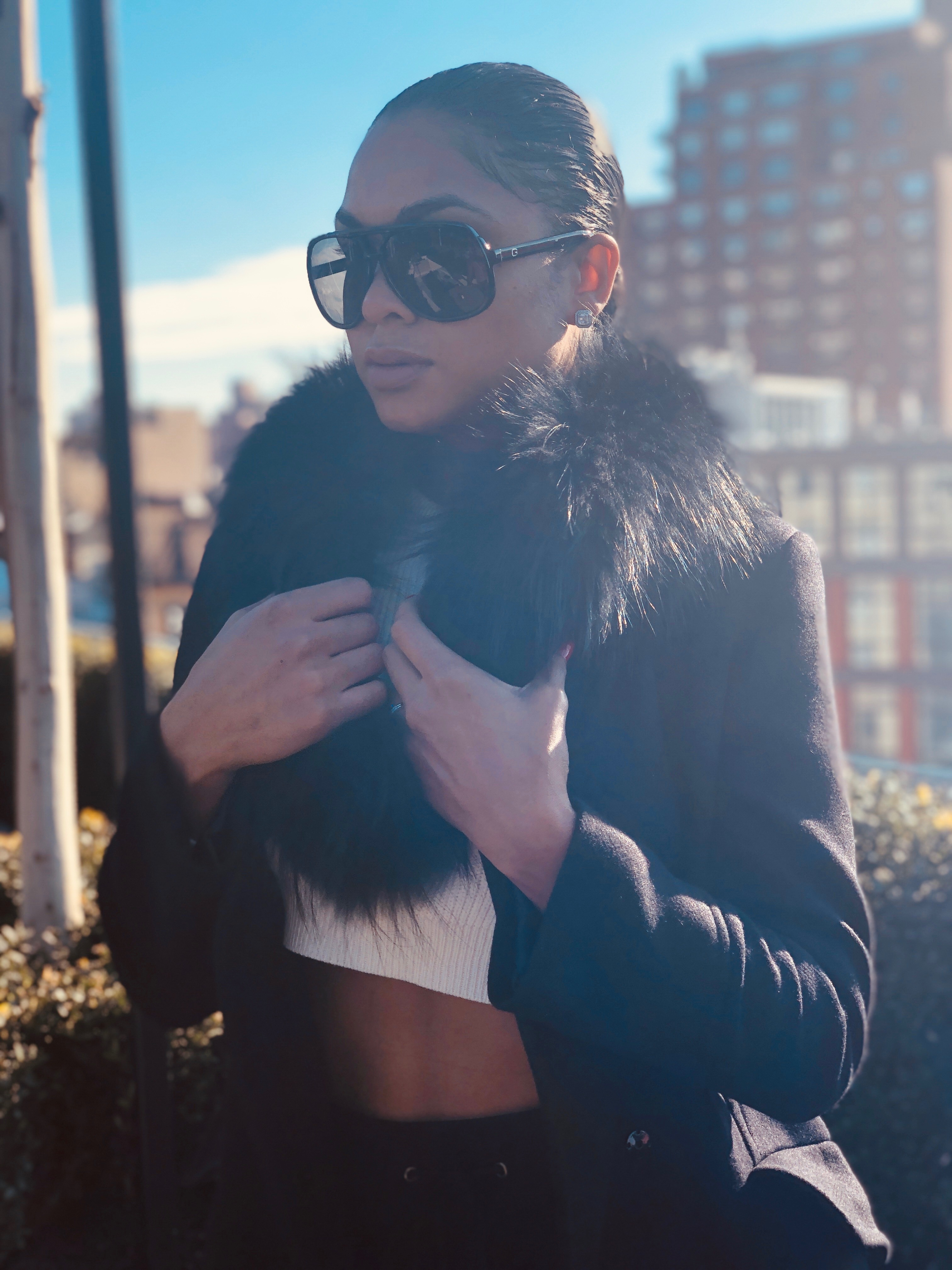
- Born: Lateesha Ector; 1984 (age 41–42); Montreal, Quebec, Canada
- Height: 1.77 m (5 ft 9 1/2 in)
- Beauty pageant titleholder
- Title: Miss Earth Canada 2009
- Hair colour: Black
- Eye colour: Brown
- Major competitions: Miss Universe Canada 2008 (Top 20); Miss Earth Canada 2009 (Winner); Miss Earth 2009 (Unplaced)

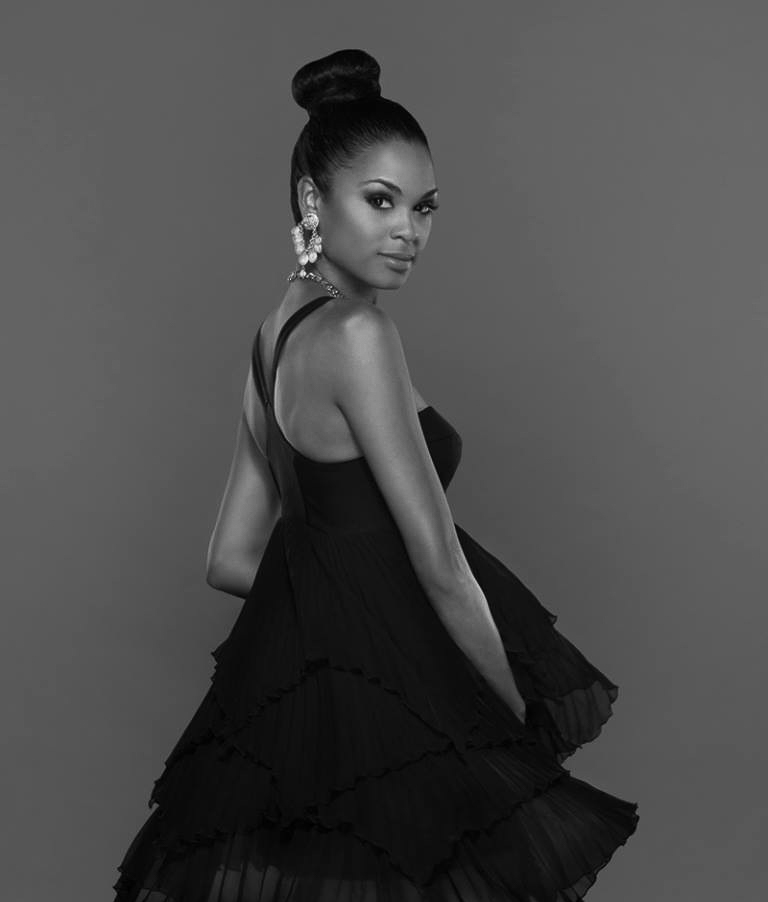

Lateesha Ector (born 1984) is a Canadian fashion model and beauty pageant titleholder who was crowned Miss Earth Canada 2009 and represented her country at Miss Earth 2009. She is the first Black woman crowned Miss Earth Canada. She represented Canada in Miss Earth 2009.

== Background ==
Ector was born in Montreal, Quebec. Ector's parents are from Trinidad and Tobago and have heritage from Black, Chinese, Scottish, and Venezuelan backgrounds. As a young girl she was involved in classical ballet, and earned a Bachelor's degree in psychology from Concordia University. She currently lives in Montreal, Quebec.

== Miss Universe Canada 2008 ==
Ector, who stands 5 ft 9.5 in (1.77 m) tall, competed in the 57th annual Miss Universe Canada, where she placed in the top 15, won by Samantha Tajik, on April 28, 2008, at the Winter Garden Theatre, on Yonge St., Toronto, Ontario, Canada. She placed in the top 20 semifinalist, which was participated by 62 contestants from across Canada.

== Miss Earth 2009 ==
On August 22, 2009, Ector was crowned as Miss Earth Canada at Les Cours Mont-Royal in Quebec. She represented Canada in the ninth edition of Miss Earth beauty pageant in the Philippines on November 22, 2009. She placed Canada in the top 15 for talent competition and in the swimwear competition. The Miss Earth winner serves as the spokesperson for the Miss Earth Foundation, the United Nations Environment Programme (UNEP) and other environmental organizations.

== See also ==
- Miss Earth
- Miss Earth 2009

Preceded by Denise Garrido	Miss Earth Canada; 2009	Succeeded by Incumbent
