= The Beaverton =

Canadian satirical newspaper

- Type: Parody news publication
- Format: Tabloid and website
- Owner: The Beaverton
- Editor: Luke Gordon Field, Aaron Hagey-MacKay, Alex Huntley, Alexander Saxton, Jacob Duarte Spiel, Laurent Noonan, Emma Overton
- Founded: 2010
- Headquarters: Toronto, Ontario; Montreal, Quebec; Whitehorse, Yukon
- Website: thebeaverton.com

The Beaverton is a primarily online Canadian news satire publication, based in Toronto, Montreal and Whitehorse. It features news stories, editorials, vox populi and other formats (such as university reviews) whose structure and layout mirror those of conventional newspapers but whose content is contorted to make humorous commentary on Canadian and world issues. It has been compared to The Onion.

The publication was founded in 2010 by Queen's University alumni Luke Gordon Field, Alex Huntley and University of Toronto graduate Laurent Noonan (1982–2014).

== Reception and believability ==
Several of The Beaverton's articles have been reported as real news. In May 2013, a story on Chris Hadfield's return to Earth and being greeted with a $1.3 million bill for cellphone roaming fees after spending several months in space received more than 400,000 hits. The story was reported as real news by Hong Kong newspaper Ming Pao.

In July 2013, a story about an English-speaking parrot being removed from Montreal's Biodome because it did not speak French during a government inspection was similarly received; according to The Economist it "shocked many Canadians" but "turned out to be a spoof."

The Beaverton has also been noted for its stories on Canadian politics. During Stephen Harper's Official visit to Israel in January 2014, the publication mocked the Canadian Prime Minister's unflinching support of Israel by reporting that he was the Israeli Prime Minister returning from Canada after a long visit.

In September 2015, the site published an article which used Ashley Callingbull's crowning as Mrs. Universe to comment on the media's failure to adequately cover the issue of missing and murdered aboriginal women. After being criticized by Aboriginal groups, the article was pulled from the site and an apology was posted on The Beaverton's Facebook page.

In May 2016, the Hamilton Spectator made reference to a Beaverton article as factual in an editorial about the entire New Democratic Party caucus appearing in neck braces and wheelchairs after the infamous elbowgate incident. The Spectator changed the editorial, but did not issue a formal retraction.

Starting in October 2016 the site has been granted day passes by the Parliamentary Press Gallery, which allow writers increased access to Parliament but not full access granted to full-time Parliamentary journalists.

In November 2025, Time Magazine included a quote from a Beaverton article as part of a story on Pete Hoekstra, and later issued a correction.

== Other media ==
In 2017, Luke Gordon Field and Alex Huntley released a satirical look at Canadian history, The Beaverton Presents: Glorious and/or Free: The ~~True~~ History of Canada, published by Penguin Canada.

The Beaverton TV series debuted on The Comedy Network in November 2016, and as of November 2019 had aired three seasons.

== See also ==
- List of satirical magazines
- List of satirical news websites
- List of satirical television news programs
