= Miss Universe Canada 2008 =

Canadian female beauty pageant held in Toronto, Ontario

- Date: April 28, 2008
- Presenters: Fernando Balbontin
- Venue: John Bassett Theatre, Toronto, Ontario
- Entrants: 70
- Placements: 20
- Winner: Samantha Tajik (British Columbia) Upper Canada

Miss Universe Canada 2008 was the 6th Miss Universe Canada pageant held on April 28, 2008 in Toronto, Ontario. Inga Skaya of Ontario crowned her successor Samantha Tajik of Upper Canada with 70 women competing in the pageant.

== Results ==
Final results	Contestant	Results
Miss Universe Canada 2008	(British Columbia) Upper Canada - Samantha Tajik	Unplaced
1st Runner-up	British Columbia Province - Sahar Biniaz	
2nd Runner-up	North Ontario - Aleksandra Malkin	
3rd Runner-up	(British Columbia) Langley - Lina Lombana	
4th Runner-up	(Ontario) Scarborough - Genida Prifti	
Top 10	Lower Alberta - Stephanie Koo; National Capital Region - Taryn Scerbo; Ontario Province - Elena Semikina; Southeast Canada - Elena Tchemissova; Southeast Ontario - Klaudia Olejnik	
Top 20	(British Columbia) Burnaby - Ania Bureacenco (British Columbia) Burrard Peninsula - Agnes Kim; Montreal - Dayna Hajaly (British Columbia) North Vancouver - Sarah Khoshnavazi; Quebec Province - Lateesha Ector; Southwest Ontario - Anastasia Marinina; Toronto - Lyudmyla Tregubenko (British Columbia) West Coast - Lauren McKamey; East Quebec - Valerie Welsh; West Ontario - Vanessa Drautz	

=== Special awards ===
- Miss Congeniality - Pauline Ranjbar (North Quebec)
- Miss Photogenic - Cynthia O'Poole (New Brunswick Province)

== Order of announcement ==
=== Top 5 ===
1. Langley
2. North Ontario
3. Lower Alberta
4. Scarborough
5. British Columbia Province
6. Upper Canada

=== Top 10 ===
1. Langley
2. North Ontario
3. Upper Canada
4. Southeast Ontario
5. British Columbia Province
6. Southeast Canada
7. Scarborough
8. Ontario Province
9. Lower Alberta
10. National Capital Region

=== Top 20 ===
1. Burnaby
2. West Ontario
3. National Capital Region
4. Quebec Province
5. British Columbia Province
6. Montreal
7. Toronto
8. Southeast Canada
9. Upper Canada
10. West Coast
11. Burrard Peninsula
12. Langley
13. Southwest Ontario
14. Lower Alberta
15. North Ontario
16. Southeast Ontario
17. North Vancouver
18. East Quebec
19. Scarborough
20. Ontario Province

== Contestants ==
Represented	Name	Age	Height	Hometown
Alberta Province	Anindita Mukherjee	23	1.72 m (5 ft 8 in)	Calgary
(Quebec) Atlantic Coast	Sarah Foot	24	1.73 m (5 ft 8 in)	Oyen
British Columbia Province	Sahar Biniaz	22	1.73 m (5 ft 8 in)	Vancouver
(British Columbia) Burnaby	Ania Bureacenco	20	1.76 m (5 ft 9 in)	Burnaby
(British Columbia) Burrard Peninsula	Agnes Kim	24	1.65 m (5 ft 5 in)	Pitt Meadows
(Alberta) Calgary	Alexandria Wiemer	24	1.70 m (5 ft 7 in)	Calgary
(Manitoba) Central Canada	Jennifer Albertson	20	1.72 m (5 ft 8 in)	Winnipeg
Central Ontario	Connie D’Angelo	23	1.65 m (5 ft 5 in)	Ottawa
(Prince Edward Island) Charlottetown	Denisse Rafael	18	1.70 m (5 ft 7 in)	Charlottetown
(British Columbia) Coldstream	Courtney Liefke	20	1.73 m (5 ft 8 in)	Coldstream
(Quebec) East Canada	Mona Nikkah	21	1.70 m (5 ft 7 in)	Montreal
East Ontario	Sharon Philipose	21	1.68 m (5 ft 6 in)	Ottawa
East Quebec	Valerie Welsh	20	1.75 m (5 ft 9 in)	Saint-Nicolas
(Alberta) Edmonton	Kriti Bhatnagar	22	1.70 m (5 ft 7 in)	Edmonton
(British Columbia) Fraser Valley	Sabrina Haloulakos	21	1.65 m (5 ft 5 in)	Burnaby
(New Brunswick) Fredericton	Annie Franklin	23	1.81 m (5 ft 11 in)	Fredericton
(Nova Scotia) Halifax	Cara Elizabeth Tanner	19	1.80 m (5 ft 11 in)	Halifax
(Quebec) Hochelaga Archipelago	Cynthia Ponari	18	1.70 m (5 ft 7 in)	Montreal
(British Columbia) Langley	Lina Lombana	19	1.75 m (5 ft 9 in)	Langley
Lower Alberta	Stephanie Koo	26	1.68 m (5 ft 6 in)	Calgary
(New Brunswick) Lower Canada	Marlene Snowfoot	21	1.74 m (5 ft 9 in)	Fredericton
(British Columbia) Lower Mainland	Sasha Abunnadi	24	1.65 m (5 ft 5 in)	Abbotsford
Manitoba Province	Jessica Clausen	19	1.65 m (5 ft 5 in)	Winnipeg
(Ontario) Mississauga	Olga Tchistilina	26	1.75 m (5 ft 9 in)	Mississauga
(Quebec) Montreal	Dayna Hajaly	19	1.75 m (5 ft 9 in)	Montreal
(Ontario) National Capital Region	Taryn Scerbo	23	1.73 m (5 ft 8 in)	Ottawa
New Brunswick Province	Cynthia O'Poole	18	1.77 m (5 ft 10 in)	Fredericton
(Quebec) New France	Sara-Jade Doucet Gallienne	19	1.73 m (5 ft 8 in)	Bécancour
(Newfoundland and Labrador) Newfoundland & Labrador Province	Katie Flood	25	1.75 m (5 ft 9 in)	St. John's
(Quebec) North Canada	Sonja McCree	25	1.70 m (5 ft 7 in)	Pointe-Claire
North Ontario	Aleksandra Malkin	20	1.80 m (5 ft 11 in)	Concord
North Quebec	Pauline Ranjbar	21	1.68 m (5 ft 6 in)	Dollard-des-Ormeaux
(British Columbia) North Vancouver	Sarah Khoshnavazi	20	1.68 m (5 ft 6 in)	North Vancouver
(Quebec) Northeast Canada	Joelle Lanctot	19	1.68 m (5 ft 6 in)	Saint-Michel
Northwest Ontario	Kimberly Dubeau	23	1.73 m (5 ft 8 in)	Kapuskasing
Northwest Territories	Geneve Clarke	19	1.78 m (5 ft 10 in)	Yellowknife
Nova Scotia Province	Anne-Louis Fremont	18	1.77 m (5 ft 10 in)	Halifax
Nunavut Territory	Lee Kuusaag	18	1.76 m (5 ft 9 in)	Iqaluit
Ontario Province	Elena Semikina	24	1.85 m (6 ft 1 in)	Toronto
(British Columbia) Pacific Coast	Karelya Medialdea	24	1.69 m (5 ft 7 in)	Abbotsford
(British Columbia) Peace River Country	Maria Woodward	21	1.68 m (5 ft 6 in)	Campbell River
(Quebec) Port Moody	Sabrina Misquita	21	1.68 m (5 ft 6 in)	LaSalle
(British Columbia) Port Moody	Tanya Razi	19	1.71 m (5 ft 7 in)	Port Moody
(Prince Edward Island) Prince Edward Province	Andrea Martin	20	1.79 m (5 ft 10 in)	Charlottetown
Quebec Province	Lateesha Ector	23	1.79 m (5 ft 10 in)	Pierrefonds
(British Columbia) Saanich Peninsula	Chelsea Tail Feathers	19	1.70 m (5 ft 7 in)	Stand Off, Alberta
Saskatchewan Province	Ann Parry	25	1.76 m (5 ft 9 in)	Saskatoon
(Saskatchewan) Saskatoon	Shannon Smadella	26	1.65 m (5 ft 5 in)	Saskatoon
(Ontario) Scarborough	Genida Prifti	24	1.83 m (6 ft 0 in)	Scarborough
South Alberta	Adwoa Yamoah	21	1.75 m (5 ft 9 in)	Calgary
(Ontario) South Canada	Brittney Kuczynski	18	1.71 m (5 ft 7 in)	Mississauga
South Ontario	Sharon Persaud	26	1.68 m (5 ft 6 in)	Etobicoke
South Quebec	Sarah Philibert	19	1.73 m (5 ft 8 in)	Bécancour
(Ontario) Southeast Canada	Elena Tchemissova	23	1.70 m (5 ft 7 in)	Toronto
Southeast Ontario	Klaudia Olejnik	20	1.71 m (5 ft 7 in)	Toronto
(British Columbia) Southwest Canada	Stephanie Ataliotis	20	1.75 m (5 ft 9 in)	Vancouver
Southwest Ontario	Anastasia Marinina	20	1.76 m (5 ft 9 in)	Mississauga
(British Columbia) Surrey	Amy Toor	25	1.73 m (5 ft 8 in)	Surrey
(Alberta) The Prairies	Shannon MacKinnon	23	1.71 m (5 ft 7 in)	Edmonton
(Alberta) The Rockies	Jennyfer Boyce	26	1.65 m (5 ft 5 in)	Calgary
(Ontario) Toronto	Lyudmyla Tregubenko	24	1.73 m (5 ft 8 in)	Toronto
Upper Alberta	Allison Stern	22	1.66 m (5 ft 5 in)	Sherwood Park
(British Columbia) Upper Canada	Samantha Tajik	25	1.78 m (5 ft 10 in)	Vancouver
(British Columbia) Vancouver	Sarah Fullerton	25	1.73 m (5 ft 8 in)	Vancouver
(British Columbia) West Canada	Emily Hoddinott	22	1.65 m (5 ft 5 in)	Prince George
(British Columbia) West Coast	Lauren McKamey	23	1.83 m (6 ft 0 in)	Port Alberni
West Ontario	Vanessa Drautz	24	1.70 m (5 ft 7 in)	Mississauga
West Quebec	Katherine Raymond	20	1.70 m (5 ft 7 in)	Lorraine
(Manitoba) Winnipeg	Ines Falcon	25	1.73 m (5 ft 8 in)	Winnipeg
Yukon Territory	Sarah Pool	21	1.82 m (6 ft 0 in)	Whitehorse

== Notes ==
- Lateesha Ector competed at Miss Earth 2009, she was unplaced.
- Sahar Biniaz competed at Miss Tourism Queen International 2008, she was the 2nd Runner-up.
- Elena Semikina represented Canada in Miss International 2008, she was unplaced.
