= Chanel Beckenlehner =

Canadian beauty pageant competitor

- Born: Chanel Beckenlehner; September 9, 1988 (age 38); Caledon, Ontario, Canada
- Height: 1.72 m (5 ft 7 1/2 in)
- Beauty pageant titleholder
- Title: Miss Continente Americano Canada 2010; Miss Universe Canada 2014
- Hair colour: Dark Brown
- Eye colour: Green
- Major competitions: Miss Universe Canada 2009 (Top 12); Miss International 2009 (Top 15); Miss Continente Americano 2010 (Unplaced); Miss Universe Canada 2014 (Winner); Miss Universe 2014 (Unplaced)

Chanel Beckenlehner (born September 9, 1988) is a Canadian-German beauty pageant titleholder who was crowned Miss Universe Canada 2014 and represented Canada at the Miss Universe 2014 pageant.

== Early life ==
Chanel Beckenlehner attended the University of Toronto, and completed her bachelor's degree in political science.

== Pageantry ==
=== Miss Universe Canada 2009 ===
Beckenlehner was crowned the Miss International Canada title of the Miss Universe Canada 2009 and placed in the top 12 at the pageant. Meanwhile, the official winner that year was Mariana Valente from Richmond Hill, Ontario, who took the crown and represented Canada at Miss Universe 2009 in Nassau, Bahamas.

=== Miss International 2009 ===
Beckenlehner was appointed as the official representative of Canada for Miss International 2009 in Chengdu, China and placed in the Top 15 where Anagabriela Espinoza of Mexico was crowned Miss International 2009.

=== Miss Universe Canada 2014 ===
Beckenlehner continued to compete in 2014 and won the title of Miss Universe Canada 2014, representing Caledon. She later represented Canada at Miss Universe 2014, which was held in Doral, Florida, US, but did not make the Top 15. She did, however, make the Top 5 in the National Costume competition.

Awards and achievements
| Preceded by Riza Santos | Miss Universe Canada; 2014 | Succeeded by Paola Nunez |
