= Miss Universe Canada 2016 =

- Date: June 11, 2016
- Venue: St. Lawrence Centre for the Arts, Toronto
- Entrants: 64
- Placements: 20
- Winner: Siera Bearchell; Saskatchewan
- Congeniality: Darya Khosravi; Richmond Hill
- Photogenic: Siera Bearchell; Saskatchewan

Miss Universe Canada 2016 was the 14th Miss Universe Canada pageant, held at the St. Lawrence Centre for the Arts in Toronto, Canada, on June 11, 2016.

At the end of the event, Siera Bearchell of Saskatchewan was crowned Miss Universe Canada 2016, Bearchell represented Canada at the Miss Universe 2016 pageant, and placed in the top nine.

== Results ==
=== Placements ===
Placement	Contestant
Miss Universe Canada 2016	Saskatchewan – Siera Bearchell
1st Runner-Up (Miss International Canada 2016)	Amherstburg – Amber Bernachi
2nd Runner-Up	Etobicoke – Kesiah Papasin
3rd Runner-Up	Southwest Toronto – Camila Gonzalez
4th Runner-Up	Atlantic Canada – Zoe Bennett
Top 12	Oakville – Alexis Lopez; North Calgary – Brittany Michalchuk; Pacific Canada – Sian Slingerland; South Edmonton – Natalie Zaiffdeen; South Ontario – Catherine Valle; Thunder Bay – Sabrina Felice; Vancouver – Laura Guzman
Top 20	Alberta Province – Vanessa Chauhan; British Columbia Province – Shayna Ding; Central Canada – Elizabeth Quan; Iroquois Falls – Natalie Carriere; North Ontario – Melinda Henderson; Richmond Hill – Darya Khosravi; Saskatoon – Jillian Martin; West Ontario – Ninela Sanchez

=== Special awards ===
Final results	Contestant
Miss Congeniality	Darya Khosravi (Richmond Hill)
Miss Photogenic	Siera Bearchell (Saskatchewan Province)

== Order of Announcement ==
=== Top 5 ===
1. Southwest Toronto
2. Amherstburg
3. Etobicoke
4. Atlantic Canada
5. Saskatchewan Province

=== Top 12 ===
1. Etobicoke
2. Pacific Canada
3. Southwest Toronto
4. North Calgary
5. Atlantic Canada
6. South Ontario
7. Saskatchewan Province
8. Thunder Bay
9. South Edmonton
10. Vancouver
11. Oakville
12. Amherstburg

=== Top 20 ===
1. Vancouver
2. North Calgary
3. Richmond Hill
4. Alberta Province
5. North Ontario
6. West Ontario
7. Oakville
8. Southwest Toronto
9. Etobicoke
10. Pacific Canada
11. Iroquois Falls
12. Amherstburg
13. Central Canada
14. Saskatchewan Province
15. Thunder Bay
16. British Columbia Province
17. South Edmonton
18. Atlantic Canada
19. Saskatoon
20. South Ontario

== Official Delegates ==
Meet the national delegates competing for the title of Miss Universe Canada 2016:

Represents	Contestant	Age	Height	Hometown
Alberta Province	Vanessa Chauhan	23	1.68 m (5 ft 6 in)	Fort McMurray
(Ontario) Amherstburg	Amber Bernachi	25	1.65 m (5 ft 5 in)	Amherstburg
(Ontario) Atlantic Canada	Zoe Bennett	24	1.69 m (5 ft 6 1/2 in)	Windsor
(Ontario) Brampton	Nav Sidhu	24	1.73 m (5 ft 8 in)	Brampton
British Columbia Province	Shayna Ding	21	1.70 m (5 ft 7 in)	Richmond
(Quebec) Brossard	Diana-Luk Ye	19	1.74 m (5 ft 8 1/2 in)	Brossard
(Ontario) Burlington	Kayce Cooper	19	1.70 m (5 ft 7 in)	Burlington
(Ontario) Central Canada	Elizabeth Quan	23	1.76 m (5 ft 9 1/2 in)	Toronto
(Ontario) Central Toronto	Priya Singh	21	1.73 m (5 ft 8 in)	Toronto
(Ontario) East Canada	Leigha Vegh	23	1.83 m (6 ft 0 in)	Toronto
East Ontario	Kimiya Zamani	27	1.73 m (5 ft 8 in)	Richmond Hill
(Ontario) East Toronto	Laura Luu	25	1.68 m (5 ft 6 in)	Toronto
(Ontario) Etobicoke	Kesiah Papasin	25	1.70 m (5 ft 7 in)	Etobicoke
(Alberta) Grande Prairie	Kelsey Baile	25	1.68 m (5 ft 6 in)	Grande Prairie
(Ontario) Hamilton	Cassandra Paonessa	27	1.68 m (5 ft 6 in)	Hamilton
(Ontario) Harrow	Felicity Slikboer	25	1.71 m (5 ft 7 1/2 in)	Harrow
(Ontario) Iroquois Falls	Natalie Carriere	21	1.85 m (6 ft 1 in)	Iroquois Falls
(Ontario) Leamington	Jessica Goncalves	18	1.70 m (5 ft 7 in)	Leamington
(Ontario) London	Clariza Lopez Landaverde	18	1.76 m (5 ft 9 1/2 in)	London
(Ontario) Lower Canada	Nataliya Yavorska	25	1.75 m (5 ft 9 in)	Toronto
Manitoba Province	Chrystalle Omaga	26	1.79 m (5 ft 10 1/2 in)	Winnipeg
(Ontario) Markham	Evelyn Li	22	1.76 m (5 ft 9 1/2 in)	Markham
(Ontario) Mississauga	Megha Patel	23	1.69 m (5 ft 6 1/2 in)	Mississauga
(Quebec) Montréal	Cynthia Ayoub	21	1.74 m (5 ft 8 1/2 in)	Montréal
(Ontario) Niagara Falls	Yirah Corona	20	1.65 m (5 ft 5 in)	Niagara Falls
(Alberta) North Calgary	Brittany Michalchuk	22	1.70 m (5 ft 7 in)	Calgary
(Alberta) North Edmonton	Vibhu Kher	25	1.66 m (5 ft 5 1/2 in)	Edmonton
North Ontario	Melinda Henderson	26	1.77 m (5 ft 9 1/2 in)	Thunder Bay
(Ontario) North Toronto	Sindy Nguyen	24	1.66 m (5 ft 5 1/2 in)	Toronto
Northwest Territories	Maryann Valch	23	1.82 m (5 ft 11 1/2 in)	Yellowknife
(Ontario) Oakville	Alexis Lopez	26	1.71 m (5 ft 7 1/2 in)	Oakville
Ontario Province	Swati Abrol	25	1.67 m (5 ft 5 1/2 in)	Ottawa
(British Columbia) Pacific Canada	Sian Slingerland	19	1.76 m (5 ft 9 1/2 in)	Sechelt
(Ontario) Port Credit	Monisola Ogunsuyi	24	1.72 m (5 ft 7 1/2 in)	Port Credit
Quebec Province	Naderge Baptiste	25	1.67 m (5 ft 5 1/2 in)	Montréal
(Ontario) Richmond Hill	Darya Khosravi	23	1.73 m (5 ft 8 in)	Richmond Hill
Saskatchewan Province	Siera Bearchell	23	1.77 m (5 ft 9 1/2 in)	Moose Jaw
(Saskatchewan) Saskatoon	Jillian Martin	19	1.81 m (5 ft 11 1/2 in)	Saskatoon
(Alberta) South Calgary	Aylar Macky	23	1.73 m (5 ft 8 in)	Calgary
(Ontario) South Canada	Monique Johnston	20	1.76 m (5 ft 9 1/2 in)	Brampton
(Alberta) South Edmonton	Natalie Zaiffdeen	21	1.66 m (5 ft 5 1/2 in)	Edmonton
South Ontario	Catherine Valle	23	1.69 m (5 ft 6 1/2 in)	Leamington
South Saskatchewan	Morvarid Akhgar	24	1.65 m (5 ft 5 in)	Saskatoon
(Ontario) South Toronto	Sara Poonia	20	1.66 m (5 ft 5 1/2 in)	Toronto
Southeast Ontario	Shanacee Shreve	23	1.65 m (5 ft 5 in)	Windsor
(Ontario) Southwest Toronto	Camila Gonzalez	18	1.76 m (5 ft 9 1/2 in)	Toronto
(Alberta) Spruce Grove	Jada Hong	22	1.70 m (5 ft 7 in)	Spruce Grove
(Alberta) Stony Plain	Brianne Kidner	23	1.73 m (5 ft 8 in)	Stony Plain
(Alberta) The Rockies	Medina Bandalli	23	1.68 m (5 ft 6 in)	Edmonton
(Ontario) Thorold	Jennifer Woiceshyn	23	1.72 m (5 ft 7 1/2 in)	Thorold
(Ontario) Thunder Bay	Sabrina Felice	27	1.72 m (5 ft 7 1/2 in)	Thunder Bay
(Alberta) Upper Canada	Alice Nyambi	18	1.78 m (5 ft 10 in)	Calgary
(British Columbia) Vancouver	Laura Guzman	23	1.68 m (5 ft 6 in)	Vancouver
(Alberta) West Calgary	Monika Horvat	26	1.78 m (5 ft 10 in)	Calgary
(Ontario) West Canada	Cailey Theos	22	1.68 m (5 ft 6 in)	Windsor
(Alberta) West Edmonton	Richa Kalra	24	1.68 m (5 ft 6 in)	Edmonton
West Ontario	Ninela Sanchez	21	1.70 m (5 ft 7 in)	Mississauga
(Ontario) West Toronto	Bianca Catracchia	20	1.73 m (5 ft 8 in)	Toronto
(Ontario) Whitby	Melissa Diakoumeas	24	1.75 m (5 ft 9 in)	Whitby
(Ontario) Windsor	Jelena Komlenac	20	1.65 m (5 ft 5 in)	Windsor
(Ontario) Woodbridge	Sasha Lombardi	20	1.73 m (5 ft 8 in)	Woodbridge
(Northwest Territories) Yellowknife	Elizabeth Valch	20	1.80 m (5 ft 11 in)	Yellowknife
Yukon Territory	Lisa Marie Halt	19	1.84 m (6 ft 1/2 in)	Whitehorse
