= Madison Kvaltin =

Canadian entrepreneur, model, and beauty pageant titleholder

- Born: 5 August 1998 (age 28); Greater Sudbury, Ontario, Canada
- Occupation: Model
- Height: 1.71 m (5 ft 7 1/2 in)
- Beauty pageant titleholder
- Title: Miss International Canada 2022; Miss Universe Canada 2023
- Major competitions: Miss Universe Canada 2022 (1st Runner-up); Miss International Canada 2022 (Winner); Miss International 2022 (Top 8); Miss Universe Canada 2023 (Winner); Miss Universe 2023 (Unplaced)

Madison Kvaltin (born 5 August 1998) is a Canadian entrepreneur, model and beauty pageant titleholder who was crowned Miss Universe Canada 2023.

Kvaltin competed in Miss International 2022 which was held in Japan where she finished as Top 8. On 18 November 2023, she represented Canada at Miss Universe 2023.

== Background ==
=== Early life ===
Kvaltin was born on 5 August 1998 in Greater Sudbury, Ontario, Canada. She holds a bachelor's degree in sociology and business, obtained from Queen's University in 2020. Besides her other works, she also owns Skilla Athletics, a beauty project that promotes body self-esteem in women and young girls.

In 2023, she alleged that had a job offer to work as a flight attendant for Emirates rescinded due to an eating disorder.

== Pageantry ==
=== Miss Northern Ontario 2016 ===
In 2016, Kvaltin won the title of Miss Northern Ontario 2016 in Sudbury where other 42 contestants took part in the competition. On July 24, 2016, she competed at the Queen Elizabeth Theatre in Vancouver, British Columbia, Canada and finished in the Top 20.

=== Miss Teenage Canada 2016 ===
In July 2016, Kvaltin took part in Miss Teenage Canada 2016 where she came number 20.

=== Miss Intercontinental Canada 2016 ===
In August 2016, she was a third winner against 36 other contestants.

=== Miss Intercontinental 2016 ===
In October 2016, she represented Canada at Miss Intercontinental 2016 where she competed against 59 other candidates in Colombo, Sri Lanka.

=== Miss World Canada 2021 ===
In October, 2021, Kvaltin competed against 39 other Miss World Canada 2021 candidates in Richmond Hill, Ontario where she got Top 15 placement.

=== Miss Universe Canada 2022 ===
In May 2022, she represented Sudbury at Miss Universe Canada 2022 where she competed against 53 other candidates in Toronto, Ontario. The outcome was being a runner-up to Amelia Tu.

=== Miss International 2022 ===
She finished in the Top 8 in December, 2022, where she represented Canada at Miss International 2022 . She competed against 65 other candidates in Tokyo, Japan.

=== Miss Universe Canada 2023 ===
She represented Manitoulin Island at Miss Universe Canada 2023 in August 2023 where she competed against 57 other candidates in Richmond, British Columbia, Canada and won the title. On November 18, 2023, she represented Canada at Miss Universe 2023 in San Salvador, El Salvador, where she was not placed in the Top 20.

Awards and achievements
Preceded by Megha Sandhu	Miss International Canada; 2022	Succeeded by Melanie Renaud
Preceded by Amelia Tu	Miss Universe Canada; 2023	Succeeded by Ashley Callingbull
