= The Price Is Right Tonight =

- Genre: Game show
- Based on: The Price Is Right
- Presented by: Howie Mandel
- Starring: Ashley Callingbull
- Announcer: Ben Shulman
- Country of origin: Canada
- Original language: English
- No. of seasons: 1
- No. of episodes: 12

Production
- Production locations: Canadian Broadcasting Centre, Toronto
- Camera setup: Multi-camera
- Running time: 60 minutes
- Production companies: Rogers Studios; Fremantle North America

Original release
- Network: Citytv
- Release: March 10, 2026 – present

Related
- The Price Is Right

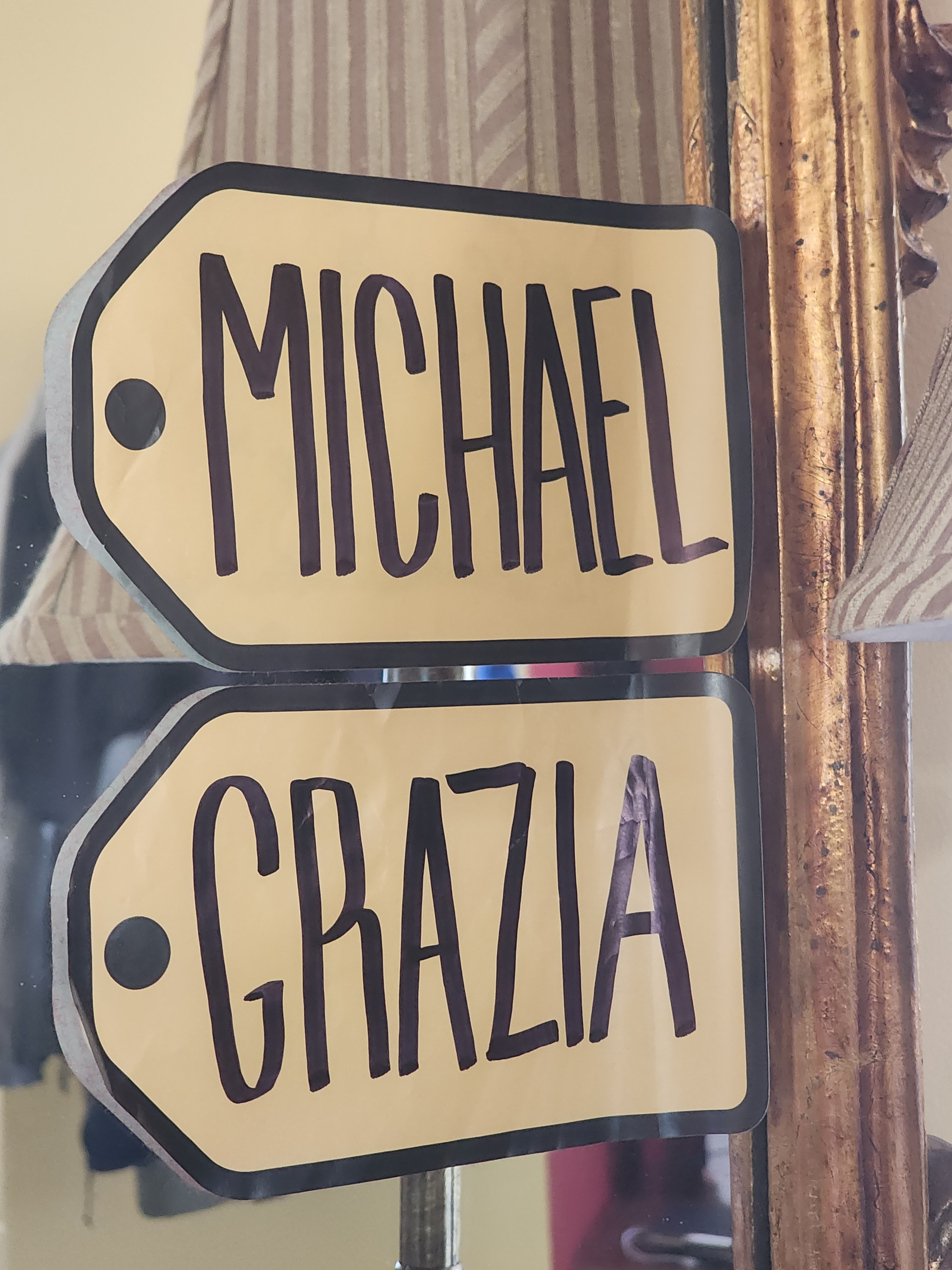
Name tags from The Price Is Right Tonight from a Season 2 recording.

The Price Is Right Tonight is a Canadian television game show and primetime spin-off of The Price Is Right. Premiering on March 10, 2026 on Citytv, the series is hosted by Howie Mandel and announced by Ben Shulman, with Ashley Callingbull as the show's lead model.

== Gameplay ==
The series follows a similar format to the original U.S. CBS version (having featured notable pricing games such as Cliff Hangers and Plinko among others), although with only four pricing games played per-episode and a single Showcase Showdown.

== History ==
The series was announced during Rogers Sports & Media's upfronts for the 2025–26 television season, serving as a replacement for Canada's Got Talent (which was concurrently placed on hiatus). Host Howie Mandel stated that the show would not simply be a Canadian adaptation of The Price is Right, but an "amped-up prime-time version". He explained that he would "bring himself" to the show as he did with Deal or No Deal, and that "I don't think you adapt things for Canada. If anything, some of the biggest comedians, biggest shows, biggest talent come out of Canada anyway." Prize model Ashley Callingbull stated that the show would also feature a larger focus on the contestants' stories and why they "want to win".

The Globe and Mail described its look and feel as "grander" and "more theatrical" than the CBS daytime version (which also airs on Citytv), while Rogers stated that at least 60% of its prizes would be supplied through Canadian companies. In acknowledgement of Callingbull's Cree heritage, the series has also highlighted products from Indigenous-owned companies as prizes. The series is produced in-house by Rogers Studios, which funded the production on its own without the use of tax credits.

In May 2026, Citytv renewed the series for a 24-episode second season to air as part of its fall lineup.
