= Joyce Jacobi =

Panamanian model

- Born: Joyce Fátima Marie Jacobi Samudio; 1988 (age 37–38); David, Chiriqui, Panama
- Height: 1.70 m (5 ft 7 in)
- Beauty pageant titleholder
- Title: Miss International Panamá 2009
- Hair color: Brunette
- Eye color: hazel
- Major competitions: Miss International Panamá 2009 (Winner), Miss International 2009 (Top 15), Reina Hispanoamericana 2009 (unplaced).

Joyce Fátima Marie Jacobi Samudio (born 1988, David, Chiriqui) is a Panamanian model and beauty pageant titleholder. She was elected Miss Panamá international 2009. This gave her the opportunity to compete in the Miss International 2009 pageant which was held in Chengdu, Sichuan, China where she was in the top 15.

== Pageant participations ==
In 2009, she participate in the contest Bellezas Panamá 2009 on Jun 17, 2009, won the title and was crowned by Alejandra Arias Miss International Panamá 2008.

Joyce also participated in the Reina Hispanoamericana 2009 Beauty Pageant that was held in Parque Urbano, in Santa Cruz, Bolivia on October 29, 2009. She was unplaced.

Jacobi represented Panamá in the Miss International 2009 in Chengdu, China finals that was held on November 28, 2009, at Sichuan International Tennis Center, Chengdu, Sichuan, China. She was among the top 15.

Awards and achievements
Preceded by Alejandra Arias	Miss International Panamá; 2009	Succeeded by Michelle Ostler
Preceded by Rosa Omaira Vargas	Reina Hispanoamericana Panamá; 2009	Succeeded by Michelle Ostler
