= Miss Universe Canada 2009 =

Beauty pageant

- Date: 2009
- Presenters: Dominique Dufour, Rick Campanelli
- Venue: John Bassett Theatre, Toronto, Ontario
- Entrants: 63
- Placements: 20
- Winner: Mariana Valente (Ontario) Richmond Hill

Miss Universe Canada 2009 was the 7th Miss Universe Canada pageant held at The Metro Toronto Convention Centre's John Bassett Theatre in Toronto, Ontario the pageant presented by Dominique Dufour, Miss Canada 1981, Miss Universe 1981 1st runner-up and Miss Universe Canada Organization representative and co-host Rick Campanelli. Mariana Valente, a 23-year-old of Richmond Hill, Ontario, was crowned Miss Universe Canada 2009. She was amongst 63 other contestants who competed for the title.

Valente represented Canada in the Miss Universe 2009 competition held on August 23, 2009 in Nassau, Bahamas where she did not place as a semifinalist.

== Results ==
Final results	Contestant	Results
Miss Universe Canada 2009	(Ontario) Richmond Hill - Mariana Valente	Unplaced
1st Runner-up	(British Columbia) Victoria - Ylenia Aurucci	
2nd Runner-up	(Ontario) South Toronto - Ksenia Mezenina	
3rd Runner-up	(Alberta) Upper Canada - Neda Derakhshan	
4th Runner-up	(Ontario) North Toronto - Isabelle Grastin	
Top 12	Calgary - Adwoa Yamoah; East Ontario - Brooke Boyle; Ontario Province - Chanel Beckenlehner; Calgary, Alberta - Kaley Johnson Miss Calgary 2009; Southeast Ontario - Jessica Goncalves (British Columbia) Southwest Canada - Cristina Helsenfeld; Quebec Province - Xiao Sun	
Top 20	Alberta Province - Paula Bailey; British Columbia Province - Sonya Durante; Burrard Peninsula - Natasha Petersen; East Toronto - Tara Mobayen; Ontario Province - Zoey McKenzie; Lower Quebec - Lee-Helene Gaulin Mosher; Manitoba Province - Ketevan Chigogidze; Montreal - Ting Jia Lorigiano (Newfoundland and Labrador) Newfoundland & Labrador Province - Lori O'Keefe	

=== Special awards ===
- Miss Elegance - Chanel Beckenlehner (Ontario Province)
- Miss Congeniality - Jessica Goncalvez (Southeast Ontario)
- Miss Photogenic - Tara Mobayen (East Toronto)
- Talent Award - Kaley Johnson (Calgary Alberta)

=== Top 5 ===
1. North Toronto
2. Upper Canada
3. Victoria
4. Richmond Hill
5. South Toronto

=== Top 12 ===
1. Calgary
2. Southeast Ontario
3. North Toronto
4. Calgary
5. Richmond Hill
6. South Toronto
7. Southwest Canada
8. Victoria
9. East Ontario
10. Quebec Province
11. Upper Canada
12. Ontario Province

=== Top 20 ===
1. Quebec Province
2. Newfoundland & Labrador Province
3. Richmond Hill
4. East Toronto
5. Ontario Province
6. Southeast Ontario
7. East Ontario
8. Alberta Province
9. Calgary
10. Manitoba Province
11. Scarborough
12. Montreal
13. South Toronto
14. Southwest Canada
15. Burrard Peninsula
16. Upper Canada
17. Victoria
18. British Columbia Province
19. North Toronto
20. Lower Quebec

== Contestants ==
There was 63 total contestants

Represented	Name	Age	Height	Hometown
Alberta Province	Paula Bailey	25	1.88 m (6 ft 2 in)	Edmonton
British Columbia Province	Sonya Durante	26	1.80 m (5 ft 11 in)	Vancouver
(British Columbia) Burnaby	Ravi Bansal	24	1.72 m (5 ft 8 in)	Burnaby
(British Columbia) Burrard Peninsula	Natasha Petersen	18	1.76 m (5 ft 9 in)	Vancouver
(Alberta) Calgary	Adwoa Yamoah	22	1.75 m (5 ft 9 in)	Calgary
(Ontario) Central Canada	Catharine Walsh	22	1.72 m (5 ft 8 in)	Ottawa
(Alberta) Cypress Hills	Marika Rabczak	26	1.67 m (5 ft 6 in)	Calgary
(Quebec) East Canada	Valerie Remillard	21	1.72 m (5 ft 8 in)	St. Félix de Valois
East Ontario	Brooke Boyle	19	1.81 m (5 ft 11 in)	LaSalle
East Quebec	Sarah Saei	22	1.75 m (5 ft 9 in)	Vaudreuil-Dorion
(Ontario) East Toronto	Tara Mobayen	21	1.69 m (5 ft 7 in)	Toronto
(Ontario) Etobicoke	Liz Martino	23	1.83 m (6 ft 0 in)	Etobicoke
(Quebec) Gatineau	Julie Gauthier	23	1.68 m (5 ft 6 in)	Gatineau
(Quebec) Hochelaga Archipelago	Marie-Eve Tremblay	21	1.75 m (5 ft 9 in)	Montreal
(Alberta) Klondike	Orlandice Balanag	21	1.71 m (5 ft 7 in)	Edmonton
(Quebec) Laval	Annie Aboukheir	23	1.73 m (5 ft 8 in)	Laval
Lower Alberta	Misty Drewes	23	1.75 m (5 ft 9 in)	Edmonton
(Quebec) Lower Canada	Melissa Porretta	25	1.71 m (5 ft 7 in)	Montreal
(British Columbia) Lower Mainland	Laura Pearlman	21	1.76 m (5 ft 9 in)	Vancouver
Lower Quebec	Lee-Helene Gaulin Mosher	20	1.71 m (5 ft 7 in)	Ayer's Cliff
Manitoba Province	Ketevan Chigogidze	26	1.72 m (5 ft 8 in)	Winnipeg
(British Columbia) Maple Ridge	Jeannette Pastuch	18	1.75 m (5 ft 9 in)	Maple Ridge
(Quebec) Montreal	Ting Jia Lorigiano	18	1.73 m (5 ft 8 in)	Montreal
(Ontario) National Capital Region	Danielle Anderson	22	1.73 m (5 ft 8 in)	Ottawa
(Quebec) New France	Izabela Daszkiewicz	26	1.70 m (5 ft 7 in)	Montreal
(Newfoundland and Labrador) Newfoundland & Labrador Province	Lori O'Keefe	26	1.68 m (5 ft 6 in)	Conception Bay
(Ontario) Niagara Falls	Sandra Kirilovic	21	1.75 m (5 ft 9 in)	Niagara Falls
(Alberta) North Canada	Ayler Macky	22	1.65 m (5 ft 5 in)	Calgary
North Ontario	Lisa Harrigan	22	1.68 m (5 ft 6 in)	Etobicoke
(Ontario) North Toronto	Isabelle Grastin	22	1.79 m (5 ft 10 in)	Toronto
(British Columbia) North Vancouver	Jenna Norwood	24	1.68 m (5 ft 6 in)	North Vancouver
Northeast Ontario	Celina Toenz	18	1.83 m (6 ft 0 in)	Bolton
Northwest Ontario	Tea-Nercita Savic	21	1.80 m (5 ft 11 in)	Belleville
Ontario Province	Chanel Beckenlehner	20	1.69 m (5 ft 7 in)	Caledon
Ontario Province	Zoey McKenzie	18	1.69 m (5 ft 7 in)	Brampton
(British Columbia) Pacific Coast	Jazmyne Dubec	18	1.75 m (5 ft 9 in)	New Westminster
(Alberta) Peace Country	Julianne Kos	19	1.75 m (5 ft 9 in)	Calgary
Quebec Province	Xiao Sun	22	1.72 m (5 ft 8 in)	Montreal
(Ontario) Richmond Hill	Mariana Valente	23	1.73 m (5 ft 8 in)	Richmond Hill
Calgary Alberta	Kaley Johnson	23	1.76 m (5 ft 9 in)	Calgary Alberta
South Alberta	Angela Valiant	22	1.75 m (5 ft 9 in)	Calgary
(Quebec) South Canada	Vincenza Jinny Conte	25	1.68 m (5 ft 6 in)	Montreal
South British Columbia	Rosalba Vagge	26	1.70 m (5 ft 7 in)	Vancouver
South Ontario	Stephanie Bulgaretti	20	1.70 m (5 ft 7 in)	Woodbridge
South Quebec	Mireille Gauthier	20	1.70 m (5 ft 7 in)	St. Foy
(Ontario) South Toronto	Ksenia Mezenina	19	1.73 m (5 ft 8 in)	Toronto
(Quebec) Southeast Canada	Livia Constantinescu	24	1.78 m (5 ft 10 in)	St. Lambert
Southeast Ontario	Jessica Goncalves	19	1.70 m (5 ft 7 in)	Leamington
(British Columbia) Southwest Canada	Cristina Helsenfeld	23	1.76 m (5 ft 9 in)	Prince George
Southwest Ontario	Madalina Bejgu	23	1.70 m (5 ft 7 in)	Newmarket
(British Columbia) Surrey	Rudia Jang	23	1.71 m (5 ft 7 in)	Surrey
(Alberta) The Prairies	Michelle McNaughton	23	1.70 m (5 ft 7 in)	Calgary
(Alberta) The Rockies	Alysha Clark	19	1.68 m (5 ft 6 in)	Sherwood Park
Upper Alberta	Sameet Gill	21	1.72 m (5 ft 8 in)	Edmonton
(Alberta) Upper Canada	Neda Derakhshan	25	1.72 m (5 ft 8 in)	Calgary
Upper Quebec	Melissa Francois	20	1.75 m (5 ft 9 in)	Montreal
(British Columbia) Vancouver	Tannaz Alesatar	24	1.78 m (5 ft 10 in)	Vancouver
(British Columbia) Victoria	Ylenia Aurucci	26	1.78 m (5 ft 10 in)	Victoria
West British Columbia	Stephanie Marinus	18	1.75 m (5 ft 9 in)	North Vancouver
(British Columbia) West Canada	Kimberly Wong	21	1.72 m (5 ft 8 in)	Burnaby
(British Columbia) West Coast	Christina Walls	25	1.72 m (5 ft 8 in)	Salt Spring Island
West Ontario	Rachelle Comeau	20	1.72 m (5 ft 8 in)	Kitchener
(Ontario) West Toronto	Yasmin Moavenian	24	1.70 m (5 ft 7 in)	Toronto
(Ontario) York	Kara-Jean Otuomagie	23	1.75 m (5 ft 9 in)	North York
