= Juliana Thiessen-Day =

Norwegian-Canadian beauty queen (born 1980)

- Born: Juliana Renée Thiessen; 1980 (age 45–46); Regina, Saskatchewan
- Spouse: Logan Day (1999–present)
- Beauty pageant titleholder
- Title: Miss Universe Canada 1998
- Major competitions: Miss Universe Canada 1998 (Winner); Miss Universe 1998

Juliana Renée Thiessen-Day (born 1980) is a Norwegian-Canadian beauty pageant titleholder. She is a former Miss Universe Canada contestant and the Canadian representative to the Miss Universe pageant in 1998.

== Personal life ==
=== Marriage ===
Thiessen-Day married Logan Day, son of former Canadian Alliance leader Stockwell Day, in 1999.

=== Focus of scandal ===
In 2000, Thiessen-Day was briefly the source of a minor scandal in Canada. During the CBC television coverage of the federal election, live footage of Thiessen Day at Alliance campaign headquarters was shown. An unidentified CBC producer, who was unaware his words were being broadcast live, made a comment about Thiessen Day's breasts. Since the producer's microphone was on, his comments were unwittingly broadcast to the entire province of British Columbia, until a quick-thinking technician cut the feed. Because the Canadian television networks were using a shared video and audio feed, his comments were broadcast on CTV and Global stations as well. The producer was forced to apologize.

Preceded by Carmen Kempt	Miss Universe Canada; 1998	Succeeded by Shannon McArthur
