= Nuestra Belleza Nuevo León 2007 =

- Date: July 25, 2007
- Presenters: Silvia Salgado; Cecilia Gutiérrez; Patricio Cabezut
- Entertainment: Lidia Ávila • Reik
- Venue: Las Lomas Eventos, Monterrey, Nuevo León
- Broadcaster: Televisa
- Entrants: 8
- Placements: 3
- Winner: Anagabriela Espinoza

Nuestra Belleza Nuevo León 2007, was held at Las Lomas Eventos in Monterrey, Nuevo León on July 25, 2007. At the conclusion of the final night of competition, Anagabriela Espinoza of San Pedro Garza García was crowned the winner. Espinoza was crowned by outgoing Nuestra Belleza Nuevo León titleholder, Mariana Lombard.

The pageant was hosted by Nuestra Belleza Nuevo León 1998 Silvia Salgado, Cecilia Gutiérrez & Patricio Cabezut.

== Results ==
=== Placements ===
Final results	Contestant
Nuestra Belleza Nuevo León 2007	San Pedro – Anagabriela Espinoza
1st Runner-up	Guadalupe – Fabiola Guajardo
2nd Runner-up	Guadalupe – Gloria Elisa Ortega

== Judges ==
- Priscila Perales – Nuestra Belleza México 2005 & Miss International 2007
- Arturo Carmona – Actor
- Susana Valdez – Journalist
- Jesús Tovar – Photographer

== Contestants ==
Hometown	Contestant	Age	Height (m)
Guadalupe	Carmen Elisa Garza	21	1.77
Guadalupe	Fabiola Guajardo	20	1.69
Guadalupe	Gloria Elisa Ortega	21	1.75
Monterrey	Claudia Lorena Rodríguez	21	1.68
Monterrey	Gabriela Teresa Acosta	20	1.68
San Nicolás	Dana Sarahí Tinajero	21	1.68
San Pedro	Anagabriela Espinoza	19	1.80
Santiago	Saida Salazar	23	1.72
