= Elena Semikina =

Russian-Canadian actress

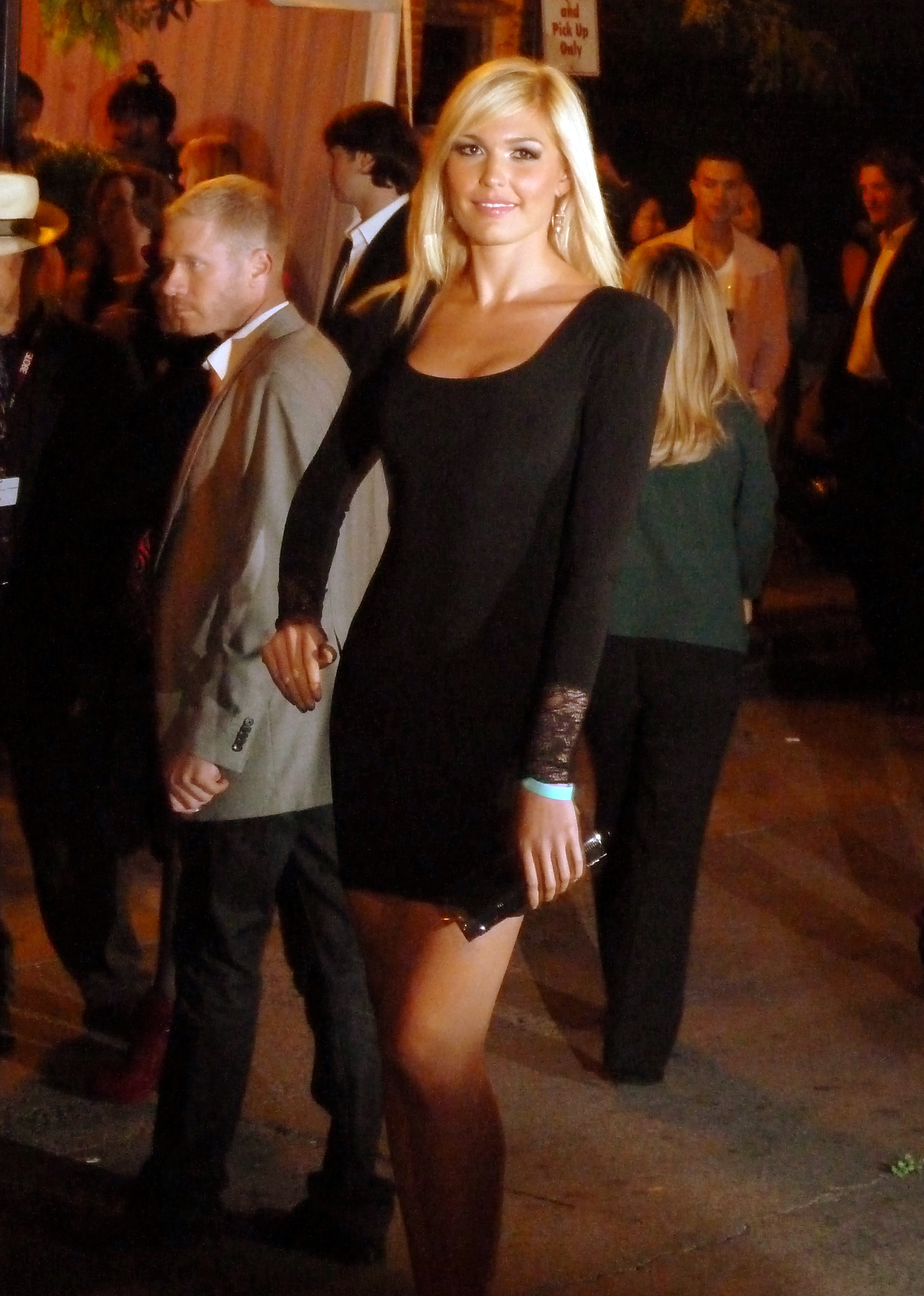
- Born: Elena Semikina; September 8, 1983 (age 43); Chișinău, Moldova, Soviet Union
- Height: 6 ft (1.8 m)
- Beauty pageant titleholder
- Title: Miss Universe Canada 2010
- Major competitions: Miss International 2008 (Unplaced); Miss Universe Canada 2010 (Winner), Miss Universe 2010 (Unplaced)

Elena Semikina (born September 8, 1983) is a Moldovan Canadian actress, model, producer and beauty pageant titleholder. Semikina was crowned Miss Universe Canada 2010 in Toronto, Ontario, on June 14, 2010. She represented Canada at the Miss Universe 2010 beauty pageant held in Las Vegas, Nevada, U.S. on August 23, 2010. Semikina conceived and executive-produced the feature documentary film Our Man in Tehran about the Iran Hostage Crisis. It premiered at the 2013 Toronto International Film Festival a year after Ben Affleck's feature film, Argo, a scripted drama about the same events, premiered at the same festival.

In January 2020 Canadian authorities charged Semikina with criminally harassing her ex-boyfriend Drew Taylor and his wife Jennifer over a period of five years. Semikina allegedly threatened both of them with bodily harm, threatened to raise false allegations against Taylor unless he advanced her film career, and also threatened to kill him. The case is on-going.

On March 24, 2025, Semikina was again arrested and charged with one count of criminal harassment and two counts of threatening death and bodily harm towards Drew Taylor and his wife, Jennifer. The case is on-going. Neither allegations nor those of her accuser have been heard in court.

Preceded by Samantha Tajik	Miss Universe Canada; 2010	Succeeded by Chelsae Durocher
