= Neelam Verma =

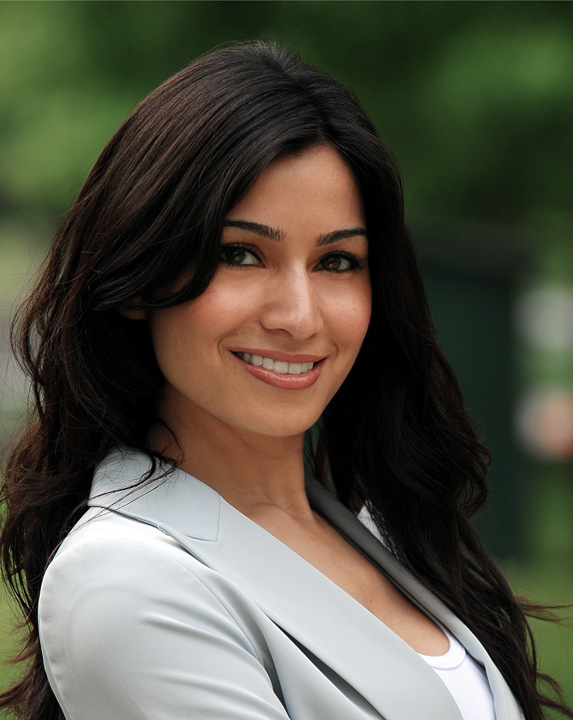
- Born: Montreal, Quebec, Canada
- Occupations: Entrepreneur, TV host
- Beauty pageant titleholder
- Title: Miss Canada 2002
- Major competitions: Miss Canada 2002 (Winner); Miss Universe 2002 (Top-10 finalist)
- Website: www.integritydating.com

Neelam Verma is a Canadian TV host, advocate and beauty pageant titleholder who was crowned Miss Canada 2002 and represented her country at Miss Universe 2002 where she placed Top 10 in Puerto Rico.

== Biography ==
Verma is the founder of Integrity Dating. She is an international speaker, TV presenter, and former Miss Canada and Miss Universe finalist. She has been featured in the media and as a speaker and expert on Mindvalley. Verma teaches courses and has events to help people be more intentional in dating. Neelam worked as a TV presenter for media networks including CNN, ESPN, Discovery Channel, Rogers Media, TRT World, and Quebecor. She won the Miss Canada title and was a finalist at the Miss Universe pageant, the first woman of Indian origin to represent the country. She graduated from York University's Schulich School of Business, and worked for Procter and Gamble and Fortune 500 companies before working in media.

== Career ==
=== Entrepreneur ===
Verma is an entrepreneur and founder of Integrity Dating. She launched her company in 2020 to create a global movement in conscious dating. She teaches online courses and has global events that help people create meaningful relationships. She is an international Speaker and Conscious Dating Pioneer.

=== Television ===
Verma worked as a broadcast journalist and TV host for morning shows, news, entertainment and lifestyle shows in Canada, USA, India and the Middle East. She has interviewed celebrities, CEOs, New York Times authors, athletes and spiritual leaders. She trained with CNN International.

She has worked with TRT World in Istanbul as a presenter, ESPN as a host for "Premier Futsal" in India, on Discover Channel as a host on "Daily Planet", on Sun News Network as a morning show host on "First Look With Neelam Verma", and with Rogers Media in Canada as an entertainment anchor for Bollywood Boulevard. She has also been a speaker and presenter for the United Nations, Miss Canada Pageant, Mindvalley, and the IFFA Awards.

=== Miss Universe ===
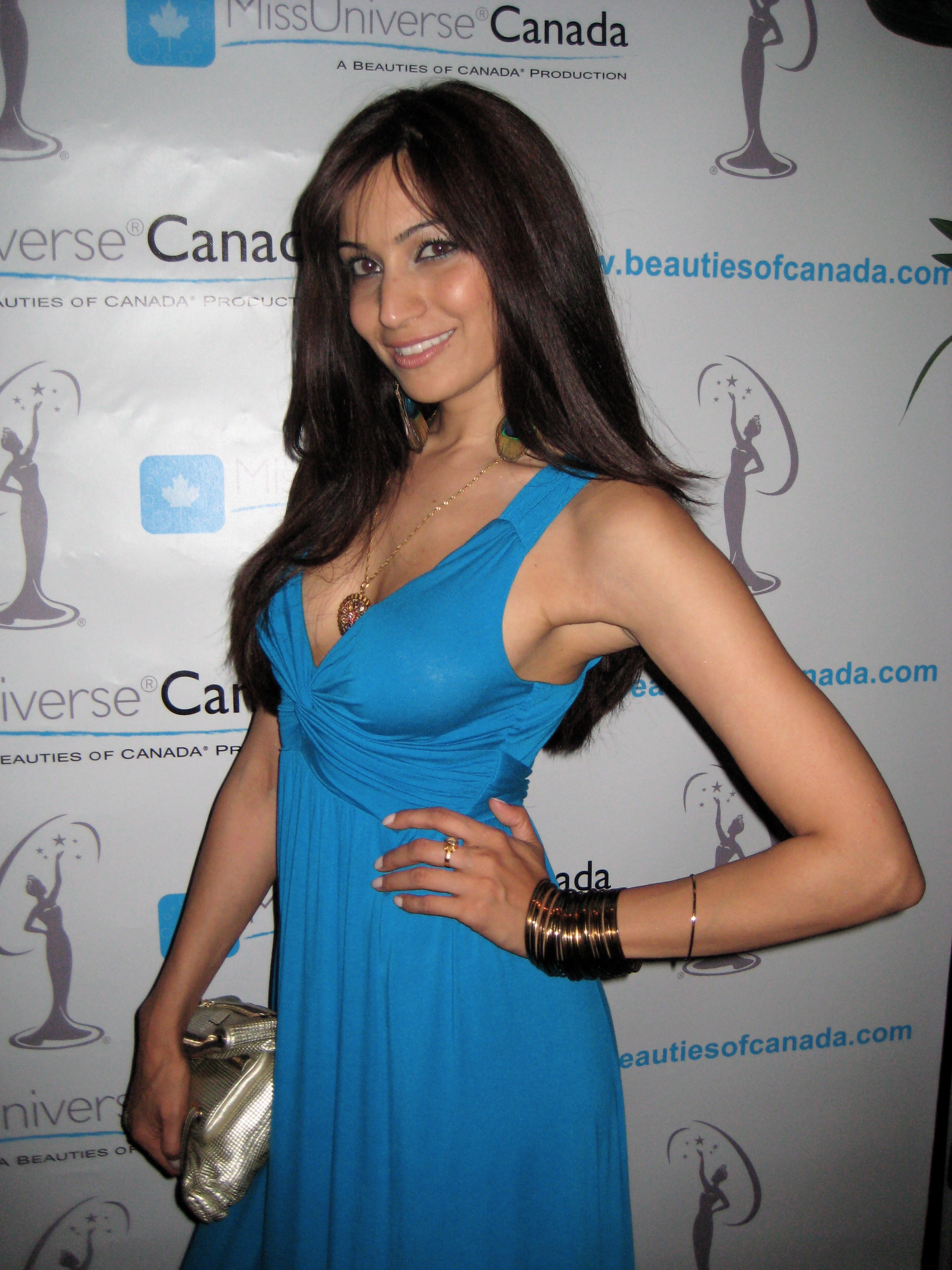
Neelam Verma at Beauties for a Cause Charity Event, Toronto.

Verma won the Miss Universe Canada competition in 2002, becoming the first woman of Indian heritage to win the title. She represented Canada at the Miss Universe pageant in San Juan, Puerto Rico, and was in the top 10 as a finalist. She hosted the Miss Universe Canada Pageant and was on the judging panel.

| Preceded by Cristina Rémond | Miss Universe Canada; 2002 | Succeeded by Leanne Marie Cecile |
