= The Great Salish Heist =

- Directed by: Darrell Dennis
- Screenplay by: Darrell Dennis; Harold C. Joe; Sophie Underwood
- Produced by: Harold C. Joe; Leslie D. Bland
- Starring: Darrell Dennis; Ashley Callingbull; Graham Greene
- Cinematography: Joseph Boutilier
- Edited by: Dan Krieger
- Music by: Alexander Brendan Ferguson
- Production company: Orca Cove Media
- Release date: February 9, 2024 (VFF)
- Running time: 95 minutes
- Country: Canada
- Language: English

The Great Salish Heist is a 2024 Canadian comedy heist film, directed by Darrell Dennis. The film stars Dennis as Steve Joe, an Indigenous Canadian archaeologist who embarks on a quest to steal back indigenous artifacts from a museum and repatriate them back to their rightful owners.

The cast also includes Ashley Callingbull, Leslie D. Bland, Judah Burns, Danica Charlie, Katya Gardner, Graham Greene, Tricia Helfer, Trevor Hinton, Harold Joe, Taylor Kinequon, Craig Lauzon, Wayne Lavallee, Tchadas Leo, David James Lewis, Sam Lowry and Andrea Menard in supporting roles.

The film was shot in fall 2022 on Vancouver Island.

The film premiered on February 9, 2024, at the Victoria Film Festival. It subsequently had various theatrical and film festival screenings in other Vancouver Island communities, and at the VIFF Centre, as well as selected screenings across Canada on National Indigenous Peoples Day in June.
