= Maria Al-Masani =

Yemeni-Canadian fashion designer

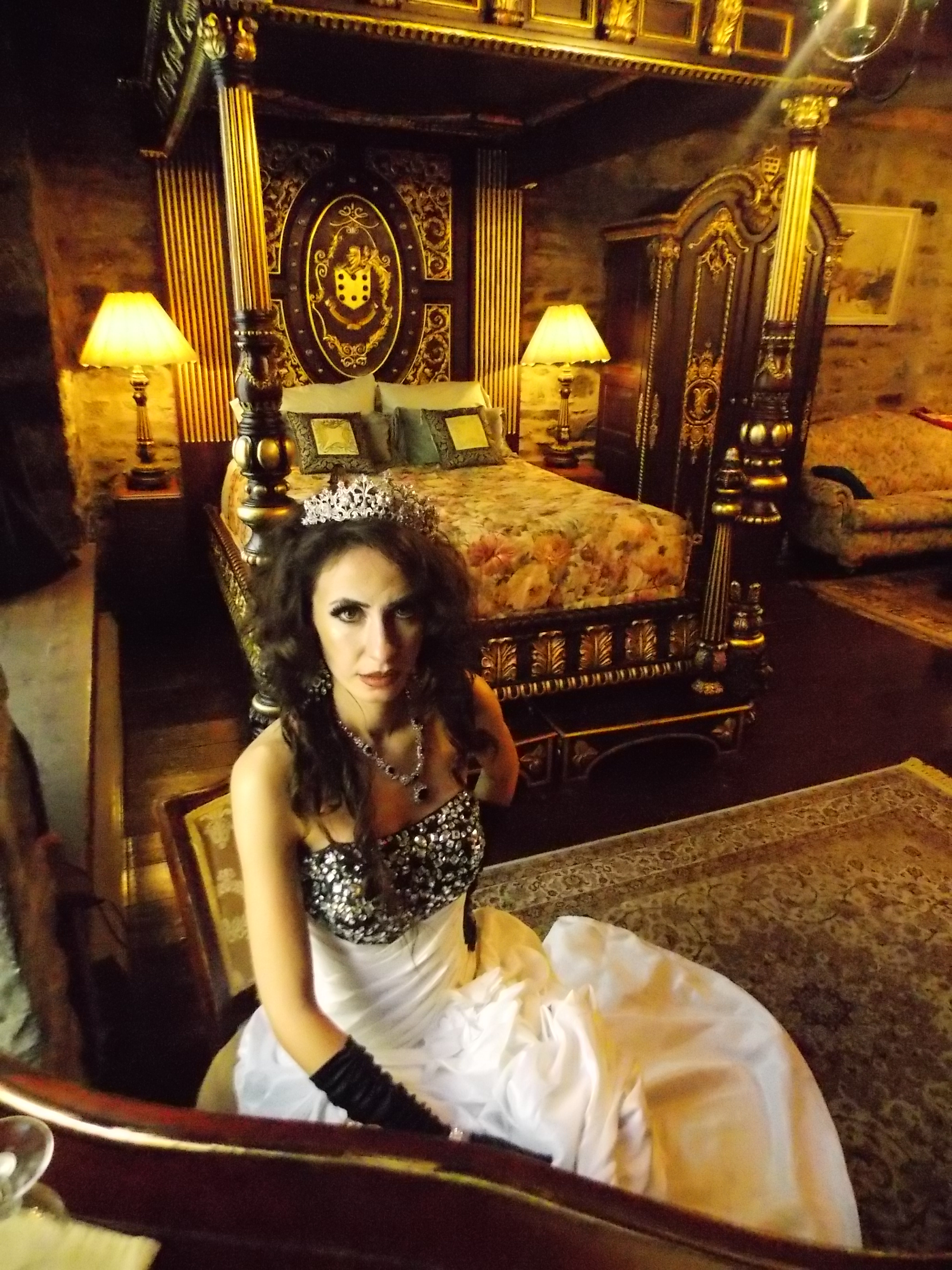

Maria Al-Masani (born 1984) is a Yemeni and Canadian fashion designer and public relations executive who co-founded the Yemen Rights Monitor, a blog to record human rights violations. In 2012, she was named as one of eight 'agents of change' by CNN's Inside the Middle East.

== Early life and career ==
Maria Al-Masani was born in Russia and moved to Yemen at age three. At 16, she moved to Erie, Pennsylvania, attending a local college before relocating to Ottawa to study economic development at Carleton University.

Al-Masani came to national and international attention as the first contestant of Yemeni origin to enter the Miss Universe pageant at the national level for Miss Universe Canada, and the first Yemeni contestant to win a title, of Miss Congeniality at the competition in 2010. She also worked for two political parties in the Parliament of Canada, Liberal Party, and an NDP staffer before she was married in 2015, when she retired as a housewife and switched her career to study fashion, become a designer and image consultant.

== Activism ==
Al-Masani founded Yemen Rights Monitor during the Arab Spring in 2011, providing a means of updating news via social media when traditional news media had been blocked – she was later cited by Andy Carvin as one of his most reliable sources about opposition activities in Yemen.

She has appeared as an activist against forced marriage on Al Jazeera's The Stream, recounting her friends escape from a potential forced marriage in Yemen. In 2012, Al-Masani was among the speakers at a summit hosted by Yahoo! in Cairo on women's use of technology to create positive change. In 2011, she spoke at the Silicon Valley Human Rights Conference, discussing how social media has been used to circumvent censorship in Yemen.

Maria Al-Masani supports free speech as the foundation of western civilization, modern civil society and decries censorship inspired by her late uncle Dr Abdulaziz Al Saqqaf. Dr Al-Saqqaf was the winner of the N.P.C.'s International Award for Freedom of the Press for 1995.

Al-Masani serves on the board of Madbakh Women's International, a group whose projects have included raising funds for the National Boroma Fistula Hospital in Somalia. She also discussed fistula on Al Jazeera's The Stream and in a feature in the Canadian political and government newspaper The Hill Times.

== Opera ==
Maria Al-Masani is a supporter of traditional classical music and organized Evening of Beauty along with Pellegrini Opera to fund-raise for the Evening of Beauty.

== Happy Yemens and Haute Couture ==
Since Sept 24, 2014, during Yemeni civil war, Al-Masani started a collective Happy Yemens www.happyyemens.org to raise awareness for her besieged town of Taiz, besieged by Houthis. The expose of corruption had caused an outrage amongst many pro Houthi radical Islamist Twitter platform users, especially her post on UN corruption in collaboration with Houthi militias in Yemen. As her uncle Dr. Abdulaziz Alsaqqaf, founder of Yemen Times, was assassinated for his endeavors for a free press in Yemen, Al-Masani supports journalist ethics and truth in media, asking journalists to fact check, for example in for GamerGate. Since 2015, she has been studying classic haute couture at the Richard Robinson Academy, a school found by Richard Robinson who worked under Christian Dior himself. Her previous blog Ottawa Royal Style, popular among elegant discerning women www.ottawaroyalstyle.com focuses on a classic chic elegance, with an emphasis on aesthetics that will bring joy to the wearer while helping the wearer achieve their goals, and help the client achieve her personal and professional goals. Her influences are vintage Dior, Jacques Fath and vintage Givency, Richard Robinson, Elie Saab and Zuhair Murad.

She currently an image consultant and a fashion designer, starting her own brand, Al-Masani Royal House, based on ideals of promoting elegance and beauty to help women achieve their goals and improve their self esteem. During Covid she could no longer make Arab bridal designs nor sell her famed handmade ties at Vernini, and switched to image and colour consulting for the pandemic. She is currently a certified image, etiquette and colour consultant that helps women achieve their dreams through changing their wardobe, stoicism, relationship coaching and mindset, promoting this through her popular Youtube Channel with over 300,000 subscribers, Maria Al Masani Royal House - YouTube. One of her Tiktoks on etiquette questions had over 39,000 views She has returned to sewing and designing ties, but her focus remains on image consultation and youtube. Many of her clients achieved their goals by getting some polish, married the man of their dreams, got raises, and got the job while improving their wardobe, mindset, relational/social skills, and presentation.

== External sources ==
- Yemen Rights Monitor
- [www.tvrogers.com/media?lid=237&rid=4&gid=284995/ Rogers Television ]
- CNN Inside the Middle East Women and the Arab uprisings: 8 'agents of change' to follow by Laura Bohn
- Change Your World Cairo 2012 Women's Summit (PDF)
- Silicon Valley Human Rights Conference report (PDF)
