= Cristina Rémond =

Canadian public servant

Cristina Yvonne Rémond (born 1980) is a Canadian model and beauty pageant titleholder who was crowned Miss Canadian Universe 2001 and Canada's representative at the Miss Universe 2001 pageant.

She grew up in Montreal, Quebec and attended The Study in Westmount, Quebec, where she graduated in 1998. She first participated in a beauty pageant in 1999 at the second Global Beauty Quest, based in Montreal. She represented Hungary and won. She graduated from John Abbott College in 2001. She subsequently attended Carleton University studying for a degree in Human Rights and Anthropology. She later attended Harvard Divinity School.

Rémond has a pilots license, and worked as an instructor for the Royal Canadian Air Cadets.

In 2001, she represented Canada at the Miss Universe 2001 pageant in Puerto Rico but did not place.

Preceded by Kim Yee	Miss Universe Canada; 2001	Succeeded by Neelam Verma
