= Alice Panikian =

Bulgarian-born Canadian model

- Born: Alice Panikian; Sofia, Bulgaria
- Height: 1.85 m (6 ft 1 in)
- Beauty pageant titleholder
- Title: Miss Universe Canada 2006; Reinado Internacional del Café 2006
- Hair colour: Brown
- Eye colour: Brown
- Major competitions: Miss Universe Canada 2006 (Winner); Miss Universe 2006 (Top 10); Reinado Internacional del Café 2006 (Winner)
- Website: www.alicepanikian.com

Alice Panikian (Armenian: Ալիսա Փանիկյան; Bulgarian: Алис Паникян is a Bulgarian-Canadian journalist, TV host, model and beauty pageant titleholder who was crowned Miss Universe Canada 2006 and Miss Reinado Internacional del Cafe 2006. She attended William Lyon Mackenzie Collegiate Institute in Toronto.

Alice had earned significant media attention as a strong candidate likely to succeed to then-reigning Miss Universe, Natalie Glebova, also from Canada. As no country has ever won the title back-to-back (later achieved by Dayana Mendoza and Stefanía Fernández in 2009, both of them from Venezuela), Panikian had a significant historical hurdle to cross despite some pundits arguing that she was perhaps an even stronger candidate than her predecessor. Panikian did not become Miss Universe 2006 (that honour went to Zuleyka Rivera of Puerto Rico), but she did finish in sixth place. She is the last Canadian representative to place at the Miss Universe until 2016.

Panikian is of Bulgarian and Armenian ancestry, which comes through her paternal grandfather and accounts for her Armenian surname. She came to Canada with her parents when she was five years old. Panikian studied at York University and majored in English and Communications. She studied broadcast journalism, resides in New York City.

Before becoming Miss Universe Canada, Panikian represented Canada at the 2006 Reinado Internacional del Café or International Queen of Coffee pageant, held in Manizales, Colombia on January 9, where she became the first Canadian winner in the history of the pageant.

She also took the "Miss Photogenic" and "Best in Swimsuit" awards at the Miss Universe Canada Pageant.

Panikian was supposed to represent Canada and compete at Miss International 2007 held in Tokyo, Japan, but due to schedule conflicts in university, she did not compete. Justine Stewart took her place.

Preceded by Natalie Glebova	Miss Universe Canada; 2006	Succeeded by Inga Skaya
Preceded by Emily Kiss	Miss International Canada; 2007	Succeeded by Did not compete
