= Miss Universe Canada =

National beauty pageant competition in Canada

- Formation: 2002; 24 years ago
- Headquarters: Toronto
- Location: Canada
- Official language: English
- National Director: Sonny Borrelli
- Affiliations: Miss Universe
- Website: missuniversecanada.ca

Miss Universe Canada is an annual national beauty pageant that selects Canada's official representative to Miss Universe, one of the Big Four beauty pageants

The Beauties of Canada Organization gained the exclusive rights to send a Canadian representative to the Miss Universe Pageant in 2002. The company President is Denis Dávila.

== Background ==
The first Miss Universe Canada was held in 2003, and won by Leanne Marie Cecile. Cecile reached the top 10 at Miss Universe 2003.

Natalie Glebova won in 2005 and went on to become Miss Universe 2005. Glebova's successor Alice Panikian reached the top 10 of Miss Universe 2006.

As of 2022, Canada (and France) are the only countries to send a delegate to every contest since the first Miss Universe 1952.

== International winners ==
- Natalie Glebova won (Miss Universe 2005)
- Alice Panikian won Reinado Internacional del Café 2006
- Amber Bernachi won Miss Eco International 2017

== Controversy ==
In 2010, the contest made headlines when Maria Al-Masani, the first contestant of Yemeni origin, competed. This was controversial as her religious beliefs were accommodated by allowing her to wear a semi-transparent sarong over her swimsuit. In 2012, CNN World News named her one of its eight agents of change to follow, the only Canadian to receive that designation.

The 2012 contest was accused of transphobia after disqualifying a transgender contestant, Jenna Talackova, for not being a "naturally born female". A spokesperson released a statement saying she was disqualified because on her entry form she stated she was born a female, which was not the case. Eventually, Talackova was allowed to return.

Sahar Biniaz left the contest a few days prior to it starting. She was replaced by first runner-up Adwoa Yamoah, and she competed in Miss Universe 2012.

On 27 May 2013, two days after the pageant, it was announced that Denise Garrido had won. Due to a mathematical error, third runner-up Garrido was named the winner. A typo was discovered in the top five scoring results, which changed the final result, with Riza Santos declared the winner.

Due to the pandemic, the 2021 contest was cancelled and the titles Miss Universe Canada 2021 and Miss International Canada 2021 were appointed to the delegates next in line. The Miss Universe Canada 2020 first runner-up Tamara Jemuovic was awarded the title of Miss Universe Canada 2021 and competed in Eilat, Israel at the 70th Miss Universe pageant. The Miss Universe Canada 2020 second runner-up Jaime VandenBerg, was awarded the title of Miss International Canada 2021, although the 2020 and 2021 Miss International pageants were cancelled.

In 2026, two contestants, Karisa Haverkamp and Jasleen Kaily, wore Indigenous costumes during National Costume round. This was referred to as cultural appropriation, and National Director Sonny Borrelli made an apology.

== Titleholders ==
=== Miss Universe Canada ===
- : Declared as Winner
- : Ended as runner-up or top 5/6 qualification
- : Ended as one of the finalists or semifinalists
- : Ended as special awards winner

Year	Hometown	Miss Universe Canada	Age (Note: Ages at the time of Miss Universe)	Placement at Miss Universe	Special Award(s)
2026	Ancaster	Aslihan Morali	28	TBA	
2025	Lethbridge	Jaime VandenBerg	28	Top 30	
2024	Enoch	Ashley Callingbull	34	Top 12	
2023	Manitoulin Island	Madison Kvaltin	25	Unplaced	
2022	Vancouver	Amelia Tu	20	Top 16	
2021	Toronto	Tamara Jemuovic	27	Unplaced	
2020	Vancouver	Nova Stevens	28	Unplaced	
2019	Tecumseh	Alyssa Boston	24	Unplaced	
2018	Windsor	Marta Stępień	24	Top 10	
2017	Toronto	Lauren Howe	24	Top 10	Best National Costume (Top 12)
2016	Moose Jaw	Siera Bearchell	23	Top 9	
2015	Toronto	Paola Núñez Valdez	24	Unplaced	
2014	Caledon	Chanel Beckenlehner	25	Unplaced	Best National Costume (Top 5)
2013	Calgary	Riza Santos	26	Unplaced	
2012	Vancouver	Sahar Biniaz (Note: Sahar Biniaz did not compete at Miss Universe 2012 due to a foot injury.)	26	Did not compete	
2012	Calgary	Adwoa Yamoah	26	Unplaced	
2011	Tecumseh	Chelsae Durocher	20	Unplaced	
2010	Toronto	Elena Semikina	26	Unplaced	
2009	Richmond Hill	Mariana Valente	23	Unplaced	
2008	Richmond Hill	Samantha Tajik	26	Unplaced	
2007	Toronto	Inga Skaya	21	Unplaced	
2006	Toronto	Alice Panikian	20	Top 10	
2005	Toronto	Natalie Glebova	23	Miss Universe 2005	
2004	Waterdown	Venessa Fisher	18	Unplaced	
2003	Tecumseh	Leanne Marie Cecile	25	Top 10	

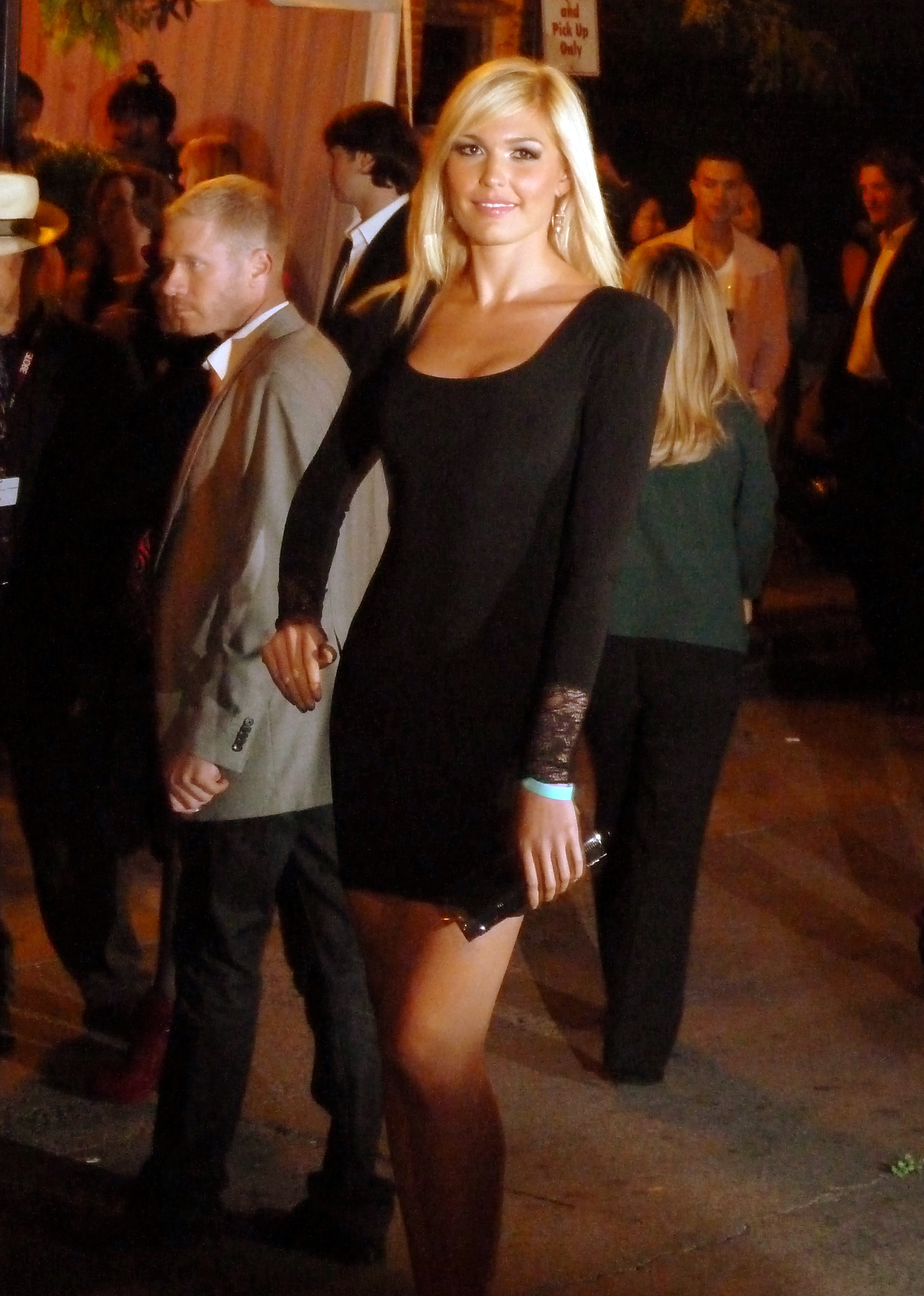
Elena Semikina - Miss Universe Canada 2010

== Miss Canada 1952—2002 ==
- : Declared as Winner
- : Ended as runner-up or top 5/6 qualification
- : Ended as one of the finalists or semifinalists
- : Ended as special awards winner

=== 1993–2002 ===
The Canadian Search Miss Universe or Miss Canadian Universe was hosted by Chan International Models of Edmonton until 2002. While the 2002 event was held in August 2001 in Toronto, all previous events from 1993 to 2001 were held in Edmonton.

Year	Represented	Miss Canada	Age	Placement at Miss Universe	Special Awards
2002	Etobicoke	Neelam Verma	25	Top 10	
2001	Montreal, Quebec	Cristina Rémond	21	Unplaced	
2000	Edmonton	Kim Yee	23	Top 5	
1999	Western Ontario	Shannon McArthur	26	Unplaced	
1998	Calgary, Alberta	Juliana Thiessen	18	Unplaced	
1997	Red Deer, Alberta	Carmen Kempt	18	Unplaced	
1996	Vancouver, British Columbia	Renette Cruz	25	Unplaced	
1995	Calgary, Alberta	Lana Buchberger	20	2nd Runner-up	
1994	Dawson Creek, British Columbia	Susanne Rothfos	18	Unplaced	
1993	Calgary, Alberta	Nancy Ann Elder	21	Unplaced	

=== 1979—1992 ===
The Miss Canada pageant obtained the franchise for the Miss Universe Pageant in 1978, when that year's first runner-up, Andrea Leslie Eng, competed internationally. From 1979 to the final contest, the winners of Miss Canada went on to compete. Miss Canada 1982, Karen Baldwin, being the only Miss Canada to also win Miss Universe. The show was popular in the 1970s, with up to 5 million viewers, but declined in the 1980s, until the franchise holders, Cleo Productions, closed in early 1992. Producers of the show cited mounting production costs, as the reason for cancellation. The last winner was Miss Canada 1992, Nicole Dunsdon, from Summerland, British Columbia, a speech pathology student at the University of Alberta.

Year	Represented	Miss Canada	Placement at Miss Universe	Special Awards
1992	Interior of British Columbia	Nicole Dunsdon	Unplaced	
1991	Edmonton, Alberta	Leslie McLaren	Unplaced	
1990	Niagara Region, Ontario	Robin Lee Ouzunoff	Unplaced	
1989	Laurentians Region, Quebec	Juliette Powell	Unplaced	
1988	London, Ontario	Mary-Melinda Gillies	Unplaced	
1987	Niagara Region, Ontario	TinaMay Simpson	Unplaced	
1986	Interior of British Columbia	Rene Newhouse	Unplaced	
1985	Calgary, Alberta	Karen Elizabeth Tilley	Top 10	
1984	Edmonton, Alberta	Cynthia Michele Kereluk	Unplaced	
1983	Manitoba	Jodi Yvonne Rutledge	Unplaced	
1982	London, Ontario	Karen Dianne Baldwin	Miss Universe 1982	
1981	Laval, Québec	Dominique Dufour	1st Runner-up	
1980	Calgary, Alberta	Teresa "Terry" Lynn Mackay	Top 12	
1979	Manitoba	Heidi Quiring	Unplaced	
1978	Vancouver, British Columbia	Andrea Leslie Eng	Unplaced	

=== 1959—1977 ===
Between 1969 and 1977 the Miss Dominion of Canada pageant originated when the Bruno family of Ancaster, Ontario obtained franchise rights to select and send Canada's exclusive representatives to Miss Universe. The winner of Miss Dominion of Canada competed in Miss Universe, Miss World, and often both Miss International and Queen of the Pacific. The Miss Universe franchise in Canada was taken over by the nationally televised Miss Canada contest in 1978.

Year	Represented	Miss Canada	Placement at Miss Universe	Special Awards
1977	British Columbia	Pamela Mercer	Unplaced	Miss Congeniality
1976	Ontario	Normande Jacques	Unplaced	
1975	Ontario	Sandra Margaret Emily Campbell	Unplaced	
1974	Ontario	Deborah Tone	Unplaced	
1973	Ontario	Deborah Anne Ducharme	Unplaced	
1972	Ontario	Bonny Brady	Unplaced	
1971	Ontario	Lana Drouillard	Unplaced	
1970	Prince Edward Island	Norma Joyce Hickey	Unplaced	
1969	Ontario	Jacquie May Perrin	Unplaced	
1968	Ontario	Nancy Wilson	Top 15	
1967	Ontario	Donna Marie Barker	Unplaced	
1966	Ontario	Marjorie Anne Schofield	Unplaced	
1965	Ontario	Carol Ann Tidey	Top 15	
1964	Newfoundland	Mary Lou Farrell	Unplaced	
1963	Saskatchewan	Jane Kmita	Unplaced	
1962	Ontario	Marilyn McFatridge	Top 15	
1961	Ontario	Wilda Reynolds	Unplaced	
1960	Ontario	Edna Dianne MacVicar	Unplaced	
1959	Ontario	Eileen Butter	Unplaced	

=== 1952—1958 ===
In 1952, Miss Toronto 1951 competed to Miss Universe 1952. Between 1952 and 1958 Miss Universe Canada was selected by a photo contest and/or casting by Silknit Ltd. of Toronto, Canada. Most winners were former Miss Toronto Pageant winners or participants.

Year	Represented	Miss Canada	Placement at Miss Universe	Special Awards
1958	Toronto, Ontario	Eileen Cindy Conroy	Unplaced	
1957	Toronto, Ontario	Gloria Noakes	Top 15	Miss Popular (based on votes from the pre-pageant parade in Long Beach)
1956	Toronto, Ontario	Elaine Evelyn Bishenden	Unplaced	
1955	Toronto, Ontario	Cathy Diggles	Top 15	
1954	Toronto, Ontario	Joyce Mary Landry	Unplaced	
1953	Toronto, Ontario	Thelma Elizabeth Brewis	Top 16	
1952	Toronto, Ontario	Ruth Carrier	Unplaced	

== Previous international pageants ==
=== Miss International Canada ===
- : Declared as Winner
- : Ended as runner-up or top 5/6 qualification
- : Ended as one of the finalists or semifinalists
- : Ended as special awards winner

The following is a list of all Miss International Canada titleholders under Beauties of Canada or Miss Universe Canada from 2003 to 2024.

Year	Hometown	Miss International Canada	Placement at Miss International	Special Award(s)	Notes
2024	Langley, British Columbia	Jessica Bailey	Unplaced		List: Previously won Miss Supranational Canada 2022.; Unplaced at Miss Supranational 2022, won Miss Congeniality Award.; 1st Runner-up at Both Miss Universe Canada 2023 and Miss International Canada 2023.; Unplaced at Miss Universe Canada 2017
2023	Windsor, Ontario	Melanie Renaud	Unplaced		List: Later became first ever Miss Charm Canada 2024 .; Unplaced at Miss Charm 2024; 2nd Runner-up at Miss Universe Canada 2023.(won Queenly Spokesmodel and Miss Photogenic titles); Previously Miss Galaxy Canada 2022; Previously Top 7 at Miss Earth Canada 2020; Winner Canada's Perfect Super Model 2015; Top 10 at Miss Teenage Canada 2013
2022	Toronto, Ontario	Madison Kvaltin	Top 8		List: * Later won Miss Universe Canada 2024.; Unplaced at Miss Universe 2024; 1st Runner-up at Miss Universe Canada 2022; Top 15 at Miss World Canada 2021; Previously won Miss Intercontinental Canada 2016.; Unplaced at Miss Intercontinental 2016); Top 20 at Miss Teenage Canada 2016
2021	Toronto	Jaime VandenBerg	Both contestants were chosen, but the International pageant was cancelled due to the COVID-19 pandemic.		
2020	Toronto	Tamara Jemuovic	Both contestants were chosen, but the International pageant was cancelled due to the COVID-19 pandemic.		
2019	Montreal, Quebec	Megha Sandhu	Unplaced		List: 1st Runner-up and 3rd Runner-up at Miss Universe Canada 2019 and 2018 respectively.; Top 36 at Miss Model of the World 2018; Previously Winner Miss Teenage Canada 2012.; Top 10 at Miss Teen World 2012
2018	Toronto, Ontario	Camila Gonzalez	Unplaced		List: 1st Runner-up and 3rd Runner-up at Miss Universe Canada 2018 and 2016 respectively.; Previously Top 8 at Miss All Nations 2016; Unplaced at Both Reina Hispanoamericana 2017 and Reinado Internacional del Café 2017
2017	Windsor, Ontario	Marta Stępień	Unplaced		List: Later winner of Miss Universe Canada 2018.; Top 10 at Miss Universe 2018; 1st Runner-up at Miss Universe Canada 2017; 1st Runner-up at Reinado Internacional del Café 2018
2016	Windsor, Ontario	Amber Bernachi	Top 15		List: Later 1st Runner-up at Miss Global 2018.; Later winner of Miss Eco International 2017; 1st Runner-up and Top 12 at Miss Universe Canada 2016 and 2014 respectively.; 2nd Runner-up at Miss Earth Canada 2014.
2015	Wetaskiwin, Alberta	Kathryn Kohut	Unplaced		List: 2nd Runner-up and 4th Runner-up at Miss Universe Canada 2015 and 2017 respectively.; Previously 1st Runner-up at Miss Earth Canada 2014, appointed Miss Grand Canada 2014.; 2nd Runner-up at Miss Grand International 2014; Unplaced at Miss Universe Canada 2013
2014	Toronto, Ontario	Kesiah Papasin	Unplaced		List: Previously 3rd Runner-up, 1st Runner-up and 2nd Runner-up at Miss Universe Canada 2012, 2014 and 2016 respectively.; Top 10 at Miss World Canada 2017; Unplaced at All three International Beauty Contest, Miss Continente Americano 2012 (won Miss Congeniality), Miss Intercontinental 2012 and Reinado Internacional del Café 2015.
2013	Ottawa, Ontario	Sarah Ainsley Harrison	Unplaced		List: 2x CBBF National Bikini Champion (2015 and 2016); 3rd Runner-up at Miss Universe Canada 2014, Top 12 at both Miss Universe Canada 2012 and 2013.
2012	Hamilton, Ontario	Marta Jablonska	Unplaced		
Canada Withdrew from Miss International 2011.
2010	Uxbridge, Ontario	Katie Starke	Unplaced		List: 3rd Runner-up and Top 12 at Miss Universe Canada 2012 and 2010 respectively.; Later Top 20 at Miss Supranational 2012; Previously winner of Miss Teen Canada-World 2008.; Top 10 at Miss Teen World 2010
2009	Caledon, Ontario	Chanel Beckenlehner	Top 15		List: Later won Miss Universe Canada 2014.; Unplaced at Miss Universe 2014; previously Top 12 at Miss Universe Canada 2009.; 4th Runner-up at Miss Earth Canada 2012; Unplaced at Both Miss Continente Americano 2010 and Reinado Internacional del Café 2011.
2008	Toronto, Ontario	Elena Semikina	Unplaced		List: Later won Miss Universe Canada 2010.; Unplaced at Miss Universe 2010; Previously Top 10 at Miss Universe Canada 2008.
2007	Toronto, Ontario	Justine Stewart	Unplaced		
2006	Toronto, Ontario	Emily Ann Kiss	Unplaced		List: Later Winner of Miss Global 2013.; 3rd Runner-up at Miss Universe Canada 2011.; Unplaced at Both World Miss University 2007 and Reinado Internacional del Café 2012.
2005	Edmonton, Alberta	Micaela Smith	Unplaced		
2004	Toronto, Ontario	Adelynn Cupino	Unplaced		List: Later Mrs. Philippines World 2022.; Unplaced at Mrs World 2022; Previously Semifinalist at Miss Petite International 2003.
2003	Alberta	Katarzyna Dziedzic	Unplaced		List: 1st Runner-up at Miss Polonia International 2004.

== See also ==
- Miss World Canada
- Miss Earth Canada
