= Anagabriela Espinoza =

Mexican model and beauty queen

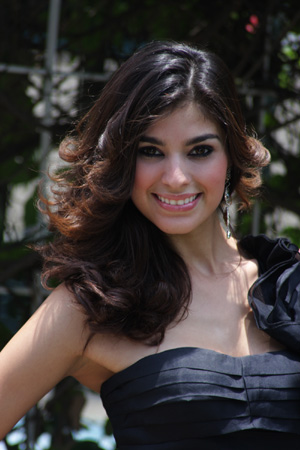
- Born: Anagabriela Espinoza Marroquín; April 18, 1988 (age 38); Monterrey, Nuevo León, Mexico
- Height: 5 ft 11 in (1.80 m)
- Beauty pageant titleholder
- Hair color: Brown
- Eye color: Light brown
- Major competitions: Nuestra Belleza Nuevo León 2007; (Winner); Nuestra Belleza México 2007; (Winner – Nuestra Belleza Mundo México); Miss World 2008; (Top 15); (Miss World Beach Beauty); Miss International 2009; (Winner); (Miss Glamour)

Anagabriela Espinoza Marroquín (born April 18, 1988) is a Mexican model and beauty queen, She was crowned Nuestra Belleza Mundo México 2007. She was a top 15 semifinalist in the Miss World 2008 pageant. The following year, she became the second Mexican to win the title of Miss International 2009.

== Pageant career ==
Espinoza began competing in beauty pageants at the age of 19 in her hometown of Monterrey, Nuevo León. She won her first title of Nuestra Belleza Nuevo León 2007 on July 25, which led her to compete nationally for the Nuestra Belleza México title.

On October 6, 2008, she went on to win the title of Nuestra Belleza Mundo México in Manzanillo, Colima, giving her the right to represent her country in the 58th edition of the Miss World 2008 pageant held at the Sanndton Convention Centre in Johannesburg, South Africa on December 13. Espinoza won the Miss World Beach Beauty fast track event and award, which automatically gave her a semifinal spot in the Miss World competition.

A year later, she competed once again on the international scene, representing her country in the 49th edition of the Miss International 2009 beauty pageant. Anagabriela became the second Mexican to win this title, beating out the 65 other contestants from all over the world on November 28, 2009, at Sichuan International Tennis Center in Chengdu, Sichuan, China.

== Personal life ==
Anagabriela works as a news presenter at FM Globo Monterrey 88.1 and MVSNoticias. She is the development manager at Parque Ecológico Chipinque.

She is married to surgeon Jesús Andrés Richer and is the mother of two girls, named Sara and Isabel, born on May 11, 2021.

Awards and achievements
| Preceded by (Spain) Alejandra Andreu | Miss International; 2009 | Succeeded by (Venezuela) Elizabeth Mosquera |
| Preceded by Lorenza Bernot | Nuestra Belleza Int'l México; 2009 | Succeeded by Gabriela Palacio |
| Preceded by (Dominican Republic) Ada de la Cruz | Miss World Beach Beauty; 2008 | Succeeded by (Gibraltar) Kaiane Aldorino |
| Preceded by Carolina Morán | Nuestra Belleza Mundo México; 2007 | Succeeded by Perla Beltrán |
