= Miss International 2009 =

Beauty pageant edition

- Date: November 28, 2009
- Presenters: Liu Yi Wei; Li Ai
- Venue: Sichuan International Tennis Center, Chengdu, Sichuan, China
- Broadcaster: CDTV-2; BS Asahi
- Entrants: 65
- Placements: 15
- Debuts: Cuba; Gabon; Georgia; Kyrgyzstan; Uganda
- Withdrawals: Guatemala; Hawaii; Italy; Liberia; New Zealand; Republic of the Congo; Serbia; Suriname; Sri Lanka; Sweden; Ukraine; Zambia
- Returns: Honduras; Martinique; Moldova; Netherlands; Nicaragua; Northern Mariana Islands; Romania; South Africa; Sudan
- Winner: Anagabriela Espinoza; Mexico

Miss International 2009 was the 49th Miss International pageant, held at the Sichuan International Tennis Center in Chengdu, Sichuan, China, on November 28, 2009. The pageant was originally scheduled to be held on November 7, 2009 at The Venetian Macao in Macau, but the host committee backed out.

Alejandra Andreu of Spain crowned Anagabriela Espinoza of Mexico as her successor at the end of the event.

== Results ==
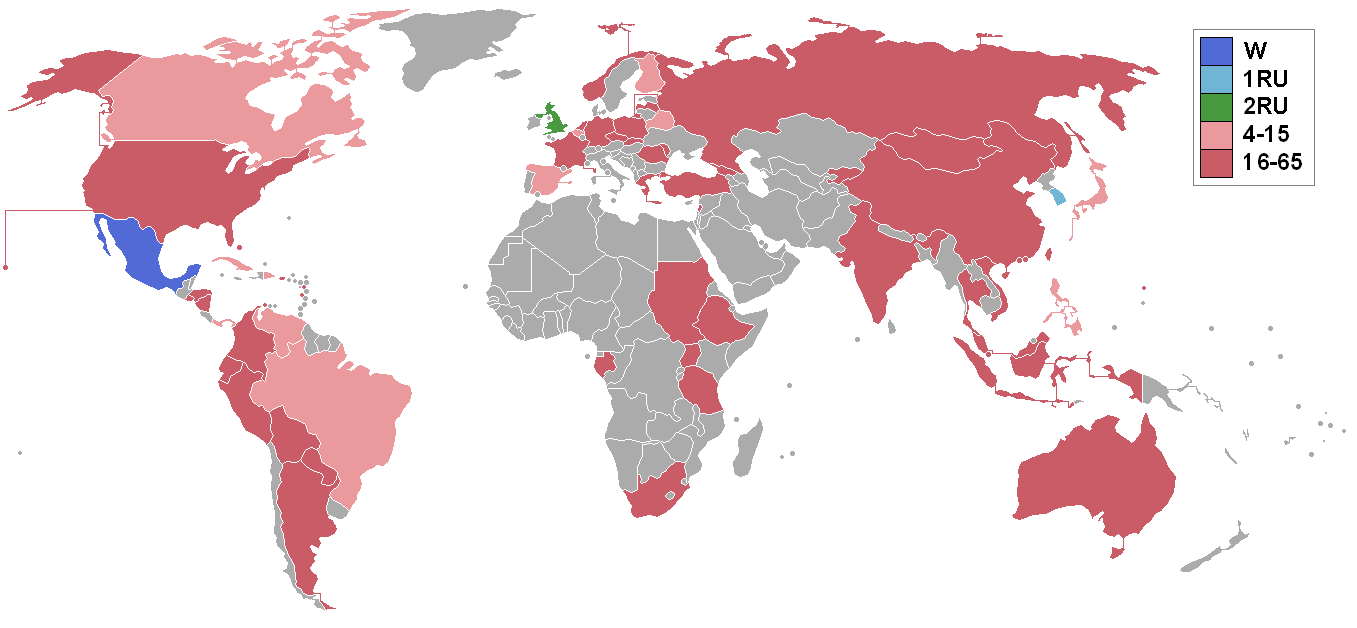
Countries and territories which sent delegates and results

=== Placements ===
Placement	Contestant
Miss International 2009	Mexico – Anagabriela Espinoza
1st Runner-Up	South Korea – Seo Eun-mi
2nd Runner-Up	United Kingdom – Chloe-Beth Morgan
Top 15	Belarus – Yana Supranovich; Belgium – Cassandra D'Ermilio; Brazil – Rayanne Morais; Canada – Chanel Beckenlehner; Cuba – Patricia Rosales; Dominican Republic – Victoria Fernández; Finland – Linda Wikstedt; Japan – Yuka Nakayama; Panama – Joyce Jacobi; Philippines – Melody Gersbach †; Spain – Melania Santiago; Venezuela – Laksmi Rodriguez

== Number of contestants ==
According to the official website, 73 contestants were expected to attend the pageant, but only 65 contestants showed up to compete for the coveted title.

Contestants from Italy and Suriname withdrew before the pageant started. While, contestants from Guam, Guatemala, Kenya, Sudan, Ukraine withdrew 10 days after the pageant started, only 66 contestants continued at the competition. A day before the grand final, Costa Rica and Nigeria confirmed not arrived at Chengdu, China due both of them had visa problems, marking the number of contestants decreased to 64. Sudan finally arrived at Chengdu to attend the preliminary judging, rehearsals and the grand final with others contestants. The number of contestants finally increased to 65.

== Contestants ==
Country/Territory	Contestant	Age	Height	Hometown
Argentina	María Mercedes Viaña	19	174 cm (5 ft 8 1/2 in)	Santiago del Estero
Aruba	Christina Trejo	21	175 cm (5 ft 9 in)	Companashi
Australia	Kelly Louise Macguire	23	174 cm (5 ft 8 1/2 in)	Sydney
Bahamas	Aisha Delaney	21	178 cm (5 ft 10 in)	Nassau
Belarus	Yana Supranovich	21	180 cm (5 ft 11 in)	Minsk
Belgium	Cassandra D'Ermilio	21	175 cm (5 ft 9 in)	Quaregnon
Bolivia	Laura Olivera	18	173 cm (5 ft 8 in)	Yacuiba
Brazil	Rayanne Morais	21	174 cm (5 ft 8 1/2 in)	Divinópolis
Canada	Chanel Beckenlehner	21	173 cm (5 ft 8 in)	Toronto
China	Wang Qian	19	171 cm (5 ft 7 1/2 in)	Chengdu
Colombia	Lina Mosquera	20	180 cm (5 ft 11 in)	Quibdó
Cuba	Patricia Rosales	23	179 cm (5 ft 10 1/2 in)	Niquero
Czech Republic	Darja Jacukevičová	22	180 cm (5 ft 11 in)	Veselí nad Moravou
Dominican Republic	Victoria Fernández	22	178 cm (5 ft 10 in)	Santiago
Ecuador	Isabella Chiriboga	20	174 cm (5 ft 8 1/2 in)	Quito
El Salvador	Vanessa Hueck	22	178 cm (5 ft 10 in)	San Salvador
Ethiopia	Rahel Woldekirkos	24	178 cm (5 ft 10 in)	Addis Ababa
Finland	Linda Wikstedt	20	174 cm (5 ft 8 1/2 in)	Helsinki
France	Mathilde Muller	20	176 cm (5 ft 9 1/2 in)	Valence
Gabon	Cynthia Mobumba	22	172 cm (5 ft 7 1/2 in)	Ngounié
Georgia	Maria Sarchimelia	25	174 cm (5 ft 8 1/2 in)	Tbilisi
Germany	Valora Roucek	19	168 cm (5 ft 6 in)	Cologne
Greece	Diana Igropoulou	19	177 cm (5 ft 9 1/2 in)	Athens
Guadeloupe	Joelle Clamy	25	184 cm (6 ft 1/2 in)	Petit-Canal
Honduras	Kenia Andrade	23	170 cm (5 ft 7 in)	Los Angeles
Hong Kong	Germaine Li	22	170 cm (5 ft 7 in)	Hong Kong
India	Harshita Saxena	22	175 cm (5 ft 9 in)	Panaji
Indonesia	Ayu Diandra Sari Tjakra	21	175 cm (5 ft 9 in)	Denpasar
Japan	Yuka Nakayama	19	173 cm (5 ft 8 in)	Fukuoka
Kyrgyzstan	Altynai Ismankulova	21	170 cm (5 ft 7 in)	Bishkek
Latvia	Anda Pudule	22	173 cm (5 ft 8 in)	Riga
Lebanon	Sarah Mansour	20	174 cm (5 ft 8 1/2 in)	Beirut
Macau	Yvonne Yang	21	179 cm (5 ft 10 1/2 in)	Macau
Malaysia	Tay Tze Juan	20	173 cm (5 ft 8 in)	Batu Pahat
Martinique	Nathaly Peters	19	175 cm (5 ft 9 in)	Fort de France
Mexico	Anagabriela Espinoza	21	180 cm (5 ft 11 in)	Monterrey
Moldova	Catalina Stascu	18	173 cm (5 ft 8 in)	Chişinău
Mongolia	Badamgerel Khurelbaatar	19	178 cm (5 ft 10 in)	Ulaanbaatar
Netherlands	Roline Hund	20	174 cm (5 ft 8 1/2 in)	Almere
Nicaragua	Slilma Ulloa	23	168 cm (5 ft 6 in)	Matagalpa
Northern Mariana Islands	Sorene Maratita	19	163 cm (5 ft 4 in)	Saipan
Norway	Beatrice Delås	18	175 cm (5 ft 9 in)	Sellebakk
Panama	Joyce Jacobi	21	170 cm (5 ft 7 in)	David
Paraguay	Romina Bogado	25	175 cm (5 ft 9 in)	Asunción
Peru	Alejandra Pezet	20	176 cm (5 ft 9 1/2 in)	Lima
Philippines	Melody Gersbach †	23	175 cm (5 ft 9 in)	Daraga
Poland	Angelika Jakubowska	20	176 cm (5 ft 9 1/2 in)	Lubań
Puerto Rico	Mónica Pastrana	20	178 cm (5 ft 10 in)	Manatí
Romania	Iuliana Capsuc	20	174 cm (5 ft 8 1/2 in)	Bucharest
Russia	Ksenia Hrabovskaya	18	176 cm (5 ft 9 1/2 in)	Khabarovsk
Singapore	Annabelle Liang	23	169 cm (5 ft 6 1/2 in)	Singapore
Slovakia	Soňa Skoncová	22	174 cm (5 ft 8 1/2 in)	Prievidza
South Africa	Bokang Montjane	23	174 cm (5 ft 8 1/2 in)	Johannesburg
South Korea	Seo Eun-mi	22	175 cm (5 ft 9 in)	Seoul
Spain	Melania Santiago	21	174 cm (5 ft 8 1/2 in)	Málaga
Sudan	Suna William	23	168 cm (5 ft 6 in)	Darfur
Taiwan	Yi Chih Chen	22	168 cm (5 ft 6 in)	Taipei
Tanzania	Illuminata James	24	176 cm (5 ft 9 1/2 in)	Mwanza
Thailand	Picha Nampradit	23	178 cm (5 ft 10 in)	Kanchanaburi
Turkey	Begüm Yılmaz	21	180 cm (5 ft 11 in)	İzmir
Uganda	Pierra Akwero	22	177 cm (5 ft 9 1/2 in)	Entebbe
United Kingdom	Chloe-Beth Morgan	23	171 cm (5 ft 7 1/2 in)	Cwmbran
United States	Aileen Jan Yap	21	170 cm (5 ft 7 in)	Houston
Venezuela	Laksmi Rodríguez	24	178 cm (5 ft 10 in)	San Cristóbal
Vietnam	Trần Thị Quỳnh	24	175 cm (5 ft 9 in)	Hai Phong
