= Ashley Callingbull =

Canadian beauty pageant titleholder (born 1989)

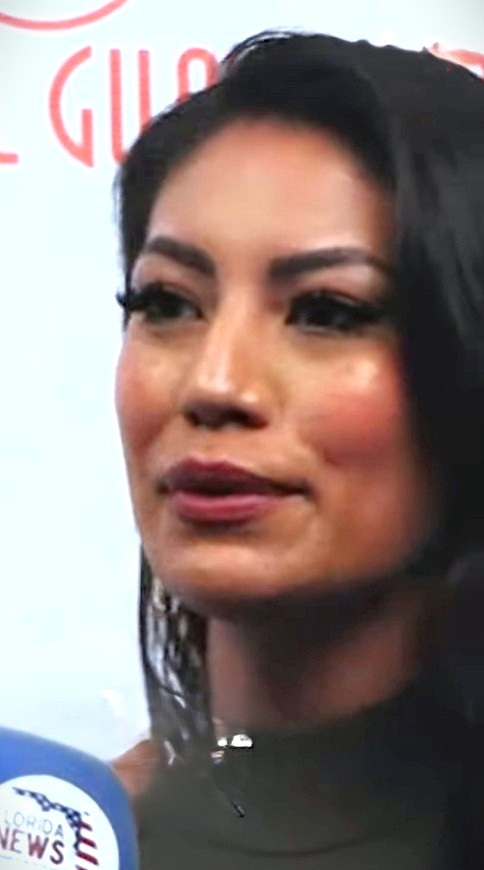
- Callingbull in 2024
- Born: October 21, 1989 (age 37); Enoch Cree Nation, Alberta, Canada
- Height: 5 ft 10 in (178 cm)
- Beauty pageant titleholder
- Title: Mrs. Universe 2015; Miss Universe Canada 2024
- Major competitions: Miss Universe Canada 2010 (2nd Runner-up); Miss World Canada 2012 (Top 10); Miss Universe Canada 2013 (Top 20); Mrs. Universe 2015 (Winner); Miss Universe Canada 2024 (Winner); Miss Universe 2024 (Top 12)
- Website: ashleycallingbull.com

Ashley Callingbull (born October 21, 1989) is a Canadian beauty pageant titleholder, who won Mrs. Universe 2015 and represented Canada at Miss Universe 2024, where she reached the top 12. She was the first Indigenous First Nations woman to become a Sports Illustrated Swimsuit Model.

Callingbull and her stepfather competed in The Amazing Race Canada 4, and the second Amazing Race Devon, a local youth fundraiser, in which they were second.

== Life and career ==
Ashley Callingbull was born in Enoch Cree Nation near Edmonton in Alberta, to Cree parents. By the age of 10, she had consecutively won all Enoch's princess crowns in her community. She graduated from high school at the age of 16. Soon after, she began her University studies to pursue her Bachelor of Science, Communications, and an Arts degree focusing on drama and acting/television.

Callingbull was also chosen as Miss Canada for the Miss Friendship International Pageant held in Hubei, China in September 2010, and represented Canada at the Queen of the World Final held in Germany also in 2010.

She also represented Canada at Miss Humanity International in Barbados in October 2011.

Callingbull continues to educate the public on Indigenous knowledge, she spoke out against cultural appropriation in the Miss Universe Canada 2026 national costume competition.

She used her success to urge the First Nations band governments to vote to depose the Conservative Party of Canada in the 2015 federal election. Callingbull stated that the First Nation's concerns needed to be prominent in the campaign. While competing in Mrs. Universe, she wore a dress that aimed to raise awareness for missing and murdered Indigenous women, designed by Lesley Hampton.

In May 2022, she become the first Indigenous First Nations woman to be featured in a Sports Illustrated Swimsuit Issue.

As an actress, she has appeared in the television series Blackstone and the film The Great Salish Heist.

Callingbull appears with host Howie Mandel on Canadian game show The Price Is Right Tonight (2026 on).

== Personal life ==
Callingbull has said that she "never had the perfect childhood everyone dreams of. I had an incredibly difficult childhood and was raised mainly by my mother and grandparents...It was difficult to grow up the way I did, but it made me appreciate everything I have and most importantly made me the strong woman I am today."

Callingbull says she was drawn to the Mrs. Universe competition because of its domestic violence theme.

"I thought, this is a perfect platform for me because I'm relatable to people, I've experienced this myself and I'm able to speak about it," she said. "I'm glad I'm able to use this title as a way to speak for others that can't speak for themselves."

Awards and achievements
Preceded by Olga Torner	Mrs. Universe; 2015	Succeeded by Sabrina Pinion
Preceded by Madison Kvaltin	Miss Universe Canada; 2024	Succeeded by Jaime VandenBerg
