= Mrs. Universe =

International women's pageant

- Formation: 2007; 19 years ago
- Type: Beauty pageant
- Headquarters: Sofia, Bulgaria
- Location: Bulgaria
- Official language: English
- Website: mrsuniverseltd.com

Mrs. Universe is an annual international event for "the most honorable married woman". The event is open to married, divorced, and widowed women from nations on all continents around the world, who are between the ages of 18 and 55, have a family and career, and are involved in a "significant cause". It is based in Sofia, Bulgaria.

== Titleholders ==
Year	Country	Mrs. Universe	Location	Entrants
2026	Monaco	Isidora Rankovic	Colombo, Sri Lanka	130
2025	India	Sherry Singh	Manila, Philippines	120
2024	Belarus	Natalia Daroshka	Incheon, South Korea	110
2023	United States	Meranie Gadiana Rahman	Pasay City, Philippines	97
2022	Russia	Elena Maksimova	Sofia, Bulgaria	112
2021	Georgia	Ana Siradze	Seoul, South Korea	110
2020	Kazakhstan	Zhuldyz Abdukarimova	Virtual pageant	92
2019	Myanmar	Honey Cho	Guangzhou, China	90
2018	Monaco	Julia Gershun	Cebu, Philippines	85
2017	Vietnam	Tram Hoang Luu	Durban, South Africa	78
2016	Austria	Olga Torner	Guangzhou, China	60
2015	Canada	Ashley Callingbull	Minsk, Belarus	56
2014	United States	Sabrina Pinion	Kuala Lumpur, Malaysia	39
2013	Malaysia	Carol Lee	Oranjestad, Aruba	24
2012	Colombia	Layla Martínez	Rostov, Russia	Unknown
2011	Venezuela	Mayra Farias	Pleven, Bulgaria	Unknown
2010	Finland	Jennika Hannusaari	Riga, Latvia	Unknown
2009	Lithuania	Vaida Ragénaite	Vilnius, Lithuania	Unknown
2008	Latvia	Marika Gederte	Riga, Latvia	Unknown
2007	Bulgaria	Eleonora Mancheva	Sofia, Bulgaria	Unknown

== Controversies ==
The Mrs. Universe organization was sued in 2010 by the Miss Universe organization for an alleged breach of trademark. The Mrs. pageant countered that "Universe" is a generic word, and pointed out that the Mrs. pageant is exclusively for married women while the Miss pageant is for unmarried women. The Mrs. organization opined that the lawsuit was part of a conspiracy by human traffickers to stop the pageant, because Mrs. Universe held an awareness campaign about human trafficking. Five years after, the Miss Universe organization again threatened legal action against Mrs. Universe for breach of trademark. This came on the tails of comments made by Ashley Callingbull, the first Indigenous Canadian to win the title, when she criticized the Canadian government's lack of support of First Nations people.

The Mrs. Universe pageant has continued to run despite this controversy, arguing that it is a pageant for married, divorced, and widowed women while the Miss Universe pageant was restricted to women who have never been married. Beginning in 2023, however, the Miss Universe Organization will allow married or pregnant women to compete in the pageant.

== See also ==
- List of beauty contests
- Mrs. World
- Mrs. Globe
