= Sasha Abunnadi =

Canadian beauty pageant winner

Sasha Amira Abunnadi (born January 1,1984, in Abbotsford, British Columbia) was the first Miss BC World, and was elected for the reign of 2005/2006. She represented British Columbia at Miss World Canada on July 16, 2006, in Toronto, Ontario, where she placed in the Top 15 Semi-Finals, and won the award for "Best In Interview". Sasha also placed in the top 10 as a "Beauty with a Purpose Honourable Mention".

She is currently enrolled at her local university and is studying biology. Her hobbies include travelling, reading, swimming, and hiking, and she is inspired by Nazanin Afshin-Jam. She is fluent in French and English, and studies Arabic and Spanish. Sasha is also an aspiring model, and has participated in a number of fashion shows and print magazines across the province.

Age	Height	Weight	Sex
38	Unknown	Unknown	Female

== 2005/2006 Results ==
=== Miss World Canada: Top 15 Semi-Finalist ===
- Best in Interview Award
- Beauty With A Purpose Honourable Mention

=== Miss B.C. World: Sasha Abunnadi - Abbotsford ===
- 1st Runner-up: Colleen Williams - Surrey
- 2nd Runner-up: Sahar Biniaz - Richmond
- 3rd Runner-up: Tamara Blondin - Langley

Preceded by -	Miss B.C. World; 2005-2006	Succeeded by Natalie Standke
