= Samantha Tajik =

Iranian-Canadian model

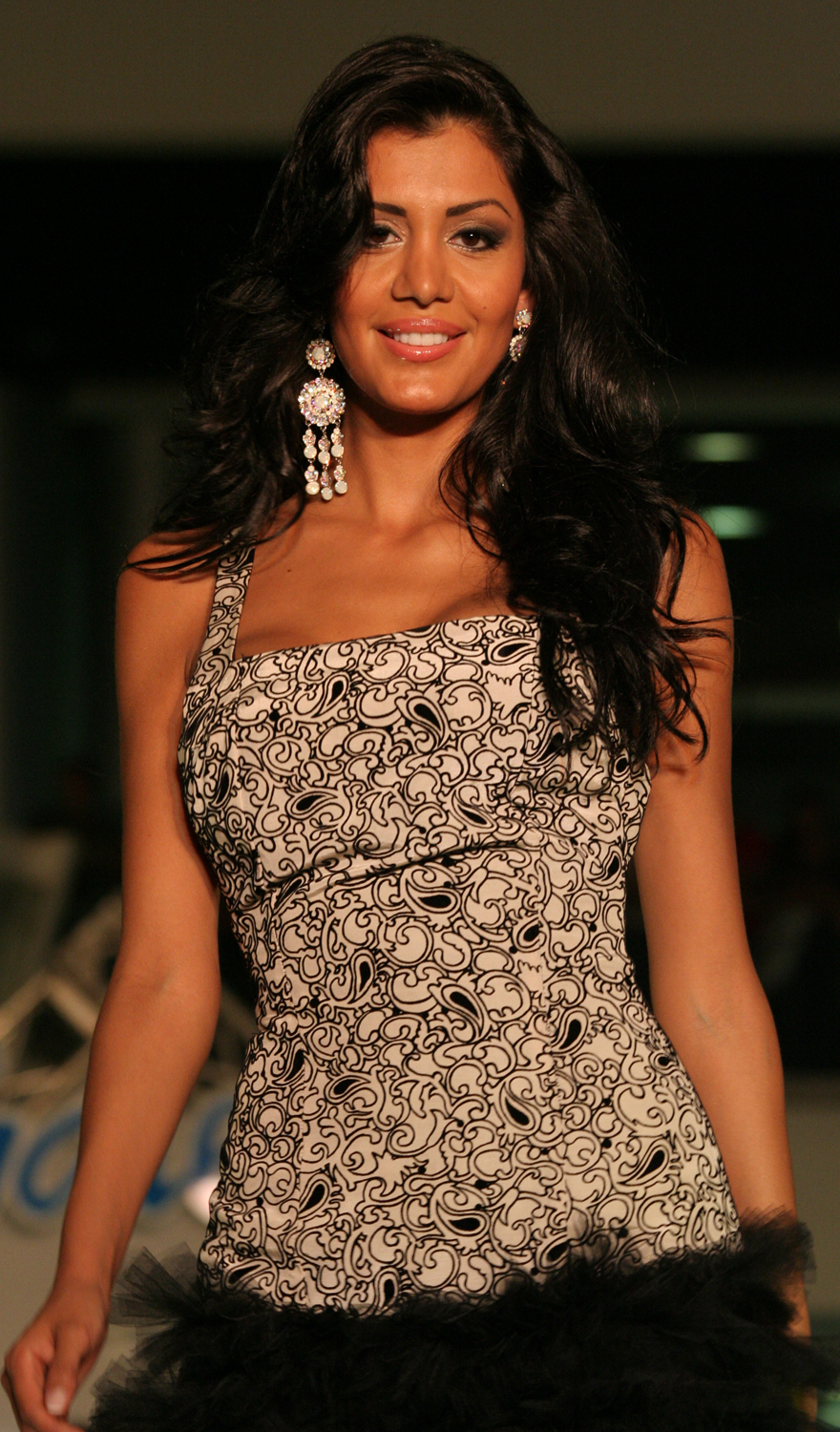
- Tajik in 2008
- Born: 1983 (age 42–43); Tehran, Iran
- Height: 1.77 m (5 ft 10 in)
- Beauty pageant titleholder
- Title: Miss Universe Canada 2008
- Hair colour: Black
- Eye colour: Brown
- Major competitions: Global Beauty Queen 2007 (2nd runner-up); International Model of The Year 2007 (Won); Miss Continente Americano 2008 (Won, Miss Congeniality); Miss Universe Canada 2008 (Winner); Miss Universe 2008 (Unplaced)

Samantha Tajik (Persian: سامانتا تاجیک; born 1983) is an Iranian Canadian actress, model, tv host and beauty pageant titleholder. She was crowned Miss Universe Canada 2008 on 28 April 2008 in Toronto, Ontario, and went on to represent Canada at the Miss Universe 2008 beauty pageant in Vietnam in July of that year. Tajik is the first Iranian-Canadian woman to have won the title of Miss Universe Canada; she has also excelled in the world of modelling, winning the title of International Model of the Year in 2007.

She went on to become the founder and director of SuperModel Canada Search.

== Modelling career ==
=== Official titles ===
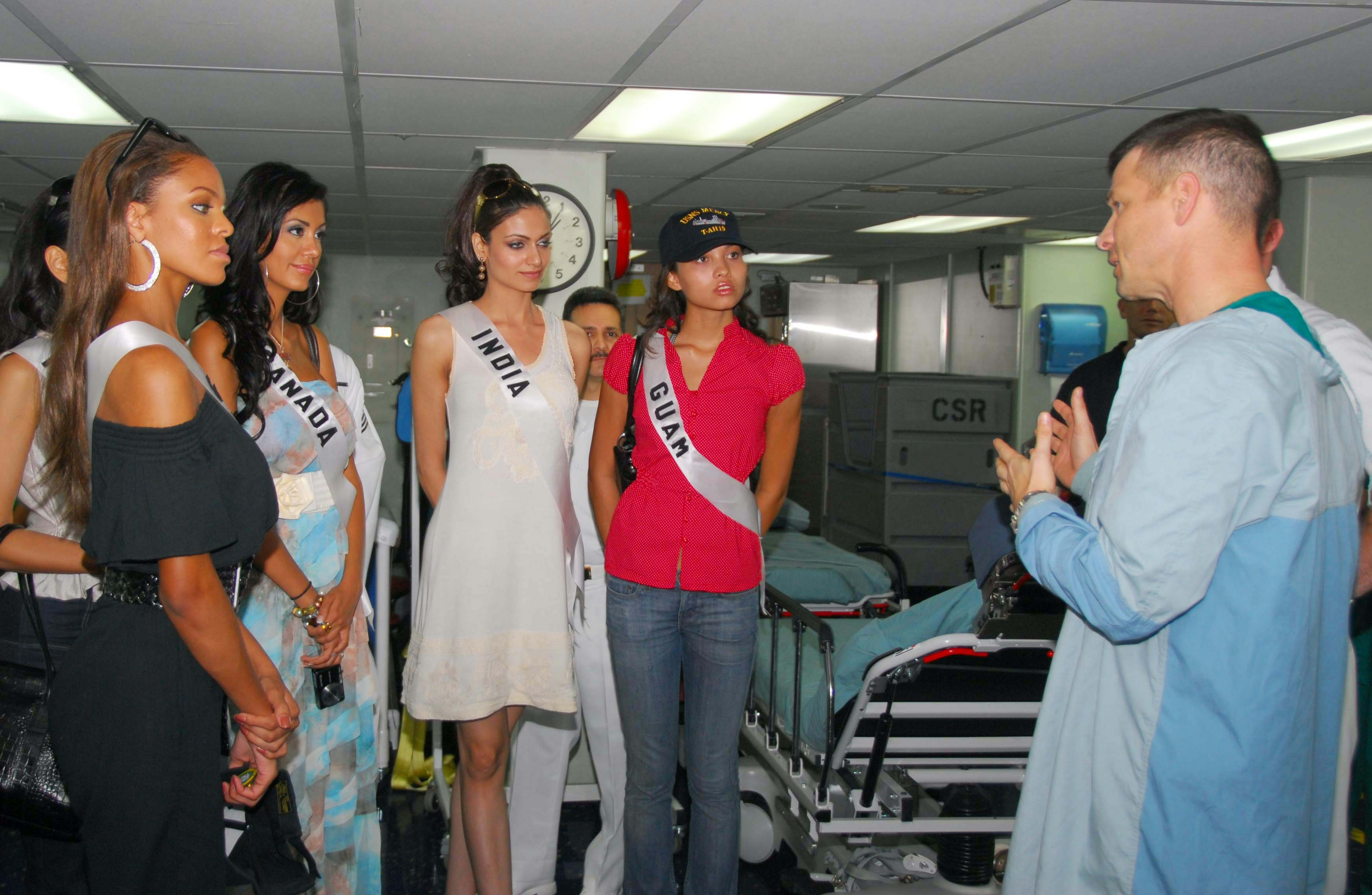
Tajik, with other Miss Universe contestants, tours USNS Mercy off the coast of Vietnam

- Miss Universe Canada 2008 – Winner
- Miss Continente Americano 2008 – Winner of Miss Congeniality
- International Model of the Year 2007 – Winner
- Global Beauty Queen 2007 – Second runner-up

Preceded by Inga Skaya	Miss Universe Canada; 2008	Succeeded by Mariana Valente
Preceded by Laura Salazar	Miss Continente Americano Canada; 2008	Succeeded by Mariana Valente
