= Russian Canadians =

Canadians with Russian ancestry

Русские канадцы
- Russian Canadians by census division (2021)

Total population
- 548,140 (by ancestry, 2021 Census)

Regions with significant populations
- Saskatchewan, Alberta, Yukon Territory, Toronto, Montreal, Vancouver

Languages
- Canadian English; Russian; French

Religion
- Christianity (mainly Orthodox); Judaism

Related ethnic groups
- Russian people; Russian Americans; Ukrainian Canadians; Belarusian Canadians

Russian Canadians comprise Canadian citizens of Russian heritage or Russians who immigrated to and reside in Canada. According to the 2021 Census, there were 548,140 Canadians who claimed full or partial Russian ancestry. The areas of Canada with the highest percentage population of Russian Canadians are the Prairie Provinces.

== Number of Russian Canadians ==
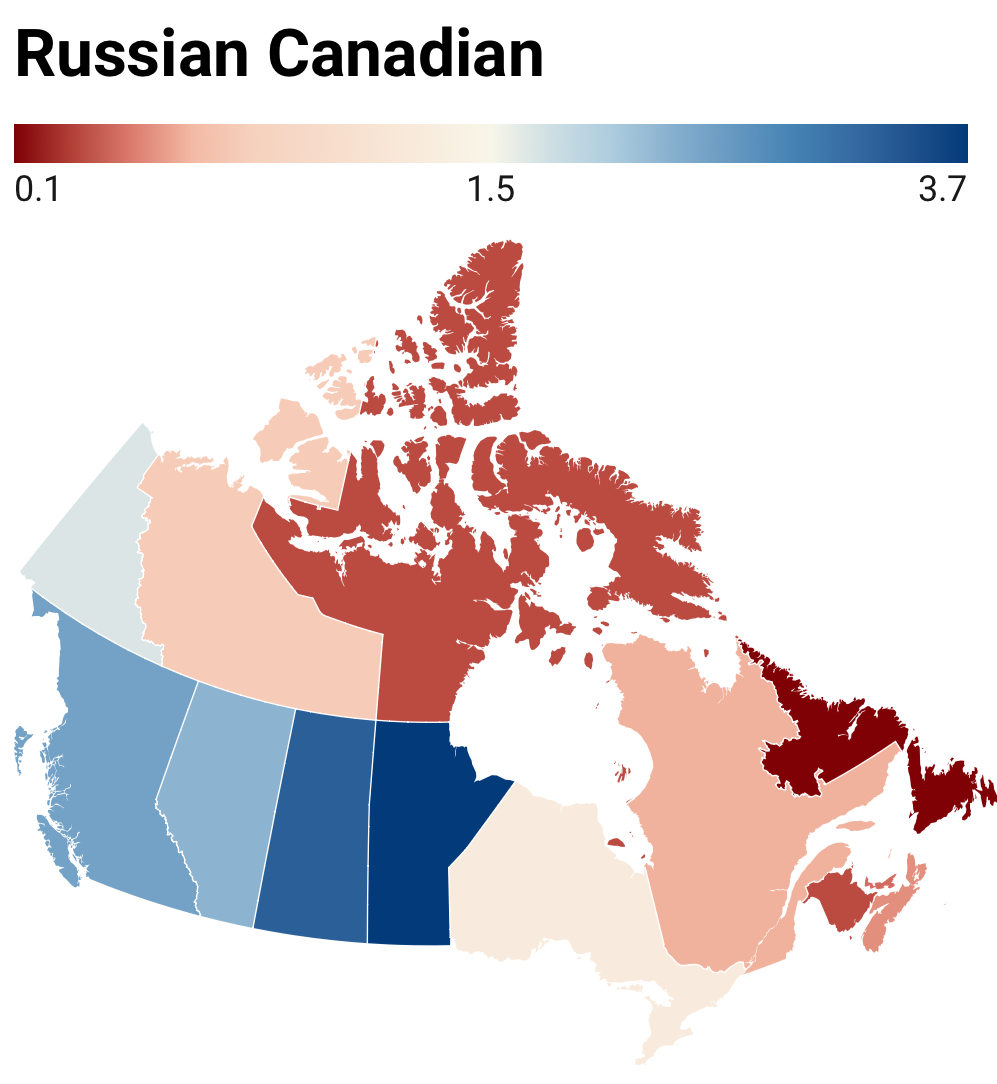
Russian percent in Canada by province/territory, 2021 census

Data from this section from Statistics Canada, 2016.

| | Percent |
|---|---|
| Newfoundland and Labrador | 0.2% |
| Prince Edward Island | 0.4% |
| Nova Scotia | 0.5% |
| New Brunswick | 0.3% |
| Quebec | 0.7% |
| Ontario | 1.7% |
| Manitoba | 4.7% |
| Saskatchewan | 3.7% |
| Alberta | 2.7% |
| British Columbia | 2.9% |
| Yukon | 2.3% |
| Northwest Territories | 1.2% |
| Nunavut | 0.3% |

Data from this section from Statistics Canada, 2016.

- Total: 622,445.
- Single response: 120,165.
- Multiple response: 502,280.

=== Provinces and CMAs (census metropolitan areas) with Russian Canadian populations over 10,000 ===
==== Quebec ====
Data in this section from Statistics Canada, 2016.

- Total: 55,230
- Single response: 15,800
- Multiple response: 39,435

===== Montréal (CMA) =====
Data in this section from Statistics Canada, 2016.

- Total: 49,275
- Single response: 14,315
- Multiple response: 34,960

==== Ontario ====
Data in this section from Statistics Canada, 2016.

- Total: 220,850
- Single response: 53,175
- Multiple response: 167,675

===== Toronto (CMA) =====
Data in this section from Statistics Canada, 2016.

- Total: 139,915
- Single response: 40,570
- Multiple response: 99,340

===== Ottawa-Gatineau (CMA - Ontario part) =====
Data in this section from Statistics Canada, 2016.

- Total: 15,620 (represents ~90% of total Ottawa-Gatineau CMA)
- Single response: 3,205
- Multiple response: 12,415

==== Manitoba ====
Data in this section from Statistics Canada, 2016.

- Total: 58,225
- Single response: 9,510
- Multiple response: 48,720

===== Winnipeg (CMA) =====
Data in this section from Statistics Canada, 2016.

- Total: 29,575
- Single response: 3,580
- Multiple response: 26,000

==== Saskatchewan ====
Data in this section from Statistics Canada, 2016.

- Total: 39,390
- Single response: 3,645
- Multiple response: 35,745

===== Saskatoon (CMA) =====
Data in this section from Statistics Canada, 2016.

- Total: 13,280
- Single response: 1,360
- Multiple response: 11,925

==== Alberta ====
Data in this section from Statistics Canada, 2016.

- Total: 107,800
- Single response: 14,320
- Multiple response: 93,480

===== Calgary (CMA) =====
Data in this section from Statistics Canada, 2016.

- Total: 37,955
- Single response: 6,125
- Multiple response: 31,830

===== Edmonton (CMA) =====
Data in this section from Statistics Canada, 2016.

- Total: 28,275
- Single response: 3,325
- Multiple response: 24,945

==== British Columbia ====
Data in this section from Statistics Canada, 2016.

- Total: 131,060
- Single response: 22,145
- Multiple response: 108,910

===== Vancouver (CMA) =====
Data in this section from Statistics Canada, 2016.

- Total: 58,535
- Single response: 11,145
- Multiple response: 47,395

Many British Columbians of Russian descent are Doukhobors, historically concentrated in the West Kootenay and Boundary Country regions.

== Religion ==
Russian Canadian demography by religion
| Religious group | 2021 (Note: Religious breakdown proportions based on "Russian" ethnic or cultural origin responses on the 2021 census.) | | 2001 (Note: Religious breakdown proportions based on "Russian" ethnic or cultural origin responses on the 2001 census.) | |
| Religious group | Pop. | % | Pop. | % |
|---|---|---|---|---|
| Christianity | 253,035 | 46.16% | 213,435 | 63.15% |
| Islam | 3,980 | 0.73% | 1,295 | 0.38% |
| Judaism | 57,125 | 10.42% | 36,270 | 10.73% |
| Irreligion | 227,810 | 41.56% | 84,730 | 25.07% |
| Buddhism | 1,090 | 0.2% | 815 | 0.24% |
| Hinduism | 270 | 0.05% | 70 | 0.02% |
| Sikhism | 85 | 0.02% | 70 | 0.02% |
| Indigenous spirituality | 265 | 0.05% | 435 | 0.13% |
| Other | 4,485 | 0.82% | 900 | 0.27% |
| Total Russian Canadian population | 548,145 | 100% | 337,965 | 100% |

Russian Canadian demography by Christian sects
| Religious group | 2021 | | 2001 | |
| Religious group | Pop. | % | Pop. | % |
|---|---|---|---|---|
| Catholic | 50,505 | 19.96% | 49,530 | 23.21% |
| Orthodox | 59,285 | 23.43% | 33,405 | 15.65% |
| Protestant | 81,130 | 32.06% | 111,250 | 52.12% |
| Other Christian | 62,115 | 24.55% | 19,250 | 9.02% |
| Total Russian Canadian Christian population | 253,035 | 100% | 213,435 | 100% |

== List of notable Russian Canadians ==
=== Arts, entertainment and literature ===
- Harvey Atkin – voice-over actor
- Alex Battler – writer
- Arnold Belkin – painter
- Sasha Clements – actress, Majority Rules!
- Ludmilla Chiriaeff – ballet dancer, choreographer and company director
- Victor Garber – actor, Titanic, Argo, Star Trek
- Natalie Glebova – Miss Universe 2005, Miss Universe Canada 2005
- Anais Granofsky – actress, Degrassi Junior High
- Michelle Gurevich – singer, formerly known as "Chinawoman"
- Boris Hambourg – cellist
- Melissa Hayden – ballet dancer
- Inna Korobkina – actress
- Julia Ivanova - documentary filmmaker
- Jessica Parker Kennedy – actress, The Secret Circle, Smallville, Black Sails
- Nadia Litz – actress
- Elena Lobsanova – ballet dancer
- George London – singer
- Eli Mandel – poet
- Catherine Manoukian – violinist
- Niall Matter – actor, Eureka, Stargate Atlantis, Melrose Place, 90210
- Sophie Milman – jazz musician
- Zara Nelsova – cellist
- Greta Onieogou - actress
- Alex Ozerov - actor
- Kim Yaroshevskaya - actress, voice-over, story-teller and writer
- Sarah Polley – actress and film director, Order of Canada
- Duncan Regehr – writer and actor, Star Trek
- Sasha Roiz – actor
- Aleksei Serebryakov – actor
- Elena Semikina – Miss Universe Canada 2010
- Socalled – musician
- Ksenia Solo – actress, Black Swan
- Madeline Sonik – writer
- Jessica Trisko – Miss Earth 2007
- Boris Volkoff - ballet master, choreographer, "the father of Canadian ballet"
- Watts – produced for Method Man, Redman, and Snoop Dogg
- Adele Wiseman – author
- Chloe Stroll - singer-songwriter

=== Business and other ===
- Bluma Appel – philanthropist, recipient of the Order of Canada and Order of Ontario
- Charles Bronfman – billionaire, member of the Bronfman family
- Edgar Bronfman, Sr. – billionaire, member of the Bronfman family
- Saidye Rosner Bronfman – billionaire, member of the Bronfman family, founder of the Seagram Company
- Samuel Bronfman – billionaire, member of the Bronfman family
- Arcadi Gaydamak – businessman
- Ben Hatskin – founder of the Winnipeg Jets
- Gregory Lekhtman – inventor of exercise boots
- Sonia Scurfield – owner of the Calgary Flames in the 1980s and 1990s
- Alex Shnaider – co-founder of the Midland Group, partner in the Trump International Hotel and Tower (Toronto)
- Lawrence Stroll – businessman, part-owner and executive chairman of Aston Martin, and the owner of the Aston Martin F1 Team

=== Politics ===
- Grand Duchess Olga Alexandrovna of Russia – Russian Princess and youngest sister of Tsar Nicholas II of Russia
- Alex Atamanenko – Member of Parliament in the House of Commons of Canada
- Vasile Balabanov – Imperial Russian émigré
- Martin Dobkin – mayor of Mississauga
- Catherine Doherty – Imperial Russian émigré, social activist, recipient of the Order of Canada
- Siegfried Enns – member of the House of Commons of Canada
- Lois Hole – Lieutenant Governor of Alberta
- George Ignatieff – Canadian diplomat
- Michael Ignatieff – author, journalist, academic, politician
- Ted Lipman – diplomat, ambassador to North Korea, and South Korea
- Tim Moen – former leader of the Libertarian Party of Canada
- Tom Nevakshonoff – Member of the Legislative Assembly of Manitoba
- Reynold Rapp – Member of the House of Commons of Canada
- John Tory – mayor of Toronto
- Peter Vasilevich Verigin – Doukhobor leader
- Pyotr Verzilov – activist
- Roman Baber – Member of the Legislative Assembly of Ontario

=== Science ===
- Gregory Chamitoff – NASA astronaut and engineer
- Michel Chossudovsky – writer and professor of economics at the University of Ottawa
- Andrew Donskov – professor of modern languages at the University of Ottawa; world-renowned Leo Tolstoy expert
- Israel Halperin – mathematician
- Martin Kamen – physicist, member of the Manhattan Project (first nuclear bomb); discovered the synthesis of the isotope carbon-14
- Harry Medovy – pediatrician and academic, Order of Canada
- Pierre Milman – mathematician, Fellow of the Royal Society of Canada
- Sergei Plekhanov – Professor of Political Science at York University; former deputy director of the Institute for US and Canadian Studies in Russia
- Louis Slotin – physicist, member of the Manhattan Project (first nuclear bomb)
- George Volkoff, OC, MBE, FRSC – physicist who helped discover the existence of neutron stars
- Leonid Ivanovich Strakhovsky - professor, pioneered Slavic studies at the University of Toronto

=== Sports ===
- Ivan Babikov – Olympic cross-country skier
- Artur Beterbiev – professional boxer
- Patricia Bezzoubenko – rhythmic gymnast
- Boris Blumin – chess grandmaster
- Mark Bluvshtein – chess grandmaster
- Debbie Brill – high-jumper
- Édouard Carpentier – professional wrestler
- Joshua Ho-Sang – hockey player with the OHL
- Mike Chernoff – ice hockey
- Rob Chernoff – swimmer
- Tim Cheveldae – ice hockey
- Kevin Cheveldayoff – ice hockey
- Yelena Davydova – gymnastics
- Shawn Horcoff – ice hockey
- Igor Ivanov – chess grandmaster
- Pete Knight – rodeo bronc rider
- Chuck Kobasew – ice hockey
- Lioudmila Kortchaguina – marathon runner
- Crazy Leo – rally driver
- Andrei Markov – NHL hockey player
- Olya Ovtchinnikova – Olympic fencer
- Andrei Rogozine – world champion figure skater
- Mikhail "Misha" Goikhberg – racing driver
- Bobbie Rosenfeld – Olympic gold medalist
- Denis Shapovalov – tennis player
- Igor Tikhomirov – Olympic champion in fencing
- Marina Zoueva – ice dancing coach and choreographer
- Lance Stroll – racing driver competing in Formula One racing for Aston Martin.
- Stephen Gogolev – figure skater.

== See also ==
- Canada–Russia relations
- European Canadians
- Polish Canadians
- Ukrainian Canadians
