= Renata Soñé =

Dominican-American beauty queen

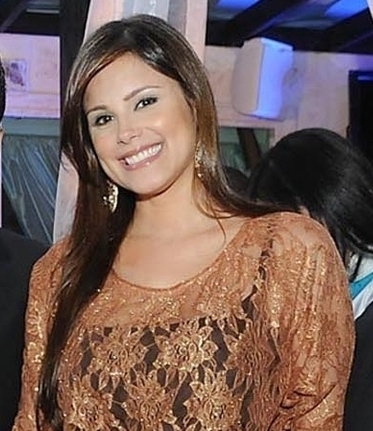
- Soñé (December 30, 2011)
- Born: August 6, 1982 (age 44); New York City, U.S.
- Height: 6 ft 0 in (1.83 m)
- Spouse: Eduardo Guerra Gutiérrez (m. 2006)
- Children: 2
- Beauty pageant titleholder
- Title: Miss Dominican Republic Universe 2005
- Hair color: Brown
- Eye color: Brown
- Major competitions: Miss Dominican Republic 2005 (Winner); Miss Universe 2005 (2nd Runner-up)

Renata De Jesús Soñé Savery (born August 6, 1982 in New York City) is an American-born Dominican actress, model and beauty pageant titleholder. She was the 2nd Runner-Up at Miss Universe 2005 after winning Miss Dominican Republic 2005.

== Life and career ==
At six months of age, Soñé was left in the care of her grandparents after her mother's death. She went on to pursue a degree in clinical psychology before participating in the Miss Dominican Republic pageant. Of her long-term career goals, Soñé has said she wishes to found a children's institute to continue her interest as a psychologist. To this end, she has been the spokesperson for many campaigns headed by Dominican Attorney General Rossana Reyes designed to discourage child neglect, and curtail the high number of abandoned children through education and public awareness.

Prior to winning the national pageant, Soñé was a professional model with Ossygeno Model Management, appearing in several Dominican fashion periodicals. Soñé has since become the official face of Pantene shampoo, Avon, and the Esbelle weight loss product.

== Pageant participation ==
=== Miss Dominican Republic 2005 ===
Soñé competed in the Miss Dominican Republic 2005 pageant on April 9, 2005, representing Distrito Nacional, where she won the title and gained the right to represent the Dominican Republic at Miss Universe.

=== Miss Universe 2005 ===
She went on to compete in the Miss Universe 2005 pageant held in Bangkok, Thailand, where she finished third overall (2nd runner-up), ahead of Mónica Spear (Venezuela) and Laura Elizondo (Mexico) and behind Cynthia Olavarría (Puerto Rico) and winner Natalie Glebova (Canada). She appears in the Miss Universe Organization's book "Universal Beauty" as the contestant with the best body in the history of the pageant.

== Film and television ==
She made her screen debut in the Dominican film Un Macho de Mujer (2006), which starred Venezuelan television host Daniel Sarcos. and hosted the weekly television dating show, Cupido (Cupid) in 2008. She currently hosts a daily television show "Todo Bien" on Antena Latina.

Apart from hosting "Todo Bien", she currently hosts her own radio show "Renata Soñé por la 91" every Sunday. The show focuses on music from the 70s, 80s and 90s. Soñé is set to star in the thriller "Intercambio" in the spring of 2011, a co-production of Virafilms and Alfa Films in which she plays detective Ximena Salba.

== Business ==
Soñé became an entrepreneur in 2006 when she successfully launched her own luxury collection of eyeglasses Renata Soñé Eye Wear.

== Personal life ==
She dated professional tennis player Jorge Dueñas. She married her childhood sweetheart, businessman Eduardo Guerra Gutiérrez on June 14, 2006, in a ceremony in Casa de Campo. The couple has two sons, Ignacio de Jesús born in late 2006 and Rodrigo Antonio born in October 2011.

Awards and achievements
Preceded by (Puerto Rico) Alba Reyes	Miss Universe 2nd Runner-Up; 2005	Succeeded by (Switzerland) Lauriane Gilliéron
Preceded by Larimar Fiallo	Miss Dominican Republic; 2005	Succeeded by Mía Taveras
Preceded by Yadira Geara	Miss Distrito Nacional; 2005	Succeeded by Dawilda González
