= Bohuňovice =

Bohuňovice may refer to places in the Czech Republic:

- Bohuňovice (Olomouc District), a municipality and village in the Olomouc Region
- Bohuňovice (Svitavy District), a municipality and village in the Pardubice Region
