= Lauriane Gilliéron =

Swiss model (born 1984)

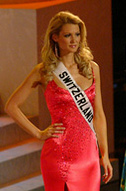
- Gilliéron at Miss Universe 2006
- Born: 25 July 1984 (age 42); Lausanne, Vaud, Switzerland
- Occupations: Actress, Model
- Height: 1.70 m (5 ft 7 in)
- Beauty pageant titleholder
- Title: Miss Switzerland 2005
- Hair color: Blonde
- Eye color: Brown
- Major competitions: Miss Switzerland 2005 (Winner); Miss World 2005 (Unplaced); Miss Universe 2006 (2nd Runner-up)

Lauriane Gilliéron (born 25 July 1984) is a Swiss actress, model and beauty pageant titleholder who was crowned Miss Switzerland 2005 on 21 September 2005 and represented Switzerland at Miss World 2005 in China but unplaced, she also competed at Miss Universe 2006 in United States where she placed 2nd runner-up.

== Personal life ==
She was born in Lausanne and grew up in the village of Prilly where her father is mayor. Since the age of seven, Gilliéron has been a vegetarian and by 2017 she had become a vegan. She is the eldest of four children. She speaks French as well as some German, some Italian and some English.

== Career ==
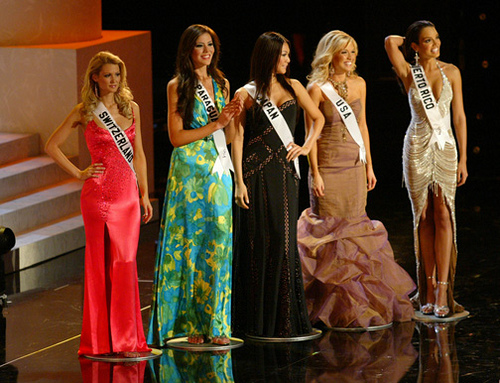
Gilliéron (left) as finalist in Miss Universe

Gilliéron went to the Miss Universe 2006 pageant as one of the favorites. Her performance in the finals earned her a placement of 2nd runner-up at the beauty pageant, which took place in Los Angeles on 23 July 2006. It became Switzerland's best placement in this international event. The previous best record was a 3rd runner-up in 1983.

Gilliéron was second in the Swiss Latin Dance Championships in 2002 and 2003, and has represented Switzerland internationally in Latin Dance competitions. After her election as Miss Switzerland, Gilliéron competed in Miss World 2005 but did not place.

In 2009, she appeared in the episode "May Divorce Be With You" (season 3, episode 11) on Rules of Engagement.

Gilliéron has been the recurring female foil in the Nespresso commercials with George Clooney.

== Television appearances ==
Year	Title	Role	Other notes
2008	Days of Our Lives	Michelle	
2009	Rules of Engagement	Hostess	Episode: "May Divorce Be With You"
2011	Turbo Dates	Marlene	Episode: "Time Stands Still"
2011	Love Bites	Cheri	Episode: "Boys to Men"
2011	Friends with Benefits	Cecile	Episode: "The Benefit of Friends"
2011	The Bold and the Beautiful		2 episodes
2012	CSI: Crime Scene Investigation	Natalie	
2012	Lucky Days	Octavia Nemorian	2 episodes
2013	Castle	Emily	Episode: "The Lives of Others"
2013	Psych	Elin	Episode: "Right Turn or Left for Dead"
2013	How to Live with Your Parents (For the Rest of Your Life)	Francette	Episode: "How to Stand on Your Own Two Feet"
2014	Suburgatory	French Teacher	Episode: "Les Lucioles"
2015	Episodes	Attractive Woman	Episode 1

Awards and achievements
Preceded by (Dominican Republic) Renata Soñé	Miss Universe 2nd Runner-Up; 2006	Succeeded by (Venezuela) Ly Jonaitis
Preceded by Fiona Hefti	Miss Switzerland; 2005	Succeeded by Christa Rigozzi
