= Miss Universo Italia 2005 =

2005 Italian beauty pageant

- Winner: María Teresa Francville

The Miss Universo Italia 2005 pageant was held on April 16, 2005. Only 22 candidates competed for the national crown. The chosen winner represented Italy at the Miss Universe 2005.

== Results ==
- Miss Universo Italia 2005 : María Teresa Francville (Veneto)
