= Miss Turks and Caicos =

Beauty pageant

Miss Turks and Caicos Organization
- Formation: 1980; 46 years ago
- Type: Beauty pageant
- Headquarters: Cockburn Town
- Location: Turks and Caicos Islands
- Members: Miss Universe
- Official language: English
- National director: Gabriela Clesca Vallejo
- Website: www.missuniversetci.com

Miss Turks and Caicos or Miss Universe Turks and Caicos is a national beauty pageant in Turks and Caicos Islands, currently under the ownership of Gabriela Clesca Vallejo.

== History ==
The Miss Turks and Caicos Universe Beauty Organization is owned by Kazz Forbes. The Miss Turks and Caicos Islands Beauty Pageant was first held in 1979. Forbes held a two-year memorandum of understanding with the Turks and Caicos Islands Tourist Board. He did not renew after its tenure.

In 2016, the Miss Turks and Caicos Pageant found new organizers, including Olincia Misick. The pageant, however, did not produce a national or international pageant title for several years.

== Titleholders ==
Year	Miss Turks and Caicos	Notes
1979	Constance Lightbourne	Turks and Caicos Tourist Board Directorship
1980	Francis Rigby	
1981	Jacqueline Astwood	
1982	Lolita Ariza	
1983	Deborah Lindsley	
1984	Miriam Coralita Adams	
1985	Barbara Bulah Mae Capron	
1986	Carmelita Ariza	
1987	Edna Smith	
1988	Sharon Simons	
1989	Karen Been	
1990	Kathy Hawkins	
1991	Barbara Johnson	
1992	Michelle Mills	
1993	Eulease Walkin	
1994	Sharleen Grant	
1995	Delthia Russell	
1996	Keisha Delancy	
1998	Shantel Stubbs	
1999	Clintina Gibbs	
2000	Shireen Gardiner	
2001	Euwonka Selver	
2003	Shamara Ariza	
2004	Weniecka Ewing	
2005	Shavenna Been	
2006	Saneita Been	
2007	Angelica Lightbourne	
2008	Jewel Selver	Jewel Selver withdrew from Miss Universe 2009 on August 22, less than one day before the live telecast
2011	Easher Parker	
2013	Snwazna Adams	Kazz Forbes and Saint George Fashion House (SGFH)
2014	Shanice Williams	Kazz Forbes and Saint George Fashion House (SGFH)
2024	Raynae Myers	Gabriela Vallejo Directorship
2025	Bereniece Dickenson	

== Big Four pageants representatives ==
The Turks and Caicos Islands have been represented in the Big Four international beauty pageants; the four major international beauty pageants for women. These are Miss World, Miss Universe, Miss International and Miss Earth.

=== Miss Universe Turks and Caicos ===
- : Declared as Winner
- : Ended as runner-up or top 5/6 qualification
- : Ended as one of the finalists or semifinalists
- : Ended as special awards winner

The winner of Miss Turks and Caicos represents her country at the Miss Universe. On occasion, when the winner does not qualify (due to age) for either contest, a runner-up is sent.

Year	Miss TCI	Placement at Miss Universe	Special Award(s)
2026	Selena Grant	TBA	
2025	Bereniece Dickenson	Unplaced	
2024	Raynae Myers	Unplaced	
Did not compete between 2015—2023
2014	Shanice Williams	Unplaced	
2013	Snwazna Adams	Unplaced	
2012	Did not compete		
2011	Easher Parker	Unplaced	
2010	Did not compete		
2009	Jewel Selver	Did not compete	
2008	Angelica Lightbourne	Unplaced	
2007	Saneita Been	Unplaced	
2006	Shavenna Been	Unplaced	
2005	Weniecka Ewing	Unplaced	Miss Tourism (Thai Culture award)
2004	Shamara Ariza	Unplaced	
2003	Did not compete		
2002	Euwonka Selver	Did not compete	
2001	Shereen Gardiner	Unplaced	
2000	Clintina Gibbs	Unplaced	
1999	Shantel Stubbs	Unplaced	
1998	Did not compete		
1997	Keisha Delancy	Unplaced	
1996	Delthia Russell	Unplaced	
1995	Sharleen Grant	Unplaced	
1994	Eulease Walkin	Unplaced	
1993	Michelle Mills	Unplaced	
1992	Barbara Johnson	Unplaced	Miss Congeniality
1991	Kathy Hawkins	Unplaced	
1990	Karen Been	Unplaced	
1989	Sharon Simons	Unplaced	Miss Congeniality
1988	Edna Smith	Unplaced	
1987	Carmelita Ariza	Top 10	
1986	Barbara Bulah Mae Capron	Unplaced	
1985	Miriam Coralita Adams	Unplaced	
1984	Deborah Lindsley	Unplaced	
1983	Lolita Ariza	Unplaced	
1982	Jacqueline Astwood	Unplaced	
1981	Francis Rigby	Unplaced	
1980	Constance Lightbourne	Unplaced	

=== Miss International Turks and Caicos ===
- : Declared as Winner
- : Ended as runner-up or top 5/6 qualification
- : Ended as one of the finalists or semifinalists
- : Ended as special awards winner

The winner of Miss International Turks and Caicos represents her country at the Miss International.

Year	Miss International TCI	Placement at Miss International	Special Award(s)
2025	Farrah Grant	Unplaced	Miss International Americas
