= Miss Universe Canada 2005 =

- Date: March 1, 2005
- Venue: Le Casino, Montreal, Quebec
- Broadcaster: Livestream
- Entrants: 33
- Placements: 15
- Winner: Natalie Glebova (Ontario) Toronto

Miss Universe Canada 2005 was the 3rd Miss Universe Canada pageant held on March 1, 2005. The winner represented Canada in the Miss Universe 2005 and won its second crown. The first runner-up represented Canada in Miss International 2005.

== Final results ==
Final results	Contestant	Results
Miss Universe Canada 2005	Natalie Glebova	Miss Universe 2005
1st Runner-up	Gretal Montgomery	
2nd Runner-up	Dalia Rene	
3rd Runner-up	Erika DeVries	
4th Runner-up	Alyson Lozoff	
Top 10	Stacey McKinney; Stephanie Longpre; Tiffany Hynes; Melissa May; Sangeet Dahliwal	
Top 15	Ramona Amiri; Suzanne Davidson; Julia Eldridge; Melissa Jurgutis; Erika Walter	

=== Special awards ===
Award	Contestant
Miss Congeniality	(Quebec) East Canada - Laura de Santis
Miss Photogenic	(Saskatchewan) Saskatoon - Tiffany Williams

== Official Delegates ==
Meet the 33 national delegates that competed for the title of Miss Universe Canada 2005:

Represents	Contestant	Age	Height
Alberta Province	Micaela Smith	19	1.73 m (5 ft 8 in)
British Columbia Province	Petra Ashton	25	1.70 m (5 ft 7 in)
(Alberta) Calgary	Danielle Oscars	26	1.79 m (5 ft 10 in)
(Manitoba) Central Canada	Desiree Alvarado	21	1.71 m (5 ft 7 in)
(Prince Edward Island) Charlottetown	Helena Andrects	20	1.65 m (5 ft 5 in)
(Quebec) East Canada	Laura de Santis	20	1.73 m (5 ft 8 in)
(Alberta) Edmonton	Fernanda Wellington	26	1.69 m (5 ft 7 in)
(New Brunswick) Fredericton	Amanda Fells	21	1.71 m (5 ft 7 in)
Manitoba Province	Levpreet Mihar	26	1.70 m (5 ft 7 in)
(Quebec) Montreal	Ivy Morchtaud	20	1.75 m (5 ft 9 in)
(Ontario) National Capital Region	Gia Washington	24	1.72 m (5 ft 8 in)
New Brunswick Province	Victoria Al Said	19	1.71 m (5 ft 7 in)
(Newfoundland and Labrador) Newfoundland & Labrador Province	Isabella Luís	24	1.65 m (5 ft 5 in)
(Ontario) North Canada	Rachel Li	22	1.73 m (5 ft 8 in)
Northwest Territories	Ashley Martin	26	1.73 m (5 ft 8 in)
Nova Scotia Province	Argellys Palen	26	1.75 m (5 ft 9 in)
Nunavut Territory	Elizabeth Smallfoot	23	1.69 m (5 ft 7 in)
Ontario Province	Indhira Ryan	18	1.84 m (6 ft 0 in)
Prince Edward Island Province	Anna Geo	24	1.70 m (5 ft 7 in)
Quebec Province	Gabriella Benevue	23	1.65 m (5 ft 5 in)
Saskatchewan Province	Stephanie Chin	20	1.74 m (5 ft 9 in)
(Saskatchewan) Saskatoon	Tiffany Williams	25	1.72 m (5 ft 8 in)
(Ontario) South Canada	Mariana Vicente	19	1.70 m (5 ft 7 in)
(Ontario) Southeast Canada	Svetlana Popova	25	1.80 m (5 ft 11 in)
(British Columbia) Southwest Canada	Paola Sebastian	21	1.70 m (5 ft 7 in)
(Ontario) Toronto	Natalie Glebova	23	1.81 m (5 ft 11 in)
(British Columbia) Vancouver	Melissa Coro	18	1.76 m (5 ft 9 in)
(British Columbia) West Canada	Betty Thomas	19	1.88 m (6 ft 2 in)
(Yukon) Whitehorse	Penny Vicks	26	1.74 m (5 ft 9 in)
(Manitoba) Winnipeg	Stephanie di Lione	26	1.66 m (5 ft 5 in)
(Northwest Territories) Yellowknife	Katherine O'Riley	23	1.67 m (5 ft 6 in)
Yukon Territory	Giovanna Patrick	18	1.83 m (6 ft 0 in)
