= Easher Parker =

- Height: 1.68 m (5 ft 6 in)
- Beauty pageant titleholder
- Title: Miss Turks and Caicos 2011
- Hair color: Brown
- Eye color: Brown
- Major competitions: Miss Turks and Caicos 2011 (Winner); Miss Universe 2011 (Unplaced)

Easher Parker is a Turks and Caicos Islander model and beauty pageant titleholder who was crowned Miss Turks and Caicos 2011 on June 8, 2011 at the Regent Palms Hotel in Grace Bay.

She represented Turks and Caicos Islands in the 2011 Miss Universe pageant in São Paulo, Brazil, on September 12, 2011. She was unplaced.

Awards and achievements
Preceded by Jewel Selver	Miss Turks and Caicos; 2011-2012	Succeeded by Snwazna Adams
