= Aida Karina Estrada =

Guatemalan model and beauty pageant titleholder

Aida Karina Estrada Abril de Jaén (born 1986) is a Guatemalan model and beauty pageant titleholder.

Estrada was Miss Teen Guatemala 2004, Miss Guatemala Universe 2005 and International Coffee Queen 2006 and was contestant in the Miss Universe 2005.

She married Juan Pablo Toledo in 2009.

Later, she married Leonardo Jaén in 2013.

== Sources ==
- Girls from Guatemala entry
- article on Estrada's marriage
