= Laura Elizondo =

Mexican beauty pageant titleholder

- Born: Laura Elizondo Erhard; 28 August 1983 (age 43); Tampico, Tamaulipas, Mexico
- Height: 5 ft 8 in (1.73 m)
- Beauty pageant titleholder
- Title: Nuestra Belleza México 2004
- Hair color: Auburn
- Eye color: Brown
- Major competitions: Nuestra Belleza Tamaulipas 2004 (Winner); Nuestra Belleza México 2004 (Winner); Miss Universe 2005 (3rd Runner-up)

Laura Elizondo Erhard (born 28 August 1983 in Tampico) is a Mexican model and beauty pageant titleholder who was crowned Nuestra Belleza México 2004 and represented her country at the Miss Universe 2005 pageant.

== Beauty pageants ==
On 10 September 2004, Elizondo participated in the national beauty pageant Nuestra Belleza México, held in San Luis Potosí. Winning the national crown and becoming the second contestant from the state of Tamaulipas to do so since the pageant first began in 1994, Elizondo obtained the title of Nuestra Belleza México, giving her the right to represent Mexico in the Miss Universe pageant. There she finished as 3rd runner-up to Natalie Glebova of Canada. She also placed 3rd in Best National Costume. Elizondo stated that although she did not win, she was satisfied with the results as well as her accomplishments within the competition.

On 2 September 2005, Elizondo was succeeded by Priscila Perales of the state of Nuevo León as the national titleholder. She graduated on 30 May 2008 from Tecnológico de Monterrey with a Bachelor of Business Administration.

== See also ==
- Dafne Molina
- Natalie Glebova

Awards and achievements
Preceded by (Paraguay) Yanina González	Miss Universe 3rd runner-up 2005	Succeeded by (Paraguay) Lourdes Arévalos
Preceded by Rosalva Luna	Nuestra Belleza México; 2004	Succeeded by Priscila Perales
Preceded by Alejandra Celis	Nuestra Belleza Tamaulipas; 2004	Succeeded by Lorena Ramos
