= Prilly =

- Municipality
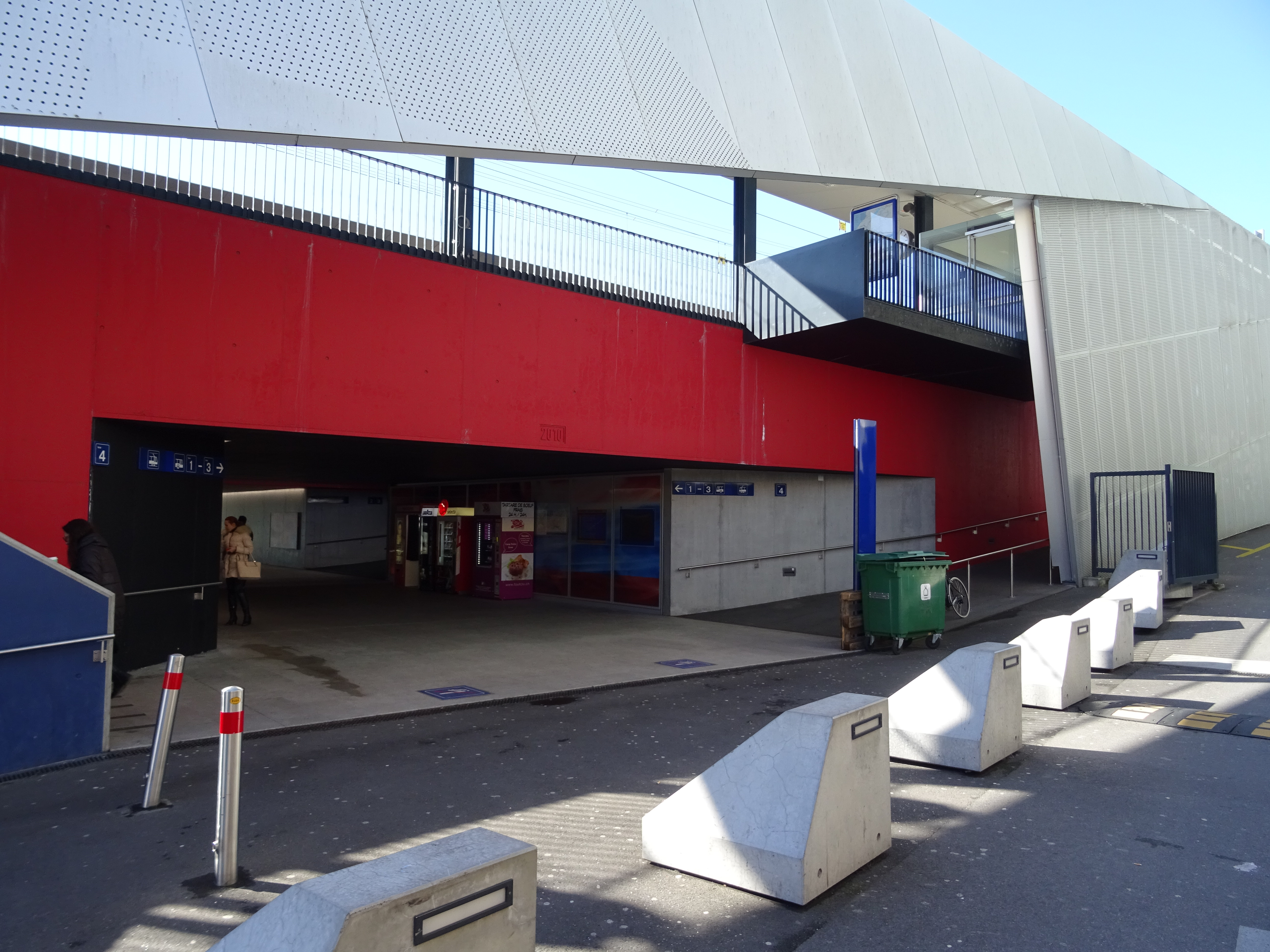
- Prilly-Malley rail station

- Flag Coat of arms
- Location of Prilly
- Location within Switzerland Location within Canton of Vaud
- Coordinates: 46°32′N 6°36′E
- Country: Switzerland
- Canton: Vaud
- District: Ouest Lausannois

Government
  - Mayor: Syndic; Alain Gillièron

Area
  - Total: 2.19 km^{2} (0.85 sq mi)
- Elevation: 481 m (1,578 ft)

Population (December 2006)
  - Total: 10,750
  - Density: 4,910/km^{2} (12,700/sq mi)
- Time zone: UTC+01:00 (CET)
  - Summer (DST): UTC+02:00 (CEST)
- Postal code: 1008
- SFOS number: 5589
- ISO 3166 code: CH-VD
- Surrounded by: Jouxtens-Mézery, Lausanne, Renens, Romanel-sur-Lausanne
- Twin towns: Giubiasco (Switzerland)
- Website: www.prilly.ch

Prilly (French pronunciation: [pʁiji]) is a municipality in Switzerland in the canton of Vaud, located in the district of Ouest Lausannois. It is one of the western suburbs of the city of Lausanne.

== History ==
Prilly is first mentioned around 976-77 as in uilla que uocatur presliacus. By 1185 it was known as Prillie.

== Geography ==
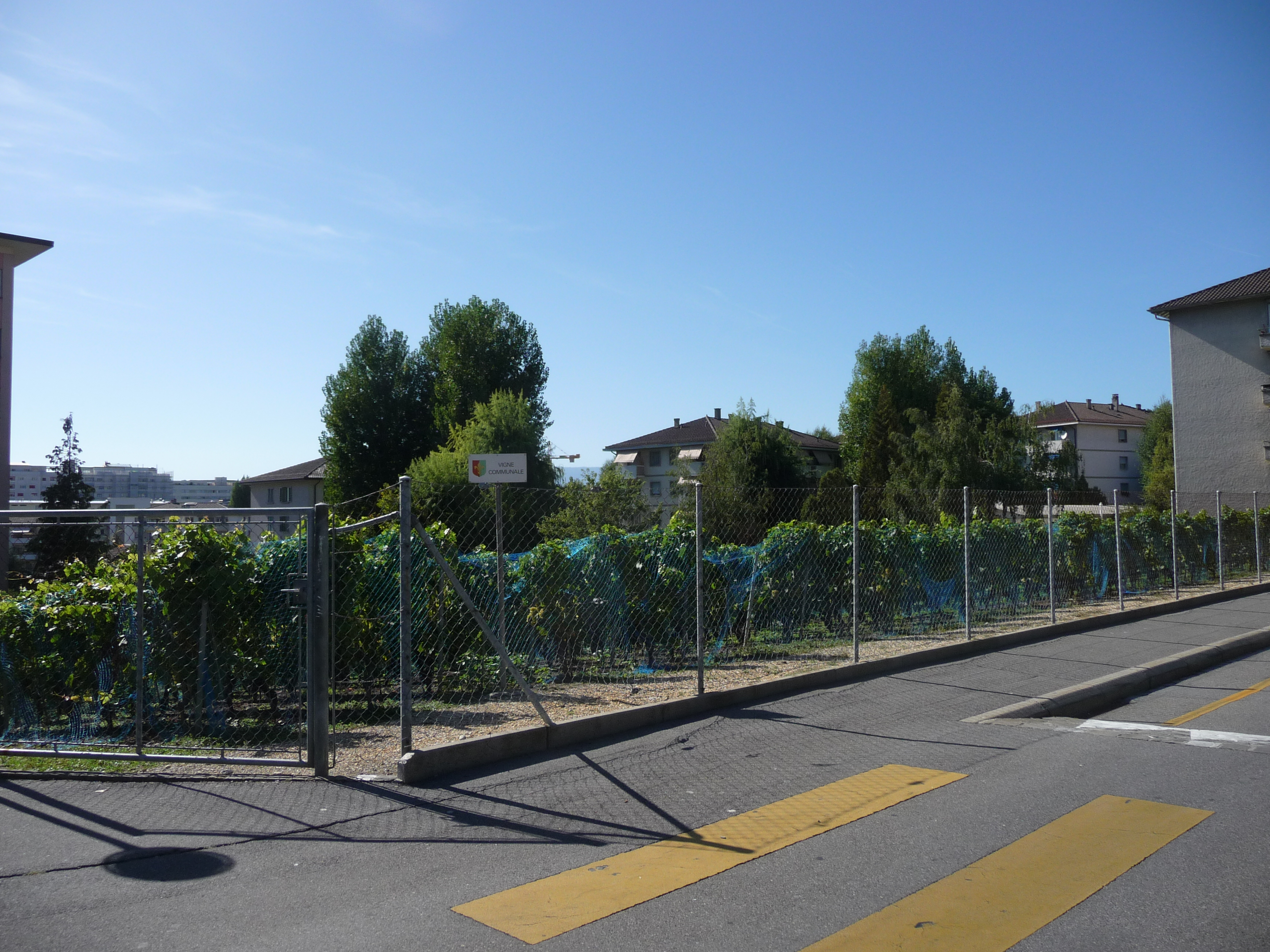
Vineyards in Prilly

Aerial view (1960)

Prilly has an area, as of 2009, of 2.19–2.18 square kilometers (0.85–0.84 mi^{2}) (depending on calculation method). Of this area, 0.24 km^{2} (0.093 mi^{2}) or 11.0% is used for agricultural purposes, while 0.14 km^{2} (0.054 mi^{2}) or 6.4% is forested. Of the rest of the land, 1.8 km^{2} (0.69 mi^{2}) or 82.2% is settled (buildings or roads).

Of the built up area, industrial buildings made up 6.4% of the total area while housing and buildings made up 51.6% and transportation infrastructure made up 15.1%. while parks, green belts and sports fields made up 9.1%. Out of the forested land, all of the forested land area is covered with heavy forests. Of the agricultural land, 7.8% is used for growing crops and 2.7% is pastures.

The municipality was part of the Lausanne District until it was dissolved on 31 August 2006, and Prilly became part of the new district of Ouest Lausannois.

The village of Prilly is developed along the Lausanne-Jougne street and is now part of the agglomeration of Lausanne. It consists of the village of Prilly and the hamlets of Le Chasseur, La Fleur-de-Lys and L'Union, all three of which developed along the Prilly-Neuchâtel road.

== Coat of arms ==
The blazon of the municipal coat of arms is Party gules and vert, a fleur de lys or, overall.

== Demographics ==
Prilly has a population (as of December 2020) of 12,360. As of 2008, 36.9% of the population are resident foreign nationals. Over the last 10 years (1999–2009) the population has changed at a rate of 7.5%. It has changed at a rate of 6.1% due to migration and at a rate of 2.9% due to births and deaths.

Most of the population (as of 2000) speaks French (8,774 or 80.1%), with Italian being second most common (503 or 4.6%) and German being third (364 or 3.3%). There are 6 people who speak Romansh.

Of the population in the municipality 1,716 or about 15.7% were born in Prilly and lived there in 2000. There were 3,455 or 31.5% who were born in the same canton, while 1,738 or 15.9% were born somewhere else in Switzerland, and 3,635 or 33.2% were born outside of Switzerland.

In 2008, there were 67 live births to Swiss citizens and 69 live births to non-Swiss citizens. During the same period, there were 90 deaths among Swiss citizens and 20 deaths among non-Swiss citizens. Ignoring immigration and emigration, the Swiss citizen population decreased by 23, while the non-Swiss population increased by 49. There were 2 Swiss men and 3 Swiss women who emigrated from Switzerland. At the same time, 149 non-Swiss men and 128 non-Swiss women immigrated to Switzerland from another country. Overall, the total Swiss population increased by 38 people in 2008 from all sources, including moves across municipal borders, while the non-Swiss population increased by 194 people. This represented a population growth rate of 2.1%.

The age distribution, as of 2009, in Prilly is; 1,110 children or 9.9% of the population are between 0 and 9 years old and 1,081 teenagers or 9.7% are between 10 and 19. Of the adult population, 1,528 people or 13.6% of the population are between 20 and 29 years old. 1,710 people or 15.3% are between 30 and 39, 1,612 people or 14.4% are between 40 and 49, and 1,239 people or 11.1% are between 50 and 59. The senior population distribution is 1,211 people or 10.8% of the population are between 60 and 69 years old, 991 people or 8.8% are between 70 and 79, there are 619 people or 5.5% who are between 80 and 89, and there are 99 people or 0.9% who are 90 and older.

As of 2000, there were 4,181 people who were single and never married in the municipality. There were 5,160 married individuals, 795 widows or widowers and 819 individuals who are divorced.

As of 2000, there were 5,437 private households in the municipality, and an average of 2.0 persons per household. There were 2,432 households that consist of only one person and 174 households with five or more people. Out of a total of 5,531 households that answered this question, 44.0% were households made up of just one person and there were 20 adults who lived with their parents. Of the rest of the households, there are 1,410 married couples without children, 1,194 married couples with children. There were 279 single parents with a child or children. There were 102 households that were made up of unrelated people and 94 households that were made up of some sort of institution or another collective housing.

In 2000 there were 255 single family homes (or 29.7% of the total) out of a total of 860 inhabited buildings. There were 443 multi-family buildings (51.5%), along with 120 multi-purpose buildings that were mostly used for housing (14.0%) and 42 other use buildings (commercial or industrial) that also had some housing (4.9%). Of the single family homes 26 were built before 1919, while 20 were built between 1990 and 2000. The greatest number of single family homes (97) were built between 1919 and 1945. The most multi-family homes (134) were built between 1946 and 1960 and the next most (96) were built between 1961 and 1970. There were 18 multi-family houses built between 1996 and 2000.

In 2000 there were 6,011 apartments in the municipality. The most common apartment size was 3 rooms of which there were 2,217. There were 572 single room apartments and 467 apartments with five or more rooms. Of these apartments, a total of 5,337 apartments (88.8% of the total) were permanently occupied, while 519 apartments (8.6%) were seasonally occupied and 155 apartments (2.6%) were empty. As of 2009, the construction rate of new housing units was 0.4 new units per 1000 residents. The vacancy rate for the municipality, in 2010, was 0.16%.

The historical population is given in the following chart:

== Politics ==
In the 2007 federal election the most popular party was the SP which received 25.87% of the vote. The next three most popular parties were the SVP (20.75%), the FDP (15.11%) and the Green Party (13.83%). In the federal election, a total of 2,423 votes were cast, and the voter turnout was 41.9%.

== Economy ==
As of 2010, Prilly had an unemployment rate of 5.7%. As of 2008, there were 2 people employed in the primary economic sector and about 1 business involved in this sector. 1,699 people were employed in the secondary sector and there were 62 businesses in this sector. 3,369 people were employed in the tertiary sector, with 258 businesses in this sector. There were 5,276 residents of the municipality who were employed in some capacity, of which females made up 45.2% of the workforce.

In 2008 the total number of full-time equivalent jobs was 4,502. The number of jobs in the primary sector was 2, all of which were in agriculture. The number of jobs in the secondary sector was 1,638 of which 1,269 or (77.5%) were in manufacturing and 369 (22.5%) were in construction. The number of jobs in the tertiary sector was 2,862. In the tertiary sector; 641 or 22.4% were in wholesale or retail sales or the repair of motor vehicles, 41 or 1.4% were in the movement and storage of goods, 127 or 4.4% were in a hotel or restaurant, 89 or 3.1% were in the information industry, 700 or 24.5% were the insurance or financial industry, 259 or 9.0% were technical professionals or scientists, 129 or 4.5% were in education and 639 or 22.3% were in health care.

In 2000, there were 4,664 workers who commuted into the municipality and 4,153 workers who commuted away. The municipality is a net importer of workers, with about 1.1 workers entering the municipality for every one leaving. About 2.9% of the workforce coming into Prilly are coming from outside Switzerland. Of the working population, 32.6% used public transportation to get to work, and 48.6% used a private car.

== Religion ==
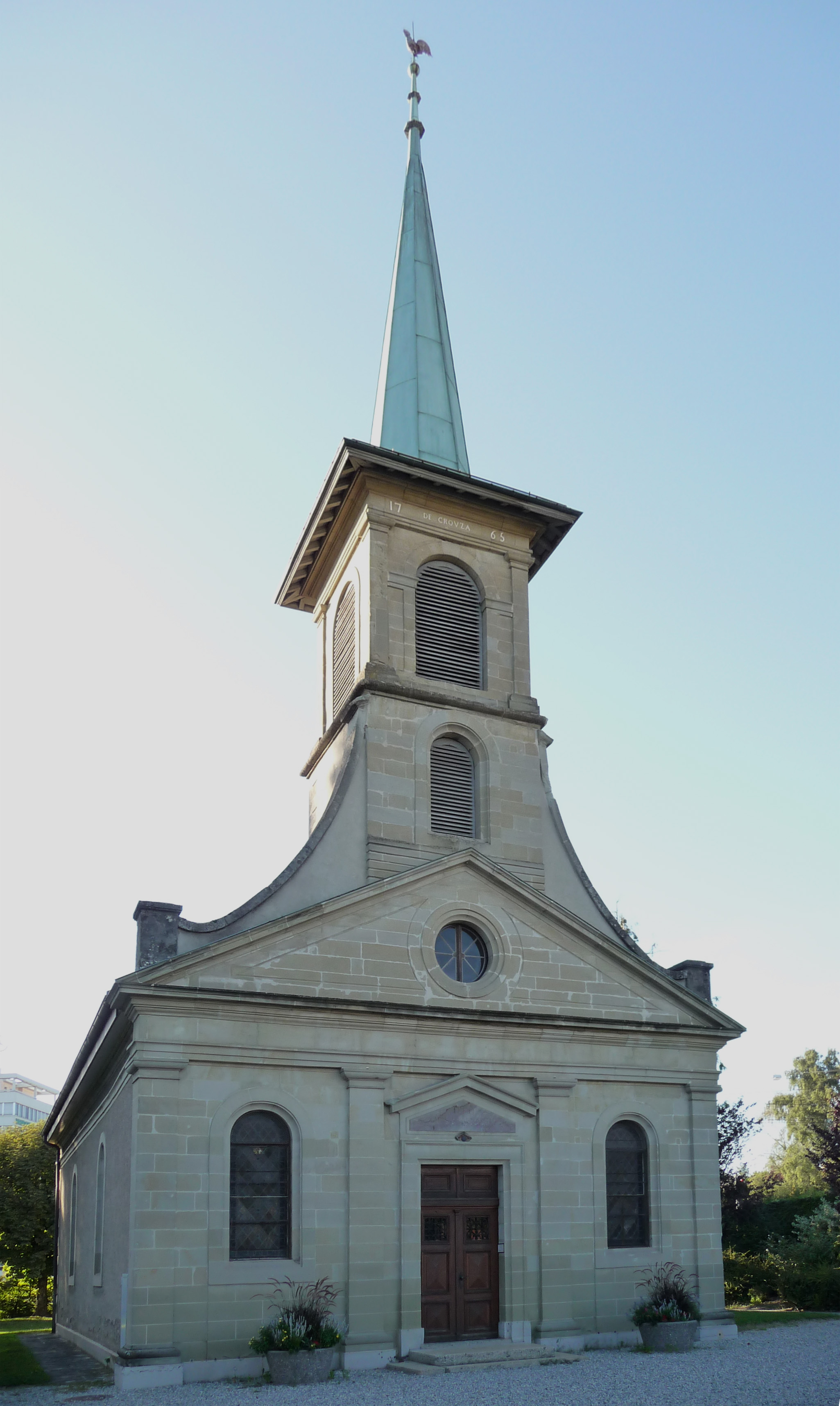
Prilly village church

From the 2000 census, 4,357 or 39.8% were Roman Catholic, while 3,588 or 32.8% belonged to the Swiss Reformed Church. Of the rest of the population, there were 221 members of an Orthodox church (or about 2.02% of the population), there were 9 individuals (or about 0.08% of the population) who belonged to the Christian Catholic Church, and there were 435 individuals (or about 3.97% of the population) who belonged to another Christian church. There were 14 individuals (or about 0.13% of the population) who were Jewish, and 651 (or about 5.94% of the population) who were Islamic. There were 24 individuals who were Buddhist, 65 individuals who were Hindu and 17 individuals who belonged to another church. 1,168 (or about 10.66% of the population) belonged to no church, are agnostic or atheist, and 616 individuals (or about 5.62% of the population) did not answer the question.

== Transport ==
The municipality has four railway stations on two different lines: Prilly-Malley, which is located on the main line between Geneva and Lausanne; and Union-Prilly, Prilly-Chasseur, and Cery-Fleur-de-Lys on the suburban Lausanne–Bercher line. There is also service from the bus and trolleybus lines of Transports publics de la région lausannoise.

== Education ==
In Prilly about 3,982 or (36.3%) of the population have completed non-mandatory upper secondary education, and 1,185 or (10.8%) have completed additional higher education (either university or a Fachhochschule). Of the 1,185 who completed tertiary schooling, 49.5% were Swiss men, 27.3% were Swiss women, 14.5% were non-Swiss men and 8.7% were non-Swiss women.

In the 2009/2010 school year there were a total of 1,165 students in the Prilly school district. In the Vaud cantonal school system, two years of non-obligatory pre-school are provided by the political districts. During the school year, the political district provided pre-school care for a total of 803 children of which 502 children (62.5%) received subsidized pre-school care. The canton's primary school program requires students to attend for four years. There were 654 students in the municipal primary school program. The obligatory lower secondary school program lasts for six years and there were 492 students in those schools. There were also 19 students who were home schooled or attended another non-traditional school.

As of 2000, there were 418 students in Prilly who came from another municipality, while 473 residents attended schools outside the municipality.

Prilly is home to the Communale de Prilly library. The library has (as of 2008) 23,573 books or other media, and loaned out 74,031 items in the same year. It was open a total of 300 days with average of 18 hours per week during that year.

== Notable people ==
- Charles Rist (1874 in Prilly – 1955) a French economist
- Arthur Fonjallaz (1875 in Prilly – 1944) a Swiss military figure, publisher and fascist
- Lauriane Gilliéron (born 1984) a Swiss actress, model and beauty queen, Miss Switzerland 2005 and 2nd runner up Miss Universe 2006; brought up in Prilly

== See also ==
- Hospital of Cery
