= Miss Universe 2005 =

54th Miss Universe pageant

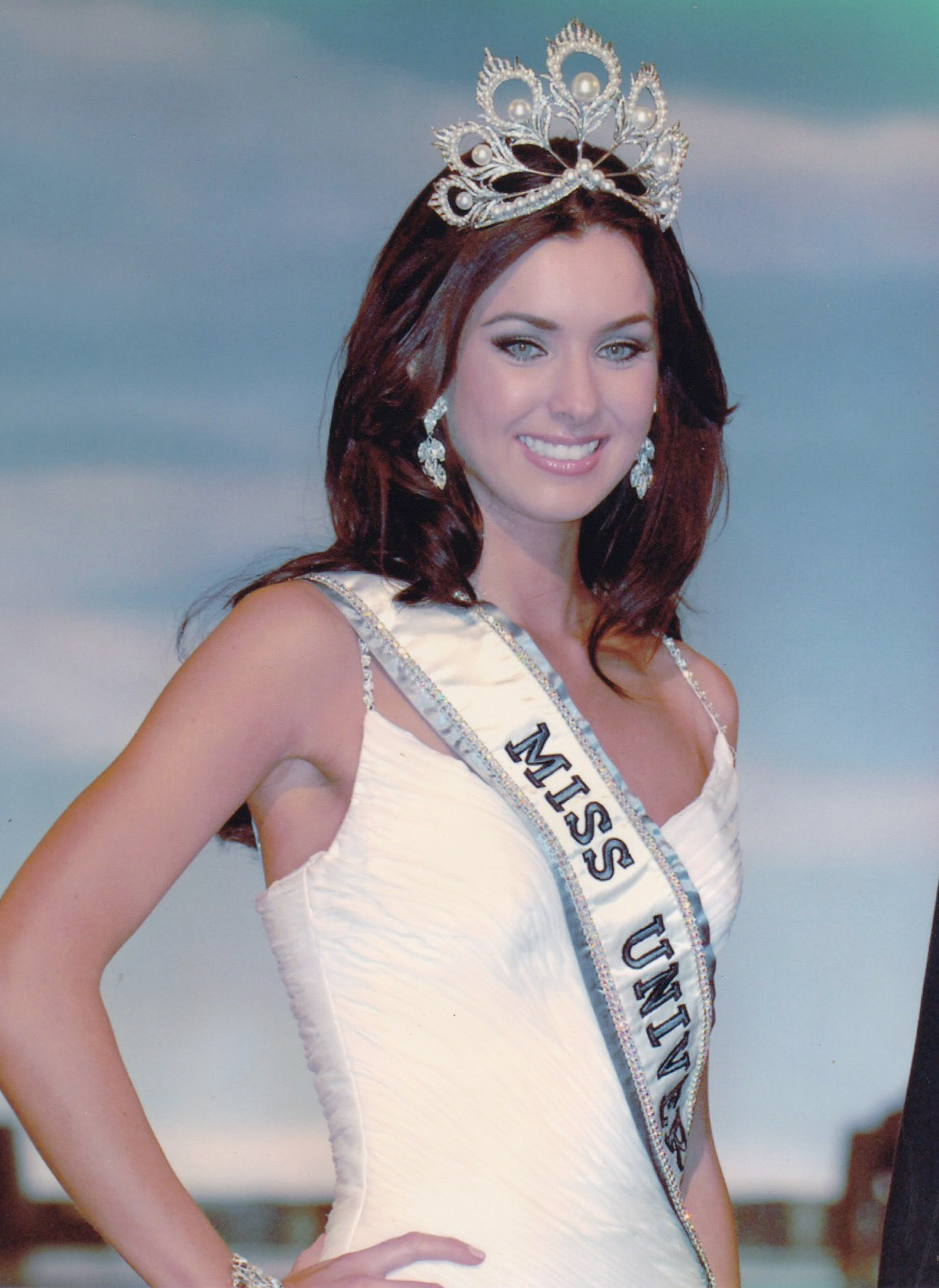
- Natalie Glebova
- Date: 31 May 2005 (Note: The event was held at 07:00 local time (UTC+07:00); for the Americas, this was 30 May in their local times.)
- Presenters: Billy Bush; Nancy O'Dell
- Venue: Impact Arena Hall, Pak Kret, Nonthaburi, Thailand
- Broadcaster: International: NBC; Telemundo; Official broadcaster: Channel 7
- Entrants: 81
- Placements: 15
- Debuts: Latvia
- Withdrawals: Austria; Botswana; Cayman Islands; Chinese Taipei; Estonia; Ghana; Saint Vincent and the Grenadines; Sweden
- Returns: Albania; Indonesia; Mauritius; Namibia; Sri Lanka; United Kingdom; United States Virgin Islands; Zambia
- Winner: Natalie Glebova; Canada
- Congeniality: Tricia Homer; United States Virgin Islands
- Best National Costume: Chananporn Rosjan; Thailand
- Photogenic: Gionna Cabrera; Philippines

Miss Universe 2005 was the 54th Miss Universe pageant, held at the Impact Arena Hall in Pak Kret, Nonthaburi, Thailand, on 31 May 2005.

At the end of the event, Jennifer Hawkins of Australia crowned Natalie Glebova of Canada as Miss Universe 2005. It is Canada's first victory in twenty-three years, and the second victory in the pageant's history.

Contestants from eighty-one countries and territories competed in this year's pageant. The competition was hosted by Billy Bush and Nancy O'Dell.

== Background ==
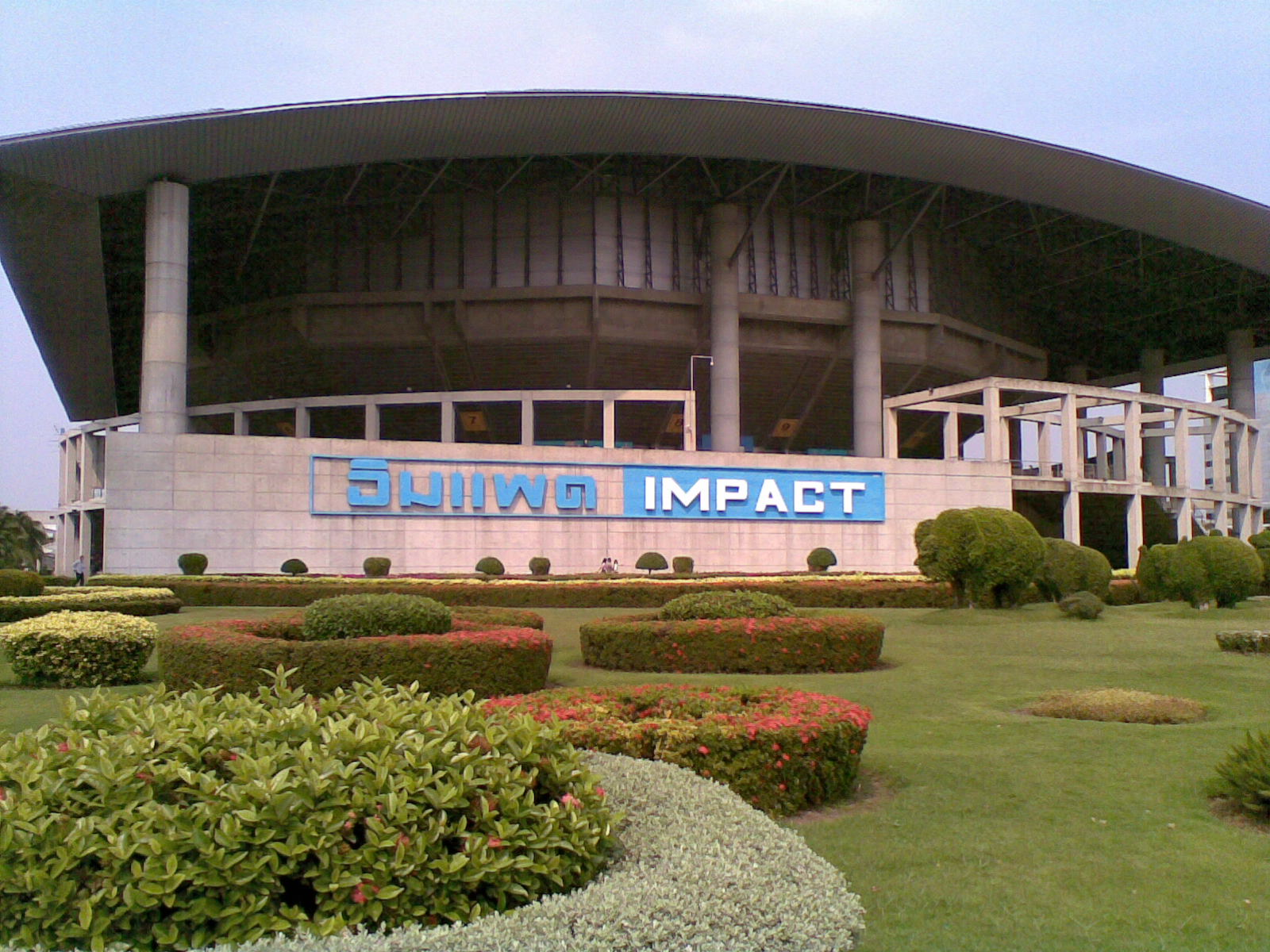
Impact Arena, Nonthaburi province, Thailand, the venue for Miss Universe 2005

=== Location and date ===
Thailand publicized its bid to host the pageant on 10 July 2004, during a visit by Jennifer Hawkins to the country. At the time, Chile, China, and Greece were also being considered to host the event. One month later, it was announced that Thailand had been informally selected to host the competition, at a cost of US$6.5 million. The cost was to be funded by the Thai government in an attempt to boost tourism. In October, the proposal faced difficulties when the Thai government were slow to provide the promised funds, which discouraged prospective sponsors, leading Prime Minister Thaksin Shinawatra to become personally involved to make sure that plans were not derailed. The organization awarded official hosting rights to the Matching Entertainment company in December 2004, after an unsuccessful attempt by a different company, Showcase Thailand 2005.

In February 2005, after the Thai government confirmed plans to back the pageant, the Deputy Prime Minister refuted claims that the event would be held in Khao Lak, a resort town devastated by the 2004 Indian Ocean earthquake and tsunami, but confirmed that Southern Thailand would host events prior to the final competition.

=== Selection of participants ===
Contestants from eighty-one countries and territories were selected to compete in the pageant. Six delegates were appointees to their position to replace the original dethroned winner.

Jana Doleželová, Miss České Republiky 2004, was originally supposed to compete at Miss Universe but did not compete after the Miss České Republiky organization lost the Miss Universe franchise license to the newly formed Česká Miss pageant. Cheryl Ankrah was originally crowned Miss Trinidad and Tobago 2005 but was dethroned after she was accused of not fulfilling her duties and becoming overweight. Although Ankrah initially got an injunction to prevent another pageant being held, a Judge overturned that and a second Miss Trinidad and Tobago pageant was held. The winner of the second pageant, who represented Trinidad and Tobago at Miss Universe, was Magdalene Walcott. Miss Hanoi-Vietnam 2005 Hằng Phạm became Vietnam's representative in this year's competition after Miss Vietnam Photogenic 2004 Diễm Bùi refused to compete because of her studies.

The 2005 edition saw the debut of Latvia, and the returns of Albania, Indonesia, Mauritius, Namibia, Sri Lanka, the United Kingdom, the United States Virgin Islands, and Zambia. Indonesia and Sri Lanka last competed in 1996, Zambia in 1999, the United Kingdom (as Great Britain) in 2000, the United States Virgin Islands in 2002, while the others last competed in 2003. Austria, Botswana, the Cayman Islands, Chinese Taipei, Estonia, Ghana, Saint Vincent and the Grenadines, and Sweden after their respective organizations failed to hold a national competition or appoint a delegate. Marina Rodrigues of Portugal was set to compete at Miss Universe. However, Rodrigues withdrew due to undisclosed reasons.

== Results ==
=== Placements ===
Placement	Contestant
Miss Universe 2005	Canada – Natalie Glebova
1st Runner-Up	Puerto Rico – Cynthia Olavarría
2nd Runner-Up	Dominican Republic – Renata Soñé
3rd Runner-Up	Mexico – Laura Elizondo
4th Runner-Up	Venezuela – Mónica Spear
Top 10	Israel – Elena Ralph; Latvia – Ieva Kokoreviča; Peru – Débora Sulca; Switzerland – Fiona Hefti; United States – Chelsea Cooley
Top 15	Greece – Evangelia Aravani; Indonesia – Artika Sari Devi; Norway – Helene Tråsavik; South Africa – Claudia Henkel; Trinidad and Tobago – Magdalene Walcott

=== Special awards ===
Award	Contestant
Miss Photogenic	Philippines – Gionna Cabrera
Miss Congeniality	United States Virgin Islands – Tricia Homer

==== Best National Costume ====
Result	Contestant
Winner	Thailand – Chananporn Rosjan
1st Runner-up	Czech Republic – Kateřina Smejkalová
2nd Runner-up	Mexico – Laura Elizondo
Top 5	Philippines – Gionna Cabrera; Turks and Caicos Islands – Weniecka Ewing

== Pageant ==
=== Format ===
Same with 2003, fifteen semifinalists were chosen through the preliminary competition— composed of the swimsuit and evening gown competitions and closed-door interviews. The fifteen semifinalists competed in the evening gown and were narrowed down to ten afterward. The ten semifinalists competed in the swimsuit competition and were narrowed down to five afterward. The five finalists competed in the question and answer round and the final look.

=== Selection committee ===
==== Final telecast ====
- Heidi Albertsen – Danish model, winner of Elite Model Look World Final
- Kevin S. Bright – Executive producer of Friends
- Mario Cimarro – Cuban actor
- Bryan Dattilo – Days of Our Lives actor
- Carson Kressley – Queer Eye for the Straight Guy fashion expert
- Cassie Lewis – American Model
- Louis Licari – Celebrity hairstylist
- Anne Martin – from Cover Girl and Max Factor marketing
- Porntip Nakhirunkanok – Miss Universe 1988 from Thailand
- Oleksandra Nikolayenko – Miss Ukraine Universe 2004
- Chutinant Bhirombhakdi – Executive Vice Director, Director of Boon Rawd Brewery
- Jean-Georges Vongerichten – French chef

== Contestants ==
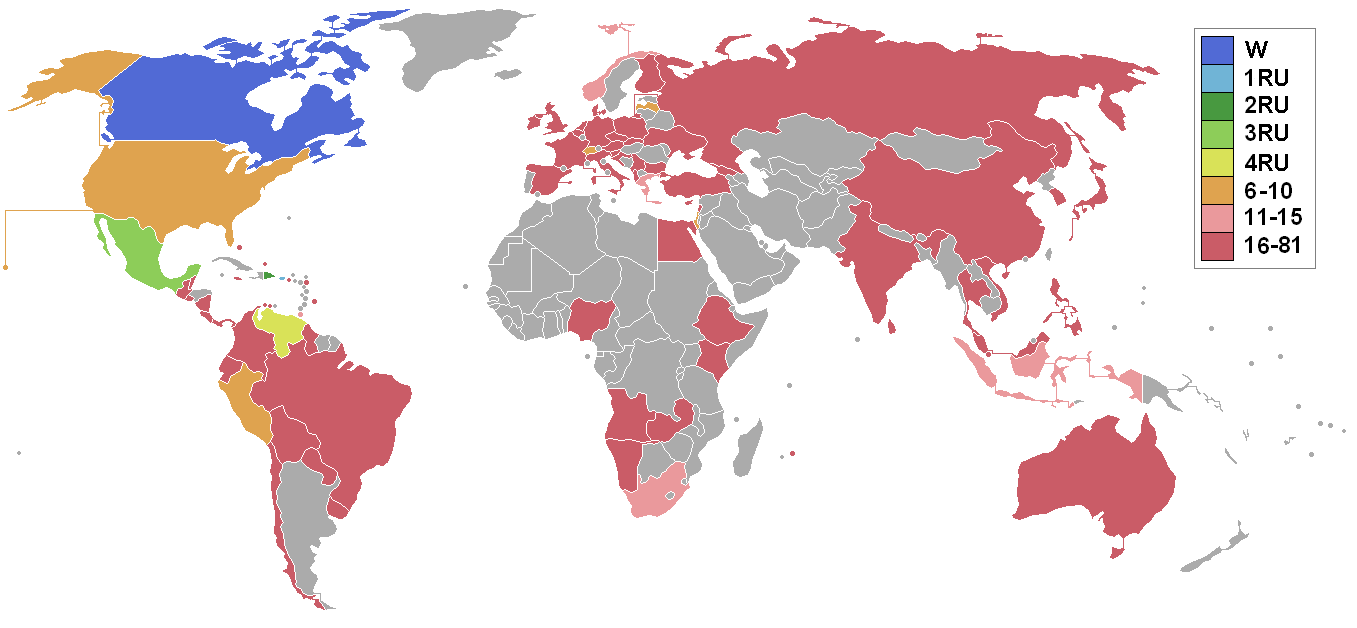
Miss Universe 2005 participating countries and territories

Eighty-one contestants competed for the title.

Country/Territory	Contestant	Age (Note: Ages at the time of the pageant)	Hometown
Albania	Agnesa Vuthaj	19	Istog
Angola	Zenilde Josias	22	Luanda
Antigua and Barbuda	Shermain Jeremy	23	Parham
Aruba	Luisana Cicilia	21	Oranjestad
Australia	Michelle Guy	19	Perth
(The Bahamas) Bahamas	Denia Nixon	19	Nassau
Barbados	Nada Yearwood	21	Saint Michael
Belgium	Debby de Waele	20	Brussels
Belize	Andrea Elrington	22	Belize City
Bolivia	Andrea Abudinen	21	Santa Cruz de la Sierra
Brazil	Carina Beduschi	20	Florianópolis
Bulgaria	Galina Gancheva	19	Varna
Canada	Natalie Glebova	23	Toronto
Chile	Renata Ruiz	21	Santiago
China	Siyuan Tao	21	Chengdu
Colombia	Adriana Tarud	22	Barranquilla
Costa Rica	Johanna Fernández	23	Santa Ana
Croatia	Jelena Glišić	18	Karlovac
Curaçao	Rychacviana Coffie	24	Suffisant
Cyprus	Elena Hadjidemetriou	22	Nicosia
Czech Republic	Kateřina Smejkalová	22	Bohuňovice
Denmark	Gitte Hanspal	23	Copenhagen
Dominican Republic	Renata Soñé	22	Santo Domingo
Ecuador	Ximena Zamora	20	Quito
Egypt	Meriam George	18	Cairo
El Salvador	Irma Dimas	18	San Salvador
Ethiopia	Atetegeb Tesfaye	23	Addis Ababa
Finland	Hanna Ek	21	Ilola
France	Cindy Fabre	19	Falaise
(Georgia (country)) Georgia	Rusudan Bochoidze	21	Tbilisi
Germany	Aslı Bayram	24	Darmstadt
Greece	Evangelia Aravani	19	Lefkada
Guatemala	Aida Karina Estrada	19	Guatemala City
Guyana	Candisie Franklin	24	Linden
Hungary	Szandra Proksa	23	Siófok
India	Amrita Thapar	23	Pune
Indonesia	Artika Sari Devi	25	Pangkal Pinang
(Republic of Ireland) Ireland	Mary Gormley	21	Dublin
Israel	Elena Ralph	21	Ramat Gan
Italy	Maria Teresa Francville	18	Veneto
Jamaica	Raquel Wright	23	Kingston
Japan	Yukari Kuzuya	21	Ichinomiya
Kenya	Rachel Marete	19	Nairobi
Latvia	Ieva Kokoreviča	19	Limbaži
Lebanon	Nadine Njeim	21	Beirut
Malaysia	Angela Gan	23	Tawau
Mauritius	Magalie Antoo	23	Port Louis
Mexico	Laura Elizondo	21	Tampico
Namibia	Adele Basson	24	Khomas
Netherlands	Sharita Sopacua	22	Utrecht
Nicaragua	Daniela Clerk	23	Managua
Nigeria	Roseline Amusu	21	Lagos
Norway	Helene Tråsavik	18	Rogaland
Panama	Rosa María Hernández	22	Los Santos
Paraguay	Karina Buttner	23	Asunción
Peru	Débora Sulca	19	Cajamarca
Philippines	Gionna Cabrera	22	Pasig
Poland	Marta Kossakowska	20	Bydgoszcz
Puerto Rico	Cynthia Olavarría	23	San Juan
Russia	Natalia Nikolaeva	18	Rostov
Serbia and Montenegro	Jelena Mandić	26	Belgrade
Singapore	Cheryl Tay	24	Singapore
Slovakia	Michaela Drencková	19	Bratislava
Slovenia	Dalila Dragojevič	20	Vrhnika
South Africa	Claudia Henkel	22	Pretoria
South Korea	So-young Kim	24	Seoul
Spain	Verónica Hidalgo	23	Gerona
Sri Lanka	Rozanne Diasz	26	Gampaha
Switzerland	Fiona Hefti	25	Zürich
Thailand	Chananporn Rosjan	23	Bangkok
Trinidad and Tobago	Magdalene Walcott	22	Tunapuna–Piarco
Turkey	Dilek Aksoy	21	İzmir
Turks and Caicos Islands	Weniecka Ewing	18	Blue Hills
Ukraine	Juliya Chernyshova	18	Kyiv
United Kingdom	Brooke Johnston	26	London
United States	Chelsea Cooley	21	Charlotte
United States Virgin Islands	Tricia Homer	23	Saint Thomas
Uruguay	Viviana Arena	22	Salto
Venezuela	Mónica Spear	20	Maracaibo
Vietnam	Hằng Phạm	20	Hanoi
Zambia	Cynthia Kanema	24	Kabwe
