= Weniecka Ewing =

Miss Turks & Caicos Universe 2004

Weniecka Ewing is a Turks and Caicos Islander fashion model and beauty pageant titleholder.

== Information ==
A native of Blue Hills, Providenciales, Ewing's family members and friends suggested a modeling career. Ewing first won the 2004 Miss Turks and Caicos contest. Winning this contest qualified her to compete in the 2025 Miss Universe competition in Thailand. While in Bangkok, Ewing won Thailand's Ministry of Tourism and Sports Award during the national costume competition. At 5'3", Ewing was the shortest delegate in the contest and could not beat the overwhelming odds in the highly competitive final. Canada's Natalie Glebova won the title. Ewing, who had just graduated high school when those beauty contests took place, was hoping to later become a Business Admiral in the Turks and Caicos Islands.
