= Bohuňovice (Svitavy District) =

- Municipality
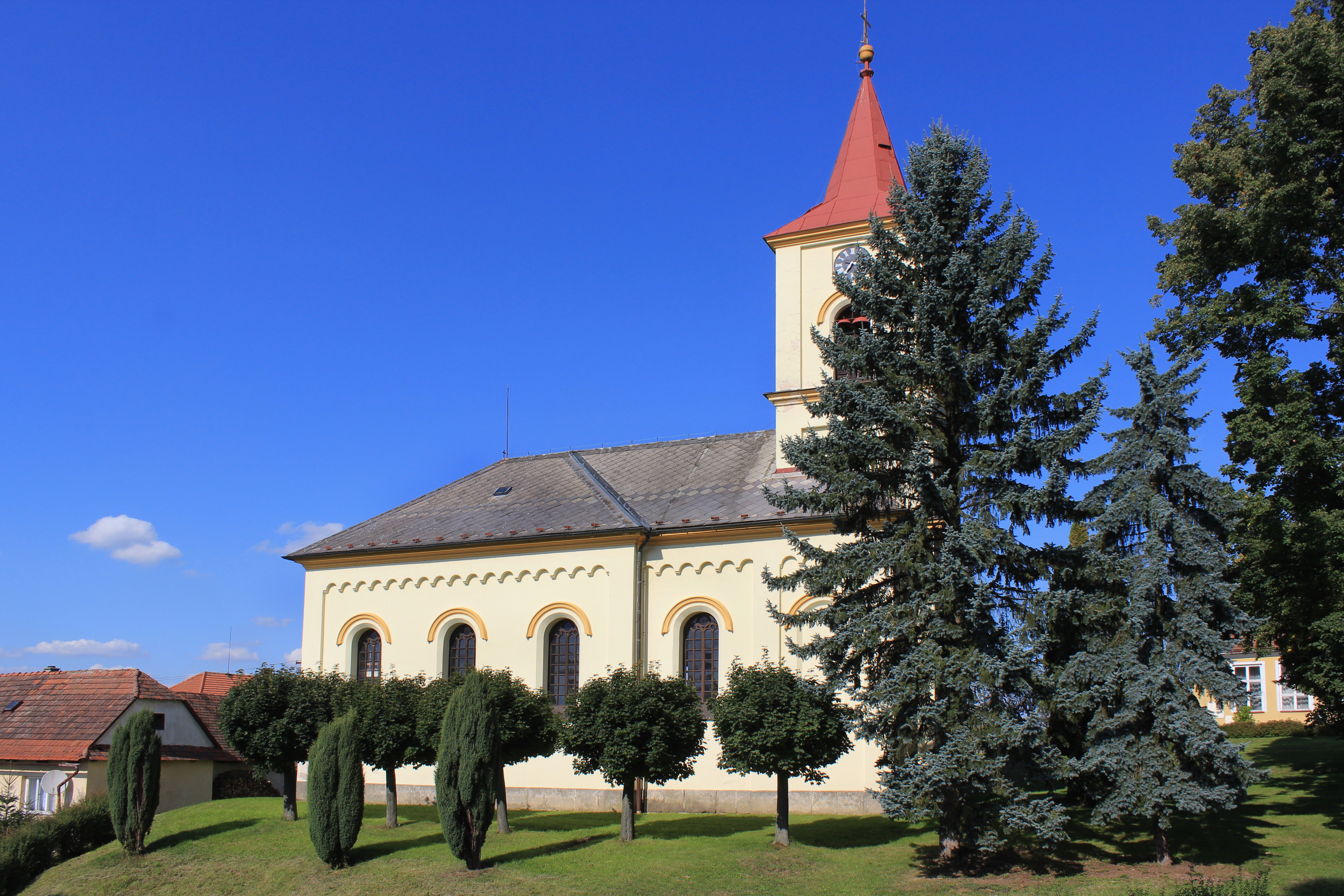
- Church of Saint Procopius

- Location in the Czech Republic
- Coordinates: 49°54′29″N 16°15′46″E
- Country: Czech Republic
- Region: Pardubice
- District: Svitavy
- First mentioned: 1167

Area
  - Total: 4.23 km^{2} (1.63 sq mi)
- Elevation: 335 m (1,099 ft)

Population (2026-01-01)
  - Total: 114
  - Density: 27.0/km^{2} (69.8/sq mi)
- Time zone: UTC+1 (CET)
  - Summer (DST): UTC+2 (CEST)
- Postal code: 570 01
- Website: www.bohunovice.net

Bohuňovice is a municipality and village in Svitavy District in the Pardubice Region of the Czech Republic. It has about 100 inhabitants.

Bohuňovice lies approximately 23 kilometres (14 mi) north-west of Svitavy, 38 km (24 mi) south-east of Pardubice, and 133 km (83 mi) east of Prague.

== Demographics ==
Historical population
Year	Pop.	±%
1869	354	—
1880	344	−2.8%
1890	318	−7.6%
1900	327	+2.8%
1910	314	−4.0%
1921	300	−4.5%
1930	269	−10.3%
1950	185	−31.2%
1961	174	−5.9%
1970	152	−12.6%
1980	148	−2.6%
1991	125	−15.5%
2001	116	−7.2%
2011	113	−2.6%
2021	111	−1.8%
Source: Censuses
