= Fiona Hefti =

Swiss model (born 1980)

Fiona Hefti (born 4 May 1980 in Zürich, Switzerland) is a Swiss model and beauty pageant titleholder who was crowned Miss Switzerland 2004 and represented her country at Miss World 2004 and Miss Universe 2005 pageants. She went on to compete in Miss World 2004 where she was unplaced. She also competed in Miss Universe 2005 and finished in the top 10. She was the 9th Swiss to placed in the semifinalists.

In 2007 she married Christian Wolfensberger. They are the parents of three children.

== Sources ==
- article on Hefti
- article on Hefti
- article on Hefti
