= Bohuňovice (Olomouc District) =

- Municipality
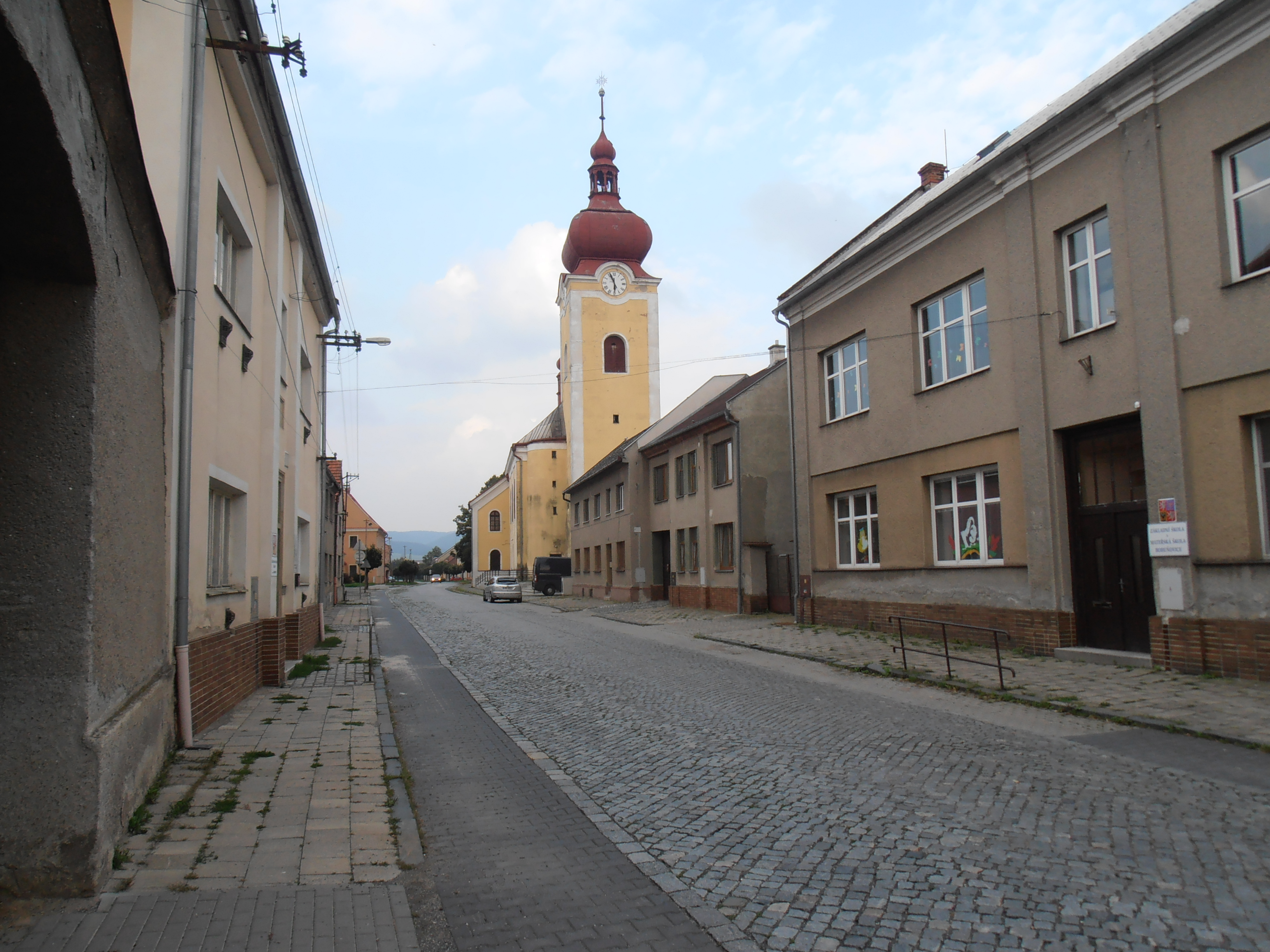
- Centre with the Church of Saint John the Baptist

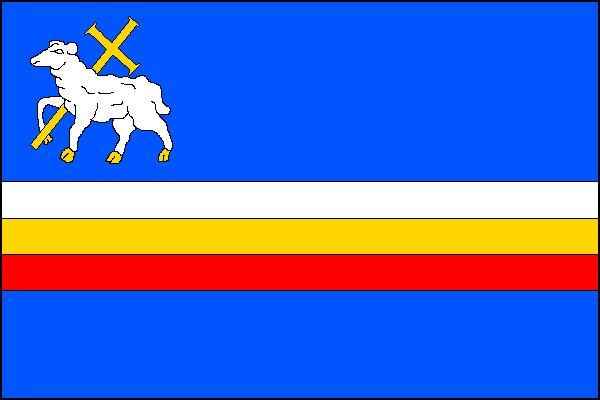
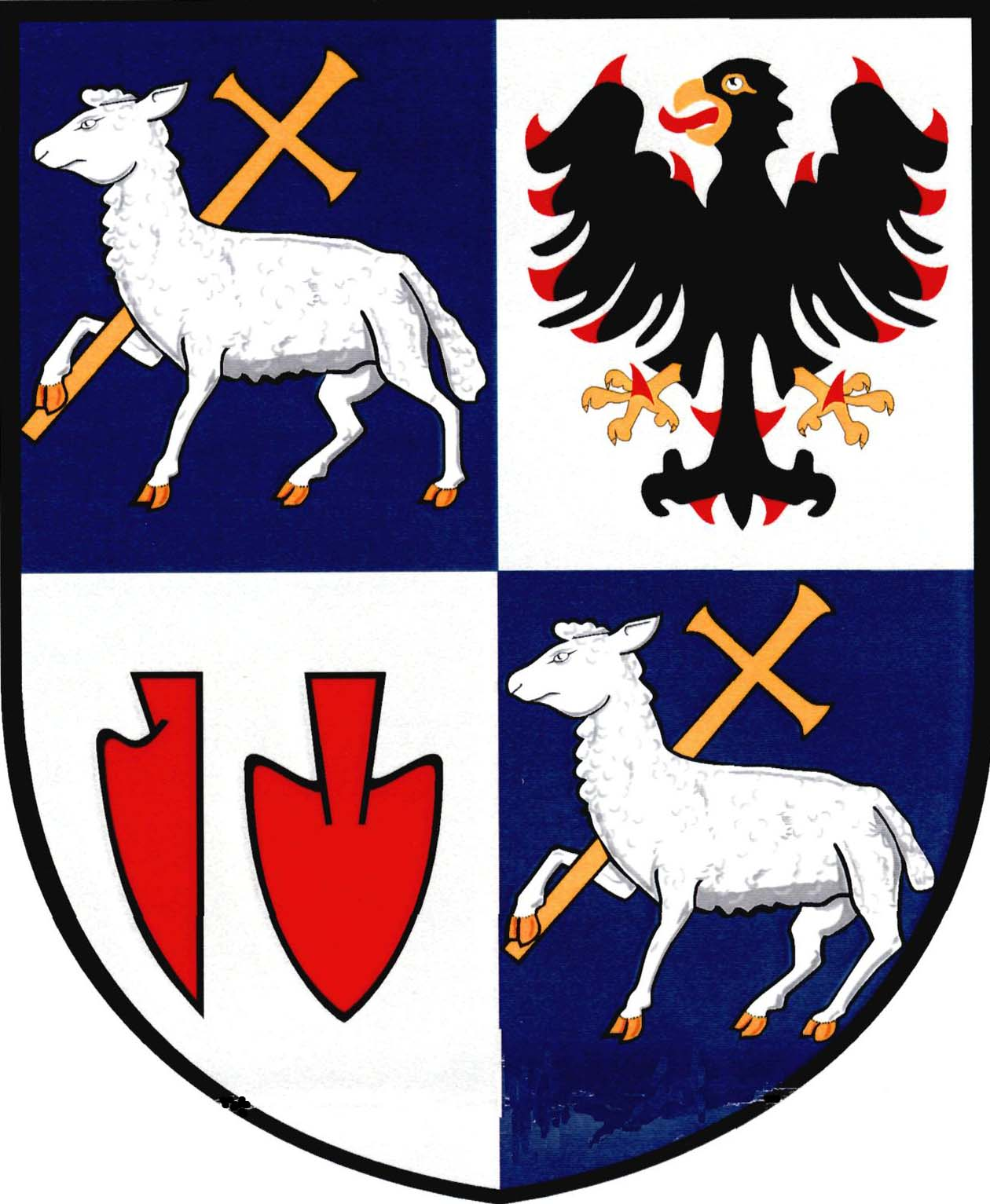
- Flag Coat of arms

- Location in the Czech Republic
- Coordinates: 49°39′47″N 17°17′13″E
- Country: Czech Republic
- Region: Olomouc
- District: Olomouc
- First mentioned: 1078

Area
  - Total: 12.57 km^{2} (4.85 sq mi)
- Elevation: 231 m (758 ft)

Population (2026-01-01)
  - Total: 2,486
  - Density: 197.8/km^{2} (512.2/sq mi)
- Time zone: UTC+1 (CET)
  - Summer (DST): UTC+2 (CEST)
- Postal code: 783 14
- Website: www.bohunovice.cz

Bohuňovice is a municipality and village in Olomouc District in the Olomouc Region of the Czech Republic. It has about 2,500 inhabitants.

== Geography ==
Bohuňovice is located about 8 kilometres (5 mi) north of Olomouc. It lies in a flat agricultural landscape in the Upper Morava Valley. The stream Trusovický potok flows through the municipality.

== History ==
The first written mention of Bohuňovice is from 1078, when it was property of the newly established Hradisko Monastery. Bohuňovice was owned by the monastery until the abolishment of the monastery in 1784. In 1864–1867, the railway was built. In 1960, Trusovice and Moravská Loděnice were joined to Bohuňovice. Today they form one integral municipality.

== Demographics ==
Historical population

Year	Pop.	±%
1869	1,297	—
1880	1,343	+3.5%
1890	1,351	+0.6%
1900	1,390	+2.9%
1910	1,628	+17.1%

Year	Pop.	±%
1921	1,786	+9.7%
1930	2,008	+12.4%
1950	1,870	−6.9%
1961	2,031	+8.6%
1970	2,021	−0.5%

Year	Pop.	±%
1980	2,144	+6.1%
1991	2,199	+2.6%
2001	2,363	+7.5%
2011	2,507	+6.1%
2021	2,383	−4.9%

Source: Censuses

== Transport ==
The I/46 road (heading from Olomouc to Opava and the Czech–Polish border) runs along the eastern municipal border.

Bohuňovice is located on the railway line Šumperk–Vyškov via Olomouc.

== Sights ==
The main landmark of Bohuňovice is the Church of Saint John the Baptist. It was built in the Baroque style in the second quarter of the 18th century, but its core and the tower probably date from the 17th century.
