= Natalie Glebova =

Canadian beauty pageant titleholder

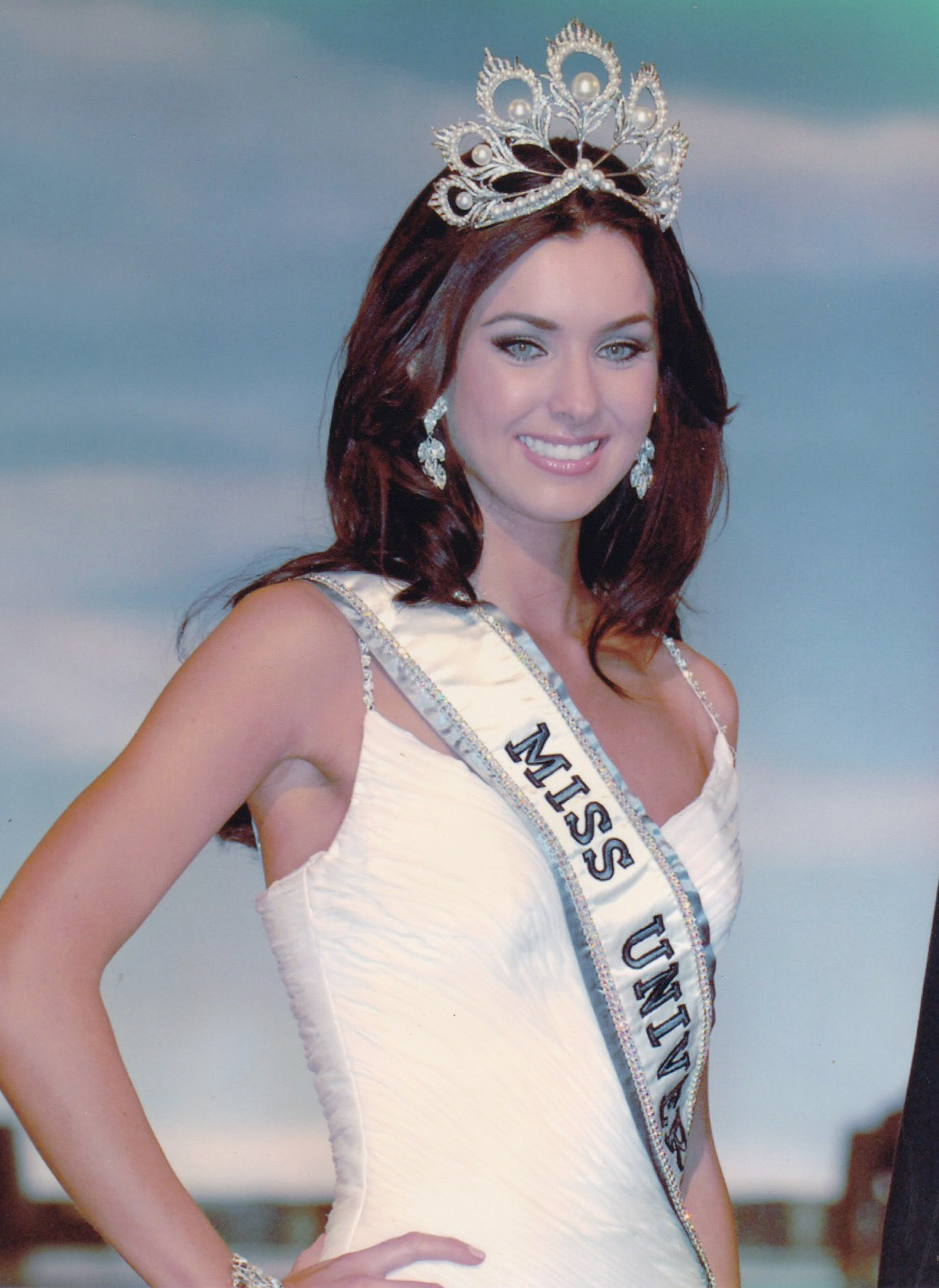
- Glebova as the 54th Miss Universe
- Born: Natalya Vladimirovna Glebova; 11 November 1981 (age 45); Tuapse, Russian SFSR, Soviet Union
- Citizenship: Canadian
- Education: Toronto Metropolitan University (BComm)
- Height: 1.80 m (5 ft 11 in)
- Spouse: Paradorn Srichaphan (m. 2007; div. 2011)
- Children: 1
- Beauty pageant titleholder
- Title: Miss Universe Canada 2005; Miss Universe 2005
- Hair color: Brown
- Eye color: Blue
- Major competitions: Miss Universe Canada 2004; (3rd Runner-Up); Miss Universe Canada 2005; (Winner); Miss Universe 2005; (Winner)

Natalie Glebova (Russian: Наталья Глебова; born Natalya Vladimirovna Glebova; (Note: This name uses Eastern Slavic naming customs; the patronymic is Vladimirovna and the family name is Glebova. Russian: Наталья Владимировна Глебова) 11 November 1981) is a Canadian author and beauty queen who won Miss Universe 2005. She had previously won the Miss Universe Canada 2005 title.

== Early life and education ==
Glebova was born in Tuapse, Russia, to Vladimir Slezin and Anna Glebova. While in Russia, Vladimir worked as a radio communications specialist in the merchant marine industry, while Anna was a high school teacher. Glebova is an only child. As a child, Glebova studied classical piano and competed in rhythmic gymnastics. At age 13, Glebova and her family left Russia for Canada and settled in Toronto, Ontario. After arriving in Canada, her parents found employment as software specialists.

After graduating from high school (central, in London Ontario), Glebova worked as a professional model in Toronto and received a Bachelor of Commerce in information technology management and marketing from Toronto Metropolitan University. Prior to competing in pageantry, Glebova worked as a motivational speaker for elementary and high school students.

== Career ==
=== Pageantry ===
==== Miss Universe Canada ====
Glebova's first pageant was Miss Universe Canada 2004, where she was the third runner-up behind eventual winner Venessa Fisher. Glebova returned the following year and won Miss Universe Canada 2005.

==== Miss Universe ====
As Miss Universe Canada 2005, represented Canada and won Miss Universe 2005, held in Bangkok, Thailand. Throughout the contest, Glebova gave the traditional Thai greeting known as a "Wai" on every appearance which helped her win over Thai audiences and judges. Glebova was crowned Miss Universe 2005 by the outgoing titleholder, Jennifer Hawkins of Australia. Glebova's win was Canada's second after Karen Dianne Baldwin had won Miss Universe 1982, and made Glebova the first immigrant to win Miss Universe.

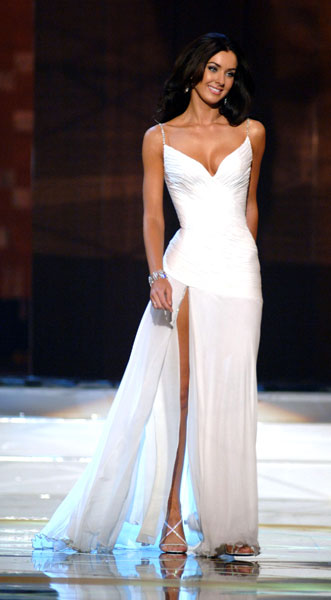
Glebova during the Miss Universe evening gown competition

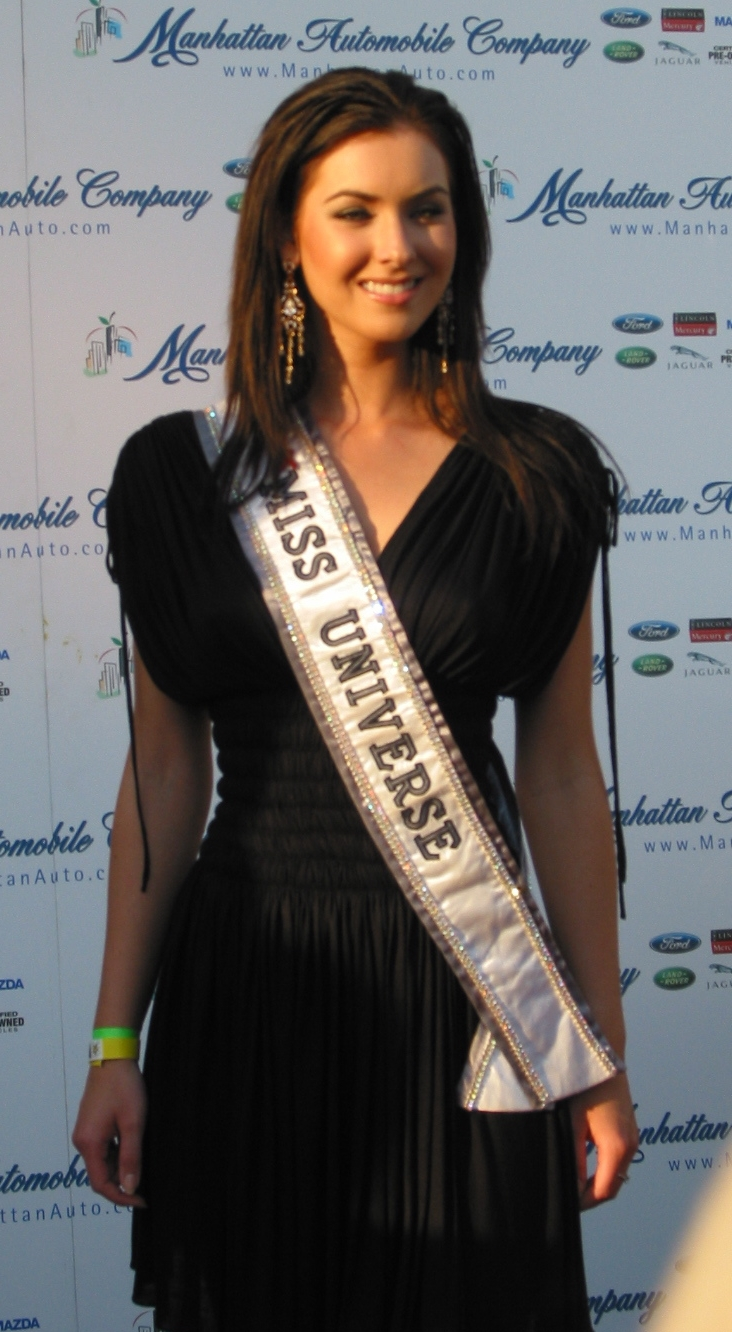
Glebova in 2005

As Miss Universe, Glebova traveled extensively and promoted a program to increase awareness of HIV and AIDS, the ongoing platform of the Miss Universe titleholder. She attended the G8 Summit in New York City on 11 August 2005, which looked at ending poverty in underdeveloped regions, and ending gang activity and drug cartels in Colombia. In November, Glebova attended the Hindustan Times Leadership Summit in Delhi, India, and a week-long tour of Indian cities on the AIDS Awareness Program. In December, she attended the national pageants of Puerto Rico and the Dominican Republic before going back to Thailand to commemorate the one-year anniversary of the 2004 tsunami tragedy.

During Glebova's official homecoming to her hometown of Toronto, she was offered an official apology by the city's mayor David Miller after she was barred from attending a "Tastes of Thailand" festival while wearing her sash and tiara and being introduced as a beauty titleholder. A 1990 bylaw, which prevents sexual stereotyping of women in public events, was strictly enforced and largely criticized by Miller and Miss Universe Organization president Paula Shugart. Shugart called the episode an "insult" to not only Glebova, but to the Thai government who named her an "honorary tourism ambassador". According to Shugart, this was the first time that a titleholder was uninvited from a public event.

During her reign, Glebova traveled to Africa in July to attend an AIDS Educational Tour with the Global Health Council, Malaysia in late September, the Bahamas and St. Martin. In late March 2006, Glebova visited Russia for the first time since leaving the country as a child. She participated in an HIV-AIDS awareness campaign in Moscow and attended a Russian fashion show as a special guest. She also made numerous trips to Thailand, where she commemorated the anniversary of the 2004 tsunami, and Canada, her home nation.

She also attended the national pageants of Ukraine in mid-October, Puerto Rico in November, Dominican Republic in December, Czech Republic in February, Thailand and Nicaragua in March, and Brazil in April. She also crowned Alice Panikian as her Miss Universe Canada successor the night of 21 March 2006. Alice finished 6th in Miss Universe.

Glebova was supposed to travel to Indonesia to crown Miss Indonesia Universe 2006 in late July, but because of Canada's travel ban to the Southeast Asian country, Glebova was officially replaced with Puerto Rico's Cynthia Olavarria, the first runner-up of Miss Universe 2005. Since the Miss Indonesia pageant's revival in 2000, this was the first time that Miss Universe was unable to attend the coronation.

On 23 July 2006 Glebova crowned Zuleyka Rivera of Puerto Rico as her successor in Los Angeles.

=== Post-pageantry ===
After finishing her reign as Miss Universe, Glebova continued appearing as a brand ambassador and in public roles. In May 2006, it was announced that Glebova, along with golfer Vijay Singh and pro tennis player Paradorn Srichaphan, would become a brand ambassador for Thailand-based beer brewers Singha Corp. owners of Boon Rawd Brewery. Glebova completed her one-year contract with Singha in July 2007.

In 2008, Glebova joined The Amazing Race Asia 3 and was partnered with Pailin Rungratanasunthorn. They represented Thailand and came in eighth place.

In December 2012, it was announced that Glebova would compete in reality TV show Dancing with the Stars Thailand. The first episode was aired on Channel 7 (Thailand) on 8 January 2013, at 10:30 pm.

In May 2012, Glebova and French company Bel Perfumes based in Thailand released Glebova's first fragrance, Beauty Icon.

Glebova also serves as an ambassador for Soi Dog Foundation, a non-profit organization aiding homeless street animals in Thailand.

In June 2015, Glebova became an Ambassador for Year of the Gibbon for the IUCN SSC Primate Specialist Group - Section on Small Apes, to raise awareness for gibbon conservation. Glebova has a passion for wildlife conservation and recently launched a public awareness campaign about the impact of photo-prop tourism on gibbons Year of the Gibbon.

In 2018, Glebova partnered with a California attorney and entrepreneur Dr. Patama Mokaves Dumas to begin a program for high schools and universities called Empowered. The program's aim is to develop confidence and positive thinking of young people so they can happily achieve their life goals. They have been teaching a course titled “Empowered YOU” at Bangkok University since 2018.

== Personal life ==
In 2006, Glebova began dating Thai professional tennis player Paradorn Srichaphan, whom she met at the 2006 Thailand Open. They became engaged the following year, and married later in 2007 in Bangkok. The couple split up in early 2011 and divorced later in the year.

== Published work ==
- February 2007, Healthy Happy Beautiful.
- November 2018, I Am Winning - A Guide to Personal Empowerment available on Amazon and in Asia Books Thailand.
- May 2025, Temple of Love - A Pilgrimage to the Heart available on Amazon.

== Notes ==
Awards and achievements
Preceded by (Australia) Jennifer Hawkins	Miss Universe; 2005	Succeeded by (Puerto Rico) Zuleyka Rivera
Preceded by Vanessa Fisher	Miss Universe Canada; 2005	Succeeded by Alice Panikian
