= List of MBGN Titles =

Most Beautiful Girl in Nigeria—also abbreviated as MBGN—is a pageant organised by Silverbird Group with the main purpose of sending representatives to international competitions.

== Titleholders ==
Until 2007, only MBGN winners were sent abroad to represent the country at International level. The pageant has since been revamped to produce several more representatives, with the most consistent being MBGN World, MBGN Universe, and MBGN Tourism. The following is a list of all MBGN titleholders since 2007.

Year	MBGN World	MBGN Universe	Tourism	MBGN ECOWAS	MBGN Ambassador
2018	Anita Ukah; Imo	Aramide Lopez; Lagos	Daniella Jatto; Edo		
2017	Ugochi Ihezue; Kebbi	Stephanie Agbasi; Lagos	Winfrey Okolo; Plateau		
2016	Debbie Collins; Ebonyi	Unoaku Anyadike; Anambra			
2015	Unoaku Anyadike; Anambra	Debbie Collins; Ebonyi	Chizoba Ejike; Abuja	Chikaodili Nna-Udosen; Bauchi	Cynthia Sapara; Edo
2014	Iheoma Nnadi; Akwa Ibom	Queen Celestine; Edo	Chinyere Adogu; Kwara	Endurance Akpoyiba; Osun	Princess Dennar; Abuja
2013	Anna Banner; Bayelsa	Stephanie Okwu; Imo	Powede Lawrence; Adamawa	Enoma Agboniko; Kaduna	Melissa Devidal; Abuja
2012	Damiete Charles-Granville ^{[c]} River	Isabella Ayuk ^{[d]} Cross River	Ifeoma Umeokeke; Abuja	Okafor Nkechinyere; Osun	Joyce Chidebe; Kaduna
2011	Sylvia Nduka; Taraba	Sophie Gemal; Bayelsa	Obioma Isiwu; Enugu	Grace Ndam; Lagos	Jennifer Igwegbe; Gombe
2010	Fiona Aforma Amuzie; Plateau	Ngozi Odaloni; Niger	Nengi Warikoko; Rivers	Chinenye Obiora; Ekiti	Lynda Dunkwu; Gombe
2009	Glory Chukwu; Nasarawa	Sandra Otohwo; Delta	Diana Odiaka ^{[b]} Lagos	Joy Ngozika Obasi ^{[a]} Rivers	Ugochi Ogugbue; Imo
2008	Adaeze Igwe; Anambra	Stephanie Oforka; Taraba	Ure Obowu; Enugu	Uchechi Ejiogu; Nasarawa	Sandra Idugboe; Edo
2007	Munachi Nwankwo; Imo	Ebinabo Potts-Johnson; Bayelsa	Sakana Dikko; Plateau	Erica Ekundaye; Edo	Anire Afejuku; Ogun

- ^{a} Joy Ngozika Obasi won Miss ECOWAS 2009 in Port Harcourt, Nigeria.
- ^{b} Diana Odiaka placed Top 20 Miss Tourism Queen International 2009 and awarded Continental Queen Africa in Zhangzhou, China.
- ^{c} Damiete competed at the Miss World 2012 in Sanya China.. She previously named as the winner of MBGN Universe.
- ^{d} Isabella has been replaced by MBGN Universe 2012, Damiete Charles-Granville. According to Silverbird Group’s Vice President Guy Murray Bruce, Isabella will not participate in the Miss World 2012 competition due to “personal reasons”. Isabella competed at the Miss Universe 2012 in Las Vegas, USA.

=== Miss Universe Nigeria ===
Color key

- Declared as Winner
- Ended as runner-up
- Ended as one of the finalists or semifinalists

Year	State	MBGN	Placement	Special Awards
2018	Lagos	Aramide Lopez	Unplaced	
2017	Lagos	Stephanie Agbasi	Unplaced	
2016	Anambra	Unoaku Anyadike	Unplaced	
2015	Ebonyi	Debbie Collins	Unplaced	
2014	Edo	Queen Celestine	Unplaced	Miss Congeniality
2013	Imo	Stephanie Okwu	Unplaced	
2012	Cross River	Isabella Ayuk	Unplaced	
2011	Bayelsa	Sophie Gemal	Unplaced	Best National Costume (Top 10)
2010	Niger	Ngozi Odaloni	Unplaced	
2009	Delta	Sandra Otohwo	Unplaced	
2008	Taraba	Stephanie Oforka	Unplaced	
2007	Bayelsa	Ebinabo Potts-Johnson	Unplaced	
2006	Edo State	Vanessa Agun	Unplaced	
2005	Lagos	Roseline Amusu	Unplaced	
2004	Benin City	Anita Uwagbale	Unplaced	
2003	Cross River	Celia Bissong	Unplaced	
2002	Anambra	Chinenye Ochuba	Unplaced	
2001	Rivers	Agbani Darego	Top 10	
2000	Rivers	Matilda Kerry	Unplaced	
1999	Imo	Angela Ukpoma	Unplaced	
1998	Imo	Chika Chikezie	Unplaced	
1995	Kogi	Toyin Raji	Unplaced	Miss Congeniality
1994	Benue	Susan Hart	Unplaced	
1993	Lagos	Rihole Gbinigie	Unplaced	
1992	Akwa Ibom	Sandra Petgrave	Unplaced	
1991	Lagos	Tonia Okogbenin	Unplaced	
1990	Niger	Sabina Umeh	Unplaced	
1989	Abuja	Bianca Onoh	Unplaced	
1988	Warri	Omasan Buwa	Unplaced	
1987	Imo	Lynda Chuba-Ikpeazu	Unplaced	

=== Miss World Nigeria ===
Color key

- Declared as Winner
- Ended as runner-up
- Ended as one of the finalists or semifinalists

Year	State	MBGN	Placement	Special Awards
2018	Imo	Anita Ukah	Top 30	
2017	Kebbi	Ugochi Ihezue	Top 15	Miss World Top Model
2016	Ebonyi	Debbie Collins	Unplaced	
2015	Anambra	Unoaku Anyadike	Unplaced	
2014	Akwa Ibom	Iheoma Nnadi	Unplaced	
2013	Bayelsa	Anna Banner	Unplaced	
2012	Rivers	Damiete Granville	Top 30	
2011	Taraba	Sylvia Nduka	Unplaced	
2010	Plateau	Fiona Aforma Amuzie	Unplaced	
2009	Nasarawa	Glory Chukwu	Unplaced	
2008	Anambra	Adaeze Igwe	Unplaced	
2007	Imo	Munachi Nwankwo	Unplaced	
2006	Lagos	Abiola Bashorun	Unplaced	
2005	Kwara	Omowunmi Akinnifesi	Unplaced	
2004	Benin City	Anita Uwagbale	Top 15	Miss World Africa
2003	Cross River	Celia Bissong	Unplaced	
2002	Anambra	Chinenye Ochuba	Top 10	Miss World Africa
2001	Rivers	Agbani Darego	Miss World 2001	Miss World Africa
2000	Rivers	Matilda Kerry	Unplaced	
1999	Imo	Angela Ukpoma	Unplaced	
1998	Imo	Chika Chikezie	Unplaced	
1996	Lagos	Emma Komlosy	Unplaced	
1994	Benue	Susan Hart	Unplaced	
1993	Lagos	Rihole Gbinigie	Unplaced	
1992	Akwa Ibom	Sandra Petgrave	Unplaced	
1991	Rivers	Nike Oshinowo	Unplaced	
1990	Niger	Sabina Umeh	Unplaced	
1989	Abuja	Bianca Onoh	Unplaced	
1988	Warri	Omasan Buwa	Unplaced	
1987		Ngazi Bienoseh	Top 15	
