= Maryam Elisha =

Nigerian model and fashion designer

- Born: Kano, Nigeria
- Education: University of Lagos
- Occupation: Fashion designer
- Years active: 2002–present
- Title: Miss Valentine, Miss Environment, Pageant Couturier of the Year, Fashion Designer of the Year

Maryam Elisha (born Maryam Rikoto Elisha) is a Nigerian model, beauty queen, and fashion designer. She founded the Rikaoto by ME fashion brand in 2009, two years after being crowned Miss Valentine. Elisha was named one of the 20 most influential pageant personalities in Nigeria.

== Personal life and education ==
Elisha is from Kebbi state but was born in Kano state to a now retired police officer father and a businesswoman mother. She is the youngest of seven children. She had her primary and secondary school education in Kano state before relocating to Lagos state to study English Language at the University of Lagos. After graduating from the university, she proceeded to the New Jersey Fashion School, in the United States, where she trained for eight months in fashion designing.

In March 2017, Elisha had a close call with death.

== Career ==
=== Modeling ===
Elisha was scouted by an agent while in secondary school and eventually worked as a model for close to eight years. As a model, she was the maiden face of Faruz drink. She also modeled for other top brands including Delta Soap, Sterling Bank, MTN Nigeria, Lucozade Boost and Diamond Bank.

=== Pageantry ===
While studying English Language at the University of Lagos, Elisha entered and won the Miss Valentine Beauty Pageant, 2007. In 2008, she collaborated with another pageant winner, Damilola Otunbanjo, Sisi Oge of Lagos, to advocate for good health care and campaign against stigmatization of people living with HIV/AIDS. This advocacy brought Elisha the Miss Environment title, by the Lagos State Waste Management Authority, and recognition by the former governor of Lagos state, Babatunde Fashola.

Elisha was a contestant in Miss Nigeria 2010, but was eliminated during the pageant's reality show Miss Nigeria: The Making of a Queen after pageant CEO Nike Oshinowo insisted she already lived a content life which did not require the crown. Elisha returned to the competition in 2013 after Oshinowo sold the franchise, but did not win.

=== Rikaoto By ME ===
The brand was founded in 2009 and makes red carpet and evening dresses. Several pageant contestants and winners in local and international competitions have donned designs by Rikaoto By ME. In 2014, due to the association of the Most Beautiful Girl in Nigeria (MBGN) 2013, Anna Ebiere Banner with the Rikaoto brand, Elisha worked as fashion consultant to MBGN 2014. In 2015, Elisha and her fashion brand received public attention due to the success of pageant contestants she clothed and the awards they won. In a 2016 interview with Encomium Magazine, Elisha disclosed about 14 beauty queens emerged wearing her design. In another 2016 interview with The Punch newspaper, Elisha said that: “the Most Beautiful Girl in Nigeria 2015, Unoaku Anyadike, emerged the top five during the modeling competition at Miss World 2015. Also, Miss Tourism Nigeria 2014, Collete Nwadike, was the first black woman to win the Exquisite Face of the Universe in 2015. She also won the best outfit at the pageant.” (Note: See Unoaku Anyadike and Collete Nwadike) Elisha also added bridal outfits to the Rikaoto by ME collections. The brand has exhibited at several fashion shows like the New York Fashion Week, Miami Fashion Week, Washington based DC Fashion Week, Paris Fashion Week, Mercedes Fashion Week, and The African Fashion Week Nigeria.

=== Works and recognition ===
Rikaoto By Me was one of the fashion houses commissioned to make clothes for the ex-president of Nigeria, Goodluck Jonathan.

Elisha serves as a judge on pageant shows.

She was named Pageant Couturier of the Year at the 2016 Xperience Womanity Awards, held in Enugu state in April. In 2017, she won two awards, Pageant Designer of the Year and Pageant Couturier of the Year, at the Xperience Womanity Awards.

The Lagos state government under the administration of governor Akinwunmi Ambode added Elisha as one of the success stories of the state, in its celebration of the state's 50th anniversary.
