= Olutosin Araromi =

Nigerian-American model

- Born: Olutosin Itohan Araromi; May 6, 1994 (age 32); New Jersey, United States
- Education: Montclair State University
- Height: 1.77 m (5 ft 10 in)
- Beauty pageant titleholder
- Title: MBGN Universe 2019
- Hair color: Black
- Eye color: Brown
- Major competitions: Most Beautiful Girl in Nigeria 2019 (Winner – MBGN Universe 2019); Miss Universe 2019 (Top 20)

Olutosin Araromi (born May 6, 1994) is a Nigerian-American model and beauty pageant titleholder who was crowned MBGN Universe 2019, and represented Nigeria at Miss Universe that same year.

== Personal life ==
She was born and raised in New Jersey, United States, she holds a bachelor's degree in Health and Human Services from Montclair State University. After her pageant career ended, she branched off to the Real Estate Industry. She currently works primarily in NYC.

== Pageantry ==
Olutosin started her career in 2015 when she won the Miss Nigeria USA pageantry.

=== Most Beautiful Girl In Nigeria ===
She won the Most Beautiful Girl In Nigeria Universe 2019, the event was held in 11 October at the Gabriel Okara Cultural Centre Yenegoa, Bayelsa. she represented Taraba state.

=== Miss Universe ===
Olutosin represented Nigeria at the 68th Miss Universe pageant, which was held on December 8, 2019, at Tyler Perry Studios in Atlanta, Georgia where she placed in the top 20.

Awards and achievements
Preceded by Aramide Lopez	Most Beautiful Girl in Nigeria Universe; 2019	Incumbent
