= Sabina Umeh-Akamune =

Nigerian singer (born 1969)

Sabina Umeh
- Born: Sabina Ifeoma Umeh
- Beauty pageant titleholder
- Title: MBGN 1990
- Major competition: Most Beautiful Girl in Nigeria 1990

Sabina Umeh-Akamune (born Sabina Ifeoma Umeh, 1969) is a Nigerian singer/songwriter, model and beauty pageant titleholder.

== Early life ==
The daughter of renowned writer and professor Charles Umeh, Umeh attended Federal Government Girls College, Bida, where her classmates included Rita Anuku, Miss Nigeria 1986. As a Theatre Arts student at the University of Benin, she specialised in statecraft and costume design, and won her campus pageant, Miss UniBen.

== Pageantry ==
Umeh-Akamune was crowned Most Beautiful Girl in Nigeria 1990 in December 1989, and would participate in Miss Universe, Miss Intercontinental, and Miss World, winning the Miss Personality award at the latter. Umeh vowed to avoid scandals but found herself embroiled in one when journalists questioned her victory, her boyfriend (now husband) Kesse Jabari, was revealed to be an employee of organisers Silverbird Productions. Umeh discredited the allegations, stating she had contested earlier in 1987 when Jabari was already with Silverbird, but lost to Omasan Buwa.

== Career ==
Since ending her reign, Theatre Arts graduate Umeh has carved a career in music, television/film, modelling, and beauty, and has worked in public relations for cosmetic brand IKB. A specialist in dance, choreography and acting, Umeh was co-founder and artistic director of music production company Juicygroove which promoted aspiring talent.. In 2013, she released a promotional CD which was a preview of her debut album "Warrior", with an international tour starting in Nigeria.

The Sabina brand is currently being managed and marketed in partnership with three of the top entertainment management teams in the United States.

== Education ==
Umeh-Akamune has a degree in Theatre Art from the University of Benin, and was conferred with an honorary Doctor of Philosophy Humane Letters, from Trinity International University of Ambassadors USA.

== Personal life ==
Umeh-Akamune has been married to fashion designer and actor Kesse Jabari, who she first met in the University of Benin where they were both students, for over 30 years; the couple have four children together.

Preceded by Regina Askia Usoro	MBGN; 1990	Succeeded by Adenike Oshinowo
