= Umunna =

Umunna is a surname. Notable people with the surname include:

- Chuka Umunna (born 1978), British politician
- Glory Umunna, Nigerian beauty pageant winner

== See also ==
- Umunna (Igbo term)
