= Imaobong =

Origin
- Language: Ibibio
- Origin: Nigeria
- Meaning: God's love
- Region of origin: South-south Nigeria

Other names
- Derivatives: Ima, Ima-ima

AudioImaobong is a Nigerian feminine given name of Ibibio origin which means "God's love".

== Notable people with the given name ==
- Imaobong Regina Askia Usoro (born 1967), Nigerian-born, American-based actress, model and former beauty queen
- Imaobong Nse Uko (born 2004), Nigerian sprinter
