= Adekunle Akinlade =

Nigerian politician (b. 1969)

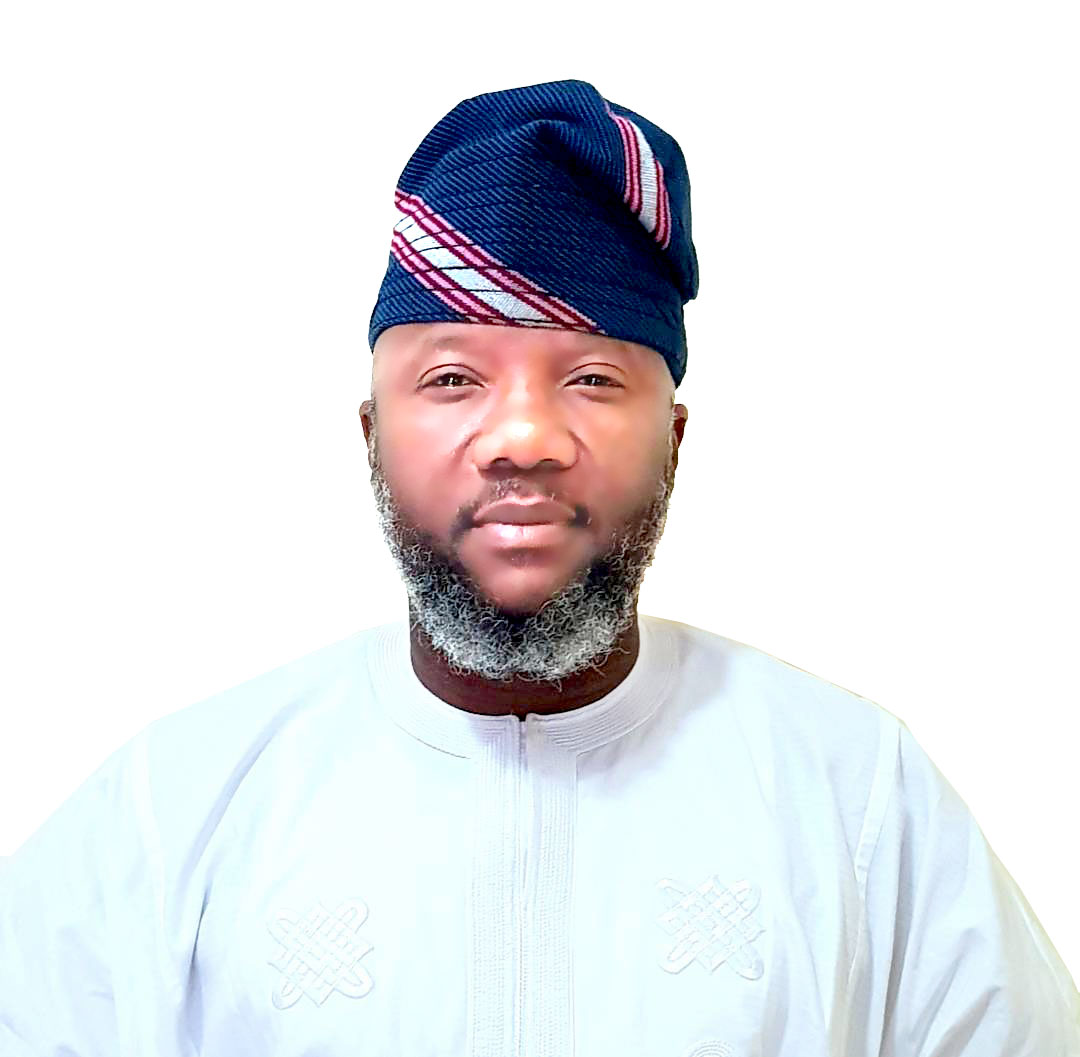
- Born: 9 October 1969 (age 57); Ipokia, Ogun State, Nigeria
- Occupation: Politician
- Spouse: Chinenye Ochuba-Akinlade (2008)

Adekunle Abdulkabir Akinlade Triple A (born 9 October 1969) is a Nigerian politician. He represented Egbado South and Ipokia federal constituency in the House of Representatives. He left the All Progressive Congress and joined the Allied Peoples Movement to run for Governor of Ogun State in the 2019 election.

== Early life ==
Akinlade was born in Ipadilpopo Compound at Agosasa, Ipokia Local Government Area of Ogun State. He spent his early years travelling across the country with his father.

== Education ==
Akinlade attended Children House School and St. Anne's Primary School in Ibara, Abeokuta, before completing his primary education at Army Children Primary School in Akure, Ondo State. He attended Emmanuel Comprehensive High School, Ilaro, and later Yewa High School, Ajilete, where he obtained the West African School Certificate (WASC) in 1988. He later studied at the College of Preliminary Studies, Yola, before earning a bachelor's degree in Political Science from Lagos State University in 1995. After graduating, he completed the National Youth Service Corps (NYSC).

== Politics ==
He was appointed Senior Special Assistant on Taxation and Revenue in July 2011. In this capacity, he oversaw the state Directorate of other Taxes at the Board of Internal Revenue Services (IRS). He joined the All Progressive Congress in the 2015 general elections to represent Egbado south and Ipokia at the federal house of representatives. He defected to the Allied Peoples Movement to run in the 2019 governorship election, after failing to secure the APC nomination, which he lost to Dapo Abiodun.

== Personal life ==
Akinlade married Chinenye Ochuba, a former Most Beautiful Girl in Nigeria and Miss World Nigerian representative, in 2008.
