= Listed Miss Grand International 2022's national representative selection =

Miss Grand International 2022's national preliminary pageants

The 10th-anniversary edition of the Miss Grand International pageant was held at the Sentul International Convention Center in West Java, Indonesia on October 25, 2022, in which candidates from 68 countries and territories participated. These candidates were elected as the country representatives through different methods, such as through the Miss Grand National which was held to select the country representative for Miss Grand International specifically, or appointed by another national pageant organizer, in which the main winner was sent to compete on other international stages. Some of them were assigned as the representatives without competing at any national pageant in this particular year.

== Overview ==
MGI 2022 Participants classified by selection methods:
1. A1: Miss Grand National pageant winners: 23 (33.8%)
2. A2: Other 2023 national pageant main winners: 6 (8.82%)
3. B1: Won Miss Grand as supplemental title: 5 (7.35%)
4. B2: Appointed from other 2022 pageants: 1 (1.47%)
5. C1: Casting/audition: 1 (1.47%)
6. C2: Appointed, no event held: 32 (47.1%)

As per data collected in the National preliminary contest section, 39 national pageant was held to elect the country representatives for Miss Grand International 2022. Twenty-three of which was the Miss Grand National pageants (A1). Seven was other national contests that sent their main winners to Miss Grand International 2023 (A2). Eight national contests listed the Miss Grand title as one of the supplement awards (B1). One pageant, Miss Bolivia, later appointed its runner-up as Miss Grand National titleholder (B2). All the remaining candidates were either determined through the casting or appointed without participating in any respective national pageants (C1 and C2), such as the representative of Mexico.

The representatives of Cameroon, the Democratic Republic of Congo, and Kazakhstan, who were appointed to the title, as well as the Kyrgyzstan candidate, who obtained the title from the national contest, did not enter the international tournament and no replacements were assigned. Meanwhile, the representative of Kosovo withdrew during the international pageant boot camp due to health issues.

Seven candidates were assigned as the replacements for the original ones, including:

- Belgium: Alyssa Gilliaert, Miss Grand Belgium 2022 winner, was replaced by the finalist, Chiara Vanderveeren, due to health issues.
- Bolivia: Camila Sanabria, who had been elected Miss Supranational Bolivia 2023 in the Miss Bolivia 2022 pageant, was appointed Miss Grand Bolivia 2022 as a consequence of the Alondra Mercado's renouncement; Alondra has previously announced Miss Grand Bolivia 2022 on the stage of the Miss Bolivia 2022 pageant.
- Cuba: Daniela Hernández, who obtained the title from the Miss y Mister Cuba 2022 pageant, was replaced by Fabién Laurencio for undisclosed reasons.
- Ecuador: Lisseth Naranjo, former Miss Grand Ecuador who resigned from the title before competing at the international pageant in 2020, was designated as the replacement for Emilia Vásquez, the first runner-up Miss Grand Ecuador 2021 who was appointed the country representative for Miss Grand International 2022, but resigned before competing internationally with undisclosed reasons.
- Mexico: An internal conflict in the licensee team between Orlando Ruiz, a founder of the Concurso Nacional de Belleza México (CNB México) who also served as the general director of Miss Grand México, and Flavio Falsiroli, Miss Grand México national director, caused Orlando Ruiz to depart from the team and his affiliated candidate, Jessica Farjat, who was previously set to represent the country at Miss Grand International 2022, also resigned from the title. Laysha Salazar was then elected as the replacement.
- Panama: Laura de Sanctis, former Miss Universe Panamá, was designated Miss Grand Panamá 2022 by a new Miss Grand Panama licensee, Chass Panamá, who took over the franchise from Señorita Panamá in mid-2022. Originally, Katheryn Yejas, one of the finalists of Señorita Panamá 2022 was named Miss Grand Panamá 2022.
- Venezuela: Sabrina Deraneck, an appointed representative, resigned from the title, and Luiseth Materán was elected as the replacement.

In this 2022 edition, three countries were expected to make their debuts, but two withdrew for unspecified reasons even though their representatives had already been determined; six countries that competed in the 2021 edition withdrew due to a lack of a national licensee, and 15 countries returned to the competition after being absent in the previous editions. Initially, seventy-two countries and territories franchises confirmed that they would send their candidates to Indonesia; however, representatives from Cameroon, the Democratic Republic of the Congo, Kazakhstan, and Kyrgyzstan, withdrew before the pageant started, while the representative from Kosovo withdrew due to health problems at the fourth day of the pre-final activities, making the finalized total of sixty-eight contestants.

The information is summarized below.

Returns
Withdrawals
Debuts
- Last competed in 2014:
  - United Kingdom
- Last competed in 2016:
  - Singapore
  - Turkey
- Last competed in 2017:
  - Uganda
- Last competed in 2018:
  - Denmark
  - Ghana
  - Mongolia
- Last competed in 2019:
  - Ukraine
- Last competed in 2020:
  - Belarus
  - China
  - Crimea
  - Ireland
  - Jamaica
  - Kosovo
  - Poland
- No licensee:
  - Armenia
  - Egypt
  - Liberia
  - Northern Ireland
  - Siberia
  - Sweden
- During the contest:
  - Kosovo
- Representative determined
  but did not compete:
  - Cameroon
  - Democratic Republic of Congo
  - Kazakhstan
  - Kyrgyzstan
- Mozambique

== National preliminary pageants ==
Thirty-nine countries organized national preliminary pageants (A1 - B2) to select their representatives for Miss Grand International 2022, the competition details are shown in the table below; 23 of which were the Miss Grand national contest (A1), however, 3 of these 39 candidates, the original Belgium, Cuba, and Panamanian representatives who were chosen through the respective national pageants, were later replaced by the other appointed candidates, as mentioned above; and the Kyrgyzstan representative withdrew before entering the international contest due to the increase in flight ticket prices during the 2022 Russo-Ukrainian war.

Map shows Miss Grand International 2022 participating countries and territories, classified by representative selection methods
Color keys
A1: Main winner of the Miss Grand National pageant, e.g., Miss Grand Spain of Spain.
A2: Main winner of the national contest with other pageant names apart from Miss Grand, e.g., The Nigerian Queen of Nigeria.
B1: Obtained Miss Grand National as the supplementary title at other national pageants, e.g., the representative from Binibining Pilipinas of the Philippines.
B2: Appointed Miss Grand National after (1) obtaining the supplementary position at other 2022 national pageants or (2) finishing other placements apart from the main winner at the previous Miss Grand National edition. Such as the representative of Ecuador.
C1: Determined through the casting/audition event.
C2: Appointed with no pageant held
D0: No representative

List of the national preliminary pageants for Miss Grand International 2022, by the coronation date
Country/Territory	Pageant	Type	Date and Venue	Entrants	Ref.
Total: 39 pageants		–			–
Nicaragua	Miss Grand Nicaragua	A1	8 August 2021 at Jose de la Cruz Mena Municipal Theater, León	9	
Canada	Miss World Canada	B1	4 October 2021 at Richmond Hill Centre for the Performing Arts, Richmond Hill	40	
Panama^{[α]}	Señorita Panamá	B1	7 November 2021 at Hotel Whyndham Convention Center, Panama City	29	
Kyrgyzstan^{[β]}	Miss Kyrgyzstan	B1	Virtual pageant, the crowning event was held in Bishkek on 22 November 2021	10	
Jamaica	Andwar International Pageant	A2	24 April 2022 at Courtleigh Auditorium, Kingston	20	
Netherlands	Miss Grand Netherlands	A1	24 April 2022 at Leonardo Royal Hotel, Amsterdam	8	
Thailand	Miss Grand Thailand	A1	30 April 2022 at Show DC Hall, Bangkok	77	
Spain	Miss Grand Spain	A1	2 May 2022 at South Park Auditorium, Maspalomas, Las Palmas	34	
Czech Republic	Miss Czech Republic	B1	7 May 2022 at Forum Karlín, Prague	10	
Paraguay	Miss Grand Paraguay	A1	7 May 2022 at Hotel Guaraní, Asunción	18	
El Salvador	CNB El Salvador	A2	28 May 2022 at FEPADE Auditorium, Santa Tecla	14	
Chile	Miss Grand Chile	A1	28 May 2022 at Criss Chacana Model Agency, Iquique	10	
Puerto Rico	Nuestra Belleza Puerto Rico	A2	5 June 2022 at Alejandro Tapia y Rivera Theater, San Juan	23	
Kosovo	Miss Universe Albania and Kosovo	B1	10 June 2022 at Palace of Congresses, Tirana, Albania	22	
Cuba^{[α]}	Miss and Mister Cuba	A2	19 June 2022 at Manuel Artime Theater, Miami, Florida, United States	5	
United States	Miss Grand USA	A1	23 June 2022 at Copernicus Center, Chicago, Illinois	12	
Colombia	Miss Grand Colombia	A1	24 June 2022 at Hotel Grand Park, Bogotá	21	
Costa Rica	Miss Grand Costa Rica	A1	7 July 2022 at Eugene O'Neill Theatre, San José	12	
Ghana	Miss Grand Ghana	A1	8 July 2022 at National Theatre, Accra	16	
Belgium^{[α]}	Miss Grand Belgium	A1	9 July 2022 at AED Studios, Lint	8	
South Africa	Miss Grand South Africa	A1	9 July 2022 at Lake Umuzi Waterfront, Secunda, Mpumalanga	38	
Honduras	Miss Grand Honduras	A1	10 July 2022 at La Galería, Tegucigalpa	18	
Australia	Miss Grand Australia	A1	16 July 2022 at Sofitel Sydney Wentworth Hotel, Sydney	20	
Bolivia	Miss Bolivia	B2	16 July 2022 at Sirionó Hall of FexpoCruz, Santa Cruz de la Sierra	24	
Brazil	Miss Grand Brazil	A1	28 July 2022 in Teatro da CAESB, Brasília, Federal District	31	
Philippines	Binibining Pilipinas	B1	31 July 2022 at Smart Araneta Coliseum, Quezon City	40	
Japan	Miss Grand Japan	A1	6 August 2022 at Yokosuka Arts Theatre, Yokosuka	25	
Nigeria	The Nigerian Queen	A2	20 August 2022 at EUI Event Center, Port Harcourt	40	
Cambodia	Miss Grand Cambodia	A1	27 August 2022 at the Union of Youth Federations of Cambodia (UYFC-PP), Phnom Penh	35	
Malaysia	Miss Grand Malaysia	A1	27 August 2022 at Sabah International Convention Centre, Kota Kinabalu	8	
Laos	Miss Grand Laos	A1	27 August 2022 at Crowne Plaza Vientiane, Vientiane	20	
Germany	Miss From Germany	A2	27 August 2022 at Stroetmanns Fabrik EMS-HALLE, Emsdetten	8	
France	Miss Grand France	A1	3 September 2022 at Le Mughal Restaurant, Chartres	10	
India	Glamanand Supermodel India	B1	4 September 2022 at Zee Studios in Jaipur, Rajasthan	36	
Ukraine	Queen of Ukraine International	A2	9 September 2022 at Theater im Pariser Hof, Wiesbaden, Germany	10	
Nepal	Miss Grand Nepal	A1	10 September 2022 at Kathmandu Marriott Hotel, Kathmandu	14	
Portugal	Miss Portuguesa	B1	11 September 2022 at Casino Estoril, Cascais	19	
Italy	Miss Grand Italy	A1	18 September 2022 at Grand Hotel Pianetamaratea, Maratea (PZ)	40	
Vietnam	Miss Grand Vietnam	A1	1 October 2022 at Phú Thọ Indoor Stadium, District 11, Ho Chi Minh City	52	
Note: ^α Later replaced by the appointed representatives.; ^β Withdrew before entering the international contest, no replacement assigned.
