= Adaeze =

- Gender: Female

Origin
- Language: Igbo
- Meaning: First daughter of the king
- Region of origin: Igboland

Other names
- Variant form: Adaobi

Adaeze // is a feminine Igbo given name. It means "first-born daughter of the eze" and was, traditionally, the title for such a person.

== Names ==
Notable people with this name:

- Adaeze Atuegwu, Nigerian-American novelist
- Adaeze Yobo, Nigerian dancer
