= Ikpeazu =

- Gender: male
- Language: Igbo

Origin
- Origin: Igbo
- Meaning: Secret Judgment or The last
- Region of origin: Igboland

Ikpeazu audio is an Igbo surname and name. it means "Secret Judgment or The last"

== Notable individuals with the name ==
- Okezie Ikpeazu (born 1964), Nigerian politician
- Lynda Chuba-Ikpeazu (born 1966), Nigerian politician
- Uche Ikpeazu (born 1995), English footballer of Ugandan and Nigerian descent
