= Fiona Amuzie-Iredu =

Nigerian model and TV host (born 1991)

- Born: Fiona Afoma Amuzie; 6 October 1991 (age 35)
- Height: 5 ft 8 in (173 cm)

Fiona Afoma Amuzie-Iredu // is a Nigerian actress, TV host, model, psychologist and beauty pageant titleholder. She is the winner of the Most Beautiful Girl in Nigeria (MBGN) 2010 pageant and the Nigeria contestant at the Miss World 2010. She is from Anambra state.

== Early life ==
She hails from Abatete, Idemili-North LGA of Anambra state, located in the southeastern region of Nigeria. She was nicknamed Ezenwanyi - which means queen in Igbo language - by her father.

== Education ==
She was a microbiology undergraduate at the University of Jos when she contested at the Most Beautiful Girl in Nigeria pageant. She didn't complete her education at Jos but moved to the United Kingdom where she obtained a B.Sc. in psychology at the Coventry University.

== Career ==
She was crowned Most Beautiful Girl in Nigeria for the year 2010 and represented Nigeria at the Miss World 2010 pageant. She reached to the disadvantaged people in the society for her pet project.

== Personal life ==
She met her husband at a church program in London.

She is married to Frank Iredu by traditional rites from Obosi, Anambra State on December 30, 2015, and by church wedding on January 2, 2016. She and her husband have one son and a daughter.
