= Sylvia Nduka =

Nigerian beauty pageant winner (born 1992)

- Born: October 14, 1992 (age 34)
- Education: University of Lagos, Nigeria
- Occupation: Entrepreneur
- Known for: Women empowerment & Philanthropy
- Height: 180 cm (5 ft 11 in)
- Honours: Most Beautiful Girl in Nigeria (2011)

Sylvia Nduka (born 14 October 1992) is a Nigerian entrepreneur and beauty pageant titleholder who represented her country at Miss World 2011 but unplaced.

== Early life ==
Sylvia Nduka is from Isuofia in Anambra State. She is the youngest of five siblings. She studied accounting at the University of Lagos.

== Career ==
=== Most Beautiful Girl in Nigeria 2011 ===
She competed as Miss Taraba in the pageant. As the winner, she was awarded a Hyundai car and 3 million naira.

=== Project ===
The focus of her project, 'Sylvia Educational Foundation', was creating an NGO that empowered people through education and served less-privileged children.

== Personal life ==
Sylvia Nduka founded and runs Sylvia's Hair, a hair extension business. Her choice of outfits her Co operate office wears.
