= Omotu Bissong =

Nigerian model

- Born: Cecilia Ohumotu Bissong
- Education: Economics, University of Calabar
- Alma mater: University of Calabar
- Occupations: Actress; Model
- Height: 5 ft 11 in (1.80 m)
- Beauty pageant titleholder
- Title: Most Beautiful Girl in Nigeria 2003
- Hair colour: Black
- Eye colour: Brown
- Major competitions: Most Beautiful Girl in Nigeria 2003 (Winner); Miss Universe 2003 (Unplaced); Miss World 2003 (Unplaced)

Omotu Bissong (born Cecilia Ohumotu Bissong) is a Nigerian actress, tv host, model and beauty pageant titleholder who was crowned Most Beautiful Girl in Nigeria 2003 and represented her country at Miss World 2003 and Miss Universe 2003 pageants. best known as Funke Lawal in Desperate Housewives Africa.

== Early years ==
A native of Yala, Cross River State, Bissong started her modelling career when she was a child. She attended Nigerian Navy Primary school and Nigerian Navy Secondary school, both in Navy Town, Lagos, the latter she completed at the age of fourteen. She studied Economics at the University of Calabar, also has a degree in accounting from the City University of New York.

== Pageants ==
In 2003, Bissong – then credited as Celia Bissong – made history by becoming the first Most Beautiful Girl in Nigeria winner from the South South (Regina Askia, another South South native, had only won by default when she replaced Bianca Onoh in 1989). Her platform was HIV/AIDS Awareness, and Tourism Promotion, and her reign saw her compete at Miss Universe and Miss World.

== Modelling ==
Bissong worked as a model in Nigeria before moving to America, where she signed up with another modeling agency whilst studying Accounting at the City University of New York. In an interview with The Vanguard in 2008, Bissong criticised discrimination against black models in the American fashion industry, and admitted she was facing strong competition.Upon her return to Nigeria, she opened a model management company in a bid to restore professionalism in the industry.

== Television ==
Since returning to her home country in 2009, Bissong has worked in television, presenting The Peak Talent Hunt Show, and Africa Awakes on DSTV. As an actress, Bissong was in the Ghanaian movie Be My Guest with Nadia Buari and Chris Attoh, and is currently starring in the African adaptation of Desperate Housewives as stay-at-home mother Funke Lawal loosely based on Lynette Scavo in the original series.

Television
Year	Project	Role	Notes
2009	The Peak Talent Show	Herself	TV host
2009	Africa Awakes	Herself	TV host
2012	Be My Guest		Film
2015–present	Desperate Housewives Africa	Funke Lawal	Main role

Preceded by Chinenye Ochuba-Akinlade	Most Beautiful Girl in Nigeria; 2003	Succeeded by Anita Uwagbale
