= Toyin Raji =

Nigerian former actress (born c. 1972)

- Born: Toyin Enitan Raji
- Occupation: Systems Analyst
- Children: 1
- Beauty pageant titleholder
- Title: Most Beautiful Girl in Nigeria 1995
- Hair color: Brown
- Eye color: Brown
- Major competitions: Miss Universe 1995; (Unplaced); (Miss Congeniality); Miss World 1995; (Unplaced); (Miss Personality)
- Website: www.thatbeautyqueen.com/about.html

Toyin Enitan Raji (born c. 1972) is a Nigerian former actress and beauty pageant titleholder.

She was crowned Most Beautiful Girl in Nigeria 1995 and represented her country at the Miss Universe 1995 pageant in Windhoek, Namibia and at the Miss World 1995 pageant held in Sun City, South Africa. Raji distinguished herself as Nigeria’s representative at the Miss Universe 1995 pageant in Namibia, finishing in 11th place. Miss South Africa had finished in 10th to deny Raji the chance of becoming Nigeria’s first Miss Universe semi–finalist, although she was awarded the "Miss Congeniality" prize.

In 1995, when Raji went to South Africa for the Miss World contest, she was forced to withdraw following political controversy over Sani Abacha’s decision to execute nine civil rights activists in Nigeria. However, she was awarded the "Miss Personality" prize.

== Miss Universe 1995 ==
As the official representative of Nigeria to the Miss Universe 1995 pageant, broadcast live from Windhoek, Namibia on 12 May 1995, Raji placed 11th overall in the preliminary competition, 7th in a preliminary interview, and 12th in a swimsuit, barely missing the semi-finals by five-hundredths of a point.

Augustine Masilela of South Africa took the 10th place ahead of Raji, preventing her from placing and becoming Nigeria's first Miss Universe semi-finalist. Nonetheless, Raji received the Congeniality award, voted by her fellow contestants.

== Miss World 1995 ==
A few months after Miss Universe 1995, Raji participated in the Miss World 1995 pageant, held in Sun City, South Africa on 18 November 1995. She was forced to withdraw by South African authorities following the political controversy over de facto Nigerian president Sani Abacha's decision to execute nine civil rights activists. Raji still went on to win the Miss Personality award.

== Personal life ==
After appearing in several Nollywood movies and Sunny Ade's Ololufe video, Raji relocated to Texas, where she lives with her daughter and husband. She went on to complete her education and currently works in IT as a Systems Analyst.

== See also ==
- List of Youruba people
- List of Nigerian actress

Awards and achievements
Preceded by Susan Hart	Most Beautiful Girl in Nigeria; 1995	Succeeded by Emma Komlosy
