= Adaeze Yobo =

Nigerian model

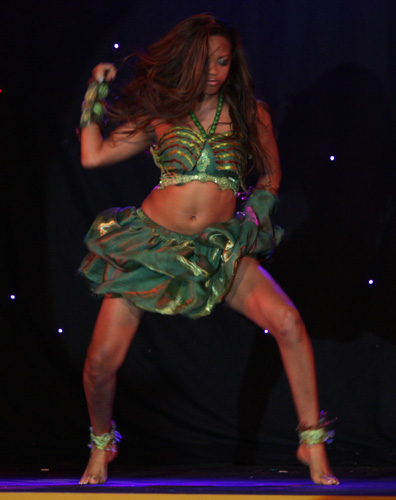
- Adaeze in 2008
- Born: Adaeze Stephanie Chinenye Igwe; April 14, 1990 (age 36)
- Height: 173 cm (5.68 ft)
- Beauty pageant titleholder
- Hair color: Black
- Major competitions: Most Beautiful Girl in Nigeria 2008 (Winner)

Adaeze Yobo (born Adaeze Stephanie Chinenye Igwe) is a Nigerian dancer and beauty pageant titleholder who won the Most Beautiful Girl in Nigeria 2008 and represented Nigeria at the Miss World 2008. She is Igbo from Anambra State, southeastern region of Nigeria.

== Early life ==
After her secondary education she spent one year at home and gained a lot of weight making her mother to lose interest in her modeling career. Her mother later got her a trainer and made her work out on the streets of Abuja and motivated her to focus on Her dream. Her mother has been her best friend since childhood. Her mother was pregnant of her while in law school but remained focused. Her mother was a director in Anambra State Water Corporation. Adaeze has three siblings.

== Career ==
She pursued her childhood dream by representing Anambra State in the MBGN pageant with 29 other girls. Like Ann Suinner before her, Yobo's platform was Sickle Cell Awareness; she also used her reign as a platform to showcase Nigerian talent. Apart from winning five million naira, a Hyundai car, and endorsement deals, Awka-Etiti-native Yobo represented Nigeria at Miss World 2008 in South Africa. She made the top twenty in Miss World Talent, and placed second in Miss World Sports.

During her reign, Yobo established her own charity The Adaeze Igwe Foundation, an organization which promotes AIDS and breast cancer awareness, and raises funds towards similar causes, including malaria and tuberculosis. Its mission was "to create and increase access and opportunities to Nigerian youths and communities towards addressing [their] needs and challenges in relation to health and sustainable development." She attended a short course at the New York Film Academy.

== Personal life ==
Adaeze has a lot of things in common with her Mother. First is their love for Football as well as both getting married at an early age. Her marriage to Joseph Yobo a Football player is blessed with a son named Joey.

In 2010, Yobo married former Nigerian international soccer player Joseph Yobo in a midnight ceremony held in Jos, the capital city of Plateau State, Nigeria after a brief courtship, on New Year's Eve in 2010 at the age of 19. Her marriage to Joseph Yobo a Football player is blessed with a son named Joey. Joey celebrated his first Birthday in Turkey with His Friends and Family. They are now the parents of two sons and a daughter.

In 2011, Yobo was ranked 92 in a list of 101 Sexiest Soccer Wives and Girlfriends, as compiled by Bleacher Report.

In 2014, Adaeze was listed as the 4th Most beautiful African Sportsman wife.

Adaeze's Mum got engaged and Married to ex - Nigerian's Soccer Star John Fashanu. She now bears his name.
