= Chinenye Ochuba-Akinlade =

Nigerian beauty pageant titleholder

- Citizenship: Nigeria
- Education: University of Lagos; University of Greenwich London
- Title: Most Beautiful Girl in Nigeria, 2002
- Spouse: Adekunle Akinlade (2008)

Chinenye Ochuba-Akinlade is a Nigerian model and former beauty pageant winner.

== Early life ==
Ochuba-Akinlade is the seventh of eight children and also a twin. She is an Igbo. She won the 2002 edition of the Most Beautiful Girl in Nigeria pageant while awaiting admission into university. Despite being a favourite for the Miss Universe 2002 crown, she failed to make the top ten, but fared better at Miss World, where she was a top ten finalist, as well as the African Continental Queen of Beauty. Her reign was a scandal-free one.

== Education ==
Ochuba-Akinlade had her secondary education at Regan Memorial Secondary School, then studied Computer Science at the University of Lagos. She also studied Accounting and Finance at the University of Greenwich in London, graduating in 2008 with a second class upper.

== Career ==
She was the Second Best for Miss Universe Pageant in Puerto Rico and Miss World.

== Personal life ==
Ochuba-Akinlade married businessman AdeKunle Tajudeen Akinlade, and worked for ExxonMobil. Ochuba-Akinlade now has two children. He is from Agosasa in Ipokia of Idiroko Ogun State. He is the first born of a family of nine. His mother died in 1997 and his father is a retired Army Officer. He studied Political Science in University of Lagos. He has a six-year old from his previous relationship with Temilade. They met at Lagos in 2004.

Preceded by Agbani Darego	Miss World Africa; 2002	Succeeded by Hayat Ahmed
Preceded by Anne Suinner-Lawoyin	Most Beautiful Girl in Nigeria; 2002	Succeeded by Omotu Bissong
