= Stephanie Okwu =

Nigerian beauty queen (born 1994)

- Born: Stephanie Okwu; 1994 (age 31–32); Imo, Nigeria
- Education: University of Lagos
- Height: 1.85 m (6 ft 1 in)
- Beauty pageant titleholder
- Title: Most Beautiful Girl in Nigeria Universe 2013
- Hair color: Black
- Major competitions: Most Beautiful Girl in Nigeria Universe 2013 (Winner); Miss Universe 2013

Stephanie Okwu // (born 1994) is a Nigerian model and beauty pageant titleholder who crowned as Most Beautiful Girl in Nigeria Universe 2013 and she represented Nigeria at the Miss Universe 2013 pageant in Russia.

== Early life ==
Okwu is a graduate of the University of Lagos.

== Most Beautiful Girl in Nigeria ==
Okwu represented Imo state at the Most Beautiful Girl In Nigeria Universe 2013. She won the pageantry and represented Nigeria at the Miss Universe 2013 competition in Moscow, Russia.

Awards and achievements
| Preceded by Isabella Ayuk | Most Beautiful Girl in Nigeria; 2013 | Succeeded by Queen Celestine |
