= The Nigerian Queen =

- Formation: 2009
- Type: Beauty pageant
- Headquarters: Port Harcourt
- Location: Nigeria
- Members: Miss Grand International
- Official language: English
- President: Kelvin Joseph Amroma
- Key people: Onyeka Agu (Deputy national director)
- Parent organization: 001 Entertainment
- Website: nigerianqueen.org

The Nigerian Queen – abbreviated as TNQ and formerly also known as Miss Grand Nigeria – is an annual Nigerian beauty pageant. Formerly known as Queen of Trust, TNQ is organised by 001 Entertainment. Since 2021, TNQ representatives have competed at Miss Grand International.

The current titleholder is fashion model and former finalist at both MBGN and Miss Nigeria Damilola Bolarinde, who represented Lagos.

== History ==
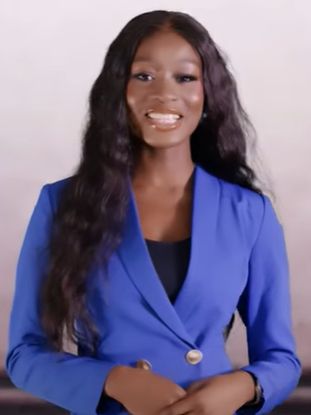
The current titleholder, Damilola Bolarinde

001 Entertainment president, Kelvin Joseph Amroma, established Queen of Trust in 2009, with the first edition held in Port Harcourt. Winners adopt a platform (Known in Nigerian pageants as 'pet project') during their reign – an issue of interest affecting society, and once chosen, they use their status to address the public regarding their platform. In 2015, halfway through the winner's reign, Queen of Trust was renamed The Nigerian Queen, with 2014's titleholder Onyeka Agu named deputy national director. In 2020, for the first time in the pageant's 11-year history, the TNQ final was held in Lagos instead of Port Harcourt.

== Competition ==
As with most major Nigerian pageants, TNQ comprises various segments including local costume, evening gown, and interview. Preliminaries are held before the grand final, and both fashion and talent shows are included. Prior to 2016, contestants wore their first names on their sashes to reflect their individual personalities (Between 2013 and 2014, famous football player names were used), but each girl now represents a state, with more than one contestant occasionally acting as state delegate. Unlike other pageants with strict rules regarding vital statistics, plus-sized have also competed.

The most consistent awards at the TNQ finale are Best Dinner Gown, Best Local Costume (formerly Best Traditional Attire), Miss Popularity, Miss Photogenic, Most Talented, Top Model, and Nigerian Queen Multimedia. Other awards have included Miss Sportswoman and Miss Amity.

Prizes for the winner and runners-up vary each year; as of 2018 the winner receives a Hyundai car, 700 square metres of land, ₦1,000,000, and a trip to Dubai. According to the pageant's president Kelvin Joseph Amroma, during TNQ's first edition, the star prize was a television.

== Titleholders ==
=== Early era: Queen of Trust ===
Year	Queen of Trust (Queen of Trust International)	Runner-Up				Notes
Year	Queen of Trust (Queen of Trust International)	Queen of Trust Africa Miss	Queen of Trust Nigeria	Queen of Trust Super Model	Queen of Trust Top Model	Notes
2009	Preye Inokoba	Unknown	Unknown	Unknown	Unknown	Inokoba was later TNQ director (Queen Mother)
2010	Esthermary Chidinma Akpu	Unknown	Unknown	Unknown	Unknown	
2011	Princess Nkechinyere Nwafor	Unknown	Unknown	Unknown	Unknown	
2012	Joy Ogiator Omoalukhe	Unknown	Unknown	Unknown	Unknown	
2013	Regina Rapheal Ushene (Note: Dethroned/Resigned)	Samantha Ubani	Rebecca Nengi Hampson (Note: Originally crowned Runner-Up; took over title after original winner was dethroned/resigned.)	Edikan Precious Udonyah	Not Awarded	Hampson replaced Ushene as TNQ. Later competed in Big Brother Naija
2014	Christabel Ijeoma Iwuala	Onyeka Maryann Agu	Lizzy Ozoadibe	Not Awarded	Not Awarded	Agu replaced Iwuala as TNQ. Later became TNQ deputy national director
2015	Cynthia Chidinma Ugbah	Tender Chimelu	Christy Ihentuge	Tamara Robert	Jasmine Uwemedimoh	Chimelu replaced Ugbah as TNQ

=== Current era: The Nigerian Queen ===
Year	The Nigerian Queen	Runner-Up			Top Model	Notes
Year	The Nigerian Queen	1st Runner-Up	2nd Runner-Up	3rd Runner Up	Top Model	Notes
2016	Winifred Uduimoh; Abuja	Lucia Adamma Udoh	Precious Elemuwa	Momoh Mamunat	Denner Esther Onyedikachi	
2017	Sandra Essien; Akwa Ibom	Precious Marcus	Lilian Robinson	Patience ngeribo	Fuluife Nkechi	
2018	Rachel Anume; Ondo (G)	Jessica Echendu	Fiona Davies	Ezinne Offiah	Not Awarded	
2019	Ezinne Elizabeth Umeh; Imo	Queen Uju Joy; Lagos	Ada Joy Agwu Eme; Lagos	Not Awarded	Not Awarded	
2020	Chikaodili Enobong Nna-Udosen; Akwa Ibom	Ugoaru Onuoha; Imo	Mercy Babjide; Ekiti	Not Awarded	Not Awarded	First TNQ winner at Miss Grand International
2021	Abimbola Islamiat Rita Abayomi; Lagos	Queen Joy Omanibe; Adamawa	Patience Chenema Christopher; Kogi	Not Awarded	Not Awarded	Patience Christopher (2nd runner-up) represented Nigeria at Miss Grand International
2022	Damilola Bolarinde; Lagos	Nnena Odum; Anambra	Mavis Chizoba Aruma; Yobe	Not Awarded	Damilola Bolarinde; Lagos	

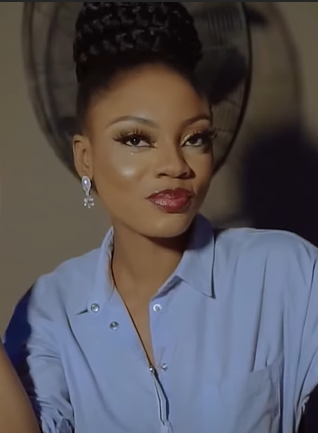
TNQ 2021 1st runner-up Patience Christopher, who achieved Nigeria's first placement (Top 20) at Miss Grand International 2021 in Thailand.

Notes

Winners by State

State	Titles	Winning years
Lagos	2	2021, 2022
Akwa Ibom	2	2017, 2020
Imo	1	2019
Ondo (G)	1	2018
Abuja	1	2016
Unknown	7	2009 – 2015

=== Other notable contestants ===
- Ada Eme - MBGN 2022

== TNQ International Representatives ==
Color keys

- : Declared as Winner
- : Ended as runner-up or Top 5/6 qualification
- : Ended as one of the finalists or semi-finalists
- : Ended as special awards winner

=== Miss Grand International ===
After 001 Entertainment acquired the rights to send delegates to Miss Grand International, Chikaodili Nna-Udosen became TNQ's first Miss Grand representative in 2020. The following year, TNQ runner-up Patience Christopher became the first Nigerian to place at the international pageant.

Year	Representative's Name	State	Title	Placement	Note
(Indonesia) 2022	Damilola Bolarinde	Lagos	The Nigerian Queen 2022	Top 20	Top 8 – Best in National Costume; Top 20 – Best in Swimsuit; Top 20 – Pre-arrival
(Thailand) 2021	Patience Chenema Christopher	Kogi	2nd Runner-Up of The Nigerian Queen 2021	Top 20	Top 20 – Best in National Costume
(Thailand) 2021	Abimbola Islamiat Rita Abayomi	Lagos	The Nigerian Queen 2021	Not able to compete	
(Thailand) 2020	Chikaodili Enobong Nna-Udosen	Akwa Ibom	The Nigerian Queen 2020	Unplaced	Top 15 – Bare Face in 2.30 minutes challenge

=== Miss Eco International ===
In 2021, TNQ acquired the right to send representatives to Miss Eco International. Queen Joy Omanibe, who had placed second runner-up in TNQ, became the first Nigerian to place at the international pageant.

Year	Representative's Name	State	Title	Placement	Note
(Egypt) 2022	Queen Joy Omanibe	Adamawa	1st runner-up of The Nigerian Queen 2021	Top 10	

== Scandal ==
In 2016, Cynthia Ugbah resigned from her position as reigning TNQ after accusing organisers 001 Entertainment of procuring. In a statement Ugbah claimed "They wanted me to sleep with men for money and then give the money to them to better their own organisation. Apparently that's how it works. They are rogues, thieves, fake, and most of all broke, they need pretty girls to fetch them money." However, the organisation argued these were false claims, and Ugbah had been dethroned due to gross misconduct.

== See also ==
- Miss Nigeria
- Most Beautiful Girl in Nigeria
- Miss Earth Nigeria
- Miss Grand Nigeria
- Mr Nigeria
- Miss Universe Nigeria
