= Isabella Ayuk =

Miss Universe 2012 contestant

Isabella Agbor Ayuk
- Born: Isabella Agbor Ayuk; 10 May 1986 (age 40); Cross River, Nigeria
- Education: University of Calabar
- Height: 1.80 m (5 ft 11 in)
- Beauty pageant titleholder
- Title: Most Beautiful Girl in Nigeria 2012
- Hair color: Black
- Eye color: Black
- Major competitions: Most Beautiful Girl in Nigeria 2012 (Winner); Miss Universe 2012 (Unplaced)

Isabella Agbor Ayuk (born 10 May 1986) is a Nigerian actress, entrepreneur, philanthropist and beauty pageant titleholder. She won the Most Beautiful Girl in Nigeria in 2012 and was listed among 100 notable women in Africa.

== Early life ==
Born into a polygamous family, Ayuk is the twentieth out of twenty-four children. She studied business administration at the University of Calabar, graduating in 2011, and served as a youth corper. Prior to winning MBGN, she had competed in the 2009 and 2010 editions, as well as Miss Nigeria 2004, Miss South South 2007, and Miss Global Nigeria 2009. As one of the few contestants to represent their actual state of origin, Ayuk was the first South-South woman to win the title since Celia Bissong in 2003.

== MBGN ==
Ayuk was crowned Most Beautiful Girl in Nigeria in a ceremony held at the Best Western Hotel in Benin City in May 2012. Her main platform is typhoid awareness in memory of her sister who died from the disease.

== Controversy ==
Towards the end of May 2012, it was reported that Ayuk had falsified her age in order to compete in the pageant (she was said to be in her thirties when she finally won the title after participating in past editions), thus introducing the county's biggest pageant scandal since 2001 when Valerie Peterside was dethroned as Miss Nigeria for similar reasons. Although Ayuk did not comment, organisers Silverbird defended her, stating that contrary to popular belief, Ayuk would not be dethroned and would continue her reign as MBGN 2012. She did not represent Nigeria at Miss World, but was replaced by MBGN 2012 runner-up Damiete Charles-Granville

== Philanthropy ==
Despite the controversies that surfaced during her reign as MBGN queen, Ayuk remained involved in philanthropy in Africa. In 2012, Ayuk launched the Vanessa Manyor Memorial Foundation (VMMF), a foundation she named after Vanessa Manyor Ayuk, her late sister who died of typhoid fever. VMMF was committed to the protection of rural dwellers against the spread of typhoid fever, malaria, HIV\AIDS, tuberculosis and other opportunistic infections. Other of her charitable projects under VMMF include giving support to widows and giving scholarships to indigent kids.

Ayuk later changed VMMF to Isabella Ayuk Foundation (IAF), under which she continued her philanthropic deeds. Under IAF, one of her particular philanthropic acts that swept the internet was in 2018 when going after the aid of a certain widow who was thrown out of her home by the children of her late husband, despite being an ex- beauty queen Ayuk was said to have travelled the remotest part of Cross River even sailing by boat at some points to Bendeghe-Afi community, where the widow resides. That same year she reached out to widows and displaced refugees from Cameroon.

Ayuk has also been involved in raising awareness of cervical cancer and supporting women living with the disease. In 2019, she provided free cervical cancer public and preventive education, screening and diagnostic services to underserved women in Cross River State through her foundation.

== UN representation and peace talks ==
In 2018, Ayuk attended the United Nations Youth Assembly at the United Nations Headquarters in Manhattan, New York, as an observer. The event was held ubder the theme "Innovation and Collaboration of the Sustainable Development Goals".

In 2017, Ayuk called on Nigerians to embrace love, promote peace and national unity during a courtesy visit by the Cross River Most Beautiful Girl (CRMBG) queen, Miss Christine Edet.

== Business ==
Apart from pageantry, Ayuk is involved in several business ventures including a fashion line. On 27 February 2013, Ayuk launched her fashion brand, Bellesabel, in Abuja. Bellesabel was coined from the French word belle meaning "beauty", and "Sabel", a shortened of Isabella.

== Pageant founding ==
On May 24, 2014, Ayuk founded the Cross River Most Beautiful Girl, (CRMBG) Pageant in Nigeria.

== Acting ==
On her 27th birthday in 2013, Ayuk announced plans to feature in a film, Alok Monument, the Pride Within, in a telephone interview with Obaji Akpet of The Nation newspaper, which took place at Clay Night Club in Abuja. Akpet later became Ayuk's publicist and worked on her CRMBG event.

== Personal life ==
Although she likes to keep her personal life secret, in 2020 Ayuk was reported to have flaunted a photograph of her and a man on her WhatsApp status, the man whose name she did not disclose was believed to have engaged her for marriage; and that was Ayuk's last known public appearance. Neither can it be confirmed if she and the man she flaunted have been married.

Awards and achievements
Preceded by Sophie Gemal	Most Beautiful Girl in Nigeria; 2012	Succeeded by Stephanie Okwu
