= Glory Chukwu =

Nigerian model

- Born: Glory Chukwu
- Beauty pageant titleholder
- Title: Most Beautiful Girl in Nigeria 2009 (Winner); Miss World 2009 (Unplaced)
- Major competition: Most Beautiful Girl in Nigeria 2009

Glory Umunna // (born Glory Chukwu //) is a Nigerian model and beauty pageant titleholder who won the Most Beautiful Girl in Nigeria 2009. She competed in Miss World 2009 in Johannesburg, South Africa. She is Igbo from Abia State.

== Education ==
She began her formal education in Europe, then (Yugoslavia now Serbia and Montenegro) and completed her secondary education in the Republic of Benin.

In 2007, Umunna obtained a BSC degree in Microbiology from the University of Nigeria, Nsukka. Afterwards she went to Lagos in 2008 for Her National Youth Service Corps.

She also has a Masters in Management and Information Systems from Cranfield, UK.

== Early life ==
Glory was born on July 19 in Luanda Angola as the third of her parents' five children. She joined her family church choir at the age of 8.

Despite hailing from South-eastern Nigeria, Umunna represented a Northern Nigeria state, Nassarawa State, in a final held for the first time in Owerri, the capital city of Imo State. At twenty-three, Glory became queen. She speaks some French as well as English and her native Igbo.

Among Umunna's goals is working with a charity organisation which supports disadvantaged children in her country, and getting involved in the rehabilitation and renovation of children's wards in Nigerian hospitals.

== Personal life ==
In July 2011, Umunna married civil engineer Uchechi Umunna. The couple are parents to two daughters. She was born into a Christian family and currently serves at her local Church Choir and Teenage Department.

== Career ==
She ventured into pageantry and won the Most Beautiful Girl in Nigeria 2009 organized by the Silverbird Television. She was also a representative at the Miss World Pageant in 2009. She has been a speaker and facilitator at youth seminars and led charity initiatives during her tenure as MBGN in 2009. She works as a registered nurse.
