= Omasan Buwa =

Nigerian beauty pageant contestant

Omasan Tokunbo Buwa
- Beauty pageant titleholder
- Title: Most Beautiful Girl in Nigeria 1987
- Major competitions: Miss Nigeria 1987; Miss Intercontinental 1988

Omasan Tokunbo Maxine Buwa (born October 27, 1965) is a Nigerian social worker, media commentator and beauty pageant titleholder who was crowned Most Beautiful Girl in Nigeria 1987. Throughout her career, she has worked as a model, television presenter, restaurateur, and actress, and most recently has appeared as a panellist on the TV show The Amazons.

== Early life ==
Buwa was born in Paddington, London, but at age of seven she moved to Nigeria with her mother, a teacher and Nigerian Airways' head of catering. She attended Government College, Ikorodu where she showed interest in reading, debating, and track and field sports, and enrolled at the University of Maiduguri to study English Language. As a model under the Pandora model agency, Buwa modelled for several designers including Dakova and Labanella, and for advertising agencies such as Insight Communication and Rosabel.

== Pageantry ==
In 1987, Buwa competed in Miss Nigeria and lost to Stella Okoye, but won the second edition of Most Beautiful Girl in Nigeria, representing Warri. Her coronation was marred by protests from the audience who favoured first runner-up Niki Onuaguluchi who had flown in from Los Angeles to compete in the pageant. The judges defended their decision on grounds that Onuaguluchi, whose height was a mere 5'6", stood a lesser chance than her taller rivals at the forthcoming Miss Intercontinental. Buwa, on her part, accused her runner-up of rallying supporters to cheer her to victory.

During her reign, critics unfavourably described Buwa as unconventional and tomboyish, yet she still represented Nigeria at Miss Intercontinental 1987 where she reached the top 5, and at Miss Universe, and Miss World the following year before returning to the University of Maiduguri. However, the institution's predominantly Muslim authorities expelled her due to her participation in pageants which they described as immoral. In 1989, Buwa co-hosted the Miss Intercontinental pageant held in Lagos, alongside Ben Murray-Bruce.

== Career ==
After her reign, Buwa purchased a jazz/restaurant in Lagos, and established an aesthetics and cosmetology business. She also opened the modelling agency, "Queens LT", with fashion designer Funmi Ajila. As an actress, Buwa took the lead in the movie Scattered Pictures, and the soap operas Memories and Ripples. She also worked as the host of weekend breakfast television program Morning Ride broadcast on NTA 2 Channel 5, and appeared in regular segments on BEN Television, London. Buwa later moved to New York where she worked as a make-up artist, with clients including Naomi Campbell and Mary J. Blige.

Buwa - who later acquired a Law degree from the University of North London - was subsequently employed as an attorney and a social worker for special needs children whilst working part-time as a model in Ohio and writing for The Diasporan Star, an American-based Nigerian magazine. She also wrote the column "Generation Max" for Whispaz Magazine. In 2009, Buwa returned to Nigeria where the Delta state governor, Emmanuel Uduaghan, supported her programme "Rise" which helped meet the needs of people with disabilities. She has appeared on socio-political radio programs and has written for magazines. She also created an entity called "Maximillia 3", which mentors young people interested in a career in the media and discourages abuse of young women in the beauty pageant industry.

== Personal life ==
Buwa has a daughter and twin sons with her ex-husband, and is of the opinion that she is still in search of a better man. Buwa's sons have helped expand her programme with the subsidiary "Rise 2".

== See also ==
- Banke Meshida Lawal
- Joy Adenuga

Preceded by Lynda Chuba-Ikpeazu	Most Beautiful Girl in Nigeria; 1987	Succeeded by Bianca Onoh
