= Anne Suinner-Lawoyin =

Nigerian model

Anne Suinner-Lawoyin (born Anne Titilope Suinner, September 4, 1981) is a Nigerian businesswoman, former TV presenter and beauty pageant titleholder.

Suinner was born to the family of Patrick M. Suinner, hailing from Takum local council, Taraba State. In 2001, she placed second in the Most Beautiful Girl in Nigeria pageant, but replaced Agbani Darego after the latter was crowned Miss World. Suinner-Lawoyin, who had represented Abuja, later revealed she never intended to participate, but relented after pageant organisers persuaded her when she accompanied a friend to the screening. As reigning MBGN, Suinner-Lawoyin worked with several projects including Sickle Cell Awareness.

After reigning for five months, Suinner-Lawoyin returned to the Olabisi Onabanjo University, graduating with a Philosophy degree, and was a presenter with M-NET in addition to hosting the Coca Cola Mega Millions Show with Daddy Freeze. Now married, she resides in America where she studied Nursing at the University of North Carolina, and launched an organic skincare brand, Anne's Apothecary, as part of her mission to reduce daily life toxins following the loss of her mother to lung cancer.

Preceded by Agbani Darego	Most Beautiful Girl in Nigeria; 2001	Succeeded by Chinenye Ivy Ochuba
