= Ebinabo Potts-Johnson =

Nigerian model

Ebinabo Potts-Johnson (born 1988) is a Nigerian model and beauty pageant titleholder who was crowned Most Beautiful Girl in Nigeria Universe 2007 and has represented her country in the Miss Universe 2007 competition. She now works as a model.
