= Matilda Kerry =

Nigerian doctor

Matilda Kerry is a Nigerian physician, television host and beauty pageant titleholder. She won the Most Beautiful Girl in Nigeria (MBGN) in 2000 and in 2001 she handed over to Agbani Darego who won Miss World International Beauty Contest. She currently a co-host on the Nigerian version of The Doctors.

== Education ==
Kerry attended Federal Girls College, Benin, where she obtained her WAEC certificate. Following her secondary education, she gained admission into the University of Lagos to study Medicine and Surgery. She also holds a master's degree in public health and is a member of the West African College of Public Health Physicians, and a Sexuality Leadership Development Fellow.

== Career ==
Kerry graduated from the University of Lagos in 2006, and now practices medicine, specialising in community medicine. She is president of the George Kerry Life foundation, a foundation that gives awareness about non-communicable diseases (NCD's).

She is part of the Young African Leaders Initiative, a flagship program of President Barack Obama. In 2016, she was a Mandela Washington fellow, where she joined 1000 other young African leaders in Washington DC for the Presidential summit in 2016 to strategise on moving Africa forward.

== Publications ==
Kerry has publications that included:

Acceptance of human papillomavirus self-testing in cervical cancer prevention among rural Nigerian women.

Life After an Autism Diagnosis: The Ultimate Guide to Home Proofing for your Autistic Child.
