= Ada Eme =

Nigerian model (born 1998)

Ada Agwu Eme
- Born: 1998 (age 27–28)
- Education: National Open University of Nigeria
- Height: 1.88 m (6 ft 2 in)
- Beauty pageant titleholder
- Title: Most Beautiful Girl in Nigeria 2022
- Hair color: Black
- Eye color: Black

Ada Agwu Joy Eme (born 1998) is a Nigerian model, entrepreneur and beauty pageant titleholder who was crowned Most Beautiful Girl in Nigeria 2022. She represented Nigeria at the Miss World 2023, where she placed in the top 40.

== Early life and education ==
Eme is from Amaogudu Abiriba in Ohafia Local Government Area of Abia State.

She attended Oshogbo Government High School in Lagos, Nigeria. In 2019, she gained admission to the National Open University of Nigeria, Lagos to study peace and conflict studies.

== Pageantry ==
In 2022, Eme was one of 36 contestants in the 34th edition of the Most Beautiful Girl in Nigeria pageant, held at Eko Hotels and Suites, Lagos State. She won the title, succeeding Oluchi Madubuike, the 2021 titleholder.
