= Anita Uwagbale =

Nigerian model

Anita Queen Uwagbale is a Nigerian businesswoman and beauty pageant titleholder.

Edo-native Uwagbale spent most of her early years in Lagos until she gained admission into Madonna University, Port Harcourt to study Accountancy. As an undergraduate, Uwagbale was crowned Most Beautiful Girl in Nigeria 2004, enabling her to take part in Miss Universe and Miss World later in the year. At Miss World 2004 Uwagbale placed among the top 15 semi-finalists and was named African Continental Queen of Beauty. As MBGN, Uwagbale's platform was Environmental Pollution.

From 2008 to 2018, Uwagbale was married to businessman Tom Iseghohi, whom she met halfway through her reign as MBGN. Following a registry ceremony in America, the couple hosted a society wedding in Lagos in 2008, and are now the parents of two sons and one daughter.

Uwagbale continued to study in America while running her businesses which include motherhood retail chain The Baby Store. In May 2011, Uwagbale's baby store opened in the Chase Mall, along Ademola Adetokunbo street, Victoria Island, Lagos, Nigeria.

Preceded by Hayat Ahmed	Miss World Africa; 2004	Succeeded by Nancy Sumari
Preceded by Omotu Bissong	Most Beautiful Girl in Nigeria; 2004	Succeeded by Omowunmi Akinnifesi
