= ECOWAS Peace Pageant =

International beauty pageant

- Logo of the ECOWAS Peace Pageant
- Formation: 2008
- Type: Beauty Pageant
- Members: 30
- Official language: English, French, Portuguese
- Website: Official website

The ECOWAS Peace Pageant is an annual international beauty pageant established in 2008 for promoting peace and the youth agenda of the ECOWAS Commission to the global community. It is open to delegates from the 15 member-states of the Economic Community of West African States (ECOWAS )/Communauté Économique Des États de l'Afrique de l'Ouest/Comunidade Económica dos Estados da África Ocidental (CEDEAO). However, since each country sends two delegates, the pageant membership is 30.

The 2012 Ecowas Peace Ambassador is Zirra Banu from Nigeria who was crowned in Port Harcourt on Friday, 14 December 2012.

The venue for the pageant is selected by the ECOWAS Peace Pageant organization and the ECOWAS commission based on which country offering optimal support to the organization is chosen.

The pageant winner is expected to spend one year to champion the cause for the pageant organisation's official charity, and avail herself for all fund-raising events.

== History ==
The Miss ECOWAS Peace Pageant is organised by 702 Productions Ltd., an Accra-based events management company, under the auspices of the ECOWAS Commission. It is intended to promote peace and the youth agenda of the ECOWAS Commission to the global community.

== Titleholders ==
Year	Country	Miss ECOWAS Peace Ambassador	Location
2005	Cape Verde	Neves Tania	Abuja, Nigeria
2006	Ivory Coast	Alima Diomandé	Lomé, Togo
2007	Senegal	Aminata Diallo	Abidjan, Ivory Coast
2008	Senegal	Fatoumata Diallo Tima	Port Harcourt, Nigeria
2009	Nigeria	Joy Ngozika Obasi	Port Harcourt, Nigeria
2010	Ghana	Shirley Nwangere	Freetown, Sierra Leone
2011	Cape Verde	Vanny Reis	Freetown, Sierra Leone
2012	Nigeria	Zirra Banu	Port Harcourt, Nigeria
