= Queen Celestine =

Nigerian model (born 1992)

Queen Osem Celestine
- Born: Queen Celestine; 18 March 1992 (age 34); Lagos, Nigeria
- Height: 1.78 m (5 ft 10 in)
- Beauty pageant titleholder
- Title: Most Beautiful Girl in Nigeria Miss Amity 2014
- Hair color: Black
- Eye color: Brownish green
- Major competitions: Miss Nigeria First Runner Up 2013; Most Beautiful Girl in Nigeria Universe 2014 (Winner); Miss Universe 2014 (Unplaced) (Miss Congeniality)

Queen Celestine (born 18 March 1992) is a Nigerian model, chef and beauty pageant titleholder who was crowned Most Beautiful Girl in Nigeria Universe 2014 and represented Nigeria at the Miss Universe 2014 pageant.

== Early life ==
Queen graduated at Madonna University and she is a former ambassador of Edo in Nigeria.

== Pageantry ==
=== Miss Nigeria 2013 ===
Queen participated in the Miss Nigeria 2013 pageant and was the First runner-up.

=== Most Beautiful Girl in Nigeria (MGBN) 2014 ===
Queen won Miss Amity and was crowned as the MGBN Universe (Most Beautiful Girl in Nigeria) 2014 on July 19, 2014. At same event she was crowned together with the first winner who was crowned as MGBN World 2014, Iheoma Nnadi.

=== Miss Universe 2014 ===
Queen competed at the Miss Universe 2014 pageant and won as Miss Congeniality.
