= Regina Askia-Williams =

Nigerian actress (born 1967)

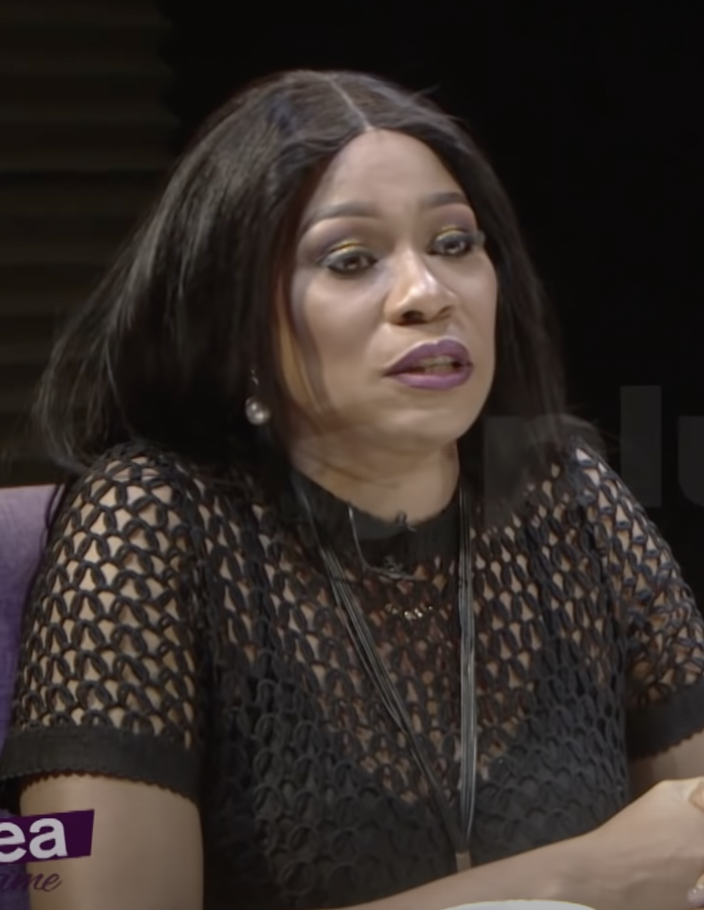
- Born: Imaobong Regina Askia Usoro; 16 December 1967 (age 58); Lagos, Lagos State, Nigeria
- Other name: Regina Askia
- Education: University of Calabar; University of Lagos; Wagner College
- Occupations: Nurse practitioner, actress, former model
- Beauty pageant titleholder
- Title: Most Beautiful Girl in Nigeria 1989, Miss Unilag 88
- Hair colour: Brown
- Eye colour: Hazel
- Major competition: Most Beautiful Girl in Nigeria 1989

Regina Askia-Williams (born Imaobong Regina Askia Usoro on 16 December 1967) is a Nigerian-born, American-based actress, model, and former beauty Queen of the University of Lagos titleholder. She received her certification as a Family Nurse Practitioner (FNP) and practices in New York City. She writes and speaks publicly advocating for African outreach in children's health, education, and economic development.

== Career ==
=== Beauty pageants ===
In 1988, Askia-Williams, a former medical student who had transferred from the University of Calabar to the University of Lagos, was crowned Miss Unilag. That same year, she placed second in the Most Beautiful Girl in Nigeria (MBGN) contest. In 1989, she assumed the title of MBGN when winner Bianca Onoh resigned. In 1990, Askia-Williams represented Nigeria at Miss Charm International held in Leningrad, Russia, and came second. She was the first Nigerian to compete at the Miss International pageant in Japan, where she was awarded most outstanding traditional costume.

=== Modeling ===
After gaining public recognition in Nigeria as a beauty pageant winner, a modeling career opened up for Askia-Williams. She appeared in several Nigerian print and television commercials, including international accounts Visine, Chicken George fast food, Kessingsheen Hair Care, and boutique chain Collectibles. She also worked on several runway shows, and in 2007, she modeled for the 2000-N-Six face cleansing range alongside her daughter, model Stephanie Hornecker. In 2006, Askia-Williams hosted a charity fashion show at Lehman College in the Bronx, New York, which displayed the creations of top African designers and her own label Regine Fashions.

=== Acting ===
Askia-Williams's acting break came in 1993, when she played gold-digger "Tokunbo Johnson" in the Nigerian soap Fortunes (later Mega Fortunes) on NTA Network, a role which earned her critical acclaim and recognition as a Nigerian actress. As a result, Askia-Williams starred in several "Nollywood" films during the 1990s and early 2000s, most of which were filmed to be released directly to video to a wide audience in Nigeria, Tanzania, and Ghana, and broadcast by Nigerian television networks ITV, StarTV, and the state broadcaster TVT. She took some time off^{[when]} and returned to acting in a Nigerian film entitled Web. She received the "Best Actress in Nigeria" award in 2000 from Afro Hollywood London for her performance.

== Personal life ==
Askia-Williams currently lives in America with her family. She is a graduate of the University of Lagos, Nigeria with a degree in Biology. She earned her nursing degree at Wagner College in the United States. and is now a family nurse practitioner practicing in New York City. Only three months after relocating to New York City with her family, she survived the attack on the World Trade Center on 11 September 2001. She escaped from the building, where she worked at the time.

Askia-Williams is married to American Rudolph 'Rudy' Williams, nephew of Ron Everette and grandson of Fess Williams. The couple have two children together: daughter Teesa Olympia and son Rudolph Junior. Askia-Williams has another daughter from a previous relationship, model Stephanie Horneck.

== Advocacy and medical outreach ==
Askia-Williams has maintained an active interest in supporting medical outreach in Nigeria. In 2005, she hosted a fashion show at the Nigerian Embassy in New York City to raise awareness of the plight of children's social amenities in Nigeria.

In 2007, Askia-Williams was among several African women given an award by the Celebrating African Motherhood Organization (CAM) at a gala event in Washington, D.C.

Askia-Williams continues to promote greater collaboration between Africa and its diaspora with fashion shows as well as medical missions to Africa. She co-hosts an Internet broadcast discussion program, African Health Dialogues. The program covers such topics as the effectiveness of mobile medical clinics in Africa. Her written articles have also appeared online, and in the "Saturday Clinic" series in the Nigerian newspaper This Day.

== Filmography ==
As an actress, Askia-Williams has starred in the following films:

- Slave Warrior (2012) as Roslyn
- How We Lived - Slave Warrior (2012) as Present-day Ada
- Slave Warrior: The Beginning (video) (2007)
- Veno (video) (2004)
- Dangerous Babe (2003) as Janet
- Man Snatcher (video) (2003)
- Festival of Fire (2002)
- Vuga (video) (2000)
- Vuga 2 (video) (2000)
- The President's Daughter (2000)
- Highway to the Grave (2000) as Sonia
- Curse from Beyond (1999) as Janet
- Dirty Game (video) (1998)
- Full Moon (1998) as Lucy
- Suicide Mission (1998) as Monique
- Juliet Must Die
- Maximum Risk
- Mena
- Queen of the Night
- Red Machete
- Most Wanted (1998) as Cleopatra
- Rituals (1997) as Regina Askia Williams

Preceded by Bianca Onoh	MBGN1989; 1989	Succeeded by Sabina Umeh
