= Anna Banner =

Nigerian pageant and actress

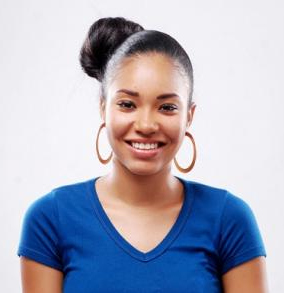
- Banner in 2014
- Born: Anna Ebiere Banner; 18 February 1995 (age 31)
- Occupations: Actress, model
- Awards: Most Beautiful Girl In Nigeria 2013

Anna Ebiere Banner (born 18 February 1995) is a Nigerian actress, model and beauty pageant titleholder. She was crowned Most Beautiful Girl in Nigeria 2013 by 2012 MBGN Isabella Ayuk and represented Nigeria at the Miss World 2013 pageant. She was appointed as the Special Assistant on Culture and Tourism to Governor Henry Dickson upon her reign as Most Beautiful Girl in Nigeria (MBGN) in 2012. In 2014, she made her acting debut in Super Story.

== Personal life ==
In 2014, she started a relationship with the famous Nigerian singer and songwriter Chinedu Okoli, popularly known as Flavour. Banner, aged 20, became pregnant with Flavour's child, giving birth to a girl, Sofia Okoli, on August 1, 2015

By 2016, Banner had cut ties with Flavour, alleging that the singer was cheating with former girlfriend and baby mama, Sandra Okagbue. Sandra is also a former beauty queen.

While Banner and Flavour currently maintain a cordial co-parenting relationship, she has since come out to recount her many experiences raising her daughter. She had dropped out of Middlesex University, UAE as she couldn't cope with studying and being a mother at nineteen. She also noted that her parents were disappointed in her for getting pregnant out of wedlock. On February 1, 2021, she posted on her Instagram page how she struggled for years and almost took her own life. She is now dating Abdullahi Ahmed Osikhena Sa’ad.
