= Anita Ukah =

Nigerian model

- Born: Anita Ukah; August 14, 1995 (age 31)
- Education: Igbinedion University, Okada
- Height: 1.88 m (6 ft 2 in)
- Beauty pageant titleholder
- Title: Most Beautiful Girl in Nigeria 2018
- Hair color: Black
- Eye color: Black

Anita Ukah (born 14 August 1995) is a Nigerian model, entrepreneur and beauty pageant titleholder who was crowned as the winner of the 2018 edition of the Most Beautiful Girl in Nigeria pageant.

She represented Nigeria at the 2018 Miss World pageant held on 8 December 2018 at the Sanya City Arena in Sanya, China, where she came in Top 30 at the Miss World competition. She was also a finalist in the Big Brother Naija Season 9 "No Loose Guard" Reality Show

== Early life ==
Ukah hails from Imo state and is from a family of seven. She is a medical laboratory scientist who attended Igbinedion University, Okada, graduating in 2016. She earned a master's degree in public health from University of Chester.

== Pageantry ==
Anita's first pageantry was in her university where she won Miss Igbinedion University Okada (IUO) contest in 2014. In 2018, Ukah represented Imo state at the Most Beautiful Girl in Nigeria 2018. At the grand finale which held at the Okara Cultural Centre in Yenagoa, Bayelsa, she was crowned as the Most Beautiful Girl in Nigeria.

== Other ventures ==
Ukah who is known for her promotion of locally made goods in 2019, launched her own fashion accessories brand called The Uzo Brand. The company produces leather made goods from locally sourced materials. The brand mainly focuses on bags. Under the brand, she released her own bag collection.
