= Miss Earth Nigeria =

Nigerian national beauty pageant

- Formation: 2002
- Type: Beauty pageant
- Headquarters: Lagos
- Location: Nigeria
- Members: Miss Earth
- Official language: English
- President: Ibinabo Fiberesima
- Website: www.missearthnigeria.com

Miss Earth Nigeria is a national beauty pageant in Nigeria to select its representative to the international Miss Earth pageant. The pageant, with the theme "Beauties for a Cause" is organized by AMC Productions, and began sending representatives to Miss Earth a year after the international pageant was established in 2001. Nigeria has achieved seven placements in Miss Earth.

The current titleholder is Divine Nelson.

== History ==
Originally, titleholders were contestants from rival pageants Miss Commonwealth Nigeria (Vanessa Ibene Ekeke) and Miss Nigeria (Ewemade Ogbebor), until Miss Earth Nigeria became a pageant with its own right in 2004. The winner is expected to work in collaboration with environmentalist and state parastatals on how to make water safe, check erosion, pollution among others. The pageant also conducts road shows to educate people on the three R's (Reduce, Reuse, Recycle).

Nigeria produced its first Miss Earth top ten finalist when Susan Modupe Garland entered in the top 10 in 2019.

The president and national director of the pageant is Ibinabo Fiberesima, a pageant veteran who is now a Nollywood actress.

== Titleholders ==
Color key

- Declared as Winner
- Ended as runner-up
- Ended as one of the finalists or semifinalists
- Ended as special awards winner

Below are the Nigerian representatives to the Miss Earth pageant according to the year in which they participated. The special awards received and their final placements in the aforementioned global beauty competition are also displayed.

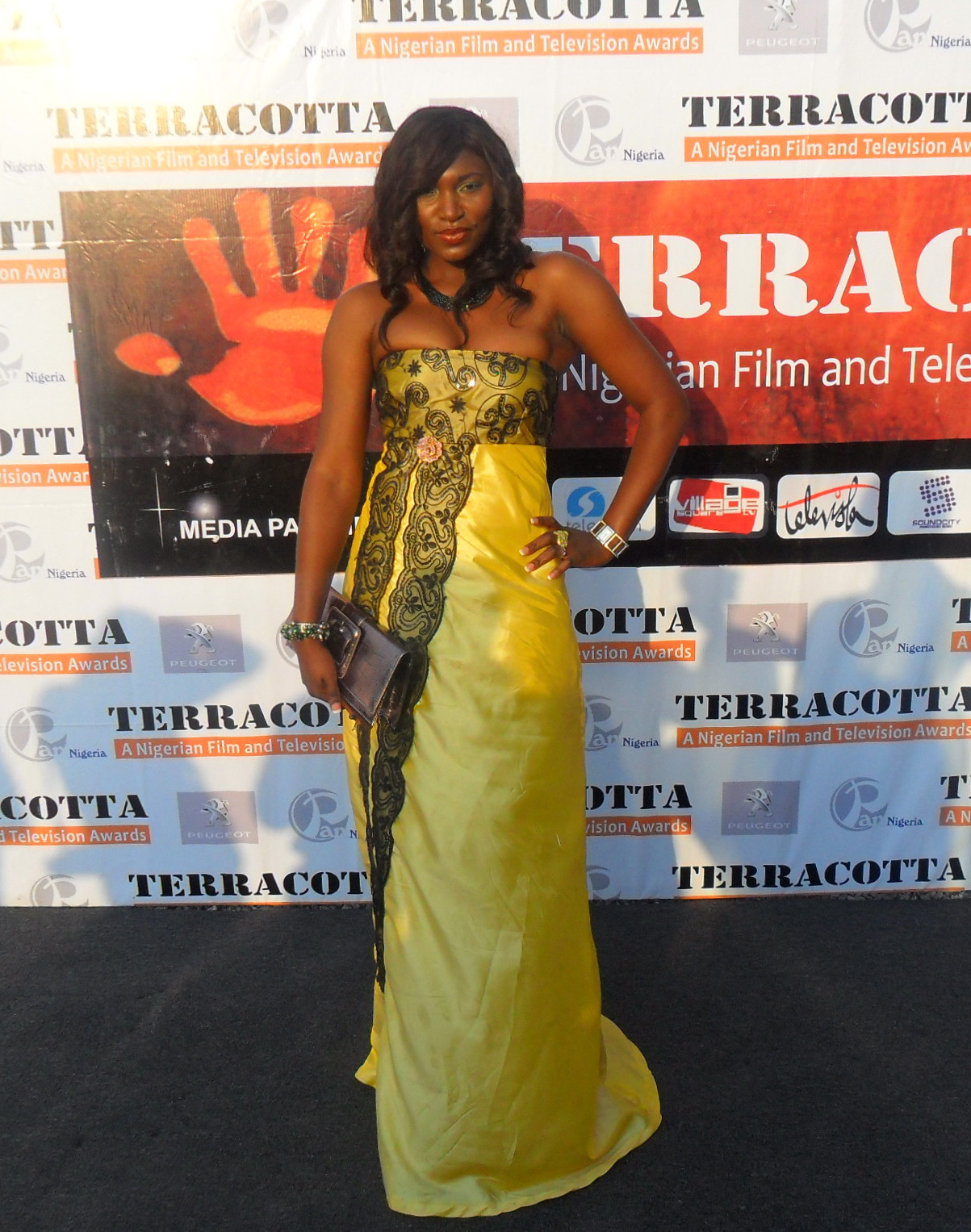
Ufuoma Ejenobor, winner of the first Miss Earth Nigeria pageant in 2004

Year	Miss Earth Nigeria	Placement	Notes
2002	Vanessa Ibene Ekeke	Unplaced	
2003	Eva Ewemade Ogbebor	Unplaced	
2004	Ufuoma Stacey Ejenobor	Unplaced	
2005	Ethel Okosun	Unplaced	
2006	Ivy Obrori Edenkwo	Unplaced	
2007	Stacey Garvey	Top 16	
2008	Ezinne Uko	Top 16	
2009	Nkesi Gift Okandu (Dethroned)		
2009	Modesta Tochi Alozie (Replaced Okandu)	Unplaced	
2010	Inarah Anthonia Isaiah	Unplaced	
2011	Munachi Chinyere Uzoma (Dethroned)	Unplaced	
2012	No Contest Held		
2013	Marie Miller	Unplaced	
2014			
2014	Damola Akinsanya (Replaced Uwakwe)	Unplaced	(gold) Best Teacher
2015	Vivian Chinonye Chukwukere	Unplaced	
2016	Chioma Precious Obiadi	Unplaced	(bronze) National Costume (Africa)
2017	Eucharia Windy Akani	Unplaced	(bronze) Long Gown (Group 2)
2018	Maristella Chidiogo Okpala	Unplaced	(bronze) National Costume (Africa)
2019	Modupe Susan Garland	Top 10	(silver) Swimsuit (Fire); (bronze) National Costume (Africa)
2020	Gwenivere Chioma Ifeanyieze	Top 20	(gold) National Costume (Africa); (gold) Evening Gown Competition (Africa); (gold) Sport Wear Competition (Africa); (silver) Talent (Sing) (Africa); (bronze) Swimsuit Competition (Africa)
2021	Christine Telfer Ugah Edet	Top 20	Best Eco Video (Africa)
2022	Esther Oluwatosin Ajayi	Top 12	Darling of the Press (Africa); Best Fauna Outfit (Africa); Best National Costume (Africa); (gold) Swimsuit Competition (Africa); (gold) Talent Competition (ECO Group)
2023	Shelly Uzoagba Ugoma	Unplaced	
2024	Shuntell Ezomo	Top 12	(gold) Upcycling Fashion Show (Air Group)
2025	Divine Nelson	Unplaced	
2026	TBA	TBA	

=== Other notable contestants ===
- Chikaodili Nna-Udosen (2015) - TNQ 2020

== Controversy ==
In 2009, Law student Nkesi Okandu was dethroned by pageant organisers after she refused to compete in Miss Globe International as opposed to Miss Earth. Fiberesima later claimed that she had received threatening phone calls from Okandu's family who argued that her substitution was unfair. The newly crowned queen was labelled "rude" by the organisers, and was forced to resign after just two weeks, allowing second-place winner Biochemistry student Modesta Alozie to compete at Miss Earth instead, and reign as Miss Earth Nigeria for the remaining eleven months. It has since been argued that this was a plan to eliminate the winner, noting that while Okandu had signed her contract on September 25 (the same day she was asked to compete in for Miss Globe International), Alozie was already being credited as the winner of Miss Earth Nigeria on the Miss Earth website as early as September 22.

Munachi Uzoma, who won the pageant in 2011, sued the organisers for breach of contract following their failure to give her the N1,000,000 cash prize and brand new car, and disclosed that some of her predecessors also suffered similar treatment.
