= University of Benin =

University of Benin (for French speaking countries, also "Université du Bénin") may refer to:

- University of Abomey-Calavi (formerly National University of Benin), in Cotonou, Benin
- University of Benin (Nigeria), in Benin City, Nigeria
- University of Benin (Togo), now the University of Lomé

== See also ==
- Université Nationale du Bénin FC
