= Unoaku Anyadike =

Nigerian model (born 1994)

- Born: Unuoaku Temitope Anyadike; September 16, 1994 (age 32)
- Height: 1.82 m (5 ft 11 1/2 in)
- Beauty pageant titleholder
- Title: Most Beautiful Girl in Nigeria 2015
- Hair color: Black
- Eye color: Brown
- Major competitions: Most Beautiful Girl in Nigeria 2014 (Top 15); Most Beautiful Girl in Nigeria 2015; (Winner); Miss World 2015; (Unplaced); Miss Universe 2016; (Unplaced)

Unoaku Anyadike // (born Unoaku Temitope Anyadike on September 16, 1994) is a Nigerian model and beauty pageant titleholder who was crowned as the winner of the 2015 edition of the Most Beautiful Girl in Nigeria pageant.

== Early life ==
Born into a middle-class family to an Igbo father and a Yoruba mother, both educators in Osun State, southwestern Nigeria.

== Education ==
Unoaku furthered her education in the University of Ibadan where she studied and bagged a bachelor's degree in psychology.

== Personal life ==
She struggled with Endometiosis during her reign. On September 15, 2017 she stepped aside as Queen for a new queen to be crowned. The event took place at Eko Hotels and Suites Victoria Island Lagos State.

== Career ==
She works with the Federal Inland Revenue Service (FIRS). She partners with Nordica Fertility Centre She also acts as an Endometriosis Ambassador during events.

== Pageantry ==
=== Most Beautiful Girl in Nigeria 2014 ===
Unoaku contested at the 2014 edition of the Most Beautiful Girl in Nigeria representing Lagos State, southwestern Nigeria.

=== Most Beautiful Girl in Nigeria 2015 ===
On October 24, 2015, while representing Anambra State, a state located in the southeastern region of Nigeria, Unoaku was crowned winner of the 2015 edition of the Most Beautiful Girl in Nigeria that was held at the Calabar International Convention Centre. She represented Nigeria at the Miss World 2015 pageant held in China.

=== Miss Universe 2016 ===
She represented Nigeria at the Miss Universe 2016 pageant but Unplaced.

Awards and achievements
Preceded by Iheoma Nnadi	Most Beautiful Girl in Nigeria; 2015	Succeeded by Ugochi Ihezue
