= St Andrew's College, Cambridge =

St Andrew's College
- The school crest

Location
- 13 Station Road; Cambridge, Cambridgeshire, CB1 2JB; England; 52.19515°N 0.13212°E

Information
- Type: Private school day & boarding
- Established: 1976
- Department for Education URN: 110932 Tables
- Ofsted: Reports
- Principal: Wayne Marshall
- Gender: Mixed
- Age: 14 to 19
- Enrolment: 133 as of January 2015
- Website: www.standrewscambridge.co.uk

St Andrew's College is a mixed private school and sixth form college located over two sites in Cambridge, Cambridgeshire, England. The school was established in 1976 and was the first independent sixth form college in Cambridge.

The majority of the student body at the school consists of international students wishing to study for entrance into a UK university. However, there are a few British students in attendance at the school. St Andrew's has one teaching campus in Cambridge on Station Road which is near the schools halls of residence.

St Andrew's College offers A Levels and University Foundation Programmes for older students. All students also have access to IELTS training where appropriate.
