= Most Beautiful Girl in Nigeria =

Beauty pageant

MBGN
- Formation: 1986; 40 years ago
- Headquarters: Lagos
- Location: Nigeria
- Members: Miss World; Miss Tourism International; Miss ECOWAS; Miss Africa; Miss Intercontinental
- Official language: English
- Pageant organiser: Silverbird Group
- Website: Official Website

The Most Beautiful Girl in Nigeria – often abbreviated as MBGN – was a pageant organised by Silverbird Group with the main purpose of sending representatives to international competitions. Originally known as Miss Universe Nigeria, it was renamed Most Beautiful Girl in Nigeria after news publishers like Daily Times lost their license to send delegates from rival contest Miss Nigeria to Miss World. As of 2005, the pageant produced multiple representatives, but the MBGN World recipient was considered the overall winner. Miss Universe Nigeria was reestablished in 2023, breaking away from MBGN and operating as an entirely different pageant. In 2024, Miss World Nigeria became a separate pageant in its own right, thus ending the MBGN competition.

The last MBGN titleholder was event planner Ada Eme, who represented Abia.

== History ==
Former publisher Ben Murray-Bruce ventured into show business after his magazine Silverbird flopped. He took a loan of N200,000 from his father which he used to organise a number of concerts which saw artists like Shalamar and Kool and the Gang perform in Nigeria, after which he promoted a new pageant known as Miss Universe Nigeria in 1983 (Omololu Ojehomon was crowned winner but never competed in Miss Universe). Murray-Bruce's pageant only gained public attention after Miss Nigeria Universe metamorphosed into Most Beautiful Girl in Nigeria in 1986, and its first winner was model Lynda Chuba.

MBGN winners were expected to represent Nigeria at Miss World and, until 2004, Miss Universe. Chuba was the first Nigerian representative in twenty-three years of to compete after Edna Park in 1964, while the first MBGN winner at Miss World was English language student Omasan Buwa in 1987. As with most pageants, second-place winners are expected to replace the title-holder if they are unable to complete their reign; in MBGN this has only happened twice – biology student Regina Askia replaced Bianca Onoh after the latter resigned in 1989, while philosophy student Ann Suinner continued Agbani Darego's reign after the latter was crowned Miss World in 2001.

Winners traditionally adopt at least one platform (also known as 'pet project') during their reign – an issue which is of relevance to Nigeria. Once chosen, the winner (and occasionally other finalists) uses their status to address the public about their platform. The most popular was initially Sickle Cell Awareness, but others have included polio, child labour, education, and widow empowerment.

In 2007, Silverbird announced that the pageant would produce four more representatives apart from the winner. The original titles were Miss MBGN Universe (to represent at Miss Universe), MBGN Tourism (Miss Tourism International), and MBGN Ecowas (Miss Ecowas). The fifth title, MBGN Model, which allowed its holder to compete in modelling contests at international level, was briefly dropped and replaced with MBGN Ambassador, with its winner performing ceremonial duties in the country. In 2021, MBGN acquired the Miss Supranational franchise.

The differences between MBGN and Miss Nigeria have been compared with Miss USA and Miss America. While MBGN delegates compete at international level, Miss Nigeria winners no longer have this privilege. In 2010 Miss Nigeria was relaunched as a scholarship programme and its winners in recent years receive modelling contract as part of their prize.

In 2023, Silverbird announced a separate pageant Miss Universe Nigeria would select Nigeria's new Miss Universe representative, breaking away from MBGN.

=== Competition ===
Screening exercises (also known as 'auditions') are held nationwide to select contestants, and successful contestants will be coached on etiquette and stage presence at the boot-camp before competing at the finale, where segments include interview and evening gown, and unlike Miss Nigeria, Swimwear. In the pageant's early days, contestants were allowed to wear one-pieces of their choice for the swimsuit competition. Identical bikinis are now used instead. In 2014, a talent competition was introduced as part of the preliminaries.

In the mid-nineties, after Nigeria yet again failed to place at Miss Universe and Miss World, MBGN organisers placed height and weight restrictions on contestants, and judges were advised not to select the woman they found most attractive, but the contestant with a greater chance of winning at international pageants.

Due to the country's conservative standards, very few contestants competed in the early days of MBGN, and competitors from Northern Nigeria are still rare as its predominantly Muslim population frown on beauty pageants. Guy Murray-Bruce, who succeeded his brother as pageant director in 1992 told The Guardian: "Getting the girls to come and participate was hard, and we literally had to beg them to participate. But since (former Miss World) Agbani [Darego] won it in 2001, we don't beg anyone anymore."

MBGN focuses mainly on physical beauty unlike Miss Nigeria which is expected to promote inner beauty with a wholesome girl-next-door image – as a result its swimsuit competition was famously scrapped in 2010 but this feature remains popular at MBGN.

Prizes for the winner vary each year, but have always included cash; as of 2012, it stands at N3,000,000, and most winners have received cars.

=== Winners ===
MBGN 1988, law student Bianca Onoh, was crowned Miss Africa in 1988, won the congeniality prize at Miss Charm 1988 held in Moscow, and won Miss Intercontinental in 1989, theatre arts graduate Sabina Umeh was the first Nigerian to win the personality prize at Miss World 1990, while Toyin Raji was the recipient in 1995 despite withdrawing from the pageant due to political protests. Prior to this, Raji had been named Miss Congeniality at Miss Universe 1995.

At least three MBGN winners have previously competed in Miss Nigeria: Omasan Buwa (1987), Sylvia Nduka (2010), and Isabella Ayuk (2004) Miss Nigeria 2002, Sylvia Edem, was in the top five at MBGN 1998, as were Miss Nigeria 1993, Pharmacy graduate Janet Fateye, who had competed in MBGN 1992 as Kemi Fateye, and mass communications student Vien Tetsola who was named the "Millennium Queen" in 2000.

Many MBGN winners have pursued careers in entertainment, including Sabina Umeh, Regina Askia, Emma Komlosy, Celia Bissong, and Munachi Nwankwo. Lynda Chuba-Ikpeazu and Omasan Buwa have moved into politics, as has Bianca Onoh who became a presidential adviser, as well as an ambassador and Nigeria's Permanent Representative to the UNWTO while Nike Oshinowo has worked in pageantry.

== International crowns ==
- One Miss World winner: Agbani Darego (2001)
- One Miss Intercontinental winner: Bianca Onoh (1989)
- Two Miss Africa winners:
  - Lynda Chuba (1987)
  - Bianca Onoh (1989)
- Two Miss ECOWAS winners:
  - May Ikeora (2003)
  - Joy Ngozika Obasi (2009)
  - Zirra Banu (2012)

== Titleholders ==
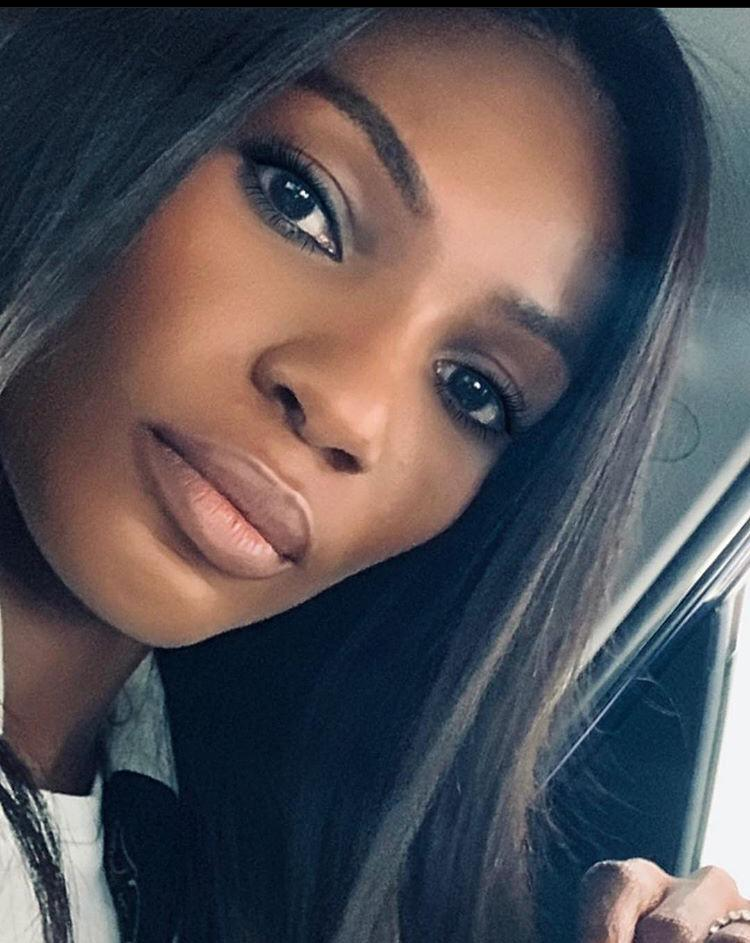
MBGN 2001 Agbani Darego, who achieved Nigeria's only Big Four win at Miss World 2001

=== 1986-2005 ===
Year	MBGN	State / Town Represented
1986	Lynda Chuba-Ikpeazu; Miss Africa 1987	Imo
1987	Omasan Tokunbo Buwa	Warri
1988	Regina Imaobong Askia Usoro	Akwa Ibom
1988	Bianca Odinaka Olivia Onoh; Miss Intercontinental 1989; Miss Africa 1989	Abuja
1990	Sabina Ifeoma Umeh	Niger
1991	Adenike Asabi Oshinowo	Rivers
1992	Sandra Guenefred Petgrave	Akwa Ibom
1993	Rihole Gbinigie	Edo
1994	Susan Hart	Lagos
1995	Toyin Enitan Raji	Kogi
1996	Emma Aret Patricia Komlosy	Bayelsa
1998	Chika Lilian Chikezie	Imo
1999	Angela Ukpoma	Niger
2000	Matilda Nkechiye Kerry	Rivers
2001	Anne Titilope Suinner	Abuja
2001	Ibiagbanidokibubo Asenite Darego; Miss World 2001	Rivers
2002	Chinenye Ivy Ochuba	Anambra
2003	Cecilia Ohumotu Bissong	Cross River
2004	Anita Queen Uwagbele	Edo
2005	Omowunmi Akinnifesi	Kwara

=== 2006 ===
Most Beautiful Girl in Nigeria / MBGN
Year	World	State	Universe	State	Tourism	State
2006	Abiola Bashorun	Lagos	Vanessa Agun	Edo	Alex Tienepre oki	Delta

=== 2007-2019 ===
Most Beautiful Girl in Nigeria / MBGN
Year	World	State	Universe	State	Tourism	State	ECOWAS	State	Model	State
2007	Munachi Gail Theresa Nwankwo	Imo	Ebinabo Potts-Johnson	Bayelsa	Sakana Dikko	Plateau	Erica Ekundaye	Edo	Anire Afejuku	Ogun
2008	Adaeze Stephanie Igwe	Anambra	Stephanie Oforka	Taraba	Ure Obowu	Enugu	Uchechi Ejiogu	Nasarawa	Sandra Idugboe	Edo
2009	Glory Chukwu	Nasarawa	Sandra Otohwo	Delta	Diana Odiaka	Lagos	Joy Ngozika Obasi	Rivers	Ugochi Ogugbue	Imo
2010	Afoma Fiona Amuzie	Plateau	Ngozi Odaloni	Niger	Nengi Warikoko	Rivers	Chinenye Obiora	Ekiti	Lynda Dunkwu	Gombe
2011	Sylvia Nduka	Taraba	Sophie Gemal	Bayelsa	Obioma Isiwu	Enugu	Grace Ndam	Lagos	Jennifer Igwegbe	Gombe
2012	Isabella Agbor Ojong Ayuk *	Cross River	Damiete Charles-Granville *	River	Ifeoma Umeokeke	Abuja	Okafor Nkechinyere	Osun	Joyce Chidebe	Kaduna
2013	Anna Ebiere Banner	Bayelsa	Stephanie Okwu	Imo	Powede Lawrence	Adamawa	Enoma Agboniko	Kaduna	Melissa Devidal	Abuja
2014	Iheoma Amanda Nnadi	Akwa Ibom	Queen Osem Celestine	Edo	Chinyere Adogu	Kwara	Endurance Akpoyiba	Osun	Princess Dennar	Abuja
2015	Unoaku Temitope Anyadike	Anambra	Debbie Collins	Ebonyi	Chizoba Ejike	Abuja	Chikaodili Nna-Udosen	Bauchi	Cynthia Sapara	Edo

=== Notes ===
*Isabella Ayuk—originally MBGN World 2012—was unable to compete at Miss World due to age restrictions and was sent to Miss Universe instead, while runner-up Damiete Charles-Granville—MBGN Universe 2012—represented Nigeria at Miss World.

=== 2017-2019 ===
Most Beautiful Girl in Nigeria / MBGN
Year	World	State	Universe	State	Tourism	State	ECOWAS	State
2017	Ugochi Mitchel Ihezue	Kebbi	Stephanie Agbasi	Sokoto	Winfrey Okolo	Plateau	Emmanuella Yaboh	Oyo
2018	Anita Ukah	Imo	Aramide Oluwatobi Lopez	Lagos	Danielle Jatto	Edo	Valentina Ogbonaya	Sokoto
2019	Nyekachi Esther Douglas	Rivers	Olutosin Itohan Araromi	Taraba	Pamela Ifejoku	Abuja	Akeelah Aminu	Edo

=== 2021-2022 ===
Most Beautiful Girl in Nigeria / MBGN
Year	World	State	Universe	State	Supranational	State	Tourism	State	ECOWAS	State
2021	Oluchi Chioma Madubuike	Abuja	Maristella Chidiogo Okpala	Anambra	Adaeze Chineme	Abia	Odjugo Mercy Jessica	Bayelsa	Lydia Okojie	Bauchi
2022	Ada Agwu Eme	Abia	Montana Onose Felix	Edo	Genevieve Ukatu	Anambra	Ifeoma Uzogheli	Abuja	Lydia Balogun	Lagos

=== 2024-present ===
Most Beautiful Girl in Nigeria / MBGN
Year	World	State	Tourism	State	ECOWAS	State
2024	TBA					

=== Other notable contestants ===
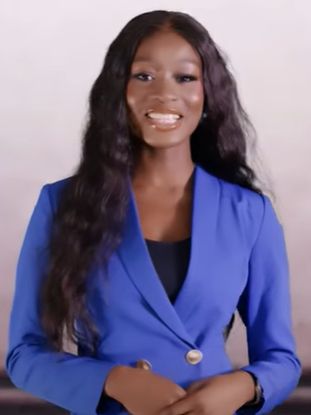
MBGN 2021 finalist Damilola Bolarinde, who later won TNQ 2022

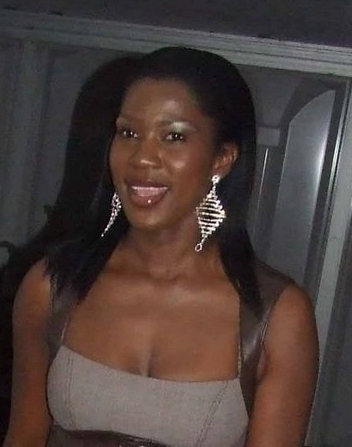
MBGN 2002 finalist Stephanie Okereke, who placed third

- Chidinma Aaron, Miss Nigeria 2018
- Lilian Bach (as Bola Bach), actress
- Kehinde Bankole, model and actress
- Damilola Bolarinde, TNQ 2022
- Sylvia Edem, Miss Nigeria 2002
- Janet Fateye (as Kemi Fateye), singer and Miss Nigeria 1993
- Ibinabo Fiberesima, actress
- Nengi Hampson (as Rebecca Hampson), reality TV personality and TNQ 2013 (b)
- May Ikeora, lawyer, Miss Ecowas 2003 and executive director, Miss Nigeria
- Alex Lopez, actress
- Erica Nlewedim, actress, model, and reality TV personality
- Chikaodili Nna-Udosen, TNQ 2020
- Stephanie Okereke (as Onyekachi Okereke), actress
- Maristella Okpara, Miss Earth Nigeria 2018
- Grace Oboba, actress/producer
- Ebinabo Potts-Johnson, model
- Gloria 'Giomanni' Ziregbe, singer
- Patricia Osita Onumonu, model, fashion designer
- Vien Tetsola, pastor and Miss Nigeria 2000

== Awards ==
The awards most frequently presented at MBGN are Miss Photogenic, Miss Amity, and Best Traditional Costume.

From 2007 to 2012, soft drink marketers La Casera, in conjunction with MBGN, chose a contestant to be the face of their brand. The winner of the title, Miss La Casera, promoted their product and worked on various projects reaching out to society's less privileged. The Miss La Casera winner also received a car and N1,000,000.

== Controversy ==
=== Bianca Onoh ===
In 1989, several months after winning Miss Intercontinental, Bianca Onoh resigned after tabloids exposed her secret relationship with former Biafran leader and Ikemba of Nnewi, Chukwuemeka Odumegwu Ojukwu, a political associate of her father over thirty years her senior, sparking outrageous rumors – Climax magazine falsely claimed Onoh was pregnant. Although the couple never confirmed the relationship until their wedding in 1994, pageant organisers Silverbird were furious as MBGN title-holders are said to be discouraged from high-profile relationships during their tenure. Onoh later stated that the pressure of performing her duties as a pageant queen was unbearable, which explained her decision to hand over her crown to second-place winner Regina Askia who completed the remainder of Onoh's tenure as MBGN.

=== Sabina Umeh ===
MBGN 1990 Sabina Umeh was the subject of controversy following allegations that her then-boyfriend/now-husband Kesse Jabari, who worked in client services for Silverbird, had influenced the judging process in her favour. Jabari, who later found fame in fashion and Nollywood, denied the allegations, stating that the judging panel consisted of respected individuals who made their decisions independently. He also noted that contestants were assessed on a range of criteria rather than physical appearance alone. Umeh likewise rejected the claims, pointing out that she had previously competed in the 1987 edition of the pageant whilst in a relationship with Jabari and did not place.

=== Nike Oshinowo ===
In a 1992 interview with Vintage People, MBGN 1991 winner Nike Oshinowo, criticised the pageant's poor management, inadequate accommodation, theft among contestants, and an unfriendly atmosphere from other competitors. She also accused organiser Ben Murray-Bruce of failing to treat his titleholders with sufficient respect, prompting her to withdraw from various international pageants and modelling contests apart from Miss World; her MBGN first runner-up, Tonia Okogbenin, competed at Miss Universe in her place.

=== Ibinabo Fiberesima ===
Actress Ibinabo Fiberesima, who competed in 1991, has claimed in numerous interviews that she had competed in 1998 and emerged second runner-up, but this statement is questionable as the person who had actually placed third was International Relations student Sylvia Edem, who would later win Miss Nigeria in 2002.

=== MBGN vs Miss Nigeria Lawsuit ===
Shortly after Agbani Darego's victory at Miss World, Miss Nigeria 2001 Amina Ekpo took legal action against her MBGN counterpart whom she accused of misrepresentation, stating that Darego had fraudulently presented herself as "Miss Nigeria" at the international pageant, and had not been authorised to use the title. Former Daily Times managing director Onukaba Adinoyi Ojo, who had famously described MBGN winners as "lowly-rated queens" at the Miss Nigeria 2001 grand finale, supported the $10,000,000 lawsuit, claiming "We will do everything possible to make sure we prevent people from tampering with a patented pageant like Miss Nigeria, [and] will not allow anybody to misrepresent us."

=== Sylvia Nduka ===
In 2011, controversy followed Sylvia Nduka’s MBGN win when judges claimed the announced result did not reflect their choice. Nduka said she struggled during the interview because MBGN was her first pageant, but videos later showed she had competed in Miss Nigeria 2010 and received etiquette and media training. Reports also alleged she reacted angrily after failing to reach the final ten. Silverbird defended her, attributing her poor interview performance to nerves and dismissing criticism of her victory.

=== Isabella Ayuk ===
2012 winner Isabella Ayuk claimed to be twenty-six when she competed, until reports suggested that she had forged her age, thus giving the impression that she was younger than her actual years (she was said to be thirty). Despite a public outcry, pageant director Guy Murray-Bruce stated that Ayuk would not be dethroned and will continue to serve as the reigning queen. However, due to age restrictions, she did not represent Nigeria at Miss World that year.

== Titleholders under MBGN ==
=== MBGN Universe ===
- : Declared as Winner
- : Ended as runner-up or top 5/6 qualification
- : Ended as one of the finalists or semifinalists
- : Ended as special awards winner

The MBGN Universe represents her country at the Miss Universe pageant. Before 2005, MBGN winners represented Nigeria at both Miss Universe and Miss World. On occasion, when the official representative failed to qualify due to age restrictions or was unavailable, runners-up were sent instead.

In 2023, MBGN Universe was replaced with Miss Universe Nigeria, breaking ties with MBGN.

Year	State	MBGN Universe	Placement at Miss Universe	Special Awards
2022	Edo	Hannah Iribhogbe	Unplaced	
2021	Anambra	Maristella Okpala	Unplaced	Best National Costume
2020	Due to the impact of COVID-19 pandemic, no representative in 2020			
2019	Taraba	Olutosin Araromi	Top 20	
2018	Lagos	Aramide Lopez	Unplaced	
2017	Sokoto	Stephanie Agbasi	Unplaced	
2016	Anambra	Unoaku Anyadike	Unplaced	
2015	Ebonyi	Debbie Collins	Unplaced	
2014	Edo	Queen Osem Celestine	Unplaced	Miss Congeniality
2013	Imo	Stephanie Okwu	Unplaced	
2012	Cross River	Isabella Ayuk	Unplaced	
2011	Bayelsa	Sophie Gemal	Unplaced	Best National Costume (8th Runner-up)
2010	Niger	Ngozi Odaloni	Unplaced	
2009	Delta	Sandra Otohwo	Unplaced	
2008	Taraba	Stephanie Oforka	Unplaced	
2007	Bayelsa	Ebinabo Potts-Johnson	Unplaced	
2006	Delta	Tienepre Alexandra Oki	Unplaced	
2005	Lagos	Roseline Amusu	Unplaced	
Most Beautiful Girl in Nigeria (MBGN)
2004	Benin City	Anita Uwagbale	Unplaced	
2003	Cross River	Celia Bissong	Unplaced	
2002	Anambra	Chinenye Ochuba	Unplaced	
2001	Rivers	Agbani Darego	Top 10	
2000	Rivers	Matilda Kerry	Unplaced	
1999	Imo	Angela Ukpoma	Unplaced	
1998	Imo	Chika Chikezie	Unplaced	
Did not compete between 1996—1997
1995	Kogi	Toyin Raji	Unplaced	Miss Congeniality
1994	Benue	Susan Hart	Unplaced	
1993	Lagos	Rihole Gbinigie	Unplaced	
1992	Akwa Ibom	Sandra Petgrave	Unplaced	
1991	Lagos	Tonia Okogbenin	Unplaced	
1990	Niger	Sabina Umeh	Unplaced	
1989	Abuja	Bianca Onoh	Unplaced	
1988	Warri	Omasan Buwa	Unplaced	
1987	Imo	Lynda Chuba-Ikpeazu	Unplaced	

=== Most Beautiful Girl in Nigeria World ===
- : Declared as Winner
- : Ended as runner-up or top 5/6 qualification
- : Ended as one of the finalists or semifinalists
- : Ended as special awards winner

The MBGN World titleholder represents her country at the Miss World pageant. Before MBGN, Miss World Nigeria sent their second-place winner Gina Onyejiaka, to Miss World 1963. Miss Nigeria, the official national pageant, held the franchise from 1964 to 1986 until MBGN took over the franchise. On occasion, when the winner does not qualify (due to age), a runner-up is sent.

Year	State	MBGN World	Placement at Miss World	Special Awards
2026	Rivers	Tamunosoye Karibi-George	Top 12	
2025	Osun	Raimi Joy	Top 20	
2023	Abia	Ada Eme	Top 40	Head-to-Head Challenge
2022	Miss World 2021 was rescheduled to 16 March 2022 due to the COVID-19 pandemic outbreak in Puerto Rico, no edition started in 2022			
2021	Abuja	Oluchi Madubuike	Unplaced	Miss World Sport (Top 32)
2020	Due to the impact of COVID-19 pandemic, no competition held			
2019	Rivers	Nyekachi Douglas	Top 5	Miss World Africa; Miss World Top Model; Head-to-Head Challenge; Miss World Sport (1st Runner-up)'; Beauty With A Purpose (Top 10); Miss World Talent (Top 27)
2018	Imo	Anita Ukah	Top 30	
2017	Kebbi	Ugochi Ihezue	Top 15	Miss World Top Model
2016	Ebonyi	Debbie Collins	Unplaced	
2015	Anambra	Unoaku Anyadike	Unplaced	
2014	Akwa Ibom	Iheoma Nnadi	Unplaced	
2013	Bayelsa	Anna Banner	Unplaced	
2012	Rivers	Damiete Granville	Top 30	
2011	Taraba	Sylvia Nduka	Unplaced	
2010	Plateau	Fiona Aforma Amuzie	Unplaced	
2009	Nasarawa	Glory Chukwu	Unplaced	
2008	Anambra	Adaeze Igwe	Unplaced	
2007	Imo	Munachi Nwankwo	Unplaced	
2006	Lagos	Abiola Bashorun	Unplaced	
2005	Kwara	Omowunmi Akinnifesi	Unplaced	
Most Beautiful Girl in Nigeria (MBGN)
2004	Benin City	Anita Uwagbale	Top 15	Miss World Africa
2003	Cross River	Celia Bissong	Unplaced	
2002	Anambra	Chinenye Ochuba	Top 10	Miss World Africa
2001	Rivers	Agbani Darego	Miss World 2001	Miss World Africa
2000	Rivers	Matilda Kerry	Unplaced	
1999	Imo	Angela Ukpoma	Unplaced	
1998	Imo	Chika Chikezie	Unplaced	
1997	Did not compete			
1996	Bayelsa	Emma Komlosy	Unplaced	
1995	Did not compete			
1994	Benue	Susan Hart	Unplaced	
1993	Lagos	Rihole Gbinigie	Unplaced	
1992	Akwa Ibom	Sandra Petgrave	Unplaced	
1991	Rivers	Nike Oshinowo	Unplaced	
1990	Niger	Sabina Umeh	Unplaced	
1989	Abuja	Bianca Onoh	Unplaced	
1988	Warri	Omasan Buwa	Unplaced	
1987	—	Mary Ngazi Bienoseh	Top 15	Miss World Africa

=== MBGN Supranational ===
- : Declared as Winner
- : Ended as runner-up
- : Ended as one of the finalists or semifinalists
- : Ended as special awards winner

The MBGN Supranational represents her country at the Miss Supranational pageant. As of 2023, Miss Supranational representatives are selected at Miss Universe Nigeria.

Year	State	MBGN Supranational	Placement at Miss Supranational	Special Awards
2022	Abia	Adaeze Chineme	Unplaced	
2021	Edo	Akeelah Aminu	Unplaced	

== See also ==
- Miss Nigeria
- The Nigerian Queen
- Mr Nigeria
