= Aret Komlosy =

British singer/songwriter, actress, model, and producer

- Born: Emma Komlosy
- Other name: Aret Kapetanovic
- Beauty pageant titleholder
- Title: MBGN 1996
- Website: aretmusic.com

Emma Aret Patricia Komlosy is a British-Nigerian singer, songwriter, actress, model, producer and beauty pageant titleholder.

== Early life ==
The daughter of entertainer Patti Boulaye and entertainment manager Stephen Komlosy, Komlosy was raised in the United Kingdom, but briefly lived in Nigeria with her grandmother. As a child, she was a British Junior Backstroke Champion. In 1996, while on holiday in Nigeria, Komlosy became the first mixed-race winner of Most Beautiful Girl in Nigeria (her father is of Hungarian descent) and represented Nigeria at Miss World in India. As no MBGN contest was held in 1997, Komlosy held the title for nearly two years.

== Career ==
After obtaining a Law degree from the University of Westminster in 2003, Komlosy ventured into show business. She briefly worked for her mother as a back-up singer before co-producing the musical Sundance. In 2005, she was signed to Sony BMG as a singer/songwriter, and wrote and performed several songs, including "Into the Blue", which was used in the film Silence Becomes You, in which she had a cameo, and "Disconnected", which was recorded by Will Young. Prior to this, she had a modelling deal with Premier Model Management, and worked in fashion shows, music videos, and commercials. She has since featured in some low-budget movies, including The Sea Change and Solomon with Ben Cross, and sung with dance act Glide and Swerve.

In 2013, Komlosy - credited as Aret Kapetanovic - was a contestant on The Voice UK, but was not picked by the judges.

== Personal life ==
Komlosy is a charity worker, and was event manager/organiser at concerts held by her mother's charity, Support for Africa, and a charity event at the Hackney Empire. She has two children.
