= Lynda Chuba-Ikpeazu =

Nigerian politician and model

Personal details
- Born: 22 June 1966 (age 60)
- Profession: Politician, model

Lynda Chuba-Ikpeazu, also known as Lynda Chuba (born 22 June 1966), is a Nigerian politician, lawyer, model and beauty pageant titleholder. She gained prominence as the first winner of Most Beautiful Girl in Nigeria in 1986. She is the daughter of Chuba Ikpeazu, a former chief justice and two-time Nigeria Football Association chairman. She is one of 11 female members of the 360 member House of Representatives.

== Early life and education ==
Chuba-Ikpeazu attended Federal Government College, Enugu and holds a bachelor's degree in communication and a master's degree in business administration from the University of California, Los Angeles. She also holds a bachelor's degree in law. Chuba-Ikpeazu received her education in Nigeria, England, and the United States, where she worked part-time as a model.

== Pageants ==
In 1986, while on vacation in Lagos, Chuba-Ikpeazu won the first Most Beautiful Girl in Nigeria pageant. In 1987, she was the first Nigerian representative at Miss Universe since Edna Park in 1964, and was later crowned Miss Africa the same year.

After her reign, Chuba-Ikpeazu became a businesswoman in Lagos State, specialising in oil servicing.

== Political career ==
Chuba-Ikpeazu was a member of the House of Representatives from 1999 to 2003. In 2004, Chuba-Ikpeazu won the Nigerian National Assembly election, representing Onitsha North-South Federal Constituency, Anambra State, as a candidate of the People's Democratic Party (PDP). She served as the Chair, House Committee on Maritime Safety and Education.

She is a member of the board of directors of Anambra United.

Preceded by none (inaugural winner)	Most Beautiful Girl in Nigeria; 1986	Succeeded by Omasan Buwa
