= Damiete Charles Granville =

Nigerian model (born 1988)

- Born: Damiete Charles Granville; 1988 (age 37–38); Rivers State, Nigeria
- Height: 1.75 m (5 ft 9 in)
- Beauty pageant titleholder
- Title: MBGN World 2012
- Hair color: Black
- Eye color: Brown
- Major competitions: Most Beautiful Girl in Nigeria 2012 (1st runner-up); Miss World 2012 (Top 30)

Damiete Charles Granville (born 1988) is a Nigerian model and beauty pageant titleholder who was crowned MBGN Universe 2012 and represented Nigeria in the 2012 Miss World pageant. She is also a former Miss Fresh Africa 2009.

== Most Beautiful Girl in Nigeria 2012 ==
Competing as Miss Rivers, Damiete placed in 1st runner-up at MGBN 2012 title at the grand finale held at the Best Western Hotel in Benin City, Edo State on Saturday, 5th May 2012.
