= Agbani Darego =

Nigerian model and beauty queen

Agbani Darego MFR
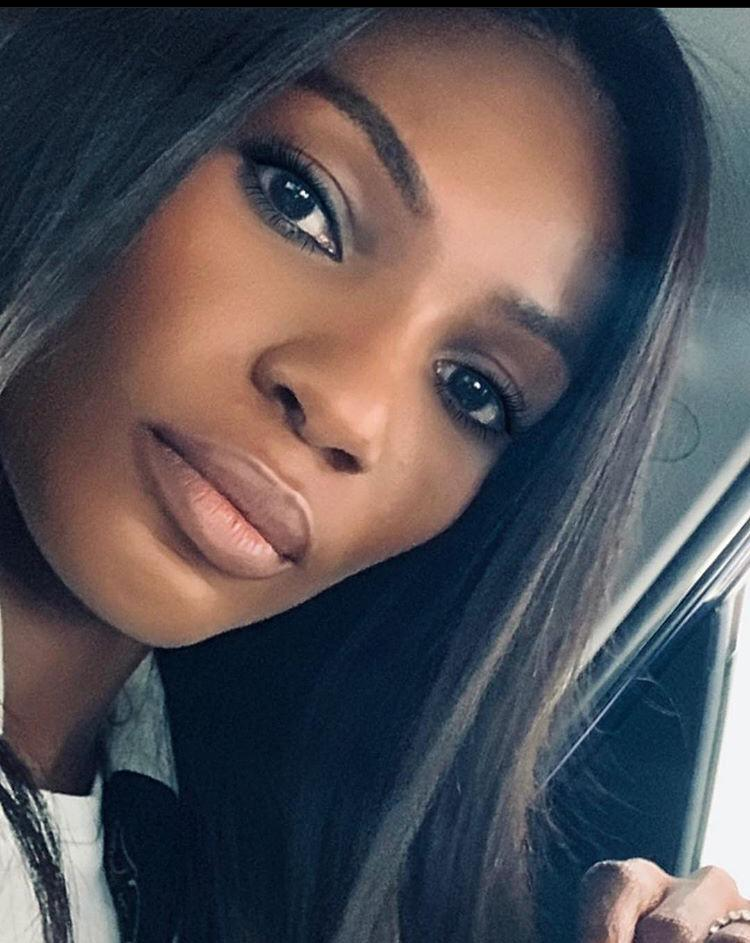
- Agbani Darego, Miss World 2001
- Born: 22 December 1982 (age 43); Lagos, Nigeria
- Other names: A.D, Agbani Darego
- Education: Bereton Montessori Nursery and Primary School; Federal Government Girls' College, Abuloma
- Alma mater: New York University
- Spouse: Ishaya Danjuma (m. 2017)
- Children: 2
- Beauty pageant titleholder
- Title: Most Beautiful Girl in Nigeria 2001; Miss World 2001
- Hair color: Black
- Eye color: Brown
- Major competitions: Most Beautiful Girl in Nigeria 2001; (Winner); Miss Universe 2001; (Top 10); Miss World 2001; (Winner); (Miss World Africa)
- Website: http://agbanidarego.com/

Chief Ibiagbanidokibubo Asenite 'Agbani' Darego, MFR (born 22 December 1982) is a Nigerian model and beauty queen who was crowned Miss World 2001. She was the first black African, the fourth African overall, and the third one to win the title outright (i.e. without benefitting from resignations of higher-ranked contestants, and without dethronements).

== Early life ==
Abonnema-native, Darego was born in Lagos to a family as the sixth of eight children. At age two, her family relocated to Port Harcourt where she was raised in D-Line. Darego attended Bereton Montessori Nursery and Primary School, and at ten was sent to boarding school in a bid to shield her from her mother who battled breast cancer. Her mother, Inaewo, owned a rice trading business and a clothing boutique, but died two years after her daughter's move to boarding school. Darego has spoken of how the loss prepared her for tough challenges in the future. As a teenager, Darego longed to be a model, and auditioned for the M-Net Face of Africa modelling competition despite her conservative father's wishes, but was not chosen as a finalist. Darego attended Federal Government Girls' College, Abuloma. Upon completing her secondary education she attended University of Port Harcourt where she studied Computer Science and Mathematics.

== Pageantry ==
In 2001, Darego was crowned Most Beautiful Girl in Nigeria. Contrary to popular belief, Darego did not replace Valerie Peterside after the latter was dethroned; Peterside had competed in rival pageant Miss Nigeria. A few months later Darego was a contestant at Miss Universe, and became the first Nigerian to place among the top 10 semi-finalists, finishing seventh overall. She was the only top ten contestant to wear a modest maillot as opposed to a revealing bikini during the swimsuit competition.

In November that year, she became the first Indigenous African to claim the Miss World title (past winners Penelope Coelen and Anneline Kriel, both of South Africa, are of European descent, and Antigone Costanda, who represented Egypt in 1954 is of Greek heritage). Darego's victory was widely welcomed in her home country, and her one-year tenure included goodwill trips and scheduled appearances on behalf of the pageant, and an MFR.

== Modelling ==
Prior to winning MBGN, Darego featured in print commercials for boutique chain Collectables. After Miss Universe she was invited by Naomi Campbell to participate in Frock 'n' Roll, a charity fashion show in Barcelona, and soon negotiated a modelling deal with Trump Model Management in America. Shortly after her reign as Miss World she was represented by London and Paris branches of Next Model Management and landed a three-year contract with L'Oréal, becoming only the second Black model to accomplish this feat after Vanessa Williams, and was photographed by Annie Leibovitz, a big name in Americans portrait photograph sphere for Vogue. Other brands she has modelled for include Avon, Christian Dior, Sephora, Target, and Macy's. Darego has also appeared in Elle, Marie Claire, Allure, Trace, Stitch, Cosmopolitan, and Essence magazines, working with numerous designers including Oscar de la Renta, Marc Bouwer, Tommy Hillfiger, Ralph Lauren, and Gianfranco Ferre.

In her homeland Darego has appeared in advertising campaigns for hair care brand Gentle Touch with model Oluchi, and served as the face of Arik Air. She has also graced the covers of Complete Fashion, Mania, ThisDay Style, Genevieve, True Love, and TW Magazine.

== Other work ==
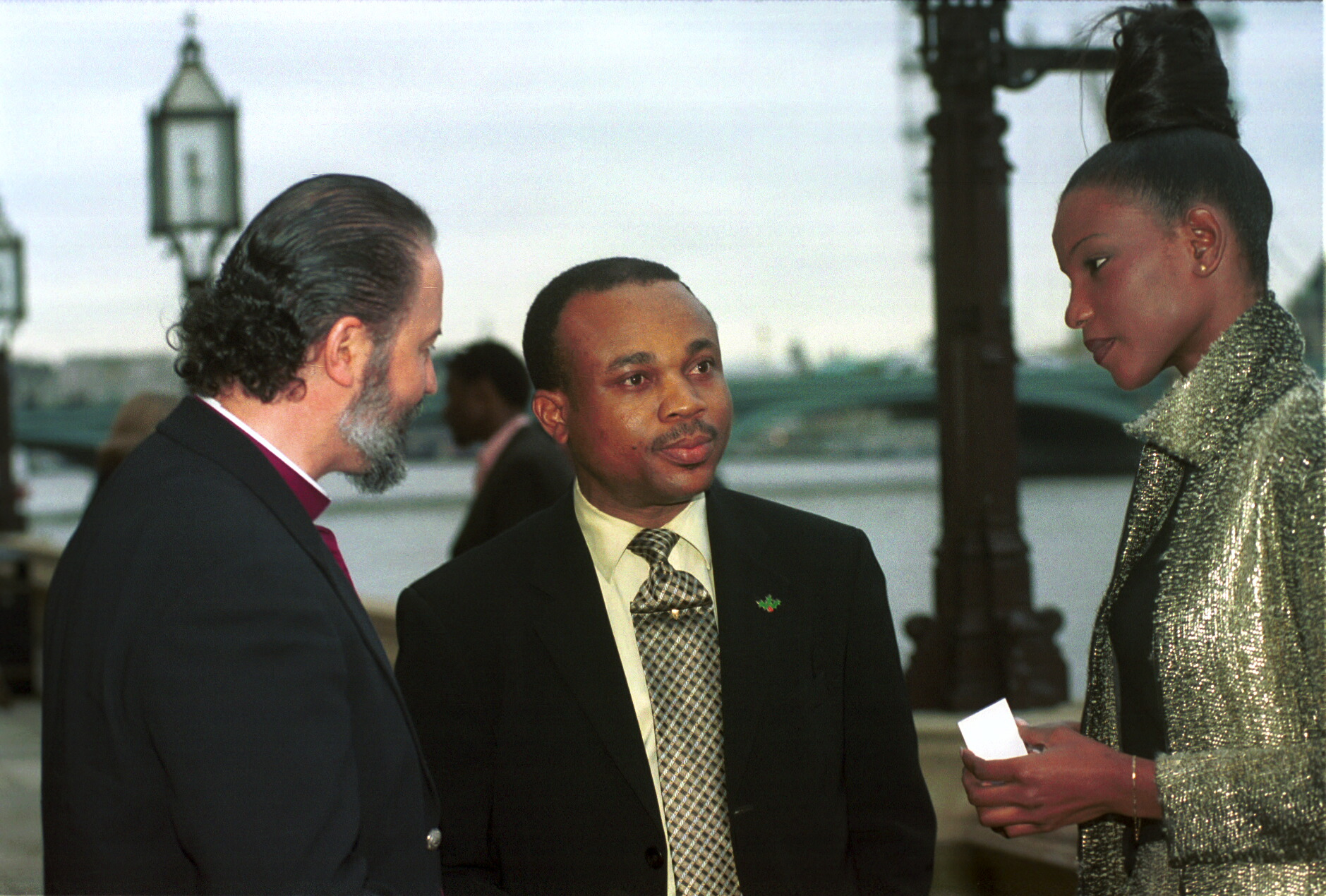
Agbani Darego pictured by Michael Spafford at the House of Commons in 2001

Darego has judged numerous pageant, fashion and modelling competitions including Miss World 2014, Miss England 2002, Mr. Scotland 2002, and Elite Model Look Nigeria 2012 and 2014. In 2010, she launched a style and fashion reality show Stylogenic on Nigerian television, and three years later announced her denim range, AD by Agbani Darego, which includes jeans, dresses, sunglasses and bags.

== Personal life ==
In the aftermath of her win in 2001, Darego was awarded an honorary chieftaincy by the Council of Chiefs of Lagos. At the time of her investiture, she was one of the youngest chiefs in the country.

Due to her busy work schedule, Darego left the University of Port Harcourt, but after moving to New York where she was signed to Next Model Management, Ford Models, and Trump Models, she enrolled with New York University to study Psychology, graduating in May 2012.

In April 2017, Darego married her longtime partner Ishaya Danjuma, son of billionaire General Theophilus Yakubu Danjuma, in a ceremony held in Marrakesh. Together they have a son who was born in September 2018, and welcomed another child in December 2020.

Awards and achievements
Preceded by (India) Priyanka Chopra	Miss World; 2001	Succeeded by (Turkey) Azra Akın
Preceded by Matilda Kerry	Most Beautiful Girl in Nigeria; 2001	Succeeded by Ann Suinner
