= Nike Oshinowo =

Nigerian talk show host (born 1966)

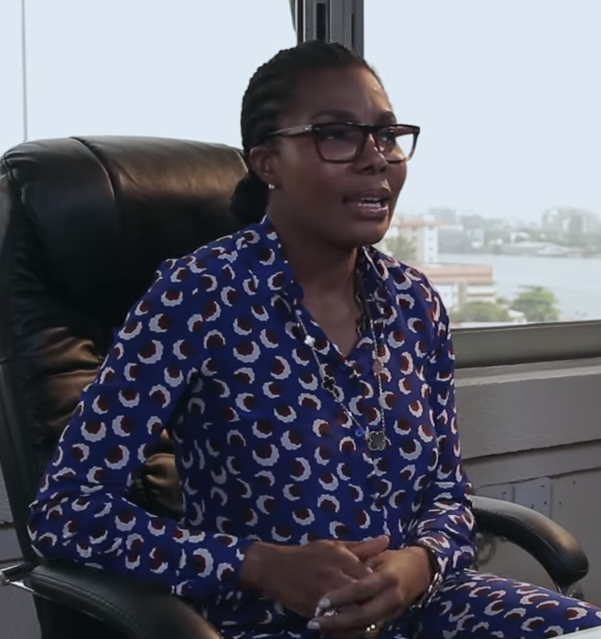
- Born: Adenike Asabi Oshinowo
- Beauty pageant titleholder
- Title: MBGN 1991
- Hair colour: Brown
- Eye colour: Brown
- Major competition: Most Beautiful Girl in Nigeria 1991
- Website: nikeoshinowo.com.ng

Nike Oshinowo (born Adenike Asabi Oshinowo, 1966) is a Nigerian entrepreneur, TV host and former beauty pageant titleholder.

== Early life and pageants ==
Oshinowo was raised in Ibadan and England, where she attended boarding school. Although she had intended to become an air hostess or a doctor, she studied Politics at the University of Essex. Shortly after obtaining her degree, Oshinowo, mentored by former Miss Nigeria Helen Prest, represented Rivers at the Most Beautiful Girl in Nigeria pageant and became its first Yoruba winner (She was crowned in 1990, but reigned through 1991). Her victory attracted controversy from the audience and showbiz journalists following rumours the contest was rigged in her favor until Oshinowo denied in an interview that Prest had a hand in her MBGN victory.

In 1991, Oshinowo, then representing Nigeria at Miss World, criticised her South African counterpart, Diana Tilden-Davis, after the latter reportedly made derogatory remarks regarding black women. According to The Sowetan, Oshinowo had overheard Tilden-Davis state that native South Africans were absent from her country's national pageant due to their high teen pregnancy rate. Miss World officials banned Tilden-Davis, who subsequently placed third in the contest that year, from arguing against the accusation, dismissing the report as a rumour.

In a 1992 interview with Vintage People, Oshinowo criticised MBGN's poor management, inadequate accommodation, theft among contestants, and an unfriendly atmosphere from other competitors. She also accused organiser Ben Murray-Bruce of failing to treat his titleholders with sufficient respect, prompting her to withdraw from Miss Universe; her MBGN first runner-up, Tonia Okogbenin, competed in her place.

== Career ==
After her reign as MBGN, Oshinowo featured in a commercial for the Venus de Milo beauty range, and hosted a fashion and beauty show on Nigerian television. Her business ventures included African food delivery service Buka Express, and health and beauty day spa Skin Deep which ran for seven years before it was sold after she decided to create her own range of beauty products for the Nigerian market. On January 17, 2010, she released the workout video Nike Oshinowo: Fit, Forty and Fabulous - the first celebrity fitness DVD produced in the country - and launched her own fragrance Asabi.

In 2010, after a six-year attempt, Oshinowo finally bought the Miss Nigeria franchise from former organisers Daily Times, and became chief executive and creative director of the pageant from 2010 to 2012. In 2013, Oshinowo launched the Centenary Pageant, with the winner reigning for a hundred years.

In 2014, Oshinowo launched her talk show Late Night with Nike Oshinowo on AIT.

== Personal life ==
Oshinowo, who speaks five languages (English, French, Japanese, Spanish, and her native Yoruba), married medical doctor Tunde Soleye in 2006, but is now divorced. In 2009, the couple were in the news following a lawsuit instituted by Soleye's ex-wife Funmilayo, who claimed that he had been unfaithful with Oshinowo during their marriage.

In 2013, Oshinowo spoke of her struggle with endometriosis which had plagued her since boarding school at age 13, and at the age of 47 she became the mother of twins via surrogacy in America.
