= Bianca Odumegwu-Ojukwu =

Nigerian businesswoman and lawyer (born 1968)

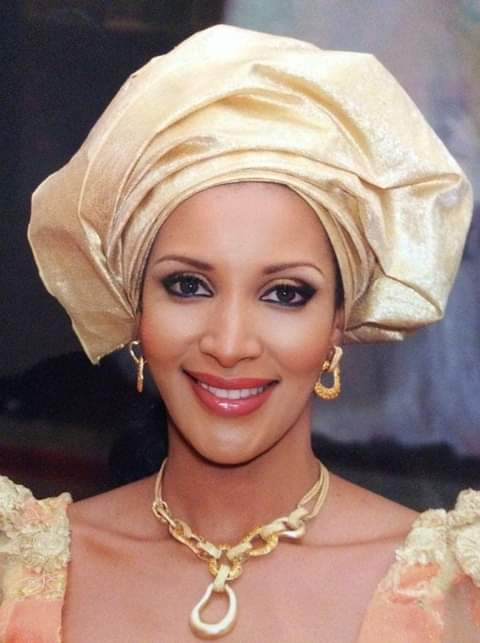

Minister of Foreign Affairs
- Incumbent
- Assumed office 30 March 2026
- President: Bola Tinubu
- Preceded by: Yusuf Tuggar

Minister of State for Foreign Affairs
- In office 4 November 2024 – 30 March 2026
- President: Bola Tinubu
- Succeeded by: Sola Enikanolaye

Permanent Representative of Nigeria to the United Nations World Tourism Organization
- Incumbent
- Assumed office 4 November 2024

Personal details
- Born: Bianca Odinakachukwu Onoh; 5 August 1968 (age 58) Ngwo, Biafra (now Ngwo, Nigeria)
- Spouse: Emeka Odumegwu-Ojukwu (m. 1994; died 2011)
- Education: University of Buckingham; University of Nigeria; Nigerian Law School; Alfonso X El Sabio University
- Beauty pageant titleholder
- Title: Most Beautiful Girl in Nigeria 1988; Miss Africa 1988; Miss Intercontinental 1989
- Major competitions: Most Beautiful Girl in Nigeria 1988; Miss Africa 1988; Miss Intercontinental 1989

Bianca Odinakachukwu Olivia Odumegwu-Ojukwu (née Onoh; born 5 August 1968) is a Nigerian politician, diplomat, lawyer, businesswoman and beauty pageant titleholder. She currently serves as the Minister of Foreign Affairs. The widow of Biafra President Chukwuemeka Odumegwu Ojukwu, she is a multiple international pageant titleholder, having won Most Beautiful Girl in Nigeria, Miss Africa, and Miss Intercontinental. Formerly a presidential advisor, she was the country's ambassador to Ghana and became Nigeria's Ambassador to Spain in 2012. She is also Nigeria's Permanent Representative to the United Nations World Tourism Organization (UNWTO). She was previously Minister of State, Foreign Affairs, after being sworn-in on 4 November 2024.

== Early life and education ==
The sixth child of former Anambra State Governor Christian Onoh and his wife Carol, a college principal, Bianca Onoh spent most of her childhood in rural Ngwo with her siblings Lilian, Josephine, Nuzo, Gabriel, Stella, Christian and Josef. She attended Ackworth School, Pontefract, St Andrews College, Cambridge, and Cambridge Tutorial College where she obtained her A-levels. She soon began a combined honours degree in Politics, Economics and Law at the University of Buckingham, but transferred to the University of Nigeria, Nsukka after her father, a lawyer by profession, insisted she concentrated solely on Law and join the family business. Following graduation, Odumegwu-Ojukwu attended the Nigerian Law School which eventually led to her call to the bar.

=== Early career ===
After Law School, Bianca, briefly practised the profession before quitting to divide her time between her home, her cosmetics business Bianca Blend and her interior decorating outfit Mirabella. Despite her reservations regarding modelling, Bianca Onoh fronted print commercials for her brand. She also established the non-government organisation Hope House Trust, centered towards rehabilitating juvenile offenders in Enugu. Bianca is a Diplomat, Lawyer, Business woman, Beauty Pageant Titleholder and an International pageant holder. She is also Chairman of the Mayrock Memorial Foundation.

=== Pageantry ===
In December 1988, Odumegwu-Ojukwu, who had previously emerged winner at Miss Martini, in her teens in England, contested in, and was crowned Most Beautiful Girl in Nigeria, but reigned through most of 1989. She also won the Miss Africa 1989 pageant held in Gambia before representing her country at both Miss World in Hong Kong and Miss Universe in Mexico. She became the first African to win Miss Intercontinental that same year, and was named Miss Congeniality at Miss Charm in Russia where she was also a semi-finalist. She won the global Miss Intercontinental pageant.

=== Diplomacy ===
In 2011, Bianca Odumegwu-Ojukwu was appointed Senior Special Assistant on Diaspora Affairs by President Goodluck Jonathan; in 2012 she became Nigeria's Ambassador to Ghana and later Ambassador to the Kingdom Of Spain. In 2016, Odumegwu-Ojukwu received a master's degree in International Relations and Diplomacy from Alfonso X el Sabio University in Spain. She also holds a Diploma in Human Rights and International Relations from the Berg Institute as well as a Diploma in Dynamics of Conflict and Cooperation from the University for Peace, Costa Rica. She is Nigeria's permanent representative to the United Nations World Tourism Organization. On 23 October 2024 President Bola Ahmed Tinubu reshuffled his cabinet and appointed Ojukwu as Minister of State for Foreign Affairs.

She was appointed as the Minister of State for Foreign Affairs on Wednesday October 23, 2024 by President Tinubu. She is formerly a Presidential Advisor. She is a principal member of the Board of Trustees of the All Progressives Grand Alliance (APGA). The Political Party was founded by her late husband. It has maintained Political Power in Anambra State for over 20 years.

== Controversies ==
In 1989, halfway through her reign as Most Beautiful Girl in Nigeria, Odumegwu-Ojukwu began a relationship with Biafra president Chukwuemeka Odumegwu Ojukwu, a political associate of her father's, over thirty years her senior. Their controversial romance was a national talking point in the early 1990s. The immense pressure

of being under the public eye became increasingly unbearable, causing her to resign as Miss Intercontinental as her main concern was completing her education as a law student. In 1994, having finally obtained her degree, she married the former Biafra president, Chukwuemeka Odumegwu Ojukwu in a lavish wedding ceremony held in Abuja, the capital of Nigeria.

In 2012, following the death of her husband, his will, which left most of his assets to her, generated a great deal of controversy and disaffection among several family members, Bianca Odumegwu-Ojukwu appealed to her critics to allow Odumegwu-Ojukwu to "rest in peace", describing him as a man of honour and integrity whose legacy should not be obscured by rancour over inheritance issues and stating that the will was drafted in 2005, registered and placed in the custody of the State Probate Registry with the legal witnesses and executors, who were present at the time it was prepared, still living. In 2023, she won her legal battle over the Ojukwu estate.

== Personal life ==
She was in a relationship with her husband from 1989 and they married on 12 November 1994 in a lavish wedding ceremony in Abuja. Bianca was 27 while Emeka was in his 60s.

After almost 17 years of marriage, her husband Emeka died in the United Kingdom after a brief illness at 78 in 2011. The couple had three children together: Chineme, Afamefuna, and Nwachukwu. Of her marriage, she admits that while she was happy to have found her husband, she would not encourage her daughter to make a similar choice of marital engagement. Odumegwu-Ojukwu holds many traditional titles in her native land as well as the highest chieftaincy title conferred on women in her region. Her sister, Lilian Onoh was Nigeria's Ambassador to the Republic of Namibia.

== Awards ==
Bianca Odumegwu-Ojukwu was honoured with the Certificate of Merit by El Mundo Diplomatico for her efforts towards providing effective platforms for constructive engagement between Nigeria and Spain, and was voted Africa's Outstanding Ambassador by Dutch magazine The Voice in 2014. She was also honored with the "Ambassador of Excellence" Award by the Government of Anambra State, Nigeria at its Silver Jubilee commemoration in 2016. She is a member of the Board of Trustees of the All Progressives Grand Alliance, the Political Party that was founded by her late husband Chukwuemeka Odumegwu-Ojukwu and which has maintained political power in Anambra State for over a decade. Her bid to represent her senatorial district in 2018 was stalled as a result of irregularities which occurred during her party's primary elections. She is presently the secretary of the Truth, Justice and Peace Commission set up in 2022 to investigate the root causes of violence, insecurity and separatist agitations in South-Eastern Nigeria as well as a member of the Governing Council of Chukwuemeka Odumegwu Ojukwu University (COOU), named after her husband, and also a member of the Governing Board of Christian Chukwuma Onoh College of Education (CCOCE), founded in honor of her father.
