= Iheoma Nnadi =

Nigerian beauty pageant (born 1984)

- Born: Iheoma Amanda Nnadi; 15 May 1984 (age 42)
- Occupation: Entrepreneur
- Height: 1.78 m (5 ft 10 in)
- Spouse: Emmanuel Emenike
- Beauty pageant titleholder
- Hair color: Dark brown
- Eye color: Brown
- Major competitions: Most Beautiful Girl in Nigeria 2014 (Winner); Miss World 2014 (Unplaced)

Iheoma Amanda Nnadi // is a Nigerian beauty pageant titleholder who was crowned Most Beautiful Girl in Nigeria 2014. She represented Akwa Ibom State, south-south Nigeria and represented Nigeria in the Miss World 2014 contest but Unplaced. She came from the Igbo tribe in Nigeria.

== Early life and education ==
Born 15 May 1995. Iheoma originally hails from Owerri, Imo State, Nigeria.

== Personal life ==
After her reign as beauty queen, at 23 years Nnadi relocated to Turkey where her fiancé, footballer Emmanuel Emenike, plied his trade instead of going back to her base South Africa. She married Emenike. They once had a marriage crisis and a potential divorce but settled in the end. They have two children. Iheoma gave birth to her daughter in a British Hospital.
