= Miss Venezuela 1996 =

43rd edition of the Miss Venezuela competition

- Date: September 6, 1996
- Presenters: Gilberto Correa; Bárbara Palacios
- Entertainment: Patricia Manterola
- Venue: Poliedro de Caracas, Caracas, Venezuela
- Broadcaster: Venevision
- Entrants: 28
- Placements: 8
- Winner: Marena Bencomo; Carabobo
- Congeniality: Michelina Nuzzo; Trujillo
- Photogenic: Consuelo Adler; Miranda

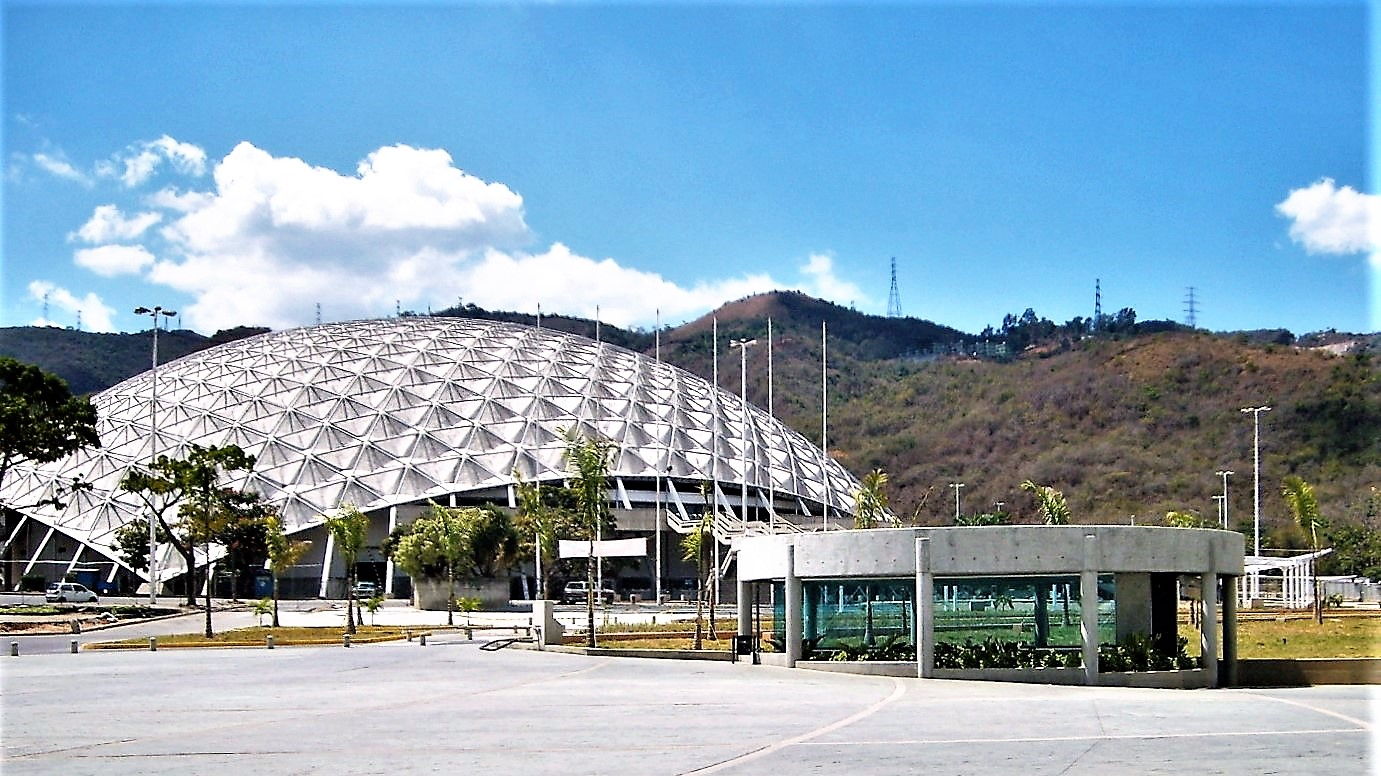
Front view of the Caracas Polyhedron

Miss Venezuela 1996 was the 43rd Miss Venezuela pageant, was held in Caracas, Venezuela, on September 6, 1996, after weeks of events. The winner of the pageant was Marena Bencomo, Miss Carabobo.

The pageant was broadcast live on Venevision from the Poliedro de Caracas in Caracas. At the conclusion of the final night of competition, outgoing titleholder Alicia Machado, Miss Venezuela 1995 and Miss Universe 1996, crowned Marena Bencomo of Carabobo as the new Miss Venezuela.

== Results ==
=== Placements ===
Placement	Contestant	International Placement
Miss Venezuela 1996	Carabobo — Marena Bencomo	1st Runner-Up — Miss Universe 1997
Miss Venezuela World 1996	Nueva Esparta — Ana Cepinska	Top 5 — Miss World 1996
Miss Venezuela International 1996	Miranda — Consuelo Adler	Winner — Miss International 1997
Nuestra Belleza Venezuela 1996	Lara – Adelaida Pifano	
1st Runner-Up	Zulia – Lorena Franceschi	
2nd Runner-Up	Táchira – Tatiana Irizar	
3rd Runner-Up	Barinas – Gabriela Vergara	
4th Runner-Up	Anzoátegui – Milena Romero	

=== Special awards ===
- Miss Photogenic (voted by press reporters) - Consuelo Adler (Miss Miranda)
- Miss Congeniality (voted by Miss Venezuela contestants) - Michelina Nuzzo (Miss Trujillo)
- Miss Elegance - Gabriela Vergara (Miss Barinas)
- Best Body - Milena Romero (Miss Anzoátegui)
- Most Beautiful Eyes - Rossi Conde (Miss Delta Amacuro)
- Best Hair - Tatiana Irizar (Miss Táchira)
- Best Skin - Consuelo Adler (Miss Miranda)

== Contestants ==
The Miss Venezuela 1996 delegates are:

- Miss Amazonas - Marina Lisabon Yolanda Taylhardat Ares
- Miss Anzoátegui - Milena del Carmen Romero Anduz
- Miss Apure - Malena Carolina Bello Bolívar
- Miss Aragua - Marjorie Correa Gallo
- Miss Barinas - Gabriela Vergara Aranguren
- Miss Bolívar - Samantha Verónica Blanco Csiszer
- Miss Carabobo - Marena Josefina Bencomo Giménez
- Miss Cojedes - Alexandra Karina Sánchez-Biezma Fernández
- Miss Costa Oriental - Karelys Margarita Ollarves Villarreal
- Miss Delta Amacuro - Rossi Aurelys Conde Rodríguez
- Miss Dependencias Federales - Carolina Elena Carvalho García
- Miss Distrito Federal - Lucila Margarita Weil Viso
- Miss Falcón - Nina Major's (Yazmin Madeleine Fuenmayor Bracho)
- Miss Guárico - Patricia Elena Ossorio Alvarez
- Miss Lara - Adelaida Pifano Freitez
- Miss Mérida - Hildegard Germaine Gehrenbeck Gabaldón
- Miss Miranda - Consuelo Adler Hernández
- Miss Monagas - Ana Karina Hoyos Mora
- Miss Municipio Libertador - Carol Grace Ginter Sagadín
- Miss Municipio Vargas - Yaridis Margarita Adrián Delgado
- Miss Nueva Esparta - Anna Cepinska Miszak
- Miss Península Goajira - Carola Thais Montiel Alvarez
- Miss Portuguesa - Gabriela Alejandra Guédez Contreras
- Miss Sucre - Cibel Trudy Marrero Díaz
- Miss Táchira - Tatiana Irizar Zabala
- Miss Trujillo - Michelina Nuzzo Franco
- Miss Yaracuy - Romina Natalia Meraviglia Kodelia
- Miss Zulia - Lorena Franceschi Valconi

Notes

- Marena Bencomo was named 1st runner-up in Miss Universe 1997 in Miami, Florida, United States. Prior to her participation in that event, she attended the Reinado Internacional del Café 1997 in Manizales, Colombia where she placed as Virreina.
- Anna Cepinska placed as 3rd runner-up in Miss World 1996 in Bangalore, India. Years later, she competed in a pageant called Miss Blonde and was 1st runner-up. She lives in Mexico since 2003.
- Consuelo Adler won the Miss International 1997 pageant in Kyoto, Japan.
- Adelaida Pifano placed as 2nd runner-up in Nuestra Belleza Internacional 1996, wearing a gown made of swarovski crystals with a total weight of 25 pounds.
- Gabriela Vergara was crowned Reina Sudamericana 1996 in Bolivia.
- Romina Meraviglia (Yaracuy) placed as 3rd runner-up in Miss Italy in the World 1997.
- Karelys Ollarves (Costa Oriental) was crowned Miss Caribbean World 1997 in Aruba.
- Tatiana Irizar became a famous TV presenter.
- Karelys Ollarves (Costa Oriental) and Hildegard Gehrenbeck (Mérida) competed in the Miss Republica Boliviariana de Venezuela 2000 contest.
- Carol Ginter (Municipio Libertador) is now a known fashion designer.
- Gabriela Guedez (Portuguesa) was host of a children's TV show.
