= Miss World 1997 =

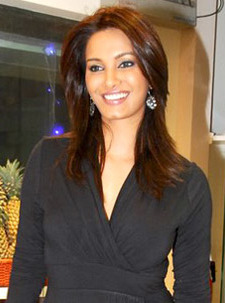
- Miss World 1997 Diana Hayden
- Date: 22 November 1997
- Presenters: Richard Steinmetz; Khanyi Dhlomo-Mkhize
- Venue: Plantation Club, Seychelles
- Broadcaster: Star World; E!; SBC
- Entrants: 86
- Placements: 10
- Debuts: Cape Verde; Nepal
- Withdrawals: Bangladesh; Bonaire; Curaçao; French Polynesia; Grenada; Guam; Kenya; Macedonia; Nigeria; Romania
- Returns: Bahamas; Cayman Islands; Egypt; Honduras; Malta; Namibia
- Winner: Diana Hayden; India
- Personality: Tanya Suesuntisook (Thailand)
- Best National Costume: Lauralee Martinovich (New Zealand)
- Photogenic: Diana Hayden (India)

Miss World 1997, the 47th edition of the Miss World pageant, was held on 22 November 1997 at the Plantation Club Seychelles in Baie Lazare, Seychelles. 86 delegates competed for the coveted crown.

At the end of the event, India's Diana Hayden came out victorious. Hayden went on to win the Miss World 1997 pageant at the age of 24 crowned by Miss World 1996, Irene Skliva of Greece. It was the first time the Miss World pageant was held in the Seychelles. She became the third Indian woman to win Miss World since Reita Faria in 1966 and Aishwarya Rai in 1994.

== Results ==
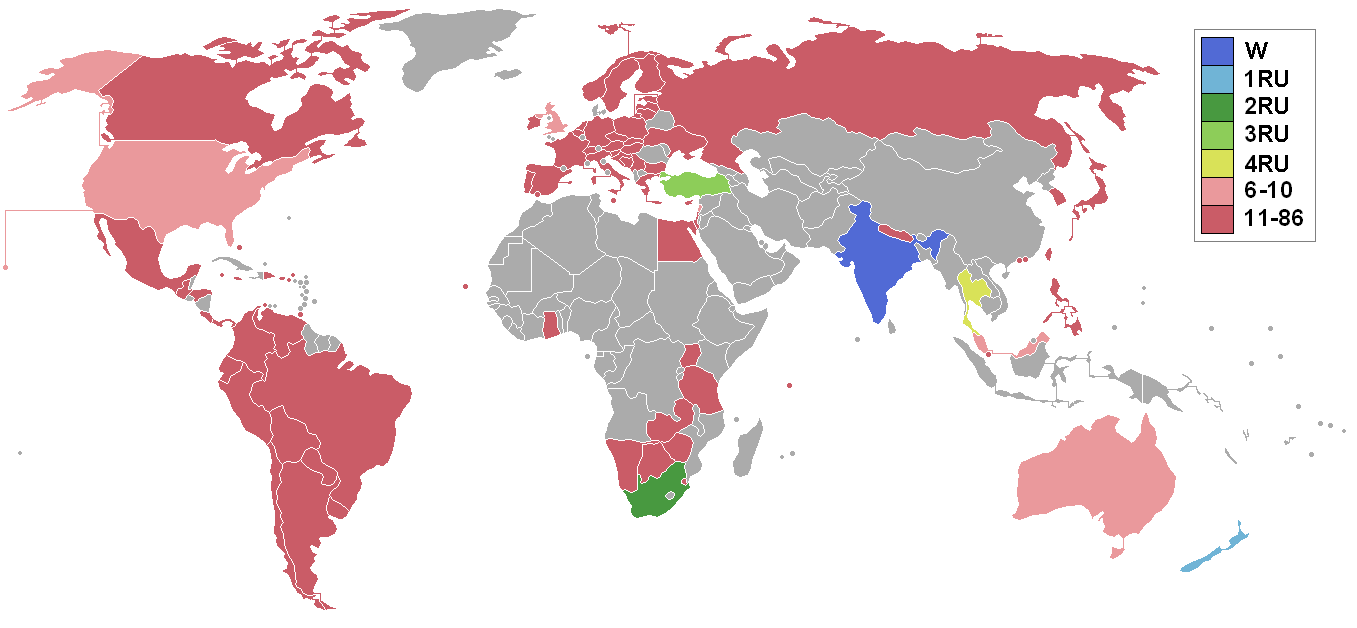
Countries and territories which sent delegates and results for Miss World 1997

=== Placements ===
Placement	Contestant
Miss World 1997	India – Diana Hayden
1st Runner-Up	New Zealand – Lauralee Martinovich
2nd Runner-Up	South Africa – Jessica Motaung
Top 5	Thailand – Tanya Suesuntisook; Turkey – Çağla Şıkel
Top 10	Australia – Laura Csortan; Lebanon – Joëlle Behlock; Malaysia – Arianna Teoh; United Kingdom – Vicki-Lee Walberg; United States – Sallie Toussaint

==== Continental Queens of Beauty ====
Continental Group	Contestant
Africa	South Africa – Jessica Motaung
Americas	United States – Sallie Toussaint
Asia & Oceania	India – Diana Hayden
Caribbean	Jamaica – Michell Moodie
Europe	Turkey – Çağla Şıkel

== Contestants ==
- Argentina – Natalia Pombo
- Aruba – Michella Laclé Croes
- Australia – Laura Csortan
- Austria – Susanne Nagele
- Bahamas – Alveta Adderley
- Belgium – Sandrine Corman
- Bolivia – Mitzy Suárez Saucedo
- Bosnia and Herzegovina – Elma Terzić
- Botswana – Mpule Kwelagobe
- Brazil – Fernanda Rambo Agnes
- British Virgin Islands – Zoe Jennifer Walcott
- Bulgaria – Simona Velitchkova
- Canada – Keri-Lynn Power
- Cape Verde – Carmelinda Gonçalves
- Cayman Islands – Cassandra Powell
- Chile – Paulina Mladinic
- Colombia – Gladys Buitrago Caicedo
- Costa Rica – Rebeca Escalante Trejas
- Croatia – Martina Novosel
- Cyprus – Galatia Charalambidou
- Czech Republic – Terezie Dobrovolná
- Dominican Republic – Carolina Estrella Peña
- Ecuador – Clío Olaya Frías
- Egypt – Amel Shawky Soliman
- Estonia – Mairit Roonsar
- Finland – Minna Lehtinen
- France – Laure Belleville
- Germany – Katja Glawe
- Ghana – Benita Sena Golomeke
- Gibraltar – Rosanna Ressa
- Greece – Eugenia Limantzaki
- Guatemala – Lourdes Mabel Valencia Bobadilla
- Holland – Sonja Aldina Silva
- Honduras – Hansel Cristina Cáceres Teruel
- Hong Kong – Vivian Lee Ming-Wai
- Hungary – Beata Petes
- India – Diana Hayden
- Ireland – Andrea Roche
- Israel – Mirit Greenberg
- Italy – Irene Lippi
- Jamaica – Michelle Moodie
- Japan – Shinobu Saraie
- Latvia – Līga Graudumniece
- Lebanon – Joëlle Behlock
- Lithuania – Asta Vyšniauskaitė
- Macau – Agnes Lo Vai Van
- Malaysia – Arianna Teoh
- Malta – Sarah Vella
- Mexico – Blanca Soto
- Namibia – Sheya Shipanga
- Nepal – Jharana Bajracharya
- New Zealand – Lauralee Martinovich
- Norway – Charlotte Høiåsen
- Panama – Patricia Aurora Bremner Hernández
- Paraguay – Mariela Quiñónez García
- Peru – Claudia María Luque Barrantas
- Philippines – Kristine Rachel Florendo
- Poland – Roksana Jonek
- Portugal – Icilia Silva Berenguel
- Puerto Rico – Aurea Isis Marrero Nieves
- Russia – Liudmila Popova
- Seychelles – Michelle Lane
- Singapore – Jasmine Wong
- Slovakia – Marietta Senčáková
- Slovenia – Maja Šimec
- South Africa – Jessica Motaung
- South Korea (Note: competed as Korea) – Kim Jin-ah
- Spain – Nuria Avellaneda Gallego
- Swaziland – Xoliswa Mkhonta
- Sweden – Sofia Joelsson
- Switzerland – Tanja Gutmann
- Taiwan (Note: Also known as the Republic of China) – Fang Su-Ling
- Tanzania – Saida Joy Kessys Sashays
- Thailand – Tanya Suesuntisook
- Trinidad and Tobago – Mandy Jagdeo
- Turkey – Çağla Şıkel
- Uganda – Lillian Acom
- Ukraine – Kseniya Kuz'menko
- United Kingdom – Vicki-Lee Walberg
- United States – Sallie Toussaint
- United States Virgin Islands (Note: competed as American Virgin Islands) – Taisha Regina Gomes
- Uruguay – Ana González Kwasny
- Venezuela – Christina Dieckmann Jiménez
- Yugoslavia – Tamara Šaponjić
- Zambia – Tukuza Tembo
- Zimbabwe – Una Patel

== Notes ==
=== Replacements ===
- South Africa - Kerishnie Naicker - Due personal problems. She went next year to Miss Universe 1998 and Miss World 1998 where become Top 5 and Queen of Africa.

=== Other Notes ===
- Australia – Laura Csortan also competed at Miss Universe in 1997, where she placed 13th to Brook Lee and it was held in Miami Beach, Florida.
- Botswana – Mpule Kwelagobe went on to compete in Miss Universe 1999 held in Chaguaramas, Trinidad and Tobago after two years and won the crown.
