= Diana Hayden =

Indian actress, winner of Miss World 1997

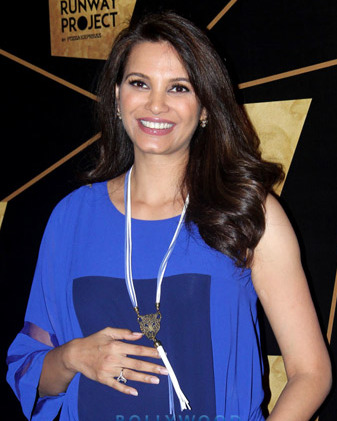
- Hayden in 2017
- Born: 1 May 1973 (age 53); Hyderabad, India
- Alma mater: Royal Academy of Dramatic Art; Drama Studio London
- Occupations: Actress; television host; model
- Height: 1.73 m (5 ft 8 in)
- Spouse: Collin Dick (m. 2013)
- Children: 3
- Beauty pageant titleholder
- Title: Femina Miss India World 1997; Miss World 1997
- Years active: 1997– 2012
- Major competitions: Femina Miss India 1997; (Winner - Miss India World); Miss World 1997; (Winner); (Miss World Asia & Oceania); (Miss Photogenic); (Spectacular Swimwear)

Diana Hayden (born 1 May 1973) is an Indian actress, tv host, model and the winner of Miss World 1997 pageant. She is the third Indian woman to win the title of Miss World. She also won three sub-titles during the pageant and is the only Miss World titleholder to do so. In 2008, she was a celebrity contestant in the reality show Bigg Boss.

== Early life ==
Hayden was born in Hyderabad, Telangana, India, in an Anglo-Indian Roman Catholic family. She attended St. Ann's High School in Secunderabad. Her parents separated when she was in school and she had to start working at the age of 13. She worked for an event management company called Encore, during when she began taking up modelling assignments. At the age of 21, she worked as a Public Relations Officer at BMG Crescendo, where she assisted in managing the careers of singers Anaida and Mehnaz Hoosein.

== Pageantry ==
Hayden's journey in pageantry began at the age of 23, when a friend recommended her to enter Femina Miss India. She was then shortlisted for the Femina Miss India 1997 contest. She finished second place and earned the title of Miss India World. She represented India at the 47th edition of the Miss World pageant held in Baie Lazare, Seychelles. A total of 86 delegates competed for the title and at the end of the event, Hayden was crowned as Miss World 1997.

During the question and answer segment of the competition, Hayden was asked "Why do you want to become Miss World?". She replied:

I draw inspiration from a famous writer and poet, William Butler Yeats, who once wrote - 'With Dreams Begin Responsibility.' Well for me, this title is that dream and the responsibility it brings, I cherish that in a small way I could make a difference and help the dreams of others. Thank you.

Hayden was also crowned as the "Miss World - Asia and Oceania" during the Miss World contest. In addition, she won the titles Miss Photogenic and Spectacular Swimwear. Hayden is the only Miss World titleholder to win three subtitles during the competition. She is the third Indian woman to win the Miss World pageant, after Reita Faria in 1966 and Aishwarya Rai Bachchan in 1994.

After her win at Miss World, she was signed up to endorse L'Oréal, Colgate and Chopard in India. She has been associated with various charities including Child Rights and You (CRY), Greenpeace, PETA and the Spastics Society of India. She has supported several causes to spread awareness about cancer and HIV/AIDS.

== Career ==
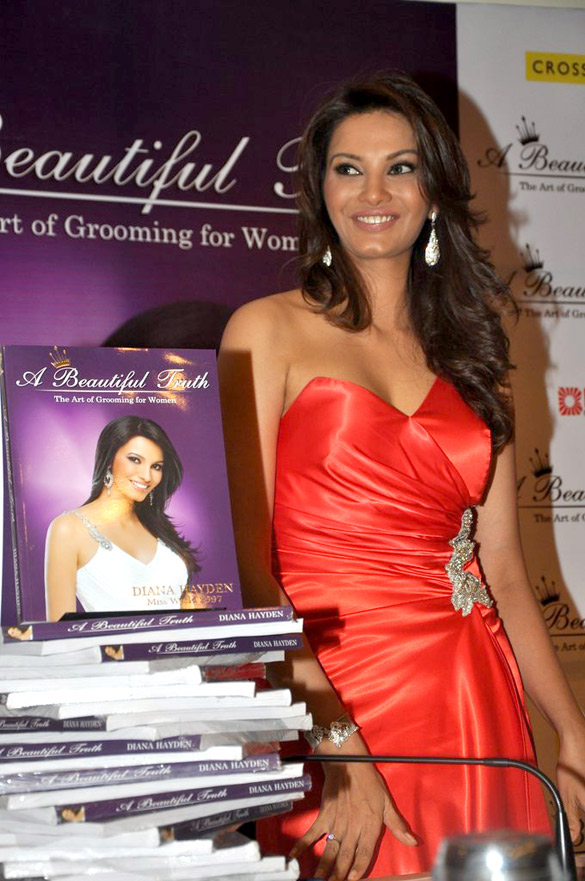
Hayden at her book launch in 2012

Following her year as Miss World, Hayden moved to London and studied acting at the Royal Academy of Dramatic Art. She also studied at the Drama Studio London, where she concentrated on the works of Shakespeare and earned a best actress nomination from the studio. In 2001, she made her screen debut in the film version of Shakespeare's Othello in South Africa.

She hosted Miss Europe in 2001 and 2002 in Lebanon, along with Miss Lebanon 1997 and Julien Lepers. In 2005 she hosted a Television series titled Biography with Diana Hayden on The History Channel, India. Diana was signed in 2006 as the face of the Avalon Academy and currently serves as a celebrity Guest Lecturer for airline personnel training programmes.

In 2008, Hayden was a wild card entry on the second season of the Indian TV show Bigg Boss, and was voted off in Week 13.

Hayden spent two years writing A Beautiful Truth, an "encyclopedia on grooming and also deals with personality development and confidence building". It was published on 6 August 2012.

== Personal life ==
Hayden is married to Collin Dick, an American businessman from Nevada. He had been working in Mumbai for an international NGO. In an interview, Hayden had stated that she met Dick when he came as a prospective tenant to rent her apartment. They got married in a private ceremony which was attended by their family and close friends, on 13 September 2013. The wedding took place in a country club in Las Vegas.

In 2016, she gave birth to a girl. The child was born from an egg that Hayden had frozen 8 years previously. In November 2017, Hayden confirmed that she was pregnant for the second time.

== Controversy ==
In 2018, Biplab Kumar Deb, the Chief Minister of Tripura commented on Hayden during a public speech. He questioned the rationale behind crowning Hayden as Miss World in 1997 and claimed that all international beauty pageants were a farce, since Hayden, who Deb found to be not beautiful, was crowned in 1997.

Deb said, "Tell me, did she [Diana] deserve it? I can understand Aishwarya Rai getting it, at least she has traits of an Indian beauty." He went on to add that "for Indians, Goddess Lakshmi and Saraswati exemplify beauty. I don't understand the beauty of Diana Hayden."

Deb's remarks prompted a backlash from netizens and social activists. Hayden responded with:

I am fighting this brown skin bias since my childhood, and I have succeeded. I am a proud brown-skinned Indian and I am hurt. I've had to fight the 'light skin is better' issue we have in India. I felt so strongly about it that I turned down a fairness cream ad because it went against my belief. The minister is in a prominent position and he should be careful about what he says.

Deb later expressed regret and apologised for his remarks on Hayden.

== Filmography ==
=== Films ===
Year	Title	Role	Notes	Ref.
2003	Tehzeeb	Sheena Roy		
2004	Ab... Bas!	Somiya Mathur		
2006	Othello: A South African Tale	Emilia		
2006	All Alone		Cameo	
2012	Lorie: The Loving Doll	Actress		

=== Television ===
Year	Title	Role	Notes	Ref.
1997	Femina Miss India 1997	Herself	National pageant	
1997	Miss World 1997	Herself	International pageant	
1998	Miss World 1998	Herself/Reigning Miss World	International pageant	
2000	Wisden Cricketers of the Century	Host		
2002	Miss Europe 2002	Host		
2003	Holby City	Nat Hussein	Cameo	
2005	Biography with Diana Hayden	Host	The History Channel	
2005	Miss World 2005	Judge	International pageant	
2008	Bigg Boss 2	Contestant	6th place	
2009	Femina Miss India 2009	Judge	National pageant	
2011	Ad Asia Awards	Host		
2012	Laureus World Sports Awards	Host		

Awards and achievements
Preceded by (Greece) Irene Skliva	Miss World; 1997	Succeeded by (Israel) Linor Abargil
Preceded by (India) Rani Jeyraj	Miss World Asia & Oceania; 1997	Succeeded by (Malaysia) Lina Teoh
Preceded by (Venezuela) Ana Cepinska	Miss World Photogenic; 1997	Succeeded by (Brazil) Adriana Reis
Preceded by Rani Jeyraj	Femina Miss India World; 1997	Succeeded by Annie Thomas
