= Veruska Ramírez =

Venezuelan beauty pageant titleholder

Veruzhka Ramírez
- Born: Veruzhka Tatiana Ramírez; Táriba, Táchira, Venezuela
- Height: 1.82 m (6 ft 0 in)
- Beauty pageant titleholder
- Title: Miss Táchira 1997 Miss Venezuela 1997
- Hair color: Light Brown
- Eye color: Green
- Major competitions: Miss Venezuela 1997 (winner); (Most Beautiful Eyes); Miss Universe 1998 (1st runner-Up); (Best in Swimsuit)

Veruzhka Tatiana Ramírez is a Venezuelan beauty pageant titleholder who won Miss Venezuela 1997, and was first runner-up at Miss Universe 1998.

== Miss Venezuela 1997 ==
Ramirez was abandoned as a child and grew up in relative poverty. In 1997, reigning Miss Venezuela Marena Bencomo visited Táchira, where Ramírez approached her for an autograph. Bencomo encouraged her to go to Caracas to compete for the Miss Venezuela 1997 title, where Osmel Sousa appointed her as Miss Táchira.

As the winner of Miss Venezuela 1997, she went on to represent her country at Miss Universe 1998.

== Miss Universe 1998 ==
Ramírez was the official representative of Venezuela to Miss Universe 1998, held in Honolulu, Hawaii. She placed first runner-up to Wendy Fitzwilliam of Trinidad and Tobago.

== Kidnapping ==
Ramírez was kidnapped for three hours in 2003.

== See also ==
- List of kidnappings
- List of solved missing person cases (2000s)

Awards and achievements
Preceded by (Venezuela) Marena Bencomo	Miss Universe 1st Runner-Up; 1998	Succeeded by (Philippines) Miriam Quiambao
Preceded by (Curaçao) Verna Vasquez	Miss Universe - Best in Swimsuit; 1998	Succeeded by (Spain) Diana Nogueira
Preceded by Marena Bencomo	Miss Venezuela; 1997	Succeeded by Carolina Indriago
Preceded by Tatiana Irizar Zabala	Miss Táchira; 1997	Succeeded by Johanna Grimaldo
