= Robert Kovač =

Croatian footballer (born 1974)

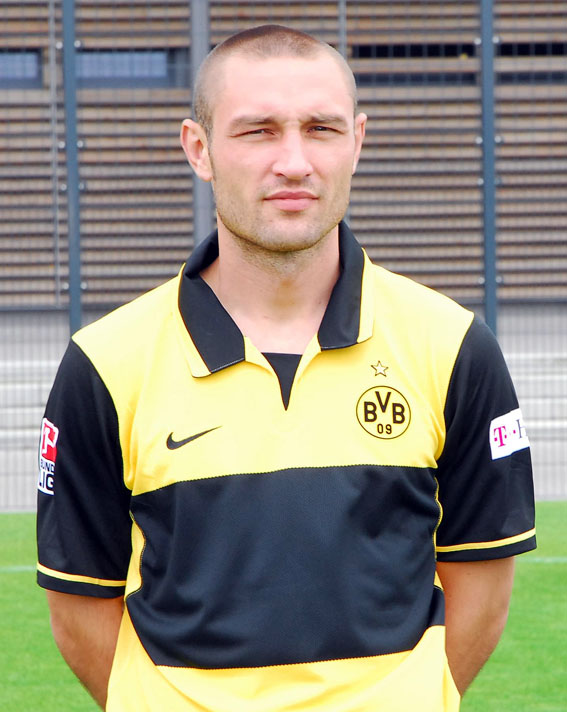
- Kovač with Borussia Dortmund in 2007

Personal information
- Full name: Robert Kovač
- Date of birth: 6 April 1974 (age 52)
- Place of birth: West Berlin, West Germany
- Height: 1.82 m (6 ft 0 in)
- Position: Centre-back

Team information
- Current team: Borussia Dortmund (assistant)

Youth career
- 1980–1986: Rapide Wedding
- 1986–1991: Hertha Zehlendorf

Senior career*
Years	Team	Apps	(Gls)
1991–1995	Hertha Zehlendorf	112	(12)
1995–1996	1. FC Nürnberg	33	(1)
1996–2001	Bayer Leverkusen	127	(1)
2001–2005	Bayern Munich	94	(1)
2005–2007	Juventus	35	(1)
2007–2008	Borussia Dortmund	26	(0)
2009–2010	Dinamo Zagreb	22	(0)
Total		449	(16)

International career
1999–2009	Croatia	84	(0)

Managerial career
- 2013–2015: Croatia (assistant)
- 2018–2019: Bayern Munich (assistant)
- 2020–2022: Monaco (assistant)
- 2022–2024: VfL Wolfsburg (assistant)
- 2025–: Borussia Dortmund (assistant)
- * Club domestic league appearances and goals

Robert Kovač (Croatian pronunciation: [rǒbert kǒʋaːtʃ, - kô-]; born 6 April 1974) is a professional football manager and former player who played as a centre-back. He is currently the assistant coach of Bundesliga club Borussia Dortmund. Born in Germany, he played for the Croatia national team, representing them at two FIFA World Cups and two UEFA European Championships. He was known for his ability with the ball and skill at dispossessing opponents. His older brother is football manager and former player Niko Kovač.

Kovač's career spanned 19 years across football clubs in Germany, Italy and Croatia.

== Club career ==
=== Early career ===
Kovač started his career in lower league clubs Rapide Wedding and Hertha Zehlendorf before making his Bundesliga debut with 1. FC Nürnberg in 1995. Regularly featuring in the first–eleven, Kovač attracted much attention to himself and was signed at the end of the season by Bayer Leverkusen.

=== Bayer Leverkusen ===
He spent the next five seasons in Leverkusen without any significant success, as the club did not win any trophy during that period, although they were three times Bundesliga runners–up.

=== Bayern Munich ===
After his contract expired, he went to join reigning champions of 2000–01 season and UEFA Champions League title holders, Bayern Munich. In four seasons with Bayern, he won two Bundesliga titles, two German Cup titles and the 2001 Intercontinental Cup.

=== Juventus ===
On 15 July 2005, he signed for Juventus. He was one of the few first–team players that decided to stay with Juve following their demotion to Serie B. He made a total of 35 appearances and scored one goal before he moved back to Germany, this time for Borussia Dortmund.

=== Borussia Dortmund ===
On 1 August 2007, he signed for Borussia Dortmund, alongside another Croatian national team star, Mladen Petrić, who signed for the club two months earlier. Kovač had an unsuccessful comeback to the Bundesliga and was sold to Dinamo Zagreb at the winter transfer window of 2008–09 season.

=== Dinamo Zagreb ===
On 29 January 2009, close to the January transfer window deadline, he signed a 1 1/2-year contract with Croatian champions Dinamo Zagreb. The club previously tried to sign him in the summer of 2007, but failed to meet his demands. Borussia Dortmund were compensated with €450,000. In his debut season Kovač made 12 appearances in the league and two more in Croatian Cup. He started the 2009–10 season with a foot injury and missed all of Dinamo's matches in July and August, but returned to action at the start of the September. Kovač finished the season with a total of 22 appearances for Dinamo in all competitions, before it was officially announced on 1 June 2010 that he retired from active football.

== International career ==
Kovač represented Croatia in two World Cups, 2002 and 2006, and has also participated at two European Championships, 2004 and 2008. At World Cup 2006 he played well in defence, however after picking up a second yellow against Japan he missed the final group match against Australia through suspension. Without Kovač, Croatia struggled in defence with his replacement Tomas committing handball for Australia's first goal via penalty kick. Croatia eventually drew 2–2 with Australia but were eliminated from the tournament. With Croatia, Leverkusen, and Bayern, Kovač was teammates with his older brother Niko Kovač. He retired from the national team in the fall of 2009, having captained the team after his brother's retirement in 2008. His final international was an October 2009 World Cup qualification match away against Kazakhstan.

== Coaching career ==
On 21 January 2013, Igor Štimac, the head coach of the Croatia national football team, announced that Kovač, alongside his older brother Niko, would take over as the Croatia national under-21 football team head coach. From October 2013 until September 2015, he was also an assistant manager to his brother, then the head coach of the Croatia senior team.

On 1 July 2018, he became the assistant manager of Bayern Munich. Robert's older brother, Niko, brought Robert with him to Bayern when he took over as the manager of the club. On 3 November 2019, he and his older brother parted ways with the club.

In July 2020, Kovač joined Monaco as assistant coach, with Niko serving as manager.

== Personal life ==
Kovač, along with his older brother Niko, was born in Berlin to a family of Bosnian Croat immigrants from Livno, Bosnia and Herzegovina. He is married to a former Croatian model and Miss World 1995 first runner-up, Anica Kovač.

== Career statistics ==
As of 13 September 2009

Club performance			League		Cup		League Cup		Continental		Total	
Season	Club	League	Apps	Goals	Apps	Goals	Apps	Goals	Apps	Goals	Apps	Goals
Germany			League		DFB-Pokal		Other		Europe		Total	
1991–92	Hertha Zehlendorf	NOFV-Oberliga Mitte	27	1							27	1
1992–93	Hertha Zehlendorf	NOFV-Oberliga Mitte	29	2							29	2
1993–94	Hertha Zehlendorf	NOFV-Oberliga Mitte	32	5							32	5
1994–95	Hertha Zehlendorf	Regionalliga North-east	24	4							24	4
1995–96	Nürnberg	2. Bundesliga	33	1	1	0					34	1
1996–97	Bayer Leverkusen	Bundesliga	13	0							13	0
1997–98	Bayer Leverkusen	Bundesliga	25	0							25	0
1998–99	Bayer Leverkusen	Bundesliga	31	0							31	0
1999–00	Bayer Leverkusen	Bundesliga	27	1			1	0	2	0	30	1
2000–01	Bayer Leverkusen	Bundesliga	31	0			1	0			32	0
2001–02	Bayern Munich	Bundesliga	29	0					8	0	31	0
2002–03	Bayern Munich	Bundesliga	24	0	1	0	1	0	5	0	31	0
2003–04	Bayern Munich	Bundesliga	19	0	1	0			7	0	27	0
2004–05	Bayern Munich	Bundesliga	22	0	3	0			8	0	33	0
Italy			League		Coppa Italia		League Cup		Europe		Total	
2005–06	Juventus	Serie A	18	1					4	0	22	1
2006–07	Juventus	Serie B	17	0					0	0	17	0
Germany			League		DFB-Pokal		Other		Europe		Total	
2007–08	Borussia Dortmund	Bundesliga	22	0	5	0			0	0	27	0
2008–09	Borussia Dortmund	Bundesliga	4	0	2	0			1	0	7	0
Croatia			League		Croatian Cup		League Cup		Europe		Total	
2008–09	Dinamo Zagreb	Prva HNL	12	0	2	0			0	0	14	0
2009–10	Dinamo Zagreb	Prva HNL	8	0	0	0			6	0	14	0
Total	Germany		392	14	13	0	3	0	31	0	439	14
Total	Italy		35	1					4	0	39	1
Total	Croatia		13	0	2	0			0	0	15	0
Career total			440	3	15	0	3	0	35	0	493	15

== Honours ==
Bayern Munich

- Bundesliga: 2002–03, 2004–05
- DFB-Pokal: 2002–03, 2004–05
- Intercontinental Cup: 2001

Juventus

- Serie B: 2006–07

Dinamo Zagreb

- Prva HNL: 2008–09
- Croatian Cup: 2008–09
