= Consuelo Adler =

Venezuelan model and beauty queen

- Born: Consuelo Adler Hernández; October 6, 1976 (age 50); Caracas, Venezuela
- Height: 1.80 m (5 ft 11 in)
- Beauty pageant titleholder
- Title: Miss Venezuela International 1996; Miss International 1997
- Hair color: Blonde
- Eye color: blue
- Major competitions: Miss Venezuela 1996 (Miss Venezuela International 1996) (Miss Photogenic) (Most Beautiful Skin); Miss International 1997 (Winner) (Miss Photogenic)

Consuelo Adler Hernández (born on October 6, 1976, in Caracas, Venezuela) is a Venezuelan model and beauty queen who became the second Miss International from her country in 1997.

== Miss Venezuela ==
A year prior to her win as Miss International, she competed as Miss Miranda in her country's national beauty pageant, Miss Venezuela, obtaining the title of Miss Venezuela International and the Most Beautiful Skin and Photogenic awards.

She crowned the new Miss Venezuela International at the 1997 Miss Venezuela pageant the day before she flew to Japan to participate in the pageant that she actually won.

== Miss International ==
The pageant was held in Kyoto Kaikan First Hall in Kyoto, Japan, where she was crowned Miss International 1997. Diya Abraham of India was first runner-up, and Marie Pauline Borg of France earned second runner-up. She also garnered the Miss Photogenic award.

== Career ==
After beginning her modeling career in Paris where she worked in high fashion and for major magazines. Currently as a model, her campaigns and TV commercials include: Sothys, Decleor, Cartier, Clairol, L'Oreal, Samuel Adam's, Johnson & Johnson, Wonderbra, Playtex, Nivea Ann Taylor, Vanity Fair and many others.

Awards and achievements
Preceded by (Portugal) Fernanda Alves	Miss International; 1997	Succeeded by (Panama) Lía Borrero
Preceded by (Zulia) Carla Steinkopf	Miss Venezuela International; 1996	Succeeded by (Aragua) Daniela Kosán
Preceded by Shakty Pinto	Miss Miranda; 1996	Succeeded by María Alejandra Márquez
