= Anica Kovač =

Croatian former model (born 1976)

- Born: Anica Martinović; 2 March 1976 (age 50); Duvno, FPR Yugoslavia
- Beauty pageant titleholder
- Title: Miss Croatia 1995
- Major competitions: Miss Croatia 1995 (Winner); Miss World 1995 (1st runner-up) (Miss World Europe) (Best National Costume)

Anica Kovač (Croatian pronunciation: [ânit͡sa kǒʋaːt͡ʃ]; née Martinović, pronounced [martǐːnoʋit͡ɕ]; born 3 March 1976) is a Croatian former model and beauty pageant titleholder. She was first runner-up in the Miss World 1995 competition and is married to the Croatian football player Robert Kovač.

== Biography ==
Kovač was born to Croatian gastarbeiter parents from the village Borčani in Duvno, Bosnia and Herzegovina on March 3 1976. Early in her life, her older brother and her lived with their grandparents as their parents moved to Germany looking for job opportunities. Eventually, her father founded a construction company, which allowed the family to reunite in Germany. She began modelling at an early age and became the winner of the national beauty contest Miss Croatia in 1995. At the 1995 Miss World competition, she finished as the First Runner-up to the eventual winner, Jacqueline Aguilera of Venezuela. She also won the Best National Costume award at the same event.

She has been married to Robert Kovač since 2001 and they have three children together.

Awards and achievements
Preceded by (Croatia) Branka Bebić	Miss World Europe; 1995	Succeeded by (Greece) Irene Skliva
Preceded by (Venezuela) Irene Ferreira	Miss World - Best National Costume; 1995	Succeeded by (Brazil) Anuska Prado
Preceded by (South Africa) Basetsana Makgalemele	Miss World (1st Runner-Up); 1995	Succeeded by (Colombia) Carolina Arango
