= Miss Venezuela 1997 =

44th edition of the Miss Venezuela competition

- Date: September 12, 1997
- Presenters: Napoleon Bravo; Maite Delgado; Alicia Machado; Sandro Finoglio
- Entertainment: Ilegales
- Venue: Poliedro de Caracas, Caracas, Venezuela
- Broadcaster: Venevision
- Entrants: 29
- Placements: 8
- Winner: Veruska Ramírez; Táchira
- Congeniality: Annarella Bono; Anzoátegui
- Photogenic: Christina Dieckmann; Nueva Esparta

Miss Venezuela 1997 was the 44th Miss Venezuela pageant, was held in Caracas, Venezuela on 12 September 1997. The pageant was won by Veruska Ramírez of Táchira, who was crowned by outgoing queen Marena Bencomo of Carabobo. 29 delegates competed for the crown.

== Results ==
=== Placements ===
Placement	Contestant
Miss Venezuela 1997	Táchira – Veruzhka Tatiana Ramírez
Miss Venezuela World 1997	Nueva Esparta – Christina Dieckmann
Miss Venezuela International 1997	Aragua – Daniela Kosán
Top 8	Cojedes – Maylen Noguera; Dependencias Federales – Catalina García; Distrito Federal – Jairam Navas; Vargas – Yosmely Soto; Zulia – Patricia Fuenmayor

=== Special awards ===
- Miss Photogenic (voted by press reporters) - Christina Dieckmann (Miss Nueva Esparta)
- Miss Internet (voted by www.missvenezuela.com viewers) - Christina Dieckmann (Miss Nueva Esparta)
- Miss Congeniality (voted by Miss Venezuela contestants) - Annarella Bono (Miss Anzoátegui)
- Miss Figure - Daniela Kosán (Miss Aragua)
- Best Hair - Annarella Bono (Miss Anzoátegui)
- Best Smile - Maylen Noguera (Miss Cojedes)
- Most beautiful Eyes - Veruska Ramírez (Miss Táchira)
- Miss Elegance - Heidi García (Miss Carabobo)
- Best Legs - Maria Alejandra Márquez (Miss Miranda)

== Contestants ==
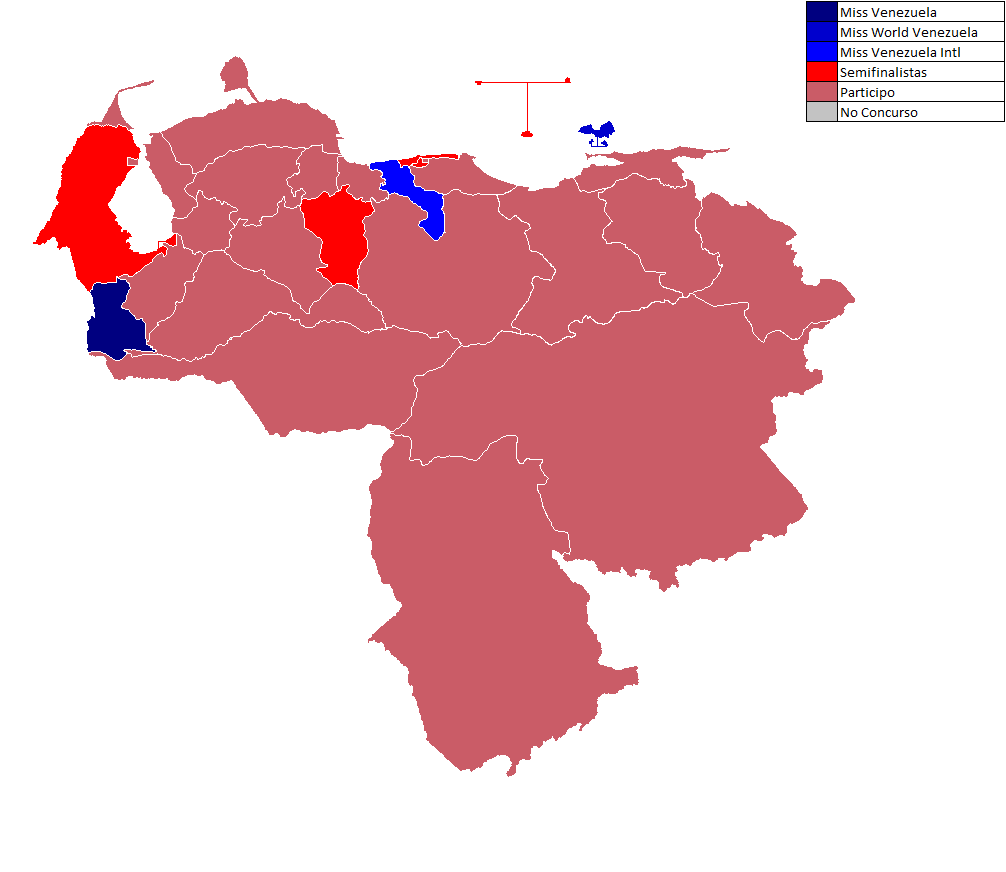
Map of results

The Miss Venezuela 1997 delegates are:

State	Contestant	Age	Height	Hometown
Amazonas	Ana Karina Casanova Santibañez	22	171 cm (5 ft 7 1/2 in)	Caracas
Anzoátegui	Annarella María Bono Morales	21	172 cm (5 ft 7 1/2 in)	Ciudad Guayana
Apure	Lucia Amalia Pérez Sosa	20	172 cm (5 ft 7 1/2 in)	Caracas
Aragua	Daniela Kosán Montcourt	23	178 cm (5 ft 10 in)	Maracay
Barinas	Claudia Virginia La Gatta Quintana	17	171 cm (5 ft 7 1/2 in)	Caracas
Bolívar	Linda Gabriela Avila Romero	18	171 cm (5 ft 7 1/2 in)	Los Teques
Carabobo	Heidi Angélica García Adragna	18	186 cm (6 ft 1 in)	Valencia
Cojedes	Maylen María Noguera	21	175 cm (5 ft 9 in)	Caracas
Costa Oriental	Peggy Andreína Valbuena Benítez	19	175 cm (5 ft 9 in)	Maracaibo
Delta Amacuro	Jeinar Moreno Ortega	21	173 cm (5 ft 8 in)	La Fría
Dependencias Federales	Catalina García Benito	21	171 cm (5 ft 7 1/2 in)	Caracas
Distrito Capital	Jairam Caric Navas Domínguez	18	170 cm (5 ft 7 in)	Caracas
Falcón	Ana Maria Tomicevic Dodig	17	176 cm (5 ft 9 1/2 in)	Caracas
Guárico	Denysse Carolina Carrillo Lozada	18	178 cm (5 ft 10 in)	Caracas
Lara	Adriana Elena Bustillos Fernández	21	171 cm (5 ft 7 1/2 in)	Caracas
Mérida	Jéssica Alejandra Madureri Perea	17	176 cm (5 ft 9 1/2 in)	Caracas
Miranda	Maria Alejandra Márquez Llorca	21	171 cm (5 ft 7 1/2 in)	Caracas
Monagas	Jennipher Sofia Rodríguez Chacín	19	178 cm (5 ft 10 in)	Caracas
Municipio Libertador	Graciela Zavatti Acuña	25	174 cm (5 ft 8 1/2 in)	Caracas
Municipio San Francisco	Andrea Gabriela Garay Carroz	17	176 cm (5 ft 9 1/2 in)	Maracaibo
Municipio Vargas	Yosmely Eglee Soto León	22	180 cm (5 ft 11 in)	Maiquetía
Nueva Esparta	Christina Dieckmann Jiménez	20	173 cm (5 ft 8 in)	Caracas
Península Goajira	Iohanna Beatriz Molero Urdaneta	23	175 cm (5 ft 9 in)	Maracaibo
Portuguesa	Zita Marlene de Andrade de Andrade	20	170 cm (5 ft 7 in)	Caracas
Sucre	Ysabel Margarita Sanabria Marcano	21	174 cm (5 ft 8 1/2 in)	Valencia
Táchira	Veruska Tatiana Ramírez	18	181 cm (5 ft 11 1/2 in)	Táriba
Trujillo	Helen Margaret Terán Henríquez	19	176 cm (5 ft 9 1/2 in)	Caracas
Yaracuy	Sandra Buseth Koplin	19	174 cm (5 ft 8 1/2 in)	Caracas
Zulia	Patricia Fuenmayor Hernández	19	177 cm (5 ft 9 1/2 in)	Maracaibo

Notes

- Veruska Ramírez placed as 1st runner-up in Miss Universe 1998 in Honolulu, Hawaii, United States.
- Christina Dieckmann was unplaced at Miss World 1997, failing to reach the semi-finals (top 10).
- Daniela Kosán won Nuestra Belleza Internacional 1997 in Miami, Florida, United States. She also placed as 1st runner up in Miss International 1998 in Tokyo, Japan.
- Patricia Fuenmayor won Reina Sudamericana 1997 in Santa Cruz, Bolivia.
- Jairam Navas won Reinado Internacional del Café 1998 in Manizales, Colombia.
- Maylen Noguera placed as semifinalist in Miss América Latina 1998 in Costa del Sol, El Salvador.
- Denisse Carrillo won Miss Blond International 1998 in Millstatt, Austria.
- Claudia La Gatta was placed as 4th runner up in Miss Italia Nel Mondo 1998 in Salsomaggiore, Italy.
- Andrea Garay was placed as semifinalist in Super Top Model of the World 1998 in Athens, Greece.
