= Yessica Salazar =

Mexican actress and model (born 1973)

- Born: Yessica Salazar González; December 28, 1973 (age 52); Guadalajara, Jalisco, Mexico
- Occupations: Actress; model
- Years active: 1996–present
- Title: Nuestra Belleza Mundo México 1996 (Winner) & Miss World 1996 (Top 10)

Yessica Salazar (born Yessica Salazar González on December 28, 1973 in Guadalajara, Jalisco, Mexico) is a Mexican actress, model and beauty pageant titleholder. who was crowned Nuestra Belleza Mundo México 1996 and represented her country at Miss World 1996.

She competed at Miss World 1996 placing among the semi-finalists in Bangalore, India on November 22, 1996. During the pageant, Yessica was also awarded the title of Miss Spectacular Beach Wear. She later began her career as an actress, making her debut in the Mexican telenovela La usurpadora.

== Filmography ==
Telenovelas, Series, Films
Year	Title	Role	Notes
1998	La usurpadora	Isabel Vidal	Special appearance
1999	Rosalinda	Pamela Iturbide	Special appearance
1999	Serafin	Marcela Fernandez	Supporting role
1999–00	Cuento de navidad		TV mini-series
1999–00	Tres mujeres	Esther	Supporting role
1999–00	DKDA: Sueños de juventud	Christi Borgoña	Supporting role
2000	Mi Destino Eres Tú	Lourdes "Lulú"	Supporting role
2001	Mujer bonita	Nelly	Supporting role
2001	La Intrusa	Tania Rivadeneyra	Supporting role
2001–02	El juego de la vida	Carola Lizardi	Supporting role
2002–03	Tu historia de amor	Sara	
2002–03	Clase 406	Brenda de San Pedro	Supporting role
2004–06	Rebelde	Valeria Olivier	Supporting role
2005	Como tú me has deseado		Film
2006	Heridas de amor	Marisol	Supporting role
2008	La rosa de Guadalupe	Teresa	TV series
2009–10	Verano de amor	Giovanna Reyes	Supporting role
2009–10	Camaleones	Catalina de Saavedra	Supporting role
2011	La Fuerza del Destino	Juliette Abascal de Rodríguez	Special appearance
2011–12	Esperanza del Corazón	Regina Ferreira	Supporting role
2013	La Tempestad	Dr. Antonieta Narvaèz	Supporting role
2013	Corazon Indomable	Delia	Supporting role
2013–14	Quiero Amarte	Carolina Rivera	Supporting role
2015	Como dice el dicho	Laura	Episode:"Un padre supone más..."

Awards and achievements
Preceded by Tania Prado Laursen	Nuestra Belleza Jalisco; 1996	Succeeded by Tatiana Della Rocca
Preceded by Alejandra Quintero	Nuestra Belleza Mundo México; 1996	Succeeded by Blanca Soto
