= Marena Bencomo =

Miss Venezuela 1996

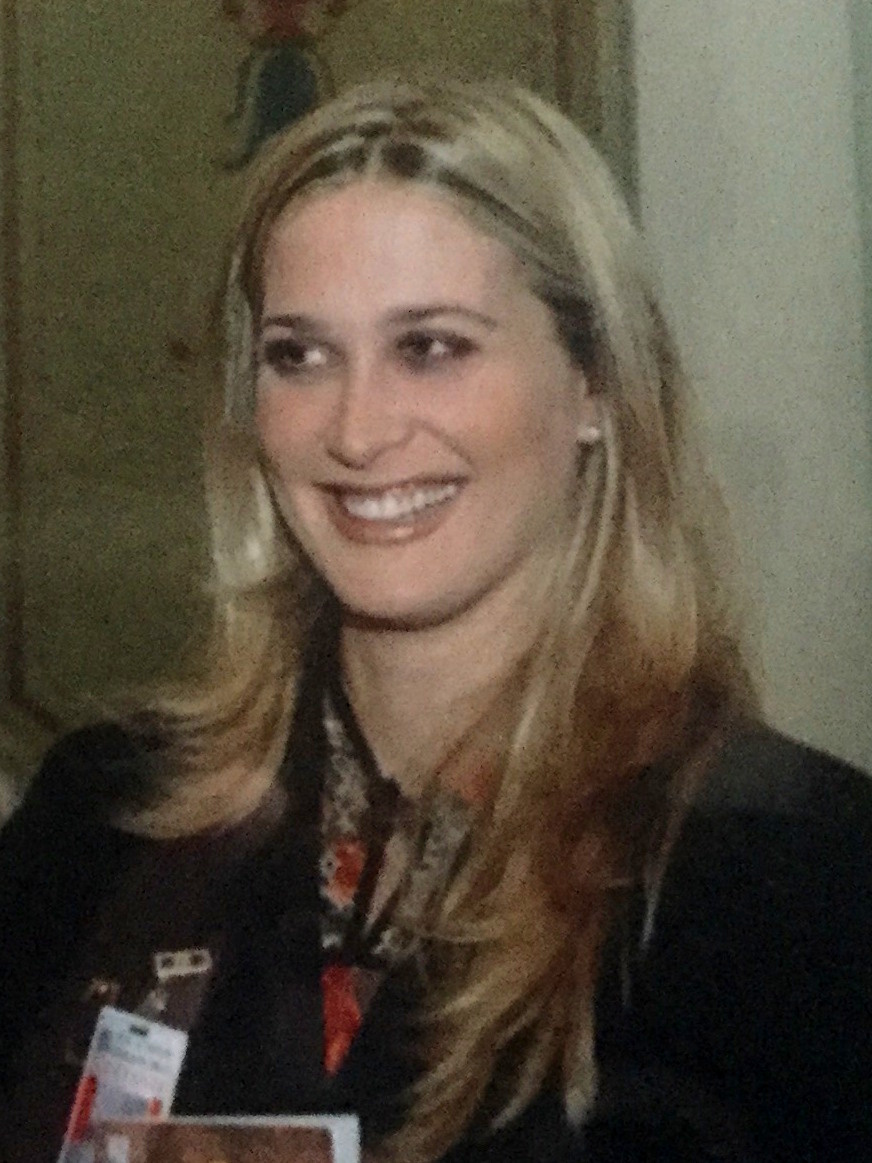
- Marena Bencomo in 2007
- Born: Marena Josefina Bencomo Giménez; April 15, 1974 (age 52); Valencia, Carabobo, Venezuela
- Height: 1.82 m (6 ft 0 in)
- Spouse: Richard Boulton (m. 1998; div. 2014)
- Children: 2
- Beauty pageant titleholder
- Title: Miss Venezuela 1996
- Hair color: Blonde
- Eye color: Hazel
- Major competitions: Miss Venezuela 1996; (Winner); Miss Universe 1997; (1st runner-up)

Marena Josefina Bencomo Giménez (born April 15, 1974 in Valencia, Carabobo) is a Venezuelan model and beauty pageant titleholder who was crowned Miss Venezuela 1996 and first runner-up to Miss Universe 1997.

== Pageantry ==
=== Miss Venezuela ===
Bencomo competed in 1996 as Miss Carabobo in her country's national beauty pageant, Miss Venezuela, capturing the crown and the right to represent her country in Miss Universe 1997.

=== Miss Universe ===
As the official representative of her country to the 1997 Miss Universe pageant held in Miami Beach, Florida on May 16, 1997, she placed first runner-up to eventual winner Brook Lee of the United States. At the time of participating in the contest, Bencomo studied Odontology in the University of Carabobo. After delivering the crown of Miss Venezuela, she briefly intervened as host of the program Tv Time to lead the Public Relations and Publicity of the defunct airline Avensa. There she met her husband, the CEO Richard Boulton, with whom she was married in December 1998. On July 15, 2000 Boulton was kidnapped by paramilitaries of the "United Self-Defense Forces of Colombia" while on his farm. After negotiations he was released in July 2002, in Villavicencio, Colombia. The couple have two sons.

On October 9, 2014, she was invited as a jury on the final night of Miss Venezuela 2014, held in Studio 1 of Venevisión.

Awards and achievements
Preceded by (Aruba) Taryn Mansell	Miss Universe 1st Runner-Up; 1997	Succeeded by (Venezuela) Veruska Ramírez
Preceded by Alicia Machado	Miss Venezuela; 1996	Succeeded by Veruska Ramírez
Preceded by Jackqueline del Valle	Miss Carabobo; 1996	Succeeded by Heidi García
