= Christina Dieckmann =

Venezuelan model and actress (born 1977)

- Born: Christina Dieckmann Jiménez; April 22, 1977 (age 49); Caracas, Venezuela
- Height: 1.72 m (5 ft 7 1/2 in)
- Beauty pageant titleholder
- Title: Miss Venezuela World 1997
- Hair color: Brown
- Eye color: Hazel
- Major competitions: Miss Venezuela 1997 (Miss Venezuela World 1997); (Miss Photogenic); (Miss Internet); Miss World 1997; (Unplaced)

Christina Dieckmann Jiménez (born April 22, 1977) is a Venezuelan actress, model and beauty pageant titleholder who participated in Miss Venezuela 1997 where she won a chance to go to Miss World. She then became a model and has worked for numerous advertising campaigns in Venezuela, United States and Brazil including Diet Pepsi. She has also appeared in a variety of soap operas including as Cibele in Seus Olhos in Brazil and Dama y Obrero (2013 telenovela) in United States and in many other soap operas.

== Filmography ==
- Amantes de Luna Llena (2000) as Bárbara Aristizábal
- Gata Salvaje (2002) as Estrella Marina Gutiérrez
- ¡Qué buena se puso Lola! (2004) as She Herself
- Seus Olhos (2004) as Cibele
- Se solicita príncipe azul (2005) as Victoria Landeta
- Y los declaro marido y mujer (2006) as Eloína Díaz
- Toda una dama (2007) as Valeria Aguirre
- Un esposo para Estela (2009) as Jennifer Noriega Roldán de Alberti
- Dama y obrero (American telenovela) (2013) as Karina Cuervo

Awards and achievements
Preceded by (Nueva Esparta) Ana Cepinska	Miss World Venezuela; 1997	Succeeded by (Monagas) Veronica Schneider
