= Miss Venezuela 1995 =

42nd edition of the Miss Venezuela competition

- Date: September 27, 1995
- Presenters: Gilberto Correa; Bárbara Palacios
- Entertainment: Carlos Baute, La India, Kiara, Guillermo Dávila, Guaco, Tambor Urbano
- Venue: Poliedro de Caracas, Caracas
- Broadcaster: Venevisión
- Entrants: 28
- Placements: 8
- Winner: Alicia Machado; Yaracuy
- Photogenic: Alicia Machado; Yaracuy

Miss Venezuela 1995 was the 42nd Miss Venezuela pageant, was held in Caracas, Venezuela on September 27, 1995, after weeks of events. The winner of the pageant was Alicia Machado, Miss Yaracuy.

The pageant was broadcast live on Venevisión from the Poliedro de Caracas in Caracas. At the conclusion of the final night of competition, outgoing titleholder Denyse Floreano, crowned Alicia Machado as the new Miss Venezuela.

== Results ==
=== Placements ===
Placement	Contestant	International Placement
Miss Venezuela 1995	Yaracuy — Alicia Machado	Winner – Miss Universe 1996
Miss Venezuela World 1995	Nueva Esparta — Jacqueline Aguilera	Winner – Miss World 1995
Miss Venezuela International 1995	Costa Oriental — Carla Steinkopf	Top 15 – Miss International 1996
1st Runner-Up	Vargas — Aurymir Vincent	
2nd Runner-Up	Lara — Zoraya Villareal	
3rd Runner-Up	Carabobo — Jacqueline Osorio	
4th Runner-Up	Trujillo — Mariana Cegarra	
5th Runner-Up	Barinas — Roselyn Silveira	

=== Special awards ===
Award	Contestant
Miss Photogenic	Yaracuy – Alicia Machado §
Miss Elegance	Trujillo – Mariana Cagerra
Best Body	Aragua – Penelope Sosa
Most Beautiful Eyes	Dependencias Federales – Angela Hernandez
Best Smile	Yaracuy – Alicia Machado

§ - Voted By The Press

== Contestants ==
The Miss Venezuela 1995 delegates are:

- Miss Amazonas - María Dolores (Lola) Pérez Fernández
- Miss Anzoátegui - Jenniffer Kristal Milano Hernández
- Miss Apure - Maria Luisa Domínguez Loureiro
- Miss Aragua - Penélope María Sosa Rivero
- Miss Barinas - Roselyn Silveira Mata
- Miss Bolívar - Irene Chuecos Marrero
- Miss Carabobo - Jackqueline del Valle Osorio Castro
- Miss Cojedes - Jacqueline Rivero Matheus
- Miss Costa Oriental - Carla Andreína Steinkopf Struve
- Miss Delta Amacuro - Nayber Torres Barrios
- Miss Dependencias Federales - Angela María Hernández Márquez
- Miss Distrito Federal - Bárbra Briggite Bennett Briceño
- Miss Falcón - Rosanna Teresa Bertoni Barrios
- Miss Guárico - Lorena Lisbeth Loreto Infante
- Miss Lara - Zoraya Paola Villareal Mendoza
- Miss Mérida - Albelena Sanabria Guerrero
- Miss Miranda - Shakty Pinto Hiller
- Miss Monagas - Daniella Margarita Matheu Briceño
- Miss Municipio Libertador - Melanie Beatriz Nazco Hernández
- Miss Municipio Vargas - Aurymir Coromoto Vincent Martínez
- Miss Nueva Esparta - Jacqueline María Aguilera Marcano
- Miss Península Goajira - Kisvel Gabriela Brito Velásquez
- Miss Portuguesa - Mariangela Garófalo Oliva
- Miss Sucre - Raiza Sulhey Sarmiento Vielma
- Miss Táchira - Marifel Gómez Villafañe
- Miss Trujillo - Mariana Cegarra Félice
- Miss Yaracuy - Joseph Alicia Machado Fajardo
- Miss Zulia - Anielska Montiel Reveról
