= Samantha (TV series) =

- Genre: Telenovela; Romance; Drama
- Created by: Vivel Nouel
- Written by: Vivel Nouel; Elizabeth Alezard; Johnny Gavlovski; Edgar Frias; Iris Dubs
- Directed by: Claudio Callao; Arquímedes Rivero
- Starring: Alicia Machado; Alejandro Martinez; Nohely Arteaga; Milena Santander
- Opening theme: Samantha by Alejandro Martinez
- Ending theme: Samantha by Alejandro Martinez
- Country of origin: Venezuela
- Original language: Spanish
- No. of episodes: 120

Production
- Executive producer: Arnaldo Limansky
- Producer: Consuelo Delgado
- Running time: 45 minutes
- Production company: Venevisión

Original release
- Network: Venevisión
- Release: March 10 – July 23, 1998

Related
- Destino de mujer; El país de las mujeres

Samantha is a Venezuelan telenovela written by Vivel Nouel and produced by Venevisión in 1998. This telenovela lasted 120 episodes and was distributed internationally by Venevisión International.

Alicia Machado and Alejandro Martinez starred as the main protagonists with Nohely Arteaga and Milena Santander as antagonists.

== Synopsis ==
Love literally falls from the sky for Samantha del Llano, a beautiful and free-spirited young peasant, who lives and works at landowner Valdemar Rincon's lavish hacienda. One day, while wandering around the far reaches of the ranch in search of her horse, Samantha sees a small private plane crash nearby, and she immediately runs to the scene of the accident. Inside the plane, she finds Luis Alberto Aranguren, badly hurt but semi-conscious. Although she does not realize it yet, this handsome millionaire from the city will be her one true love.

Because the impact from the crash has caused Luis Alberto to lose his memory, he is unable to tell Samantha and the Rincon family his real identity. They believe him to be merely the pilot, an employee of the powerful Aranguren Corporation instead of its owner. Samantha does not really care who he is - she is a sweet, unpretentious country girl with few ambitions - and her main concern is nursing this stranger back to health. During the following weeks, a magical romance develops between Samantha and Luis Alberto, two persons who know practically nothing about each other, but are simply following their hearts.

However, once Luis Alberto is taken back to the capital, he recovers his memory and unconsciously blacks out everything that happened after the accident, including the loving Samantha. He returns home to discover that his wife, gravely ill for five years, has died. Everyone thinks she succumbed to her illness, but in reality Betzaida, who is secretly in love with Luis Alberto and is now determined to conquer him, murdered her. Another woman will try to do the same: Raiza, Valdemar Rincon's daughter, a spoiled and selfish college student who set her sights on Luis Alberto after discovering his wealth and social position.

While on a date with Raiza, Luis Alberto remembers Samantha. He goes back to find her and they marry in a village ceremony. Upon their return to the city, Samantha must face three enemies: Betzaida, Raiza and Luis Alberto's teenage daughter, Anabela, who feels betrayed by her father's wedding, soon after her mother's death. These three women will succeed in tearing Samantha and Luis Alberto apart. They will have many hardships before they can be reunited.

== Cast ==
- Alicia Machado as Samantha del Llano
- Alejandro Martinez as Luis Alberto Aranguren Luján
- Nohely Arteaga as Raiza Rincón Luzardo
- Milena Santander as Betzaida Martínez
- Vicente Tepedino as Salvador Hidalgo
- Jonathan Montenegro as Alexander Hernández
- Daniel Alvarado as Arcadio 'el Maute' Guanipa
- Martin Lantigua as Lorenzo del Llano
- Gustavo Rodríguez as Don Valdemar Rincón
- Elizabeth Morales as Elena de Aranguren
- Eva Blanco as Alba Lujan de Aranguren
- Haydee Balza as Lavinia Luzardo de Rincón
- Daniela Bascopé as Anabela
- Jorge Aravena as Rodolfo Villalobos
- Carlos Arreaza as Samuel Casanova
- Janin Barboza as Cristina
- Vangie Labalan as Blanca
- Julio Capote as Rosendo
- Martha Carbillo as Alexandrina
- Katerine Castro as Rina
- Francisco Ferrari as Dr. Arturo Hidalgo
- Aitor Gaviria as Pascual Martínez
- Elaiza Gil as Chicharra
- Mauricio González as Padre Lino
- Carolina Groppuso as Yusmeri
- Olga Henriquez as Vestalia Luzardo
- Karl Hoffman as Ramón Demetrio Calzadilla
- Ana Martinez as Querubina
- Ana Massimo as Laura del Llano
- Jenny Noguera as Macarena
- Patricia Oliveros as Sarita
- Martha Olivo as Doña Teodora Torrealba
- Carlos Omaña as Pantoja
- Winda Pierralt as Joanna
- Mauricio Renteria as Tirzo Guevara
- Patricia Tóffoli as Damaris'
- Judith Vasquez as Gertrudis
- Sonia Villamizar as Deborah Marcano Rodriguez
- Jose Luis Zuleta as Jorge
