= Vicki-Lee Walberg =

Vicki-Lee Walberg (born 11 October 1975) is a British actress, model and beauty pageant titleholder who was crowned Miss United Kingdom 1997 and represented United Kingdom at Miss World 1997 where she placed Top 10. She was born on The Wirral near Liverpool, England. She was the last title holder to advance to the semifinal of the contest. Walberg later went on to work in television and was a 'Dolly Dealer' in Bruce Forsyth's Play Your Cards Right on ITV during its 2002 revival.

Preceded by Rachael Liza Warner	Miss United Kingdom; 1997	Succeeded by Emmalene McLoughlin
