= Laura Csortan =

Australian model and presenter

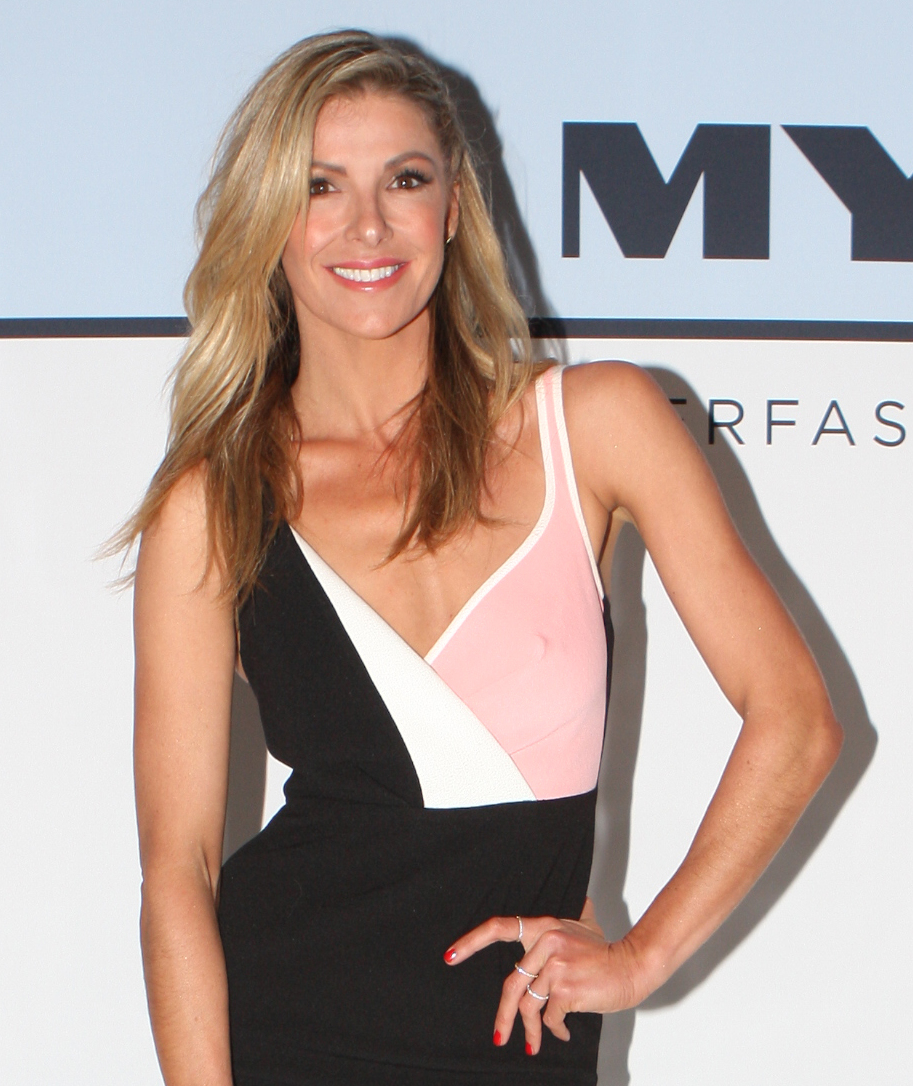
- Csortan in August 2015
- Born: 9 November 1976 (age 50); Brisbane, Queensland, Australia
- Occupations: Television presenter, model, MC
- Years active: 1996–present

Laura Csortan (born 9 November 1976) is an Australian model, television presenter and beauty pageant titleholder. She is known for winning the title of Miss Australia in the year 1997 and represented Australia at Miss Universe 1997 where she was unplaced and at Miss World 1997 pageant where she made it in top 10 semi finalists.

== Career ==
=== Modelling ===
Csortan was crowned Miss Australia 1997 and represented her country in Miss Universe 1997, where she won Miss Congeniality and finished in 13th place. Csortan competed in Miss World 1997, where she was a top 10 semi-finalist.

=== Television ===
From October 2000 until November 2008, she was a host of The Great Outdoors on the Seven Network. She formerly co-hosted the Australian version of Wheel of Fortune, with Larry Emdur.

She hosted Channel 7's broadcast of the BBC's Massive Nature, Racing Today, blooper show Good As Gold and was a panellist on Grand Prix TV. In 2009 Laura was a newsreader for Fox Sports News. Csortan hosted a behind the scenes show for Australia's Got Talent in 2012.

Since 2012, Csortan has been a regular on Channel 7's The Morning Show where she hosts travel segments. Csortan has regularly appeared on Sunrise as a panellist.

=== Other ===
Csortan has appeared in advertising for Qantas. She lent her support for Ralph Lauren's Pink Pony campaign, the RSPCA's Set a Sister Free campaign, SunSCHine (Sydney Children's Hospital) Variety Club, and the Pink Hope Bright Pink Lipstick Day charity campaigns.

Csortan has performed internationally as a master of ceremonies for a number of events including Gday USA for Qantas, Fashions on the Field events for Myer and Emirates, Schwarzkopf Face of the Year, and the Good Food Expo, as well as for brands such as Toyota, Subaru, Mercedes-Benz and Ducati.

== Personal life ==
Csortan grew up riding dirt bikes on her family's farm and has been described as a "petrolhead with a penchant for motorbikes".

Csortan gave birth to a daughter, Layla Rose, in 2016.

== Filmography ==
Television
Year	Title	Role	Notes
2000–2006	The Great Outdoors	Herself	Co-host
2005–2006	Wheel of Fortune	Herself	Hostess
2007	Good As Gold	Herself	Host
2009	Fox Sports News	Herself	
2010	20 to 1	Herself	Episode "Sporty, Rich & Sexy" (#9.4)
2012	Australia's Got Talent	Herself	Behind the scenes host
2013	Celebrity Splash	Herself	Contestant
2010–	Sunrise	Herself	Panellist
2012–	The Morning Show	Herself	
2016	Riding Morocco: Chasing the Dakar	Herself	Documentary
