= Ana Cepinska =

Venezuelan model

- Born: Anna Cepinska Miszczak; 11 April 1978 (age 48); Caracas, Venezuela
- Height: 1.78 m (5 ft 10 in)
- Beauty pageant titleholder
- Title: Miss Venezuela World 1996
- Hair color: Blonde
- Eye color: Green
- Major competitions: Miss Venezuela 1996 ( Winner — Miss Venezuela World 1996); Miss World 1996 (Top 5) (Miss Photogenic)

Ana Cepinska Miszczak (born 11 April 1978) is a Venezuelan model and beauty pageant titleholder who was crowned Miss World Venezuela 1996, won the Miss World Photogenic award, and placed fourth runner-up at Miss World 1996.

== Miss World Venezuela ==
Cepinska, who stands 1.78 m (5 ft 10 in) tall, competed in 1996 as Miss Nueva Esparta in her country's national beauty pageant, Miss Venezuela, obtaining the title of Miss World Venezuela. From there, she represented Venezueela at Miss World 1996.

== Life after Miss World ==
She has lived in Mexico since 2004 to work in television, and became the first full-nude model of Playboy Mexico in April 2007.

Awards and achievements
Preceded by (Venezuela) Jacqueline Aguilera	Miss World Photogenic; 1996	Succeeded by (India) Diana Hayden
Preceded by Jacqueline Aguilera	Miss World Venezuela; 1996	Succeeded by Christina Dieckmann
