= Ab...Bas! =

Indian romantic thriller film

- Directed by: Rajesh Singh
- Written by: Atul Sharma (dialogue)
- Screenplay by: Kamal Pandey
- Story by: Atul Sharma
- Produced by: Raju Mavani
- Starring: Diana Hayden; Shawar Ali
- Cinematography: Ajay Pandey
- Edited by: K. Ravi Kumar
- Music by: Daboo Malik
- Production company: Jayraj Productions
- Release date: 26 November 2004
- Country: India
- Language: Hindi

Ab...Bas! (transl. Now...enough!) is a 2004 Indian Hindi-language romantic thriller film directed by Rajesh Singh and starring Diana Hayden and Shawar Ali. The film was inspired by the 2002 Hollywood film Enough (2002).

== Plot ==
Soumya, an Indian model, falls for Karan and leaves her job for him. Later, she finds out that he is a cheater and escapes. What happens next forms the rest of the story.

== Cast ==
- Diana Hayden as Soumya
- Shawar Ali as Karan
- Arun Bakshi as Soumya's foster father
- Neena Kulkarni as Soumya's foster mother
- Raju Kher as Soumya's father
- Praveen Sirohi as Soumya's friend
- Negar Khan (item number in "Kehta Hai Mera Dil")

== Production ==
The song "Tu Ishq Mera Hai" was shot at a floating market in Bangkok.

== Reception ==
A critic from Rediff.com wrote that "A single viewing is sure to give you a splitting headache". Taran Adarsh of Bollywood Hungama wrote that "On the whole, the target audience for AB? BAS! are the masses and it should keep them content". Subhash K. Jha of IANS wrote that "Ab...Bas! is the kind of phoney film about a social conscience that pricks the bubble of its whitewashed intentions".
