= La Madame =

- Created by: Nubia Barreto; Andrés Burgos; Claudia Rojas; Carolina Díaz
- Developed by: RTI Producciones; Sierralta Entertainment Group; Televisa; Univision Communications
- Directed by: Alejandro Bazzano; Felipe Niño
- Starring: Alicia Machado; Roberto Mateos
- Opening theme: "Madame" - Mariatta and Carlos Aguera
- Countries of origin: Colombia; United States
- Original language: Spanish
- No. of episodes: 37

Production
- Executive producers: Hugo León Ferrer; Alejandro García Bruno James
- Producers: Madeleine Contreras; Jorge Sastoque Roa
- Production locations: Bogotá, Colombia
- Camera setup: Multi-camera
- Running time: 45-46 minutes

Original release
- Network: UniMás
- Release: August 26 – October 31, 2013

La Madame is a 2013 Spanish-language series produced by RTI Producciones with collaboration from Sierralta Entertainment Group for the Mexican television network Canal de las Estrellas and the United States television network UniMás. Alicia Machado stars as the protagonist.

From August 26 to October 9, 2013, UniMás broadcast La Madame on weeknights at 10pm/9c, replacing Clorofomo, and from October 14, 2013, on weeknights at 7pm/6c. The last episode was broadcast on October 31, 2013.

== Cast ==
=== Main cast ===
Actor	Character
Alicia Machado	Madame Rochy "La Madame"
Roberto Mateos	Alejandro Puerta
Julio Sánchez Cóccaro	Pacho
Jessica Sanjuan	Tatiana / Gina
Norma Nivia	Luly de Puerta
Margarita Reyes	Edith
Pedro Rendón	Sergio Puerta
Luis Fernando Salas	Raúl Tuirán

== United States broadcast ==
- Release dates, episode name and length, and ratings based on UniMás' broadcast.

Air date	N^{o}	Episode title	Duration
August 26, 2013	1	"La Madame Capítulo 1"	45 minutes
August 27, 2013	2	"Quedará en evidencia su verdadera identidad"	46 minutes
August 28, 2013	3	"Quién es esta chica ruda y complaciente"	46 minutes
August 29, 2013	4	"Un amor inesperado nace en la cárcel"	47 minutes
September 3, 2013	5	"La Madame Capítulo 5"	46 minutes
September 4, 2013	6	"La Madame Capítulo 6"	46 minutes
September 5, 2013	7	"La Madame Capítulo 7"	46 minutes
September 9, 2013	8	"La Madame Capítulo 8"	45 minutes
September 10, 2013	9	"La Madame Capítulo 9"	46 minutes
September 11, 2013	10	"La Madame Capítulo 10"	45 minutes
September 12, 2013	11	"La Madame Capítulo 11"	45 minutes
September 16, 2013	12	"La Madame Capítulo 12"	46 minutes
September 17, 2013	13	"La Madame Capítulo 13"	45 minutes
September 18, 2013	14	"La Madame Capítulo 14"	46 minutes
September 19, 2013	15	"La Madame Capítulo 15"	45 minutes
September 23, 2013	16	"La Madame Capítulo 16"	46 minutes
September 24, 2013	17	"La Madame Capítulo 17"	46 minutes
September 25, 2013	18	"La Madame Capítulo 18"	46 minutes
September 26, 2013	19	"La Madame Capítulo 19"	46 minutes
September 30, 2013	20	"La Madame Capítulo 20"	46 minutes
October 2, 2013	21	"La Madame Capítulo 21"	46 minutes
October 3, 2013	22	"La Madame Capítulo 22"	45 minutes
October 7, 2013	23	"La Madame Capítulo 23"	46 minutes
October 8, 2013	24	"La Madame Capítulo 24"	46 minutes
October 9, 2013	25	"La Madame Capítulo 25"	45 minutes
October 10, 2013	26	"La Madame Capítulo 26"	46 minutes
October 14, 2013	27	"La Madame Capítulo 27"	46 minutes
October 15, 2013	28	"La Madame Capítulo 28"	46 minutes
October 16, 2013	29	"La Madame Capítulo 29"	46 minutes
October 17, 2013	30	"La Madame Capítulo 30"	46 minutes
October 21, 2013	31	"La Madame Capítulo 31"	46 minutes
October 22, 2013	32	"La Madame Capítulo 32"	46 minutes
October 23, 2013	33	"La Madame Capítulo 33"	46 minutes
October 24, 2013	34	"La Madame Capítulo 34"	46 minutes
October 28, 2013	35	"La Madame Capítulo 35"	46 minutes
October 29, 2013	36	"La Madame Capítulo 36"	46 minutes
October 31, 2013	37	"La Madame Capítulo 37"	46 minutes

== Broadcasters ==
Country	Alternative title/translation	TV network(s)	Series premiere	Series finale	Weekly schedule	Time slot
United States	La Madame	UniMás	August 26, 2013	October 31, 2013	Monday to Thursday	10pm/9c(22:00); 7pm/6c(19:00)
Dominican Republic	La Madame	Telemicro	November 4, 2013	January 16, 2014	Monday to Friday	21:00
Ecuador	La Madame	Gama TV	November 12, 2013	January 24, 2014	Monday to Friday	22:00
Panama	La Madame	Telemetro	March 26, 2014	June 9, 2014	Monday to Friday	22:00
Costa Rica	La Madame	Repretel	May 6, 2014	July 15, 2014	Monday to Friday	22:00
Colombia	Historias de una Madame	Caracol Television	March 29, 2016	August 12, 2016	Monday to Friday	23:00
