= Play Your Cards Right =

British game show

- Also known as: Bruce Forsyth's Play Your Cards Right
- Genre: Game show
- Based on: Card Sharks by Chester Feldman
- Presented by: Bruce Forsyth
- Country of origin: United Kingdom
- Original language: English
- No. of series: 16
- No. of episodes: 248 (inc. 6 specials & 4 unaired)

Production
- Running time: 30 minutes (inc. adverts)
- Production companies: LWT in association with Talbot Television and Goodson-Todman Productions (1980–87); LWT and Talbot Television (1994–95); LWT and Fremantle (UK) Productions (Grundy) (1996–99); Thames (2002–03)

Original release
- Network: ITV
- Release: 1 February 1980 – 22 November 1987
- Release: 18 March 1994 – 4 June 1999
- Release: 7 September 2002 – 20 June 2003

Related
- Card Sharks

Play Your Cards Right (or Bruce Forsyth's Play Your Cards Right) is a British television game show based on, and played similarly to, the American show Card Sharks.

== History ==
Produced by LWT for ITV and hosted by Bruce Forsyth, Play Your Cards Right was broadcast from 1 February 1980 to 22 November 1987. LWT produced a more modern version from 18 March 1994 to 4 June 1999, initially expected to be presented by Brian Conley, who recorded a pilot show before Forsyth was lured back after he unexpectedly quit The Generation Game. In 2002, Forsyth hosted another revival, with slightly modified rules. This version was produced by Thames Television and ended on 20 June 2003.

When Forsyth was guest host on the satirical BBC TV series Have I Got News for You in June 2003, it included a parody based on the most-wanted Iraqi playing cards called Play Your Iraqi Cards Right (working title: Play Your Kurds Right).

On 15 October 2005, Play Your Cards Right made a one-off return as part of Ant & Dec's Gameshow Marathon, celebrating 50 years of ITV. It made another one-off return in 2007 again part of Gameshow Marathon.

An interactive DVD game of Play Your Cards Right was released in 2007, with an updated sequel released in 2008, both produced by DVDPro.

== Format ==
=== Main game ===
Two couples (two single players during the first series) alternated who went first on each question. The questions were based on surveys of 100 people. The first couple would guess how many of the 100 gave a certain answer to the question, and the second would guess whether the actual number was higher or lower than the other couple's guess. (If the first couple guessed exactly the number of people, they would win a case of champagne, as opposed to a cash bonus depending on type of question on the US versions ($100 for 10-person surveys with another $100 split among the panel, $500 for 100-person surveys or general knowledge questions.) Whoever was correct gained control of the cards.

Unlike the US version, the questions usually had some comedic value (for example: The question would be, "We asked 100 tattoo-artists – if somebody came in asking for a tattoo of Bruce Forsyth, would you try to talk them out of it?, how many tattoo-artists said yes, if somebody came in asking for a tattoo of Bruce Forsyth, they would try to talk them out of it?". The first couple would joke around with Bruce, and then decide on a sum of, say, 64. The second couple would say "higher" (and Bruce would pretend to be offended). If the answer was, say, 26, the second couple were wrong in guessing "higher", so the first couple started with the cards.

There were five cards for each team laid out, and they had to guess if the next card was higher or lower — ace being the highest card, and two being lowest. The first card could be changed if the couple wished. If the guess was correct, the couple would continue with the next card, and so on. Correctly guessing all cards to the end won the game, but if the couple guessed wrong at any time or if they got a pair of cards, they would retreat back to the card where they started and the other team would have a free attempt at their own cards. (In this case, the couple could not change their first card.)

After any correct guess, a couple could "freeze", which would protect their cards. A marker would be placed by a dealer beside the frozen card, which meant that on the next question, a wrong guess on their cards would put them back no further than where they froze. This was usually done when the card shown was of a middle rank, such as a seven, eight or nine. After a couple froze their cards, play would continue to the next question. Should the couple regain control of the board on a correct question, they will be allowed to change the frozen card (due to it now being the card the couple would start on.).

If the next card was the same rank as the card showing, it counted as a wrong guess; indeed, this is the only way to be wrong when an ace or deuce appeared. "You don't get anything for a pair, not in this game" was Forsyth's catch phrase on such occasions.

If no team had managed to predict the last card correctly within the first three questions sudden death was played. The couple who gained control of the cards (either through their own correct prediction or the other couple's incorrect prediction) had to make a decision, either to "Play" and correctly predict the remainder of their cards to win, or "Pass" and force their opponents to achieve the feat. An incorrect prediction now caused their opposition to win the round.

In series 1, each game awarded £50 to the winner. By 1985, the winner of each of the two games in the first half would get a prize known as a "Brucie Bonus". The overall winner was the first couple to win two games. If a third game was required, three cards were played by each couple instead of five, with sudden death occurring on the third question instead of fourth. Also around the time a gift of a bottle of champagne was given to a couple in the rare instances where they correctly guessed the exact answer of a question. In the 1990s version, the losing couple were sent away with a luxury hamper in the first series, and from the second series onwards, it became a bouquet of flowers along with a decanter and glass set.

Prize cards

The winning couple got 200 points to begin with. Bruce would then ask a question, if they got it right, they'd win an extra 50 points, if they got it wrong, they lost 50 points. There were two rows of three cards dealt out (going from left to right, and upward), and one final card at the top. At the start of the bottom row, they had the chance to change their base card. At the start of the second row, they got an extra 200 points, and they had the chance to change the card. The rules are the same as in the previous game, but they had to bet on each turn of the card with a minimum bet of 50 points, or up to the number of points they have at that time. When they got to the final card, the couple's score determined the prize they played for. If they had 4,000 or more, they could play for the car (which was a separate game on the US version). They were asked a simple question (usually to name 5 of something – no-one ever got this wrong), and then predicted higher or lower for the final card, after given the chance to change the card. If they were right, they would win the car. If not, they won a prize based on their score. A score of less than 4,000 points after finishing the second row required a bet of at least half of the points.

In the 1990s version, points became pounds, but the rules remained the same. Also, on the final card, if they had £4,000 or more, and they were wrong, they would just have the money. What was emphasized was that their money was safe.

If the couple got to the final card with under £4,000, they could choose to take the money, or gamble all of it on the last card, known as 'Double or Bust' – with Bruce emphasising thus: "The rules are strict here – it is all or nothing" (unlike all US versions which required players to bet one-half or more of their winnings on the final card, allowing players to bet the minimum one-half if they were not confident because of a middle card; the 2019 US version added the option of taking the money before the final card from this version, regardless of the amount won, with the one-half minimum bet still in effect if they went on). The couple were still given the chance to change the card if they gambled however.

The maximum amount of money that could be won was £17,600, which was never achieved. (The highest win was £9,500)

=== 2002 version ===
The rules of the 2002 revival were partly based on the changes made in the 2001 revival of Card Sharks in the United States. All 13 cards from the suit of hearts from the 'Two' to the 'Ace' were put out face down. Four couples would then come on, and the two couples with the two highest cards would go through to the main game (the couple who picked the highest card was red team.). This was just an opening game. After this, Bruce's gag was to say "Well done you winners, and so sorry losers, we really are sorry to lose you so early in the show...tough." – followed by audience laughter. The rules of the main game were exactly the same as in the original version, except the "Brucie Bonus" was £1,000. If one couple won both the games, the losing couple would be sent home with a case of champagne before the break, otherwise, the losing couple would get to keep the £1,000 for winning their one-game (there was no money awarded for the tie-breaker).

In the Cash Cards, Bruce would first ask the winning couple a ridiculously hard, trivial or stupid question. They often pondered for a few seconds over this, then Bruce said "Aren't you glad you don't have to answer a question like that?", to which the audience would laugh – except that on at least two occasions, the contestants correctly answered the question, shocking Bruce, who accused the contestants – though in a humorous manner – of "ruining the show", prompting much more laughter from the audience.

The Cash Cards game was played similar to the United States versions from 1980-81 season and also the entire 1986-89 version's run. The couple was given £1,000 to start with and their minimum bet had to be £100, but they could bet the whole lot if they wanted to. If the couple survived the first three cards, another £500 would be added to the total on the fourth card. On the final card, the couple had to bet at least half the amount they had at that point. If a couple bet on the whole lot the wrong way during the first three cards, that card would be put on the row above and the additional £500 would be added on. If there was a pair revealed in the Cash Cards, "push" rule that had been implemented in the aforementioned US versions was in play, as they moved on to the next card without losing any money. If the last two cards on a row were a pair, the second card would be used as the base card for the row above.

The theoretical maximum in the Cash Cards is £136,000.

=== Personnel ===
Among Forsyth's other quips, he would, at the beginning of some shows, say, "What a lovely audience! You're so much better than last week." The joke was that the same audience was used for more than one show, therefore it was the same one. On other shows, he would begin by saying "You have cheered me up", before telling a humorous anecdote of something unfortunate that happened to him backstage. Bruce started each show with his trademark "It's nice to see you, to see you nice" (whereby the audience join in on the last "nice".). When a pair was revealed, he'd say "You don't get anything for a pair, not in this game.", and the audience would join in with the "not in this game" part. On the 2002 series in particular, he would often start the show with a made-up quote.

When Card Sharks was slated for a revival in 1986, Forsyth himself was considered as possible host by creator/producer Mark Goodson (Forsyth, at the time, was in the United States filming the short-lived Bruce Forsyth's Hot Streak). The job ultimately went to Bob Eubanks and Bill Rafferty.

Card dealers include Jo Thomas, Yvonne Younger, Zena Clifton, Natalie Shaw, Denise "Denni" Kemp, Lesley Anderson, Gillian Elvins, John Melainey, Camilla Blair, Gillian Duxbury, Alison Bell, Carol Dean, Brenda Haldane, Wendy Marler, Robin Martyne, Denni Kemp, Natalie van de Braam, Alison Bell, Carol Dean, Vicki Brattle, Sophie Allisstone, Carly Carter, Debbie Flett, Sharon Amos, Sheryl Deane, Charlie Maloney, Maxine Restall, Annalise Braakensiek and Vicki-Lee Walberg.

== Gameshow Marathon ==
Play Your Cards Right was one of the games on the series Gameshow Marathon in 2005 and 2007.

== Potential revivals ==
In 2011, a new pilot was made for a planned reboot of Play Your Cards Right on ITV with Vernon Kay as the new host. However, in November 2013, it was later scrapped because it "didn't involve enough skill". In June 2019 it was announced that, as one of the country's five all-time favourite game shows, it would be "supersized and rebooted" in a new series Alan Carr's Epic Gameshow filmed at dock10 studios for broadcast on ITV. Hosted by Alan Carr, the new episode was a celebrity special and was broadcast on 30 May 2020 as the first episode in the series. Carr had been linked to a possible revival of the show in August 2018. In 2020 presenter Ryan Swain revived the gameshow digitally via his Instagram attracting celebrity guests daily; it was to set up to entertain the NHS staff, carers and key workers during the COVID-19 pandemic.

== Transmissions ==
=== Series ===
Series	Start date	End date	Episodes	Presenter
1	1 February 1980	9 May 1980	14	Bruce Forsyth
2	5 September 1980	19 December 1980	16	Bruce Forsyth
3	16 October 1981	22 January 1982	13	Bruce Forsyth
4	17 September 1982	3 April 1983	16	Bruce Forsyth
5	11 September 1983	1 January 1984	15	Bruce Forsyth
6	31 August 1984	14 December 1984	15	Bruce Forsyth
7	30 August 1985	15 December 1985	16	Bruce Forsyth
8	29 August 1986	12 December 1986	16	Bruce Forsyth
9	4 September 1987	22 November 1987	12	Bruce Forsyth
10	18 March 1994	8 July 1994	16	Bruce Forsyth
11	10 February 1995	26 May 1995	16	Bruce Forsyth
12	2 February 1996	17 May 1996	16	Bruce Forsyth
13	5 January 1997	11 May 1997	17	Bruce Forsyth
14	16 January 1998	1 May 1998	16	Bruce Forsyth
15	22 January 1999	4 June 1999	16	Bruce Forsyth
16	7 September 2002	20 June 2003	12	Bruce Forsyth

=== Christmas Specials ===
Date	Presenter
27 December 1981	Bruce Forsyth
25 December 1982	Bruce Forsyth
25 December 1983	Bruce Forsyth
21 December 1984	Bruce Forsyth
20 December 1985	Bruce Forsyth
19 December 1986	Bruce Forsyth
