= Alicia Machado =

Venezuelan-American actress/TV host/singer/beauty queen

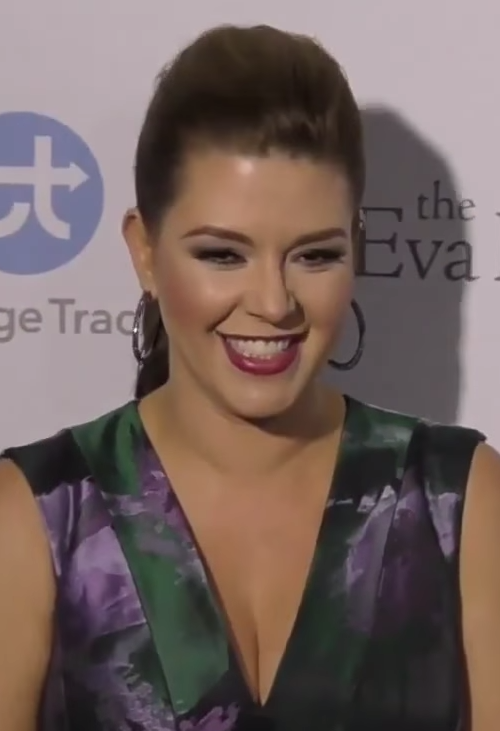
- Machado in 2016
- Born: Yoseph Alicia Machado Fajardo; December 6, 1976 (age 49); Maracay, Aragua, Venezuela
- Height: 1.71 m (5 ft 7 in)
- Children: 1
- Beauty pageant titleholder
- Title: Miss Venezuela 1995; Miss Universe 1996
- Major competitions: Miss Venezuela 1995 (Winner); Miss Universe 1996 (Winner)

Yoseph Alicia Machado Fajardo (Spanish pronunciation: [aˈlisja maˈtʃaðo]; born December 6, 1976) is a Venezuelan-American actress, tv host, singer and beauty queen who was crowned Miss Universe 1996, she previously crowned Miss Venezuela 1995. She was the fourth woman from Venezuela to be named Miss Universe.

== Early life ==
Machado was born in Maracay, Venezuela. Her father was a toy store owner who emigrated from Spain and her mother's family emigrated from Cuba prior to the Cuban revolution. Machado took to performing at an early age. She began dancing at age four and acting at age 12. Machado attended college for a year and a half but left to pursue modeling and appearing in commercials.

== Career ==
Machado won the 1995 Miss Maracay pageant, and then the 1995 Miss Venezuela pageant representing Yaracuy state and then the Miss Universe 1996 crown in Las Vegas. Early in her training, she refused plastic surgery recommended to her, notable in Venezuelan beauty pageant culture. The runner-up, Jacqueline Aguilera, also won the Miss World 1995 crown, marking the second time that two Venezuelans from the same pageant won two world titles. Machado's reign came as American businessman Donald Trump took ownership of the Miss Universe pageant. While preparing for Miss Universe, Machado underwent intense dieting. Machado said that, when she won, she weighed 116 pounds (53 kg) and was anorexic and bulimic.

During her reign as Miss Universe, Machado gained what she said was about 12 pounds (5.4 kg) in weight, drawing considerable press attention. The President of Miss Universe Organization denied that the organization was considering replacing her with runner-up, Taryn Mansell of Aruba. After mounting pressure to lose weight from Trump and other pageant officials, Machado asked Trump to assist her with orienting toward a healthier lifestyle. Trump arranged for 80 reporters to "watch [her] sweat" in a gym, which Machado later called "in very bad taste". This scandal catapulted her directly to world fame, making her the most popular Miss Universe in history.

In 1998, Machado had her first starring telenovela role as the title character in Samantha. In 2001, she had a small role on the international soap opera Secreto de Amor. During 2004–2005, she pursued a career as a TV commercial model with particular success in promoting a dieting product.

In 2005, Machado appeared on a Spanish reality show called La Granja de los celebrities, whose participation generated headlines in the press in Spain, Mexico, Miami and Venezuela, for having sex in front of the cameras with her partner on the program, Fernando Acaso, while still engaged to Venezuelan baseball player Bob Abreu. On February 19, 2006, Machado debuted on the Mexican reality show Cantando por un sueño ("Singing for a Dream").

Machado appeared in (and on the cover of) the February 2006 issue of Playboy magazine's Mexican edition, becoming the only Miss Universe to pose nude for that magazine. Machado was cast in the comedic soap opera Una familia con suerte where she played a woman who fell in love with her brother's enemy. The show began airing in Mexico in February 2011 and in the United States in October of that same year. She again posed nude for the July 2010 issue of the Mexican edition of Playboy.

On September 9, 2012, Machado was one of ten competitors on the third season of Mira quién baila. On November 18, 2012, Alicia won third place in the third season of Univision's dance competition Mira quién baila. In 2013, Machado starred as the protagonist of La Madame, a television serial produced by RTI Productions and RCN TV in Colombia. In February 2014, she joined Univision's beauty pageant Nuestra Belleza Latina 2014 as a mentor where she coached the participants on how to succeed in the modeling and television industry.

In 2017, she posed nude for PETA's "I'd Rather Go Naked Than Wear Fur," ad campaign.

In 2019, she was part of the cast of the play Divinas, she also participated in the Latin movie, He matado a mi marido ("I have killed my husband").

In 2021, she competed in the Colombian version of MasterChef Celebrity (Colombia).

On May 23, 2021, she premiered her celebrity interview show What's Up Alicia, produced by Machado. It will initially be broadcast in Venezuela, through Venevisión, to later be launched in other countries in Latin America such as Mexico, and the United States.

In 2021, Machado appeared as a contestant in the first season of the reality television series La casa de los famosos. She went on to win the competition with 40,586,129 votes. Subsequently, she appeared in the second and fifth seasons as a panelist on Sunday episodes, providing commentary on the events that took place throughout the week.

In 2025, Machado joined Telemundo's beauty pageant Miss Universe Latina, el reality as a captain of Team Emerald, guiding the contestants based on her own experience.

== Involvement in politics ==
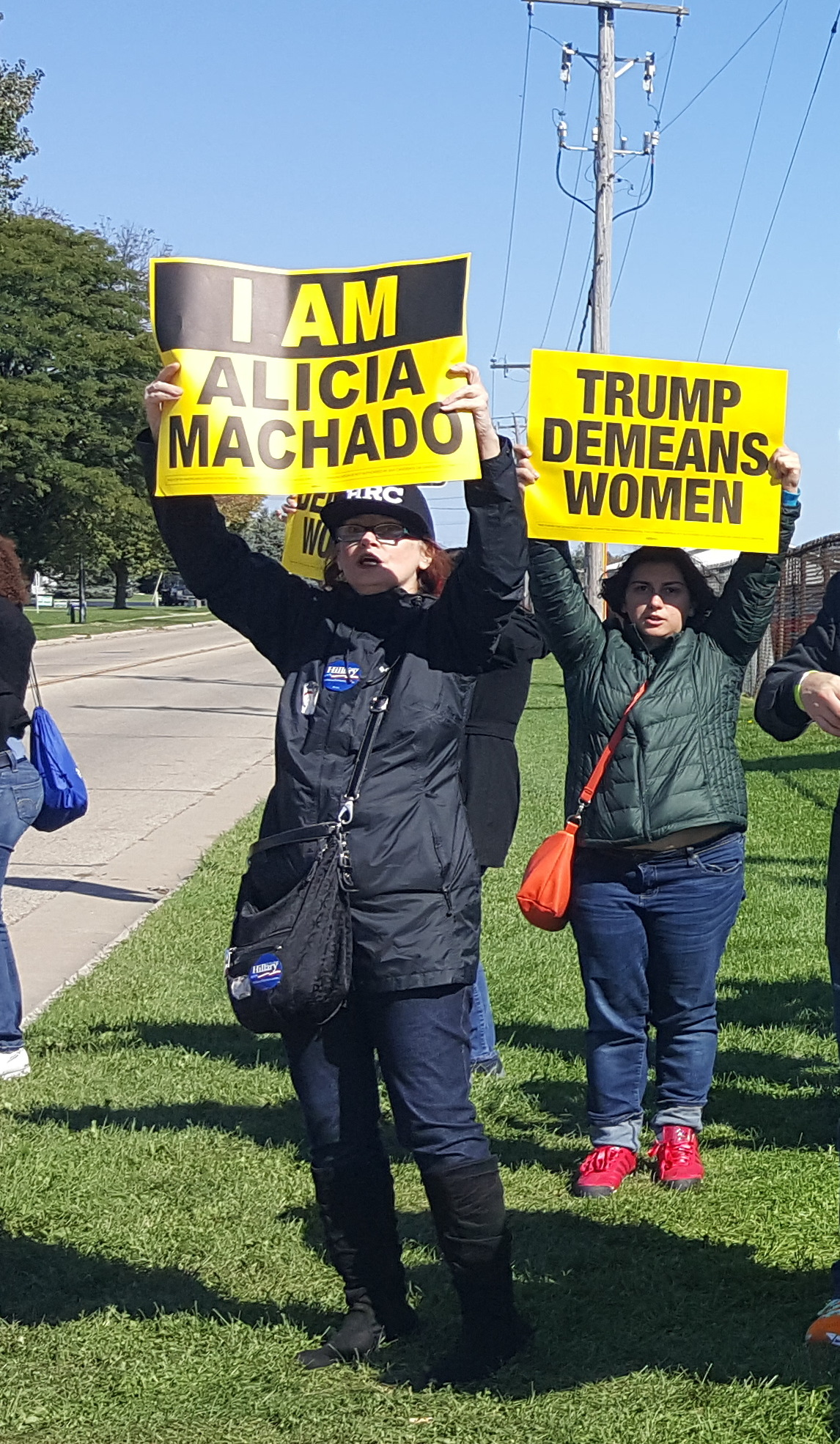
Anti-Trump protester with sign reading "I Am Alicia Machado" during Trump's 2016 presidential campaign.

In 1998, Machado publicly supported the presidential campaign of Henrique Salas Römer. In 2010 she criticized populist Venezuelan president Hugo Chávez in an interview with Playboy.

In July 2015, after Donald Trump launched his presidential campaign, Machado announced that she would publish a book detailing what she called his "abuses of power" and "racism". She said that, during her year as Miss Universe, Trump called her "Miss Piggy" because she gained weight and "Miss Housekeeping" because of her Hispanic background. Trump's spokeswoman denied that Trump had made those insults. Machado has repeatedly called Trump a "nazi rat", compared him to Hugo Chavez and Adolf Hitler, and said that he was capable of starting a new Holocaust.

On September 26, 2016, Hillary Clinton brought up Machado's statements against Trump during the first presidential debate. The following day, Trump responded on Fox and Friends, describing Machado as "impossible" and saying that "she gained a massive amount of weight and it was a real problem. We had a real problem. Not only that, her attitude, and we had a real problem with her." Later that week, Trump made a series of tweets in which he called her "disgusting," condemned Clinton's judgement for not "checking her past", falsely claimed she had appeared in a "sex tape", and baselessly accused Clinton of using her influence to help Machado become an American citizen.

The tweets were condemned in editorials in the Los Angeles Times and The Globe and Mail. John Cassidy of The New Yorker wrote that Trump's "original comments about Machado reeked of sexism and racism" while his subsequent series of tweets "highlighted, anew, his impulsiveness and lack of discipline." The following day, Clinton telephoned Machado to thank her for her support.

Beginning in June 2016, Machado publicly campaigned in support of Hillary Clinton. The Clinton campaign coordinated many of her media appearances, featured her in two online advertisements, and used her to introduce Clinton at a campaign rally.

== Personal life ==
In 1998, a Venezuelan judge accused Machado of threatening to kill him while he was presiding over a case against her then-boyfriend for attempted murder. Machado was also accused of driving the boyfriend's getaway car. Machado denied both accusations and was never charged with a crime. The controversy caused a media sensation in Venezuela unseen since the conviction of President Carlos Andrés Pérez. (Note: Multiple sources:)

Machado once dated professional baseball player Bobby Abreu; the couple later split, calling off their engagement.

In 2010, responding to being mocked on Twitter after mistakenly referring to North and South Korea as China, Machado closed her Twitter account and wrote, "I now have a lot of psychopaths on the account and it's best I start another one, kisses."

Machado has one daughter. In 2013, after being diagnosed with breast cancer, Machado underwent a double mastectomy.

In May 2016, Machado became a U.S. citizen.

In June 2019 in statements to the Hispanic show business program, Suelta la sopa, she talked about her bisexuality, claiming to have had girlfriends.

In November 2025, Machado drew criticism for racist remarks made during a livestream about Thai pageant organiser Nawat Itsaragrisil, who was embroiled in a controversy of his own at Miss Universe 2025, in which she referred to him as "that despicable Chinese", mocked people with "slanted eyes", and made derogatory remarks about Thailand. Her comments, seen as derogatory toward Asians, sparked backlash across social media and condemnation from pageant figures, including Filipino publicist Josh Yugen.

== Filmography ==
=== Television ===
Year	Title	Role	Notes
1997	The Nanny	Herself	
1998	Samantha	Samantha del Llano	Lead role
1999	Infierno en el paraíso	Marian Ordiales	Lead role
2000	Estamos Unidos	Mari	
2002	Mambo y canela	Canela	
2005	La Granja	Herself	Contestant; Finished 8th place
2007	Nuestra Belleza Latina 2007	Herself	Judge
2007	El Pantera	Diana Rodríguez	Season 1
2007	Amor sin maquillaje	Marina Fernández Rosales	
2009	Los simuladores	Camila	Episode: "El precio de la fama"
2009–2010	Hasta que el dinero nos separe	Karen Sandoval	Supporting role
2009–2010	Atrévete a soñar	Electra	Guest star
2011–2012	Una familia con suerte	Candelaria "Candy" López	
2012	2012 Premios Juventud	Herself	Host
2012	Mira quien baila	Herself	Contestant; Finished 3rd place
2012–2013	Porque el amor manda	Candela	Guest star
2013	La Madame	Madame Rochy "La Madame"	Lead role
2014	Nuestra Belleza Latina 2014	Herself	Mentor/team leader
2015	Lo imperdonable	Claudia Ordaz	
2021	MasterChef Celebrity México	Herself	Contestant
2021–present	La casa de los famosos	Herself	Housemate (season 1 winner) Panelist (seasons 2 and 5)
2021	Esta historia me suena	Nora	Episode: "Suelta mi mano"
2023	Juego de mentiras	Alejandra Edwards	
2023–present	Secretos de las indomables	Herself	Main cast
2024	Top Chef VIP	Herself	Contestant (season 3)
2025	Miss Universe Latina, el reality	Herself	Team captain

=== Films ===
Year	Title	Role	Notes
2006	Cansada de besar sapos	Cassandra	
2007	Dios o demonio	Giselle	

=== Theater ===
Year	Title	Role	Notes
2009	Un amante a la medida	Linda	
2010	Los Alacranes		
2010	Hairspray, El Musical	Velma	
2019	Divinas		

== Discography ==
Machado both wrote and produced her debut album, unusual in the genre.

- Alicia Machado (2004)
- Si se Acabara el Mundo (2010)

== Awards and nominations ==
=== Midia ===
Year	Category	Telenovela	Result
1998	Best New Actress	Samantha	Won
1998	It's the best history	Samantha	Won

=== Premios ACE ===
Year	Category	Telenovela	Result
1999	Best Revelation of the Year	Samantha	Won

=== Paseo de las Luminarias ===
Year	Nominee	Result
2010	In recognition of her artistic career in Mexico	Won

=== TVyNovelas Awards ===
Year	Category	Telenovela	Result
2012	Best Co-star Actress	Una familia con suerte	Nominated

=== Premios People en Español ===
Year	Category	Telenovela	Result
2012	Best Supporting Actress	Una familia con suerte	Nominated

== Notes ==
Awards and achievements
Preceded by (United States) Chelsi Smith	Miss Universe; 1996	Succeeded by (United States) Brook Lee
Preceded by Denyse Floreano	Miss Venezuela; 1995	Succeeded by Marena Bencomo
Preceded by Lody Attie	Miss Yaracuy; 1995	Succeeded by Romina Meraviglia
