= Irene Skliva =

Greek model and beauty queen (born 1978)

- Born: Irene Skliva; 4 April 1978 (age 48); Athens, Greece
- Height: 1.75 m (5 ft 9 in)
- Beauty pageant titleholder
- Title: Miss Hellas 1996; Miss World 1996
- Hair color: Brown
- Eye color: Green

Irene Skliva (Irini Skliva; Greek: Ειρήνη Σκλήβα; born 4 April 1978, in Athens, Greece) is a Greek model and beauty queen who was crowned Miss World 1996 in India. She was the first Greek to win the Miss World title, and the only Greek to win as of now.

== Miss World ==
After winning the title of "Miss Hellas" at the Miss Star Hellas pageant, she represented Greece in Bangalore, India during the highly regarded Miss World pageant in 1996 and was selected as Miss World 1996.

As an 18-year-old woman, she could not quite believe it was real: "I had the feeling it was just another rehearsal - in the rehearsals, in one rehearsal, they'd used me as the mock winner".

== Life after Miss World ==
After completing her year as Miss World, Skliva returned to Greece where she pursued a career in television and modeling, her face appearing on the covers of numerous Greek magazines such as Diva and LipStick. She has participated in some of the world's largest fashion shows in Athens, Milan and Munich. She is represented by Ace Models Agency.

== Filmography ==
=== Television ===
Year	Title	Role(s)	Notes
1991-1992	Turnkey with Vlassis Bonatsos	Herself (co-host)	Game show
1991-1993	Not the ANT1 News	Vanily	Variety show; season 2-3
1994	Behing the masks	Irini	Main role, 28 episodes
1996	National Beauty Pageant of Greece	Herself (contestant)	Title - Miss Hellas '96
1996	Miss World 1996	Herself (contestant)	Winner
2001	Playmate of the Year Greece	Herself (judge)	TV special

== Personal life ==
She got married in September 2002 and had her first daughter, in July 2003.

During the 2004 Summer Olympics, Skliva (like numerous other celebrities) left her signature on The Olive: The Tree of Athens, a sculptured olive tree located in the Water Plaza fun park which visitors flooded during the games, that represented the homecoming of the Olympics.

Awards and achievements
Preceded by (Venezuela) Jacqueline Aguilera	Miss World; 1996	Succeeded by (India) Diana Hayden
Preceded by (Croatia) Anica Martinović	Miss World Europe; 1996	Succeeded by (Turkey) Çağla Şikel
Preceded by Mairi Moziki	Miss Hellas; 1996	Succeeded by Evgenia Limantzaki
