= Rani Jeyraj =

Indian model

- Born: Kundal, Kanyakumari, Tamil Nadu, India
- Height: 1.75 m (5 ft 9 in)
- Beauty pageant titleholder
- Title: 1st Runner-up of Femina Miss India 1996
- Hair color: Black
- Eye color: Black
- Major competitions: Femina Miss India 1996 (1st Runner-up); Miss World 1996 (Top 5)

Rani Jeyraj is an Indian model and beauty pageant titleholder who was crowned Femina Miss India 1996. A native of Kundal village in Tirunelveli District, she was born to a middle class Christian Nadar family in Zambia. Her parents were teachers in Zambia

She attended secondary education at Bishop Cotton Girls' School, passing ISC Examination with distinction.
