= Jacqueline Aguilera =

Venezuelan model and beauty queen (born 1976)

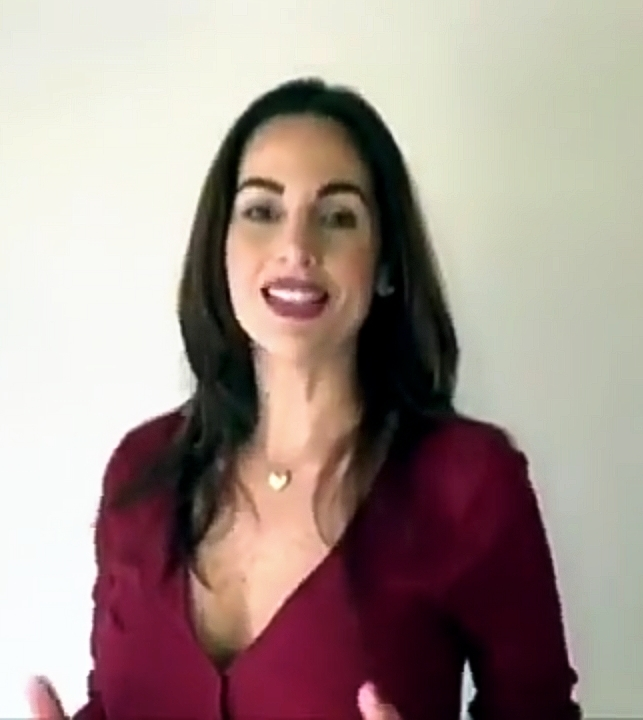
- Aguilera in 2018
- Born: Jacqueline María Aguilera Marcano; 17 November 1976 (age 49); Valencia, Carabobo, Venezuela
- Height: 1.80 m (5 ft 10 3/4 in)
- Beauty pageant titleholder
- Title: Top Model of the World 1995; Miss World Venezuela 1995; Miss World 1995
- Hair color: Black
- Eye color: Dark brown
- Major competitions: Top Model of the World 1995 (Winner); Miss Venezuela 1995 (Miss World Venezuela); Miss World 1995 (Winner) (Miss World Americas) (Miss Photogenic)

Jacqueline María Aguilera Marcano (born 17 November 1976 in Valencia, Carabobo) is a Venezuelan model and beauty queen who was crowned Miss World 1995 and she became the fifth woman from Venezuela to capture the Miss World crown.

== Pageant career ==
She participated in Top Model of the World 1995, held in Moscow, Russia, where she became Venezuela's first titleholder in history.

Aguilera competed in 1995 as Miss Nueva Esparta in her country's national beauty pageant, obtaining the title of Miss World Venezuela and the right to represent her country in Miss World 1995.

At the Miss World Pageant on 18 November 1995 in Sun City, South Africa, she won the crown as the 45th Miss World, as well as the Photogenic award. Former Miss World 1994 Aishwarya Rai handed over her crown to Aguilera after her reign as the Miss World for a year. She handed over her crown to Irene Skliva of Greece in the 1996 Miss World pageant, after being the Miss World for the year.

== Personal life ==
Presently, she operates a modeling agency in Venezuela and lives in Margarita Island, Venezuela.

Awards and achievements
Preceded by (India) Aishwarya Rai	Miss World; 1995	Succeeded by (Greece) Irene Skliva
Preceded by (Venezuela) Irene Ferreira	Miss World Americas; 1995	Succeeded by (Colombia) Carolina Arango
Preceded by (France) Claudine Obert	Top Model of the World; 1995	Succeeded by (Dominican Republic) Selinée Méndez
Preceded by (Miranda (state)) Irene Ferreira	Miss World Venezuela; 1995	Succeeded by (Nueva Esparta) Ana Cepinska
