= Miss World 1996 =

Beauty pageant edition

- Miss World 1996 Titlecard
- Date: 23 November 1996
- Presenters: Richard Steinmetz; Ruby Bhatia
- Venue: M. Chinnaswamy Stadium, Bengaluru, India
- Broadcaster: E!; Zee TV
- Entrants: 88
- Placements: 10
- Debuts: Bonaire; Bosnia and Herzegovina; Macedonia
- Withdrawals: Bahamas; Barbados; Bermuda; Cayman Islands; Denmark
- Returns: Grenada; Kenya; Nigeria; Uganda; Uruguay; Yugoslavia
- Winner: Irene Skliva; Greece
- Personality: Daisy Reyes (Philippines)
- Best National Costume: Anuska Prado (Brazil)
- Photogenic: Ana Cepinska (Venezuela)

Miss World 1996, the 46th edition of the Miss World pageant, took place at the M. Chinnaswamy Stadium, Bengaluru, India on 23 November 1996.

At the end of the event, Irene Skliva of Greece was crowned as Miss World 1996 by Jacqueline Aguilera of Venezuela. Skliva was the first Greek to win the title. The first and second runners-up was Carolina Arango of Colombia and Anuska Prado of Brazil.

Contestants from eighty-eighty countries and territories participated in this year's pageant. The pageant was hosted by Richard Steinmetz and Ruby Bhatia.

== Background ==
=== Controversy ===
The event was organised by ABCL which was led by Amitabh Bachchan. The beauty pageant saw resistance by several groups due to the perceived culture clash. However, due to support of the local government, the event was held successfully.

=== Selection of participants ===
==== Debuts, returns, and withdrawals ====
This edition saw the debut of Bonaire, Bosnia and Herzegovina, and Macedonia, and the return of Grenada, Kenya, Nigeria, Uganda, Uruguay and Yugoslavia; Grenada, which last competed in 1970, Yugoslavia last competed in 1991, Uganda and Urugauy last competed in 1993 and Kenya and Nigeria last competed in 1994.

Bahamas, Barbados, Bermuda, Cayman Islands and Denmark, withdrew from the competition.

== Results ==
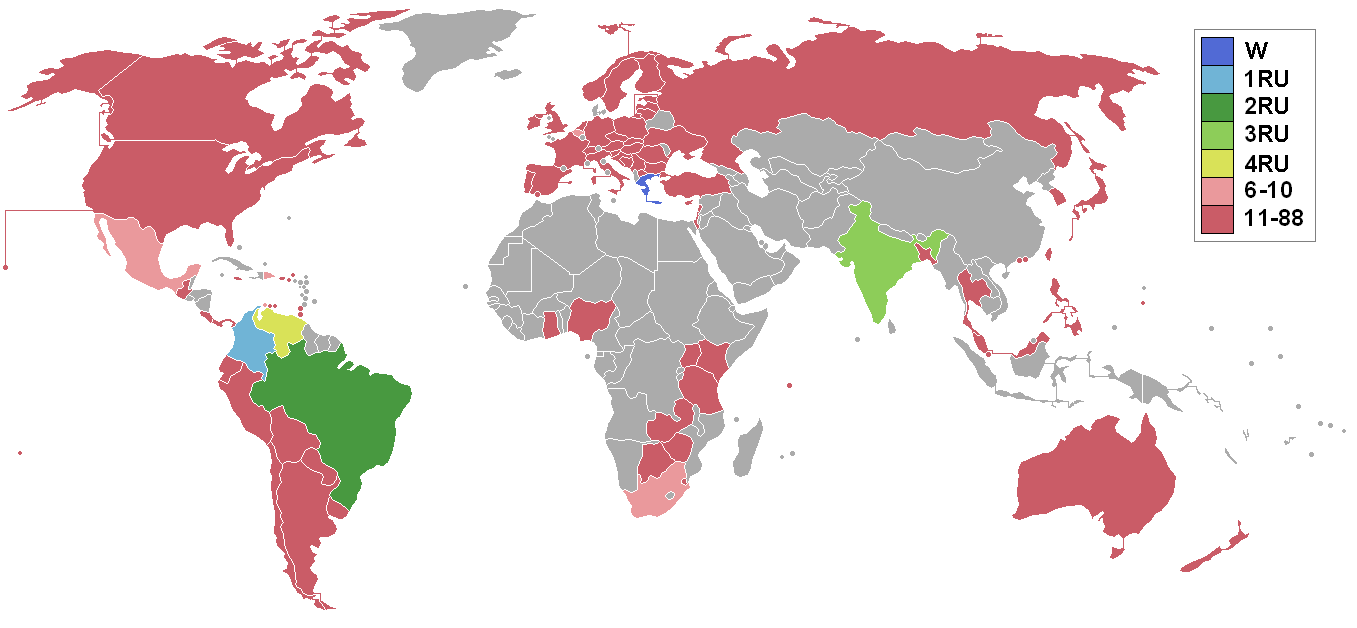
Countries and territories which sent delegates and results for Miss World 1996

=== Placements ===
Placement	Contestant
Miss World 1996	Greece – Irene Skliva
1st Runner-Up	Colombia – Carolina Arango
2nd Runner-Up	Brazil – Anuska Prado
Top 5	India – Rani Jeyraj; Venezuela – Ana Cepinska
Top 10	Aruba – Afranina Henriquez; Belgium – Laurence Borremans; Dominican Republic – Idelsa Núñez; Mexico – Yessica Salazar; South Africa – Peggy-Sue Khumalo

==== Continental Queens of Beauty ====
Continental Group	Contestant
Africa	South Africa – Peggy-Sue Khumalo
Americas	Colombia – Carolina Arango
Asia & Oceania	India – Rani Jeyraj
Caribbean	Aruba – Afranina Henriquez
Europe	Greece – Irene Skliva

== Judges ==
- Andre Sekulic
- Linda Pétursdóttir – Miss World 1988 from Iceland
- Vijay Mallya
- Marlene Cardin
- Aamir Khan
- Aishwarya Rai – Miss World 1994 from India
- Sanath Jayasuriya
- Ninibeth Leal – Miss World 1991 from Venezuela
- Tom Nuyens – Mister World 1996 from Belgium
- Parmeshwar Godrej

== Contestants ==
Country/Territory	Contestant	Age (Note: Ages at the time of the pageant)
Argentina	Fernanda Fernández	18
Aruba	Afranina Henriquez	20
Australia	Nicole Smith	24
Austria	Bettina Buxbaumer	23
Bangladesh	Rehnuma Dilruba	20
Belgium	Laurence Borremans	18
Bolivia	Andrea Forti	19
Bonaire	Jhane Landwier	18
Bosnia and Herzegovina	Belma Zvrko	18
Botswana	Joyce Manase	20
Brazil	Anuska Prado	20
British Virgin Islands	Ayana Glasgow	21
Bulgaria	Viara Kamenova	21
Canada	Michelle Weswaldi	19
Chile	Luz Francisca Valenzuela	20
Colombia	Carolina Arango	19
Costa Rica	Natalia Carvajal	21
Croatia	Vanja Rupena	18
Curação	Yandra Faulborn	19
Cyprus	Maria Papaprodromou	19
Czech Republic	Petra Minářová	18
Dominican Republic	Idelsa Núñez Torres	21
Ecuador	Jennifer Graham	19
Estonia	Mari-Liis Kapustin	18
Finland	Hanna Hirvonen	20
France	Séverine Derouallé	22
French Polynesia (Note: Competed as Tahiti in the pageant)	Hinerava Hiro	18
Germany	Melanie Ernst	18
Ghana	Sheila Azuntaba	19
Gibraltar	Samantha Lane	17
Greece	Irene Skliva	18
Grenada	Aria Johnson	25
Guam	Aileen Maravilla	23
Guatemala	María Gabriela Rosales	19
Holland	Petra Hoost	20
Hong Kong	Chillie Poon	24
Hungary	Andrea Deák	19
India	Rani Jeyraj	21
Ireland	Niamh Redmond	19
Israel	Talia Lewenthal	18
Italy	Mara de Gennaro	24
Jamaica	Selena Delgado	21
Japan	Miyuki Fujii	21
Kenya	Pritpal Kulwant Dhamu	18
Latvia	Anta Dukere	22
Lebanon	Nisrine Sami Nasser	22
Lithuania	Daiva Anužytė	18
Macau	Guiomar Madeira da Silva Pedruco	21
Macedonia	Vera Mesterovic	17
Malaysia	Qu-an How Cheok Kuan	20
Mexico	Yessica Salazar	22
New Zealand	Kelly-Rose Mischiewski	21
Nigeria	Emma Komlosy	19
Norway	Eva Sjøholt	24
Panama	Norma Élida Pérez	21
Paraguay	María Ingrid Götze	22
Peru	Mónica Chacón de Vettori	21
Philippines	Daisy Reyes	20
Poland	Agnieszka Zielińska	20
Portugal	Ana Mafalda Santos	21
Puerto Rico	Marissa de la Caridad Hernández	21
Romania	Carmen Radoi	21
Russia	Viktoriya Tsapitsina	17
Seychelles	Christina Pillay	22
Singapore	Carol Tan	19
Slovakia	Linda Lenčová	18
Slovenia	Alenka Vindiš	18
South Africa	Peggy-Sue Khumalo	21
South Korea (Note: Competed as Korea in the pageant)	Seol Soo-jin	21
Spain	Patricia Ruiz Fernández	19
Swaziland	Olive Healy	22
Sweden	Åsa Johansson	20
Switzerland	Melanie Winiger	17
Taiwan (Note: Also known as the Republic of China)	Chen Hsiao-Fen	23
Tanzania	Shose Akare Sinare	20
Thailand	Sirinya Burbridge	17
Trinidad and Tobago	Sharda Ramlogan	23
Turkey	Serpil Sevilay Öztürk	19
Uganda	Sheba Kerere	19
Ukraine	Nataliya Shvachko	20
United Kingdom	Rachael Liza Warner	22
United States	Kelly Webber	20
United States Virgin Islands	Emoliere Williams	18
Uruguay	Claudia Verónica Gallaretta Olmedo	19
Venezuela	Ana Cepinska Miszczak	18
Yugoslavia	Slavica Krivokuća	18
Zambia	Alice Banda	21
Zimbabwe	Nomsa Ndiweni	19

== Notes ==
=== Withdrawals ===
- Bahamas – Nicole Symonette could not compete due to financial problems with the Miss Bahamas Committee that ran Miss Bahamas for both Miss World and Miss Universe and thus was only able to send a representative to Miss Universe 1996.
- Cayman Islands – Due to financial problems
