= Miss World 1995 =

Beauty pageant in Sun City, South Africa

- Miss World 1995 Titlecard
- Date: 18 November 1995
- Presenters: Richard Steinmetz
- Entertainment: Caught in the Act
- Venue: Sun City Entertainment Center, Sun City, South Africa
- Broadcaster: E!; SABC
- Entrants: 84
- Placements: 10
- Withdrawals: China; Iceland; Kenya; Mauritius; Nigeria; Saint Lucia; Saint Vincent and the Grenadines; Sri Lanka
- Returns: Aruba; Barbados; Bermuda; Lithuania; Zambia
- Winner: Jacqueline Aguilera; Venezuela
- Personality: Toyin Raji (Nigeria)
- Best National Costume: Anica Martinović (Croatia)
- Photogenic: Jacqueline Aguilera (Venezuela)

Miss World 1995, the 45th edition of the Miss World pageant, was held on 18 November 1995 for the fourth straight year at the Sun City Entertainment Centre in Sun City, South Africa. The 1995 pageant attracted 84 delegates. The pageant was hosted by Richard Steinmetz, Jeff Trachta and Bobbie Eakes. Bruce Forsyth and supermodels Linda Evangelista and Beverly Peele acted as presenters. Aside from Sun City; Dubai, United Arab Emirates, and the Comoros hosted some segments of the show.

At the end of the event, Jacqueline Aguilera of Venezuela was crowned Miss World 1995 by the previous winner, Aishwarya Rai of India. It is the fifth victory of Venezuela in the pageant's history. Runner-Up was Anica Martinović representing Croatia and third was Michelle Khan representing Trinidad and Tobago.

== Selection of participants ==
=== Replacements ===
Miss World Denmark 1995, Anja Nielsen was supposed to represent Denmark during Miss World pageant 1995. But on the flight to South Africa, she got very sick and had to return home. Tina Knudsen replaced her by Emergency.

=== Returns, and, withdrawals ===
This edition saw the return of Aruba, Barbados, Bermuda, Lithuania and Zambia; Barbados, which last competed in 1990, Zambia last competed in 1992 and Aruba, Bermuda and Lithuania last competed in 1993.

China, Kenya, Mauritius, Saint Lucia, Saint Vincent and the Grenadines and Sri Lanka, withdrew from the competition. Sigríður Ósk Kristinsdóttir of Iceland withdrew due to lack of sponsorship and founding, Toyin Enitan Raji of Nigeria, she was forced to withdraw from the contest due political reasons; a few hours after being given the Miss Personality on 16 November, she received telephone threats over the execution by Nigeria's military regime of nine political activists a week prior. Yugoslavia once again attempted to return to competition with the winner of Miss Ju 1995, Tijana Sremčević after the peace Dayton Agreement were signed and International sanctions against Yugoslavia were lift, but she withdraw due lack of autorization of MWO.

== Results ==
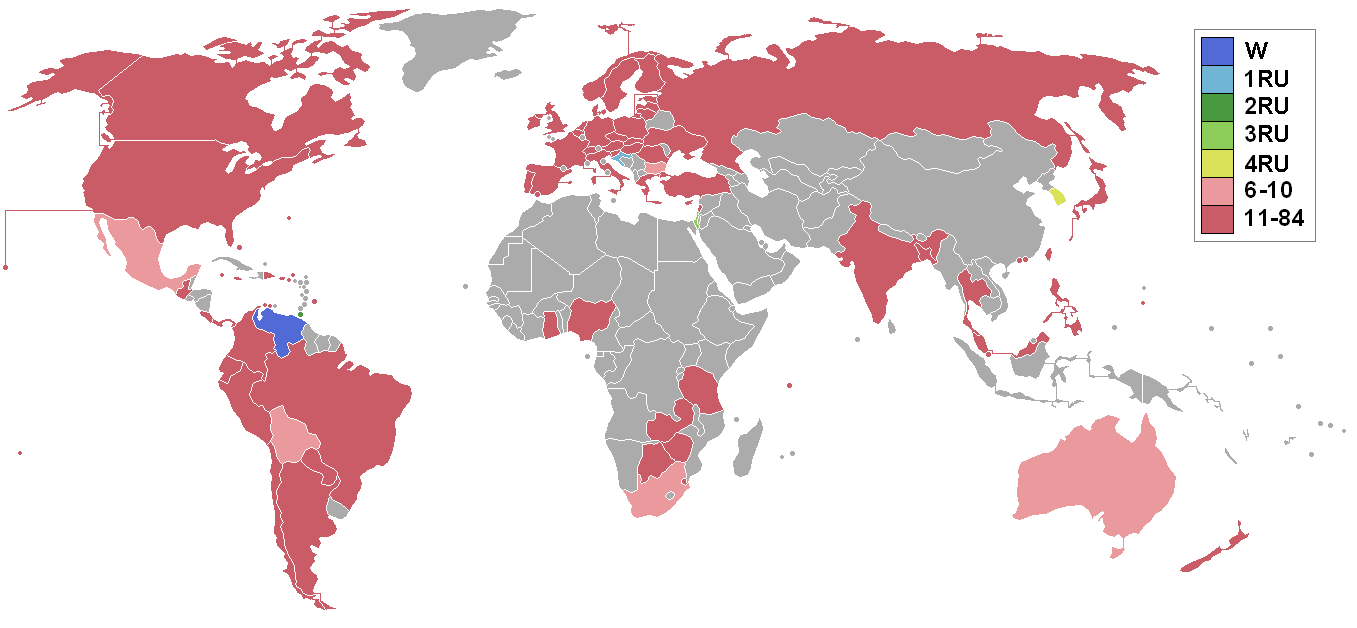
Countries and territories which sent delegates and results for Miss World 1995

=== Placements ===
Placement	Contestant
Miss World 1995	Venezuela – Jacqueline Aguilera
1st Runner-Up	Croatia – Anica Martinović
2nd Runner-Up	Trinidad and Tobago – Michelle Khan
Top 5	Israel – Miri Bohadana; South Korea – Choi Yoon-young
Top 10	Australia – Melissa Porter; Bolivia – Carla Morón; Bulgaria – Evgenia Kalkandzhieva; Mexico – Alejandra Quintero; South Africa – Bernelee Daniell

==== Continental Queens of Beauty ====
Continental Group	Contestant
Africa	South Africa – Bernelee Daniell
Americas	Venezuela – Jacqueline Aguilera
Asia & Oceania	South Korea – Choi Yoon-young
Caribbean	Trinidad and Tobago – Michelle Khan
Europe	Croatia – Anica Martinović

== Pageant ==
=== Judges ===
- Astrid Carolina Herrera – Miss World 1984 from Venezuela
- Bruce Forsyth
- Christopher Lee
- Eric Morley – chairman and CEO of Miss World Organization
- Emma Samms
- Michael Winner
- Amitabh Bachchan
- Fanie de Villiers
- Josie Borain
- Mariasela Alvarez – Miss World 1982 from Dominican Republic

== Contestants ==
84 contestants competed for the title.

Country/Territory	Contestant	Age (Note: Ages at the time in the pageant)	Hometown
Argentina	María Lorena Jensen	20	Buenos Aires
Aruba	Tessa Pieterz	–	Oranjestad
Australia	Melissa Porter	21	Perth
Austria	Elizabeth Unfried	–	Vienna
Bahamas	Loleta Marie Smith	–	Nassau
Bangladesh	Yasmin Bilkis Sathi	–	Dhaka
Barbados	Rashi Holder	–	Bridgetown
Belgium	Véronique De Kock	19	Schoten
Bermuda	Renita Minors	22	Hamilton
Bolivia	Carla Morón	20	Santa Cruz de la Sierra
Botswana	Monica Somolekae	–	Gaborone
Brazil	Elessandra Dartora	–	Paraná
British Virgin Islands	Chandi Trott	–	Road Town
Bulgaria	Evgenia Kalkandjieva	20	Sofia
Canada	Alissa Lehinki	–	Alberta
Cayman Islands	Tasha Ebanks	22	George Town
Chile	Tonka Tomicic	19	Antofagasta
Colombia	Diana María Figueroa	18	Tolima
Costa Rica	Shasling Navarro	–	San José
Croatia	Anica Martinović	19	Zagreb
Curaçao	Danique Regales	22	Willemstad
Cyprus	Isabella Giorgallou	–	Nicosia
Czech Republic	Kateřina Kasalová	19	Pardubice
Denmark	Tine Bay	22	Copenhagen
Dominican Republic	Patricia Bayonet	20	Santiago de los Caballeros
Ecuador	Ana Fabiola Trujillo	–	Guayas
Estonia	Mari-Lin Poom	17	Tallinn
Finland	Terhi Koivisto	17	Helsinki
France	Helene Lantoine	22	Étaples
French Polynesia (Note: Competed as Tahiti in the pageant)	Timeri Baudry	–	Papeete
Germany	Isabell Brauer	–	Baden-Württemberg
Ghana	Manuela Medie	–	Accra
Gibraltar	Monique Chiara	18	Gibraltar
Greece	Maria Boziki	–	Athens
Guam	Joylyn Muñoz	18	Barrigada
Guatemala	Sara Elizabeth Sandoval	–	Guatemala City
Holland	Didi Schackmann	17	Wijchen
(British Hong Kong) Hong Kong	Shirley Chau	24	Hong Kong
Hungary	Ildiko Veinbergen	21	Székesfehérvár
India	Preeti Mankotia	–	Punjab
Ireland	Joanne Black	21	Cavan
Israel	Miri Bohadana	18	Sderot
Italy	Rosanna Santoli	22	Pomezia
Jamaica	Imani Duncan	19	Kingston
Japan	Mari Kubo	–	Tokyo
Latvia	Ieva Meliņa	–	Riga
Lebanon	Julia Syriani	18	Beirut
Lithuania	Gabrielė Bartkutė	20	Vilnius
Macau	Geraldina Pedruco	24	Macau
Malaysia	Trincy Low	19	Kuala Lumpur
Mexico	Alejandra Quintero	19	Nuevo León
New Zealand	Sarah Brady	19	Auckland
Norway	Inger Lise Ebeltoft	18	Tromsø
Panama	Marisela Moreno	23	Panama City
Paraguay	Patricia Serafini	–	–
Peru	Paola Dellepiane	18	Lima
Philippines	Reham Snow Tago	18	Manila
Poland	Ewa Tylecka	21	Dzierżoniów
Portugal	Suzana Robalo	–	Lisbon
Puerto Rico	Swanni Quiñones	21	Guaynabo
Romania	Dana Delia Pintilie	–	Bucharest
Russia	Elena Bazina	17	Moscow
Seychelles	Shirley Low-Meng	–	Victoria
Singapore	Jacqueline Chew	–	Singapore
Slovakia	Zuzana Špatinová	19	Bratislava
Slovenia	Teja Boškin	21	Ljubljana
South Africa	Bernelee Daniell	22	Pretoria
South Korea (Note: Competed as Korea in the pageant)	Choi Yoon-young	21	Seoul
Spain	Candelaria Rodríguez	21	Tenerife
Swaziland	Mandy Saulus	–	Mbabane
Sweden	Jeanette Hassel	–	Stockholm
Switzerland	Stephanie Berger	17	Männedorf
Taiwan (Note: Also known as the Republic of China)	Hsu Chun-Chun	–	Taipei
Tanzania	Emily Adolf Fred	–	–
Thailand	Yasumin Leautamornwattana	–	–
Trinidad and Tobago	Michelle Khan	23	Port of Spain
Turkey	Demet Şener	18	Istanbul
Ukraine	Nataliya Shvachiy	–	Kyiv
United Kingdom	Shauna Gunn	22	Newtonbuttler
United States	Jill Ankuda	19	El Paso
United States Virgin Islands	Roshini Nibbs	–	Charlotte Amalie
Venezuela	Jacqueline Aguilera	19	Valencia
Zambia	Miryana Bujisic	17	Lusaka
Zimbabwe	Dionne Best	–	Harare

== Notes ==
=== Withdrawals ===
- Saint Vincent and the Grenadines - Cornice Yearwood
- Sri Lanka - Shivani Vasagam - Due to lack of sponsorship and founding.

=== Did not compete ===
- Namibia - Patricia Burt - Due to lack of sponsorship and founding.
- Nepal - Sumi Khadka - Due to lack of sponsorship and founding.
- Uganda - Phiona Piloya

=== Replacements ===
- Czech Republic – The winner of Miss Czech Republic 1995, Monika Zídková was supposed to be the Czech representative at Miss World 1995 & Miss Universe 1996, but her victory at Miss Europe 1995 pageant prevented her to participate due contractual duties. Kateřina Kasalová first Vice-Miss Czech Republic 1995 replaced her.
- Hong Kong – Miss Hong Kong 1995–1996, Winnie Young couldn't compete internationally due her American citizenship issue.
- Uganda – Miss Uganda 1995, Betty Nantunga couldn't compete at Miss World 1995 due to family disapproval. She was replaced by her first princess Phiona Piloya.
- Ukraine – The winner of Miss Ukraine 1995, Vlada Litovchenko couldn't participate due to the fact that she was a married woman with one child. The 2nd runner up of Miss Europe 1994, Nataliya Shvachiy replaced her.
