= BBC Igbo =

Igbo-language part of the BBC World Service

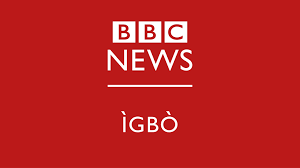
- Type: Radio network and website
- Country: United Kingdom
- Availability: International
- Headquarters: Lagos
- Owner: BBC
- Launch date: 19 February 2018
- Official website: www.bbc.com/igbo/
- Language: Igbo

BBC Igbo is the Igbo language service of BBC World Service meant primarily for the Igbo-speaking communities in the south-east, South-south of Nigeria and Igbo people in diaspora. It is part of the 12 new language services added to the BBC services and the other languages are Afaan Oromo, Amharic, Gujarati, Yoruba, Korean, Marathi, Pidgin, Punjabi, Telugu and Tigrinya.

== History ==
BBC Igbo was launched on 19 February 2018 by the BBC. This was part of the expansion project that accommodated additional twelve new languages. The services was funded by the United Kingdom Government through the Foreign and Commonwealth Office (FCO) with an investment of 289 million pounds. This expansion is called the BBC biggest expansion since the 1940s and the achievement of BBC Hausa that was introduced sixty years ago brought about the introduction of Igbo language. Tony Hall, the BBC Director General remarked that:

This is a historic day for the BBC, as we announce the biggest expansion of the World Service since the 1940s. The BBC World Service is a jewel in the crown – for the BBC and for Britain.

Also, the BBC head of West Africa, Oluwatoyosi Ogunseye explain the importance of adding more local languages to the BBC services. He said that:

We have had BBC Hausa [mainly spoken in northern Nigeria] for decades and we've seen the impact it had with its audience...When we look at Nigeria we have a multicultural society and the BBC felt that it was very important to give all the a platform to communicate, a platform to interact

== Broadcasting ==
The BBC Igbo was first aired with an interview with the wife of Biafra Separatist, Nnamdi Kanu. The news outlet will report news from a fair point of view in addition with trending topics in sports, entertainment, business, health, education and women purely in the Igbo language. The Editorial Lead of the project, Peter Okwoche explained that:

The Igbo service would be telling stories from their own region, the Igbo speaking area of Nigeria, to the rest of Nigeria and to the rest of the world...

Also, there is a 60-second audio summary of the activities of the BBC Igbo on BBC Minute twice daily.

The broadcasting operation is digital and includes short-format audio, video, graphics, and illustrations.

== Media centre ==
The BBC Bureau in Lagos state is the headquarters of the BBC Igbo and other two new services; BBC Pidgin and BBC Yoruba. The bureau was commissioned in March 2018 following the establishment of additional three new Languages in Nigeria. It consists of a TV studio, two radio stations and it can accommodate up to 200 people. It is also known as the headquarters for BBC in West Africa.

Jamie Angus, Director of the BBC World Service, was available during the commissioning of the bureau and he said that:

It's wonderful to be here to open this bureau, which will be the headquarters for our operation across West Africa. It will be a beacon for our journalism and as such I am delighted to announce our mentorship and internship scheme for up-and-coming journalists. This is part of BBC's contribution to the growth of media best practice and professionalism in Nigeria, and the fight against ‘Fake News’ – and we’ll benefit from the young journalists’ insight into West Africa.

== See also ==
- BBC Urdu
- BBC Persian
- BBC Bangla
- BBC Somali
- BBC Hausa
- BBC Yoruba
