= BBC Yoruba =

Yoruba-language part of the BBC World Service

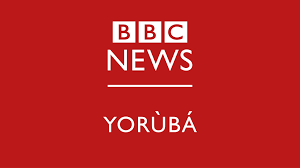
- Type: Radio network and website
- Country: United Kingdom
- Availability: International
- Headquarters: Lagos
- Owner: BBC
- Launch date: 19 February 2018
- Official website: www.bbc.com/yoruba/
- Language: Yoruba

BBC Yoruba is the Yoruba language service of the BBC World Service meant primarily for the Yoruba-speaking communities in Nigeria, Benin Republic, Togo and Yoruba speakers in diaspora. It is part of the 12 new language services incorporated by the BBC World Service. The other languages are Afaan Oromo, Amharic, Gujarati, Igbo, Korean, Marathi, Pidgin, Punjabi, Telugu and Tigrinya.

== History ==
BBC Yoruba was launched on 19 February 2018 by the BBC. This was part of the expansion to accommodate twelve new languages under the funding of United Kingdom Government through the Foreign and Commonwealth Office (FCO) with an investment of 289 million pounds. This expansion is termed the BBC biggest expansion since the 1940's and it incorporated Yoruba language and few other Nigerian languages because of the achievement of BBC Hausa that was introduced sixty years ago. The BBC Director General, Tony Hall, said in part that:

This is a historic day for the BBC, as we announce the biggest expansion of the World Service since the 1940s. The BBC World Service is a jewel in the crown – for the BBC and for Britain.

Also, the former BBC head of West Africa, Oluwatoyosi Ogunseye stressed the importance of adding local languages to the BBC services. She remarked that:

We have had BBC Hausa [mainly spoken in northern Nigeria] for decades and we've seen the impact it had with its audience...When we look at Nigeria we have a multicultural society and the BBC felt that it was very important to give all the a platform to communicate, a platform to interact

== Broadcast ==
The BBC Yoruba was first aired with an interview with Wole Soyinka over the remarks made by former leaders Olusegun Obasanjo and Ibrahim Babangida with Soyinka saying that he would never associate himself with Obasanjo's national coalition.

Also, the news outlet will report news from a neutral point of view in addendum with trending topics in sports, entertainment, business, health, education and women purely in the Yoruba language. The Editorial Lead of the project, Peter Okwoche explained that:

One of the most exciting things for me is to tell our stories in our own language and I think there is something standard about that, something original about that and that's what these two services are going to be doing.

Lastly, there is a 60-second audio summary of the activities of the BBC Yoruba on BBC Minute twice daily.

== Media centre ==
The BBC Bureau in Lagos State is the media centre of the BBC Yoruba and other two new services; BBC Pidgin and BBC Igbo. The bureau was opened in March 2018 following the establishment of additional three new Languages in Nigeria. It has a TV studio, two radio stations and a place that can accommodate up to 200 people. It is also regarded as the headquarters for BBC in West Africa. Jamie Angus, Director of the BBC World Service, was present during the commissioning of the bureau and he said in part that:

It's wonderful to be here to open this bureau, which will be the headquarters for our operation across West Africa. It will be a beacon for our journalism and as such I am delighted to announce our mentorship and internship scheme for up-and-coming journalists. This is part of BBC's contribution to the growth of media best practice and professionalism in Nigeria, and the fight against ‘Fake News’ – and we’ll benefit from the young journalists’ insight into West Africa.

== See also ==
- BBC Urdu
- BBC Persian
- BBC Bangla
- BBC Somali
- BBC Hausa
- BBC Igbo
