= Miss Nigeria =

Scholarship pageant

- Formation: 1957
- Type: Beauty pageant
- Headquarters: Lagos
- Location: Nigeria
- Pageant organiser: Daily Times
- Website: missnigeria.ng

Miss Nigeria is an annual pageant showcasing positive attributes of Nigerian women, and awarding university scholarships. The winner is expected to portray exemplary qualities whilst serving as a role model to young women in the country. The pageant is currently owned by Daily Times publisher Fidelis Anosike.

The current titleholder is lawyer Doris Ogah, who represented the South-South region.

== History ==
The then-Nigerian Printing and Publishing Company - publishers of national newspaper Daily Times - established the Miss Nigeria franchise which originally started as a photo contest in 1957. Contestants submitted photographs to the publication's Lagos office where finalists were shortlisted; those successful were invited to compete in the live final - which at the time did not include a swimsuit competition - at the Lagos Island Club. UAC employee Grace Oyelude won the maiden edition of Miss Nigeria, and would later use part of her £200 prize money to travel to England where she studied Nursing.

Contrary to popular belief, Julie Coker was not the first Miss Nigeria – the school teacher had actually won Miss Western Nigeria. However, she did compete in the contest the year after Oyelude's reign, but lost to office clerk Helen Anyamaeluna. Former seamstress Nene Etule remains the only non-Nigerian to have won the contest; she was eligible as the Southern Cameroons were under Nigerian constitution in 1959. The following year the contest was briefly renamed 'Miss Independence' to commemorate the country's independence from British rule, and WNTV continuity announcer Rosemary Anieze was crowned in a ceremony which included Coker as one of the judges.

After the new millennium, Miss Nigeria became a shadow of its former self, and the contest was placed on hold in 2004. Prior to this, no winner was crowned after Clara Ojo's victory from 1994 to 1998 due to the organiser's incapability to convene a pageant during this time. To date, Ojo remains the longest-serving Miss Nigeria (Although no contest was held from 2004 to 2010, Ene Lawani had already ceased ceremonial duties long before the franchise was purchased from the Daily Times). No winner was crowned for seven years after Stella Owivri until the pageant was revamped in 1977 when reigning Miss World Cindy Breakspeare crowned Toyin Monney.

In 2010, after a six-year attempt, AOE Events and Entertainment, headed by former MBGN Nike Oshinowo were brought into the Miss Nigeria franchise by Daily Times. For the first time in its history, entry was open to women in the diaspora, and inspired by Miss America, Oshinowo relaunched Miss Nigeria as a scholarship programme which offered free tuition to first, second, and third-place winners, with the Miss Nigeria titleholder receiving a scholarship to study at any university worldwide. The new Miss Nigeria now included a reality show The Making of a Queen which saw contestants compete in various tasks synonymous with Nigerian women including cooking on outdoor firewood stoves, hostessing, and haggling with market traders, with a number of contestants facing eviction each week. Evening gowns were made from traditional African fabrics and, most notably, the swimsuit competition was discontinued. The pageant ran for two years before the organisation of the pageant was taken over by Beth Model Management CEO and former Miss Nigeria UK, Elizabeth Elohor Isiorho in 2012. Elizabeth stopped organising the pageant in 2014.

In 2016 Miss Nigeria established the Green Girl Project, a community development initiative aimed at empowering young women to become facilitators of sustainable practices towards ensuring a clean and peaceful environment. It also aims to give young women a platform to become agents of change for the environment.

== International level ==
In 1963, Miss Nigeria 1962 Yemi Idowu became the first winner to represent the country at Miss United Nations where she reached the semi-final. The following year, salesgirl Edna Park became the only Miss Nigeria at Miss Universe, but is best remembered for disrupting the evening when she collapsed on stage after failing to reach the top fifteen. She was carried away by policemen and contest officials, and spent the night in a Miami hospital under sedation where she was consoled by Nneka Onyegbula, wife of the Nigerian ambassador, who reportedly stated "All the judges are white, and they aren't really competent to judge dark girls' beauty". Since Park, no other Miss Nigeria has competed at Miss Universe, although the country returned to the international stage when Art student Rosaline Balogun became the first official Miss Nigeria at Miss World in 1967. No pageant was held in 1969, yet London-based secretary Morenike Faribido was unofficially handpicked to use the "Miss Nigeria" title and represent the country at Miss World. The Daily Times were not involved in this process

Several Miss Nigeria winners were expected to compete at Miss World but never attended due to lack of sponsors, including Syster Jack (1980), Rita Martins (1982), and Rita Anuku (1986). Schoolteacher Rosemary Okeke (1985) was the last Miss Nigeria at Miss World, while Law student Nwando Okwuosa (2003) was the last to compete internationally at Miss International.

With the gradual demise of Daily Times and rivalry with Sliverbird's Most Beautiful Girl in Nigeria, Daily Times lost their license to send delegates to Miss World and Miss Universe.

== Competition ==
Contestants are required to be unmarried, childless, and not pregnant, with a good command of English, and of Nigerian citizenship. They should be between the ages of 18 and 25 years old, of good health, and of good character with no tattoos or piercings apart from ears.

The competition starts with a call to entry where interested participants acquire registration forms before screening exercises commence. Judges select a number of contestants for orientation camp lasting a total of 2–3 weeks where contestants are given tasks to test their skills in different areas. They are also given training in various activities to empower them, develop their entrepreneurship skills, and expose them to different industries enabling them to understand and begin to learn the role of an ambassador. Originally, contestants were given numbers during live shows, but this was changed in 2010 when they each represented Nigerian states. For the 2013 edition, they represented their respective individuality – each contestant had their name printed on their sash, and only twenty-one of the thirty-six semi-finalists competed in the final. In 2015, the contestants once again represented states.

Prizes for the winner vary each year; as of 2013 this includes ₦3,000,000, a luxury car, the Miss Nigeria diamond-encrusted crown, an apartment for the duration of the winner's reign, and a modeling contract with Beth Model Management. The full scholarship now extends to higher institutions in the country only. Throughout the year, the winner is sponsored by several prestigious organisations, and may land endorsement deals.

== Criticism ==
In a 2006 interview, former pageant manager Yomi Onanuga criticised Miss Nigeria’s lack of long-term substance, intellectual grooming, and sustainability, arguing that two-week boot camps focused mainly on entertainment as opposed to preparing winners, leading to titleholders being unable to handle critical public speaking or intellectual scrutiny shortly after their victory. English Literature student Ibinabo Fiberesima was unable to name the vice-chancellor of the University of Ibadan which she attended during the Miss Nigeria 1991 interview session. Fiberesima has claimed in numerous interviews and on her former website that she had competed in 1997, but this statement is questionable as no contest was held that year; Clara Ojo held the title from 1994 to 1998 when she crowned her successor Regina Nnawunbar. Fiberesima had actually competed in 1991, finishing second behind Bibiana Ohio.

In 1988, dark-skinned trainee caterer Stella Okoye crowned her successor Wunmi Adebowale who was also dark, thus breaking a long line of light-skinned winners, yet Okoye's reign had not been without controversy. Fellow contestant Omasan Buwa told The Punch in 2011 "There was a big uproar and they had to take her out with police escort[s]. The audience felt she was very dark."

The mediocre prizes, along with the lack of endorsements and connections, were a cause for concern before the new millennium. Alice Ad'epe, who won in 1963, told the Idoma Voice "After my reign, that was end of the story. There was no follow up, nobody cared to know how I was faring. Things were no longer rosy. I was abandoned, so I decided to return home." 1993 winner Janet Fateye stated "People thought I was raking in all the money there was, but that wasn't the case. The prize money at the time was a mere N12,000, given to me at N1,000 a month. Yes, I got the car prize that was being serviced by Daily Times, but then I had to buy petrol!" Millennium queen Vien Tetsola reportedly resided in accommodation hardly matching her status as reigning Miss Nigeria.

The Guardian faced criticism in 2011 after its sister publication, Allure, mistakenly described Theatre Arts student and former MBGN runner-up Sandra Otohwo as "Miss Nigeria 2009". Otohwo, who had previously represented Nigeria at Miss Universe, appeared in a series of photographs wearing a bikini, prompting objections from pageant organiser Nike Oshinowo. She argued that the publication had misrepresented the brand, noting that Miss Nigeria had long promoted itself as a swimsuit-free and wholesome competition. She also clarified that the pageant had been dormant between 2004 and 2010, making it impossible for a titleholder to have been crowned in 2009. The Guardian subsequently issued an apology and published Oshinowo's letter in a later edition.

For the first time in the pageant's history, a practising Muslim won the title in 2021, yet hijabi model Shatu Garko's victory was met with opposition from Hisbah, a Muslim purist group in Northern Nigeria. Hisbah criticised Garko's participation in the pageant, claiming it was against Islam, and her action potentially served as an inspiration for other ladies to imitate her actions. In an interview with BBC Hausa, Kano state Hisbah board chairman, Muhammad Harun Ibn-Sina, stated pageantry was against the teaching of Islam, and her parents would be invited to a meeting with the Hisbah board to remind them of their responsibilities and Islamic injunctions.

== Scandals ==
Toyin Monney, a single mother who withheld information regarding her actual age (She was said to be 32), was banned from competing at Miss World, leaving no time to process a visa for Miss Nigeria's second-place winner. Miss Nigeria 1981 Tokunboh Onanuga was accused of forging the WAEC certificate she used to gain admission into the University of Ibadan, and was subsequently expelled by the institution; in 2011, WAEC confirmed on their Twitter account that Onanuga had committed fraud. Binta Sukai's eligibility to compete in 1990 was questioned on nationality grounds. It was later confirmed that the aspiring fashion designer was only one-quarter Scottish.

Despite Sylvia Edem's popularity as Miss Nigeria 2002, students at the University of Lagos—disappointed that their own representative had once again missed out on the title—levelled allegations against Edem, claiming that she had falsified her age, asserting that she was 30 rather than 23, echoing the controversy that had dethroned Ama Valerie Peterside the previous year. The university’s student union—backing Architecture student and their campus queen Kessiana Ezeogene who subsequently placed second in the national pageant—insisted they possessed compelling evidence to support their claims. A thorough investigation concluded that Edem was indeed 23.

Miss Nigeria’s biggest scandal occurred in 2001, when City People reported that the reigning titleholder, thirty-year-old Valerie Peterside, had misrepresented key details in her application. She had allegedly told organisers she was twenty-five and claimed university qualifications she did not possess, having reportedly been expelled from Ahmadu Bello University before graduating due to examination malpractice. Following an investigation by several prominent Nigerians, a decision was made to dethrone her. Peterside, who had competed the previous year (Again as a 25-year-old), fought to keep the crown, but was forced to resign, allowing the first runner-up, Applied Chemistry student Amina Ekpo, to take over.

== Titleholders ==
Year	Title Holder	Region/State of origin*	Notes
1957	Grace Atinuke Oyelude	Northern Region	Now retired from nursing
1958	Helen Anyamaeluna †	Mid-West Region	
1959	Nene Etule	Victoria (Non-Nigerian)	Now Nene Malafa
1960	Rosemary Nkem Anieze also known as "Miss Independence"	Mid-West Region	Now Rosemary Anieze-Adams, worked in TV and radio
1961	Clara Ifeoma Emefiena	Mid-West Region	
1962	Yemi Idowu†	Western Region	Later Yemi Majekodunmi; was semi-finalist at Miss United Nations
1963	Alice Alache Akla Ad'epe	Northern Nigeria	First Idoma winner
1964	Edna Park†	Mid-West Nigeria	First Nigerian at Miss Universe
1965	Anna Eboweime	Mid-West Nigeria	
1967	Rosaline Yinka Balogun	Western State	First undergraduate to win pageant; First official Miss Nigeria at Miss World
1968	Foluke Abosede Ogundipe†	Western State	
1970	Stella Owivri † Also known as "Miss New Nigeria"	Mid-Western State	
1977	Toyin Edna Monney	Lagos	Oldest winner (32)
1978	Irene Omagbemi	Lagos	
1979	Helen Prest	Bendel	Later Helen Prest-Davis and now Helen Prest-Ajayi; lawyer, author and columnist
1980	Syster Esther Jack	Rivers	
1981	Adetokunbo Oluwakemi Onanuga dethroned	Lagos	Dethroned after false WAEC results were discovered
1982	Rita Gbaralate Martins resigned	Rivers	
1984	Cynthia Oronsaye	Bendel	
1985	Rosemary Nkemdilim Okeke	Imo	Last Miss Nigeria at Miss World, now fashion designer
1986	Rita Anuku †	Bendel	
1987	Stella Chinwe Okoye	Imo	
1988	Adewunmi Adebowale	Lagos	Now Wunmi Ogunbiyi; manager with Zenith Bank
1990	Binta Sukai	Kaduna	
1991	Bibiana Ohio-Esezeoboh	Bendel	Former actress, now real estate agent and voice artist
1993	Janet Olukemi Fateye	Lagos	Now Janet Gabriel; IT consultant
1994	Clara Nosakhare Ojo	Edo	Longest-serving Miss Nigeria; now Pastor Clara Kolawole
1998	Regina Nnawunbar	Abia	
2000	Vien Bemigho Tetsola also known as the "Millennium Queen"	Delta	Now known as Israel Shepherd; pastor
2001 a	Valerie Ama Peterside dethroned	Rivers	Dethroned for forging age and qualifications
2001 b	Amina Eyo Ekpo replaced Peterside	Akwa Ibom	Now applied chemist
2002	Sylvia Ansa Edem	Cross River	First South-South winner; now Sylvia Emechete, businesswoman
2003	Nwando Okwuosa	Anambra	Last Miss Nigeria to compete at international level
2004	Ene Maya Lawani	Benue	Now fashion designer specializing in headgear
2010	Oluwadamilola Agbajor	Delta	
2011	Oluwafeyijimi Modupeola Sodipo	Ogun	
2013	Ezinne Akudo Anyaoha	Imo	Now lawyer and activist
2015	Pamela Lessi Peter-Vigboro	Rivers	First Ogoni winner; now professional photographer
2016	Chioma Stephanie Obiadi	Anambra	Previously Miss Earth Nigeria 2016
2017	Mildred Peace Ehiguese	Adamawa	First North-Eastern winner
2018	Chidinma Leilani Aaron	Enugu	
2019	Beauty Etsanyi Tukura	Taraba	First winner from Taraba State
2021	Shatu Sani Garko	Kano	First Muslim winner
2024	Doris Ogah	Edo	

- Denotes Region/state of origin during time of coronation

=== Notable contestants ===
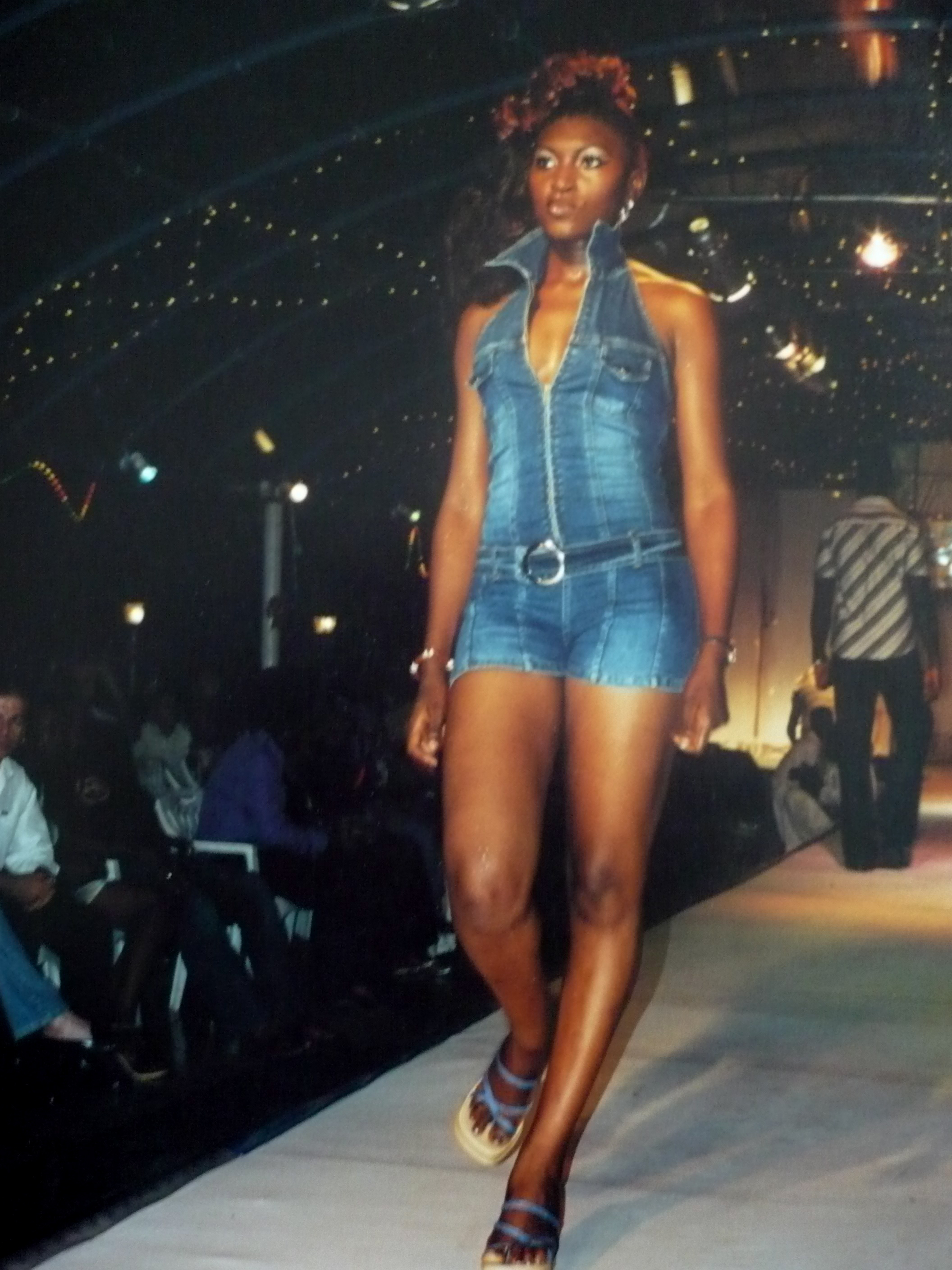
Miss Nigeria 2004 runner-up Ufuoma Ejenobor would later be named Miss Earth Nigeria

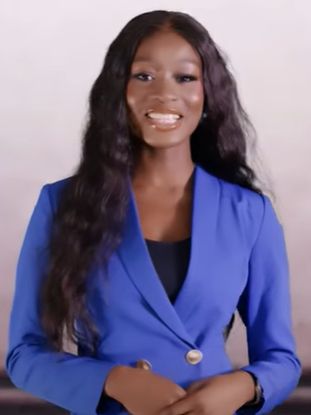
Miss Nigeria 2017 finalist Damilola Bolarinde later won TNQ

- Mbong Odungide (2004) - Most Beautiful Girl in Akwa Ibom 2003 and actress
- Isabella Ayuk (2004) – MBGN 2011
- Damilola Bolarinde (2017) - TNQ 2022
- Omasan Buwa (1987) – MBGN 1987
- Queen Celestine (2013) - Chef and MBGN Universe 2014
- Cynthia Umezulike (2004) – Model, lawyer, and Miss Commonwealth Nigeria 2010
- Chika Chikezie (1998) - MBGN 1998
- Julie Coker (1958) – Newsreader and TV presenter
- Ufuoma Ejenobor (2004) – Actress and Miss Earth Nigeria 2004
- Maryam Elisha (2010 and 2013) – Fashion designer
- Joan Elumelu (1981) – Creator, Nigeria's Next Supermodel
- Ibinabo Fiberesima (1991) - Actress
- Linda Ikeji (2003) - Model and blogger
- Augustina Iruviere (2001) - Actress and MBGN World 1999
- Susan Hart (1993) - Businesswoman and MBGN 1994
- Sylvia Nduka (2010) – Businesswoman and MBGN 2011
- Chikaodili Nna-Udosen (2019) – TNQ 2020
- Queen Nwokoye - Actress
- Eva Ewemade Ogbebor (2003) - Interior designer and Miss Earth Nigeria 2003

Notes:

- † Now deceased

=== Unofficial title holders ===
- Veteran broadcaster Julie Coker is often described as the first Miss Nigeria, but she actually won Miss Western Nigeria.
- In 1963, Miss Nigeria crowned their first ever Idoma winner Alice Ad'epe, yet a different pageant was organised to select a Miss World delegate. 16-year-old Martha Bassey emerged winner despite reservations from the judges who described the contestants as "too ugly", but Miss World organisers disqualified her on age grounds. Eric Morley had confirmed no suitable Nigerian representative had been selected, but first runner-up Gina Onyejiaka became the first ever Nigerian delegate after flying to London at her own expense (Miss World organisers Mecca Dancing refused to pay for her flight to avoid accusations of favouritism). Although Miss World accepted her as a contestant, the Nigerian High Commission refused to acknowledge her as an official representative
- In 1966, after Miss Nigeria failed to send a representative to Miss World (No contest was held in Lagos that year), London-resident Uzor Okafor was disqualified after the deputy Nigerian High Commissioner, Latif Dosumu, refused to sign her registration form as required by the Miss World Organisation, claiming the High Commission did not endorse pageants and were therefore unable to lend official support. Okafor had described her participation as a gesture of goodwill, and argued the High Commission had assured her she could register as an official candidate, but Dosumu denied the claim. Okafor, who had given birth to one of her two daughters seven months prior, was ordered to leave the competition immediately (Married women were allowed to compete in Miss World before the early 70s). Okafor later stated she regretted her involvement with the pageant, and revealed she had been urged to compete by her British husband Bruce Newman.
- No competition was held in 1969 due to the Nigerian Civil War, but Morenike Faridibo was selected as an unofficial Miss Nigeria in a ceremony held in London.
- Shortly after Agbani Darego's victory at Miss World, Miss Nigeria 2001 Amina Ekpo took legal action against her MBGN counterpart, accusing Darego of misrepresentation and fraudulently presenting herself as "Miss Nigeria" at the international pageant without authorisation (At international level, MBGN representatives were billed as "Miss Nigeria"). Former Daily Times managing director Onukaba Adinoyi Ojo, who had famously described MBGN winners as "lowly-rated queens" supported the $10,000,000 lawsuit, stating "We will do everything possible to make sure we prevent people from tampering with a patented pageant like Miss Nigeria, [and] will not allow anybody to misrepresent us."

== Difference between Miss Nigeria and MBGN ==
The Most Beautiful Girl in Nigeria (MBGN) pageant is organised by the Silverbird Group while Miss Nigeria is currently handled by Daily Times (Folio). The Miss Nigeria swimsuit competition was scrapped in 2011, but this feature remains popular at MBGN. Another notable distinction is only MBGN contestants automatically become representatives at international pageants.

== Popular culture ==
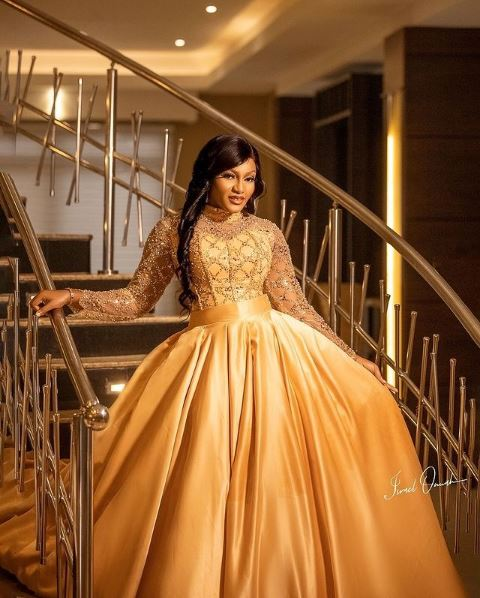
Miss Nigeria 2002 finalist Queen Nwokoye

- The 2004 movie Miss Nigeria features actress Queen Nwokoye - a former real-life contestant - reaching the grand final; her character wins the fictional version. Stephanie Okereke - who reached the MBGN 2002 top three - plays her nemesis who is also a runner-up.
