= Eloho =

Urhobo and Isoko given name

Eloho (often Anglicized as Elohor) is a given name of Urhobo and Isoko origin. It means 'softness', 'ease'. It is unisex, but mainly used for girls. Notable people with this name:

Pronunciation

- Elizabeth Elohor Isiorho (1980), Nigerian modeling agent
- Elohor Eva Alordiah (1989), Nigerian rapper, make-up artist and entrepreneur
- Eloho Efemuai (1973), the founder and CEO of Adelphe Connect
- Elohor Godswill Ekpolo (1995), Nigerian professional footballer
