= Garko =

Garko may refer to:

== People ==
- Gabriel Garko, an Italian actor and former fashion model
- Gianni Garko, an Italian actor
- Ryan Garko, a first baseman for the Texas Rangers of Major League Baseball
- Shatu Garko, a Nigerian model

== Places ==
- Garko, Nigeria, a Local Government Area in Kano State
- Garko, Gombe State, a ward in Gombe State, Nigeria
