= Rufaida Umar Ibrahim =

Nigerian writer (born 1995)

- Born: 16 January 1995 (age 31); Kano State, Nigeria
- Education: Biology and Integrated Science Education.
- Alma mater: Federal College of Education, Kano
- Occupations: Writer; Novelist
- Children: Fatima Alawiyyah, Halimatus Sadiya, Aisha Humaira
- Writing career
- Years active: 2013–present
- Notable awards: 1st Prize Aminiya Trust Short Story Competition Awards; 3rd Place BBC Hausa Women's Writing Competition Awards

Rufaida Umar Ibrahim (born January 16, 1995) is a Nigerian writer and novelist who writes in Hausa. She was born and raised in a half-caste family of Gobirawa and Fulani in Kano, Kano State, Nigeria. She rose to fame after winning the BBC Hausa's women short story writing competition in the year 2020 as the 3rd runner-up alongside Maryam Umar who became the 1st prize winner. Her success for winning another short story competition as 1st runner-up organized by Aminiya Trust Newspaper in the late 2020 made her often regarded as one of the most popular leading female writers of Northern Nigeria.

== Early life and education ==
Rufaida was born in the city of Kano in Nigeria in a half-caste family of Gobir and Fulani. She was raised in the area of Dala local government in Kano State. Her father, Alhaji Ibrahim Umar is a Bagobiri from Gobirawa clan of Hausa of Kano State. While her mother, Hajiya Aishatu Gidado is a Fulani and a native of Diffa in Niger Republic. Rufaida attended Yandutse Primary School for her elementary school education in 2005, which allowed her to complete her secondary education in 2011 at Yandutse College. Then, she went to Federal College of Education, Kano where she's currently a final year student studying Biology and Integrated Science Education.
