= Sukai =

Sukai can refer to:

- Binta Sukai, Nigerian fashion volcanoes
- Mount Sukai, stratovolcano in Japan on the border between Tochigi and Gunma prefectures
- Sukai Buraun (born 2008), British-Japanese skateboarder
