= Julie Coker =

Nigerian television journalist and broadcaster

- Born: Juliet Coker; July 25, 1939 (age 87); Warri, Nigeria
- Occupations: Producer, Television presenter, Newsreader

Julie Coker (born Juliet Coker, July 25, 1939) is a Nigerian television presenter, producer and newsreader, now retired. One of the country's pioneer female broadcasters, Coker was a familiar face during the infancy of Nigerian television, most notably on The Bar Beach Show and her own series Julie's World. As a recording artist, she released three albums during the disco era, and has been sampled by contemporary musicians.

== Early life and education ==
Born in Warri to an Egba/Sierra Leonian father and an Itsekiri mother, Coker was raised in Lagos by her mother who had since remarried an Itsekiri man, and attended the Catholic institution St Mary's Convent Primary School where she developed an interest in music and performance art. She later gained admission into another Catholic school, Holy Child College where the nuns changed her first name to the Catholic-friendly "Juliana". When she was fourteen years old, her mother fell sick and moved to her village to recuperate while Coker stayed with her stepfather's family. After a year without communication from her mother, Coker travelled to Sapele where her great-aunt nearly tricked her into early marriage with an older polygamist, but she escaped with the help of another aunt back to Lagos where she earned a scholarship to continue her education at Holy Child College. In 1957, she represented her school in a festival of arts featured in the Daily Times. Upon completion of her studies, Coker began teaching at Our Lady of Apostles Convent in Warri.

== Pageantry ==
In 1958 during her tenure as a teacher, Coker's friends noticed an advertisement in the Daily Times for second edition of Miss Nigeria. Coker entered the Western Zone of the competition in Ibadan after her photograph was submitted and won (Miss Nigeria consisted of four zones in the early days of the pageant — Kaduna, Enugu, Ibadan, and Lagos). She won the contest as Miss Western Nigeria and proceeded to the grand final in Lagos, but lost to office clerk Helen Anyamaeluna. In 2001, Coker was among the panel investigating the then-Miss Nigeria Valerie Ama Peterside after the latter was accused of forging her university degree.

== Career ==
=== Broadcasting ===
Coker's uncle, Justice Ighodaro, was well-connected with many administrators in the Western region. After his niece expressed an interest in broadcasting, he secured her a job with WNTV. Originally a receptionist at the station, she joined the broadcasting team when she replaced Anike Agbaje-Williams after the latter announced her maternity leave. Coker - now known as Julie - gradually shot to stardom, but unlike Agbaje-Williams who worked mainly behind the camera before her transfer to Ibadan, Coker had long career as a presenter, fronting various programmes including The Bar Beach Show and Julie's World. She was also one of Nigerian television's first female newsreaders.

=== Music ===
Coker has released three albums under E.M.I. Music Nigeria. A compilation record of seven songs was released by Kalita Records in 2019, with four recordings from ‘Ere Yon (Sweet Songs)’ and three from ‘Tomorrow’, including ‘Ere Yon’. The latter was re-interpreted by Anderson .Paak as "Savier's Road" on his album ‘Oxnard’, globally released on Dr. Dre's Aftermath imprint and featuring Coker's original vocals. The compilation also included the lost Afro disco classic ‘Gossiper Scandal Monger’.

=== Other ===
Coker featured in the pre-Nollywood film Dinner with the Devil.
