= Lekan KingKong =

Nigerian content creator and entrepreneur (born 1988)

- Born: Olaleye Olalekan John; February 4, 1988 (age 38); Lagos, Nigeria
- Other name: Agba Inaki
- Education: Ajayi Crowther University
- Occupations: Content creator; Voice-over artist; Entrepreneur
- Years active: 2017–present

Olaleye Olalekan John (born 4 February 1988), known professionally as Lekan KingKong and also as Agba Inaki, is a Nigerian Content Creator, voice-over artist, and entrepreneur based in South Africa. He is known for producing humorous Yoruba-language voice-over commentary on videos shared on social media. Several Nigerian publications have described his style as distinctive for its use of Yoruba-language narration and dialect. He appeared on BBC Yoruba on two occasions, in 2018 and 2019, and was interviewed by The Punch in 2023 in connection with his career and entrepreneurial activities. In 2025, he launched a fashion label, One PAC Global.

== Early life and education ==
Olaleye was born on 4 February 1988 in Lagos, Nigeria, and is a native of Ogun State in southwestern Nigeria. He spent the first sixteen years of his life in Ogbomosho, Oyo State, where members of his family communicated with him primarily in the Yoruba language. He was initially enrolled at the University of Ilorin, where he studied Linguistics, but was expelled in 2007 following a disciplinary matter connected to a social event he attended as a member of a student social club. He subsequently enrolled at Ajayi Crowther University, Oyo State, in 2008, where he studied Business Administration and graduated with a first-class degree in 2012.

== Career ==
=== Content creation ===
Olaleye began producing social media content approximately in 2017 or 2018, initially as a means of promoting music releases connected to a record label he co-founded with a friend. He has stated that his first widely circulated video was recorded on his way to church and posted to his social media page, gaining significant circulation before he returned home. A subsequent video in which he performed as a fictional herbalist commenting on the Nigerian national football team's prospects ahead of a World Cup fixture against Argentina further expanded his audience.His content consists primarily of humorous voice-over commentary recorded in the Yoruba language, delivered in an accent associated with Ogbomosho, applied to pre-existing video footage of people and animals. The Guardian Nigeria described the format as distinct within the Nigerian online comedy space, noting its consistent use of the Yoruba language and its incorporation of idiomatic and dialectal expression.In November 2018, Olaleye appeared on BBC Yoruba, where he discussed his promotion of Yoruba language and culture while living in South Africa. In February 2019, he appeared again on BBC Yoruba during a programme on the forthcoming Nigerian general election, in which he addressed young people on the risks of vote-selling and urged politicians to honour their campaign commitments. In November 2025, he appeared in a further BBC Yoruba interview discussing his support for Arsenal Football Club and his experience living in South Africa.

=== KingKong Productions ===
Olaleye is the chief executive of KingKong Productions and KingKong Records. In 2020, the company produced its first exclusive project, a web series titled Bojuboju, in partnership with Dan Akinlolu, who directed and wrote the script. Olaleye served as executive producer. The series was made available on a subscription streaming platform operated by the company, InakiTV, with plans announced at the time to release it on YouTube as a feature film. Olaleye stated that the company's focus on indigenous-language productions was a deliberate creative and commercial decision connected to his identity as a Yoruba speaker.

=== Other business interests ===
Olaleye has stated that he operates a farm in Nigeria, which is managed by family members, and co-owns a petrol station with his brother. He has described himself as having had established business interests prior to beginning social media content creation. The Sun and Independent reported that his additional commercial interests include the agriculture and oil and gas sectors.

=== One PAC Global ===
In May 2025, Olaleye launched a fashion label, One PAC Global, which he described as a lifestyle brand oriented toward what he characterised as timeless and culturally informed design. The Nation reported that the venture was intended to reflect his Yoruba cultural identity through contemporary fashion, and noted that Olaleye had previously appeared at international events including the Montreux Jazz Festival in connection with the promotion of Yoruba culture.
