= Grace Oyelude =

Nigerian model

Grace Atinuke Oyelude
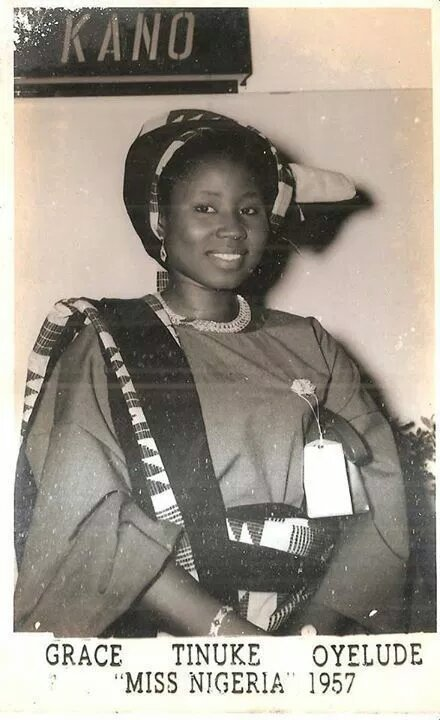
- Born: Grace Atinuke Oyelude; November 16, 1931 (age 94); Kano, Nigeria
- Occupations: Registered nurse, midwife, hospital administrator
- Beauty pageant titleholder
- Title: Miss Nigeria
- Major competition: Miss Nigeria 1957

Grace Atinuke Oyelude (born 16 November 1931) is a retired registered nurse, midwife, and hospital administrator who rose to prominence as the first Miss Nigeria in 1957.

== Early life ==
Oyelude was born on 16 November 1931 in Sabon Gari, Kano, Nigeria. She is the daughter of James Adeleye Oyelude and Martha Jasmine Dantu of Isanlu, Kogi State. Oyelude was raised in Northern Nigeria. She had her primary and secondary education between 1940 and 1952 in Kano, after which she began working with UAC.

== Miss Nigeria ==
In 1957 Oyelude, whilst still with UAC, represented the Northern region at the Miss Nigeria grand final after her brother submitted her photograph to pageant organisers Daily Times, (In the contest's early years, Miss Nigeria was a photo competition). After she was named Miss Nigeria, Oyelude used her £200 cash prize to travel to England and enrol in nursing school.

== Nursing career ==
After her reign, Oyelude disappeared from the limelight to move to the UK and attend nursing school in Kent, where she qualified as a nurse in 1961, subsequently gaining a midwifery qualification in 1962 after training at St. Thomas' Hospital, London. She moved on to the Royal College of Nursing, England, in 1971 and obtained a diploma in nursing and hospital administration (DNHA). At the Ghana Institute of Management and Personnel Administration, she completed studies for another diploma. Oyelude worked with several hospitals, including Paddington General Hospital, one of the former local hospitals of St Mary's Hospital, London.

After returning to Nigeria, Oyelude worked in Kaduna General Hospital between 1964 and 1965. She worked as a senior nursing sister-in-charge of the former Kaduna Nursing Home (now Barau Dikko Specialist Hospital, Kaduna) from 1965 to 1977. When the Nigerian Civil War started in 1967, she moved to Markurdi General Hospital. Oyelude led a team from the Northern region; the group that helped hospitals get ready to treat casualties of war. In the early 1970s she worked as a senior matron and director of nursing services at the Ahmadu Bello University Teaching Hospital after joining the Institute of Health, Ahmadu Bello University. She voluntarily retired from that post in 1985. She was also an external examiner of the Nursing and Midwifery Council of Nigeria. She chaired the Kwara State Health Management Board from 1980 to 1983.

== Personal life ==
Oyelude holds the chieftaincy titles Iyaolu of Isaluland and Iyalode of Okunland, and has many grandchildren. In 2015, the Miss Nigeria Organisation presented her with a Peugeot car.
