= Ebunoluwa Oduwole =

Professor of African Philosophy and Ethics

Vice chancellor of Ajayi Crowther University
- Incumbent
- Assumed office 2025

Personal details
- Born: 10th September
- Party: Non-partisan

Ebunoluwa Olufemi Oduwole is a professor of African Philosophy and Ethics. She was appointed as the Vice-Chancellor of Ajayi Crowther University in 2025. Ebunwole was the first female Vice-Chancellor of the university appointed by the governing council. She had her PhD at the University of Ibadan.

== Educational background ==
She had her bachelor's degree and of at the degree of arts.
