= Adeniyi Drumz =

Nigerian-born drummer (born 1995)

- Born: Adeniyi Adekoya; 22 September 1995 (age 30); Ibadan, Nigeria
- Genres: contemporary gospel, worship
- Occupations: Drummer; composer
- Instrument: Drums

Adeniyi Adekoya (born September 22, 1995), professionally known as Adeniyi Drumz, is a Nigerian-born drummer and composer based in the United Kingdom. He is known for his rhythm-focused community workshops, musical performances, and cross-cultural youth engagement projects in Nigeria and in South Yorkshire.

He is a recipient of Best Drummer of the Year at the Eko Heritage Awards and he is the convener of Drums Dialogue & Rhythm Exchange, an annual community drumming concert held in Sheffield, UK

== Early life and education ==
Adeniyi was born and raised in Molete, Ibadan, Nigeria, and hails from Ijebu Ode in Ogun State. He began drumming as a child using makeshift instruments made from household items such as kegs and metal plates. His passion developed through church performances and local community involvement during his teenage years.

He holds a bachelor's degree in economics from Ajayi Crowther University (2018) and a master's degree in Financial Technology from the University of Bradford (2023).

== Career ==
Adeniyi Drumz first gained widespread attention in Nigeria through his performances at major events, including a presidential dinner at Aso Villa. He has mentored several emerging drummers, including his younger brother, who became a finalist on Nigeria's Got Talent.

In the UK, Adekoya is known for curating rhythm-based cultural projects such as the Drums, Dialogue & Rhythm Exchange, an annual community drumming event launched in Sheffield. He has also hosted interactive workshops for youth, with a focus on empowerment, identity, and healing through rhythm.

He collaborated with saxophonist Adedoyin Oseni on the track Jelenke Iife in 2024. Music critic Michael Kolawole described his drumming pattern on the tune as calm and joyful.

=== Community projects ===
Adeniyi believes that music particularly can be a tool for personal growth, healing, and social connection. In 2025, he initiated a youth-focused project titled Unshaken: The Power of Faith & Drums, and is currently collaborating with the Sheffield-based charity FURD (Football Unites, Racism Divides) to deliver Sound for Healing workshops for youth asylum seekers and other vulnerable groups.

== Awards and recognition ==
Award	Year	Category	Result	Ref.
Eko Heritage Awards	2024	Best Drummer of the Year	Won	

== Personal life ==
Adeniyi married Favour Adekoya in 2022 and currently resides in South Yorkshire, United Kingdom.
