= Babatunde Jose =

Nigerian journalist (1925–2008)

Alhaji Babatunde Jose OFR
- Born: Ismail Babatunde Jose; 13 December 1925; Lagos, British Nigeria
- Died: 2 August 2008 (aged 82)
- Occupations: Journalist and newspaper editor

Alhaji Ismail Babatunde Jose OFR (13 December 1925 – 2 August 2008) was a Nigerian journalist and newspaper editor. He was described by UK newspaper The Guardian as the "legendary doyen of Nigerian journalism" and as "one of Nigeria's most significant media figures"; by The Independent as the "newspaper editor who dominated journalism in Nigeria for three decades" and as "the mighty tree whose seedlings sprouted other titans of the profession"; and by the British Broadcasting Corporation as "the grandfather of Nigerian journalism".

== Early life and education ==
Jose was born on 13 December 1925 in Lagos, Nigeria, to the family of Hamzat and Hajarat Jose; his father was a trader, originally from Ikare in Ondo State, who had moved to Lagos, and his mother was of Nupe ancestry. His paternal grandfather was Braimoh Jose, once the Seriki Musulmi of Calabar. Babatunde Jose received his education at Lagos Government School, Yaba, Lagos, Methodist school, Yaba and St Saviour's College.

== Journalism career ==
Jose started his career at Nnamdi Azikiwe's Daily Comet, before becoming a trainee at the Daily Times in 1941, at the age of 16. He was transferred to editorial department as a junior reporter in 1946 and then worked as a Times correspondent in the Eastern region and Northern region. In 1947, the Daily Mirror group bought majority shares in the Daily Times. From 1948 to 1950, Jose was political and industrial correspondent of the Times and in 1950, he became the news editor.

He worked for several papers (including the Daily Mirror in Fleet Street in London for a year in 1951), then returned to the Daily Times, where he was made the assistant editor in 1952. On 13 December 1957, he was appointed the editor before becoming a board member in September 1958. Nigeria became independent in 1960, and Jose benefited from a policy of Africanisation: he "was appointed the company's first African managing director in 1962, becoming chairman as well in 1968". Over the following years, the Daily Times became Nigeria's best-selling newspaper. In 1965, Jose was awarded the title Officer of the Federal Republic.

"Keen on educated journalists," Jose "went out of his way to set up a training school and to employ graduates". According to The Independent, he shaped his trainees and graduates "into irreverent reporters and columnists who could deflate the egos of the pompous politicians and military men who ruled the country", though he "eschewed partisan politics". One of his trainees, Segun Osoba, later Governor of Ogun State, said of him that he "encouraged intellectualism in Nigerian journalism" and "produced an array of highly successful journalists [...] many of whom have also gone on to establish their own newspapers and produce many other journalists".

Following a coup in 1975 by General Murtala Mohammed, the Daily Times was forced to sell 60% of its shares to the government, and Jose was "eased out", departing a year later. The newspaper subsequently declined.

From 1976 onwards, he pursued a career as "a businessman and media guru, holding such positions as chairman of the Nigerian Television Authority". He also served as "president of the Ahmadiyya Islamic movement and on many committees and industry organizations".

Though he never graduated from a university, he was awarded an honorary doctorate of law by the University of Benin. "Unusually for a Muslim, he [also] received the Pope Pius medal for fostering religious understanding."

In 1987, he published his autobiography, Walking a Tight Rope.
