= Fidelis Anosike =

Nigerian media entrepreneur and business magnate (Born 1969)

- Born: 1969
- Citizenship: Nigerian
- Education: University of Benin (BA); Harvard University (OPM)
- Occupations: Media entrepreneur; Business magnate
- Title: Publisher of Daily Times of Nigeria (2004–present); Chair of Folio Communications (1991–2020); Owner of Miss Nigeria (2004–present)
- Spouse: Rita Dominic (m. 2022)
- Website: fidelisanosike.com

Fidelis Anosike is a Nigerian media entrepreneur and business magnate. He is the founder of Folio Media Group, which owns Daily Times of Nigeria as well as the Miss Nigeria pageant and the former CNN-created platform Folio Nigeria. He is a shareholder in Nigeria Air.

== Career ==
Anosike obtained a Creative and Applied Fine Arts degree from the University of Benin and graduated from the OPM Program at Harvard Business School. He was 24 years old when he founded Folio Communications and 35 years old when he purchased Daily Times in 2004. The newspaper's archive included a reported 660,000 photographs, videos, and publication items stretching back to almost a century.

In 2020, he stepped down as chairman and CEO of Folio Communications.

== Personal life ==
In 2022, Anosike married Nollywood actress Rita Dominic. He handed her administration of the Miss Nigeria pageant.
