= Ahmed Mohamed Kismayo =

Somali journalist (1964–2017)

Ahmed Mohamed Ali Kismayo
- Axmed Maxamed Cali Kismaayo
- Born: 1964; Kismayo, Somalia
- Died: 9 August 2017 (aged 52–53); Hyderabad, India
- Citizenship: Somalia
- Education: Somali National University
- Occupation: Journalist
- Years active: 1987—2017

Ahmed Mohamed Ali 'Kismayo' (Somali: Axmed Mohamed Cali Kismaayo; 1964–2017, Arabic: أحمد محمد علي كيسمايو) was a Somali journalist who worked for the BBC Somali Service between 1997 and 2012. Later he was the first director of the Puntland TV and Radio which was established in 2013, and held that position since 2014. He was succeeded by Abdul Fatah Nur Ashkir, Kismayo died in Hyderabad, India, in 2017.

== Personal life and education ==
Ahmed Mohamed Ali 'Kismayo' was born in Kismayo, the capital city of Lower Jubba, in 1964. He completed his primary and secondary education in Mogadishu.

Kismayo was earned a bachelor's degree in journalism from the Somali National University in 1990. Fluent in Arabic, Somali, and English, Kismayo was married to three wives and fathered eleven children. He hailed from the Isse Mohamoud sub-clan of Majeerteen.

== Career ==
Previous earning a diploma of journalism, Kismayo commenced his career at Radio Mogadishu in 1987. His tenure there persisted until the collapse of Somali Democratic Republic government and the onset of the Somali Civil War in 1991. Displaced with his family, he first relocated to Kismayo and later to Mombasa, Kenya, where he resided for four years. Returning to Somalia, he played a pivotal role in founding Riyaaq magazine in 1998, collaborating with academics like Said Hussein Iid and serving as his editor.

Ahmed Kismayo transitioned to the BBC Somali Service, dedicating his efforts until 2012. Subsequently, in 2013, he played a crucial role in the establishment of the Puntland TV and Radio in the Government of Puntland. Assuming the role of director, he held the position until 2014. In 2017, he took on the responsibility of heading of the Puntland Electoral Commission and he resigned in the same year due to health issues.

Beyond his journalistic pursuits, Ahmed Kismayo's multifaceted career includes a stint as a Alwaha Secondary School teacher in Garowe from 1995 to 1997, where he also imparted Sharia sciences in the city's mosques.

== Published works ==
- (Somali: Hoygii Samatabixinta)
- (Somali: Layliga Suxufiga)

== Death ==
Ahmed Mohamed Kismayo died on 9 August 2017, following a battle with illness in Hyderabad, India, where he was undergoing medical treatment. The former President of the Puntland, Abdiweli Gaas, conveyed his condolences through a formal letter mourning the loss of the esteemed journalist.
