= Hassan Gallaydh =

Somali journalist

- Xasan Gallaydh
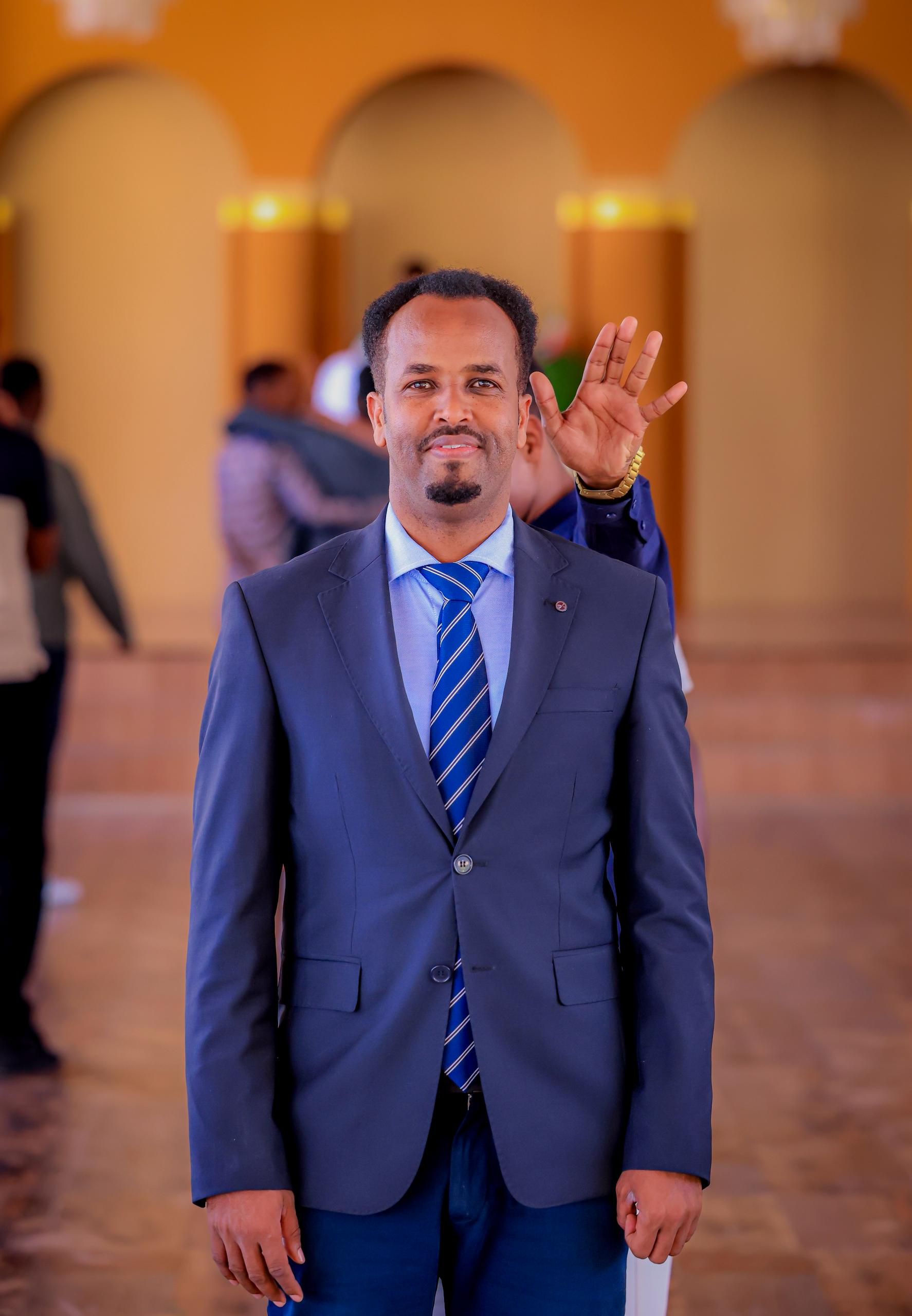
- Born: Hassan Sulaiman Harun Gallaydh
- Occupation: Journalist
- Years active: 2015—present
- Employers: Horn Cable TV; BBC Somali; Galaydh Media
- Website: gallaydh.com

Hassan Gallaydh (Somali: Xasan Gallaydh) is a Somali journalist from Somaliland. He has worked with Horn Cable TV, BBC Somali, and founder of Gallaydh Media, a digital news platform.

== Biography ==
Gallaydh was born as Hassan Sulaiman Harun Gallaydh.

=== Journalism career ===
Gallaydh worked at Horn Cable TV (HCTV), where he served in roles including reporter and later Head of News. He has also worked as a freelance journalist for BBC Somali. BBC coverage has referenced him in connection with reporting on political and security developments in Somaliland. Gallaydh has also founded Galaydh Media, also known as Galaydh TV, a Somali digital media platform founded that publishes news and current affairs content.

=== Arrest and press freedom issues ===
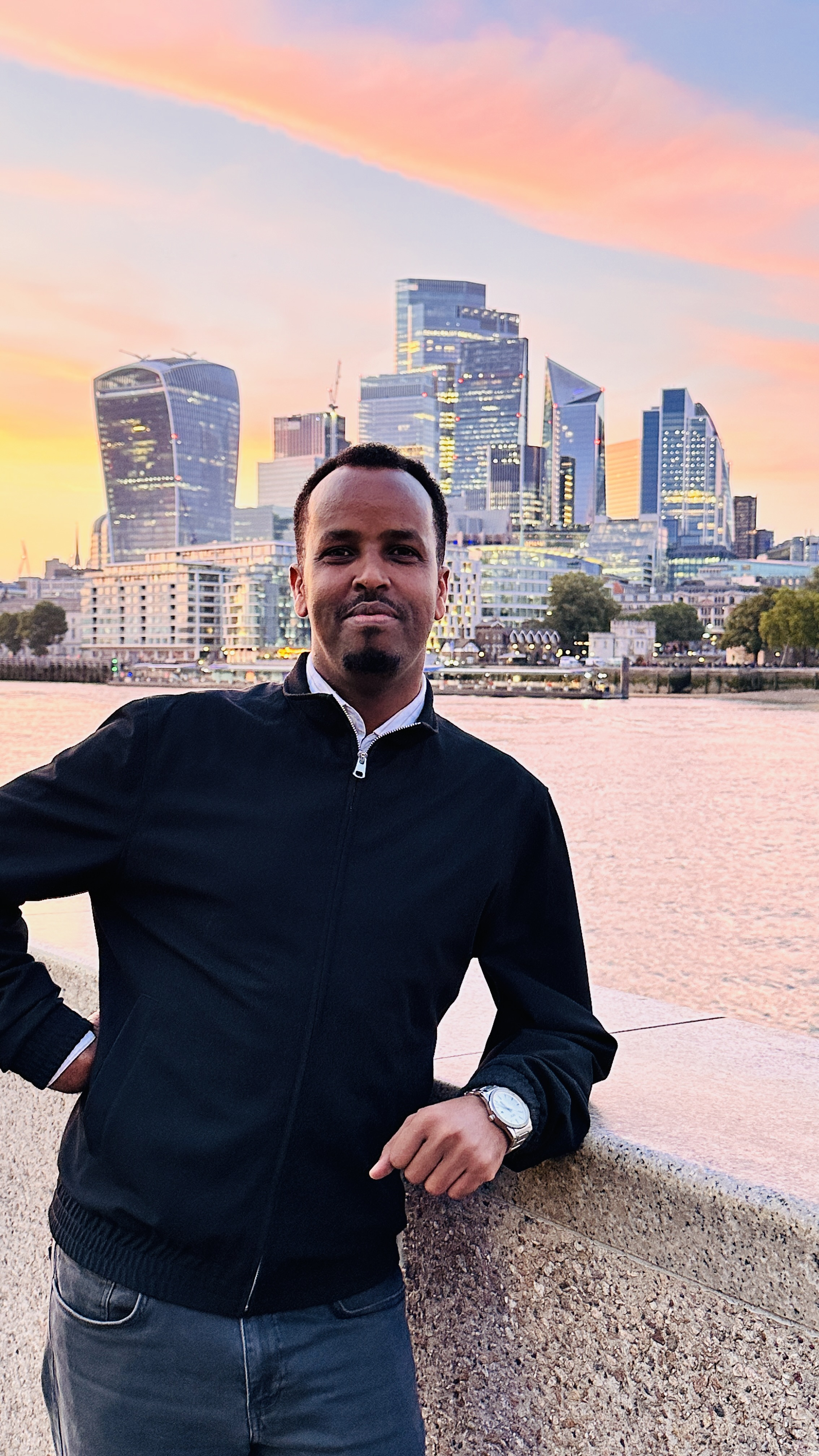

In April 2022, Gallaydh was arrested in Hargeisa, with several other journalists, while covering unrest at Hargeisa Prison. The Committee to Protect Journalists called for the unconditional release of the detained journalists and expressed concern about press freedom conditions in Somaliland. News services also reported that the journalists were not immediately brought before a court following their detention. The arrests were widely covered by regional and international media outlets and were cited by press freedom organizations as part of broader concerns regarding the treatment of journalists in Somaliland.
