= Doris Ogah =

Nigerian model

- Born: Doris Esiokhayamhe Ogah; 1998 (age 27–28); Edo, Nigeria
- Occupations: Model, Miss Nigeria, Lawyer

Doris Ogah (born 1998) is a Nigerian fashion model and beauty pageant titleholder who was crowned Miss Nigeria in 2024.

== Career ==
Before her modeling career, Ogah worked as a lawyer and entrepreneur.

In December 2024, Ogah was crowned Miss Nigeria. She was congratulated shortly after by governor of Edo State Monday Okpebholo.

Since winning Miss Nigeria, Ogah has promised to advocate for quality education and access to opportunities.

== Personal life ==
Ogah practices yoga every morning. She drives a Changan Eado Generation III which she was gifted after winning the Miss Nigeria competition.
