= Gina Onyejiaka =

Nigerian beauty model

Therese Gina Onyejiaka was a Nigerian model and the first Nigerian woman to represent her country at Miss World 1963.

== Early life ==
Gina Onyejiaka was born in Owerri, Imo State in the mid-1940s. She was the second of six children.

== Pageantry ==
Onyejiaka was drawn to the world of fashion and pageantry from an early age, despite the limited for Nigerian women to participate in these fields at the time. In 1963 she competed in Miss World Nigeria, a pageant organised to select the country's first ever representative at Miss World (The Miss Nigeria Organisation were yet to acquire the international pageant's franchise), and emerged first runner-up behind 16-year-old Martha Bassey. However, despite her victory, Bassey was disqualified on age grounds, leaving an opportunity for Onyejiaka.

Onyejiaka faced harsh criticism from Miss World Nigeria organisers who deemed her unsuitable to represent the country, branding her as 'ugly'. Although Miss World organisers Mecca Dancing had accepted Onyejiaka as Bassey's replacement, Miss World Nigeria refused to send her abroad. After Mecca Dancing declined to pay for her flight to avoid favouritism accusations, Onyejiaka independently funded her Miss World participation in London, becoming the first Nigerian woman to compete at the pageant.

== Legacy ==
Onyejiaka's story continues to inspire generations of Nigerians, particularly women, to challenge societal norms and pursue their dreams. Her courage and determination have left an enduring legacy in the annals of Nigerian history. Onyejiaka's determination and resilience in overcoming adversity have made her a symbol of women's empowerment and a pioneer in Nigerian beauty pageantry. Her participation in the Miss World pageant opened doors for subsequent Nigerian representatives and helped elevate the country's profile on the global stage.
