= Innocent Umezulike =

Nigerian jurist

Innocent Umezulike OFR
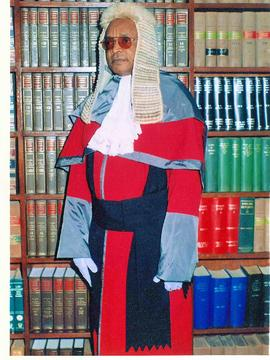
- Born: Innocent Azubike Umezulike; 21 September 1953; Rivers State, Nigeria
- Died: 11 June 2018 (aged 64); London, England
- Burial place: Mgbidi, Enugu State
- Occupation: Jurist
- Years active: 1972–2018
- Children: Cynthia Umezulike

Innocent Azubike Umezulike OFR (21 September 1953 – 11 June 2018) was a Nigerian jurist who served as the chief judge of Enugu State for over 13 years. He remains the longest-serving chief judge in South-Eastern Nigeria, and second longest-serving chief judge in Nigeria.

== Education ==
Innocent Azubike Umezulike was born on 21 September 1953 in Rivers State, southern Nigeria and a native Ifite Mgbidi in Enugu State. He went to St. Vincent Secondary School, where he obtained his West African School Certificate in 1971. He then attended the University of Lagos, graduating with a bachelor's degree in law in 1976.

== Career ==
He joined the Nigerian Television Authority as an assistant legal adviser to the corporation. He was admitted to the Nigerian Bar Association in 1980.

In 1983, Umezulike joined the University of Ibadan's faculty of law before joining Nnamdi Azikiwe University, where he began as a senior lecturer in 1987 and became an associate professor in 1992. In August 1993, he was appointed Judge of Enugu State, prior to which he became the state's Chief Judge; after four years of service, he was nominated to serve in the Supreme Court of the Gambia. He was also appointed chairman of the Failed Banks Tribunal Zone 6 Nigeria.

Throughout his career, Umezulike served in various positions at public and private institutions, including as a senior special adviser to the Attorney General of Nigeria prior to his appointment as an Enugu State judge. He also authored and published over 23 books on conveyancing, adverse possession, and land and property law throughout his career.

Umezulike died at a hospital in London on 11 June 2018. The Hon. Justice Innocent Umezulike Foundation, set up after his death, held a memorial lecture at the Justice I.A Umezulike Auditorium, Enugu State High Court complex in September 2019, marking the first anniversary of his death with a presentation of the book Hon. Justice Innocent Umezulike: A Chronicle of Leading Judgements Volume 1.

== Honours ==
- Order of the Federal Republic of Nigeria
