= Ebunoluwa Olufemi Oduwole =

Vice-chancellor Ajayi Crowther University

- Born: September 10, 1962 (age 63); Ibadan, Nigeria
- Citizenship: Nigerian
- Education: University of Ibadan, Ibadan; Katholieke University; Radboud University; University of Padova
- Occupations: Academic; engineer
- Office: Vice Chancellor of Ajayi Crowther University
- Predecessor: Professor Timothy Adebayo

Professor Ebunoluwa Olufemi Oduwole is a Nigerian Professor of African Philosophy and Ethics in the Department of Philosophy, Olabisi Onabanjo University, Ago-Iwoye, Ogun State, Nigeria and currently serving as the first female Vice-chancellor of Ajayi Crowther University.

== Early life and education ==
Ebunoluwa studied Philosophy and holds a Doctor of Philosophy (PhD), Master of Arts (M.A.), and Bachelor degree of art (B.A) all from the University of Ibadan, Ibadan, Nigeria. She received her Master of Science in Bioethics from an Italy consortium of Universities during 2011/2012 academic session which includes Katholieke University, Belgium, Radboud University, Nijmegen, Netherlands and University of Padova.

== Career ==
Ebunoluwa has previously served as a lecturer and as an administrator at Olabisi Onabanjo University in various capacities prior to her recent appointment at Ajayi Crowther University as the first female Vice-chancellor on Tuesday 8th July 2025. She previously held various leadership positions at Olabisi Onabanjo University Ago-Iwoye, Ogun State, including Head of the Department of Philosophy, Dean of faculty, Director of General and Entrepreneurial Studies, and Deputy Vice-Chancellor (Administration).
