= Shatu Garko =

44th Miss Nigeria

Shatu Sani Garko (born 23 November 2003) is a Nigerian model and beauty queen who was crowned the 44th Miss Nigeria in 2021. Winning at the age of 18, she is notable for being the first Muslim to win the pageant.

== Background ==
Garko is an indigene of Kano State, Nigeria. Although raised a Muslim, she attended a Catholic secondary school where she faced bullying. As a model, Garko was advised to ditch her hijab to succeed in the industry, which she refused.

== Miss Nigeria ==
In 2021, Garko became the first Muslim to win Miss Nigeria in the pageant's 64-year history, and the first hijabi contestant alongside pharmacist Halima Abubakar.

== Criticism ==
Garko's Miss Nigeria victory was met with opposition from Hisbah, a Muslim purist group in Northern Nigeria. Hisbah criticised Garko's participation in the pageant, describing her actions as "illegal" and a bad example to young Muslim girls. In an interview with BBC Hausa, the Kano state Hisbah board chairman, Muhammad Harun Ibn-Sina, confirmed Garko's parents had been invited to a meeting with the Hisbah board for questioning.
