= Cynthia Umezulike =

Nigerian lawyer

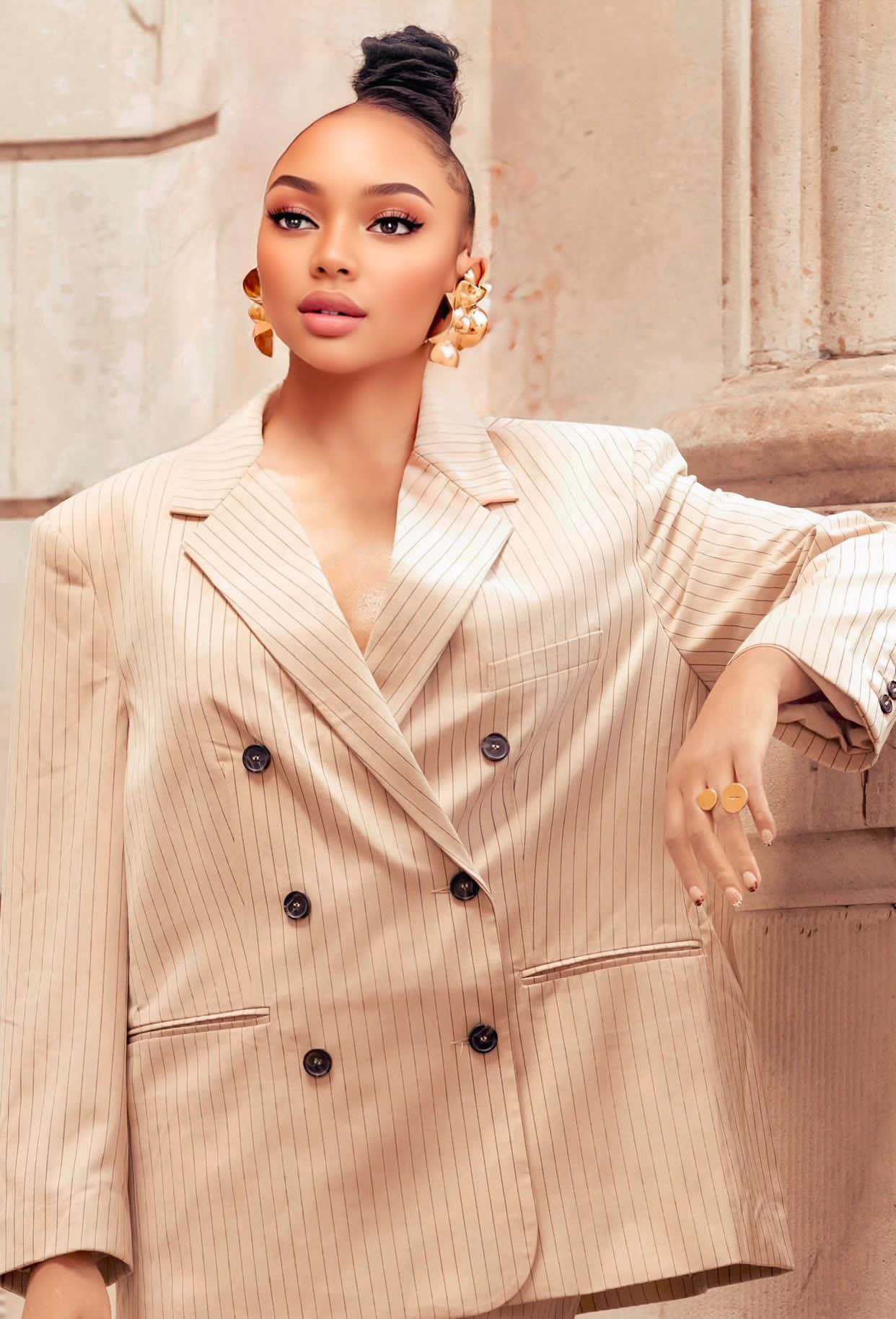
- Born: Cynthia Chisom Umezulike
- Education: Igbinedion University; Queen Mary University of London; University of East London; Birkbeck, University of London
- Occupation: Lawyer, Activist, Professor
- Family: Father; Innocent Umezulike

Cynthia Chisom Umezulike is a British Nigerian human rights lawyer, legal scholar, policy practitioner, author and climate sustainability activist. She is recognised for her work on human rights-based development, gender justice, climate resilience, and inclusive economic systems, with a particular focus on rural women, informal economies, and climate-affected communities in Africa and the Global South

Umezulike is the president at the Global Human Rights Centre (GHRC) London, and founding Director of the Centre for Sustainable Development, Energy Transitions and Climate Change at the University of Bedfordshire, United Kingdom.

She is also the Chair and Director of the International Conference on Human Rights, Sustainability and Climate Change, an interdisciplinary global forum advancing rights-centred approaches to climate and development challenges. She has made formal written and oral contributions to United Nations human rights mechanisms and forums, including submissions to the Human Rights Council, Special Rapporteurs, and expert working groups on climate justice, business and human rights, racial equality, mental health, and sustainable development. and also Co-Chair of the Hon. Justice Innocent Umezulike Foundation.

== Early life and education ==
Umezulike was born to jurist father who served as the chief judge of Enugu State Innocent Umezulike from Mgbidi in Enugu State. She attended Our Lord's Shepherd International School (OLSIS) in Enugu and later joined Igbinedion University in Edo State, graduating with a Bachelor of Laws (LL.B.) degree. She attended the Nigerian Law School and became a Barrister and Solicitor at Law (BL) Federal Republic of Nigeria Law (BL).

She thereafter got a Master of Laws (LL.M.) degree in international human rights law from the Queen Mary University of London and later obtained a second master's degree LL.M. degree in international law and criminal justice from University of East London. She went on to attend Birkbeck, University of London, graduating with a Doctor of Philosophy (Ph.D) degree in law.

== Career ==
After completing her studies, She began working as the head of legal and business governance at Diamond Hanger Aviation London and an associate lecturer in constitutional and administrative law at Birkbeck, University of London, and international human rights lecturer at the University of Buckingham, Chair of the International Conference on Human Rights, Sustainability and Climate Change at University of Buckingham. She also became the director of human rights and advocacy and worked as a third sector Head of Racial Equality, Diversity, and Inclusion, helping organizations in developing and implementing cultural interventions to drive systemic and cultural change.

In 2019, Umezulike set up The Hon. Justice Innocent Umezulike Foundation, during a memorial lecture marking the first anniversary of her father's death with a presentation of the book Hon. Justice Innocent Umezulike: A Chronicle of Leading Judgements Volume 1 and later became a co-chair and trustee of the foundation, which is named after her father.

She was recommended by the United Nations Consultative Group to the president of the Human Rights Council in 2024 as the final two nominee for the human rights independent expert mandate Working Group of Experts on People of African Descent and as a member of the Working Group of Experts on the Rights of Peasants and Other People Working in Rural Areas. She is an associate professor and Director for The Centre for Sustainable Development, Energy transition and Climate change.

== Activism for human rights and climate sustainability ==
Umezulike is known for her work in human rights, climate advocacy, gender justice, and participation in public forums addressing racism which also include the Black Lives Matter. Her legal and academic contributions focus on socio-economic rights, women's empowerment, and climate justice, particularly in vulnerable communities. In a 2024 opinion piece published in The Guardian, she advocated for generational change in Nigerian politics, calling for greater inclusion of youth in governance. She has also participated in international discussions on environmental and social governance, where she highlighted the importance of values-based communication to foster public trust in climate-related initiatives and at COP29, where she called for the integration of human rights principles into climate policy, with an emphasis on gender-responsive approaches for rural communities affected by climate change.

Since 2024, Umezulike serves as Vice Chair of the UK Human Rights Lawyers Association, making her one of the youngest Black women to hold a senior executive position in the organization’s history and was named among the Most Influential People of African Descent (MIPAD) under 40 for her contributions to law, policy, and sustainable development.

In 2025, she coordinated climate sustainability awareness campaigns at several UK universities, including the University of Bedfordshire, combining legal education with environmental outreach and her gender rights activism draws from personal experiences, including surviving child violence and abuse. She has also promoted legal and institutional reforms to support rural women’s economic rights in Nigeria and written on structural patriarchy and cultural norms, encouraging discourse on the internalization of gender inequality in African societies.

== Writing ==
=== United Nations Interventions and Thematic Contributions ===
Umezulike has made multiple formal written and oral contributions to United Nations mechanisms, influencing global discourse on human rights and sustainable governance.

She provided written input to the United Nations Human Rights Council for the thematic report The Ocean and Human Rights, prepared by the Special Rapporteur on the human right to a clean, healthy and sustainable environment, Astrid Puentes Riaño (A/HRC/58/59)

She also contributed to the United Nations call for inputs on Human Rights in the Life Cycle of Renewable Energy and Critical Minerals, issued by the Special Rapporteur on Climate Change, addressing the socio-environmental risks associated with mineral extraction, green transition supply chains, and labour exploitation.

Umezulike provided expert input to the United Nations Working Group of Experts on People of African Descent (WGEPAD) for the thematic report Fulfilling the Economic, Social and Cultural Rights of People of African Descent in the Age of Digitalisation, Artificial Intelligence and Emerging Technologies (A/HRC/57/70)

In the field of mental health and autonomy, Umezulike provided a written statement entitled “Autonomy, Dignity, and Mental Health: Challenging Involuntary Treatment through a Human Rights Lens” at the United Nations Consultation on Mental Health and Human Rights organised by the Office of the High Commissioner for Human Rights (OHCHR) at the Palais des Nations, Geneva. This intervention critiqued coercive psychiatric practices and advocated for rights-based, consent-driven mental health care models.

=== Opinion Journalism and Public Commentary ===
Umezulike is also recognised for her incisive socio-political commentary, particularly on Nigerian governance, civic consciousness, and democratic accountability. Her opinion pieces have been published in leading media platforms including The Guardian, Vanguard, and Premium Times.

Notable publications include:

- Invading Nigeria Is Not a Punchline and History Shows Guns A-Blazing Fixes Nothing – a critical response to militaristic rhetoric and external intervention discourse in Nigerian political commentary.
- Nigeria’s Real Crisis Is Not Leadership But the Psychology of the Led – an analysis of civic accountability, political culture, and structural political disengagement.
- Why Nigeria Must Retire Its Political Geriarchy – advocating generational political reform and democratic renewal.

=== Academic Editorial Work ===
Umezulike is a former editor of the Lord Denning Law Journal and serves as an Editor for the Journal of Sustainability and Clean Energy, contributing to the direction and scholarly rigor of special issues focused on sustainable development, energy transition, and climate governance. Her editorial work supports interdisciplinary scholarship bridging environmental science, policy, and human rights-based development.

In 2024, she authored a short story titled, The Death of Mother: An Ogbanje Story.

== Recognition and awards ==
In 2022, she received the Distinguished Emerging Scholar Award from Marymount Manhattan College, New York and the Global Engagement award from the University of East London in 2024. In 2010, she won Miss Commonwealth International Nigeria and represented Nigeria at Miss Commonwealth International
