= Garko, Gombe State =

Garko
- ward
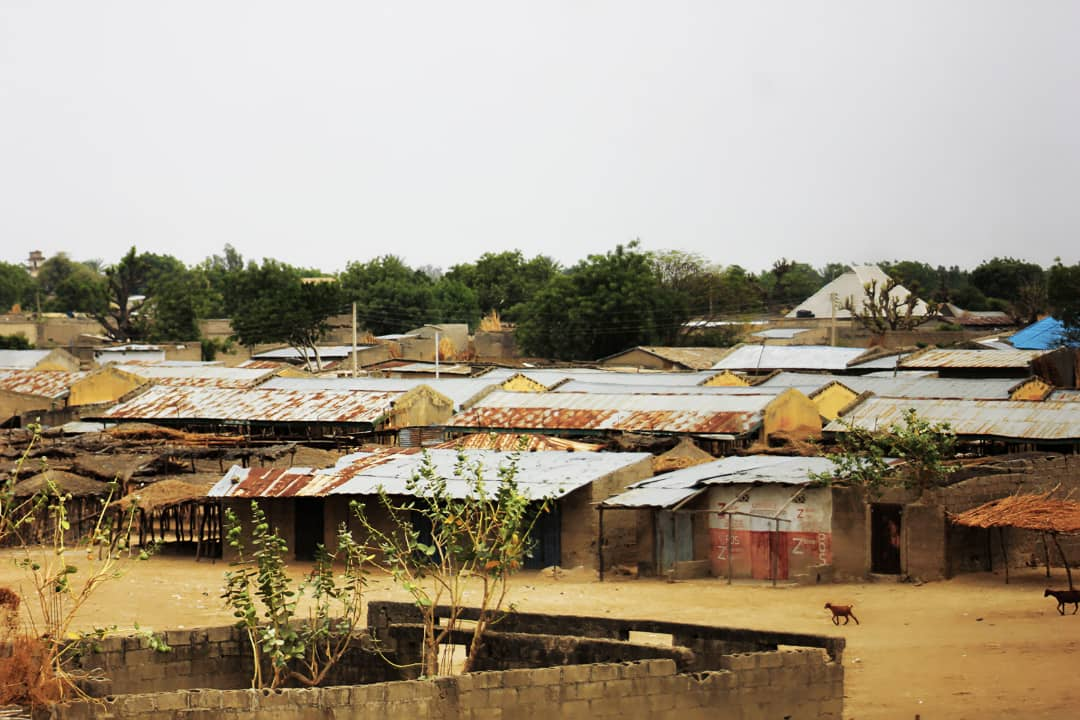
- Garko town Community

- Location in Nigeria
- Coordinates: 10°10′30″N 11°9′52″E
- Country: Nigeria
- State: Gombe State
- LGA: Akko

Government
  - Type: Democratic

Area
  - Total: 112.8 km^{2} (43.6 sq mi)

Population (21,141 in 2006 census)
  - Ethnicities: Fulani Tangale
  - Religions: mostly populated are Muslims and some few Christians
- Time zone: UTC1 (WAT)

Garko is a ward located in Gombe State, Nigeria's Akko Local Government Area. About 12.7 kilometres or 7.9 miles, from Garko. The distance is roughly 421 kilometers / 262 mi from Garko to Abuja, the capital of Nigeria.

The Postcode of the area is 771104.

== Gallery ==
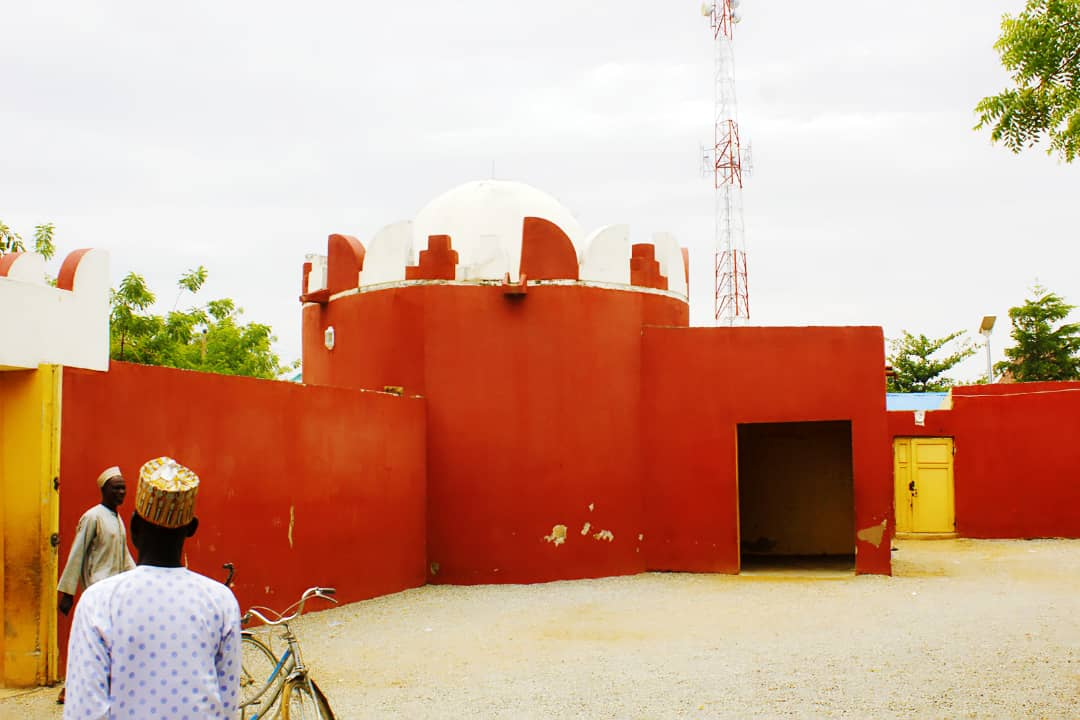
Garko palace, Akko LGA Gombe State.

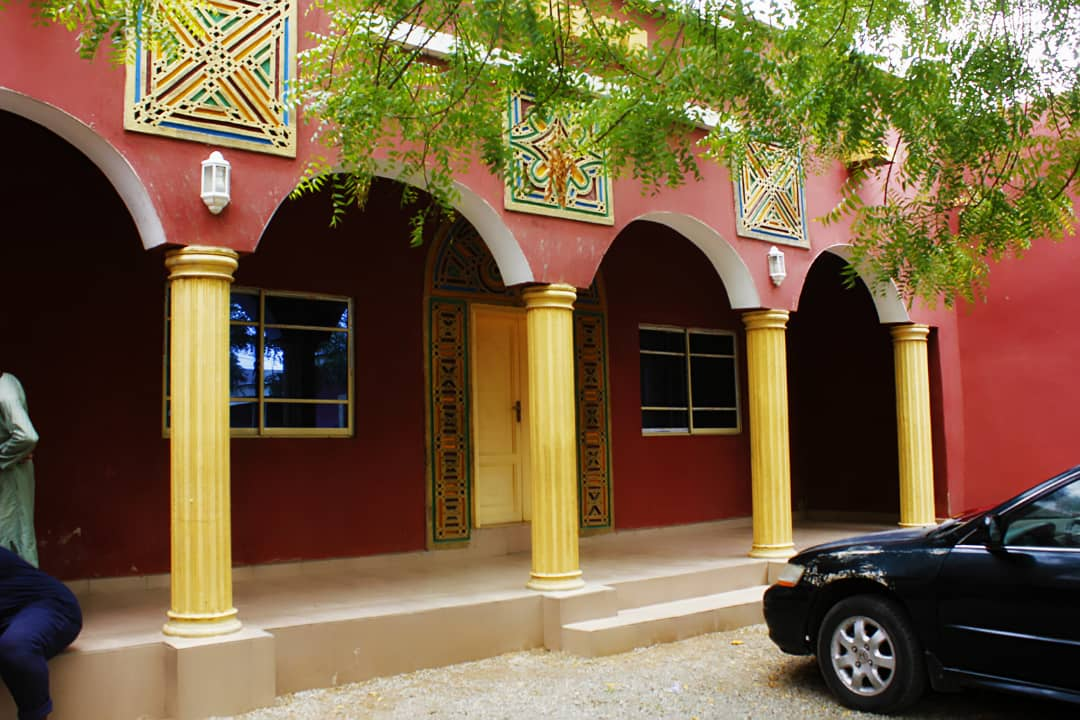
Garko Palace area.

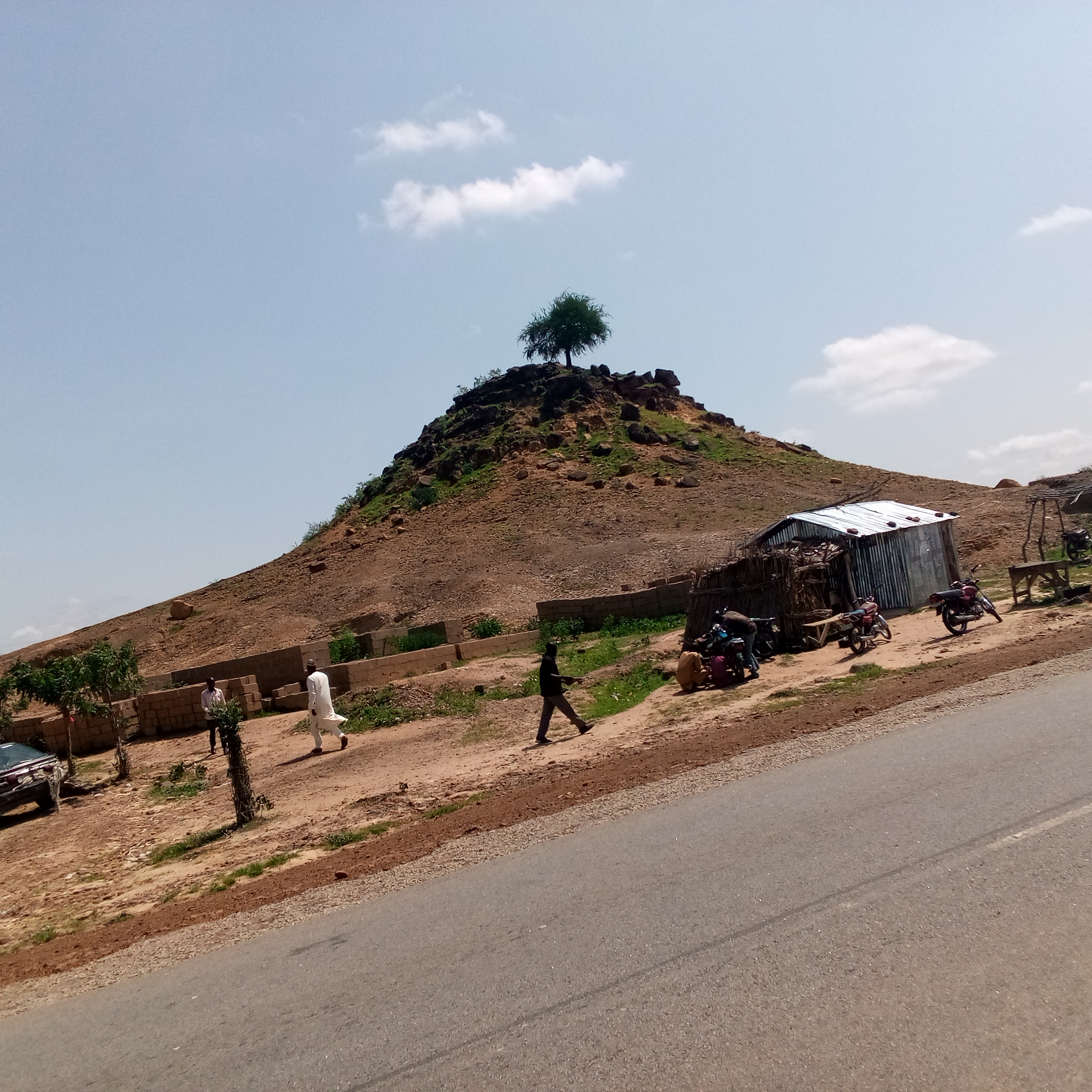
Wani duste a garin Garko, Akko LGA, Gombe State.

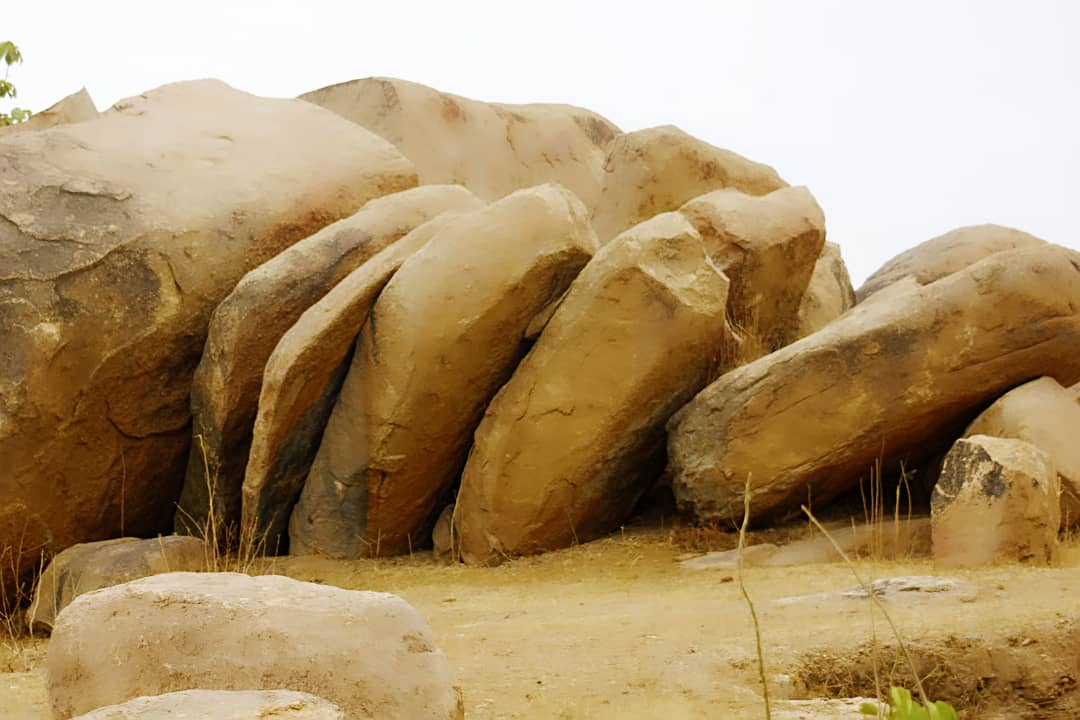
Eloquent rock in Garko town.

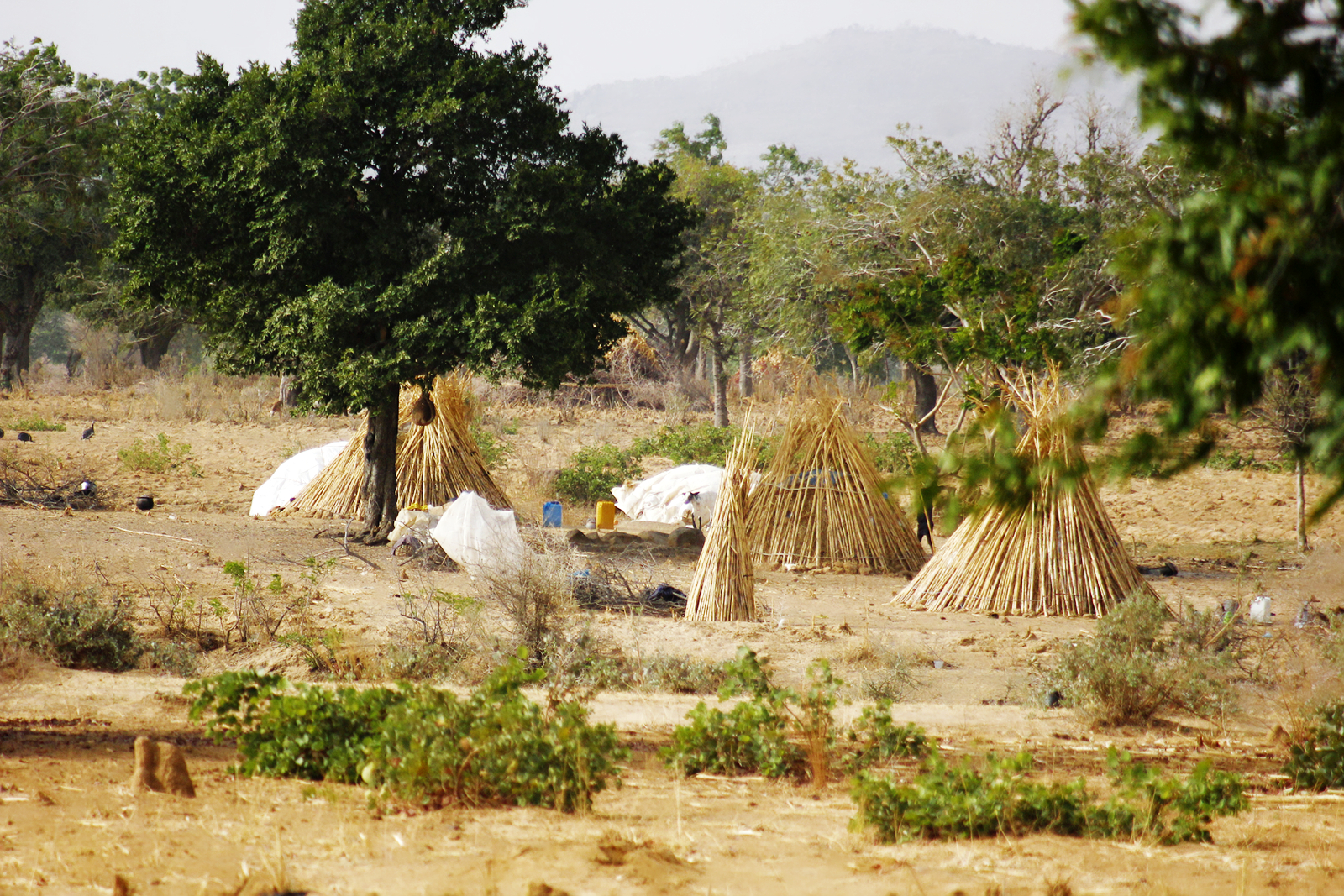
Garko Village.
