= Binta Sukai =

Nigerian fashion consultant

- Beauty pageant titleholder
- Title: Miss Nigeria 1990
- Major competition: Miss Nigeria 1990

Binta Sukai is a Nigerian fashion consultant and beauty pageant titleholder who shot into the limelight becoming the first northerner to win Miss Nigeria 1990.

Sukai's parents divorced when she was a child. She was raised by her Scottish grandparents in the United Kingdom where she was educated, but occasionally lived with her mother in Nigeria. She first came to the limelight when she became the first northerner to be crowned Miss Nigeria in 1990, but her eligibility to compete was questioned as she was rumoured to be non-Nigerian, until it was confirmed that the aspiring fashion designer was only one-quarters Scottish. Her father came from the Ham people in Southern Kaduna. Sukai continued to reside in the country for a few years after her reign before returning to Europe, enrolling at the Paris Academy of Fashion where she studied fashion and history.

In 2008, Sukai gave birth to her daughter. In an interview, she stated that she does not intend to marry the father, as she is afraid of divorce. Sukai has made several appearances at Nigerian fashion shows, where she is often a judge; these include the Runways Dreamz in 2007, and the Young Designers Creative Design competition in 2009.

In 2009, Sukai announced plans to launch the beauty pageant/reality show Face of Peace. In an interview she stated: "Africa and Nigeria especially, in the recent past, have witnessed series of ethno-religious crisis that have displaced families, orphaned children and destroyed homes and properties...The need to cushion the discomfort, hardship and reduce a re-occurrence or spread, prompted this unique and first of its kind concept to champion the cause of peace in Nigeria and Africa among others." However for unknown reasons the show never aired.
