= Eloho Efemuai =

Broadcaster

- Also known as: Eloho Efemuai
- Born: Eloho Jocelyn Amata; 20 July 1973 (age 53); Warri, Nigeria
- Origin: Edinburgh, Scotland
- Occupations: Broadcaster, Entrepreneur, Personal brand strategist, speaker, singer/songwriter
- Years active: 2014–present
- Website: elohoefemuai.co.uk

Eloho Jocelyn Efemuai (née, Amata; born 20 July 1973) is the founder and CEO of Adelphe Connect; a social enterprise committed to creating positive change that enhancss lives. She is also the founder of Heartsong Live Radio in Scotland. She is a radio broadcaster, speaker, & personal brand strategist as well as a musician. Her music style can be described as urban contemporary gospel music. She has released two studio albums: Arise (2014) and Unrestrained (2016). She has also authored two books: 'Start Your Day Right' and 'You Are Not Everyone's Cup of Tea'

== Early life and background ==
Efemuai was born Eloho Jocelyn Efemuai, on 20 July 1973, the youngest daughter of Ifoghale Amata and Joy Omotoyinbo, the sister of Fred Amata and Zach Amata. Her nephew is Jeta Amata.

== Music career ==
Her music recording career started in 2014 with the studio album, Arise, which was released on 15 March 2014. She released Unrestrained, her second studio album, on 29 July 2016. The single, "He's Alive", was released on her birthday, 20 July, on her YouTube channel.

== Discography ==
- Arise (15 March 2014)
- Unrestrained (29 July 2016)
