= Ajayi Crowther University =

Private university in Oyo, Nigeria

Coordinates: 7.8498°N 3.9485°E

- A.C.U.
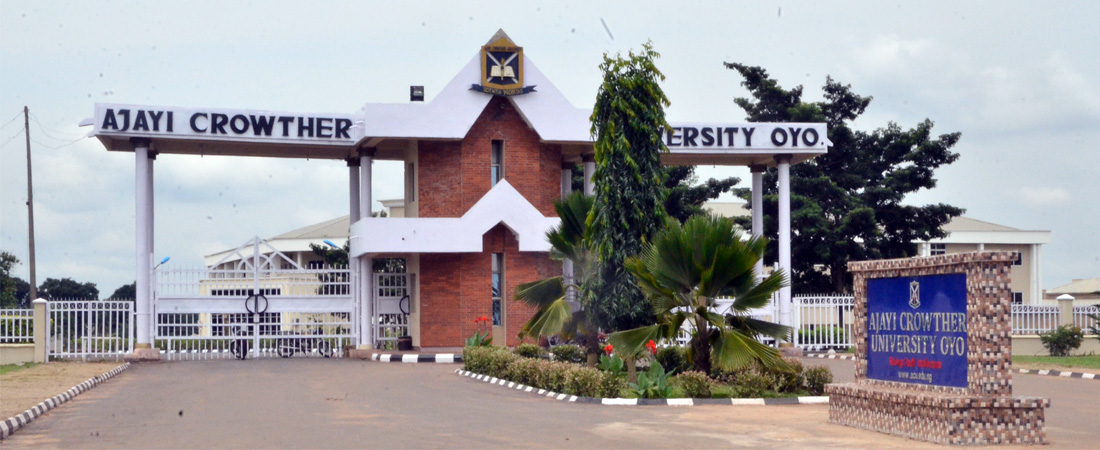
- Motto: Latin: Scentia Probitas
- Motto in English: "Knowledge with Probity"
- Established: 2005
- Chancellor: Tunde Afolabi
- Vice-Chancellor: Ebunoluwa Olufemi Oduwole
- Faculty: Faculty of Natural Science, Faculty of Law, Faculty of Social Science, Faculty of Management Science, Faculty of Humanities, Faculty of Engineering, Faculty of Education
- Location: Oyo, Oyo State, Nigeria
- Colours: Blue, White and Gold
- Website: http://acu.edu.ng/
- Location within Nigeria

Ajayi Crowther University (also known as ACU) is a private, faith-based university located in Oyo State, Nigeria.

The university is named after Samuel Ajayi Crowther.

== History ==
Ajayi Crowther University, was founded as a CMS Training Institution in Abeokuta in 1853. It relocated from Lagos to Oyo in 1920. It is owned by the Anglican Church in Nigeria - christened Church of Nigeria, Anglican Communion.

Initially, ACU was a Grade II Teachers' Certificate college. St. Andrews College, Oyo started a Divinity Course from 1910 to 1942. Ownership transitioned from the Church of Nigeria Anglican Communion to government control in 1977. It became an NCE campus in 1980 and a College of Education in 1985.

St. Andrews College became a university on September 7, 1999, with the Church of Nigeria approving SACOBA's proposal. Ajayi Crowther University was established on the premises of the former St. Andrews College. The university obtained its license on January 7, 2005, from the National Universities Commission.

== Leadership ==
Ajayi Crowther University appointed Professor Ebunoluwa Olufemi Oduwole as its 5th Vice Chancellor.

== Notable alumni ==
- Jumoke Odetola, Nigerian actress
- Adeniyi Drumz, Nigerian drummer
- Lekan KingKong, Nigerian content creator and entrepreneur
