= Elizabeth Elohor Isiorho =

Nigerian model

Elohor Elizabeth Isiorho
- Born: 23 March 1980 (age 46); London, UK
- Occupation: Modeling Agent
- Years active: 2004–present
- Website: www.bethmodelafrica.com

Elohor Elizabeth Isiorho (born 23 March 1980) is a Nigerian modelling agency pioneer, former beauty queen, founder of Beth Model Management Africa and Face of Africa, and entrepreneur.

== Early life and educational background ==
Elohor Elizabeth Isiorho was born in England on 23 March 1980. At age two, she and her family moved back to Nigeria. At 16, she returned to London to pursue a bachelor's degree after her secondary school education. She graduated from London Guildhall University (now known as London Metropolitan University) where she studied Business and Information Technology.

== Career ==
As a student, Isiorho participated in Miss Nigeria UK in 2001, a competition she won. After her victory, she took up modelling. Isiorho moved back to Nigeria in 2003 after modeling in the UK for 5 years. Upon returning to Lagos, Nigeria, she founded Beth Models (now Beth Model Management Africa) in 2004, the longest standing modeling agency in Nigeria, which has also been profiled as "Africa’s largest modelling agency." Isiorho has worked with international model organizations and models. In 2007, she secured a franchise deal with Elite Model Management Paris to organise 'Elite Model Look Nigeria'.

Isiorho is known to have discovered and launched the careers of some of the most successful Nigerian models, namely Mayowa Nicholas, the first Nigerian model to grace the Victoria's Secret runway; Victor Ndigwe, Davidson Obennebo, Nneoma Anosike, Jeffery Obed, Tobi Momoh, Olaniyan Olamijuwon, among others.

Isiorho is also chief executive officer (CEO) of Face of Africa, adjudged to be "the largest casting of models in Africa." She is the CEO of Prive Luxury Wedding and Event Company, and Prive Atelier

== Recognition & awards ==
Isiorho won Miss Nigeria UK in 2001. She has been featured in several covers and interviews in Forbes, Glamour South Africa, Dazed Digital, Brides, Women of the city, Guardian Life, Vanguard Allure, The Will Downtown, among others. Isiorho has received awards in the fashion and entertainment industry including modelling agency of the year three times in a row, an award for outstanding establishments for establishing the first modelling agency in Nigeria.

In 2023, she was named a part of BoF500.
