= BBC Somali Service =

BBC World Service radio station

BBC Somali
- Type: Radio network and website
- Country: United Kingdom Somaliland
- Availability: International
- Endowment: Foreign and Commonwealth Office, UK
- Owner: BBC
- Launch date: 18 July 1957
- Webcast: www.bbc.com/somali/bbc_somali_radio/liveradio
- Official website: www.bbc.com/somali/
- Language: Somali

The BBC Somali Service is a BBC World Service radio station transmitted in the Somali language and based in Broadcasting House in West London and in Hargeisa, where most of the radio and digital operations are based. Most of the listeners live in the Horn of Africa and nearby regions. According to the station, it provides a key link between those in Somaliland and those elsewhere.

== History ==
Established on 18 July 1957 with two weekly programmes of 15 minutes each, the station made the broadcasts daily by September 1958, and on 1 July 1961 the two parts were joined and the programme time increased to 30 minutes. Increases in broadcast frequency have been made since. They currently broadcast 3 half-hour programmes and one 1-hour programme daily. The station has been developing local networks in all over Somali speaking areas in Somaliland, Djibouti, the Somali border of Yemen and North Eastern Eritrea plus the Somali diaspora all over the world. In August 2010 AllAfrica.com reported that Shabelle Media Network had started broadcasting some of the station's programmes.

Since Yusuf Garad left the BBC, the Somali service never returned to the management of a Somali professional. First, Andres Ilves had been appointed as acting head of the service for nearly two years then Josephine Hazeley, deputy head of BBC Somaliland, had been appointed as a caretaker. Following the most competitive and never for seen multiply layered recruitment process for a new BBC Somali Editor, Abdirahman Koronto with masters degree in Broadcast (International) Journalism from UK’s Westminster University was successfully selected and offered a slightly altered role BBC Somali Output Editor, responsible for all output of the section including producers, presenters, newsreaders, reporters, fixers and correspondents reporting to him in terms of Output while also appointing a managing co-editor from the BBC French Service, Ibrahima Diane who was appointed as the acting co-editor of BBC Somali. Abdirahman Koronto left the BBC Somali Service on 31 June 2016 to join the USAID project Tis+ as Technical Coordinator -Strategic Communication on stabilization. After 3 years a new role was created and advertised for a joint Swahili and Somali service based in Nairobi, Kenya. Caroline Karobia was named editor of the new service. In June 2017, the BBC decided to split the Swahili and Somali services. In August 2017, Abdullahi Abdi Sheikh was appointed as Editor, BBC Somali Service. On 28 October 2019, Abdullahi Abdi Sheikh was sacked. On 16 March 2020, Muhyadin Roble who worked at Radio Ergo (formerly IRIN SOMALI SERVICE) was appointed as editor of the service. The first ever externally hired head of service to lead BBC Somali.

== Radio broadcasts ==
In addition to the online webcast, the BBC Somali radio programmes are known to be broadcast on FM in 5 areas as of December 2024: Zeila, Berbera, Hargeisa, Burao, and Sanaa.

As of 23 December 2024, the Al-Dhabiyya (United Arab Emirates), Al Ashkharah, and Talata Volonondry transmitting stations were known to broadcast Somali programming on varying shortwave frequencies, with the hours ranging from 1 hour 30 minutes on Mondays-Fridays to 8 hours on Sundays.

== Praise ==
Charles Allen wrote in 1997 that in Somalia, a country having "three or four separate ruling factions, each with their own radio services", the station is the "one single voice which serves all Somali speakers, and keeps the idea of being Somali alive". The station is successful, Allan reports, partly because of their aim to have reporting originating in the Somali language, rather than having translations from English. Pierce Gerety, a UNICEF representative in Somalia, said it is the most important news source in the country, and that many of the citizens were listeners. Anthony Oldin contrasts its perceived unbiased reporting with the media in Rwanda during the 1994 genocide, in which news organisations spread misinformation and encouraged ethnic groups to kill one another. In partnership with the Africa Education Trust the station launched in March 2002 an educational programme in Somalia.

The station is important for Somalis in the United Kingdom, because they rely on it to connect to Somalia. A poll by the station found that 99 percent of Somalis in the UK listen to it. Somalis view radio listening as a social activity, and therefore listen in khat houses, mosques, and Somali shops.

== Criticism ==
The station has, however, received criticism. Siad Barre, the president of Somalia, said in 1985 the station and the West had misrepresented his country, and criticised it for speaking to Somali dissidents who had hijacked a Somali Airlines plane.

In 2006, a former service member for over 30 years said the station's aim is to spread British propaganda and that they are keen to see Somalia split up.

In 2007, Jimma Times reported that people in Somalia were accusing the station of being biased, one person saying the station was engaging in a "media propaganda war".

In March 2010, Liban Ahmad, a former trainee at the BBC, accused the station of misleading listeners, citing examples of headlines from the station such as "Somaliland Guantanamo" and "Soomaali al Qaacida ah" (Al Qaida Somalis).

In April 2010, Ibrahim Sheikh-Nor, writing in Hiiraan Online, accused Omar of having excessive control over the station and of running it like a "proprietor outfit".

== Notable people ==
- Ahmed Abdinur (1996–2019)
- Ahmed Hassan Awke
- Hassan Barise
- Aden Nuh Dhule
- Ahmed Said Egeh
- Hassan Gallaydh
- Abdullahi Hajji
- Abdisalam Hareri
- Abdinur Sh. Mohamed Ishaq (1986–2019)
- Katty Isse
- Ahmed Mohamed Kismayo (1997–2013)
- Abdirahman Koronto
- Said Ali Muse
- Yonis Ali Nur (?–2017)
- Yusuf Garaad Omar
- Amina Muse Wehliye

== See also ==
- BBC Bangla
- BBC Hausa
- BBC Persian
- BBC Urdu
- Somali Broadcasting Corporation
