= BBC Bangla =

Bengali-language service of the BBC World Service

BBC News Bangla
- Logo of BBC News Bangla
- Type: Online news portal, internet, and television broadcasts
- Country: United Kingdom; Bangladesh; India (West Bengal and Tripura)
- Availability: International
- Endowment: Foreign and Commonwealth Office, UK
- Owner: BBC
- Key people: Mir Sabbir (Editor)
- Launch date: 11 October 1941; 85 years ago
- Official website: bbc.com/bengali

BBC News Bangla (Bengali: বিবিসি নিউজ বাংলা, romanized: Bibisi Niuj Bāṅlā) is the Bengali language service of the BBC World Service, inaugurated in 1941 for Bengali audiences worldwide especially the ones in the Bengal region, which includes the sovereign state of Bangladesh and the Indian states of West Bengal and Tripura. It conveys the latest political, social, economic and sports news relevant to Bangladesh, India and the world.

== History ==
BBC Bangla was launched on 11 October 1941 with a 15-minute programme under the BBC World Service. BBC Bangla's headquarters used to be Bush House, but since 2012, it has been broadcast from Broadcasting House in London as well as from BBC bureaux in Dhaka and Kolkata. In September 2022, BBC Bangla announced its cessation of radio broadcasts due to financial reasons.

On 31 December 2022, BBC Bangla officially ceased broadcasting on radio after 81 years of service following the Parikrama program. Despite this, it continued its existence on television and the internet.

== Broadcasting ==
The programmes of BBC News Bangla are broadcast on their website, television and social media sites like Facebook and YouTube. BBC Bangla reaches over a million Bengali speaking people. Its radio and online services have listeners from many Bengali communities including those in Bangladesh, West Bengal, Tripura and Assam.

== Programming ==
BBC News Bangla mainly focuses on news-based daily programming and political news. They also broadcast entertainment programmes, sports news, news analyses and discussions about daily newspapers' lead stories. In addition, they respond to and discuss messages and opinions from the audience.

=== Broadcasts on FM Radio ===
BBC Bangla stopped its radio broadcasts on 31 December 2022, after 81 years of service.

- Dhaka - FM 100
- Kolkata - FM 90.4
- Barisal - FM 105
- Comilla - FM 103.6
- Cox's Bazar - FM 100.8
- Thakurgaon - FM 92
- Chittagong - FM 88.8
- Rangpur - FM 88.8
- Rajshahi - FM 88.8
- Sylhet - FM 88.8
- Khulna - FM 88.8

== Bangladesh Sanglap ==
BBC Bangladesh Sanglap (Bengali: বিবিসি বাংলাদেশ সংলাপ) was a live programme of the BBC Bangla service broadcast in association with Bangladeshi satellite channel Channel I from 2005 to 2015 in three seasons. The main focus of this programme was questions from the general public to relevant authorities about important issues.

== See also ==
- BBC Persian
- BBC Hausa
- BBC Somali
