= Daily Times (Nigeria) =

Nigerian daily newspaper

- Type: Media publication
- Format: Print and online
- Publisher: Fidelis Anosike of Folio Communications
- Editor: Omokioja Julius Eto
- Founded: 6 June 1925
- Language: English
- Headquarters: Lagos, Lagos State, Nigeria
- Circulation: Nationwide
- Website: dailytimesng.com

The Daily Times is a Nigerian newspaper with headquarters in Lagos. In the 1970s, it was one of the most successful locally owned businesses in Africa.

The paper went into decline after it was purchased by the government in 1975. What was left was sold to a private investor, Fidelis Anosike, in 2004. Folio Communications Limited officially assumed the ownership of the Daily Times of Nigeria Plc on September 3, 2004. The company was not and is still not a consortium. It is a private limited-liability company.

The printing of the flagship title The Daily Times resumed after the assumption of ownership in earnest from 2006 until 2009, partially to satisfy the embedded requirements contingent upon the Enterprise Sale Deed while company turnaround and restructuring continued.

Although the flagship Daily Times returned to the streets in December 2014, further efforts have been made towards the return of the other viable titles, especially the Sunday Times, the Weekend Times and the Lagos Weekend, to the streets.

== Early years ==
The Nigerian Printing and Publishing Company, publishers of the Daily Times was incorporated on 6 June 1925 by Richard Barrow, Adeyemo Alakija, V.R. Osborne and others. They printed the first copy as The Nigerian Daily Times on 1 June 1926. Alakija was an African, while the other founders represented European interest groups in the Lagos chamber of commerce. The company resolved to acquire the African Messenger published by Ernest Ikoli and takeover the publication of Reuters news bulletin to service the business community. Ernest Ikoli was the first editor and Alakija was chairman of the board. Alakija and Ikoli became involved with the nationalist Nigerian Youth Movement. Later, Ikoli became a member of the Legislative Council in 1941, while Alakija was appointed to the governor's Executive Council in 1943.

In 1928, the new publication began to gain advertising income from foreign firms operating within the country and in the next ten years arise to dominate advertising by expatriate firms. The paper adopted a policy of detachment from local political issues opting to focus on supporting issues about Nigerian progress. In the early 1930s the pan-Africanist Dusé Mohamed Ali joined the paper as a journalist at the age of 65. He later moved on to found the influential journal The Comet. The Daily Times became a popular voice of the nationalist movement. Education was one of the first issues. In a 1934 editorial the paper opposed Native Authority schools, which they saw as controlled by stooges of the colonial administration, and advocated independent mission schools. The first tertiary institute in the colony, Yaba College, opened in January 1934. The Nigerian Daily Times described it as "a grand idea, and imposing structure, resting on rather weak foundations ... we wish to declare emphatically that this country will not be satisfied with an inferior brand [of education] such as the present scheme seems to threaten".

R. B. Paul, a Liverpool businessman, who had interest in West Africa magazine and later the West African Review bought the paper in 1935. When Nnamdi Azikiwe ("Zik") launched his West African Pilot in 1937, dedicated to fighting for independence from British colonial rule, many established papers such as the Nigerian Dailytimes lost a large part of their audience. The Daily Times responded by raising foreign capital and injecting fresh blood into the editorial team. In addition, the new owners hired more expatriate staff to fill the post of business manager, managing editor and works manager. But the newspaper struggled with newsprint supply during World War II and number of paper printed dropped.

== Peak years ==
In 1947 the London-based Daily Mirror Group, headed by Cecil King, bought the Daily Times, the Gold Coast Daily Graphic, the Accra Sunday Mirror and the Sierra Leone Daily Mail. King introduced the first privately owned rotary printing press in Nigeria, plus photo-engraving, typesetting and typecasting plants. He imported skilled journalists but followed a deliberate Africanization policy. The Mirror Group introduced popular innovations such as short paragraphs and sentences, many illustrations and photos, and human interest stories. The paper's circulation rose from 25,000 daily in 1950 to 95,000 in 1959. During the 1950s the Nigerian Daily Times played an important role in the process that led to independence in 1960. At the beginning of the 1950s, the firm hired Percy Roberts, a journalist as editorial adviser and later General Manager. Roberts produced sister publications such as the Sunday Times and the Sporting Record.

Ismail Babatunde Jose had joined the paper in 1941 as a technical trainee. He was soon promoted to reporter, then regional correspondent and eventually assistant editor. Cecil King appointed him editor in 1957. Jose became managing director in 1962 and chairman in 1968. He changed the name of the flagship newspaper to its present Daily Times Nigeria on 30 May 1963. Jose was in charge at a time when the oil boom was starting in Nigeria and advertising revenue was plentiful. Jose hired young graduates and trained them to become self-confident, independent reporters and columnists. In 1965 he established the Times Journalism Institute, which was still training journalists forty years later.

In 1957 the newspaper organised the first beauty pageant in Nigeria, Miss Nigeria, and ran the pageant without competition for many years. Rosemary Anieze, Miss Nigeria 1960, was renamed Miss Independence, and one of the most publicized beauty queens in the history of Nigeria.

In 1963 the Daily Times launched the magazines Modern Woman and the Flamingo.

Starting in 1963, ownership of the paper was gradually transferred to Nigerians, a process that was completed by 31 March 1974.

By the 1970s the paper dominated the Nigerian publishing industry with a string of related papers and magazines. By 1975 the Daily Times had grown to a circulation of 275,000 copies while the Sunday Times reached 400,000. No other Nigerian newspaper has achieved such levels apart from MKO Abiola's Daily Concord in the early 1990s.

== Public ownership ==
On 1 September 1975, the Federal Government of Nigeria acquired 60% of the Daily Times and its main rival, the New Nigerian Newspaper. A government statement read:

"The Federal Military Government wants to state that its acquisition of the total ownership of New Nigeria and equity (60%) of DTN [Daily Times Nigeria] will in no manner contrail the independence of the newspapers published by the two establishments. Government wants to underline its policy of full support of press freedom at all times".

This statement was viewed as questionable, since the takeover was clearly designed to reduce criticism of the military government.

In March 1976, Jose was forced out of his position. In 1977 the government assumed total ownership and control.

At first the paper did retain a degree of editorial independence. In 1979 the Evening News, owned by the Daily Times, published an article saying that Chief Rotimi Williams was being sued by the children of a deceased client. Rotimi successfully sued the government-owned newspaper for libel. In the 1980s and into the 1990s the paper ran frequent editorials denouncing corruption and deploring the decline in morals.

In 1981 the editor, Tony Momoh, was summoned to appear before the Senate led by its president, Joseph Wayas, on charges of contempt. In what became a cause célèbre, Momoh established the right for his paper to protect its sources. In a 1983 editorial the Daily Times stated "[T]he rate of corruption, bribery, indiscipline, immorality, cheating, idleness, drug addiction, armed robbery, smuggling and other vices has currently assumed an alarming proportion in this country".

Onyema Ugochukwu had risen through the ranks, becoming the first editor of the Business Times before going to London in 1983 for a four-year stint as Editor of West Africa magazine. When he returned in 1987 he was appointed editor-in-chief of the Daily Times. In April 1990, the editor of The Punch was arrested for publishing a cartoon that implied Nigerians were unhappy that a recent attempted coup by Gideon Orkar had failed. As president of the Nigerian Guild of Editors, Ugochukwu coordinated a campaign to persuade the government to release The Punch's editor. Ugochukwu played a conciliatory role between the press and the military government until he resigned from the paper as executive director of publications in 1994.

Circulation steadily declined as the administrations of Generals Ibrahim Babangida and Sani Abacha tightened control over the newspaper in the 1990s, and the public turned to livelier independent publications.

The newspaper was mismanaged. On 16 December 1998, shortly before the return to civilian rule, hundreds of workers of the Daily Times began an indefinite strike because their salaries were five months in arrears.

Under the civilian administration of President Olusegun Obasanjo, the Bureau of Public Enterprises started the process of returning the Daily Times to private ownership. After a failed attempt at a public offer (IPO), the Daily Times Nigeria Plc was advertised for sale in 2003. In 2004 Folio Communications was approved as the preferred bidder, gaining control with 96.5% of shares.

== Folio Communications ==
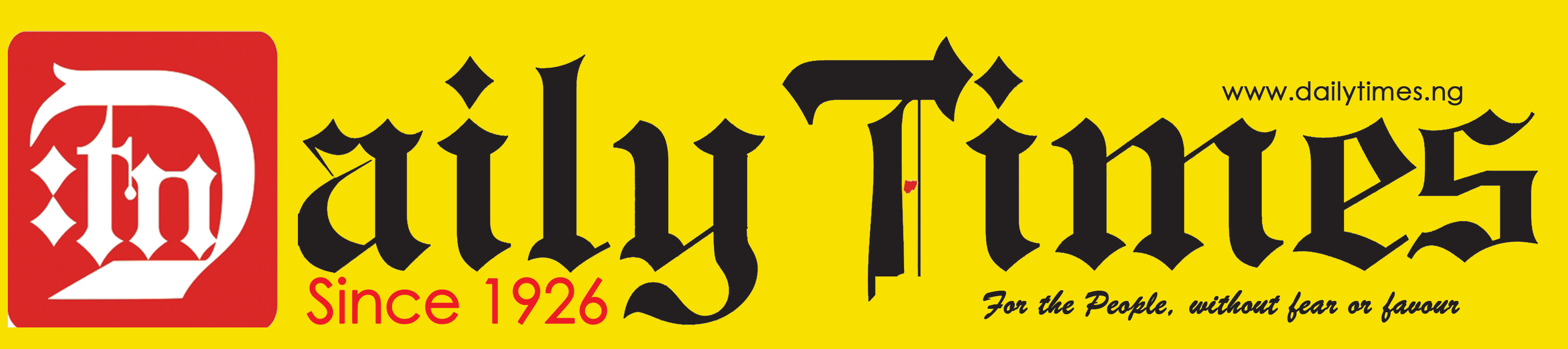
Newspaper header

The sale process was confused, resulting in various lawsuits. Former employees did not receive their termination benefits. Later, Folio did pay some of the employees who had been laid off when the newspaper was closed in 2007, but many had not been paid by 2010 despite efforts by their union to obtain the money owed them. Folio Communications, who formally took over the media giant on 14 March 2007, was accused of asset stripping.

According to the main owner, Fidelis Anosike, the Dailytimes had large real estate holdings but the equipment and buildings were obsolete. Anosike said he appointed Ben Okoye to handle disposal of some assets to fund modernization. When Okoye and his friend, Senator Ikechukwu Obiorah, realized the extent of the real estate assets, they started planning a hostile takeover and initiated court proceedings to prevent the company being turned around before then.

In April 2010 the Attorney-General of the Federation filed a 21-count charge of conspiracy and stealing of over N3 billion worth of property belonging to Dailytimes Nigeria against the brothers Fidelis and Noel Anosike, owners of Folio Communications. In March 2011, a Federal High Court sitting in Lagos quashed the charges against the Anosikes. A Lagos High Court also cleared Senator Ikechukwu Obiora from being investigated by the police over an alleged issuance of dud cheques to Folio Communications. Later that month another judge failed to uphold the annulment of the charges against the owners.

As of April 2011, the print newspaper had still not restarted production.
