= Oluwatoyosi Ogunseye =

Nigerian editor and journalist

Toyosi Ogunseye
- Education: University of Lagos
- Occupations: President & CEO
- Employer: The Presidential Precinct

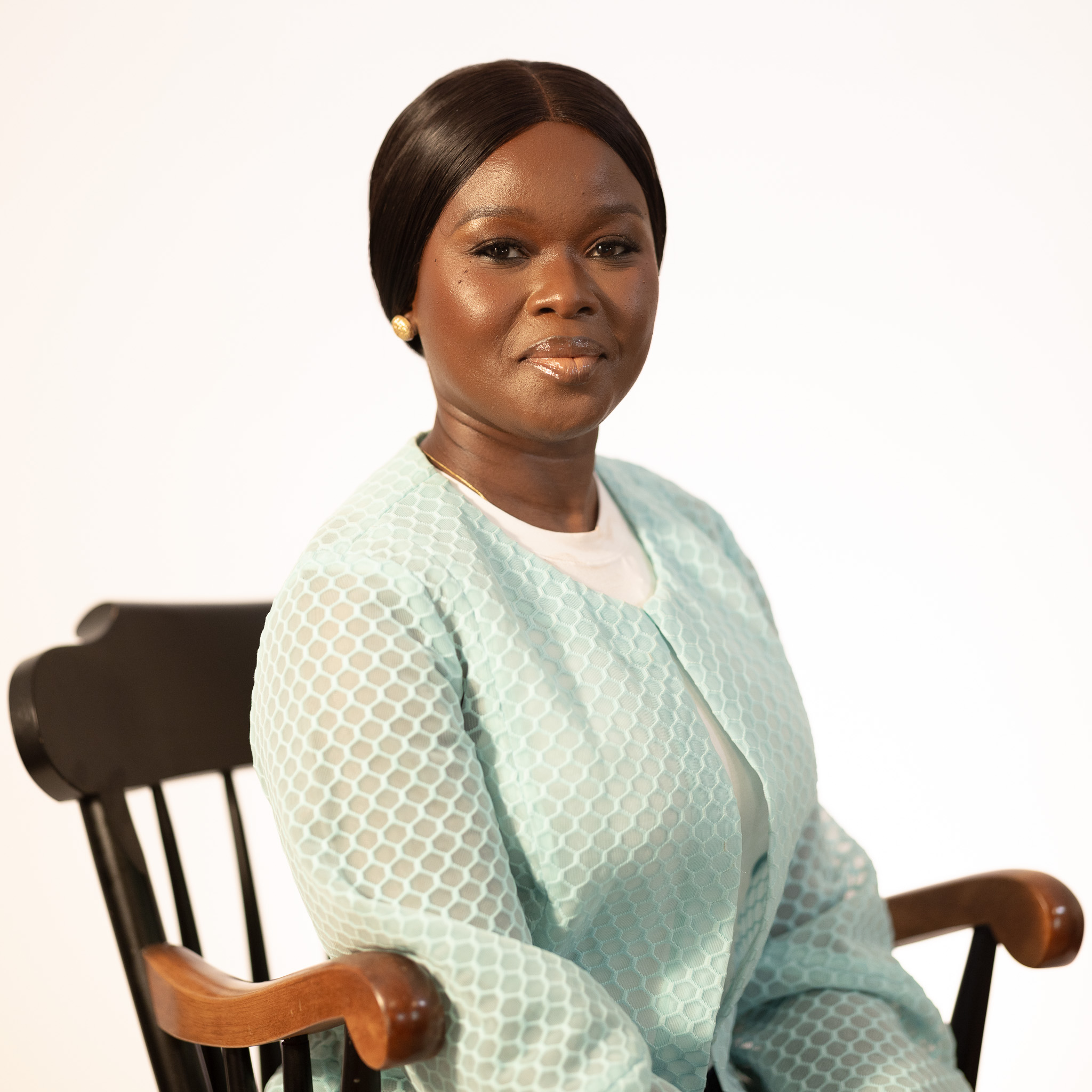
Toyosi Ogunseye, President & CEO of the Presidential Precinct

Oluwatoyosi Ogunseye is a Nigerian journalist, and as of August 2023, the President & CEO of the Presidential Precinct. She formerly served as the head of language services (West Africa) at BBC World Service and was the first female Sunday editor of The Punch Newspaper. She is also a 2014 Mandela Washington Fellowship Alumna, having completed her Fellowship at the Presidential Precinct.

== Early life and education ==
Ogunseye was born in Nigeria into the Yoruba ethnic group. She is a graduate of University of Lagos where she received a bachelor's degree in Biochemistry; thereafter she got a post-graduate diploma in print journalism from the Nigerian Institute of Journalism. In 2010, she earned a master's degree in Media and Communications from Pan-Atlantic University.

== Career ==
Ogunseye ventured into journalism as a second year student of the department of Biochemistry, University of Lagos when Musa Egbemana gave her a shot at reporting news happening in University of Lagos to be published on The Sun Newspaper at the time when Femi Adesina was the editor in 2004 and later moved to News Star Newspaper as a senior correspondent in 2007. In 2009, she joined The Punch Newspaper as the sub-assistant editor for news and politics till 2012. Toyosi has been an investigative journalist since 2006, before she became an editor she worked for Sunday Punch as both news editor and senior correspondent, specializing in crime on both local and international levels. She is the first and youngest female editor at The Punch Newspaper.

Ogunseye has won over 25 media awards including the health category of the CNN MultiChoice African Journalist of the Year Awards in 2011 and 2013, Nigerian Academy of Science Journalist of the Year 2013, The Future Awards Africa 2013, Child-Friendly Reporter of the Year by the Diamond Awards for Media Excellence (DAME).
