= BBC Hausa =

Hausa-language part of the BBC World Service

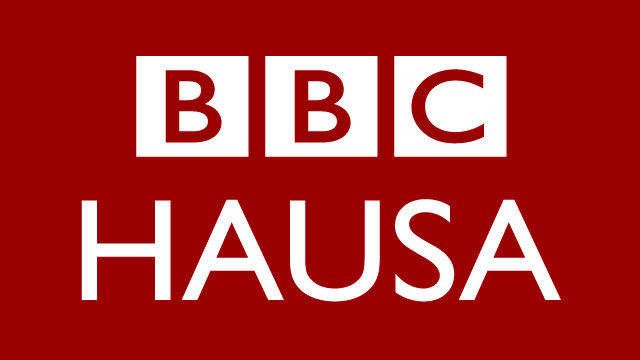
- Type: Radio network and website
- Country: United Kingdom
- Availability: International
- Owner: BBC
- Launch date: 13 March 1957
- Webcast: www.bbc.com/hausa/bbc_hausa_radio/liveradio
- Official website: www.bbc.com/hausa/
- Language: Hausa

BBC Hausa is the Hausa-language service of the BBC World Service meant primarily for Hausa-speaking communities in Nigeria, Ghana, Niger and other Hausa speakers across West Africa. It is part of the BBC's foreign language output of 43 languages, of which eleven are African languages. The service includes a radio station, a bureau office based in Abuja and a frequently-updated website which serves as a news portal and provides information as well as analysis in text, audio and video formats and online access to radio broadcasts. The radio service is broadcast from Broadcasting House in London with preliminary editing done at the BBC's bureau office in Abuja.

== History ==
BBC Hausa was the first African-language service operated by the BBC and is one of the five African languages it broadcasts. The service was launched on 13 March 1957 at 09:30 GMT with a 15-minute programme by the BBC World Service presented by Aminu Abdullahi Malumfashi: a translated version was later read by Abubakar Tunau in the programme West Africa in the News. The programme was then aired on Wednesdays and Fridays, with daily programmes beginning one year later on 1 June 1958, and has continuously done so since.

In March 2017, the BBC celebrated the Hausa service's 60th anniversary in Abuja, with attendants including the director of the BBC World Service group, Fran Unsworth, quoted as saying in part:

"We are very proud of the BBC Hausa service and the many years of vital broadcasting it has provided for our audience. This fantastic milestone shows its great success, and long may it continue".

Nigerian president Muhammadu Buhari also sent a voice message at the occasion where he made known that he was a loyal listener of the service and spent many years listening to its programmes.

In its early days BBC rose to prominence in Hausa speaking world due to style of its reporting. It has conducted interviews with many prominent African politicians.

=== Abuja office ===
The BBC's Abuja office was opened in 2002.

== Broadcasting ==
The service has, among other roles, senior editors, producers, assistant editors and senior reporters. There are also stringers in key Nigerian cities such as Kaduna, Kano, Jos, Enugu, Abuja and Sokoto as well as overseas stringers in Niger, Ghana and China.

=== Rebroadcasting by Nigerian radio stations ===
Many BBC programmes are rebroadcast by Nigerian media houses through a special partnership with the BBC World Service, including the following:

- Yola, Adamawa State – Radio Gotel - 917 kHz AM
- Maiduguri, Borno State – BRTV - 94.5 FM
- Dutse, Jigawa State – Freedom Radio - 99.5FM
- Kaduna, Kaduna State – Freedom Radio - 99.5FM
- Kano, Kano State – Freedom Radio - 99.5FM
- Jos, Plateau State – PRTV - 88.65 FM, 92.1 FM, 90.5 FM and 1313 kHz AM
- Sokoto, Sokoto State – Rima Radio - 97.1FM, 540 kHz AM

=== Shortwave frequencies ===
As of 23 December 2024, the Ascension Island and Woofferton transmitting stations were known to broadcast Hausa programming on varying shortwave frequencies, with the hours ranging from 2 hours on Mondays-Thursdays to 9 hours on Saturdays.

=== Online presence ===
BBC Hausa website in 2017.

With the advent of digital means of communication, listenership through traditional radio sets have been steadily declining since the 1990s. BBC Hausa radio reaches around 17.7 million people every week and its website is one of the most visited in Nigeria.

== Perception of the service ==
A 2010 research report by the BBC Trust found that there is "a wide distrust of local media in the Hausa speaking regions of Africa where locals perceive local broadcasters and journalists as open to manipulation."

== See also ==
- BBC Urdu
- BBC Persian
- BBC Bangla
- BBC Somali
