= Reza Alinejad =

Iranian juvenile offender

Reza Alinejad رضا علی نژاد
- Born: September 21, 1985 (age 41); Shiraz, Iran
- Status: Exonerated; Free from prison
- Conviction: Murder
- Penalty: Death by hanging

Reza Alinejad (Persian: رضا علی نژاد) (born September 21, 1985) is an Iranian man who, at the age of 17, was accused of killing another man in self defence and sentenced to death by hanging.

== Background information ==
In December 2002, while eating at a local marketplace in Fasa, Iran, Reza and his friend were confronted by a group of older men who verbally assaulted the two teenagers. The verbal altercation escalated, and one member of the group that had initiated the confrontation with Reza and his friend pulled out a weapon and began to beat the teens. In an attempt to defend himself and his friend against the attack, Reza pulled out a pocket knife, and while covering his face and eyes from the blows with his left hand, he attempted to ward off his attackers with the knife in his right hand. As Reza struggled with his attackers in this manner, he stabbed one of them with the knife. The stabbing ultimately led to the attacker's death, and Reza was arrested on charges of murder and was sentenced to death by hanging.

During the initial investigation of this case, a number of exculpatory facts were established for the record, including the testimony of the decedent's friend, who was present when the altercation took place. The eyewitness admitted that he and his friend were the ones who had started the altercation, and without provocation from Reza and his friend, they had attacked the two teenagers with their weapons. The eyewitness testified that the teenagers did not have any way of escaping the altercation as they were surrounded and overpowered. They were severely beaten, leaving them with serious injuries that required them to be hospitalized. As such, the eyewitness admitted that the attacks that he and his by-then deceased friend's actions were so aggressive that he could understand why Reza and his friend had acted as they had to defend their lives.

Another eyewitness—who was not a participant in the altercation—confirmed these facts. His testimony, in addition to other evidence in the case, left little doubt that Reza had engaged in self-defense, and that he had no choice but to use necessary force to save his own life as well as that of his younger friend.

Despite evidence supporting Reza's claim that he stabbed the man in self-defense, as well as the fact that he was a minor at the time of the incident, Reza Alinejad was sentenced to qesas (retribution) for murder by Section 6 of the Criminal Court in Fasa on October 4, 2003.

When the case reached Iran's highest court for review in December 2004, this death sentence was rejected by the judge, who accepted that the teenager had acted in self-defence. The judge acknowledged that the instigators of the dispute were the dead man and his friend, that they had attacked Reza Alinejad and his friend with the nunchaku and had injured them, and that the stabbing by Reza Alinejad had not been intentional.

The Supreme Court remanded the case to another lower court for review. The case was heard for a second time by branch 101 of Fasa Criminal Court. On June 15, 2005, the lower court sentenced Reza to death again, concluding that he could have fled the scene and had therefore acted unreasonably. On May 9, 2006, Iran's Supreme Court upheld the death sentence.

According to Lily Mazahery, an Iranian-American human rights lawyer and a human rights advocate who has worked on a number of similar cases, the rulings in Reza's case violated international law and standards. This is because at the time of the incident, Reza was a minor. Article 37 of the Convention on the Right of the Child, to which the Islamic Republic of Iran is a signatory, prohibits the execution of individuals for acts or crimes committed before the age of majority.

Reza's death sentence drew widespread criticism from human rights organizations and advocates around the world, including the issuance of Urgent Action Alerts by Amnesty International to stop the execution.

Reza's case was transferred to Iran's Head of Judiciary Mahmoud Hashemi Shahroudi for review.

Reza's brother, Meghada Alinejad, along with other members of Reza's family, have pleaded for international help.

In December 2007, in a letter to Nazanin Afshin-Jam, Reza's brother, Ali Alinejad sent the copy of the mediation order by Iran's head of judiciary that stated: "Considering the age of the convicted and the unintentional circumstances that he was faced, the file is ordered to be returned to judiciary court in (city of) Fasa. Through Mediation council or by any other means; more efforts and attempts must be made in order to bring a resolution between parents of the victim and the murder convict."

== Release ==
Reza was released on December 3, 2008, after the victim's family (Dooroodi) demanded and accepted financial compensation (diyeh, blood money). The Alinejad family spoke to SCE (Stop Child Executions) President Nazanin Afshin-Jam shortly after his release to thank the team for all efforts to help save Reza. Reza maintains his innocence and says that the death of Esmail Dooroodi was as a result of defending himself against him and the other attacker Mohammad Firouzi.

== See also ==
- Stop Child Executions Campaign
- Delara Darabi
- Nazanin Fatehi
- Mosleh Zamani
- Atefeh Rajabi
- Human rights in Iran
- Ministry of Intelligence and National Security (Iran)
