= Delara Darabi =

Iranian artist (1986–2009)

- Delara Darabi
- Born: 29 September 1986; Rasht, Iran
- Died: 1 May 2009 (aged 22); Rasht, Iran
- Other names: The Prisoner of Colors; Aram
- Occupations: Painter, poet
- Status: Executed
- Conviction: Murder
- Penalty: Death by hanging

Delara Darabi (Persian: دلارا دارابى; 29 September 1986 – 1 May 2009) was an Iranian woman who was sentenced to death after having been convicted of murdering her father's female cousin in 2003. Although Delara initially claimed that she had committed the crime, she subsequently recanted and explained that her older boyfriend, Amir Hossein, had persuaded her to lie about the incident to protect him. According to Delara and other sources familiar with the case, Amir Hossein was the person who had committed the murder in an attempt to steal from a wealthy member of the Darabi family. She was hanged in Rasht Prison on 1 May 2009.

Darabi served six years of a prison sentence for theft on death row after her conviction (In Iran, prisoners often have to serve time in prison before execution). She initially confessed, but later recanted, claiming her boyfriend, Amir Hossein, persuaded her to confess by convincing her that he would be executed (as she would not have been in most places, being a minor; but this was not the case in Iran).

While on death row, Darabi, having developed a love of painting at an early age, completed several works that depicted her incarceration. In confinement, she also wrote poetry. Among her work is the poem entitled "Prison", a psychological and philosophical work on life in prison. A collection of her art was displayed at an exhibition in Tehran by supporters campaigning her release. Darabi's lawyer, Abdolsamad Khoramshahi, had appealed against the sentence, arguing that her conviction had been based solely on her confession and that her trial had failed to consider vital evidence.

== Biography ==
Darabi was born in the northern city of Rasht, in the province of Gilan. Darabi was hanged in the morning of 1 May 2009. The news of her hanging was announced to the world by Iranian-American lawyer, Lily Mazahery, who posted the information on Twitter.

== Trial and sentence ==
Darabi was tried by a lower court in Rasht, found guilty and sentenced to death. Her lawyer was Abdolsamad Khorramshahi. The sentence was upheld by the Supreme Court. She maintained her innocence, and claimed that she was under the influence of drugs during the burglary, despite making a confession and pleading guilty earlier. At this stage the Head of the Judiciary had the power to order a stay of execution and a review of the case. The boyfriend Amir Hossein reportedly received a prison sentence of 10 years as an accessory to the crime.

Amnesty International made several public statements about Darabi.

Darabi was a painter and wrote a few poems during her lifetime. She had used her paintings and poems to express her feelings. In 2008 there was an exhibition of her paintings in Tehran; a similar exhibition was held in Stockholm in April 2007.

Darabi attempted suicide by cutting her wrists on 20 January 2007. However, her cellmate noticed and called for help. She was rushed to hospital.

== Petitions for clemency ==
An online petition to save Delara from execution was drafted and circulated around the world. The petition appealed to Iranian authorities, particularly the country's head of judiciary, to observe international treaties and standards and to commute Delara's sentence. However, there was no way the judiciary could do so, since the victim's family demanded qisas, or retribution (the death penalty) rather than diyya, which is blood money. Amnesty International arranged for letters in support of Darabi to be sent to Iranian authorities.

== Background information ==
As a party to the International Covenant on Civil and Political Rights (ICCPR) and the Convention on the Rights of the Child (CRC), Iran has entered into diplomatic commitments not to execute persons for offences committed when they were under 18. Nevertheless, since 1990, Iran has executed at least 18 people for crimes committed when they were juveniles. In 2005 alone, despite being urged in the January by the UN Committee on the Rights of the Child to suspend the practice immediately, at least eight juvenile offenders were executed, including two who were still under 18 at the time of their execution. Before Darabi's, the last recorded execution of a juvenile offender, Rostam Tajik, was on 10 December 2005.

On 9 December 2005, Philip Alston, the UN Special Rapporteur on extrajudicial, summary or arbitrary executions, stated: "At a time when virtually every other country in the world has firmly and clearly renounced the execution of people for crimes they committed as children, the Iranian approach is particularly unacceptable ... it is all the more surprising because the obligation to refrain from such executions is not only clear and incontrovertible, but the Government of Iran has itself stated that it will cease this practice."

According to the penal code of the Islamic Republic of Iran, children are considered criminally responsible for their actions as adults at the age of puberty. Pursuant to Article 1210, Addendum 1, girls reach the age of puberty 6 years before their male counterparts, at age of 9. Boys, on the other hand, are not legally considered to have reached the maturity that would make them responsible for their actions, such as murder, until the age of 15.

Human Rights Watch and Amnesty International say Iran executes the most juvenile offenders of any country, in breach of the UN Convention, which forbids the death penalty for crimes committed under the age of 18. Lawyers estimate 130 prisoners are on death row in Iran for murders committed as minors.

== Execution ==
The head of the judiciary officially granted a two-month stay of execution, yet the go-ahead for her execution was given to Rasht prison authorities. Delara Darabi was executed at 5:00 AM local time on 1 May 2009 at Rasht Central Prison, without prior notification to her attorney and family. Just minutes before being hanged she was allowed to make a desperate last phone call to her parents, and she pleaded for them to save her, followed by the prison warden's voice informing her parents she was to be executed for her crimes immediately.

== Reactions ==
Her execution was met with international outcry. Iran Human Rights Director, Mahmood Amiry-Moghaddam said: "Iranian leadership and judiciary must be held responsible for execution of Delara Darabi" said Mahmood Amiry-Moghaddam spokesperson of the site Iran Human Rights. "Lack of strong and sustainable reactions from the world community is one of the main reasons why Iranian authorities continue execution of minors. Iranian authorities have learned that their violations of the human rights lead just to some verbal protests from the world community, without any practical consequences. It is time that the UN and world community show that UN’s conventions are more than just formalities." Mahmood Amiry-Moghaddam asked UN and EU to condemn Delara’s execution and put sanctions on the Iranian authorities."

== See also ==
- Iran Human Rights
- Stop Child Executions Campaign
- Zahra Bani Yaghoub
- Reza Alinejad
- Nazanin Fatehi
- Mosleh Zamani
- Human rights in Iran
- Atefeh Sahaaleh
