= Alinejad =

Alinejad (Persian: علی‌نژاد) is a Persian surname that may refer to

- Masih Alinejad (born 1976), Iranian journalist and writer
- Mohammad Alinejad (born 1993), Iranian football forward
- Reza Alinejad (born 1985), alleged Iranian juvenile offender
