= Miss Slovenia =

Beauty pageant

Miss Slovenije
- Formation: 1990
- Type: Beauty pageant
- Headquarters: Ljubljana
- Location: Slovenia
- Members: Miss World
- Official language: Slovene
- Website: Official website

The Miss Slovenia (Slovene: Miss Slovenije) is a national Beauty pageant in Slovenia. Miss Slovenia is not related to the previous Miss Universe Slovenia.

== History ==
Vesna Musić was crowned the first Miss Slovenia in 1990. In 1992, Slovenia began to participate in the Miss World pageant, Nataša Abram, Miss Slovenia 1992, was the first Miss Slovenia presented at Miss World Pageant.

== Titleholders ==
Color key

- Declared as Winner
- Ended as runner-up
- Ended as one of the finalists or semifinalists

The winner of Miss Slovenije represents her country at Miss World. On occasion, when the winner does not qualify (due to age) for either contest, a runner-up is sent.

Year	Miss World Slovenia	Municipality	Placement	Special Awards
2027	Elin Kos	Gorenja Vas–Poljane	TBA	
2026	Amadea Zupan	Sežana	Unplaced	
2025	Alida Tomanič	Ptuj	Unplaced	
2024	No competition held			
2023	Vida Milivojša	Ljubljana	Unplaced	
2022	Miss World 2021 was rescheduled to 16 March 2022 due to the COVID-19 pandemic outbreak in Puerto Rico, no edition started in 2022			
2021	Maja Čolic	Ribnica	Unplaced	Top 27 at Miss World Talent; Top 32 at Miss World Sport
2020	Due to the impact of COVID-19 pandemic, no pageant in 2020			
2019	Špela Alič	Ljubljana	Unplaced	
2018	Lara Kalanj	Ljubljana	Unplaced	Top 24 at Miss World Sport
2017	Maja Zupan	Kranj	Unplaced	Top 30 at Miss World Top Model
2016	Maja Taradi	Ljubljana	Unplaced	Top 21 at Miss World Talent
2015	Mateja Kociper	Maribor	Unplaced	
2014	Julija Bizjak	Lesce	Unplaced	
2013	Maja Cotič	Nova Gorica	Unplaced	
2012	Nives Orešnik	Maribor	Unplaced	Top 24 at Miss World Sport
2011	Lana Mahnič Jekoš	Grosuplje	Unplaced	Top 77 at Beauty with a Purpose
2010	Sandra Adam	Dravograd	Did not compete	
2009	Tina Petelin	Maribor	Unplaced	
2007	Tadeja Ternar	Beltinci	Unplaced	
2006	Iris Mulej	Ilirska Bistrica	Unplaced	Top 25 at Miss World Beach Beauty
2005	Sanja Grohar	Kranj	Unplaced	Top 19 at Miss World Beach Beauty, Top 16 at Miss World Talent, 2nd Runner Up at Miss World Sport
2004	Živa Vadnov	Brezovica	Unplaced	
2003	Tina Zajc	Celje	Unplaced	
2002	Nataša Krajnc	Celje	Unplaced	
2001	Rebeka Dremelj	Brežice	Unplaced	
2000	Maša Merc	Maribor	Unplaced	
1999	Neda Gačnik	Ljubljana	Unplaced	
1998	Miša Novak	Ptuj	Unplaced	
1997	Maja Šimec	Novo Mesto	Unplaced	
1996	Alenka Vindiš	Šmarje pri Jelšah	Unplaced	
1995	Teja Boškin	Ljubljana	Unplaced	
1994	Janja Zupan	Ljubljana	Unplaced	
1993	Metka Albreht	Postojna	Unplaced	
1992	Nataša Abram	Koper	Unplaced	
1991	Teja Skarza	Ljubljana	Did not compete	
1990	Vesna Musić	Velenje / Beograd	Did not compete	

== Winner by Municipalities ==
Municipality	Titles	Years
Ljubljana	8	1991, 1994, 1995, 1999, 2016, 2018, 2019, 2022
Maribor	4	2000, 2009, 2012, 2015
Celje	2	2002, 2003
Nova Gorica	1	2013
Grosuplje	1	2011
Dravograd	1	2010
Beltinci	1	2007
Ilirska Bistrica	1	2006
Kranj	1	2005
Brežice	1	2001
Ptuj	1	1998
Novo Mesto	1	1997
Šmarje pri Jelšah	1	1996
Postojna	1	1993
Koper	1	1992
Velenje	1	1990

=== By Geographical regions ===
As of 2011:

Region	Titles
Osrednjeslovenska	5 title(s) won by Ljubljana(4), Grosuplje(1)
Savinjska	4 title(s) won by Celje(2), Šmarje pri Jelšah(1)), Velenje(1)
Podravska	3 title(s) won by Maribor(2), Ptuj(1)
Notranjsko-kraška	2 title(s) won by Ilirska Bistrica(1), Postojna(1)
Koroška	1 title(s) won by Dravograd
Pomurska	1 title(s) won by Beltinci
Gorenjska	1 title(s) won by Kranj
Spodnjeposavska	1 title(s) won by Brežice
Jugovzhodna Slovenija	1 title(s) won by Novo Mesto
Obalno-kraška	1 title(s) won by Koper
Goriška	1 title(s)won by Nova Gorica
Zasavska	0 title(s)
