= Mosleh Zamani =

Mosleh Zamani (Persian: مصلح زمانی, also referred to as Moslah Zamani) was a 23-year-old Iranian Kurd who was executed on December 17, 2009, for having an "illicit relationship with his girlfriend" when he was 17 years old.

According to Amnesty International, Zamani was convicted for abducting a woman several years older than he was (with whom he had previously had a consensual relationship) and of raping her. Amnesty International also stated that Zamani might not have had legal representation in court.

Zamani's case was considered controversial because of the nature of his crime and the fact that he was a minor at the time it took place. The Iranian government consequently signed the International Covenant on Civil and Political Rights and the Convention on the Rights of the Child; which led to the abolition of death sentence to minors in Iran.

== See also ==
- Human rights in Iran
- Delara Darabi
- Reza Alinejad
- Atefeh Rajabi
