= Orešnik =

Orešnik is a Slovene-language surname. Notable people with the surname include:

- Janez Orešnik (1935–2024), Slovene linguist
- Nives Orešnik (born 1992), Slovene model

== See also ==
- Resnik (surname)
