= Stop Child Executions Campaign =

Non-profit organization in Iran

Stop Child Executions
- Abbreviation: SCE
- Type: Non-governmental organization
- Purpose: Ending child execution in Iran
- Website: https://www.stopchildexecutions.com/

Stop Child Executions was a non-profit organization co-founded by Nazanin Afshin-Jam and David Etebari, that aims to put an end to executions of minors in Iran. The organization campaigned to raise awareness about the issue and to put pressure on the government of the Islamic Republic of Iran, both in Iran and internationally. SCE was a follow-up effort to the successful campaign and petition that helped save the life of Nazanin Fatehi, an Iranian teenager sentenced to death for killing her attempted rapist. The "Save Nazanin" petition garnered more than 350,000 signatures worldwide. Fatehi was released from prison in 2007.

SCE was a member of the Geneva Summit for Human Rights and Democracy.

== Background information ==
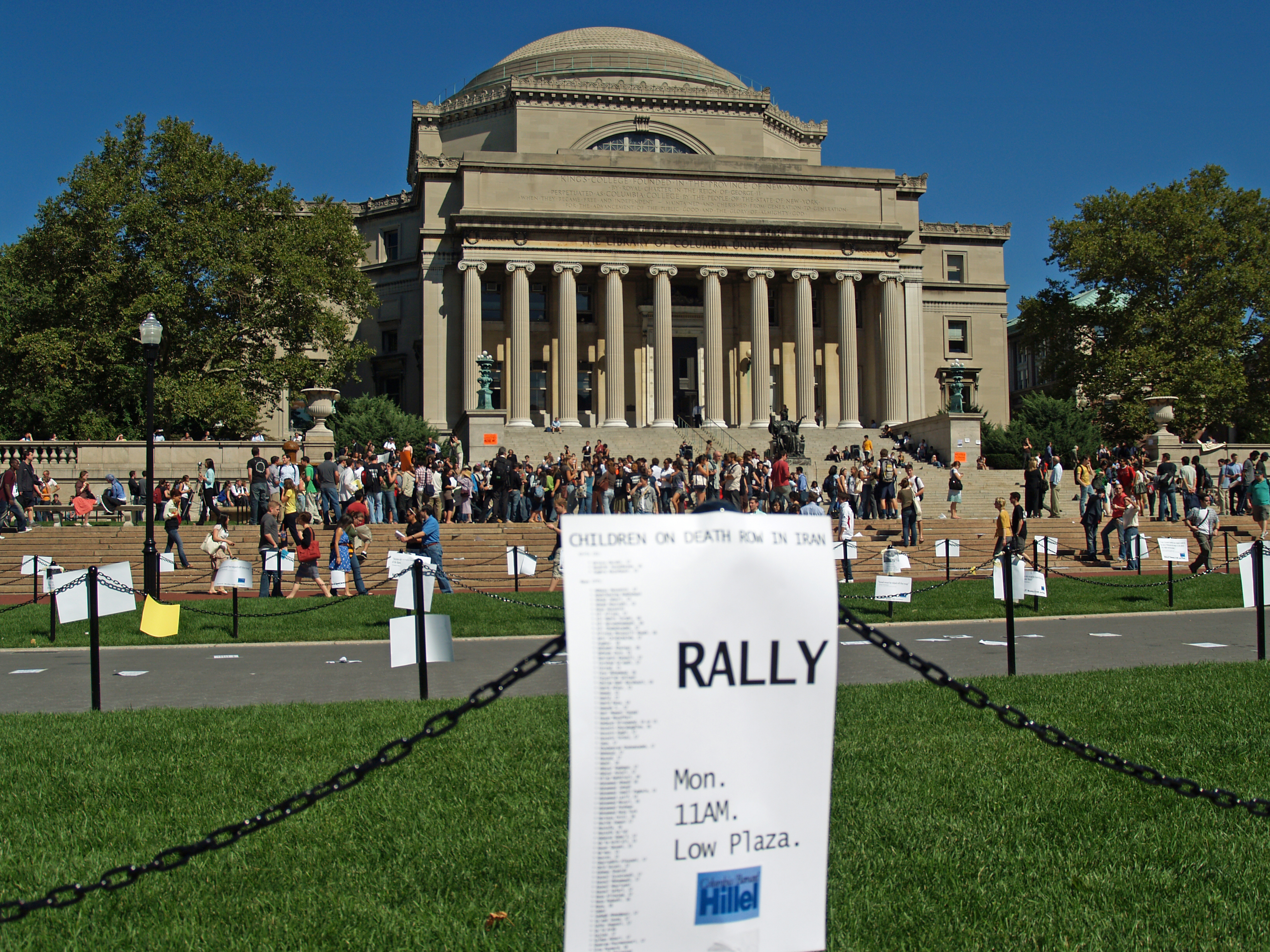
When Iranian President Mahmoud Ahmadinejad spoke at Columbia University a sign on campus noted a rally against child executions in Iran.

As a state party to the International Covenant on Civil and Political Rights (ICCPR) and the Convention on the Rights of the Child (CRC), the government of Iran agreed not to execute anyone for an offense committed when they were under the age of 18. Article 6 paragraph 5 of the International Covenant on Civil and Political Rights (ICCPR) declares: “Sentence of death shall not be imposed for crimes committed by persons below eighteen years of age” and article 37 paragraph 1 of the Convention on the Rights of the Child (CRC) provides that: “Neither capital punishment nor life imprisonment without possibility of release shall be imposed for offenses committed by persons below eighteen years of age”. Upon ratification of the CRC, however, Iran made the following reservation: "If the text of the Convention is or becomes incompatible with the domestic laws and Islamic standards at any time or in any case, the Government of the Islamic Republic shall not abide by it."

In January 2005, the UN Committee on the Rights of the Child, which monitors states' compliance with the CRC, urged Iran to immediately stay all executions of child offenders and to abolish the use of the death penalty in such cases. In the summer of 2006, the Iranian Parliament reportedly passed a bill establishing special courts for children and adolescents. However, it had not been approved by the Council of Guardians, which supervises Iran's legislation to ensure conformity with Islamic principles. As Iran continued to execute juvenile offenders, international human rights organizations and foreign governments routinely denounced the executions as a violation of the treaty.

Stop Child Executions was founded in 2007. In October 2008 SCE issued a comprehensive list of solutions to end juvenile executions in Iran. In June 2009, SCE issued a report on child executions in Iran. Since 1990 at least 34 executions of juvenile offenders in Iran had been recorded (26 since 2005). As of October 2008 SCE had recorded at least 140 juvenile offenders on death row in Iran, 3 in Saudi Arabia, 3 in Sudan and 1 in Yemen. As of October 2008, 6 juveniles were reported to have been executed in Iran to date in 2008.

== See also ==
- Delara Darabi
- Atefeh Sahaaleh
