= Lauranza Doliman =

Guadeloupean model and beauty queen (born 1980)

Lauranza Doliman (born c. 1980) is a Guadeloupean Beauty Queen, Business Woman, Model and Beauty pageant titleholder. She was the first contestant of her island to have competed in Miss World. After winning Miss Guadeloupe World 2003, she competed in Miss World 2003 in China, winning the Miss World Elegance award. She also won the title of Miss Tourism Universe 2003.

Preceded by Do	Miss World Guadeloupe; 2003	Succeeded by Jenifer Desbouiges
