= Abdolsamad Khorramshahi =

Iranian lawyer

Abolsamad Khorramshahi (Persian: عبدالصمد خرمشاهی) is an Iranian lawyer.

Khorramshahi was involved in several controversial cases including detained British embassy political analyst Hossein Rassam who was arrested after Iran's disputed presidential election in 2009. He also represented Roxana Saberi, an Iranian-American journalist who was arrested on charges of espionage by the Iranian government, but was later released. Other cases in which Khorramshahi was involved include Delara Darabi and Shahla Jahed.

== See also ==
- Shirin Ebadi
