= Ami Vashi =

Indian model

- Born: Los Angeles, CA
- Education: University of Southern California
- Occupations: Model, dancer and beauty pageant titleholder
- Beauty pageant titleholder
- Title: Femina Miss India 2003

Ami Vashi is an Indian model, dancer and beauty pageant titleholder. She won the Femina Miss India title in 2003 and represented India in the Miss World 2003 competition where she was placed fourth out of five finalists.

== Family ==
Her father is Jay Prakash and her mother is Bhadra Vashi.

== Personal information ==
Vashi grew up in Los Angeles. She currently divides her time between Pasadena in California and Mumbai. She is a graduate of the University of Southern California.

== Career ==
In addition to her fashion-related work, Vashi practices Indian classical dance and yoga and is involved in various community service initiatives in the Los Angeles area and in India.

Awards and achievements
| Preceded by Shruti Sharma | Femina Miss India World; 2003 | Succeeded by Sayali Bhagat |
