= Rosanna Davison =

Irish model, activist, and Miss World 2003

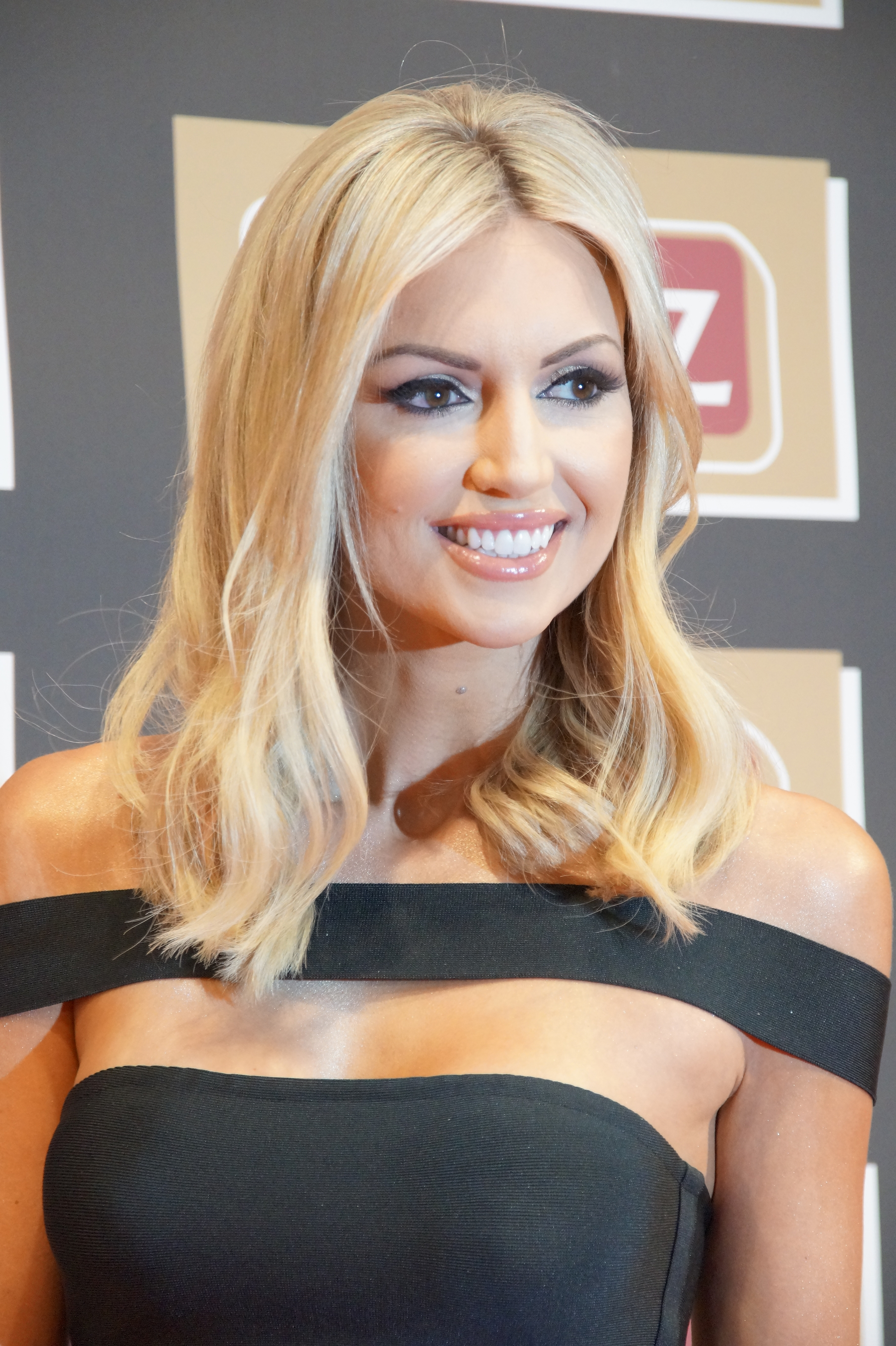
- Davison in 2016
- Born: Rosanna Diane Davison; 17 April 1984 (age 42); Dublin, Ireland
- Height: 1.78 m (5 ft 10 in)
- Beauty pageant titleholder
- Title: Miss Ireland 2003 (Winner); Miss World 2003 (Winner); Miss World Europe 2003
- Hair colour: Blonde
- Eye colour: Hazel brown
- Spouse: Wesley Quirke (m. 2014)
- Children: 3
- Parent(s): Chris de Burgh; Diane Davison

Rosanna Diane Davison (born 17 April 1984) is an Irish actress, singer, writer, model and beauty queen who was crowned Miss World 2003. She is the daughter of musician Chris de Burgh, and the song "For Rosanna" was written by her father for his eighth studio album, Into the Light (1986) in her honour. Davison is a qualified nutritional therapist and promotes the health benefits of a plant-based diet.

She is currently the only Irish woman to win the Miss World title, and scored its first win in Miss World history, after Siobhan McClafertty placed 1st Runner-Up in 1990.

== Career ==
In August 2003, she entered the Miss Ireland finals in Dublin, and winning the competition, found herself competing for the title of Miss World. December 2003 saw Davison, along with 106 other contestants, compete in the Miss World competition in Sanya, China. Rosanna went on to win the crown and is the first Irish entrant to win the Miss World title since it started in 1951, her runners-up are Nazanin Afshin-Jam from Canada (first runner-up) and Guan Qi from China (second runner-up). During Davison's reign, she visited the United Kingdom, the United States, Canada, China, and Sri Lanka.

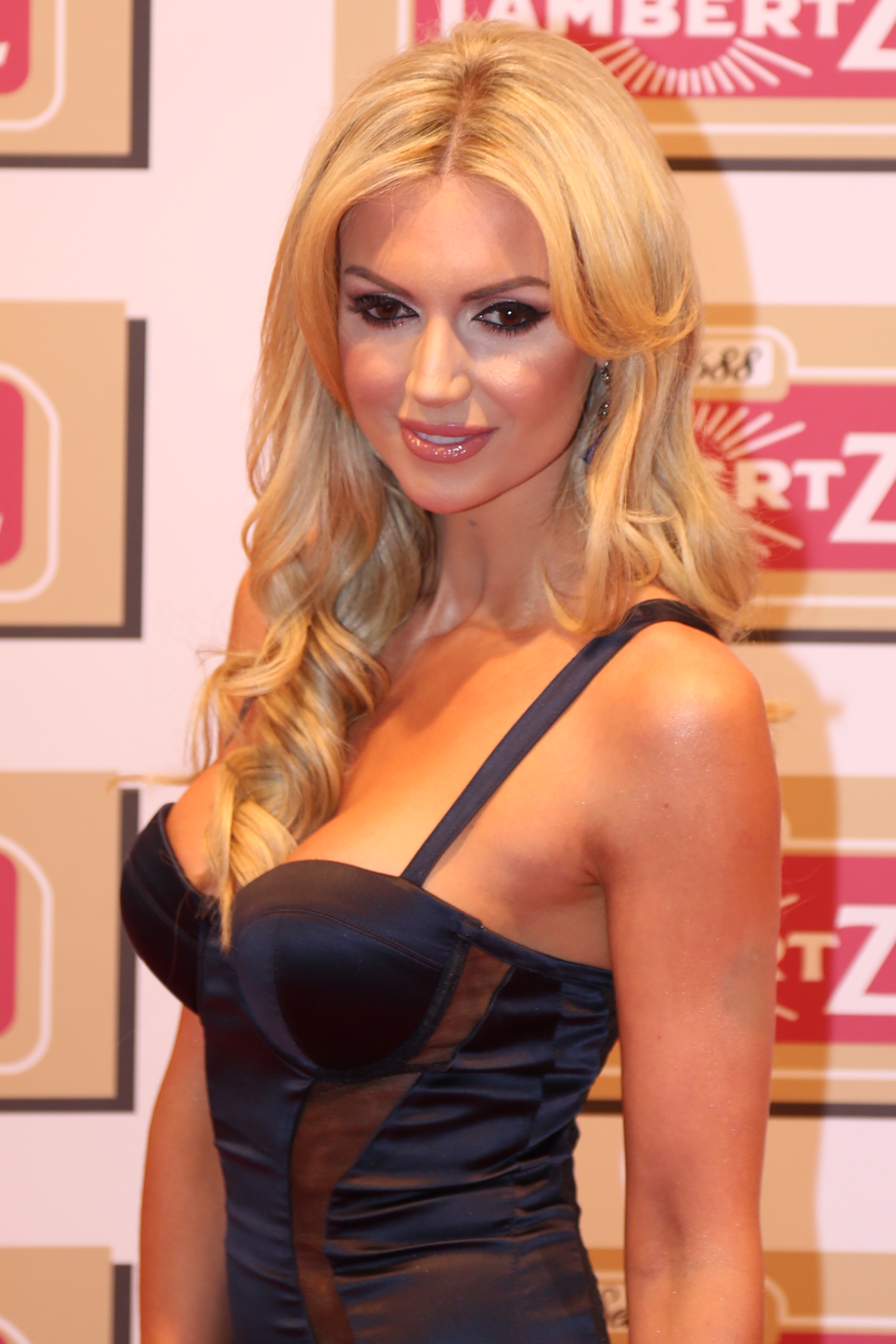
Rosanna Davison in 2017

In February 2012, she came second in a poll to find Ireland's most desirable Valentines. In the same year, she appeared on the October German issue of Playboy magazine.

From October 2013, she started presenting slots on LFC TV, the dedicated television channel for Liverpool F.C.

In December 2023, Davison was announced as one of the eleven celebrities taking part in the seventh season of Dancing with the Stars.

== Personal life ==
Born in County Dublin, Ireland, Davison's primary school education was at Aravon School, in County Wicklow. She then attended Rathdown School in Glenageary, County Dublin. She was class prefect before graduating and completing her leaving certificate examinations in 2002.

Davison has been in a relationship with Wesley Quirke since 2006. They were engaged in 2013 and wed in the summer of 2014. They had their honeymoon in the Seychelles. They have one daughter, and twin sons.

Davison is a graduate of the College of Naturopathic Medicine. She is a qualified nutritional therapist and obtained her MSc degree in personalised nutrition from Middlesex University. In February 2015 she signed a publishing deal with Gill Books for her first cookbook, Eat Yourself Beautiful, which was released in August 2015 and went on to be a best-seller. The book advocates plant-based nutrition.

Davison has previously collaborated with People for the Ethical Treatment of Animals (PETA) on multiple occasions to promote the benefits of vegetarian and vegan diets. In 2019, Davison was criticised by vegan activists for taking part in a paid campaign for Naas Racecourse. In response, Davison stated that although she eats a plant-based diet for both health and ethical reasons, she has never claimed to be a "lifestyle vegan".

== Filmography ==
- Harry Hill: An Audience with Harry Hill (2004)
- Comic Relief: Red Nose Night Live 05 (2005)
- Miss Great Britain Final 2010 (2011)
- Ringsend (2017)
- The Wake (2017)

== Selected publications ==
- Eat Yourself Beautiful: True Beauty, From the Inside Out (2015)
- Eat Yourself Fit: Make Your Workout Work Harder (2016)

Awards and achievements
Preceded by (Turkey) Azra Akın	Miss World; 2003	Succeeded by (Peru) María Julia Mantilla
Preceded by Lynda Duffy	Miss Ireland; 2003	Succeeded by Natasha Nic Gairbheith
Preceded by none	Miss World Beach Beauty; 2003	Succeeded by (United States) Nancy Randall
