= Bill Baird (activist) =

American activist (born 1932)

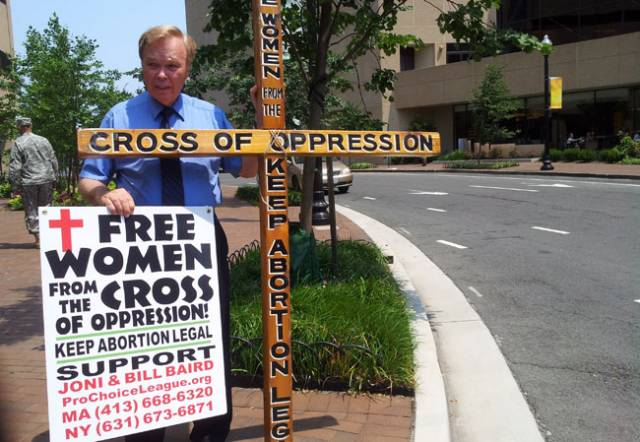
- Baird picketing National Right to Life Convention in June 2012
- Born: June 20, 1932 (age 93); Brooklyn, New York
- Occupations: Reproductive rights advocate, speaker, social reformer
- Awards: Humanist Pioneer Award

Bill Baird (born June 20, 1932) is a reproductive rights pioneer, called by some media the "father" of the birth control and abortion-rights movement. He was jailed eight times in five states in the 1960s for lecturing on abortion and birth control. Baird is believed to be the first and only non-lawyer in American history with three Supreme Court victories.

In 1967, hundreds of students at Boston University petitioned Baird to challenge a Massachusetts law that prohibited providing contraception to unmarried persons. On April 6, 1967, he gave a lecture at Boston University, during which he gave a condom and a package of over-the-counter contraceptive foam to a female college student. He was immediately arrested and eventually jailed. His appeal of his conviction culminated in the 1972 Supreme Court decision Eisenstadt v. Baird, which established the right of unmarried persons to possess contraception on the same basis as married couples. U.S. Supreme Court Justice William J. Brennan, Jr. wrote in that decision: "If the right of privacy means anything, it is the right of the individual to be free from unwarranted governmental intrusion into matters so fundamentally affecting a person as to whether to bear or beget a child." Eisenstadt v. Baird has been described as "among the most influential in the United States during the entire century by any manner or means of measurement".

== Early life ==
Baird grew up in Brooklyn, and was raised a strict Lutheran.

== Birth control rights activism ==
Bill Baird's advocacy for reproductive rights began in 1963 after witnessing the death of an unmarried mother of nine children who died of a self-inflicted coat hanger abortion. As the clinical director of EMKO, a birth control manufacturer, he had been coordinating research at Harlem Hospital when she stumbled into the corridor, covered with blood from the waist down.

In 1963, he began giving away EMKO birth control foam samples including at malls where his activities often met with religious opposition. He was threatened with arrest for distributing free birth control foam in Hempstead, New York. Baird founded the Parents Aid Society and later distributed contraceptives in a converted delivery truck that he called the "Plan Van." In 1966 Baird established the first birth control club on a college campus at Hofstra University.

He was sent to jail for teaching birth control and distributing abortion literature in New York, New Jersey, and Wisconsin. Baird's punishment galvanized feminists like Anne Koedt to speak out in his defense. On May 13, 1965, he challenged New York's anti-birth control statute, law 1142. He was arrested in Hempstead, NY and jailed for teaching birth control out of his mobile "Plan Van." Baird's challenges led to the legalization of birth control in New York. Planned Parenthood President Alan Guttmacher criticized Baird and stated that Baird was "overenthusiastic and every couple seeking birth control information should seek a physician."

In 1966, Baird challenged New Jersey's restrictive birth control statute after the commissioner of welfare threatened to jail unwed mothers under the law of fornication. When Baird arrived in Freehold, New Jersey in his "Plan Van" to challenge the law, he was arrested and jailed for publicly displaying contraceptive devices.

Baird challenged restrictive birth control laws in the state of Wisconsin in 1969 and was again arrested and jailed for showing "birth control and indecent articles" to a Northland College audience in Ashland.

=== Eisenstadt v. Baird ===
In 1967 Boston University students petitioned Baird to challenge Massachusetts's stringent "Crimes Against Chastity, Decency, Morality and Good Order" law (i.e. Chapter 272, section 21A). On April 6, 1967 he gave a speech to 1,500 students and others at Boston University on abortion, birth control, environmental pollution, and overpopulation. He gave a female student one condom and a package of contraceptive foam. Police arrested him as a felon and he faced up to ten years in jail. He was convicted and sentenced to three months in Boston's Charles Street Jail.

He fought to legalize birth control without the support of major abortion rights or feminist organizations, several of which attacked him. Betty Friedan of the National Abortion Rights Action League (NARAL) has implied many times since 1971 that Baird was a "CIA agent", including a statement in The New York Times. During his challenge to the Massachusetts law, Planned Parenthood stated that "there is nothing to be gained by court action of this kind. The only way to remove the limitations remaining in the law is through the legislative process."

Despite this opposition, Baird fought for five years until Eisenstadt v. Baird legalized birth control for all Americans on March 22, 1972. Eisenstadt v. Baird, a landmark right to privacy decision, became the foundation for such cases as Roe v. Wade and the 2003 gay rights victory Lawrence v. Texas. Eisenstadt v. Baird is mentioned in over 52 Supreme Court cases from 1972 through 2002. Each of the eleven U.S. Court of Appeals Circuits, as well as the Federal Circuit, has cited Eisenstadt v. Baird as authority. The highest courts of all 50 states, the District of Columbia, and Puerto Rico have cited Eisenstadt v. Baird.

== Abortion rights activism ==
Reporter Georgie Anne Geyer called Baird "father of abortion rights", a label that has oft been repeated for decades in the media. Baird established the nation's first abortion referral center in 1963 in Hempstead, New York.

In 1967 Baird facilitated the first abortion slush fund on a college campus.

A Washington Post article on Baird's clinic, with a waiting room packed with women from across the nation, reported, "It was 3 a.m. before the last patient saw Baird . . . Nowhere is such help available in the U.S." Baird risked a 10-year jail term for each of the thousands of women he helped to get abortions. Others provided abortion information anonymously through the mail; however, Baird was thoroughly out in the open doing so.

Baird continued fighting for reproductive freedom and directed three non-profit clinics that are now closed due to constant opposition. In 1979, his Hempstead clinic was firebombed by anti-abortion terrorist Peter Burkin. All escaped due to Baird's training drills with his employees that prepared them for such a violent attack. Burkin was given a very light sentence, two years in a mental hospital. With his clinic under constant threat, Baird wrote and distributed the nation's first clinic self-defense manual to combat terrorism.

=== Bellotti v. Baird ===
Baird has two other U.S. Supreme Court victories, Baird v. Bellotti I (1976) and Baird v. Bellotti II (1979), which gave minors the right to abortion without parental consent.

== Pro Choice League ==
Baird is the founder and co-director, along with his wife Joni Baird, of the Pro Choice League. In 2002, the Bairds and Fr. Frank Pavone, co-founder and director of Priests for Life, issued a statement calling for an end to anti-abortion inflammatory rhetoric and violence.

== Education ==
Baird earned his B.S. from Brooklyn College in 1955.

== Appearances ==
Baird is a frequent public speaker, lecturing at universities, civic and professional organizations, as well as conferences on women, feminism, politics, free speech, and reproductive rights.

== Books ==
In 2012 Joni Baird finished Bill Baird's biography after nearly thirteen years of research and writing. She is still seeking an interested literary agent to help get Bill Baird's biography published.

== Awards and recognition ==
- Life Time Achievement Award, Brooklyn College Alumni, 2004.
- The NARAL Courage Award 2000, Oklahoma affiliate of the National Abortion and Reproductive Rights Action League, 2000.
- Certificate of Appreciation, Legal Association of Women at Brooklyn Law School, 1999. "For his many contributions and valiant efforts in the Public Interest".
- Bill Baird Eternal Vigilance Award, Brown University American Civil Liberties Union, 1998.
- Reproductive Rights Pioneer, National Organization for Women—New York State, 1997.
- Distinguished Alumnus Award, Faculty of Brooklyn College of CUNY, 1997.
- Certificate of Distinction, National Organization for Women, 1989. "For outstanding leadership for women's rights".
- Man of the Year, The Nebraska Coalition for Women, 1989. "A Pioneer and an Activist in the fight for Reproductive Freedom".
- National Abortion Rights Action League, Ohio, 1987. "For His Unwavering Commitment to Reproductive Freedom For All Women".
- Freedom of Speech Award, American Atheists, 1985. "For his continuing efforts to disseminate birth control information".
- National Abortion Rights Action League of Pa., "For promoting reproductive freedom and civil rights".
- Patriot Award, State of Massachusetts, 1998
