= Eisenstadt v. Baird =

1972 U.S. Supreme Court case

- Supreme Court of the United States

Argued November 17–18, 1971 Decided March 22, 1972
- Full case name: Thomas S. Eisenstadt, Sheriff of Suffolk County, Massachusetts, Appellant v. William F. Baird, Appellee.
- Citations: 405 U.S. 438 (more) 92 S. Ct. 1029; 31 L. Ed. 2d 349; 1972 U.S. LEXIS 145

Case history
- Prior: Conviction affirmed in part and reversed in part, Commonwealth v. Baird, 355 Mass. 746, 247 N.E.2d 574 (1969); Habeas corpus petition dismissed, Baird v. Eisenstadt, 310 F. Supp. 951 (D. Mass. 1970); reversed, 429 F.2d 1398 (1st Cir. 1970).
- Subsequent: None

Holding
- A Massachusetts law criminalizing the distribution of contraceptives to unmarried persons for the purpose of preventing pregnancy violated the right to equal protection. Judgment of the Court of Appeals for the First Circuit affirmed.

Court membership
- Chief Justice Warren E. Burger Associate Justices William O. Douglas · William J. Brennan Jr. Potter Stewart · Byron White; Thurgood Marshall · Harry Blackmun; Lewis F. Powell Jr. · William Rehnquist

Case opinions
- Majority: Brennan, joined by Douglas, Stewart, Marshall
- Concurrence: Douglas
- Concurrence: White (in result), joined by Blackmun
- Dissent: Burger
- Powell and Rehnquist took no part in the consideration or decision of the case.

Laws applied
- U.S. Const. amends. IX, XIV

Eisenstadt v. Baird, 405 U.S. 438 (1972), is a landmark decision of the U.S. Supreme Court that established the right of unmarried people to possess contraception on the same basis as married couples.

The Court struck down a Massachusetts law prohibiting the distribution of contraceptives to unmarried people for the purpose of preventing pregnancy, ruling that it violated the Equal Protection Clause of the U.S. Constitution. The decision effectively legalized (heterosexual) premarital sex in the United States.

== Background ==
William Baird was charged with a felony for distributing contraceptive foams after lectures on birth control and population control at Boston University. The prearranged violation of the law occurred on April 6, 1967, when Baird handed a condom and a package of contraceptive foam to a 19-year-old woman. Under Massachusetts law on "crimes against chastity" (Chapter 272, section 21A), contraceptives could be distributed only by registered doctors or pharmacists, and only to married persons.

After Baird was convicted, an appeal resulted in partial overturn by the Massachusetts Supreme Judicial Court, which concluded that the lectures were covered by First Amendment protections. However, the court affirmed the conviction under contraceptive distribution laws. Baird filed a petition for a federal writ of habeas corpus, which was refused by the federal district court. Upon appeal, The Court of Appeals for the First Circuit vacated the dismissal and remanded the action with directions to grant the writ, and dismiss the charge, reasoning that the Massachusetts law infringed on fundamental human rights of unmarried couples as guaranteed by the Due Process Clause of the Fourteenth Amendment. This ruling was then appealed to the United States Supreme Court, by Sheriff Thomas S. Eisenstadt, who had prosecuted the case, on the ground that Baird lacked standing to appeal, being neither an authorized distributor under the statute nor a single person.

== Supreme Court decision ==
In a 6–1 decision (Justices Rehnquist and Powell were sworn in too late to participate in the case), the Court upheld both Baird's standing to appeal and the First Circuit's decision on the basis of the Equal Protection Clause, but did not reach the Due Process issues. The majority opinion was written by Justice William J. Brennan Jr. and joined by three other justices, William O. Douglas, Potter Stewart, and Thurgood Marshall. Brennan reasoned that, since Massachusetts did not (and perhaps could not under Griswold v. Connecticut) enforce its law against married couples, the law worked irrational discrimination by denying the right to possess contraceptives by unmarried couples. He found that Massachusetts's law was not designed to protect public health and lacked a rational basis.

Brennan, writing for the Court, made four principal observations:

1. Baird had standing to assert the rights of unmarried persons who wished to have access to contraceptives.
2. The Massachusetts law could not reasonably be held to advance the purpose of deterring fornication, since a) fornication was a misdemeanor in Massachusetts, and a state could not reasonably wish to punish a misdemeanor by forcing an unwanted child on the fornicator; b) the state could not reasonably wish to punish the distributor of contraceptives as a felon for aiding and abetting the misdemeanor of fornication; c) the law did not prohibit the distribution of contraceptives to unmarried persons for the purpose of preventing sexually transmitted diseases, and d) the law made no attempt to ensure that contraceptives legally obtained by a married person for the purpose of preventing pregnancy would not be used in an extramarital affair.
3. The Massachusetts law could not reasonably be held to promote health, as whatever health risks posed by contraceptives were just as great for married persons as unmarried persons.
4. The Massachusetts law could not be justified by the State's judgment that contraceptives are immoral per se, because the morality of contraceptives does not depend on the marital status of those who use it. It is possible that the Due Process right of privacy of married couples to use contraceptives recognized in Griswold v. Connecticut means that married couples have the right to have contraceptives distributed to them; if so, then unmarried people have that same right. ("If the right of privacy means anything, it is the right of the individual, married or single, to be free from unwarranted governmental intrusion into matters so fundamentally affecting a person as the decision whether to bear or beget a child.") But even if Griswold does not imply a Due Process right of married couples to be distributed contraceptives, the Equal Protection Clause prevents states from using the immorality of contraception as a basis for denying to unmarried people the same access to contraceptives as married people.

Justice Douglas, concurring, argued that in addition to privacy rights, Baird was engaged in speech while distributing vaginal foam, and his arrest was therefore prohibited by the First Amendment.

Justice White, joined by Justice Blackmun, did not join Brennan's opinion but concurred in the judgment on narrower grounds. White and Blackmun declined to reach the issue of whether Massachusetts could limit distribution of contraceptives only to married couples. They argued that Massachusetts had asserted an implausible health rationale for limiting distribution of vaginal foam to licensed pharmacists or physicians.

Chief Justice Burger dissented alone, arguing that there were no conclusive findings available to the Court on the health risks of vaginal foam since that issue had not been presented to the lower courts, and thus no basis for the Court's finding that the Massachusetts statute served no public health interest. Burger also held that the Massachusetts statute independently advanced the state's interest in ensuring couples receive informed medical advice on contraceptives.

== Significance ==
Later cases have interpreted the ruling's most famous sentence—"If the right of privacy means anything, it is the right of the individual, married or single, to be free from unwarranted governmental intrusion into matters so fundamentally affecting a person as the decision whether to bear or beget a child."—as recognizing the right of single people to engage in sexual activity. Carey v. Population Services International, decided in 1977, struck down a New York law forbidding distribution of contraceptives to those under 16 but failed to produce a majority opinion and thus is not widely cited. Bowers v. Hardwick in 1986 rejected the claim of homosexuals to a fundamental right to engage in sodomy. In dissent, John Paul Stevens argued that Eisenstadt (and Carey) protected premarital heterosexual relations, and that the state had no rationale for distinguishing between heterosexuals and homosexuals. Lawrence v. Texas overruled Bowers in 2003, citing Eisenstadt in support of this ruling, and recognized that consenting adults had a right to engage in private, consensual non-commercial sexual intercourse.

Roy Lucas, a prominent abortion rights lawyer, assessed Eisenstadt as "among the most influential in the United States during the entire [20th] century by any manner or means of measurement." Eisenstadt v. Baird is mentioned in over 52 Supreme Court cases from 1972 through 2002. Each of the eleven U.S. Court of Appeals Circuit, as well as the Federal Circuit, has cited Eisenstadt v. Baird as authority. The highest courts of all 50 States, the District of Columbia, and Puerto Rico have cited Eisenstadt v. Baird.

== See also ==
- Bill Baird
- Birth control movement in the United States
- List of United States Supreme Court cases, volume 405
- Sex-related court cases
