= Hayat Ahmed =

Ethiopian model and beauty queen

- Born: 1982 (age 43–44)
- Occupation: Model

Hayat Ahmed Mohammed (born 1982) is an Ethiopian model and beauty pageant titleholder. Her name in Arabic means "life." Hayat Ahmed was Ethiopia's first representative to Miss World pageant. At the time of the competition, she was a third-year student at the Unity University College pursuing a course in Information Management Systems.

At Miss World 2003 pageant with 100 contestants, Hayat made the semi-finals and the title "Continental Queen of Beauty - Africa." The pageant took place in China and was seen by 1 billion people.

Hayat currently focuses her time on promoting condoms and bringing HIV/AIDS awareness to other parts of the country. This has sparked outrage and claims of hypocrisy as she is a Muslim woman promoting safe sex in Ethiopia, a very culturally conservative country, by using very western-style seductive advertisements for condoms on billboards.

== Recent activities ==
Hayat now runs Bellissima, a controversial condom café in Addis Ababa where all patrons are given condoms with the receipt. "Some Ethiopian people get shocked when they bring the bill with a condom, some saying we are promoting immorality," a waiter stated in 2008.

By 2010, Bellissima was well established, and still distributing free coffee-flavored condoms with the sponsorship of Marie Stopes International. The condoms are also available for sale under the name "Sensation" and are the least expensive condoms in the Ethiopian marketplace. However, resistance to Hayat's work continues both from Muslim authorities and from the Ethiopian Orthodox Church.

In 2008 Hayat Ahmed received aviation pilot training from Phoenix East Aviation Flight School. As of August 2024, Hayat is a Captain on the Boeing 777 and Boeing 787 Dreamliner at Ethiopian Airlines.

Preceded by Chinenye Akinlade	Miss World Africa; 2003	Succeeded by Anita Uwagbale
