= Tina Zajc =

Slovene model and beauty pageant titleholder

Tina Zajc (born 1983 in Ljubljana) is a Slovene model and beauty pageant titleholder who won Miss Slovenia 2003 and participated the Miss World 2003 competition but did not place. At the time, she was a 19-year-old geology student, studying earthquakes and volcanoes. She also had a modelling and acting career, and had recorded a song. As the winner of Miss Slovenia 2003, she won a Peugeot 206 car, a ring, a set of Samsonite suitcases, and an all-expense trip to the Miss World competition held in China in December 2003. She liked crime novels, horror films and comedy, and spoke English and German, and Croat.
