= Roxana Saberi =

American journalist (born 1977)

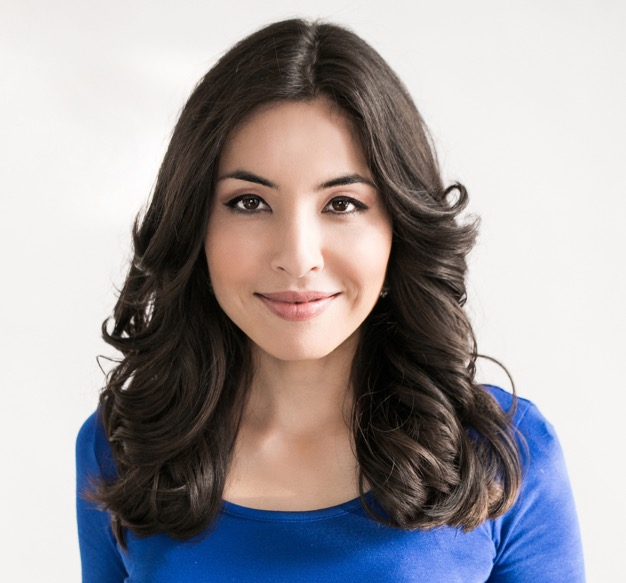
- Saberi in 2014
- Born: Roxana Saberi; April 26, 1977 (age 49); Belleville, New Jersey, United States
- Education: Concordia College (B.A.); Northwestern University (M.A.); Hughes Hall, Cambridge (M.A.)
- Occupations: Journalist, translator, author
- Notable credit(s): Miss North Dakota, 1997
- Parent(s): Mr. Reza Saberi (Iran); Ms. Akiko Saberi (Japan)
Association football career
- Height: 5 ft 5 in (1.65 m)
- Position: Midfielder
College career
Years	Team	Apps	(Gls)
1994–1996	Concordia Cobbers		(2)

Roxana Saberi (born April 26, 1977) is an American journalist who works as a correspondent for CBS News. In 2009, she was held prisoner in Iran's Evin Prison for 101 days under accusations of espionage. She subsequently wrote a book about the experience.

On April 8, 2009, the Iranian government charged Saberi with espionage, which she denied. She was subsequently convicted and sentenced to an eight-year prison term. An appeals court reduced the charge against her from espionage to possessing classified information, a charge which she also denied, and reduced her eight-year prison term to a two-year suspended sentence. She was released on May 11, 2009.

== Early life and education ==
Saberi was born in Belleville, New Jersey, the daughter of Iranian-born scholar Reza Saberi, and Akiko Saberi, who had emigrated from Japan. When she was six months old, her family moved to Fargo, North Dakota. Graduating with honors from Fargo North High School in 1994, Saberi played piano and soccer, and took part in Key Club and danceline. Saberi was inducted into the school's Hall of Fame in 2007.

She graduated in 1997 from Concordia College in Moorhead, Minnesota, with degrees in Communication and French. Saberi also played for the Cobbers soccer team from 1994 to 1996.

Chosen as Miss North Dakota in 1997, she was among the top ten finalists in Miss America 1998, winning the Scholar Award. Saberi holds a master's degree in broadcast journalism from Northwestern University and a second master's degree in international relations from the University of Cambridge, where she played for the university soccer team and the King's College soccer team. She was working on another master's degree in Iranian studies at the time of her arrest.

== Career ==
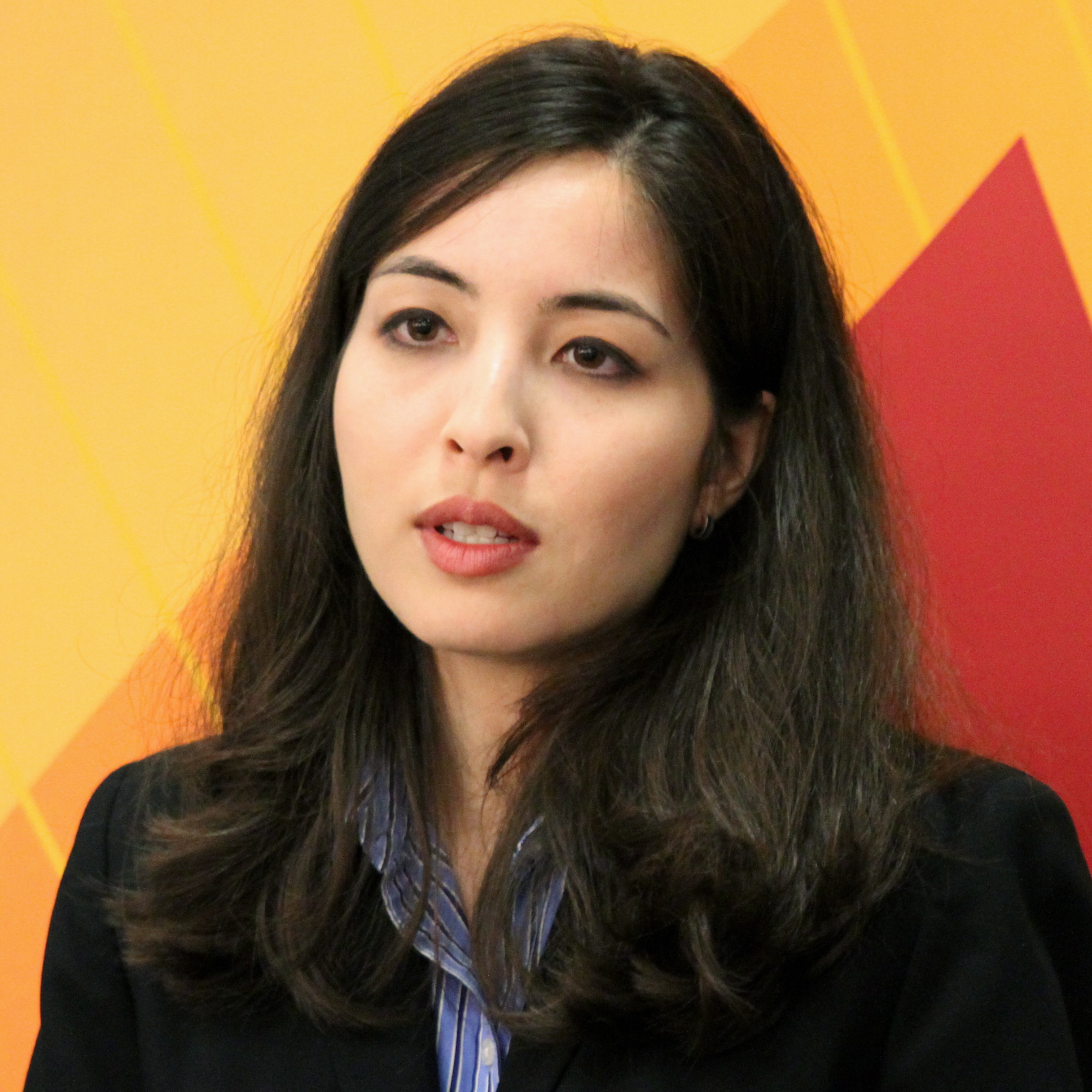

Saberi moved to Iran in 2003. US-based Feature Story News (FSN) distributed her reports to a wide range of broadcasters around the world, and Saberi's work soon became circulated to the viewers and listeners of Channel News Asia, South African Broadcasting, DW Radio, Vatican Radio, Radio New Zealand, Australian Independent Radio News, and others. She also made occasional contributions to PBS, NPR, and Fox News.

In 2006, the Iranian authorities revoked Saberi's press accreditation and closed the FSN bureau in Iran. She maintained a second press accreditation, permitting her to freelance in Iran for the BBC. In late 2006, it was also revoked. Following the revocation of her second press accreditation, Saberi cut ties with the BBC but continued to file occasional reports from the country for NPR, IPS and ABC Radio.

=== Iranian imprisonment ===
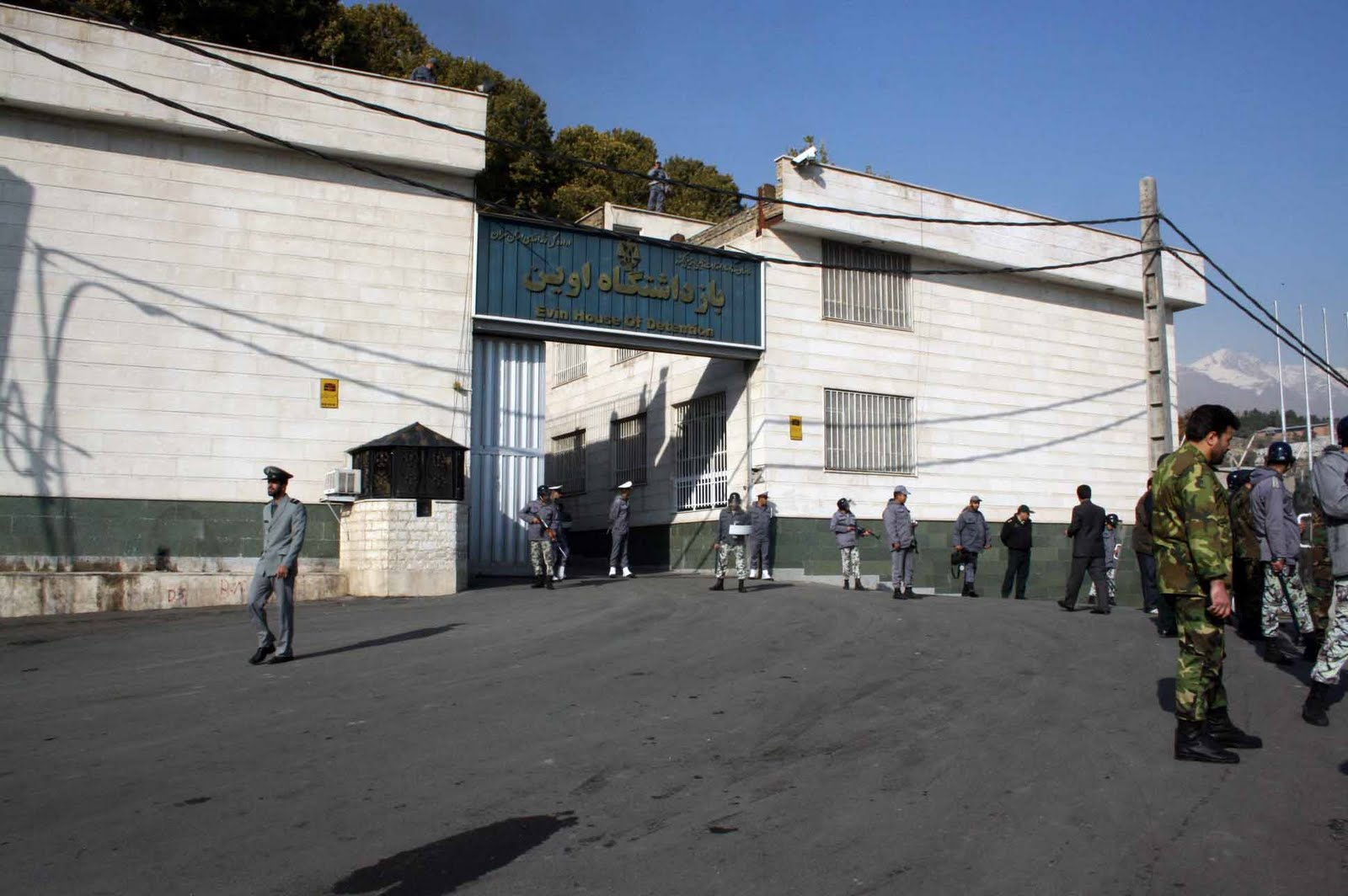
Evin House of Detention, where Saberi was held

Saberi was arrested on January 31, 2009. On March 3, 2009, an Iranian judiciary spokesman confirmed that Roxana Saberi had been arrested on the orders of the Islamic Revolutionary Court. Although Saberi holds both Iranian and American citizenship, Iran does not recognise dual citizenship.

On March 10, a number of international news organisations wrote an open letter to the Iranian government, calling on Iran to allow independent access to Saberi. Signatories included President of NPR Vivian Schiller, President of ABC News David Westin, Wall Street Journal Editor-in-Chief Robert Thomson, John Stack of Fox News, and Jon Williams (world editor at the BBC). The open letter expressed deep concern about Saberi's well-being and "the deprivation of her rights":

We now ask that one or more international organizations with responsibilities and rights under the Geneva Conventions be permitted access to Roxana immediately to ascertain her health and well-being and determine the conditions under which she is held. If no charges are filed, we now urge her immediate release and ask that she be given permission to return to her home country, the United States.

After more than five weeks of captivity, on March 8, Saberi was allowed to see an attorney for the first time. On March 18, marking 47 days of detention, the Saberi family called on Iran's supreme leader, Ayatollah Ali Khamenei, to intervene during the run-up to the Persian Nowruz holiday. The US administration expressed its concern at Saberi's detention, dismissing allegations against her as "baseless". US Secretary of State Hillary Clinton demanded her release. On April 6, her parents were allowed a 30-minute visit to Saberi in Evin Prison, where she was being held.

On April 8, the Iranian government charged Saberi with espionage, while the Iranian Students News Agency, quoting a hard-line judge who is the deputy head of Iran's prosecutor's office, said Saberi had "accepted" the accusation of espionage. Saberi's father, who was in Iran at the time but was not allowed into the courtroom, told NPR his daughter was coerced into making incriminating statements. "They told her if she made the statements, they would free her," he said. "It was a trick." The court sentenced her to eight years in prison, which her lawyer Abdolsamad Khorramshahi promised to appeal.

Switzerland represents United States interests in Iran, as Iran and the United States do not presently have diplomatic relations. US State Department spokesman Robert Wood questioned the transparency of Iran's Islamic Revolutionary Court judicial system, commenting that a Swiss representative was not allowed in the courtroom during Saberi's trial.

On April 19, 2009, President Mahmoud Ahmadinejad said that Saberi must have her legal right to defend herself. He wrote to the prosecutors: "Please, personally observe the process to ensure that the defendants are allowed all legal rights and freedom in defending themselves and that their rights are not violated even by one iota". It was reported on April 21 that Nobel Peace Prize laureate Shirin Ebadi's organization, Human Rights Defenders, would defend Saberi during her appeal. This appointment was never completed amid reports of objections by Iranian authorities. On April 21, 2009, Bahman Ghobadi, an Iranian film director, published a letter declaring Saberi's innocence and urging those who knew her to step in and defend her.

On April 25, 2009, the BBC reported that Saberi's father, Reza Saberi, said he had received word from his daughter that she had been on a hunger strike for the past five days. At the end of two weeks, she told him she had discontinued the hunger strike.

During this time, her situation was followed closely by Amnesty International, Human Rights Watch, the Asian American Journalists Association, Committee to Protect Journalists, Society of Professional Journalists, and UNITY: Journalists of Color, Inc. Amnesty International later named her a prisoner of conscience.

=== Release ===
On May 10, 2009, Saberi's appeal was heard by an Iranian appeals court. The court dismissed the charges against her because the US is not hostile. After all, it is not at war with Iran. Her original conviction was on the charges that she was working with a "hostile country" – the United States.

On May 11, 2009, Saberi was freed from prison after the appeals court suspended her eight-year jail sentence. An appeals court reduced the charge against her from espionage to possessing classified information, a charge Saberi denied, and reduced her eight-year prison term to a two-year suspended sentence.

After her release, Saberi said that although she was not physically tortured during her captivity, she was placed under "severe psychological and mental pressure". She said her captors blindfolded her during days of interrogation, held her in solitary confinement, and would not allow her to inform anyone of her whereabouts. According to Saberi, her interrogators threatened her with many years in prison and even execution if she did not confess to being a spy. She said that under these pressures, she had made a false confession, which she later recanted while still in custody.

After Saberi was released from prison, one of her lawyers declared that she had obtained a classified document while working as a translator for a powerful clerical lobby. He claimed that this had been used as evidence to convict her on espionage charges. He said the document was a classified Iranian report on the US-led war in Iraq.

Saberi later said, "I didn't have any classified documents. I had a research article that was public information, but my captors lied and claimed I had a classified document, evidently to pretend that my case was legitimate." Saberi has suggested that the lawyer may have been under pressure from the Iranian government to say after her release that the document was classified, even though in court he had argued that it was not.

Since her release, Saberi wrote a book about her experiences in Iran, Between Two Worlds: My Life and Captivity in Iran, which was released by HarperCollins on March 30, 2010. She has also been speaking out for Iran's "prisoners of conscience" as well as the Iranians who have been detained in the aftermath of the 2009 Iranian presidential election.

In 2013 Saberi was hired by Al Jazeera America as a correspondent and senior producer.

Saberi joined CBS News in January 2018 and is based in London.

== Awards and honors ==
Saberi's awards include the 2008 Medill Medal of Courage, the 2009 Ilaria Alpi Freedom of the Press Award, the 2009 NCAA Award of Valor, and a 2010 Project on Middle East Democracy Award.

== Published works ==
- Between Two Worlds: My Life and Captivity in Iran. Harper 2010, ISBN 978-0-06-196528-9

== See also ==
- Human rights in Iran
- Iran–United States relations
- List of foreign nationals detained in Iran
