= Sanja Grohar =

Slovenian model and singer (born 1984)

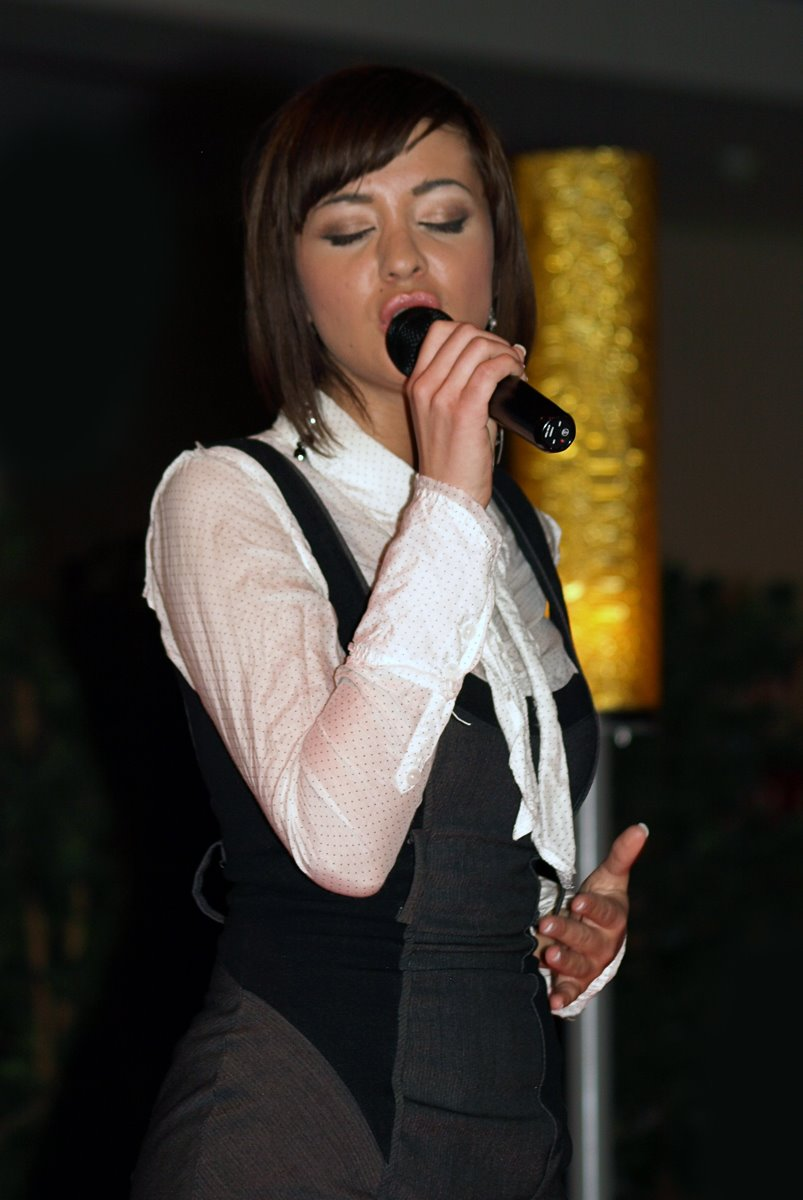
- Sanja Grohar in 2008
- Born: Sanja Grohar; 7 February 1984 (age 42); Kranj, Slovenia
- Occupation: Singer
- Known for: Miss Slovenia 2005
- Spouse: Matej Kovič (m. 2018)

Sanja Grohar born in Kranj) is a Slovenian singer, model, tv host, influencer and beauty pageant titleholder.

She won the Miss Slovenia competition in 2005 and attended Miss World 2005.She has released a number of singles since.
