= Miss World 2003 =

Beauty pageant edition

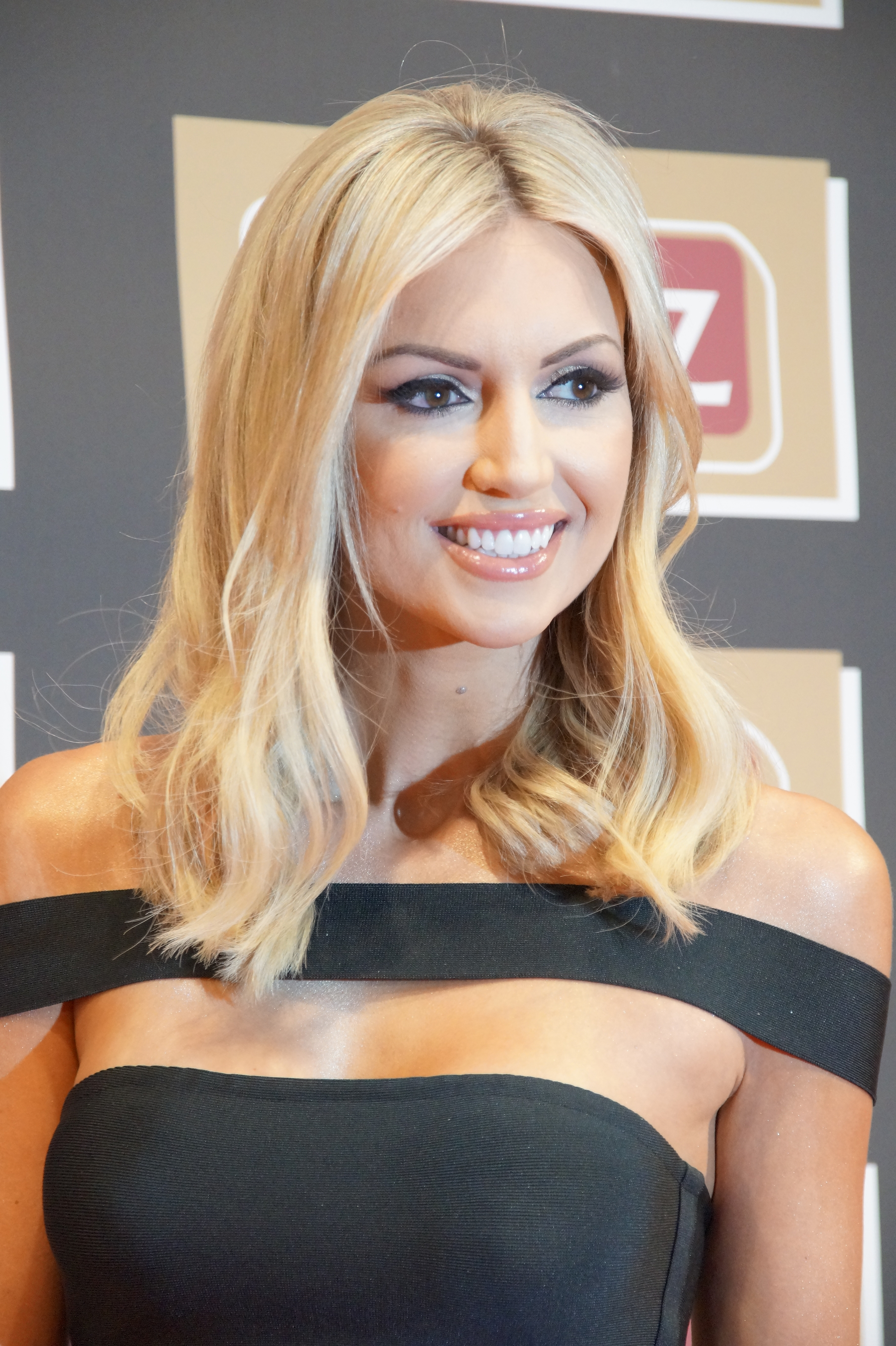
- Rosanna Davison, winner of Miss World 2003
- Date: 6 December 2003
- Presenters: Phil Keoghan; Amanda Byram; Angela Chow
- Entertainment: Luis Fonsi; Bryan Ferry
- Venue: Crown of Beauty Theatre, Sanya, China
- Broadcaster: E!; CCTV
- Entrants: 106
- Placements: 20
- Debuts: Andorra; Ethiopia; Georgia; Guadeloupe; Northern Mariana Islands
- Withdrawals: Algeria; French Polynesia; Ghana; United States Virgin Islands
- Returns: Belarus; Cayman Islands; Costa Rica; Denmark; Dominican Republic; Guatemala; Iceland; Lesotho; Mauritius; Moldova; Nepal; Paraguay; Portugal; South Korea; Sri Lanka; Switzerland; Zambia
- Winner: Rosanna Davison; Ireland

Miss World 2003 was the 53rd edition of the Miss World pageant, held at the Crown of Beauty Theatre in Sanya, China, on December 6, 2003. It was the first time that the Miss World pageant held in China.

At the end of the event, Azra Akın of Turkey crowned Rosanna Davison of Ireland as her successor. It is Ireland's first victory in the history of the pageant. The first and second runners-up we're Canada's Nazanin Afshin-Jam and China's Guan Qi.

106 contestants competed in this year's pageant, surpassing the previous record of 95 contestants in 2000. The pageant was hosted by Phil Keoghan, Amanda Byram, and Angela Chow. Luis Fonsi and Bryan Ferry performed in this year's pageant.

== Debuts, returns, and, withdrawals ==
This edition saw the debut of Andorra, Ethiopia, Georgia, Guadeloupe and Northern Mariana Islands, and the return of Belarus, Cayman Islands, Costa Rica, Denmark, Dominican Republic, Guatemala, Iceland, Lesotho, Mauritius, Moldova, Nepal, Paraguay, Portugal, South Korea, Sri Lanka, Switzerland and Zambia; Lesotho, which last competed in 1981, Mauritius in 1998, Zambia in 1999, Belarus, Denmark, Guatemala, Moldova, Nepal, Paraguay and Sri Lanka in 2000 and Cayman Islands, Costa Rica, Dominican Republic, Iceland, Portugal, South Korea and Switzerland in 2001 .

Algeria, French Polynesia, Ghana, and the United States Virgin Islands, withdrew from the competition.

== Results ==
=== Placements ===
Placement	Contestant
Miss World 2003	Ireland – Rosanna Davison
1st Runner-Up	Canada – Nazanin Afshin-Jam
2nd Runner-Up	China – Guan Qi
Top 5	India – Ami Vashi; Philippines – Maria Rafaela Yunon
Top 20	Australia – Olivia Stratton; Bolivia – Helen Aponte; Dominican Republic – María Vargas; Ethiopia – Hayat Ahmed; Georgia – Irina Onashvili; Greece – Vasiliki Tsekoura; Jamaica – Jade Fulford; Lebanon – Marie-José Hnein; New Zealand – Melanie Paul; Norway – Elisabeth Wathne; Peru – Claudia Hernández; Puerto Rico – Joyceline Montero; Switzerland – Bianca Sissing; Trinidad and Tobago – Magdalene Walcott; Venezuela – Valentina Patruno

==== Continental Queens of Beauty ====
Continent	Contestant
Africa	Ethiopia – Hayat Ahmed
Americas	Canada – Nazanin Afshin-Jam
Asia and Oceania	China – Guan Qi
Caribbean	Jamaica – Jade Fulford
Europe	Ireland – Rosanna Davison

== Judges ==
Miss World 2003 had nine judges.

- Candace Bushnell
- Jackie Chan
- Agbani Darego – Miss World 2001 from Nigeria
- Bruce Forsyth†
- Gustavo Gianetti
- Julia Morley – Chairwoman of the Miss World Organisation
- Krish Naidoo
- Clive Robertson
- Dick Zimmermann

== Contestants ==
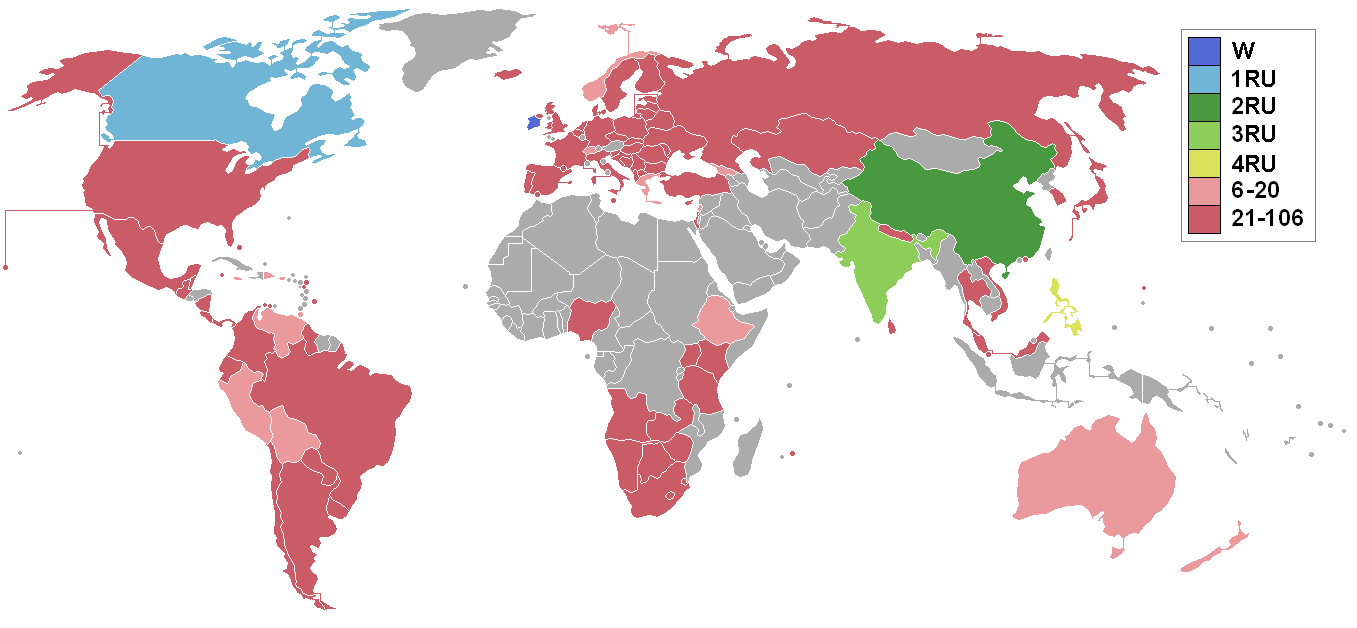
Countries and territories which sent delegates and results for Miss World 2003

106 contestants competed for the title.

Country/Territory	Contestant	Age (Note: Ages at the time of the pageant)	Hometown
Albania	Denisa Kola	21	Peshkopi
Andorra	María José Girol Jumenez	19	Andorra la Vella
Angola	Celma Katia Carlos	20	Lubango
Antigua and Barbuda	Anne-Marie Browne	24	St. John's
Argentina	Grisel Hitoff	24	Buenos Aires
Aruba	Nathalie Biermanns	21	Oranjestad
Australia	Olivia Stratton	22	Adelaide
Bahamas	Shantell Hall	19	Freeport
Barbados	Raquel Wilkinson	23	Bridgetown
Belarus	Volha Nevdakh	23	Minsk
Belgium	Julie Taton	19	Jambes
Belize	Dalila Vanzie	25	Dangriga
Bolivia	Helen Aponte	19	Beni
Bosnia and Herzegovina	Irna Smaka	19	Sarajevo
Botswana	Boingotlo Motlalekgosi	19	Gaborone
Brazil	Lara Brito	24	Goiânia
Bulgaria	Rajna Naldzhieva	17	Sofia
Canada	Nazanin Afshin-Jam	24	Vancouver
Cayman Islands	Nichelle Welcome	24	George Town
Chile	Alejandra Soler	25	La Serena
China	Guan Qi	21	Changchun
Colombia	Claudia Molina	18	Barranquilla
Costa Rica	Shirley Álvarez	23	Desamparados
Croatia	Aleksandra Grdić	24	Virovitica
Curaçao	Angeline da Silva Goes	19	Willemstad
Cyprus	Stella Stylianou	18	Nicosia
Czech Republic	Lucie Váchová	19	Příbram
Denmark	Maj Buchholtz Pedersen	20	Skagen
Dominican Republic	María Eugenia Vargas	19	Santiago
Ecuador	Mayra Rentería	18	Esmeraldas
England	Jacqueline Turner	25	Dorset
Estonia	Kriistina Gabor	19	Pärnu
Ethiopia	Hayat Ahmed	21	Addis Ababa
Finland	Katri Johanna Hynninen	20	Naantali
France	Virginie Dubois	19	Paris
Georgia	Irina Onashvili	18	Tbilisi
Germany	Babette Konau	25	Kiel
Gibraltar	Kim Marie Falzun	20	Gibraltar
Greece	Vasiliki Tsekoura	23	Athens
Guadeloupe	Lauranza Doliman	23	Goyave
Guatemala	Dulce María Duarte	21	Chiquimula
Guyana	Alexis Glasgow	22	New Amsterdam
Holland	Sanne de Regt	21	Goes
Hong Kong	Rabee'a Yeung	22	Hong Kong
Hungary	Eszter Tóth	19	Tatabánya
Iceland	Regína Jónsdóttir	20	Reykjavík
India	Ami Vashi	23	Mumbai
Ireland	Rosanna Davison	19	Enniskerry
Israel	Miri Levy	20	Haifa
Italy	Silvia Cannas	21	Cagliari
Jamaica	Jade Fulford	21	Kingston
Japan	Kaoru Nishide	25	Kyoto
Kazakhstan	Saule Zhunosova	17	Pavlodar
Kenya	Janet Kibugu	18	Nairobi
Latvia	Irina Askolska	23	Riga
Lebanon	Marie-José Hnein	19	Baabda
Lesotho	Makuena Lepolesa	20	Maseru
Lithuania	Vaida Grikšaitė	20	Klaipėda
Macedonia	Marija Vašik	19	Skopje
Malaysia	Wong Sze Zen	23	Kuala Lumpur
Malta	Rachel Xuereb	22	Gwardamanġa
Mauritius	Marie Aimee Bergicourt	24	Pamplemousses
Mexico	Erika Honstein	22	Hermosillo
Moldova	Elena Danilciuc	18	Chișinău
Namibia	Petrina Thomas	22	Keetmanshoop
Nepal	Priti Sitoula	21	Kathmandu
New Zealand	Melanie Paul	23	Auckland
Nicaragua	Hailey Britton Brooks	22	Bluefields
Nigeria	Ohumotu Bissong	20	Calabar
Northern Ireland	Diana Sayers	22	Saintfield
Northern Mariana Islands	Kimberly Castro Reyes	19	Saipan
Norway	Elisabeth Wathne	21	Mandal
Panama	Ivy Ruth Ortega	19	Panama City
Paraguay	Karina Buttner	21	Asunción
Peru	Claudia Hernández	22	Lima
Philippines	Maria Rafaela Yunon	22	Tarlac
Poland	Karolina Gorazda	23	Kraków
Portugal	Vanessa Job	20	Oeiras
Puerto Rico	Joyceline Montero	21	Bayamón
Romania	Patricia Filomena Chifor	17	Satu Mare
Russia	Svetlana Goreva	21	Tula
Scotland	Nicci Jolly	22	Inverbervie
Serbia and Montenegro (Note: Yugoslavia changed its name to Serbia and Montenegro.)	Bojana Vujadinović	23	Belgrade
Singapore	Corine Kanmani	24	Singapore
Slovakia	Adriana Pospíšilová	20	Bratislava
Slovenia	Tina Zajc	20	Ljubljana
South Africa	Cindy Nell	22	Pretoria
South Korea (Note: competed as Korea in the pageant)	Park Ji-yea	24	North Jeolla
Spain	María Teresa Martín	23	Antequera
Sri Lanka	Sachini Stanley	21	Kandy
Swaziland	Thembelihle Zwane	18	Mbabane
Sweden	Ida Söfringsgärd	19	Växjö
Switzerland	Bianca Sissing	24	Lucerne
Tanzania	Sylvia Bahame	20	Dar es Salaam
Thailand	Janejira Keardprasop	22	Bangkok
Trinidad and Tobago	Magdalene Walcott	21	Tunapuna–Piarco
Turkey	Tuğba Karaca	24	Ankara
Uganda	Aysha Nassanga	20	Kampala
Ukraine	Ilona Yakovleva	22	Kharkiv
United States	Kimberly Ann Harlan	20	Atlanta
Uruguay	Natalia Rodríguez	24	Montevideo
Venezuela	Valentina Patruno	21	Caracas
Vietnam	Nguyễn Đình Thụy Quân	17	Ho Chi Minh City
Wales	Imogen Thomas	21	Llanelli
Zambia	Cynthia Kanema	22	Kabwe
Zimbabwe	Phoebe Monjane	21	Marondera

== Notes ==
=== Did not compete ===
- Armenia – Lusine Tovmasyan - She withdrew due to financial problems.
- Fiji – Aishwarya Sukhdeo - She withdrew at the last minute for unknown reasons. however, she competed in Miss World a year later.

=== No Shows ===
- Algeria – Mounia Achlaf
- Austria – Miss Austria 2003, Tanja Duhovich did not compete due to not meeting the age requirements, she was just 17. Then the Miss Austria corporation decided to appoint the Miss Austria 2003 second runner up, Bianca Zudrell at the last minute with no time to prepare her visa.
- British Virgin Islands – No contest
- Haiti - No Contest
- Malawi – Mable Pulu
- Tahiti - Heitiare Tribondeau
- Turks and Caicos Islands- No contest
- Ghana – Did not compete because of a shift in the Miss Ghana calendar. Organizers held the national final, Miss Ghana 2003, on the same day Miss World 2003 was held. This is the reason Ghanaian delegates to Miss World have their titles dating back by a year.
- United States Virgin Islands – Alexandrya Evans. She competed at Miss Universe 2011 8 years later.

=== Replacements ===
- Latvia – Agnese Eiduka
- Sweden – Isabelle Jonsson - She was the first runner up of Fröken Sverige 2003, but the organization just lost the MW licence that year to the newly Miss World Sweden contest.
- Venezuela – Amara Barroeta Seijas.

=== Country Changes ===
- Yugoslavia changed its name to Serbia and Montenegro.

=== Other notes ===
- Northern Mariana Islands was originally crowned for the Miss Universe pageant but was sent to Miss World instead.
