= Nives Orešnik =

Slovene model and beauty pageant

- Born: August 13, 1991; Maribor, Styria, Slovenia
- Education: Academy of Fine Arts and Design
- Occupation: Model
- Height: 1.73 m (5 ft 8 in)
- Beauty pageant titleholder
- Title: Miss Slovenia 2012
- Major competitions: Miss Slovenia 2012 (Winner); Miss World 2012 (Unplaced)

Nives Orešnik (born August 13, 1991) is a Slovene model and beauty pageant titleholder who was crowned Miss Slovenia 2012 and represented her country at Miss World 2012.

== Career ==
At the beginning of her tenure as Miss Slovenia, Orešnik received negative media attention for having appeared in glamour photos in men's magazines. She said that, after she was crowned, she began receiving many requests that she engage in humanitarian work.

In June 2013, Orešnik met with the Miss Slovenia and Miss Earth Slovenia finalists in Lower Carniola. Also that month, Orešnik appeared at a Zumba fundraiser for an organization that opposes cruelty to animals.
