= Nazanin Afshin-Jam =

Iranian-Canadian author

- نازنین افشین جم
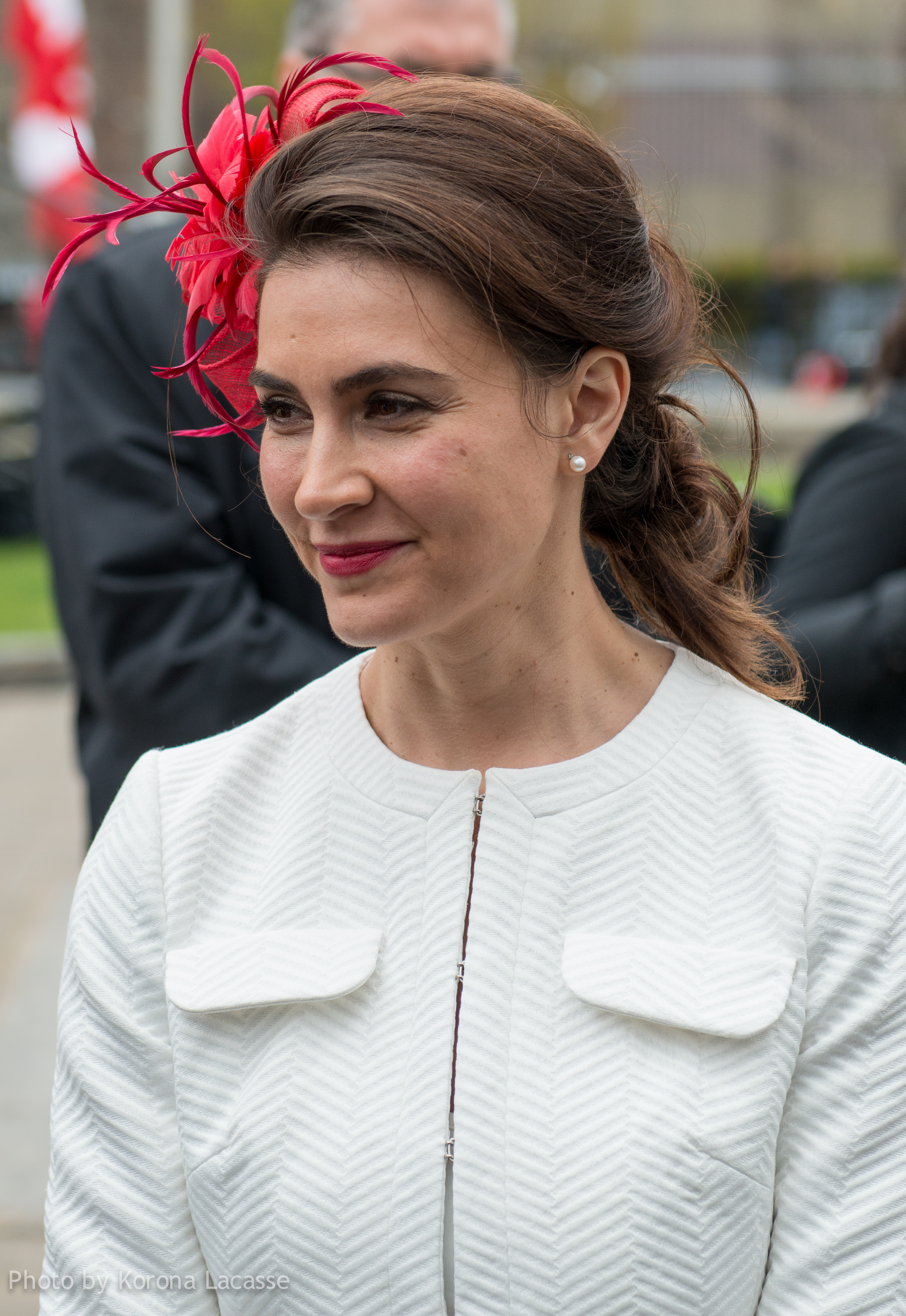
- Afshin-Jam-MacKay at the arrival of Prince Charles in Halifax, Nova Scotia
- Born: April 11, 1979 (age 47); Tehran, Iran
- Education: University of British Columbia (B.A.)
- Title: Miss World Canada 2003
- Spouse: Peter MacKay (m. 2012)
- Children: 3
- Awards: Miss World Canada 2003; (Winner); Miss World 2003; (1st Runner-Up)

Nazanin Afshin-Jam (Persian: نازنین افشین جم, Nāzanin Afŝin Jam, born April 11, 1979) is an Iranian-Canadian human rights activist, author, public speaker and beauty pageant titleholder who was crowned Miss World Canada 2003. She is also president and co-founder of Stop Child Executions, as well as the founder of The Nazanin Foundation. She emigrated to Canada with her family in 1981 and is married to Peter MacKay, former Minister of Justice and Attorney General of Canada.

== Early life ==
Nazanin Afshin-Jam was born on April 11, 1979, in Tehran, Iran. Her father was the head of the Sheraton Hotel in Tehran (now the Tehran Homa Hotel), frequented by westerners. Her mother converted to Christianity prior to the Iranian Revolution, and both Afshin-Jam and her older sister were raised in her mother's faith. During the Iranian Revolution, her father was jailed by the Revolutionary Guard. After he was freed from prison, he fled Iran with his family to Spain and, after a year, they emigrated to Canada, settling in Vancouver.

== Education and Red Cross work ==
Afshin-Jam graduated with international relations and political science degrees from the University of British Columbia. In 2011, she earned her Master of Arts in Diplomacy from Norwich University and she has an honorary doctorate of law from the University of Western Ontario.

Following her graduation, Afshin-Jam served as a Global Youth Educator with the Red Cross, becoming involved in such matters as land mines, children, and war, the poverty-disease cycle, and natural disasters.

== Miss World 2003 ==
Afshin-Jam was crowned Miss World Canada 2003 and represented Canada at Miss World 2003 in Sanya, China on December 6, 2003 where she placed 1st Runner-Up behind eventual winner, Rosanna Davison from Ireland. She scored Canada's highest placement in Miss World's history.

== Activism and awards ==
Afshin-Jam was opposed to the death penalty being applied to an 18-year-old Iranian woman, Nazanin Mahabad Fatehi, who was sentenced to hang for stabbing one of three men who tried to rape her and her niece in Karaj in March 2005. Afshin-Jam started a campaign, including a petition, which attracted more than 350,000 signatures worldwide. She has also dedicated her song, Someday, one of the 12 songs on her similarly titled album, Someday, to Nazanin Fatehi. Eventually, with pressure from the international community, Fatehi was granted a new trial by the head of the judiciary in June, 2006. In January of the following year, Fatehi was exonerated of murder charges and was released after Afshin-Jam raised $43,000 online for bail, while her lawyers worked on her case. For her efforts in helping save Fatehi, Afshin-Jam was awarded the Hero for Human Rights Award from Youth For Human Rights Internationaland Artists for Human Rights.

The Tale of Two Nazanins, by Afshin-Jam and Susan McClelland, chronicling the divergent lives of the two Iranian Nazanins whose lives intersected during Fatehi's trial, was published by HarperCollins in 2012.

Afshin-Jam initiated the Stop Child Executions Campaign and petitioned to help children on death row; the campaign was registered as a non-profit organization with 501-C 3 status in 2008. She is co-founder and President of the organization, whose aim is to put a permanent end to executions of minors in Iran and abroad.

On September 23, 2008, Afshin-Jam organized the Ahmadinejad's Wall of Shame rally at Dag Hammarskjöld park, across from the United Nations headquarters in New York, as Ahmadinejad was addressing the General Assembly. Afshin-Jam received the Global Citizenship Award from the University of British Columbia's Alumni Association in November and, In April of the next year, the Human Rights Hero Award from UN Watch in Geneva, Switzerland. Afshin-Jam was also given the Emerging Leader Peacemaker Award by the YMCA's Power of Peace Awards.

That same year, Afshin-Jam signed an open letter of apology, posted to Iranian.com, along with 266 other Iranian academics, writers, artists, and journalists, about the persecution of Baháʼís. She also chaired the first annual Geneva Summit for Human Rights and Democracy.

Afshin-Jam advocated in 2012 for the closure of the Canadian embassy in Tehran. Afshin-Jam received the Queen Elizabeth II Diamond Jubilee Medal. In 2016, she was conferred an honorary Doctor of Laws, honoris causa, from the University of Western Ontario.

== Film work ==
Afshin-Jam participated, together with eight other women's rights activists, in the documentary film Honor Diaries which explores the issues of gender-based violence and inequality in Muslim-majority societies. Her personal story was featured alongside those of the other activists, all of whom are working to combat gender prejudice that is embedded in honor-based societies.

She also took on the role of 'Shaggy Chick' in Scooby-Doo 2: Monsters Unleashed, where Matthew Lillard's face was attached to her body using CGI during a gag involving magic potions.

== Music ==
Afshin-Jam's debut album, Someday was released in April 2007 by Bodog Music. It spans many different music genres, including world music influenced by Alabina.

Several of Afshin-Jam's songs have made the Top 30 and Top 40 charts. Her debut single, "I Dance 4 U" was charted at #20 in the Music Week - Commercial Pop Top 30 Club Chart (a music video for the song has been released). Afshim-Jam's single "Someday" has been climbing the FMQB Top 40 chart in the U.S. and is currently at #7. Her new single "I Do" reached #39 on the Billboard Chart in adult contemporary music. A Christmas single "On Christmas Day" has also made the charts, ranking #59 on the ACQB chart. The proceeds from the song are contributed to the Stop Child Executions Campaign.

== Personal life ==
A licensed pilot, Afshin-Jam flies both powered aircraft and gliders and achieved the highest rank in the Royal Canadian Air Cadets—Warrant Officer First Class. She was raised a Catholic and remains a practising one.

In 2011, she earned her Master of Arts in Diplomacy from Norwich University. On January 4, 2012, Afshin-Jam married Peter MacKay, then the Minister of Justice and Attorney General of Canada, at a private ceremony in Mexico. The couple have two sons, one named Kian, born in 2013 and another named Caledon, born in 2018 and one daughter named Valentia, born in 2015.

== See also ==
- List of Iranian women activists

== Bibliography ==
- Afshin-Jam, Nazanin; McClelland, Susan (2012). The Tale of Two Nazanins. Scarborough Ontario: HarperCollins Canada. ISBN 9781554689729.

Awards and achievements
Preceded by Lynsey Bennett	Miss World Canada; 2003	Succeeded by Tijana Arnautović
Preceded by (Colombia) Natalia Peralta	Miss World Americas; 2003	Succeeded by (United States) Nancy Randall
Preceded by (Colombia) Natalia Peralta	1st Runner-up Miss World; 2003	Succeeded by (Dominican Republic) Claudia Cruz
