= Crime against chastity =

Sex crimes

Crimes against chastity are sex crimes.

They include but are not limited to the following sexual acts, defined as such in the jurisdiction where they are prosecuted:

- Adultery
- Child sexual abuse
- Prostitution
- Sodomy
- Rape
- Abduction

On April 6, 1967, birth control advocate Bill Baird was arrested in Boston, Massachusetts on charges of "crimes against chastity" for holding a lecture on birth control at Boston University and giving an unmarried female a condom and a contraceptive sponge. Baird served three months in prison but, in 1972, won a Supreme Court case, Eisenstadt v. Baird.

Massachusetts continues to have laws on "Crimes Against Chastity, Morality, Decency and Good Order", which includes laws against providing contraception or information on contraception to unmarried persons (Chapter 272, section 21A), but the latter are now considered dead letter.
