= Atefeh Sahaaleh =

Executed 16 year old Iranian citizen (1987-2004)

Atefeh Rajabi Sahaaleh عاطفه رجبی سهاله
- Born: September 21, 1987; Neka, Iran
- Died: August 15, 2004 (aged 16); Neka, Iran
- Status: Pardoned after execution
- Convictions: Adultery and crimes against chastity
- Penalty: Death by hanging

Atefeh Rajabi Sahaaleh (Persian: عاطفه رجبی سهاله; September 21, 1987 – August 15, 2004) was an Iranian girl from the town of Neka, Mazandaran Province, who was executed a week after being sentenced to death by Haji Rezai, head of Neka's court, on charges of adultery and crimes against chastity after being repeatedly raped.

== Early life ==
Sahaaleh was born in Neka, and her family moved to Mashhad shortly after her birth. When she was a young girl, her parents separated and her mother remarried. Her mother died in a car crash when Sahaaleh was five years old. Around that same time, her younger brother was said to have drowned in a river. Her father became a drug addict, and she was forced to care for her octogenerian grandparents. Despite her attention to their needs, they were reported to have largely ignored her. She was described as a "lively and intelligent girl".

== Arrests ==
Sahaaleh was convicted of fornication under Iranian Penal Code Article 221 (a crime against chastity) when she was 13 years old. Following a police raid, she was discovered alone in a car with a 51 year old man. She was jailed and given 100 lashes. While in prison, she was further tortured and raped by prison guards. She told her grandmother that she could only walk on all fours because of the pain. In the following years, she was arrested twice more for crimes against chastity, and both convictions were punished by flogging and jail time. Under Iranian Penal Code Article 136, a fourth conviction for a hadd crime for which the punishment was carried out three previous times results in the death penalty.

That fourth conviction started in May 2003, when Sahaaleh was arrested at home and charged with adultery and immorality. Authorities presented a report which they claimed supported the charges against Sahaaleh, but the only signatures on the report were police officers and other local authorities.

The judge presiding over the trial was Haji Rezai. After Rezai interrogated Sahaaleh, she confessed to being raped by Ali Darabi, a married 51-year-old ex-revolutionary guard turned taxi driver. Sahaaleh was raped repeatedly by Darabi over the previous three years. When Sahaaleh realized that she was losing her case, she removed her hijab, an act seen as a severe contempt of the court, and argued that Darabi should be punished, not her. She removed her shoes and threw them at the judge. Rezai sentenced Sahaaleh to death. Her lawyer appealed to Iran's Supreme Court in Tehran, where the verdict was upheld due to Sahaaleh's confession and three prior convictions for similar offenses.

According to the BBC, the documents presented to the Supreme Court of Appeal described her as 22 years old, but her birth certificate and death certificate stated that she was 16. A witness stated that "the judge just looked at [Sahaaleh's] body, because of the developed physique ... and declared her as 22", and her father alleges that "neither the judge nor even Sahaaleh's court appointed lawyer did anything to find out her true age".

== Execution ==
She was publicly hanged from a crane in Neka on August 15, 2004.

Sahaaleh's execution is considered controversial, in part because, as a signatory of the International Covenant on Civil and Political Rights, Iran promised not to execute anyone under the age of 18. According to a 2004 press release issued by Amnesty International, Sahaaleh was the tenth minor Iran had executed since 1990. They declared her execution to be a crime against humanity and against children of the world.

After the execution of Sahaaleh, Iranian media reported that Judge Rezai and several militia members, including Captain Zabihi and Captain Molai, were arrested by the Intelligence Ministry. Pursuant to continual complaints filed by Sahaaleh's family, and heavy international pressure about her execution and the way the judge mishandled the case, the Supreme Court of Iran issued an order to posthumously pardon Sahaaleh.

== Documentaries ==
Sahaaleh's story was the subject of a BBC documentary produced by Wild Pictures in 2006. Monica Garnsey and Arash Sahami went undercover to document the case. It was also the subject of an hour-long Discovery Times program called Execution in Iran.

== See also ==
- Human rights in Iran
- Women's rights in Iran
- Stop Child Executions Campaign
- List of miscarriage of justice cases
- Stoning of Aisha Ibrahim Duhulow
