= Nazanin Fatehi =

Iranian woman

- Born: 1987 (age 38–39)
- Other name: Mahabad
- Parent: Mother Maryam [father's name unknown]
- Status: Overturned, released
- Motive: Self-defense, victim of physical and sexual assault
- Criminal charge: Murder
- Penalty: Death (qesas), by hanging

Nazanin (Mahabad) Fatehi (Persian: نازنین فاتحی; born 1987) is an Iranian woman who was sentenced to death for stabbing a man who allegedly tried to rape her and her 15-year-old niece, when she herself was a 17-year-old. After more than two years in jail, Fatehi was cleared of the intentional murder charge, ordered to pay diyeh (blood money for the death), and released on bail (January 2007). As of 2012, Fatehi's whereabouts were reported to be unknown to concerned supporters outside of Iran.

== Background ==
Fatehi and the niece involved in the event leading to Fatehi's arrest, also a minor, are described as being "from an economically deprived Kurdish family" living in "abysmal poverty". Reports of family life include "a mother who [felt] that she was cursed to give birth to a girl" and the expectation that Nazanin would remain uneducated and care for siblings, and a father addicted to opium, with references to physical and psychological abuse from parents and a male sibling, and childhood sexual abuse by a family acquaintance. Their home, in the relevant time period, was in Karaj, west of Tehran.

== Description of the crime, trial, and initial conviction ==
Nazanin Fatehi, as reported in the Iranian daily Etemaad, was 17 years old at the time of these events; she and her 15-year-old niece were traveling in a secluded park area near Karaj, their home, west of Tehran; there, per the Amnesty International description of the case, a "group of youths surrounded the girls and tried to rape them". The men were alleged to have pushed Fatehi and her niece to the ground and tried to sexually assault them; the defendant then reportedly took a knife from her pocket, trying to protect herself, and stabbed one of the men in the hand.

According to Fatehi, as reported in the Etemaad article, the girls then tried to escape but the men overtook them; at this point Fatehi stabbed one of the male attackers in the chest (a wound that eventually led to his death), fled the scene for a police location, and reported the incident. According to the account of the court proceedings in the Etemaad source, when being interrogated by the judge, Fatehi began to sob uncontrollably and yelled: "I did not want to kill him! I am not at all a bad-doer. Mr. Judge, what do you want to do with me? I am a girl child! How many times do I have to say that I did this to defend myself and my niece?" According to the Amnesty account, the defendant told the court: "I wanted to defend myself and my niece ... However, I did not want to kill that boy. At the heat of the moment I did not know what to do because no one came to our help".

According to the original Etemaad story, one of the boyfriends recalls the events in this way: "In an instant, three young men approached us in a threatening manner and said some horrible things to us. Then, Mohammad, one of those men, attacked us with a rock. Samieh got off of my motorcycle and approached the men to fight them. Roozbeh and I were both scared, so we got on our motorcycles to flee, and just as we got on our bikes, I saw one of the men on the ground bleeding."

The Etemaad news story also reports that at the time of the attack, Fatehi was a runaway who was disowned by her family; however, a phone interview with Fatehi's mother is reported to have shown that her mother displayed great concern about her daughter's fate, and that she tearfully pleaded for her daughter's life. In the same interview, Nazanin's mother reportedly confirmed that she had asked the mother of the deceased man for pardon, but that she had been refused.

Nazanin Fatehi was sentenced to qesas, to death in retaliation for murder, in January 2006, by a criminal court of the Islamic Republic of Iran. The verdict was death by hanging.

== Public reactions to the initial conviction ==
Fatehi had claimed to act in self-defense; critics have pointed out that in another country she might have been acquitted, or received only a short prison sentence. Iran also makes minors of young age eligible for the death penalty—at 15 years for males, and nine years for females. In response to their review of the facts of the case, Amnesty International began to lobby on behalf of Fatehi. "I think cases like this are illustrative of the fact there is a serious human rights crisis in Iran; the death penalty, discrimination against women and a whole host of other concerns. It really is time for the international community to put those issues right at the top of the agenda", said Alex Neve, Secretary General of Amnesty International Canada. In this and others public statements, Amnesty International addressed its concerns about the Fatehi case.

Musician, activist, and former Iranian Miss World Canada Nazanin Afshin-Jam initiated an appeal, the "Save Nazanin Campaign", starting a petition that attracted more than 350,000 signatures worldwide (January 2007), in an effort to save Fatehi's life. Negar Azmudeh, a Vancouver-based immigration lawyer, helped the Campaign, arguing that the case demonstrated the unjust treatment of women in Iran. Azmudeh told Canadian Television (CTV) that had Fatehi been killed by a man, he would likely not have received a death sentence "[b]ecause the value of his life would be twice as much as Nazanin's."

The aforementioned petition regarding the Fatehi case was directed at Mr. Kofi Annan, the former Secretary General of the United Nations. Following a meeting at the UN between Nazanin Afshin-Jam and UN high commissioner Louise Arbour, the UN contacted the Iranian government regarding the Fatehi case. In relation to the international appeal effort, Fatehi gave an interview in 2006, via questionnaire, to Ms. Afshin-Jam. Ms. Afshin-Jam also addressed Canadian parliament members regarding the matter on 5 June 2006, and MP Belinda Stronach rose in the House of Commons of Canada during Question Period to ask the Canadian Minister of Foreign Affairs Peter MacKay to confirm that he had received assurances from the Iranian embassy that a new trial was ordered for Fatehi.

== Legal appeal and overturn of sentence ==
Fatehi's case was scheduled to be reviewed by the Iranian Supreme Court the week following the original conviction. Her time in prison, initially for six months before the overturn of her sentence, but stretching eventually to two years, includes reports of being drugged and beaten. As reported by the Iranian newspaper Hamshahri, the Supreme Court of the Islamic Republic of Iran ordered the death sentence of Nazanin Fatehi overturned on 1 June 2006 "reportedly on the instruction of the Head of the Judiciary", Ayatollah Shahroudi, subject to payment of diyeh (blood money) to the family of the alleged rapist that had died. Fatehi was nevertheless placed in solitary confinement, and a retrial set for August 2006.

== Retrial ==
The retrial of Nazanin Fatehi began on 30 August 2006, lasting from 10:30 AM to 12:30 PM. Fatehi, her 3 lawyers, and members of her family were present, while members of the family of the deceased were absent. Fatehi told the Judge that she has been honest from the very beginning; extending an arm out to the Judge, she expressed that she had come forward, giving the knife to the police at the scene, and telling them that she had stabbed the man in self-defense, to protect her honor. Further addressing the Judge, she asked what he would have done, facing 3 attackers, but received no response. Fatehi's mother Maryam addressed the court, expressing discontent that officials had made Fatehi sign her own death sentence earlier, since Nazanin had no education and was unable to read or understand the papers being signed. She was ultimately asked to leave the courtroom, for the emotion she was displaying. Fatehi's father stood up and addressed the court, denying newspaper reports that Nazanin was a run-away and that he had told the Judges to go ahead with the execution. A Judge replied that the claims appeared in their reports; the subsequent request by Nazanin's father for verification of the information led the court to acknowledge that the records did not support the injurious statements. According to an Etemaad report on the retrial, Fatehi's niece also testified in her favor.

Canadian activist Nazanin Afshin-Jam made a video appeal to Iranian officials 5 days prior to the re-trial, and, with the Calvin Ayre Foundation, released a documentary titled "The Tale of Two Nazanins"; the short documentary directed by Hossein Martin Fazeli featured Nazanin's family in Iran, and an emotional phone conversation with Nazanin Fatehi from her prison.

No judgement was made at the first convening of the retrial, and the court announced a continuance scheduled for 10 January 2007. After brief delays, the trial began with many observers in the courtroom, and two of Fatehi's defense attorneys proceeding with their defense. The re-trial ended on 14 January with a unanimous decision by the five judges, clearing Fatehi of intentional murder, but ordering her to pay diyeh (blood money/restitution) for the death, i.e., in order to receive a pardon from the family of the deceased.

== Release, and appeal of diyeh ==
Fatehi's lawyers, Shadi Sadr and Mohamad Mostafaei, appealed the court decision regarding the payment of diyeh (see above), and made arrangements for Fatehi to be released from prison on bail. The amount of bail was on the order of ≈US$40–50,000 (400–465 million rials), in addition to the diyeh of >US$32,000 (300 million rials), and a trust fund was established by Nazanin Afshin-Jam to collect the necessary funds to post bail in order to free Fatehi. On 31 January 2007, Nazanin Mahabad Fatehi was released on bail. In April 2007, Nazanin's attorney filed objection to the part of the verdict that required Nazanin Fatehi to pay the retribution.

== Current status ==
As of July 2012, the whereabouts of Fatehi were reported as unknown by individuals in the West with whom she had prior contact, with current contact being only the most sporadic. A book from Canadian supporter and activist Nazanin Afshin-Jam appeared in 2012 chronicling the divergent lives of these two Iranian Nazanins, whose lives intersected during the period of Fatehi's trial; media responses to the book were generally positive.

== See also ==
- Human rights in Iran
- Juvenile capital punishment
